= Lee Hyun-seung (director) =

South Korean film director, screenwriter and producer

- Born: August 18, 1961 (age 65); South Korea
- Education: Hongik University; Korean Academy of Film Arts
- Occupations: Film director; screenwriter; film producer
- Years active: 1986–present

Korean name
- Hangul: 이현승
- Hanja: 李鉉升
- RR: I Hyeonseung
- MR: I Hyŏnsŭng

Lee Hyun-seung (born August 18, 1961) is a South Korean film director, screenwriter and producer. He directed The Blue in You (1992), Sunset Into the Neon Lights (1995), Il Mare (2000) and Hindsight (2011).

== Career ==
Lee Hyun-seung studied Visual Communication Design in the Department of Fine Arts at Hongik University, then filmmaking at Korean Academy of Film Arts. In 1986, he began working as an assistant director for Park Chul-soo and Park Kwang-su. Lee made his feature directorial debut with The Blue in You (1992), which drew praise for its lush, sensual images and strong use of color. Starring Kang Soo-yeon and Ahn Sung-ki as a businesswoman and photographer who fall in love despite their equally uncompromising personalities, it is considered among the first Korean feminist films of its era.

His second film Sunset Into the Neon Lights (1995), starring Moon Sung-keun and Chae Shi-ra, was less well received. Lee said the film was slightly autobiographical about his college experience in the turbulent 1980s, and it tackled issues of capitalism versus art in the advertising world, and sexism that a recently graduated female copywriter encounters in her workplace.

But it was Il Mare (2000) that made Lee into a household name. A melancholic love story between an architect and a voice actress (played by Lee Jung-jae and Jun Ji-hyun) who are mystically connected by a mailbox across two different time periods, Il Mare displayed Lee's knack for crafting subtle nuances by juxtaposing the characters' emotions with beautiful cinematography, framing and mood. Though not a commercial hit during its theatrical run, Il Mare later attained the status of a minor classic among Korean cinema fans, and became the first domestic film to be remade in Hollywood (2006's The Lake House starring Keanu Reeves and Sandra Bullock).

Lee then took a hiatus from directing features for the next decade. He said he had reached a crossroads professionally, and wanted to concentrate on improving the standards of the Korean film industry. He did this by working as a producer for short films and features by aspiring directors such as The Unforgiven (2005) and Enlightenment Film (2010), as well as for the human rights-themed projects If You Were Me (2003), If You Were Me 4 (2009), and Fly Penguin (2009). Lee also served in several cinema-related capacities, such as being the first commissioner of the Gyeonggi Performing Arts & Film Commission, vice-chairman of the Korean Film Council, executive director of the Mise-en-scène Short Film Festival, film professor at Chung-Ang University, and founder of the Director's Cut Awards, among others. During this period, his only directorial efforts were the short films Between (2002), Twenty Millimeter Thick (2004, starring Yum Jung-ah), and Relay (2009, starring Park Bo-young and Son Eun-seo).

In 2011, eleven years after Il Mare, he made his long-awaited directorial comeback with Hindsight, which starred Song Kang-ho and Shin Se-kyung as a retired crime boss attending culinary school and the young female assassin out to kill him. Lee said, "I have done four films that feature male-female duos. But none of them have been about conventional romantic relationships. Men and women form all sorts of connections. It might seem vague but this allows room for imagination and provokes curiosity." Despite being his most commercial film to date, Hindsight still displayed Lee's trademark arthouse aesthetic; the film received a lackluster critical reception and box office.

== Filmography ==
=== Director ===
- Gwan-gye (short film, 1987)
- Woman F (short film, 1987)
- The Blue in You (1992)
- Sunset Into the Neon Lights (1995)
- Il Mare (2000)
- Director Driver (short film, 2001)
- Between (short film, 2002)
- Twenty Millimeter Thick (short film in Twentidentity, 2004)
- Relay (short film in If You Were Me 4, 2009)
- Hindsight (2011)

=== Screenwriter ===
- Gwan-gye (short film, 1987)
- The Blue in You (1992)
- Sunset Into the Neon Lights (1995)
- Twenty Millimeter Thick (short film in Twentidentity, 2004)
- Relay (short film in If You Were Me 4, 2009)
- Hindsight (2011)

=== Producer ===
- Dad Still Has Fucking Coughed (short film, 2003) - executive producer
- The Little Girl (short film, 2003)
- If You Were Me (2003)
- What Are You Doing, Chulsoo? (short film, 2004)
- Paper Airplane (short film, 2004)
- In the Bed (short film, 2004)
- Smoke-flavored Life (short film, 2004)
- War Movie (short film, 2005)
- Noryangjin Totoro (short film, 2005)
- The Unforgiven (2005)
- Sunshine in My Pocket (short film, 2006)
- A Butterfly (short film, 2006)
- I'm Not That Kind of Person (short film, 2006)
- Grandma and Wrestling (short film, 2007)
- If You Were Me 4 (2009) - executive producer
- Fly Penguin (2009)
- Enlightenment Film (2010)
- Hindsight (2011) - executive producer
- An American Friend (2014)

=== Various ===
- Moon (short film, 1987) - crew
- Chilsu and Mansu (1988) - assistant director
- Black Republic (1990) - assistant director
- Berlin Report (1991) - assistant director
- Dead End (short film, 1993) - production designer
- Man (1995) - production designer
- The Real Man (1996) - art department crew
- Dragon Tucca (1996) - planner
- 3PM Paradise Bath House (1997) - assistant director
- Shoot the Sun By Lyric (1999) - crew
- City of the Rising Sun (1999) - actor
- Raindrop Prelude (short film, 2003) - crew
- Out of My Intention (short film, 2008) - crew
- My Burning Heart (2010) - planner
- Ari Ari the Korean Cinema (documentary, 2012) - as himself
- Top Star (2013) - cameo

== Awards ==
- 1993 4th Chunsa Film Art Awards: Best New Director (The Blue in You)
- 1993 14th Blue Dragon Film Awards: Best New Director (The Blue in You)
