= When a Man Falls in Love =

2013 South Korean TV series

- Promotional poster
- Also known as: When a Man Is in Love; When a Man Loves a Woman; A Man in Love
- Hangul: 남자가 사랑할 때
- RR: Namjaga saranghal ttae
- MR: Namjaga saranghal ttae
- Genre: Romance; Melodrama
- Written by: Kim In-young
- Directed by: Kim Sang-ho; Choi Byung-gil
- Starring: Song Seung-heon; Shin Se-kyung; Chae Jung-an; Yeon Woo-jin
- Music by: Oh Joon-sung
- Country of origin: South Korea
- Original language: Korean
- No. of episodes: 20

Production
- Executive producer: Park Hong-gyun
- Producer: Choi Jun-seok
- Production locations: South Korea; Guam
- Cinematography: Kim Jong-jin; Jung Chan-hong
- Editor: Kim Hee-sung
- Running time: 60 minutes
- Production company: iWill Media

Original release
- Network: MBC TV
- Release: April 3 – June 6, 2013

When a Man Falls in Love (Korean: 남자가 사랑할 때; RR: Namjaga saranghal ttae; lit. When a Man Loves) is a 2013 South Korean television drama series broadcast by MBC. Directed by Kim Sang-ho and Choi Byung-gil, it stars Song Seung-heon, Shin Se-kyung, Chae Jung-an and Yeon Woo-jin. It aired from April 3 to June 6, 2013, replacing 7th Grade Civil Servant and was replaced by The Queen's Classroom. The story revolves around a world-weary gangster as his love life intertwines with three others, and how the course of their lives changes entirely based on one moment of fevered passion.

== Plot ==
Han Tae-sang (Song Seung-heon) is a successful but cold-blooded businessman who is unstoppable once he sets his mind on doing or getting something. He had once been a smart young man full of potential, but his dreams came to a halt when he was forced to work as a gangster for the same loan shark that destroyed his family. Since then, he has been able to build a successful business through his own blood, sweat and tears, and everything he's gotten in his life has been hard-earned. Then one day, what was supposed to have been a simple extortion job turns into a chance meeting with Seo Mi-do (Shin Se-kyung), the daughter of a modest bookstore owner. Mi-do is a troubled young woman who is full of drive and ambition; she is determined to better her life to forget the hardships of her poverty-stricken childhood. In Mi-do, Tae-sang sees so much of his own personality that he is drawn to her fire and passion. As he begins to fall in love with her, he realizes that he will do anything to protect her and try to give her a better life, perhaps to redeem himself. As the plot proceeds Mi-do meets Lee Jae-hee (Yeon Woo-jin) who falls in love with her. The story later on how Han Tae-sang, Seo Mi-do & Lee Jae-hee deal with their mutual love and relation.

== Cast ==
=== Main characters ===
- Song Seung-heon - Han Tae-sang

Tae-sang is a thug, a cold-hearted loan shark who survives his boss's betrayal and steps up from right-hand man to head of the gang. Then he falls in love for the first time, and leaves it all behind in the name of love, morphing into a successful businessman.

- Shin Se-kyung - Seo Mi-do

A hardworking young woman who comes from a poor family.

- Chae Jung-an - Baek Seung-joo

The ex-girlfriend of Tae-sang's old mob boss, who is in love with Tae-sang.

- Yeon Woo-jin - Lee Jae-hee

A confident young man who's used to winning at everything. Tae-sang supported him through post secondary education but his friendship with Tae-sang turns to rivalry when both are in love with Mi-do.

=== Supporting characters ===
- Jay B - Seo Mi-joon

Mi-do's younger brother, a trainee with a major talent agency.

- Park Jin-young - Ddol-yi

A part-time employee who works for Tae-sang's mother.

- Kang Shin-il - Seo Kyung-wook
- Oh Young-shil - Choi Seon-ae
- Lee Chang-hoon - Gu Yong-gab
- Kim Sung-oh - Lee Chang-hee
- Jo Jae-ryong - Yoon Dong-gu
- Jung Young-sook - Yoon Hong-ja
- Park Min-ji - Eun-ae
- Yeon Min-ji - Jin Song-yeon
- Lee Sung-min - Kim Dae-kwang, Tae-sang's boss (guest appearance, ep 1–2,4)

== Ratings ==
In the table below, the blue numbers represent the lowest ratings and the red numbers represent the highest ratings.

Episode #	Original broadcast date	Average audience share			
Episode #	Original broadcast date	TNmS Ratings (%)		AGB Nielsen (%)	
Episode #	Original broadcast date	Nationwide	Seoul National Capital Area	Nationwide	Seoul National Capital Area
1	April 3, 2013	7.3%	7.8%	6.6%	6.6%
2	April 4, 2013	10.8%	12.1%	10.1%	11.0%
3	April 10, 2013	9.3%	10.3%	11.4%	13.1%
4	April 11, 2013	11.6%	13.0%	12.1%	13.5%
5	April 17, 2013	11.1%	12.7%	11.4%	12.0%
6	April 18, 2013	10.2%	12.1%	11.3%	12.3%
7	April 24, 2013	9.9%	11.8%	10.5%	11.7%
8	April 25, 2013	9.7%	12.0%	10.2%	11.3%
9	May 1, 2013	9.9%	11.7%	9.5%	10.6%
10	May 2, 2013	9.7%	12.0%	10.8%	12.5%
11	May 8, 2013	9.3%	10.8%	8.9%	10.1%
12	May 9, 2013	9.0%	10.0%	9.0%	9.9%
13	May 15, 2013	9.0%	10.7%	9.1%	10.0%
14	May 16, 2013	9.7%	11.1%	10.3%	12.1%
15	May 22, 2013	10.1%	12.0%	11.4%	12.6%
16	May 23, 2013	9.8%	11.2%	11.2%	12.5%
17	May 29, 2013	10.9%	13.5%	10.6%	11.8%
18	May 30, 2013	10.5%	12.0%	9.9%	10.2%
19	June 5, 2013	9.8%	11.7%	11.1%	11.7%
20	June 6, 2013	9.7%	11.9%	12.1%	13.3%
Average		9.9%	11.5%	10.4%	11.4%
