= Rookie Historian Goo Hae-ryung =

2019 South Korean television series

- Promotional poster
- Hangul: 신입사관 구해령
- RR: Sinipsagwan Gu Haeryeong
- MR: Sinipsagwan Ku Haeryŏng
- Genre: Historical; Romance; Drama; Comedy
- Created by: Sohn Hyung-suk
- Written by: Kim Ho-soo
- Directed by: Kang Il-soo; Han Hyun-hee
- Starring: Shin Se-kyung; Cha Eun-woo
- Country of origin: South Korea
- Original language: Korean
- No. of episodes: 20 (Note: In order to circumvent Korean laws that prevent commercial breaks in the middle of an episode, what would previously have been aired as single 70 minute episodes are now being repackaged as two 35 minute episodes, with two episodes being shown each night with a commercial break between the two.)

Production
- Producers: Kim Sang-heon; Cho Hyung-jin
- Camera setup: Single-camera
- Running time: 35 minutes
- Production company: Chorokbaem Media
- Budget: ₩13.6 billion

Original release
- Network: MBC TV
- Release: July 17 – September 26, 2019

Rookie Historian Goo Hae-ryung (Korean: 신입사관 구해령) is a 2019 South Korean television series starring Shin Se-kyung, in the title role as a free-spirited female historian, and Cha Eun-woo, as a prince working underground as a romance novelist. It is also a fictionalisation of part of the story of the Veritable Records of the Joseon Dynasty and their right to be considered a true history.

The series aired on MBC's Wednesdays and Thursdays at 21:00 KST from July 17 to September 26, 2019, with Netflix carrying the series internationally.

== Synopsis ==
The scenario intertwines two storylines. One of them occurs in a "nowadays" placed in the early 19th century (Note: E01-00:45) of Joseon. The other occurs twenty years earlier (white horse year, 1810 (Note: E17-09:55)). The first one is treated lightly, in the Sungkyunkwan Scandal vein, with caricatures (Note: bridal lessons E01-14:48), jokes, gimmicks, students fights, etc. The second one, only depicted by short flash-backs, is about the unjust situation of the rank and file people, (Note: E04-44:58) and the brutal suppression of anyone who embraces Western ideas.

=== Nowadays, Nokseodang ===
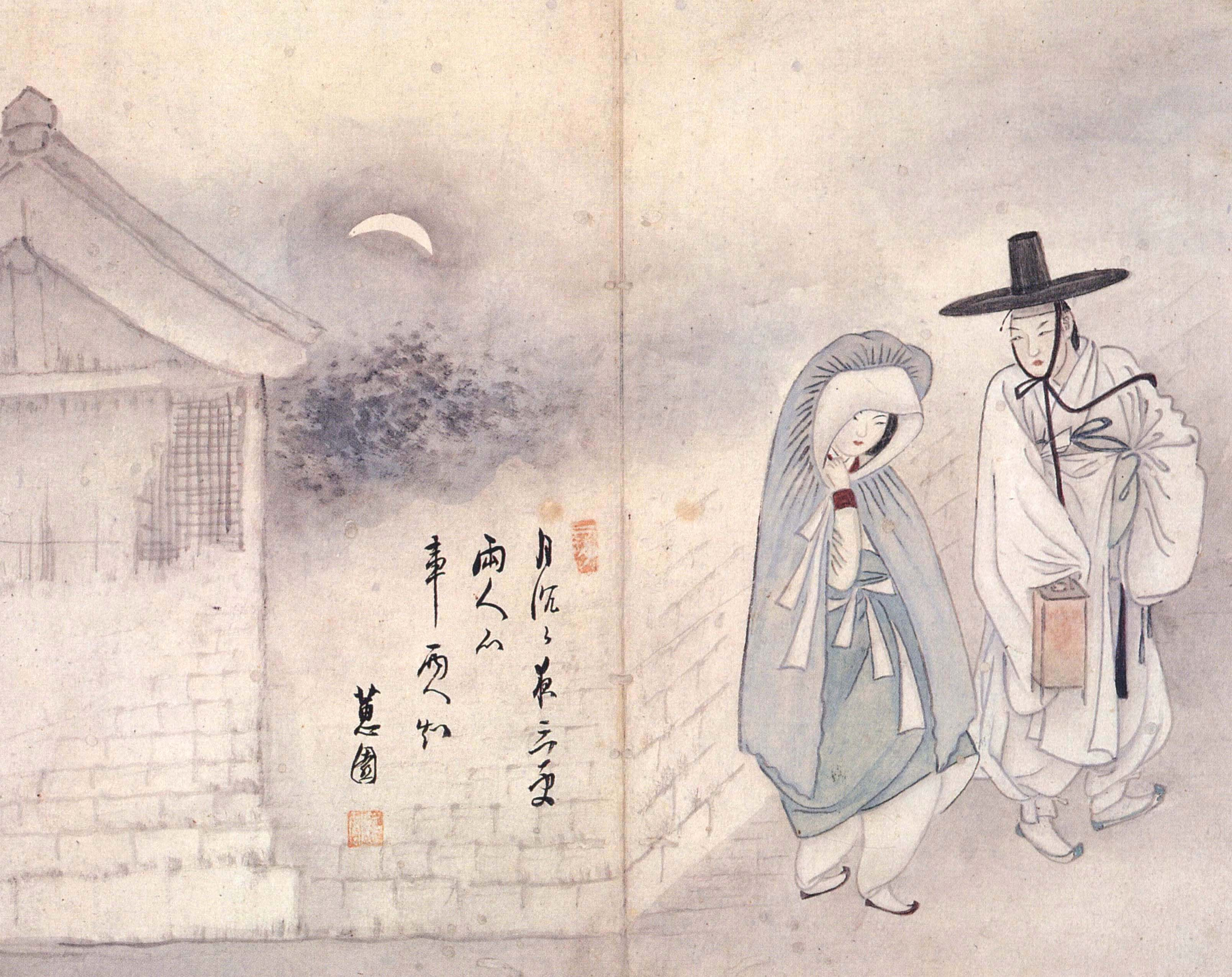
Lovers under the moon, painted by Sin Yun-bok

In the Joseon period, women were objectified and undervalued. But free-spirited lady Goo Hae-ryung is brave enough to follow her own view of life. Still single at 26 years old, she focuses on studying and gaining knowledge, and in defending those who are wronged and abused.

Meanwhile, the young and handsome 20-year-old Prince Dowon has been living his life alone at the Nokseodang (녹서당; 綠嶼堂; lit. 'green island pavilion'). Isolated inside the Huwon Garden, (Note: E07-04:48) he has to stay away from the royal Court and finds comfort by writing Hangul romance novels. Published under the art name Maehwa (매화; 梅花; lit. 'plum blossom'), these novels become famous all over Hanyang, especially to women readers.

The two main characters meet, and this first meeting sparks a war of preferences. But politics disturb the romance. Suddenly, Korean books and European translations are banned, confiscated and burned. All the beard bearing red robes at court are infuriated that "so many noble ladies ran away to find the love of their life after reading Maehwa's books". (Note: E02-08:30) But this is only a "just cause". The real target is "The Story of Hodam", a book about events that occurred twenty years earlier.

In their frenzy to search and destroy every single copy of this book, the king and councilor Min Ik-pyeong go so far as ask for the recruitment of female historians, with the intent of planting spies in each chamber of the Royal Palace. As a result, four female apprentices (Goo Hae-ryung among them) are selected and added to the existing eight recorders. They write the conversations between the royals and their subjects in the everyday collection of sachaek 사책 which will be compiled into the Veritable Records of the Joseon Dynasty. Many gender stereotypes surface, only to be derided... and overcome. The twelve historians become embroiled in disputes with the Court, asserting their right under law to record all conversations between the royal family and courtiers, and even go on strike against the king. (Note: E11-15:44)

A smallpox epidemic will be the event that reconnects the two storylines. On the one hand, members of the court speculate on traditional remedies, and even attempt to kill the Prince by sending him to the infested provinces. On the other hand, Dowon organizes the state answer, seizing and distributing food while applying the 牛痘種書, 瑛眼 (vaccination treaty, by Yeongan) that was provided by the mysterious Moh-wa. Hae-ryung remembers being vaccinated by her father in the past and convinces the Prince to prove the method by being the first patient to be inoculated.

=== Twenty years ago, Seoraewon ===
The corner stone, saying: Ho Dam and Yeongan. This place will open the road (Note: E19-41:05)

A series of flash-backs running through the episodes describes the events of "twenty years ago". The former King, Yi Gyeom, Prince Huiyeong, styled Hodam, founded Seoraewon, together with Seo Mun-jik, styled Yeongan. The latter was Seoraewon's dean, while Hodam was one of its teachers. The teaching team was completed by Barthelemy Dominique, a medicine teacher, who was sent by the Paris Foreign Missions Society. As a result, Seoraewon was a school of Western studies aimed at educating people regardless of social class or gender. "Seoraewon" (서래원; 曙來院) means "Where Dawn Arrives".

This is where Moh-wa learned vaccination and surgery.

A conservative reaction ensued, led by Min Ik-pyeong. A forged letter of the King, allegedly saying "send more priests, and turn Joseon into a Catholic country" (Note: E20-02:38) served as "just cause" for a massacre. Among the rare escapees were Dowon, the newborn son of Hodam, and the 6 year-old Hae-ryung, the daughter of Yeongan.

The series ends three years after "nowadays". Min Ik-pyeong and his proxy king are gone and Seoraewon is reinstated. Prince Yi Jinhas been enthroned. Dowon lives in leisure outside of the Palace, wandering across the world, while Hae-ryung has become a full-ranked member of the Yemungwan. Prince Yi Rim (Dowon) and Hae-ryung are still in a relationship but not married.

=== Quotation ===
(Goo Hae-ryung). "Even if you slash my throat, our brushes will not stop writing. If I die, another historian will take my place; if you kill that historian, another will take their place. Even if you kill every historian in this land, and take away all the paper and brushes, you won't be able to stop us. From mouth to mouth, teacher to student, elder to child, history will be told. That is the power of truth." (Note: E20-17:55)

== Cast ==
=== Main ===
In the Netflix release, the following three characters are put forward in the opening sequence of each episode:

- Shin Se-kyung as Goo Hae-ryung (born Seo Hee-yeon)

A noble lady who becomes one of the four female historians of the royal court. She is the daughter of Seo Moon-jik, the deceased dean of Seoraewon, and has been living with her guardian Jae-kyeong whom she regards as her older brother. She is among those Joseon women wanting to enforce their independence, moral and material as well, and to voice their ideas and opinions. As an historian, she is recognized as someone brave who does not fear anyone, even the King himself. She often cracks jokes even in the most dire circumstances, for example when she is locked in jail.

- Cha Eun-woo as Yi Rim (Prince Dowon)

The first son of the dethroned King Huiyeong Yi Gyeom and the real heir to the throne. Not knowing his true lineage, he secretly works as a romance novelist under his nom de plume "Maehwa,". He does not involve himself in political matters, and regards his uncle King Yi Tae as his father and his cousin Crown Prince Yi Jin as his older brother. Spelled 島遠, (Note: E17-23:39) Dowon means "Remote Island". Until he meets Hae-ryung, Yi Rim leads a pathologically lonely existence. She is his first and only friend.

- Park Ki-woong as Crown Prince Yi Jin

=== People around Hae-ryung ===
- Gong Jung-hwan as Goo Jae-kyeong

Hae-ryung's guardian; former student of medicine and Mo-hwa's classmate in the Seoraewon. He forged the letter used as a "just cause" for the Seorawon massacre. Later, his remorse made him write the banned book The Story of Hodam.

- Yang Jo-a as Seol-geum

Hae-ryung's caretaker and confidant. She is a servant girl who lives vicariously through Hae-ryung's romantic adventures.

- Lee Kwan-hoon as Gak-soi

=== Royal household and court ===
- Kim Min-sang as King Hamyeong Yi Tae

He reluctantly let Yi Rim live but is threatened by Yi Rim's superior claim to the throne. From the beginning the King tries to neutralize Yi Rim as a rival, through sheer neglect.

- Choi Deok-moon as Left State Councillor Min Ik-pyeong
- Kim Ye-rin as Crown Princess Min Woo-hee
- Kim Yeo-jin as Queen Dowager Yim

=== People from the Office of Royal Decrees (Yemun-gwan) ===
==== The elders ====
- Lee Ji-hoon as Min Woo-won
- Heo Jeong-do as Yang Si-haeng
- Kang Hoon as Hyeon Kyeong-mook
- Nam Tae-woo as Son Gil-seung
- Yoon Jung-sub as Hwang Jang-goon
- Ji Gun-woo as Seong Seo-kwon
- Oh Hee-joon as Ahn Hong-ik
- Lee Jung-ha as Kimchi Guuk

==== The other three female apprentices ====
- Park Ji-hyun as Song Sa-hee
- Lee Ye-rim as Oh Eun-im
- Jang Yoo-bin as Heo Ah-ran

=== Others ===
- Jeon Ye-seo as Mo-hwa, a confidant of the Queen Dowager, skilled in archery, former student of medicine in the Seoraewon
- Sung Ji-ru as Heo Sam-bo, Prince Yi Rim's eunuch. He gives some atrocious courtship tips to Yi Rim.
- Ryu Tae-ho as Song Jae-cheon, "M. Yes", father of Song Sa-hee
- Kim Yong-un as Gwi Jae, Min Ik-pyeong's handy man

=== Special appearances ===
- Seo Young-joo as Lee Seung-hoon : Hae-ryung husband-to-be, then magistrate of Songhwahyeon, E07
- Fabien Yoon as:
  - Jean Baptiste Barthélemy - a beomnanseoin (French national) who came to Joseon to look for his older brother
  - Dominique - Jean's deceased older brother; teacher of medicine in the Seoraewon
- Yoon Jong-hoon as Prince Huiyeong Yi Gyeom (a.k.a. Hodam)

The dethroned King and Prince Yi Rim's biological father

- Lee Seung-hyo as Seo Moon-jik (a.k.a. Yeongan)

Hae-ryung's biological father who was executed for treason charges 20 years ago. He was the dean of Seoraewon

- Lee Do-yeop as Shim Geum-yeol.
- Woo Mi-hwa as Go Hae-ryung's teacher.

== Production ==
The drama's entire 13 billion won budget was financed by Netflix. Yeolhwajeong Pavilion—located in Ganggol Village, Deungnyang-myeon, Boseong County—is one of the filming locations of the series.

== Original soundtrack ==
Rookie Historian Goo Hae-ryung OST Special Album

Soundtrack album by Various artists
- Recorded: June 2019
- Genre: Soundtrack
- Languages: Korean; English
- Label: Pan Entertainment

=== Part 1 ===
Released on July 17, 2019
| No. | Title | Lyrics | Music | Artist | Length |
|---|---|---|---|---|---|
| 1. | "Fall in Luv" | Lee Na-young | KZ; Taebongie; Nam Woo-hyun; CLEF CREW | Henry | 03:38 |
| 2. | "Fall in Luv" (Inst.) | | KZ; Taebongie; Nam Woo-hyun; CLEF CREW | | 03:38 |
| Total length: | | | | | 07:16 |

=== Part 2 ===
Released on August 7, 2019
| No. | Title | Lyrics | Music | Artist | Length |
|---|---|---|---|---|---|
| 1. | "My Dream" | Lee Na-young | Kanasus brew; Na Eun | Yoon Mi-rae | 03:54 |
| 2. | "My Dream" (Inst.) | | Kanasus brew; Na Eun | | 03:54 |
| Total length: | | | | | 07:48 |

=== Part 3 ===
Released on August 21, 2019
| No. | Title | Lyrics | Music | Artist | Length |
|---|---|---|---|---|---|
| 1. | "Come" (어서와) | GamDongis; Kim Young-sung | Seo Jae-ha; Kim Young-sung; Do Hoon | Lee Seok-hoon (SG Wannabe) | 04:02 |
| 2. | "Come" (Inst.) | | Seo Jae-ha; Kim Young-sung; Do Hoon | | 04:02 |
| Total length: | | | | | 08:04 |

=== Part 4 ===
Released on September 4, 2019
| No. | Title | Lyrics | Music | Artist | Length |
|---|---|---|---|---|---|
| 1. | "You Are My Love" (처음부터 내 사랑) | Lee Na-young; Chae-ul | Lee Na-young; Cha Gil-wan | Lucia | 03:58 |
| 2. | "You Are My Love" (Inst.) | | Lee Na-young; Cha Gil-wan | | 03:58 |
| Total length: | | | | | 07:56 |

=== Part 5 ===
Released on September 11, 2019
| No. | Title | Lyrics | Music | Artist | Length |
|---|---|---|---|---|---|
| 1. | "Forever" (영원토록) | Park Soo-jin | Kwon Bin-gi | Park Soo-jin | 03:01 |
| 2. | "Forever" (Inst.) | | Kwon Bin-gi | | 03:01 |
| Total length: | | | | | 06:02 |

=== Part 6 ===
Released on September 18, 2019
| No. | Title | Lyrics | Music | Artist | Length |
|---|---|---|---|---|---|
| 1. | "Please Remember" (기억해줘요) | Ha Na | Seo Jae-ha; Kim Young-sung | Cha Eun-woo (Astro) | 03:33 |
| 2. | "Please Remember" (Inst.) | | Seo Jae-ha; Kim Young-sung | | 03:33 |
| Total length: | | | | | 07:06 |

Disc 2:
| No. | Title | Artist | Length |
|---|---|---|---|
| 1. | "Rookie Historian Goo Hae-ryung" (Opening Title) | Kim Ji-eun | 1:20 |
| 2. | "Blossom" | Lee Sa-ya | 2:19 |
| 3. | "Run" | Dacapo | 1:46 |
| 4. | "On a Dazzling Day" | Lee Sa-ya | 2:31 |
| 5. | "Be a Flower" | Park Jong-mi | 4:02 |
| 6. | "Hanbang Romance" | Na Won-hye | 2:01 |
| 7. | "My Dear" | Park Jong-mi | 2:48 |
| 8. | "Nima" | Supersound | 2:34 |
| 9. | "History on Records" | Lee Sa-ya | 1:43 |
| 10. | "A Moonlit" | Im Na-rae | 2:50 |
| 11. | "Feather" | Supersound | 2:19 |
| 12. | "Behind Story" | Yoon Yoo-jin | 2:31 |
| 13. | "Las Estrellas" | Supersound | 3:36 |
| 14. | "Four Notes" | Im Na-rae | 2:18 |
| 15. | "Dawn of War" | Supersound | 2:45 |
| 16. | "Shadow" | Supersound | 2:35 |
| 17. | "Solitude" | Im Na-rae | 2:22 |
| 18. | "Swaying Lanterns" | Kim Ji-eun | 3:35 |
| 19. | "Longing" | Kim Ji-eun | 3:39 |
| 20. | "The Secret place in your heart" | Dacapo | 3:50 |
| Total length: | | | 43:36 |

== Viewership ==
Rookie Historian Goo Hae-ryung : South Korea viewers per episode (thousands)

| Episodes | Episode number | | | | | | | | | |
| Episodes | 1 | 2 | 3 | 4 | 5 | 6 | 7 | 8 | 9 | 10 |
|---|---|---|---|---|---|---|---|---|---|---|
| 1–10 | N/A | 937 | N/A | 798 | N/A | 1031 | 946 | 1165 | N/A | 1026 |
| 11–20 | 810 | 1143 | 889 | 1213 | 773 | 1093 | N/A | 979 | N/A | 1206 |
| 21–30 | N/A | 1060 | 833 | 1183 | N/A | 921 | 749 | 1123 | N/A | 862 |
| 31–40 | 649 | 876 | N/A | 909 | N/A | 785 | N/A | 970 | 686 | 1023 |

Source: Audience measurement performed nationwide by Nielsen Media Research.

| Ep. | Original broadcast date | Average audience share | |
| Ep. | Original broadcast date | AGB Nielsen | |
| Ep. | Original broadcast date | Nationwide | Seoul |
|---|---|---|---|
| 1 | July 17, 2019 | 4.0% (NR) | —N/a |
| 2 | July 17, 2019 | 6.0% (14th) | 6.7% (9th) |
| 3 | July 18, 2019 | 3.7% (NR) | —N/a |
| 4 | July 18, 2019 | 5.0% (18th) | 5.1% (19th) |
| 5 | July 24, 2019 | 4.5% (NR) | —N/a |
| 6 | July 24, 2019 | 6.4% (14th) | 6.4% (12th) |
| 7 | July 25, 2019 | 5.6% (17th) | 5.8% (13th) |
| 8 | July 25, 2019 | 6.8% (11th) | 7.3% (10th) |
| 9 | July 31, 2019 | 4.4% (NR) | —N/a |
| 10 | July 31, 2019 | 7.3% (7th) | 7.6% (8th) |
| 11 | August 1, 2019 | 4.7% (18th) | 5.1% (17th) |
| 12 | August 1, 2019 | 6.9% (8th) | 7.2% (6th) |
| 13 | August 7, 2019 | 5.1% (19th) | 5.2% (19th) |
| 14 | August 7, 2019 | 6.8% (13th) | 7.0% (10th) |
| 15 | August 8, 2019 | 4.7% (19th) | 4.9% (17th) |
| 16 | August 8, 2019 | 6.4% (12th) | 6.5% (9th) |
| 17 | August 14, 2019 | 4.1% (NR) | —N/a |
| 18 | August 14, 2019 | 6.2% (12th) | 6.8% (9th) |
| 19 | August 15, 2019 | 4.2% (NR) | —N/a |
| 20 | August 15, 2019 | 6.5% (11th) | 6.4% (10th) |
| 21 | August 21, 2019 | 4.3% (NR) | —N/a |
| 22 | August 21, 2019 | 6.2% (12th) | 6.3% (11th) |
| 23 | August 22, 2019 | 4.9% (20th) | 5.2% (17th) |
| 24 | August 22, 2019 | 7.1% (9th) | 7.6% (8th) |
| 25 | August 28, 2019 | 3.8% (NR) | —N/a |
| 26 | August 28, 2019 | 5.9% (14th) | 6.1% (9th) |
| 27 | August 29, 2019 | 4.4% (NR) | 4.8% (19th) |
| 28 | August 29, 2019 | 6.9% (8th) | 7.4% (7th) |
| 29 | September 4, 2019 | 3.7% (NR) | —N/a |
| 30 | September 4, 2019 | 5.5% (16th) | 5.5% (17th) |
| 31 | September 5, 2019 | 4.0% (NR) | —N/a |
| 32 | September 5, 2019 | 5.4% (16th) | 5.6% (15th) |
| 33 | September 18, 2019 | 4.0% (NR) | —N/a |
| 34 | September 18, 2019 | 6.0% (14th) | 6.0% (13th) |
| 35 | September 19, 2019 | 3.8% (NR) | —N/a |
| 36 | September 19, 2019 | 5.0% (17th) | 5.2% (14th) |
| 37 | September 25, 2019 | 4.0% (NR) | —N/a |
| 38 | September 25, 2019 | 6.2% (13th) | 6.2% (11th) |
| 39 | September 26, 2019 | 4.5% (NR) | 4.7% (19th) |
| 40 | September 26, 2019 | 6.6% (10th) | 6.6% (10th) |
| Average | | 5.3% | — (Note: Due to some ratings not recorded, the exact average rating is unknown.) |

== Awards and nominations ==
| Year | Award | Category | Recipient | Result | Ref. |
|---|---|---|---|---|---|
| 2019 | MBC Drama Awards | Grand Prize (Daesang) | Shin Se-kyung | Nominated | |
| 2019 | MBC Drama Awards | Drama of the Year | Rookie Historian Goo Hae-ryung | Nominated | |
| 2019 | MBC Drama Awards | Top Excellence Award, Actress in a Wednesday-Thursday Drama | Shin Se-kyung | Won | |
| 2019 | MBC Drama Awards | Excellence Award, Actor in a Wednesday-Thursday Drama | Cha Eun-woo | Won | |
| 2019 | MBC Drama Awards | Excellence Award, Actor in a Wednesday-Thursday Drama | Park Ki-woong | Nominated | |
| 2019 | MBC Drama Awards | Excellence Award, Actress in a Wednesday-Thursday Drama | Park Ji-hyun | Nominated | |
| 2019 | MBC Drama Awards | Best Supporting Cast in a Wednesday-Thursday Drama | Lee Ji-hoon | Won | |
| 2019 | MBC Drama Awards | Best Couple Award | Cha Eun-woo and Shin Se-kyung | Won | |
