= A Girl Who Sees Smells =

South Korean television series

- Promotional poster
- Also known as: Girl Who Sees Smell
- Hangul: 냄새를 보는 소녀
- RR: Naemsaereul boneun sonyeo
- MR: Naemsaerŭl ponŭn sonyŏ
- Genre: Romance; Supernatural
- Based on: The Girl Who Sees Smells by Seo Soo-kyung aka Man Chwi
- Written by: Lee Hee-myung
- Directed by: Baek Soo-chan; Oh Chung-hwan
- Starring: Park Yoo-chun; Shin Se-kyung; Namkoong Min; Yoon Jin-seo
- Music by: Park Se-joon
- Country of origin: South Korea
- Original language: Korean
- No. of episodes: 16

Production
- Executive producer: Kim Yong-jin
- Producers: Lee Yong-seok; Min Yeon-hong; Jang Sung-wook
- Cinematography: Lee Gil-bok; Jung Min-gyun
- Editor: Jang Si-yeon
- Running time: 65 minutes
- Production company: SBS Plus

Original release
- Network: SBS TV
- Release: April 1 – May 21, 2015

A Girl Who Sees Smells (Korean: 냄새를 보는 소녀) is a 2015 South South Korean drama adapted from the KTOON webtoon of the same title by Seo Soo-kyung a/k/a Man Chwi. (Note: "Man Chwi" is a syllabic abbreviation of the Korean phrase Manhwa-e chwihada (만화에 취하다; lit. "Get into the comic").) Starring Park Yoo-chun, Shin Se-kyung, Namgoong Min and Yoon Jin-seo, it aired on SBS on Wednesday and Thursday at 21:55 for 16 episodes from April 1 to May 21, 2015.

Its early working title was Sensory Couple (감각남녀; Gamgak namnyeo), before reverting to the name of the original webtoon. It reached top of the Contents Power Index (CPI) rankings for the most influential dramas.

== Plot ==
Choi Eun-seol (Shin Se-kyung) arrives home to find her parents murdered. When they are later found with a barcode carved into their skin, detective Oh Jae-pyo (Jung In-gi) realizes that the now-comatose daughter Eun-seol is the sole surviving witness. That same night, Choi Moo-gak (Park Yoo-chun) is at the hospital visiting his younger sister (Kim So-hyun), also named Choi Eun-seol, who is treated for mild injuries after a bus accident. However, when Moo-gak returns to her bed, he finds her dead with her throat slit.

Eun-seol comes out of her coma six months later, but has no memories at all of her life before waking up at the hospital, and her left eye has turned blue with no scientific explanation. She has also gained the unique ability to "see" smells as visible colors and shapes, and can even trace where people have been because their lingering scents are like a trail. Wanting to protect her, Jae-pyo adopts her and invents a new life for her, telling her that he is her real father and that her name is Oh Cho-rim. Three years and six months pass, and Cho-rim is a cheerful girl who's adjusted to her ability. She dreams of a becoming a comedian and works as a gofer for a small theater company called Frog Troupe.

== Cast ==
=== Main ===
- Park Yoo-chun as Detective Choi Moo-gak, the male lead of the series. After the murder of his sister, Moo-gak is determined to become a police inspector and take revenge for his sister's death. He is desensitised and is unable to smell or taste his food.
- Shin Se-kyung as Oh Cho-rim/Choi Eun-seol, the female lead who witnessed the murder of her parents and lived on as the sole witness of the barcode serial murders. She has a strange ability, being able to see smells as patterns in the air. Eun-seol forms a team with Moo-gak, with whom she works to solve barcode murders.
- Namkoong Min as Chef Kwon Jae-hee/Jay Kwon Ford
- Yoon Jin-seo as Yeom Mi

=== Supporting ===
- Jung In-gi as Oh Jae-pyo
- Nam Chang-hee as Jo In-bae
- Oh Cho-hee as Eo Woo-ya
- Jung Chan-woo as Wang Ji-bang
- Park Jin-joo as Ma Ae-ri
- Lee Won-jong as Kang Hyuk
- Choi Tae-joon as Ye Sang-gil
- Jo Hee-bong as Ki Choong-do
- Kim Byeong-ok as Chief of Police
- Choi Jae-hwan as Tak Ji-seok
- Jung Hyun-suk as Detective Kim
- Kim Gi-cheon as Kim Joong-in
- Song Jong-ho as Dr. Chun Baek-kyung
- Heo Jung-eun as Ji-eun

=== Special appearances ===
- Kim So-hyun as Choi Eun-seol (ep 1–2, 5)
- Kim Dong-kyun as Park Hyung-jin (ep 1)
- Bang Eun-hee as Yang Mi-yeon (ep 1)
- Heo Joon-suk as Kang Sang-moon (ep 1)
- Kim Bo-mi as Convenience store clerk (ep 1)
- Kim Il-joong as himself, TV Entertainment Tonight hosts (ep 1)
- Jang Ye-won as herself, TV Entertainment Tonight hosts (ep 1)
- Running Man cast as Themselves (ep 1)
- Park Han-byul as Joo Ma-ri (ep 2)
- Oh Jung-tae as Autoclub employee (ep 2)
- Park Young-soo as Arrested man at the police station (ep 2)
- Dan-woo as Driver that hit a car in the mountain (ep 2–3)
- Son Se-bin as Driver's girlfriend (ep 2–3)
- Ha Soo-ho as Hwang Ki-soo (ep 4)
- Kim Ho-chang as Tak Min-seok (ep 4)
- Oh Tae-kyung as Yang Seok-jin (ep 5)
- Lee Jung-shin as Himself (ep 6)
- Julian Quintart (ep 10)

== Ratings ==
Episode #	Original broadcast date	Average audience share			
Episode #	Original broadcast date	TNmS Ratings		AGB Nielsen	
Episode #	Original broadcast date	Nationwide	Seoul National Capital Area	Nationwide	Seoul National Capital Area
1	April 1, 2015	5.6%	7.1%	5.6%	6.1%
2	April 2, 2015	6.0%	6.6%	6.1%	6.8%
3	April 8, 2015	6.6%	7.1%	7.0%	7.9%
4	April 9, 2015	7.8%	8.8%	7.8%	8.0%
5	April 15, 2015	7.4%	8.4%	7.1%	7.5%
6	April 16, 2015	8.5%	9.8%	7.5%	7.7%
7	April 22, 2015	7.3%	8.0%	8.1%	8.4%
8	April 23, 2015	9.2%	10.5%	8.3%	8.5%
9	April 29, 2015	7.9%	8.5%	6.8%	7.0%
10	April 30, 2015	9.3%	10.7%	8.0%	8.4%
11	May 6, 2015	8.0%	9.4%	7.5%	8.1%
12	May 7, 2015	8.6%	9.8%	6.9%	6.7%
13	May 13, 2015	9.1%	10.6%	8.7%	9.2%
14	May 14, 2015	10.1%	11.4%	9.5%	9.7%
15	May 20, 2015	10.9%	13.5%	9.6%	9.5%
16	May 21, 2015	11.9%	14.4%	10.8%	11.4%
Average		8.4%	9.7%	7.8%	8.2%

== Awards and nominations ==
Year	Awards	Category	Recipient	Result
2015	8th Korea Drama Awards	Top Excellence Award, Actor	Park Yoo-chun	Nominated
2015	4th APAN Star Awards	Excellence Award, Actress in a Miniseries	Shin Se-kyung	Nominated
2015	23rd SBS Drama Awards	Top Excellence Award, Actor in a Miniseries	Park Yoo-chun	Won
2015	23rd SBS Drama Awards	Excellence Award, Actress in a Miniseries	Shin Se-kyung	Nominated
2015	23rd SBS Drama Awards	Special Award, Actor in a Miniseries	Namkoong Min	Won
2015	23rd SBS Drama Awards	Special Award, Actress in a Miniseries	Yoon Jin-seo	Won
2015	23rd SBS Drama Awards	Best Couple Award	Park Yoo-chun and Shin Se-kyung	Nominated
2015	Melon Music Awards	Best OST	"Spring Is Gone by Chance" by Yuju & Loco	Won
