= Blade Man =

2014 South Korean television series

- Promotional poster
- Also known as: Iron Man
- Genre: Romance; Fantasy; Drama; Comedy
- Created by: KBS Drama Production
- Written by: Kim Kyu-wan
- Directed by: Kim Yong-soo; Kim Jong-yeon
- Starring: Lee Dong-wook; Shin Se-kyung
- Country of origin: South Korea
- Original language: Korean
- No. of episodes: 18

Production
- Executive producers: Bae Kyung-soo; KBS Drama
- Producer: Im Se-joon
- Production location: Korea
- Production companies: iHQ; Gazi Contents

Original release
- Network: Korean Broadcasting System
- Release: September 10 – November 13, 2014

Blade Man (Korean: 아이언맨; RR: Aieonmaen; lit. Iron Man) is a 2014 South Korean television series starring Lee Dong-wook and Shin Se-kyung. It aired on KBS2 from September 10 to November 13, 2014, for 18 episodes.

== Plot ==
Joo Hong-bin (Lee Dong-wook) is a wealthy man with a prickly demeanor who develops a supernatural ability - his anger and mental pain manifest as knives sprouting from his body. He meets Son Se-dong (Shin Se-kyung), a warmhearted girl who becomes entangled in his life. As they fall in love, she slowly heals his heart and he learns to deal with his inner pain and newfound power.

== Cast ==
=== Main characters ===
- Lee Dong-wook as Joo Hong-bin
- Shin Se-kyung as Son Se-dong
- Kim Kap-soo as Joo Jang-won
- Han Eun-jung as Kim Tae-hee

=== Supporting characters ===
- Jung Yoo-geun as Joo Chang
- Lee Mi-sook as Madam Yoon
- Han Jung-soo as Secretary Go
- Lee Joo-seung as Joo Hong-joo
- Kim Sun-woong as Kyung Ho
- Yoon Da-kyung as Yeon Mi-jung
- Song Kyung-chul as Gardener
- Shin Seung-hwan as Seung-hwan
- Sun Woong as Kyung-ho
- Kim Jae-young as Je-gil
- Kang Da-bin as Soo-jae
- Jin Ju-hyung as Jung-joon
- Lee Seung-ho as Go Yoon-seok
- Kim Hyung-bum as Se-dong's senior colleague
- Ra Mi-ran as Elisa Park
- Jung Jin as Oh Joong-shik
- Lee Dal-hyung as Chauffeur
- Choi Young-in as Housekeeper
- Kim Mi-kyung as Housekeeper
- Kim Poo-reun Ba-da as Kim Sun-woo
- Kim Kyu-chul as Jo Bong-gu
- Kim Sun-hye as Tae-hee's colleague
- Lee Seung-ho as Yoon-seok
- Son Young-hak
- Park Gun-rak

== Original soundtrack ==
Blade Man OST

Soundtrack album by Various artists
- Recorded: 2014
- Genre: Soundtrack
- Language: Korean; English
- Label: Sony Music

=== Part 1 ===
Released on September 24, 2014
No.	Title	Artist	Length
1.	"Hello" (비밀낙원)	Park Gyu-ri and Han Seung-yeon	3:21
2.	"Hello" (Inst.)		3:21
Total length:			6:42

=== Part 2 ===
Released on October 2, 2014
No.	Title	Artist	Length
1.	"I Love You" (비밀낙원)	Jisook and Hyunyoung (Rainbow)	3:39
2.	"I Love You" (Inst.)		3:39
Total length:			7:38

=== Part 3 ===
Released on October 16, 2014
No.	Title	Artist	Length
1.	"Sad Love Waltz" (비밀낙원)	Nemesis	4:46
2.	"Sad Love Waltz" (Inst.)		4:46
Total length:			8:42

=== Part 4 ===
Released on October 29, 2014
No.	Title	Artist	Length
1.	"I Love, but It's Not Love" (비밀낙원)	Lee Soo-young	4:12
2.	"I Love, but It's Not Love" (Inst.)		4:12
Total length:			8:24

Disc 2:
No.	Title	Artist	Length
1.	"Justice for All" (Opening Title)	Various Artists	3:32
2.	"After Love"	Various Artists	4:14
3.	"Curious Mandolin"	Various Artists	1:49
4.	"Curious Man"	Various Artists	3:15
5.	"Black Crow"	Various Artists	3:52
6.	"Happy Dayz"	Various Artists	1:42
7.	"Iron Tango"	Various Artists	1:51
8.	"No Question"	Various Artists	2:15
9.	"Origin of Love"	Various Artists	4:09
10.	"Where Is Love?"	Various Artists	3:24

== Ratings ==
Episode #	Original broadcast date	Average audience share			
Episode #	Original broadcast date	TNmS Ratings		AGB Nielsen	
Episode #	Original broadcast date	Nationwide	Seoul National Capital Area	Nationwide	Seoul National Capital Area
1	September 10, 2014	6.0%	6.6%	6.6%	7.0%
2	September 11, 2014	4.8%	5.7%	5.7%	5.8%
3	September 17, 2014	5.0%	5.6%	5.6%	5.5%
4	September 18, 2014	4.6%	5.1%	5.0%	5.0%
5	September 24, 2014	4.5%	5.5%	5.5%	5.7%
6	September 25, 2014	5.7%	6.3%	6.9%	7.1%
7	October 1, 2014	4.8%	5.6%	5.0%	5.1%
8	October 8, 2014	3.5%	4.7%	4.3%	4.1%
9	October 9, 2014	4.1%	5.0%	4.7%	4.5%
10	October 15, 2014	3.3%	4.3%	4.1%	4.2%
11	October 16, 2014	3.8%	4.8%	4.3%	4.1%
12	October 22, 2014	4.6%	4.7%	5.1%	5.1%
13	October 23, 2014	4.0%	4.5%	4.1%	3.6%
14	October 29, 2014	5.1%	6.1%	5.2%	5.3%
15	October 30, 2014	3.4%	3.5%	4.3%	4.5%
16	November 6, 2014	2.9%	3.4%	4.0%	4.6%
17	November 12, 2014	2.8%	3.6%	3.2%	3.8%
18	November 13, 2014	2.2%	2.9%	3.4%	3.9%
Average		4.1%	4.8%	4.8%	4.9%
