= Arthdal Chronicles =

South Korean television series

- Promotional poster for season two
- Also known as: Arthdal Chronicles: The Sword of Aramun
- Hangul: 아스달 연대기
- Hanja: 아스달 年代記
- RR: Aseudal yeondaegi
- MR: Asŭdal yŏndaegi
- Genre: Fantasy; Period drama
- Developed by: Studio Dragon (planning)
- Written by: Kim Young-hyun; Park Sang-yeon
- Directed by: Kim Won-seok (season 1); Kim Kwang-sik (season 2)
- Starring: Jang Dong-gun; Song Joong-ki (season 1); Kim Ji-won (season 1); Lee Joon-gi (season 2); Shin Se-kyung (season 2); Kim Ok-vin
- Music by: Kim Joon-seok (season 1); Kim Tae-seong (season 2)
- Country of origin: South Korea
- Original language: Korean
- No. of seasons: 2
- No. of episodes: 30

Production
- Executive producers: Kim Young-gyu (season 1); Lee Ki-hyuk (season 2)
- Producers: Jang Jin-wook; Jo Nam-hyung; Shin Ye-ji; Ham Seung-hoon
- Production locations: South Korea; Brunei
- Camera setup: Single camera
- Running time: 75–80 minutes
- Production companies: Studio Dragon; KPJ Corporation
- Budget: ₩54 billion (season 1)

Original release
- Network: tvN
- Release: June 1, 2019 – October 22, 2023

Arthdal Chronicles (Korean: 아스달 연대기) is a South Korean television series written by Kim Young-hyun and Park Sang-yeon and directed by Kim Won-seok, under the production banner of Studio Dragon and KPJ. It stars Jang Dong-gun and Kim Ok-vin in both seasons, joined by Song Joong-ki and Kim Ji-won in the first season, and Lee Joon-gi and Shin Se-kyung in the second season. Regarded as the first Korean ancient fantasy drama, the story takes place during the Bronze Age and is loosely based on the story of Dangun, the founder of the first Korean Kingdom of Gojoseon and Asadal, the capital (which the series is loosely named after). The first season aired on tvN from June 1 to September 22, 2019, every Saturday and Sunday at 21:00 (KST). The second season aired on tvN from September 9 to October 22, 2023, every Saturday and Sunday at 21:20 (KST). It is available for streaming on Netflix for the first season and on Disney+ for the second season in selected regions.

In spite of the generally mixed to negative reception from critics, the series was the sixth most preferred Korean drama among viewers in the United States market in 2019 per Consumer Research Report by the Korea Creative Content Agency.

== Synopsis ==
In a mythical land called Arth, the inhabitants of the ancient city of Arthdal contend with power struggles, while some encounter love along the way. Eun-seom goes through hardships to bring his tribe back to life and learns of his true origins in the process.

== Cast and characters ==
- Jang Dong-gun as Ta-gon
- Song Joong-ki (season 1) and Lee Joon-gi (season 2) as Eun-seom and Saya
- Kim Ji-won (season 1) and Shin Se-kyung (season 2) as Tan-ya
- Kim Ok-vin as Taealha

== Production ==
=== Season 1 ===
The cast and crew attended a workshop in Yangju, Gyeonggi Province, on August 21, 2018. The first script reading was held on August 26, 2018. Filming officially started on December 5, 2018 with the opening ceremony of the set in Osan, whose construction took place for eight months. The drama was also filmed overseas in Brunei, with Song Joong-ki departing first on February 24, 2019.

The drama serves as a reunion project for Song Joong-ki and Kim Ji-won who both starred in the 2016 hit drama Descendants of the Sun.

=== Season 2 ===
On February 12, 2020, it was announced that the drama was renewed for a second season. On June 11, 2020, the production schedule was postponed due to the COVID-19 pandemic, excluding the series from the 2021 lineup.

In February 2022, it was announced that the second season was expected to be released in early 2023 along with a webtoon and an MMORPG. Writers Kim Young-hyun and Park Sang-yeon were in charge of the script again, with Kim Kwang-sik as director. Titled Arthdal Chronicles: The Sword of Aramun (Korean: 아라문의 검-아스달 연대기), the season is set about eight years after the first one; thus, Lee Joon-gi and Shin Se-kyung replaced Song Joong-ki and Kim Ji-won as the adult versions of Eun-seom and Tan-ya, while Jang Dong-gun and Kim Ok-vin reprised their roles. Filming began on August 23, 2022 and took place in Jeju Island. Shin finished filming her part on April 4, 2023. Filming was completed on May 2, 2023.

== Episodes ==
| Season | Episodes | Originally released | |
| Season | Episodes | First released | Last released |
|---|---|---|---|
| 1 | 18 | June 1, 2019 | September 22, 2019 |
| 2 | 12 | September 9, 2023 | October 22, 2023 |

=== Season 1 ===
| No. | Title | Original release date |
|---|---|---|
| 0 | "Special" | May 26, 2019 |
| 1 | "Episode 1" | June 1, 2019 |
| 2 | "Episode 2" | June 2, 2019 |
| 3 | "Episode 3" | June 8, 2019 |
| 4 | "Episode 4" | June 9, 2019 |
| 5 | "Episode 5" | June 15, 2019 |
| 6 | "Episode 6" | June 16, 2019 |
| 7 | "Episode 7" | June 22, 2019 |
| 8 | "Episode 8" | June 23, 2019 |
| 9 | "Episode 9" | June 29, 2019 |
| 10 | "Episode 10" | June 30, 2019 |
| 11 | "Episode 11" | July 6, 2019 |
| 12 | "Episode 12" | July 7, 2019 |
| 13 | "Episode 13" | September 7, 2019 |
| 14 | "Episode 14" | September 8, 2019 |
| 15 | "Episode 15" | September 14, 2019 |
| 16 | "Episode 16" | September 15, 2019 |
| 17 | "Episode 17" | September 21, 2019 |
| 18 | "Episode 18" | September 22, 2019 |

=== Season 2 ===
| No. | Title | Original release date |
|---|---|---|
| 1 | "Weak Ones (약한 자들이여)" | September 9, 2023 |
| 2 | "War of Twins (배냇벗 전쟁)" | September 10, 2023 |
| 3 | "Wahan's Lover (와한의 연인)" | September 16, 2023 |
| 4 | "Purple Blood (보라색 피)" | September 17, 2023 |
| 5 | "Aramun's Sword (아라문의 검)" | September 23, 2023 |
| 6 | "Fake Inaishingi (가짜 이나이신기)" | September 23, 2023 |
| 7 | "Ikomahis (이코마히스)" | October 8, 2023 |
| 8 | "The Strongest Creature Under the Sky (하늘 아래 최강의 생물)" | October 8, 2023 |
| 9 | "Remember My Face (기억하라, 내 얼굴을)" | October 14, 2023 |
| 10 | "Whirlwind Fire (회오리불)" | October 15, 2023 |
| 11 | "Heroines" | October 21, 2023 |
| 12 | "Arthdal Chronicles (아스달 연대기)" | October 22, 2023 |

== Reception ==
=== Critical reception ===
The first season of the drama received mixed reviews. It was criticized by Game of Thrones fans for sharing similarities with that series, while critics felt that it employed poor use of CGI, had a formulaic plot, was similar to other foreign fantasy dramas and films centered on ancient times, and had a slow-paced storyline, which could make viewers lose interest. Viewers were also bewildered by the anachronistic use of armors and weapons.

Conversely, the drama was praised for its intriguing storyline and unique setting, touching on subjects like the meaning of a tribe, an alliance and a nation, as well as religion. Writer Park Sang-yeon said, "I wouldn't even think of comparing our series to [Game of Thrones] and I don't think our goal is to create something similar... I wouldn't try to claim to do anything similar to the show and I don't think it's an appropriate comparison." He added, "We tried to create a great series by building a fictitious world of our own with our imagination and I hope you see our series as it is."

Although John Serba of Decider.com gave the first season a "Skip It" rating, he said, "Arthdal occurs in a more primitive time than [Game of Thrones], and appears to be set up to explore different ideas about the human creature and its thirst for power and possessions." He said that the show further differentiated itself from Game of Thrones by its absence of nudity and sex scenes. Forbes contributor Joan MacDonald said, "Stunning camera work makes The Arthdal Chronicles a visual pleasure to watch, capturing sweeping panoramas that place fledgeling humans in the context of a wide world waiting to be explored—and possibly conquered."

=== Viewership ===
In South Korea, the first season received lower-than-expected viewership ratings, in comparison to its massive budget. The first episode recorded average ratings of 6.7% and peaked at 8%, taking first place for all dramas in its time slot, including non-cable broadcasting stations. The season's personal record of 7.7% was on its fourth episode. Its finale scored an average rating of 7.4% nationwide.

Arthdal Chronicles : South Korea viewers per episode (millions)

| Season | Episode number | | | | | | | | | | | | | | | | | | Average |
| Season | 1 | 2 | 3 | 4 | 5 | 6 | 7 | 8 | 9 | 10 | 11 | 12 | 13 | 14 | 15 | 16 | 17 | 18 | Average |
|---|---|---|---|---|---|---|---|---|---|---|---|---|---|---|---|---|---|---|---|
| 1 | 1.840 | 2.001 | 1.674 | 2.120 | 1.507 | 1.930 | 1.490 | 1.597 | 1.610 | 1.865 | 1.632 | 1.813 | 1.728 | 1.970 | 1.461 | 1.812 | 1.720 | 1.999 | 1.765 |
| 2 | 1.212 | 1.046 | 1.084 | 1.122 | 0.790 | 0.488 | 0.842 | 0.744 | 0.717 | 0.980 | 0.615 | 1.110 | – | | | | | | 0.896 |

Source: Audience measurement performed nationwide by Nielsen Korea.

==== Season 1 ====
Average TV viewership ratings (season 1)
| Ep. | Original broadcast date | Average audience share (Nielsen Korea) | |
| Ep. | Original broadcast date | Nationwide | Seoul |
Part 1: The Children of Prophecy (Note: Korean: 예언의 아이들; RR: Yeeonui aideul)
| 1 | June 1, 2019 | 6.729% | 7.736% |
| 2 | June 2, 2019 | 7.310% | 8.222% |
| 3 | June 8, 2019 | 6.435% | 6.454% |
| 4 | June 9, 2019 | 7.705% | 8.952% |
| 5 | June 15, 2019 | 5.787% | 5.955% |
| 6 | June 16, 2019 | 7.226% | 7.757% |
Part 2: The Sky Turning Inside Out, Rising Land (Note: Korean: 뒤집히는 하늘, 일어나는 땅; RR: Dwijipineun haneul, ir-eonaneun ttang)
| 7 | June 22, 2019 | 5.792% | 6.199% |
| 8 | June 23, 2019 | 6.496% | 7.110% |
| 9 | June 29, 2019 | 5.767% | 6.408% |
| 10 | June 30, 2019 | 6.775% | 7.461% |
| 11 | July 6, 2019 | 6.258% | 7.131% |
| 12 | July 7, 2019 | 6.771% | 7.325% |
Part 3: The Prelude To All Legends (Note: Korean: 아스, 그 모든 전설의 서곡; RR: Aseu, geu modeun jeonseor-ui seogok)
| 13 | September 7, 2019 | 6.115% | 6.767% |
| 14 | September 8, 2019 | 7.200% | 8.068% |
| 15 | September 14, 2019 | 4.830% | 5.416% |
| 16 | September 15, 2019 | 6.924% | 7.440% |
| 17 | September 21, 2019 | 6.412% | 7.251% |
| 18 | September 22, 2019 | 7.373% | 7.581% |
| Average | | 6.550% | 7.180% |
| Special | May 26, 2019 | 2.290% | 2.804% |
In the table above, the blue numbers represent the lowest ratings and the red numbers represent the highest ratings.; This series aired on a cable channel/pay TV which normally has a relatively smaller audience compared to free-to-air TV/public broadcasters (KBS, SBS, MBC and EBS).

==== Season 2 ====
Average TV viewership ratings (season 2)
| Ep. | Original broadcast date | Average audience share (Nielsen Korea) | |
| Ep. | Original broadcast date | Nationwide | Seoul |
|---|---|---|---|
| 1 | September 9, 2023 | 4.969% (1st) | 5.363% (1st) |
| 2 | September 10, 2023 | 4.620% (1st) | 4.676% (1st) |
| 3 | September 16, 2023 | 5.004% (1st) | 5.617% (1st) |
| 4 | September 17, 2023 | 4.957% (1st) | 5.369% (1st) |
| 5 | September 23, 2023 (Note: Both episodes 5 and 6 were broadcast simultaneously on September 23 due to the broadcast of the men's football match between South Korea and Bahrain for the 19th Asian Games in Hangzhou on September 24.) | 3.456% (1st) | 3.637% (1st) |
| 6 | September 23, 2023 | 2.198% (4th) | 2.021% (3rd) |
| 7 | October 8, 2023 | 3.520% (1st) | 3.640% (2nd) |
| 8 | October 8, 2023 | 3.025% (3rd) | 3.256% (3rd) |
| 9 | October 14, 2023 | 3.172% (2nd) | 3.561% (2nd) |
| 10 | October 15, 2023 | 4.355% (2nd) | 4.544% (1st) |
| 11 | October 21, 2023 | 2.394% (1st) | 2.520% (2nd) |
| 12 | October 22, 2023 | 4.604% (1st) | 4.949% (1st) |
| Average | | 3.861% | 4.096% |
In the table above, the blue numbers represent the lowest ratings and the red numbers represent the highest ratings.; This series aired on a cable channel/pay TV which normally has a relatively smaller audience compared to free-to-air TV/public broadcasters (KBS, SBS, MBC and EBS).

=== Staff mistreatment ===
The production team was criticized for mistreatment of its production staff. In 2019 the production team was accused of violating labor laws from local civic groups, including the Seoul-based Hanbit Media Labor Rights Center and Hope Solidarity Labor Union, as the drama crew had been subject to a "murderous" working environment that made them work up to 150 hours a week. The organizations reported Studio Dragon to the Seoul Employment and Labor Administration. The standards were agreed upon and announced by the studio in September to enhance the labor environment of its staff.

Studio Dragon responded to the allegations, saying they abided by its own labor rules, but admitted that they had filmed for 113 hours during the week they went to Brunei in order to make the most out of their time shooting overseas. The studio denied reports that an injured staff member was ignored and told to continue working.

== Original soundtrack ==
=== Season 1 ===
==== Part 1 ====
Released on July 6, 2019
| No. | Title | Lyrics | Music | Artist | Length |
|---|---|---|---|---|---|
| 1. | "The Poem of Destiny (운명의 시)" | Seo Dong-sung | Park Sung-il | Ailee | 3:39 |
| 2. | "The Poem of Destiny (운명의 시)" (Inst.) | | Park Sung-il | | 3:39 |
| Total length: | | | | | 7:18 |

==== Part 2 ====
Released on September 22, 2019
| No. | Title | Lyrics | Music | Artist | Length |
|---|---|---|---|---|---|
| 1. | "Bloody Dreams (붉은 꿈)" | Seo Dong-sung | Park Sung-il | Hareem | 3:35 |
| 2. | "Bloody Dreams (붉은 꿈)" (Inst.) | | Park Sung-il | | 3:35 |
| Total length: | | | | | 7:10 |

==== Album OST ====
Released on October 22, 2019
| No. | Title | Artist | Length |
|---|---|---|---|
| 1. | "The Poem of Destiny" (운명의 시) | Ailee | 3:39 |
| 2. | "Bloody Dreams" (붉은 꿈) | Hareem | 3:35 |
| 3. | "Arthdal Chronicles" (아스달 연대기) | Kim Jun-suk | 1:09 |
| 4. | "Arth, The Prelude To All Legends" (아스, 그 모든 전설의 서곡) | Park Sung-il & Kim Sun-kyung | 4:40 |
| 5. | "Arthdal, The Eternal Dream!" (아스달, 그 영원한 꿈!) | Jeong Se-rin | 5:09 |
| 6. | "The Beginning Of A Legend" (전설의 시작) | Kim Joon-suk | 3:06 |
| 7. | "Tagon's Song" (타곤의 노래) | Park Sung-il | 2:43 |
| 8. | "But I Want You" (그래도 나는 너를 바란다) | Judah Earl | 3:04 |
| 9. | "An Unfinished Story" (끝나지 않은 이야기) | Kim Joon-suk | 3:46 |
| 10. | "A Strong Will" (굳센 의지) | Lee Yoon-ji | 3:44 |
| 11. | "An Unforgettable Name" (버릴 수 없는 이름) | Judah Earl | 3:47 |
| 12. | "War In The Silence" (고요 속의 전쟁) | Noh Yoo-rim | 3:53 |
| 13. | "Unexpected Intruder" (예상치 못한 침입자) | Joo In-ro | 2:21 |
| 14. | "I'll Go Save You" (널 구하러 갈게) | Shin Yoo-jin | 3:10 |
| 15. | "High Priest Niruha!" (대제관 니르하시여!) | Lee Roo-ri | 3:24 |
| 16. | "To Their Glorious Deaths" (빛나는 죽음을 위하여) | Park Sung-il | 3:23 |
| 17. | "Taealha" (태알하) | Goo Bon-choon | 1:35 |
| 18. | "Inverted Sky" (뒤집히는 하늘) | Kim Hyun-do | 3:41 |
| 19. | "The Chase Of Daekan" (대칸의 추격) | Judah Earl | 3:13 |
| 20. | "The Man Who Killed His Father" (아버지를 죽인 자) | Judah Earl | 3:03 |
| 21. | "You'll Kill Them All" (모두 죽이게 될 것이다) | Kim Hyun-do | 3:17 |
| 22. | "The Advance Of Tagon" (타곤의 진격) | Son Sung-rak | 2:43 |
| 23. | "The Edge Of The World" (세상의 끝) | Lee Roo-ri | 3:04 |
| 24. | "A Land Of Conflicting Desires" (욕망이 부딪치는 땅) | Greg Johnson | 3:57 |
| 25. | "Chaos Continues" (혼돈의 연속) | Kim Hyun-do | 5:19 |
| 26. | "A Chasing Sword" (조여오는 검) | Greg Johnson | 3:42 |
| 27. | "Alive God, Aramun Haesulla" (살아있는 신, 아라문해슬라) | Park Sung-il | 3:16 |
| 28. | "Eunseom And Saya" (은섬과 사야) | Lee Roo-ri | 3:11 |
| 29. | "People Fallen Into Grief" (눈물에 묶인 자들) | Jeong Se-rin | 2:42 |
| 30. | "The Great Black Cliff" (대흑벽) | Lee Yoon-ji | 3:07 |
| 31. | "To The Sea Of Momo" (모모의 바다로) | Kim Sun-kyung | 2:19 |
| 32. | "A Town In Ruins" (폐허가 된 마을) | Lee Yoon-ji | 2:44 |
| 33. | "A Lonely King" (외로운 왕) | Kim Joon-suk | 2:56 |
| 34. | "Fate Divided By Choice" (운명을 가른 선택) | Jeong Se-rin | 3:14 |
| 35. | "The Last Greeting Under Moonshine" (달빛 아래 마지막 인사) | Jeong Se-rin | 4:30 |
| 36. | "Unfocused" (어긋난 힘) | Noh Yoo-rim | 3:09 |
| 37. | "The Blue Nova And The Foretold Child" (푸른 객성, 그 예언의 아이) | Lee Roo-ri | 3:33 |
| 38. | "A Misfortune" (비운) | Lee Yoon-ji | 2:41 |
| 39. | "Sad Confession" (슬픈 고백) | Jeong Se-rin | 4:02 |
| 40. | "A Child In The Tower" (탑 속의 아이) | Park Sung-il | 3:26 |
| 41. | "Horrible Death" (참혹한 죽음) | Lee Yoon-ji | 2:41 |
| 42. | "The Story Goes On" (이야기는 이어진다) | Judah Earl | 3:01 |
| 43. | "The Three Of Us" (같은 날 태어난 우리 셋) | Lee Roo-ri | 4:39 |
| 44. | "Chaos" (혼돈의 연속) | Goo Bon-choon | 2:34 |
| 45. | "Hidden Story" (숨겨둔 이야기) | Lee Roo-ri | 2:26 |
| 46. | "The Confrontation Of Anger" (분노의 대립) | Noh Yoo-rim | 2:52 |
| 47. | "Capturing Race" (수 싸움) | Kim Jung-wan | 2:33 |
| 48. | "The Power To Protect" (지키려는 힘) | Goo Bon-choon | 2:49 |
| 49. | "Curse Of Death" (죽음의 저주) | Shin Yoo-jin | 2:42 |
| 50. | "Bloody Bracelet" (피 묻은 팔찌) | Lee Roo-ri | 3:13 |
| 51. | "Blood of Igutu" (이그트의 피) | Joo In-ro | 3:11 |
| 52. | "Crisis Of Arth" (아스의 위기) | Kim Hyun-do | 3:00 |
| 53. | "Sword Battle" (단칼의 승부) | Joo In-ro | 3:22 |
| 54. | "The Judgment Of The Waterfall" (폭포의 심판) | Kim Jung-wan | 2:18 |
| 55. | "Blood Oath" (피의 맹세) | Kim Hyun-do | 2:22 |
| 56. | "Pure Souls" (순백한 영혼들) | Seo Ye-rin | 1:34 |
| 57. | "The Xabara Of Momo" (모모의 샤바라) | Kim Hyun-do | 2:57 |
| 58. | "Second Coming Of Inaishingi" (이나이신기의 재림) | Shin Yoo-jin | 2:51 |
| 59. | "Conspiracy Of Asa Ron" (아사론의 음모) | Joo In-ro | 2:17 |
| 60. | "Rising Ground" (일어나는 땅) | Kim Hyun-do | 2:35 |
| 61. | "Blade Of Threat" (위협의 칼날) | Seo Ye-rin | 2:14 |
| 62. | "Beginning Of Tragedy" (비극의 시작) | Shin Yoo-jin | 2:30 |
| 63. | "Pursuit Of Blood" (피로 물든 추격) | Joo In-ro | 2:46 |
| Total length: | | | 3:16:24 |

=== Season 2 ===
==== Part 1 ====
Released on September 16, 2023
| No. | Title | Lyrics | Music | Artist | Length |
|---|---|---|---|---|---|
| 1. | "Chosen One" | Sean Kimm; Kapoo | Sean Kimm; Kapoo; M2U | Forestella | 4:10 |
| 2. | "Chosen One" (Inst.) | | Sean Kimm; Kapoo; M2U | | 4:10 |
| Total length: | | | | | 8:20 |

==== Part 2 ====
Released on September 30, 2023
| No. | Title | Lyrics | Music | Artist | Length |
|---|---|---|---|---|---|
| 1. | "Knock Down the Giants" | Oneway | Oneway; AllThou; Flora | twlv | 3:27 |
| 2. | "Knock Down the Giants" (Inst.) | | Oneway; AllThou; Flora | | 3:27 |
| Total length: | | | | | 7:54 |

==== Part 3 ====
Released on October 7, 2023
| No. | Title | Lyrics | Music | Artist | Length |
|---|---|---|---|---|---|
| 1. | "Untold" | Sean Kimm; Kapoo | Sean Kimm; Kapoo; M2U | Park Sun-ye | 3:49 |
| 2. | "Untold" (Inst.) | | Sean Kimm; Kapoo; M2U | | 3:49 |
| Total length: | | | | | 7:38 |

== Awards and nominations ==
| Year | Award | Category | Recipient | Result | Ref. |
|---|---|---|---|---|---|
| 2018 | Korea First Brand Awards | Most Anticipated Drama of 2019 | Arthdal Chronicles | Won | |
| 2019 | 12th Korea Drama Awards | Excellence Award, Actress | Kim Ji-won | Nominated | |
| 2019 | Asia Artist Awards | Actor of the Year (Daesang) | Jang Dong-gun | Won | |
| 2019 | 9th Korean Wave Awards | Cultural Tourism Grand Prize | Osan | Won | |
