= Kim Young-hyun =

South Korean screenwriter

- Born: 1966 (age 59–60); South Korea
- Education: Yonsei University - Economics
- Occupation: Screenwriter
- Agent(s): KPJ Corporation (a subsidiary of Studio Dragon)

Kim Young-hyun (born c. 1966) is a South Korean television screenwriter. She is best known for writing the hit dramas Dae Jang Geum and Queen Seondeok.

== Filmography ==
=== As screenwriter ===
- Dae Jang Geum (2003)
- Ballad of Seodong (2005)
- H.I.T (2007)
- Queen Seondeok (2009)
- Royal Family (2011)
- Deep Rooted Tree (2011)
- Six Flying Dragons (2015)
- Arthdal Chronicles (2019)

=== As producer ===
- Circle (2017)

== Awards ==
| Year | Award | Category | Nominated work | Result | Ref. |
|---|---|---|---|---|---|
| 2003 | MBC Drama Awards | Writer of the Year | Dae Jang Geum | Won | |
| 2009 | MBC Drama Awards | Writer of the Year | Queen Seondeok | Won | |
| 2010 | 5th Seoul International Drama Awards | Outstanding Korean Screenwriter | Queen Seondeok | Won | |
| 2010 | Korea Producers & Directors' (PD) Awards | TV Writer Award | Queen Seondeok | Won | |
| 2012 | 48th Baeksang Arts Awards | Best Screenplay | Deep Rooted Tree | Won | |
| 2016 | 52nd Baeksang Arts Awards | Best Screenplay | Six Flying Dragons | Nominated | |
