= Deep Rooted Tree =

2011 South Korean historical television series

- Promotional poster
- Also known as: Tree with Deep Roots
- Hangul: 뿌리 깊은 나무
- RR: Ppuri gipeun namu
- MR: Ppuri kip'ŭn namu
- Genre: Historical; Mystery; Romance
- Created by: Koo Bon Geun (SBS Drama Headquarters)
- Based on: Deep Rooted Tree by Lee Jung-myung
- Written by: Kim Young-hyun; Park Sang-yeon
- Directed by: Jang Tae-yoo
- Starring: Han Suk-kyu; Jang Hyuk; Shin Se-kyung
- Composer: Jeon Changyeop
- Country of origin: South Korea
- Original language: Korean
- No. of episodes: 24

Production
- Executive producer: Choi Moon Seok (SBS Drama Operation Team)
- Producers: Kyung Min seok Lee Young jun Jung Hoon-tak; Jang Jin-wook
- Production location: Korea
- Running time: Wednesdays and Thursdays at 21:55 (KST)
- Production company: iHQ

Original release
- Network: SBS
- Release: 5 October – 22 December 2011

Related
- Six Flying Dragons

Deep Rooted Tree (Korean: 뿌리 깊은 나무; RR: Ppuri gipeun namu) is a 2011 South Korean television series starring Han Suk-kyu, Jang Hyuk and Shin Se-kyung. Based on the novel of the same name by Lee Jung-myung, it aired on SBS from 5 October to 22 December 2011 on Wednesdays and Thursdays at 21:55 for 24 episodes.

Taking its name from the poem Yongbieocheonga that says that trees with deep roots do not sway, the series tells the story of a royal guard (played by Jang Hyuk) investigating a case involving the serial murders of Jiphyeonjeon scholars in Gyeongbokgung while King Sejong (played by Han Suk-kyu, in his TV comeback after 16 years of solely film work) comes to create the Korean alphabet.

== Synopsis ==
Early in his reign, King Sejong inevitably causes the death of his in-laws and their slaves in an attempt to save them from his brutal father, King Taejong, mainly due to his lack of authority and power. Two young slaves, Ddol-bok and his friend Dam, survive but neither knows if the other has. Ddol-bok blames the king and vows to kill him to avenge the deaths of everyone he loved and spends years becoming a great warrior. Dam, who has a photographic memory, becomes a court lady called So-yi (Shin Se-kyung), but she feels so guilty about her role in the other slaves' deaths that she becomes mute.

Ddol-bok returns to the palace under the name of Kang Chae-yoon (Jang Hyuk) to kill the king. However, during his time there, he becomes embroiled in the mystery surrounding the deaths of several Hall of Worthies scholars. The deaths were caused by a secret society called "Hidden Root," which was created long ago by followers of Jeong Do-jeon, with the goal of giving more power to ministers and less to the king. King Taejong killed Jeong Do-jeon and all of his family except his nephew, Jeong Gi-joon, who is now the leader of Hidden Root and lives in disguise not far from King Sejong.

It soon becomes known that the king, with the help of So-yi and the Hall of Worthies scholars, has been working for years on a secret project, which turns out to be the creation of the Korean alphabet. While tracking Hidden Root, Kang Chae-yoon and So-yi each realizes who the other really is - Ddol-bok and Dam. Realizing that each other are the ones who they were dying to find, So-yi begins to speak. So-yi shows Chae-yoon the alphabet and describes how it will give more power to commoners. Chae-yoon is amazed with the simplicity of the alphabet and is convinced to work with the king instead of killing him.

However, Jeong Gi-joon believes that the new alphabet is a threat to Confucian order, and decides to stop it at all costs. He murders the king's son, but this only makes Sejong more determined. Jeong is able to stop the king's dissemination efforts, and on the day the alphabet is to be publicly announced, both So-yi and Chae-yoon are fatally wounded by Hidden Root members. However, through their sacrifices, the event is successful, and commoners begin to use Hangul.

== Cast ==
=== Main ===
- Han Suk-kyu as King Sejong
  - Song Joong-ki as teen Yi Do
  - Kang San as child Yi Do

The creator of Hangul. During his early years as king, Yi Do had a strained relationship with his father and harbored guilt for seeing people's suffering and death (including his wife's family) under his father's tyrannical rule. After the death of his father and his wife Soheon, Yi Do (now called King Sejong) employs Kang Chae-yoon as an investigator (unaware he is the same boy whom he spared years before) and is helped by So-yi in the creation of Hangul. He later finds out that Chae-yoon is the same boy who tried to kill him.

- Jang Hyuk as Kang Chae-yoon/Ddol-bok
  - Yeo Jin-goo as teen Ddol-bok
  - Chae Sang-woo as child Ddol-bok

A former slave who has become royal guard and investigator for King Sejong. As a child, Ddol-bok protected his intellectually disabled father from the teasing of other servants of the Queen's family. Later, Ddol-bok 's father was arrested and beaten, finally dying in front of him and his childhood friend So-yi. Though he was actually saved by King Sejong, he doesn't know it, and because he blames Sejong for his father's death, has sworn to avenge him by killing the king. He becomes a soldier under a changed name, and also trains under a martial arts master named Lee Bang-Ji, who showed him the way of the leaping martial arts that shows incredible speed, agility, power and stamina. Chae-yoon later becomes a low-level guard along with his friends, because he wants to keep a low profile from the king. He doesn't know that So-yi is Dam, believing that she is dead.

- Shin Se-kyung as So-yi/Dam
  - Kim Hyun-soo as young Dam

Chae-yoon's friend who was saved as a child by Sejong's wife and became a court lady. During her early years as court lady, Yi Do apologized to her for his role in her family's death. She feels so guilty about her role in her fellow slaves' deaths that she cannot speak, but she is useful in the creation of Hangul because of her photographic memory.

=== Supporting ===
- Jeon No-min as Jeong Do-kwang

"Sambong" Jeong Do-jeon's brother

- Yoon Je-moon as Jeong Gi-joon/Ga Ri-on
  - Choi Woo-shik as young Jeong Gi-joon/Ga Ri-on
- Ahn Suk-hwan as Lee Shin-juk
- Lee Jae-yong as Jo Mal-saeng
- Kwon Tae-won as Choe Manri
- Jeon Seung-hwan as Hwang Hui
- Cho Jin-woong as Moo-hyul

Sejong's bodyguard and friend who would sacrifice himself to protect his friend.

- Park Hyuk-kwon as Jeong In-ji
- Jang Ji-eun as Queen Soheon
- Kim Ki-bang as Cho-tak
- Shin Seung-hwan as Park Po
- Song Ok-sook as Do Dam-daek
- Han Sang-jin as Shim Jong-soo
- Seo Jun-young as Prince Gwangpyeong
- Lee Soo-hyuk as Yoon Pyeong
  - Baek Su-ho as young Pyeong

An assassin who was smitten by So-yi when he took her hostage.

- Kim Ki-bum as Pak Paengnyeon
- Hyun Woo as Seong Sam-mun
- Jo Hee-bong as Han Myung-hoi/Han Ga-nom
- Jung Da-bin as Yeon-doo
- Jeon Young-bin as Mak-soo
- Woo Hyun as Lee Bang-ji
- Yoo Hyun-soo as Lee Soon-ji
- Shin So-yul as Mok-ya
- Shim So-heon as Deok-geum
- Baek Yoon-sik as King Taejong/Yi Bangwon (cameo)
- Han In-soo as Sim On (cameo)
- Choi Il-hwa as Kim Jongseo
- Heo Joon-seok as Kkeut-soo
- Ryu Seung-soo as Jang Sung-soo
- Baek Seo-bin as Jang Eun-sung
- Min Ji-young as Yeon-doo's mother
- Lee Se-na as Geun-ji
- Choi Jung-woo as Park Eun
- Jung Yoo-chan as Heo Dam
- Jung Joon-won as child with bone cancer
- Kim Sung-hyun as Kareupeyi Temukan (Alias: Gae Pa-yi)

Though his origins are vague, the drama refers him to be from the Yuan Dynasty (Modern China, Russia and Mongolia). He is a master assassin who belonged to the mercenary group called the Gokturks. It is said no one can fight him and win that's why he is also called the invincible man. His skills exceed those of Kang Chae-yoon, Moo-hyul and Yoon Pyeong. The only one that is equally matched to him is Lee Bang-ji, whom he kills.

== Ratings ==
Episode #	Original broadcast date	Average audience share			
Episode #	Original broadcast date	TNmS Ratings		AGB Nielsen	
Episode #	Original broadcast date	Nationwide	Seoul National Capital Area	Nationwide	Seoul National Capital Area
1	5 October 2011	9.2%	11.0%	9.5%	11.1%
2	6 October 2011	8.2%	9.8%	9.8%	10.6%
3	12 October 2011	16.4%	18.7%	18.2%	20.7%
4	13 October 2011	18.8%	22.6%	19.1%	21.8%
5	19 October 2011	17.7%	20.6%	18.3%	20.5%
6	20 October 2011	18.3%	20.8%	18.6%	19.1%
7	26 October 2011	17.9%	21.0%	18.9%	20.1%
8	27 October 2011	18.3%	20.5%	19.2%	20.5%
9	2 November 2011	17.3%	19.2%	17.4%	18.9%
10	3 November 2011	18.5%	20.7%	20.2%	22.1%
11	9 November 2011	17.9%	20.3%	19.1%	20.4%
12	10 November 2011	18.9%	20.9%	19.9%	21.3%
13	16 November 2011	18.7%	21.4%	19.4%	20.9%
14	17 November 2011	19.0%	21.6%	20.5%	22.0%
15	23 November 2011	17.8%	20.6%	20.1%	21.1%
16	24 November 2011	19.9%	21.9%	21.1%	22.3%
17	30 November 2011	18.8%	20.7%	21.0%	22.0%
18	1 December 2011	18.6%	21.4%	20.8%	22.2%
19	7 December 2011	20.1%	23.1%	21.6%	23.0%
20	8 December 2011	20.2%	23.5%	21.7%	23.0%
21	14 December 2011	19.7%	22.3%	21.9%	23.3%
22	15 December 2011	19.3%	22.1%	22.7%	24.7%
23	21 December 2011	19.7%	22.5%	21.4%	23.2%
24	22 December 2011	23.6%	27.5%	25.4%	27.3%
Average		18.0%	20.6%	19.4%	20.9%

Source: AGB Nielsen Korea

== Awards and nominations ==
Year	Award	Category	Recipient	Result
2011	SBS Drama Awards	Grand Prize (Daesang)	Han Suk-kyu	Won
2011	SBS Drama Awards	Best Drama	Deep Rooted Tree	Won
2011	SBS Drama Awards	Top Excellence Award, Actor in a Drama Special	Han Suk-kyu	Nominated
2011	SBS Drama Awards	Excellence Award, Actress in a Drama Special	Shin Se-kyung	Won
2011	SBS Drama Awards	Special Award, Actor in a Drama Special	Cho Jin-woong	Nominated
2011	SBS Drama Awards	Special Award, Actress in a Drama Special	Song Ok-sook	Won
2011	SBS Drama Awards	Producer's Choice Award	Song Joong-ki	Won
2011	SBS Drama Awards	Top 10 Stars	Han Suk-kyu	Won
2011	SBS Drama Awards	Top 10 Stars	Jang Hyuk	Won
2012	6th Mnet 20's Choice Awards	20's Male Drama Star	Song Joong-ki	Nominated
2012	6th Mnet 20's Choice Awards	20's Female Drama Star	Shin Se-kyung	Nominated
2012	7th Seoul International Drama Awards	Grand Prize	Deep Rooted Tree	Won
2012	7th Seoul International Drama Awards	Best Screenwriter	Kim Young-hyun, Park Sang-yeon	Nominated
2012	7th Seoul International Drama Awards	Outstanding Korean Drama	Deep Rooted Tree	Nominated
2012	7th Seoul International Drama Awards	Outstanding Korean Actress	Shin Se-kyung	Nominated
2012	48th Baeksang Arts Awards	Grand Prize (Daesang) for TV	Deep Rooted Tree	Won
2012	48th Baeksang Arts Awards	Best TV Drama	Deep Rooted Tree	Nominated
2012	48th Baeksang Arts Awards	Best Actor (TV)	Han Suk-kyu	Nominated
2012	48th Baeksang Arts Awards	Best Director (TV)	Jang Tae-yoo	Nominated
2012	48th Baeksang Arts Awards	Best Screenplay (TV)	Kim Young-hyun, Park Sang-yeon	Won
2012	5th Korea Drama Awards	Grand Prize (Daesang)	Han Suk-kyu	Nominated
2012	5th Korea Drama Awards	Best Director	Jang Tae-yoo	Won
2012	5th Korea Drama Awards	Excellence Award, Actor	Yoon Je-moon	Nominated
2012	1st K-Drama Star Awards	Top Excellence Award, Actor	Han Suk-kyu	Nominated

== International broadcast ==
It aired in Japan on KNTV from 24 July to 17 September 2012, which was followed by reruns on terrestrial network TV Tokyo.

It aired in Thailand on Channel 7 every Monday to Thursday at 2.10 a.m. starting 14 January 2016.

It aired in Indonesia on RTV ever Monday to Friday at 7:30 a.m. starring 6 May 2016.
