= Black Knight: The Man Who Guards Me =

South Korean television series

- Promotional poster
- Hangul: 흑기사
- Lit.: Black Knight
- RR: Heukgisa
- MR: Hŭkkisa
- Genre: Fantasy; Romance; Melodrama
- Created by: KBS Drama Production
- Written by: Kim In-yeong
- Directed by: Han Sang-woo
- Starring: Kim Rae-won; Shin Se-kyung; Seo Ji-hye; Chang Mi-hee
- Composers: Kenzie; Lee Na-il
- Country of origin: South Korea
- Original language: Korean
- No. of episodes: 20

Production
- Executive producers: Jung Chang-hwan; Kang Byung-taek
- Producer: Choi Joon-ho
- Production locations: Ljubljana, Slovenia; Seoul, South Korea
- Camera setup: Single-camera
- Running time: 60 mins
- Production company: n.CH Entertainment

Original release
- Network: KBS2
- Release: December 6, 2017 – February 8, 2018

Black Knight: The Man Who Guards Me (Korean: 흑기사) is a South Korean television series starring Kim Rae-won in title role alongside Shin Se-kyung, Seo Ji-hye, and Chang Mi-hee. It aired on KBS2 starting December 6, 2017 every Wednesday and Thursday at 22:00 (KST) for 20 episodes.

== Synopsis ==
This drama is about a pure man who accepts a dangerous destiny for the woman he loves. It is a love story that spans over two hundred years. Moon Soo-ho (Kim Rae-won) is a businessman with a pure heart who braves danger for his love Jung Hae-ra (Shin Se-kyung), who is a travel agent but never traveled abroad.

== Cast ==
=== Main ===
- Kim Rae-won as Moon Soo-ho / Lee Myung-so (Black Knight)
  - Sung Yoo-bin as young Moon Soo-ho / young Lee Myung-so

He is a successful CEO who is strict to himself, and he never shows his true colors. But when he is in love, he is a pure romanticist. After the death of his parents, a friend of his father became his guardian and looked after him. He and his guardian's daughter grew up like siblings, and he slowly developed feelings for her. However, the joy did not last long. He felt betrayed and hurt by his guardian and his daughter. When he is on the verge of breaking down from despair, a delivery woman tells him that a big fortune is waiting for him in the future. Her words become a prophecy and he keeps on rolling. The endless luck scares him because he worries that he might have to repay all of it later. Then, he meets the guardian's daughter again. She makes his heart flutter even though she hurt him. She is his first love.

- Shin Se-kyung as Jung Hae-ra / Boon-yi
  - Park Ga-ram as young Jung Hae-ra / young Boon-yi

She works for a travel agency. Even though she is poor, she takes care of her aunt and maintains a cheerful attitude. As a child she was pretty well-off. However, when her parents died and her family went bankrupt, her life turned upside down. She did not lose hope because she had a job, a house, and a boyfriend. But misfortunes never come alone. Her work, family and lover drag her to the pit of her life. Then she remembers the wine-colored coat she had ordered at Sharon's Boutique as a child. She never got to pick it up because her family suddenly went bankrupt. Could her life have changed if she had picked up that coat? After she unexpectedly finds the coat, strange things start to happen to her. Then she meets him, the man who calls himself her black knight.

- Seo Ji-hye as Sharon / Choi Seo-rin
  - Lee Ji-eun as young Choi Seo-rin

She is the designer at Sharon's Boutique. Although she attracts much attention with her beauty, her personality is selfish, cranky, and egocentric like a child. She keeps a huge secret. She has been living for more than 200 years without getting old or dying. Ever since 'that day', she has been spending lonely days without aging. She is receiving punishment for the sin she committed 200 years ago, but she is so stricken with a victim mentality that she never grows or finds enlightenment. When Hae-ra visits her boutique to find the coat she had ordered as a child, she tries to escape from karma by being generous to Hae-ra. She desperately wants to break away from the endless punishment. But at that moment, she meets him again. The man she has been missing for hundreds of years. The man she believes to be her destiny.

- Chang Mi-hee as Becky / Jang Baek-hee

She is a perfumer and cultural heritage commentator of Seochon. A mysterious aura surrounds her entire body. Her other job is a power blogger. She lived for 250 years and writes interesting stories on her blog. No one knows that those stories are her actual experiences. She hopes to break away from the punishment and become mortal again. Then she meets the lovers who are tangled up by a terribly cruel fate. They marked the beginning of her karma.

=== Supporting ===
==== People around Hae-ra ====
- Hwang Jung-min as Lee Sook-hee
- Shin So-yul as Kim Young-mi
- Park Sung-hoon as Park Gon
- Kim Byeong-ok as Park Chul-min
- Kim Hyun-joon as Choi Ji-hoon

==== People at Soo-ho's company ====
- Jung Jin as Soo-ho's secretary

==== People at Hae-ra's Travel Agency ====
- Han Ji-sun as Kang Joo-hee
- Kim Gyeol as Head Manager
- Cha Chung-hwa as Team leader

==== People at Sharon's Boutique ====
- Kim Seol-jin as Yang Seung-goo

=== Others ===
- Yeom Dong-heon as Manager Cho
- Song Sam-dong as Jeom Bok
  - Jo Hyun-do as young Jeom Bok
- Lim Yong-sun as Guard
- Lee Seung-hyung as Hae-ra's father

=== Special appearance ===
- Kim Jung-nam

== Production ==
- The series was written by Kim In-young and directed by Han Sang-woo, who have previously worked together on Unkind Ladies (2015).
- The first script reading was held on October 8, 2017.
- The series was the first television production of n.CH Entertainment, a new company set up by former S.M. C&C CEO Jung Chang-hwan.

== Original soundtrack ==
Black Knight: The Man Who Guards Me OST

Soundtrack album by Various artists
- Released: January 24, 2018
- Recorded: 2017
- Genre: Soundtrack
- Language: Korean
- Labels: Leon Korea; Warner Music

=== Part 1 ===
No.	Title	Lyrics	Music	Artist	Length
1.	"I Hope It's Me" (나이기를)	Yu Yoo-jin, Maktub, Lee Ra-eun	Maktub, Lee Ra-eun	Maktub, Seo Young-eun	03:17
2.	"I Hope It's Me" (Inst.)		Maktub, Lee Ra-eun		03:17
Total length:					06:34

=== Part 2 ===
No.	Title	Lyrics	Music	Artist	Length
1.	"Daydream" (백일몽)	Kenzie, Lee Na-il	Kenzie, Lee Na-il	Kwon Sun-il (Urban Zakapa)	03:17
2.	"Daydream" (Inst.)		Kenzie, Lee Na-il		03:17
Total length:					06:34

=== Part 3 ===
No.	Title	Lyrics	Music	Artist	Length
1.	"Spring Watch" (태엽시계)	Kenzie, Lee Na-il	Kenzie, Lee Na-il	Hyolyn	03:26
2.	"Spring Watch" (Inst.)		Kenzie, Lee Na-il		03:26
Total length:					06:52

=== Part 4 ===
No.	Title	Lyrics	Music	Artist	Length
1.	"Goodbye Kiss/Flower Rain" (꽃비)	Lee Shin-sung	ZigZag Note, No Eun-jong	Paul Kim	03:58
2.	"Goodbye Kiss/Flower Rain" (Inst.)		ZigZag Note, No Eun-jong		03:58
Total length:					07:56

=== Part 5 ===
No.	Title	Lyrics	Music	Artist	Length
1.	"With You"	Yu Yoo-jin	Lance Dale Gehl, Alby Lee Odum	GB9	03:26
2.	"With You" (Inst.)		Lance Dale Gehl, Alby Lee Odum		03:26
Total length:					06:52

=== Part 6 ===
No.	Title	Lyrics	Music	Artist	Length
1.	"Closer"	Bull$EyE, iLLA	Bull$EyE, Lee Jae-min	Lee Raon, Lim Ji-young	03:02
2.	"Closer" (Inst.)		Bull$EyE, Lee Jae-min		03:02
Total length:					06:04

=== Part 7 ===
No.	Title	Lyrics	Music	Artist	Length
1.	"Would You"	Mun Sully, Seo Jung-ah	Sophia Pae, BUM, Distract	Lee Bada, NiiHWA	03:41
2.	"Would You" (Inst.)		Sophia Pae, BUM, Distract		03:41
Total length:					07:22

== Ratings ==
- In this table, The blue numbers represent the lowest ratings and the red numbers represent the highest ratings.

Ep.	Original broadcast Date	Average audience share			
Ep.	Original broadcast Date	TNmS Ratings		AGB Nielsen Ratings	
Ep.	Original broadcast Date	Nationwide	Seoul	Nationwide	Seoul
1	December 6, 2017	8.0% (15th)	8.0% (10th)	6.9% (15th)	7.0% (15th)
2	December 7, 2017	8.1% (15th)	8.0% (12th)	9.3% (7th)	9.8% (5th)
3	December 13, 2017	8.8% (13th)	9.8% (5th)	7.9% (11th)	7.9% (11th)
4	December 14, 2017	9.8% (10th)	10.4% (5th)	9.1% (7th)	8.9% (7th)
5	December 20, 2017	10.6% (7th)	10.5% (4th)	10.4% (6th)	10.6% (4th)
6	December 21, 2017	10.9% (6th)	11.4% (4th)	11.1% (4th)	11.5% (4th)
7	December 27, 2017	10.9% (10th)	10.7% (4th)	11.6% (4th)	12.0% (4th)
8	December 28, 2017	13.0% (4th)	13.0% (3rd)	13.2% (4th)	12.8% (4th)
9	January 3, 2018	10.0% (9th)	9.3% (5th)	9.2% (10th)	8.7% (8th)
10	January 4, 2018	10.3% (10th)	10.9%	10.6% (6th)	11.2% (4th)
11	January 10, 2018	9.4% (9th)	9.7%	9.8% (9th)	10.2% (5th)
12	January 11, 2018	9.5% (11th)	9.6%	9.9% (10th)	9.9% (6th)
13	January 17, 2018	8.8% (8th)	9.6%	7.9% (10th)	7.1% (15th)
14	January 18, 2018	8.7% (11th)	9.1%	8.3% (10th)	7.9% (10th)
15	January 24, 2018	8.2% (15th)	8.3%	8.7% (11th)	8.7% (10th)
16	January 25, 2018	9.3% (14th)	9.4%	8.6% (12th)	8.5% (10th)
17	January 31, 2018	11.1% (9th)	11.3%	9.1% (10th)	8.9% (11th)
18	February 1, 2018	11.0% (11th)	11.4%	9.5% (11th)	9.1% (10th)
19	February 7, 2018	9.6% (14th)	9.8%	8.7% (12th)	8.7% (12th)
20	February 8, 2018	12.9% (6th)	13.2%	13.9% (4th)	14.3% (2nd)
Average		9.9%	10.2%	9.7%	9.7%

== Awards and nominations ==
Year	Award	Category	Recipient	Result	Ref.
2018	11th Korea Drama Awards	Excellence Award, Actress	Shin Se-kyung	Nominated	
2018	2018 KBS Drama Awards	Top Excellence Award, Actor	Kim Rae-won	Nominated	
2018	2018 KBS Drama Awards	Top Excellence Award, Actress	Chang Mi-hee	Won	
2018	2018 KBS Drama Awards	Top Excellence Award, Actress	Shin Se-kyung	Nominated	
2018	2018 KBS Drama Awards	Excellence Award, Actor in a Mid-length Drama	Kim Rae-won	Nominated	
2018	2018 KBS Drama Awards	Excellence Award, Actress in a Mid-length Drama	Shin Se-kyung	Nominated	
2018	2018 KBS Drama Awards	Excellence Award, Actress in a Mid-length Drama	Seo Ji-hye	Nominated	
2018	2018 KBS Drama Awards	Best New Actor	Park Sung-hoon	Won	
2018	2018 KBS Drama Awards	Best Young Actor	Sung Yu-bin	Nominated	
2018	2018 KBS Drama Awards	Best Young Actress	Park Ga-ram	Nominated	
