= Captivating the King =

2024 South Korean television series

- Promotional poster
- Also known as: Sejak
- Hangul: 세작, 매혹된 자들
- Hanja: 細作, 魅惑된 子들
- Lit.: Spy, the Fascinated
- RR: Sejak, maehokdoen jadeul
- MR: Sejak, maehoktoen chadŭl
- Genre: Period drama; Romance; Melodrama
- Developed by: Studio Dragon (planning)
- Written by: Kim Seon-deok
- Directed by: Cho Nam-guk
- Starring: Jo Jung-suk; Shin Se-kyung; Lee Shin-young
- Music by: Park Se-joon
- Country of origin: South Korea
- Original language: Korean
- No. of episodes: 16

Production
- Executive producers: Kwon Byung-wook; Kim Seok-won; Cho So-yeon
- Producers: Park Chang-joo; Kim Na-kyung; Kang Ha-yeon
- Cinematography: Kim Seung-ho; Joo Sung-min; Cha Young-hu
- Editors: Oh Sang-hwan; Bang Soo-yeon
- Running time: 70 minutes
- Production company: C-JeS Studios

Original release
- Network: tvN
- Release: January 21 – March 3, 2024

Captivating the King (Korean: 세작, 매혹된 자들) is a 2024 South Korean television series starring Jo Jung-suk, Shin Se-kyung, and Lee Shin-young. It aired on tvN from January 21, to March 3, 2024, every Saturday and Sunday at 21:20 (KST). It is also available for streaming on TVING in South Korea, and on Netflix in selected regions.

== Synopsis ==
The series depicts the cruel love story of Yi In (Jo Jung-suk), a miserable king who has no one around him that he can trust and is in danger of both royal and political power struggles, and Kang Hee-soo (Shin Se-kyung), who tries to deceive him for revenge but ends up falling in love with him.

== Cast and characters ==
=== Main ===
- Jo Jung-suk as Yi In / Grand Prince Jinhan

King of Joseon who is a baduk genius.

- Shin Se-kyung as Kang Hee-soo / Kang Mong-woo
1. Kang Hee-soo

A woman who disguises herself as a man and becomes a spy to take revenge.

1. Kang Mong-woo: a genius baduk player who later becomes Yi In's close friend.
- Lee Shin-young as Kim Myung-ha

A nobleman who is good at both archery and swordsmanship.

=== Supporting ===
==== Important characters ====
- Choi Dae-hoon as Yi Seon

Yi In's older brother.

- Lee Gyu-hoe as Park Jong-hwan

Royal Queen Dowager Park's older brother.

- Yang Kyung-won as Yoo Hyun-bo

an assistant section chief of the Ministry of Rites who will do anything for the sake of wealth and fame.

- Jo Sung-ha as Kim Jong-bae

Kim Myung-ha's father who is the minister of military affairs.

- Son Hyun-joo as Kang Hang-sun

Kang Hee-soo's father and Yi In's teacher who is the Chief State Councillor.

==== Yi In's people ====
- Kang Hong-seok as Joo Sang-hwa

Yi In's royal guard.

- Park Ye-young as Court Lady Dong

Yi In's lady-in-waiting who is surrounded by secrets.

- TBA as Ji Nam-gyu

A physician at naeuiwon.

- Kim Ki-nam as Eunuch Kim

==== Kang Hee-soo's people ====
- Na Hyun-woo as Chu Dal-ha

Kang Hee-soo's assistant who is a former military officer.

- Song Sang-eun as Ja Geun-nyeon

Kang Hee-soo's friend and servant.

- Han Dong-hee as Hong-jang

Kang Hee-soo's friend and Yoo Hyun-bo's sister who is a courtesan.

- Jung Seok-yong as Se-dong

A spy who has pure and upright personality.

- Go Soo-hee as Jeom Yi-ne

Se-dong's wife who is a spy.

- Kim Bo-yoon as Bun-young

An assistant court lady and a spy.

- Lee Yoon-hee as Kim Je-nam

Kang Hang-sun's old friend who is a former high-ranking local government official.

==== Royal family ====
- Jang Young-nam as Royal Queen Dowager Park

Yi In's biological mother.

- Ahn Se-eun as Royal Princess Jangryeong

Eldest daughter of the late king Yi Seon and Yi In's niece.

- Hong Jun-woo as Grand Prince Moonseong

son of the late king Yi Seon and Yi In's nephew.

- Ha Seo-yoon as Queen Oh

Yi In's wife.

- Jeon Su-ji as Court Lady Han

Royal Queen Dowager Park's lady-in-waiting.

==== Members of the court ====
- Um Hyo-sup as Oh Wook-hwan

Queen Oh's father.

- Baek Seok-gwang as Min Ji-hwan

Park Jong-hwan's right-hand man.

- Kim Seo-ha as Min Sang-hyo

Kim Myung-ha's friend and Min Ji-hwan's younger brother.

- Jo Jae-ryong as Jung Je-pyo

A Qing Dynasty official who serves as an interpreter.

=== Extended ===
- Ahn Si-ha as Queen Kim

Yi Seon's wife.

=== Special appearance ===
- Song Ji-woo as a courtesan

== Production ==
Filming of the series began in March 2023.

== Original soundtrack ==
=== Part 1 ===
Released on January 21, 2024
No.	Title	Lyrics	Music	Artist	Length
1.	"Daydreaming" (꿈이라도 좋을 꿈)	Kinsha	AllThou; Kim Su-hyun; Park Hyun-seo; Flora; Oneway	Shin Ji-hoon	3:19
2.	"Daydreaming" (꿈이라도 좋을 꿈; Inst.)		AllThou; Kim Su-hyun; Park Hyun-seo; Flora; Oneway		3:19
Total length:					6:38

=== Part 2 ===
Released on January 28, 2024
No.	Title	Lyrics	Music	Artist	Length
1.	"Drizzle" (가랑비(濛雨))	Lee Ga-yoon; Park Seung-ju	Park Seung-ju; SteroeHz; Lee Ga-yoon	Kwon Jin-ah	4:00
2.	"Drizzle" (가랑비(濛雨); Inst.)		Park Seung-ju; SteroeHz; Lee Ga-yoon		4:00
Total length:					8:00

=== Part 3 ===
Released on February 4, 2024
No.	Title	Lyrics	Music	Artist	Length
1.	"Wave" (파랑(波浪))	Kapoo; Sean Kimm	M2U; Kapoo; Sean Kimm	Taeil (NCT)	3:34
2.	"Wave" (파랑(波浪); Inst.)		M2U; Kapoo; Sean Kimm		3:34
Total length:					7:08

=== Part 4 ===
Released on February 18, 2024
No.	Title	Lyrics	Music	Artist	Length
1.	"Peach Tree" (그대라는 꽃잎)	Dinner Coat	Dinner Coat; Yu Jeong-hyeon	Roy Kim	3:44
2.	"Peach Tree" (그대라는 꽃잎; Inst.)		Dinner Coat; Yu Jeong-hyeon		3:44
Total length:					7:28

== Viewership ==
Captivating the King : South Korea viewers per episode (millions)

Season	Episode number															
Season	1	2	3	4	5	6	7	8	9	10	11	12	13	14	15	16
1	0.976	0.641	0.704	1.284	N/A	1.212	0.903	1.120	1.623	1.661	0.982	1.321	1.099	1.497	1.213	1.810

Source: Audience measurement performed nationwide by Nielsen Korea.

Average TV viewership ratings
Ep.	Original broadcast date	Average audience share (Nielsen Korea)	
Ep.	Original broadcast date	Nationwide	Seoul
1	January 21, 2024	3.977% (2nd)	4.077% (2nd)
2	January 21, 2024	3.089% (3rd)	3.224% (3rd)
3	January 27, 2024	3.286% (1st)	3.550% (1st)
4	January 28, 2024	6.016% (1st)	5.968% (2nd)
5	February 3, 2024	3.868% (4th)	N/A
6	February 4, 2024	5.461% (1st)	5.350% (1st)
7	February 9, 2024	4.162% (1st)	4.573% (1st)
8	February 10, 2024	4.733% (1st)	4.863% (1st)
9	February 11, 2024	6.369% (2nd)	6.290% (2nd)
10	February 11, 2024	6.703% (1st)	6.792% (1st)
11	February 17, 2024	4.100% (1st)	4.240% (1st)
12	February 18, 2024	5.938% (1st)	5.837% (2nd)
13	February 24, 2024	4.942% (1st)	5.272% (1st)
14	February 25, 2024	6.675% (1st)	7.082% (1st)
15	March 2, 2024	5.609% (1st)	6.030% (1st)
16	March 3, 2024	7.763% (1st)	7.915% (1st)
Average		5.609%	— (Note: Due to multiple unpublished ratings, the exact average rating is unknown.)
In the table above, the blue numbers represent the lowest ratings and the red numbers represent the highest ratings.; This series aired on a cable channel/pay TV which normally has a relatively smaller audience compared to free-to-air TV/public broadcasters (KBS, SBS, MBC, and EBS).
