= Shin Seung-hwan =

South Korean actor (born 1978)

- Born: December 12, 1978 (age 47); Seo-gu, Busan, South Korea
- Education: Seoul Institute of the Arts – Broadcasting Entertainment
- Occupation: Actor
- Years active: 2000–present
- Agent: STARIT Entertainment
- Spouse: Unknown (m. 2010)

Korean name
- Hangul: 신승환
- RR: Sin Seunghwan
- MR: Sin Sŭnghwan

Shin Seung-hwan is a South Korean actor.

== Filmography ==
=== Film ===
Year	Title	Role/Notes
2001	Kick the Moon	Ttukkeong chief
2002	Lovers' Concerto	Min-sik
2003	Crazy First Love	Geum-dong
2004	Two Guys	Soo-heon
2009	The Case of Itaewon Homicide	Alex "AJ" Jung (Edward Lee)
2010	The City of Crane	Incheon bridge interviews staff
2011	Little Black Dress	assistant director
2012	The Traffickers	Dong-bae
2013	Steal My Heart	Bar part-timer
2014	The Con Artists	lieutenant Gong
2015	Veteran	reporter Park
2017	Because I Love You	Suspect (cameo)
2017	The Discloser	Jeong In Gook
2018	The Witness	Park Sang Tae
2020	The Golden Holiday	Park Chun Shik / Charlie Park
2021	Tomb of the River	
2022	The Killer: A Girl Who Deserves to Die	
2022	Project Wolf Hunting	Mantis
TBA	After	

=== Television series ===
Year	Title	Role	Notes/Ref.
2001	New Nonstop	Park Kyung-lim's colleague	Cameo (episode 391)
2001–2002	Piano	Seok-chol, gangster, Kyung-ho's enemy	
2003	Damo	Ahn Byung-taek	
2003	Argon	Sergeant Bang Heung-sik	
2004	Say You Love Me	Kwon Seok-kwan	
2008	Robber	a comic gangster	
2008	Strongest Chil Woo	Sergeant Oh	
2008	Tazza	Goni's friend / Yoon Seok-hwan	
2010	A Man Called God	Hwang-bo	
2010	Giant	Yeom Shi-deok	
2010	Big Thing	Kim Cheol-gyu	
2011	Midas	Jae-bok	
2011	Spy Myung-wol	Bang Geuk-bong	
2011	Deep Rooted Tree	Park Po	
2012	Immortal Classic	Hwang Geum-ho	
2012	Fashion King	Jang Il-gook	
2012	I Do, I Do	Lee Choong-baek	
2012	KBS Drama Special: "Do I Look Like a Pushover?"	Park Jeong-min	
2012–2013	Jeon Woo-chi	Doong-gae	
2013	Ad Genius Lee Tae-baek	Shin Dong-hoon	
2013	The Secret of Birth	Jong-tae	
2013–2014	Empress Ki	Kkwebo	
2014	Inspiring Generation	Jjang-ddol	
2014	Triangle	Yang Jang-soo	
2014	Blade Man	Seung-hwan	
2015	Shine or Go Crazy	Gil-bok	
2015	Save the Family	Jeong Tae-jin	
2015	The Man in the Mask	Ha Dae-cheol's homeroom	
2015	Mrs. Cop	Bae Dal-hwan	
2015–2016	Six Flying Dragons	Park Po	
2016	Mrs. Cop 2	Bae Dal-hwan	
2016	Monster	Yang Dong-yi	
2016	Dr. Romantic	Webtoon writer	Cameo (Episodes 9–10)
2017	Voice	Shim Young-woon	Season 1; Cameo (Episodes 7–8)
2017	Hit the Top	Noryangjin Academy Instructor	Cameo (episode 1)
2018	Children of a Lesser God	Im Dong-hee	
2018	Welcome to Waikiki	Min Soo-bong	Cameo (episode 11)
2019	Vagabond	Kim Se-hoon	
2019	Leverage	Baek In-Ho	Cameo (episode 7–8)
2020	Tell Me What You Saw	Uhm Soo-tak	Cameo (episode 9,11)
2021	Vincenzo	So Hyun-woo	Cameo (episode 5)
2021	Police University	high school professor	
2021–2022	The All-Round Wife	Kang Seok-gu	
2022	Big Mouth	Peter Hong	Cameo
2022	The Law Cafe	President Kim	
2022	Bad Prosecutor	Yoo Jin-cheol	
2026	Bloody Flower	Jo Woo-Cheol	

=== Web series ===
Year	Title	Role	Ref.
2016	Iron Lady	Go Geun-joon	

=== Television show ===
Year	Title	Role	Notes	Ref.
2016	After The Show Ends	Cast member		
2022	Learning Camping	Cast member		
2023	Golf Battle: Birdie Buddies	Cast member	Season 5	

=== Web shows ===
Year	Title	Role	Ref.
2022	디저볼래	Cast Member	
