= Fashion King (TV series) =

- Promotional poster
- Genre: Romance; Drama
- Written by: Lee Sun-mi; Kim Ki-ho
- Directed by: Myoungwoo Lee
- Starring: Yoo Ah-in; Shin Se-kyung; Kwon Yu-ri; Lee Je-hoon
- Music by: Gaemi
- Ending theme: "Dreaming of You" by Lee Jin-sung
- Country of origin: South Korea
- Original languages: Korean; English
- No. of episodes: 20

Production
- Producer: Choi Moon-suk
- Production locations: Seoul; New York City; Las Vegas
- Camera setup: Multiple-camera setup
- Running time: 60 minutes
- Production company: Lee Kwan-hee Productions

Original release
- Network: SBS
- Release: March 19 – May 22, 2012

Fashion King (Korean: 패션왕; RR: Paesyeonwang) is a 2012 South Korean television drama starring Yoo Ah-in, Shin Se-kyung, Lee Je-hoon, and Kwon Yu-ri. It aired on SBS from March 19 to May 22, 2012, on Mondays and Tuesdays at 21:55 for 20 episodes.

== Plot ==
Fashion King tells the story about a young aspiring designer Kang Young-gul (Yoo Ah-in) who has nothing, and starts his fashion business as a vendor on Dongdaemun Market. He has never had any goals or dreams for a bright future until he meets Lee Ga-young (Shin Se-kyung), who lost both her parents in an accident at a young age, and grew up to be a smart, determined young woman with a natural talent for designing. After receiving a scholarship to a New York fashion school, Ga-young travels to America hoping to achieve her dream of becoming a designer.

Meanwhile, Jung Jae-hyuk (Lee Je-hoon) is a second-generation chaebol to a large enterprise that covers construction, distribution, and fashion, while his ex-girlfriend, Choi Anna (Kwon Yuri), now works under a top internationally renowned designer. Gradually, Jung Jae-hyuk loses interest in Choi Anna and sets his sights onto Lee Ga-young. But Ga-young's heart is for Young-gul, and Young-gul's heart is for Anna, so will this love square ever be settled? And who will win and become Fashion King?

== Cast ==
=== Main cast ===
- Yoo Ah-in as Kang Young-gul
- Shin Se-kyung as Lee Ga-young
- Kwon Yu-ri as Choi Anna
- Lee Je-hoon as Jung Jae-hyuk

=== Supporting cast ===
- Chang Mi-hee as Madame Jo
- Han Yoo-yi as Shin Jung-ah
- Cha Seo-won as Miss Go
- Ra Jae-woong as Chil-bok
- Kim Il-woo as Jung Man-ho
- Lee Hye-sook as Yoon Hyang-sook
- Yoon Gi-won as Secretary Kim
- Kim Byeong-ok as Director Kim

=== Extended cast ===
- Seo Young-joo as young Kang Young-gul
- Kim Sae-ron as young Lee Ga-young
- Go Soo-hee as Young-gul's employee
- Ra Mi-ran as Young-gul's employee
- Jang Eun-bi as Young-gul's employee
- Lee Han-wi as Hwang Tae-san
- Shin Seung-hwan as Jang Il-gook
- Ki Eun-se as Soo-ji
- Yoo Chae-yeong as Bong-sook
- Tory Burch as herself (cameo)
- Vincent D'Elia as himself (cameo)

== Soundtrack ==
Fashion King OST
No.	Title	Artist	Length
1.	"폭우 (Inst.)"	Various Artists
2.	"I'll Be Waiting"	Seohyun	4:47
3.	"Shouldn't Go"	Soul Star (feat. Beige)	4:36
4.	"Love Like This"	Lee Young-hyun (Big Mama)	4:25
5.	"Dreaming of You"	Lee Jin-sung (Monday Kiz)	3:43
6.	"Best Love"	Lee Hyun (8Eight)	3:50
7.	"That Man"	Nam Gyu-ri
8.	"You're a Wall"	M to M	4:50
9.	"Standstill"	K.Heart	4:22
10.	"Appreciate (Inst.)"	Various Artists
11.	"Step 1 (Inst.)"	Various Artists
12.	"폭우 (Inst.)"	Various Artists
13.	"Step 4 (Inst.)"	Various Artists
14.	"Shadow (Inst.)"	Various Artists
15.	"Love Like This"	Lee Je-hoon	5:00

== Ratings ==
In the tables below, the blue numbers represent the lowest ratings and the red numbers represent the highest ratings.

Episode #	Original Airdate	TNmS Ratings		AGB Ratings	
Episode #	Original Airdate	Average audience share			
Episode #	Original Airdate	Entire Country	Seoul National Capital Area	Entire Country	Seoul National Capital Area
1	March 19, 2012	12.4%	14.8%	10.0%	11.0%
2	March 20, 2012	11.5%	13.5%	8.9%	9.5%
3	March 26, 2012	12.3%	14.8%	9.2%	10.5%
4	March 27, 2012	11.6%	14.2%	9.6%	10.9%
5	April 2, 2012	12.6%	14.3%	10.1%	11.4%
6	April 3, 2012	12.7%	14.4%	10.4%	12.0%
7	April 9, 2012	11.9%	14.3%	9.0%	10.3%
8	April 10, 2012	10.7%	12.6%	9.7%	10.6%
9	April 16, 2012	12.5%	13.2%	10.6%	12.0%
10	April 17, 2012	11.1%	13.1%	9.6%	10.7%
11	April 23, 2012	11.3%	11.9%	9.8%	11.2%
12	April 24, 2012	11.6%	14.1%	9.4%	10.7%
13	April 30, 2012	10.8%	13.1%	9.4%	10.6%
14	May 1, 2012	10.9%	13.4%	9.9%	10.8%
15	May 7, 2012	10.7%	12.6%	9.2%	10.0%
16	May 8, 2012	10.9%	12.3%	9.2%	10.0%
17	May 14, 2012	11.0%	12.2%	9.5%	10.4%
18	May 15, 2012	11.4%	12.9%	9.5%	10.4%
19	May 21, 2012	11.2%	13.3%	9.5%	10.1%
20	May 22, 2012	10.8%	12.8%	9.6%	10.4%
Average		11.4%	13.3%	9.6%	10.6%

== Awards and nominations ==
Year	Award	Category	Recipient	Result
2012	5th Korea Drama Awards	Top Excellence Award, Actress	Shin Se-kyung	Nominated
2012	5th Korea Drama Awards	Best New Actress	Kwon Yuri	Nominated
2012	SBS Drama Awards	Top Excellence Award, Actress in a Miniseries	Shin Se-kyung	Nominated
2012	SBS Drama Awards	Excellence Award, Actor in a Miniseries	Yoo Ah-in	Nominated
2012	SBS Drama Awards	Excellence Award, Actress in a Miniseries	Jang Mi-hee	Nominated
2012	SBS Drama Awards	New Star Award	Kwon Yuri	Won
2012	SBS Drama Awards	Best Couple Award	Yoo Ah-in and Shin Se-kyung	Nominated
2013	49th Baeksang Arts Awards	Most Popular Actress (TV)	Kwon Yuri	Won

== International broadcast ==
- It aired in Vietnam on HTV2 from December 7, 2012.
- It aired in Thailand on Workpoint TV in 2012.
