= Hindsight (2011 film) =

- Theatrical poster
- Hangul: 푸른소금
- RR: Pureunsogeum
- MR: P'urŭnsogŭm
- Directed by: Lee Hyun-seung
- Written by: Lee Hyun-seung
- Produced by: Lee Hyun-seung; Ahn Soo-hyun; Kim Sung-min
- Starring: Song Kang-ho; Shin Se-kyung
- Cinematography: Kim Byeong-seo
- Edited by: Kim Sang-bum; Kim Jae-bum; Yu Seung-yeop
- Music by: 3rd Coast
- Production company: Studio Blue
- Distributed by: CJ Entertainment
- Release date: August 31, 2011 (South Korea)
- Running time: 121 minutes
- Country: South Korea
- Language: Korean
- Box office: US$4.9 million

Hindsight (Korean: 푸른소금; RR: Pureunsogeum; lit. 'Blue Salt') is a 2011 South Korean action drama film by Lee Hyun-seung, his first after a ten-year hiatus. The film is about a hitwoman who struggles with her feelings for the underworld boss who is her target. The film deals with issues of age difference, and the Korean underworld. It stars Song Kang-ho and Shin Se-kyung, and premiered at the 16th Busan International Film Festival. The film received a total of 763,776 admissions nationwide.

== Plot ==
Busan, South Korea, the present day. Legendary retired gangster Yoon Doo-hun (Song Kang-ho) dreams of opening a restaurant, and enrolls in a cooking class, where he gets to know Jo Se-bin (Shin Se-kyung). Doo-hun then hears that his former boss, Man-gil, has died after being hit by a car; the gang's members need to find Man-gil's will to see whom he nominated as his successor, though most of them expect it is Doo-hun. Meanwhile, Se-bin's roommate Lee Eun-jung (Esom) has become indebted to some Haeundae moneylenders, who force Se-bin, in return, to spy on Doo-hun. After Eun-jung steals a suitcase containing cocaine from the moneylenders, Se-bin is ordered to kill Doo-hun but can't bring herself to do it. Instead, Eun-jung tries to run him over with a car and subsequently disappears. Doo-hun survives and takes over as head of his old gang, intent on discovering who killed Man-gil. Among various problems, he has to contend with Baek Kyung-min (Lee Jong-hyuk), an ambitious young member of the gang, and his continuing relationship with Se-bin, who is under pressure from assassination agency head Madame Kang (Youn Yuh-jung) to kill him.

== Cast ==
- Song Kang-ho as Yoon Doo-hun, a retired gangster
- Shin Se-kyung as Jo Se-bin, a young national shooting athlete-turned-assassin
- Chun Jung-myung as Ae-gu, Doo-hun's right-hand man
- Lee Jong-hyuk as Baek Kyung-min, Doo-hun's friend and rival
- Kim Min-jun as K, another assassin hired to kill Doo-hun
- Youn Yuh-jung as Madame Kang
- Lee Geung-young as Choi Go-mun
- Kim Roi-ha as Kim Gi-chul
- Oh Dal-su as Teacher Yook
- Esom as Lee Eun-jung, Se-bin's best friend and cooking partner
- Jang Young-nam as Culinary School Instructor
- Kim Jong-gu as Du, gang boss
- Kim Kang-woo as Kim, gang boss
- Jo Young-jin as Ki gang boss
- Jo Deok-je as Ri, gang boss
- Choi Deok-moon as Haeundae, gang boss
- Yang Ki-won as Haeundae, gang deputy
- Lee Jong-pil as Yong-soo
- Jin Yang-hye as News Announcer
