= Shin Se-kyung =

South Korean actress (born 1990)

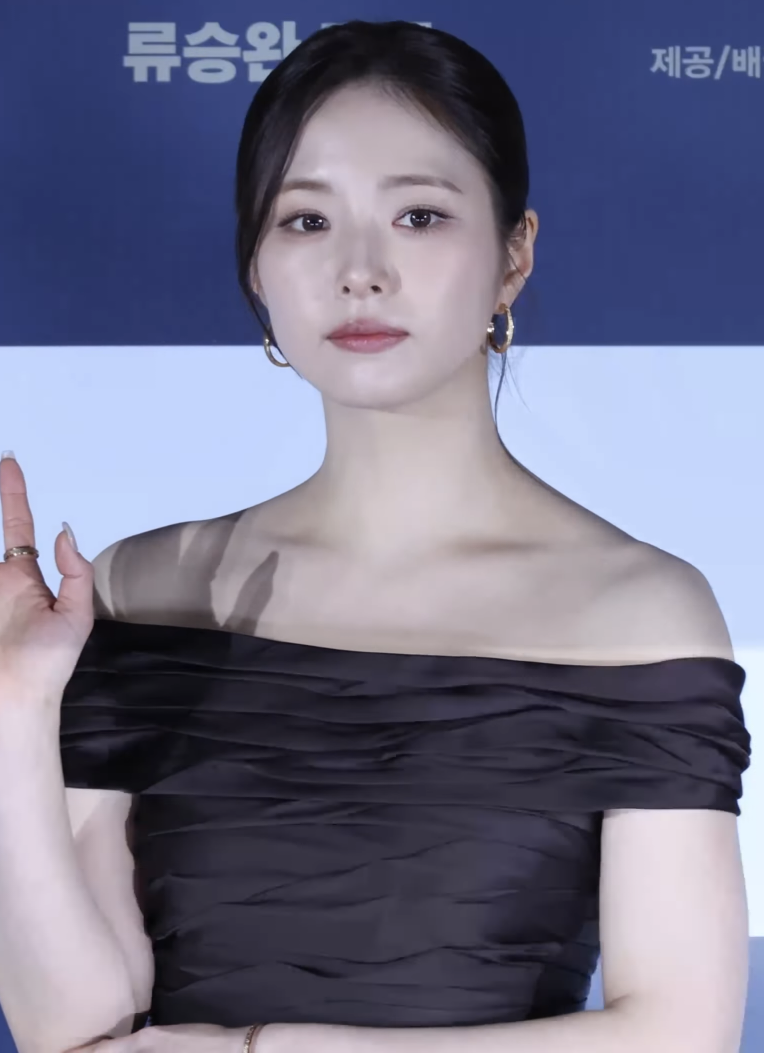
- Shin in January 2026
- Born: July 29, 1990 (age 36); Seoul, South Korea
- Education: Chung-Ang University (Performing arts)
- Occupation: Actress
- Years active: 1998–present
- Agent: The Present Company

Korean name
- Hangul: 신세경
- Hanja: 申世炅
- RR: Sin Segyeong
- MR: Sin Segyŏng
- Website: thepresentcompany.kr

Signature
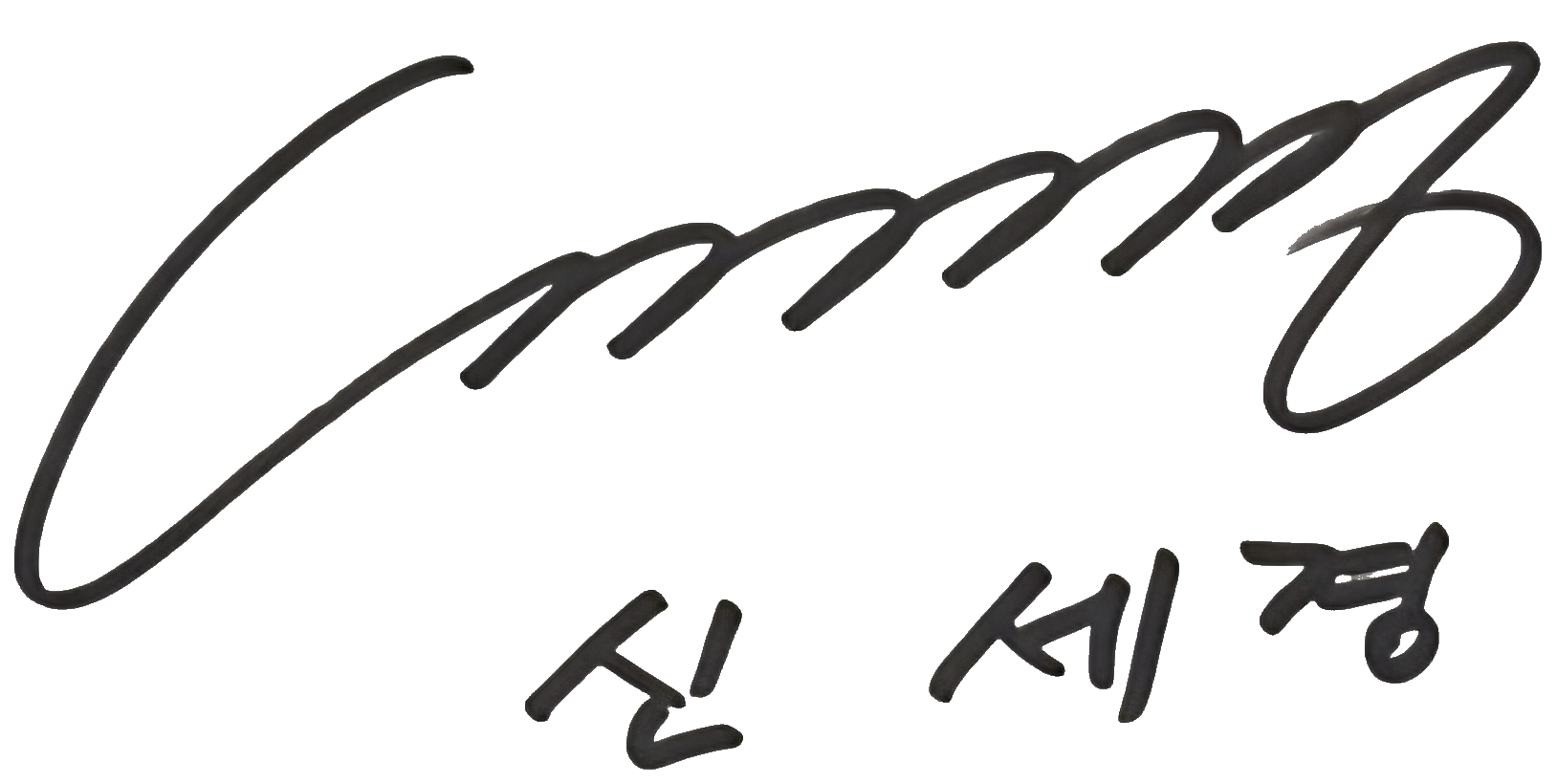

Shin Se-kyung (Korean: 신세경; born July 29, 1990) is a South Korean actress. She started as a child actress and had her breakthrough in the sitcom High Kick Through the Roof (2009). Since then, she starred in the films Hindsight (2011), R2B: Return to Base (2012) and Tazza: The Hidden Card (2014), as well as the television series Deep Rooted Tree (2011), A Girl Who Sees Smells (2015), Six Flying Dragons (2015–2016), The Bride of Habaek (2017), Black Knight: The Man Who Guards Me (2017–2018), Rookie Historian Goo Hae-ryung (2019), Run On (2020) and Captivating the King (2024).

Forbes listed her on the Forbes Korea Power Celebrity 40; she ranked 26th in 2011 and 14th in 2012.

== Early life and education ==
Shin was born on July 29, 1990, in Yangcheon, Seoul, South Korea. She studied at Shinmok High School before enrolling at Chung-Ang University, where she majored in Performing arts.

== Career ==
=== 1998–2009: Beginnings as a child actress ===
Shin made her entertainment debut at eight years old in 1998 when she was featured on the cover and poster for Seo Taiji's solo album Take Five. As a child actress, Shin was already known to Koreans for her appearance in the popular children's show Popopo, which also starred Big Bang's G-Dragon. She spent her childhood hosting children shows.

After a small part in My Little Bride, she subsequently had starring roles in Cinderella, omnibus films Acoustic and Five Senses of Eros, as well as a well-received turn as the younger version of Princess Cheonmyeong in Queen Seondeok.

=== 2009–2014: Rise in popularity and transitioning roles ===
Shin failed to gain a large following until her breakthrough role as a housemaid on the popular TV sitcom High Kick Through the Roof in 2009. Building on her sitcom fame, Shin signed on to numerous television commercials and print advertisement and became one of the most sought celebrity endorser.

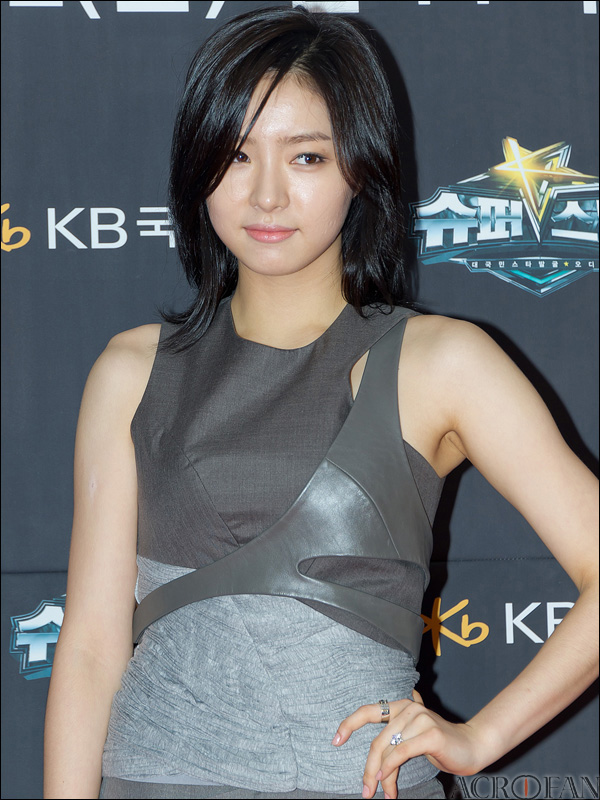
Shin at a Superstar K3 event in 2011

Lead roles in high-profile acting projects followed, among them film noir Hindsight with Song Kang-ho, the highly rated historical drama Deep Rooted Tree with Jang Hyuk and Han Suk-kyu, and aerial action film R2B: Return to Base with Rain. However, Shin's next project Fashion King (2012) was poorly received by audiences, particularly its controversial ending.

Shin then released her first digital single, "You Were Sweet," which she recorded to promote a coffee franchise she models for. A former singer trainee in middle school, Shin has also contributed songs to the soundtrack of Hindsight, the charity album Love Tree Project, and did her own singing in showcase piece Acoustic. In 2012, she recorded a Christmas carol duet with Epitone Project.

Shin returned to television in the 2013 melodrama When a Man Falls in Love opposite Song Seung-heon, but received criticism from viewers for her passive character. In 2014, she played a more "bold and confident" role in the gambling film Tazza: The Hidden Card, followed by the fantasy-action series Blade Man.

=== 2015–present: Resurgence and comeback ===
In a break from her usual dramatic roles, Shin played an aspiring comedian in the webtoon adaptation A Girl Who Sees Smells in 2015 as the titular character. Shin then reunited with Fashion King costar Yoo Ah-in in Six Flying Dragons (2015–2016), another period drama from the screenwriters of Deep Rooted Tree.

In 2017, Shin starred in tvN's fantasy-romance drama The Bride of Habaek alongside Nam Joo-hyuk. This is followed shortly by another fantasy-romance drama, Black Knight: The Man Who Guards Me alongside Kim Rae-won.

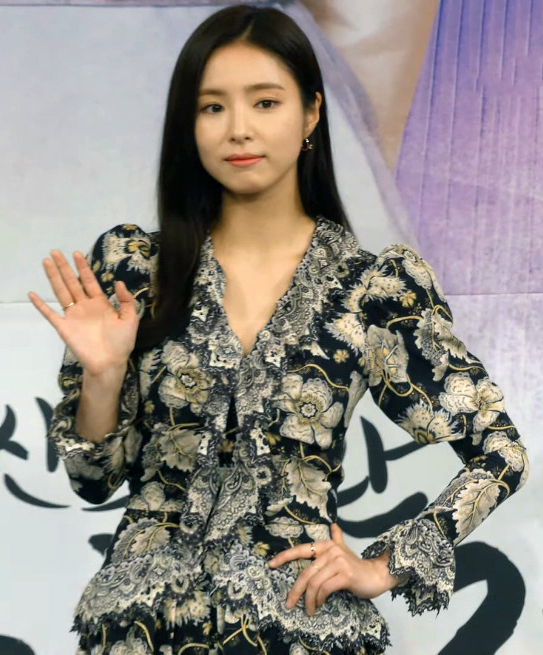
Shin at Rookie Historian Goo Hae-ryung press conference in 2019

In 2019, Shin starred in the historical drama Rookie Historian Goo Hae-ryung, alongside Cha Eun-woo. She played the role of a noble lady who becomes one of the four female historians of the royal court, and won the Top Excellence Award for an Actress and Best Couple Award with Cha Eun-woo at the MBC Drama Awards.

In 2020–2021, Shin starred in JTBC's romance drama Run On, alongside Yim Si-wan. On July 5, 2021, it was announced Shin had signed an exclusive contract with EDAM Entertainment (a subsidiary of Kakao Entertainment) after her contract with Namoo Actors expired.

In 2023, Shin returned to television in the second season of the fantasy drama Arthdal Chronicles: The Sword of Aramun, taking over the role of Tan-ya from Kim Ji-won. Following this, she starred in the historical melodrama Captivating the King (2024) alongside Jo Jung-suk. She played Kang Hee-soo, a genius baduk player who disguises herself as a man to seek revenge but falls in love with the king.

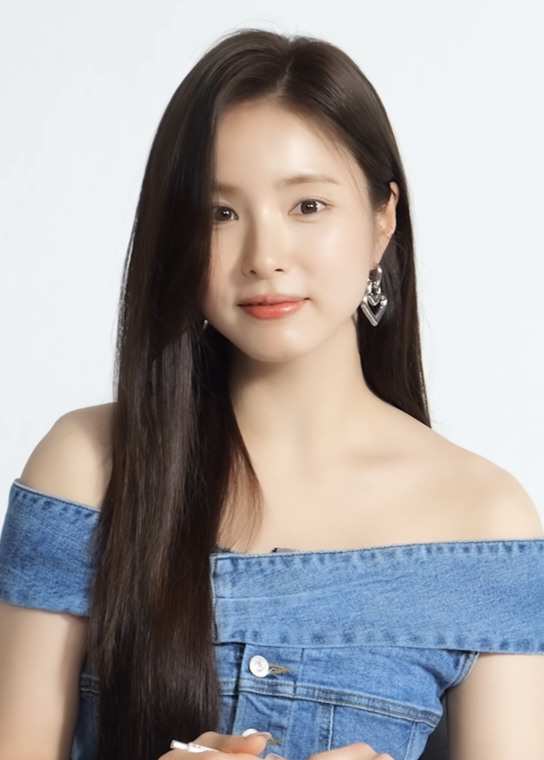
Shin in May 2024

On July 3, 2024, it was announced that Shin has departed from EDAM Entertainment after her contract expiry. On July 8, 2024, Shin signed an exclusive contract with The Present Company.

In September 2024, Shin was cast in the action spy film Humint, where it was announced that she would play Chae Sun Hwa, a North Korean restaurant worker, alongside Jo In Sung as a National Intelligence Service team leader, Park Jung Min as a North Korean State Security Department agent, and Park Hae-joon as Hwang Chi-seong. For her performance, she was awarded the Best Supporting Actress award at the 62nd Baeksang Arts Awards.

In late September 2024, Shin attended the Roger Vivier Spring/Summer 2025 presentation at Paris Fashion Week as the brand's Korean ambassador. She continued her global promotional activities by attending the brand's Fall/Winter 2025 collection show in Paris in March 2025, drawing attention for her sophisticated style.

In September 2026, Shin was cast alongside Jung Hae-in in the romance drama Love Virus.

== Other activities ==
=== Ambassadorship ===
On January 15, 2014, Shin was appointed as the goodwill ambassador for UNESCO's Korean Committee. The honor serves as recognition for her contributions in promoting Korean culture and Education and her advocacy for the Korean language, including her appearance in Deep Rooted Tree. In this capacity, she endorses the vision and the mission of the UNESCO bridge program, both in Korea and outside.

In 2017, Shin was appointed as the Korean hanbok ambassador and attended the hanbok runway show on October 20, 2017.

In 2023, Shin was selected as the Korean ambassador for the French luxury accessory brand Roger Vivier. Since her appointment, she has actively represented the brand at global events, including attending the Paris Fashion Week presentations.

=== Endorsements ===
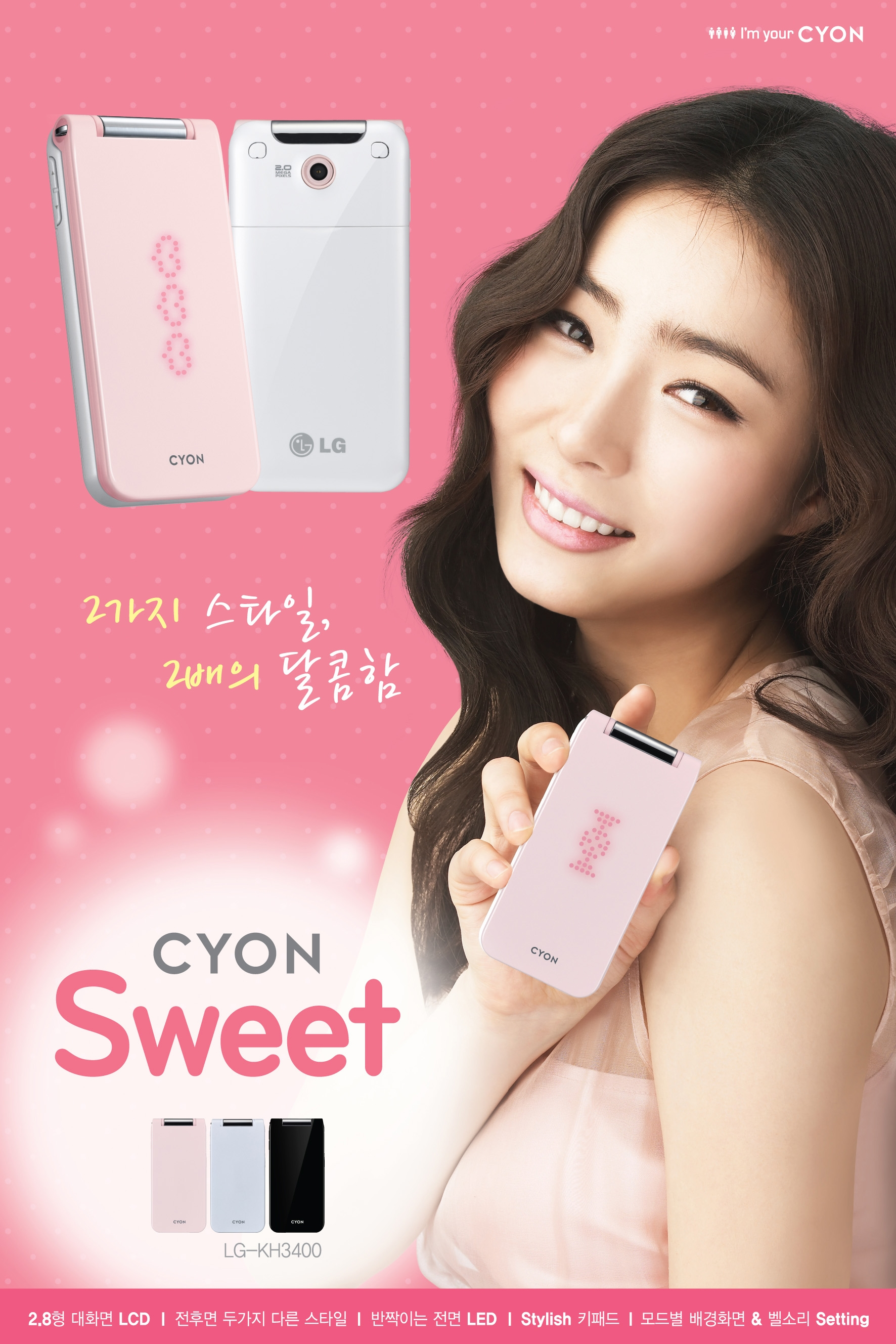
Shin for LG Cyon

In 2006, Shin was selected as the advertising model for School Looks, a school uniform company.

In 2009, she appeared in the commercial for VIPS restaurant along with Park Ye-jin, Lee Yeon-hee, Lee Yoon-ji and Park Shin-hye. Shin was then selected as the model for LG Cyon Crystal phone along with BigBang.

In 2010, Shin was selected as the advertising model for Lotte liquor 'Cheongha'. She was also selected as the model for Aekyung '2080 Cheong-eun Tea' toothpaste. Shin then appeared in the commercial for Lotte Chilsung G2 ion drink. She was selected as the model for the bag brand Lovcat Paris. Shin was then announced as the brand model of BBQ Chicken along with the boygroup BEAST. She was also the model for New Super Mario Bros. Wii Nintendo Korea. Shin was then selected as the model for Namyoung Vivian's lingerie brand 'Vivian'. She was selected as the exclusive model for the clothing brand SOUP.

In 2012, Shin was announced as the model for the Korean cosmetics brand Nature Republic. She then appeared in a commercial for Yakult's R&B. She is also featured in the commercial for Dongseo Food's 'Light Up' cereal.

=== Philanthropy ===
Since the opening of her YouTube channel in 2018, Shin Se Kyung has donated income generated from her videos to help those in need. On December 20, 2022, Shin made a donation from YouTube profits to support sanitary napkins for teenage girls in Korea through the G Foundation.

== Personal life ==
Shin dated Shinee member Kim Jong-hyun in October 2010 until their split in June 2011.

== Filmography ==
Key
†	Denotes films that have not yet been released

=== Film ===
Year	Title	Role	Notes	Ref.
2004	My Little Bride	Hye-won		
2006	Cinderella	Hyeon-su		
2009	Five Senses of Eros	Shin Su-jeong	segment "Believe in the Moment"	
2010	Acoustic	Se-kyung	segment "Broccoli"	
2011	Hindsight	Jo Se-bin		
2012	R2B: Return to Base	Yoo Se-young		
2014	Tazza: The Hidden Card	Heo Mi-na		
2017	The Preparation	Kyeong-ran	Special appearance	
2021	Another Record	herself	Documentary film Showbox KT Season	
2026	Humint	Chae Seon-hwa		

=== Television series ===
Year	Title	Role	Notes	Ref.
2004	Toji, the Land	teenage Choi Seo-hee		
2009	Queen Seondeok	teenage Princess Cheonmyeong		
2009	High Kick Through the Roof	Shin Se-kyung		
2011	Deep Rooted Tree	So-yi / Dam		
2012	High Kick: Revenge of the Short Legged	Se-kyung	Episode 75 (cameo)	
2012	Fashion King	Lee Ga-young		
2012	My Husband Got a Family	Shin Se-kyung	Episode 49 (cameo)	
2013	When a Man Falls in Love	Seo Mi-do		
2014	Blade Man	Son Se-dong		
2015	A Girl Who Sees Smells	Oh Cho-rim / Choi Eun-seol		
2015	Six Flying Dragons	Boon-yi		
2017	The Bride of Habaek	Yoon So-ah		
2017	Black Knight: The Man Who Guards Me	Jung Hae-ra		
2019	Rookie Historian Goo Hae-ryung	Goo Hae-ryung		
2020–2021	Run On	Oh Mi-joo		
2023	Arthdal Chronicles	Tanya	Season 2	
2024	Captivating the King	Kang Hee-soo / Kang Mong-woo		
TBA	Love Virus †	Kang Chae-rin		

=== Television shows ===
Year	Title	Role	Notes	Ref.
2010	I'm Real: Shin Se-kyung	Herself	Documentary	
2012	Forever 22-year-old Cheerleader Sanoam	Narrator	Narration	
2018	Pocha Beyond Borders	Cast member		

=== Music video appearances ===
Year	Song title	Artist	Ref.
1999	"MCMXCIX"	1999 Dae Han Min Guk	
2010	"Don't Say Anything"	BlueBrand	
2017	"Take Five"	Younha	
2022	"One More Time"	Paul Kim	
2025	"Don't Say You Love Me"	Jin	

== Discography ==
Title	Year	Album
As lead artist
"The Snow Melts" (눈이 녹아요)	2010	Love Tree Project
"You Were Sweet" (넌 달콤했어) (featuring Sweden Laundry)	2012	Non-album single
Collaboration
"Sweet Christmas" (달콤한 크리스마스) (with Epitone Project)	2012	Non-album single
Soundtrack appearances
"Confessions Of Dangerous Broccoli" (브로콜리의 위험한 고백)	2010	Acoustic OST
"Summer Blues" (여름날의 블루) (with MY-Q)	2011	Hindsight OST

== Accolades ==
=== Awards and nominations ===
Name of the award ceremony, year presented, category, nominee of the award, and the result of the nomination
Award ceremony	Year	Category	Nominee / Work	Result	Ref.
APAN Star Awards	2015	Excellence Award, Actress in a Miniseries	A Girl Who Sees Smells	Nominated	
APAN Star Awards	2016	Top Excellence in a Serial Drama	Six Flying Dragons	Nominated	
Baeksang Arts Awards	2010	Best New Actress – Television	High Kick Through the Roof	Nominated	
Baeksang Arts Awards	2026	Best Supporting Actress – Film	Humint	Won	
Blue Dragon Film Awards	2011	Best New Actress	Hindsight	Nominated	
Blue Dragon Film Awards	2014	Popular Star Award	Tazza: The Hidden Card	Won	
Brand of the Year Awards	2019	Celebrity YouTuber	Shin Se-kyung	Won	
Grand Bell Awards	2011	Best New Actress	Hindsight	Nominated	
KBS Drama Awards	2014	Excellence Award, Actress in a Miniseries	Blade Man	Nominated	
KBS Drama Awards	2014	Netizen Award, Actress	Blade Man	Nominated	
KBS Drama Awards	2014	Best Couple Award	Shin Se-kyung (with Lee Dong-wook); Blade Man	Nominated	
KBS Drama Awards	2018	Top Excellence Award, Actress	Black Knight: The Man Who Guards Me	Nominated	
KBS Drama Awards	2018	Excellence Award, Actress in a Mid-length Drama	Black Knight: The Man Who Guards Me	Nominated	
KBS Drama Awards	2018	Netizen Award, Actress	Black Knight: The Man Who Guards Me	Nominated	
KBS Drama Awards	2018	Best Couple Award	Shin Se-kyung (with Kim Rae-won); Black Knight: The Man Who Guards Me	Nominated	
Korea Drama Awards	2012	Top Excellence Award, Actress	Fashion King	Nominated	
Korea Drama Awards	2018	Excellence Award, Actress	Black Knight: The Man Who Guards Me	Nominated	
Korea Visual Arts Festival	2011	Photogenic Award, TV category	Deep Rooted Tree	Won	
MBC Drama Awards	2013	Excellence Award, Actress in a Miniseries	When a Man Falls in Love	Won	
MBC Drama Awards	2013	Popularity Award, Actress	When a Man Falls in Love	Nominated	
MBC Drama Awards	2013	Best Couple Award	Shin Se-kyung (with Song Seung-heon); When a Man Falls in Love	Nominated	
MBC Drama Awards	2019	Best Couple Award	Shin Se-kyung (with Cha Eun-woo); Rookie Historian Goo Hae-ryung	Won	
MBC Drama Awards	2019	Top Excellence Award, Actress in a Wednesday-Thursday Drama	Rookie Historian Goo Hae-ryung	Won	
MBC Drama Awards	2019	Grand Prize (Daesang)	Rookie Historian Goo Hae-ryung	Nominated	
MBC Entertainment Awards	2009	Best New Actress	High Kick Through the Roof	Won	
MBC Entertainment Awards	2009	Best Couple Award in a Comedy/Sitcom	Shin Se-kyung (with Yoon Shi-yoon); High Kick Through the Roof	Won	
Mnet 20's Choice Awards	2010	20's Most Influential Star	Shin Se-kyung	Won	
Mnet 20's Choice Awards	2012	20's Female Drama Star	Deep Rooted Tree	Nominated	
Puchon International Fantastic Film Festival	2011	Fantasia Award	High Kick Through the Roof	Won	
SBS Drama Awards	2011	Excellence Award, Actress in a Drama Special	Deep Rooted Tree	Won	
SBS Drama Awards	2012	Top Excellence Award, Actress in a Miniseries	Fashion King	Nominated	
SBS Drama Awards	2012	Netizen Popularity Award	Fashion King	Nominated	
SBS Drama Awards	2012	Best Couple Award	Shin Se-kyung (with Yoo Ah-in); Fashion King	Nominated	
SBS Drama Awards	2015	Excellence Award, Actress in a Serial Drama	Six Flying Dragons	Won	
SBS Drama Awards	2015	Best Couple Award	Shin Se-kyung (with Yoo Ah-in); Six Flying Dragons	Won	
SBS Drama Awards	2015	Top 10 Stars	A Girl Who Sees Smells, Six Flying Dragons	Won	
SBS Drama Awards	2015	Best Couple Award	Shin Se-kyung (with Park Yoo-chun); A Girl Who Sees Smells	Nominated	
Seoul International Drama Awards	2012	Outstanding Korean Actress	Deep Rooted Tree	Nominated	
Soompi Awards	2018	Best Kiss Award	Shin Se-kyung (with Nam Joo-hyuk); The Bride of Habaek	Nominated	
Soompi Awards	2018	Best Couple Award	Shin Se-kyung (with Nam Joo-hyuk); The Bride of Habaek	Nominated	
Style Icon Awards	2011	New Icon Award	Shin Se-kyung	Won	

=== Listicles ===
Name of publisher, year listed, name of listicle, and placement
Publisher	Year	Listicle	Placement	Ref.
Forbes	2011	Korea Power Celebrity 40	26th	
Forbes	2012	Korea Power Celebrity 40	14th	
Korean Film Council	2021	Korean Actors 200 (Note: Introduces 200 actors that best represent the present and future of Korean cinema to the people in the film industry all over the world.)	Included	
