= 1457 =

1457 in various calendars
- Gregorian calendar: 1457; MCDLVII
- Ab urbe condita: 2210
- Armenian calendar: 906; ԹՎ ՋԶ
- Assyrian calendar: 6207
- Balinese saka calendar: 1378–1379
- Bengali calendar: 863–864
- Berber calendar: 2407
- English Regnal year: 35 Hen. 6 – 36 Hen. 6
- Buddhist calendar: 2001
- Burmese calendar: 819
- Byzantine calendar: 6965–6966
- Chinese calendar: 丙子年 (Fire Rat); 4154 or 3947 — to — 丁丑年 (Fire Ox); 4155 or 3948
- Coptic calendar: 1173–1174
- Discordian calendar: 2623
- Ethiopian calendar: 1449–1450
- Hebrew calendar: 5217–5218
- Hindu calendars
- Vikram Samvat: 1513–1514
- Shaka Samvat: 1378–1379
- Kali Yuga: 4557–4558
- Holocene calendar: 11457
- Igbo calendar: 457–458
- Iranian calendar: 835–836
- Islamic calendar: 861–862
- Japanese calendar: Kōshō 3 / Chōroku 1 (長禄元年)
- Javanese calendar: 1372–1374
- Julian calendar: 1457; MCDLVII
- Korean calendar: 3790
- Minguo calendar: 455 before ROC 民前455年
- Nanakshahi calendar: −11
- Thai solar calendar: 1999–2000
- Tibetan calendar: མེ་ཕོ་བྱི་བ་ལོ་ (male Fire-Rat); 1583 or 1202 or 430 — to — མེ་མོ་གླང་ལོ་ (female Fire-Ox); 1584 or 1203 or 431

February 11: China's Emperor Yingzong of Ming returns to the throne in coup d'etat

Year 1457 (MCDLVII) was a common year starting on Saturday of the Julian calendar.

== Events ==
=== January–March ===
- January 21 – Jan IV, Duke of Oświęcim, sells the duchy to the Kingdom of Poland.
- February 11 – In Ming dynasty China, the Emperor Yingzong of Ming is returned to the throne by General Cao Jixiang and other officers who had staged a coup d'etat and overthrown his brother, the Emperor Daizong. Yingzong, whose first reign was the Zhengtong era, proclaims the Tianshun era.
- February 24 – King Charles VIII of Sweden is declared deposed after fleeing from Stockholm to Danzig following a rebellion. The Archbishop of Sweden, Jöns Bengtsson Oxenstierna, and statesman Erik Axelsson Tott become co-regents of Sweden. The coup leaders then offer the throne to Christian I, King of Denmark and Norway.
- March 1 – Prince Zhu Jianshen is designated as the heir to the Chinese throne by his father, the Emperor Yingzong.
- March 6 – King James II of Scotland gives royal assent to laws passed by the Scottish Parliament, including several relating to the killing of various animals including rooks, crows and other birds of prey, as well as red fish, wolves, hares and rabbits Approval is also given for the Wapinschaws Act 1457 (regarding weapon shows, the required gathering of troops for review in each district four times a year) which makes the first written mention of the game of golf. The act declares that while archery is to be used at the gatherings, "the fut bal ande the golf are to be uterly cryt done and not usyt" ("football and golf are to be shouted down and not used", subject to arrest by the King's officers for violations.
- March 14 – Ladislaus Hunyadi, who had assassinated the Hungarian regent Ulrich of Celje on November 9, is arrested soon after being tricked by King Ladislaus V into believing that he would become Lord Treasurer and Captain-General upon his arrival in Budapest. Hunyadi is beheaded two days later by order of the King.
- March 25 – At the age of 11, Mirza Shah Mahmud briefly becomes the Sultan of the Timurid Empire upon the death at Mashhad of the Sultan Abul-Qasim Babur Mirza. Shah Mahmud is overthrown a few weeks later by his cousin Ibrahim Mirza.

=== April–June ===
- April 12 – Ştefan cel Mare secures the throne of Moldavia, which he retains for the next 47 years.
- May 15 – The Swiss city of St. Gallen becomes a free imperial city within the Holy Roman Emperor upon payment of 7,000 gulden to its former abbot, Kaspar von Breitenlandenberg.
- May 25 – The city of Danzig (now Gdańsk) is granted full autonomy by King Casimir IV of Poland.
- June 23 – Christian I is elected king of Sweden, ending the war between Sweden and Denmark and restoring the Kalmar Union.
- June 29 – The Dutch city of Dordrecht is devastated by fire.

=== July–September ===
- July 21 – Former Korean King Danjong (who had been given a comfortable office as "King Emeritus") is arrested after having conspired to reclaim the throne of Korea from his uncle, King Sejo. The other six conspirators (Sŏng Sammun, Pak Paeng-nyeon, Ha Wi-ji, Yi Kae, Yu Ŭngbu, and Yu Sŏngwŏn) are executed, while Danjong is initially spared the death penalty.
- August 14 – The Mainz Psalter, the second major book printed with movable type in the West, the first to be wholly finished mechanically (including colour), and the first to carry a printed date, is printed for the Elector of Mainz.
- September 2 – At the Battle of Albulena, the Albanian general Skanderbeg's defeats Ottoman Empire army, in the open field.

=== October–December ===
- October 22 – After serving as the Doge of the Republic of Venice for 34 years, Francesco Foscari is forced to abdicate by the Council of Ten. Foscari dies 10 days later on November 1 at the age of 84.
- October 30 – Pasquale Malipiero is elected as the new Doge of Venice.
- November 23 – King Ladislaus V, King of Hungary, King of Croatia, and Duke of Austria since 1440, as well as King of Bohemia since 1453, dies suddenly at the age of 17 while in Prague. Although suspected by his allies to have been the victim of poisoning, examination of his remains indicates later that he died from bubonic plague. Frederick III, Holy Roman Emperor is declared Duke of Austria, while Matthias Corvinus attempts to become the new King of Hungary and Croatia, while George of Poděbrady vies to become the new King of Bohemia.
- December 23 – Pope Calixtus III declares Albanian hero Skanderbeg to be a Captain-General of the Holy See and gives him the title Athleta Christi ("Champion of Christ").

=== Date unknown ===
- Albrechts University is founded at Freiburg im Breisgau.
- Edo Castle is built by Ōta Dōkan in modern-day Tokyo.
- Oirat Taiji-Asamanji (Uch-Timur) set out on a devastating campaign in Central Asia

== Births ==
- January 18 – Antonio Trivulzio, seniore, Roman Catholic cardinal (d. 1508)
- January 28 – King Henry VII of England (d. 1509)
- February 2 – Peter Martyr d'Anghiera, Italo-Spanish historian and diplomat (d. 1526)
- February 13 – Mary of Burgundy, sovereign duchess regnant of Burgundy, married to Maximilian I, Holy Roman Emperor (d. 1482)
- August 20 – Seongjong of Joseon, King of Joseon (d. 1494)
- September 21 – Hedwig Jagiellon, Duchess of Bavaria, Polish princess (d. 1502)
- November 16 – Beatrice of Naples, Hungarian queen (d. 1508)
- date unknown – Richard Grey, English knight, half brother of Edward V (executed 1483)
- probable
  - Sebastian Brant, German humanist and satirist (d. 1521)
  - Filippino Lippi, Florentine painter (d. 1504)
  - Jacob Obrecht, Dutch composer (d. 1505)
  - Thomas West, 8th Baron De La Warr (d. 1525)

== Deaths ==
- March 14 – Jingtai Emperor of China (b. 1428)
- March 16 – László Hunyadi, Hungarian statesman and warrior (b. 1433)
- May 22 – Saint Rita of Cascia, Italian saint (b. 1381)
- August 1 – Lorenzo Valla, Italian humanist
- August 19 – Andrea del Castagno, Italian painter (b. 1421)
- September 12 – Gabriele Sforza, Archbishop of Milan (b. 1423)
- September 14 – Countess Palatine Margaret of Mosbach, countess consort of Hanau (b. 1432)
- September 22 – Peter II, Duke of Brittany (b. 1418)
- November 3 – Ludwig II, Count of Württemberg-Urach, German noble (b. 1439)
- November 23 – King Ladislaus Posthumus of Bohemia and Hungary (b. 1440)
- December 24 – Danjong of Joseon, King of Joseon (b. 1441)
- date unknown
  - Abul-Qasim Babur Mirza, ruler of Khurasan (b. 1422)
  - Bartolomeu Perestrello, Portuguese navigator and explorer (b. 1395)
