= Mongyudowondo =

1447 Korean painting by An Kyŏn

Mongyudowondo (Korean: 몽유도원도; Hanja: 夢遊桃源圖; Romaji: Muyūtōgenzu), translated as Dream Journey to the Peach Blossom Land, is an 1447 ink wash painting by the Joseon dynasty court painter An Gyeon. Commissioned by Grand Prince Anpyeong, it depicts his dream of visiting a utopian land. The painting is accompanied by writings by Anpyeong and numerous literati, making it an important work of the early Joseon period. It is regarded as the oldest surviving Korean landscape painting. The work was later taken to Japan during the Imjin War and is currently stored at Tenri University. It is designated as a National Treasure of Japan.

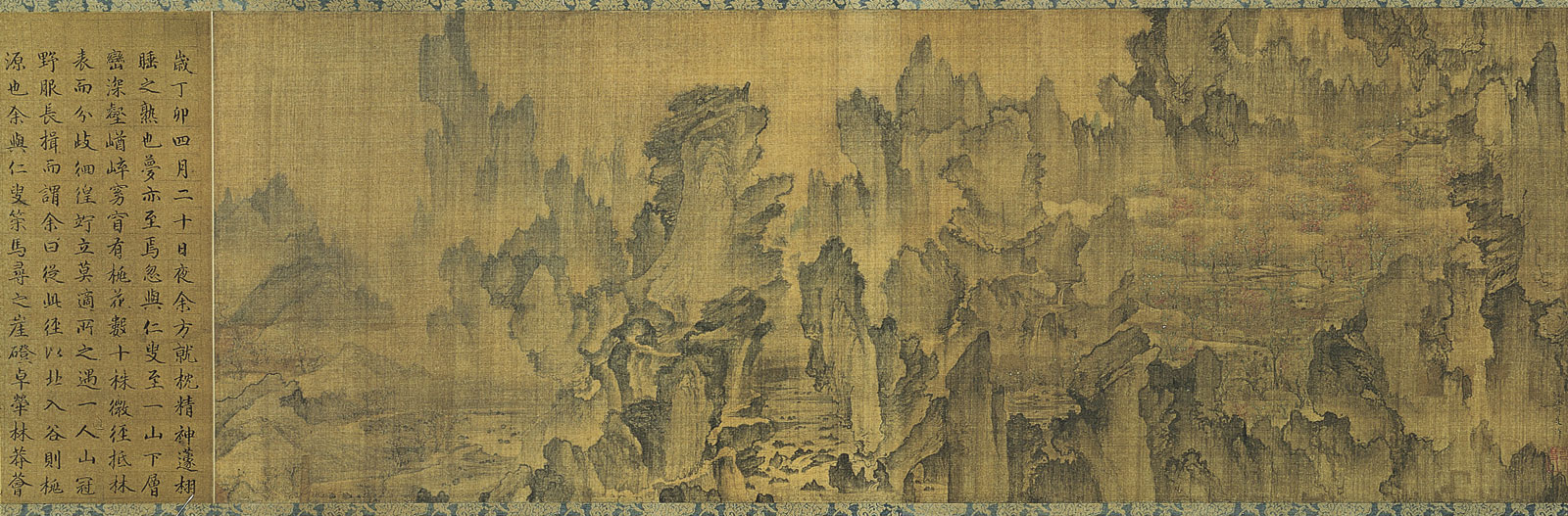
Mongyu dowondo (Dream Journey to the Peach Blossom Land)

== History ==
In 1447, Grand Prince Anpyeong asked the painter An Gyeon to recreate a dream in which he visited a paradise. An completed the painting in only three days. Anpyeong was pleased with the painting and wrote a lengthy inscription (제기; 題記) on how it was created as well as the painting's title. He also asked 21 literati to write poems and inscriptions praising the work. The writings by them are approximately 20 meters long. Three years later, Anpyeong wrote a poem to accompany the work.

Anpyeong's father King Sejong passed away in 1450. His older brother King Munjong also passed away in 1452 and King Danjong ascended the throne. After his older brother Grand Prince Suyang seized power through the Gyeyu Coup in 1453, Anpyeong was accused of treason, exiled to Ganghwa Island, and eventually executed. The reason for his execution is thought to be that Suyang perceived Anpyeong’s frequent artistic gatherings as a political faction and was jealous of his artistic talent. Suyang later destroyed much of Anpyeong's works. Among those who wrote the inscriptions, Bak Paengnyeon, Yi Kae and Seong Sammun became three of the six martyred ministers while Sin Sukchu and Choe Hang sided with Suyang.

Later, the painting is thought to have been looted by Japanese general Shimazu Yoshihiro during the Imjin War. It was later found in 1893 in Kagoshima, Japan and was bequeathed to Tenri University in 1953. It is designated as a National Treasure of Japan. In 2009, the painting was temporarily displayed in the National Museum of Korea, celebrating the centennial anniversary of Korean museums.

== Description ==
Drawn on silk, the painting is 106.5 cm wide and 38.7 cm long. Although the influence of the Northern Song court painter Guo Xi such as brushwork and lighting effects can be found in the work, the painting demonstrates that An Gyeon had developed an artistic style of his own. Unlike the conventional composition of handscroll paintings, the narrative of the painting begins at the lower left and moves upward to the right. The real world represented by earthen mountains is located on the left while the dream world represented by rocky mountains is situated on the right. The most distinctive feature is that the overall landscape is composed of several separate yet harmoniously integrated groups of scenery, which influenced paintings of early Joseon and the Muromachi period of Japan. Also, the painting is not drawn from a single perspective: the real world is depicted from a frontal viewpoint while the dream world is drawn using bird's-eye view. Unlike Chinese peach garden paintings, people or animals are not depicted at all. Human presence is only suggested by a partially concealed boat and two small pavilions nestled among peach trees.

The painting is also has great calligraphic value as it is accompanied by a postscript and poem written by Anpyeong as well as 23 writings by 20 literati and one Buddhist monk. The poems are written in semi-cursive script and regular script.

The painting is considered as a monumental work that brings together the cultural and artistic achievements of the early Joseon period. It is considered as the oldest landscape painting by a Korean artist and the oldest extant Joseon dynasty painting with a known production year.

=== Themes ===
The peach blossom land is a fictional utopia from a story by the Chinese poet Tao Yuanming. In the story, after following a stream lined with peach trees, a poor fisherman discovers a utopia hidden in a cave where refugees who fled war and oppression under Qin Shi Huang have lived in harmony for generations. The painting and writings depict both the Confucian ideal of entering public service in pursuit of a peaceful and prosperous country and the Taoist idea of an utopian realm.

== Legacy ==
An Gyeon and his followers led the most influential school of landscape painting during the early Joseon dynasty. Their works were characterized by an asymmetrical three-part composition, carefully arranged objects within open spaces, and a striking contrast between black and white. This style of landscape painting later influenced painters of the Muromachi period in Japan, notably Tenshō Shūbun.

== In modern media ==
The Sinmongyudowondo series by Seok Chul-joo, a professor at Chugye University for the Arts, reinterprets Mongyudowondo using Korean and Western painting techniques.

Canvas of Blood (Korean title Mongyudowondo), a South Korean film centered on Grand Prince Suyang and Anpyeong, is scheduled to be released in 2026.

== See also ==
- Korean painting
