= List of Joseon people =

List of historical humans

This is a partial list of people who lived during the Joseon period of Korea, 1392–1910.

== Rulers ==
See: List of Korean monarchs

#	Personal name		Period of reign	Courtesy Name (C)/ Pseudonym (Ps)		Temple name (廟號) (T) / Posthumous name (諡號) (P)	
#	Romanized	Hangul/Hanja	Period of reign	Romanized	Hangul/Hanja	Romanized	Hangul/Hanja
1	Yi Sŏnggye	이성계 李成桂	1392–1398	Junggyeol (C)	중결 仲潔 (C)	Taejo	태조 太祖 (T)
2	Yi Panggwa	이방과 李芳果	1398–1400	Gwangwon (C)	광원 光遠 (C)	Jeongjong	정종 定宗 (T)
3	Yi Pangwŏn	이방원 李芳遠	1400–1418	Yudeok (C)	유덕 遺德(C)	Taejong	태종 太宗 (T)
4	Yi To	이도 李祹	1418–1450	Wonjeong (C)	원정 元正 (C)	Sejong the Great	세종 世宗 (T)
5	Yi Hyang	이향 李珦	1450–1452	Hwiji (C)	휘지 輝之(C)	Munjong	문종 文宗 (T)
6	Yi Hongwi	이홍위 李弘緯	1452–1455			Danjong	단종 端宗 (T)
7	Yi Yu	이유 李瑈	1455–1468	Suji (C)	수지 粹之 (C)	Sejo	세조 世祖 (T)
8	Yi Kwang	이광 李晄	1468–1469	Myungjo/Pyeongnam (C)	명조/평남 明照/平南 (C)	Yejong	예종 睿宗 (T)
9	Yi Hyŏl	이혈 李娎	1469–1494		(C)	Seongjong	성종 成宗 (T)
10	Yi Yung	이융 李隆	1494–1506		(C)	Yeonsangun	연산군 燕山君
11	Yi Yŏk	이역 李懌	1506–1544	Nakcheon (C)	낙천 樂天 (C)	Jungjong	중종 中宗 (T)
12	Yi Ho	이호 李峼	1544–1545	Cheonyun (C)	천윤 天胤 (C)	Injong	인종 仁宗 (T)
13	Yi Hwan	이환 李峘	1545–1567	Daeyang (C)	대양 對陽 (C)	Myeongjong	명종 明宗 (T)
14	Yi Yŏn	이연 李蚣	1567–1608			Seonjo	선조 宣祖 (T)
15	Yi Hon	이혼 李琿	1608–1623		(C)	Gwanghaegun	광해군 光海君
16	Yi Chong	이종 李倧	1623–1649	Hwabaek (C)	화백 和伯(C)	Injo	인조 仁祖 (T)
17	Yi Ho	이호 李淏	1649–1659	Jeongyeon (C); Juko (Ps)	정연/靜淵 (C) 죽오/竹梧 (Ps)	Hyojong	효종 孝宗 (T)
18	Yi Yŏn	이연 李棩	1659–1674	Gyungjik (C)	경직 景直 (C)	Hyeonjong	현종 顯宗 (T)
19	Yi Sun	이순 李焞	1674–1720	Myungbo (C)	명보 明普 (C)	Sukjong	숙종 肅宗 (T)
20	Yi Yun	이윤 李昀	1720–1724	Hwiseo (C)	휘서 輝瑞 (C)	Gyeongjong	경종 景宗 (T)
21	Yi Kŭm	이금 李昑	1724–1776	Gwangsuk (C); Yangseongheon (Ps)	광숙/光叔 (C) 양성헌/養性軒 (Ps)	Yeongjo	영조 英祖 (T)
22	Yi San	이산 李祘	1776–1800	Hyeongun (C); Hongjae (Ps)	형운/亨運 (C) 홍재/弘齋 (Ps)	Jeongjo	정조 正祖 (T)
23	Yi Kong	이공 李蚣	1800–1834	Gongbo (C); Sunjae (Ps)	공보/公寶(C) 순재/純齋 (Ps)	Sunjo	순조 純祖 (T)
24	Yi Hwan	이환 李奐	1834–1849	Muneung (C); Wonheon (Ps)	문응/文應 (C) 원헌/元軒 (Ps)	Heonjong	헌종 憲宗 (T)
25	Yi Pyŏn	이변 李昪	1849–1863	Dosung (C); Daeyongjae (Ps)	도승/道升(C) 대용재/大勇齋(Ps)	Cheoljong	철종 哲宗 (T)
26	Yi Myŏngbok	이명복 李命福	1863–1897 (1907)*	Seongrim (C); Juyeon (Ps)	성림/聖臨(C) 주연/珠淵 (Ps)	Gojong	고종 高宗 (T)
27	Yi Ch'ŏk	이척 李拓	(1907–1910)*	Gunbang (C); Jeongheon (Ps)	군방/君邦(C) 정헌/正軒 (Ps)	Sunjong	순종 純宗 (T)

=== Royals ===
- Grand Prince Yangnyeong
- Queen Munjeong
- Queen Inhyeon
- Prince Sado
- Queen Jeongsun
- Heungseon Daewongun
- Lady Hyegyŏng
- Empress Myeongseong
- Empress Sunjeong

== Scholar-officials ==
Scholar-officials, or munsin, held much of the power in the Joseon Dynasty bureaucracy. Many members of the intellectual elite, also remembered for their work as poets or philosophers, served as scholar-officials. Such service, however, was restricted to members of the hereditary yangban class.

- Chŏng Tojŏn
- Ha Ryun
- Kwŏn Kŭn
- Chŏng Inji
- Hwang Hŭi
- Hwangbo In
- Kim Chongsŏ
- Yu Ŭngbu
- Yu Sŏngwŏn
- Pak P'aengnyŏn
- Sŏng Sammun
- Ha Wiji
- Yi Kae
- Kim Chil
- Sin Sukchu
- Han Myŏnghoe
- Ch'oe Sejin
- Kim Chong-jik
- Yi Ŏnjŏk
- Cho Kwangjo
- Yun Im
- Yun Wŏnhyŏng
- Yi Hwang
- Cho Sik
- Sŏng Hon
- Yu Sŏngnyong
- Yi Sanhae
- Yi I
- Kim Jang-saeng
- Kim Jip
- Chŏng Ch'ŏl
- Cho Hŏn
- Kim Yuk
- Yi Sugwang
- Song Si-yŏl
- Ch'ae Chegong
- Sin Kwangsu
- Yu Hyeong-won
- Yi Ik
- Yun Hyu
- Pak Chiwŏn
- Song Chun-gil
- Hong Taeyong
- Yu Deuk-gong
- Chŏng Yagyong
- Pak Chega
- Kim Chŏnghŭi
- Pak Kyusu
- Pak Yŏnghyo
- Kim Okkyun
- Yi Yuwŏn

== Military officials ==
Military service was technically open to people outside the yangban class, but in practice most high posts were held by the aristocracy.

- Yi Il
- Sin Rip
- Yi Sun-sin
- Kwŏn Yul
- Kim Simin
- Yi Ŏkki
- Wŏn Kyun
- Gang Hong-rip
- Shin Ryu

== Others ==
The common classes of Joseon included the yangmin free farmers, the jungin technical class, and the cheonmin underclass. These constituted the bulk of Joseon society, but only a handful of them are known to us today.

=== Women ===
Prominent women of the Joseon period were usually either of the high aristocratic class or kisaeng female entertainers.

- Hwang Jin-i
- Non Gae
- Jang Geum, royal physician
- Yi Mae-chang
- Seo Yeongsuhap, poet and mathematician

=== Popular leaders ===
- Choe Je-u
- Hong Gyeong-nae
- Jeon sang ki

=== Painters ===
- Danwon
- Gyeomjae
- Hyewon
- Owon

=== Authors ===
Many of the best-known writers of the Joseon period were also scholar-officials; they are listed above.

- Kim Jeong-ho

=== Inventors ===
Some scholar-officials, such as Chŏng Yagyong, also worked as inventors.

- Chang Yŏngsil

== See also ==
- List of Silla people
- List of Goryeo people
- History of Korea
