= Seong =

- Hangul: 성
- Hanja: 成
- RR: Seong
- MR: Sŏng

Seong (Korean: 성), also spelled Song or Sung, is an uncommon Korean family name.

== Overview ==
The family name Seong is written with only one hanja character, meaning "succeed" or "accomplish" (成). The 2000 South Korean Census found 167,903 people with this family name, up by six percent from 158,385 in the 1985 census. This increase was far smaller than the fifteen percent growth in the overall South Korean population over the same period. They traced their origins to only a single bon-gwan, Changnyeong County. This was also the place where they formed the highest concentration of the local population, with 2,360 people (3.61%).

In a study by the National Institute of the Korean Language based on 2007 application data for South Korean passports, it was found that 67.4% of people with this surname spelled it in Latin letters as Sung in their passports. The Revised Romanisation spelling Seong was in second place at 29.4%. Rarer alternative spellings (the remaining 3.2%) included Seung, Shung, and the Yale Romanisation spelling Seng.

=== Government and politics ===
- Sŏng Sammun (1418–1456), Joseon Dynasty official
- Sŏng Sŭng (died 1456), Joseon Dynasty official
- Sŏng Hŭian (1461–1513), Joseon Dynasty official
- Sŏng Hon (1535–1598), Joseon Dynasty official
- Ui-bin Seong (1753–1786), Joseon Dynasty concubine
- Sung Jusik (1891–1956), Korean independence activist, later a North Korean politician
- Seong Hye-rang (born 1935), North Korean defector
- Sung Yun-mo (born 1963), South Korean politician
- Sung Jae-gi (1967–2013), South Korean activist

=== Popular culture ===
- Sung Dong-il (born 1964), South Korean actor
- Sung Han-bin (born 2001), South Korean singer and dancer, member of boy group Zerobaseone
- Sung Hoon (singer, born 1980), South Korean singer
- Song Hye-rim (1937–2002), North Korean actress and mistress of Kim Jong-il
- Sung Hyun-ah (born 1975), South Korean actress
- Sung Ji-ru (born 1968), South Korean actor
- Sung Si-kyung (born 1979), South Korean ballad singer
- Yuri Nakamura (Sung Woo-ri, 1982–2026), Japanese-born South Korean actress and former singer
- Sung Yu-bin (born 2000), South Korean actor
- Sung Yu-ri (born 1981), South Korean pop singer

=== Sport ===
- Sung Nak-woon (1923–1986), South Korean football forward
- Seong Nak-gun (born 1962), South Korean sprinter
- Sung Han-kook (born 1963), South Korean badminton player
- Sung Jung-a (born 1965), South Korean basketball player
- Sung Kyung-hwa (born 1965), South Korean handball player
- Sung Hee-jun (born 1974), South Korean long jumper
- Sung Han-soo (born 1976), South Korean football forward (K League 1)
- Sung Jong-hyun (born 1979), South Korean football defender (K League 1, China League One)
- Sung Kyung-mo (born 1980), South Korean football goalkeeper (K League 1)
- Sung Min (swimmer) (born 1982), South Korean swimmer
- Sung Hyun-ah (footballer) (born 1982), South Korean football forward
- Seong Kyung-il (born 1983), South Korean football goalkeeper (K League 1)
- Sung Si-bak (born 1987), South Korean short track speed skater
- Seong Se-hyeon (born 1990), South Korean curler
- Sung Ji-hyun (born 1991), South Korean badminton player
- Sung Eun-ryung (born 1992), South Korean luger
- Seong Ji-hoon (born 1997), South Korean curler
- Seong Eun-jeong (born 1999), South Korean professional golfer
- Sung Nak-so, South Korean table tennis player

=== Other ===
- Seong Changyeong (1930–2013), South Korean poet
- Seong Baek-in (1933–2018), South Korean Tungusologist
- Dan Keun Sung (born 1952), South Korean electronic engineer
- Wonyong Sung (born c. 1954), South Korean professor of electronic and information engineering
- Jung Mo Sung (born 1957), South Korean-born Brazilian theologian
- Doris Sung (born 1964), American educator of Korean descent
- Seung-Yong Seong (born 1965), South Korean immunologist
- Kiwan Sung (born 1967), South Korean poet
- Hugh Sung (born 1968), American classical pianist of Korean descent
- Shi-Yeon Sung (born 1975), South Korean classical conductor
- Steve Sung (born 1985), South Korean poker player
- Mikyung Sung (born 1993), South Korean double bass player
- Lea Seong, South Korean fashion designer

=== Fictional characters ===
- Seong Chun-hyang, the title character of the folk tale Chunhyangjeon
- Seong Mi-na, in Japanese fighting game series Soulcalibur
- Sung Jinwoo, protagonist of the South Korean light novel and manhwa, Solo Leveling
- Seong Gi-hun, the main character of the television series Squid Game
- Seong Taehoon, the main supporting character of the manhwa How To Fight

== See also ==
- List of Korean family names
