= Hall of Worthies =

1420–1456 Korean royal research institute

- 집현전
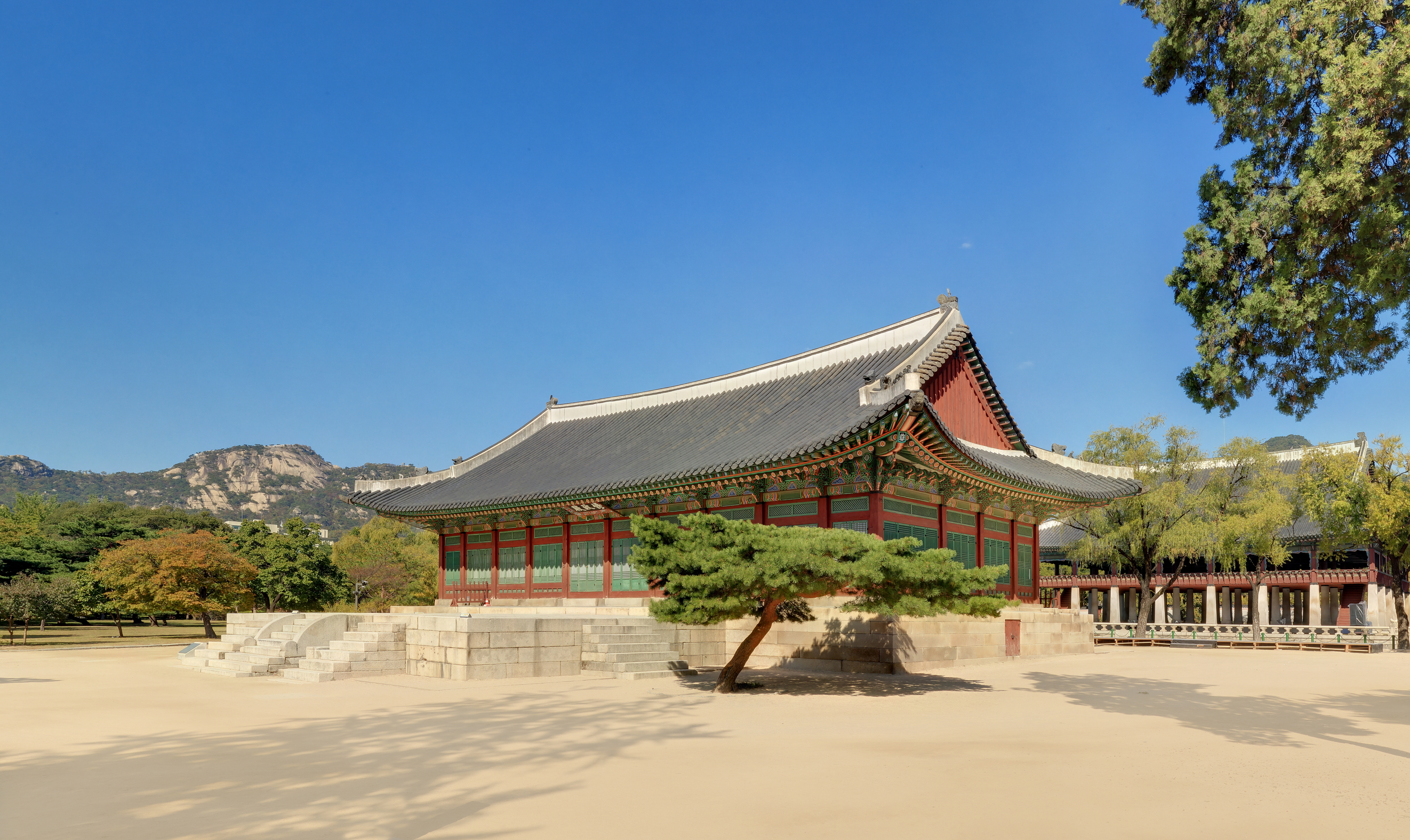
- Sujeongjeon in the palace Gyeongbokgung, a building once used by the Hall of Worthies
- Established: 3rd month of 1420
- Founder: Sejong the Great
- Dissolved: 6th month of 1456
- Type: Research institute
- Location: Seoul, Joseon
- Coordinates: 37°34′43″N 126°58′38″E

Korean name
- Hangul: 집현전
- Hanja: 集賢殿
- RR: Jiphyeonjeon
- MR: Chiphyŏnjŏn
- IPA: [tɕi.pʰjʌn.dʑʌn]

The Hall of Worthies, or Chiphyŏnjŏn (Korean: 집현전; Hanja: 集賢殿), was a Korean royal research institute during the Joseon period. Although the institute de jure had existed for a long time even before the dynasty, it became a significant institution only after being reformed fundamentally by King Sejong the Great in the 3rd month of 1420, until it was dissolved in the 6th month of 1456 by King Sejo.

The Hall of Worthies is known for its role in compiling the Hunminjeongeum, the original treatise on Hangul.

== History ==
Sejong had the Hall of Worthies reestablished in 1420 and staffed it with talented scholars. Modern historians have likened the institution to a think tank; it oversaw major cultural and intellectual pursuits, especially for issues of governance, as well as the education of the king and crown prince. In 1426, Sejong ordered that the institution began a practice called saga toksŏ: allowing scholars to independently research without participating in government work; this has been likened to modern research grants.

The Hall of Worthies originally functioned as a royal advisory body, but King Sejong restructured it and expanded its role to include academic research. Early in King Sejong's reign, the Hall of Worthies served as a legislative system, but its role eventually grew to hold discussions regarding Joseon's national policy. The Hall of Worthies would also later act as an organ of the press.

The workplace of the scholars from the Hall of Worthies was located in the Gwollaegaksa, a series of government offices located in Gyeongbok Palace. It is assumed that the Gwolaegaksa was located around where the current building of Sujeongjeon Hall resides. There used to be several buildings at Gwollaegaksa, but Sujeongjeon Hall is the only building that remains in well-preserved condition.

The Hall of Worthies was disbanded by King Sejo after many of its members (notably the six martyred ministers) plotted to assassinate Sejo in 1456, following the latter's usurpation of the throne from King Danjong. However, a similar organization, the Hongmun'gwan (Office of Special Advisors) continued much of the same work, though without enjoying the same prestige or output it had during the earlier period. There was an attempt to make the government office Yemun'gwan into a spiritual successor to the Hall of Worthies, but Peterson evaluated that office as failing to reach the heights of its predecessor. The practice of saga toksŏ (research grants) was abandoned by King Sejo, but was revived under King Seongjong (r. 1469–1495).

== Works ==
The Hall of Worthies participated in various scholarly endeavors, one of which was compiling the Hunminjeongeum. Hangul was personally created by Sejong the Great, and revealed by him in 1443. Afterward, King Sejong wrote the preface to the Hunminjeongeum, explaining the origin and purpose of Hangul and providing brief examples and explanations, and then tasked the Hall of Worthies to write detailed examples and explanations. The head of the Hall of Worthies, Chŏng Inji, was responsible for compiling the Hunminjeongeum. The Hunminjeongeum was published and promulgated to the public in 1446 in order to increase the literacy of the general populace.

Confucian ideals were very important to King Sejong, and he wanted his subjects to have a medium through which they could learn the ethics and morals of Confucianism. During his 14th year in power, King Sejong instructed his scholars at the Hall of Worthies to compile outstanding examples of the fundamental principles in human relationships (filial piety, loyalty to the state, and wifely devotion) from both Korean and Chinese history. This compilation of works would become the book "Conduct of the Three Fundamental Principles in Human Relationships" (Samgang Haengshildo, Hanja: 三綱行實圖, 삼강행실도). Unfortunately, this work was originally recorded in Chinese characters, and thus, the general public could not read it until it was translated into Hangul some 30 years later.

Besides contributing to the Hunminjeongeum and publishing the Samgang Haengshildo, King Sejong sponsored books such as "The Songs of the Flying Dragons" (Yongbieocheonga) and eulogies of his ancestors, the Hall of Worthies was involved in the publication of numerous scholarly and scientific writings, which contributed to the reputation of Sejong's reign as the golden age of Korean culture.

== Communications with other groups ==
When Ming envoys came to Joseon in 1450 to pronounce the ascension of Emperor Jingdi, members of both the Hall of Worthies and Ming envoys exchanged poems in a tradition now called Hwanghwajip. The Ming envoys were led by Ni Qian, who befriended Hall of Worthies scholars Chŏng Inji, Sŏng Sammun, and Sin Sukchu. Both sides would exchange poems several times during the visit. This continual exchange of poems and other tributary gifts led to a strong relationship between the Joseon and the Ming until the Ming's fall in 1644.

== Members ==
- Chŏng Inji (정인지, 1396–1478)
- Sin Sukchu (신숙주, 1417–1475)
- Ch'oe Hang, 1409–1474)
- Sŏng Sammun (성삼문, 1418–1456)
- Pak P'aengnyŏn (박팽년, 1417–1456)
- Yi Kae (이개, 1417–1456)
- Yu Sŏngwŏn (유성원, ? – 1456)
- Yi Sukhyŏng (이숙형, 1415–1477)
- Sŏ Kŏjŏng (서거정, 1420–1488)

=== Members who plotted against King Sejo ===
- Pak Chungnim: minister, father of Pak Paengnyeon
- Pak P'aengnyŏn: vice-minister, one of six martyred ministers
- Ha Wiji: vice-minister, one of six martyred ministers
- Sŏng Sammun: royal secretary, one of six martyred ministers
- Yi Kae: chief of the Hall of Worthies, one of six martyred ministers
- Yu Sŏngwŏn: high official of Sungkyunkwan, one of six martyred ministers
- Pak Innyŏn: younger brother of Pak Paengnyeon
- Pak Kinyŏn: younger brother of Pak Paengnyeon
- Hŏ Cho: brother-in-law of Yi Kae
- Sim Shin

== See also ==
- Joseon Dynasty politics
- Korean Confucianism
