= Religious influence on Korean art =

Korean art has always been heavily influenced by its contemporaries like Buddhism, Shamanism, Taoism, and later, Christianity. This impact is quite visible when it comes to analysing some major Korean art forms such as landscape painting and sculpture. Korean culture and art have always been heavily influenced by ample religious elements that further shaped people's behaviour and thought process. While during the early stages of Korean history, religious and political functions were one and the same, but they gradually separated.

== Landscape painting in Korean art ==
Landscape painting gradually became one of the most prominent and integral aspects of Korean art and culture. Due to the heavy influence of the Confucianism and neo-Confucianism philosophy that attaches superior values to Nature than human activities. As per this belief, Nature or landscape paintings act as a cultivation of intellect and humility, something beyond the realm of the human beings.

During the Koryo period (918–1392) in Korea, landscape painting emerged as an important art form. As a result of the cultural exchange between the Koryo dynasty and Song dynasty (960–1279) from China, the landscape paintings containing colossal mountains against the serene natural background slowly became popular in Korea. Two of the major schools of landscape painting were led by the 15th century court artist An Gyeon and master artist Chong Son. While Gyeon's masterpieces such as, "Dream Journey to the Peach Blossom Land", tend to offer a perspective of how the artists visualized the scenery in their minds rather than how it actually was, Chong Son specialized in "true-view" or realistic and intimate depiction of scenery.

== Buddhism and Korean art ==
From the 7th century till the 14th century, due to its significant influence on the Korean elite class, Buddhism remained the national religion of Korea. It was first introduced from China during the 4th century of the Three Kingdoms period (57 BC – 668 AD).

While the earlier Buddha and other deity statues from the 5th or 6th centuries reflect clear influence of Chinese stylistic features like the elongated face, strong facial features, folds of the garment, stiff, central poses, the usage of the lotus as a primary decoration on this wedding robe reflects the overall incorporation of Buddhist symbols in Korean art and the coexistence of Buddhist, Daoist, Shamanist, and Confucian motifs. During the 7th and 8th centuries, Korean Buddhist statues transformed both stylistically and conceptually. Later, as Jon Carter Covell pointed out, the figure of Bodhisattva, from the 13th and 14th centuries Korean art, popularly known as "Quan-Yin", can be seen as a harmony between East and West – Christianity and Buddhism, reflected in her healing willow branches in vase and a child on bended knee on the other side. This can be considered as one of the classic examples of influence of religion in Korean art.

Buddhist art represented both the religious intensity and the political motives of the ruling class of the time.
