= Kim Jong-seo =

Kim Jong-seo (Korean: 김종서) is a Korean name consisting of the family name Kim and the given name Jong-seo, and may also refer to:

- Kim Chongsŏ (1383 – 1453), also alternatively romanized as Kim Jong-seo, Joseon general and politician
- Kim Jong-seo (musician) (born 1965), South Korean musician
