= Han Yujoo =

South Korean writer (born 1982)

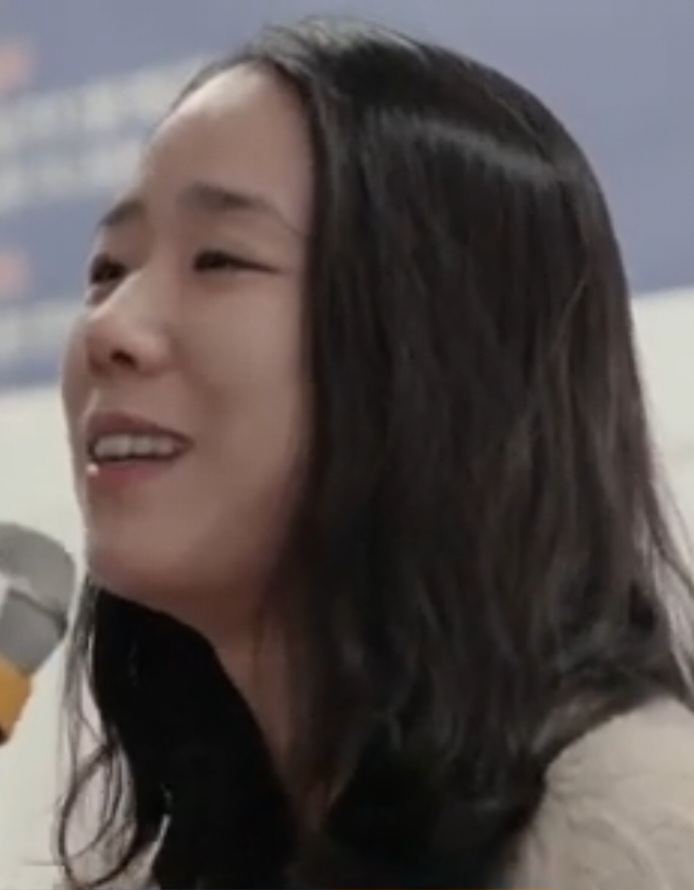

Han Yujoo (Korean: 한유주; born 1982) is a South Korean writer. Her novels portray not so much the fate of people embroiled in some kind of conflict as their psychological state when they contemplate a situation or idea. She focuses on recording spontaneous thoughts or flashbacks, rather than on describing something accurately or developing a dramatic arc. In this absence of a clear plot, the reading experience consists mostly of following the author's thought process. This is why Han's work can be considered an example of the French nouveau roman or antinovel.

== Life ==
Han Yujoo was born in 1982 in Seoul, South Korea. After graduating Dongdaejeon High School, she studied German language and literature at Hongik University and completed graduate-level coursework in Aesthetics at Seoul National University.

She began her writing career almost by chance. In her final year of high school, she submitted three or four applications to undergraduate programs, including Russian literature, that she supposed would allow her to read as much as possible. She finally chose to enroll in a German literature program. She read extensively, as she had expected, and her university life remained largely uneventful until she took an elective course in creative writing offered by the Korean literature department at her school. Without harboring literary ambitions anywhere as strong as the creative writing majors in her class, she wrote a short story entitled "Dalo" (달로 To the Moon) for her final project. She showed the story to a friend interested in literature, who encouraged her to send in the story to writing contests. She submitted it to a contest held by the literary journal Literature and Society and won, which officially marked her literary debut. She pursued her master's degree in her mid-twenties, during which she stayed in Paris for around five months.

Currently, she writes, translates, and teaches at a university. She is a member of Ru, an experimental writers' association, and is the founder of the publisher Oulipopress. She was briefly a member of the band The Chop, along with poets Kiwan Sung and Hwang Byungsng. In an interview at the 2016 Seoul International Writers' Festival, Han stated that her involvement with the band was so long ago she barely remembered it, and that she only participated in two shows. She did recall bringing an instrument she was not yet familiar with and performing poorly, having only agreed to perform because a literary colleague had reached out to her in need of a session musician.

In 2008 and 2012, she was funded by LTI Korea to partake in the Overseas Residency Program for Korean Writers in New York City and Provence, respectively. In 2013, she joined the Artience Residency offered by Arts Council Korea.

== Writing ==
Unlike some writers who receive critical and popular acclaim due to their exceptional narrative or character development, Han Yujoo intentionally veers away from standard practices in fiction writing and succeeds in creating a unique literary voice. Her work holds appeal for some readers and critics because she refuses to craft a meticulously structured narrative and does not attempt to produce memorable scenes through characters or events. In a favorable review of Han's experimental style, literary critic Hwang Ho-deok writes:

"But can there be a writer who does not want to write? Such a person is probably not a writer at all. Then what about writers who want to write about not writing? To tell a story about not telling one? There are some, if not many, writers like that right now. They write about action with no action, all the while attempting to erase even that writing itself. They jest that they deny their own being (and their writing); they have decided to become nothing. They are skeptical of the narrative, the message, and even meaning. The 'first to realize the futility of language,' they are the ones giving today's Korean literature a 'devastating brilliance.'"

Han's work has also received negative reviews. Some critics argue that her language is superfluous, her experiments derivative, and her works closer to miscellanies of essays rather than novels. It can be argued that Han Yujoo stands on the boundaries of linguistic experimentation that Korean literature is undergoing in the 21st century.

== Works ==
1. 『불가능한 동화』, 문학과지성사, 2013년, ISBN 9788932024097

The Impossible Fairy Tale. Moonji, 2013.

2. 『나의 왼손은 왕, 오른손은 왕의 필경사』, 문학과지성사, 2011년, ISBN 9788932022659

My Left Hand the King, and My Right the King's Scribe. Moonji, 2011.

3. 『얼음의 책』, 문학과지성사, 2009년, ISBN 9788932019604

Book of Ice. Moonji, 2009.

4. 『달로』, 문학과지성사, 2006년, ISBN 9788932016962

To the Moon. Moonji, 2006.

=== Works in translation (partial) ===
1. The Impossible Fairy Tale, translated by Janet Hong, Graywolf, 2017. Finalist for the 2018 PEN Translation Prize.

The Impossible Fairytale, Tilted Axis, 2017.

2. "When Translation Is an Impossible Fairy Tale", by Janet Hong.

3. "Seven People with the Same Name and Their Discrete Moments", translated by Erica Chung, Granta.

4. "Speeding Past", translated by Janet Hong.

5. "Lament", translated by Janet Hong, Words Without Borders

"From the Translator", by Janet Hong.

6. "Black-and-White Photographer", translated by Janet Hong, Asia Literary Review.

== Awards ==
1. 2003: 3rd New Writer's Award from Literature and Society for "Dalo" (달로 To the Moon)
2. 2009: 42nd Hankook Ilbo Literary Award for Eoreumui Chek (얼음의 책 Book of Ice)
3. 2015: Kim Hyeon Literary Award
