= Canvas of Blood =

Upcoming film by Jang Hoon

- Teaser poster
- Hangul: 몽유도원도
- RR: Mongyudowondo
- MR: Mongyudowŏndo
- Directed by: Jang Hoon
- Starring: Kim Nam-gil; Park Bo-gum; Lee Hyun-wook
- Production company: Doodoong Pictures
- Distributed by: Megabox Plus M
- Country: South Korea
- Language: Korean

Canvas of Blood (Korean: 몽유도원도) is an upcoming South Korean historical drama film directed by Jang Hoon starring Kim Nam-gil, Park Bo-gum, and Lee Hyun-wook. It will be released by Plus M Entertainment in South Korea in 2026.

== Premise ==
Set during the Joseon dynasty, the film centers around the painting Mongyudowondo commissioned by Grand Prince Anpyeong after he described a utopian landscape he saw in a dream. As the painting enchants, two royal brothers― Anpyeong and Grand Prince Suyang― find themselves chasing the throne with opposing dreams of power and paradise

== Cast ==
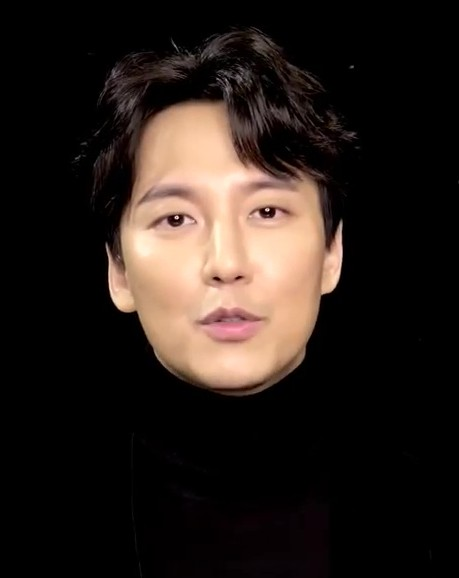
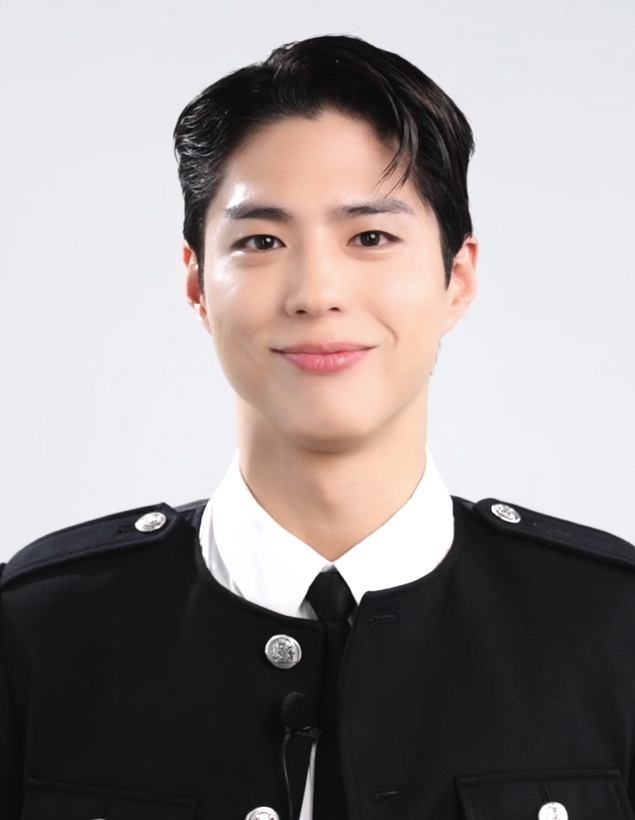
Kim Nam-gil (L) and Park Bo-gum play Grand Prince Suyang and Grand Prince Anpyeong respectively
- Kim Nam-gil as Grand Prince Suyang

The second son of King Sejong, he desires to be king and gradually becomes cruel as he realizes his younger brother Anpyeong's aspirations to be monarch. He gradually succumbs to his own ambitions and is tormented by doubts and anxieties about Anpyeong.

- Park Bo-gum as Grand Prince Anpyeong

The third son of King Sejong, he is a beloved prince who enjoys collecting works of art in addition to being an artist himself who is skilled in calligraphy, painting, and poetry. He is an idealist who stands up to his older brother, Suyang.

- Lee Hyun-wook as An Gyeon
- Park Won-sang
- Choi Deok-moon
- Ryu Seung-soo
- Cha Soon-bae
- Kim Tae-hoon
- Park Myung-hoon
- Kim Nam-hee

== Production ==
=== Development ===
In May 2025, Jang Hoon's follow-up film to A Taxi Driver (2017), then an untitled historical film, was one of the nine films granted by the Korean Film Council with financial support as part of their Mid-Budget Korean Film Production Support project.

==== Title ====
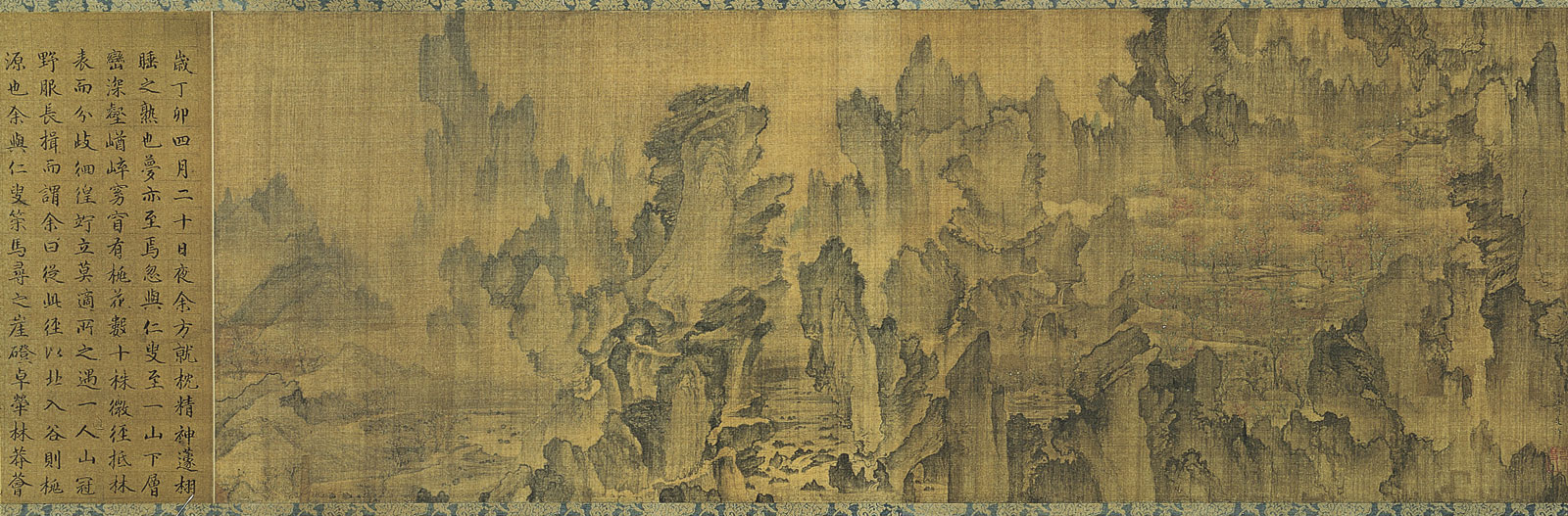
Dream Journey to the Peach Blossom Land (Korean: 몽유도원도, Mongyudowondo) painted in 1447

Canvas of Blood's Korean title Mongyudowondo (몽유도원도) refers to a painting created by artist An Gyeon and commissioned by Grand Prince Anpyeong after dreaming of utopia. The painting's literal translation in English is Dream Journey to the Peach Blossom Land.

=== Casting ===
In August 2025, actors Kim Nam-gil and Park Bo-gum were confirmed to star in the film. In October 2025, additional supporting cast members were announced including Lee Hyun-wook who will play the painter An Gyeong.

=== Filming ===
Principal photography began in mid-October 2025 and ended in January 2026.

== Marketing ==
The first stills of the film featuring Kim and Park were released in February 2026.

== Release ==
Canvas of Blood is slated for release in South Korea by Plus M Entertainment in 2026.
