= Lee Hyun-wook =

South Korean actor

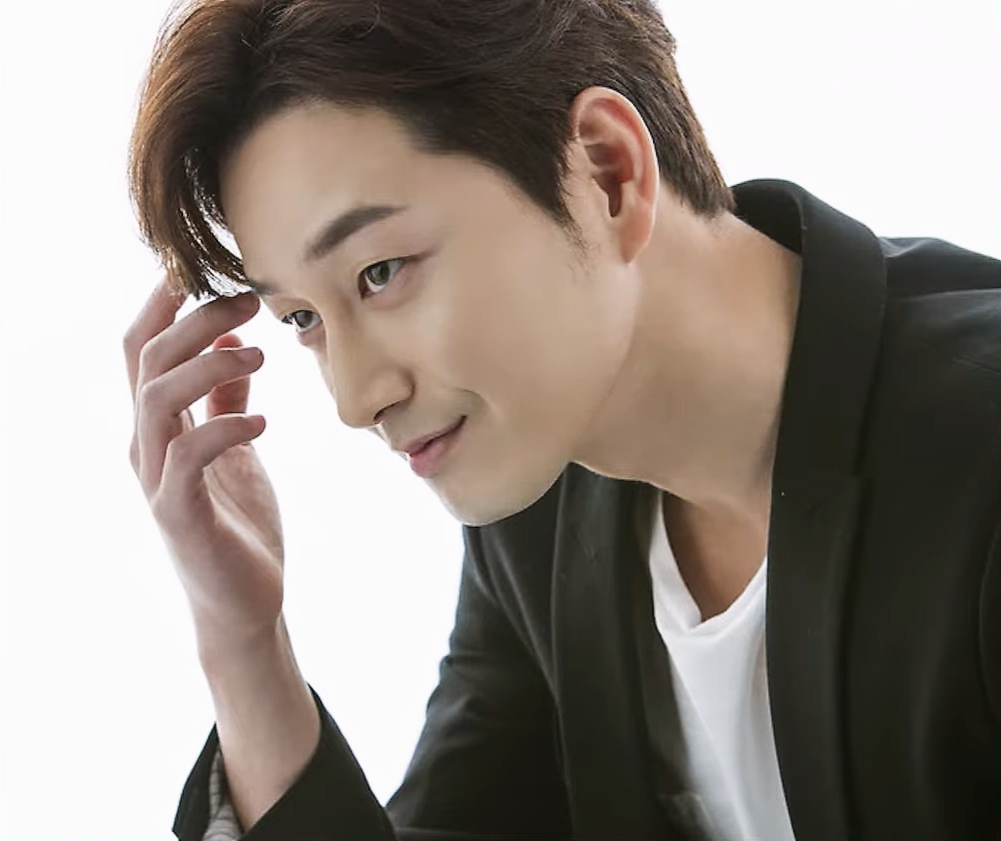
- Lee in 2021
- Born: June 17, 1985 (age 41); Icheon, Gyeonggi Province, South Korea
- Education: Korea National University of Arts
- Occupation: Actor
- Years active: 2000–present
- Agent: Gilstory Ent

Korean name
- Hangul: 이현욱
- Hanja: 李玹旭
- RR: I Hyeonuk
- MR: I Hyŏnuk
- Website: gilstoryent.com/ko/artist_leehyunwook.php

Lee Hyun-wook (Korean: 이현욱; born June 17, 1985) is a South Korean actor. He is best known for his roles in the television series Hell Is Other People (2019), Mine (2021), and Remarriage & Desires (2022).

== Early life and education ==
Lee became interested in acting when he was in middle school. His parents were against it but his grandmother helped him enroll in an acting academy. He graduated from Anyang Arts High School and Korea National University of Arts.

== Career ==
Lee Hyun-wook started his acting career playing in short films: Repatriation (2000), The Camel (2008), Thorn Hearted (2010) and The Out Boxer (2011). The latter earned him the Face in Shorts Award at the 10th Asiana International Short Film Festival in 2012. In 2013, Lee was appointed special jury member of the 11th Asiana International Short Film Festival alongside Lee Jung-jae. In 2014, Lee made his television debut in the action-thriller series Three Days as the right-hand man of Choi Won-young's character. Two months later, he made his commercial film debut in The Target which was screened at the 2014 Cannes Film Festival. The same year, he was chosen among 400 candidates to play Choi Yoo-bin in the daily drama Only Love.

In 2015, Lee made his theater debut in True West, playing the main character Austin. He reprised his role the following year before playing Stephen in Old Wicked Songs. His performance earned him the New Actor Award at the 2016 Stagetalk Audience Choice Awards. The same year, he took on the role of a detective in the crime television series Mrs. Cop 2 and appeared in the film No Tomorrow. In 2017, Lee played Min-wook in the play Judo Boy. The same year, he played two brothers in the web series Fake. In May 2018, Lee signed an exclusive contract with Management Air. In October 2018, he started playing Bob in Toc Toc, a role which he reprised in September 2019 for a two-day performance in Gunpo. In 2019, Lee played Oliver in the play The Pride. He was also cast as a resident of Eden Dormitory in the psychological thriller Hell Is Other People, making it his first small screen role since his military discharge and for which he was nominated in the Capability Award category at the 1st OCN Awards. Later that year, he made a guest appearance in the tenth episode of Pegasus Market which stars his close friend Lee Dong-hwi.

In 2020, Lee appeared in the films Secret Zoo and #Alive. He then played a missionary in the first three episodes of The Good Detective. He was also cast in his first main role in a television series, playing a lieutenant in the military thriller Search. In 2021, Lee starred in the romantic-comedy She Would Never Know alongside Won Jin-ah and Rowoon. He also starred in the highly anticipated tvN drama Mine as the husband of actress Lee Bo-young's character. He also appeared in the TVING Original movie Shark: The Beginning as Hyun Woo-yong and will reprise his role in the follow-up web series, Shark: The Storm. At the 58th Baeksang Arts Awards, Lee was nominated for Best Supporting Actor in a Korean drama for his role as Han Ji-yong in Mine. In 2022, Lee starred in the Netflix original series Remarriage & Desires as one of the main characters.

In 2025, he starred in TvN's historical melodrama The Queen Who Crowns wherein he portrayed Lee Bang-won, Queen Wongyeong's husband and the third king of Joseon.

== Filmography ==
Key
†	Denotes films that have not yet been released

=== Film ===
Year	Title	Role	Notes	Ref.
2000	Repatriation		Short film	
2008	The Camel	Kang-seok	Short film	
2010	Thorn Hearted	Man	Short film	
2011	The Out Boxer	Sang-kyo	Short film	
2014	The Target	Jo Sang-woo		
2016	No Tomorrow	Seok-hoon		
2020	Secret Zoo	Min Chul-hyun	Cameo	
2020	#Alive	Lee Sang-chul		
2021	Shark: The Beginning	Hyun Woo-yong	Cameo	
2022	The Policeman's Lineage	Kim Jeong-gyun		
2024	The Plot	Wol-cheon		
TBA	Canvas of Blood †	An Gyeong		

=== Television series ===
Year	Title	Role	Notes	Ref.
2014	Three Days	Kim Do-jin's right-hand man		
2014	Only Love	Choi Yoo-bin		
2016	Mrs. Cop 2	Detective		
2019	Hell Is Other People	Yoo Gi-hyuk		
2019	Pegasus Market	DM Group psychiatrist	Guest (Episode 10)	
2020	The Good Detective	Park Gun-ho	Guest (Episodes 1-4)	
2020	Search	Lee Joon-sung		
2021	She Would Never Know	Lee Jae-shin		
2021	Mine	Han Ji-yong		
2022	Remarriage & Desires	Lee Hyeong-joo		
2023	Song of the Bandits	Lee Kwang-il		
2025	The Queen Who Crowns	Taejong Yi Bang-won		
2025	Shark: The Storm	Hyun Woo-yong	Follow-up drama to the movie Shark: The Beginning	
2026	Boyfriend on Demand	a prosecutor	Cameo	
2026	Gold Land	Lee Do-kyung		
2026	Sword & Silence †	Kim Beom-min		

=== Web series ===
Year	Title	Role	Notes	Ref.
2017	Fake	Kim Geun-ho / Kim Geun-bae		

== Stage ==
Theater play performances of Lee
Year	Title		Role	Venue	Date	Ref.
Year	English	Korean	Role	Venue	Date	Ref.
2015	True West	트루웨스트	Austin	Shinyeon Art Hall	August 13 – November 1, 2015	
2016	True West Returns	트루웨스트 리턴즈	Austin	Yegreen Theater	June 24 – August 28, 2016	
2016	Old Wicked Songs	올드위키드송	Stephen	Dongsung Art Center	September 21 – October 23, 2016	
2016-2017	Old Wicked Songs	올드위키드송	Stephen	Daehak-ro Dream Art Centre 1	November 8 - January 22	
2017	Judo Boy	유도소년	Min-wook	Suhyeon Theater	March 4 – May 14, 2017	
2019	Toc Toc	톡톡	Bob	Daehangno TOM Theater	October 27, 2018 – February 10, 2019	
2019	The Pride	프라이드	Oliver	Seoul Art One Theater	May 25 – August 25, 2019	
2019	Toc Toc	톡톡	Bob	Gunpo Culture and Arts Center Azalea Hall	September 27–28, 2019	

== Awards and nominations ==
Name of the award ceremony, year presented, category, nominee of the award, and the result of the nomination
Award ceremony	Year	Category	Nominee / Work	Result	Ref.
Asiana International Short Film Festival	2012	Face in Shorts Award	The Out Boxer	Won	
Baeksang Arts Awards	2022	Best Supporting Actor – Television	Mine	Nominated	
OCN Awards	2019	The Capability Award	Hell Is Other People	Nominated	
Stagetalk Audience Choice Awards	2016	New Actor Award	Old Wicked Songs, True West Returns	Won	
