= Sin Kwangsu =

Korean poet (1712–1775)

- Hangul: 신광수
- Hanja: 申光洙
- RR: Sin Gwangsu
- MR: Sin Kwangsu

Art name
- Hangul: 석북, 오악산인
- Hanja: 石北, 五嶽山人
- RR: Seokbuk, Oaksanin
- MR: Sŏkpuk, Oaksanin

Courtesy name
- Hangul: 성연
- Hanja: 聖淵
- RR: Seongyeon
- MR: Sŏngyŏn

Sin Kwangsu (Korean: 신광수; Hanja: 申光洙; 1712–1775) was a poet of the late Joseon Dynasty. Living in the time of King Yeongjo, he was unable to attain a position of rank because his family was aligned with the Southerners faction. He married the daughter of Yun Tusŏ and became associated with Silhak. At 39, Sin finally passed the higher exam of the kwagŏ and was sent to Jeju Island as an official. He wrote a description of the island. His famed words from later life include the Kwan sang yung ma (관산융마; 關山戎馬) and Kwansŏ akbu (관서악부; 關西樂府).

== See also ==
- Korean literature
- List of Joseon Dynasty people
