= Remarriage & Desires =

2022 South Korean television series

- Promotional poster
- Also known as: The Bride of Black
- Hangul: 블랙의 신부
- Hanja: 블랙의 新婦
- Lit.: Black Bride
- RR: Beullaegui sinbu
- MR: Pŭllaegŭi sinbu
- Genre: Drama; Satire; Revenge
- Developed by: Netflix
- Written by: Lee Geun-yeong
- Directed by: Kim Jeong-min
- Starring: Kim Hee-sun; Lee Hyun-wook; Jung Yoo-jin; Cha Ji-yeon; Park Hoon
- Music by: Kim Jang-woo
- Country of origin: South Korea
- Original language: Korean
- No. of episodes: 8

Production
- Executive producers: Shin-cheol; Choi Jun-seok
- Producers: Kim Young-seop; Jeon Sang-kyun; Kim Dong Guk
- Running time: 55–71 minutes
- Production companies: Image9 Tiger; Tiger Studio

Original release
- Network: Netflix
- Release: July 15, 2022

Remarriage & Desires (Korean: 블랙의 신부) is a 2022 South Korean television series directed by Kim Jeong-min and starring Kim Hee-sun, Lee Hyun-wook, Cha Ji-yeon, Jung Yoo-jin, and Park Hoon. This series is a satire on the Korean society that tells the desire in the remarriage market, revolving around upper-class marriage information companies. It was released on Netflix on July 15, 2022.

== Synopsis ==
Seo Hye-seung who lost everything in an instant after living as a middle-class housewife in Gangnam, reunites with the woman who upended her life at Rex, a marriage information company for the upper class, and participates in the race of her desires for her revenge.

== Cast ==
=== Main ===
- Kim Hee-sun as Seo Hye-seung, a teacher in Gangnam.
- Lee Hyun-wook as Lee Hyeong-joo, a venture company executive.
- Jung Yoo-jin as Jin Yoo-hee, a lawyer at a large corporation with a desire to become the top class.
- Cha Ji-yeon as Choi Yoo-seon, a representative of Rex, the country's top-class professional marriage company.
- Park Hoon as Cha Seok-jin, a professor who has a conflict with Choi Yoo-seon over his father's enormous fortune.

=== Supporting ===
- Park Sang-hoon as Lee Jun-ho, son of Lee Hyeong-joo.
- Kim Sa-kwon as Joo Ho-chan, Lee Hyeong-joo's friends
- Lady Jane as station announcer
- Kim Mi-kyung as Lee Hyeong-joo's mother
- Kim Young-hoon as Choi Seong-jae, President of a leading game company.
- Kim So-ra as Prof. Jung Mi-jin, University professor
- Kim Yoon-seo as Heo Jung-in, Lee Hyung-joo's ex wife
- Kim Seon-kyung as Sec. Go Ae-ran, secretary of the Blue House
- Lee Doo-seok as Prof. Park Jin-hwan
- Baek Joo-hee as Ha Yeong-seo
- Baek Seung-hee as Han Jung-ok
- Jung Woo-hyuk as Engr. Ryu Won-ho
- Yang Mal-bok as Min Na-rae

=== Special appearance ===
- Park Ji-hoon as one of Choi Yoo-seon's customers

== Production ==
=== Development ===
On July 21, 2021, Netflix confirmed through a press release the production of Korean original series Remarriage & Desires, a satire on Korean society in which people hope to upgrade their status by marrying or remarrying into the ranks of the elite. Netflix further revealed that the series to be directed by Kim Jung-min, written by Lee Geun-yeong and produced by Image9 Communications and Tiger Studio, will have cast of Kim Hee-seon, Lee Hyun-wook, Jung Yu-jin, Park Hoon and Cha Ji-yeon.

=== Casting ===
In July casting in the series was confirmed by Kim Hee-sun, Lee Hyeon-wook, Jung Yu-jin, Park Hoon and Cha Ji-yeon.

=== Filming ===
Filming began on July 25, 2021 after script reading on the 6th.

== Reception ==
On the review aggregator website Rotten Tomatoes, 83% of 6 critics' reviews are positive, with an average rating of 6.4/10.

Pierce Conran of the South China Morning Post rated the series with 2.5 out of 5 stars and praising the performance of Jung Eugene wrote, "Jung Eugene stands out for her delivery of cold, calculating evil." Conran also appreciated the cinematographer Jo Yeon-soo, writing, "Jo Yeon-soo draws notice for his smooth camerawork." Summarising Conran wrote, "For a show that's less than half the length of other primetime soaps, what's immediately apparent about Remarriage & Desires is how slow the build-up of the story is and how listless it remains until the final couple of episodes."
