= Sŏng Sŭng =

Korean scholar-politician (d. 1456)

- Hangul: 성승
- Hanja: 成勝
- RR: Seong Seung
- MR: Sŏng Sŭng

Art name
- Hangul: 적곡
- Hanja: 赤谷
- RR: Jeokgok
- MR: Chŏkkok

Posthumous name
- Hangul: 충숙
- Hanja: 忠肅
- RR: Chungsuk
- MR: Ch'ungsuk

General Sŏng Sŭng (Korean: 성승; Hanja: 成勝 ? – 1456) was a Korean Joseon Dynasty politician and soldier. His art name was Chŏkkok, and he was the father of Sŏng Sammun. Involved in his son's plot to overthrow King Sejo and restore his nephew King Danjong to the throne, he was caught and executed. He would later be exonerated in 1784 and given the posthumous name of Ch'ungsuk.

== See also ==
- Sejo of Joseon
- Six martyred ministers
- Saengyukshin
- Sŏng Sammun
