= Search (South Korean TV series) =

2020 South Korean mystery TV series

- Promotional poster
- Hangul: 써치
- RR: Sseochi
- MR: Ssŏch'i
- Genre: Mystery; Thriller
- Created by: OCN Studio
- Written by: Goo Mo; Go Myung-joo
- Directed by: Lim Dae-woong; Myung Hyun-woo
- Starring: Jang Dong-yoon; Krystal Jung; Moon Jeong-hee; Yoon Park; Lee Hyun-wook
- Country of origin: South Korea
- Original language: Korean
- No. of episodes: 10

Production
- Running time: 60 minutes
- Production companies: GlowFly Pictures; OCN Studio

Original release
- Network: OCN
- Release: October 17 – November 15, 2020

Search (Korean: 써치) is a South Korean television series starring Jang Dong-yoon, Krystal Jung, Moon Jeong-hee, Yoon Park and Lee Hyun-wook. It follows the story of the ruthless attack of an unknown creature in the Korean Demilitarized Zone, and the search operation of elite special force to uncover the truth. It aired on OCN from October 17 to November 15, 2020, every Saturday and Sunday at 22:30 (KST). The series is available for streaming with multi-languages subtitles on iQIYI in South East Asia, Hong Kong, Macau and Taiwan.

== Synopsis ==
Search is a military thriller drama which takes place in the demilitarized zone (DMZ) and tells the story of a specialized search party that forms to uncover the truth behind a mysterious disappearance and murder cases.

== Cast and characters ==
=== Main ===
- Jang Dong-yoon as Yong Dong-jin

Yong Dong-jin is a sergeant and special military dog handler who follows the traces of the enemy. He was selected as the first soldier of the army's elite warrior in the search battalion, and is currently waiting for the date of his discharge. Before receiving the national call, he also had a history of volunteering abroad at a Korean-American animal protection group on the veterinary road. When it is decided to send a reconnaissance and pursuit dog to the Choi Jeong-ye special lease, he joins the search team as the youngest member. He is in charge of Korea's best military dog.

- Krystal Jung as Son Ye-rim

First Lieutenant Son Ye-rim is a senior lieutenant and an elite officer from the Women's University School Corps, and is currently an officer at the KCST Command Center. As a school district candidate, she ranked first in the appointment grade with her superior skills. She was the first to be put into service when a situation occurred in the DMZ GP. At the special assignment, where she joins as a special officer, she meets her ex-boyfriend Yong Dong-jin again.

- Moon Jeong-hee as Kim Da-jeong

Kim Da-jeong is a special officer who protects the DMZ. She is the former Team Leader of the Special Forces' 709 Special Squadron Women's Company anti-terrorism unit and is currently the contract commentator at the DMZ Memorial Hall. She has a husband and a daughter, and they live together in Chengong-ri, the only civilian-occupied village within the DMZ. However, when an incident occurs near the DMZ, Da-jeong was keen to protect her family and the villagers.

- Yoon Park as Song Min-gyu

Captain Song Min-gyu is Hwasaeng Defense Command's best elite officer with full specs. He was scheduled to be appointed as an operation officer at the headquarters of the Army after passing the rank of major with the highest rating, but becoming a military prosecutor suspect who is caught in an unsavory case and undergoes military trial. On the way of life and death, Song is selected as the leader of the North Star and gets the last chance. To get out of the crisis, he must succeed in this operation, but he has another reason to return to the demilitarized zone.

- Lee Hyun-wook as Lee Joon-sung

First Lieutenant Lee Joon-sung is affiliated with a commando regiment that conducts special warfare directly under the command corps. While attending university, he was transferred to the military academy and received the Presidential Award. A case breaks out in the DMZ, and he is selected as the deputy team leader of the special mission team. He unites the special lease into one with his unique gentle leadership, but engages in a subtle nervous war with Captain Song, who focuses only on the success of the operation.

=== Supporting ===
Special Polaris Mission Unit

- Lee Ha-yul as Park Ki-hyung

Sergeant First Class Park Ki-hyung is an active duty sergeant who is the third generation soldier in his family. He was supposed to get married but was assigned to the operation in the DMZ as a sniper.

- Choi Yoon-je as Staff Sergeant Ju Moon-chul

1997 Operation of the DMZ

- Yoo Sung-joo as Lee Hyuk

Chairman of the National Defense Commission and a National Assemblyman. He is running for the presidential elections.

- Choi Deok-moon as Han Dae-sik

Commander of the Armed Forces of the Ministry of Defense of the Republic of Korea. He has risen to the present position by surviving a gunfight with the North Korean military in the DMZ in 1997, but suffers from post-traumatic stress disorder due to the shock of that accident. When a situation arises in the DMZ, he instructs Captain Song on a secret mission.

- Yeon Woo-jin as Captain Jo Min-gook

Commander of the 1997 Search Operation in the DMZ.

Chengong-ri village people

- Lee Soon-won as Chun Min-jae, Da-jeong's husband and Su-yeong's father.
- Park Da-yeon as Chun Su-yeong, Da-jeong and Min-jae's 10-year-old daughter. A cheerful girl who is good at running and likes Sergeant Yong Dong-jin very much.
- Kim In-woo as Director Baek, the director of Chengong-ri Health Center.
- Min Chae-yeon as Nurse Chae

Others

- Kim Ho-jung as Yong Hee-ra, Yong Dong-jin's mother, she runs a restaurant.
- Yoon Young-min as Lab Director Moon Ji-won, researcher at the KCST Command Center.

== Production ==
=== Development ===
On October 25, 2019, OCN's marketing chief Choi Kyung-joo announced during the channel's "Thriller House" press conference that Search would be among the 11 television series which would air in 2020. Search is the fourth installment of OCN's "Dramatic Cinema" project (which combines film and drama formats), following Trap (2019), Hell Is Other People (2019) and Team Bulldog: Off-Duty Investigation (2020). It is also the first project of its newly launched OCN Studio division and South Korea's first military thriller drama set in the Korean Demilitarized Zone.

=== Casting ===
On November 29, 2019, it was reported that Jang Dong-yoon had been offered the role of Yong Dong-jin. On January 16, 2020, Krystal Jung and her agency SM Entertainment confirmed that she would play Son Ye-rim. Moon Jeong-hee officially joined the main cast on January 30. On February 13, OCN confirmed the series' final lineup with the addiction of Yoon Park and Lee Hyun-wook. The first script reading took place in April 2020.

=== Filming ===
The series is entirely pre-produced; filming was completed in August 2020. According to director Lim Dae-woong, actors playing soldiers filmed some scenes with "over 20 kilograms of military gear on" in midsummer. Lim also mentioned that "real newspaper articles and news broadcasts" were sometimes used during filming, and that they "tried to make the clothes and equipment realistic too" though they could not "actually go [to the DMZ] to film."

== Release ==
The first teaser, featuring Jang Dong-yoon and Krystal Jung, was released on April 27, 2020. On September 14, OCN released two posters featuring the main cast and the phrase "a fear that no one has ever seen," which announced that the series would premiere on October 17.

== Viewership ==
Search : South Korea viewers per episode (thousands)

| Season | Episode number | | | | | | | | | | Average |
| Season | 1 | 2 | 3 | 4 | 5 | 6 | 7 | 8 | 9 | 10 | Average |
|---|---|---|---|---|---|---|---|---|---|---|---|
| 1 | 791 | 886 | 675 | 901 | 808 | 1095 | 828 | 1015 | 993 | 1065 | 906 |

Source: Audience measurement performed nationwide by Nielsen Korea.

Average TV viewership ratings
| Ep. | Original broadcast date | Average audience share (Nielsen Korea) | |
| Ep. | Original broadcast date | Nationwide | Seoul |
|---|---|---|---|
| 1 | October 17, 2020 | 2.640% (4th) | 2.408% (4th) |
| 2 | October 18, 2020 | 3.115% (3rd) | 3.247% (3rd) |
| 3 | October 24, 2020 | 2.280% (4th) | 2.299% (6th) |
| 4 | October 25, 2020 | 2.881% (3rd) | 3.135% (3rd) |
| 5 | October 31, 2020 | 3.347% (3rd) | 3.679% (3rd) |
| 6 | November 1, 2020 | 3.919% (3rd) | 4.336% (2nd) |
| 7 | November 7, 2020 | 3.018% (5th) | 2.988% (6th) |
| 8 | November 8, 2020 | 3.532% (5th) | 3.877% (3rd) |
| 9 | November 14, 2020 | 3.575% (4th) | 3.816% (3rd) |
| 10 | November 15, 2020 | 3.922% (3rd) | 3.693% (3rd) |
| Average | | 3.223% | 3.348% |
In the table above, the blue numbers represent the lowest ratings and the red numbers represent the highest ratings.; This drama airs on a cable channel/pay TV which normally has a relatively smaller audience compared to free-to-air TV/public broadcasters (KBS, SBS, MBC and EBS).
