= Sŏng Sammun =

Joseon scholar-official (1418–1456)

- Hangul: 성삼문
- Hanja: 成三問
- RR: Seong Sammun
- MR: Sŏng Sammun

Art name
- Hangul: 매죽헌
- Hanja: 梅竹軒
- RR: Maejukheon
- MR: Maejukhŏn

Courtesy name
- Hangul: 근보, 눌옹
- Hanja: 謹甫, 訥翁
- RR: Geunbo, Nulong
- MR: Kŭnbo, Nurong

Sammun Seong (Korean: 성삼문; Hanja: 成三問; 1418 – June 8, 1456) was a scholar-official of the early Joseon period who rose to prominence in the court of King Sejong the Great (r. 1418–1450). He was executed after being implicated in a plot to dethrone King Sejo (r. 1455–1468) and restore his predecessor King Danjong (r. 1452–1455), and is known as one of the sayuksin (사육신, the six martyred ministers) with reference to this plot.

== Biography ==
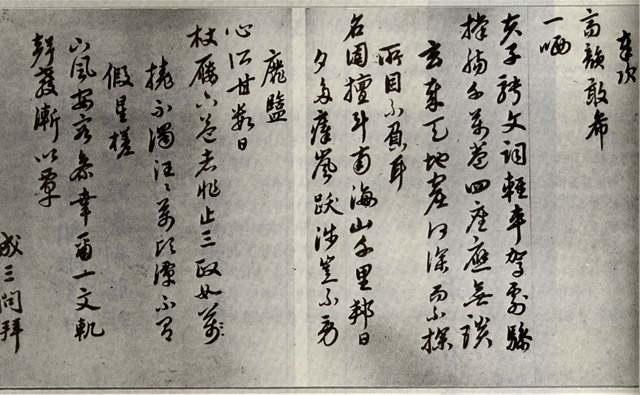
A calligraphic work written by Sŏng Sammun

Sŏng was born in Hongseong (then Hongju), South Chungcheong Province to a yangban family of the Changnyeong Sŏng clan (창녕 성씨; 昌寧 成氏). He passed the lower examination at the regular triennial administration in 1438. He soon gained the favor of King Sejong, and was appointed to the Hall of Worthies. From 1442 to 1446, he cooperated with other members of that body to compose the Hunminjeongeum, in which the hangul alphabet was first presented to the world. The level of his involvement in the creation of the Korean alphabet Hangul (and that of other Hall of Worthies scholars) is disputed, although he and other scholars were sent on trips to consult with a Ming Chinese phoneticist several times, presumably because one of the first uses the new alphabet was put to was to transcribe the sounds of hanja, or Sino-Korean characters. In 1447, Sŏng achieved the highest score on the higher literary examination.

In 1455, Prince Suyang (one of Sejong's sons) forced the young King Danjong, his nephew, to abdicate, taking the throne instead as King Sejo. Following secret orders from his father Sŏng Sŭng, Sŏng Sammun along with Pak Chungnim, Pak P'aengnyŏn and others plotted to assassinate the new king and restore King Danjong to the throne. The plot was exposed and the plotters all arrested. Sammun and his father were executed along with other plotters. Before his execution, Sammun condemned the king as a pretender. The sayuksin and the saengyuksin (생육신, the six retainers who lived), who refused to accept King Sejo as the legitimate king, were praised by later generations for holding fast to the Confucian value of staying loyal to the true king.

== Poems for his loyalty ==
He made several poems during imprisonment and before his execution. The following is his death poem.

擊鼓催人命 (격고최인명) -둥둥 북소리는 내 생명을 재촉하고,

回頭日欲斜 (회두일욕사) -머리를 돌여 보니 해는 서산으로 넘어 가려고 하는구나

黃泉無一店 (황천무일점) -황천으로 가는 길에는 주막조차 없다는데,

今夜宿誰家 (금야숙수가) -오늘밤은 뉘 집에서 잠을 자고 갈거나

As the sound of drum calls for my life,

I turn my head where the sun is about to set.

In the afterlife, there is not a single inn

This night, at whose house shall I rest ?

Another poem in prison written in sijo format

Old Korean	Translation
이 몸이 주거 가서 무어시 될고 하니,	What shall I become after death?
봉래산(蓬萊山) 제일봉(第一峯)에 낙락장송(落落長松) 되야 이셔,	A tall, thick pine tree on the highest peak of Mount Penglai,
백설(白雪)이 만건곤(滿乾坤)할 제 독야청청(獨也靑靑) 하리라.	Evergreen alone when white snow covers the whole world.

Another poem (using 7 words in each line)

Hanja	Eumdok	Modern Korean	Translation
食人之食衣人衣	식인지식의인의	임의 밥 임의 옷을 먹고 입으며	I've eaten food and worn clothes my lord has given,
素志平生莫有違	소지평생막유위	일평생 먹은 마음 변할 줄이 있으랴	How could there be change in the steadfast heart?
一死固知忠義在	일사고지충의재	이 죽음이 충과 의를 위함이기에	My death is for loyalty and righteousness.
顯陵松栢夢依依	현릉송백몽의의	현릉 푸른 송백꿈 속에서도 못잊져라	How could I forget even in a dream with the green pine tree by Heonreung

== Family ==
- Father
  - Sŏng Sŭng (성승; 成勝; ? – 8 June 1456)
- Mother
  - Lady Pak of the Juksan Pak clan (죽산 박씨)
  - Unnamed stepmother of commoner status
- Siblings
  - Younger brother – Sŏng Sambing (성삼빙; 成三聘; ?–1456)
  - Younger brother – Sŏng Samgo (성삼고(成三顧; ?–1456)
  - Younger brother – Sŏng Samsŏng (성삼성; 成三省; ?–1456)
  - Younger half-sister – Sŏng Sŏnggŭm (성성금; 成性今), Lady Seong
  - Younger half-sister – Sŏng Okdong (성옥동; 成玉童), Lady Seong
- Wives and their children
  - Lady Sin of the Aju Sin clan (아주 신씨; 鵝洲 申氏) — no issue.
  - Kim Ch'a-san (김차산; 金次山), Lady Kim of the Yonan Kim clan (연안 김씨; 延安 金氏)
    - Son – Sŏng Maengch'ŏm (성맹첨; 成孟瞻; ?–1456)
    - Son – Sŏng Maengnyŏn (성맹년; ?–1456)
    - Daughter – Sŏng Hyo'ok (성효옥), Lady Seong
    - Daughter – Lady Sŏng (성씨; 成氏; 1439–1489)
    - Daughter – Lady Sŏng (성씨; 成氏)
    - Son – Sŏng Hŏn (성헌)
    - Son – Sŏng T'aek (성택)

== In popular culture ==
- Portrayed by Hyun Woo in the 2011 SBS TV series Deep Rooted Tree.

== See also ==
- Joseon Dynasty politics
- History of Korea
- List of Joseon Dynasty people
