= Grand Prince Anpyeong =

Korean prince (1418–1453)

Grand Prince Anpyeong 안평대군
- Born: October 27, 1418
- Died: November 27, 1453 (aged 35)
- Clan: Jeonju Yi
- Father: Sejong of Joseon
- Mother: Queen Soheon

- Korean name
- Hangul: 이용
- Hanja: 李瑢
- RR: I Yong
- MR: I Yong

Royal title
- Hangul: 안평대군
- Hanja: 安平大君
- RR: Anpyeong daegun
- MR: Anp'yŏng taegun

Grand Prince Anpyeong (Korean: 안평대군; Hanja: 安平大君 李瑢; October 27, 1418 – November 27, 1453), personal name Yi Yong (Korean: 이용; Hanja: 李瑢), was a prince of the Joseon Dynasty. A calligrapher, poet, and painter, he was the third eldest son of King Sejong and Queen Soheon.

== Life ==
Grand Prince Anpyeong was born in 1418, the year of King Sejong's accession to the throne. His courtesy name was Cheongji (淸之), his pen names were Biheodang (匪懈堂), Nanggan Geosa (琅玕居士), and Maejukheon (梅竹軒).

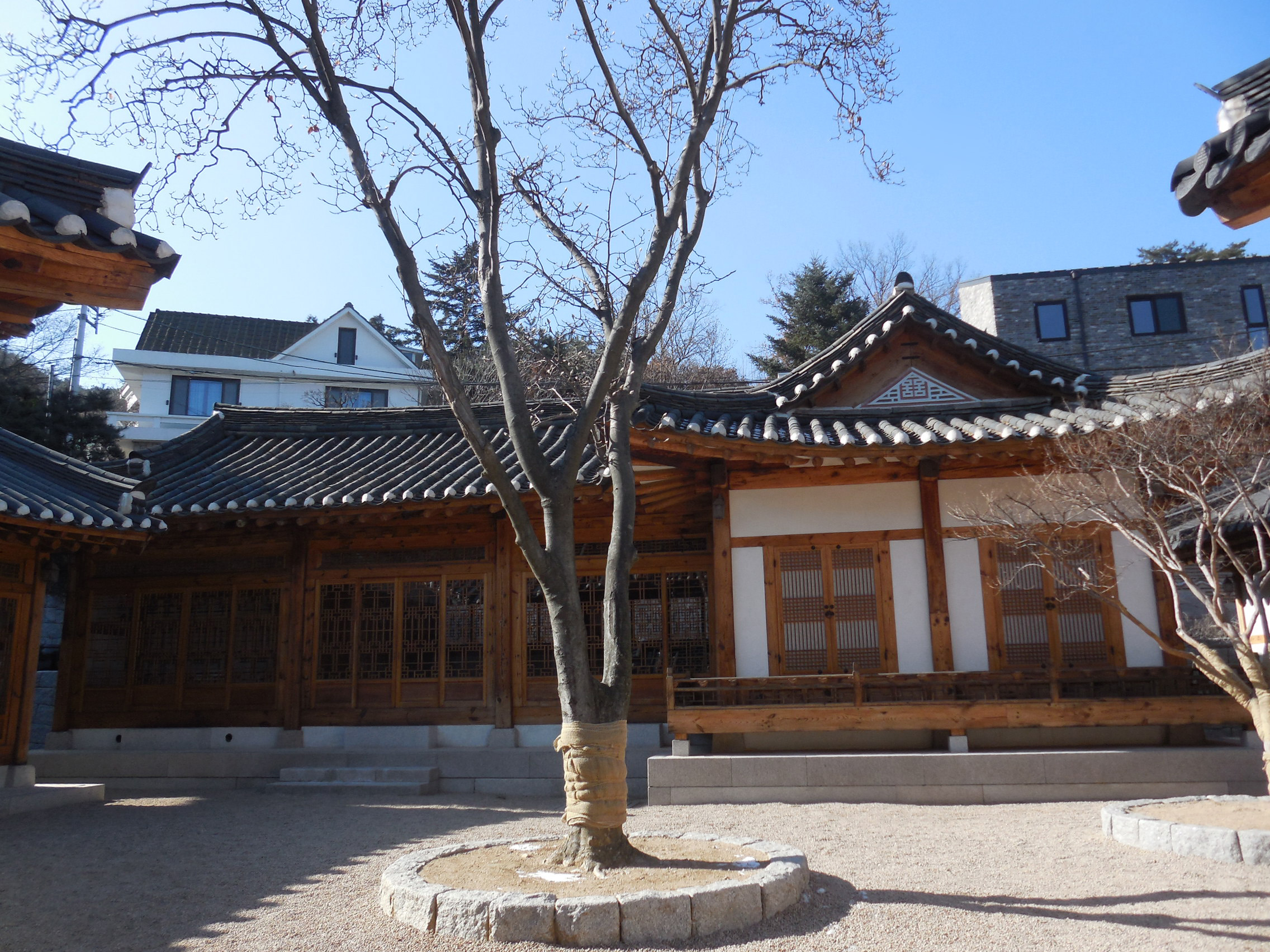
Mugyewon, known as Mugaejeongsa, is the site of Grand Prince Anpyeong's villa which was designated as Tangible Cultural Property No. 22 of Seoul on January 15, 1974

In 1428, he was granted the title of Grand Prince Anpyeong (安平大君) and in 1430, he entered Sungkyunkwan with several other princes to study. He became the adoptive grandson of his uncle, Prince Seongnyeong (誠寧大君) in 1431.

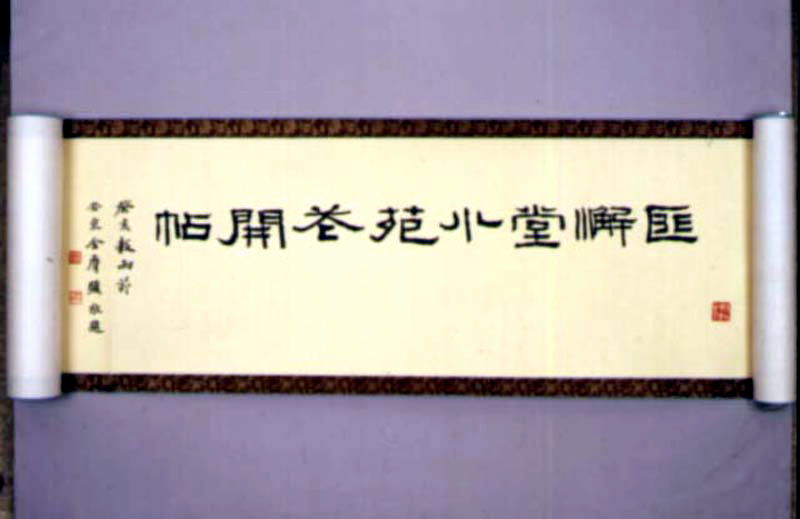
Calligraphy by Grand Prince Anpyeong which is designated as one of the National Treasures of South Korea

In 1447, he commissioned the painting Mongyudowondo (몽유도원도) from artist An Gyeon after dreaming of utopia. The painting's literal translation in English is Dream Journey to the Peach Blossom Land.

In 1453, the first year of King Danjong's reign, he was executed by his second older brother, Grand Prince Suyang, along with Kim Jong-seo and Hwangbo In, for plotting a coup. He was later reinstated during the reign of King Sukjong. His posthumous name was Jang So (章昭).

== Ancestry ==
- Paternal grandfather: King Taejong (太宗, 1367–1422)
- Paternal grandmother: Queen Won-gyeong of the Min clan (1365–1420)
- Maternal grandfather: Shim On (沈溫, 1375–1418)
- Maternal grandmother: Lady Samhan of the Sunheung Ahn clan (? –1444)
- Father: Sejong the Great of Joseon (세종대왕; 15 May 1397–8 April 1450)
- Mother: Queen Soheon of the Cheongsong Sim clan (소헌왕후 심씨; 12 October 1395–19 April 1446)
  - Older sister: Princess Jeongso (정소공주; 1412–1424)
  - Older brother: Yi Hyang, King Munjong (왕세자 향; 15 November 1414–1 June 1452)
  - Older sister: Princess Jeongui (정의공주; 1415–11 February 1477)
  - Older brother: Yi Yu, King Sejo (이유 수양대군; 2 November 1417–23 September 1468)
  - Younger brother: Yi Ku (이구; 7 January 1420–21 January 1469)
  - Younger brother: Yi Yeo, Grand Prince Gwangpyeong (이여 광평대군; 2 May 1425–7 December 1444)
  - Younger brother: Yi Yu, Grand Prince Geumseong (이유 금성대군; 5 May 1426–7 November 1457)
  - Younger brother: Yi Im, Grand Prince Pyeongwon (이임 평원대군; 18 November 1427–16 January 1445)
  - Younger brother: Yi Yeom, Grand Prince Yeongeung (이염 영응대군; 23 May 1434–2 February 1467)
- Consort: Lady Jeong Yeon-il (迎日 鄭氏, ?—1453), daughter of Left State Councillor Jeong Yeon (鄭淵, 1389—1444)

== In popular culture ==
=== Television ===
- Portrayed by Im Dong-jin in the The King and the Queen (1998–2000)
- Portrayed by Hah Shih-hoon in The Great King, Sejong (2008)
- Portrayed by Lee Joo-seok in The Princess' Man (2011)
- Portrayed by Lee Kwang-ki in Insu, the Queen Mother (2011)

=== Film ===
- Portrayed by Yoon Jung-il in The King's Letters (2019)
- Portrayed by Park Bo-gum in Canvas of Blood (2026)
