= Jeon sang ki =

Korean independence activist and entrepreneur

Jeon Sang Ki (June 10, 1886 - April 1, 1924) was a Korean independence activist and entrepreneur.

He was the representative of a national newspaper 'Dae Han So Gang', and sponsored various activist groups. He also served in the Korean Righteous Army as a lieutenant general.
