= Yu Sŏngwŏn =

Korean politician (d. 1456)

- Hangul: 유성원
- Hanja: 柳誠源
- RR: Yu Seongwon
- MR: Yu Sŏngwŏn

Art name
- Hangul: 낭간
- Hanja: 琅玕
- RR: Nanggan
- MR: Nanggan

Courtesy name
- Hangul: 태초
- Hanja: 太初
- RR: Taecho
- MR: T'aech'o

Yu Sŏngwŏn (also Ryu Sŏngwŏn) (died 1456) was a scholar-official of the early Joseon Dynasty, who is remembered as one of the six murdered ministers. He was born to a yangban family of the Munhwa Yu lineage, but his date of birth is not known.

Yu passed the lower examination 1444 and the higher examination in 1447. He was shortly thereafter appointed to the Hall of Worthies by Sejong. Yu was among the compilers of the first edition of the Classified Collection of Medical Prescriptions (yu bang yu chwi, 醫方類聚), together with other members of the Hall of Worthies.

In 1455, Sejo overthrew the reigning king Danjong. Yu joined with other high officials in a conspiracy to restore Danjong to the throne. This was discovered by the king shortly before it was to happen, and Yu committed suicide.

Yu's tomb lies today in Sayuksin Park in Noryangjin-dong, Dongjak District, Seoul. It was moved there in the 1970s.

== See also ==
- List of Joseon Dynasty people
- Joseon Dynasty politics
