= Yi Kae =

Joseon scholar-official (1417–1456)

- Hangul: 이개
- Hanja: 李塏
- RR: I Gae
- MR: I Kae

Art name
- Hangul: 백옥헌
- Hanja: 白玉軒
- RR: Baekokheon
- MR: Paegokhŏn

Courtesy name
- Hangul: 청보, 백고
- Hanja: 淸甫, 伯高
- RR: Cheongbo, Baekgo
- MR: Ch'ŏngbo, Paekko

Yi Kae (Korean: 이개; Hanja: 李塏; 1417–1456) was a Korean scholar-official of the Joseon period who came from the yangban Hansan Yi clan and one of the six martyred ministers. He was the great-grandson of Goryeo period philosopher Yi Saek and third cousin of Yi San-hae.

Yi passed the higher examination in 1436, and he was appointed to the Hall of Worthies by Sejong in 1441. After Munjong rose to the throne in 1450, he was appointed to provide personal instruction in the classics to the prince, who became the young King Danjong in 1453.

In 1455, Danjong was overthrown by Sejo. Yi joined a conspiracy of other high officials to overthrow Sejo and return Danjong to the throne; but just before the plot would have unfolded, it was betrayed to the king by Kim Chil. Arrested, he refused to repent under torture and was executed.

== Death Poem ==
Yi Kae wrote the following death poem in prison before his execution:

방안에 혔는 촛불 눌과 이별하엿관대

겉으로 눈물지고 속타는 줄 모르는다.

우리도 천리에 임 이별하고 속타는 듯하여라.

Oh, candlelight shining the room, with whom did you part?

You shed tears without and burn within, yet no one notices.

We part with our Lord thousand miles away and burn like thee.

== Popular culture ==
- Portrayed by Um Hyo-sup in the 2011 KBS2 TV series The Princess' Man.

== See also ==
- Joseon Dynasty politics
- Korean Confucianism
- List of Joseon Dynasty people
