= Yu Ŭngbu =

Korean military official

- Hangul: 유응부
- Hanja: 兪應孚
- RR: Yu Eungbu
- MR: Yu Ŭngbu

Art name
- Hangul: 벽량
- Hanja: 碧梁
- RR: Byeokryang
- MR: Pyŏngnyang

Courtesy name
- Hangul: 신지
- Hanja: 信之
- RR: Sinji
- MR: Sinji

Yu Ŭngbu (? – 1456) was an early Joseon Dynasty military official and is remembered as one of the six martyred ministers. Yu was born in Pocheon; his date of birth and lineage are unknown.

He served in the Gyeongwon garrison as chŏlchesa in 1448 and was the governor of Uiju-mok in 1452.

In 1455, Sejo overthrew King Danjong. Yu joined a conspiracy of high officials to restore Danjong. However, the plot was discovered shortly before it would have been executed in 1456. Yu and the other conspirators were arrested; after he failed to repent under torture, he was executed.

Today, a memorial to Yu stands inside Chungmokdan, in Soheul-eup, Pocheon, South Korea.

== See also ==
- Joseon Dynasty politics
