= Kiwan Sung =

Korean poet and musician (born 1967)

- Born: 1967 (age 58–59); Seoul, South Korea
- Education: Seoul National University
- Occupation: Poet
- Writing career
- Genre: Poetry

Kiwan Sung (born 1967) is a Korean poet and musician. He is noted for his avant-garde, experimental poems in the literary world. He aims to write poetry that is completely different from any preexisting poems and has tried many experimental attempts, such as putting music (sound) and poetry together. Sung's major work is the poetry collection Rieul (ㄹ, Rieul). He is currently working as a professor of sound art.

== Life ==
Sung was born in 1967 in Seoul, where he grew up. His father is Chan Kyung Sung, a poet and professor of English literature, whose 'willingness to experiment to the extreme' influenced him greatly. He inherited from his father his enthusiasm toward strange and convoluted experiment on language that goes beyond the realm of a poetic style.

He entered the Department of French Language and Literature, Seoul National University in 1986, and finished his doctor's degree there in 1996.

His career as a poet began after his poems were published in the 1994 fall edition of the quarterly Segyeui Munhak.

Since then he has been writing poetry, but also working in the music industry. He served as the music director of many TV series and films, including the MBC series Do It Your Way, and as the host of the EBS radio program Kiwan Sung's Journey into Music from 2005 to 2008. Sung was the leader of the band 3rd Line Butterfly and recorded many solo albums, such as Namuga doeneun beob (나무가 되는 법, How to Become a Tree) that came out in 1999 and Dangsinui norae (당신의 노래, Your Songs) in 2008. After leaving 3rd Line Butterfly, he has joined the group AASSA, short for Afro Asian SSound Act, and the sound archiving project group SSAP, Seoul Sound Archive Project.

Sung has been working as a popular music critic, as well. He was an editor of the culture magazine/book Ida (이다, Ida). His literary and musical works so far seem to "belong to nothing." In 2007, he became the director of the multi-cultural space Moonji Cultural Institute, Saii, and gave lectures for the general public titled Creative Listening, which incorporated a variety of genres like Korean traditional poetry, French poetry, and Korean popular music. Sung participated in the Residence Program for Writers in Sweden and many other literary events in 2008, which include the Seoul Young Writers' Festival. He is currently teaching sound art as the professor of the Department of Intermedia Art, Kaywon University of Art and Design.

== Writing ==
Sung's poetry is considered an innovative experiment that breaks taboos. His poems disregard the conventional poetry style and show such unique arrangements of words: for example, one of his poems reminds its readers of online chats. The poet intentionally juxtaposes words that have no relations to one another, defying common sense. His viewpoint is that noise and music are not different, so he focuses on the raw material and noise, or noise poetry, which means a poetry which comes from noise, completed through making fragmentary sounds.

His first poetry collection, Shoping gatda osimnigga (쇼핑 갔다 오십니까, Did You Go Shopping), published in 1998, deals with the features of the digital age like the internet. In the poem "A, B, C, D, E, F, geurigo X ui norae (A, B, C, D, E, F, 그리고 X의 노래, The song of A, B, C, D, E, F, and X)," digital signals wipe out the specific realities of individuals and refer to them by symbols. As the digital age reincarnates them as symbols instead of alienating them, it is not wasteful but productive.

The three main words of his second poetry collection, Yuri iyagi (유리 이야기, Story of Glass), published in 2003, are 'green rubber monster,' 'glass,' and 'me.' They all represent the poet, his divided selves. 48 poems with a series of numbers as titles—63 stories including the epilogue—are dreamy and fantastic. All the poems are not finished; however, when regarding all the 63 poems as one story, they become a sort of novel. The purpose of such organization is to create a whole new rhythm for the poems and this poetry collection, which is totally different from the rhythm of any preexisting poetry.

Dangsinui tekseuteu (당신의 텍스트, Your Text), his third poetry collection published in 2008, is mostly made up of noise. The poet explains that, when paying attention to noise with senses other than the sense of hearing, one can enjoy it as music. The title poem "Dangsinui tekseuteu," by repeating the words "your text" and "me," separates the relationship between 'you' and the 'text' and 'me.' In the poem "Hwanghon, myeokrasu (황혼, 멱라수, Dusk, the River of Mishui)," the narrator is woman, unlike Sung's other poems, and she talks about the love that has no answers, the love of the body.

His fourth poetry collection Rieul, published in 2012, is only composed of sounds. This work is based on sound art, which is the creative activity that uses sound without any limits. It was published with an album of two CDs entitled Sonicwallpaper4poetrybook. The album is for the book and vice versa, but they can be enjoyed in both independent and interrelated ways. The aim of the work is to ruminate over the meaning of the frivolous noise and music in daily life, and to give a new meaning to the sounds that have been considered noise and kitsch, such as sign boards, daily conversations, tweets, and commercials.

== Works ==
=== Poetry collections ===
- 《쇼핑 갔다 오십니까》, 문학과 지성사, 1998 / Shoping gatda osimnigga (Did You Go Shopping), Moonji, 1998, ISBN 9788932009940
- 《유리 이야기》, 문학과 지성사, 2003 / Yuri iyagi (Story of Yuri), Moonji, 2003, ISBN 9788932014395
- 《당신의 텍스트》, 문학과 지성사, 2008 / Dangsinui tekseuteu (Your Text), Moonji, 2008, ISBN 9788932018737
- 《ㄹ》, 민음사, 2012 / Rieul (Rieul), Mineumsa, 2012, ISBN 978-89-374-0805-2

=== Prose collections ===
- 《재즈를 찾아서》, 문학과 지성사, 1998 / Jaejeureul chajaseo (In Search of Jazz), Moonji, 1998, ISBN 9788932008585
- 《장밋빛 도살장》, 문학동네, 2002 / Jangmitbit dosaljang (Rose-colored Slaughterhouse), Munhakdongne, 2002, ISBN 9788982814600
- 《홍대 앞 새벽 세시》, 사문난적, 2009 / Hongdae ap saebyeok sesi (In Front of Hongik University, at Three in the Morning), Samunnanjeok, 2009, ISBN 9788996131168
- 《모듈》, 문학과 지성사, 2012 / Modyul (Module), Moonji, 2012, ISBN 9788932022833

=== Translations ===
- E. Ann Kaplan, Rocking Around the Clock: Music Television, Post Modernism and Consumer Culture, 1987 / 《뮤직비디오, 어떻게 읽을 것인가》, 성기완, 채규진 역, 한나래, 1996, ISBN 9788985367370
- Alain Dister, L'Âge du rock, 1992 / 《록의 시대》, 성기완 역, 시공사, 1996, ISBN 9788972593331
- René Goscinny, Albert Uderzo, Astérix Le Gaulois, 1961 / 《골족의 영웅 아스테릭스》, 성기완, 오영주 역, 문학과 지성사, 2001, ISBN 9788932012681
- René Goscinny, Albert Uderzo, Astérix et Cléopâtre, 1965 / 《아스테릭스 클레오파트라를 만나다》, 성기완, 오영주 역, 문학과 지성사, 2001, ISBN 9788932012698
- René Goscinny, Albert Uderzo, Astérix gladiateur, 1964 / 《글래디에이터가 된 아스테릭스》, 성기완, 오영주 역, 문학과 지성사, 2001, ISBN 9788932012704
- René Goscinny, Albert Uderzo, Astérix et les Normands, 1966 / 《바이킹을 물리치다》, 성기완, 오영주 역, 문학과 지성사, 2001, ISBN 9788932012742
- René Goscinny, Albert Uderzo, Astérix aux Jeux Olympiques, 1968 / 《아스테릭스, 올림픽에 나가다》, 성기완, 오영주 역, 문학과 지성사, 2001, ISBN 9788932012759
- René Goscinny, Albert Uderzo, La Grande Traversée, 1975 / 《아스테릭스, 신대륙을 발견하다》, 성기완, 오영주 역, 문학과 지성사, 2002, ISBN 9788932012766
- René Goscinny, Albert Uderzo, Astérix et les Goths, 1963 / 《아스테릭스, 고트족 국경을 넘다》, 성기완, 오영주 역, 문학과 지성사, 2002, ISBN 9788932013336
- René Goscinny, Albert Uderzo, La Serpe D'or, 1962 / 《아스테릭스, 황금낫을 찾아랏!》, 성기완, 오영주 역, 문학과 지성사, 2002, ISBN 9788932013541
- René Goscinny, Albert Uderzo, Le Tour de Gaule d'Astérix, 1965 / 《아스테릭스아 골의 12보물》, 성기완, 오영주 역, 문학과 지성사, 2002, ISBN 9788932013558
- René Goscinny, Albert Uderzo, Le combat des chefs, 1966 / 《아스테릭스 마을의 대결투》, 성기완, 오영주 역, 문학과 지성사, 2003, ISBN 9788932013824
- René Goscinny, Albert Uderzo, Astérix chez les Bretons, 1966 / 《아스테릭스 영국에 가다》, 성기완, 오영주 역, 문학과 지성사, 2003, ISBN 9788932013831
- Peter Harry Brown, Pat H. Broeske, Down at the End of Lonely Street: The Life and Death of Elvis Presley, 1997 / 《엘비스, 끝나지 않는 전설》, 성기완, 최윤석 역, 이마고, 2006, ISBN 9788990429513
- Miles Davis, Miles: The Autobiography, 1989 / 《마일스 데이비스》, 성기완 역, 집사재, 2006, ISBN 978-1451643183
- Christiane Saint-Jean-Paulin, La Contre-culture, 1997 / 《히피와 반문화》, 성기완 역, 문학과 지성사, 2015, ISBN 9788932027135

=== Anthologies ===
- <극단의 실험정신을 물려준 아버지-시인 성찬경>, 최동호, 곽효환 편, 《아버지, 그리운 당신》, 서정시학, 2009 / "Geukdanui silheom jeongsineul mullyeojun abeoji—si-in sung chan-kyeong (My Father Who Left Me My Spirit to Experiment: Poet Sung Chan-kyeong)," edited by Choi Dong-ho, Gwak Hyo-hwan, Abeoji, geuriun dangsin (I Miss You, Father), Lyric Poetry and Poetics, 2009
- <시그널 플로우: 휴머니즘으로서의 반휴머니즘>, 성기완 외, 《퍼포먼스, 윤리적 정치성》, 현실문화, 2011 / "Sigeuneol peulou: Humeonijeum euroseoui banhumeonijeum (Signal Flow: Anti-humanism as a Form of Humanism)", Kiwan Sung et al, Peopomeonseu, yunrijeok jeongchiseong (Performance, Moral Politicality), Hyeonsilbook, 2011
- 〈일편단심하고하루깍쟁이1〉, 고은 외, 《왜 사랑하느냐고 묻거든》, 문학사상, 2012 / "Ilpyeondansimhagoharuggakjaengi1 (LoveWithSincereHeartButFeigningIndifference1), Ko Un et al, Wae Sarang haneunyago mutgeodeun (If You Ask Me Why I Love You), Munhak Sasangsa, 2012

== Awards ==
- The Fifth Baum Literary Work Award (제5회 바움작품상, 2013)
- The First Kim Hyeon Literature Prize (제1회 김현문학패, 2015)
