= Kim Chongsŏ =

Korean general (1383–1453)

Kim Chongsŏ 김종서 金宗瑞

Left State Councillor
- In office January 20, 1453 – November 10, 1453 (Note: Lunar calendar: 27th day of 12th month, ascension year of Danjong – 10th day of 10th month, 1st year of Danjong)
- Preceded by: Nam Chi
- Succeeded by: Chŏng Inji

Right State Councillor
- In office November 17, 1451 – January 20, 1453 (Note: Lunar calendar: 24th day of 10th month, 1st year of Munjong – 27th day of 12th month, ascension year of Danjong)
- Preceded by: Nam Chi
- Succeeded by: Chŏng Pun

Personal details
- Born: 1383 Gongju-mok, Yanggwang Province, Goryeo
- Died: November 10, 1453 (aged 69–70) Hanseong, Joseon
- Manner of death: Assassination
- Resting place: Sejong City, Janggun-myeon, Daegyori-san 45
- Occupation: Official, general, politician, poet
- Nickname(s): Big Tiger (대호, 大虎)

Korean name
- Hangul: 김종서
- Hanja: 金宗瑞
- RR: Gim Jongseo
- MR: Kim Chongsŏ

Art name
- Hangul: 절재
- Hanja: 節齋
- RR: Jeoljae
- MR: Chŏlchae

Courtesy name
- Hangul: 국경
- Hanja: 國卿
- RR: Gukgyeong
- MR: Kukkyŏng

Posthumous name
- Hangul: 충익
- Hanja: 忠翼
- RR: Chungik
- MR: Ch'ungik

Kim Chongsŏ (Korean: 김종서; Hanja: 金宗瑞; 1383 – 10 November 1453) was a prominent military official and politician of the early Joseon dynasty. His ancestral home was Suncheon. He was also known under the names Kukkyŏng and Chŏlchae, and his posthumous name was Ch'ungik. In 1405, he passed the state examination and became a rank 13 official. He served King Sejong the Great as a general during the campaign against the Jurchens. In 1453, he was assassinated on the order of Grand Prince Suyang along with his two sons, due to his attempts to stop the prince from seizing the throne from his young nephew, King Danjong.

== Biography ==
=== Early life ===
Kim Chongsŏ was born in 1383 in Gongju, Yanggwang Province as the second son of Kim Su of the Suncheon Kim clan, and Lady Pae of the Seongju Pae clan. He was the third child; having two sisters and two brothers. Kim and his brothers achieved successful political careers: his older brother, Kim Chonghan was a high-ranking official, and his younger brother, Kim Chonghŭng was the magistrate of Yangju.

=== Career ===
He passed the state examination in 1405 and in 1411 he was posted as a royal inspector to Gangwon Province. In 1433, he was sent by King Sejong the Great to conquer the Jurchens. Kim's military campaign captured several castles, pushed north, and restored Korean territory roughly to the present-day border between North Korea and China.

=== The campaigns against the Jurchens ===
The tribe of Wild Jurchens often crossed the Tumen and Yalu rivers and made marauding incursions through the Joseon border. Since the times of the Goryeo period, there were conciliatory efforts through trade as well as attempted suppression of the raiders by force, but the border conflicts did not cease. Early in the Joseon dynasty, the northern part of Yeongbyeon county was lost to the Jurchen invaders.

To solve the issue once for all, in 1433, King Sejong sent General Ch'oe Yundŏk to suppress the Wild Jurchens in the Yalu River Basin. In October of the same year, Kim Chongsŏ led another expedition to the northern part of Hamgyeong province, where he defeated the Jurchens and strengthened the borders against future attacks.

=== Later life and death ===
Following King Sejong's death, Grand Prince Suyang's ill brother, Munjong, took the throne but soon died. The crown passed to his 12-year-old son, Danjong. The new king was too young to rule the nation and all political processes were controlled by then-Chief State Councilor Hwangbo In and General Kim Chongsŏ. As Kim Chongsŏ and his faction, which included Danjong's guardian Princess Gyeonghye, used the chance to extend the power of court officials against many royal family members, the tension between Kim and Prince Suyang greatly increased; not only Prince Suyang himself, but his younger brother, Grand Prince Anpyeong also sought an opportunity to take control of the kingdom.

Suyang surrounded himself with trusted allies, including his famous adviser, Han Myŏnghoe, who was the father of two queens: Queen Jangsun, the daughter-in-law of Queen Jeonghui and King Sejo, and Queen Gonghye, the daughter-in-law of Queen Insu and King Deokjong. Han was also an 8th cousin of Queen Insu. Han advised Suyang to take over the government in a coup, and in October 1453, he killed Kim Chongsŏ and his faction, thereby taking the reins of power into his own hands. After the coup, Grand Prince Suyang arrested his own brother, Grand Prince Anpyeong, first sending him into exile, then putting him to death.

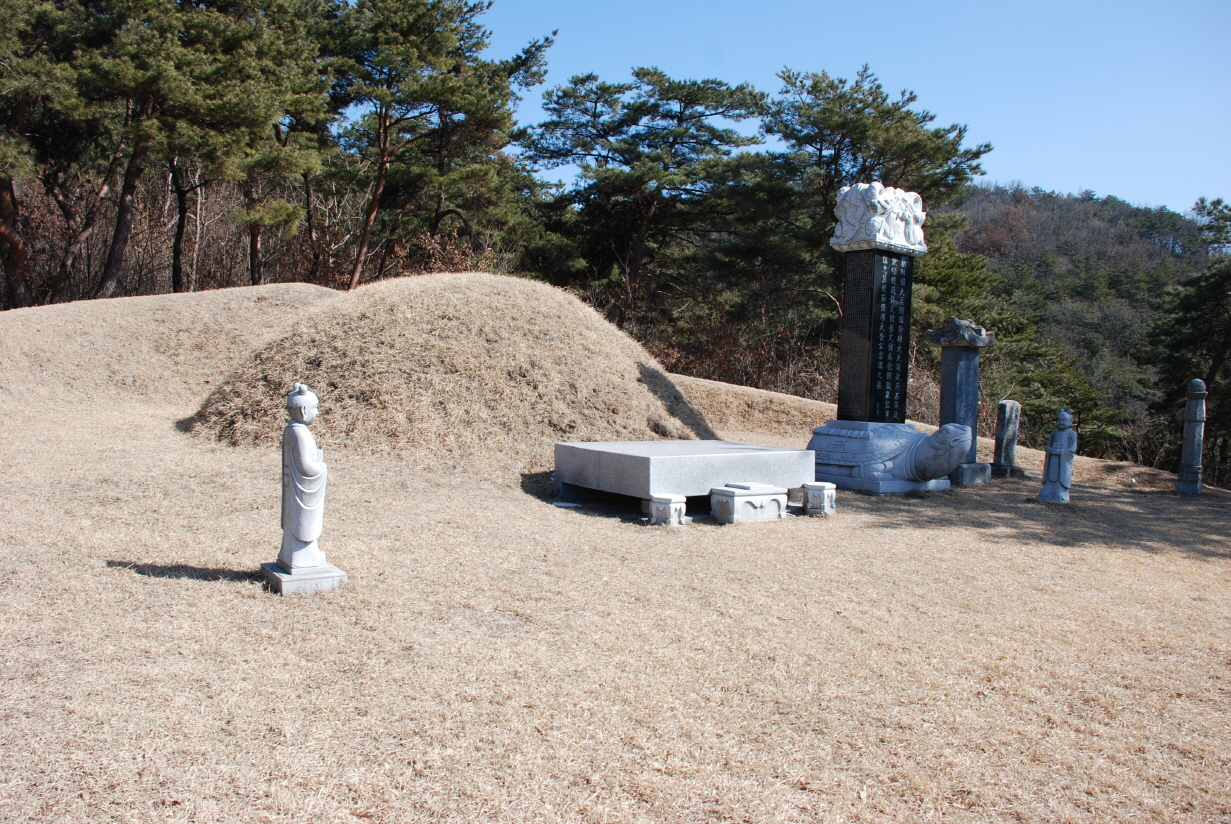
The tomb of Kim Chongsŏ

Kim's tomb is located near modern-day Sejong City. After death, he received posthumous name of Ch'ungik in 1746 during Yeongjo's reign.

== Family ==
- Father
  - Kim Su (김수; 金陲) or Kim Ch'u (김추; 金錘; 1355–?)
- Mother
  - Lady Pae of Seongju Pae clan (성주 배씨; 星州裵氏; 1356 – 12 October 1435)
- Siblings
  - Older sister - Lady Kim of the Suncheon Kim clan (순천 김씨; 1376–?)
  - Older brother - Kim Chonghan (김종한; 金宗漢; 1380–?)
  - Younger brother - Kim Chonghŭng (김종흥; 金宗興; 1387–?)
  - Younger sister - Lady Kim of the Suncheon Kim clan (순천 김씨; 1390–?)
- Wives and their children
  - Unnamed wife (1385–?); married in 1403
    - Son - Kim Mokdae (김목대; 金目臺; 1410–1453)
    - Son - Kim Sŏkdae (김석대; 金石臺; 1414–1453)
  - Lady Yun of Papyeong Yun clan (정경부인 파평 윤씨; 貞敬夫人 坡平 尹氏; 1390–?), married in 1407; daughter of Yun Won-bu (윤원부; 尹元富)
    - Son - Kim Sŭnggyu (김승규; 金承珪; 1410 – 10 November 1453)
    - Son - Kim Sŭngbyŏk (김승벽; 金承璧; 1415 – 10 November 1453)
    - Son - Kim Sŭngyu (김승유; 金承琉; 1418–?)
    - Daughter - Lady Kim of the Suncheon Kim clan (순천 김씨; 1420–?)
    - Daughter - Lady Kim of the Suncheon Kim clan (순천 김씨; 1423–?)
    - Daughter - Lady Kim of the Suncheon Kim clan (순천 김씨; 1427–?)
    - Daughter - Lady Kim of the Suncheon Kim clan (순천 김씨; 1446–?)
  - Unnamed Jurchen concubine (여진족; 1390–?) — no issue.

== Popular culture ==
- Portrayed by Choi Il-hwa in the 2011 SBS TV series Deep Rooted Tree.
- Portrayed by Han In-soo in the 2011–2012 JTBC TV series Insu, The Queen Mother.
- Portrayed by Lee Soon-jae in the 2011 KBS2 TV series The Princess' Man.
- Portrayed by Baek Yoon-sik in the 2013 film The Face Reader.
