= Six martyred ministers =

Joseon ministers executed in 1456

- Hangul: 사육신
- Hanja: 死六臣
- RR: Sayuksin
- MR: Sayuksin

The six martyred ministers or Sayuksin (Korean: 사육신; Hanja: 死六臣) were six ministers of the Joseon Dynasty who were executed by King Sejo in 1456 for plotting to assassinate him and restore the former king Danjong to the throne.

The Six were Sŏng Sammun, Pak Paeng-nyeon, Ha Wi-ji, Yi Kae, Yu Ŭngbu, and Yu Sŏngwŏn. Most were members of the Hall of Worthies, a royal research institute, who had been appointed by King Sejong. Both King Sejong and King Munjong had charged them with looking after King Danjong (son and grandson respectively), and they reacted with outrage to Sejo's usurpation of the throne in 1455. Together with Kim Chil, they plotted a coup to coincide with the visit of a Ming Dynasty envoy. When the banquet and subsequently the assassination plot were postponed, Kim Chil lost his heart and betrayed the plot to his father-in-law, who reported to Sejo. The Six except Yu Sŏngwŏn, who committed suicide with his wife, were seized and tortured.

Sejo felt deeply betrayed, for he had valued the six scholar-officials very highly and promoted them to high positions in favor of his own supporters who helped him take the throne. He tried to force them to repent their deeds and acknowledge his legitimacy with a combination of torture, offers of pardon, and even poetry. He sent Kim Chil to their cells to recite a poem that King Taejong of Joseon had used to test the great Goryeo scholar Chŏng Mong-ju's loyalty to the Goryeo dynasty. Sŏng Sammun, Pak Paeng-nyeon, and Yi Kae all answered with poems that reaffirmed their loyalty to Danjong. (These famous death poems cemented their reputation in Korean history.)

When Pak continued to refuse to address Sejo with royal title, Sejo argued that it was meaningless to deny his legitimacy now since Pak had already called himself a "royal servant" and received royal grains from him. Pak, however, denied this and it was indeed discovered that Pak had purposefully misspelled the words "royal servant" (he wrote the word meaning "huge" (巨) instead of "royal servant" 臣) in all of his reports and never used royal grains but instead put them unused in a storage. Pak died from torture in prison, and the rest were executed.

Although the Six were the most famous, more than 70 were put to death for their suspected involvement in the plot or sympathy with Danjong. As was common with treason cases, the penalties were not limited to the individual but extended to the entire family. The men of the family were put to death, and the women were made slaves.

There were also many officials who were not involved in the plot but had retreated to rural provinces in protest to Sejo's usurpation. Six of the most famous men among them, including Kim Si-sŭp, were called "Six living ministers" (생육신).

After the Sarim faction came to dominate Joseon politics, national opinion came to revere the Six martyred ministers as model subjects, and numerous shrines and seowon were erected in their memory. This attitude continued in the 20th century, with philosopher Ham Seok-heon praising their conduct and saying that "the shame of the five centuries of Yi Korea were more than offset by this event."

== In media ==
The story of the Six is also often dramatized in literature and TV series, the latest being the historical drama Sayukshin, produced in North Korea and starring Jo Myung-Ae. This show, which was the first North Korean drama to be aired in the South, was broadcast in South Korea in August 2007. They also briefly appear in the 2026 film, The King's Warden.

== See also ==
- Politics in the Joseon Dynasty
- History of Korea
