= Ha Wiji =

Joseon scholar-official (1387–1456)

- Hangul: 하위지
- Hanja: 河緯地
- RR: Ha Wiji
- MR: Ha Wiji

Art name
- Hangul: 단계, 연풍
- Hanja: 丹溪, 延風
- RR: Dangye, Yeonpung
- MR: Tan'gye, Yŏnp'ung

Courtesy name
- Hangul: 천장, 중장
- Hanja: 天章, 仲章
- RR: Cheonjang, Jungjang
- MR: Ch'ŏnjang, Chungjang

Ha Wiji (Korean: 하위지; Hanja: 河緯地; 1387–1456) was a scholar-official of the early Joseon Dynasty.

== See also ==
- Joseon Dynasty politics
- List of Joseon Dynasty people
