= Pak P'aengnyŏn =

Joseon scholar-official (1417–1456)

- Hangul: 박팽년
- Hanja: 朴彭年
- RR: Bak Paengnyeon
- MR: Pak P'aengnyŏn

Art name
- Hangul: 취금헌
- Hanja: 醉琴軒
- RR: Chwigeumheon
- MR: Ch'wigŭmhŏn

Courtesy name
- Hangul: 인수
- Hanja: 仁叟
- RR: Insu
- MR: Insu

Pak P'aengnyŏn (Korean: 박팽년; Hanja: 朴彭年; 1417 – 7 June 1456) was a scholar-official of the early Joseon Dynasty, and is known as one of the six martyred ministers. He was born to a yangban family of the Suncheon Pak clan, and was the son of high minister Pak Chungnim. He passed the lower national service examination at a royal visitation in 1434, and was later appointed to the Hall of Worthies by Sejong. In the 1440s, he participated with other members of the Hall of Worthies in the creation of the Hunminjeongeum and the creation of the Hangul alphabet. He passed the higher literary examination in 1447, and rose to vice-minister of justice under Danjong in 1454. He was an 8th cousin of Pak Wŏnjong, the maternal uncle of Yun Im and Queen Janggyeong, the second wife of King Jungjong.

== Biography ==
In 1455, Danjong was overthrown by Sejo, arising the ire of Pak and many other officials. Pak continued to serve in high office; he was appointed as governor of Chungcheong in 1455, and again as vice-minister of justice in 1456. He joined in a plot to overthrow Sejo and restore Danjong in 1456, but the plot was uncovered through the betrayal of fellow plotter Kim Chil. Sejo admired Pak's abilities and offered to pardon him if he were to deny his involvement and acknowledge Sejo as his king. When he refused to repent from his deeds, Sejo argued that it was useless to deny his authority now since Pak had already called himself a "royal servant" and received royal grains from him. Pak, however, denied this and it was indeed discovered that Pak purposefully misspelled words "royal servant" in all of his reports (He wrote word meaning "huge"(巨) instead of "royal servant", 臣), and never used royal grains but instead stored them unused in a storage. Pak died in prison from torture. All the males in his family were executed and females were enslaved.

A shrine to Pak is located in Sinni-myeon, Chungju, North Chungcheong Province. It was established in the 18th century, when Pak and his fellows had come to be viewed as model subjects. Another memorial dating to 1688 stands in Jayang-dong, Dong-gu, Daejeon, at the former site of his official residence. A few of Pak's sijo poems have survived.

== Family ==
- Father
  - Pak Chungnim (박중림; 朴仲林; 1390–1456)
- Mother
  - Biological - Lady Kim of the Andong Kim clan (안동 김씨; 1392–?); married 1415
  - Step - Lady Yi of the Sinpyeong Yi clan (신평 이씨; 1400–?); married 1420
- Sibling(s)
  - Younger brother - Pak Innyŏn (박인년; 朴引年; 1419–1456)
  - Younger brother - Pak Kinyŏn (박기년; 朴耆年; 1421–1456)
  - Younger brother - Pak Tae-nyŏn (박대년; 朴大年; 1423–1456)
  - Younger brother - Pak Yŏng-nyŏn (박영년; 朴永年; 1425–1456)
  - Younger sister - Lady Pak of the Suncheon Pak clan (순천 박씨; 順天 朴氏; 1427–?)
  - Younger sister - Lady Pak of the Suncheon Pak clan (순천 박씨; 順天 朴氏; 1430–?)
- Wives and their children
  - Lady Jeon of the Cheonan Chŏn clan (천안 전씨; 天安 全氏; 1417–1499); daughter of Jeon Mi (전미, 全彌; 1392–?)
    - Daughter - Lady Pak of the Suncheon Pak clan (순천 박씨; 順天 朴氏; 1435–?)
    - Daughter - Lady Pak of the Suncheon Pak clan (순천 박씨; 順天 朴氏; 1440–1524)
    - Daughter - Princess Consort Pak of the Suncheon Pak clan (군부인 순천 박씨; 郡夫人 順天朴氏; 1440–1500)
    - Son - Pak Pun (박분; 朴苯; 1444–1456)
  - Kim Okgŭm (김옥금; 金玉今), Lady Kim of the Nakan Kim clan (낙안 김씨; 1418–?); daughter of Kim Mi (김미; 金彌)
    - Son - Pak Hŏn (박헌; 朴憲; 1437–1456)
    - Son - Pak Sun (박순; 朴珣; 1442–1456)

== In popular culture ==
- Portrayed by Lee Won-woo in the 1994 KBS2 TV series Han Myeong-hoe
- Portrayed by Kim Ha-gyun in the 1998–2000 KBS1 TV series The King and the Queen
- Portrayed by Lee Yong-jin in the 2011 KBS TV series The Princess' Man
- Portrayed by Kim Ki-bum in the 2011 SBS TV series Deep Rooted Tree.

== See also ==
- Joseon Dynasty politics
- List of Joseon Dynasty people
