= An Kyŏn =

Joseon painter (fl. 15th century)

- Hangul: 안견
- Hanja: 安堅
- RR: An Gyeon
- MR: An Kyŏn

Art name
- Hangul: 현동자, 주경
- Hanja: 玄洞子, 朱耕
- RR: Hyeondongja, Jugyeong
- MR: Hyŏndongja, Chugyŏng

Courtesy name
- Hangul: 가도, 득수
- Hanja: 可度, 得守
- RR: Gado, Deuksu
- MR: Kado, Tŭksu

An Kyŏn (Korean: 안견; Hanja: 安堅; fl. 15th century) was a Korean painter of the early Joseon period. He was born in Jigok, Seosan, South Chungcheong Province. He entered royal service as a member of the Dohwaseo, the official painters of the Joseon court. In 1447, he drew Mongyu dowondo, a landscape painting for Grand Prince Anpyeong. Considered the oldest landscape painting by a Korean artist, the painting is currently stored at Tenri University.

His art name was Hyŏndongja (현동자; 玄洞子) and his courtesy name was Kado (가도; 可度).

== Legacy ==
An Gyeon and his followers led the most influential school of landscape painting during the early Joseon dynasty. Their works were characterized by an asymmetrical three-part composition, carefully arranged objects within open spaces, and a striking contrast between black and white. This style of landscape painting later influenced painters of the Muromachi period in Japan, notably Tenshō Shūbun.

== Gallery ==
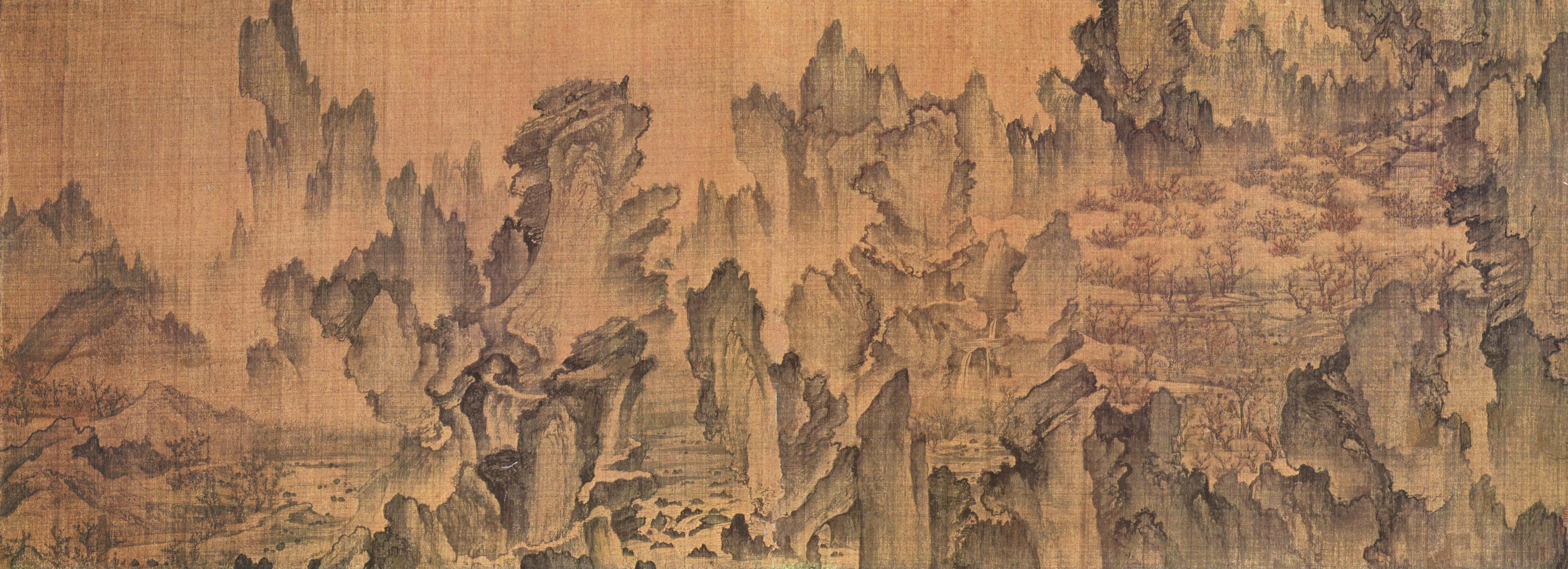
Mongyu dowondo (Dream Journey to the Peach Blossom Land)

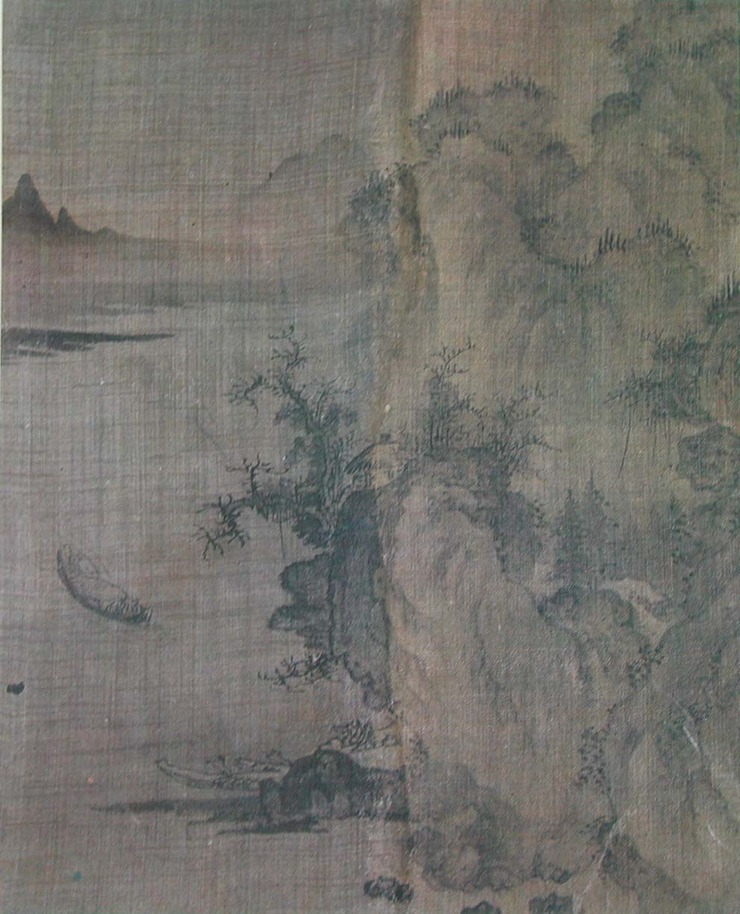
초춘 early spring

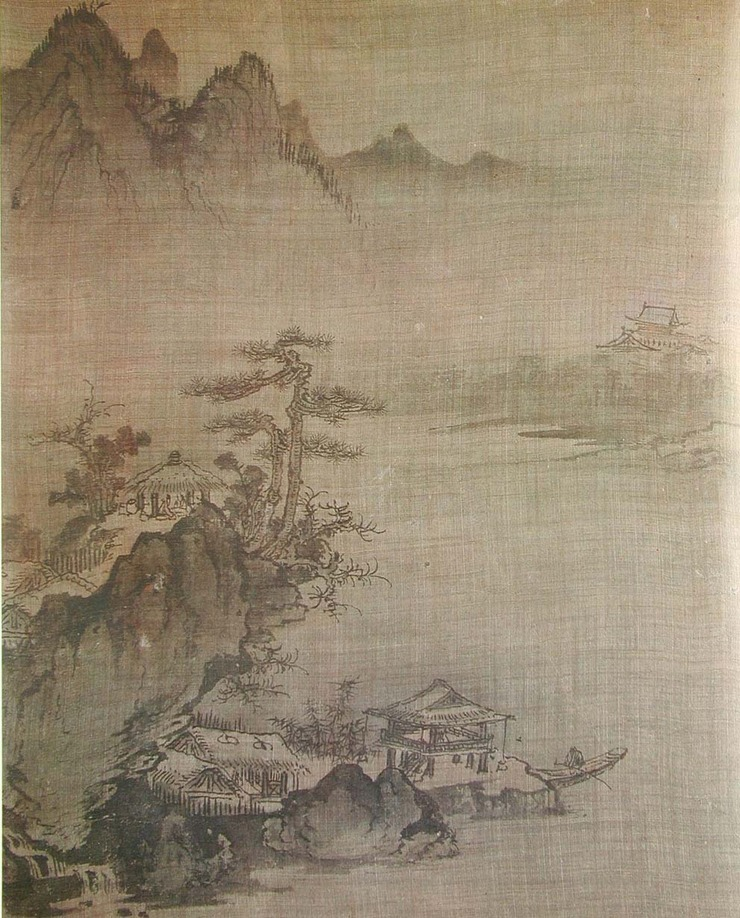
만춘 late spring

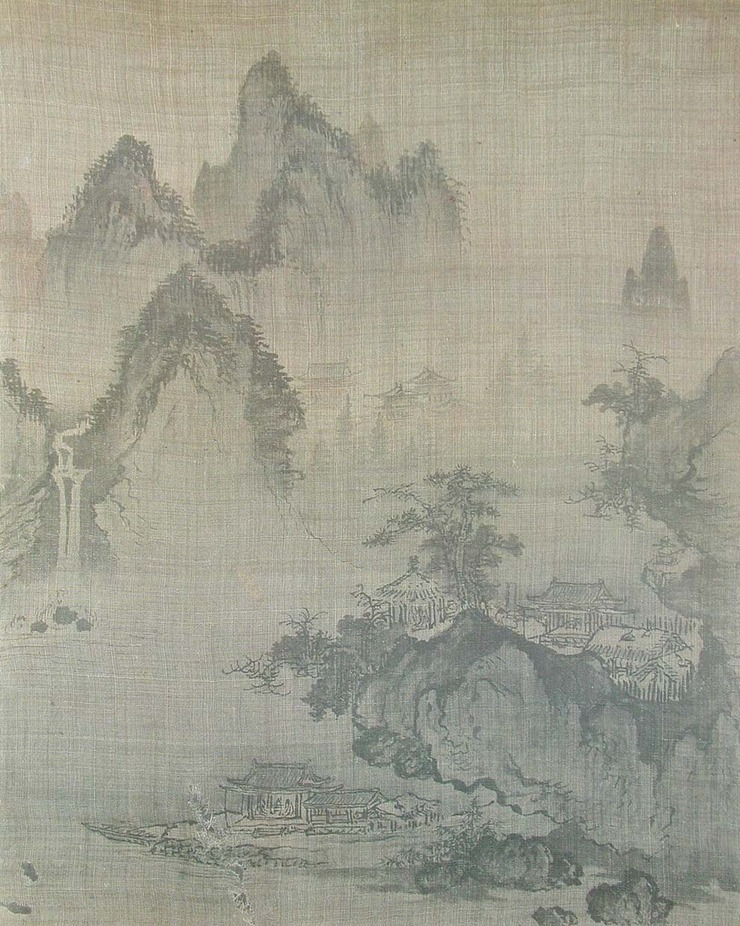
초하 early summer

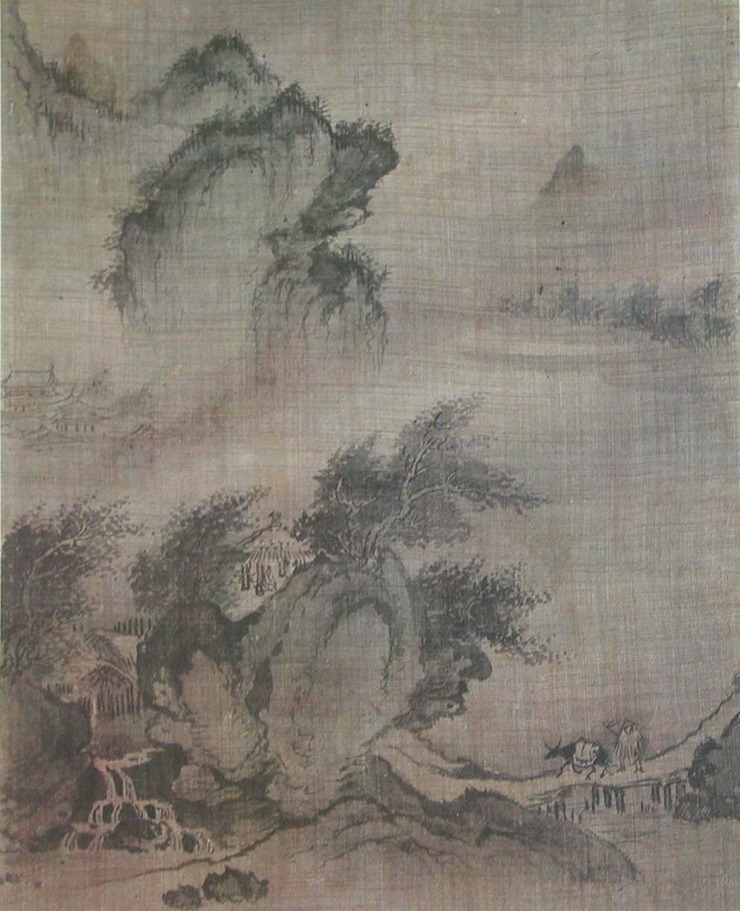
만하 late summer

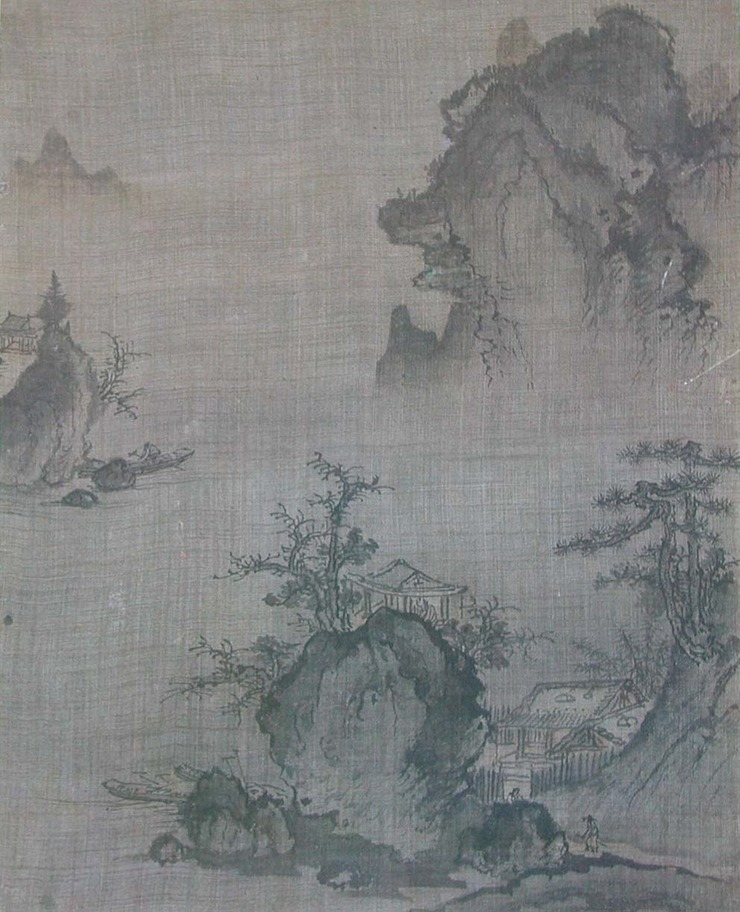
초추 early autumn

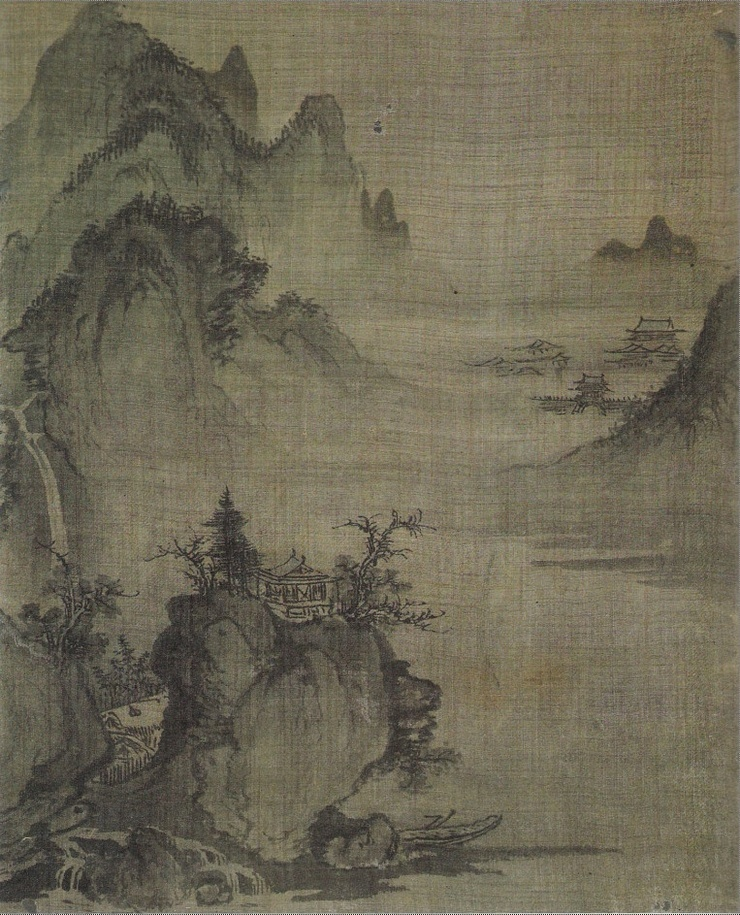
만추 late autumn

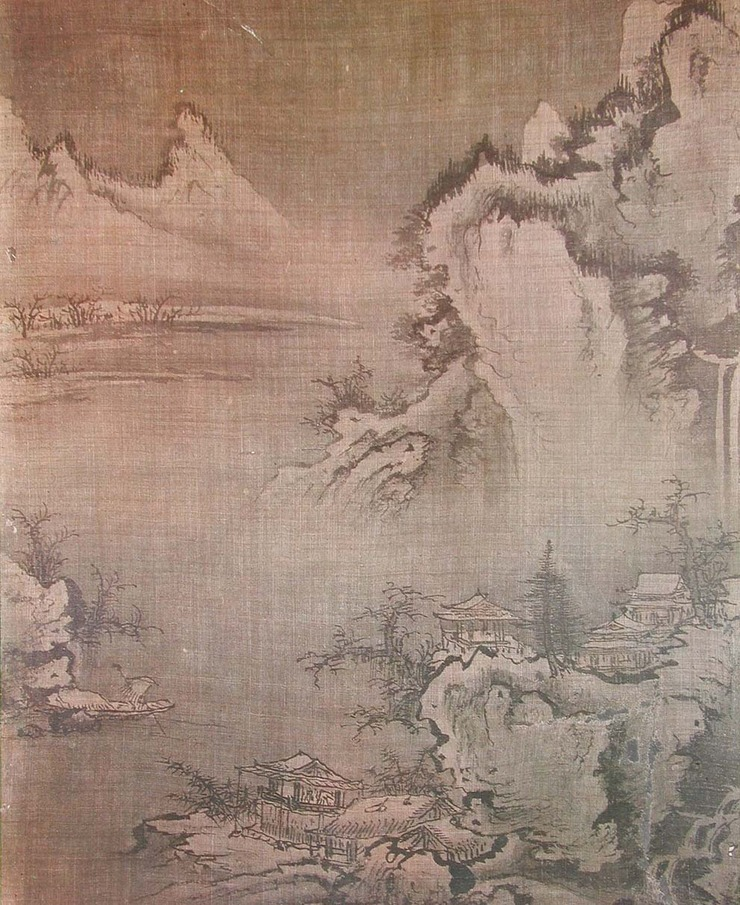
초동 early winter

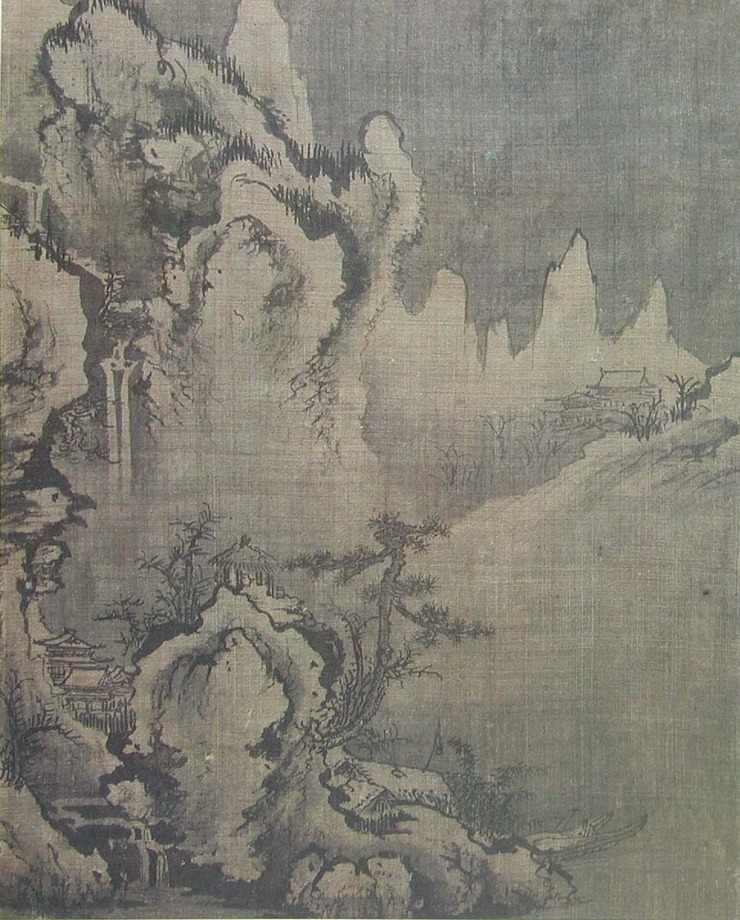
만동 late winter

사시팔경도 - Eight views of the Four Seasons

== See also ==
- Korean art
- Korean culture
- Korean painting
- List of Korean painters
