= Hello Ghost =

Hello Ghost may refer to:

- Hello Ghost (2010 film), a South Korean comedy film about a man's multiple suicide attempts
- Hello Ghost (2023 film), Taiwanese remake of the 2010 film
