= Cha Tae-hyun =

South Korean actor (born 1976)

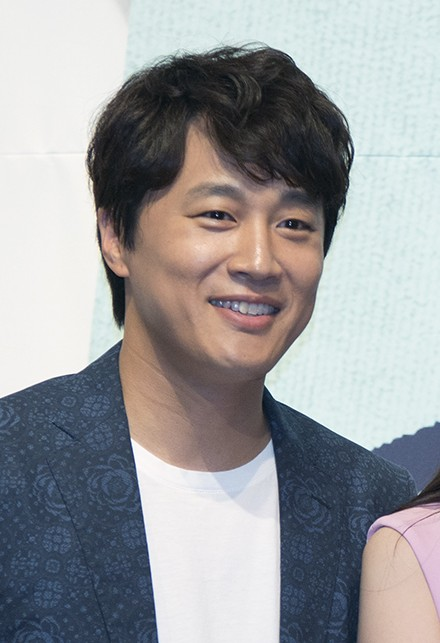
- Cha in May 2015
- Born: March 25, 1976 (age 50); Seoul, South Korea
- Occupations: Actor; singer; television personality; radio DJ; director
- Years active: 1995–present
- Agent: Basecamp Company
- Spouse: Choi Suk-eun (m. 2006)
- Children: 3

Korean name
- Hangul: 차태현
- Hanja: 車太鉉
- RR: Cha Taehyeon
- MR: Ch'a T'aehyŏn

Cha Tae-hyun (Korean: 차태현; born March 25, 1976) is a South Korean actor, singer, television personality, radio DJ and director. He is best known for his lead roles in the box-office hit comedies My Sassy Girl (2001), Scandal Makers (2008), Hello Ghost (2010), The Grand Heist (2012), and fantasy drama action hit Along with the Gods: The Two Worlds (2017) as well as the television series Jeon Woo-chi (2012), The Producers (2015), and Police University (2021). He made his directorial debut with the variety-drama Hit the Top (2017), in which he also starred.

From 2012 to 2019, he was a cast member of the variety show 2 Days & 1 Night. He is a co-founder of the talent management agencies Blossom Entertainment (with Ju Bang-ok) and Basecamp Company (with Zo In-sung).

== Career ==
=== 1995–2000: Beginnings ===
Cha Tae-hyun started his career as a silver medalist in a 1995 KBS Talent Contest. Over the next several years he would star in a large number of TV dramas such as Sunflower and Happy Together, while also appearing in numerous TV commercials. He was the radio DJ for KBS Cool FM's FM Popular Music with Cha Tae-hyun from 1999 to 2000, and made a minor film debut in the comedy Hallelujah.

=== 2001–2007: My Sassy Girl and musical debut ===
In 2001, he rose to fame through the hugely successful romantic comedy My Sassy Girl where he acted alongside Jun Ji-hyun. Cha's expressive acting established him as a recognized star in Korea as well as the Asian region at large, and he extended his fame by releasing his debut album Accident. His next film Lovers' Concerto (2002), a tragic melodrama with actresses Son Ye-jin and Lee Eun-ju, also proved to be a popular success.

From 2003, however, Cha's casting choices proved to be less inspired. He appeared in three comedies -- Crazy First Love, Happy Ero Christmas and Two Guys —that were widely criticized by audiences for their weak scripts and lack of creativity. He released his second album The Book later that year.

His 2005 films—the relationship film Sad Movie with an all-star ensemble cast, and melodrama My Girl and I opposite Song Hye-kyo, the remake of Japanese hit film Crying Out Love in the Center of the World —were box office disappointments. 2007's Highway Star, in which he played a masked trot singer, was a moderate success.

Cha hosted KBS Cool FM's Mr. Radio from 2007 to 2008, and was awarded Best Radio DJ at the 2007 KBS Entertainment Awards alongside Ahn Jae-wook. He then portrayed the town's jester who has the intelligence of a six-year-old in BABO (which means "fool" in Korean), a film adaptation of Kang Full's popular online comic.

=== 2008–2012: Revived popularity and 2 Days & 1 Night ===
Cha regained his top star status when his comedy flick Scandal Makers became the number one film of 2008, attracting 8.2 million moviegoers and ranking among Korea's biggest hits of all time. The film centers on a radio talk show host, who was ex- idol, who must face unforeseen consequences of a love affair when he was a teen, when he discovers that he already has a daughter (Park Bo-young) and a grandson (Wang Seok-hyun) at the age of 30. As a result of the film's success, the advertising industry named Cha as the top male celebrity endorser of 2009.

He reunited with BABO director Kim Young-tak in 2010's Hello Ghost, a film about a man who after several suicide attempts, becomes possessed by four different ghosts. It was another box office success at 3 million tickets sold, and Cha's performance led him to be dubbed as "Korea's Jim Carrey."

Based on a true story, his 2011 film Champ depicts the relationship between a recently injured racehorse named Woo-bak and the jockey who tries to tame her. Cha spent time with the horse before and during filming, luring his four-legged partner with a combination of carrots and sugar cubes.

In 2012, he became a regular cast member of the second season of popular variety program 2 Days & 1 Night, and remained as a member until 2019. The show, which focuses on introducing various places in Korea to the viewers while the cast takes on different missions, has consistently scored high viewership ratings.

=== 2013–2018: Continued success and directorial debut ===
Cha played his first historical role in The Grand Heist, as the leader of a Joseon era group of thieves who band together to steal ice. The action-comedy film was produced by his brother Cha Ji-hyun. He took on another sageuk role as the titular character in TV series Jeon Woo-chi, an impish Taoist wizard who becomes an unlikely hero.

In 2014, he starred as an introverted man with dynamic visual acuity who works at a CCTV control center in the comedy film Slow Video, his third collaboration with director Kim Young-tak. This was followed by The Producers in 2015, in which Cha played a hot-headed but soft-hearted television producer.

In 2016, Cha reprised his role in My New Sassy Girl, a sequel to the 2001 hit film. However, the film did not live up to its predecessor and was a failure at the box office. The same year, he reunited with My Sassy Girl co-star Jun Ji-hyun in a cameo appearance in SBS's fantasy drama The Legend of the Blue Sea.

In 2017, Cha starred in the romantic comedy Because I Love You, playing a gifted composer who connects people in love; the film was again produced by his brother Cha Ji-hyun. He next starred in KBS2's variety-drama Hit the Top, which he also directs. The same year, Cha starred in the fantasy blockbuster Along With the Gods: The Two Worlds, based on the webtoon of the same name by Joo Ho-min.

In 2018, Cha starred in the romance drama Matrimonial Chaos, a remake of the Japanese television series of the same title.

=== 2019–present ===
In March 2019, Cha was reported to have engaged in gambling, which was discovered through Jung Joon-young's phone's text messages during the police's investigation of the latter for illicit sex video crimes. Cha subsequently issued a formal statement of apology and withdrew from all his shows.

In 2020, Cha was cast in the crime detective drama Team Bulldog: Off-Duty Investigation.

In 2021, Cha starred in KBS2 drama Police University, playing Yoo Dong-man, a detective-turned-professor at the National Police University.

In March 2025, Cha announced that he ended his exclusive contract with Blossom Entertainment, which he also co-founded, and established a new company with Zo In-sung called Basecamp Company.

== Personal life ==
Cha's father, Cha Jae-wan, was an assistant director for special effects at KBS, and his mother Choi Su-min, now retired, was a voice-over artist. His brother is film producer Cha Ji-hyeon.

On June 1, 2006, Cha married his high school sweetheart, pop lyricist Choi Suk-eun. They dated for 13 years; she was his first and only girlfriend. They have three children, a son (Cha Soo-chan) and two daughters (Cha Tae-eun, Cha Su-jin).

In 2011, Cha revealed on SBS talk show Healing Camp, Aren't You Happy that he has a panic disorder.

== Filmography ==
=== Film ===
Year	Title	Role	Notes	Ref.
1997	Hallelujah	Bad youngster in church	Bit part	
2001	My Sassy Girl	Gyun-woo		
2002	Lovers' Concerto	Lee Ji-hwan		
2003	Crazy First Love	Son Tae-il		
2003	Happy Ero Christmas	Sung Byung-ki		
2004	Who's Got the Tape?	Jap-beom	Cameo	
2004	Windstruck	Man at train station	Cameo	
2004	Two Guys	Kim Hoon		
2005	Sad Movie	Jung Ha-suk		
2005	My Girl and I	Kim Su-ho		
2007	Highway Star	Bong Dal-ho / Bong Pil		
2008	Horton Hears a Who!	Horton the Elephant	Voice role; Korean dub	
2008	BABO	Seung-ryong		
2008	My Mighty Princess	Pigeon man	Cameo	
2008	Scandal Makers	Nam Hyun-soo		
2009	Maybe (Rabbit and Lizard)	Yeong-nam	Cameo	
2009	Triangle		Cameo	
2010	Hello Ghost	Kang Sang-man		
2011	Sunny	Poster model of insurance company	Cameo	
2011	Champ	Seung-ho		
2012	Never Ending Story	Song-kyung's friend	Cameo	
2012	The Grand Heist	Lee Deok-mu		
2013	Steal My Heart	Ho-tae's neighbor	Cameo	
2014	Tazza: The Hidden Card	Radio DJ	Cameo	
2014	The Con Artists	New Technician	Cameo	
2014	Slow Video	Yeo Jang-boo		
2016	My New Sassy Girl	Gyun-woo		
2017	Because I Love You	Lee Hyeong		
2017	Along With the Gods: The Two Worlds	Kim Ja-hong		
2022	The Killer: A Girl Who Deserves to Die	Gangster	Cameo	
2023	My Heart Puppy	Jin-guk		

=== Television series ===
Year	Title	Role	Notes	Ref.
1995	Our Sunny Days of Youth			
1996	Papa	Jang Jung-moon		
1996	Looking Into Each Other's Eyes and Loving Each Other			
1996	Daughter-in-law's Three Kingdoms			
1997	First Love	Chan-woo's friend		
1997	Ready Go!	Park Chan-ki		
1998	Shy Lovers	Hwang In-soo		
1998	Sunflower	Dr. Heo Jae-bong		
1999	Happy Together	Ha Shin-yeop		
1999	I'm Still Loving You	Park Young-jae		
1999	Into the Sunlight	Kang In-ha		
2000	Juliet's Man	Jang Gi-poong		
2004	First Love of a Royal Prince	Choi Gun-hee		
2007	Flowers for My Life	Yoon Ho-sang		
2008	General Hospital 2	Choi Jin-sang		
2011	Lights and Shadows	Drunkard	Cameo; Episode 2	
2012	My Husband Got a Family	Tae-bong	Cameo; Episode 26	
2012	Jeon Woo-chi	Jeon Woo-chi		
2014	Drama Festival – "4teen"	Adult Young-hoon	Cameo	
2015	The Producers	Ra Joon-mo		
2016	Love in the Moonlight	Farm servant	Cameo; Episode 1	
2016	The Legend of the Blue Sea	Han River con-man	Cameo; Episode 4	
2017	Hit the Top	Lee Gwang-jae	Also director	
2018	Matrimonial Chaos	Cho Suk-moo		
2020	Team Bulldog: Off-Duty Investigation	Jin Gang-ho		
2020	Birthcare Center	Nurse Ahn's son	Cameo; Episode 8	
2021	Police University	Yoo Dong-man		
2022	Café Minamdang	Priest	Cameo, episode 10	
2023	Brain Works	Geum Myung-se		
2023	Family: The Unbreakable Bond	Bakery shop owner	Cameo; Episode 1	

=== Web series ===
Year	Title	Role	Ref.
2023	Moving	Jeon Gye-do	

=== Television shows ===
Year	Title	Role	Notes	Ref.
1998	Family Camp	MC		
1998	Happy Saturday	MC		
2012–2019	2 Days & 1 Night	Cast member	Seasons 2–3	
2015	Cool Kiz on The Block	Foot volleyball member, guest swimmer, cycling candidate		
2016	Gura Chacha Time Slip - New Boy			
2017	Dragon Club – Childish Bromance	Cast member		
2018–2019	Radio Star	Host		
2018	Where on Earth??	Cast member		
2020	Hometown Flex	MC		
2021–2023	Unexpected Business	MC	with Zo In-sung (Seasons 1–3)	
2021	National Bang Bang Cook Cook	Cast member		
2021	Wild Idol	Panelist		
2021	Many Chat	MC	with Yoo Hee-yeol	
2022	Famous Singers	Daily MC		
2022	Suspicious Bookstore East West South Book	Host		
2023	Golf Battle: Birdie Buddies	Cast Member	Season 5	
2023	Express Delivery Mongolia Edition	Cast Member		
2024	Apartment 404	Cast Member		
2024–2025	Handsome Guys	Cast member		

=== Hosting ===
Year	Title	Notes	Ref.
2000	Mnet KM Music Festival	with Kim Hyun-joo	
2001	Mnet KM Music Festival	with Song Hye-kyo	
2002	Campus Song Festival	with Yoon Do-hyun	
2003	Campus Song Festival	with Lee Hyori	
2003	Mnet KM Music Festival	with Sung Yu-ri	
2007	Campus Song Festival	with Lee Hyori	

=== Radio shows ===
Year	Title	Role	Notes	Ref.
1999–2000	FM Popular Music with Cha Tae-hyun	DJ	KBS Cool FM	
2007–2008	Mr. Radio	DJ	KBS Cool FM	

== Discography ==
=== Studio albums ===
List of studio albums, with selected details, chart positions, and sales
Title	Album details	Peak chart positions	Sales
Title	Album details	KOR	Sales
Accident	Released: February 12, 2001; Label: SidusHQ, Yejeon Media; Formats: CD, cassette; Track listing: 1. 諦念(체념); 2. I Love You; 3. 생일선물; 4. 아름다운사람(미); 5. 그래..; 6. 마지막 하루; 7. 몰라도 돼 8. 너의 그림자 뒤에; 9. 부탁; 10. 친구와 연인; 11. 미망; 12. 이 계절이 지나도; 13. 피크닉; 14. I Love You (re-mix); 15. The Last Day (instrumental)	3	KOR: 275,632
THE [BU:K]	Released: May 2, 2003; Label: SidusHQ, Yejeon Media; Formats: CD, cassette; Track listing: 1. 별을 사랑한 어린왕자의 꿈 2. Again To Me; 3. Love Story; 4. 용서 (容恕); 5. 슬픈 이별 뒤로; 6. I Can Wating For You; 7. 고마워 그리고 행복해; 8. 사랑 느낌; 9. 바보야; 10. 사진; 11. 언제나 지금처럼; 12. Summer Story; 13. 용서 (Interlude); 14. 슬픈 이별 뒤로 (RE-MIX); 15. (Bonus Data)	6	KOR: 72,735

=== Extended plays ===
List of extended plays, with selected details, chart positions, and sales
Title	Album details	Peak chart positions	Sales
Title	Album details	KOR	Sales
Hong Cha Project (with Hong Kyung-min)	Released: May 27, 2016; Label: Blossom Entertainment, 24th Street; Formats: Digital download; Track listing: 1. Cheer Up; 2. All Right; 3. Cheer Up (Instrumental); 4. All Right (Instrumental)	—	—N/a
"—" denotes releases that did not chart or were not released in that region.

=== Singles ===
==== As lead artist ====
List of singles, with year, and album
Title	Year	Album
"I Wait Every Day" (매일 매일 기다려) (with Hong Kyung-min)	2016	Immortal Songs: Singing the Legend OST
"Archive People" (with Hong Kyung-min) (feat. Samuel)	2019	Non-album single

==== Soundtrack appearances ====
List of singles, with year, and album
Title	Year	Album
"Where Shall We Go?" (어디로 갈까?)	2000	Juliet's Man OST
"Dignity #301" (기품)	2000	Juliet's Man OST
"Cabbage Worm" (배추벌레)	2000	Juliet's Man OST
"I Don't Know" (모르나요)	2002	Lovers' Concerto OST
"Photograph" (사진)	2002	Lovers' Concerto OST
"Seeing My First Love" (첫사랑 보고서)	2003	Crazy First Love OST
"The Girl Who's So Pretty to Me" (내겐 너무 이쁜 그녀)	2003	Crazy First Love OST
"Forget Me" (잊어요)	2005	Sad Movie OST
"Don't Let Go of My Hand" (내 손을 놓지 마요)	2005	Sad Movie OST
"Closing My Eyes" (눈을 감고)	2006	My Girl and I OST
"Two-Lane Bridge" (이차선 다리)	2007	Highway Star OST
"Wind Wind Wind" (바람바람바람)	2007	Highway Star OST
"Waiting Everyday" (매일 매일 기다려)	2007	Highway Star OST
"Because I Love You"	2008	Scandal Makers OST
"With You" (너와 함께)	2010	Hello Ghost OST
"Happiness" (행복)	2011	Champ OST
"Bygone Days" (지난날)	2016	Because I Love You OST
"Near Parting" (이별근처)	2018	Matrimonial Chaos OST
"Takedown" (with Hong Kyung-min)	2020	Team Bulldog: Off-Duty Investigation OST
"And, Go On" (with Kim Jong-kook, Hong Kyung-min, Hong Kyung-in, Jang Hyuk & Kang Hoon)	2023	Express Delivery: Mongolia Edition OST

== Awards and nominations ==
Name of the award ceremony, year presented, category, nominee of the award, and the result of the nomination
Award ceremony	Year	Category	Nominee / Work	Result	Ref.
Baeksang Arts Awards	1999	Best New Actor – Television	Sunflower	Won	
Baeksang Arts Awards	2002	Best New Actor – Film	My Sassy Girl	Nominated	
Baeksang Arts Awards	2011	Best Actor – Film	Hello Ghost	Nominated	
Blue Dragon Film Awards	2001	Best New Actor	My Sassy Girl	Won	
Blue Dragon Film Awards	2002	Popular Star Award	Lovers' Concerto	Won	
Blue Dragon Film Awards	2003	Popular Star Award	Crazy First Love	Won	
Golden Cinema Film Festival	2002	Best New Actor	My Sassy Girl	Won	
Golden Cinema Film Festival	2023	Popularity Award Selected By The Cinematographer	My Heart Puppy	Won	
Grand Bell Awards	2002	Popularity Award	My Sassy Girl	Won	
Grand Bell Awards	2002	Best Actor	My Sassy Girl	Nominated	
Grand Bell Awards	2008	Overseas Popularity Award	BABO	Won	
Grand Bell Awards	2011	Best Actor	Hello Ghost	Nominated	
KBS Drama Awards	2007	Top Excellence Award, Actor	Flowers for My Life	Nominated	
KBS Drama Awards	2012	Excellence Award, Actor in a Mid-length Drama	Jeon Woo-chi	Nominated	
KBS Drama Awards	2015	Best Couple Award	Cha Tae-hyun (with Kim Soo-hyun and Gong Hyo-jin); The Producers	Won	
KBS Drama Awards	2015	Excellence Award, Actor in a Mid-length Drama	The Producers	Won	
KBS Drama Awards	2018	Best Couple Award	Cha Tae-hyun (with Bae Doona); Matrimonial Chaos	Won	
KBS Drama Awards	2018	Grand Prize (Daesang)	Matrimonial Chaos	Nominated	
KBS Drama Awards	2018	Top Excellence Award, Actor	Matrimonial Chaos	Won	
KBS Drama Awards	2018	Excellence Award, Actor in a Miniseries	Matrimonial Chaos	Nominated	
KBS Drama Awards	2021	Best Couple Award	Cha Tae-hyun (with Jinyoung); Police University	Won	
KBS Drama Awards	2021	Grand Prize (Daesang)	Police University	Nominated	
KBS Drama Awards	2021	Top Excellence Award, Actor	Police University	Won	
KBS Drama Awards	2021	Excellence Award, Actor in a Miniseries	Police University	Nominated	
KBS Entertainment Awards	2007	Best Radio DJ	Mr. Radio	Won	
KBS Entertainment Awards	2012	Top Entertainer Award	2 Days & 1 Night	Won	
KBS Entertainment Awards	2013	Top Excellence Award in a Show/Variety	2 Days & 1 Night	Won	
KBS Entertainment Awards	2014	Grand Prize (Daesang)	2 Days & 1 Night	Nominated	
KBS Entertainment Awards	2015	Grand Prize (Daesang)	2 Days & 1 Night	Nominated	
KBS Super Talent Contest	1995	Silver Medal	Cha Tae-hyun	Won	
Korea World Youth Film Festival	2018	Popular Actor Award	Cha Tae-hyun	Won	
Max Movie Awards	2009	Best Actor	Scandal Makers	Won	
MBC Drama Awards	1999	Best New Actor	I'm Still Loving You, Into the Sunlight	Won	
MBC Drama Awards	1999	TV Actor of the Year (Netizens)	I'm Still Loving You, Into the Sunlight	Won	
MBC Drama Awards	2004	Top Excellence Award, Actor	First Love of a Royal Prince	Nominated	
MBC Drama Awards	2008	Excellence Award, Actor	General Hospital 2	Nominated	
MBC Entertainment Awards	2018	Excellence Award, Music/Talk Category (Male)	Radio Star	Won	
SBS Drama Awards	1999	Best New Actor	Happy Together	Won	
SBS Drama Awards	2000	Big Star Award	Juliet's Man	Won	
SBS Drama Awards	2000	Popularity Award	Juliet's Man	Won	
SBS Drama Awards	2000	SBSi Award	Juliet's Man	Won	
SBS Drama Awards	2000	Excellence Award, Actor	Juliet's Man	Nominated	

=== State honors ===
Name of country or organization, year given, and name of honor or award
Country or organization	Year	Honor / Award	Ref.
Savings Day	2005	Presidential Citation	
Taxpayers' Day	2016	Beautiful Taxpayers	

=== Listicles ===
Name of publisher, year listed, name of listicle, and placement
Publisher	Year	Listicle	Placement	Ref.
Forbes	2010	Korea Power Celebrity 40	37th	
The Screen	2009	1984–2008 Top Box Office Powerhouse Actors in Korean Movies	27th	
The Screen	2019	2009–2019 Top Box Office Powerhouse Actors in Korean Movies	20th	
Korean Film Council	2021	Korean Actors 200 (Note: Introduces 200 actors that best represent the present and future of Korean cinema to the people in the film industry all over the world)	Included	
