= Ko Chang-seok =

South Korean actor (born 1970)

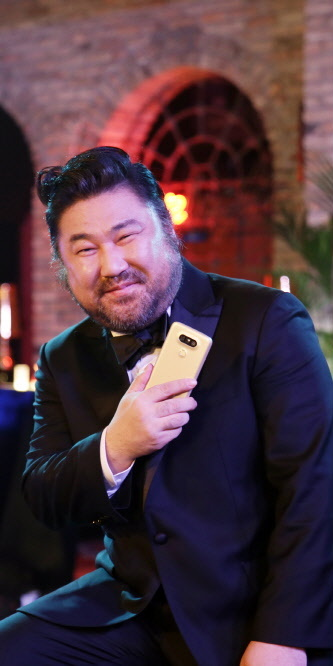
- Ko in 2016
- Born: October 13, 1970 (age 56); Yongdang-dong, Nam-gu, Busan, South Korea
- Other name: Go Chang-suk
- Education: Seoul Institute of the Arts – Theater
- Occupation: Actor
- Years active: 2001–present
- Agent: Billions
- Spouse: Lee Jung-eun
- Children: 1

Korean name
- Hangul: 고창석
- Hanja: 高昌錫
- RR: Go Changseok
- MR: Ko Ch'angsŏk

Ko Chang-seok (born October 13, 1970) is a South Korean actor known primarily for his supporting roles in film and television, notably, Rough Cut (2008), Secret Reunion (2010), Encounter (2018–19), and Melo Movie (2025).

== Career ==
Ko began his career on stage, performing in plays and musicals for many years before moving on to bit parts in films. He once earned his living by working on farms and in iron foundries, then acquired fame through his scene-stealing roles in Jang Hoon's films, notably as the movie director in Rough Cut (2008), and the Vietnamese gang boss in Secret Reunion (2010). He has since become one of the busiest supporting actors in Korean cinema.

Ko's real-life wife and daughter played his character's family in the period film The Showdown (2011).

== Filmography ==
=== Film ===
Year	English title	Korean title	Role
2001	Superman in Early Summer (short film)	이른 여름, 슈퍼맨	Superman
2004	The Last Wolf	마지막 늑대	Narrow Eyes
2005	Sympathy for Lady Vengeance	친절한 금자씨	Woo So-young's husband
2006	Running Wild	야수	Gang member
2006	The Host	괴물	Orderly 1 in isolation ward
2006	Ice Bar	아이스케키	Cop 1
2006	No Mercy for the Rude	예의없는 것들	Piano
2007	Soo	수	Yakuza 1
2007	Going by the Book	바르게 살자	Woo Jong-dae
2008	Rough Cut	영화는 영화다	Director Bong
2008	Outing	소풍	Go Pil-joong
2008	Antique	서양골동양과자점 앤티크	Gay club master
2009	Insadong Scandal	인사동 스캔들	Hojinsa, forgery factory president
2009	The Case of Itaewon Homicide	이태원 살인사건	Alex's father
2009	City of Fathers	부산 – 父.山	Kim Kang-soo
2010	Secret Reunion	의형제	Vietnamese gang boss
2010	A Barefoot Dream	맨발의 꿈	Park In-gi
2010	Second Half	맛있는 인생	Sushi restaurant owner Mr. Ko – cameo
2010	Hello Ghost	헬로우 고스트	Chain-smoking ghost
2011	The Showdown	혈투	Du-soo
2011	My Black Mini Dress	마이 블랙 미니드레스	Director – cameo
2011	The Front Line	고지전	Yang Hyo-sam
2011	Quick	퀵	Detective Seo
2011	Mr. Idol	Mr. 아이돌	Han Jong-tak
2012	Over My Dead Body	시체가 돌아왔다	Hwang Sung-koo
2012	Miss Conspirator	미스 고	Detective So
2012	The Suck Up Project: Mr. XXX-Kisser	아부의 왕	Sung-cheol
2012	Dangerously Excited	나는 공무원이다	Music judge – cameo
2012	The Grand Heist	바람과 함께 사라지다	Hong Seok-chang
2012	Almost Che	강철대오: 구국의 철가방	Police officer Kim
2013	Secretly, Greatly	은밀하게 위대하게	Seo Sang-gu
2013	The Spy: Undercover Operation	스파이	Department head Jin
2013	The Face Reader	관상	His Excellency Choi – cameo
2014	The Huntresses	조선미녀 삼총사	Mu-myeong ("No Name")
2014	Tabloid Truth	찌라시: 위험한 소문	Baek Moon
2014	Slow Video	슬로우 비디오	Doctor Seok
2014	The Con Artists	기술자들	Goo-in
2016	Seondal: The Man Who Sells the River	봉이 김선달	Bo-won
2017	A Taxi Driver	택시운전사	Sang-goo's father - special appearance
2018	Be with You	지금 만나러 갑니다	Hong-goo
2019	Jesters: The Game Changers		
2019	Race to Freedom: Um Bok Dong	자전차왕 엄복동	
2020	Innocence	결백	Seedsman
2021	Sinkhole	싱크홀	Rescue caption
2021	Miracle: Letters to the President	기적	Father of Ra-hee (Special appearance)
2022	I Want to Know Your Parents	니 부모 얼굴이 보고 싶다	Jung
2022	Project Wolf Hunting	늑대사냥	Go Kun-bae
2022	Broker	브로커	Go Gwang-soo
2022	Life Is Beautiful	인생은 아름다워	
2023	Count	권혁재	Principal
2023	Dream	드림	Jeon Hyo-bong
2025	Boss	보스	

=== Television series ===
Year	English title	Korean title	Role
2009	Dream	드림	Straw
2013	Ad Genius Lee Tae-baek	광고천재 이태백	Ma Jin-ga
2013	Monstar	몬스타	Judo master – cameo, ep. 5
2013	Good Doctor	굿 닥터	Jo Jung-mi
2014	Diary of a Night Watchman	야경꾼일지	Minister Ddoong
2015	Kill Me, Heal Me	킬미,힐미	Seok Ho-pil
2015	Reply 1988	응답하라	Mi-ok's father
2017	Hit the Top	최고의 한방	Photographer – cameo, ep. 1
2018	The Miracle We Met	우리가 만난 기적	Song Hyun-chul (B)
2018	Encounter	남자친구	Nam Myeong-sik
2020	Memorist	메모리스트	Gu Kyung-tan
2022	Today's Webtoon	오늘의 웹툰	On Gi-bong
2022	The Good Detective 2	모범형사 2	Cha Moon-ho – cameo, ep. 11
2022	Glitch	글리치	Kim Chan-woo
2024	The Impossible Heir	로얄로더	Chae Dong-Uk
2024	Chicken Nugget	닭강정	Ko Baek-Joong's dad
2025	Melo Movie	멜로무비	Ma Sang-woo
2025	My Dearest Nemesis	그놈은 흑염룡	Baek Won-seop
2025	Way Back Love	내가 죽기 일주일 전	Jeong Il-beom
2026	Dead-End Job	꿀알바	Construction Site Foreman – cameo, ep. 6

=== Television shows ===
Year	Title	Role	Ref.
2022	Take Care of Me This Week	Main Cast	

== Theater ==
Year	English title	Korean title	Role	Notes/Ref.
2003	Tale of Ungnyeo	웅녀 이야기		
2006	Sachoom	사랑하면 춤을 춰라		
2012	The Cherry Orchard	벚꽃동상		
2012	The Human Comedy	휴먼코미디		
2012	Woyzeck	보이첵		2013
2012	Sachoom	사랑한다면 춤을 춰라		
2012	A Midsummer Night's Dream	여름밤의 꿈		
2012	Godspell	가스펠		
2012	Dulpul	들풀		
2012	Jang Bogo, the Sea God	해상왕 장보고		
2012	Le Passe-Muraille	벽을 뚫는 남자	Prosecutor	2013, 2015–2016
2014	Kinky Boots	킹키부츠	Don	2022
2023	Dream High	드림하이	Principal	

== Accolades ==
=== Awards and nominations ===
Year	Award	Category	Nominated work	Result
2008	KMDb초 이워스 Awards	Best Supporting Actor	Rough Cut	Won
2008	29th Blue Dragon Film Awards	Best Supporting Actor	Rough Cut	Nominated
2008	7th Korean Film Awards	Best Supporting Actor	Rough Cut	Nominated
2010	18th Chunsa Film Art Awards	Best Supporting Actor	A Barefoot Dream	Won
2010	47th Grand Bell Awards	Best Supporting Actor	A Barefoot Dream	Nominated
2010	31st Blue Dragon Film Awards	Best Supporting Actor	Secret Reunion	Nominated
2011	20th Buil Film Awards	Best Supporting Actor	The Front Line	Won
2011	48th Grand Bell Awards	Best Supporting Actor	The Showdown	Nominated
2011	32nd Blue Dragon Film Awards	Best Supporting Actor	The Front Line	Nominated
2013	7th The Musical Awards	Best Supporting Actor	Le Passe-Muraille	Nominated
2013	KBS Drama Awards	Best Supporting Actor	Good Doctor, Ad Genius Lee Tae-baek	Nominated

=== Listicles ===
Name of publisher, year listed, name of listicle, and placement
Publisher	Year	Listicle	Placement	Ref.
Korean Film Council	2021	Korean Actors 200 (Note: Introduces 200 actors that best represent the present and future of Korean cinema to the people in the film industry all over the world.)	Included	
