= Highway Star (film) =

- Theatrical poster
- Directed by: Kim Sang-chan; Kim Hyun-soo
- Written by: Seon Seung-yeon; Yun Sun-yong; Kim Sang-chan
- Based on: Sharan Q no enka no hanamichi by Hiroshi Saito
- Produced by: Lee Kyung-kyu; Park Se-jun; Kim Woo-sang
- Starring: Cha Tae-hyun; Im Chae-moo; Lee So-yeon
- Cinematography: Yoon Hong-sik
- Edited by: Kyung Min-ho
- Music by: Ju Young-hoon
- Distributed by: Studio 2.0
- Release date: February 14, 2007
- Running time: 114 minutes
- Country: South Korea
- Language: Korean
- Budget: US$5.07 million
- Box office: US$11.7 million

Highway Star (Korean: 복면달호; RR: Bongmyeondalho) is a 2007 South Korean musical comedy film starring Cha Tae-hyun as an aspiring rocker who achieves success as a masked trot singer.

A remake of the 1997 Japanese film Sharan Q Takes Center Stage of Enka (シャ乱Qの演歌の花道, Sharan Q no enka no hanamichi), Highway Star was a modest hit at the box office, receiving 1,611,192 admissions and earning US$11.7 million.

== Plot ==
Bong Dal-ho's ultimate dream is to become a famous rock star. To make a living in his small, rural town, Dal-ho's heavy metal rock band is forced to play trot (country music similar to enka, also known as bbong jjak) in tacky nightclubs. One day, Jang Joon, executive of a shabby record company, sees potential in the seemingly clueless vocalist and promises to make him a star—Dal-ho realizes too late that he's been duped into signing a contract with a label that specializes in trot music.

Jang believes that Dal-ho's talent as a trot singer is in reflecting the melodramatic sentimentality of middle-aged Koreans (the genre's target demographic), but Dal-ho persistently believes that trot music, along with the gaudy costumes and hairstyles and exaggerated stage movements associated with it, is outdated and trite.

So on his televised singing debut as a trot singer, Dal-ho wears a mask out of shame. However, the strange strategy works; his voice rocks the nation and his album sales climb the music charts. His mysterious masked face had only increased the public's curiosity about the new star, doubling his popularity.

As Jang continues to train him, Dal-ho gradually begins to see the beauty of trot, thanks to the help of his colleagues, especially Cha Seo-yeon, an attractive trot singer with a strong passion for music but little talent. Dal-ho realizes that what's important is not which genre he chooses but whether he sings with all his heart. But he also undergoes an identity crisis, wondering if he would remain a star without the mask.

== Cast ==
- Cha Tae-hyun as Bong Dal-ho/Bong Pil
- Im Chae-moo as Jang Joon
- Lee So-yeon as Cha Seo-yeon
- Lee Byung-joon as Na Tae-song
- Park Seon-woo as Hae-chul
- Jung Suk-yong as Jo Seung-ho
- Park Young-seo as Hae-chul
- Jung Seong-woo as good looking guy
- Ah Yong-joo as Seo Deuk-nam
- Kim Hyeong-ja as Dal-ho's mother
- Kim Ki-hyeon as Chairman Choi
- Lee Seung-heon as Lee Dae-chil
- Jeong Gi-seop as detective
- Im Se-mi as Chairman Choi's daughter
- Yoo Jung-hyun as music award MC
- Kim Ji-young as bar girl 2
- Lee Ha-eun as bar girl 4
- Seol Ji-yoon as Madam
- Da Eun as university student
- Kim Ik-tae
- Lee Kyung-kyu as vocal trainer (ending scene)
