= Slow Video =

- Theatrical poster
- Directed by: Kim Young-tak
- Written by: Kim Young-tak
- Produced by: Yu Jae-hyeok
- Starring: Cha Tae-hyun; Nam Sang-mi
- Cinematography: Kim Gi-tae
- Edited by: Kim Sun-min
- Music by: Min Chan-hong
- Production companies: Fox International Productions; Our Joyful Young Days Film Co.
- Distributed by: 20th Century Fox Korea
- Release date: October 2, 2014
- Running time: 106 minutes
- Country: South Korea
- Language: Korean
- Box office: ₩4.3 billion

Slow Video (Korean: 슬로우 비디오) is a 2014 South Korean comedy film written and directed by Kim Young-tak, starring Cha Tae-hyun and Nam Sang-mi.

It is the second Korean film to be fully financed by American studio 20th Century Fox.

== Plot ==
Yeo Jang-boo possesses dynamic visual acuity, which enables him to visually discern fine detail in a moving object that ordinary people cannot, as if he's seeing the world in slow motion. Due to his special ability, Jang-boo has to constantly wear sunglasses, which made him a target of bullying at school and throughout his childhood. He spends 20 years isolated and alone, but his talent proves to be a gift later in life when he finally goes out into the world and ends up working at his neighbor's CCTV control center. One day while unenthusiastically watching passersby onscreen, he spots his first love Bong Soo-mi. Despite being terrible at social interactions, Jang-boo sets out to win her heart.

== Cast ==
- Cha Tae-hyun as Yeo Jang-boo
- Nam Sang-mi as Bong Soo-mi
- Oh Dal-su as Byeong-soo
- Ko Chang-seok as Doctor Seok
- Jin Kyung as Old maid Shim
- Lee Yoo-young as Yeo Jang-mi
- Kim Hyeon
- Kim Kang-hyeon as Sang-man
- Jung Yun-seok as Kim Baek-goo
- Choi Seong-won as Loan shark
- Kwak Jin-moo as Director Mo
- Hwang Seung-eon as Heroine

== Box office ==
The film was released on October 2, 2014. For its three-day opening weekend, Slow Video recorded 546,873 admissions and grossed ₩4.3 billion, placing it second on the box office chart, behind Whistle Blower. It drew a total of 1.17 million admissions for the month of October.
