= Two Guys (film) =

- Directed by: Hun-Su Park
- Written by: Hun-Su Park
- Produced by: Weon-jang Jo
- Starring: Park Joong-hoon; Cha Tae-hyun; Han Eun-jung
- Cinematography: Jae-Hyeong Park
- Edited by: Sung-Won Hahm
- Music by: Yun-seong Jo
- Release date: 9 July 2004
- Running time: 116 minutes
- Country: South Korea
- Language: Korean

Two Guys (Korean: Tu gaijeu) is a South Korean comedy film directed and written by Hun-Su Park. Park Joong-hoon, Cha Tae-hyun, and Han Eun-jung are the lead stars in this film. Variety praised the film's action setpieces, calling it "surprisingly engaging".

== Plot ==
Debt collector Park (Park Joong-hoon) is sent to collect from valet Hun (Cha Tae-hyun), but the two end up stealing a car full of high-tech semiconductors. Chased down by the mafia and the South Korean secret service, they must outwit them with the help of professional criminal Ji-seon (Han Eun-hung).

== Cast ==
- Park Joong-hoon as Jung-tae
- Cha Tae-hyun as Hoon
- Han Eun-jung as Ji-seon
- Heung-chae Jeong as Eul-Baek
- Dae-han Ji as Yong-Sik
- Jun-yong Choi as Yang-Bok
- Son Hyun-joo as Vice-Chief Lim
- Shin Seung-hwan as Soo-Hun
- Lee Hyuk-jae as RZ Card
- Yun-bae Park as customer
- Lim Seung-Dae as Vice-Chief Jung
- Kim Ku-Taek as Rin
- Hong Jin-Kyung as cameo
- Park In-hwan as Director Lee (cameo)
