= Chun Bo-geun =

South Korean actor (born 2002)

- Born: August 23, 2002 (age 24); Seongnam, Gyeonggi Province, South Korea
- Occupation: Actor
- Years active: 2008–present

Korean name
- Hangul: 천보근
- RR: Cheon Bogeun
- MR: Ch'ŏn Pogŭn

Chun Bo-geun (Korean: 천보근; born August 23, 2002) is a South Korean actor. He first garnered attention in a KTF commercial in 2008, then began his career as a child actor in 2009. Chun has starred in the films Hello Ghost (2010) and The Grand Heist (2012), as well as the television series Wish Upon a Star (2010) and The Queen's Classroom (2013).

== Filmography ==
=== Film ===
Year	Title	Role	Notes
2009	Tidal Wave	Choi Seung-hyun	
2010	No Doubt	Do-jin	
2010	Hello Ghost	Elementary school student ghost	
2011	Sorry, Thanks	Min-joon	segment: "Cat's Kiss"
2011	The Bracelet of Blue Tears	young Ji-gwi	
2012	Dancing Queen	young Hwang Jung-min	
2012	The Grand Heist	Jung-goon	
2012	The Spies	Section chief Kim's son	
2013	The Spy: Undercover Operation	Ji-seong	
2014	The Fatal Encounter	young Sal-soo	

=== Television series ===
Year	Title	Role
2010	Stars Falling from the Sky	Jin Pa-rang
2010	Gloria	Ha Eo-jin
2011	You're So Pretty	Jang Soo-ho
2011	TV Original Fairy Tale: Child Carrying Bag	Seok-woo
2012	Dream of the Emperor	Manhwa
2012	The Great Seer	Patron saint
2013	The Queen's Classroom	Oh Dong-gu
2014	Drama Festival: 4teen	Shin Young-hoon

=== Variety show ===
Year	Title	Notes
2009	Fun TV Roller Coaster	segment: "Two Wives and Two Husbands"
2009	Star Golden Bell	
2012	Breakdown Problem – Resolution King	Host
2014	Little Big Hero	Documentary narration, episode 3

=== Music video appearances ===
Year	Song title	Artist
2011	"Sorry, Thanks"	Migo Song
2013	"Green Rain"	Shinee

== Awards and nominations ==
Year	Award	Category	Nominated work	Result
2013	2nd APAN Star Awards	Best Young Actor	The Queen's Classroom	Won
2013	MBC Drama Awards	Best Young Actor	The Queen's Classroom	Won
