= The Spy: Undercover Operation =

- Hangul: 스파이
- RR: Seupai
- MR: Sŭp'ai
- Directed by: Lee Seung-jun
- Written by: Park Soo-jin; Yoon Je-kyoon
- Story by: Min Ji-eun
- Produced by: Lee Sang-jik; Lee Han-seung; Choi Yun-ho
- Starring: Sul Kyung-gu; Moon So-ri; Daniel Henney; Go Chang-seok
- Cinematography: Choi Jin-woong
- Edited by: Shin Min-kyung
- Music by: Jeong Jin-ho
- Distributed by: CJ Entertainment
- Release date: September 5, 2013
- Running time: 121 minutes
- Country: South Korea
- Language: Korean
- Budget: US$8.9 million
- Box office: US$22.5 million

The Spy: Undercover Operation (Korean: 스파이; RR: Seupai; lit. 'Spy') is a 2013 South Korean action comedy film about an agent (Sul Kyung-gu) who is undercover in a foreign country while his wife (Moon So-ri) has no idea what he does for a living.

The early working title was Mister K (미스터K).

== Plot ==
Chul-soo is a secret agent in South Korea, who is also a loving husband to his flight attendant wife Young-hee, but hides his true profession and makes her to think that he is a normal office worker. One day, Chul-soo tells his wife that he is going to Busan for a business trip, but is actually travelling with his department head Jin to Bangkok, Thailand to carry out a top secret operation with national ramifications. In Bangkok, Chul-soo spots Young-hee (who is supposed to be in Korea) with a good-looking man named Ryan. Shocked, Chul-soo decides to complete his mission, while also decides to follow his wife, fearing that she will ditch him for Ryan.

== Cast ==
- Sul Kyung-gu - Chul-soo
- Moon So-ri - Young-hee
- Daniel Henney - Ryan
- Go Chang-seok - Jin
- Han Ye-ri - Baek Seol-hee
- Ra Mi-ran - Yakult
- Jung In-gi - CEO Yeom
- Song Jae-ho - South Korean president
- Chun Bo-geun - Ji-seong
- Kim Ji-young - Chul-soo's mother
- Dean Dawson - CIA agent
- Kahlid Elijah Tapia - CIA agent
- Philip Waslin - Russian president
- Kim So-jin - Situation room staff 2
- Cha Soon-bae - Assistant chief of staff for operations

== Controversy ==
Lee Myung-se was originally attached as the film's director, then-titled Mister K. In May 2012, production company JK Film (run by CEO/film director Yoon Je-kyoon) filed a copyright lawsuit against Lee, claiming he had "illegally and secretly registered" himself as the film's copyright holder through the Korea Copyright Commission website after he quit the project in April 2012. The legal battle was sparked after JK Film had a series of conflicts with Lee over the film's concept. Cineastes and critics had been excited about the rare collaboration between Lee and Yoon ― two influential figures in the Korean film industry who are very different from each other. Yoon is known for his commercial blockbusters Haeundae (2009) and Sector 7 (2011), while Lee is famous for his aesthetically conscious mise-en-scene and style shown in Duelist (2005) and M (2007). However, the producers and Lee had several artistic and creative differences during the early days of shooting in South Korea and Thailand. JK Film alleged that Lee refused to follow the original script, making significant deviations that were no longer appropriate to an action adventure film, and completely ignored every cinematic and stylistic request from the producer: "The film was going to be an action comedy with realistic characters, something like the James Bond series. But director Lee got rid of entire script lines and shot each scene in a rather serene and lyrical way. They weren't what we initially had in mind as its producers." JK Film resumed shooting in mid-May 2012, and Lee was replaced by rookie filmmaker Lee Seung-jun (he was assistant director for two of JK Film's blockbusters Haeundae and Quick).

Director Lee Myung-se and his company, Production M, did not comment.
