= The Grand Heist =

2012 South Korean historical comedy film

- Promotional poster for The Grand Heist
- Hangul: 바람과 함께 사라지다
- RR: Baramgwa hamkke sarajida
- MR: Paramgwa hamkke sarajida
- Directed by: Kim Joo-ho
- Written by: Kim Min-sung
- Produced by: Oh Jeong-hyun
- Starring: Cha Tae-hyun; Oh Ji-ho; Min Hyo-rin; Lee Chae-young; Sung Dong-il; Ko Chang-seok; Shin Jung-geun
- Cinematography: Lee Seong-jae
- Edited by: Steve M. Choi
- Music by: Kim Tae-seong
- Production companies: AD406 and DHUTA
- Distributed by: Next Entertainment World
- Release date: 8 August 2012
- Running time: 121 minutes
- Country: South Korea
- Language: Korean
- Budget: ₩8.5 billion
- Box office: US$30.2 million

The Grand Heist (Korean: 바람과 함께 사라지다; lit. 'Gone With the Wind') is a 2012 South Korean heist action comedy film about a gang of 11 thieves who try to steal ice blocks from the royal storage, Seobingo, during the last years of the Joseon era. It was released on August 8, 2012.

== Plot ==
In the late 18th century of the Joseon period (1392–1910), during the last years of King Yeongjo's reign, ice is a commodity more valuable than gold. Blocks of it are harvested from frozen rivers in winter, put in royal storage and distributed or sold throughout the year for general consumption. When corrupt officials conspire to form a monopoly and fix its price, a gang of 11 professionals is formed to stop the scheme — and to do that, they must make all of the royal ice blocks in five storage rooms disappear for a night.

== Cast ==
- Cha Tae-hyun – Lee Deok-mu, the intelligent bastard son of the minister of the right, the court's only clean official. The laid-back bookseller initially chases pretty girls and rare exotic books, but after his father is falsely accused of a crime by his political rival, Deok-mu becomes the leader of the heist gang.
- Oh Ji-ho – Baek Dong-soo, a trained soldier and ousted chief guard of the royal ice storage
- Min Hyo-rin – Baek Soo-ryun, a diver and Dong-soo's sister
- Lee Chae-young – Seol-hwa, a spy-gisaeng
- Sung Dong-il – Jang Soo-gyun, the chief financial backer of the gang
- Ko Chang-seok – Seok-chang, a grave-digging specialist
- Shin Jung-geun – Dae-hyun, a near-deaf explosives maker
- Kim Gil-dong – Cheol-joo
- Chun Bo-geun – Jung-goon, the "idea bank"
- Kim Hyang-gi – Nan-i, a rumor-spreader
- Song Jong-ho – Jae-joon, a master of disguises
- Nam Kyeong-eup – Jo Myung-soo, the minister of the left who wants to monopolize the ice in Seobingo
- Kim Ku-taek – Jo Young-cheol
- Oh Na-ra – Jo Myung-soo's concubine
- Lee Moon-sik – Mr. Yang (cameo)
- Song Joong-ki – older Jung-goon (cameo)

== Reception ==
The film drew 4 million viewers in just 19 days after its release, becoming the seventh homegrown movie in Korea to achieve the feat in 2012. Its total admissions is at a little over 4.9 million.

The film ranked second and grossed ₩9,615,802,659 in its first week of release, and grossed a total of ₩33,693,067,319 domestically after five weeks of screening.

== Awards and nominations ==
- 2012 Grand Bell Awards: Nominated, Best New Director – Kim Joo-ho
- 2013 Fantasporto Orient Express Awards: Best Film
