= Villain and Widow =

2010 South Korean film

- Hangul: 이층의 악당
- Hanja: 二層의 惡黨
- RR: Icheungui akdang
- MR: Ich'ŭngŭi aktang
- Directed by: Son Jae-gon
- Written by: Son Jae-gon
- Produced by: Choi Pyung-ho
- Starring: Han Suk-kyu; Kim Hye-soo
- Cinematography: Choi Sang-ho
- Edited by: Shin Min-kyung
- Music by: Kim Jun-seong; Lee Jin-hee
- Production company: Sidus-Benex Cinema Fund1
- Distributed by: Sidus FNH
- Release date: November 25, 2010
- Running time: 115 minutes
- Country: South Korea
- Language: Korean
- Box office: US$$3.7 million

Villain and Widow (Korean: 이층의 악당; RR: Icheungui akdang; lit. 'Villain on the Second Floor') is a 2010 South Korean crime comedy film written and directed by Son Jae-gon about a depressed widow who rents out a room to a suspicious man who claims to be a novelist.

== Plot ==
Yeon-joo, a depressed widow, lives with her bad-tempered daughter, Seong-ah, who's an ex-child model but is now being bullied in school. Things become worse when she starts to experience financial problems. Now deep in debt, Yeon-joo decides to rent out a room in her house to a mysterious man named Chang-in who introduces himself as a novelist. Unbeknownst to her, Chang-in is a thief who's trying to get his hands on a set of Ming Dynasty tea utensils that her deceased husband stole.

== Cast ==
- Han Suk-kyu as Chang-in
- Kim Hye-soo as Ham Yeon-joo
- Ji Woo as Ham Seong-ah
- Kim Ki-cheon as Seong-sik
- Lee Yong-nyeo as Next door neighbor
- Lee Jang-woo as Constable Oh
- Oh Jae-gyun as Section chief Song
- Um Ki-joon as Representative Ha
- Shin Dongho as Hyun-chul
- Park Won-sang as Ham Ki-soo
- Park Hyuk-kwon as Manager Jo
- Yoon Hee-seok as Doctor Nam
- Bae Jang-soo as Owner of real estate agency

== Production ==
In 2009, the film was given the Lotte Award and received US$8,550 in funding at the Asian Project Market (then-called Pusan Promotion Plan) of the 14th Busan International Film Festival.

== Reception ==
Russell Edwards of Variety called it "amusing if overlong." James Mudge of Beyond Hollywood described it as "a breath of fresh air" that "[refuses] to comply with the usual tired genre clichés." Pierce Conran of Modern Korean Cinema wrote that it "transcends genre." Kyu Hyun Kim of Koreanfilm.org wrote that it is "a superbly intelligent and supremely witty piece of entertainment."

Kim Hye-soo received Best Actress nominations at the 48th Grand Bell Awards and the 32nd Blue Dragon Film Awards in 2011. She also won a Popular Star Award at the latter.

== Awards and nominations ==
Award	Category	Recipient	Result
48th Grand Bell Awards	Best Actress	Kim Hye-soo	Nominated
32nd Blue Dragon Film Awards	Best Actress	Kim Hye-soo	Nominated
32nd Blue Dragon Film Awards	Popular Star Award	Kim Hye-soo	Won
