= Miracle of a Giving Fool =

2008 South Korean film by Kim Jung-kwon

BA:BO
- Film poster
- Hangul: 바보
- RR: Babo
- MR: Pabo
- Directed by: Kim Jung-kwon
- Screenplay by: Kim Young-tak; Kim Jung-kwon
- Based on: BA:BO by Kang Full
- Produced by: Yang Ji-woong; Yoo Jay-hyuk
- Starring: Cha Tae-hyun; Ha Ji-won
- Cinematography: Kim Tae-kyeong
- Edited by: Shin Min-kyung
- Production company: Wire to Wire Film
- Distributed by: CJ Entertainment
- Release date: February 28, 2008
- Running time: 98 minutes
- Country: South Korea
- Language: Korean
- Box office: $6,453,485

Miracle of a Giving Fool, also known as BA:BO (Korean: 바보; lit. 'fool, idiot') is a 2008 South Korean film. Based on a webtoon, the film was directed by Kim Jung-kwon, and stars Cha Tae-hyun and Ha Ji-won in the lead roles.

== Plot ==
Ji-ho (Ha Ji-won) is a promising pianist who has been studying and playing abroad for years, but her career takes a blow when she is struck with stage fright. Upon returning home, Ji-ho is reunited with her old school friend, Seung-ryong (Cha Tae-hyun), who saw her returning home and they eventually met while Seung-ryong was busy trying to gaze at the stars in the middle of the day. Ji-ho then learnt how Seung-ryong became mentally disabled through her aunt and she takes the initiative to rekindle their friendship.

Seung-ryong often sells toast near the high school of his younger sister where he can be near to his sister who he guards with his life as that was the gift from his mother. Ji-in (Park Ha-sun) hates the fact that her brother is selling toast near the school and frequently chastise him for being mentally disabled.

In a flashback of a memory of Ji-ho, she mistakenly thought that Seung-ryong burnt the piano that was donated to the middle school which eventually led to Ji-ho to be mad at Seung-ryong but the fire was actually started by Sang-soon who was smoking near the piano while the rest were having physical activity in the field. All the kids blamed Seung-ryong for causing the fire but Seung-ryong mother believed that he was innocent.

Ji-ho walks around the area where she lived as a child and frequents a café that was run by Sang-soo (Park Hee-soon) who also went to the same middle school as Ji-ho and Seung-ryong. In the café, one of the workers is fond of Sang-soo, but she is held hostage by a gangster whom she owes money to and resorts to sell her body to repay the debt which causes Sang-soo to be angry which led to him drinking accompanied by Seung-ryong.

Sang-soon eventually wakes up at Seung-ryong's house and tells Ji-in (Park Ha-sun) to eat the breakfast that her older brother prepared for her, but she is adamant that she hates toast. One night, whilst Ji-ho was walking in the snowy road, she overheard Seung-ryong sing Twinkle Twinkle Little Star and realized that Seung-ryong were the one who helped her perform the song in front of the church she was attending, which she later told Seung-ryong.

One day, Seung-ryong noticed that Ji-in (Park Ha-sun) was tardy while going to school and learning that she was sick through the conversation from her class-mates. Seung-ryong barged into her school and clarified to her teacher that she is his sister. Ji-ho then gifted Seung-ryong a new pair of shoes which he eventually cherishes.

Ji-in eventually was told by her attending doctor of the sacrifice that Seung-ryong has made since he was a child selling toast. They become closer and her illness is eventually cured.

Sang-soo (Park Hee-soon) later falls into trouble with some gangsters after trying to save his loved one from trouble. The mob boss sends someone to kill Sang-soon, but the two hit-men didn't know what Sang-soo looks like and they attack Seung-ryong, who eventually succumbs to his injuries.

Upon learning of the passing of her older brother, she eventually saw what made Seung-ryong be so positive and have such a strong will to live. Sang-soo takes over the toast shop from Seung-ryong, whilst Ji-ho who was able to recover from her stage fright, plays in a grand hall with ease and pays homage to what Seung-ryong had done for her to recover from stage fright.

== Background ==
BA:BO was adapted from a popular webtoon of the same name created by Kang Full, which ran from January to April 2004. Director Kim Jung-kwon, himself a fan of the comic, was approached directly by Kang, and described the film as being faithful to the source material.

== Cast ==
- Cha Tae-hyun as Seung-ryong. A fan of the original comic, Tae-hyun stated at a press conference that he "cried [his] eyes out" when reading it. Rather than draw his inspiration from mentally challenged people in reality or as portrayed in other media, he felt it necessary to play the character as written in the comic. Cha gained eight kilograms during production, and was unable to lose all of that weight for his wedding in 2006.
  - Seo Dae-han as young Seung-ryong.
- Ha Ji-won as Ji-ho. Playing the role of a frustrated pianist, Ji-won performed on the piano herself for the film. Although she had studied piano as a child, she received tutoring from singer/songwriter No Young-shim, who also taught her subtle gestures and postures.
  - Sulli as young Ji-ho.
- Park Hee-soon as Sang-soo.
- Park Ha-sun as Ji-in.
- Greena Park as Hee-yeong.
- Jeon Mi-seon as young Seung-ryong's mother.
- Lee Ki-young as "Small Star" president.
- Lee Sang-hoon as junk seller.

== Box office ==
BA:BO was released on February 28, 2008, and was ranked third at the box office on its opening weekend, grossing $2,302,058. By April 6 the film had grossed a total of $6,450,178, and as of March 23 the total number of tickets sold was 951,573.
