= 32nd Blue Dragon Film Awards =

2011 edition of award ceremony

- Date: November 25, 2011
- Site: Kyung Hee University Peace Hall in Seoul
- Hosted by: Kim Hye-soo; Lee Beom-soo

Television coverage
- Network: SBS

The 32nd Blue Dragon Film Awards ceremony took place on November 25, 2011, at the Kyung Hee University Peace Hall in Seoul. Presented by Sports Chosun, it was broadcast on SBS and was hosted by actors Lee Beom-soo and Kim Hye-soo.

== Nominations and winners ==
Complete list of nominees and winners:

(Winners denoted in bold)

Best Film	Best Director
**The Unjust**; Silenced; The Front Line; Sunny; War of the Arrows	**Ryoo Seung-wan - The Unjust**; Hwang Dong-hyuk - Silenced; Jang Hoon - The Front Line; Kang Hyeong-cheol - Sunny; Kim Han-min - War of the Arrows
Best Actor	Best Actress
**Park Hae-il - War of the Arrows as Choi Nam-yi**; Go Soo - The Front Line as Kim Soo-hyeok; Gong Yoo - Silenced as Kang In-ho; Kim Yoon-seok - The Yellow Sea as Myun Jung-hak; Yoon Kye-sang - Poongsan as Poongsan	**Kim Ha-neul** - **Blind as Min Soo-ah**; Choi Kang-hee - Petty Romance as Han Da-rim; Jung Yu-mi - Silenced as Seo Yoo-jin; Kim Hye-soo - Villain and Widow as Hyun-joo; Tang Wei - Late Autumn as Anna
Best Supporting Actor	Best Supporting Actress
**Ryu Seung-ryong** - **War of the Arrows as Jyuushinta**; Jang Gwang - Silenced as Headmaster twin brothers; Jo Sung-ha - The Yellow Sea as Tae-won; Ko Chang-seok - The Front Line as Yang Hyo-sam; Yoo Hae-jin - The Unjust as Jang Seok-gu	**Kim Soo-mi** - **Late Blossom as Jo Soon-yi**; Chun Woo-hee - Sunny as Sang-mi; Jang Young-nam - Hello Ghost as Crying Ghost; Ryu Hyun-kyung - Petty Romance as Ma Kyun-sung; Yoo Sun - Glove as Na Joo-won
Best New Actor	Best New Actress
**Lee Je-hoon** - **Bleak Night as Ki-tae**; Lee David - The Front Line as Nam Seong-shik; Park Jung-bum - The Journals of Musan as Jang Seung-chul; Seo Jun-young - Bleak Night as Dong-yoon; Song Yoo-ha - Petty Romance as Han Jong-soo	**Moon Chae-won** - **War of the Arrows as Choi Ja-in**; Baek Jin-hee - Foxy Festival as Ja-hye; Kang So-ra - Sunny as teenage Ha Chun-hwa; Shin Se-kyung - Hindsight as Jo Se-bin; Yoo Da-in - Re-encounter as Hye-hwa
Best New Director	Best Screenplay
**Yoon Sung-hyun** - **Bleak Night**; Kim Jung-hoon - Petty Romance; Kim Min-seok - Haunters; Kim Young-tak - Hello Ghost; Park Jung-bum - The Journals of Musan	**Park Hoon-jung** - **The Unjust**; Choi Min-seok - Blind; Hwang Dong-hyuk - Silenced; Kang Hyeong-cheol - Sunny; Park Sang-yeon - The Front Line
Best Cinematography	Best Art Direction
**Kim Woo-hyung - The Front Line**; Chung Chung-hoon - The Unjust; Kim Tae-seong - War of the Arrows; Lee Sung-jae - The Yellow Sea; Son Won-ho - Blind	**Ryu Seong-hee** - **The Front Line**; Detective K: Secret of the Virtuous Widow; Lee Yo-han - Sunny; Jang Chun-seop - War of the Arrows; Lee Hoo-gyoung - The Yellow Sea
Best Lighting	Best Music
**Hwang Soon-wook** - **The Yellow Sea**; Shin Sang-yeol - Blind; Kim Jae-min - The Front Line; Bae Il-hyeok - The Unjust; Kim Gyeong-seok - War of the Arrows	**Mowg** - **Silenced**; Jang Young-gyu, Dalpalan - The Front Line; Jo Seong-woo, Choi Yong-rak - Late Autumn; Kim Jun-seok - Sunny; Kim Tae-seong - War of the Arrows
Technical Award	Best Short Film
**Oh Se-young** - **War of the Arrows (Fight Choreography)**; Kwon Yu-jin - Detective K: Secret of the Virtuous Widow (Costume Design); Jeong Seong-jin - The Front Line (Special Effects); Yun Dae-won - Sector 7 (CG); Nam Na-yeong - Sunny (Editing)	**Broken Night**
Popular Star Award	Audience Choice Award for Most Popular Film
**Go Soo** - **The Front Line**; **Gong Yoo** - **Silenced**; **Choi Kang-hee** - **Petty Romance**; **Kim Hye-soo** - **Villain and Widow**	**War of the Arrows**
