= 48th Grand Bell Awards =

2011 edition of award ceremony

- Official poster
- Date: October 17, 2011
- Site: Sejong Center in Seoul
- Hosted by: Shin Hyun-joon; Jang Seo-hee

Television coverage
- Network: KBS2

The 48th Grand Bell Awards (Korean: 대종상 영화제; RR: Daejongsang Yeonghwajae), also known as Daejong Film Awards, are determined and presented annually by The Motion Pictures Association of Korea for excellence in film in South Korea. The Grand Bell Awards were first presented in 1962 and have gained prestige as the Korean equivalent of the American Academy Awards.

== 48th ceremony ==
The 48th Grand Bell Awards ceremony was held at the Sejong Center for the Performing Arts in Seoul on October 17, 2011, and hosted by Shin Hyun-joon and Jang Seo-hee.

== Nominations and winners ==
(Winners denoted in bold)

Best Film	Best Director
**The Front Line**; Sunny; The Unjust; War of the Arrows; The Yellow Sea	**Kang Hyeong-cheol** - **Sunny**; Jang Hoon - The Front Line; Kim Tae-yong - Late Autumn; Na Hong-jin - The Yellow Sea; Ryoo Seung-wan - The Unjust
Best Actor	Best Actress
**Park Hae-il** - **War of the Arrows**; Cha Tae-hyun - Hello Ghost; Kim Yoon-seok - The Yellow Sea; Lee Soon-jae - Late Blossom; Yoon Kye-sang - Poongsan	**Kim Ha-neul** - **Blind**; Bae Jong-ok - The Last Blossom; Choi Kang-hee - Petty Romance; Kim Hye-soo - Villain and Widow; Yoon So-jung - Late Blossom
Best Supporting Actor	Best Supporting Actress
**Jo Sung-ha** - **The Yellow Sea**; Jo Hee-bong - Blind; Kim Sang-ho - Moby Dick; Ko Chang-seok - The Showdown; Yoo Hae-jin - The Unjust	**Shim Eun-kyung** - **Romantic Heaven**; Chun Woo-hee - Sunny; Jang Young-nam - Hello Ghost; Kim Ji-young - The Last Blossom; Kim Soo-mi - Late Blossom
Best New Actor	Best New Actress
**Lee Je-hoon** - **Bleak Night**; Jang Ki-bum - Glove; Kim Hwan-young - Ryang-kang-do: Merry Christmas, North!; Lee Je-hoon - The Front Line; Yoo Yeon-seok - Re-encounter	**Moon Chae-won** - **War of the Arrows**; Baek Jin-hee - Foxy Festival; Kang So-ra - Sunny; Shin Se-kyung - Hindsight; Yoo Da-in - Re-encounter
Best New Director	Best Screenplay
**Yoon Sung-hyun** - **Bleak Night**; Kim Sung-hoon - Ryang-kang-do: Merry Christmas, North!; Kim Young-tak - Hello Ghost; Min Yong-keun - Re-encounter; Park In-jae - Moby Dick	**Choi Min-seok** - **Blind**; Kang Hyeong-cheol - Sunny; Kim Young-tak - Hello Ghost; Park Hoon-jung - The Unjust; Park Sang-yeon - The Front Line
Best Cinematography	Best Editing
**Kim Woo-hyung** - **The Front Line**; Kim Byeong-seo - Hindsight; Kim Tae-seong, Park Jong-chul - War of the Arrows; Kim Woo-hyung - Late Autumn; Lee Sung-jae - The Yellow Sea	**Nam Na-yeong** - **Sunny**; Kim Sang-bum, Kim Jae-bum - The Front Line; Kim Sang-bum, Kim Jae-bum - The Unjust; Kim Sun-min - The Yellow Sea; Shin Min-kyung - Blind
Best Art Direction	Best Lighting
**Chae Kyung-sun** - **Detective K: Secret of the Virtuous Widow**; Jang Chun-seop - War of the Arrows; Lee Ha-jun - Hindsight; Lee Hoo-gyoun - The Yellow Sea; Trae King, Ryu Seong-hui - Late Autumn	**Kim Min-jae** - **The Front Line**; Hwang Soon-wook - The Yellow Sea; Lee Byeong-seong - Poongsan; Shin Kyung-man - Hindsight; Shin Sang-yeol - Blind
Best Costume Design	Best Music
**Chae Kyung-hwa** - **The Yellow Sea**; Chae Kyung-hwa - Sunny; Jo Sang-gyeong - The Front Line; Kwon Yu-jin - Detective K: Secret of the Virtuous Widow; Kwon Yu-jin - War of the Arrows	**Jo Seong-woo, Choi Yong-rak** - **Late Autumn**; 3rd Coast - Hindsight; Kang Min-guk - Late Blossom; Kim Jun-seok - Sunny; Lee Byung-woo - Romantic Heaven
Best Visual Effects	Best Sound Effects
**Han Young-woo** - **War of the Arrows**; Jeong Seong-jin - The Front Line; Kim Tae-hun, Jeong Jae-hun - The Yellow Sea; Park Jang-jin - Blind; Park Ui-dong - Romantic Heaven	**Choi Tae-young** - **War of the Arrows**; Choi Tae-young - The Yellow Sea; Jung Hee-gu, Kim Ji-eun - Blind; Kim Suk-won, Kim Chang-seop - The Front Line; Lee Seung-chul, Lee Seong-jin - Detective K: Secret of the Virtuous Widow
Best Planning	Popularity Award
**Lee Woo-jeong** - **The Front Line**; Ahn Byeong-ki, Lee Anna - Sunny; Kim Hyeong-cheol - Poongsan; Koo Bon-han - The Unjust; Yu Jeong-hun - Moby Dick	**Won Bin**
Lifetime Achievement Award
**Lee Dae-geun** (Actor)
