= Hit the Top =

2017 South Korean television series

- Promotional poster
- Also known as: The Best Hit
- Genre: Slice-of-life; Comedy; Drama; Youth; Romance
- Created by: Seo Soo-min
- Written by: Lee Young-chul; Lee Mi-rim
- Directed by: Yoo Ho-jin; Cha Tae-hyun (credited as "Ra Jun-mo") (Note: Ra Jun-mo was a character played by Cha Tae-hyun in The Producers.); Kim Sang-hoon
- Creative directors: Lee Sang-hyun; Choi Ji-young
- Starring: Yoon Shi-yoon; Lee Se-young; Kim Min-jae; Cha Tae-hyun
- Composer: Son Dong-woon
- Country of origin: South Korea
- Original language: Korean
- No. of episodes: 32

Production
- Executive producer: Kwon Kyung-il
- Producers: Park Seong-hye; Oh Min-soo; Kim Sang-heon
- Cinematography: Kang Yoon-sun; Kim Ki-ho
- Editor: Kim Soo-hyun
- Camera setup: Single-camera
- Running time: 35-45 mins
- Production companies: Chorokbaem Media; KBS Monster Union

Original release
- Network: KBS2
- Release: June 2 – July 22, 2017

Hit the Top (Korean: 최고의 한방; RR: Choegoui hanbang; lit. 'Best Punch') is a South Korean television series starring Yoon Shi-yoon, Lee Se-young, Kim Min-jae and Cha Tae-hyun. The drama aired on KBS2, from June 2 to July 22, 2017, on Fridays and Saturdays at 23:00 (KST) for 32 episodes.

Hit the Top is the first drama directed by Yoo Ho-jin, who directed the third season of variety show 2 Days & 1 Night; and the directorial debut of Cha Tae-hyun, who also co-starred.

== Synopsis ==
In the year 1993, pop idol Yoo Hyun-Jae accidentally travels through time to 2017. Discovering that he mysteriously disappears in 1994 and is presumed dead, he begins to investigate into the reason for his disappearance while trying to adjust to life in the future. Meanwhile, Lee Ji-Hoon is an aspiring musician and is secretly enrolled as an idol trainee at Star Punch Entertainment. Ji-hoon struggles to hide this from his parents, who believe he has been studying for his civil service exams.

== Cast ==
=== Main ===
- Yoon Shi-yoon as Yoo Hyun-jae

A popular Korean pop idol from the 1990s and the lead partner of performing duo J2 (제이투; Jeitu). Known for his good looks, talent, and controversies, he accidentally time travels to 2017 and helplessly tries to adjust to the modern way of living. Lee Ji Hoon's biological father.

- Lee Se-young as Choi Woo-seung

A cheerful, perky student who is also preparing with Lee Ji-hoon for the civil exam. After finding out about her boyfriend's infidelity with her roommate, she reluctantly moves in to Ji-hoon's apartment.

- Kim Min-jae as Lee Ji-hoon

He is Lee Gwang-jae's foster child. Despite preparing to take a civil service exam, he is secretly struggling to become an idol at Star Punch Entertainment. It is later revealed that he is the son of Yoo Hyun-jae and Hong Bo-hee.

- Cha Tae-hyun as Lee Gwang-jae

Lee Ji-hoon's adoptive father and World Planning Entertainment's CEO. Currently running a desolate management firm, he used to be Yoo Hyun-jae's hotshot manager. For years, he has harbored a one-sided love for Hong Bo-hee.

=== Supporting ===
==== World Entertainment ====
- Yoon Son-ha as Hong Bo-hee

Lee Ji-hoon's mother. Once a very famous K-pop singer in the 90s, her controversial relationship with Hyun-jae has led to her career's demise and now manages a bakery adjacent to the firm. She continuously tries to make a comeback to the entertainment industry.

- Dong Hyun-bae as MC Drill

An aspiring rapper who secretly lives with best friend Ji-hoon at the latter's loft. A fellow idol trainee at Star Punch, he also harbors a secretive past, such as his military enlistment.

- Lee Deok-hwa as Lee Soon-tae

President of Entertainment Management Association and the chairman of World Entertainment who ceaselessly tries to fund it despite its dismal state.

==== Star Punch Entertainment ====
- Hong Kyung-min as Park Young-jae

The other half of J2 who was constantly overshadowed by his duo partner Hyun-jae. He currently manages Star Punch Entertainment using the latter's lost musical works that he secretly keeps in his office.

- Im Ye-jin as Cathy

Chairwoman of Star Punch who is constantly critical of Young-jae.

- Cha Eun-woo as MJ

One of Star Punch's popular idols, and a frequent recipient of works from Hyun-jae's lost musical material, which he is forced to claim as his own.

- Bona as Do Hye-ri

An idol trainee who is on the brink of debuting. However, she is always pressured by her weight and appearance which keeps her from being presented to the music scene.

=== Others ===
- Lee Han-soo as Mal-sook
- Lee Jung-min as Heol-re
- Son Soo-min as Beol-ddeok
- Choi Seung-hoon as Shin Hwa
- Kim Seung-hyun
- Lim Sung-min
- Kim Ji-hyun
- Choi Ri-yoon
- Ha Nam-woo
- Lim Ji-seob
- Kim Tae-bin
- Hong Seok-yoon
- Lee Ha-na
- Yoon Sun-ah
- Choi Jung-eun
- Lim Yoo-mi
- Yoon Kab-soo
- Kim Young-hee
- Lee Sung-hoon
- Gong Min-gyu
- Kim Yong-jae
- Kim Ji-eun
- Han Hyong-gyu
- Lee Young-rae
- Choi Nam-uk
- Kim Do-yoon
- Nam Seung-woo
- Lee Ri-na
- Ryu Ba
- Uk Sa-na
- Park Mi-hyo
- Choi Seul-gi
- Ko Jin-myung
- Seo Hee
- Kim Ji-yeon
- Jo Moon-young
- Kim Hyong-gyu
- Kwon Hyuk
- Seo Hye-jin
- Choi Jung-eun
- Ahn Nyu-mi
- Lee Soo-min
- Choi Yoo-sol
- Min Do-hee

=== Special appearances ===
- Kim Byung-chan
- Son Bum-soo as Gayo Top 10 MC (Ep. 1)
- Ko Chang-seok as Photographer (Ep. 1)
- Shin Seung-hwan as Noryangjin Academy Instructor (Ep. 1)
- Kim Sook as Kim Sook, a student and one of MJ's fans (Ep. 1–3, 8, 17–18)
- Shorry J as Soo-jin, an ex-Star Punch Entertainment trainee (Ep. 1)
- Park Hyuk-kwon as Director Park (Ep. 1, 7)
- Choi Hwa-jung as herself, radio DJ (Ep. 1–2)
- Kim Jun-ho as a karaoke customer (Ep. 1) / doctor (Ep. 3)
- Kim Dae-hee as a karaoke customer (Ep. 1) / car crash victim (Ep. 2)
- Jung Da-eun as reporter
- Lee Kwang-soo as Yoon-gi, Choi Woo-seung's ex-boyfriend (Ep. 1–2)
- Semmi as Choi Woo-seung's roommate (Ep. 1–2, 25)
- Ahn Gil-kang as a criminal suspect (Ep. 2)
- Choi Kwon as policeman interrogating Choi Woo-seung (Ep. 2)
- Defconn as himself (Ep. 3)
- Jang Hyuk (Ep. 3)
- WJSN as Star Punch trainees (Ep. 4)
- Monsta X as themselves (Ep. 4)
- Kwon Ki-jong as a food delivery man/referee (Ep. 5) (Note: Kwon Ki-jong's appearance was a reference to his role as the "International Referee" in 2 Days & 1 Night.)
- Lee Yoo-jong
- Kim Dong-hyeon as music producer at Star Punch Entertainment (Ep. 7)
- Kim Il-joong as Challenge Music Star (TV show) host (Ep. 7–8)
- Kim Jong-min (Ep. 8)
- Jang Jae-young as MC at talent show (Ep. 10)
- Lee Soon-jae as man at the convenience store
- Yoon Ji-on as Detective
- Kan Mi-youn as Ha Soo-young (Ep. 16)
- Lee Soo-ji as a phishing scammer (Ep. 21) (Note: Lee Soo-ji's appearance was a reference to one of Gag Concert's skits, The Yellow Sea.)
- Lee Ju-shil as Chairwoman Oh of Jongno Entertainment (Ep. 25, 28)

== Episodes ==
No.	Title	Original release date
1	"Episode 1"	2 June 2017
Twenty-three years after the disappearance of popular Korean pop idol Yoo Hyun-jae (Yoon Shi-yoon), his then-management agency World Entertainment and its tenants struggle to survive in an industry dominated by K-pop idol groups. Its CEO and Hyun-jae's then-manager Lee Gwang-jae (Cha Tae-hyun) strives to pay the firm's debts while managing struggling artists—including 90s singer Hong Bo-hee (Yoon Son-ha), who now manages a bakery. Her son Lee Ji-hoon (Kim Min-jae), though preparing for a civil service exam with his friend Choi Woo-seung (Lee Se-young), is secretly training to become a pop idol at a competing agency. In an attempt to make a comeback, Bo-hee requests for Gwang-jae to secure her a guest slot on a TV show, only for him to secure a spot for her on a radio program.
2	"Episode 2"	2 June 2017
Woo-seung discovers her boyfriend is cheating on her with her roommate just after she professes her love while wearing the latter's police uniform. In a club, after learning Hyun-jae's dance moves on the internet, Ji-hoon accidentally gropes two women while performing it. Both of them ended up being questioned at the police station separately. Ji-hoon's offers Woo-seung to secretly stay with him in his apartment, which she reluctantly accepts. On the way home, they accidentally almost hit their car on an unconscious Hyun-jae, who had just arrived from the past. Meanwhile, Bo-hee's appearance on the radio show takes an embarrassing turn.
3	"Episode 3"	3 June 2017
Hyun-jae accidentally time travels to the present and finds the world is not what it once was. Bo-hee's stint on the radio goes viral on the internet, causing her to be an object of infamy. Ji-Hoon, Woo-seung, and MC Drill (Dong Hyun-bae) drive to the hospital to visit Hyun-jae with the car the latter used to own, only to find out they had just missed each other. Hyun-jae spots his car on the entrance drop-off and leaves the hospital with it, along with Woo-seung, who was sleeping inside at the time.
4	"Episode 4"	3 June 2017
Woo-seung wakes up to find out that Hyun-jae is driving the car and tries to tackle him, causing the car to break down. After having it fixed, he overhears a certain "Lee Gwang-jae" and drives around to follow him, abandoning Woo-seung in the process. Swearing revenge on him, she calls for Ji-hoon and an infuriated MC Drill for help. After losing "Lee Gwang-jae" on the road, Hyun-jae drives to World Entertainment, only to be surprised to discover it in a desolate state. Upon seeing it, he realized that his past actions and disappearance has led the agency to near bankruptcy.
5	"Episode 5"	9 June 2017
Hyun-jae goes to his old apartment, now occupied by Ji-hoon, Woo-seung, and MC Drill, and gets interrogated by the three at a police station, claiming to have amnesia after being hit by their car. Worried of being found guilty and that he might ask for a settlement for it, the three decide to offer him to stay with them in secret until he regains his memory. Upon staying, his newfound love of smartphones has led him to accidentally leave a selfie on Bo-hee's phone, which she left unattended at the time. Meanwhile, Bo-hee stumbles upon a pitch for her to appear on a variety program and decides to prepare for it.
6	"Episode 6"	9 June 2017
Hyun-jae decides to leave the apartment out of hunger and boredom, and gets caught by a petrified Lee Soon-tae (Lee Deok-hwa), who thinks he is a poltergeist. He later accepts an offer by Woo-seung to clean-up for her at her work in exchange for a phone. The following day, it is the civil exam day which happens to occur at the same time as the evaluation day at the agency, forcing Ji-hoon to choose between taking the exam with Woo-seung and performing with MC Drill for the evaluation.
7	"Episode 7"	10 June 2017
Everyone at the World Entertainment building is starting to feel suspicious about a presence secretly living at Ji-hoon's loft. At Star Punch Entertainment, Park Young-jae (Hong Kyung-min) reveals a hidden relic from his former partner's past. Hyun-jae offers Woo-seung a part-time job to accompany him to a lead from his last whereabouts in 1994 using the money he had previously stashed in the apartment. Meanwhile, Bo-hee's viral popularity has caught the attention of a screen writer who wants to cast her for a TV show.
8	"Episode 8"	10 June 2017
Hyun-jae overhears a song he once had written in the past but is surprised to hear someone else is singing it. He later meets and confronts him while accompanying Woo-seung at her workplace. At the TV show, Bo-hee exhibits a hidden talent and reveals so much more. After filming, she drinks the night away with Gwang-jae and falls asleep on the road home, only to be found by a bypassing Hyun-jae.
9	"Episode 9"	16 June 2017
Astounded to find Hyun-jae after 20 years, Gwang-jae attempts to send him back to his timeline while hiding him from the other members of the family. Meanwhile, Woo-seung mistakes MJ (Cha Eun-woo) for Ji-hoon and accidentally leaves her notebook with him. After discovering the bank that used to keep his accounts had gone bankrupt, Hyun-jae begins searching for the mysterious number that keeps on beeping on his now-defunct pager.
10	"Episode 10"	16 June 2017
Distraught after being laid off from her part-time job, Woo-seung invites Hyun-jae, MC Drill, and Ji-hoon for drinks at the loft. The day after, Hyun-jae and Ji-hoon, accompanied by Woo-seung, decide to participate in a talent contest at the mall. MJ later returns the notebook to Woo-seung.
11	"Episode 11"	17 June 2017
Gwang-jae finds Hyun-jae with Ji-hoon at the talent show and reveals to him a long-harbored secret. Meanwhile, Soon-tae asks Bo-hee to make preparations for Gwang-jae's birthday, which also happens to be the day Hyun-jae had disappeared. In an effort to repay his debts to Woo-seung, Hyun-jae decides to cover for her part-time job as a mascot.
12	"Episode 12"	17 June 2017
Ji-hoon spends the day sneaking out between the Star Punch building and the school in an effort to hide his idol training from Gwang-jae. Meanwhile, Hyun-jae gets himself trapped inside the family's apartment after switching Ji-hoon's present for Gwang-jae. Later that day, the whole family holds a memorial service for Hyun-jae in order to part with him and to focus on celebrating Gwang-jae's birthday.
13	"Episode 13"	23 June 2017
Gwang-jae's birthday is ruined by everyone's discovery of Hyun-jae, just as they are beginning to part with him, as well as Gwang-jae's accidental finding of Ji-hoon's secrets. Despite claiming to be a lookalike of himself, Hyun-jae is being suspected as his real self by Soon-tae and Bo-hee. Ji-hoon's friends later persuade him to convince Gwang-jae to allow him to pursue his training, but decides to tell everyone about it, as well as his secret harboring of his friends at his apartment.
14	"Episode 14"	23 June 2017
Gwang-jae rejects an offer for Bo-hee to star as a gimbap mascot in an advertisement, thinking it as an undignified promotional activity for her. Worried about the financial state of World Entertainment, he later reluctantly asks Young-jae for a loan at Star Punch, where Woo-seung is also applying for an internship. While researching on the internet, Hyun-jae becomes a member of an online forum discussing conspiracy theories about his disappearance, including the ones that are linked to Young-jae and Gwang-jae.
15	"Episode 15"	24 June 2017
Woo-seung invites Hyun-jae and Ji-hoon to dinner. Ji-hoon refuses, but was later discovered by the two at the same restaurant he and his colleague Do Hye-ri (Bona) are eating at. The following day, Hyun-jae tries to find the cash he had previously stashed at the loft, but was blocked by an electronic lock Ji-hoon had set up on Woo-seung's room. He later applies for a part-time job working for Bo-hee at the bakery. Meanwhile, Woo-seung begins her first day working at Star Punch.
16	"Episode 16"	24 June 2017
Hyun-jae forces himself to Woo-seung and Ji-hoon's weekend getaway to explore the city. Gwang-jae later gives him an additional part-time job as a manager for World Entertainment. Despite Gwang-jae reluctance, Bo-hee accepts the gimbap commercial job despite having a fever that day. After an encouraging dinner with Gwang-jae, Ji-hoon musters up the courage to do what he had really wanted in his life. Meanwhile, Hyun-jae was able to unlock the door on Woo-seung's room to find his hidden stash, but decides to wait for her instead.
17	"Episode 17"	30 June 2017
After overhearing Woo-seung reject Ji-hoon's love, a conflicted Hyun-jae contemplates on whether to process his feelings for her or help his son win her over. The next day, a group of stans upload a candid photo of Ji-hoon on social media and causes it to go viral; while Hyun-jae discovers a surprise after opening his hidden stash in Woo-seung's room. At Star Punch, Woo-seung's presentation in front of MJ and Young-jae goes awkward after an intervention from Hyun-jae and Ji-hoon.
18	"Episode 18"	30 June 2017
Worried about Gwang-jae's financial troubles, Bo-hee goes to Star Punch and asks Young-jae for a loan, but receives an offer to transfer her management to him instead. Ji-hoon becomes a viral sensation on the internet, and becomes a target of obsessive fan calls. Star Punch also takes notice of Ji-hoon's sudden popularity, and offers him a position in the debut idol group. A pressured Woo-seung is obliged to participate in the intern hiking trip, which ends with her being stranded in the forest. Feeling awkward about asking Ji-hoon for help, she calls for Hyun-jae's aid instead. Thinking it would help his son win her over, Hyun-jae passes the task to him. Ji-hoon must decide on whether to accept the Star Punch's offer or to help Woo-seung.
19	"Episode 19"	1 July 2017
After learning that Ji-hoon had left to accept the offer instead of helping Woo-seung, Hyun-jae rushes to the hiking trail to look for her. With Bo-hee transferring to Star Punch, Gwang-jae begins to look for a job elsewhere, but was passed off in favor of more qualified applicants. Drinking his problems away throughout the night, he is stumbled upon by a guilt-ridden Hyun-jae, who had just learned of his personal sacrifices to the agency and to him. Meanwhile, Soon-tae discovers his granddaughter Mal-sook (Lee Han-soo) is having a relationship at a young age, and is having a difficulty adjusting to the situation.
20	"Episode 20"	1 July 2017
Hye-ri asks MC Drill to let her visit Ji-hoon after learning about his fate at the training agency. Worried about Mal-sook being cheated upon, Soon-tae confronts his granddaughter's boyfriend. Woo-seung and Ji-hoon confront each other about the awkward state regarding their relationship. Worried for the World Entertainment's debts, Ji-hoon, and Gwang-jae, Hyun-jae decides to reveal himself to Young-jae and lays a claim for a share of Star Punch Entertainment.
21	"Episode 21"	7 July 2017
Claiming his share of Young-jae's profits and blackmailing him about the ghostwritten songs, Hyun-jae is hired as an executive producer at Star Punch, surprising Woo-seung. The two spend their time at their newfound job together. After having a makeover, Ji-hoon's candid photos on social media goes viral, and he is referred by Hye-ri to a different agency.
22	"Episode 22"	7 July 2017
While Gwang-jae and Ji-hoon spend the whole day fishing, Hyun-jae and Woo-seung are left alone at the loft. That evening, Woo-seung gets locked out of her room, while Hyun-jae catches a fever after getting himself caught in the rain.
23	"Episode 23"	8 July 2017
Woo-seung nurses Hyun-jae back to health, bothering Ji-hoon, who is beginning to notice something suspicious about Hyun-jae's past. At Star Punch, Woo-seung accidentally deletes an entire master recording, forcing Hyun-jae to take over and recreate the track from scratch. That evening, Ji-hoon asks Hyun-jae to keep a distance from Woo-seung.
24	"Episode 24"	8 July 2017
Compelled to give in to Ji-hoon's wishes, Hyun-jae tries to avoid Woo-seung as much as possible. He later secretly switches his 1993 composition notebook with the one hidden in Young-jae's vault and discovers a clue in unlocking a mystery of his past.
25	"Episode 25"	14 July 2017
Gwang-jae reveals to Ji-hoon the truth about Hyun-jae. At Star Punch, MJ discovers that his album(s) had been written by Hyun-jae and asks for his help in writing songs. Meanwhile, Woo-seung is unexpectedly visited by her former roommate and best friend, leaving Hyun-jae to step up and act as her boyfriend.
26	"Episode 26"	14 July 2017
Hyun-jae offers Woo-seung to sing a demo track and professes his feelings for her. Ji-hoon discovers that MC Drill was laid off at the agency and now works at a shipment warehouse. Feeling guilty about living off from Ji-hoon, Woo-seung decides to move out of the loft and into her own apartment.
27	"Episode 27"	15 July 2017
Woo-seung overhears Ji-hoon telling Hyun-jae the truth about him. Worried about the uncertainty of the future of their relationship, she tries to avoid him. At World Entertainment, Gwang-jae persuades Ji-hoon and MC Drill to form together as a musical duo. Later that day, Hyun-jae takes a reluctant Ji-hoon to an overnight camping trip.
28	"Episode 28"	15 July 2017
After cracking the code on his past, Hyun-jae discovers his long-lost money and uses it to terminate MJ's contract at Star Punch. He later persuades MJ to sign with Gwang-jae in order to secure an investor for World Entertainment. That evening, Hyun-jae later helps Bo-hee and Gwang-jae profess their love for one another. Feeling alienated in the present time, he contemplates on leaving it behind for the past.
29	"Episode 29"	21 July 2017
Woo-seung prevents Hyun-jae from leaving her behind by making him spend the night in her apartment. The following day, Hyun-jae confronts Young-jae to confess about his disappearance and later uncovers the truth about it from someone else. After finding a way to return to the past, he becomes conflicted as staying with Woo-seung in the present would prevent Ji-hoon from being born. Meanwhile, MJ wants to reveal the truth about his songs to the public before Young-jae does.
30	"Episode 30"	21 July 2017
Soo-tae's dementia impels him to forget his way home. Gwang-jae discovers what happened to the money Hyun-jae left behind for them. Ji-hoon and MC Drill pay a visit to Woo-seung's apartment. Hyun-jae decides to return to the past to allow Ji-hoon to exist in the present.
31	"Episode 31"	22 July 2017
Hyun-jae wakes up to find that he has traveled back to the past. But instead of returning to 1993, he finds out that he has journeyed to 1994. After seeking the help of a then-confused Gwang-jae to locate the Hyun-jae of 1994, the Hyun-jae of 1993 persuades the depressed Hyun-jae of 1994 to prevent himself from illness by telling him that the illness can be cured in modern times. There, he also tells the tales of his time-travel journey into 2017 and the Hyun-jae of 1994's son, Ji-hoon. But the Hyun-jae of 1994 denies wanting to go to the modern times, saying that their destiny is different even though they are the same. However, he helps the Hyun-jae of 1993 return to the future. Meanwhile in the future, Ji-hoon and MC Drill make their debut performance as JB.
32	"Episode 32"	22 July 2017
Woo-seung adjusts to a life without Hyun-jae. Despite losing MJ to World Entertainment, Young-jae retains an adversarial but cordial relationship with Gwang-jae, who marries Bo-hee. After a year, Hyun-jae successfully returns to the future and decides to stay there with Woo-seung and maintains a friendly relationship with Ji-hoon. As Woo-seung, Ji-hoon, and MC Drill celebrate Hyun-jae's return, Ji-hoon envisions a bright future ahead of them, remarking that their "Best Hit" is yet to come.

== Production ==
Hit the Top is the second "variety-drama" produced by KBS after The Producers in 2015. It is produced by director Seo Soo-min, who is currently the chief producer for KBS's Happy Sunday programming block and the former PD of the now-defunct program Gag Concert. Seo also worked on a few episodes of The Producers.

Chorokbaem Media, the company behind The Producers, was tapped to produce Hit the Top for KBS. Sitcom writer Lee Young-chul (Potato Star 2013QR3, High Kick! and Once Upon a Time in Saengchori) is penning the script. The first script reading took place on April 3, 2017, in Sangam-dong, Seoul, South Korea.

== Original soundtrack ==
Hit the Top Original Soundtrack

Soundtrack album by Various Artists
- Genre: Soundtrack
- Language: Korean, English
- Label: CJ E&M Music, Naym Naym Entertainment

=== Part 1 ===
No.	Title	Lyrics	Music	Artists	Length
1.	"Beautiful Beautiful"	Ji Hoon	Glabingo	Punch, Glabingo	03:25
2.	"Beautiful Beautiful" (Inst.)		Glabingo		03:25
Total length:					06:50

=== Part 2 ===
No.	Title	Lyrics	Music	Artists	Length
1.	"Dream" (꿈은)	Kim Min-jae; Ji Hoon	Lee Seung-joo	Kim Min-jae, Younha	03:56
2.	"Dream" (Inst.)		Lee Seung-joo		03:56
Total length:					07:52

=== Part 3 ===
No.	Title	Lyrics	Music	Artist	Length
1.	"Light in the Sky" (젊은 날의 Sky)	Ji Hoon	Rocoberry	Yoon Mi-rae	02:59
2.	"Light in the Sky" (Inst.)		Rocoberry		02:59
Total length:					05:58

=== Part 4 ===
No.	Title	Lyrics	Music	Artists	Length
1.	"Tonight" (오늘 밤)	Ji Hoon; beautiful noise	Rocoberry	BoA, Mad Clown	03:39
2.	"Tonight" (Inst.)		Rocoberry		03:39
Total length:					07:18

=== Part 5 ===
No.	Title	Lyrics	Music	Artist	Length
1.	"The Night Sky" (밤하늘)	Ji Hoon	Rocoberry	Park Kyung (Block B)	03:28
2.	"The Night Sky" (Inst.)		Rocoberry		03:28
Total length:					06:56

=== Part 6 ===
No.	Title	Lyrics	Music	Artist	Length
1.	"If You"	Ji Hoon	Lee Seung-joo	Kyuhyun (Super Junior)	04:03
2.	"If You" (Inst.)		Lee Seung-joo		04:03
Total length:					08:06

=== Part 7 ===
No.	Title	Lyrics	Music	Artist	Length
1.	"I Always"	Changmo	Changmo	Changmo	03:59
2.	"I Always" (Inst.)		Changmo		03:59
Total length:					07:58

=== Part 8 ===
No.	Title	Lyrics	Music	Artist	Length
1.	"My Love"	Ji Hoon	Ahn Young-min	T-ara	03:30
2.	"My Love" (Inst.)		Ahn Young-min		03:30
Total length:					07:00

== Ratings ==
- In the table below, the blue numbers represent the lowest ratings and the red numbers represent the highest ratings.
- NR denotes that the drama did not rank in the top 20 daily programs on that date.

Episode #	Original Broadcast Date	Average audience share			
Episode #	Original Broadcast Date	TNmS Ratings		AGB Nielsen	
Episode #	Original Broadcast Date	Nationwide	Seoul National Capital Area	Nationwide	Seoul National Capital Area
1	June 2, 2017	3.1% (NR)	3.9% (NR)	2.5% (NR)	3.3% (NR)
2	June 2, 2017	3.2% (NR)	4.1% (NR)	2.9%(NR)	3.8% (NR)
3	June 3, 2017	5.1% (NR)	5.7% (19th)	5.0% (NR)	5.6% (NR)
4	June 3, 2017	4.7% (NR)	5.6% (NR)	4.1% (NR)	5.0% (NR)
5	June 9, 2017	3.1% (NR)	3.3% (NR)	2.7% (NR)	2.9% (NR)
6	June 9, 2017	3.3% (NR)	3.4% (NR)	2.6% (NR)	2.7% (NR)
7	June 10, 2017	5.1% (NR)	5.0% (20th)	4.9% (NR)	5.4% (17th)
8	June 10, 2017	4.8% (NR)	5.2% (NR)	4.7% (NR)	5.1% (NR)
9	June 16, 2017	2.3% (NR)	2.8% (NR)	3.0% (NR)	3.5% (NR)
10	June 16, 2017	2.6% (NR)	3.2% (NR)	3.2% (NR)	3.8% (NR)
11	June 17, 2017	4.7% (NR)	5.3% (17th)	5.5% (20th)	5.6% (17th)
12	June 17, 2017	4.5% (NR)	5.0% (NR)	4.9% (NR)	5.4% (NR)
13	June 23, 2017	3.1% (NR)	3.7% (NR)	3.0% (NR)	3.6% (NR)
14	June 23, 2017	3.6% (NR)	4.1% (NR)	3.4% (NR)	3.9% (NR)
15	June 24, 2017	3.9% (NR)	4.2% (NR)	4.7% (NR)	5.0% (NR)
16	June 24, 2017	3.9% (NR)	4.5% (NR)	4.1% (NR)	4.7% (NR)
17	June 30, 2017	3.0% (NR)	3.5% (NR)	2.3% (NR)	2.8% (NR)
18	June 30, 2017	3.3% (NR)	4.0% (NR)	2.8% (NR)	3.5% (NR)
19	July 1, 2017	3.6% (NR)	4.3% (NR)	3.9% (NR)	4.6% (NR)
20	July 1, 2017	4.0% (NR)	4.8% (NR)	3.9% (NR)	4.7% (NR)
21	July 7, 2017	3.5% (NR)	3.7% (NR)	2.7% (NR)	2.9% (NR)
22	July 7, 2017	3.0% (NR)	3.1% (NR)	2.7% (NR)	2.8% (NR)
23	July 8, 2017	4.6% (NR)	5.1% (NR)	4.4% (NR)	4.9% (NR)
24	July 8, 2017	4.7% (NR)	5.2% (NR)	4.9% (NR)	5.4% (NR)
25	July 14, 2017	2.7% (NR)	3.3% (NR)	3.3% (NR)	3.9% (NR)
26	July 14, 2017	3.2% (NR)	3.7% (NR)	3.5% (NR)	4.0% (NR)
27	July 15, 2017	3.3% (NR)	4.0% (NR)	3.7% (NR)	4.4% (NR)
28	July 15, 2017	3.9% (NR)	4.5% (NR)	4.1% (NR)	4.7% (NR)
29	July 21, 2017	3.0% (NR)	3.4% (NR)	3.1% (NR)	3.5% (NR)
30	July 21, 2017	3.3% (NR)	3.5% (NR)	3.0% (NR)	3.2% (NR)
31	July 22, 2017	5.0% (NR)	5.6% (NR)	5.3% (NR)	5.9% (NR)
32	July 22, 2017	4.8% (NR)	5.4% (19%)	5.4% (NR)	6.0% (20th)
Average		3.9%	5.2%	2.9%	5.6%

== Awards and nominations ==
Year	Award	Category	Recipient	Result
2017	1st The Seoul Awards	Best New Actor	Kim Min-jae	Nominated
2017	31s KBS Drama Awards	Best New Actress	Bona	Nominated
