= Jang Hoon =

South Korean film director (born 1975)

- Born: May 4, 1975 (age 51); Jeongseon, Gangwon, South Korea
- Education: Seoul National University - B.Des. (Visual design)
- Occupations: Film director, writer, editor
- Years active: 2005–present

Korean name
- Hangul: 장훈
- Hanja: 張薰
- RR: Jang Hun
- MR: Chang Hun

Jang Hoon (Korean: 장훈; born May 4, 1975) is a South Korean film director. He directed the films Rough Cut (2008), Secret Reunion (2010), The Front Line (2011), and A Taxi Driver (2017).

== Career ==
=== 2005–2010: Rough Cut and Secret Reunion ===
Jang Hoon (along with Jang Cheol-soo and Juhn Jai-hong) worked as an assistant director under Kim Ki-duk. His debut film Rough Cut (2008), about a gangster who wants to become an actor and an actor who thinks he is as tough as a gangster, was written and produced by Kim. Rough Cut was much more commercially oriented than Kim's own movies, and the star power of its two leading actors So Ji-sub and Kang Ji-hwan propelled the indie to more than one million admissions, resulting in a profit 10 times its low budget.

Jang's second feature, Secret Reunion (2010), benefited from the director's populist sensibility. A story about two intelligence agents, one from South Korea and the other from the North (played by Song Kang-ho and Kang Dong-won, respectively), who approach each other in acts of espionage only to develop an unlikely friendship, the film sold 5.5 million tickets, making it the second highest grossing Korean film of that year.

=== 2011–present: Critical and commercial success ===
His third film, The Front Line, was a large-scale war movie that came out during the 2011 summer blockbuster season. Starring Go Soo and Shin Ha-kyun, the film was the most well-received among the ample number of Korean War-themed films and TV dramas commemorating the 60th anniversary of the war. Through the guise of a mystery narrative, the film revolved around the story of South and North Korean soldiers carrying out meaningless sacrifices trying to capture a nameless hill. It was selected as South Korea's submission to the 84th Academy Awards for Best Foreign Language Film, but did not make the final shortlist.

Jang became the subject of controversy when former mentor Kim Ki-duk's documentary-style self-portrait Arirang was released. In the Cannes award-winning film, the elder cineaste explicitly criticized him as "a betrayer" after Jang signed with the film production company Showbox/Mediaplex. Regarding the matter, Jang said, "I hope director Kim can find consolation through Arirang. He is a great teacher and I still respect him very much. I feel very sorry as a pupil of his." In 2012 Jang, Kang Hyeong-cheol and E J-yong made short films for Samsung Galaxy Note's ambitious PPL-film project Cine Note starring Ha Jung-woo. Actor Ko Chang-seok has appeared in all four of Jang's feature films in supporting roles.

In May 2025, Jang's upcoming film Canvas of Blood was one of the nine films granted by the Korean Film Council with financial support as part of their “Mid-Budget Korean Film Production Support” project. In August 2025, actors Kim Nam-gil and Park Bo-gum were confirmed to star in the film.

== Filmography ==
=== Film ===
| Year | Title | | Role | Note | Ref. |
| Year | English | Korean | Role | Note | Ref. |
|---|---|---|---|---|---|
| 2001 | Hera Purple | 헤라 퍼플 | assistant director | | |
| 2004 | Samaritan Girl | 사마리아 | assistant director | | |
| 2004 | Love, So Divine | 신부수업 | assistant director | | |
| 2004 | 3-Iron | 빈집 | assistant director | | |
| 2006 | Time | 시간 | assistant director, assistant editor | | |
| 2005 | The Bow | 활 | assistant director | | |
| 2008 | Rough Cut | 영화는 영화다 | director, script editor | | |
| 2010 | Secret Reunion | 의형제 | director, script editor | | |
| 2011 | The Front Line | 고지전 | director | | |
| 2012 | Cine Note 시네 노트 "Lost Number" | | co-director | short film | |
| 2017 | A Taxi Driver | 택시 운전사 | director | | |
| TBA | Canvas of Blood | 몽유도원도 | director | | |

== Accolades ==
=== Awards and nominations ===
| Award | Year | Category | Nominated work | Result | Ref. |
|---|---|---|---|---|---|
| Asian World Film Festival | 2017 | Best Film | A Taxi Driver | Won | |
| Asian World Film Festival | 2017 | Humanitarian Award | A Taxi Driver | Won | |
| Baeksang Arts Awards | 2018 | Grand Prize (Film) | A Taxi Driver | Nominated | |
| Baeksang Arts Awards | 2018 | Best Film | A Taxi Driver | Nominated | |
| Baeksang Arts Awards | 2018 | Best Director (Film) | A Taxi Driver | Nominated | |
| Blue Dragon Film Awards | 2011 | Best Film | The Front Line | Nominated | |
| Blue Dragon Film Awards | 2017 | Best Film | A Taxi Driver | Won | |
| Blue Dragon Film Awards | 2017 | Audience Choice Award for Most Popular Film | A Taxi Driver | Won | |
| Blue Dragon Film Awards | 2017 | Best Director | A Taxi Driver | Nominated | |
| Buil Film Awards | 2011 | Best Film | The Front Line | Won | |
| Buil Film Awards | 2017 | Best Film | A Taxi Driver | Won | |
| Buil Film Awards | 2017 | Audience Award | A Taxi Driver | Won | |
| Buil Film Awards | 2017 | Buil Readers' Jury Award | A Taxi Driver | Won | |
| Chunsa Film Art Awards | 2017 | Best Director | A Taxi Driver | Nominated | |
| Director's Cut Awards | 2017 | Special Mentions | A Taxi Driver | Won | |
| Grand Bell Awards | 2011 | Best Film | The Front Line | Won | |
| Grand Bell Awards | 2011 | Best Director | The Front Line | Nominated | |
| Grand Bell Awards | 2017 | Best Film | A Taxi Driver | Won | |
| Grand Bell Awards | 2017 | Best Director | A Taxi Driver | Nominated | |
| Grand Bell Awards | 2017 | Technical Award | A Taxi Driver | Nominated | |
| Grand Bell Awards | 2017 | Best Planning | A Taxi Driver | Won | |
| Korean Association of Film Critics Awards | 2011 | Best Film | The Front Line | Won | |
| Korean Association of Film Critics Awards | 2011 | Best Director | The Front Line | Won | |
| Korean Association of Film Critics Awards | 2017 | Top 10 Films | A Taxi Driver | Won | |
| Korea Culture & Entertainment Awards | 2017 | Best Film | A Taxi Driver | Won | |
| Korea Culture & Entertainment Awards | 2017 | Best Director (Film) | A Taxi Driver | Won | |
| Korea World Youth Film Festival | 2017 | Favorite Director | A Taxi Driver | Won | |
| The Seoul Awards | 2017 | Grand Prize (Film) | A Taxi Driver | Nominated | |
| Udine Far East Film Festival | 2012 | Audience Award | The Front Line | Won | |

=== Listicles ===
Name of publisher, year listed, name of listicle, and placement
| Publisher | Year | Listicle | Placement | Ref. |
|---|---|---|---|---|
| Sisa Journal | 2017 | Next Generation Leader—Culture, Arts, Sports | 10th (Note: Tied with Song Kang-ho) | |
