= The Front Line (2011 film) =

2011 South Korean Korean War film

- Theatrical release poster
- Hangul: 고지전
- Hanja: 高地戰
- RR: Gojijeon
- MR: Kojijŏn
- Directed by: Jang Hoon
- Written by: Park Sang-yeon
- Produced by: Lee Woo-jeong; Kim Hyeon-cheol
- Starring: Shin Ha-kyun; Go Soo
- Cinematography: Kim Woo-hyung
- Edited by: Kim Sang-bum; Kim Jae-bum
- Music by: Jang Young-gyu; Dalpalan
- Production company: TPS Company
- Distributed by: Showbox
- Release date: 20 July 2011
- Running time: 133 minutes
- Country: South Korea
- Language: Korean
- Box office: US$20.6 million

The Front Line (Korean: 고지전; RR: Gojijeon; also known as Battle of Highlands) is a 2011 South Korean war film directed by Jang Hoon, set during the 1953 ceasefire of the Korean War. This is the third film by director Jang Hoon, after completing Secret Reunion and Rough Cut. It won four Grand Bell Awards, including Best Film. It was selected as South Korea's submission to the 84th Academy Awards for Best Foreign Language Film, but did not make the final shortlist.

== Plot ==
Early in the Korean War in 1950, as the North is rolling through South Korea, South Korean army privates Kang Eun-pyo (Shin Ha-kyun) and Kim Soo-hyeok (Go Soo) are captured in a battle and brought to Korean People's Army captain Jung-yoon. Jung-yoon declares to the prisoners that the war will be over in a week and that he knows exactly why they are fighting the war, before releasing the prisoners, so that they can help reconstruct the nation after the war.

Three years later, in 1953, the war has not ended. Despite ceasefire negotiations, the fighting continues around the hills on the 38th Parallel, as each side fights to determine the future dividing line between North and South. The hills, used as bargaining chips in the negotiations, change hands constantly and so quickly that the ceasefire negotiators do not always know who controls them, yet they are coveted by both sides.

Amidst the fighting, a South Korean officer commanding 'Alligator' Company, fighting at the Aerok Hills, is found dead, killed by a Southern bullet. The now-First Lieutenant Eun-Pyo of the South Korean Army's Counterintelligence Corps (the precursor to South Korea's current Defense Security Command) is sent to investigate the murder and find an apparent mole there who had been mailing letters from Northern troops to into the South.

Eun-pyo arrives at the front lines accompanied by Captain Jae-oh, the replacement commanding officer, and new soldier Pvt. Nam Seong-shik. Eun-Pyo's perceptions change quickly upon arriving at the front. The acting commander, Captain Young-Il, though a skilled soldier, is addicted to morphine, the men actively wear captured enemy uniforms and use Communist vocabulary while talking. War orphans live among the soldiers, the discipline is lax, and the mental health of some men is questionable. Eun-Pyo's old friend Kim Soo-Hyeok reappears, now also a First Lieutenant. A far cry from the cowering incompetent Eun-pyo once knew, he has become a ruthless killer and expert platoon leader. The entire unit also seems burdened about something that happened in Pohang earlier in the war.

Their former captor, Jung-Yoon, is revealed to be commanding the North Korean forces against them; he too is severely strained by the war and is struggling to keep his similarly battered veteran unit together. Captain Jae-oh makes a bad impression by ignoring the veteran officers' experience and makes serious tactical errors. Eun-pyo is stunned after witnessing Soo-hyeok murdering surrendered North Koreans as they do not have time to properly take them prisoner during a raid, before joining the rest of Alligator Company as they retake the hill from Northern hands. When the fighting ends, Eun-pyo discovers Seong-shik inexplicably drunk, leading him to discover Soo-Hyeok and other veteran soldiers enjoying the contents of a secret box buried within a cave in the hill that acts as a mail system and gift exchange between the opposing sides. Once a storage for the Southerners captured by the North, it was first used to trade insults, but evolved into exchanging pleasant letters and presents, with an occasional request for one side to send letters to their families in the other side; explaining the supposed 'mole' in the area. The veterans persuade Eun-pyo to keep quiet about their fraternization.

The winter turns to summer, but the fighting does not stop. During a patrol, Seong-shik is suddenly shot by "Two Seconds," a feared Communist sniper, so named due to the time between a victim being shot and the sound of the gunshot being heard. Although Eun-pyo attempts to save him, Soo-hyeok orders him to leave Seong-shik to die, baiting "Two Seconds" for an artillery strike that fails to kill the sniper. Eun-pyo attempts to hunt down "Two Seconds" alone, eventually subduing the sniper, only to find that 'he' is a female soldier named Cha Tae-kyeong, who is saddened by her having to kill Seong-shik, having recognized him over their battles and gift exchanges. He reluctantly lets her go. Eun-pyo confronts Soo-hyeok over his callousness, further inflamed when Soo-hyeok cruelly mocks one of the disabled children living in the camp, but their argument goes nowhere. Captain Young-il is wounded trying to calm a crazed veteran soldier demanding to see friends who died at Pohang. Upon Eun-pyo's questioning, Soo-hyeok reveals that the company had to abandon many fellow soldiers (namely the men in the now crazed veteran’s unit) during a rout at Pohang to save themselves. With limited boats to evacuate, they even had to open fire & kill them to stay afloat (with a then green & cowardly Young-il being the one to pull the trigger on the landing craft’s machine gun); much to their shame and regret (though that event in the movie which supposedly happened in Pohang seems to be more based on the concluding events of the Battle of Jangsari rather than of what actually happened in the Battle of Pohang). The crazed veteran was the only one in his unit to make it through the machine gun fire & safely onboard the landing craft rendering him the sole survivor of his unit.

The veteran is transferred out, doomed to a dishonorable discharge, and the orphans are evacuated as Soo-hyeok and Young-il re-install discipline and rebuild the men's will to fight.

Later, Chinese forces are deployed in human-wave attacks against the hill. During the battle, Jae-oh breaks under pressure and refuses to retreat, even as they are being overrun, over his subordinates' pleas. Soo-hyeok shoots Jae-Oh dead in front of Eun-pyo, takes command with Young-il, and leads the company to safety. Realizing who he was searching for, Eun-pyo threatens to arrest him for Jae-oh's and the previous company commander's murders. But Soo-hyeok retorts that the two dead leaders were putting them at risk and had to be replaced for the good of the company. Soo-hyeok later falls victim to "Two Seconds," devastating Eun-Pyo and the others.

After the battle, the armistice agreement is signed and both sides begin to celebrate. At a stream, Alligator Company and Jung-Yoon’s men briefly confront each other before quietly parting ways. Back at camp, Alligator Company is reminded by a commanding officer that the ceasefire will only begin in 12 hours, and both armies are ordered to seize as much ground as possible before the final border is set. The survivors of Alligator Company are sent to retake Aerok Hill under fog and a planned U.S. air strike. North Korean troops on the hill begin singing Seong-shik’s old song, and the South Koreans join in, but when the fog lifts a final, brutal battle breaks out in which most soldiers on both sides are killed. In the chaos, Gi-yeong unknowingly kills Seon-chil and then dies from an American airstrike. Tae-Kyeong is stabbed by Eun-pyo after her rifle runs out of ammo, and the badly wounded Captain Shin Young-il is finally shot by the dying Jung-Yoon, leaving Eun-pyo among the only survivors.

Jung-Yoon and Eun-pyo meet in the cave with the gift box. Eun-pyo asks Jung-yoon why exactly they are fighting. Jung-yoon replies that he knew once, but has now forgotten. They suddenly hear on the radio that the armistice has come into effect and all fighting is to cease immediately, to which they burst out laughing. They share a smoke, but Jung-Yoon succumbs to his wounds.

The film ends with a shell-shocked Eun-Pyo walking alone down the devastated, bloodsoaked hill covered by the corpses of all the fallen soldiers, leaving the ultimate fate of Aerok Hill unknown.

== Cast ==
- Shin Ha-kyun as First Lieutenant Kang Eun-Pyo
- Go Soo as First Lieutenant Kim Soo-Hyeok
- Lee Je-hoon as Captain Shin Il-Young, the young company commander.
- Ryu Seung-soo as Oh Gi-Yeong
- Ko Chang-seok as Master-Sergeant Yang Hyo-Sam
- Lee David as Nam Seong-Shik, the recruit.
- Ryu Seung-ryong as Hyeon Jeong-Yoon, the North Korean commander.
- Kim Ok-vin as Cha Tae-Kyeong, the North Korean female sniper, known as 'Two Seconds' due to the time delay between her bullet hitting the target and the sound of the shot.
- Cho Jin-woong as Yoo Jae-ho. The commanding officer deployed to the frontline with Alligator Company along with First Lieutenant Kang Eun-Pyo
- Seo Joon-yeol as tobacco soldier.
- Choi Min as anti-aircraft army officer.
- Jo Min-ho as 2P radio soldier.
- Kim Rok-gyeong as reservist soldier.
- Han Seong-yong as squad leader.
- Ha Su-ho as Third Platoon member.
- Yoon Min-soo as Alligator Company staff sergeant.
- Park Yeong-seo as Hwang Seon-chil, North Korean soldier attached to Jeong-Yoon
- Jung In-gi as Lee Sang-eok. The PTSD South Korean soldier whose entire unit was wiped out in Pohang
- Woo Seung-min.
- Jang In-ho.
- Ha Seong-cheol.
- Seo Hyun-woo.

== Reception ==
On the review aggregator website Rotten Tomatoes, 71% of 17 critics' reviews are positive. On Metacritic, which uses a weighted average, the film holds a score of 59/100 based on 10 critics, indicating "mixed or average" reviews.

== Awards and nominations ==
Year	Award	Category	Recipient	Result	Ref.
2011	20th Buil Film Awards	Best Film	The Front Line	Won	
2011	20th Buil Film Awards	Best Supporting Actor	Ko Chang-seok	Won	
2011	20th Buil Film Awards	Best New Actor	Lee Je-hoon	Won	
2011	20th Buil Film Awards	Best Art Direction	Ryu Seong-hui	Won	
2011	48th Grand Bell Awards	Best Film	The Front Line	Won	
2011	48th Grand Bell Awards	Best Director	Jang Hoon	Nominated	
2011	48th Grand Bell Awards	Best Supporting Actor	Ryu Seung-ryong	Nominated	
2011	48th Grand Bell Awards	Best New Actor	Lee Je-hoon	Nominated	
2011	48th Grand Bell Awards	Best Screenplay	Park Sang-yeon	Nominated	
2011	48th Grand Bell Awards	Best Cinematography	Kim Woo-hyung	Won	
2011	48th Grand Bell Awards	Best Editing	Kim Sang-bum, Kim Jae-bum	Nominated	
2011	48th Grand Bell Awards	Best Lighting	Kim Min-jae	Won	
2011	48th Grand Bell Awards	Best Costume Design	Jo Sang-gyeong	Nominated	
2011	48th Grand Bell Awards	Best Visual Effects	Jeong Seong-jin	Nominated	
2011	48th Grand Bell Awards	Best Sound Effects	Kim Suk-won, Kim Chang-seop	Nominated	
2011	48th Grand Bell Awards	Best Planning	Lee Woo-jeong	Won	
2011	31st Korean Association of Film Critics Awards	Best Film	The Front Line	Won	
2011	31st Korean Association of Film Critics Awards	Best Director	Jang Hoon	Won	
2011	31st Korean Association of Film Critics Awards	Best Screenplay	Park Sang-yeon	Won	
2011	31st Korean Association of Film Critics Awards	Best New Actor	Lee Je-hoon	Won	
2011	32nd Blue Dragon Film Awards	Best Film	The Front Line	Nominated	
2011	32nd Blue Dragon Film Awards	Best Director	Jang Hoon	Nominated	
2011	32nd Blue Dragon Film Awards	Best Actor	Go Soo	Nominated	
2011	32nd Blue Dragon Film Awards	Best Supporting Actor	Ko Chang-seok	Nominated	
2011	32nd Blue Dragon Film Awards	Best New Actor	Lee David	Nominated	
2011	32nd Blue Dragon Film Awards	Best Screenplay	Park Sang-yeon	Nominated	
2011	32nd Blue Dragon Film Awards	Best Cinematography	Kim Woo-hyung	Won	
2011	32nd Blue Dragon Film Awards	Best Art Direction	Ryu Seong-hui	Won	
2011	32nd Blue Dragon Film Awards	Best Lighting	Kim Min-jae	Nominated	
2011	32nd Blue Dragon Film Awards	Best Music	Jang Young-gyu, Dalpalan	Nominated	
2011	32nd Blue Dragon Film Awards	Technical Award (Visual Effects)	Jeong Seong-jin	Nominated	
2011	19th Korean Culture and Entertainment Awards	Best New Actor	Lee Je-hoon	Won	
2011	Cine 21 Awards	Best New Actor	Lee Je-hoon	Won	
2012	14th Udine Far East Film Festival	Audience Award	The Front Line	Won	
2012	48th Baeksang Arts Awards	Best Screenplay	Park Sang-yeon	Nominated	
2012	6th Asian Film Awards	Best Supporting Actor	Lee Je-hoon	Nominated	
2012	6th Asian Film Awards	Best Cinematographer	Kim Woo-hyung	Nominated	
2012	6th Asian Film Awards	Best Production Designer	Ryu Seong-hui	Nominated	

== See also ==
- List of South Korean submissions for the Academy Award for Best Foreign Language Film
- Taegukgi
- All Quiet on the Western Front
