= Jang Young-nam =

South Korean actress (born 1973)

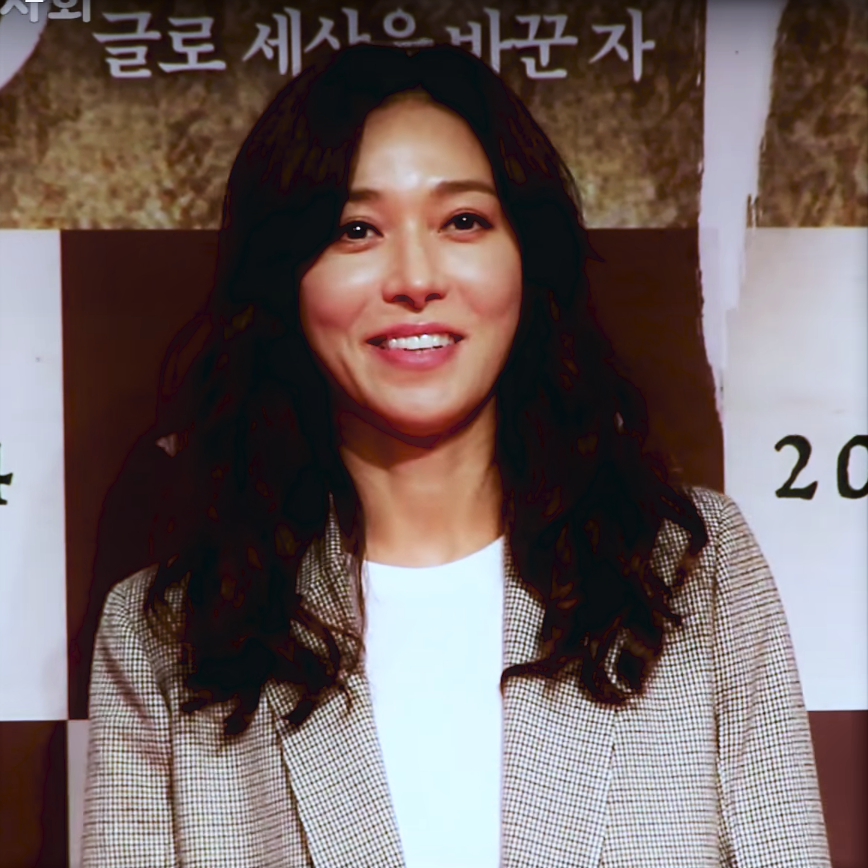
- Jang in February 2018
- Born: November 25, 1973 (age 52); Seoul, South Korea
- Education: Seoul Institute of the Arts - Theater
- Occupation: Actress
- Years active: 1995–present
- Agent: JAM Entertainment
- Spouse: Lee Ho-ung (m. 2011)
- Children: 1

Korean name
- Hangul: 장영남
- Hanja: 張榮男
- RR: Jang Yeongnam
- MR: Chang Yŏngnam

Jang Young-nam (Korean: 장영남; born November 25, 1973) is a South Korean actress. She is skilled in both comedic and dramatic roles and easily transitions between different genres and mediums, including theater, television, and film. Her notable supporting film roles include A Werewolf Boy and Hello Ghost. In 2013, she took on her first leading film role in the crime thriller Azooma. Her performance in the film earned her the Best Actress Award from the Director's Guild at the 17th Busan International Film Festival (BIFF).

Jang began her career in theater before moving to supporting roles in television and film. She was a member of the Korean theater troupe Mokhwa Repertory Company. She is also a member of "Jang Jin's Division" (장진사단), a term used to describe actors who frequently appear in the works of director Jang Jin. She was also an original cast member of the live sketch comedy show Saturday Night Live Korea.

== Education ==
Jang was born on November 25, 1973, in Seoul. During middle school, she decided to further her studies at Kaywon High School of Arts, after being captivated by its distinctive orange school bus and student uniform. Despite her shy personality, she had been too shy to volunteer to read in class in middle school, after studying theater and film at Kaywon Arts High School, she discovered a passion for performing. She subsequently enrolled in the Department of Theater and Film at Seoul Institute of the Arts. As part of her graduation project, she participated in the musical West Side Story.

== Career ==
=== Beginning ===
Upon graduating from the Seoul Institute of the Arts, Jang Young-nam began her career in 1995 with the Mokhwa theater company in 1995, following a recommendation from her senior, Seong Ji-ru. Soon was cast as Juliet in Romeo and Juliet but was dismissed by CEO Oh Tae-seok three weeks before the performance for "inability to act." This incident caused her great distress and led her to leave the theater for 18 months to work as a clothing store clerk. She later said she deeply missed acting during this time, reflecting that "What I wanted to do most and what I was good at was theater," which ultimately led her back to Mokhwa.

=== Rise to Prominence in Theater ===
In 2001, Jang received New Actress Award (Theater) in the 2001 Baeksang Arts Awards for her role as Kikko in Dressing Room. Her first collaboration with director Jang Jin was for the 2002 play Welcome to Dongmakgol. She subsequently took on major roles in other Jang Jin plays like Taxi Driver and appeared in notable productions such as Hwanand Ophelia.^{4} The same year, she was awarded the Dong-A Theater Award for Best Actress for her performance as Juliet in Romeo and Juliet.

In 2005, Jang participated in the Berlin Asia-Pacific Week, performing in the play Princess Bari in Germany. She continued to appear in various productions, including Proof, The Seagull, and the Theater Company Alleyway unit's Gyeong-sook and Gyeong-sook's Father.

In 2007, she found success in the roles of Kyung-sook in play Kyung-sook, Kyung-sook's Father and Joo-hee in play My Mother's Mother. She appeared in various works, often in leading roles. By 2007, Jang had established herself as the most popular and highly regarded actress in the Daehakro theater scene. Her acting skills were widely praised, particularly for her intense portrayal of nine different roles in the one-person play Vagina Monologue.

Jang also became known as the "Hong Il-jeom" (the lone female star) of the "Jang Jin's Division" (장진사단) for her frequent appearances in director Jang Jin's works. In December 2007, Jang starred as the main character in Jang Jin's play, Clumsy People. The performance was part of Daehakro's largest theater festival, "Play," and helped pave the way for the later success of play Heart 2. After her first on-screen role in Jang Jin's 2004 film, A Woman I Know, she appeared in a series of his films, including Leave While Applause (2005), Holy Genealogy (2006), Son (2007), and Good Morning President (2009).

=== Continued Acclaim ===
In 2008, Jang was cast as the female lead in the play Port (May 1–18), which was performed at the Seondol Theater in Daehakro. The play was directed by Park Geun-hyung, the CEO of Theater Company Alleyway and a highly respected director who won the inaugural Cha Beom-seok Play Award. Jang's performance led to numerous offers from the theater world, including a role in Agarwood (June 10–28), directed by Shim Jae-chan.

== Personal life ==
In December 2011, Jang married Lee Ho-ung, a theater director and university professor who is seven years her junior. The couple has a son, born in 2014.

== Filmography ==
=== Film ===
Key
†	Denotes films that have not yet been released

Film acting appearance
Year	Title	Role	Notes/Ref.
1997	Push! Push!		
2003	Runaway	Jung-sook	Short film
2004	Someone Special	Woman in accident	
2005	Murder, Take One	Yoo Jin-ju	
2005	Love Is a Crazy Thing	Eun-joo	
2006	Righteous Ties	Yang Yeo-il	
2007	My Son	Corrections officer	
2007	Hansel and Gretel	Soo-jung ("mother")	
2009	My Girlfriend Is an Agent	Team leader Hong	
2009	Possessed	Su-kyeong	
2009	Goodbye Mom	Editor	
2009	Good Morning President	President Cha Ji-wook's staff adviser 2	
2010	Harmony	Section chief Bang	
2010	The Quiz Show Scandal	Jang Pal-nyeo	
2010	Finding Mr. Destiny	Gi-joon's older sister	Cameo
2010	Hello Ghost	Crying ghost	
2011	Pained	Kye-jung	
2011	Hindsight	Culinary school instructor	
2011	Mr. Idol	Lee Mi-ri	
2012	The Neighbor	Ha Tae-seon	
2012	A Werewolf Boy	Sun-yi's mother	
2013	Azooma	Yoon Young-nam	
2013	Friend: The Great Legacy	Choi Sung-hoon's mother	Cameo
2014	You Are My Vampire	Nam-geol's mother	Cameo
2014	Ode to My Father	Deok-soo's mother	
2015	The Classified File	Eun-joo's aunt	
2016	Remember You	Kim Young-hee	
2016	Love, Lies	San-wol	
2017	RV: Resurrected Victims	Seo Hee-jung	
2017	Confidential Assignment	Park So-yeon	
2017	The King's Case Note	Soo-bin	
2017	Snowy Road	Jong-boon's mother	
2018	What a Man Wants	Dam-deok	
2018	The Negotiation	Manager Han	
2018	Miss Baek	Jung Myeong-sook	
2019	Innocent Witness	Hyun-jung	
2019	Metamorphosis	Choe Myeong-Ju	
2020	Night in Paradise	Tae Goo's sister	Cameo; It premiered on Netflix in 2021.
2020	And So Again Today	[Wife] {My Wife Got Fat}	Short film
2020	My Wife Got Fat	Wife	Short film
2021	Seo Bok	Dr. Im Se-eun	TVING film
2022	Confidential Assignment 2: International	Park So-yeon	
2022	Project Wolf Hunting	Myeong-ju	
2022	Hero	Lady Kim Ah-ryeo	Special appearance
2023	Cobweb	Chairman Baek	
2023	4:00 PM	Hyeon-suk	
2024	The Firefighters	Do-sun	
2024	4:44 : Time Of Fear		
TBA	It Has to Be a Secret †	Jeong-ha	Main lead

=== TV film ===
Year	Title	Role
2015	I'm After You	Nam Kyung-hee

=== Television series ===
Key
†	Denotes television productions that have not yet been released

Year	Title	Role	Notes	Ref.
2003	MBC Best Theater: "Leaving Pippi Longstocking"		one act-drama	
2004	Span Drama: "The Last Day of My Life"		one act-drama	
2006	Drama City: "The Stars Shine Brightly"	Kim Yeon-yi	one act-drama	
2007	Dal-ja's Spring	Uhm Ki-joong's wife		
2007	Drama City: "Ssamdalg Misugi"		one act-drama	
2008	One Mom and Three Dads	Noh Hee-sook		
2008	Bitter Sweet Life	Sung-sook		
2008	Women in the Sun	Lee Eun-bi, TV writer		
2008	Love Marriage			
2008	Chosun Police 2	Cho Seol		
2008	Don't Cry My Love	Oh Jung-rim		
2009	Hero	Jin Do-hee		
2010	I Am Legend	Oh Seung-hye		
2010	Big Thing	Wang Joong-ki, electoral specialist		
2011	I Believe in Love	Kim Eui-sook	Cameo	
2011	Vampire Prosecutor	Yoon Ji-hee	Cameo (episodes 4,8,11)	
2011	Glory Jane	Yeo Eun-joo		
2012	Moon Embracing the Sun	Shaman Ari	Cameo (episode 1)	
2012	I Love Lee Taly	Oh Mi-ja		
2012	Dr. Jin	Noblewoman Jo	Cameo (episodes 7–8)	
2012	The King's Doctor	Baek Kwang-hyun's mother	Cameo (episode 1)	
2012	The Birth of a Family	Ma Jin-hee		
2013	7th Grade Civil Servant	Jang Young-soon		
2013	Jang Ok-jung, Living by Love	Court lady Cheon		
2013	Goddess of Marriage	Kwon Eun-hee		
2014	Pinocchio	Ki Ha-myung's mother		
2015	Persevere, Goo Hae-ra	Kang-soon		
2015	Miss Mamma Mia	Lee Mi-ryun		
2015	Hogu's Love	Pickpocket mom	Cameo (episodes 2, 6)	
2015	Snowy Road	Choi Jong-boon's mother		
2015	Flower of Queen	Choi Hye-jin		
2015	Glamorous Temptation	Kang Il-ran		
2016	Weightlifting Fairy Kim Bok-joo	Coach Choi Sung-eun		
2017	My Sassy Girl	Gyun-woo's Mother		
2017	The King in Love	Princess Jeguk		
2018	Lovely Horribly	Kim Ok-hee		
2018	The Smile Has Left Your Eyes	Tak So-jung		
2019	The Crowned Clown	Queen Dowager Soseong		
2019	My Country: The New Age	Seo Seol		
2020	Nobody Knows	Jeong So-yeon		
2020	Find Me in Your Memory	Choi Hee-sang		
2020	It's Okay to Not Be Okay	Park Haeng-ja / Do Hui-jae		
2021	The Devil Judge	Cha Kyung-hee		
2021	The Veil	Do Jin-sook		
2021	KBS Drama Special: "F20"	Goo Ae-ran		
2022	Cheer Up	Sung Chun-yang		
2023	Crash Course in Romance	Jang Seo-jin		
2023	The Heavenly Idol	King Yeomra		
2023	Delightfully Deceitful	Seo Gye-suk		
2023–2024	Like Flowers in Sand	Ma Jin-sook		
2024	Captivating the King	Royal Queen Dowager Park		
2024	Love Next Door	Seo Hye-sook		
2025	Our Unwritten Seoul	Kim Ok-hee		
2025	tvN X TVING Short Drama Curation 2025: "Housekeeper"	Kwak Hyun-nam	one act-drama	
2026	Final Table	Moon Hae-seon		

=== Web series ===
Year	Title	Role	Note	Ref.
2019	IN SEOUL	Song Young-ju		
2024	The Tyrant	Madam Kwan	Cameo (episode 1)	
2026	The East Palace	Queen Dowager		

=== Variety shows ===
Year	Title	Role	Ref.
2011	Saturday Night Live Korea Season 1	Cast member	
2012	Saturday Night Live Korea Season 2	Cast member	

== Theater ==
Theater play performances
Year	Title		Role	Theater	Date	Ref.
Year	English	Korean	Role	Theater	Date	Ref.
1994	Jing meng guys	징게맹개너른들	Guest	Seoul Arts Center Jayu Small Theater	May 19 to 22	
1995	Romeo and Juliet	로미오와 줄리엣	Juliet	Hoam Art Hall	November 5 to 23	
1996	Love with a Fox	여우와 사랑을	Seong Geum-ja, Huam-dong Aunt	Seoul Arts Center Jayu Small Theater	November 1 to 30	
1996	The Threepenny Opera					
1997	Dongbaek Agasshi "Lady Camellia"	동백아가씨				
1998	The Wandering Troupe	유랑극단				
1998	Birds Don't Use the Crosswalk	새들은 횡단보도로 건너지 않는다				
1999	Bujayuchin "Intimacy Between Father and Son"	부자유친		Theater Arunguji	May 7 to October 3	
1999	Chun-pung's Wife	춘풍의 처		Theater Arunguji	August 10 to October 3	
1999	23rd Seoul Theatre Festival: Kosovo and Wandering	(제23회) 서울연극제 : 코소보 그리고 유랑		Theater Arunguji	October 1 to 17	
1999–2000	Love with a Fox	여우와 사랑을	Seong Geum-ja	Theater Arunguji	December 10 to January 21	
2000	Tae "Lifecord"	태	Lady Park	Theatre YiGina	June 1 to 18	
2000	One Morning with Snow and Rain	아침 한 때 눈이나 비				
2000	The 24th Seoul Theatre Festival: Lost River	(제24회) 서울연극제 : 잃어버린 강	Ha-nok	Cultural Center Grand Theater	October 5 to 11	
2000	Chun-pung's Wife	춘풍의 처				
2001	Dressing Room	분장실	Kikko	Theater Arunguji		
2001	Romeo and Juliet	로미오와 줄리엣	Juliet	Theater Arunguji	June 14 to July 1	
2001–2002	Centipede and Earthworm	지네와 지렁이		Theater Arunguji	December 20 to February 12	
2002	Romeo and Juliet	로미오와 줄리엣	Juliet	Seoul Arts Center Towol Theater	March 29 to April 14	
2002	Regrets of Gwanghae	광해유감	Queen In-mok	Cultural Arts Foundation Arts Theater Grand Theater	November 6 to 13	
2002	Welcome to Dongmakgol	웰컴 투 동막골	Villagers	LG Arts Center	December 14–29	
2003	Proof	프루프	Catherine	National Jeongdong Theatre Cecil	August 20, 2003 – September 28, 2003	
2003	Train for Xian	서안화차	Jeong Soo	Installation Theater Jeongmiso	June 5 to July 6	
2003	Train for Xian	서안화차	Jeong Soo	Installation Theater Jeongmiso	October 4 to 19	
2004	The Journey of a Hwan "Illusion"	극단 여행자의 환	King of the Sea	LG Art Centre	March 19, 2004 – March 26, 2004	
2004	Return to Hamlet	연극열전 - 햄릿	Ophelia	Dongsung Art Centre Dongsung Hall	April 23, 2004 – May 30, 2004	
2004	Return to Hamlet	연극열전 - 햄릿	Ophelia	Dongsung Art Centre Dongsung Hall	May 4 to 23, 2004	
2004	The Hunchback Richard III	꼽추, 리차드 3세	Anne	Seoul Arts Center	November 5 to 28	
2004	Taxi Driver	택시 드리벌 - 당신은 어디까지 가십니까?	Yoo Hwa-yi	Dongsung Art Center Dongsung Hall	July 16 to August 29	
2005	Princess Bari	바리공주		Berlin, Germany		
2005	Agamemnon - The Ghost Sonata	아가멤논 - The Ghost Sonata	Cassandra	Seoul Arts Centre Free Small Theatre	April 23 to May 11	
2006	The Gate of Hell	나생문	Wife	Seoul Arts Centre Free Small Theatre	June 10, 2006 – July 2, 2006	
2006	The Vagina Monologues	버자이너 모놀로그	경숙 역	Daehak-ro Dure Hall 3	September 15, 2006 – November 26, 2006	
2007	Kyung-sook, Kyung-sook's Father	경숙이, 경숙아버지	Kyung-sook	Dongsung Art Centre Small Theatre	January 25, 2007 – April 1, 2007	
2007	Melodrama	멜로드라마	Kang Yu-kyung	Daehak-ro T.O.M. Hall 2	September 6 – December 31	
2007	Who Shaved My Sister's Head?	내 동생의 머리를 누가 깎았나	Yi-geum	Guerrilla Theater in Hyehwa-dong, Seoul	August 10 to 26	
2007	Chinjeong Eomma "My Mom"	친정엄마	Daughter	JTN Art Hall 1	April 12, 2007 – May 6, 2007	
2007–2008	Clumsy People	연극열전2 - 장진의 서툰사람들	Yoo Hwa-yi	Dongsung Art Centre Small Theatre	December 7, 2007 – March 16, 2008	
2008	Port	포트	Rachel Keats	Daehak-ro Sundol Theatre	May 1, 2008 – May 18, 2008	
2009	Don't Be Too Surprised	너무 놀라지 마라|	Daughter-in-law	Sanullim Small Theatre	January 7, 2009 – February 1, 2009	
2009	Don't Be Too Surprised - Busan	너무 놀라지 마라 - 부산	Daughter-in-law	Busan Cultural Centre Middle Theatre	March 28, 2009 – March 29, 2009	
2009	Sergeant Meng Jin-sa's house	맹진사댁 경사	Gab-bun	Myongdong Arts Theatre	June 5 to 21	
2009	Don't Be Too Surprised (Encore)	너무 놀라지 마라 (앵콜)	Daughter-in-law	Sanullim Small Theatre	July 3, 2009, to July 26, 2009	
2009	The Seagull	갈매기	Nina	Daehak-ro guerilla theatre	August 1 to 30, 2009	
2009	Don't Be Too Surprised (Seoul International Performing Arts Festival)	너무 놀라지마라(서울국제공연예술제)	Daughter-in-law	Arko Arts Theatre Small Theatre	November 11 to 15, 2009	
2010	Don't Be Too Surprised - Uijeongbu	너무 놀라지마라 - 의정부	Daughter-in-law	Uijeongbu Arts Centre Small Theatre	February 5 to 6, 2010	
2010	Gyungnam Changnyung-gun Gilgok-myun "Oberösterreich"	경남 창녕군 길곡면	Wife	Dongsung Art Center Small Theater	July 30, 2010 – September 19, 2010	
2011	Sanbul (Forest Fire)	산불	Sawol	National Theatre Haeoreum Theatre	June 5, 2011 – June 26, 2011	
2018	Electra	엘렉트라	Electra	LG Art Centre	April 26, 2018 – May 5, 2018	
2022	Richard III	리차드3세	Queen Elizabeth	Seoul Arts Centre CJ Towol Theatre	January 11, 2022 – February 13, 2022	

== Awards and nominations ==
Year	Award	Category	Nominated work	Result	Ref.
2001	37th Baeksang Arts Awards	Best New Actress in Theater	Dressing Room	Won	
2002	38th Dong-A Theatre Awards	Best Actress	Romeo and Juliet	Won	
2005	The Dong-A Ilbo	Top Actress of the Next Generation		Won	
2009	Korea Theater Awards	Best Actress	Don't Be Too Surprised	Won	
2009	46th Dong-A Theatre Awards	Best Actress	Don't Be Too Surprised	Won	
2009	30th Blue Dragon Film Awards	Best Supporting Actress	My Girlfriend Is an Agent	Nominated	
2011	19th Today's Young Artist Awards	Recipient		Won	
2011	48th Grand Bell Awards	Best Supporting Actress	Hello Ghost	Nominated	
2011	32nd Blue Dragon Film Awards	Best Supporting Actress	Hello Ghost	Nominated	
2012	33rd Blue Dragon Film Awards	Best Supporting Actress	The Neighbor	Nominated	
2012	17th Busan International Film Festival - Director's Guild of Korea	Best Actress	Azooma	Won	
2013	Irvine International Film Festival	Best Actress	Azooma	Won	
2013	50th Grand Bell Awards	Best Actress	Azooma	Nominated	
2013	50th Grand Bell Awards	Best Supporting Actress	A Werewolf Boy	Won	
2013	22nd Buil Film Awards	Best Supporting Actress	A Werewolf Boy	Won	
2013	34th Blue Dragon Film Awards	Best Supporting Actress	A Werewolf Boy	Nominated	
2013	2nd APAN Star Awards	Acting Award, Actress	Goddess of Marriage; Jang Ok-jung, Living by Love; The Birth of a Family	Nominated	
2013	SBS Drama Awards	Special Acting Award, Actress in a Weekend/Daily Drama	Goddess of Marriage	Won	
2015	35th MBC Drama Awards	Best Supporting Actress in a Special Project Drama	Flower of Queen, Glamorous Temptation	Nominated	
2015	36th Blue Dragon Film Awards	Best Supporting Actress	The Classified File	Nominated	
2016	52nd Baeksang Arts Awards	Best Supporting Actress	The Classified File	Nominated	
2016	2016 Scene Stealer Festival	Bonsang Award		Won	
2016	36th MBC Drama Awards	Golden Acting Award, Actress in a Miniseries	Weightlifting Fairy Kim Bok-Joo	Nominated	
2017	37th MBC Drama Awards	Excellence Award, Actress in a Monday-Tuesday Drama	The King in Love	Nominated	
2019	40th Blue Dragon Film Awards	Best Supporting Actress	Metamorphosis	Nominated	
2019	8th Korea Best Star Award (Korean Film Actors Association)	Best Supporting Actress	Metamorphosis	Won	
2020	39th MBC Drama Awards	Best Supporting Actress	Find Me in Your Memory	Nominated	
2020	28th SBS Drama Awards	Excellence Award, Actress in a Miniseries Genre/Action Drama	Nobody Knows	Nominated	
2021	57th Baeksang Arts Awards	Best Supporting Actress (TV)	It's Okay to Not Be Okay	Nominated	
2021	40th MBC Drama Awards	Excellence Award, Actress in a Miniseries	The Veil	Won	
2021	35th KBS Drama Awards	Best Actress in Drama Special/TV Cinema	Drama Special – F20	Nominated	
2025	Asia Contents Awards & Global OTT Awards	Best Supporting Actress	Our Unwritten Soul	Nominated	
