= Hello Ghost (2010 film) =

- South Korean poster
- Hangul: 헬로우 고스트
- RR: Hellou goseuteu
- MR: Hellou kosŭt'ŭ
- Directed by: Kim Young-tak
- Written by: Kim Young-tak
- Produced by: Lim Sung-bin; Choi Moon-soo
- Starring: Cha Tae-hyun; Kang Ye-won
- Cinematography: Kim Yung-chul
- Edited by: Kim Sun-min
- Music by: Kim Jun-seok
- Distributed by: Next Entertainment World
- Release date: 23 December 2010
- Running time: 111 minutes
- Country: South Korea
- Language: Korean
- Box office: US$19.7 million

Hello Ghost (Korean: 헬로우 고스트) is a 2010 South Korean comedy film about a man's multiple suicide attempts. After the most recent one, he discovers he can see a group of ghosts. The ghosts agree to leave him alone under the condition that he fulfill their requests.

The film was the 9th highest grossing Korean film in 2010, with a total of 3,042,021 admissions nationwide. The Chosun Ilbo commented that the film was good for families. Cha Tae-hyun found his role challenging, especially because it required him to smoke cigarettes, which he does not do in real life.

== Plot ==
Sang-man is a depressed man who is unsure of his past and who his family is. He attempts to commit suicide by overdosing on pills, but fails. He then jumps off a bridge into a river, but is saved. Brought to the hospital, Sang-man awakens and sees a man smoking next to him. He tells the other hospital patrons, but no one believes him, as they cannot see this man. During his stay in the hospital he eventually meets four other people nobody can see: a young, elementary school student; an old man; and a sad young woman who frequently cries. Sang-man discovers that they are not people, or hallucinations of his, but ghosts. Meanwhile, Sang-man meets nurse Jung Yun-soo at the hospital, becomes attracted to her, and feels the urge to flirt with her, but does not.

After being discharged from the hospital, Sang-man goes back to his apartment, followed by the ghosts. He asks why they are there, but doesn't get an answer. He visits a shaman to ask for help. He learns that the ghosts are using his body to experience their unfulfilled desires, and he cannot die until they have moved on. After a few unsuccessful attempts to get rid of them, Sang-man gives up. He agrees to help the ghosts, in exchange for them leaving him alone so he can die.

The old man ghost wants to return a camera he took from his friend while he was alive back to his friend. The smoker ghost wants to get his taxi back and drive it. The kid ghost wants to watch a cartoon movie. The last ghost wants to cook and to eat together with people she cares about. Sang-man does these things to appease the ghosts (as well as swimming at the beach at the smoker ghost's request), at first feeling odd about it, but these events also lead to him getting to know Yun-soo better.

Yun-soo's father dies, and his ghost asks Sang-man to deliver a message to her, along with a gift that he wanted to give her before his death but could not. Sang-man delivers her the message and tells her that it is from her father, but Yun-soo does not believe him and tries to push him away, growing more hysterical about his father's death, but she realizes that Sang-man is telling the truth when she sees her father's last gift for her, and is affectionately drawn to him, and the two become good friends.

Despite his friendship with Yun-soo, Sang-man remains rather sad, and cannot shake his suicidal urges. He tells the ghosts to leave him alone, having fulfilled their requests. When he wakes up the next morning, the ghosts are gone. Locking himself up in the taxi, he prepares to commit suicide by CO poisoning. However, he gains a new appreciation for his life as he thinks upon how he helped the ghosts and his friendship with Yun-soo, and abandons his suicide plans. He asks Yun-soo out for lunch, and she accepts. She tells him of a patient that recently died, a boy who lost all memories of his parents from extreme shock. When Yun-soo asks about the parsley in the kimbap, Sang-man remembers that his mother used to put parsley in kimbap instead of spinach. To his shock, Sang-man recalls his mother's face, and realizes that the crying ghost was his mother.

He runs to his apartment, fully recalling the true identities of the ghosts: his father was the smoker, his grandfather the old man, and his older brother the kid. On a family trip, the taxi his father drove and was hit by a truck and pushed off a road. Sang-man, the only survivor, lost his memory and grew up in an orphanage, and realizes that the ghosts returned to him in particular in the hopes that he would remember them, and that Yun-soo told him about that patient because she suspected he had lost his memory for a similar reason. Sang-man tearfully apologizes for sending the ghosts away and calls out to them. One by one they appear, thank him for remembering them, and assure him he is not alone, aiding him in learning to combat his depression.

The movie ends with a series of photos taken of Sang-man, from his school days, his graduation, to his wedding with Yun-soo. In every photo, the ghosts of his family member appear, but even in photograph form they are visible only to him.

In the post credit scene, Yun-soo finds the photos and remarks on how he is alone in most of them, as she cannot see the ghosts in the picture. Their young son asks about the people standing around him. Sang-man realizes the little boy can see ghosts too.

== Cast ==
- Cha Tae-hyun as Sang-man
- Kang Ye-won as Jung Yun-soo
- Lee Mun-su as Older Ghost
- Ko Chang-seok as Smoking Ghost
- Jang Young-nam as Crying Ghost
- Chun Bo-geun as Elementary School Student Ghost

== Remake ==
The remake rights was bought by American film production company 1492 Pictures in February 2011, with Chris Columbus and Adam Sandler reportedly attached.

In 2023, remakes were released in Indonesia (Hello Ghost) as well as in Taiwan (Hello Ghost).

== Awards and nominations ==
| Year | Award | Category | Recipient | Result |
|---|---|---|---|---|
| 2011 | 47th Baeksang Arts Awards | Best Actor (Film) | Cha Tae-hyun | Nominated |
| 2011 | 47th Baeksang Arts Awards | Best New Director (Film) | Kim Young-tak | Won |
| 2011 | 48th Grand Bell Awards | Best Actor | Cha Tae-hyun | Nominated |
| 2011 | 48th Grand Bell Awards | Best Supporting Actress | Jang Young-nam | Nominated |
| 2011 | 48th Grand Bell Awards | Best New Director | Kim Young-tak | Nominated |
| 2011 | 48th Grand Bell Awards | Best Screenplay | Kim Young-tak | Nominated |
| 2011 | 32nd Blue Dragon Film Awards | Best Supporting Actress | Jang Young-nam | Nominated |
| 2011 | 32nd Blue Dragon Film Awards | Best New Director | Kim Young-tak | Nominated |
