= Kim Young-tak =

South Korean film director and screenwriter (born 1976)

- Born: 1976 (age 49–50); South Korea
- Occupations: Film director, screenwriter

Korean name
- Hangul: 김영탁
- RR: Gim Yeongtak
- MR: Kim Yŏngt'ak

Kim Young-tak (Korean: 김영탁; born 1976) is a South Korean film director and screenwriter. Kim wrote and directed the comedy film Hello Ghost (2010). The comedy was a local hit - the 9th highest grossing Korean film in 2010, and won him the Best New Director (Film) at the 47th Baeksang Arts Awards in 2011. In 2018, Kim released the thriller novel Gomtang about a time traveller who travels from 2063 to Busan of 2019 and is confronted with a series of murders there. While initially published online, it was also published physically in two volumes.

== Filmography ==
- A Bold Family (2005) - script editor
- BA:BO (2008) - screenwriter
- Hello Ghost (2010) - director, screenwriter
- Slow Video (2014) - director, screenwriter

== Bibliography ==
- Gomtang (곰탕, 2018)
- Gomtang 2 (곰탕 2, 2018)

== Awards and nominations ==
Year	Award	Category	Recipient	Result
2011	47th Baeksang Arts Awards	Best New Director (Film)	Hello Ghost	Won
2011	48th Grand Bell Awards	Best New Director	Hello Ghost	Nominated
2011	48th Grand Bell Awards	Best Screenplay	Hello Ghost	Nominated
2011	32nd Blue Dragon Film Awards	Best New Director	Hello Ghost	Nominated
