= Yi Ga-hwan =

Korean scholar-official (1742–1801)

Yi Ga-hwan (Korean: 이가환; Hanja: 李家煥; RR: I Gahwan; MR: Yi Kahwan; 1742–1801) was a Korean scholar and official of the late Joseon period, known for his mastery of astronomy and mathematics. A member of the Namin faction, he rose to senior office under King Jeongjo. His opponents accused him of leading the followers of Western learning, and he died under interrogation in the Catholic persecution of 1801.

== Family ==
Yi belonged to the Yeoju Yi clan. His courtesy name was Jeongjo, and his pen names were Geumdae and Jeongheon. His father was the writer Yi Yong-hyu. His grandfather was a brother of the scholar Yi Ik, which made Yi Ga-hwan Yi Ik's great-nephew. The Catholic convert Yi Seung-hun was his sister's son. Yi's family was a prominent Namin household, but it had been kept out of power since the Namin lost office in 1680.

== Career ==
Yi passed the lower civil service examination in 1771 and the higher examination in 1777. He then served in the Ministry of Rites, where he compiled the Chungwanji, a record of the ministry, and in 1785 he helped compile the Daejeon tongpyeon, a revised law code.

His career advanced further after the Namin leader Chae Je-gong became a state councillor in 1788. Yi was appointed a royal secretary several times, and in the early 1790s he became magistrate of Gwangju. In 1792 he was named head of the national academy, Sungkyunkwan, but resigned after opposition from its students and from officials. He later held the post twice, in 1793 and 1794.

== Catholicism ==
Yi had read Catholic works such as The True Meaning of the Lord of Heaven and judged that, however well argued, they were not orthodox learning. When he heard that Yi Byeok was preaching the new religion, he went to argue with him, but was won over instead. He borrowed Catholic books from Yi Byeok and studied them, and he kept close company with Catholics such as Yi Byeok, Gwon Cheol-sin and Jeong Yak-yong. His opponents therefore called him a leader of the heterodox religion, although it is not clear whether he was ever baptised.

During the persecution of 1791, Yi was arrested as a Catholic and then released. After becoming magistrate of Gwangju, he took the lead in suppressing Catholics, and he continued to do so after he was demoted to Chungju in 1795.

== Accusations and death ==
In 1795 Yi was appointed Minister of Works, but officials of the rival Noron faction opposed him because of his links to Western learning. Later that year an official named him as a central figure of Western learning, and he was implicated in the secret arrival of the Chinese priest Zhou Wenmo. He was sent away from the capital as magistrate of Chungju. In 1799 another memorial attacked him as being at the centre of a "den of heterodox learning".

Jeongjo died in 1800. In 1801 the court began the large-scale persecution of Catholics. Yi was arrested on the charge of being a leader of Western learning, and he died in prison that spring after being flogged during questioning by the State Tribunal. Sources give different dates for his death.

== Scholarship ==
Yi was expert in astronomy and mathematics. He could calculate solar and lunar eclipses and the angle between the ecliptic and the celestial equator, and he set out calculations of the Earth's circumference and diameter with diagrams. Jeongjo valued his talent, and Jeong Yak-yong was deeply influenced by his learning. His surviving works include Geumdae yugo, Geumdae jip and Geumdae simuncho, but most of his writings have been lost.

== See also ==
- Wijeong cheoksa
