= Yi Sŏu =

Korean scholar-official

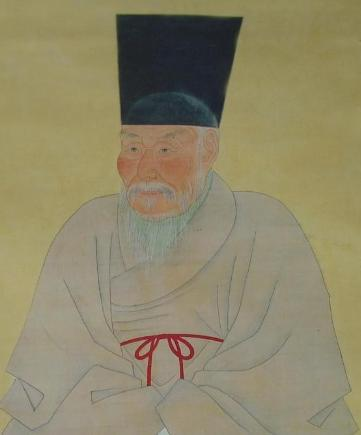

Korean name
- Hangul: 이서우
- Hanja: 李瑞雨
- RR: I Seou
- MR: I Sŏu

Art name
- Hangul: 송곡
- Hanja: 松谷
- RR: Songgok
- MR: Songgok

Courtesy name
- Hangul: 윤보, 휴징
- Hanja: 潤甫, 休徵
- RR: Yunbo, Hyujing
- MR: Yunbo, Hyujing

Yi Sŏu (Korean: 이서우; Hanja: 李瑞雨; March 1, 1633 – October 14, 1709) was a Korean scholar-official of the Joseon period. An early silhak writer, he was a member of the Southerners political faction.

== Works ==
- Songp'a munjip (송파문집; 松坡文集)
- Kangsa (강사; 康史)
- Changsanhuji (장산후지; 萇山後誌)
- Tongnaesŭngnamsŏhuji (동래승람서후지; 東萊勝覽書後誌)

== See also ==
- Hŏ Mok
- Yun Hyu
- Yun Sŏndo
- Yu Hyeongwon
- Yi Ik
