= Yi Pyŏk =

Korean Catholic leader (1754–1785)

- Born: 1754; Pocheon-gun, Gyeonggi Province
- Died: 1785 (aged 30–31); Seoul, Korea
- Other names: Deok-jo (德操), Gwang-am (曠庵)
- Occupation: Scholar
- Known for: One of the first Korean Catholic converts

Korean name
- Hangul: 이벽
- Hanja: 李檗
- RR: I Byeok
- MR: I Pyŏk

Art name
- Hangul: 광암
- Hanja: 曠庵
- RR: Gwangam
- MR: Kwangam

Courtesy name
- Hangul: 덕조
- Hanja: 德操
- RR: Deokjo
- MR: Tŏkcho

Yi Pyŏk (Korean: 이벽; Hanja: 李檗, 1754-1785) was a scholar of Korea’s later Joseon period who, in 1784, played a leading role in the foundation of Korea's first Catholic community. It is reported in one source that his original name was Yi Taek-jo.

== Biography ==
=== Early years ===
Yi Pyŏk was born in 1754 in Hwahyeon-ri, Naechon-myeon, Pocheon-gun, Gyeonggi Province, Joseon. His courtesy name was Tŏkjo (덕조; 德操), his art name was Kwangam (광암; 曠庵). His father was Yi Puman (이부만; 李溥萬; 1727-1817) of the Gyeongju Yi clan. His mother was a member of the Cheongju Han clan. He was the second son among six children.

His grandfather Yi Kŭn had held a high rank in the army, and his father, elder brother Yi Kyŏk (이격; 李格), and younger brother Yi Sŏk (이석; 李晳) were also military officials. Yi Pyŏk was remarkably tall, and his father tried to make a soldier of him; but from an early age he refused, earning himself the nickname Pyŏk, (either 蘗, (corktree) or 僻, implying isolation and oddity) for his stubbornness.

His family belonged to the Namin faction, which included many families residing in Gyeonggi Province, and as such, except for a few years when Yi Pyŏk was alive, were excluded from holding office by the factional politics of the Joseon period. This exclusion from power might explain why many of the scholars from these families pursued studies, which indicated their dissent from orthodox Neo-Confucianism. Yi Pyŏk decided at an early age not to study for the national examinations, which were necessary for a career in government administration. Instead, he chose pure scholarship, focusing on the Chinese Confucian classics, studying the Four Books and the Five Classics as a matter of course.

Yi Pyŏk's great-grandfather, Yi Kyŏngsang, had accompanied Crown Prince Sohyŏn (1612-1645) during the eight years that he spent in China. It is likely that he brought back books written by the Jesuit missionaries (“Western Learning”), including those about Catholicism which Yi Pyŏk later studied.

The writings of Yi Ik inspired many of the scholars who adopted silhak. Yi Pyŏk and the other scholars with whom he explored the tenets of Catholicism in the following years were surely no exception.

=== Jeonjin-am ===
In 1777 (according to Dallet) or 1779 (according to Chŏng Yagyong), the Namin scholar Kwŏn Ch'ŏlsin (권철신; 權哲身, 1736-1801) seems to have started a series of study sessions for his pupils and other scholars that, like him, were influenced by the Silhak-inspired writings of his teacher, Yi Ik.

These meetings were held in a remote mountain hermitage, Jeonjinam, which belonged to the temple Jueosa near Gwangju, Gyeonggi.

The meetings were probably intended as an ongoing seminar to gain a better understanding of human life through renewed study of the Chinese classics, as well as the books introducing European knowledge that had been written in Chinese by Matteo Ricci and other Jesuits. If there were books about Catholicism among them, they seem only to have given a very shallow presentation of the faith. Dallet began his Histoire with a description of Yi Pyŏk's difficult journey to join the group.

Among those present in the group were Chŏng Yakchŏn (丁若銓, 1758-1816), whose wife was Yi Pyŏk's sister (who had died by 1784) and (perhaps) Mancheon Yi Sŭnghun (蔓川 李承薰, 1756-1801) whose wife was the sister of Chŏng Yakchŏn. Yi Pyŏk's wife (Kwŏn Ryuhandang) was a niece of Kwŏn Ch'ŏlsin, being the daughter of his brother Kwŏn Ilsin (權日身, 1742-1792).

=== Conversion to Catholicism ===
Dallet reports that it was Yi Pyŏk who, on hearing in 1783 that Yi Sŭnghun was to accompany his father on the annual embassy to Beijing, urged him to contact the Catholic priests there and be baptized, then bring back more information. This he duly did, receiving baptism early in 1784. He returned to Korea bringing books and objects of devotion.

Yi Pyŏk seems to have taken some time to study the books before declaring himself convinced. He then set about evangelizing those around him, including Kwŏn Ch'ŏlsin and his younger brother Kwŏn Ilsin.

In the Chach'an myojimyŏng (autobiographical epitaph) written later by Chŏng Yagyong there is an account of a moment in April 1784 when Yi Pyŏk first told him about Catholicism and showed him a book. Chŏng Yagyong had a very high opinion of Yi Pyŏk's intellectual skills, especially after receiving his help in 1784 in formulating a reply to the king's questions about Confucian philosophy, a reply that greatly impressed the king by its “objectivity”.

Jean Sangbae Ri remarked that the theory regarding the emanation of Le and Ki had originated with Yi Pyŏk, who was following Yi Hwang; Chŏng Yagyong then began following the ideas expressed by Yi I. The baptism of these first converts, including Yi Pyŏk, is said to have happened in September 1784, whereupon Yi Pyŏk took the name Jean Baptist. It is not clear whether Chŏng Yagyong was among those who were baptized then.

His older brother Chŏng Yakchong was destined to become the main leader of the community along with Yi Sŭnghun and died for his faith in the persecution of 1801.

There was an immediate hostile reaction to the new religion, about which little was as yet known, among the more strictly Confucianist scholars. There was opposition even among the Namin faction.

The silk letter written in 1801 to the Bishop of Beijing by Alexander Hwang Sayŏng included a lengthy account of the origins of the Korean church. In it, he tells how Yi Kahwan (李家煥, 1742-1801), who had risen to be Minister of Justice (형조판서; 刑曹判書), and was one of the most senior members of the faction and a very great scholar, tried to argue with Yi Pyŏk, but ended up being converted by him. He was martyred in 1801.

=== Arrest and death ===
Early in 1785, the growing group of believers and sympathizers moved their regular gatherings for worship from the house of Yi Pyŏk to that belonging to another convert, Kim Pŏmu, on the hill where Myeongdong Cathedral now stands. Kim was not an aristocrat as so many of the others were. Almost immediately, the authorities raided the house, suspecting it of being a gambling den, and were embarrassed on finding it full of nobles. A report by a government agent to the Minister of Justice lists those acting as leaders: Yi Sŭnghun, the brothers Chŏng Yakchŏn, Chŏng Yakchong, Chŏng Yagyong, Kwŏn Ilsin, with Yi Pyŏk taking the leading role as teacher during the ceremony.

All were arrested, the books that were found were confiscated, and the nobles were then sent home with a warning not to continue. However, Kim Pŏmu was tortured, exiled, and finally executed since he was not of noble birth.

Dallet (Vol 1 pages 28–9) says that Yi Pyŏk was put under intense pressure from his father until finally, more or less, he gave up the faith. He was tormented by remorse until he died of the plague in 1786. A different account of his death is given by Antton Iraola who reported that he died on 14 June 1785, after 15 days of constant prayer, during which he neither ate nor slept. What seems clear is that his family, under strong pressure from the Confucian leaders that were hostile to the Namin and their newly found foreign faith, kept him more or less imprisoned in his home. There is no record of any communication addressed to the Catholic community emanating from him after the arrest.

The group's leadership was taken by Yi Sŭnghun, who seemed to have established a native hierarchy, at least before the Bishop of Beijing intervened to stop it.

Yi Pyŏk's life is poorly documented and the main source for much information about him is the rather dramatized account in Dallet's Histoire de l’église de Corée (2 vols, 1874), which relied heavily on translations of documents sent to France by Bishop Daveluy (Dallet, Histoire, Vol.1, Introduction, page xi).

== Works ==
- The only surviving texts written by Yi Pyŏk are found in a volume containing a collection of writings by the first Korean Catholic believers, known as Manch'ŏn yugo (만천유고; 蔓川遺稿), which was discovered in about 1970. Manch'ŏn was the art name of Yi Sŭnghun, whose writings occupy a major part of the book, But it also contains two poetic works attributed to Yi Pyŏk, the Hymn of Adoration of the Lord of Heaven (천주공경가; 天主恭敬歌), and above all, much longer and more complex, the Essence of Sacred Doctrine (성교요지; 聖敎要旨; Sŏnggyo yoji). Both are translated into French in the book by Jean Sangbae Ri; unfortunately, there seems to be no English translation.
- The title to the Hymn indicates that it was composed at the temple Jueosa in 1779.
- The Sŏnggyo yoji is especially interesting by its combination of Christian teaching and the Confucian classics, especially the Great Learning and the Doctrine of the Mean. There is no indication of when it was composed, although it shows a deeper knowledge of Christianity, including stories from the Bible, which suggest a time after Yi Pyŏk's study of the books brought from Beijing by Yi Sŭnghun.

== Grave ==
On June 21, 1979, the grave of Yi Pyŏk was discovered by chance at his birthplace. His remains were reinterred alongside those of Yi Sŭnghun, Yi Kahwan, the Kwŏn brothers, and Chŏng Yakchong at the Catholic shrine that was erected on the site of Jeonjinam.

== See also ==
- Roman Catholicism in South Korea
- Korean Martyrs
