= Wijeong cheoksa =

Neo-Confucian movement in late Joseon Korea

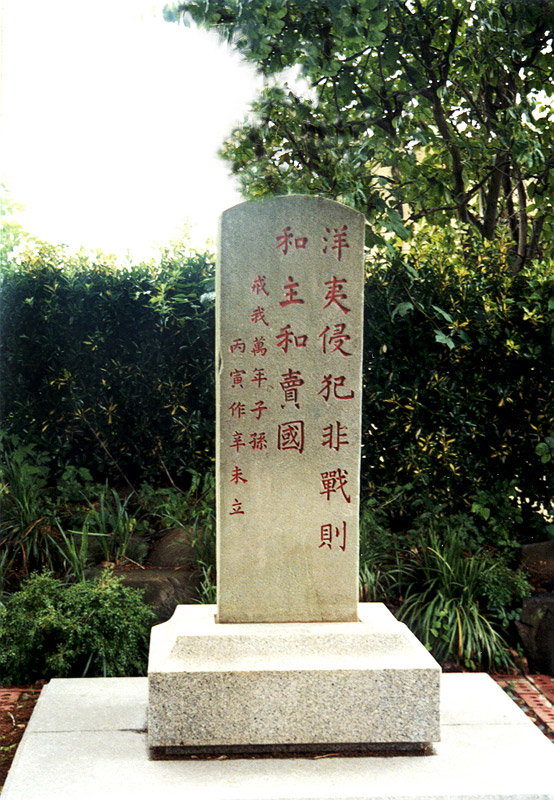
An anti-Western stele (cheokhwabi) on Gadeokdo

Wijeong cheoksa (Korean: 위정척사; Hanja: 衛正斥邪; lit. "defend orthodoxy, reject heterodoxy") was a Neo-Confucian political and intellectual movement in Korea from the late Joseon period to the Korean Empire. Its followers, often called the Wijeong cheoksa faction (위정척사파), set out to protect Neo-Confucian orthodoxy and to reject Catholicism, Western learning and, later, Western and Japanese influence. The movement is also known as cheoksa wijeong (척사위정).

The idea goes back to the distinction between civilisation and barbarism drawn by the Song dynasty philosopher Zhu Xi. It first took political form under King Jeongjo in the late 18th century, when it was used against Catholics and other followers of Western learning. After the French and American attacks on Korea in 1866 and 1871, the regent Heungseon Daewongun made it national policy. From the 1870s its scholars opposed the opening of Korea and the reforms of the enlightenment faction, and from 1895 they led many of the righteous armies that fought Japan.

== Name ==
The phrase first appears in the historical record in a reply King Jeongjo gave in 1791 to scholars who had asked him to punish the Catholic convert Yi Seung-hun. The king told them to go back to their studies and work harder at "the way of defending orthodoxy and rejecting heterodoxy".

Scholars in late Joseon identified themselves by their teacher–pupil lineages and had no single name for the movement. After 1945, historians grouped together the schools that had raised righteous armies under the banner of wijeong cheoksa in 1894 and 1895, such as the Hwaseo, Nosa, Jeongjae and Namdang schools, and called them the Wijeong cheoksa faction. The first academic paper to define the group was published in 1949. Some historians, including Yi Yi-hwa, have preferred the reversed form cheoksa wijeong, but wijeong cheoksa remains the usual term.

== Background ==
=== Ideas ===
The movement rested on the Hua–Yi distinction, the Neo-Confucian division of the world into the civilised (hua) and the barbarian (yi). Zhu Xi lived while the Song dynasty was losing its northern lands to the Jin, and he argued that making peace with the Jin was "defeat before battle".

Neo-Confucianism became the state ideology of Joseon. After the Ming dynasty fell and the Manchu Qing dynasty took Beijing in 1644, Joseon scholars refused to accept the Qing, whom they had regarded as barbarians, as the heirs of Chinese civilisation. The Noron faction led by Song Si-yeol developed the idea of sojunghwa ("little China"), which held that Joseon had inherited civilisation after the fall of the Ming. This idea later became the basis of wijeong cheoksa.

=== Persecution of Catholics ===
In its first phase, wijeong cheoksa meant defending Neo-Confucianism against Western learning, especially Catholicism. Several leading members of the Namin faction studied Western learning and some became Catholics, which gave their political rivals a way to attack them. Jeongjo made clear that he regarded Neo-Confucianism as the true learning and Catholicism as heterodox, but he did not widen the persecution. After his death, many Catholics were executed in the Sinyu Persecution of 1801. In the same year, officials discovered a secret letter by the Catholic Hwang Sa-yeong asking France to send troops to secure religious freedom. Asking a foreign power for troops was treated as treason, and Catholicism was then banned outright. Further persecutions followed in 1839, 1846, 1860 and 1866.

=== Western ships ===
Western ships appeared off Korea more and more often in the 19th century. The Joseon court learned of the Second Opium War and of Russia's gain of the land east of the Ussuri River under the 1860 Convention of Peking, and it sent envoys to China to assess the situation. In 1866 the American merchant ship General Sherman sailed up the Taedong River. After its crew detained a Korean officer and killed several people, the provincial governor, Park Gyu-su, had the ship destroyed. From this time Westerners were called yangi ("Western barbarians"), applying the old Hua–Yi idea to the new threat. Park later became known as a founder of the enlightenment thinking, but in 1866 he still held the wijeong cheoksa view that Catholicism was heterodox.

Later in 1866, France attacked Ganghwa Island in reprisal for the execution of French missionaries. In 1871 an American fleet attacked the island again. Both forces withdrew, and Heungseon Daewongun treated their withdrawal as a victory. After 1871 he set up anti-Western stelae across the country. Their inscription read: "Western barbarians invade. Not to fight is to make peace; to urge peace is to betray the country." Confucian scholars were in bitter conflict with the regent over his closure of most private academies (seowon) in 1871, but they strongly supported the stelae and his isolation policy.

== Political movement ==
In 1866 Yi Hang-ro, founder of the Hwaseo school, sent a memorial to the throne urging the king to fight the invaders rather than make peace. In the same year, Ki Jeong-jin of the Nosa school argued that the real aim of the Western demand for trade was to make Korea a dependency, as had happened when Beijing was overrun in the Second Opium War. The schools disagreed on many questions of Neo-Confucian metaphysics, but they shared the Hua–Yi outlook.

In 1873 Yi Hang-ro's pupil Choe Ik-hyeon sent a memorial criticising the regent's government. Choe was exiled for it, but the memorial helped bring about the Daewongun's fall, and the movement emerged as a political force separate from him. Its scholars argued that trade with the West would let heterodox teachings such as Catholicism spread and would destroy Joseon. For the Hwaseo school, keeping the Neo-Confucian world view mattered more than strengthening the dynasty itself. Unlike the queen's relatives and the reformers, most of these scholars stayed out of office and acted as an outside political force. The reformers answered with the doctrine of dongdo seogi ("Eastern ways, Western tools"), which kept Confucian values but accepted Western technology.

=== Opening of Korea ===
Before the Japan–Korea Treaty of 1876 was signed, Choe Ik-hyeon argued that Japan and the West were one and the same (waeyang ilche). He submitted a memorial against the treaty with an axe beside him, to show that he was ready to die for his view. The treaty was signed anyway, but the protest made Choe a symbol of the movement and turned it openly against Japan.

In 1880 the court circulated A Strategy for Korea, written by the Chinese diplomat Huang Zunxian, which urged Korea to ally with China, Japan and the United States against Russia. In 1881 about ten thousand scholars from the Yeongnam region, led by Yi Man-son, signed a joint memorial against it. King Gojong calmed the petitioners but did not change his policy. The movement lost its hold on the court after the Imo Incident of 1882 and the Gapsin Coup of 1884.

== Righteous armies ==
The movement regained strength after the assassination of Queen Min and the order to cut topknots in 1895. Its scholars led the Eulmi righteous armies, which condemned the government's reforms as "Japanisation". Commoners, including former Donghak fighters, joined these armies, but the scholar leaders still saw the Donghak as heretics and kept strict class lines.

After the Japan–Korea Treaty of 1905, Choe Ik-hyeon raised his own army. In 1907, after the Korean army was disbanded, the righteous armies formed the Thirteen-Province Army and tried to march on Seoul, but it broke up when its commander, Yi In-yeong, left to mourn his father. Historians criticise the movement for ignoring how the world was changing and for defending pre-modern privilege, but credit its members with acting on their words when the country was in danger.

== Legacy ==
Under Japanese rule, Confucianism came to be seen as outdated, and the movement was pushed to the margins of the Korean independence movement. Im Byeong-chan and his followers tried to restore the monarchy in the 1910s, but most independence activists turned to new ideas such as liberalism, socialism and anarchism. The Provisional Government of the Republic of Korea, founded in 1919, declared itself a democratic republic.
