= Mandeoksan (Jeonnam-Gwangju) =

Mountain in South Korea

Coordinates: 35°47′N 127°16′E

Highest point
- Elevation: 409 m (1,342 ft)

Geography
- Location: Jeonnam-Gwangju, South Korea

Korean name
- Hangul: 만덕산
- RR: Mandeoksan
- MR: Mandŏksan

Mandeoksan (Korean: 만덕산) is a mountain of Jeonnam-Gwangju, southwestern South Korea. It has an elevation of 409 metres.

== Trail ==
- Gangjin Baseurak-gil: it is home to BaekRyeon Temple, camellia groves and the House of Dasan - a house that Chŏng Yagyong stayed in while in exile. He was often referred to as "Dasan" and is known as a great thinker of the late Joseon period (1392-1910). It is a sacred mountain where "Dasan" and "Haejangseonsa" of Baengnyeonsa built a friendship and ancient Koreans left trails of their lives over many years. Mount Mandeok is connected to another mountain called Mount Seokmun and there is a viaduct that links the two mountains.

*Course: BaekRyeon Temple - Dasanchodang - Majeom village - Yongmun Temple - Seokmun park - Soseokmun - Doam Middle School- Doammyeon office (5 miles, 2 hours 30 minutes. Level: Moderate)

== See also ==
- List of mountains of Korea
