= Chibong yusŏl =

1614 encyclopedia by Yi Sugwang

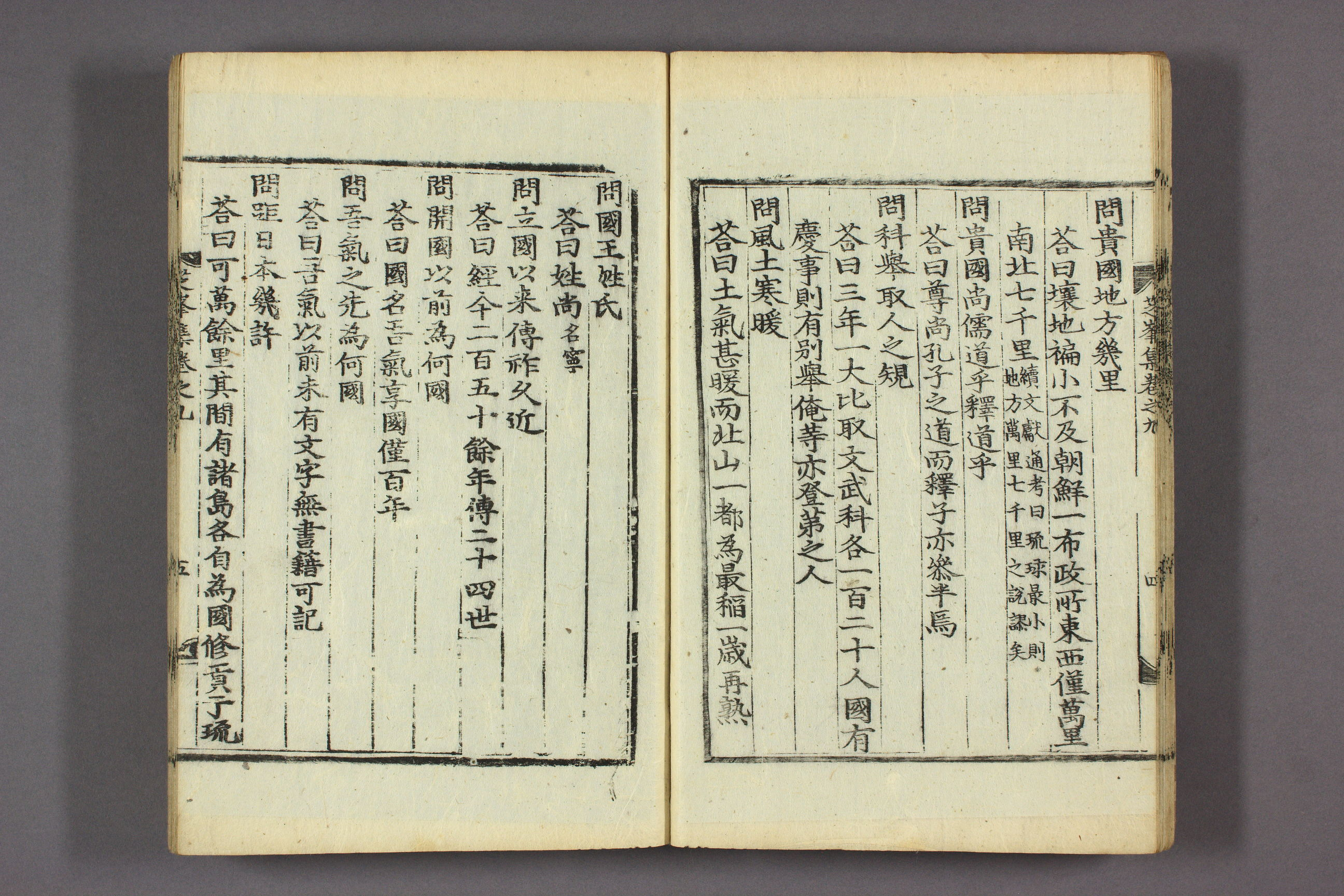
- Chapter detailing brushtalks between Korea and the Ryukyu Kingdom

Korean name
- Hangul: 지봉유설
- Hanja: 芝峰類說
- Revised Romanization: Jibong yuseol
- McCune–Reischauer: Chibong yusŏl

Chibong yusŏl (Korean: 지봉유설; Hanja: 芝峰類說; lit. 'Topical Discourses of Chibong') is a Korean encyclopedia written by Yi Sugwang. It was published in 1614 during the reign of King Gwanghaegun. The author was a silhak scholar and a military officer of the mid-Joseon period of Korea. The title came from his pen name, Chibong and yusŏl which literally means "topical discourses" in Korean.

== Overview ==
Parts of the book are drawn from Yi's experiences in the Ming Dynasty, meeting people from modern day Italy, Thailand, Vietnam, Okinawa. After the Imjin wars from 1592 to 1598, Yi Sugwang worked in the Ming Dynasty. In China, he acquired several books written on Catholicism by an Italian priest, Matteo Ricci, who was living in China. He brought them back to Korea, which was the first time European literature had been brought into the country. He took great interest in Catholicism.

From the information he obtained from the trips, he wrote a 20-volume encyclopedia, with the title Chibong yusŏl. Chibong yusŏl contained not only information on Catholicism and China, but also on Japan, Vietnam, and Thailand. It had basic information on Europe, including the geography and weather of England, European cuisine, European weapons and the knowledge of astronomy that the author had acquired from China.

Yi visited China several times and even met Thai people (known then as Sŏmna people, 섬라사람) and recorded their customs. He also had contact with emissaries from Vietnam and Okinawa.

== See also ==
- Silhak
- Sallim kyŏngje
- Korean studies
