= The Jehol Diary =

18th century Korean travelogue

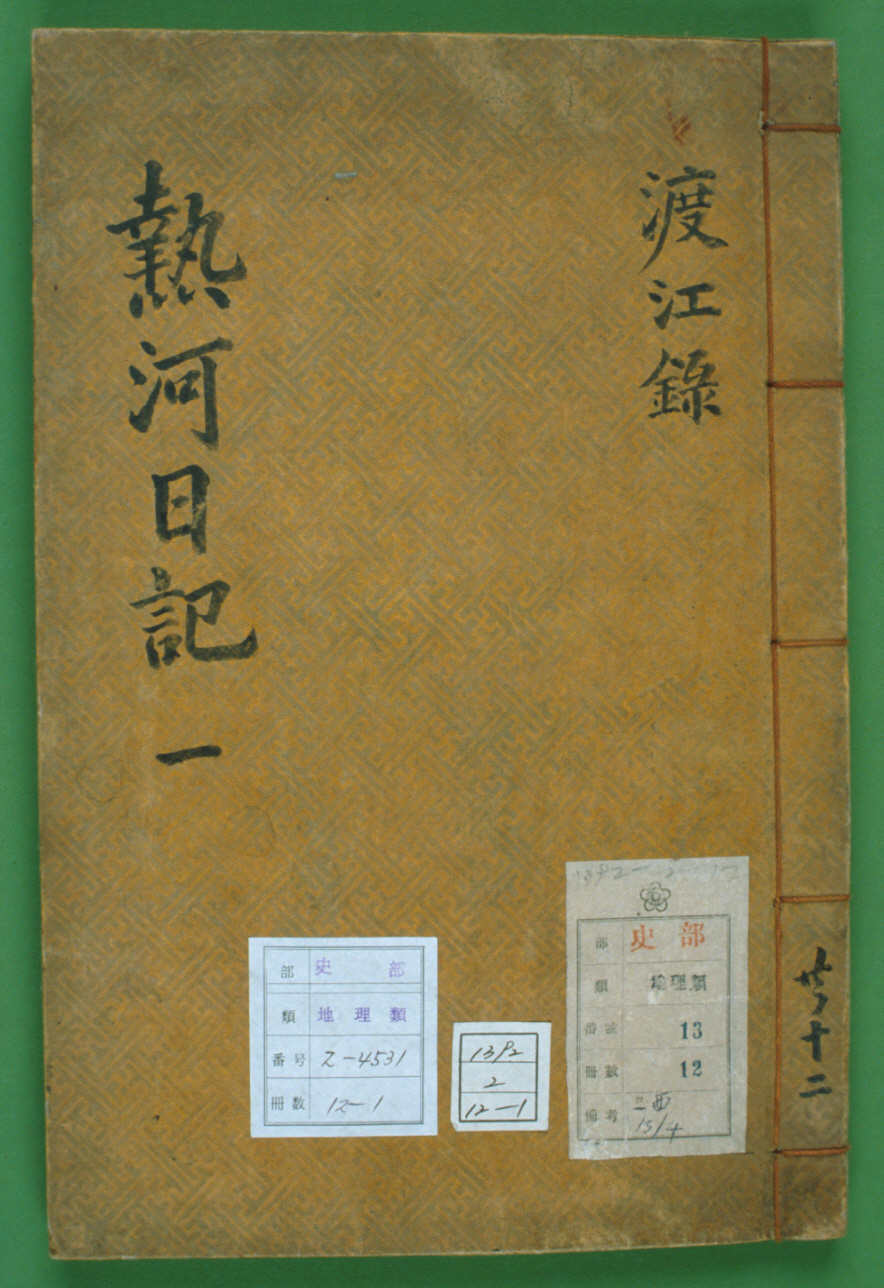
- Volume 1 of the Jehol Diary in Pak's collected works
- Author: Pak Chiwŏn
- Language: Hanja
- Published: 1901
- Publication place: Joseon
- English publication date: 2010

- The Jehol Diary
- Hangul: 열하일기
- Hanja: 熱河日記
- Revised Romanization: Yeolha Ilgi
- McCune–Reischauer: Yŏrha Ilgi

The Jehol Diary (Yŏrha Ilgi) is a work by the Joseon dynasty silhak scholar Pak Chiwŏn, written in classical Chinese. Pak, also known by his pen name of Yŏnam (燕巖), made an extensive tour of what was then the northern territory of the Chinese Qing Empire, including Shenyang, Beijing and Jehol (Today's Chengde, Hebei), in 1780, in the company of his cousin. Pak's cousin had been dispatched to the Qing imperial court by the Joseon king Jeongjo to attend the 70th birthday celebrations of the Qianlong Emperor.

The Yŏrha Ilgi (the result of the trip) takes the form of a travelogue. However, the scope of the diary is vast, covering such disparate topics as history, customs, natural surroundings, politics, economics, and poetry. Both the scope of the work and the quality of its writing have earned it a place as a masterpiece and an important source for Chinese and Korean historians. It originally circulated in manuscript form, and was first printed as part of Pak's collected works in 1901, with another edition in 1911. A partial English translation was published in 2010 under the title The Jehol Diary.

== Contents ==
The Yŏrha Ilgi is divided into twenty-six chapters in ten volumes. The chapter headings are as follows:

Prologue (서 序)

=== 1. Togangnok (도강록; 渡江錄) ===
This is a 15-day record from the Yalu River, which shows interest in the welfare of the use of ligature and bricks.

=== 2. Sŏnggyŏng chapchi (성경잡지; 盛京雜識) ===
This is a five-day collection of events from Shilihe (十里河) to Xiaoheishan (小黑山).

=== 3. Ilsin sup'il (일신수필; 馹汛隨筆) ===
It is a description of the area encompassing the bridge from Xin Guangning (新廣寧) to Shanhai Pass.

=== 4. Kwannae chŏngsa (관내정사 關內程史) ===
It is a record of travel from Shanhai Pass to Yanjing. In particular, it features a story about Baek-I and Sukje, and a story entitled 'Hojil'

=== 5. Makpuk haengjŏngnok (막북행정록 漠北行程錄) ===
It is a five-day record from the Yanjing to Jehol.

=== 6. T'aehak yugwannok (태학유관록 太學留館錄) ===
It is a discussion with Chinese scholars in Taixue about the theory of sturaculture.

=== 7. Kuoe imun (구외이문 口外異聞) ===
It is sixty different stories heard outside the Old North Gate.

=== 8. Hwanyŏn tojungnok (환연도중록 還燕道中錄) ===
It describes the transportation system as a six-day record that returns to Yanjing from heat.
