= Sallim kyŏngje =

17th-century Korean encyclopedia

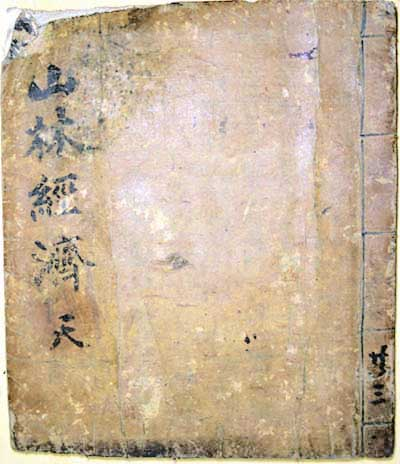
- Cover of Sallim kyŏngje

Korean name
- Hangul: 산림경제
- Hanja: 山林經濟
- Revised Romanization: Sallim gyeongje
- McCune–Reischauer: Sallim kyŏngje

Sallim kyŏngje (Korean: 산림경제; Hanja: 山林經濟; lit. 'Farm Management') is a Korean-language book regarding living and farming written by Hong Mansŏn (洪萬選, art name Yu Am (流巖), 1643-1715). The book was written around the turn of the 18th century. It consists of four books and sixteen chapters and is regarded as one of the most important Korean works of the period. It is the first book in Korea to describe the cultivation of chili peppers.

== Contents ==
=== Book One ===
- Seo (序): Prologue
- Bok Geo (卜居): The building of houses
- Sup Saeng (攝生): Health
- Chi Nong (治農): The growing of cotton, grain, and other special plants
- Chi Po (治圃): The growing of vegetables, flowers, tobacco

=== Book Two ===
- Jong Su (種樹): The growing of fruits and trees
- Yang Hwa (養花): The trimming of flowers and garden plants
- Yang Jam (養蠶): Beekeeping
- Mok Yang (牧養): The farming of animals, fish, and bees
- Chi Seon (治膳): The storing, cooking, and processing of food

=== Book Three ===
- Gu Geup (救急): Emergency treatments
- Gu Hwang (救荒): Emergency procedures for droughts
- Byeok On (辟瘟): Ways to stop contagious diseases
- Byeok Choong (辟蟲): How to get rid of pests

=== Book Four ===
- Chi Yak (治藥): Medicine
- Sun Taek (選擇): The choosing of lucky and unlucky days and directions
- Jap Bang (雜方): How to take care of swords, pottery, musical instruments and other things

== See also ==
- Siŭijŏnsŏ
- Chibong yusŏl
- Sarye p'yŏllam
- Chŭngbo sallim kyŏngje
