= Yi Ik (disambiguation) =

Several Koreans have borne the name Yi Ik. They are most readily distinguished by their pen names:

- Ganong Yi Ik (1579–1624), official exiled during the reign of Gwanghaegun of Joseon
- Nongjae Yi Ik (1629–1690), high official under Hyeonjong of Joseon and Sukjong of Joseon
- Seongho Yi Ik (1681–1763), early Silhak philosopher and social critic
