= Hong Taeyong =

Korean scholar (1731–1783)

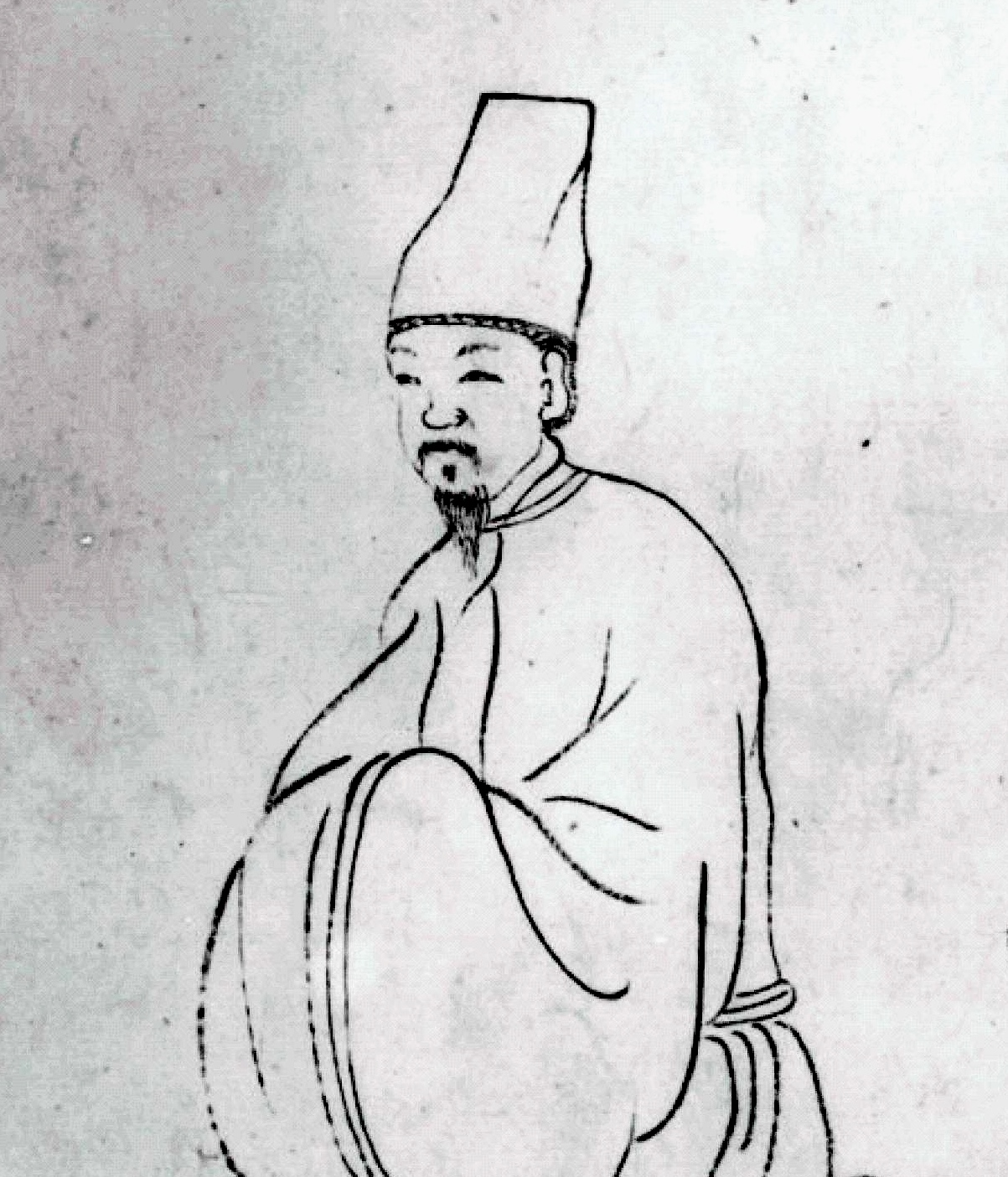
- Born: 12 May 1731; South Chungcheong Province, Joseon
- Died: 17 November 1783 (aged 52); Hanseong, Joseon
- Other name: Damheon

Philosophical work
- Region: Korean Confucianism
- School: Silhak
- Notable works: Books of Relaxed House
- Notable ideas: Earth's rotation, Anti-Anthropocentrism

- Hong Taeyong
- Hangul: 홍대용
- Hanja: 洪大容
- RR: Hong Daeyong
- MR: Hong Taeyong

Art name
- Hangul: 담헌
- Hanja: 湛軒
- RR: Damheon
- MR: Tamhŏn

Hong Taeyong (Korean: 홍대용; Hanja: 洪大容; 12 May 1731 – 17 November 1783), art name Tamhŏn (담헌; 湛軒; lit. 'Relaxed House'), was a philosopher, astronomer and mathematician of the late Joseon Kingdom.

Hong was an early leader of the Profitable Usage and Benefiting the People (이용후생파; 利用厚生派; Iyong Husaengpa) school of thought. It worked to promote the industrialization of his country and the development of trade by positively introducing Western technologies to Joseon Korea. Hong was a friend of Pak Chiwŏn, who was another leader of the Profitable Usage school.

== Biography ==
Hong Taeyong was born in 1731 in Cheonan, South Chungcheong Province. In his early days, Hong was educated by Kim One-hang of Seock-sil Seowon. During this period, traditional Neo-Confucianism formed the basis of his academic world. In 1765, Hong followed his uncle Hong Eock (홍억; 洪檍), who was in Joseon missions to Imperial China. In China, Hong witnessed a brilliant development of Qing Dynasty and experienced culture shock. After returning to Joseon, Hong insisted enhancing the national prosperity.

In 1774, Hong was recommended as a mentor for the crown prince, who afterwards would be King Jeongjo. Hong discussed many topics and themes with the crown prince. Although the prince was satisfied with Hong's studies and polymathy, they had different views. The crown prince demanded Hong to go into government service and serve him, but Hong refused. He then wrote Journal as the Mentor of Crown Prince (계방일기; 桂坊日記) about their debates.

After King Jeongjo ascended the throne following the death of the King Yeongjo, Hong was appointed as a local county governor, but had to resign and go back to Seoul when his mother's health deteriorated in 1782. In 1783, his mother regained her health, but Hong had a sudden stroke. He would not make it by morning, and died the next day. It was 23 October according to the Lunisolar calendar and 17 November 1783 according to the Solar calendar.

== Works ==
Hong was interested in astronomy and mathematics. Inspired by Western science, he supported the idea that the Earth rotated diurnally and criticized other Joseon intellectuals' Sinocentric worldviews.

Like his mentor Kim Won-haeng, he was part of the Nakhak school of thought, which rejected anthropocentrism and believed that humans and nature shared a similar essence and origin. He was also a prominent advocate of the Pukhak movement, which advocated that the Joseon government should follow Qing China's example when reforming society.

After failing the gwageo a few times, Hong gave up and became absorbed in astronomy research. He wrote Catechism of Eusan mountain (의산문답; 醫山問答), which contains the concepts of Earth's rotation and the equality among species and the infinity of outer space. In mathematics, Hong wrote Interpretation and Usage of Mathematics (주해수용; 籌解需用). He also wrote Travel Essay of Yanjing in 1765 and 1766 (을병연행록; 乙丙燕行錄), a journal about his travel to China.

== Legacy ==
Hong's works, including Catechism of Ui mountain, Interpretation and Usage of Mathematics, Journal as the Mentor of Crown Prince were compiled to collection, Books of Relaxed House (담헌서; 湛軒書). His practical Confucian ideas were succeeded by Pak Chiwŏn and Pak's disciples.
