= Jean-Baptiste-Joseph de Grammont =

French missionary (1736 – c. 1812)

Jean-Baptiste-Joseph de Grammont (1736–1812?) was a French Catholic missionary in China under the Qing dynasty.

Originally a Jesuit, Grammont served at the Qing court in Beijing as a mathematician and musician between 1768 and 1785. In 1784, he baptized the Korean prince Yi Sŭnghun in Beijing. In 1787, he was in Canton acting as procurator for the French missionaries in Beijing under the Canton System. That year, he conveyed the French government's offer to help crush the Lin Shuangwen rebellion. Following the start of the French Revolution, he returned to Beijin in 1791. In 1793, he offered his services to the Macartney Embassy. Of that embassy he wrote: "Never was an embassy deserving of better success ... and yet, strange to tell, never was there an embassy that succceded so ill!" He blamed Macartney's refusal to kowtow and his assessment was widely read in Europe. It influenced the Dutch mission to China in 1794–1795. Grammont, however, was not permitted to meet with the Dutch. He praised the embassy for having succeeded where Macartney's failed.
