= Pak Chega =

Joseon Dynasty philosopher (1750–1815)

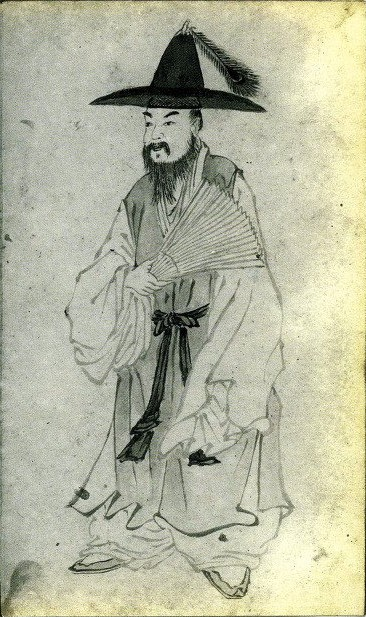
- Pak Chega (1790)

Korean name
- Hangul: 박제가
- Hanja: 朴齊家
- RR: Bak Jega
- MR: Pak Chega

Art name
- Hangul: 초정
- Hanja: 楚亭
- RR: Chojeong
- MR: Ch'ojŏng

Pak Chega (Korean: 박제가; Hanja: 朴齊家; November 5, 1750–1805) was a Korean philosopher. He was of the school of Practical learning (Silhak) in the late Joseon Dynasty. He was a student of Pak Chiwŏn.

== Background ==
Pak Chega was a famous Silhak scholar in the late Joseon Dynasty. He was a student of another famous Silhak scholar, Pak Chiwŏn. Pak Chega was born in 1750 and died in 1815. Pak Chega went to the Qing dynasty after becoming a student of Pak Chiwŏn. He learned about China's modern culture, advanced techniques, and its economic system while there. After returning from Qing, Pak Chiwŏn worked in Jiphyeonjeon, a place where important scholars and scientists worked, during the time of King Jeongjo.

== Legacy ==
Because the Joseon government supported 'Yuhak', a neo-Confucianist conservative ideology, Pak Chega had an important role and his desire was to make Joseon rich in science and commerce.

He authored several books; the compilation is titled, Jeongyungyp. He wrote about making the commerce system stronger in Umyoungnomchogo and Gunyeonjib. At that time, it was quite shocking to believe in Silhak, whose ideas opposed Yuhak.

Pak Chega developed the way of agriculture, and he also enhanced some of the farming machinery to cultivate plants.

== Bukhak theory ==
He argued that using the cart to develop local commerce and at the same time develop strong ships to actively enter foreign trade in his book, <Bukhakui>. He called for improving the reality and proactively embracing the culture of the Qing Dynasty. He argued for the abolition of Joseon's status system, and considered commerce and industry important. He said, " If we actively take advantage of the natural environment of Joseon, which is surrounded by the sea on three sides, and develop it into maritime trade, the national power will become strong and the livelihood of the people will be stabilized."

== Books ==
- Bukhagui (북학의 北學議) :
- Jeongyujip (정유집 貞否集)
- Myeongnongchogo (명농초고 明農草稿)
- Hangaekgeonyeonjip (한객건연집 韓客巾衍集)
- Sigo (시고 詩稿)
- Muyedobotongji (무예도보통지 武藝圖譜通志)
