= Seo Yu-gu =

Korean scholar (1764–1845)

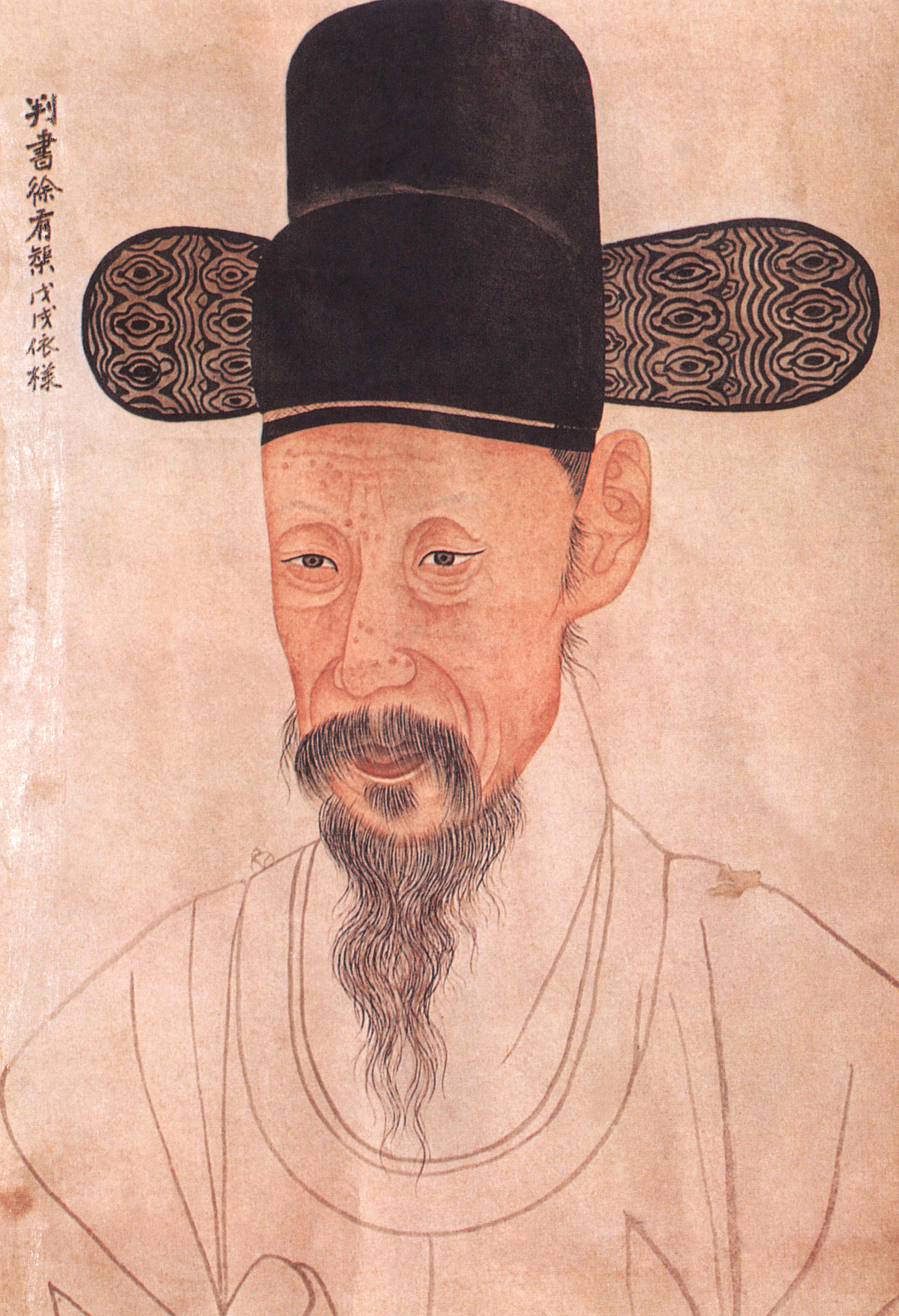

Korean name
- Hangul: 서유구
- Hanja: 徐有榘
- RR: Seo Yugu
- MR: Sŏ Yugu

Art name
- Hangul: 풍석
- Hanja: 楓石
- RR: Pungseok
- MR: P'ungsŏk

Courtesy name
- Hangul: 준평
- Hanja: 準平
- RR: Junpyeong
- MR: Chunp'yŏng

Posthumous name
- Hangul: 문간
- Hanja: 文簡
- RR: Mungan
- MR: Mun'gan

Seo Yu-gu (Korean: 서유구; Hanja: 徐有榘; 1764–1845) was a Korean Neo-Confucian scholar, agricultural administrator and encyclopedist in the Korean Joseon Dynasty. His pen name was Pungseok (풍석; 楓石; lit. 'Maple Stone'), his courtesy name was Junpyeong (준평; 準平), and his posthumous name was Mungan (문간; 文簡). He came from the Daegu Seo clan (대구 서씨; 大丘徐氏).

Seo was born at Jangdan, Paju, Gyeonggi-do in 1764. At that time, the practical science called Silhak (실학; 實學) was prevalent among the Joseon intellectuals, but it was rarely adopted by the Royal Court. He authored the huge 113 volume encyclopedia, Imwon Gyeongjeji (임원경제지; 林園經濟志) for more than 30 years from 1806. Though the series of Encyclopedia Koreana on Rural Living were not published in his lifetime, Seo Yu-gu wished to teach his fellow gentlemen how to live wonderful lives in the country.

== Biography ==
=== Family background ===
Seo Yu-gu's family history was highly respectable. His great-grandfather was Seo Jong-ok (서종옥; 徐宗玉) who served as the minister of interior. His grandfather was Seo Myeong-eung (서명응; 徐命膺), who was the head of the Royal Academy. His father, Seo Ho-su (서호수; 徐浩修), also served as the minister of the interior. He was adopted to his uncle Seo Cheol-su (서철수; 徐澈修).

=== Career ===
Following his family tradition, Seo passed both the state examination and the king-ordered specific selection test (초계문신; 抄啓文臣) in 1790, and was appointed as the country governor in rural areas.

Like his father and grandfather, both of whom were interested in agriculture and farming and authored some agricultural books, Seo collected many books about agriculture at home and from China. While staying at Sunchang, Jeolla-do, he made a suggestion to King Jeongjo that agricultural specialists should be stationed to each province to research and experiment with indigenous farming technologies of the country and that the whole collection of such research results be published to help and educate farmers and citizens in the country. Though his suggestion was not adopted by the Royal Court, it was the beginning of his own encyclopedia.

In 1806, when his uncle was expelled from the government as an accomplice to treason, Seo Yu-gu went into a self-imposed exile. He stayed in his farmland for 18 years. Later, returning to the capital city, he served as the minister of interior, minister of finance and the chief of the Royal Library.

In his self-imposed exile, Seo came back to his hometown at Jangdan and practiced farming and fishing, sometimes making food and rice wine by himself. For more than thirty years, he was engaged in writing and editing the volumes of his life's work with one collaborator—his son. Upon completion, Seo tried without success to publish the whole series. He died at the age of 82.

== Works ==
In a word, Imwon Gyeongjeji could be applied to the daily life of not only ordinary Confucian gentlemen but also peasants in the country.

The Encyclopedia Koreana on Rural Living is the life-long works of Seo Yu-gu who successfully incorporated his knowledge and experiences into his own framework of informed encyclopedic volumes based on hundreds of references from Korea as well as China. As he made a careful citation, the readers could made a list of all references some of which are not available today. This book provides resources for the study of Korean history of science and technology, particularly agricultural technology. The author's understanding of environmental connections between heating systems, forest degradation and bare mountains display a holistic analysis of landscape. His historical approach to the development of costume led to suggestions of adaptation for the sake of daily practicalities.

=== Contents ===
The 113-volume Encyclopedia Koreana on Rural Living contains 2,520 thousand Classic Chinese characters and 28 thousand items in 16 areas.

1. Farming (본리지; 本利志) Volumes 1-13 (13) cover general process of farming from plowing a field, planting seeds to harvesting, and include field allotment, irrigation, cultivation, fertilizer, improvement of soil quality, agricultural climate, and even illustrations of farming equipment and irrigation system.
2. Edible plants and Herb (관휴지; 灌畦志) Volumes 14-17 (4) deal with various edible plants and herb medicine including various vegetables, sea weed, and cultivation and usage of those plants.
3. Horticulture (예원지; 藝畹志) Volumes 18-22 (5) deal with 50 kinds of flowers and garden plants explaining cultivation, watering, timing of sowing and appropriate soil.
4. Fruit trees and wood (만학지; 晩學志) Volumes 23-27 (5) explain 31 kinds of fruits and 15 kinds other vines including pumpkin, water melon and cucumber, and 25 kinds of trees.
5. Silk and fabrics (전공지; 展功志) Volumes 28-32 (5) explains how to raise mulberry and silkworms, and how to obtain silk from silkworms, and how to make and dye silk fabric, and to make and use other fabric.
6. Weather and climate (위선지; 魏鮮志) Volumes 33-36 (4) deal with weather, climate and astrology related with agriculture.
7. Stock farming and fishery (전어지; 佃漁志) Volumes 37-40 (4) deals stock farming, fostering, hunting and fishery including kinds of domestic animals, fish and wildlife, their diseases and medicine.
8. Food and brewery (정조지; 鼎俎志) Volumes 41-47 (7) introduce various recipes of Korean food and nutritious meals on the basis of medical knowledge. A variety of seasoning and spices, and 160 methods of brewing traditional wines.
9. Architecture and home appliances (섬용지; 贍用志) Volumes 48-51 (4) cover construction of houses, related technologies, measurements, appliances and tools with illustrations in comparison with those of China.
10. Well-being and health (보양지; 葆養志) Volumes 52-59 (8) are treaties about well-being, dietary treatment and health by month, and meditation based on Taoism.
11. Medicine and famine relief food (인제지; 仁濟志) Volumes 60-87 (28) deal with medicine and therapies, and 260 kinds of famine relief food in the end.
12. House ceremonies (향례지; 鄕禮志) Volumes 88-90 (5) explain ceremonial occasions and rituals in the country.
13. Reading and hobbies (유예지; 游藝志) Volumes 91-98 (6) deal with reading, archery and other useful techniques for gentlemen.
14. Leisure life (이운지; 怡雲志) Volumes 99-106 (8) deal with gentlemen's cultural hobbies and leisure.
15. Geology (상택지; 相宅志) Volumes 107-108 (2) describe the geology of Korea as a whole.
16. Economy and business (예규지; 倪圭志) Volumes 109-113 (5) deal with economic life, savings and thrift, accumulation of wealth, trading and industry including the dates of country market across the nation..

=== Collection ===
Notwithstanding the practical nature of the books, the author was not affluent enough to publish the huge volumes at his own expenses without any subsidy from the government. At that time, few bureaucrats could acknowledge the practical value of his works.

So there remain only three copies: original at Seoul National University Gyujanggak Library (규장각; 奎章閣), one copy at Korea University Library. Another copy maintained by Seo family clan is preserved at the Osaka City Library.

=== Translation and publishing ===
Only a part of the works have been translated into Korean and published step by step in a series because of financial constraints. Their first introductory book Imwon Gyeongjeji was published in June 2012 by Sower Publishing Co.

This project for the translation and publication of Imwon Gyeongjeji has been staged by the Imwon Gyeongje Institute (임원경제연구소) founded by Jeong Myung-hyun and his fellow researchers in March 2008.

The speed of work on this project is very slow because most of its participants are part-timers. In 2015, they hosted an experimental event in association with Pungseok Cultural Foundation (풍석문화재단). Their purpose was to prove that Seo was a great chef by actually making several dishes as illustrated in Imwon Gyeongjeji.

== Other works ==
- Nanho Eomokji (난호어목지; 蘭湖魚牧志) regarding fishery and livestock farming
- Nupan-go (누판고; 鏤板考)
- Haengpoji (행포지; 杏浦志) describing rural life
- Geumhwa Gyeongdok-gi (금화경독기; 金華耕讀記)
- Jongjeobo (종저보; 種藷譜) explaining how to cultivate sweet potato imported from Japan
- Hyangrye Happyeon (향례합편; 鄕禮合編) regarding manuals for country rituals
- Collection of Pungseok (풍석전집; 楓石全集)
- Beongye Poetry (번계시고; 樊溪詩稿): Seo Yu-gu's collection of poetry from 1838 through 1840.

== Legacy and assessment ==
Contrary to the prevailing trend of the learned in the 19th Century, Seo Yu-gu studied and collected books and materials of practical use like what to eat, what to use, where to live, how to enjoy hobbies in a daily rural living. He criticized his fellow gentlemen who were inclined to the conceptual or literary works and Confucian classics. He mocked that they liked to speak of conceptual meals of soup cooked with soil and cakes made of papers (토갱지병; 土羹紙餠), Instead, he recommended a practical approach to becoming well and prosperous in rural life.

Thus far, his works have not seen full publication. Firstly, the entire series is too big to be easily copied and translated into plain Korean. Secondly, there is a famous scholarly rival of the same time named Dasan Jeong Yak-yong (정약용; 丁若鏞), whose works have been widely translated into Korean and other languages.
