= Choe Ik-hyeon =

Joseon-era Korean scholar (1834–1906)

Choe Ik-hyeon 최익현 of the Gyeongju Choe clan
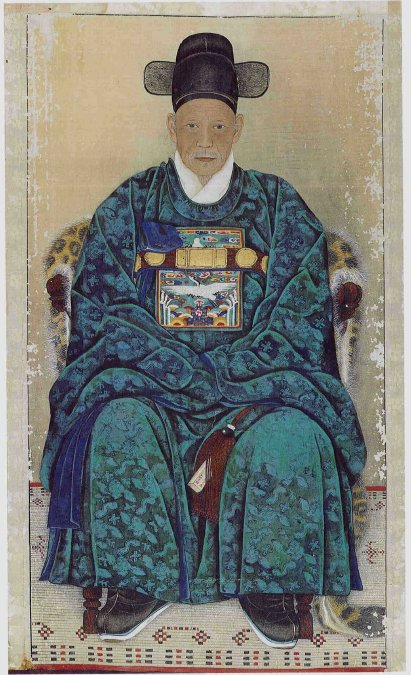
- Portrait of Choe Ik-hyeon by artist Chae Yong-shin
- Born: 1833; Gachae, Naebuk-myeon, Pocheon-hyeon, Gyeonggi Province, Joseon
- Died: 1906 (aged 72); Tsushima Province, Japan
- Other name: Choi Ik-hyeon / Choi Ik-hyun
- Education: Past Royal Exam in 1855
- Occupations: Scholar; Politician; Philosopher; Independence Activist; General of the Korean Righteous Army guerrilla forces
- Years active: ?–?
- Known for: Become the strong supporter of Neo-Confucianism and defended Korean sovereignty in the face of Japanese imperialism.
- Political party: Westerners
- Children: Choe Yeong-jo (1st son); Choe Yeong-hak (2nd son); Choe Yeong-bok (3rd son)
- Father: Choe-Dae
- Relatives: Choe Chang-kyoo (grandson)
- Awards: 1962 Medal of Merit for the Republic of Korea (1962년 건국훈장 대한민국장 추서)

Korean name
- Hangul: 최익현
- Hanja: 崔益鉉
- RR: Choe Ikhyeon
- MR: Ch'oe Ikhyŏn

Art name
- Hangul: 면암
- Hanja: 勉庵
- RR: Myeonam
- MR: Myŏnam

Courtesy name
- Hangul: 찬겸
- RR: Changyeom
- MR: Ch'an'gyŏm

Childhood name
- Hangul: 최기남
- RR: Choe Ginam
- MR: Ch'oe Kinam

Choe Ik-hyeon (Korean: 최익현; Hanja: 崔益鉉; 1833–1906, also transliterated as Choe Ik-hyun) was a Korean Joseon Dynasty scholar, politician, philosopher, and general of the Korean Righteous Army guerrilla forces. He was a strong supporter of Neo-Confucianism and a very vocal nationalist, who defended Korean sovereignty in the face of Japanese imperialism.

== Early life ==
Choe Ik-hyeon was born in Pocheon, Gyeonggi Province and passed the civil service examination in 1855, beginning his service under the 25th Joseon King, Cheoljong of Joseon, as a government official and administrator of various offices. He continued serving under the Heungseon Daewongun and later his son, King Gojong of the Korean Empire.

== Impeachment of Daewongun ==
In 1872, 20-year-old Gojong son of regent Daewongun seemed ready to take the throne, but the Daewongun showed little inclination to give up his power. Junior minister Choe put out a fiery impeachment pointing out the Daewongun's many wicked deeds such as the selling of political offices and positions, the unnecessary using of people's taxes to reconstruct the Gyeongbokgung Palace, the closing of Confucian academies, and his unsuccessful attempts at preventing foreign ships from entering Korea.

Ironically, Choe's ideology was very similar to that of the Daewongun, in that they were both highly anti-foreign. Nevertheless, Choe was severely disappointed with the actions of the Regent, and his political backing by the family of soon-to-be Queen Myeongseong also inspired his impeachment of the Regent.

Daewongun's supporters banished Choe to Jeju Province Island but his initiation allowed others who were discontent to speak out against the Regent, as a result leading to the Daewongun's retirement to Yangju, and Choe was soon reinstated to office by King Gojong.

== Opposition to the Kanghwa Treaty ==
In 1876, King Gojong called his trusted advisers together previous to the signing of the Japan–Korea Treaty of 1876, a treaty which would open the doors of Korea to Japan, for advice. Choe led conservative gentry opposition to the Treaty, declaring that the Treaty would be harmful to the nation, in that it would lead to the influx of Western thought such as Catholicism, and the economic invasion of Korean markets by Japanese goods. As a result of his outspokenness against the Treaty, Choe was taken out of office by the Japanese soon after it was signed.

The signing of the Treaty and his subsequent banishment caused Choe to re-initiate traditional wijeong cheoksa movements among the people to revive Confucian values and cast out western and Japanese ideas.

== Uijong Cheoksa activities ==
From 1876 to 1894, Choe Ik-hyeon along with other conservative Yangban who had studied under Yi Hang-no, initiated anti-Japanese movements across the country with the purpose of ousting anything foreign from the country and reinstating traditional Confucian values. These movements were generally violent as they, Choe included, considered the Japanese as no better than the "western barbarians" for adopting their ways.

== Righteous Army activities ==
After the murder of Queen Min in 1895, Japanese-backed Gabo Reformers forced the King to sign an edict decreeing that all Korean males must cut their topknot. Choe and other Confucian conservative officials were outraged, with Choe himself declaring that he would rather cut off his head before cutting his hair. Choe and his colleagues led armed resistance, known as Righteous Army among the countryside, attacking Japanese soldiers, merchants, and pro-Japanese Koreans known as Chinilpa.

== Choe's call to arms and exile ==
Shortly following the Japan–Korea Treaty of 1905 which made Korea a Protectorate of Japan, then 70-year-old Ch'oe Ikhyon sent a letter to Emperor Gojong (Gojong declares his nation the Korean Empire in 1897 and establish himself as an Emperor) pleading for him to resist the Japanese incursions and shortly thereafter wrote, An Appeal to Arms. Choe's An Appeal To Arms was a declaration written to the Korean people to take up arms against the invasion of the Japanese and to revitalize the spirit of the Righteous Army.

Choe quickly gained 400 supporters and personally fought the Japanese initially in Taein, and later in Sunchang County in 1906. He was soon arrested, however, and was sent to Tsushima Island, where he refused to eat the food given to him by the Japanese and died in exile 3 months later.

== Legacy ==
Choe's efforts in encouraging armed resistance through the Righteous Army Movement would last well until 1911, years after he died, in no small part as a result of his instilling of nationalism and the hatred for Japan in his supporters. His works contained in Myunam Jip, would also be preserved by his disciples despite multiple purges of nationalistic books by Japanese officials.

== See also ==
- Song Si-yeol
- Korean independence movement

== Bibliography ==
- Don, Noh Tae. Korean History: Discovery of Its Characteristics and Developments. Elizabeth: Hollym International Corp., (2004). ISBN 1-56591-177-6
- Kim, Djun Kil. The History of Korea. Westport: Greenwood Press, (2005). ISBN 0-313-33296-7
- Korea, A History of. Roger Tennant. London: Kegan Paul International, (1996). ISBN 071030532X
- Sohn Pow-Key, Kim Chol-choon, Hong Yi-sup. The History of Korea. Seoul: Korean National Commission for Unesco, (1970). ISBN 978-1-111-31526-9 OCLC 146696
- Woo-Keun, Han. The History of Korea. Seoul: The Eul-Yoo Publishing Company, (1970). ISBN 978-89-324-5082-7
- Kim Haboush, JaHyun and Martina Deuchler (1999). Culture and the State in Late Chosŏn Korea. Cambridge: Harvard University Press. ISBN 9780674179820; OCLC 40926015
- Lee, Peter H. (1993). Sourcebook of Korean Civilization, Vol. 1. New York: Columbia University Press. ISBN 9780231079129; ISBN 9780231079143; ISBN 9780231104449; OCLC 26353271
- Noh, Daehwan. "The Eclectic Development of Neo-Confucianism and Statecraft from the 18th to the 19th Century," Korea Journal. Winter 2003.
