= Pak Chiwŏn (philosopher) =

Joseon Dynasty philosopher and writer (1737–1805)

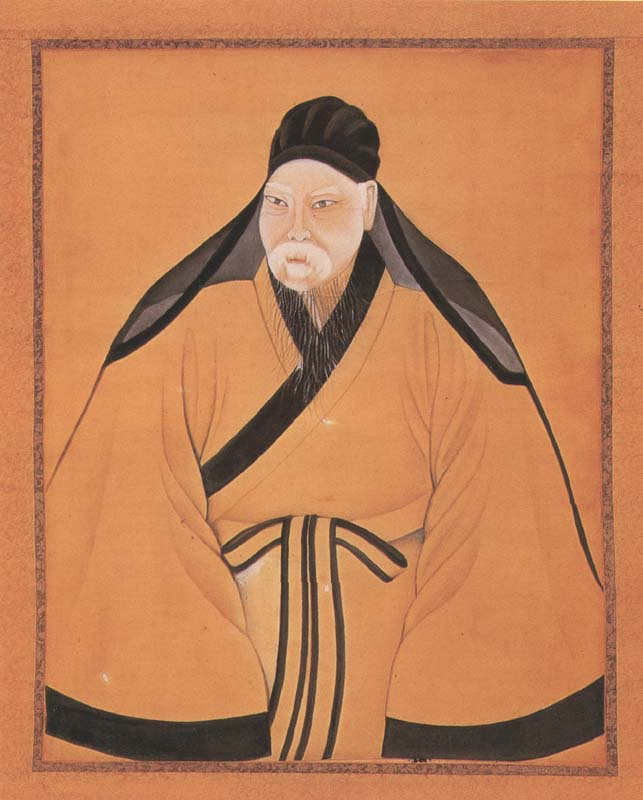
- Born: March 5, 1737; Hanseong, Joseon
- Died: December 10, 1805 (aged 68); Hanseong, Joseon
- Other names: Yŏnam

Philosophical work
- Era: 18th-century philosophy
- Region: Korean Confucianism
- School: Silhak
- Notable works: Collection of the Rock of swallow(Also called Yŏnam chip), The Jehol Diary

- Pak Chiwŏn
- Hangul: 박지원
- Hanja: 朴趾源
- RR: Bak Jiwon
- MR: Pak Chiwŏn

Pak Chiwŏn (Korean: 박지원; Hanja: 朴趾源; 1737–1805), styled Yŏnam (연암; 燕巖; lit. Rock of swallow), was a philosopher and novelist in the late Joseon dynasty. He has been regarded as one of the greatest thinkers of the so-called "Practical Learning (silhak)" movement. Pak Chiwŏn belonged to the "School of Profitable Usage and Benefiting the People" (이용후생파; 利用厚生派; Iyong Husaengp'a) to promote the industrialization of his country and the development of trade by positively introducing western technologies to Joseon Korea. Pak Chiwŏn proposed that Joseon import advanced technologies from the Qing dynasty, and promote mercantilism.

The scholars Pak Chega, Yu Deukgong and Yi Tŏngmu were influenced by Pak Chiwŏn.

== Belief ==
Along with Hong Taeyong, he argued that the ground is not flat but round. He saw that the Earth could be a large circle, not a flat surface. It also claimed that the land consists of one dust and soil. He argued that the world is objectively real, from celestial bodies to all things, and that everything in the universe is created in the process of the particle of dust and movement and change. Pak's claim that the Earth is a round circle was accepted as absurd.

== Personal criticism ==
Pak Chiwŏn's appearance is described in Kwajŏng-rok (過庭錄), written by his son, Pak Chongch'ae. He was tall and very big, had a long face, prominent cheekbones, and a double eyelid. The record is almost identical to the remaining portraits of Pak Chiwŏn. Pak also said that his voice was so loud that he could be heard far outside the fence even if he spoke. Although there was one portrait depicting Pak Chiwŏn as a middle-aged man, Yŏnam forced him to destroy the portrait, saying it was less than 70 percent of his original self, and he never accepted his son's plea to paint it again.

Pak Chiwŏn was also not able to negotiate easily with others. Kim Ki-soon said, "He lacked the power to hold down smoothly because he was so graceful, and he was always too strong to have a smooth side." Pak Chiwŏn also admitted, "It's all because of my personality that I've been through this sort of mess all my life." In fact, Pak entered the government office with a sound letter and served as a minister of internal affairs and internal affairs, but was not included in key posts in the government.

== Books ==
- The Jehol Diary (열하일기)
- Yangban chŏn
- Hŏ saeng chŏn (허생전)
- Yŏnam chip (연암집)

Pak Chiwŏn was also influenced by Chinese writers and technology. He wrote farming manuals with recommendations and was active in practical agronomy. His farming books were Kwonongsocho and Nongjongsinso.

== Popular culture ==
- Portrayed by Jung Yoo-seok in the 2014 tvN TV series The Three Musketeers.
