= Yu Hyeong-won =

Korean scholar-official (1622–1673)

- Korean name
- Hangul: 유형원
- Hanja: 柳馨遠
- RR: Yu Hyeongwon
- MR: Yu Hyŏngwŏn

Art name
- Hangul: 반계
- Hanja: 磻溪
- RR: Bangye
- MR: Pan'gye

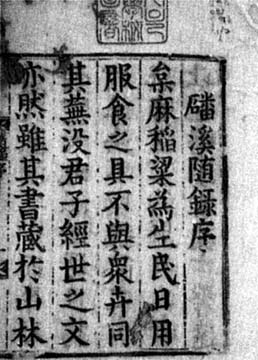
A page from Yu Hyeongwon's Bangye surok

Yu Hyeong-won (Korean: 유형원; 1622–1673), also spelled as Yoo Hyung-Won, was a Korean philosopher. His art name was Ban'gye (磻溪). He was a Neo-Confucianist and science scholar of the Korean Joseon Dynasty. He was a Korean pioneer of the early silhak ("practical learning") school as well as a social critic and scholar of the late Joseon period. He was the disciple of Misu Hŏ Mok and second cousin of the silhak scholar Seongho Yi Ik.

Yu was a member of the Munhwa Yu clan, and many of his extended family members held high official positions in the Joseon government. However, he did not become an official, but led the life of a reclusive scholar. His work, Bangyesurok, became influential during the reign of King Yeongjo, who was made aware of it in 1741 and authorised its printing in 1770.

== Works ==
- Bangyesurock(반계수록 磻溪隧錄)
- Bangyejip(반계집 磻溪集)
- Baekgyungsajam(백경사잠 百警四箴)
- Bangyeilgo(반계일고 磻溪一顧)
- Gunhyunje(군현제 郡縣制)
- Yigichongron(이기총론 理氣總論)
- Nanhakmulli(논학물리 論學物理)
- Gyungsulmundap(경설문답 經說問答)
- Jujachanyo(주자찬요 朱子纂要)
- Yeojiji(여지지 輿地志)
- Gunhyunjije(군현지제 郡縣之制)
- Gihaengilrok(기행일록 紀行日錄)
- Dongguksaksagangmokjorye(동국사강목조례 東國史綱目條例)
- Donggukyuksagibo(동국역사가고 東國歷史可考)
- Sokgangmokuibo(속강목의보 續綱目疑補)
- Dongsaguiseolbyun(동사괴설변 東史怪說辨)
- Mugyungsaseocho(무경사서초 武經四書抄)
- Gihyosinseojulhyo(기효신서절요 紀效新書節要)
- Chungeumjinam(정음지남 正音指南)
- Dojeongchuljip(도정절집 陶靖節集)
- Donggukmuncho(동국문초 東國文抄)
- Jungweowirack(중여위략 中與偉略)

== See also ==
- Yi Sugwang
- Yu Suwon
- Hŏ Mok
- Yun Hyu
- Yi Sŏu
- Yi Ik
- Chŏng Yagyong

== Site Link ==
- Yu Hyungwon
- Découvrez la forteresse de Hwaseong entourant le centre de Suwon en Corée du Sud (in French)
- 1656 – "Yojiji (輿地志)" by Ryu Hyung-won (柳馨遠) didn't say "Usan is so-called Japanese Matsushima."
