= Yi Sugwang =

Korean sarim and politician (1563–1628)

- Hangul: 이수광
- Hanja: 李睟光
- RR: I Sugwang
- MR: I Sugwang

Yi Sugwang (Korean: 이수광; 1563–1628), also known as Lee Soo-kwang, was a Korean sarim, a military official, and a diplomat of the Joseon period. He was also an academic and an encyclopedist who compiled the Jibong Yuseol, the earliest Korean encyclopedia.

== Early life ==
Yi Sugwang was born to a wealthy, aristocratic family in 1563, and was offered the finest education his parents could afford. In 1585, he passed the civil service exam and became a military officer.

== Military career ==
In the wake of Seven-Year War, he was stationed in Jogyeong, Gyeongsang province, where he was given command of a small army contingent. He encountered a Japanese expeditionary contingent in Yongin, Gyeonggi province and lost. His superiors restationed him in Uiju, Hamgyong province, where he encountered more Japanese forces. His actions during this period were sufficiently successful for him to be promoted.

In 1614, he would write about his military experience, noting that the Joseon forces had "too many sajok (families of yangban or scholar officials), idlers, vagrants and too few people liable for service." The book is considered to be the foundation of the Silhak school.

== Career as an emissary ==
After the war, he was dispatched as an emissary to the Ming Dynasty. In Ming China, he acquired several books written on Catholicism by an Italian priest, Matteo Ricci, who was living in China at this time. He brought them back to Korea, which was the first time Western literature had been brought into Korea. He took great interest in the Western world. From the research he developed during his three missions to China, he was able to create a 20-volume encyclopedia, with the title Jibong Yuseol.

The Jibong Yuseol contained not only information on Catholicism and China, but also on Japan, Vietnam, and Thailand. It also contained basic information on the Western world, including the geography and weather of England, western food, and western weapons. He also wrote about the knowledge of astronomy that he had acquired from an Italian priest staying in China at the time. He visited China several times, and even met Thai (known then to Koreans as Seomra people) emissaries in China. Taking a great interest in the Thais, he closely recorded the customs of the Thai people. He also had contact with emissaries from Vietnam and the Okinawan Islands.

== Government official ==
When he came back to Korea, he became the high-ranking government official of Ijo (吏曹, Ministry of Personnel), the Ijo Panseo (이조판서). In his later works - Jibong Jib (지봉집) and Chaesin Jamnok (채신잡록)- he placed less emphasis on Confucianism and emphasized adopting western knowledge to strengthen the nation. His work also dealt with the subject of moderate political and economic reforms to improve the living standards of the peasants, which had deteriorated following the Seven-Year War, and the bureaucracy. He also implemented welfare policies, believing that the Way of Heaven was found among the people and the most noble endeavour was to feed and clothe the poor. His idea of a welfare state was inspired by both Confucianism and Catholicism. These books were stored in Changsu Seowon (Changsu Confucian Academy) in Suwon, Gyeonggi province.

Those whom he is said to have influenced include the early 17th century thinkers, Yu Hyeong-won (1622–1673) and Yun Jeung (尹拯, 1629–1714).

He died in 1628. He was given the posthumous official title Yeonguijeong, the Chief State Councillor of the State Council.

== See also ==
- Jeong Duwon, another ambassador who returned from China with many works on European science, religion, and culture
