= Baengnyeonsa =

Buddhist temple in South Korea

Baengnyeon Temple
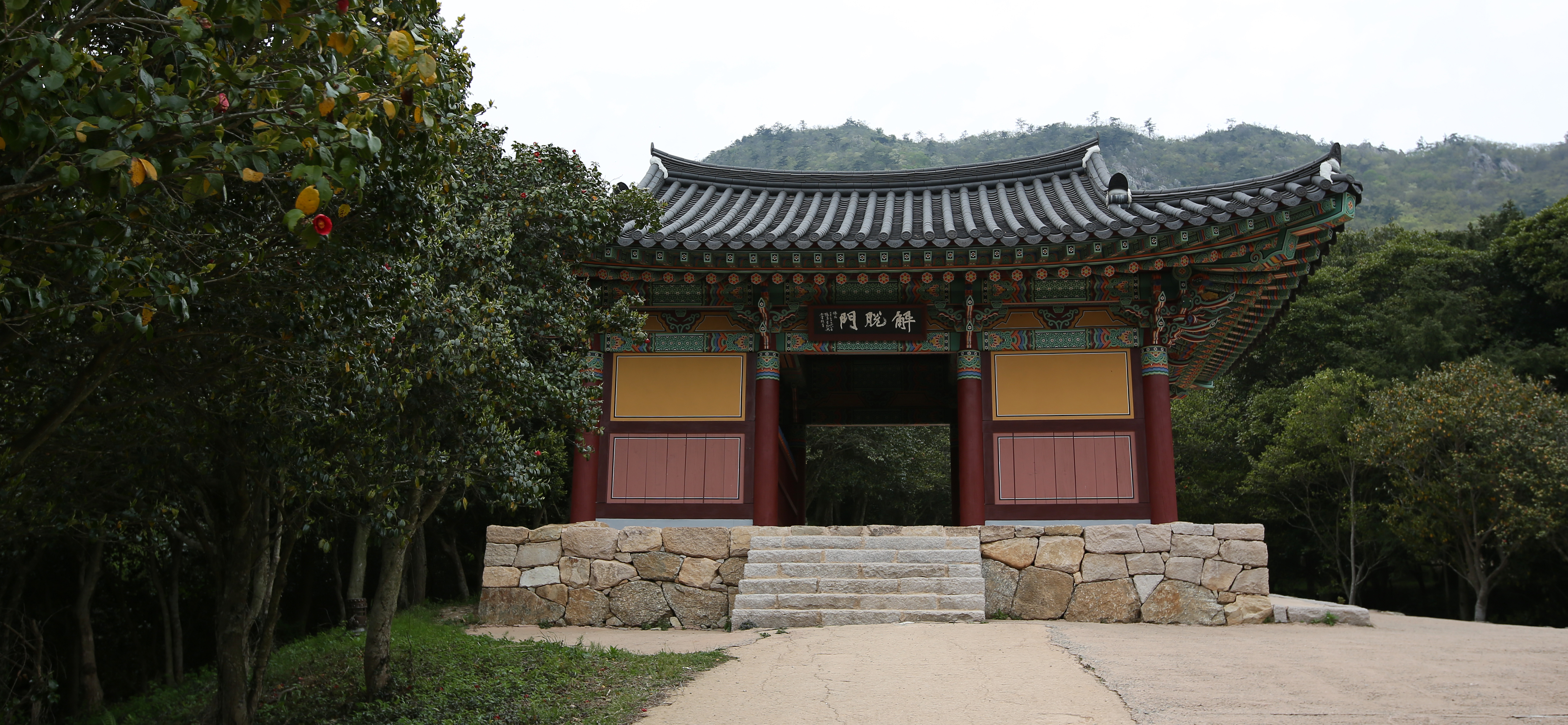
- Baekryeonsa in 2015

- Location within South Korea

Religion
- Affiliation: Buddhism

Location
- Location: Mandeok-ri, Doam-myeon, Gangjin County, South Jeolla Province
- Country: South Korea
- Coordinates: 34.587723°N 126.748208°E

- Baengnyeonsa
- Hangul: 백련사
- Hanja: 白蓮寺
- RR: Baengnyeonsa
- MR: Paengnyŏnsa

Baengnyeon Temple (Korean: 백련사) is a Buddhist temple located in Doam-myeon, Gangjin county, South Jeolla province, South Korea. Its name means 'White Lotus temple'.

This temple is the place where the philosopher Dasan met his mentor, the monk Hyejang during his exile in Gangjin, where he was introduced to Korean tea culture while the monk was introduced to Korean Confucianism. The place where he stayed, now called the Dasan Chodang (다산초당; 茶山艸堂), and the temple is connected by a 1.5 km path. Near the temple is a dense camelia forest that is listed as Natural Monument No. 151, which flowers will blossom every spring.

It was founded by the monk Muyeom [ko] (무염; 無染) in 839 during the United Silla period, initially called Mandeoksa (만덕사; 萬德寺) because it is located in Mandeoksan. In 1170 during the Goryeo dynasty it was restored for the first time, and in 1211 it was greatly rebuilt and expanded by the monk Yose (요세; 了世) in 1211 after he obtained the teachings of the Cheontae order. Around this time he also founded the Baekryeonsa-gyeolsa (백련사결사; 白蓮社結社), meaning 'White Lotus Society', which is shortened to Baekryeonsa, which eventually became the temple name. In the span of 120 years it produced eight guksa [ko] (국사; 國師), the highest rank for Buddhist monks. However, wokou raids on Gangjin had bought destruction to the temple. During the Joseon dynasty, it was restored for the second time under the reign of King Sejong the Great, with great help Grand Prince Hyoryeong, who gave the throne to his younger brother; later, Hyoryeong would live in this temple for eight years. During the reign of King Hyojong, it was reconstructed for the third time, when a pagoda and monument was erected. Currently it belongs to the Jogye Order of Korean Buddhism.

It was designated a Local Tangible Cultural Property in 1986.

== Templestay program ==
Visitors can participate in the Templestay program offered by the temple, where they can experience the tea brewed from the same tea plant that Dasan used.

== See also ==
- Mandeoksan (South Jeolla)
