= Yi Sŭnghun =

Korean Catholic martyr (1756–1801)

- Born: 1756; Hanseong, Joseon
- Died: April 8, 1801 (aged 44–45); Hanseong, Joseon
- Other name: Peter Li
- Known for: Early Korean Catholic convert

Korean name
- Hangul: 이승훈
- Hanja: 李承薰
- RR: I Seunghun
- MR: I Sŭnghun

Yi Sŭnghun (Korean: 이승훈; Hanja: 李承薰; 1756 – April 8, 1801), also Ni-Seoung-Houn and baptized as Peter, was a Korean Catholic missionary known as one of the first Christians, missionaries and martyrs in Korea.

== Biography ==
He was born in 1756 in Hanseong, modern day Seoul. His father was Yi Tonguk (이동욱; 李東郁, 1739-?), art name Soam (소암; 蘇巖), from the Pyeongchang clan, who rose to the rank of champan (vice-minister) and, after possible initial interest, fiercely opposed the spread of Catholic teachings. His mother was a sister of Yi Kahwan (이가환; 李家煥, 1742–1801), one of the Catholics executed with him in 1801.

Yi Sŭnghun first came into contact with Catholicism via Yi Pyŏk in 1779. In 1783–4, he accompanied his father on a diplomatic mission to Beijing, China, and on the suggestion of Yi Pyŏk contacted the Catholic priests there. He was baptised in Beijing by Jean-Baptiste-Joseph de Grammont in the spring of 1784. This was the first time that a member of the Korean yangban class was formally baptised as a Christian and he returned to Korea with books, crucifixes, and other Catholic artifacts. Yi Pyŏk then seems to have taken some time to study the books before declaring himself convinced. He then set about evangelizing those around him, including Kwŏn Ch'ŏlsin and his younger brother Kwŏn Ilsin. This was also the moment when he spoke of the Catholic faith to the brothers Chŏng Yakjong, Chŏng Yakchŏn, and Chŏng Yagyŏng (who recorded the event in his epitaph myojimyeong.

It was only after Yi Pyŏk felt fully convinced that he authorized Yi Sŭnghun to baptise himself and the other converts to Catholicism. Early in 1785 the growing group of believers and sympathizers in Seoul moved their regular gatherings for worship from the house of Yi Pyŏk to that belonging to another convert, Kim Beom-u, on the hill where Myeongdong Cathedral now stands. Almost immediately the authorities raided the house, suspecting it of being a gambling den, and were embarrassed on finding it full of nobles. Yi Sŭnghun was among those named in the official report of the incident. After the death of Yi Pyŏk later that year, Yi Sŭnghun took over his role in the group. In the spring of 1786, as there were yet no formally ordained priests in Korea, Various leading Korean laymen, including Ch'oe Ch'anghyŏn, Yi T'anwŏn, began acting as "temporary clerics". In 1789, however, the Korean Catholics were informed by the bishop in Beijing, Mgr. Gouvea, that such practices were contrary to Church teachings and that they should cease. There would be no ordained priest in Korea until 1795, when the Chinese priest Zhu Wenmiao arrived, at which time the Church had grown to over 4000 members. Yi Sŭnghun and Chŏng Yakjong were the main leaders of the community in Seoul after the death of Yi Pyŏk in 1786. Yi Sŭnghun's wife was Chŏng Yakjong's sister.

In 1801, the Korean Catholic Church was subject to the first major repression by the government (the Sinyu Persecution) in which more than 300 people were killed. Yi was martyred by beheading on the 26th of the 2nd lunar month (April 8), 1801. This incident has come to be known as the Catholic Persecution of 1801. Little written material remains from this period but a collection of texts by several of the first believers, known as Manch'ŏn yugo (蔓川遺稿), was discovered in about 1970. Manch'ŏn was the art name of Yi Sŭnghun, whose writings occupy a major part of the book, together with texts written by Yi Pyŏk etc. It is not known when or by whom the collection was made, and although it is sometimes claimed to be in the handwriting of Chŏng Yagyong, this does not seem to be the case.

== See also ==
- Roman Catholicism in South Korea
- Korean Martyrs
- Seohak
