= Catholic Persecution of 1801 =

Mass persecution of Korean Catholics

- Sinyu Persecution
- Hangul: 신유박해
- Hanja: 辛酉迫害
- Revised Romanization: Sinyu Bakhae
- McCune–Reischauer: Sinyu Pakhae

"Sinyu Cult Inquisition"
- Hangul: 신유사옥
- Hanja: 辛酉邪獄
- Revised Romanization: Sinyu Saok
- McCune–Reischauer: Sinyu Saok

The Catholic Persecution of 1801, also known as the Sinyu Persecution (신유박해), was a mass persecution of Korean Catholics ordered by Queen Jeongsun during King Sunjo of Joseon's reign. The government began to suppress Catholicism in the belief that it conflicted with the tenets of Confucianism.

== Background ==
Catholicism came to Korea by way of books written by Jesuit missionaries in China. Korean scholars would read these Chinese language texts, obtained through contacts with Beijing. While most rejected the ideas expressed, a few were intrigued. One particular group, the Namin, or Southerners, viewed Catholic ideas about moral development as a field of study. Namin scholars in Gwangju were open to other schools of thought and "studied Catholicism, hoping it could supplement loopholes in the Neo-Confucianist policies that were used to rule the country".

While traffic with foreigners and their ideas was frowned upon, King Jeongjo of Joseon, who ruled from 1776 to 1800, needed the support of the Namin, and limited anti-Catholic activity to burning Catholic books and promoting Neo-Confucianism.

== History ==
Factionalism and court politics were often closely related to the breakout of violence against Catholics. King Jeongjo died in 1800 and was succeeded by his ten-year-old son, Sunjo of Joseon. The Grand Queen Dowager, Queen Jeongsun, as the most senior member of the royal family, served as regent for her step great-grandson. In order to strengthen her position, she allied with the Noron faction, which viewed the spread of Catholicism as a threat. Oppression of Roman Catholicism then began in earnest. Beginning on April 8, 1801, the move was a cover for the political persecution of factions within the government which were opposing her, and were less hostile to Catholicism.

Francis Yun Ji-heon was killed and dismembered. He was the brother of Paul Yun Ji-chung, who, with James Kwon Sang-yeon, was executed in 1791 for destroying mortuary tablets used in traditional Korean funeral rites and holding a Catholic service instead. The remains of all three were discovered in 2021 at the Chonami Shrine in Wanju County, while it was undergoing maintenance work. Another victim of the persecutions was Yi Seung-hun.

== Hwang Sayŏng's incident ==
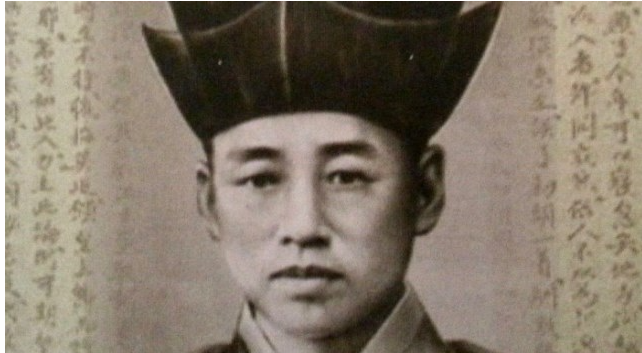
Hwang Sayŏng

Hwang Sayŏng, a persecuted Catholic and nephew-in-law of renowned scholar Chŏng Yagyong, attempted to send correspondence to Catholic priests in Beijing detailing the persecution and pleading with the Qing dynasty to intervene on behalf of Catholics in Joseon, with Western ships if necessary. The letter was intercepted en route, and Hwang was executed on December 10 (the 5th of 11th lunar month) for treason.

By the end of the persecution several hundred Catholics had been executed. However, new leaders emerged and rebuilt the community.

== In popular culture ==
- The Book of Fish, 2021 film has reference to the persecution incident.

== See also ==
- Korean Martyrs
- Christianity in Korea
- Seohak

== Sources ==
- The Founding of Catholic Tradition in Korea, ed. by Chai-Shin Yu (Mississauga: Korean and Related Studies Press, 1996). ISBN 0-9681072-2-2
- Jai-Keun Choi, The Origin of the Roman Catholic Church in Korea: An Examination of Popular and Governmental Responses Catholic Missions in the Late Chosôn Dynasty (Cheltenham, PA: Hermit Kingdom Press, 2006). ISBN 1-59689-064-9
