= Sarye p'yŏllam =

18th-century text on Korean rites

- Hangul: 사례편람
- Hanja: 四禮便覽
- RR: Sarye pyeollam
- MR: Sarye p'yŏllam

Sarye p'yŏllam (Korean: 사례편람; Hanja: 四禮便覽) is a record of Neo-Confucian rites and ceremonies written by the Korean scholar Yi Jae (李縡 1680–1746) of the Joseon Dynasty. The title is translated into "Easy Manual of the Four Rites" or "Convenient Reference to the Four Rites". It consists of 8 volumes in 4 books and was published in 1844 by his descendant, Yi Gwang-jeong (李光正).

== See also ==
- An Hyang
- Korean Confucianism
- Dangui
