= Seohak =

Western ideas in Joseon Korea

- Hangul: 서학
- Hanja: 西學
- Revised Romanization: Seohak
- McCune–Reischauer: Sŏhak

Seohak was the introduction of technology, philosophy and most prominently, Catholicism and Western ideas to Joseon Korea in the 18th century. It is also occasionally referred to as Cheonjuhak (Korean: 천주학; Hanja: 天主學; MR: Ch'ŏnjuhak) which means 'Heavenly Learning'. Literally meaning "Western learning", Seohak's antonym was Donghak (동학; 東學; lit. '"Eastern learning"'), which featured neo-Confucianism and other traditional ways of thought.

== History ==
Catholicism entered Korea indirectly in the 18th century via limited transmission of royal messengers carrying books from missionaries in Qing China. In this way, Seohak slowly entered Korea in the form of foreign books translated into Classical Chinese. This is unique in that Catholicism originally spread without the direct influence of missionaries in Korea. Although, eventually foreign missionaries entered Korea in 1836.

Seohak was seen as a western philosophy, instead of a religion, which embraced new technology. This movement was initially accepted only by a minority of progressive thinkers and even fewer people were ready to accept the Catholic aspect of Seohak.

Allegedly, in 1784 after Yi Seung-hun was baptized in Beijing, he came to Seoul and baptized Yi Byuk in the personal home of Kim Pom-u at the present site of Myeongdong Cathedral. In the spring of 1785, this location was the site of an arrest for holding a religious meeting. Although Yi Sung-hun would be released, Kim Pom-u would later be remembered as the first Catholic martyr in Korea after his initial exile and subsequent execution.

== Controversy ==
Many of the Korean elite saw Seohak as a modified form of Buddhism which threatened the social order of the time. Furthermore, the literal reading of the Western religious texts seemed to promote an idea of social equality which challenged the established order at the time. Silhak, a home-grown reform movement, was preferred.

In Korea at the time only elites could read - thus the Seohak-Silhak face-off was an intra-elite disagreement.

In addition, many Korean Catholics refused to do ancestor worship due to religious conflicts. This eventually led to the Catholic Persecution of 1801.

== See also ==
- Catholic Church in South Korea
- Korean Martyrs
- Matteo Ricci
- Rangaku
- Catholic Persecution of 1801
