= Chŏng Yagyong =

Korean scholar-official (1762–1836)

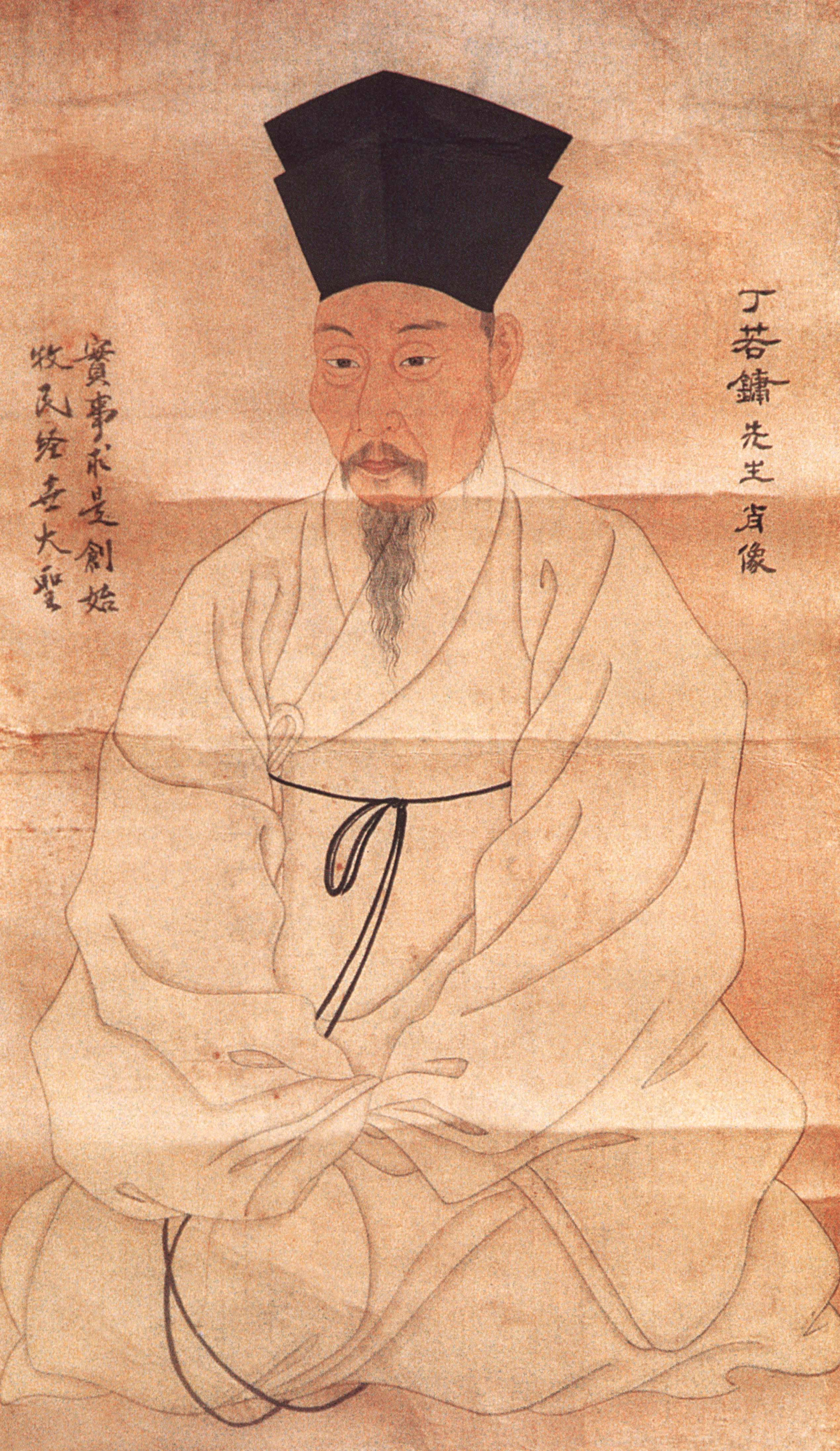

Korean name
- Hangul: 정약용
- Hanja: 丁若鏞
- RR: Jeong Yakyong
- MR: Chŏng Yagyong

Art name
- Hangul: 다산
- Hanja: 茶山
- RR: Dasan
- MR: Tasan

Courtesy name
- Hangul: 미용, 송보
- Hanja: 美鏞, 頌甫
- RR: Miyong, Songbo
- MR: Miyong, Songbo

Posthumous name
- Hangul: 문도
- Hanja: 文度
- RR: Mundo
- MR: Mundo

Childhood name
- Hangul: 귀농
- Hanja: 歸農
- RR: Gwinong
- MR: Kwinong

Chŏng Yagyong (Korean: 정약용; Hanja: 丁若鏞; 1762 – 1836) was a Korean agronomist, philosopher, and poet. He is also known by his art name Tasan (다산; 茶山; lit. 'tea mountain'). He was one of the greatest thinkers in the later Joseon period, wrote highly influential books about philosophy, science and theories of government, held significant administrative positions, and was noted as a poet. He was a close confidant of King Jeongjo and his philosophical position is often identified with the Silhak school, and his concerns are better seen as explorations of neo-Confucian themes.

Chŏng was born in Namyangju (then Gwangju), Gyeonggi Province, where he also died. He spent 18 years in exile in Gangjin County, South Jeolla Province, from 1801 until 1818, on account of his membership of the Southerners faction, and also because of his and his older brother's Catholic faith. Chŏng and his brother Yakchŏn were baptized and became Catholics in 1874, with Chŏng taking the Christian name of John.

Chŏng Yagyong came from the Naju Chŏng clan. At birth he was given the childhood name, Kwinong (歸農), and later he was also known by the courtesy names Miyong (美鏞) and Songbu (頌甫)美庸); among his art names were Saam (俟菴), T'agong (籜翁), T'aesu (苔叟), Chahadoin (紫霞道人), Ch'ŏlmasanin (鐵馬山人), Tasan (茶山), Yŏyudang (與猶堂, the name of his house).

== Biography ==
=== Family history ===
Tasan's father was Chŏng Chaewŏn (정재원; 丁載遠, 1730–1792). His eldest brother, Chŏng Yakhyŏn (정약현; 丁若鉉, 1751–1821), was the son of a first wife, while Chŏng Yakchong, Chŏng Yakchŏn (정약전; 丁若銓, 1758–1816), and Chŏng Yagyong were the sons of their father's second wife, Yun So'on (윤소온; 尹小溫, 1728–1770) from the Haenam Yun family. There was one daughter from this second marriage.

Tasan's father's family traced their descent back to Chŏng Chagŭp (정자급; 丁子伋, 1423–1487) who in 1460 first took a government position under King Sejo. Eight further generations then followed his example. Chŏng Siyun (정시윤; 丁時潤, 1646–1713) and his second son Chŏng Tobok (정도복; 丁道復, 1666–1720) were the last of the line, since the Southerners' faction to which the family belonged lost power in 1694. Siyun retired to a house in Mahyeon-ri to the east of Seoul (now known as Namyangju) in 1699, which was to be Tasan's birthplace. His eldest son, Chŏng Tot'ae (정도태; 丁道泰) lived there and was Tasan's direct ancestor. The Southerners remained excluded from official positions until a brief period that began during the reign of King Jeongjo, when Tasan's father was appointed magistrate of Jinju county, thanks to his strong links with the powerful Ch'ae Chegong, who rose until he was appointed third state councillor in 1788. In 1762, the execution of Crown Prince Sado by his father the king shocked Chŏng Chaewŏn that he withdrew from official life and returned to his home in Mahyeon-ri. This explains the childhood name Kwi'nong ("back to farming") his father gave Tasan, who was born in the same year. As a result, Tasan grew up receiving intense intellectual training from his now unoccupied father.

The source of Tasan's intellectual interests can be traced to the influence of the great scholar Udam Chŏng Sihan (우담 정시한; 愚潭 丁時翰, 1625–1707) of the same clan, who taught Chŏng Siyun briefly and was then the main teacher of Tasan's ancestor Chŏng Tot'ae as well as his brother Chŏng Toje (1675–1729). One of the most significant thinkers in the next generation was the philosopher-scholar Sŏngho Yi Ik and he saw Udam as the authentic heir of Toegye Yi Hwang. Chŏng Toje transmitted the teachings of Udam to the next generations of the family and so they were passed to Tasan's father and Tasan himself.

Similarly, Tasan's mother was descended from the family of the famous Southerner scholar-poet Kosan Yun Sŏndo (1587–1671). Yun's great-grandson Kongjae Yun Tusŏ (1668–1715), well known for his skills as a painter, was Tasan's maternal great-grandfather. He and his elder brother were close to Yi Ik and his brothers, and are credited with reviving the study of the Six Classics, as well as the thought of Toegye.

=== Early life ===
By the age of 6, Tasan's father was impressed by his powers of observation. By the age of 9, he had composed a small collection of poems. In 1776, Tasan was married to Hong Hwabo of the Pungsan Hong clan, the daughter of a royal secretary; in that year he moved to Seoul, where his father received an appointment in the Board of Taxation after the accession of King Jeongjo. When he was 15, Tasan was introduced to the writings of Yi Ik by one of his descendants, Yi Kahwan (이가환; 李家煥, 1742–1801) and his brother-in-law Yi Seung-hun and he was deeply impressed, resolving to devote his life to similar studies. In 1783, Tasan passed the chinsagwa (literary licentiate examination), which allowed him to enter the Sungkyunkwan.

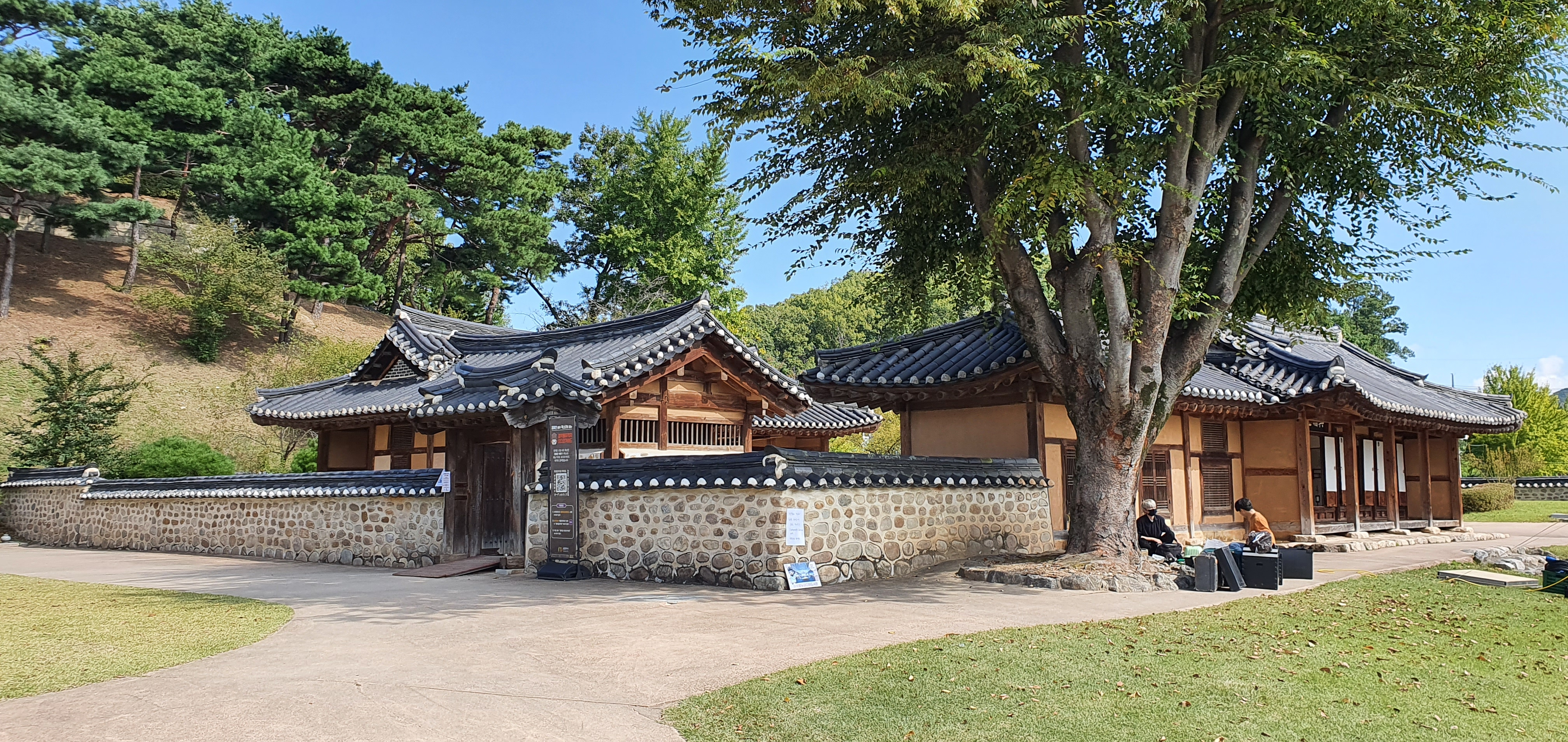
The exterior of Chŏng Yagyong's birthplace

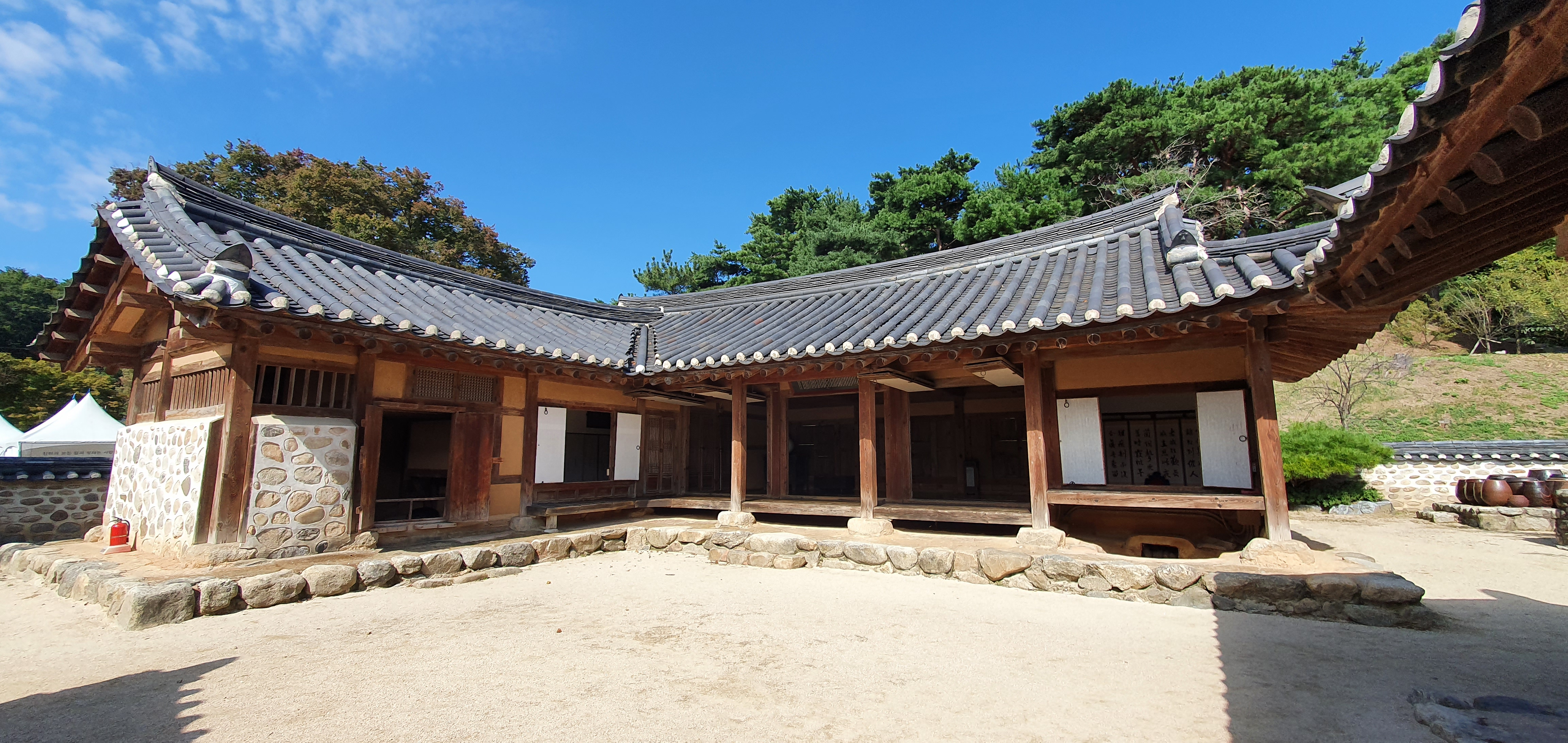
The interior of Chŏng Yagyong's birthplace

In 1784 the king was deeply impressed by the "objectivity" of Tasan's replies to a set of questions he had formulated. This was the start of an increasingly close relationship between the king and Tasan. After the promotion of Ch'ae Chegong in 1788, Tasan took top place in the taegwa (higher civil service exam) in 1789 and was offered a position in the Office of Royal Decrees, together with 5 other members of the Southerner faction. This alarmed members of the opposing Old Doctrine faction, who soon realized the extent to which the Southerners were being influenced, not only by the Practical Learning introduced to China from Europe, but by Roman Catholicism itself.

In 1784, Yi Byeok, a scholar who had participated in meetings to study books about the Western (European) Learning, starting in 1777, talked with Tasan about the new religion for the first time and gave him a book about it. Whatever his own response may have been, and there is no proof that he ever received baptism, Tasan's immediate family was deeply involved in the origins of the Korean Catholic community. His older sister was married to Yi Seung-hun, the Korean who was first baptized as a Catholic in Beijing in 1784 and played a leading role in the early years of the Church's growth. The oldest of Chŏng Chaewŏn's sons, Yakhyŏn, was married to a sister of Yi Byeok. Another daughter, from a third marriage, later married Hwang Sayŏng (1775–1801), author of the notorious Silk Letter. Tasan's older brother, Chŏng Yakchong (Augustinus) was the leader of the first Catholic community and one of the first victims of the purge launched against Southerners, but especially against Catholics, in 1801, after the sudden death of King Jeongjo.

In 1789, Yun Chich'ung, one of the first baptized and a cousin to Tasan on his mother's side, had gone to Beijing and received confirmation. Rome had forbidden Catholics to perform ancestral rituals and this was now being strictly applied by the Portuguese Franciscan bishop of Beijing Alexandre de Gouvea. When his mother died in 1791, Yun therefore refused to perform the usual Confucian ceremonies; this became public knowledge, he was accused of impiety and was executed. Some Koreans who had at first been sympathetic, horrified by the Church's rejection of hallowed traditions, turned away. Chŏng Yagyong may well have been among them.

=== Royal service ===
Tasan was particularly interested in civil engineering. In 1792, the king, impressed by a pontoon bridge he had designed, asked him to design and supervise the construction of the walls for the Hwaseong Fortress (modern Suwon), which surrounded the palace where the king would live when he visited the new tomb he had constructed for his father. Tasan produced radically new techniques and structures, drawing on European, Chinese and Japanese sources. In 1794, after several promotions, the king appointed him as secret envoy to Gyeonggi province, investigating reports of corruption.

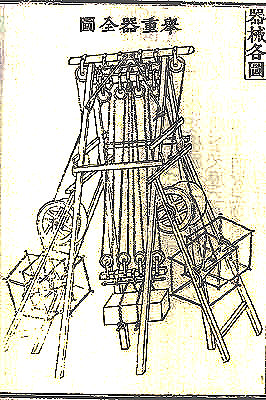
Leverage mechanics invented by Chŏng Yagyong to assist in the construction of the Hwaseong Fortress

Tasan's most important task in 1795, the 60th anniversary of the birth of Crown Prince Sado, was to help the king decide on a new honorary title for his father. This was a fraught enterprise, the Prince's supporters were members of what was called the Expediency subfaction while his main enemies were members of the Principle subfaction. The Southerners were strong supporters of the king's wish to honor Sado highly and the king was more than grateful. However, he then found it prudent to send Tasan away from court for a time, appointing him to be superintendent of the post station at Geumjeong, South Pyeongan province.

In 1796, he was brought back to Seoul and promoted but his many enemies continued to accuse him of supporting the pro-western Catholics and he preferred to take up a position as county magistrate at Koksan in Hwanghae Province.

In 1799, he even withdrew to his family home but was summoned back to Seoul by the king in 1800.

=== Exile ===
In the summer of 1800, King Jeongjo died suddenly. The new king, King Sunjo, was still only an 11 year old child and power fell into the hands of the widow of King Yeongjo, often known as Queen Dowager Kim or Queen Jeongsun. Her family belonged to the factions opposed to the reformist, often Catholic, Namin group and she had been powerless during Jeongjo's reign. She launched an attack on the Catholics, who were denounced as traitors and enemies of the state. Chŏng Yakchong, the older brother of Chŏng Yagyong, was the head of the Catholic community, and was one of the first to be arrested and executed, together with Yi Seung-hun, in the spring of 1801. His eldest son, Chŏng Ch'ŏlsang (정철상; 丁哲祥), was executed a month later.

As Chŏng Yakchong's younger brother, Chŏng Yagyong was exiled for some months in Janggi fortress in what is now Pohang. However the Silk Letter Incident of 1801 ensured his further exile: Hwang Sayŏng, married to one of Tasan's younger sisters, had written a letter to the bishop of Beijing, giving a detailed account of the persecutions, and asking him to bring pressure on the Korean authorities by asking for Western nations to send warships and troops to overthrow the Joseon government so that Korea would be subject to China, where Catholicism was permitted. The carrier of this letter (written on a roll of silk wrapped round his body) was caught and its contents ensured the continuing persecution of Catholics.

The persecution intensified and Chŏng Yagyong and his younger brother, Chŏng Yakjŏn were exiled, parting ways at Naju, from where Chŏng Yakchŏn journeyed on to the island of Heuksando, Yagyong taking the road to Gangjin where he spent eighteen years in exile. His exile began in the last days of 1801, on December 28. On that day, he arrived in Gangjin, South Jeolla Province. The newly arrived exile had little or no money and no friends, he found shelter in the back room of a poor, rundown tavern kept by a widow, outside the East Gate of the walled township of Gangjin, and there he lived until 1805. He called his room "Sauijae" (room of four obligations: clear thinking, serious appearance, quiet talking, sincere actions).

By 1805 Dowager Queen Kim had died and the young king had come of age and had put an end to the violence against Catholics. Three hundred had been killed and many of the rest were exiled or scattered, or had stopped practising. Chŏng Yagyong was free to move about the Gangjin area and in the spring of 1805 he walked up the hill as far as Baengnyeonsa, where he met the Venerable Hyejang, the newly arrived monk in charge of the temple, who was about ten years younger than himself. They talked and it seems that Hyejang only realized who his visitor was as he was leaving. That night he forced him to stay with him and asked to learn the I Ching from him. They quickly became close companions.

Later the same year, Hyejang enabled Tasan to move out of the tavern and for nearly a year he lived in Boeun Sanbang, a small hermitage at the nearby temple Goseongsa, which was under Hyejang's control. Finally, in the spring of 1808 he was able to take up residence in a house belonging to a distant relative of his mother, on the slopes of a hill overlooking Gangjin and its bay. It was a simple house, with a thatched roof, but it was there that he spent the remaining ten years of his exile, until the autumn of 1818. This is the site now known as "Tasan Chodang." The hill behind the house was known locally as Tasan (tea-mountain) and that became the name by which he is best known today. Here he taught students who lodged in a building close to his, forming a close-knit community, and he wrote. In his study he accumulated a library of over a thousand books.

During his exile he is said to have written 500 volumes. This needs qualifying, since one "work" might fill nearly 50 volumes of the standard size, but he certainly wrote a vast quantity, some 14,000 pages, mainly in order to set out clearly a fundamental reform program for governing the country correctly according to Confucian ideals. During the years of exile he concentrated first on the Book of Changes (Yi Ching), writing in 1805 the Chuyeoksajeon. A reflection on the Classic of Poetry followed in 1809. He wrote on politics, ethics, economy, natural sciences, medicine and music. After his return from exile, Tasan published his most important works: on jurisprudence Heumheumsinseo (1819); on linguistics Aeongakbi (1819); on diplomacy Sadekoryesanbo (1820); on the art of governing Mongminsimseo and on administration Gyeongsesiryeong (1822).

Tasan remained in exile in Gangjin until 1818, when he was allowed to return to his family home near Seoul. Attempts to bring him back into government service were blocked by factional politics. He used Yeoyudang as his final pen-name: it was the name of the family home where he lived quietly, near the Han River, until he died in 1836, on his sixtieth wedding anniversary. The main sources for his biography are the two versions of his own epitaph, Jachan myojimyeong, and a chronological biography Saam seonsaeng yeonbo composed by his great-grandson Chŏng Kyuyŏng using no longer extant records.

== Tasan and the 19th-century tea revival ==
Chŏng Yagyong had been living in Gangjin for several years when the Venerable Hyejang arrived from the temple Daeheungsa to take charge of Paengnyeonsa. During those years, spent in a poor inn with very little money, Tasan's health had suffered from the low nutritional value of his food. He suffered from chronic digestive problems. Tasan and Hyejang first met on the 17th day of the 4th month, 1805, not long after Hyejang's arrival. Only a few days after, Tasan sent a poem to Hyejang requesting some tea leaves from the hill above the temple; it is dated in the 4th month of 1805, very soon after their meeting.

This poem makes it clear that Tasan already knew the medicinal value of tea and implies that he knew how to prepare the leaves for drinking. It has often been claimed that Tasan learned about tea from Hyejang but this and a series of other poems exchanged between them suggests that in fact Hyejang and other monks in the region learned how to make a kind of caked tea from Tasan.

This would make him the main origin of the ensuing spread of interest in tea. In 1809, the Venerable Cho-ui from the same Daeheungsa temple came to visit Tasan in Gangjin and spent a number of months studying with him there. Again, it seems more than likely that Choui first learned about tea from Tasan, and adopted his very specific, rather archaic way of preparing caked tea. After that, it was the Venerable Choui who, during his visit to Seoul in 1830, shared his tea with a number of scholars. Among them, some poems were written and shared to celebrate the newly discovered drink, in particular the Preface and Poem of Southern Tea (남차병서; 南茶幷序) by Kŭmryŏng Pak Yŏngbo (금령 박영보; 錦舲 朴永輔).

After this, Choui became especially close to Chusa Kim Chŏnghŭi, who visited him several times bringing him gifts of tea during his exile in Jeju Island in the 1740s. A letter about Tasan's method of making caked tea has survived, dated 1830, that Tasan sent to Yi Sihŏn (이시헌; 李時憲; 1803–1860), the youngest pupil taught by him during his 18 years of exile in Gangjin: "It is essential to steam the picked leaves three times and dry them three times, before grinding them very finely. Next that should be thoroughly mixed with water from a rocky spring and pounded like clay into a dense paste that is shaped into small cakes. Only then is it good to drink."

== Thought ==
Chŏng is best known for his work synthesizing neo-Confucianism during the middle Joseon period. In the process, he wrote widely across various fields, including law, political theory, and the Korean Confucian classics. He sought to return Korean Confucian scholarship to a direct connection with the original thought of Confucius. He called this return to the classics "Susa" learning (수사; 洙泗), a reference to the two rivers that flowed through Confucius's homeland.

Chŏng published a number of books across various topics, including his best-known Mokmin simsŏ (목민심서; 牧民心書; lit. 'Admonitions on Governing the People'). He believed, as a good Confucian, that the government should play a major role in solving the problem of poverty. In doing so, he stressed the importance of local magistrates acting with integrity and fairness.

In the service of this idea, Chŏng criticized the philosophers of his time for engaging in both fruitless etymological scholarship and pursuing philosophical theory for their own sake. He argued that scholarship should be refocused on more important concerns such as music, ritual, and law. This was not only an intellectual but also a political assertion: he argued that the gwageo examinations by which people qualified for royal service should be reformed to focus on these concerns.

=== Ye philosophy ===
Ye philosophy takes up a large portion of the writings of Chŏng. As demonstrated by the fact that the original title of Kyŏngse yup'yo (경세유표; 經世遺表; lit. 'A Design for Good Government'), a flagship work of his which presents a blueprint of state management, was Pangnye ch'obon (방례초본; 邦禮草本; lit. 'Draft for the Country's Rites'), Chŏng uses the concept of Ye extensively to represent what he aims to achieve with his thought. He focuses this concept on his notion of good government and later extended and branched into his works of classical studies and natural sciences.

=== Theory of sacrificial rites ===
Tasan's theory of Korean-style sacrificial rites shows his socio-political concern, seeking the rule of virtue and righteous government. He intended to motivate people to make everyday practices of the human imperatives and to revitalize effectively the traditional society of the late period of the Joseon dynasty, which had its basis upon Ye (禮, '[Confucian] order'). In Mokmin simsŏ, Tasan formulated the cognitive process of ritual practice focusing on sacrificial rites as follows.

1. The cognition of the ritual object raises the intentional movement of mind/heart toward the ritual object in the cognitive process.
2. The intentionality of mind and heart entails reverence and purification in the ritual process. Ritual practice is significant through sincerity (성; 誠) and seriousness (경; 敬). From the perspective of the cognitive science of religion, Tasan's theory relates cognition to intentional piety within the cognitive process and combines intentional piety with reverence/purification in ritual practice. Tasan intended to regulate the excessive ritual practices of the literati and restrict popular licentious cults (음사; 淫祀) in accordance with his cognitive formula. From his point of view, Confucian ritual conceptions were improper or impractical, and popular licentious cults were impious and overly enthusiastic. To solve these problems, he redefined Zhu Xi's concept of seriousness as attentive concentration of convergent piety, and recast it as the concept of prudential reverence as intentional pietism. Zhu Xi's concept of seriousness contains apophatic mysticism like Zen Buddhist quietism (정; 靜) by mediation, but Tasan's concept of reverence is inclined towards cataphatic activism by contemplation.

=== Land reform ===
Land reform was an important issue for the Silhak reformers, and Tasan elaborated upon Yu Hyeong-won's land reform proposals. Rather than central state ownership, Tasan proposed a "village land system," in which the village would hold its land in common and farm the land as a whole, while the products of the land would be divided based on the amount of labor contributed.

== Views on Tasan ==
Professor Ogawa Haruhisa of Nishogakusha University in Tokyo is very impressed by Tasan:

"In addition to egalitarian ideas, Chông Yag-yong Tasan provided something precious that had been lost at that time. He has these elements that we must learn and revive in these modern times. He formed his philosophy despite his sufferings in exile. I think he will be of interest to contemporary scholars for a long time."

Professor Peng Lin at Qinghua University, Beijing teaches the Chinese classics and has a special interest in Tasan's study of rituals. He published in the 1980s research papers on Tasan in the Sônggyun'gwan Journal of East Asian Studies:

"Tasan devoted great efforts in studying rites, to understanding and bringing recognition to traditional culture. I believe that Tasan's study of rites is highly unique. He studied all the three fields in the study of ritual and this was not common even among Chinese scholars. Many can achieve only partial understanding even after a lifetime study, but Tasan studied all the ritual fields and his research is truly astounding. He wanted to create an ideal society by starting with what already existed. This shows Tasan's humanistic interest and that intrigues me."

Professor Don Baker at the Asia Center of the University of British Columbia, Canada, is interested in Tasan for his role as an intellectual in a period of transition:

"I think that in the twenty-first century we still need to adopt Tasan's spirit, what I call moral pragmatism. He was a very pragmatic man. He looked at problems and said 'how can we solve them.' But also he always kept his moral values at the front. We often have in society a material progress for the sake of material progress. Tasan wanted a material progress but a progress that creates a more moral society, therefore I call it moral pragmatism and I think that we still need such spirit today."

== Family ==
- Father: Chŏng Chaewŏn (정재원; 丁載遠; 1730–1792)
- Mother: Yun Soon, Lady Yun of the Haenam Yun clan (윤소온, 尹小溫, 해남 윤씨; 1728–1770); daughter of Yun Tŏngnyŏl (윤덕렬; 尹德烈).
    - Older brother: Chŏng Yakchŏn (정약전, 丁若銓; 1758–1816)
    - Older brother: Chŏng Yakchong (1760–1801)
    - Older sister: Lady Chŏng (정씨)
    - Older sister: Lady Chŏng (정씨)
    - Older sister: Lady Chŏng (부인 정씨)
- Wives and children:
  - Lady Hong of the Pungsan Hong clan (부인 풍산 홍씨; 1761–1839)
    - Unnamed daughter (miscarriage in July 1781 after four days from her birth)
    - Son: Chŏng Hagyŏn (정학연, 丁學淵; 1783–1859); childhood name was "Mujang" (무장; 武䍧) and "Mua" (무아; 武兒)
    - Son: Chŏng Hagyu (정학유, 丁學游; 1786–1855); childhood name was "Munjang" (문장; 文䍧) and "Muna" (문아; 文兒)
    - Unnamed son (1789–1791); childhood name was "Kujang" (구장; 懼䍧) and "Kuak" (구악; 懼岳)
    - Unnamed daughter (1792–1794); childhood name was "Hyosun" (효순; 孝順) and "Hodong" (호동; 好童)
    - Daughter: Lady Chŏng (정씨; b. 1793)
    - Unnamed son (1796–1798); childhood name was "Samdong" (삼동; 三童)
    - Unnamed son (1798–1798)
    - Unnamed son (1799–1802); childhood name was "Nongjang" (농장; 農䍧) and "Nonga" (농아; 農兒)
  - Concubine Namdangne (첩 남당네); unnamed woman from the seaside village of Namdang, who lived with him in Tea Mountain (Tasan) where he was exiled
    - Daughter: Chŏng Hongim (홍임)

== See also ==
- Hwaseong Fortress
- Jeongjo of Joseon
- Chŏng Yakchong
- Korean Confucianism
- Korean philosophy
- Silhak
- Roman Catholicism in South Korea
