= Chŏng Yakchong =

Korean Roman Catholic martyr

Blessed Chŏng Yakchong

Martyr
- Born: 1760; Gwangju, Gyeonggi Province, Joseon
- Died: April 8, 1801 (aged 41); Souimun, Hansŏng, Joseon
- Venerated in: Roman Catholicism
- Beatified: August 16, 2014, Seoul, South Korea by Pope Francis
- Feast: September 20

Korean name
- Hangul: 정약종
- Hanja: 丁若鍾
- RR: Jeong Yakjong
- MR: Chŏng Yakchong

Baptismal name
- Hangul: 아우구스티노
- RR: Auguseutino
- MR: Augusŭt'ino

Chŏng Yakchong (Korean: 정약종; Hanja: 丁若鍾; 1760 – April 8, 1801), also known as Augustine Chong, was a Korean Catholic martyr who contributed greatly to the spread of Catholicism in Korea. He was the older brother of Chŏng Yagyong and the father of Paul Chong Hasang.

He wrote the first Catholic catechism using only Korean letters so that he could reach out to the common people as well as the nobles who were the only ones in Korean society who could read Chinese characters. He was first converted to Catholicism himself by the Chinese priest Chou Wen-Mu.
