= Silhak =

Social reform movement in Joseon

- Hangul: 실학
- Hanja: 實學
- RR: Silhak
- MR: Sirhak

Silhak (Korean: 실학; Hanja: 實學) was a Korean Confucian social reform movement in the late Joseon Dynasty. Sil means "actual" or "practical", and hak means "studies" or "learning". It developed in response to the increasingly metaphysical nature of Neo-Confucianism (성리학) that seemed disconnected from the rapid agricultural, industrial, and political changes occurring in Korea between the late 17th and early 19th centuries. Silhak was designed to counter the "uncritical" following of Confucian teachings and the strict adherence to "formalism" and "ritual" by neo-Confucians. Most of the Silhak scholars were from factions excluded from power and other disaffected scholars calling for reform. They advocated an empirical Confucianism deeply concerned with human society at the practical level.

Its proponents generally argued for reforming the rigid Confucian social structure, land reforms to relieve the plight of peasant farmers, promoting Korea's own national identity and culture, encouraging the study of science, and advocating technology exchange with foreign countries. Silhak scholars wanted to use realistic and experimental approaches to social problems with the consideration of the welfare of the people. Silhak scholars encouraged human equality and moved toward a more Korean-centric view of Korean history. The Silhak school is credited with helping to create modern Korea.

== Prominent scholars ==
- Yi Ji-ham (1517–1578), a scholar, seer, and public official who implemented related programs while serving as magistrate of Pocheon and Asan. While he predates Silhak as an explicit approach, his legend has been connected to the Silhak movement.
- Kim Yuk (1580–1658) postwar reformer who vigorously advocated Daedongbeop (Uniform Land Tax Law), introduced into Korea a reformed calendar, and supported technological improvements
- Yi Sugwang (1563–1627), scholar-official who introduced Western science, religion, and social studies to Korea.
- Yu Hyeong-won (1622–1673), representing what is sometimes considered the first generation of Silhak scholars, he advocated a "public land system" where the state would hold title and allocate the land for the farmer to use.
- Yi Ik (1681–1764) of the second generation of Silhak scholars, founder of the Gyeongsechiyongpa (경세치용파 經世致用派 School of Administration and Practical Usage).
- An Chŏngpok (1712–1791), student of Yi Ik.
- Yun Hyu (1617–1680)
- Pak Sedang (1629–1703), scholar of poetry, literature, calligraphy and painting.
- Yu Suwŏn (1694–1755) representing what is sometimes considered the founder of the Iyonghusaengpa (이용후생파 利用厚生派 School of Profitable Usage and Benefiting the People).
- Pak Chiwŏn (1737–1805), the center of the Iyonghusaengpa (이용후생파 利用厚生派 School of Profitable Usage and Benefiting the People).
- Sin Kyŏngjun (1712–1781)
- Wi Baek-gyu (1727–1798)
- Hong Taeyong (1731–1783), an astronomer who asserted the Copernican theory.
- Yi Deok-mu (1741–1793)
- Pak Chega (1750–1815), a part of the Northern School of Silhak and was particularly critical of the civil service examinations.
- Kim Chŏnghŭi (1786–1856), representing the Silsagusipa (실사구시파 實事求是派 School of Seeking Evidence)
- Chŏng Yagyong (1762–1836; informally known as "Dasan"), led the third wave of Silhak.
- Seo Yu-gu (1764-1845)
- Choi han-ki (1803-1877)

== See also ==
- Korean Confucianism
- Seohak
- Korean philosophy
