= Yi Ik =

Korean scholar (1681–1763)

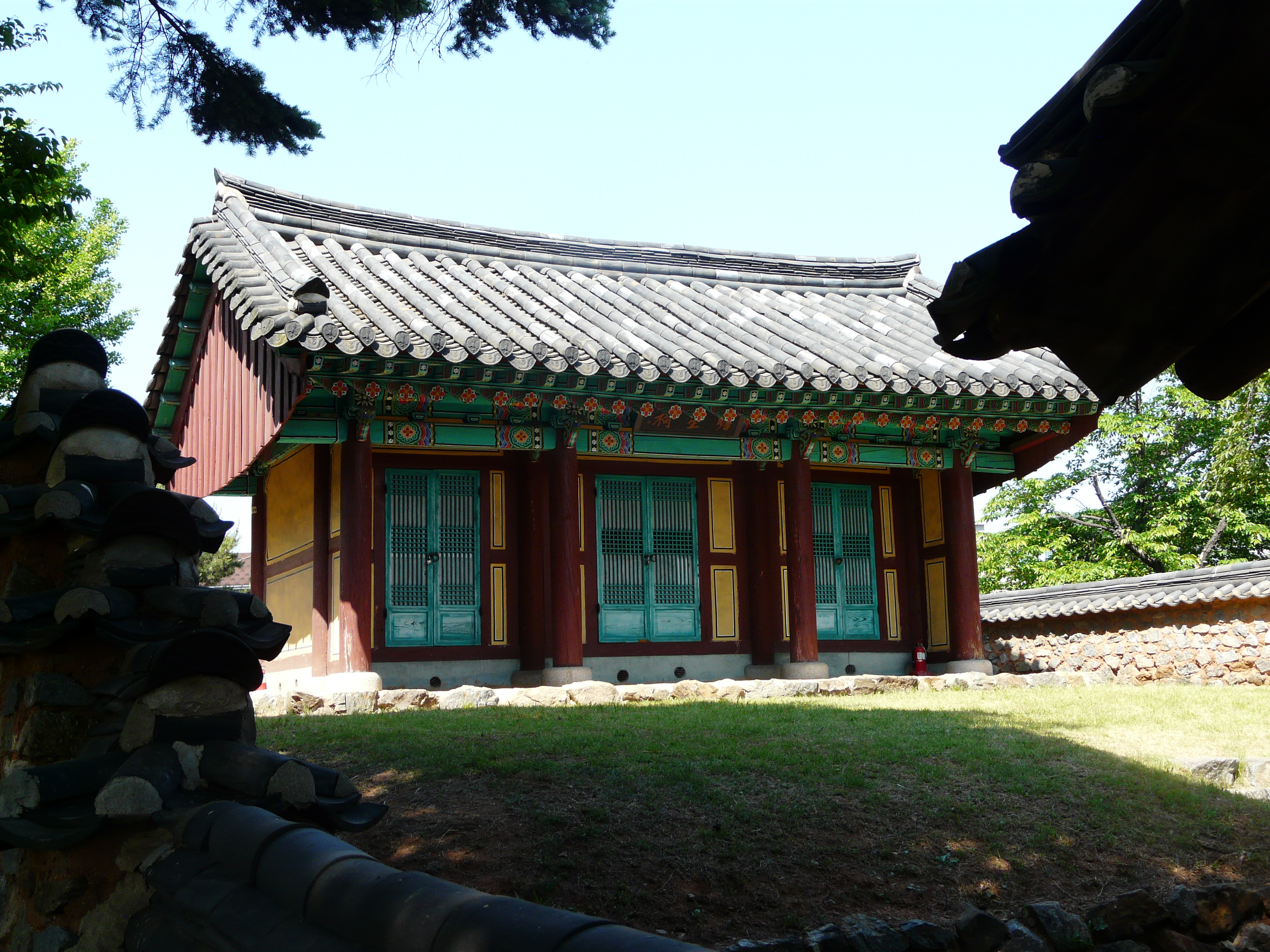
- One of the structures in the Tomb of Yi Ik

Korean name
- Hangul: 이익
- Hanja: 李瀷
- RR: I Ik
- MR: I Ik

Art name
- Hangul: 성호
- Hanja: 星湖
- RR: Seongho
- MR: Sŏngho

Courtesy name
- Hangul: 자신
- Hanja: 子新
- RR: Jasin
- MR: Chasin

Yi Ik (Korean: 이익; Hanja: 李瀷; 1681–1763), art name Sŏngho (성호; 星湖), was a Korean Neo-Confucian scholar, early Silhak philosopher and social critic. He was born to a yangban family of the Yeoju Yi clan. Like most people in his position, he studied for the gwageo in order to gain a position of rank; but failed in his first attempt in 1705. Shortly thereafter, his elder brother Yi Jam was beaten to death as part of the Lady Jang incident, and Yi lost interest in government service.

Yi Ik followed in Yu Hyeong-won line of thought extending in this work Sŏngho sasŏl, which covers subjects as government, economy, and the family, and makes detailed proposals for reordering each aspect of Joseon society. His most famous work was Record of Concern for the Underprivileged which lays down the cardinal principles of reform ideas. As Yi attracted many disciples, Silhak gradually emerged as Joseon dynasty's dominant school of thought.

He was born in Ansan in 1681. In 1967 a monument to him, "Tomb of Yi Ik" was erect there, next to a museum celebrating his life and works.

== Work book ==
- Seŏngho sasŏl (성호사설, 星湖僿說)
- Sŏngho munchip (성호문집, 星湖文集)
- Yijasuŏ (이자수어, 李子粹語)
- Sŏngho jilsŏ (성호질서, 星湖疾書)
- Gwakurok (곽우록, 藿憂錄)

== See also ==
- Korean Confucianism
- Korean philosophy
- List of Korean philosophers
