= Kim Won-hae =

South Korean actor (born 1969)

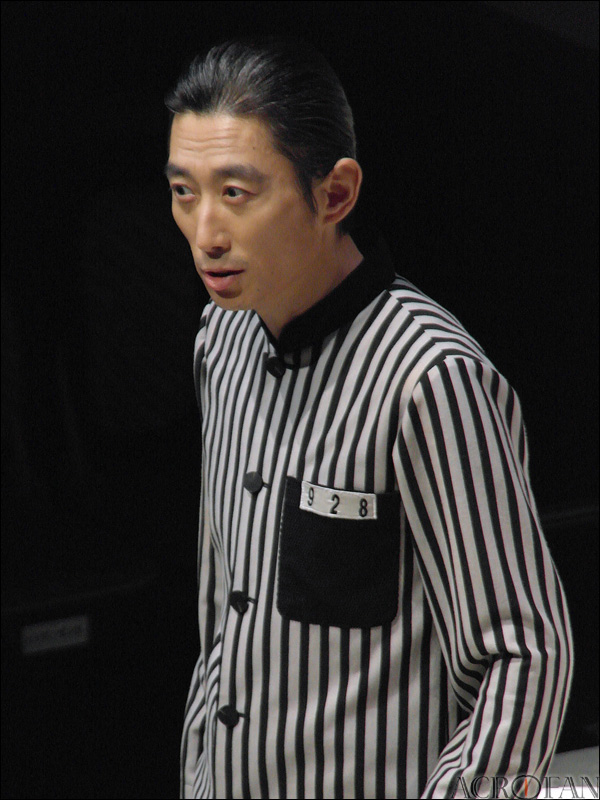
- Kim in 2012
- Born: April 6, 1969 (age 57); Busanjin-gu, Busan, South Korea
- Education: Seoul Institute of the Arts - Theater and Film
- Occupation: Actor
- Years active: 1991–present
- Agent: SSGG Company

Korean name
- Hangul: 김원해
- Hanja: 金元海
- RR: Gim Wonhae
- MR: Kim Wŏnhae

Kim Won-hae (Korean: 김원해; born April 6, 1969) is a South Korean actor. Since his debut in musical in 1991, Kim worked on stage in plays and musicals before joining the non-verbal performance Nanta as an original member in 1997. He is best known as a former cast member of SNL Korea (season 1–4).

== Early life ==
Kim Won-hae was born on May 21, 1969, in Busan, South Korea. He was known as an extrovert who loved grabbing the mic at gatherings from a young age. In school, he was nicknamed "Rascal." He realized, "Oh, there's something this fun in the world," when he started the drama club in high school.

In 1988, he enrolled at the Seoul Institute of the Arts. There, he met Director Jang Jin and Jung Jae-young. They got to know each other through the Dongrang Youth Theater Festival and became close while working together in the same university theater club. After graduating from the Seoul Institute of the Arts, he enrolled in the first class of the dance department at the Korea National University of Arts. However, he was unable to graduate because he was busy performing in the Nanta show.

== Career ==
=== 1991 to 2008: Early career as a theater and musical actor, non-verbal performance Nanta ===
Kim Won-hae made his debut in the musical Iron Kids (철부지들). In 1994 he joined musical Subway Line 1, where he met Sul Kyung-gu, Hwang Jung-min, and Jang Hyun-sung.

Kim Won-hae became an original member of the non-verbal performance Nanta in 1997, following Song Seung-hwan's recommendation. He met founding member Kim Moon-soo, who had joined the group in spring 1996. Produced by PMC Production under co-CEOs Song Seung-hwan and Lee Kwang-ho, Nanta premiered in Korea at Hoam Art Hall in October 1997. Ryu Seung-ryong joined the original cast in 1998, while Jang Hyuk-jin joined later. These actors laid the foundation for Nanta, practicing and performing across Korea and the world. The show became popular and holds the record for the longest-running open run performance in Korea.

After participating in the Edinburgh Festival Fringe in 1999, Nanta toured over 20 countries around the world, including Europe, Japan, Southeast Asia, Australia, and North America, and has recorded an audience occupancy rate of over 90% to date. It continues to attract 70% of foreign tourists and was gaining great popularity.

Nanta was the first performance in Korea to introduce the concept of a dedicated theater. PMC Production opened a 300-seat theater in Gangbuk in Jeong-dong in 2000, followed by another 300-seat theater in Gangnam in Cheongdam-dong in 2002. By 2003, PMC were operating seven theaters. In 2004, PMC opened a state-of-the-art 500-seat theater in Jeong-dong, which was expanded and relocated in January 2004. Nanta consistently maintained high seat occupancy rates.

In 2002, they entered New York, USA, and appeared on the Today Show before Psy.

Nanta made history as the first Asian production to secure an official invitation to Broadway with a $140,000 guarantee. The show's journey to Broadway began when Marie Rose, program director of the New Victory Theater, visited Korea and signed a contract after seeing the performance at the Nanta Theater. Originally scheduled for the first half of 2004, the Broadway run was rescheduled due to the success of its Los Angeles performance. "Nanta" was renamed "Cookin'" and was chosen as the opening act for the 2003-2004 season at the New Victory Theater. Kim flew to New York City to do a four-week performance from October 25 to November 19, 2003. The performance featured 10 actors, including Kim Kang-il, Kim Won-hae, Seo Chu-ja, Seol Ho-yeol, and Lee Beom-chan. It completed a month-long invitational performance at the New Victory Theater on 42nd Street, which is famous for not performing one performance for a long period of time.

Nanta had a successful run at the Off-Broadway Minetta Lane Theater in Greenwich Village, Manhattan. The production, a collaboration between PMC Production and Broadway Asia, had an investment of $1.2 million. After a two-week preview performance starting on February 20, 2004, the show officially opened on March 7. The performance featured 10 actors, including Kim Kang-il, Kim Won-hae, Seo Chu-ja, Seol Ho-yeol, Lee Beom-chan, Yoo Seung-soo, Lee Seong-min, Kang Ji-won, Jeong Hyeong-seok, and Kim Young-hoon. The show ran 8 times a week and received positive feedback from the audience and critics. It was a hit, with sold-out shows and coverage in the New York Times.

=== 2006 to present: Acting hiatus, back to theater and screen debut ===
Kim Won-hae was a member of the Nanta cast from 1997 to 2006, dedicating nearly a decade of his life to the show from the age of 28 to 37. He refers to this period as his "Lost Decade," feeling he had nothing left after those years. Feeling adrift, he took a break and eventually opened a small gimbap restaurant in 2007. One day, Kim received a drunken call from his former understudy, Yoon Jeong-hwan, who was yelling at him, "Why are you rolling gimbap? Aren't you an actor?" Overwhelmed with emotion, Kim couldn't bear leaving acting any longer. In April, Kim returned to the stage in the black comedy play Jjamppong, which Yoon Jeong-hwan had written and directed.

Premiering in 2004, Jjamppong follows the story of the Chunraewon Chinese restaurant family, who mistakenly believe that the Gwangju Uprising was triggered by a jjamppong delivery mishap. As they pursue their modest dreams, the family encounters unexpected challenges. In the 2007 encore performance from April 5 to June 10, 2007, at Shotick Theater 2, Kim played the role of Shin Jak-ro, the head of the Chunraewon Chinese restaurant family. He showed an "insane presence" in the plays.

Feeling left behind by his former colleagues after a hiatus, Kim focused on his theater works, approaching acting with a "rookie" mindset. In his first year back in 2007, he faced financial challenges, as his income was only mere 1.73 million won, earning only 9,000 won per day through theater work and 6,000 won per hour at a supermarket part-time job.

In November, Kim made his television debut with a minor role as Mr. Jin in the KBS drama Beautiful Days. At the end of 2007, Kim joined the cast of Clumsy People alongside actors such as Jang Young-nam, Han Chae-young, Jang Deok-bae, and Ryu Seung-ryong. Clumsy People was opening work of The Best Play Festival 2, returning after four years since the original festival in 2004. Written and directed by Jang Jin, Clumsy People was based on a script he had written in his early career. The performance ran from December 7, 2007, to March 2, 2008, at the Dongsung Arts Center Small Theater.

Kim Won-hae then joined the cast of the third encore performance of The Story of the Neulgeun Thief, which includes existing members such as Park Cheol-min, Hyeong Hyeong-gwan, Park Gil-soo, Jeong Kyung-ho, and Min Seong-wook, as well as Seo Hyeon-cheol, Lee Jun-hyuk, Lee Sang-hong, and Choi Deok-moon. The performance took place at Daehakro Wonder Space Circle Theater from August 8 to January 4, 2009. His performance in the play The Story of the Neulgeun Thief earned him the 1st Young Drama Award, with a prize of 3 million won. This award was established by the cultural arts support forum "Alpha," which is composed of around 60 domestic CEOs, including Samsung Electronics CEO Kwun Oh-hyun. The award ceremony was held on September 19, 2008, at Shinhan Art Hall in Yeoksam-dong, Gangnam-gu, Seoul.

In 2009, Kim reprised the role of Shin Jak-ro in a black comedy play called Jjamppong. The performance took place at Dure Hall, Hall 1 in Daehakro, Seoul from April 23, 2009, to June 28, 2009.

his film debut in 2009 in Jang Jin's Good Morning, President, followed by another of Jang Jin's films, The Quiz Show Scandal (2010).

In 2010, Kim and Seo Hyun-chul were double cast in the lead role of Lee Bong-jo in the play "My Brother Came Back", which was part of The Best Play Festival 3. The play ran from March 6 to July 18, 2010, at the Dongsung Arts Center Small Theater. It explored the disintegration of family in Korean society through black comedy, with the actors alternating in the role of Lee Bong-jo, the authoritarian and violent father. Seo, with his large kind eyes and excellent comic timing, made audiences laugh even in predictable situations, while Kim's serious and deep immersion in the role also drew continuous laughter from the audience.

In their previous collaboration "The Story of Two Old Thieves", the older Seo Hyun-chul played the younger thief, who leads the comic situations, while the younger Kim played the older thief, delivering laughs a half-beat later. Kim said, "I tried really hard to learn the art of comedy acting from my senior, but it's really something you're born with, and I can't catch up." Kim, whose comedic instincts are stronger, also said, "I've tried various things, but there's no weapon like sincere acting."

Jang Jin selected Kim as one of the 16 members of tvN's "Saturday Night Live Korea" in 2011, where he began to gain popularity. He also had a role in Jang Jin's film "Romantic Heaven" (2011) and Kang Hyeong-cheol's film "Sunny" (2011).

The work that showcased Kim's charm was "Kisaragi Miki-chan" in 2011. It was a play that marked Kim's first venture into translated plays, despite his usual preference for original works. He claimed to dislike the awkward tone of translated plays. In this work, he portrayed the character Kimura Takuya, who was armed with a complex about his appearance and a clumsy charisma, and he quickly rose to the top of the comedy scene in Daehak-ro.

In late 2011, Kim became a part of the cast for the first production of The Best Play Festival 4 "Return to Hamlet." Written and directed by Jang Jin, the play tells the story of actor Jin-woo, who takes on various roles to make ends meet. Set in a theater dressing room during a production of Hamlet, the play captures candid moments of actors preparing for the final performance. The show ran from December 9, 2011, to April 8, 2012, at the Dongsung Arts Center Small Theater.

In 2012, Kim starred in the film "As One" and the South Korean TV series "Queen and I." In 2013, he had minor roles in several films and dramas. His growing popularity led to a role in tvN's series "High School King of Savvy" (2014). In the drama "Misaeng: Incomplete Life" (2014), he received acclaim for his role as the new head of the Sales Team, portraying a realistic and strict boss.

In 2014, Jang Jin Man starred in "High Heels." His breakthrough came through notable performances in films like "The Admiral: Roaring Currents," "Himalaya," and "The Pirates." In the movie "Roaring Currents," released on July 30, he plays a realistic character, while in the movie "The Pirates," released on August 6, he portrays the comical and cheerful character Chun-seop, showcasing different charms.

In subsequent years, Kim showcased his versatility in roles like Detective Kim Gye Chul in Signal, a neighborhood thug in Asura, and a school director in Drinking Solo. He received critical acclaim for his roles in Strong Woman Do Bong Soon and While You Were Sleeping, winning awards for his performances. In 2018, he won the Best Supporting Actor award at the KBS Drama Awards and delivered a remarkable performance in Clean with Passion for Now. He continued to appear in various dramas and movies, showcasing his acting skills and versatility.

In the drama Good Manager, Kim Won-hae's dazzling sword performance appeared. In the drama, he played Manager Chu of the accounting department and was shown making fried rice with knife skills that were almost acrobatic. This scene was made possible thanks to his experience at Nanta for over 10 years.

Kim Won-hae and other original members of Nanta, Kim Moon-soo, Ryu Seung-ryong, and Jang Hyuk-jin, celebrated the show's 20th anniversary with a special event in 2017. The gathering took place at the Nanta Theater in Chungjeong-ro, Seodaemun-gu, Seoul on October 13.

== Personal life ==
At the 2009 Theater Festival Awards, he made headlines with his acceptance speech, saying, "Since I had no roles and was just swinging a baseball bat at home, my elementary school daughter wrote down that my job was a baseball player."

Known for his close friendship with actor Hwang Jung Min, Kim has collaborated with him in several projects. Their strong bond, both personally and professionally, has contributed to Kim's success in the industry.

In August 2020, it was reported that Kim tested positive for COVID-19 and was receiving treatment. He had recovered since September 2020.

== Filmography ==
=== Film ===
Year	Title	Role	Ref.
2009	Good Morning President	Gyeong-ja's advisor 2	
2009	The Executioner	Fraud inmate	
2009	Salt		
2010	The Quiz Show Scandal	Officer Kim	
2011	Romantic Heaven	Detective Park	
2011	Sunny	Student liaison teacher	
2012	As One	Korean announcer	
2013	My Little Hero	PD Han	
2013	Happiness for Sale	Unidentified Mr. Jang	
2013	Hide and Seek	Sung-cheol	
2013	My Dear Girl, Jin-young	Priest	
2014	Man on High Heels	Male elevator resident	
2014	The Admiral: Roaring Currents	Bae Seol	
2014	The Pirates	Choon-seop	
2014	Tazza: The Hidden Card	Artist Jo	
2014	Whistle Blower	Late-night taxi driver	
2014	We Are Brothers	Yeosu police officer	
2015	Detective K: Secret of the Lost Island	Sato (cameo)	
2015	Granny's Got Talent	Moderator	
2015	The Long Way Home	Deputy Jeon	
2015	The Himalayas	Kim Moo-young	
2016	SORI: Voice from the Heart	Goo-cheol	
2016	A Violent Prosecutor	Young-cheol	
2016	Missing You	Section chief Ban	
2016	Asura: The City of Madness	Crocodile	
2016	Life Risking Romance	Senior patrol officer Park	
2017	The Battleship Island	Peninsula Hotel manager	
2018	Heung-boo: The Revolutionist	Kim Eung-jip	
2019	No Mercy	CEO Jung	
2019	Forbidden Dream	Cho Soon-saeng	
2020	Time to Hunt	Bin-dae (cameo)	
2020	Samjin Company English Class	Ahn Gi-chang	
2022	Come Back Home		
2022	Confidential Assignment 2: International	Sergey	
2024	Dead Man	Gong Moon-sik	
2025	Hi-5	Doctor Oh (cameo)	

=== Television series ===
Year	Title	Role	Notes	Ref.
2007–2008	Beautiful Days	Mr. Jin		
2012	Queen and I	Eunuch Hong		
2013	Nine	Park Chang-min at 1992/2012		
2013	Reply 1994	Sseureki's father		
2014	High School King of Savvy	Han Young-seok		
2014	Plus Nine Boys	Jo Won-hae		
2014	Modern Farmer	Doksa		
2014	Misaeng: Incomplete Life	Park Young-ho		
2015	KBS Drama Special – "Fake Family"	Lee Myung-gook		
2015–2016	Sweet, Savage Family	Son Se-woon		
2016	Signal	Kim Kye-cheol		
2016	Monster	Min Byung-ho		
2016	Drinking Solo	Kim Won-hae		
2016	Woman with a Suitcase	Director Shim	cameo	
2016	KBS Drama Special – "Disqualified Laughter"	Air Force's rising captain	cameo	
2016–2017	Hwarang: The Poet Warrior Youth	Woo-reuk		
2017	Good Manager	Choo Nam-ho		
2017	Tomorrow, with You	Yoo So-joon's father	cameo	
2017	Strong Girl Bong-soon	Kim Kwang-bok / Oh Dol-ppyeo		
2017	The Bride of Habaek	Taxi driver	cameo	
2017	Criminal Minds	Kim Yong-cheol		
2017	KBS Drama Special – "You're Closer than I Think"		cameo	
2017	While You Were Sleeping	Choi Dam-dong		
2017	Black	Na Gwang-gyeon		
2017	Drama Stage – "Today I Grab the Tambourine Again"	Tambourine instructor	cameo	
2018	Queen of Mystery 2	Jo In-ho		
2018	A Poem a Day	Kim Jung-soo	cameo	
2018	The Miracle We Met	Mortician	cameo	
2018	Are You Human?	Kang Jae-sik		
2018	Life	Lee Dong-soo		
2018	The Ghost Detective	Han Sang-seop		
2018	Where Stars Land	Park Tae-hee		
2018	KBS Drama Special – "Dreamers"	Crime department chief	cameo	
2018	Feel Good To Die	Subway train driver	cameo	
2018	Clean with Passion for Now	Gil Gong-tae		
2018	The Hymn of Death	Yoon Suk-ho		
2018–2024	Player	Jang In-gyu	Seasons 1–2	
2019	He Is Psychometric	Math teacher		
2019	Hotel del Luna	Park Gyu-ho	cameo	
2019	When the Devil Calls Your Name	Kong Soo-rae		
2019	Miss Lee	Sr. Park	cameo	
2019	Melting Me Softly	Ma Pil-gu / Ma Dong-sik		
2019	Chocolate	Kwon Hyun-seok		
2019–2024	The Fiery Priest	Vladimir Gojayev / Ko Dok-sung	Seasons 1–2	
2020	How to Buy a Friend	Park Choong-chae		
2020	Graceful Friends	Cheon Man-shik		
2020	Stranger	Director Noh		
2020	Start-Up	Nam Do-san's father		
2020	Awaken	Hwang Byeong-cheol		
2020	Hush	Jung Se-joon		
2021	Run On	Bartender	cameo	
2021	Youth of May	Kim Hyun-cheol		
2021	Monthly Magazine Home	Choi Go		
2021	One the Woman	Ryu Seung-deok		
2022	Through the Darkness	Hao Gil-pyo		
2022	From Now On, Showtime!	Park Soo-moodang / Cha Sa-geum		
2022	Link: Eat, Love, Kill		cameo	
2022	The Law Cafe	CEO Hwang		
2022	The Empire	Do-pil / Ji Joon-gi		
2022	Behind Every Star	Cho Ki-bong		
2023	The Good Bad Mother	Son Yong-rak		
2023	Revenant	Seo Mun-chun		
2023	Strong Girl Nam-soon	Polearm seller	cameo	
2023–2024	Death's Game	Homeless man	cameo	
2024	Lovely Runner	Ryu Guen-Deok		
2024	Serendipity's Embrace	Kim Bok-Nam		
2024	A Virtuous Business	Choi Won-bong		
2025	The Trauma Code: Heroes on Call	Hong Jae-hun		
2025	The Divorce Insurance	Na Dae-bok		
2025	Trigger	Cho Hyun-sik		
2025	As You Stood By	Jo Jung-nam		
2025	Idol I			
2026	Can This Love Be Translated?	Kim Young-hwan	Joo Ho-jin's teacher	
2026	Undercover Miss Hong	Yoon Jae-beom		

=== Variety show ===
Year	Title	Notes	Ref.
2011–2013	Saturday Night Live Korea	Cast member (season 1–4)	

== Stage ==
=== Musical ===
Musical play performances
Year	Title		Role	Theater	Date	Ref.
Year	English	Korean	Role	Theater	Date	Ref.
1991	Iron Kids	철부지들	—	Debut work		
1992	It's a Wheel	얼레야	Undertaker	Washington Kennedy Center Hall, Chicago Illinois Skokie Center, California Lowell Theater, San Jose Performing Arts Center	October 30 to November 8	
1994–1997	Subway Line 1	지하철 1호선	Multi-roles	Hakjeon Theater	1994–1997	
1994	Song of Oil Painting - Korean Musical "Changmugeuk"	유화의 노래 - 한국적 뮤지컬 「창무극」	3rd Prince	Cultural Center Grand Theater	November 24 to 28	
1997	Nanta	난타	Head Chef	Hoam Art Hall	October 1997	
1998	Nanta	난타	Head Chef	Dongsung Art Center Dongsung Hall	March 26 to May 3	
1999	Nanta	난타	Head Chef	Myeongdong Jeongdong Theater (foundation)	May 10	
1999	Nanta	난타	Head Chef	Edinburgh Festival Fringe	August 15 to September 4	
2000	12th Geochang International Theatre Festival: Nanta	(제12회) 거창국제연극제; 난타	Head Chef	Su Seung Dae Outdoor Theater	August 4	
2000–2006	Nanta	난타	Head Chef	PMC Nanta Theater	Open Run (2000–2006)	

=== Theater ===
Theater play performances
Year	Title		Role	Theater	Date	Ref.
Year	English	Korean	Role	Theater	Date	Ref.
1993	Sanghwa and Sanghwa	상화와상화	—	Cultural Center Grand Theatre	September 9 to 16	
1994	Ah, Lee Sang!	(제18회) 서울연극제 : 아, 이상(李箱)!	—	Cultural Center Small Theatre	September 29 to October 11	
1995	The Obscene Tale of Chunhyang - A Unique Work by Novelist Kim Ju-young	외설 춘향전 - 소설가 김주영의 이색작품	Host	Constellation Theatre	January 18 to March 5	
1995	Die Hose	팬티	—	Samteo Blue Bird Theater	August 2 to September 17	
1995	19th Seoul Theatre Festival: Squeak	(제19회) 서울연극제 : 끽다거	—	Cultural Center Grand Theatre	October 12	
1996	20th Seoul Theatre Festival: A real Melodrama	(제20회) 서울연극제 : 진짜 신파극	Aiko	Arts Center Small Theater	October 2 to 15	
1997	21st Seoul Theater Festival: Yoon Dong-ju	(제21회) 서울연극제 : 윤동주	Oh Dong-cheol	Cultural Center Grand Theatre	September 19 to 24	
2007	Jjamppong	짬뽕	Shin-ak-ro	Shotick Theater 2 (former Valentine Theater 2)	April 5 – June 10, 2007	
2007–2008	The Best Play Festival 2 - Jang Jin's Clumsy People	연극열전2 - 장진의 서툰사람들	Multiman	Dongsoong Art Center Small Theater	December 7, 2007 - March 16, 2008	
2008–2009	The Best Play Festival 2 - The Story of an Old Thief	연극열전2 - 늘근도둑 이야기	The Older Thief	Dongyang Art Theater 3 (former Daehakro Wonder Space Circle Theater)	August 8, 2008 - January 4, 2009	
2008–2009	The Best Play Festival 2 - The Story of an Old Thief	연극열전2 - 늘근도둑 이야기	The Older Thief	Busan Kyungsung University Concert Hall	December 22, 2008 - December 31, 2008	
2009-2010	The Story of an Old Thief	늘근도둑 이야기	The Older Thief	Sangmyung Art Hall 1	January 8, 2009 - January 3, 2010	
2009	The Story of an Old Thief	늘근도둑 이야기	The Older Thief	CMB Expo Art Hall	March 27 to 29, 2009	
2009	The Story of an Old Thief	늘근도둑 이야기	The Older Thief	Daegu Bongsam Culture Center	April 2 to 19, 2009	
2009	The Story of an Old Thief	늘근도둑 이야기	The Older Thief	Nowon Culture and Arts Center Grand Theater	April 23 to 25, 2009	
2009	Jjamppong	짬뽕	Shin Jak-ro	Daehakro Hall (former Dure Hall, Hall 1)	April 23 to June 28, 2009	
2009-2010	The Story of an Old Thief	늘근도둑 이야기	The Older Thief	COEX Art Hall	May 1, 2009 - March 1, 2010	
2009	The Story of an Old Thief	늘근도둑 이야기	The Less Older Thief	Icheon Art Hall Small Theater	September 12 to 13, 2009	
2009	The Story of an Old Thief	늘근도둑 이야기	The Older Thief	Busan Citizens' Hall Grand Theater	October 17 to 18, 2009	
2009-2010	The Story of an Old Thief	늘근도둑 이야기	Detective, Neighborhood Dancer	Prime Art Hall, Sindorim	November 12, 2009 - January 31, 2010	
2009	The Story of an Old Thief	늘근도둑 이야기	The Older Thief	Daegu Concert House Grand Hall (former Daegu City Hall)	November 20, 2009 - November 22, 2009	
2009	The Story of an Old Thief	늘근도둑 이야기	The Older Thief	Chungbuk Student Cultural Center Grand Theater	December 18, 2009 - December 19, 2009	
2010	The Story of an Old Thief - Daehangno	늘근도둑 이야기 - 대학로	The Older Thief	Ginin Theater (former Art and Nucleus Small Theater)	January 8, 2010 - March 1, 2010	
2010	The Story of an Old Thief - Daehangno	늘근도둑 이야기 - 대학로	The Older Thief	Gwangju 5.18 Cultural Center Democratic Hall	February 20 to 21, 2010	
2010	The Best Play Festival 3 - My Brother Came Back	연극열전3 - 오빠가 돌아왔다	Lee Bong-jo (Dad)	Dongsoong Art Center Small Theater	March 6 to July 18, 2010	
2010	Jjamppong	짬뽕	Shin Jak-ro	Sundol Theater, Daehangno	April 28 to June 6, 2010	
2010	Jjamppong	짬뽕	Shin Jak-ro	Artisan Hall, Daehangno	June 15 to July 18, 2010	
2011	Jjamppong	짬뽕	Shin Jak-ro	The STAGE	May 12 to June 12, 2011	
2011	Kisaragi Miki-chan; We only love	키사라기 미키짱; 우리만 사랑해	Takuya Kimura	Daehakro Culture Space NU	June 9, 2011	
2011	Jjamppong	짬뽕	Shin Jak-ro	Plus Theatre (ex. Culture Space N.U.)	June to August 7, 2011	
2011	Jjamppong	짬뽕	Shin Jak-ro	Ansan Culture and Arts Centre Moon theatre	September 24 to 25, 2011	
2011	Jjamppong	짬뽕	Shin Jak-ro	Dongsung Art Centre Dongsung Hall	December 9, 2011, to April 8, 2012	
2011–2012	The Best Play Festival 4 — First work "Return to Hamlet"	<연극열전4> 첫 번째 작품 <리턴 투 햄릿>	Jin-woo	Dongsung Arts Center’s Dongsung Hall	December 9, 2011, to April 8, 2012	
2012	The Best Play Festival 4 — First work "Return to Hamlet"	<연극열전4> 첫 번째 작품 <리턴 투 햄릿>	Jin-woo	Uijeongbu Arts Centre Small Theatre	April 13 to 14, 2012	
2012	The Best Play Festival 4 — First work "Return to Hamlet"	<연극열전4> 첫 번째 작품 <리턴 투 햄릿>	Jin-woo	Seongnam Art Centre Ensemble Theatre	June 8 to 10, 2012	
2012	Miss	허탕	Prisoner 1	Dongsung Art Centre Small Theatre	June 15, 2012 - September 2, 2012	
2013	Clumsy People	서툰 사람들	Kim Chu-rak, Seo Ppa-ho, Yu Dal-su	COEX Art Hall	February 7, 2013 - September 1, 2013	
2013	Jjamppong	짬뽕	Shin Jak-ro	Daehak-ro Moonlight Theatre	May 10, 2013 - September 8, 2013	
2013	Goodbye, My Butterfly	안녕, 마이 버터플라이		Seoul Arts Centre Free Small Theatre	July 5, 2013 - July 28, 2013	
2014	Tiny Super Mansion	타이니슈퍼맨션		Theatre Lab, Hyehwa-dong 1	August 29, 2014 - August 31, 2014	
2014	Goodbye, My Butterfly	안녕, 마이 버터플라이		Mapo Art Centre Art Hall Mac	September 19, 2014 - September 20, 2014	
2015	Tiny Super Mansion	타이니슈퍼맨션		Chungmu Art Centre Small Theatre Blue	January 10, 2015 - January 14, 2015	
2015	Okepy	오케피	Viola Player	LG Art Centre	December 18, 2015 - February 28, 2016	
2016	Okepy	오케피	Viola Player	Daejeon Arts Centre Art Hall	March 18, 2016 - March 20, 2016	
2016	Okepy	오케피	Viola Player	Goyang Aram Nuri Aram Theatre	April 1, 2016 - April 3, 2016	
2016	Okepy	오케피	Viola Player	Gunpo Culture and Arts Centre Suri Hall (large performance hall)	April 15, 2016 - April 17, 2016	
2016	Jjamppong	짬뽕	Shin Jak-ro	Seongsu Art Hall	June 7, 2016 - June 26, 2016	
2017	Jjamppong	짬뽕	Shin Jak-ro	Sindorim Prime Art Hall	May 11, 2017 - July 2, 2017	
2022	Jjamppong	짬뽕	Shin Jak-ro	Art One Theatre 3	July 1, 2022 - July 17, 2022	
2024	Jjamppong	짬뽕	Shin Jak-ro	Mimaji Art Centre Mulbit Theatre	May 2, 2024 - June 2, 2024	

== Awards and nominations ==
Name of the award ceremony, year presented, category, nominee of the award, and the result of the nomination
Award ceremony	Year	Category	Nominee / Work(s)	Result	Ref.
KBS Drama Awards	2017	Best Supporting Actor	Hwarang: The Poet Warrior Youth, Good Manager	Nominated	
KBS Drama Awards	2018	Best Supporting Actor	The Ghost Detective, Are You Human?	Won	
SBS Drama Awards	2017	Best Supporting Actor	While You Were Sleeping	Won	
SBS Drama Awards	2021	Best Supporting Actor in a Mini-Series Romance/Comedy Drama	One the Woman	Nominated	
SBS Drama Awards	2022	Best Supporting Actor in a Miniseries Genre/Fantasy Drama	Through the Darkness	Nominated	
SBS Drama Awards	2023	Best Supporting Actor in a Miniseries Genre/Fantasy Drama	Revenant	Won	
Scene Stealer Festival	2016	Bonsang	Kim Won-hae	Won	
Young Drama Awards	2008	Best Actor	The Story of an Old Thief	Won	
