= Good Morning President =

- Film poster
- Hangul: 굿모닝 프레지던트
- RR: Gunmoning peurejideonteu
- MR: Kunmoning p'ŭrejidŏnt'ŭ
- Directed by: Jang Jin
- Written by: Jang Jin
- Produced by: Kim Mi-hwa
- Starring: Lee Soon-jae; Jang Dong-gun; Go Doo-shim
- Cinematography: Choe Sang-ho
- Edited by: Kim Sang-bum; Kim Jae-bum
- Music by: Han Jae-gwon
- Distributed by: CJ Entertainment
- Release date: October 22, 2009
- Running time: 132 minutes
- Country: South Korea
- Language: Korean
- Box office: US$16.1 million

Good Morning President (Korean: 굿모닝 프레지던트; RR: Gunmoning peurejideonteu) is a 2009 South Korean satirical comedy-drama film written and directed by Jang Jin that takes viewers to the private quarters of the Blue House during the terms of three fictional presidents (played by Lee Soon-jae, Jang Dong-gun and Go Doo-shim), each trapped between political and ethical choices. It was chosen as the opening film of the 14th Busan International Film Festival and was released in theaters on October 22, 2009.

== Plot ==
The first president depicted in the movie is Kim Jeong-ho, an elderly president at the end of his term. He is a respected leader whose great legacy is bringing democracy to the nation and serving the working class throughout his political life. But Kim is at a moral crossroads when he becomes the unlikely winner of a ₩24 billion lottery jackpot just before retiring. The huge amount of money would guarantee a comfortable life in his old age. However, he remembers announcing to his constituents, smiling before cameras, that if he were to win the lottery, he would donate it to charity. He agonizes in silence, wondering whether to keep it for himself or to make good on his words.

Kim's successor is Cha Ji-wook, the youngest Korean president in history who demonstrates excellent diplomatic skills in handling foreign policies. But even this charismatic president, who is a widowed single father, has three major fears — getting injections, questions from his five-year-old son, and candlelight rallies. One day, a young man asks the president to donate one of his rare tissue-type kidneys, which he says can save his father's life. The president struggles to decide whether or not he should go through a fearful medical procedure. He also reconnects with a childhood crush.

Last but not least, there is Han Gyeong-ja, the country's first female president who is constantly at odds with her troublemaking husband. She finds it more difficult to resolve personal problems related to her reckless husband than to manage state affairs. Entangled in a big corruption scandal involving her husband's real estate speculation, she is offered a divorce to save her presidency. She is now forced to choose between her family and her country.

== Cast ==
- Lee Soon-jae as Kim Jeong Ho
- Jang Dong-gun as Cha Ji Wook
- Go Doo-shim as Han Gyeong Ja
- Im Ha-ryong as Choi Chang Myeon
- Han Chae-young as Kim Yi Yeon
- Lee Moon-soo as Blue House executive chef
- Park Hae-il as man requesting a transplant
- Lee Hae-young as head secretary Moon Young Chul
- Joo Jin-mo as chief of Secret Service
- Jung Gyu-soo as Kim Jeong-ho's chief of staff
- Jeon Yang-ja as Kim Jeong-ho's wife
- Jang Young-nam as Cha Ji Wook's staff adviser
- Park Jun-seo as Chang-myeon's attache
- Jeon Gook-hwan as Congressman 1
- Lee Han-wi as Congressman 2
- Jo Deok-hyeon as Congressman Choi
- Lee Yong-yi as old mom
- Choi Ji-na as waltz teacher
- Kim Il-woong
- Lee Cheol-min
- Gong Hyung-jin as motorcycle delivery man
- Seung Hyo-bin as Kyeong-Ja's secretary
- Ryu Seung-ryong as North Korean emissary
- Chae Byeong-chan as male college student
- Jung Yu Mi as Mimi
- Song Young-gyu as Cha Ji-wook's doctor
- Kong Ho-suk as Gyeong-ja's advisor
- Kim Won-hae as Gyeong-ja's advisor 2

== Background ==
Only a few decades ago, the president was an off-limits subject in Korean cinema. It was almost impossible for the older generation who lived through military dictatorships to parody their president. Times have changed, however, and the head of state has been an interesting and appealing character to portray in Korean movies and dramas in recent years. Good Morning, President is a film that brings to light the human side of the nation's top leader. The political comedy is directed by Jang Jin, well known for using a unique sense of humor to add spice to a plot, poking fun at politics, and providing some good laughs. On top of good humor and laughter, the movie presents the director's ideal vision of how Korean presidents should be. The three presidents depicted in the movie are charismatic, moral and unselfish, although they agonize over their choices between public interest and personal happiness. The director, who also wrote the script, said it was free of political ideology and instead was a "fun movie everyone can enjoy."

== Awards and nominations ==
Award ceremony	Category	Recipients	Result
30th Blue Dragon Film Awards	Best Film	Good Morning President	Nominated
30th Blue Dragon Film Awards	Best Director	Jang Jin	Nominated
30th Blue Dragon Film Awards	Best Actor	Jang Dong-gun	Nominated
2012 APAN Star Awards	Achievement Award	Lee Soon-jae	Won
