= Public Enemy Returns =

- Theatrical poster
- Hangul: 강철중: 공공의 적 1-1
- Hanja: 강철중: 公共의 敵 1-1
- RR: Gangcheoljung: gonggongui jeok 1-1
- MR: Kangch'ŏljung: konggongŭi chŏk 1-1
- Directed by: Kang Woo-suk
- Written by: Jang Jin
- Produced by: Kim Joo-sung; Jeong Seon-yeong
- Starring: Sul Kyung-gu; Jung Jae-young
- Cinematography: Kim Sung-bok
- Edited by: Ko Im-pyo
- Music by: Jo Yeong-wook
- Production company: Cinema Service
- Distributed by: CJ Entertainment
- Release date: June 19, 2008 (South Korea)
- Running time: 127 minutes
- Country: South Korea
- Language: Korean
- Box office: US$27.2 million

Public Enemy Returns (Korean: 강철중) is a 2008 South Korean neo-noir action thriller film directed by Kang Woo-suk. It is the sequel and final film to Public Enemy (2002) and Another Public Enemy (2005), also directed by Kang.

2007 was a poor year for South Korean cinema, largely due to the reduced screen quota from 146 to 73 days as part of the 2007 free trade agreement between the US and South Korea. This resulted in production costs rising, a series of box office failures, and the number of Korean films sold overseas dropping. During May 2008, only 7.8% of films shown in South Korea were Korean, the lowest level since records began in 2000. It was hoped that the Korean film industry might rally behind Public Enemy Returns. The film sold 4,337,983 tickets nationwide and was the 4th most attended film of 2008.

== Synopsis ==
In debt and out of money, Kang Chul-joong (Sul Kyung-gu) is tired of being a cop and looking to retire. But his boss gives him one last case, an investigation of the president of Geo Seong Enterprises, Lee Won-sool (Jung Jae-young), and some recent murders.

== Cast ==
- Sul Kyung-gu as Kang Chul-joong
- Jung Jae-young as Lee Won-sool
- Kang Shin-il as Squad chief Uhm
- Lee Moon-sik as An-soo
- Yoo Hae-jin as Yong-man
- Kim Jeong-hak as Detective Kim
- Kim Nam-gil (credited as Lee Han) as Mun-su
- Moon Sung-keun as Tae-san
- Lee Min-ho as Jung Ha-yeon

== Awards and nominations ==
2008 Blue Dragon Film Awards

- Nomination - Best Actor - Sul Kyung-gu
- Nomination - Best New Actor - Kim Nam-gil

2008 Korean Film Awards

- Nomination - Best Supporting Actor - Kang Shin-il

2009 Baeksang Arts Awards

- Grand Prize for Film - Kang Woo-suk
- Nomination - Best Director - Kang Woo-suk
- Nomination - Best Actor - Sul Kyung-gu
- Nomination - Best Screenplay - Jang Jin
