= Scene Stealer Festival =

Annual South Korean actor awards

- Awarded for: Excellence in Acting Performances
- First award: 2015
- Final award: 2021
- Website: Scene Stealer Festival on Facebook

The Scene Stealer Festival (Korean: 신스틸러 페스티벌) is an awards ceremony recognizing actors for screen presence and acting ability. Each year, jury members select 22 scene stealers among all the actors who were actively engaged in films and dramas based on online big data collected and analyzed from the prior two years. The first festival was held at Seogwipo Arts Center in Jeju Island, Jeju Province, on September 2, 2015. For the second festival, the jury added awards for a director as well as an achievement award to honor a veteran actor or actress. Two of the 22 awards were also reserved for a young actor and actress chosen by jury members. The event took place at the Jangchung Arena near Dongguk University in the Jung District of Seoul on July 19, 2016. 3rd scene stealer festival was hosted virtually in a studio near Gangnam in December 7, 2021 after a long break because of the covid outbreak, evaluating performances of actors from 2019 to 2021.

== Categories ==
- 22 Scene Stealers of the Year
- Achievement Award (in 2016)
- Director Award (in 2016)
- Male and Female Rookie of the Year (in 2016)
- Special Tribute (in 2021)

== Awards ==
A number of awards are handed out each year, including:

=== 22 Scene Stealers of the Year ===
No.	Year	Recipients
1	2015	Oh Dal-su, Yoo Hae-jin, Jin Kyung, Oh Kwang-rok, Ahn Gil-kang, Jung Man-sik, Jang Gwang, Park Hyuk-kwon, Park Chul-min, Kim Roi-ha, Gi Ju-bong, Go Soo-hee, Kim Sung-oh, Kim Jung-tae, Lee Moon-sik, Lee Mi-do, Lee Won-jong, Lee Jae-yong, Park Chul-min, Jung Suk-yong, Hwang Seok-jeong, Lee Joon
2	2016	Ko Chang-seok, Kim Sang-ho, Kim Hee-won, Park Chul-min, Kim In-kwon, Sung Ji-ru, Oh Jung-se, Jo Jae-yoon, Jang Hyun-sung, Lee Han-wi, Lee Byung-joon, Kim Won-hae, Lee Seung-jun, Kim Eung-soo, Kim Byeong-ok, Ra Mi-ran, Moon Jeong-hee, Ye Ji-won, Jang Young-nam, Ryu Hyun-kyung
3	2021	Kim In-kwon, Kim Byeong-ok, Jung Hae-kyun, Kim young sun, Nam Kyong-eup, Moon Hee-kyung, Son Dam-bi, Jin Seon-kyu, Lee Jung-jun, (Note: who played one of the unmasked guards in Squid Game) Ahn Chang-hwan, Lee Kyu-sung, Jin Seo-yeon, Lee Jung-eun, Jeong Yeong-ju, Yang Hyun-min, Ji Dae-han, So Hee-jung, Lee Joong-ok
4	2022–2023	Bae Jung-nam, Bae Woo-hee, Bae Yoo-ram, Cho Dal-hwan. Hwang Bo-ra, Im Chul-soo, Jeon Soo-kyung, Jung Soo-young, Kang Ki-doong, Kim Hyun-sook, Kwak Dong-yeon, Lee Jun-young, Nam Kyong-eup, Oh Chang-seok, Oh Dae-hwan, Oh Nara, Ryu Hyun-kyung, Ryu Seung-soo, and Tae In-ho.

=== Achievement Award ===
No.	Year	Recipients
2nd	2016	Kim Young-ok
4th	2023	Lee Soon-jae

=== Rookie Scene Stealers of the Year ===
No.	Year	Recipients
2	2016	Shin Hye-sun, Onew

=== Director Award ===
No.	Year	Recipients
2	2016	Kim Han-min

=== Special tribute ===
No.	Year	Recipients
2	2021	Oh Yeong-su
