= Righteous Ties =

- Theatrical poster
- Hangul: 거룩한 계보
- RR: Georukhan gyebo
- MR: Kŏrukhan kyebo
- Directed by: Jang Jin
- Written by: Jang Jin
- Produced by: Lee Byeong-hyeok
- Starring: Jung Jae-young; Jung Joon-ho
- Cinematography: Choi Sang-ho
- Edited by: Steve M. Choe
- Music by: Park Geun-tae
- Distributed by: CJ Entertainment
- Release date: October 19, 2006
- Running time: 126 minutes
- Country: South Korea
- Language: Korean
- Budget: US$4.5 million
- Box office: US$8,682,703

Righteous Ties (Korean: 거룩한 계보; RR: Georukhan gyebo) is a 2006 South Korean crime film written and directed by Jang Jin.

== Plot ==
Chi-sung, a gangster, is sent to prison for seven years after stabbing a man on orders from his boss. But his boss betrays him and tries to have him killed, though the attempt is unsuccessful and Chi-sung manages to escape. His childhood friend Joo-joong is given the task of tracking him down, forcing him to choose between his friendship and loyalty to his gang.

== Cast ==
- Jung Jae-young as Dong Chi-sung
- Jung Joon-ho as Kim Ju-jung
- Ryu Seung-ryong as Jung Sun-tan
- Min Ji-hwan as Kim Young-hee
- Shin Goo as Chi-sung's father
- Lee Yong-yi as Chi-sung's mother
- Kim Dong-ju
- Yoon Yoo-sun as Hwa-yi
- Lee Moon-soo as death row inmate
- Joo Jin-mo
- Jang Young-nam
- Jung Gyu-soo
- Kim Kyu-chul as Han-wook
- Kim Il-woong
- Lee Han-wi
- Lee Jeong
- Park Jung-gi
- Im Seung-dae
- Park Jun-se
- Lee Cheol-min as Park Moon-soo
- Kim Sung-hoon
- Kong Ho-suk
- Lee Sang-hoon as Yoo Myung-sik
- Choi Won-tae as young Ju-jung

== Release ==
Righteous Ties was released in South Korea on October 19, 2006, and topped the box office on its opening weekend with 450,134 admissions. The film went on to receive a total of 1,744,677 admissions nationwide, with a gross (as of November 12, 2006) of US$8,682,703.
