= Someone Special =

Someone Special may refer to:

- Someone Special (United States Navy), U.S. Navy recruiting film for the U.S. Navy SEALs during the Vietnam War
- Someone Special (film), South Korean romantic comedy film, 2004
- "Someone Special", song by Swedish rock band Hardcore Superstar from the album Bad Sneakers and a Piña Colada

== See also ==
- "Miracles (Someone Special)", a 2017 song by Coldplay featuring Big Sean
