= Something Special =

Something Special may refer to:

== Music ==
=== Albums ===
- Something Special (Dolly Parton album) or the title song, 1995
- Something Special (George Strait album), 1985
- Something Special (Hampton Hawes album), 1994
- Something Special (Jim Reeves album), 1971
- Something Special (The Kingston Trio album), 1962
- Something Special (Kool & the Gang album), 1981
- Something Special (Sabrina album), 1988
- Something Special (The Sylvers album), 1976
- Something Special – The Best of Bigbang, 2007
- Something Special, by Burl Ives, 1966

=== Songs ===
- "Something Special", by Alex Lloyd from Black the Sun, 1999
- "Something Special", by Eric Clapton from Another Ticket, 1981
- "Something Special", by Pearl Jam from Dark Matter, 2024
- "Something Special", by Pop Smoke from Shoot for the Stars, Aim for the Moon, 2020
- "Something Special", by Steve Miller Band from Abracadabra, 1982
- "Something Special", by Usher from Here I Stand, 2008
- "Something Special (Is Gonna Happen Tonight)", by Patti LaBelle from Winner in You, 1986

== Other uses ==
- Something Special (film), or Willy/Milly, a 1986 American comedic fantasy directed by Paul Schneider
- "Something Special" (short story), a 1957 story by Iris Murdoch
- Something Special (TV series), a British children's programme
- Something Special (whisky), a blended Scotch whisky manufactured by Pernod Ricard

== See also ==
- Someone Special (disambiguation)
- Somethin' Special (disambiguation)
