= Jang Jin =

South Korean film director (born 1971)

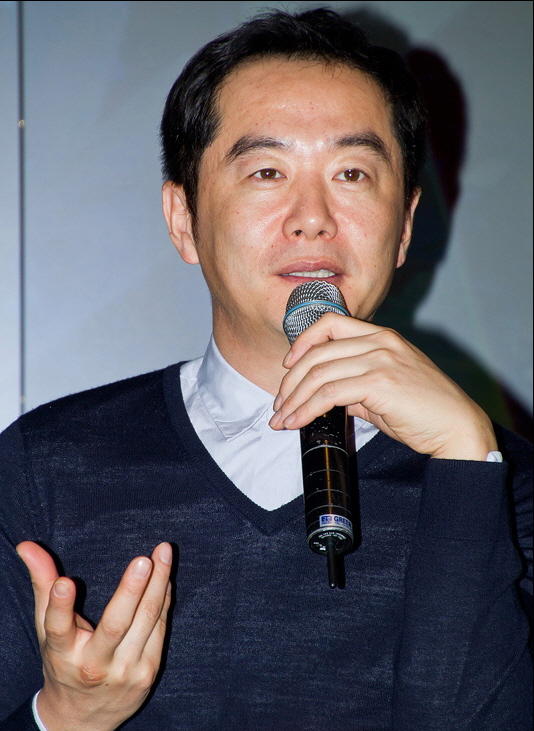
- Jang in March 2011
- Born: February 24, 1971 (age 55); Seoul, South Korea
- Education: Seoul Institute of the Arts; Theater
- Occupations: Film director; theatre director; playwright, screenwriter; film producer; actor
- Years active: 1995–present
- Spouse: Cha Young-eun (m. 2007)
- Children: 2 sons

Korean name
- Hangul: 장진
- Hanja: 張鎭
- RR: Jang Jin
- MR: Chang Chin
- Website: filmitsuda.com

Jang Jin (born February 24, 1971) is a South Korean film director, theatre director, playwright, screenwriter, film producer, actor, and TV personality. Among many of his titles, writing and directing are Jang's main focus. He has written and directed over 15 films since 1995 and some of his most notable works include Welcome to Dongmakgol (2005) and Good Morning President (2009).

== Early life and education ==
Jang Jin was born February 24, 1971 in Seoul, South Korea. Although Jang initially focused on becoming a musician in middle school, after seeing his first theater play in his freshman year of high school he changed his focus and acted in more than 40 plays, receiving good reviews and awards. This experience prompted him to major in theater studies at Seoul Institute of the Arts in 1989.

== Career ==
=== Beginning in 1990s ===
After finishing his degree he joined the writing team for the SBS variety show Good Friends in the mid-1990s. Through this show he created Hollywood Message, which he wrote and edited by himself, where he would take famous scenes from some of the most popular Hollywood films showing in theaters, and make parodies, add silly popups, and mix scenes from different films together to form a bizarre, unique collage of images. Because of his contribution, ratings for the show surged to unexpected heights.

In January 1995, Jang entered The Chosun Ilbo's annual literary contest with Cheonho-dong Crossroad, his first full-fledged script. Using three characters which would feature in most of his theater plays and early films (Hwa-yi, Dal-soo and Deok-bae), his new and creative brand of storytelling won over the judges, who awarded him the top prize. He wrote his first stage play Heotang ("labor in vain") at the age of 21 while serving his military duty, and his followup Clumsy People, not only granted him praise, but was also a success that resulted in actress Song Chae-hwan winning the Best Actress Award at the Seoul Theater Festival. At the same time, he was helping to adapt Song Jae-hee's original into what became A Hot Roof, a feminist comedy where a group of women from all walks of life protest their position in society from the roof of a building, while their husbands and the rest of the city try to cope with all that in the midst of one of the hottest summers Korea had ever seen.

It would take another few years before Jang could start working full-time in Chungmuro, but during that time he built a reputation as one of the most respected theater directors in the country. His 1997 play Taxi Driver was a huge success, displaying his wit and talent for snappy dialogue. The original starred Choi Min-sik as Deok-bae, a taxi driver from the countryside who decides to come to the city, buys a private taxi after his mother sold some land, and hopes to finally make a change in his miserable life.

=== 1998-2004 Debut Film, Suda Theater Troupe and Film It Suda ===
The success of his theater plays raised his profile in the industry. Veteran TV drama director Kim Jong-hak commissioned Jang for a script, but the project was delayed. Jang decided to shop around his script, which led to his debut feature, the 1998 comedy The Happenings (though only half of what he shot ended up in the final cut).

In 1999 Jang founded the theater troupe Suda, and among his regulars were Jung Gyu-soo, Shin Ha-kyun, Jung Jae-young and Jang Young-nam. After working on the play Magic Time, he then shot his second film The Spy, a comedy starring Yoo Oh-sung as a North Korean spy trying to steal the magic formula of the South's "super pig" to combat the famine.

The rest of Jang's career brought him to the top of Korea's A-list directors, with the same brand of "Jang Jin style" crowd pleasers, such as Guns & Talks, a black comedy about four talkative assassins. In 2000 Jang established his own film production outfit Film It Suda, hiring his "family" of fellow writers, producers and directors. Their first production was the three-part omnibus No Comment in 2002.

With his theater and film successes, Jang was finally able to move on to producing and his real passion, writing. But the huge flop of the 2003 melodrama A Man Who Went to Mars (also known as A Letter from Mars, which Jang wrote) brought the company's future to a serious crossroad: either focus on hot items or risk losing everything. Though the aftermath of the film's failure was felt even in 2004, romantic comedy Someone Special had a decent box office performance despite the film's low budget, as well as glowing reviews for its stars Lee Na-young and Jung Jae-young.

=== 2005-2009 Breakthrough Films ===
Jang focused his writing passions on adapting his successful 2000 theater play Leave When They're Applauding into the big screen. The result was 2005's Murder, Take One, about a homicide case being broadcast live for 48 hours, a whodunit with a campy take on the ratings-obsessed media and the viewers' craze for reality TV.

But it would be another of the company's films that became one of the biggest critical and commercial successes of 2005. Adapted by Jang from his same-titled 2002 play, Welcome to Dongmakgol is the story of a remote mountain village where North and South Korean soldiers as well as an American soldier are stranded during the Korean War. The fantasy dramedy was the debut feature of Park Kwang-hyun, one of several of Jang's colleagues from his theater days who joined Film It Suda.

In August 2005 Jang served as theatre director for the first time on a play he didn't write himself. He directed his fellow Seoul Institute of the Arts alumni in a staging of Arthur Miller's Death of a Salesman. The play commemorated the 43rd anniversary for Dongnang Arts Center affiliated to the institute and the 100th birthday of the late Yu Chi-jin, founder of the institute and the nation's first amphitheater.

After his doing his takes on the gangster genre (2006's Righteous Ties) and the melodrama genre (2007's father-centered My Son), Jang wrote the witty script for Ra Hee-chan's Going by the Book, about a mock bank robbery drill that turns embarrassingly real. He also injected an enhanced comic effect into the screenplay of Public Enemy Returns, the third installment in Kang Woo-suk's series on tough detective Kang Cheol-jung (played by Sul Kyung-gu).

His feel-good political satire Good Morning President was the opening film of the 2009 Busan International Film Festival. At the MBC Drama Awards that year, Jang won a Special Award for his 2008 radio show segment Radio Book Club on MBC Standard FM.

=== 2010- ===
His next films, 2010 ensemble comedy The Quiz Show Scandal and 2011 melodrama Romantic Heaven, though well-reviewed, were less successful at the box office.

Besides being the CEO of Film It Suda, he is also co-founder of the film production company KnJ Entertainment Inc. alongside friend Kang Woo-suk.

Jang was a judge on the first and second seasons of Korea's Got Talent. He wrote and directed the first three seasons of sketch comedy show Saturday Night Live Korea and anchored SNL Korea's version of Weekend Update. Jang says he believes satirical comedies can change society for the better.

== Filmmaking ==
Considered one of the most distinctive voices to emerge from the 1990s Korean cinema renaissance, Jang's filmmaking style has amalgamated unconventional storylines, asymmetrical characters, subversive humor, as well as an enthusiastic observation of society and humanism. This has a result into a large public accolade for his style.

Jang has built up an informal "repertory company" of actors who have appeared in many roles in his films. Most notable of these is Jung Jae-young, who has appeared in ten films directed or written by Jang and whom Jang has described as his "muse" . Other frequent collaborators include Shin Ha-kyun, who has been featured in eleven films. Other actors who have appeared in several films by Jang include Ryu Seung-ryong, Jang Young-nam, Im Won-hee, and Cha Seung-won.

Jang usually has a quick cameo in his films.

== Personal life ==
=== Military service ===
He had served in the South Korean Army as part of the country's mandatory military service, from 1991 to 1993.

=== Marriage and family ===
In May 2007, he married then-grad student Cha Young-eun. They have two sons, Jang Cha-in and Jang Cha-yoon.

== Filmography ==
=== Short film ===
Short films work of Jang
Year	Title		Credited as			Notes/Ref.
Year	English	Korean	Director	Writer	Producer	Notes/Ref.
2000	A Terrible Day	극단적 하루	No	Yes	Yes	
2002	No Comment	묻지마 패밀리	No	Yes	No	
2002	Without My Father	아버지 몰래	No	No	Yes	
2004	Has the Shower Ended?	소나기는 그쳤나요?	No	No	Yes	Short film from 1.3.6
2005	Someone Grateful	고마운 사람	No	No	Yes	Short film from If You Were Me 2 (다섯 개의 시선)
2008	U-Turn	유턴	No	Yes	Yes	Short film for SsangYong Actyon (OCN)
2016	If Tomorrow is the Future	내일도 미래라면	Yes	Yes	No	Short film for Sister's Slam Dunk

=== Film ===
Feature films works of Jang
Year	Title		Credited as			Notes/Ref.
Year	English	Korean	Director	Writer	Producer	Notes/Ref.
1995	A Hot Roof	개같은 날의 오후	No	Yes	No	Cameo
1996	Do You Believe in Jazz	너희가 재즈를 믿느냐?	No	Yes	No	
1997	Trio	삼인조	No	Yes	No	
1998	The Happenings	기막힌 사내들	Yes	Yes	No	
1999	The Spy	간첩 리철진	Yes	Yes	No	
2000	Ditto	동감	No	Yes	No	
2001	Guns & Talks	킬러들의 수다	Yes	Yes	No	Cameo
2002	No Comment	묻지마 패밀리	No	Yes	Yes	
2003	A Man Who Went to Mars	화성으로 간 사나이	No	Yes	No	
2004	Someone Special	아는 여자	Yes	Yes	Yes	Cameo
2005	Murder, Take One	박수칠 때 떠나라	Yes	Yes	No	
2005	Welcome to Dongmakgol	웰컴 투 동막골	No	Yes	Yes	
2006	Righteous Ties	거룩한 계보	Yes	Yes	No	Cameo
2007	My Son	아들	Yes	Yes	No	
2007	Going by the Book	바르게 살자	No	Yes	Yes	
2008	Public Enemy Returns	강철중: 공공의 적 1-1	No	Yes	No	
2009	Good Morning, President	굿모닝 프레지던트	Yes	Yes	No	
2010	The Quiz Show Scandal	퀴즈 왕	Yes	Yes	No	Cameo
2010	The Recipe	된장	No	Yes	Yes	
2011	Romantic Heaven	로맨틱 헤븐	Yes	Yes	No	
2014	Man on High Heels	하이힐	Yes	Yes	No	
2014	We Are Brothers	우리는 형제입니다	Yes	Yes	No	
2015	The Sea I Wished for	바라던 바다	Yes	Yes	No	

=== Television ===
Television works of Jang
Year	Title		Credited as				Notes/Ref.
Year	English	Korean	Script Editor	Writer	Director	Producer	Notes/Ref.
1994	Good Friends — Hollywood Message (Note: Portion of SBS variety show Good Friends)	좋은 친구들 — 헐리웃통신	Yes	Yes	No	No	
2011–2012	Saturday Night Live Korea	SNL코리아	No	Yes	Yes	Yes	tvN Sketch comedy show (season 1–3)

Television appearances of Jang
Year	Title		Role	Notes/Ref.
Year	English	Korean	Role	Notes/Ref.
1998	Soonpoong Clinic	순풍산부인과	Actor	SBS Sitcom
2003	Nursery Story	한뼘드라마	Actor	MBC One-episode drama
2006	The Golden Fishery Kneeling Guru	황금어장무릎팍도사 63회	Featured	MBC Variety Show (Episode 63)
2011–2012	Korea's Got Talent	코리아 갓 탤런트	Judge	tvNReality talent show (season 1–2)
2015–2017	Crime Scene	크라임씬	Cast member	JTBC Crime investigation show (season 2–3)
2016	Dream player	드림 플레이어	Cast member	
2017	Maltul club	말술클럽	Cast member	
2021	While You're Having a Hard Time	당신이 혹하는 사이	Storyteller	SBS Crime Thriller Crime Documentary
2022–2023	Black	블랙	Cast member	Channel A Crime Thriller Crime Documentary (Season 1–2)

== Stage ==
=== Theater ===
Theater works of Jang
Year	Title		Credited as		Restage	Ref.
Year	English	Korean	Director	Playwright	Restage	Ref.
1995	Heotang	허탕	Yes	Yes	1999, 2012	
1995	Clumsy People	서툰 사람들	Yes	Yes	2004, 2007, 2008, 2009, 2010, 2012; 2022–2023	
1997	Taxi Driver	택시드리벌	Yes	Yes	2000, 2004, 2015	
1999	Magic Time	매직타임	Yes	Yes	2007	
2000	Leave When They're Applauding	박수칠 때 떠나라	Yes	Yes	Adapted into 2005 film Murder, Take One	
2002	Welcome to Dongmakgol	웰컴 투 동막골	Yes	Yes	Adapted into 2005 film Welcome to Dongmakgol	
2004	Return to Hamlet	리턴 투 햄릿	Yes	Yes	2011, 2012	
2005	Death of a Salesman	세일즈맨의 죽음	Yes	No	2012	
2011	Romeo Landing on Earth	로미오 지구 착륙기	Yes	Yes		
2016	Flower of Secret	꽃의 비밀	Yes	Yes	2019	
2016	Ice	얼음	Yes	Yes	2021	

=== Musical ===
Musical play(s) credits
Year	Title		Credited as		Restage	Ref.
Year	English	Korean	Director	Playwright	Restage	Ref.
1999	Beautiful autographs - delightful chatter of women who committed suicide!	아름다운 사인(死因) - 자살한 여인들의 유쾌한 수다!	Yes	Yes		
2013	December: Unfinished Song	디셈버: 끝나지 않은 노래	Yes	Yes	2014	

== Scriptbook ==
Published scriptbook
Year	Title		Author	Publisher	Published Date	ISBN
Year	English	Korean	Author	Publisher	Published Date	ISBN
2008	Jangjin's collection of plays	장진 희곡집	Jang Jin	Yeoeumsa	2008.01.15	978-8-9742-7231-9
2008	Jangjin Scenario Book	장진 시나리오집	Jang Jin	Yeoeumsa	2008.07.10	978-8-9742-7232-6
2012	Welcome to Dongmakgol	웰컴 투 동막골	Jang Jin	Communication Books	2012.12.21	978-8-9668-0115-2
2012	Knowledgable Woman	아는 여자	Jang Jin	Communication Books	2012.12.31	978-8-9668-0130-5

== Recurring cast members ==
Jang frequently re-casts actors whom he has worked with on previous films.

Recurring cast members in Jang Jin's works
Actor Work	Cha Seung-won	Im Ha-ryong	Im Won-hee	Jang Young-nam	Joo Jin-mo	Jung Jae-young	Kim Byeong-ok	Kim Won-hae	Lee Soon-jae	Lee Yong-yi	Shin Goo	Shin Ha-kyun	Ryu Deok-hwan	Ryu Seung-ryong
Theater
Taxi Driver				check		check				check		check		
Welcome to Dongmakgol				check		check				check		check		
Clumsy People				check								check		check
Leave When They're Applauding														check
Short film
No Comment			check			check				check		check	check	
Film
The Happening			check			check						check		
The Spy												check		
Guns & Talks			check			check						check		
A Man Who Went to Mars												check		
Someone Special		check		check		check								check
Murder, Take One	check					check				check		check		check
Welcome to Dongmakgol		check				check				check		check	check	
Righteous Ties				check	check	check					check			check
My Son	check			check								check	check	
Going by the Book					check	check					check			
Public Enemy Returns						check								
Good Morning, President		check		check	check			check	check	check				check
The Quiz Show Scandal			check	check			check	check				check	check	check
The Recipe														check
Romantic Heaven			check				check	check	check		check			
Man on High Heels	check						check	check						

== Other activities ==
- 2012 17th Incheon Asian Games Opening and Closing Ceremony General Director
- 2013 Incheon Indoor Martial Arts Asian Games General Director
- 2010 Public Relations Ambassador for the 29th International Contemporary Dance Festival
- CEO of Digital Suda (Film It Suda)

== Accolades ==
=== Awards and nominations ===
Awards and nominations of Jang
Year	Award	Category	Recipient	Result	Ref.
1995	Chosun Ilbo New Year's Literary Contest	Best Screenplay Theater	Cheonho-dong Gusa Street	Won	
2000	36th Baeksang Arts Awards	Best Screenplay	The Spy	Won	
2004	5th Busan Film Critics Awards	Best Screenplay	Someone Special	Won	
2005	26th Blue Dragon Film Awards	Best Film	Welcome to Dongmakgol	Nominated	
2005	26th Blue Dragon Film Awards	Audience Choice Award for Most Popular Film	Welcome to Dongmakgol	Won	
2005	26th Blue Dragon Film Awards	Best Screenplay	Welcome to Dongmakgol	Nominated (Note: Jang Jin, Park Kwang-hyun, Kim Joong)	
2005	4th Korean Film Awards	Best Film	Welcome to Dongmakgol	Won	
2005	4th Korean Film Awards	Best Screenplay	Welcome to Dongmakgol	Won	
2006	43rd Grand Bell Awards	Best Film	Welcome to Dongmakgol	Nominated	
2006	43rd Grand Bell Awards	Best Screenplay	Welcome to Dongmakgol	Nominated	
2006	43rd Grand Bell Awards	Best Planning	Welcome to Dongmakgol	Nominated (Note: Film Suda)	
2006	3rd Max Movie Awards	Best Film	Welcome to Dongmakgol	Won	
2009	Baeksang Arts Awards	Best Screenplay	Public Enemy Returns	Nominated	
2009	2009 MBC Drama Awards	Special Award for Radio Show Segment	Standard FM Radio Book Club	Won	
2009	5th Korea Green Foundation's People Who Brightened Our World	Person of the Year	Jang Jin	Won	
2012	30th Blue Dragon Film Awards	Best Film	Good Morning President	Nominated	
2012	30th Blue Dragon Film Awards	Best Director	Good Morning President	Nominated	
2012	30th Fajr International Film Festival International Cinema Competition (Eastern Vista, Asian Cinema)	Crystal Simorgh for Best Screenplay	Romantic Heaven	Won	
2014	Seoul Institute of the Arts Alumni Association	Light of Life Award	Jang Jin	Won	
2016	8th Festival International Du Film Policier Du Beaune	Grand Prix	Man on High Heels	Won	
2016	8th Festival International Du Film Policier Du Beaune	Critics' Award	Man on High Heels	Won	

=== Listicles ===
Name of publisher, year listed, name of listicle, and placement
Publisher	Year	Listicle	Placement	Ref.
Cine21	2006	Chungmuro 50 Power Filmmaker	25th	
Cine21	2007	Chungmuro 50 Power Filmmaker	50th	

== See also ==
- List of Korean film directors
- Cinema of Korea
