= Romantic Heaven =

- Theatrical release poster
- Hangul: 로맨틱 헤븐
- RR: Romaentik hebeun
- MR: Romaent'ik hebŭn
- Directed by: Jang Jin
- Written by: Jang Jin
- Produced by: Kang Woo-suk
- Starring: Kim Soo-ro; Kim Dong-wook; Kim Ji-won
- Cinematography: Kim Jun-young
- Edited by: So Ran
- Music by: Lee Byung-woo
- Distributed by: Cinema Service
- Release date: March 24, 2011
- Running time: 117 minutes
- Country: South Korea
- Language: Korean
- Box office: US$488,024

Romantic Heaven (Korean: 로맨틱 헤븐) is a 2011 South Korean romantic drama film about fate, love, loss, and redemption.

Though the premise is sentimental, dealing with a variety of characters and their relationships in both life and the afterlife, it is very much in line with writer-director Jang Jin's previous works, combining elements of several different genres, including romance, comedy, drama, ghost and even police thriller into an eccentric, playful and imaginative film.

== Plot ==
Three seemingly disconnected people cross paths at a hospital: Part one, "Mom," focuses on the character of Mimi, whose mother is battling cancer, and needs a bone marrow transplant if she is to have any hope of surviving. With great difficulty, doctors identify a potential donor, but then the man goes into flight after being accused of murder. Hoping to find him, Mimi becomes acquainted with the police detectives assigned to his case. Part two, "Wife," concerns a lawyer named Min-gyu who has recently lost his spouse. Amidst his grief, he is distracted by the fact that he can't find a bag that she had brought with her to the hospital, and which contained her personal diary. In the meantime, he is visited by an ex-convict who has a score to settle. Part three, "Girl," focuses on Ji-wook, a taxi driver whose grandfather is on the verge of death. One day his grandmother tells him that for all of his life, her husband has been unable to forget a young woman he met in his youth. It is in part four, "Romantic Heaven," that the various threads are brought together and ultimately resolved. As fate would have it, their counterparts are gazing down upon their loved ones from heaven, dealing with their own version of remorse and regret.

== Cast ==
- Kim Soo-ro as Song Min-gyu
- Kim Dong-wook as Dong Ji-wook
- Kim Ji-won as Choi Mimi
- Lee Soon-jae as old man (God)
- Shim Eun-kyung as Kim Boon as a girl
- Im Won-hee as Detective Kim
- Kim Won-hae as Detective Park
- Lee Han-wi as Peter, the secretary
- Jeon Yang-ja as grandma
- Kim Dong-joo as Mimi's mother
- Lee Moon-soo as Ha-yeon's father
- Kim Byung-ok as manhole man
- Kim Jun-bae as Jang Heo-soo
- Lee Yong-yi as Kim Boon as an old woman
- Kim Jae-gun as old man
- Lee Chul-min as Eung-shik
- Lee Na-ra as Yoon-joo
- Jung Gyu-soo as Ji-wook's doctor
- Lee Jae-yong as Mimi's doctor
- Kim Il-woong as Lee Kang-shik
- Seo Joo-ae as Park Joon-hee
- Lee Sang-hoon as deputy director of taxi company
- Kim Do-yeon as Person from heaven
- Kong Ho-seok as judge
- Yoo Sun as Yeom Kyeong-ja (cameo)
- Han Jae-suk as stalker (cameo)
- Kim Mu-yeol as Dong Chi-sung (cameo)

== Awards ==
Name of the award ceremony, year presented, category, recipient of the award and the result of the nomination
Award	Year	Category	Recipient	Result	Ref.
30th Fajr International Film Festival International Cinema Competition (Eastern Vista, Asian Cinema)	2012	Crystal Simorgh for Best Screenplay	Romantic Heaven	Won	
