= The Quiz Show Scandal =

- Film poster
- Hangul: 퀴즈왕
- Hanja: 퀴즈王
- RR: Kwijeuwang
- MR: K'wijŭwang
- Directed by: Jang Jin
- Screenplay by: Jang Jin
- Produced by: Lee Taek-dong; Jang Jin; Kim Seong-jin; Jo Hyeon-seok
- Starring: Kim Soo-ro; Han Jae-suk; Song Young-chang; Jang Young-nam; Ryu Seung-ryong; Lee Hae-yeong; Shim Eun-kyung; Lee Ji-yong
- Cinematography: Kim Jun-young
- Music by: Yoon Soo-jin
- Distributed by: Cinema Service
- Release date: September 16, 2010
- Running time: 121 minutes
- Country: South Korea
- Language: Korean

The Quiz Show Scandal (Korean: 퀴즈왕; RR: Kwijeuwang; lit. 'Quiz King') is a 2010 South Korean film. The ensemble comedy satire is written and directed by Jang Jin.

At a police station, people involved in a car accident are accidentally informed of the answer to the last question of a quiz show with a prize of over ten million dollars. On the day of the show, those same people gather again to compete against each other but they only know the answer to the last question. Who is going to win the fortune?

== Plot ==
Four cars are caught up in a pile-up on the Gangbyeon Expressway into Seoul one night when a young woman, Im Yeon-yi, seemingly throws herself into the traffic. In the first car are Do Ho-man (Song Young-chang), whose wife is in a coma in hospital, and his cockily brilliant student son, Ji-yong (Lee Ji-yong); in the second are a gambling-addicted husband, Kim Sang-do (Ryu Seung-ryong), his nagging wife Jang Pal-nyeo (Jang Young-nam) and their young daughter; in the third are two gangsters, Lee Do-yeob (Kim Soo-ro) and Park Sang-gil (Han Jae-suk), who will "fix" anything for money; and in the last car are four members of a depression-therapy group - club president Kim Jeong-sang (Kim Byeong-ok), high-school student Kim Yeo-na (Shim Eun-kyung), French teacher Lee Sang-hoon (Lee Sang-hoon) and a mobile phone salesman (Lee Moon-soo). They are all taken to Yongsan police station to sort out what happened, and are joined by others brought in for questioning, including restaurant delivery boy Oh Cheol-ju (Ryu Deok-hwan) and a drunk, Lee Jun-sang (Im Won-hee). Everyone in the room learns that the dead woman set questions for the big-money TV program Quiz Show and that a memory stick in her bag contains the answer to the final question for next month's show. No one has ever succeeded in answering all 30 questions because of the legendary difficulty of the final one: the show's accumulated pot is currently US$10 million. They all hurriedly brush up their general knowledge to apply to take part in the show, and by the night in question the pot has climbed to US$13.5 million. What they don't realize, as the show goes to air live, is that the organizers are running their own private scam, and Lee Do-yeob has decided to "fix" things his own way.

== Cast ==
=== Main cast ===
- Kim Soo-ro - Lee Do-yeob, the older gangster
- Han Jae-suk - Park Sang-gil, the younger gangster
- Song Young-chang - Do Ho-man
- Jang Young-nam - Jang Pal-nyeo, Kim Sang-do's nagging wife
- Ryu Seung-ryong - Kim Sang-do, the addictive gambler
- Lee Ji-yong - Do Ji-yong, the know-it-all son
- Ryu Deok-hwan - Oh Cheol-ju, the Chinese restaurant delivery boy
- Lee Hae-yeong - Choi Ha-yeong, the quiz host
- Kim Byeong-ok - Kim Jeong-sang, the depression club's president
- Lee Sang-hoon - Lee Sang-hoon, the French teacher
- Lee Moon-soo - the mobile phone salesman
- Shim Eun-kyung - Kim Yeo-na, the depressive schoolgirl, aka "ShootMePlz"
- Im Won-hee - Lee Jun-sang, the drunk
- Jung Jae-young - Dong Chi-seng, the judo man (cameo)
- Shin Ha-kyun - the Ph.D in engineering (cameo)
- Go Eun-mi - Im Yeon-yi, the dead woman (cameo)

=== Supporting cast ===
- Lee Su-yeong - the radio singer
- Gong Ho-seok - Officer Gong
- Kim Won-hae - Officer Kim
- Kim Il-woong - Officer Choi
- Han Seung-hee - Officer Han
- Park Jeong-gi - Officer Park
- Kim Dae-ryung - Kim
- Park Jun-seo - Park
- Kim Jae-geon - TV station general manager
- Jo Deok-hyeon - TV director
- Lee Cheol-min - academic
- Jung Gyu-soo - academic
- Lee Jae-yong - academic
- Lee Han-wi - Kim, a businessman
- Jang Jin - Chief Inspector Ma
- Park Geon-il as Kim
- Kim Ji-yeong - female quiz show questioner
- Bae Seong-il - male quiz show questioner
- Lee Su-bin - Kim Sang-do's daughter
- Lee Seon-hye - Park Pil-rye, the prostitute
- Shin Hyeon-suk - wife
- Yu Hee-seok - TV director's female assistant
- Ahn Jang-hun - quiz show audition examiner
- Shin Gyeong-in - TV weather girl
- Ahn Min-yeong - group member
- Lee Jong-pil - group member
- Kim Mi-suk - man's wife
- Kim Shi-gweon - biker
- Kim Bang-yul - bikers
- Han Eul-hee - assistant producer
- Han Su-jin - Choi Ha-yeong's woman
- Kim Jun-yeong - French translator
- Lee Dae-seung - Do Ji-yong's teacher
- Park Sang-yeong - Kim Yeo-na's teacher
- Seo Ji-won - Kim Yeo-na's friend
- Kim Chan-yi - detective
- Go Seong-il - quiz show host on TV set
- Lee Sang-il - Kim Jun-mo
- Son Yeol-jun - quiz show competitor on TV set
- Jang Yong-bok - quiz show competitor on TV set
- Kim Hae-ju - quiz show competitor on TV set
- Yun Ju-man - quiz show competitor on TV set
- Lee Geon-woo - quiz show competitor on TV set
- Kim Jeong-gyo - quiz show competitor on TV set
- Han Sang-gu - quiz show competitor on TV set
- Kim Yong-gu - quiz show competitor on TV set
- Jeong Seon-hye - quiz show competitor on TV set
- Son Mun-sun - quiz show competitor on TV set
- Kim Ji-seok - quiz show competitor on TV set
- Kim Seon-chan - quiz show competitor on TV set
- Lee Tae-woong - quiz show competitor on TV set
- Kim Jae-ho - quiz show competitor on TV set
- Hong Hyeon-cheol - quiz show competitor on TV set
- Kim Ji-gyeong - quiz show competitor on TV set
