= My Son (2007 film) =

South Korean film by Jang Jin

- Theatrical poster
- Hangul: 아들
- RR: Adeul
- MR: Adŭl
- Directed by: Jang Jin
- Written by: Jang Jin
- Produced by: Kang Woo-suk; Lee Eun-ha
- Starring: Cha Seung-won; Ryu Deok-hwan
- Cinematography: Choi Sang-ho
- Edited by: Kim Sang-bum; Kim Jae-bum
- Music by: Lee Byung-woo
- Distributed by: Cinema Service
- Release date: May 1, 2007
- Running time: 103 minutes
- Country: South Korea
- Language: Korean

My Son (Korean: 아들; RR: Adeul) is a 2007 South Korean drama film written and directed by Jang Jin, starring Cha Seung-won and Ryu Deok-hwan. For his performance, Cha won Best Actor at the 15th Chunsa Film Art Awards in 2007.

Alternate titles are A Day with My Son and One Day with My Son.

== Plot ==
Lee Gang-sik (Cha Seung-won) is serving a life sentence for robbery and murder. For the last 15 years, he has been on his best behavior, and now his wish has finally come true. Gang-sik has been granted a one-day leave to visit his family, and as the day draws closer and closer, he is overcome with both excitement and nervousness. There is so much he wants to say to his eighteen-year-old son Jun-seok (Ryu Deok-hwan), whom he hasn't seen since incarceration when the boy was three years old, but the feeling isn't exactly reciprocated. Forced to grow up at an early age, his son has had a tough life, taking care of his elderly grandmother with dementia on his own, and in his eyes, he sees not a father, but a stranger, a criminal. How can Gang-sik make up for 15 years with just one day's time? But the father's genuine feelings gradually open his son's heart. To enjoy every second given to them, the father and son hang out together all night until they must once again part ways the next morning.

== Cast ==
- Cha Seung-won as Lee Gang-sik
- Ryu Deok-hwan as Lee Jun-seok
- Kim Ji-young as Gang-sik's mother
- Lee Sang-hoon as Prison officer Park
- Lee Mun-su as Warden
- Lee Han-wi as Priest
- Kong Ho-suk as Prisoner
- Lee Chul-min as Prisoner
- Jin Won as Jin-seok
- Kim Yoon-hye as Mimi
- Seo Woo as Yeo-il
- Jang Young-nam as Corrections officer
- Jang Jae-seok
- Kim Hak-gyu
- Bae Seong-il
- Kim Hyun-joon as Correction Officer
- Jung Jae-young as Father goose (voice cameo)
- Yoon Yoo-sun as Mother goose (voice cameo)
- Gong Hyo-jin as Daughter goose (voice cameo)
- Shin Ha-kyun as Uncle goose (voice cameo)
- Yoo Hae-jin as Man next door (voice cameo)
