= Man on High Heels =

- Film poster
- Directed by: Jang Jin
- Written by: Jang Jin
- Produced by: Jang Jin
- Starring: Cha Seung-won; Oh Jung-se; Esom; Kim Eung-soo; Ahn Gil-kang; Ko Kyung-pyo
- Cinematography: Lee Seong-jae
- Edited by: Jang Jin; Yang Dong-yeop
- Music by: Kim Jung-woo
- Production companies: Jangcha & Co.
- Distributed by: Lotte Entertainment
- Release date: June 4, 2014
- Running time: 124 minutes
- Country: South Korea
- Language: Korean
- Box office: US$2.5 million

Man on High Heels (Korean: 하이힐; RR: Haihil; lit. 'High Heel') is a 2014 South Korean neo-noir action thriller film written and directed by Jang Jin, starring Cha Seung-won as a transgender homicide detective.

== Plot ==
Yoon Ji-wook is a hard-as-nails homicide detective known for his undisputed ability to nab violent criminals. He is revered as a legend in the police force and at the same time feared among the mafia for his brutality in cracking down on crime. Yet, beneath his cool, macho appearance lies a secret that he must hide from the world he lives in. Ji-wook was born male, and he has wanted to live his life as a woman since his teenage years. He tries to suppress this inner desire, but in vain. Ji-wook finally reaches the point where he can no longer hide who he truly is, and decides to take the plunge and get a gender affirmation operation. However, before he has a chance to do so, unexpected crises arise and interfere with his plans. A gang that suffered from the cold, hard steel of Ji-wook's handcuffs is dead set on getting their revenge against him. Ji-wook resigns and tries to go about making his dream a reality, but people close to him get sucked into the revenge plot he finds himself at the center of. When some of those people get killed and a girl named Jang-mi falls into danger, he realizes that he can't stand idly by any longer.

== Cast ==
- Cha Seung-won as Yoon Ji-wook
- Oh Jung-se as Heo Gon
- Esom as Jang-mi
- Song Young-chang as Heo Bul
- Kim Eung-soo as Squad leader Park
- Ahn Gil-kang as Master Park
- Ko Kyung-pyo as Kim Jin-woo
- Lee Yong-nyeo as Bada
- Lee El as Do Do
- Kim Min-kyo as Man 1
- Min Jun-ho as accountant
- Kim Ye-won as Jung Yoo-ri
- Lee Eon-jeong as Joo-yeon
- Oh Ji-ho as Lee Seok
- Park Sung-woong as Prosecutor Hong
- Yoon Son-ha as Jung Yoo-jung
- Lee Moon-soo as taxi driver
- Kim Byeong-ok as Dr. Jin
- Lee Hae-young as immigration staff member
- Kim Won-hae as elevator resident
- Lee Dong Gil as young Jiwook

== Box office ==
Man on High Heels was released in South Korea on June 4, 2014. Despite its star director and actor, the film underperformed at the box office against Hollywood blockbusters X-Men: Days of Future Past and Edge of Tomorrow. It opened at sixth place on the box office, drawing 338,663 admissions.

== Awards ==
Name of the award ceremony, year presented, category, recipient of the award and the result of the nomination
Award	Year	Category	Recipient	Result	Ref.
8th Festival International Du Film Policier Du Beaune	2016	Grand Prix	Man on High Heels	Won	
