= Im Won-hee =

South Korean actor (born 1970)

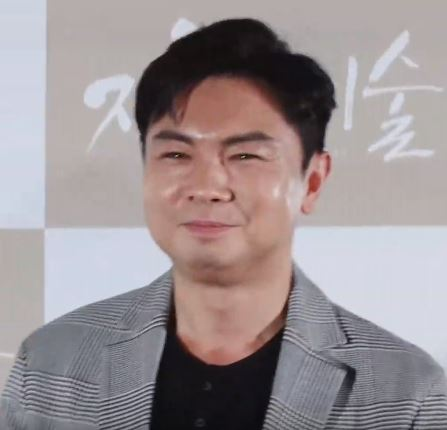
- Im in September 2019
- Born: October 11, 1970 (age 56); Suyu-dong, Gangbuk District, Seoul, South Korea
- Occupation: Actor
- Years active: 1995–present
- Agent: Gen Stars

Korean name
- Hangul: 임원희
- RR: Im Wonhui
- MR: Im Wŏnhŭi

Im Won-hee (Korean: 임원희; born October 11, 1970) is a South Korean actor. Im was an alumnus of the legendary Daehak-ro theater troupe Mokhwa (목화), starring in many of Jang Jin's stage plays. He made his film debut in Jang's black comedy The Happenings in 1998, and through the years has become one of the most versatile supporting actors in Korean cinema, with notable roles in Three... Extremes and Le Grand Chef. But Im is best known for his iconic role Dachimawa Lee, which began in 2000 as the title character of a 35-minute short film that director Ryoo Seung-wan made as a parody/homage to '70s Korean genre action films. The internet short was enormously popular and received more than a million page views, and in 2008, Ryoo again cast Im in an action-comedy feature film based on the same character, Dachimawa Lee.

== Filmography ==
Key
†	Denotes films that have not yet been released

=== Film ===
Year	Title	Role	Notes/Ref.
1998	The Happenings	gangster 1	
1999	The Spy	taxi hijacker 3	
2000	Die Bad	Detective Lee	
2000	Dachimawa Lee	Dachimawa Lee	short film
2000	Taxi of Terror	policeman 1	
2000	Coming Out	tutor	short film
2001	Guns & Talks	priest	
2001	This Is Law	Bong Soo-chul	
2002	No Blood No Tears	Haepari ("jellyfish")	
2002	Fun Movie	Hwangbo	
2002	No Comment	theater exam taker / national assembly member 1	
2003	Silmido	Won-hee	
2004	Three... Extremes	intruder	short film
2004	Lovely Rivals	man in TV drama	cameo
2005	Crying Fist	Won-tae	
2007	Happy Killing	Du-chan	
2007	Punch Strike	Kwang-gyun	
2007	M	Sung-woo	
2007	Le Grand Chef	Bong-joo	
2008	Dachimawa Lee	Dachimawa Lee	
2009	Short! Short! Short! 2009: Show Me the Money		short film "Neo Liberal Man"
2010	Miss Staff Sergeant	Wang Jong-pal	
2010	A Barefoot Dream	Director Poong	
2010	The Quiz Show Scandal	Lee Joon-sang	
2011	Romantic Heaven	Detective Kim	
2011	Officer of the Year	PhD Ko	
2011	Mr. Idol	Park Sang-shik	
2012	I Am the King	Hae-goo	
2013	Happiness for Sale	man at city hall stealing coins	cameo
2013	Rockin' on Heaven's Door	Bong-shik	
2013	Horror Stories 2	teacher	short film "The Escape"
2013	My Dear Girl, Jin-young	gynecologist	cameo
2015	Makgeolli Girls	Jang-ddol	
2015	Three Summer Nights	Dal-soo	
2015	The Advocate: A Missing Body	Office manager Park	
2017	Along With the Gods: The Two Worlds	Judge	
2018	Snatch Up	Loan shark Baek	
2018	Along with the Gods: The Last 49 Days	Judge	
2018	Passing Summer	Jung-bong	
2019	The Skill of Remarriage	Kyung Ho	
2019	Forbidden Dream	Im Hyo-don	
2020	Collectors	Sabdari / Shovel Leg	
2022	Reverse	Sang Ho	Sound film
2024	Handsome Guys	Lee Won-hee	Special appearance

=== Television series ===
Year	Title	Role	Notes/Ref.
2006	Coma	Detective Choi	
2010	Legend of the Patriots	Kim Joon-beom	
2011	Drama Special: Lethal Move	Jong-man	
2012	Salamander Guru and The Shadows	Won-sam	
2012	Syndrome	Oh Gwang-hee	
2013	Dating Agency: Cyrano	Kim Chul-soo	cameo, ep 10–12
2014	You're All Surrounded	Cha Tae-ho	
2016–2023	Dr. Romantic	Jang Gi-tae	Season 1–3
2016–2017	The Legend of the Blue Sea	Doctor	cameo, ep 19
2017	Strong Girl Bong-soon	Baek Soo-tak	
2017	Drama Stage: History of Walking Upright	Mi-Na's father	
2018	Where Stars Land	gift shop employee	cameo, ep 17
2018	Wok of Love	Wang Chun-soo	
2018	Room No. 9	Bang Sang-soo	
2019	Chief of Staff	Go Seok-man	Season 1–2
2019	Melting Me Softly	Son Hyun-ki	
2020	Drama Special: Modern Girl	viscount	
2021	Dark Hole	Park Soon-il	
2021	Move to Heaven	Oh Hyun-chang	
2021	So Not Worth It	Mr. Crane	cameo, ep 4
2021	The Witch's Diner	Goo Hyo-sik	cameo
2021–2022	Moonshine	Hwang So-yoo	
2022	Crazy Love	Park Tae-yang	
2022	From Now On, Showtime!	God of heaven	cameo, ep 16
2026	Reverse †		

=== Variety shows ===
Year	Title	Role
2013	Gag Concert "Discoveries in Life" sketch	
2013–2014	Law of the Jungle in Micronesia	Cast member
2014	Law of the Jungle in Borneo	Cast member
2014	I Am a Man	Cast member
2015	Real Men – Season 2	Cast member
2018–present	My Little Old Boy	Cast member
2021–present	Dolsing Fourmen	Host

== Theater ==
- Rain Man (2009) – Raymond Babbitt
- Leave When They're Applauding (2000)
- Heotang (1999)
- Taxi Driver (1997)
- Romeo and Juliet (1995)

== Awards and nominations ==
Name of the award ceremony, year presented, category, nominee of the award, and the result of the nomination
Award ceremony	Year	Category	Nominee / Work	Result	Ref.
Blue Dragon Film Awards	2008	Best Supporting Actor	Le Grand Chef	Nominated	
SBS Drama Awards	2016	Special Award, Actor in a Genre Drama	Dr. Romantic	Nominated	
SBS Drama Awards	2018	Best Supporting Actor	Wok of Love	Won	
SBS Entertainment Awards	2018	Best Entertainer Award	My Little Old Boy	Won	
SBS Entertainment Awards	2020	Best Couple Award with Jung Suk-yong	My Little Old Boy	Won	
SBS Entertainment Awards	2021	Grand Prize (Daesang) (Note: with Shin Dong-yup, Seo Jang-hoon, Cho Hye-seon, Kim Sun-ja, Park Young-hye, Lee Sang-min, Tak Jae-hoon, Kim Joon-ho, Kim Jong-kook, Kim Hee-chul, Lee Tae-sung, Oh Min-suk, Park Goon, Choi Jin-hyuk)	My Little Old Boy	Won	
SBS Entertainment Awards	2021	Excellence Award in Talk/ Variety Category	My Little Old Boy, Dolsing Fourmen	Won	
SBS Entertainment Awards	2022	Scene Stealer Award	My Little Old Boy, Dolsing Fourmen	Won	
