= Somethin' Special =

Somethin' Special may refer to:

- Somethin' Special (album), a 1962 album by Richard Holmes and Les McCann
- "Somethin' Special" (song), a 2008 song by Colbie Caillat

== See also ==
- Something Special (disambiguation)
