= Lee Yong-yi =

South Korean actress (born 1958)

- 이용이
- Born: July 30, 1958 (age 68); Seoul, South Korea
- Other name: Lee Yong-ee
- Education: Seoul Institute of the Arts
- Occupations: Television actress; theater actress; Folk song singer
- Years active: 1979–present
- Agent: High Entertainment
- Spouse: Kim Il-woo
- Relatives: Lee Da-geun (brother)

Korean name
- Hangul: 이용이
- Hanja: 李龍伊
- RR: I Yongi
- MR: I Yongi
- Website: highentfamily.com/lee-yong-i

Lee Yong-yi (Korean: 이용이; born July 30, 1958) is a South Korean actress active in theater, television, and film. She is widely recognized for her portrayal of Nomo in both the stage and film versions of Welcome to Dongmakgol (2005) and for her role in the tvN series Hometown Cha-Cha-Cha (2021).

== Career ==
=== Early theater and stage work ===
After graduating from the Seoul Institute of the Arts in 1979, Lee debuted with the Theatre Company Minye (Note: Theatre Company Minye (민예극장; 民藝劇場;Folk Craft Theatre) is theater company founded in Seoul in 1973 for the purpose of respecting humanity through plays and modern acceptance of traditional plays. The theater company Minye is an abbreviation of 'National Theater of Performing Arts'. The folk craft theater's acceptance of traditional arts had a great influence on plays in the 1970s, and formed a flow in Korean theater, such as inserting mask dances or spears into modern plays, and finding materials in folktales and shamanism.) in a production of Heinrich von Kleist's The Broken Jug. In 1986, she joined the joined Theater Company Michu, (Note: Theatre Company Michu (극단 미추; 美醜) was founded in August 1986 by Son Jin-chaek. The theater company Michu originated with the 'Son Jinchaek Directing Lab', which established when CEO Son Jin-chaek was the representative of the Minye Theater. Michu continues to search for the identity of Korean theater that emphasizes spirit rather than form . Since 1987, Michu has performed Madangnori works every year. Madangnori refers to traditional Korean theater that combines various forms of folk entertainment, such as puppetry, mask dances and traditional percussion music.) where she appeared in several significant productions. Her notable stage credits include the role of Hyeong-bang in Madangnori Chunhyangjeon (1987–1992) and King Bang Sook in Dung Dung Nakrang Dung, performed at the Seoul Arts Center in 1996.

In 1995, Lee was cast as Gwibone in play That Woman's Novel, adapted from the novel Little Grandmother! by playwright Um In-hee. It was a refinement of a work published in 1989 by the writer Um In-hee in Another Cultural 3rd Collection. The play, directed by Kang Young-geol, was performed at the 19th Seoul Theater Festival in June 1995 at the Arts Center Small Theater. Lee received the 19th Seoul Theater Festival Female Acting Award for her portrayal.

=== Film and television ===
Lee made her cinematic debut in Park Kwang-soo's 1993 film I Want to Go to That Island. In the film, she portrayed Ne Eop-sun, a shaman, appearing alongside her real-life husband, actor Kim Il-woo, who played the character's spouse.

In 1998, Lee assumed leadership of the theater company Hyun Bin, which was founded by her husband. The company's inaugural production was an adaptation of Lee Moon-yeol's novel Choice.

Since 2017, Lee has been under an exclusive contract with Liyan Entertainment. She later transferred to High Entertainment.

== Other activities ==
Beyond acting, Lee is trained in Gyeonggi folk songs, having studied under the pansori master Ahn Bok-sik (1926–1997). (Note: Gyeonggi folk song refers to all folk songs handed down in Seoul and Gyeonggi Province. However, Gyeonggi folk songs designated as important intangible cultural assets refer to 'Gyeonggi Ginjapga' called 'Gyeonggi jwachang'. Gyeonggi Folk Song' was designated as Important Intangible Cultural Heritage No. 57 on July 12, 1975. As the first entertainers, Ahn Bok-sik (stage name Ahn Bi-chwi), Lee Gyeong-ok (李瓊玉, stage name Muk Gye-wol), and Lee Yun-ran (李潤蘭, stage name Lee Eun-ju) were recognized as the first entertainers.) She has also contributed to arts education as a lecturer on music and acting at the Sungkyunkwan University Social Education Center.

== Personal life ==
Lee was married to the late actor and theater director Kim Il-woo. The couple met while attending the Seoul Institute of the Arts, where Kim was her senior in the theater department. They had two children together. Kim died in 2004 following a diagnosis of stomach cancer.

Lee's older brother, Lee Dae-geun, is also a professional actor. His career includes roles in the political dramas The Third Republic and The Fourth Republic. He has retired from the entertainment industry after his performance in the series Fermented Family.

== Filmography ==
=== Film ===
Year	Title	Role	Ref.
1993	I Want to Go to That Island		
1997	Barricade	mother	
1998	Hyun Bin		
2000	Bongja	kimbap restaurant owner	
2002	Don't Ask Family My Nike	mother	
2004	Bride Lessons	Super Grandmother	
2005	The Big Family	Soon-Im	
2005	Welcome to Dongmakgol	Nomo	
2005	Leave when you applaud	shaman	
2006	The Elegant World	old woman	
2006	Son's Things	Grandmother	
2006	Righteous Ties	Chi Seong-mo	
2007	The Miracle of 1st Avenue	Seon Joo Mo	
2007	Shadows in the Palace	Cheon Sang-gung	
2007	Let's Live Right	Do Man Mo	
2008	Little Prince	Sister Director	
2008	Our School E.T.	Mo Eun-sil	
2008	I Need Courage		
2008	Accompanying	mother	
2008	Mundi	mother	
2009	Good Morning President	Nomo	
2009	Operation	Hyun Soo-mo	
2009	Chungdam Bodhisattva	Seung Wono	
2009	Bean Pods in My Eyes	Sojoo Mo	
2010	How to travel with a cow	mother of choice	
2011	Romantic Heaven	old man Kim Boon In	
2011	Mr. Idol	Rikimo	
2011	The Guitar Laughs	Lee Gap-soon	
2011	Bob, Sang	mother	
2013	The Five	Jeong Ha-mo	
2013	Perfectly Precious Love	Sarang Grandmother	
2014	The Tenor – Lirico Spinto	Bae Jae-cheol's mother	
2015	C'est Si Bon	aunt	
2015	Salt Star		
2015	Barter Exchange		
2016	Missing: The Missing Woman	a caregiver grandmother	
2017	Fabricated City	So Hyeon-Jeong Mo (voice)	
2017	A Taxi Driver	Hong Yong-pyo Mo	
2018	Herstory	a grandmother Yu, Inuk	
2018	Whisper Whisper		
2019	Jurors 8	Kang Doo-shik Mother	
2019	Let Us Meet Now Hello -	Youngshin	
2019	Long Live the King-	Mokpo Restaurant owner's grandmother (special appearance)	
2019	The Missing Woman	Tazza Grandma	
2020	The Day I Died: Unclosed Case	Grandmother Hwang	
2021	Angels Are Viruses	Grandmother on Knees	
2024	The Firefighters	Shin Yong-tae's mother	

=== Television series ===
Year	Title	Role	Notes	Ref.
2002	Pure Youth Park Jong-cheol	Jong-cheol's mother		
2004	Tell Me That You Love Me	Governor		
2007	New Heart	Patient	Cameo	
2009	Temptation of an Angel	the director of a nursery school		
2012	A Gentleman's Dignity	Lee Mi-kyung		
2013	Prime Minister & I	Lee Dal-ja		
2013	The Eldest	wife of the village mayor	Cameo	
2014	You're All Surrounded	owner of a food stall	Cameo	
2014	Endless Love	Mrs. Ahn		
2014	Sweden Laundry	Grandmother		
2014	Tears of Heaven	Yoon Eun-ja		
2015	Warm and Cozy	Noh Bok-nyeo, haenyeo of Sorang Town		
2015	My Fantastic Funeral	grandmother living upstairs		
2015	It's Okay Because I am a Mom	Cha Ye-soon	TV movie	
2015	Bubble Gum	patient		
2015	Sweet and Bloody Family			
2016	My Lawyer, Mr. Jo	Mal-sook		
2016	Uncontrollably Fond			
2016	Drinking Solo	Min Jin-woong's mother, Kim Mi-kyung		
2016	Dr. Romantic	mother of a patient who came in after drinking pesticides		
2017	Ms. Perfect	Goo Jung-hee's mother		
2017–2018	A Korean Odyssey	Jin Seon-mi's grandmother		
2018	Sunny Again Tomorrow	Hwang Dong-seok's mother		
2018	My Only One	Geum-ok		
2018	The Ghost Detective	Seon Woo-hye's mother		
2019	Chocolate	Sookja's grandmother		
2019	Chief of Staff	Yu's Grandmother		
2019	When My Love Blooms	convenience store owner		
2021	Hometown Cha-Cha-Cha	Lee Mat-yi		
2021–2022	Let Me Be Your Knight	Chorong		
2022	The Veil	Lee Choon-gil's aunt		

== Stage ==
=== Hyunbin Troupe ===
Theater play performances with Hyunbin Troupe
Year	Title		Role	Theater	Date	Notes/Ref.
Year	English	Korean	Role	Theater	Date	Notes/Ref.
1998	(1998) Seoul International Theater Festival, Choice	(1998) 서울국제연극제-선택	Manshin, a female shaman	Arts and Culture Center	August 31 – October 15	
1998–1999	Choice - Lee Yong-yi Goodnori Play	선택 - 이용이 굿놀이 연극	Manshin, a female shaman	Hakjeon Blue Small Theater	June 9 – February 21	
1998–1999	Choice - Lee Yong-yi Goodnori Play	선택 - 이용이 굿놀이 연극	Manshin, a female shaman	Daehakro Theater	November 26 – January 10	
1999	Choice - Lee Yong-yi Goodnori Play	선택 - 이용이 굿놀이 연극	Manshin, a female shaman	Arts and Culture Center Small Theater	February 5–21	
2001	(2001) SPAF Seoul Performing Arts Festival: Princess Bari	(2001) SPAF 서울공연예술제: 바리공주	Giri	Sejong Center for the Performing Arts	October 12–15	
2002	(2002) SPAF Seoul Performing Arts Festival: Happy House	(2002) SPAF 서울공연예술제: 행복한 집	Wife	Hakjeon Blue Small Theater	May 9–19	
2002	Specialised in Raw Meat	생고기전문	—N/a	Daehak-ro Small Theater rhythm space	October 3–27	Producer
2005	Hyun Bin's Goodnori play 'Choice'	극단 현빈의 굿놀이 연극 '선택'	Manshin, a female shaman	Inaso Theater	Nov 5–11	
2005	Hyun Bin's Goodnori play 'Choice'	극단 현빈의 굿놀이 연극 '선택'	Manshin, a female shaman	Jeongmiso, Daehangno Installation Theater	Nov 25 – Dec 4	
2006	The Richness	부유도	—N/a	National Theater Sky Theater	October 25–29	Artistic Director
2008	Dangun Bonpuri	단군본풀이	Dangun	Korean Music Hall	January 29 – February 3	
2010	There is Nothing Wrong with the Chair	의자는 잘못 없다	—N/a	Daehangno Theater	August 24–26	producer

==== Musical ====
List of musical play(s)
Year	Title		Role	Theater	Date	Ref.
Year	English	Korean	Role	Theater	Date	Ref.
1999	Beautiful autographs - delightful chatter of women who committed suicide!	아름다운 사인(死因) - 자살한 여인들의 유쾌한 수다!	Kim Gwi-in	Seoul Arts Center CJ Towol Theater	November 4–24	

==== Theater ====
List of stage play(s) with other Theater Troupe
Year	Title		Role	Theater	Date	Ref.
Year	English	Korean	Role	Theater	Date	Ref.
1986	Oh Dad, Poor Dad, Mamma's Hung You in the Closet and I'm Feelin' So Sad	엄마가 아빠를 옷장속에 매달아 놓았어요 그래서 나는 너무나 슬퍼요!!	mother	Arts and Culture Center Grand Theater	6.24—6.30	
1997	Taxi Driver - Where are you going?	택시 드리벌 - 당신은 어디까지 가십니까?	passenger	Arts and Culture Center Small Theater	February 27 – March 18	
1997	(21st) Seoul Theater Festival: Taxi Driver - Where are you going?	(제21회) 서울연극제: 택시 드리벌 - 당신은 어디까지 가십니까?	passenger		October 10–15	
1999	Three Tall Women	키 큰 세여자	C	Yonkang Hall	6.8 – 6.20	
2000	Lady in the Pine House 101st Theater Company Constellation Performance	소나무집 여인아	Jin Woo-hee	Dongsung Art Center Dongsung Hall	6.29 – 7.9	
2000	(12th) Geochang International Theater Festival; Lady in the Pine House	(제12회) 거창국제연극제; 소나무집 여인아	Jin Woo-hee	Wicheon Theater	8.1 – 8.2	
2002	Welcome to Dongmakgol	웰컴 투 동막골	Nomu			
2009	3 Days 2 Nights with My Mother's	친정엄마와 2박3일	Mrs. Choi	Lee Hae-Rang Arts Theater	01.17 – 03.08	
2009	3 Days 2 Nights with My Mother's	친정엄마와 2박3일	Mrs. Choi	Changwon Seongsan Art Hall Grand	05.02 – 05.03	
2009	Unhyeongung Brother (2009) (10th) Okrang Drama Award Winner	운현궁 오라버니	Han Sang-gung	Namsan Arts Center	12.4 – 12.13	
2010	Theater Heated Battle 3 - The Most Beautiful Goodbye in the World	연극열전3 - 세상에서 가장 아름다운 이별	Sangju-daek	Daehak-ro T.O.M. Hall 1	04.23 – 07.18	
2011	The Most Beautiful Goodbye in the World	세상에서 가장 아름다운 이별	Sangju-daek	Taebaek Culture and Arts Center Grand Performance Hall	02.19 – 02.19	
2014	The Sea of Eomong	어멍의 바다	Superwoman	Uniplex Hall 1 (Grand Theater)	12.17 – 12.18	
2016	Smile Deokgu	웃어요 덕구씨	wife	Masterpiece Theater 2 (Former Fox Star Theater)	09.03 – 10.02	

=== National Theater ===
List of stage play(s) with National Theater
Year	Title		Role	Theater	Date	Ref.
Year	English	Korean	Role	Theater	Date	Ref.
1995	Bull	불	Bun-yi-eo-meom	National Theater Small Theater	Mar 29 – Apr 4	
1995	Bull	불	Bun-yi-eo-meom	Myeongdong Theater	Sep 1–7	
2012	It's a Flower	꽃이다	geomne	National Theater Company; Baek Baek Hee Jang Minho Theater	Sep 22 – Oct 7	

=== Theater Company Michu and Minye ===
==== Theater ====
List of stage play(s) with Minye Trope
Year	Title		Role	Theater	Date	Ref.
Year	English	Korean	Role	Theater	Date	Ref.
1981	Baenggi Good The 60th Minye Theater Troupe Theater Performance	배뱅이 굿	Samwol-i	National Theater Small Theater	10.23 – 10.28	
1983	Puppet Nooreum - Park Cheomji Nori		a great man	Minye Theater	3.1 – 3.15	
1983	Hannah's Ascension	한네의 승천	sadang-pae	Arts and Culture Center Grand Theater	6.25 – 6.30	
1985	Rice — The 87th performance	쌀	Woman	Arts and Culture Center Small Theater	8.29 – 9.3	
1986	Muldori-dong	물도리동	Shaman	Arts and Culture Center Grand Theater	September 1–5	
1993	The 111th Regular Performance Disengagement - Portrait of a seeker	脫俗 - 어느 구도자의 초상	Gwibunne	Arts and Culture Center Small Theater	3.18 – 3.31	
1993	20th anniversary commemorative performance Disengagement - Portrait of a seeker	脫俗 - 어느 구도자의 초상	Gwibunne	Hakjeon Small Theater	6.4 – 6.30	
1993	Disengagement - Portrait of a seeker	脫俗 - 어느 구도자의 초상	Gwibunne	Hakjeon Small Theater	8.31 – 9.19	
1995	That Woman's Novel (Original Title: Little Grandmother) the 22nd anniversary of the founding of the theater company Minye Theater	(제19회) 서울연극제: 그 여자의 소설	Jag Eun-Daegu	Arts and Culture Center Small Theater	June 3–15	
1995	That Woman's Novel (Original Title: Little Grandmother) the 19th Seoul Theater Festival in 1995	(제19회) 서울연극제: 그 여자의 소설	Jag Eun-Daegu	Arts and Culture Center Small Theater	September 19 to October 1	
1995	That Woman's Novel (Original Title: Little Grandmother)	(제19회) 서울연극제: 그 여자의 소설	Jag Eun-Daegu	Arts and Culture Center Small Theater	Nov 1 – Dec 31	
1996	Arirang Jeongseon - The sound of life, the sound of love	아리랑 정선 - 삶의 소리, 사랑의 소리	mother	Arts and Culture Center Small Theater	April 26 – May 8	

List of stage play(s) with Michu Trope
Year	Title		Role	Theater	Date	Ref.
Year	English	Korea	Role	Theater	Date	Ref.
1986	Muldori-dong	물도리동	Shaman	Arts and Culture Center Grand Theater	9.1 – 9.5	
1991	Shadow of Time - Trilogy	시간의 그림자 - 3부작	mother	Arts and Culture Center Grand Theater	June 25–30	
1989	Shin Yi Gukgi	신이국기	Seoul	Arts and Culture Center Grand Theater	May 9–15	
1996	Dung Dung Nakrang Dung	둥둥 낙랑 둥	King Bang Sook	Seoul Art Center CJ Towol Theater	July 12–24	

==== Musical ====
List of musical play(s) with Michu Troupe
Year	Title		Role	Theater	Date	Ref.
Year	English	Korean	Role	Theater	Date	Ref.
1990	Make a Hero	영웅만들기	executive	Arts and Culture Center Grand Theater	Mar 27 – Apr 2	

== Awards ==
List of award(s)
Award	Year	Category	Works	Result	Ref.
19th Seoul Theater Festival Acting Award	1995	Best Actress	That Woman's Novel (Original Title: Little Grandmother)	Won	
4th Hiseo Theater Award	1999	Best Actress	Lee Yong-yi	Won	
