= Lee Han-wi =

South Korean actor

- Born: June 17, 1961 (age 65); Gwangju, South Jeolla Province, South Korea
- Education: Chosun University – Precision Mechanical Engineering; Chung-Ang University Graduate School of Business – MBA
- Occupation: Actor
- Years active: 1983–present
- Spouse: Choi Hye-kyung (m. 2008)
- Children: 2

Korean name
- Hangul: 이한위
- Hanja: 李漢偉
- RR: I Hanwi
- MR: I Hanwi

Lee Han-wi (born June 17, 1961) is a South Korean actor. Since his acting debut in 1983, Lee has become a prolific supporting actor on Korean film and television. He is particularly known for his mastery of ad-libbing.

== Personal life ==
Lee married professional makeup artist Choi Hye-kyung in 2008, whom he met on the set of Immortal Admiral Yi Sun-sin. Choi is 19 years younger than Lee. The couple has two children.

== Filmography ==
=== Film ===
Year	Title	Role
1996	Henequen	
1998	Christmas in August	Chul-goo
2000	Joint Security Area	Major Kang
2001	A Story of My Fiancée	Jung-ho's friend
2001	Sorum	Drunk in taxi
2002	Bad Guy	Dal-soo
2003	Show Show Show	Factory foreman
2003	Reversal of Fortune	Dong-choon
2004	Mokpo, Gangster's Paradise	Supervisor Hwang (cameo)
2004	My Mother, the Mermaid	Jo Young-ho
2005	Murder, Take One	Manager
2005	Duelist	Husband of moaning lady (cameo)
2005	April Snow	In-soo's senior colleague
2005	Bravo, My Life	PE teacher
2006	Running Wild	Section chief Bang
2006	Hanbando	Excavation team leader
2006	Holy Daddy	Kal-nal
2006	No Mercy for the Rude	Killa's chief
2006	Solace	In-seob
2006	Righteous Ties	Sung Bong-sik
2006	200 Pounds Beauty	Lee Kong-hak
2007	Master Kims	Eldest
2007	My Son	Priest
2007	Underground Rendezvous	Jong-seok
2007	Swindler in My Mom's House	Loan shark (cameo)
2007	Going by the Book	Police force team leader
2007	My Love	(cameo)
2008	Life Is Beautiful	Company president Jung (cameo)
2008	Our School's E.T.	Principal Joo Ho-shik
2009	Oh! My God 2	Founder of five-star Han-wi Land (cameo)
2009	More than Blue	Company president Kim
2009	Take Off	Company president Ma
2009	Where is Jung Seung-pil?	Drunken man
2009	Good Morning President	Congressman 2 (cameo)
2010	The Quiz Show Scandal	Company president Kim
2010	Hello Ghost	Male shaman (cameo)
2011	Heartbeat	Tuning shop owner (cameo)
2011	Romantic Heaven	Peter, the secretary
2011	Meet the In-Laws	Coffee shop DJ (cameo)
2011	The Apprehenders	Lee Yong-gap (cameo)
2011	The Cat	Pet shop owner (cameo)
2011	Athena: The Movie	Park Sung Cheol (cameo)
2011	Sector 7	Jang Moon-hyeong
2011	War of the Arrows	Gab-yong
2011	Mr. Idol	Hong Gil-dong (cameo)
2012	Dancing Queen	Han-wi
2012	The Scent	Chief detective Sa
2012	As One	Sports commentator
2012	Paradox Circle	Kyung-soo
2012	Marrying the Mafia 5: Return of the Family	Plastic surgeon (cameo)
2012	The Tower	Church elder Kim
2014	We Are Brothers	Security guard (cameo)
2015	Polaroid	(cameo)
2016	Love, Lies	Purser
2016	Chasing	Detachment commander of police (cameo)
2016	The Last Ride	Gap-deok's father
2016	Proof of Innocence	Dr. Park (cameo)
2016	A Break Alone	Assistant manager (cameo)
2016	Female War: Bloody War in Bongcheon-dong	Doo-cheol (cameo)
2017	House of the Disappeared	Geomancer Jang (cameo)
2017	My Little Baby, Jaya	(cameo)
2018	The March for the Lost	Agent Choi Yeong Chan (cameo)
2019	Race to Freedom: Um Bok Dong	Shoemaker (cameo)
2019	Let Us Meet Now	Section Chief
2019	Dead Again	Devil worshipper
2019	My Bossy Girl	Hye-Jin's father
2020	Somewhere in Between	Mr. Oh
2020	Wolves	

=== Television series ===
Year	Title	Role
1985	Wild Horse Chasing The Stars	
1986	Rich Artifacts	Troubleshooter
1986	Windfall	Jeong Han-Wi
1987	Land	
1988	The Region of Calm	Yoo Do-hwan
1990	Seoul Earthen Bowl	Seung-chul, an aspiring singer
1990	Winter Traveler	Gangster
1993	Wild Chrysanthemum	
1995	The Age of Uniqueness	
1996	Colors: The Temptation of Lemon Tea	
1996	Hometown of Legends – "Postmortem"	
1996	Hometown of Legends – "White Stone Rock"	
1996	Reporting for Duty	Hwang Joon-young
1996	Yes, Sir	Military Police Sgt. Hwang Joon Yeong
1996	A Faraway Country	Taek-woon
1996	Drama Game – "Solomon of Okgye Inn"	
1997	Drama Game – "Sound, Sound, Sound"	
1997	Drama Game – "A Society That Encourages New Drinks"	
1997	Drama Game – "Sweet Dad"	
1997	Drama Special – "Making a Child"	
1997	Drama Special – "Christmas in May"	
1997	Hometown of Legends – "Ssinaeri"	
1997	Hometown of Legends – "Filial Piety"	
1997	Hometown of Legends – "Wishes of the Deceased"	
1997	A Bluebird Has It	Bruce Lee, MC of part 1 Shangri-La
1997	Sunday Best – "Ondal's Dream"	
1997	Into the Storm	
1998	Legendary Ambition	Mang-chi
1998	Purity	Senior radio PD
1998	Hometown of Legends – "Bamboo Ghost"	
1998	Angel's Kiss	
1999	Sunday Best – "She Meets Him"	
1999	Sunday Best – "Enbireyong"	
1999	Sunday Best – "Kiss of a Thirty-one-year-old"	
1999	School 1	PE teacher Park Bok-man
1999	School 2	PE teacher Park Bok-man
1999	Sunday Best – "The Wind Blows in Yeouido"	
2000	School 3	PE teacher Park Bok-man
2000	Sunday Best – "He Got Off at the Station"	Bae Do-sik
2000	Emperor Wang Gun	Ji-seon/Wang Chung
2000	Autumn in My Heart	Yoon Ji-hwan
2001	School 4	PE teacher Park Bok-man
2001	Life Is Beautiful	
2001	MBC Best Theater – "The Story of My Fiancee"	
2001	Fox and Cotton Candy	Section chief Oh Sang-jin
2002	Sidestreet People	Sung Man-hee
2002	Sunshine Hunting	Mr. Sticky
2002	Moon on Cheomseongdae	
2002	Drama City – "Ajumma Band Formation Event"	Kyung Min's husband
2002	My Platoon Leader	Sergeant Lee Soon-ho
2002	Inspector Park Mun-su	Chil-bok
2003	The Bean Chaff of My Life	(cameo)
2003	Lovers	Yoo Byung-joon
2003	Drama City – "S University Law Department Failure Case"	
2003	Damo	Baek Joo-wan
2004	New Human Market	Oh Pil-geun
2004	There's Light at the Tip of My Fingernail	Teacher Choi
2004	Lotus Flower Fairy	Boo Yong-jin
2004	Immortal Admiral Yi Sun-sin	Chun Moo-jik
2005	Sassy Girl Chun-hyang	Chunhyang's high school teacher
2005	18 vs. 29	Director Bang
2005	5th Republic	Kim Yong-nam
2005	Drama City – "Camel's Whereabouts Unknown"	Coach
2005	Resurrection	Im Dae-shik
2005	Princess Lulu	Department head Jo
2005	MBC Best Theater – "Garibong Ocean's Eleven"	Jung Doo-ho
2006	Drama City – "Kim Dong-su and the Case of the Fake Spy"	Detective Kim
2006	Spring Waltz	Lee Jong-tae
2006	Hearts of Nineteen	Ko Dal-soo
2006	A Farewell to Arms	Man-seok supermarket creditor
2006	Freeze	Park Hyung-joon
2006	Love and Hate	Daniel Bae/Baek Dam-bong
2007	Flowers for My Life	Loan shark
2007	Coffee Prince	Mr. Ku, the butcher
2007	Kimchi Cheese Smile	
2007	Drama City – "I'm a Very Special Lover"	Lee Gi-dong
2007	The Innocent Woman	Attorney Min
2007	Drama City – "Ssamdalg Misugi"	
2007	Evasive Inquiry Agency	Jang Taek-soo
2008	Constable Oh	Hyeong-bang
2008	My Sweet Seoul	Director Ahn
2008	Hometown of Legends – "Ghost Letter"	Deok-bae
2008	Glass Castle	Son Dong-sik
2008	Beethoven Virus	Kang Chun-bae
2009	Ja Myung Go	Woo Na-ru
2009	Good Job, Good Job	Mr. Min, the chef
2009	Tamra, the Island	Lee Sa-pyeong, the potter
2009	Hero	Na Kyung-man
2010	The Slave Hunters	Pogyo Oh
2010	Becoming a Billionaire	Teriah Park
2010	Oh! My Lady	Drama director (cameo, episode 1)
2010	Bread, Love and Dreams	Heo Gap-soo
2010	Eagle Eagle	
2010	Athena: Goddess of War	Park Sung-chul
2011	I Believe in Love	Kim Eui-joong
2011	Quiz of God 2	Chief of police (guest)
2011	Gyebaek	Imja
2011	Just Like Today	Kim Joon-tae
2012	Wild Romance	Kevin Jang
2012	Fashion King	Hwang Tae-san
2012	To the Beautiful You	Hwang Gye-bong
2012	School 2013	Woo Soo-chul
2013	7th Grade Civil Servant	Kim Pan-seok
2013	Incarnation of Money	Plastic surgeon (cameo, episode 5)
2013	Nine	Joo Sung-hoon
2013	Hur Jun, The Original Story	Kim Man-kyung
2013	Passionate Love	Ban Soo-bong
2013	Basketball	Yoon Deok-myung
2013	Stranger	Ryu In-ho
2013	Prime Minister & I	Nam Yoo-sik
2014	Emergency Couple	Dr. Jeon Hyung-seok (cameo, episode 1)
2014	12 Years Promise	Joo Chul-soo
2014	Cunning Single Lady	Doctor (cameo, episode 12)
2014	A New Leaf	Team leader Kang
2014	You're All Surrounded	Plastic surgery director Byung (cameo, episode 3)
2014	Marriage, Not Dating	(cameo)
2014	KBS Drama Special – "The Three Female Runaways"	Room salon owner
2014	Tears of Heaven	Orphanage director (cameo)
2014	Modern Farmer	Kang Young-sik
2014	Punch	Oh Dong-choon
2015	Super Daddy Yeol	Choi Nak-kwon
2015	KBS Drama Special – "Hair Transplant Day"	Bong Chang-hoon
2015	Warm and Cozy	Gong Jong-bae
2015	My Mother Is a Daughter-in-law	Park Bong-joo
2016	Local Hero	Team Leader Song
2016	Another Miss Oh	Oh Kyung-soo
2016	The K2	The President's Secretary (cameo, ep. 10)
2016	I'm Sorry, But I Love You	Park Dong-jin (cameo)
2017	Hospital Ship	Bang Sung-woo
2017	Introverted Boss	Chae Won-sang
2017	The Package	Yoon So-so's father
2017	Revolutionary Love	Kwon Choon-sub
2018	Bad Guys 2	Ryu Seok-ki (cameo)
2018	Cross	Neurologist (cameo)
2018	Mysterious Personal Shopper	Han Pil-mok
2018	Marry Me Now	Kim Young-sik (cameo)
2018	Lawless Lawyer	Ha Ki-ho
2018	The Beauty Inside	Ryu Eun-ho's father
2018	Top Star U-back	Choi Han-bong
2019	Different Dreams	Song Byung-soo (cameo)
2019	Her Private Life	Eom So-hye's husband (cameo, ep. 16)
2019	Perfume	Cho Chun-oh
2019	Chief of Staff	Chief Presidential Secretary (cameo)
2019	Home for Summer	Wang Jae-gook
2019	Psychopath Diary	Yook Jong-chul
2020	Live On	Headmaster (cameo)
2020–2021	True Beauty	Plastic Surgeon Doctor (cameo)
2021	Undercover	Bae Goo-taek
2022	Bravo, My Life	Kim Jeong-ho

=== Web series ===
Year	Title	Platform	Role	Ref.
2021	The Magic	KT Seezn		
2022	Kiss Sixth Sense	Disney+	Oh Kyung-soo	

=== Variety show ===
Year	Title	Network	Notes/Ref.
2011-2012	Saturday Night Live Korea	tvN	Cast member, seasons 1–2
2012	Reckless Family	MBC	Cast member
2013	The Wife Doesn't Know	TV Chosun	Host
2020	King of Mask Singer	MBC	Contestant as "Bread" (episode 251)

== Theater ==
Year	Title	Role	Reprised
2001	Knife Man		
	The Night of the Iguana		
	Death Song		
	혼자 뜨는 달		
	우덜은 하난기라		
	Six Minute Murder		
2007	Kyung-sook, Kyung-sook's Father	Cheong Yo-ri	
2008	Dandelions in the Wind	Elder	2011, 2014
2010	My Brother Has Returned	Lee Bong-jo/Dad	
2014	Wolnam Ski Unit	Elder Kim	

== Awards and nominations ==
Year	Award	Category	Nominated work	Result
2005	4th Sunkist Ladies Amateur Golf Tournament	단체상, Celebrity category	—N/a	Won
2006	KBS Drama Awards	Best Supporting Actor	Hearts of Nineteen, Spring Waltz	Won
2007	1st Korea Drama Awards	Most Popular Actor	The 1st Shop of Coffee Prince	Won
2007	6th Korean Film Awards	Best Supporting Actor	Solace	Nominated
2008	SBS Drama Awards	Best Supporting Actor in a Serial Drama	Glass Castle	Won
2021	8th Wildflower Film Awards	Best Supporting Actor/Actress	Kukdo Theatre	Won
