= My Dear Girl, Jin-young =

- Theatrical poster
- Hangul: 사랑해! 진영아
- RR: Saranghae! Jinyeonga
- MR: Saranghae! Chinyŏnga
- Directed by: Lee Sung-eun
- Written by: Lee Sung-eun
- Produced by: Hwang Dong-goong
- Starring: Kim Gyu-ri; Park Won-sang
- Cinematography: Park Ji-seon
- Edited by: Son Yeon-ji
- Music by: Jeong Yong-jin
- Release date: November 7, 2013
- Running time: 102 minutes
- Country: South Korea
- Language: Korean

My Dear Girl, Jin-young (Korean: 사랑해! 진영아; also known as I Love You, Jin-young!) is a 2013 South Korean drama film starring Kim Gyu-ri and Park Won-sang. Directed by Lee Sung-eun in his first feature film, it revolves around a failing screenwriter whose life is in a mess.

== Plot ==
Kim Jin-young (Kim Gyu-ri) is an aspiring screenwriter but is unable to sell her scripts as she is obsessed and writes only about zombies. Although in her thirties, she was never in a relationship.

One day, she meets her senior alumnus Hwang Tae-il (Park Won-sang) who finds her script interesting and decides to make it into a film. Since then, her life starts to change.

== Cast ==
- Kim Gyu-ri as Kim Jin-young
- Park Won-sang as Hwang Tae-il
- Yoon So-jeong as Park Chul-soon
- Choi Yu-hwa as Kim Ja-young
- Jung In-seo as In-seo
- Jeon Soo-jin as Jamie
- Im Won-hee as gynecologist (cameo)

== Reception ==
Korean Cinema Today: The film positively portrays the work and love of women and their thoughts on their families through their everyday lives.

Hancinema: Netizens claim it's a healing movie which connects with female viewers.
