= Jung Jae-young =

South Korean actor (born 1970)

Jeong Jae-yeong
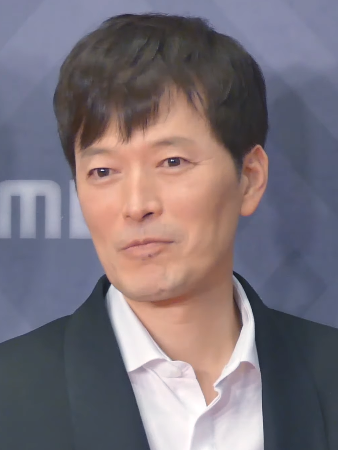
- Jung in December 2018
- Born: Jeong Ji-hyeon; November 21, 1970 (age 55); Seoul, South Korea
- Education: Seoul Institute of the Arts – Theater
- Occupation: Actor
- Years active: 1996–present
- Agent: Outer Korea

Korean name
- Hangul: 정재영
- Hanja: 鄭在詠
- RR: Jeong Jaeyeong
- MR: Chŏng Chaeyŏng

Former name
- Hangul: 정지현
- RR: Jeong Jihyeon
- MR: Chŏng Chihyŏn
- Website: outerkorea.com/jungjaeyoung

Jeong Jae-yeong (born Jeong Ji-hyeon; November 21, 1970) is a South Korean actor. He is known for starring in the films Guns & Talks (2001), Silmido (2003), Someone Special (2004), Welcome to Dongmakgol (2005), Public Enemy Returns (2008), Castaway on the Moon (2009), Moss (2010), and Confession of Murder (2012), as well as the television series Partners for Justice (2018–19).

== Early years and education ==
Jung completed his education at Seoul Hanyeong High School and then in 1990 enrolled to Department of Theater of Seoul Institute of the Arts. During his time in university he participated in a play and received recognition for his outstanding performance, which greatly influenced his career trajectory. From his early days as a theater actor, Jung Jae-young has collaborated with director Jang Jin, who was a year ahead of him in the Department of Theater at Seoul Institute of the Arts. He made his debut in the theater production "Heotang" and subsequently appeared in "Leave When I Clap," "Liar," and "Magic Time."

== Career ==
Jung Jae-young started his career taking minor roles in films ranging from his debut The Adventures of Mrs. Park to Green Fish (1997), The Quiet Family (1998), and Die Bad (2000). However throughout this period he was primarily occupied with works by director/playwright Jang Jin, both on the stage and in minor roles for the films The Happenings and The Spy.

Jung's first prominent film role came in Jang Jin's third film Guns & Talks in 2001, where he played one member of the film's central quartet of assassins. The following year, he played a ruthless, cruel-minded hustler in Ryoo Seung-wan's No Blood No Tears. In 2003, his role as a death row convict turned soldier in the record-breaking Silmido marked the height of this stage of his career.

In 2004, Jung reunited with Jang in a romantic comedy Someone Special which provided him with his first lead role. For his performance in the film, he won Best Actor award at Busan Film Critics Awards. He then starred in a commercially and critically successful film Welcome to Dongmakgol. The film was based on one of Jang Jin's plays which Jung had also performed in. For his performance as a war-weary North Korean officer who befriends his counterparts from the South, Jung won Best Actor at Director's Cut Awards.

From 2005 to 2009, Jung played a string of various roles; from a shy rural farmer who travels to Uzbekistan in the hopes of finding a wife in Wedding Campaign, a betrayed gangster in Righteous Ties, a cop during a bank robbery drill gone awry in Going by the Book, a CEO under investigation in Public Enemy Returns, to a Joseon merchant who gets drawn into plans for developing a rocket against the Ming Dynasty in The Divine Weapon, and a suicidal man who finds himself washed up and stranded on an uninhabited island in Castaway on the Moon.

In 2010, Jung starred as a sinister 70-year-old village elder in the film adaptation of the popular webcomic Moss. His performance in Moss won him Buil Film Awards and Blue Dragon Film Awards for Best Actor. The following year, Jung was cast as a fading baseball star who is forced to coach a team of hearing-impaired kids in GLove, and a cold-hearted debt collector who needs a transplant in Countdown.

Jung returned in 2014 as a detective facing off against a bestselling novelist who makes a Confession of Murder, an obsessive-compulsive who falls for a carefree musician in rom-com The Plan Man, a father tracking down his daughter's killers in Broken, and an undercover assassin who tries to protect King Jeongjo in a period drama The Fatal Encounter.

In 2015, Jung was cast in his first ever television series as a welder-turned-rookie lawmaker in political drama Assembly. He next starred as a detective in science fiction thriller Duel, followed by Hong Sang-soo's film Right Now, Wrong Then. The film won the Golden Leopard, the top prize at the 68th Locarno International Film Festival, as well as Best Actor for Jung. For his performance in Right Now, Wrong Then, Jung also won Best Actor at the 35th Korean Association of Film Critics Awards, 9th Asia Pacific Screen Awards, 53rd Gijón International Film Festival, and 3rd Wildflower Film Awards. In the same year, he starred in a comedy film You Call It Passion.

Jung reunited with Hong Sang-soo in a 2017 film On the Beach at Night Alone. The film was selected to compete for the Golden Bear in the main competition section of the 67th Berlin International Film Festival. The following year, Jung played in his second television series Partners for Justice. For his performance in the series, Jung won Top Excellence Award at the 2018 MBC Drama Awards.

In 2019, Jung played Joon-gul in a comedy film The Odd Family: Zombie On Sale.

In 2021, Jung appeared in the MBC drama On the Verge of Insanity aired on MBC, alongside Moon So-ri and Lee Sang-yeob.

== Filmography ==
Key
†	Denotes films that have not yet been released

=== Film ===
Year	Title	Role	Notes	Ref.
1996	The Adventures of Mrs. Park	불량배		
1997	Green Fish	cabaret guest		
1997	Push! Push!	Park Jang-geun		
1998	The Quiet Family	Hyun-suk, the gigolo		
1998	The Happenings	낯익은		
1999	The Spy	taxi robber #4		
2000	Taxi of Terror	Nonstop		
2000	Die Bad	Seong-bin's older brother	short film "Nightmare"	
2000	A Terrible Day		short film	
2001	Guns & Talks	Jae-young		
2002	No Blood No Tears	Dok-bul		
2002	Sympathy for Mr. Vengeance	husband of Dong-jin's ex-wife	cameo	
2002	No Comment	stalker/arsonist high school bully #1	short film "Enemies in Four Directions" short film "My Nike"	
2003	So Cute	뭐시기 ("So-and-So")		
2003	Silmido	Han Sang-pil		
2004	Someone Special	Dong Chi-sung		
2005	Welcome to Dongmakgol	Rhee Su-hwa		
2005	Murder, Take One	bully	cameo	
2005	Wedding Campaign	Hong Man-taek		
2006	My Captain, Mr. Underground	Kim Dae-chul		
2006	Righteous Ties	Dong Chi-sung		
2007	My Son	father goose	voice cameo	
2007	Going by the Book	Jung Do-man		
2008	Public Enemy Returns	Lee Won-sool		
2008	The Divine Weapon	Seol-joo		
2009	Castaway on the Moon	Kim Seung-geun		
2010	Moss	Cheon Yong-deok		
2010	The Quiz Show Scandal	judo man	cameo	
2011	GLove	Kim Sang-nam		
2011	Countdown	Tae Gun-ho		
2012	Confession of Murder	Detective Choi Hyung-gu		
2013	Our Sunhi	Jae-hak		
2013	11 A.M.	Woo-seok		
2014	The Plan Man	Han Jung-seok		
2014	Broken	Lee Sang-hyeon		
2014	The Fatal Encounter	Sang-chaek		
2015	Right Now, Wrong Then	Ham Chun-su		
2015	You Call It Passion	Ha Jae-kwan		
2017	On the Beach at Night Alone	Myung-soo		
2019	The Odd Family: Zombie On Sale	Joon-geol		
2022	Carter	Dr. Jung Byung-ho	Netflix film	
2023	Noryang: Deadly Sea	Chen Lin		
2024	Revolver	Min Ki-hyun	Special appearance	
2027	The Sword: Rebirth of the Red Wolf †	Heuk Su-gang		

=== Television series ===
Year	Title	Role	Network	Notes
2015	Assembly	Jin Sang-pil	KBS2	
2017	Duel	Jang Deuk-cheon	OCN	
2018–19	Partners for Justice	Baek Beom	MBC	Season 1 and 2
2021	On the Verge of Insanity	Choi Ban-seok	MBC	

=== Theater ===
List of Theater Play(s)
Year	Title		Role	Theater	Date	Ref.
Year	English	Korean	Role	Theater	Date	Ref.
1995	Heotang	허탕	Yoo Dal-soo	—N/a		
1997	Taxi Driver - Where are you going?	택시 드리벌 - 당신은 어디까지 가십니까?	Jang Deok-bae	Arts and Culture Center Small Theater	February 27–March 18	
1997	(21st) Seoul Theater Festival: Taxi Driver - Where are you going?	(제21회) 서울연극제: 택시 드리벌 - 당신은 어디까지 가십니까?	Jang Deok-bae	Arts and Culture Center Small Theater	October 10–15	
1998	Magic Time	매직타임	Jung Ji-hyun	—N/a		
1999	Heotang	허탕	Yoo Dal-soo	Academic Green Small Theater	August 7 to October 31	
1999	Liar	라이어	Detective Trotton	—N/a		
2000	Leave When They're Applauding	박수칠 때 떠나라	Jeong Ha-yeon	LG Arts Center	June 16–30	
2002	Welcome to Dongmakgol	웰컴 투 동막골	Novelist	LG Arts Center	December 14–29	
2004	Taxi Driver - Where are you going?	택시 드리벌 - 당신은 어디까지 가십니까?	Jang Deok-bae	Dongsoong Hall of the Dongsoong Art Center	July 16-August 29, 2004	

== Accolades ==
=== Awards and nominations ===
Year	Award	Category	Nominated work	Result
2004	25th Blue Dragon Film Awards	Best Supporting Actor	Silmido	Won
2004	3rd Korean Film Awards	Best Supporting Actor	Silmido	Nominated
2004	Asian Film Critics Association Awards	Best Supporting Actor	Silmido	Nominated
2004	5th Busan Film Critics Awards	Best Actor	Someone Special	Won
2005	4th Korean Film Awards	Best Actor	Welcome to Dongmakgol	Nominated
2005	13th Chunsa Film Awards	Best Actor	Welcome to Dongmakgol	Nominated
2005	8th Director's Cut Awards	Best Actor	Welcome to Dongmakgol	Won
2008	5th Max Movie Awards	Best Actor	Going by the Book	Won
2008	17th Buil Film Awards	Best Supporting Actor	Going by the Book	Nominated
2008	7th Korean Film Awards	Best Actor	The Divine Weapon	Nominated
2009	46th Grand Bell Awards	Best Actor	The Divine Weapon	Nominated
2009	32nd Golden Cinematography Awards	Best Actor	Castaway on the Moon	Won
2010	46th Baeksang Arts Awards	Best Actor – Film	Castaway on the Moon	Nominated
2010	11th Korea Visual Arts Festival	Photogenic Award (Movie Actor category)	Moss	Won
2010	18th Korean Culture and Entertainment Awards	Grand Prize (Daesang) for Film	Moss	Won
2010	11th Korean Entertainment Culture Awards	Grand Prize (Daesang) for Film	Moss	Won
2010	31st Blue Dragon Film Awards	Best Leading Actor	Moss	Won
2010	19th Buil Film Awards	Best Actor	Moss	Won
2010	47th Grand Bell Awards	Best Actor	Moss	Nominated
2010	8th Korean Film Awards	Best Actor	Moss	Nominated
2011	8th Max Movie Awards	Best Actor	Moss	Nominated
2015	KBS Drama Awards	Top Excellence Award, Actor	Assembly	Nominated
2015	KBS Drama Awards	Excellence Award, Actor in a Mid-length Drama	Assembly	Nominated
2015	68th Locarno International Film Festival	Best Actor	Right Now, Wrong Then	Won
2015	9th Asia Pacific Screen Awards	Best Actor	Right Now, Wrong Then	Won
2015	36th Blue Dragon Film Awards	Best Leading Actor	Right Now, Wrong Then	Nominated
2015	35th Korean Association of Film Critics Awards	Best Actor	Right Now, Wrong Then	Won
2015	53rd Gijón International Film Festival	Best Actor	Right Now, Wrong Then	Won
2016	21st Chunsa Film Art Awards	Best Actor	Right Now, Wrong Then	Nominated
2016	3rd Wildflower Film Awards	Best Actor	Right Now, Wrong Then	Won
2016	25th Buil Film Awards	Best Actor	Right Now, Wrong Then	Nominated
2017	14th International Cinephile Society Awards	Best Actor	Right Now, Wrong Then	Nominated
2018	38th MBC Drama Awards	Grand Prize (Daesang)	Partners for Justice	Nominated
2018	38th MBC Drama Awards	Top Excellence Award, Actor in a Monday-Tuesday Miniseries	Partners for Justice	Won
2019	39th MBC Drama Awards	Top Excellence Award, Actor in a Monday-Tuesday Miniseries	Partners for Justice 2	Nominated
2021	41st MBC Drama Awards	Top Excellence Award, Actor in a Miniseries	On the Verge of Insanity	Nominated
2021	41st MBC Drama Awards	Best Couple Award with Moon So-ri	On the Verge of Insanity	Nominated

=== Listicles ===
Name of publisher, year listed, name of listicle, and placement
Publisher	Year	Listicle	Rank	Ref.
Korean Film Council	2021	Korean Actors 200 (Note: Introduces 200 actors that best represent the present and future of Korean cinema to the people in the film industry all over the world.)	Included	
The Screen	2009	1984–2008 Top Box Office Powerhouse Actors in Korean Movies	17th	
The Screen	2019	2009–2019 Top Box Office Powerhouse Actors in Korean Movies	48th	
