= We Are Brothers =

- Theatrical release poster
- Directed by: Jang Jin
- Written by: Bae Se-young
- Produced by: Lee Eun-ha; Cho Hyeon-seok
- Starring: Cho Jin-woong; Kim Sung-kyun
- Cinematography: Kim Sung-an
- Edited by: Jang Jin; Lee Yeon-jung
- Music by: Kim Jung-woo
- Distributed by: Showbox/Mediaplex
- Release date: October 23, 2014
- Running time: 102 minutes
- Country: South Korea
- Language: Korean
- Box office: US$6.7 million

We Are Brothers (Korean: 우리는 형제입니다; RR: Urineun hyeongjeimnida) is a 2014 South Korean comedy-drama film directed by Jang Jin, starring Cho Jin-woong and Kim Sung-kyun.

== Plot ==
Two brothers were separated in childhood at an orphanage, only to find each other as adults 30 years later. But right after their reunion, their birth mother, who has Alzheimer's disease, suddenly disappears. So Sang-yeon (a pastor raised in America) and Ha-yeon (a shaman) team up together and go on a road trip to search for her.

== Cast ==
- Cho Jin-woong as Park Sang-yeon
- Kim Sung-kyun as Park Ha-yeon
- Kim Young-ae as Seung-ja
- Yoon Jin-yi as Yeo-il
- Lee Hae-yeong as Eldest son of Kim Man-jae
- Jung Min-jin as Second son of Kim Man-jae
- Jo Bok-rae as Pickpocker's older brother
- Choi Tae-won as Pickpocket's younger brother
- Im Gi-hong as MacArthur
- Kim Jin-kyu as Assistant director
- Lee Cheol-min as PD
- Jo Seon-mook as General manager
- Kwon Oh-soo as CP head of department
- Cha Eun-jae as Writer Kim
- Lee Han-wi as Security guard (cameo)
- Kim Byeong-ok as Homeless Mr. Kim (cameo)
- Go Eun-mi as young Seung-ja (cameo)
- Kim Min-kyo as Towing man (cameo)
- Kim Kyeong-ae as Jeong-rye (cameo)
- Miles Meili as adoptive father
- Wendy Taylor as adoptive mother
