= Kim Byeong-ok =

South Korean actor (born 1960)

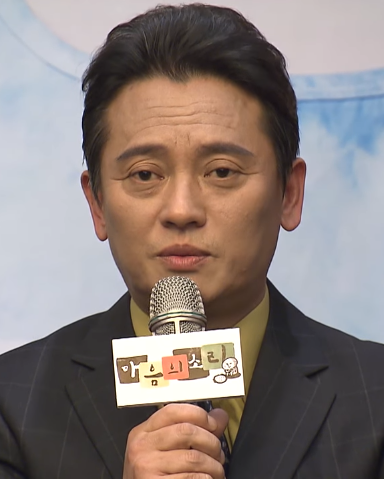
- Kim in 2016
- Born: October 11, 1960 (age 65); Bucheon, Gyeonggi-do, South Korea
- Occupation: Actor

Korean name
- Hangul: 김병옥
- RR: Gim Byeongok
- MR: Kim Pyŏngok

Kim Byeong-ok (born October 11, 1960) is a South Korean actor. A veteran supporting actor, he is best known for his role as Mr. Han in Oldboy.

== Career ==
In 2015, he was featured in a controversial Maxim Korea cover, standing next to a car smoking a cigarette with a woman's legs bound in duct tape protruding from the car's trunk.

== Filmography ==
=== Film ===
Year	Title	Role	Notes/Ref.
2003	The Classic	senior	
2003	Oldboy	Mr. Han	
2005	The Beast and the Beauty	Hae-joo's father	
2005	Crying Fist	Detective Oh	
2005	The President's Last Bang	Colonel Kim	
2005	Lady Vengeance	The Preacher	
2006	Forbidden Quest	deputy prime minister	
2006	The City of Violence	Youth president	
2006	No Mercy for the Rude	"Ponytail"	
2006	A Cruel Attendance	Joo Baek-dong	
2006	Sunflower	Jo Pan-soo	
2006	I'm a Cyborg, But That's OK	Judge	
2007	The Old Garden	Byeong-ok	
2007	Beautiful Sunday	Suk-jae	
2008	Open City	Hong Ki-taek/Hong Yong-taek	
2008	Nowhere to Turn	Dean of university	
2008	Dachimawa Lee	King Seo-bang	
2008	Our School's E.T.	president of publishing company	
2008	Baby and I	Joon-soo's father	
2009	The Weird Missing Case of Mr. J	Branch Office Manager	(cameo)
2009	Insadong Scandal	Officer Kang	
2010	Death Bell 2: Bloody Camp	hardware store owner	
2010	The Quiz Show Scandal	Kim Jeong-sang	
2011	Romantic Heaven	manhole man	
2011	Perfect Game	chief secretary	(cameo)
2012	Wonderful Radio	Director Im	
2012	Love Clinique	animation director	
2013	New World	Yanbian hitman 1	
2013	Kong's Family	Jang Baek-ho	
2013	Cold Eyes	mysterious broker	
2013	Fasten Your Seatbelt	monk	
2013	Queen of the Night	drunk at police station	(cameo)
2013	Red Family	hardware store owner	(cameo)
2014	Man in Love	priest	
2014	Man on High Heels	Dr. Jin	
2014	Kundo: Age of the Rampant	Toposa	
2014	We Are Brothers	Homeless Mr. Kim	(cameo)
2015	Dog Eat Dog	Min Tae-sik (voice)	(cameo)
2015	The Priests	Professor Park	
2015	Inside Men	Oh Myung-hwan	
2016	A Violent Prosecutor	President Park	
2016	Operation Chromite	Choi Suk-joong	
2016	Master	voice	(cameo)
2017	The Sheriff in Town	Chief Kang	
2018	The Witch: Part 1. The Subversion	Police Officer Do	
2018	The Spy Gone North	Dr. Jang	(cameo)
2022	B Cut	Tae San	

=== Television series ===
Year	Title	Role	Notes/Ref.
2008	Night after Night	Kim Hyuk-joong	
2012	Fashion King	Director Kim	
2013	Incarnation of Money	nursing home director (ep. 11)	(cameo)
2013	Pots of Gold	Hwang Jong-pal	(cameo)
2013	Heartless City	Jeoul ("Scale")	
2013	I Can Hear Your Voice	Hwang Dal-joong	
2013–14	The King's Daughter, Soo Baek-hyang	Yeon Bool-tae	
2014	Triangle	Go Bok-tae	
2014	Modern Farmer	Han In-ki	
2014	Mr. Back	Go-bong's doctor	
2014–15	Birth of a Beauty	fortune-teller	(cameo)
2015	Shine or Go Crazy	Ji-mong	
2015	A Girl Who Sees Smells	chief of police investigation team	
2015	Mask	Shim Bong-seo	
2015	Mrs. Cop	hired killer	
2016	Beautiful Gong Shim	Yeom Tae-cheol	
2016	Wanted	Jung Jung-ki	
2016	Uncontrollably Fond	Hyeon-joon's older brother	
2016–17	Blow Breeze	plastic surgeon	(cameo)
2016–17	The Sound of Your Heart	Jo Chul-wang	
2017	The Rebel	Magistrate Uhm Ja-chi	
2017	My Sassy Girl	Park Sun-jae	
2017	Man Who Dies to Live	detective agency manager Han	
2017	Go Back	Choi Gi-il	
2017	Because This Is My First Life	Yoon Jong-soo	
2018	Secret Mother	Lee Byung-hak	
2018	What's Wrong with Secretary Kim	Chairman Lee	
2018	My Secret Terrius	Yoon Choon-sang	
2019	Legal High	Bang Dae-han	
2021–2022	Show Window: The Queen's House	Kang Dae-wook	

== Awards and nominations ==
Name of the award ceremony, year presented, category, nominee of the award, and the result of the nomination
Award ceremony	Year	Category	Nominee / Work	Result	Ref.
Scene Stealer Festival	2021	Bonsang "Main Prize"	Show Window: The Queen's House	Won	
