= Someone Special (United States Navy) =

Someone Special was the official U.S. Navy recruiting film for the U.S. Navy SEALs during the Vietnam War era. This film was shown to all U.S. Navy recruits during their recruit training, and it was designed to motivate young sailors to volunteer for SEAL training.

== Details ==
The film was 26 minutes long.

The film covers the following topics:

- War games demonstration: what SEALs do and how they do it
- How to become a SEAL
- Overview of basic underwater demolition team/SEAL training (BUD/S)
  - BUD/S: first phase (physical training): PT exercises, beach running, obstacle course training, long-distance swimming, surf passage and rock portage, hydrographic reconnaissance, log PT
  - Hell week: bringing each man as close as possible to his physical and mental breaking point
  - BUD/S: second phase (land warfare): demolition techniques, rappelling, small unit tactics, live fire exercises at San Clemente Island, UDT cast and recovery training, beach clearing with live demolitions
  - BUD/S: third phase (diving phase): scuba training, ocean compass navigation, mock attacks on ships, submarine lock-in & lock-out training
  - BUD/S graduation
- Life in the teams: mark XV underwater breathing apparatus training, SEAL Delivery Vehicle (SDV) training, US Army Airborne training, high altitude low opening (HALO/HAHO]) training, rock climbing, arctic training, desert training, jungle training
