= CJ ENM Films & Television =

South Korean film company

- Type: Subsidiary
- Industry: Film
- Predecessor: Cinema Service
- Founded: 1995; 31 years ago
- Founder: CJ Group
- Number of locations: Seoul, South Korea
- Key people: Jinnie Choi (general manager/head of contents)
- Products: Motion pictures
- Services: Film distribution; Film production
- Revenue: ▲US$ 1.64 billion (2013)
- Operating income: ▲US$ 47 million (2013)
- Net income: ▲US$ 5 million (2013)
- Total assets: ▲US$ 2.12 billion (2013)
- Total equity: ▲US$ 1.22 billion (2013)
- Number of employees: 2,233
- Parent: CJ Group (1995–2011); CJ E&M (2011–2018); CJ ENM (2018–present)
- Subsidiaries: Filament Pictures
- Website: https://ocean.cjenm.com/en/

CJ ENM Films & Television, formerly CJ Entertainment, (Korean: CJ 엔터테인먼트) is a South Korean entertainment, film production and distribution company, founded in 1995 under the CJ ENM Entertainment Division. The company operates as a film production company, film publishing house, investment and exhibition.

== History ==
During early 1995, Cheil Jedang invested in the upstart film company DreamWorks SKG, and in June of the same year, Cheil Jedang established Multimedia Division. The division's later changed to CJ Entertainment in September, in time for their first film distribution deal with the movie Secrets and Lies. To aid their position in the film distribution industry CJ Entertainment built the first multiplexes of Korea with the first one, CGV Gangbyeon 11, opening in April 1998.

CJ Entertainment's importance in the Korean film industry grew in 1997–1998 when the nation was caught in the wave of the Asian financial crisis. Many smaller film companies had to close up, leaving the road open for CJ Entertainment to capitalize on the new-found popularity of Korean cinema brought on by the success of Shiri in 1999.

In January 2000, CJ Entertainment Inc was officially founded, and the first film Chunhyang to be distributed.

The success of their own films after the 2000 film Chunhyang, most notably Joint Security Area that broke the Korean box-office records previously set by Shiri, helped the company grow into one of the two largest film companies in the country along with Kang Woo-suk's Cinema Service. Lately CJ Entertainment has expanded into other fields of entertainment industry, including Internet and Cable TV businesses.

From 2007 to 2015, CJ Entertainment was the Korean distributor for films by Paramount Pictures, including films by DreamWorks which were bought by Paramount, as Universal Studios had taken over the Korean branch of its joint venture with Paramount, United International Pictures. CJ had already been distributing DreamWorks films for nearly a decade as a result of investing in the studio. It holds the highest market share among the distributors at 27.8 percent. CJ kept distributing Paramount's films in South Korea until 2015, when Lotte Entertainment took over distribution.

In 2010, CJ Entertainment was merged with CJ Media, M-net Media, On Media and CJ Internet to form the entertainment & media subsidiary CJ E&M. Since then, CJ Entertainment operates as a company under CJ E&M.

As of July 2018, CJ Entertainment's parent company CJ E&M merged into new company CJ ENM as a result CJ Entertainment operates under the new company since then.

== See also ==
- List of Korean-language films
- Cinema of Korea
- Contemporary culture of South Korea
