= Ha Ji-won filmography =

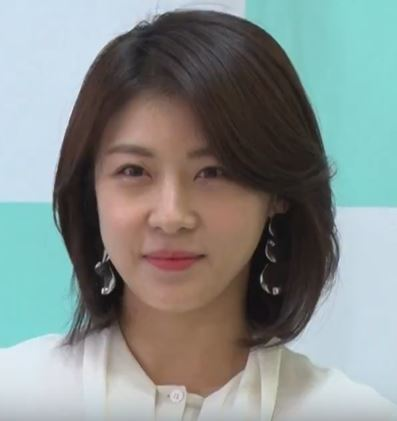
- Ha in 2016
- Film: 25
- Television series: 17
- Television show: 4
- Music videos: 6

Ha Ji-won (Korean: 하지원; born 28 June 1978) is a South Korean actress. She is best known for the historical dramas Damo (2003), Hwang Jini (2006), Empress Ki (2013), as well as the melodrama Something Happened in Bali (2004) and romantic comedy series Secret Garden (2010).

== Film ==
Year	Title	Role	Notes	Ref.
2000	Truth Game	Han Da-hye		
2000	Nightmare	Lee Eun-joo / Kyung-ah		
2000	Ditto	Seo Hyun-ji		
2002	Phone	Seo Ji-won		
2002	Sex Is Zero	Lee Eun-hyo		
2003	Reversal of Fortune	Han Ji-young		
2004	100 Days with Mr. Arrogant	Kang Ha-young		
2004	Love, So Divine	Yang Bong-hie		
2005	Daddy-Long-Legs	Cha Young-mi		
2005	Duelist	Detective Namsoon		
2005	All for Love	Yeon-ju	Cameo	
2007	Miracle on 1st Street	Myung-ran		
2007	Sex Is Zero 2	Lee Eun-hyo	Cameo	
2008	Miracle of a Giving Fool	Ji-ho		
2008	His Last Gift	Hye-young	Cameo	
2009	Tidal Wave	Kang Yeon-hee		
2009	Closer to Heaven	Lee Ji-soo		
2011	Sector 7	Cha Hae-joon		
2012	As One	Hyun Jung-hwa		
2014	The Huntresses	Jin-ok		
2015	Chronicle of a Blood Merchant	Heo Ok-ran		
2016	Life Risking Romance	Han Je-in	Korean-Chinese co-production	
2017	Manhunt	Rain	Chinese film	
2020	Pawn	Seung-yi		
2026	Portrait of a Family	Nam-mi		

== Television series ==
Year	Title	Role	Notes	Ref.
1997	New Generation Report: Adults Don't Understand Us	Student		
1998	Dragon's Tears	Na-in		
1999	Dangerous Lullaby	Young-eun		
1999	School 2	Jang Se-jin		
2000	Secret	Lee Ji-eun		
2001	Life is Beautiful	Yoo Hee-jung		
2002	Sunshine Hunting	Park Tae-kyong		
2003	Damo	Jang Jae-hui / Jang Chae-ok		
2004	Something Happened in Bali	Lee Soo-jung		
2005	Fashion 70s	University student	Cameo (Episode 3)	
2006	Hwang Jini	Hwang Jini		
2010–2011	Secret Garden	Gil Ra-im		
2012	The King 2 Hearts	Kim Hang-ah		
2013–2014	Empress Ki	Ki Seung-nyang / Ki Nyang		
2015	The Time We Were Not in Love	Oh Ha-na		
2017	Hospital Ship	Song Eun-jae		
2019–2020	Chocolate	Moon Cha-yeong		
2022	Curtain Call	Park Se-yeon / young Geum Soon		
2026	Climax	Chu Sang-ah		

== Web series ==
Year	Title	Role	Ref.
2021	Dramaworld 2	Ji-won	

== Hosting and variety show ==
Year	Title	Ref.
2002–2003	TV Entertainment Tonight	
2015	Go Go with Sister	
2018	Galileo: Awakened Universe	
2020	House on Wheels, Ep 11-12	
2021	Saturday Night Live Korea	

== Narrator ==
Year	Title	Notes	Ref.
2022	Kiss the Universe	Season 2	

== Music video appearances ==
Year	Song title	Artist	Ref.
2004	"Black and White Photo"	KCM	
2005	"Mother's Diary"	WAX	
2005	"Oppa"	WAX	
2005	"Flower"	Lee Soo-young	
2010	"Love Story"	Rain	
2015	"Daddy" - cameo	PSY	
2021	"Noting special with the day" (별거 없던 그 하루로)	Im Chang-jung	
