= Lee Si-yeon =

South Korean actress and model (born 1980)

- Born: 24 July 1980 (age 46); South Korea
- Occupations: Actress; model
- Years active: 1999–present
- Relatives: Seo Jae-hyuk (uncle)

Korean name
- Hangul: 이시연
- Hanja: 李詩姸
- RR: I Siyeon
- MR: I Siyŏn

Lee Si-yeon (Korean: 이시연; born July 24, 1980) is a South Korean actress and model. In 1999, Lee participated in the Anti-Miss Korea competition. In November 2007, Lee underwent sex reassignment surgery and changed her name to Si-yeon. Lee is the niece of Seo Jae-hyuk, a singer-songwriter and guitarist, member of Boohwal.

== Life ==
Lee debuted as a male model, becoming known for her feminine appearance and wearing women's clothing on the catwalk, but ultimately wished to pursue a career as an actor. She appeared in the films My Boss, My Hero (2001) and Sex Is Zero (2002), providing comic relief in effeminate male roles, but felt pressured into cutting her hair and building up muscle. Lee recalled that, "once I entered showbiz, I was forced to live a life I didn't like", and growing increasingly unhappy, made several attempts at suicide before deciding to transition.

Adopting the given name Si-yeon, Lee underwent sex reassignment surgery in 2007, and admitted to having doubts over her sexuality since being in secondary school. She returned to acting later that year in the sequel Sex Is Zero 2, with her character from the original film now also a transsexual. Lee publicly announced her sex reassignment prior to the release of the film, but was apprehensive about the reaction from audiences. Co-star Shin Yi observed that surgery had not changed her image much, and stated that she had always regarded Lee as a "kid sister".

== Filmography ==
=== Film ===
Year	Film	Role
2001	My Boss, My Hero	Shin Jin
2002	Sex Is Zero	Lee Dae-hak
2007	Sex Is Zero 2	Lee Dae-hak
2008	The Devil's Game	

== Discography ==
=== Studio albums ===
- I Became a Woman (2010)

== See also ==
- Harisu
- Hong Seok-cheon
- Jin Xing
