= Short time (disambiguation) =

Short time may refer to:

- Short-time working, in which employees agree to a reduction in working time and pay;
- Short Time, a 1990 comedy action crime film;
- Lee Dae-ro Can't Die, a 2005 South Korean action film also known as Short Time;
- The Short-Timers, a 1979 novel by U.S. Marine Corps veteran Gustav Hasford;
