= Yoo Chae-yeong =

South Korean actress and singer (1973–2014)

- Yoo in 2008

Background information
- Born: Kim Soo-jin; September 22, 1973; Anyang, South Korea
- Died: July 24, 2014 (aged 40) Seoul, South Korea
- Occupations: Singer-songwriter; actress
- Years active: 1989–2014
- Formerly of: Cool
- Spouse: Kim Joo-hwan (m. 2008–2014)

Korean name
- Hangul: 김수진
- RR: Gim Sujin
- MR: Kim Sujin

Stage name
- Hangul: 유채영
- RR: Yu Chaeyeong
- MR: Yu Ch'aeyŏng

Yoo Chae-yeong (Korean: 유채영; September 22, 1973 – July 24, 2014) was a South Korean singer, actress, and radio host.

== Early life and education ==
Born as Kim Soo-jin, she made her entertainment debut at 17 years old as part of the group Punsudeul ("Idiots") in 1989, when she was still in high school.

== Career ==
In 1994, using the stage name Yoo Chae-yeong, she became one of the original members of the popular K-pop group Cool. She initially attracted media attention for sporting a shaved head, which at the time was a bold hairstyle rarely seen on female South Korean celebrities. Yoo left Cool a year later, going on to make up one half of the duo US in 1995. She embarked on a solo singing career in 1996, and her hit song "Emotion" (released in 1999), contributed to the nationwide spread of techno music.

As an actress, Yoo appeared in supporting roles in movies and television dramas, notably in the comedy film Sex Is Zero (2002) and its sequel Sex Is Zero 2 (2007). She was also a popular radio host on the MBC program Good Weekend, It's Kim Kyung-sik and Yoo Chae-yeong, known for her quick wit and self-deprecating humor.

In 2009, after nearly a decade of absence from the music scene, she released a new single titled Another Decade.

== Death ==
Yoo was diagnosed with cancer in October 2013. She died on July 24, 2014, of gastric cancer at the age of 40.

== Filmography ==
=== Film ===
- Whistling Princess (2002)
- Sex Is Zero (2002)
- Who Slept with Her? (2006)
- Sex Is Zero 2 (2007)

=== Television drama ===
- First Love of a Royal Prince (MBC, 2004)
- Marrying a Millionaire (SBS, 2005–2006)
- My Cup (tvN, 2008)
- The Slave Hunters (KBS2, 2010) (cameo)
- Coffee House (SBS, 2010) (cameo)
- Twinkle Twinkle (MBC, 2011) (cameo)
- Brain (KBS2, 2011) (cameo)
- Fashion King (SBS, 2012)
- The Fugitive of Joseon (KBS2, 2013)
- Rollercoaster 3 (tvN, 2013)

== Discography ==
=== Albums ===
1. Poonsoo II (1990) – album with Punsudeul
2. The K;ul (1994) – album with Cool
3. The Us Rage To See The Day We Rule! (1995) – album with US
4. 쾌속(快速) (1996) – solo debut
5. Emotion (1999)
6. A Secret Diary (2001)
7. Another Decade (2009)
