= Untouchable Lawman =

- Film poster
- 치외법권
- Directed by: Shin Jai-ho
- Written by: Shin Jai-ho
- Starring: Im Chang-jung; Choi Daniel; Lim Eun-kyung
- Cinematography: Kim Hoon-kwang
- Edited by: Kyung Min-ho
- Production company: Storm Pictures Korea
- Release date: August 27, 2015
- Running time: 104 minutes
- Country: South Korea
- Language: Korean
- Box office: ₩1.98 billion

Untouchable Lawman (Korean: 치외법권) is a 2015 South Korean action comedy film directed by Shin Jai-ho. It was released on August 27, 2015.

== Cast ==
- Im Chang-jung
- Choi Daniel
- Lim Eun-kyung
- Kim Ji-eun as Eun-ju
- Lee Jin-kwon as Ma-neul's right-hand man

== Reception ==
The film has grossed ₩1.98 billion.
