= Ha Ji-won =

South Korean actress (born 1978)

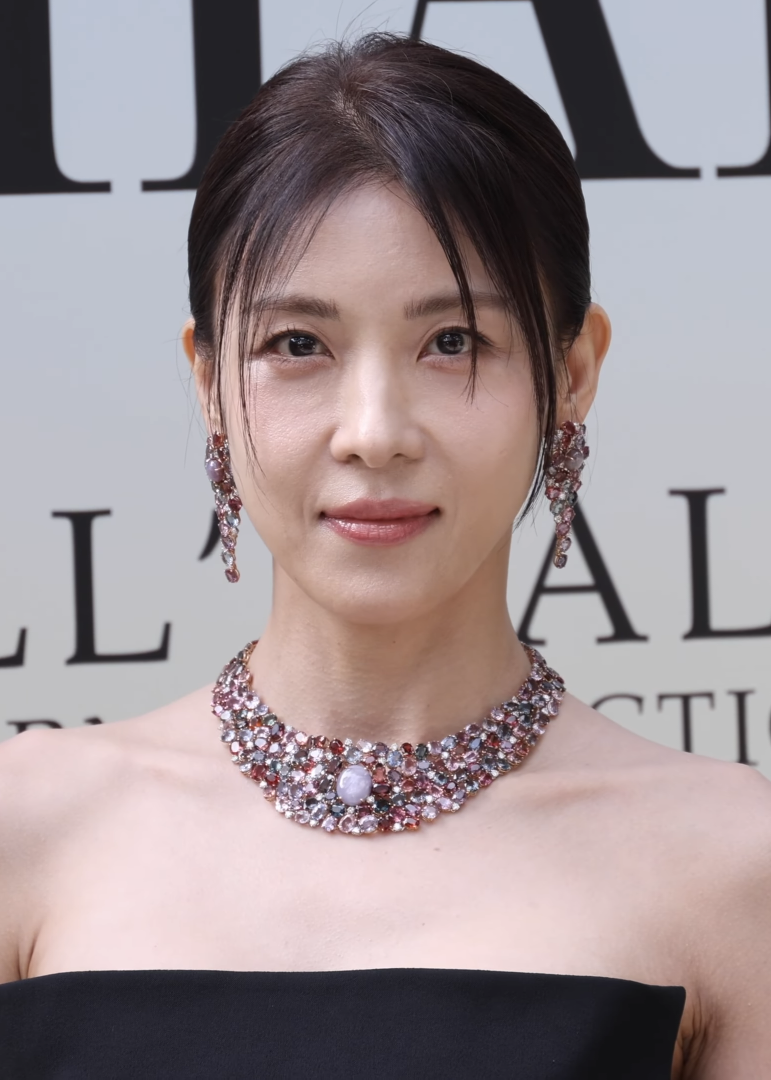
- Ha in September 2025
- Born: Jeon Hae-rim; 28 June 1978 (age 48); Boryeong, South Korea
- Education: Dankook University – Bachelor of Film and Television
- Occupation: Actress
- Years active: 1996–present
- Agent: Haewadal Entertainment
- Relatives: Jun Tae-soo (brother)

Korean name
- Hangul: 전해림
- RR: Jeon Haerim
- MR: Chŏn Haerim

Stage name
- Hangul: 하지원
- RR: Ha Jiwon
- MR: Ha Chiwŏn

Jeon Hae-rim (Korean: 전해림; born 28 June 1978), better known by her stage name Ha Ji-won (하지원) is a South Korean actress. She is best known for the films Phone (2002), Sex Is Zero (2002), Miracle on 1st Street (2007), Tidal Wave (2009), Closer to Heaven (2009), and Pawn (2020), as well as the television series Damo (2003), Something Happened in Bali (2004), Hwang Jini (2006), Secret Garden (2010–2011), The King 2 Hearts (2012), and Empress Ki (2013–2014).

She is one of South Korea's most critically acclaimed actresses, particularly known for acting in various genres such as action, comedy, horror, drama, sports and medical.

== Early life and education ==
Jeon Hae-rim was scouted by an agency when she was a senior high school student. The actress stated, "Ever since I was a little kid, I dreamed of becoming an actress. When I was a senior in high school, an agency contacted me after seeing my picture at a photography studio." She later graduated with a degree in Bachelor of Film and Television (BFTV) from Dankook University. In 2012, the actress revealed that she had failed over 100 auditions before her debut, "I passed my college entrance and written exams and was accepted to the department of theater and film. Before my debut, I auditioned for 100 or so projects but didn't get the roles."

Jeon candidly revealed that she adopted "Ha Ji-won" as her stage name as a favor for her previous manager as it was the name of his first love. "When I was about to debut, the first love of my manager's name was Ha Ji-won. I think he wanted to at least use the name of his love that was not fulfilled. The first time I heard the name Ha Ji-won, I thought it was pretty and also bold."

== Career ==
=== 1996–2001: Beginnings ===
Ha Ji-won made her TV debut in the 1996 teen drama, New Generation Report: Adults Don't Understand Us. She continued playing supporting roles in dramas, Dragon's Tears and Dangerous Lullaby in 1998 and 1999 respectively. But it was through the popular high school drama School 2, in which she played the role of a troubled teen, that she started to gain fame as an actress.

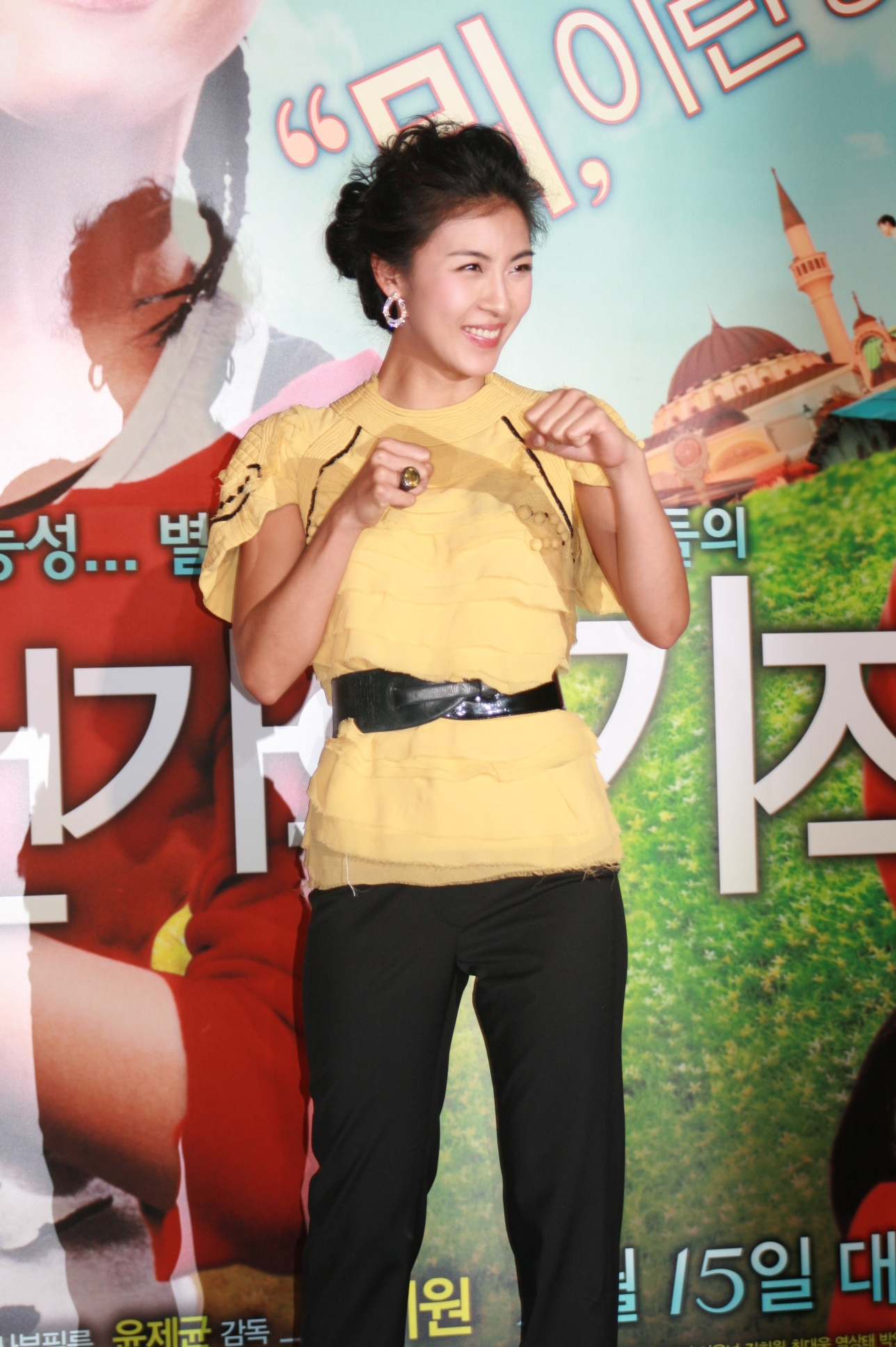
In January 2007

In 2000, Ha made her film debut in the thriller, Truth Game, alongside Ahn Sung-ki, where she was chosen for the role from a pool of 1,500 prospective candidates. For her portrayal of a bipolar character, Ha was awarded Best New Actress at the 37th Grand Bell Awards and 1st Busan Film Critics Awards. The same year, she starred in Ahn Byeong-ki's horror movie Nightmare, and sci-fi romance film Ditto, which won her the Best Supporting Actress award at the 21st Blue Dragon Film Awards. Later, Ha reunited with Ditto co-star Kim Ha-neul in the drama, Secret, playing an antagonist role. The drama earned her Best Rookie Actress recognition at the MBC Drama Awards and 37th Baeksang Arts Awards.

In 2001, Ha had her first leading role in Beautiful Life, where she played the role of a chaebol hotelier's daughter, opposite Kim Rae-won. This was followed by another starring role in Days in the Sun opposite Ji Sung.

In 2002, she appeared in Ahn Byeong-ki's in horror movie, Phone. The film was a huge success in South Korea and was also a hit in Italy, officially dubbing her as "Asia's Horror Princess". Following Phone in the same year was Yoon Je-kyoon's American Pie-inspired movie, Sex Is Zero, co-starring Im Chang-jung. The movie was the third most popular Korean movie in 2002 and ranked fifth among all films released in that year, winning Ha the Popularity Award at the 39th Baeksang Arts Awards.

In 2003, Ha starred in her first historical drama, Damo. Damo was highly popular among viewers in their 20s and 30s and turned into a cultural phenomenon. Ha's performance as a lowly police detective was highly praised and she was given the Top Excellence award at the MBC Drama Awards.

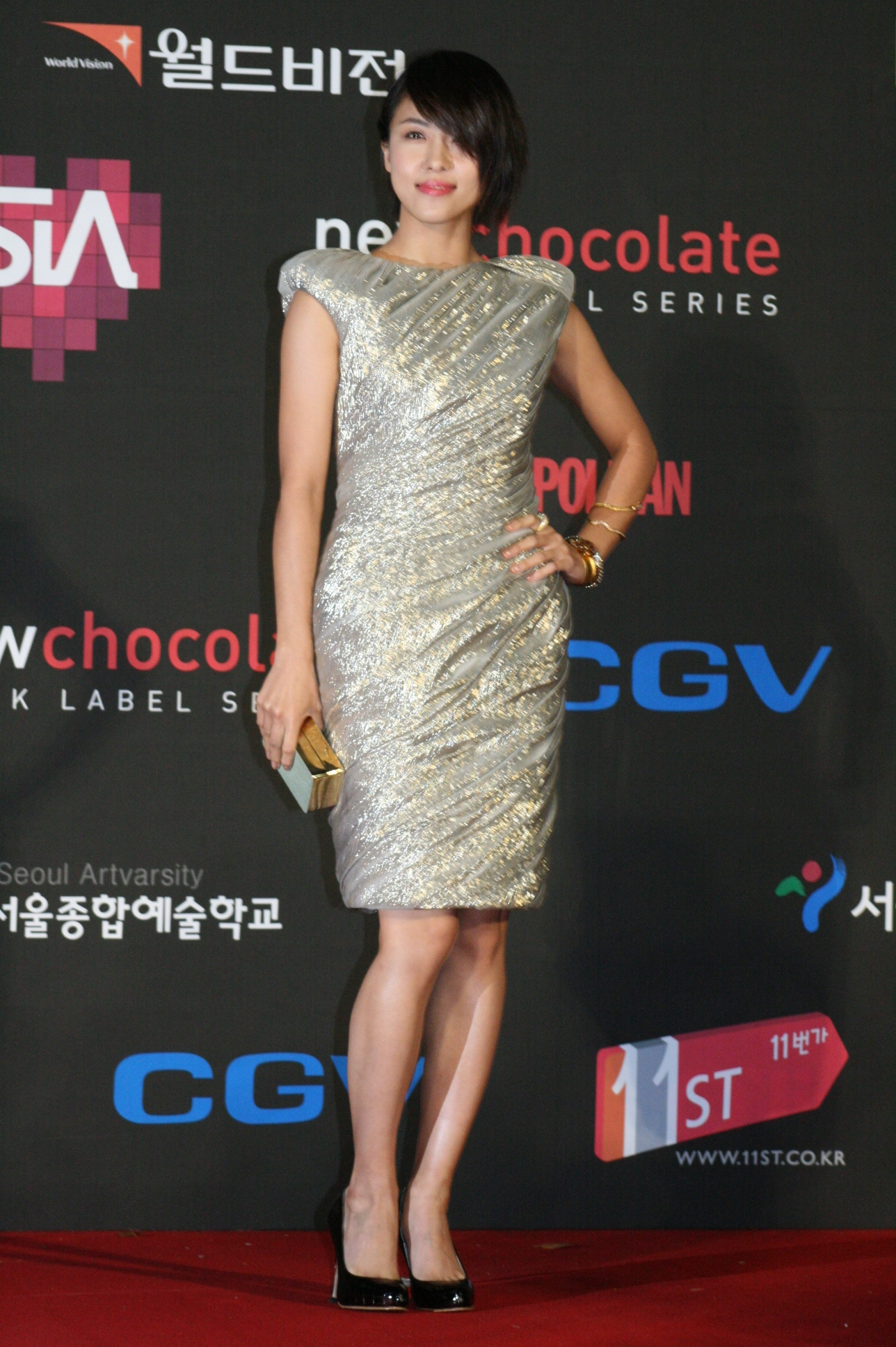
In November 2009

That year, she also she began dabbling into music and released her first album; Home Run, with the lead single being of the same name as the album & featuring Psy.

In 2004, she starred in the heavy melodrama, What Happened in Bali, alongside Zo In-sung and So Ji-sub. What Happened in Bali was a huge success, with its final episode reaching a peak rating of 39.7%, and won Ha the coveted Best Actress recognition at the 40th Baeksang Arts Awards. Ha also appeared in two films, internet fiction themed movie, 100 Days with Mr. Arrogant opposite Kim Jae-won and romantic comedy, Love, So Divine with Kwon Sang-woo. However, both films were not as successful with audiences.

Ha then played the role of the female protagonist in Daddy-Long-Legs, which was inspired by the novel of the same title written by Jean Webster. She also starred in Lee Myung-se's martial arts film, Duelist, opposite Kang Dong-won. At the 26th Blue Dragon Awards where Ha won the Popularity Award, she quoted Director Lee's line, "An actor never stops learning." which she said she had always been applying in her life as an actress.

In 2006, Ha starred in Hwang Jini, a period drama based on the real-life history of the character of Hwang Jini, who lived in 16th-century Joseon and is considered the most famous gisaeng in the Korean history. The series was a huge ratings success, giving rise to a boom in gisaeng-themed entertainment—musicals, TV dramas, films, even cartoons. Ha's performance won her the Grand Prize (Daesang) at the 2006 KBS Drama Awards.

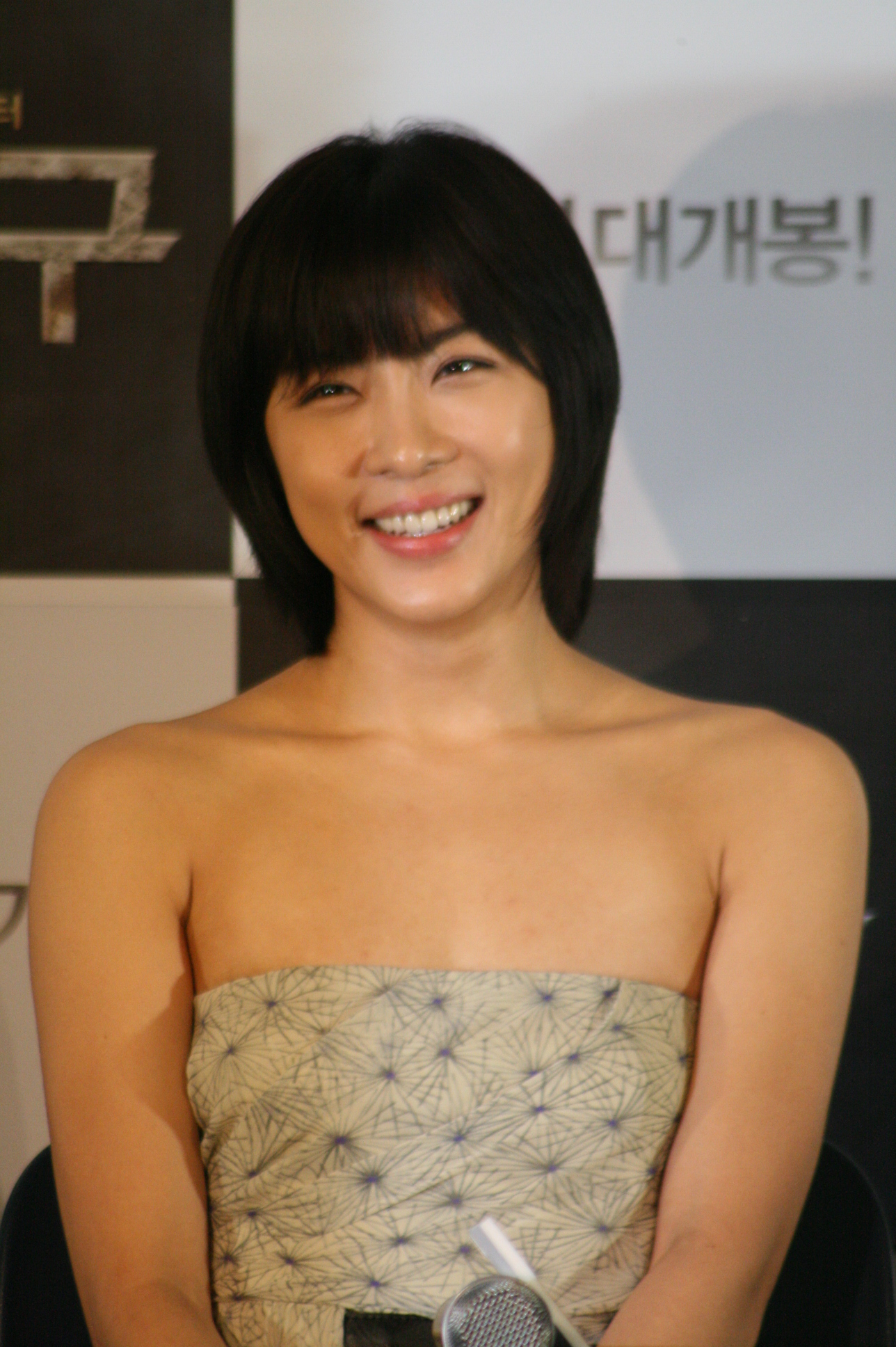
In July 2011

In 2007, Ha challenged herself in the role of a female boxer in the comedy film, Miracle on 1st Street. Coming from the team behind Sex Is Zero, the movie became the fifth most popular movie in that year. She then took on the role of a pianist in Miracle of a Giving Fool, which was based on a popular webcomic and won her the Popularity Award at the 44th Baeksang Arts Awards.

In 2009, Ha worked with Director Yoon Je-kyoon for the third time in the blockbuster disaster film Haeundae. The movie was funded by CJ Entertainment with a budget estimated at US$10–15 million, one of the largest for a Korean production. Haeundae was met with both critical and commercial success. It was the fourth highest-grossing film in South Korea then, giving Ha the honor of "The 10 Million Movie Actress" for bringing more than 10 million audiences. She then starred in Park Jin-pyo's melodrama Closer to Heaven. Ha's heartfelt performance in the film won her the Best Actress Award at the 30th Blue Dragon Film Awards and 46th Baeksang Arts Awards.

=== 2010–2013: International popularity ===
After taking a four-year break from dramas, Ha made a very successful comeback through the 2010 hit drama, Secret Garden, written by famous writer Kim Eun-sook. She played the role of a stunt woman, who magically switches bodies with a wealthy CEO character (played by Hyun Bin). Proven to be a commercial success, the drama series brought in high domestic ratings and garnered much interest regarding its fashion, catchphrases and music. Ha was awarded the prestige Best Actress at the Grimae Awards.

Ha then starred in science fiction 3D film, Sector 7. Although the film failed to do well in South Korea, it was a hit in China, garnering over 20 million yuan in China after just one week, beating previous records set by 200 Pounds Beauty at 16 million yuan. Ha had spent eight hours a day swimming and training with weights to get in shape for the role, obtained a scuba diving certificate and motor license in a week to "immerse" herself in character.

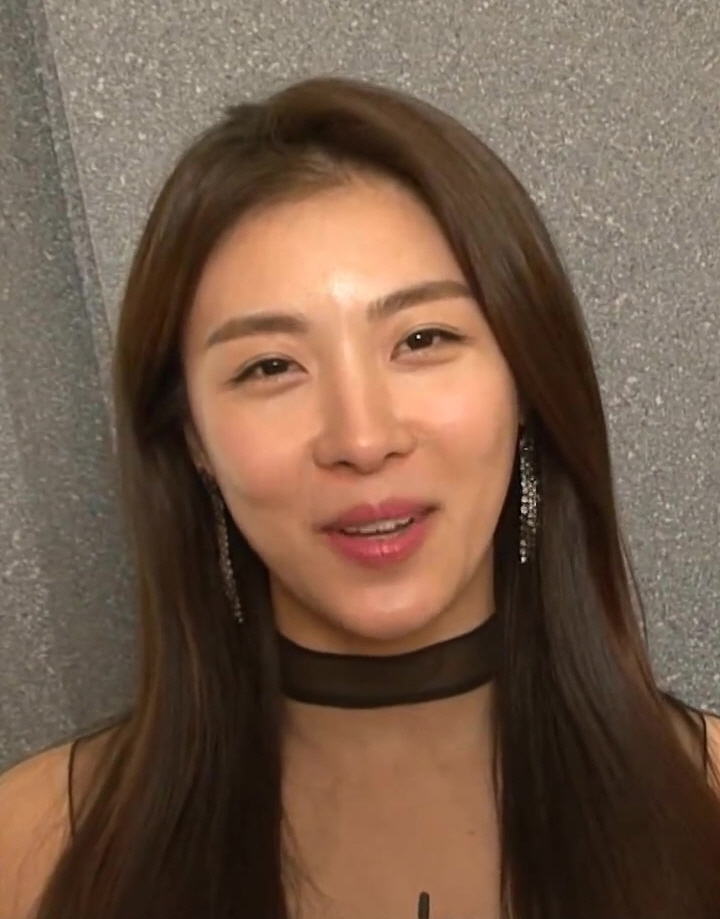
In January 2015

In 2012, Ha starred in alternate history drama The King 2 Hearts opposite Lee Seung-gi, playing the role of a Korean People's Army Special Operations Forces Officer who married a South Korean crown prince as a political strategy. It was also revealed that Ha had studied the North Korean dialect to make her portrayal of the character more realistic and genuine. Ha then acted in sports film As One, playing the role of a South Korean table tennis player. As Ha had simultaneously portrayed a North and South Korean character on the small and big screen, she was dubbed as "The Flower of Reunification" for crossing boundaries of the two nations.

In 2013, Ha was awarded her second Daesang award for her performance as the titular character in the hit historical drama Empress Ki. The drama achieved high viewership ratings throughout its run on MBC, and was also well-received overseas; particularly in Taiwan.

=== 2014–2024: Career fluctuations ===
In 2014, Ha, together with Kang Ye-won and Son Ga-in of Brown Eyed Girls, then starred in the Charlie's Angels-inspired action fusion sageuk, The Huntresses. In 2015, Ha was cast by Ha Jung-woo to play his character's wife in his self-directed movie, Chronicle of a Blood Merchant, a film adaption of the bestselling 1995 Chinese novel of the same title written by Yu Hua. Following that, Ha, alongside actor Lee Jin-wook starred in the Korean remake of the 2011 hit Taiwanese drama In Time with You, titled The Time We Were Not in Love. However, in contrast to her previous dramas, The Time We Were Not in Love received low ratings and Ha's performance was called into question. However, the show has received popular ratings among international post-broadcast audiences. In 2016, Ha starred in the South Korea-China co-production film, Life Risking Romance, alongside Taiwanese actor Chen Bolin.

In 2017, Ha starred in Manhunt, an international co-production by Hong Kong director John Woo. She played a female assassin in the film. Ha returned to the small screen with MBC's medical drama Hospital Ship, which started airing in August 2017. She plays an ambitious surgeon who finds herself on a hospital ship. She won the Top Excellence Award at the MBC Drama Awards for her role. In 2018, Ha joined tvN's space themed variety show, Galileo: Awakened Universe, her first variety show since debut. In 2019, Ha returned to the big screen with the romance melodrama Chocolate. In 2020, she starred in Pawn, a COVID-19 delayed, human drama film. In 2022, it was announced that Ha would hold fan meetings in Japan on 25 November in Tokyo and 27 November in Osaka. In October, Ha made her return to the small screen with Curtain Call (2022) after five years absence.

=== 2025–present ===
In 2026, Ha starred in ENA's political survival noir Climax as Chu Sang-ah, South Korea's top actress.

== Other activities ==
=== Music ===
Ha Ji-won made an appearance in the music video of Wax's debut song, "Mother's Diary" in 2000. Soon after, she performed Wax's song, "Oppa" on stage.

Ha released her debut album Home Run in 2003. The eponymous single from the album Home Run, featuring singer Psy, was later used as the OST for Reversal of Fortune.

After an eight-year hiatus on stage, Ha performed with her labelmates AA for their debut at the K-pop Super Concert in 2011.

On 13 June 2014, Ha released a digital single, "Now in This Place", for the fans who had been supportive of her drama Empress Ki. The lyrics of the song was written by the scriptwriter of Empress Ki, Jung Kyung Soon; and composed and produced by popular music producer Jae Chong (also known as Jung Jae-yoon).

In June 2015, Ha released a self-written song, "You Are Zoe", featuring ZE:A's Heechul. She personally wrote the song while working on OnStyle's Go Go with Sister in Grasse, France. The track was composed by singer The Film.

=== Fashion, books and film ===
In 2012, Ha gave a lecture on movie production in China as part of CJ CGV's cultural exchange program Toto's Workroom. As part of her contract with fashion label Crocodile Lady, Ha launched her own "Secret Jeans" line and designed a handbag for the brand which was sold for 179,200 won ($157). The same year, she published her first book This Moment.

=== Social activities ===
==== Ambassadorship ====
Year	Event	Title	Country	Ref.
2002	Puchon Film Festival	PiFan Lady	South Korea	
2008–present		New Zealand's Cultural Ambassador to Korea	New Zealand	
2012	2012 Summer Olympics	Honorary Coach	South Korea	
2014	National Tax Service	Promotional Ambassador (with Gong Yoo)	South Korea	
2014		Cartier Muse	South Korea, Taiwan	
2014–present	Operation Smile	Smile International Ambassador	Worldwide	
2015–present	Hanbok Day	Hanbok Ambassador	South Korea	
2015–present	Golden Horse Film Festival and Awards	Piaget Altiplano Ambassador	Taiwan	
2016–present	Korea Brand & Entertainment Expo 2016	Honorary Ambassador (with Winner)	China	

- Ha Ji-won is the first Asian woman and second Asian after Jackie Chan to be named promotional ambassador for Operation Smile.

==== Philanthropy ====
Although organ donation was not common in South Korea at that time in January 2005, Ha Ji-won made the pledge to donate her cornea through the Organ Donation Center of Love. The actress shared, "When I was in crisis of becoming blind in May of 2004 because of damaged cornea in my left eye while filming, but one prisoner sent me a letter expressing his willing to donate his own cornea to me, I was very thankful and greatly touched. I want to be of help to the visually impaired. It's shocking and pitiful that we import cornea from other countries."

Ha has also played an active role in helping underprivileged and disabled children, running a donation project named Smile Again Foundation with Gangnam-gu Family Welfare Center. The project was supplemented by Ha Ji-won's fan club members while she went the extra mile to ensure the sustainability of the project. Ha was conferred the Prime Minister's Award for the '2008 Family Month Event', in recognition of her consistent and active hard work in contributing to programs for poor and handicapped families.

In 2012, Ha donated the proceeds from her first book, At This Moment, to charity. The recipients of the book earnings, children's aid group Choi Kyung Joo Foundation and Yonsei University Hospital, announced their decision to set up a scholarship for prospective arts students and to subsidize treatment for deaf and blind children respectively. Sponsored by Ha, the organization has set up a "Hartist" (Ha + artist) scholarship to sponsor students who dream of careers in art.

Together with fellow actor Song Joong-ki, Ha attended Medical Korea 2013 Sharing Medical Treatment Commemorative Event, an event hosted by the Ministry of Health and Welfare, promoting greater international co-operation for medical technology and positive medical tourism. During the event, both actors spent time with recovering children and received an award for their previous efforts in promoting the sharing of medical services.

In 2015, Ha, fashion icon Ko So-young, and figure skater Yuna Kim designed bags in cooperation with the Italian luxury brand Fendi. The bags were offered via Seoul Peekaboo Project auction to raise funds for the charity. As Operation Smile's Ambassador, Ha decided to donate the proceeds from the bag she designed to Operation Smile, a NGO that performs cleft lip and cleft palate surgery and delivers postoperative and ongoing medical therapies to children in low and middle income countries.

In 2016, Ha donated 100 million won (US$83,604) to help victims of ferry disaster.

== Management ==
In 2013, Ha was reported to be leaving Wellmade STARM, her agency for ten years. She declined all the calls sent by other agencies with giant contracts and decided to establish her own one-person agency Haewadal Entertainment (lit. Sun and Moon Entertainment) instead. Also in the same year, Ha signed with United Talent Agency, one of the largest talent agencies in the world, for her Hollywood venture.

After establishing her own agency, Haewadal Entertainment, Ha simultaneously signed a contract with BM+ Entertainment to manage her activities abroad. In the same year, Ha signed with Invincible Plan to manage her Chinese ventures.

== Discography ==
=== Albums ===
Year	Title	Notes
2003	Home Run	

=== Digital singles ===
Year	Song title	Notes
2014	"Now in This Place"	
2015	"You Are Zoe"	feat. Heechul Of ZE:A

== Bibliography ==
Year	Title	Type	Ref.
2012	At This Moment	Memoir	
2015	Ha Ji-won's Secret	Photo Book	

== Accolades ==
=== Awards and nominations ===
Name of the award ceremony, year presented, category, nominee of the award, and the result of the nomination
Award ceremony	Year	Category	Nominee / Work	Result	Ref.
APAN Star Awards	2012	Top Excellence Award, actress	The King 2 Hearts	Nominated	
Asia Model Awards	2008	Popular Star Award	Ha Ji-won	Won	
Baeksang Arts Awards	2001	Best New Actress – Television	Secret	Won	
Baeksang Arts Awards	2003	Most Popular Actress – Film	Sex Is Zero	Won	
Baeksang Arts Awards	2004	Best Actress – Television	What Happened in Bali	Won	
Baeksang Arts Awards	2005	Best Actress – Television	Hwang Jini	Nominated	
Baeksang Arts Awards	2010	Best Actress – Film	Closer to Heaven	Won	
Baeksang Arts Awards	2011	Best Actress – Television	Secret Garden	Nominated	
Blue Dragon Film Awards	2000	Best Supporting Actress	Ditto	Won	
Blue Dragon Film Awards	2002	Best Leading Actress	Phone	Nominated	
Blue Dragon Film Awards	2005	Popularity Award	Duelist	Won	
Blue Dragon Film Awards	2009	Best Leading Actress	Closer to Heaven	Won	
Blue Dragon Film Awards	2009	Popularity Award	Closer to Heaven	Won	
Bucheon International Fantastic Film Festival	2012	Producer's Choice	Ha Ji-won	Won	
Busan Film Critics Awards	2000	Best New Actress	Ditto	Won	
Estée Lauder	2009	Star of the Year Award	Ha Ji-won	Won	
Golden Cinematography Awards	2001	Popularity Award	Truth Game	Won	
BNT Golden Chest International TV Festival	2007	Best Actress	Hwang Jini	Won	
Grand Bell Awards	2000	Best Actress	Truth Game	Nominated	
Grand Bell Awards	2000	Best New Actress	Truth Game	Won	
Grimae Awards	2011	Best Actress	Secret Garden	Won	
KBS Drama Awards	2006	Grand Prize (Daesang)	Hwang Jini	Won	
KBS Drama Awards	2006	Top Excellence Award, actress	Hwang Jini	Nominated	
KBS Drama Awards	2006	Netizen Popularity Award	Hwang Jini	Won	
KBS Drama Awards	2006	Best Couple Award	Ha Ji-won with Jang Keun-suk; Hwang Jini	Won	
KBS Drama Awards	2022	Top Excellence Award, Actress	Curtain Call	Won	
KBS Drama Awards	2022	Excellence Award, Actress in a Miniseries	Curtain Call	Nominated	
KBS Drama Awards	2022	Popularity Award, Actress	Curtain Call	Nominated	
KBS Drama Awards	2022	Best Couple	Ha Ji-won (with Kang Ha-neul); Curtain Call	Won	
Korean Broadcasting Awards	2007	Best Actress	Hwang Jini	Won	
Korea Dance Association Seoul Dance Festival	2007	Beautiful Mind Award	Hwang Jini	Won	
Korea Drama Awards	2011	Best Actress	Secret Garden	Nominated	
Korean University Films Festival	2009	Best Actress	Haeundae	Won	
Korea Visual Arts Festival	2002	Photogenic Award	Sex Is Zero	Won	
Korea Youth Film Festival	2009	Favorite Film Actress	Closer to Heaven	Won	
Korea Youth Film Festival	2012	Favorite Film Actress	As One	Won	
MBC Drama Awards	2000	Best New Actress	Secret	Won	
MBC Drama Awards	2003	Grand Prize (Daesang)	Damo	Nominated	
MBC Drama Awards	2003	Top Excellence Award, actress	Damo	Won	
MBC Drama Awards	2003	Popularity Award	Damo	Won	
MBC Drama Awards	2003	Best Couple Award	Ha Ji-won with Lee Seo-jin; Damo	Won	
MBC Drama Awards	2012	Top Excellence Award, Actress in a Miniseries	The King 2 Hearts	Nominated	
MBC Drama Awards	2013	Grand Prize (Daesang)	Empress Ki	Won	
MBC Drama Awards	2013	Top Excellence Award, Actress in a Special Project Drama	Empress Ki	Nominated	
MBC Drama Awards	2013	PD Award	Empress Ki	Won	
MBC Drama Awards	2013	Popularity Award, actress	Empress Ki	Won	
MBC Drama Awards	2017	Grand Prize (Daesang)	Hospital Ship	Nominated	
MBC Drama Awards	2017	Top Excellence Award, Actress in a Miniseries	Hospital Ship	Won	
Mnet 20's Choice Awards	2009	HOT Movie Star (Female)	Haeundae	Won	
SBS Drama Awards	2004	Top Excellence Award, actress	What Happened in Bali	Won	
SBS Drama Awards	2004	Top 10 Stars	What Happened in Bali	Won	
SBS Drama Awards	2010	Top Excellence Award, Actress in a Drama Special	Secret Garden	Won	
SBS Drama Awards	2010	Netizen Popularity Award	Secret Garden	Won	
SBS Drama Awards	2010	Top 10 Stars	Secret Garden	Won	
SBS Drama Awards	2010	Best Couple Award	Ha Ji-won with Hyun Bin; Secret Garden	Won	
SBS Drama Awards	2015	Top Excellence Award, Actress in a Miniseries	The Time We Were Not in Love	Nominated	
Seoul International Drama Awards	2012	Best Actress	The King 2 Hearts	Nominated	
Seoul International Drama Awards	2014	Best Actress	Empress Ki	Nominated	
Style Icon Asia	2009	Actress of the Year	Ha Ji-won	Won	
Style Icon Asia	2009	Fun Fearless Female	Ha Ji-won	Won	
Style Icon Asia	2016	Style Icon	Ha Ji-won	Won	

=== Other recognition ===
Award	Year	Category	Ref.
Dankook University	2007	Achievement Award	
Samsung Sparking Night	2012	Lady 9 Award (Shining Lady of 2012)	

=== State honors ===
Name of the organization, year presented, and the award given
Country	Organization	Year	Award	Ref.
South Korea	Ministry of Health, Welfare and Family Affairs – Family Month Event	2008	Prime Minister's Award	
South Korea	Minister of Health and Welfare	2013	Plaque of Appreciation	
South Korea	48th Korea Savings Day	2011	Prime Minister's Award for Savings	
South Korea	48th Taxpayer's Day	2014	Presidential Commendation	

=== Listicles ===
Name of publisher, year listed, name of listicle, and placement
Publisher	Year	Listicle	Placement	Ref.
Forbes	2010	Korea Power Celebrity 40	13th	
Forbes	2012	Korea Power Celebrity 40	34th	
Forbes	2013	Korea Power Celebrity 40	40th	
The Screen	2009	1984–2008 Top Box Office Powerhouse Actors in Korean Movies	39th	
The Screen	2019	2009–2019 Top Box Office Powerhouse Actors in Korean Movies	33rd	
