= Oh! My God (2006 film) =

South Korean film

- Theatrical release poster
- Hangul: 구세주
- Hanja: 救世主
- RR: Guseju
- MR: Kuseju
- Directed by: Kim Jeong-woo
- Written by: Kim Jeong-woo; Lee Hyeon-cheol; Kim Wook
- Produced by: Park Mun-sik
- Starring: Choi Sung-kook; Shin Yi
- Cinematography: Moon Yong-shik
- Edited by: Nam Na-yeong
- Music by: Lee Dong-joon
- Distributed by: ShowEast
- Release date: 16 February 2006
- Running time: 105 minutes
- Country: South Korea
- Language: Korean

Oh! My God (Korean: 구세주; RR: Guseju) is a 2006 South Korean film.

== Plot ==
Eun-joo develops a crush on playboy Jung-hwan after he rescues her from drowning, and vows to make him her man. One thing leads to another, and they end up having a one-night stand. Several years later, Jung-hwan is still living the high life while Eun-joo is working as a prosecutor. When they eventually cross paths, she reveals that he is the father of her twin children, and tries to make him grow up and take responsibility.

== Cast ==
- Choi Sung-kook as Jung-hwan
- Shin Yi as Eun-joo
- Park Won-sook as Jung-hwan's mother
- Kim Kwang-kyu as Secretary Shin
- Baek Il-seob
- Kim Do-yeon as Lady
- Park Jun-gyu
- Ha Ji-young as Supporting
- Kim Soo-mi as (cameo)
- Lee Won-jong as (cameo)
- Jo Sang-gi

== Release ==
Oh! My God was released in South Korea on 16 February 2006, and topped the box office on its opening weekend with 373,861 admissions. The film went on to receive a total of 1,858,668 admissions nationwide.

== See also ==
- List of South Korean films of 2006
