= Duel: Final Round =

- Film poster
- Directed by: Shin Jai-ho
- Screenplay by: Lee Hyun-chul; Min Kyung-geun
- Produced by: Oh Pil-jin
- Starring: Lee Joo-seung; Oh Ji-ho; Lee Jung-jin; Shin Jung-geun
- Cinematography: Kim Hong-gi
- Production companies: Humaniterra Pictures; The Contents On; Storm Pictures Korea
- Release date: September 22, 2016
- Running time: 97 minutes
- Country: South Korea
- Language: Korean

Duel: Final Round (Korean: 대결) is a 2016 South Korean action comedy film starring Lee Joo-seung, Oh Ji-ho, Lee Jung-jin and Shin Jung-geun, and directed by Shin Jai-ho.

== Plot ==
Choi Poong-ho (Lee Joo-seung) learns martial arts from Elder Hwang (Shin Jung-geun) to avenge his older brother Choi Kang-ho (Lee Jung-jin) who ends up in a coma after a duel with a wealthy businessman Han Jae-hee ( Oh Ji-ho).

== Cast ==
- Lee Joo-seung as Choi Poong-ho
- Oh Ji-ho as Han Jae-hee
- Lee Jung-jin as Choi Kang-ho
- Shin Jung-geun as Elder Hwang
- Son Eun-seo as So-eun
- Ahn Sol-bin as Jung-ran's colleague
- Kim Jin-yeop as Snatch-thief
