= Park Jun-gyu =

South Korean actor

- Born: June 27, 1964 (age 62); South Korea
- Education: El Camino College - Business Administration
- Occupation: Actor
- Years active: 1988–present
- Agent: Sedona Media
- Spouse: Jin Song-ah
- Children: Park Jong-chan; Park Jong-hyuk
- Parent: Park No-sik

Korean name
- Hangul: 박준규
- Hanja: 朴浚圭
- RR: Bak Jungyu
- MR: Pak Chun'gyu

Park Jun-gyu (born June 27, 1964) is a South Korean actor. The son of acclaimed veteran actor Park No-sik, Park is best known for playing the role of Ssangkal in Rustic Period.

== Filmography ==
=== Film ===
- Quit Your Life (1971)
- Zip Up (1972)
- The Chameleon's Poem (1988)
- Dangerous Passion (1989)
- Tainted Rose '90 (1990)
- Marijuana (1991)
- A Small Autocratic Republic (1991)
- The Teen Rebellion (1991)
- The New Eight Province Men (1991)
- Do As You Please (1992)
- The Man Who Always Takes the Last Train (1992)
- A Winter Elegy (1992)
- The Bikini Island Story (1992)
- The Black Hat (1992)
- Heartless Third Wharf (1993)
- Jamon Jamon Seoul (1994)
- Yellow Handkerchief (1995)
- Karuna (1996)
- Cue (1996)
- Boss (1996)
- Albatross (1996)
- The Rocket Is Launched (1997)
- Partner (1997)
- The Last Attempt (1998)
- Blues (1998)
- Jakarta (2000)
- My Boss, My Hero (2001)
- Four Toes (2002)
- Sex of Magic (2002)
- Sex Is Zero (2002)
- My Wife Is a Gangster 2 (2003)
- Wet Dreams 2 (2005)
- The Art of Seduction (2005)
- Oh! My God (2006)
- The Fox Family (2006)
- Hot for Teacher (2006)
- Garden Balsam (short film, 2007)
- Bravo My Life (2007)
- Sweet Fish (2011)
- A Year-End Medley (2021) – special appearance

=== Television series ===
- The Winter That Year Was warm (KBS, 1988)
- With Joy and Sadness (KBS, 1993)
- Police (KBS, 1994)
- Shooting (KBS, 1996)
- A Faraway Country (KBS2, 1996)
- Sprint (KBS, 1997)
- Hong Gil-dong (SBS, 1998)
- The Boss (MBC, 1998)
- Medical Center (SBS, 2000)
- Three Friends (MBC, 2001) (guest appearance)
- Rustic Period (SBS, 2002)
- Remember (MBC, 2002)
- Age of Warriors (KBS1, 2003)
- Damo (MBC, 2003)
- Apgujeong House (SBS, 2003)
- Jang Gil-san (SBS, 2004)
- I Am Sam (KBS2, 2007)
- Woman of Matchless Beauty, Park Jung-geum (MBC, 2008)
- My Precious You (KBS2, 2008)
- Marry Me, Mary! (KBS2, 2010)
- Warrior Baek Dong-soo (SBS, 2011)
- Lights and Shadows (MBC, 2011)
- Arang and the Magistrate (MBC, 2012)
- Marriage, Not Dating (tvN, 2014)
- The Family is Coming (SBS, 2015)
- Kill Me, Heal Me (MBC, 2015)
- The Rebel (MBC, 2017)
- Return (SBS, 2018)
- The Miracle We Met (KBS, 2018)
- Partners for Justice (MBC, 2018)

=== Variety show ===
- Star Junior Show (SBS, 2009)
- Hunters (SBS, 2009)
- I Need a Family - Season 4 (MBC Every 1, 2010)
- Brothers' Restaurant (SBSE!, 2010)
- Hello Pot (KBS, 2011)
- Truth Game (SBS, 2011)
- Star King (SBS, 2012)
- Top Gear Korea - Season 3 (XTM, 2012)
- Family's Dignity: Full House (KBS, 2013)

=== Music video appearances ===
- Jang Hye-jin - "Let's Not Run Into Each Other Again" (2009)

== Theater ==
- Guys and Dolls (1995)
- Thanks Honey (2009-2010)
- Peonies Blooming in the Market (2011)
- Coyote Ugly (2011)
- Running Man (Episode 90, 2012)
- Luv (2012)
- Roly-Poly (2012)
- Guys and Dolls (2013-2014)
- Five Course Love (2014)

== Awards ==
- 2002 SBS Drama Awards: Best Supporting Actor (Rustic Period)
- 2002 25th Golden Cinematography Awards: Most Popular Actor (My Boss, My Hero)
- 2003 SBS Drama Awards: Excellence Award, Actor in a Sitcom (Apgujeong House)
- 2013 SBS Entertainment Awards: Best Entertainer (Star King)
