= Shin Jai-ho =

South Korean filmmaker (born 1977)

- Born: 1977 (age 48–49); South Korea
- Other name: Shin Jae-ho
- Education: Seoul Institute of the Arts
- Occupations: Film director, screenwriter

Korean name
- Hangul: 신재호
- RR: Sin Jaeho
- MR: Sin Chaeho

Birth name
- Hangul: 신동엽
- RR: Sin Dongyeop
- MR: Sin Tongyŏp

Shin Jai-ho (Korean: 신재호; born 1977) is a South Korean film director and screenwriter. Shin debuted as a screenwriter in 2002 with the film Baby Alone and directed his first feature film 100 Days with Mr. Arrogant in 2004. In 2006, Shin was cited as the 14th most influential figure in Korean popular culture according to a survey conducted by the Herald Business Daily of the country's top 30 pop icons.

== Personal life ==
Shin graduated from Seoul Institute of the Arts, majoring in Creative Writing.

== Filmography ==
Feature films of Shin
Year	Title		Credited as			Ref.
Year	English	Korean	Director	Screenplay	Producer	Ref.
2000	Ditto	동감	No	No	No	Original Idea
2002	Baby Alone	유아독존	No	Yes	No	
2004	100 Days with Mr. Arrogant	내 사랑 싸가지	Yes	Yes	No	
2009	4th Period Mystery	4교시 추리영역	No	Yes	No	
2011	Super Monkey Returns	서유기 리턴즈	Yes	Yes	No	
2012	Wedding Scandal	웨딩스캔들	Yes	Yes	No	
2013	Days of Wrath	응징자	Yes	Yes	No	
2015	The Outsider: Mean Streets	따라지: 비열한 거리	Yes	No	No	
2015	Untouchable Lawman	치외법권	Yes	Yes	No	
2016	Duel: Final Round	대결	Yes	No	No	
2018	Gate	게이트	Yes	No	No	
2019	Days of Wrath 2	응징자 2	Yes	Yes	No	
2023	In Dreams	인드림	Yes	Yes	No	

== Accolades ==
=== Listicles ===
Name of publisher, year listed, name of listicle, and placement
Publisher	Year	Listicle	Placement	Ref.
Herald Business Daily	2006	Pop Culture Power Leader Big 30	14th	
