= Sex Is Zero 2 =

2007 film by Yoon Tae-yoon

- Theatrical poster
- Hangul: 색즉시공 2
- RR: Saekjeuksigong 2
- MR: Saekchŭksigong 2
- Directed by: Yoon Tae-yoon
- Written by: Yoon Je-kyoon
- Produced by: Yoon Je-kyoon
- Starring: Im Chang-jung; Song Ji-hyo
- Cinematography: Kim Yong-cheol; Choi JIn-woong
- Edited by: Jeong Jin-hee
- Music by: Lee Han-chul
- Distributed by: CJ Entertainment
- Release date: December 12, 2007
- Running time: 115 minutes
- Country: South Korea
- Language: Korean
- Box office: US$14,210,342

Sex Is Zero 2 is the 2007 sequel to the South Korean comedy film Sex Is Zero, and is the directorial debut of Yoon Tae-yoon. Starring Im Chang-jeong and Song Ji-hyo, the film reunites most of the cast from the original film, though Ha Ji-won only makes a cameo appearance. Sex Is Zero 2 was released in South Korea on 12 December 2007.

== Plot ==
Having broken up with his girlfriend, law student Eun-sik is keen to consummate a new relationship with Kyung-ah, a popular swimming champion with a painful past. Despite help from his friends, Eun-sik begins to doubt himself when Gi-joo, a suave prosecutor, tries to compete for Kyeong-ah's affections.

It was revealed that Kyung-ah was raped in high school, then attempted suicide. She is unable to engage with Eun-sik sexually, which frustrates him.

In the end, Kyung-ah is about to leave for America with Gi-joo but then realizes that she only loves Eun-sik.

== Cast ==
- Im Chang-jung as Eun-sik
- Song Ji-hyo as Kyung-ah
- Choi Sung-kook as Seong-gook
- Shin Yi as Kyeong-joo
- Yoo Chae-yeong as Yoo-mi
- Lee Hwa-seon as Yeong-chae
- Lee Sang-yoon as Gi-jo
- Kim Cheong as Kyeong-ah's mother
- Hong Ji-yeong as Bo-ra
- Seon Eun-jeong as Ji-hyeon
- Bae Geon-woo as Sang-woo
- Park Yeong-soo as Jong-min
- Lee Si-yeon as Dae-hak
- Myeong-gyu as Pervert
- Park Min-ah as Nurse
- Park Jae-woong as Nurse
- Choi In-sook as Dean
- Lee Jeong-hoon as Hall announcer
- Lee Jong-rae as Doctor
- Kim Hyung-il as Pervert
- Ha Ji-won as Eun-hyo (cameo)
- Denis Kang as himself (cameo)
- Yoon Je-kyoon as (uncredited cameo)

== Production ==
Sex Is Zero 2 was produced by Doosaboo Film with CJ Entertainment in charge of distribution. Filming commenced late July 2007 under first time director Yoon Tae-yoon, with Im Chang-jung reprising his role from the original Sex Is Zero as male protagonist Eun-sik. Other actors returning from the first film were Choi Sung-kook, Shin-ee and Yoo Chae-yeong, though the female lead was played by Song Ji-hyo in place of Ha Ji-won, with Ha making only a cameo appearance in the film's opening sequence.

At the film's press preview, director Yoon stated that, "the major appeal of 'Sex Is Zero 2' is not the sexy scenes but the comic relief embedded in the sexy images". Im Chang-jung credited the first film as being the point where he discovered his aptitude for acting, and said, "I believe this film is really meaningful for me, and I'm kind of supposed to feel more pressure, but strangely I didn't feel any, because I found the screenplay well organized and trusted in director Yoon".

Song Ji-hyo underwent two months of intensive swimming training for her role in the film. For one scene she had to sit at the bottom of a pool while her character brooded over her relationship troubles. This scene required ten retakes to get right, and while director Yoon had wanted to use a stunt double, Song felt it necessary to do it herself as the scene was "integral to the emotional development" of her character. She hoped that the film would project her screen image as being "friendlier, warmer and sweeter", saying, "Yes, this movie may be a sex comedy, but my character [Kyeong-ah] is the young and innocent foil, which is closer to my real self... Making this film has definitely allowed me to grow as an actress."

Sex Is Zero 2 gained significant media attention from the casting of transsexual actress Lee Si-yeon. Lee had appeared in the original film, providing comic relief as an effeminate male student, but underwent sex reassignment surgery in 2007. She made her surgery known to the public in November 2007 but was apprehensive about the response she would get from audiences, while officials for the film stated that they were "extremely cautious about handling the issue for fear that she may be affected negatively by what people and the media say". Lee received support from her co-stars, in particular Shin-ee.

French–Korean mixed martial artist Denis Kang made a special appearance in the film as himself.

== Release ==
Sex Is Zero 2 was released in South Korea on 12 December 2007. On its opening weekend the film was ranked second at the domestic box office, receiving 584,284 admissions and grossing US$3,273,040; as of 27 January 2008 it had grossed a total of $14,210,342. Sex Is Zero 2 accumulated a total of 2,088,940 admissions nationwide to make it the tenth best selling Korean film of 2007, though this figure was somewhat less than the number of tickets sold by the original film in 2002–3.

Sex Is Zero 2 was released on DVD on 27 August 2008.

== Critical response ==
In a review for The Korea Times, Lee Hyo-won was critical of the film and compared it unfavourably to the original, stating that "the makers of the film try too hard to be outrageous... what had been endearingly eccentric in the first film becomes simply freaky", going on to add that "Another downfall of Zero 2 is the tacky melodrama. [Kyeong-ah]'s dark past, while adding some dimension to her relationship with Eun-sik, lacks substance. But the critical blow comes with the absence of genuine comedy." By contrast, James Mudge of BeyondHollywood.com regarded the film as "one of the funnier Korean comedies of recent years", and also praised the heavy drama of the final act, saying, "Surprisingly, this works very well... [Director] Yoon ensures that both [Eun-sik] and [Kyeong-ah] never become jokes themselves, retaining a modicum of believability and depth, and with their relationship somehow managing to come across as being sweet and genuine." Tan Heng Hau of movieXclusive.com found the film's sex gags to be "hilariously executed", and applauded the director and screenwriter "for not letting the sex jokes overshadow the romantic elements of the story and keeping the viewers enticed to see what happens... in the end." The review also commended the acting skills of the cast, saying, "Their comedic performance is excellent while for the romantic scenes, [Im] Chang-jung and Song Ji-hyo convey enough emotions to make viewers care for their well-developed characters", though it was noted that Lim looked visibly older than his fellow cast members.
