= Choi Sung-kook =

South Korean actor

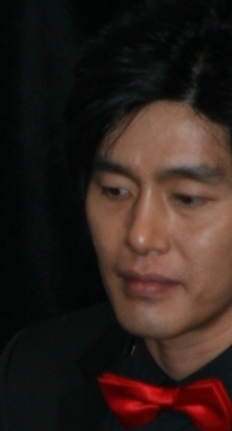
- Choi in February 2009
- Born: 2 December 1970 (age 55); South Korea
- Occupation: Actor
- Years active: 1995–present
- Agent: Management Yul
- Spouse: Ahn Hye-jin (m. 2022)
- Children: 2

Korean name
- Hangul: 최성국
- RR: Choe Seongguk
- MR: Ch'oe Sŏngguk

Choi Sung-kook (Korean: 최성국; born 2 December 1970) is a South Korean actor.

== Career ==
Choi developed an interest in acting from a young age. He studied drama at Seoul University of Arts in the 1990s and launched his career in 1995.

== Personal life ==
In September 2022, Choi's agency announced that Choi was dating a non-celebrity girlfriend who was 24 years younger than him. They married on November 5 in Seoul. On May 15, 2023, Choi confirmed his wife was pregnant. His wife gave birth to a son on September 23, 2023.

== Filmography ==
=== Film ===
Year	Title	Role
2002	Sex Is Zero	Choi Seong-guk
2003	Romantic Assassins	
2005	Love in Magic	Cameo
2005	Lee Dae-ro Can't Die	
2006	Oh! My God	Jung-hwan
2006	Now and Forever	
2007	Master Kims	
2007	Underground Rendezvous	Nice man (Special appearance)
2007	Sex Is Zero 2	Seong-gook
2008	Love is Beautiful	Kim Dae-han
2009	Oh! My God 2	Im Jung-hwan
2014	Love Match	Hae-joo
2017	Oh! My God Returns	Sang-hoon

=== Television series ===
Year	Title	Role
2002	Dae Bak Family	
2010	Playful Kiss	Kwang Kyung-soo
2010	Roller Coaster Plus Date Big Bang	Choi Seong-gook
2012	Ohlala Couple	Lee Baek-ho
2014	Endless Love	Jo Won-gyu
2014	Hi! School: Love On	Angel
2016	The Gentlemen of Wolgyesu Tailor Shop	Park Tae-seop (Special appearance)
2016	Thumping Spike 2	Volleyball coach

=== Television shows ===
Year	Title	Role	Notes	Ref.
2022	Lovers of Joseon	Cast Member		
2022–2023	Lovers of Joseon	Host	with Park Kyung-lim, Park Soo-hong and Oh Na-mi	

== Awards and nominations ==
Year	Award	Category	Nominated work	Result
2002	SBS Entertainment Awards	Excellence Award, Actor in a Sitcom	Dae Bak Family	Won
2016	SBS Entertainment Awards	Entertainment Scene Stealer Award	Flaming Youth	Won
2017	SBS Entertainment Awards	Best Couple Award	Flaming Youth	Nominated
