= Miracle on 1st Street =

- Theatrical release poster
- Hangul: 1번가의 기적
- Hanja: 1番街의 奇蹟
- RR: 1beongaui gijeok
- MR: 1pŏn'gaŭi kijŏk
- Directed by: Yoon Je-kyoon
- Written by: Yoo Seong-hyeob
- Produced by: Yoon Je-kyoon; Heo Tae-gu
- Starring: Im Chang-jung; Ha Ji-won
- Cinematography: Kim Young-chul
- Edited by: Shin Min-kyung
- Music by: Lee Byung-woo
- Distributed by: CJ Entertainment
- Release date: February 15, 2007
- Running time: 113 minutes
- Country: South Korea
- Language: Korean
- Budget: $3.7 million
- Box office: $16.1 million

Miracle on 1st Street is a 2007 South Korean comedy-drama film directed by Yoon Je-kyoon. It reunites Yoon with actors Im Chang-jung and Ha Ji-won, the stars of his earlier film Sex Is Zero. With 2,750,457 admissions, Miracle on 1st Street was the fiftth-highest-grossing Korean film of 2007.

== Plot ==
Pil-je is a gangster who has been sent by his bosses to evict the residents of a poor neighborhood on the edge of Seoul, so that their homes can make way for some new luxury apartments. But after he befriends some of the locals, including female boxer Myung-ran and a group of young children, he starts to have a change of heart.

== Cast ==
- Im Chang-jung as Pil-je
- Ha Ji-won as Myung-ran
- Joo Hyun as Director Lee
- Jung Doo-hong as Myung-ran's father
- Lee Hoon as Tae-suk
- Kang Ye-won as Seon-joo
- Park Chang-ik as Il-dong
- Park Yoo-seon as Yi-soon
- Ko Tae-ho as Deok-goo
- Kim Hee-won as Director Kim

== Release ==
It was a huge hit with 2.75 million viewers nationwide, and in the film, the redevelopment area is shown as the first site of Cheongsong Village, which was actually filmed in the water valley of Busan. Since then, the village has become famous in its own way, with murals being painted. There are some people who are confused with the gift of Room 7.
