= Gate (film) =

- Theatrical poster
- Hangul: 게이트
- RR: Geiteu
- MR: Keit'ŭ
- Directed by: Shin Jai-ho
- Written by: Lee Hyun-chol; Song Chang-yong
- Produced by: Oh Pil-jin
- Starring: Jung Ryeo-won; Im Chang-jung; Jung Sang-hoon; Lee Geung-young; Lee Moon-sik; Kim Do-hoon
- Cinematography: Lee Sang-min
- Edited by: Steve Choi
- Music by: Im Chang-jung
- Distributed by: Joy N Cinema
- Release date: February 28, 2018
- Running time: 92 minutes
- Country: South Korea
- Language: Korean
- Box office: US$763,899

Gate (Korean: 게이트) is a 2018 South Korean crime comedy film directed by Shin Jai-ho.

== Cast ==
- Jung Ryeo-won as So-eun
- Im Chang-jung as Gyu-cheol
- Jung Sang-hoon as Min-wook
- Lee Geung-young as Jang-choon
- Lee Moon-sik as Cheol-soo
- Kim Do-hoon as Won-ho
- Sunwoo Eun-sook as Ok-ja
- Jung Kyung-soon as Ae-ri
- Kim Bo-min as Mi-ae
- Lim Chul-hyung as Eun-tak
- Ko Dong-ok as Kwang-ho
- Kim Hyo-min as Nam-ho
- Han Yi-jin as Dong-goo
- Yun Song-a as Kim Won-jang (special appearance)
- Choi Yun-seul as Announcer (special appearance)

== Background ==
The film was reportedly inspired by the Choi Soon-sil political affair, which erupted in end-2016.
