= Lee Jin-kwon =

South Korean actor and singer

- Born: Lee Jin-kwon; 22 January 1991 (age 35); Jeongeup, South Korea
- Other name: Lee Jin Gwon
- Education: Inductive University Broadcasting
- Occupations: Actor; singer; model
- Years active: 2013–present
- Known for: The Magician; Who Are You: School 2015; Untouchable Lawman

Lee Jin-kwon (born 22 January 1991) is a South Korean actor and singer. He is best known for his supporting roles in Untouchable Lawman, The Magician and Gangnam Blues. Lee also appeared in the famous and popular school drama series, Who Are You: School 2015 as Jin Kwon.

== Filmography ==
=== Television ===
Year	Title	Role	Ref.
2014	Plus Nine Boys		
2015	Hogu's Love	Man running away with comic books	
2015	Who Are You: School 2015	Jin Kwon	
2015	Mrs. Cop	Lee Man Young	
2015–2016	Reply 1988	Bad student	
2016	All About My Mom		
2016	Signal		
2016	Doctors	Kim Soo-cheol's friend	
2016	Madame Antoine: The Love Therapist		
2016	Mrs. Cop 2	Lee Man Young	
2016	Uncontrollably Fond		
2016–2017	Dr. Romantic		
2017	Innocent Defendant		
2017	Romance Full of Life		
2017	Andante		
2018	Live		
2018	Clean with Passion for Now	President Yang's assistant	
2019	The Banker	Mr. Jeong	
2019	The Great Show	Loan Shark	
2020	The Uncanny Counter	Subordinate	
2021	The Penthouse Season 3: War in Life	Inmate	
2021	Chimera	Prosecutor	
2022	Juvenile Justice	Internet Cafe employee	
2022	Alchemy of Souls Season 2: Light and Shadow	Gambling hall doorman	
2023	Poong, the Joseon Psychiatrist Season 2	Palanquin group	
2023	Taxi Driver Season 2	No. 17	
2024	High School Return of a Gangster	Nurse	

=== Film ===
Year	Title	Role	Language	Ref.
2014	Pick Up Artist	Waiter	Korean	
2015	Gangnam Blues	Myeongdong Gang	Korean	
2015	Unwanted Brother (2015)		Korean	
2015	Untouchable Lawman	Ma Neul's right-hand man	Korean	
2015	The Magician	Hwan Hee's equipment team member	Korean	
