= Secret (2000 TV series) =

South Korean television drama

- Promotional poster
- Hangul: 비밀
- Hanja: 秘密
- RR: Bimil
- MR: Pimil
- Written by: Jung Yoo-kyung
- Directed by: Kim Sa-hyun
- Starring: Kim Ha-neul; Ha Ji-won; Ryu Si-won; Kim Min-jong
- Country of origin: South Korea
- Original language: Korean
- No. of episodes: 18

Production
- Producer: Park Jong

Original release
- Network: Munhwa Broadcasting Corporation
- Release: September 13 – November 9, 2000

Secret (Korean: 비밀) is a South Korean television series starring Kim Ha-neul, Ha Ji-won, Ryu Si-won and Kim Min-jong. It aired on MBC from September 13 to November 9 on Wednesdays and Thursdays at 21:00 for 18 episodes.

== Plot ==
Ji-eun and Hee-jung live with their father Jong-man, a truck driver. When Ji-eun finds out her sister is the daughter of a famous fashion designer, she takes over her place and, led by jealousy, commits many misdeeds.

== Cast ==
- Kim Ha-neul as Lee Hee-jung
- Ha Ji-won as Lee Ji-eun
- Ryu Si-won as Kim Jun-ho
- Kim Min-jong as Cho Young-min
- Park Geun-hyung as Lee Jong-man
- Lee Ah-hyun as Team Captain Ha Mi-ra
- Kim Hyo-jin as Cho Young-ran (Young-min's sister)
- Lee Dong-wook as Kang Hyun-soo
- Lee Hwi-hyang as Yoon Myung-ae
- Han Mi as Hyun-joo
