= Shin Yi =

South Korean actress (born 1978)

- Born: Jang Seung-hee; 5 December 1978 (age 47); Daegu, South Korea
- Other names: Jang Seung-hui, Shin Ee
- Education: Daekyeung University (Department of Theater and Film)
- Occupation: Actress
- Years active: 1998–present
- Agent: Star it Entertainment
- Known for: Grand Prince; Joseon Survival Period; When I Was Most Beautiful
- Children: 4

Shin Yi is a South Korean actress known for her drama roles in Grand Prince, Joseon Survival Period and When I Was Most Beautiful. She has also appeared in movies such as My Boyfriend Is Type B, Shinsukki Blues and Everybody Has Secrets.

== Biography and career ==
Shin Yi, also known as Jang Seung Hee, is a South Korean actress. She was born on November 6, 1978, in Daegu, South Korea. She attended Daekyeung University to study theater and film and graduated in 1998. She changed her name from Jang Seung-hee to Shin Yi and made her acting debut in 1998. She starred in a supporting role in the film Everybody Has Secrets. After that, she has appeared in numerous films and several television dramas, including Something Happened in Bali for which she was awarded Best Supporting Actress. She has also appeared in Grand Prince, Joseon Survival Period, and When I Was Most Beautiful. She was nominated for Best Supporting Actress in her role in the film My Boyfriend Is Type B.

== Personal life ==
Shin Yi is married and has four children: one son and three daughters.

== Filmography ==
=== Television series ===
Year	Title	Role	Ref.
2004	Something Happened in Bali	Park Mi-hee	
2007	Company Love	Ji-ah	
2009	The Partner	Choi Sun-yi	
2014	Miss Hyena	Son Jeong-hee	
2014	KBS Drama Special: "Suspicious Ward No. 7"	Lee Soo-jin	
2015	What on Earth is Going on?	Min-ah	
2015	Miss Mamma Mia	Seo Ha-roo's biological mother	
2017	Teacher Oh Soon-nam	So Myung-ja	
2018	Grand Prince	Court Lady Jang	
2019	Joseon Survival Period	Kisaeng Haeng-soo	
2020	When I Was Most Beautiful	Oh Ji-Young	

=== Film ===
Year	Title	Role
1998	Whispering Corridors	Delinquent
1999	Doctor K	Sae-yeon's friend
2000	Truth Game	Jin-seon
2001	Yellow Hair 2	Y
2002	Sex Is Zero	Park Kyung-joo
2003	Romantic Assassin	Shin-yi
2003	The Greatest Expectation	Sung-hee
2004	Dead Friend	Mi-kyung
2004	Everybody Has Secrets	Woman who is about to break up
2004	To Catch a Virgin Ghost	Ghost
2004	Shinsukki Blues	Miss Jang
2005	Daddy-Long-Legs	Kang Jong-jong
2005	My Boyfriend Is Type B	Chae-young
2005	A Bold Family	Choon-ja
2005	Marrying the Mafia II	Oh Soon-nam
2006	Oh! My God	Ko Eun-joo
2006	Marrying the Mafia III	Oh Soon-nam
2006	Who Slept With Her	Urologist
2007	The Worst Guy Ever	Woman on blind date
2007	Sex Is Zero 2	Park Kyung-joo
2008	Zig Zag Love	Bae-shin
2008	What Happened Last Night?	Joon-hwan's wife
2010	Sooni, Where are You	Rami
2011	Guest 1, The first story	Na-yeon
2013	Holly	Holly

=== Variety show ===
Year	Title	Role	Ref.
2015	King of Mask Singer	Contestant (Mirror Ball) Episode 247	

== Awards and nominations ==
- 2004 SBS Drama Awards: Awarded for Female Supporting Actress in Something Happened in Bali
- 2005 Grand Bell Awards: Nominated for Best Supporting Actress in My Boyfriend Is Type B
