= Yoon Je-kyoon =

South Korean film director (born 1969)

- 윤제균
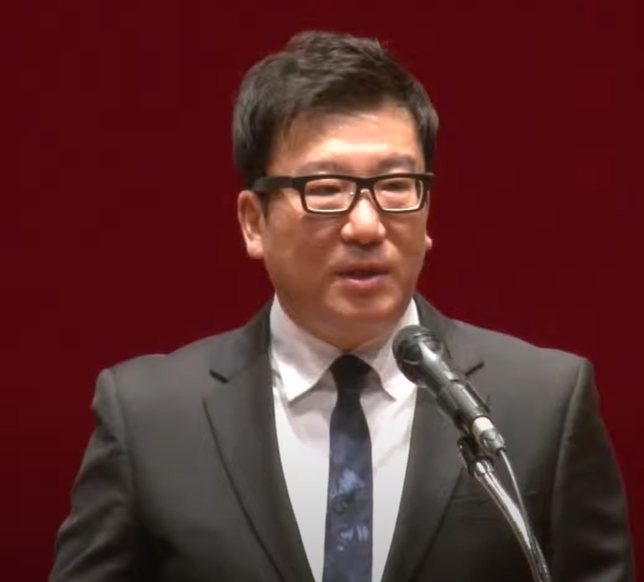
- Born: May 14, 1969 (age 57); Busan, South Korea
- Other name: J.K. Youn
- Education: Korea University
- Occupations: Director; producer; screenwriter
- Years active: 2001–present
- Employer: CJ ENM Studios
- Notable work: Sex Is Zero; Tidal Wave; Ode to My Father; Confidential Assignment
- Style: Gross out comedies; Action; Disaster film; Drama

Korean name
- Hangul: 윤제균
- RR: Yun Jegyun
- MR: Yun Chegyun

Yoon Je-kyoon (Korean: 윤제균; born May 14, 1969) is a South Korean film director, screenwriter, and producer. His directorial debut My Boss, My Hero (2001) is about a gangster who is sent back to school, while Sex Is Zero (2002) has been compared with American Pie (1999).

He became known through his disaster film Tidal Wave (2009), which has been billed as South Korea's first disaster film, had a $16 million budget, and was nominated for several awards—including Best Film and Best Director—at the 2009 Black Dragon Awards; the film won the award for Best Special Effects. Through the film, he became the 5th film director in the history of Korea to surpass 10 million viewers. In 2014, another Yoon-directed film, Ode to My Father, also surpassed 10 million viewers.

== Career ==
Yoon was born on May 14, 1969, in Busan. He graduated from Korea University Department of Economics in 1996. In 1997, he won the highest award in the World Internet Advertising Competition, when he worked at the advertising agency LG Ad.

Yoon made his debut in the film industry by winning the grand prize of the scenario contest (moon trip) hosted by Taechang Heungup. He made his directorial debut in 2001 with My Boss, My Hero. He has also written many scripts, and became CEO of the film company JK Film (formerly Dusabu Film).

Through the film Tidal Wave, he became the 5th film director in the history of Korea to surpass 10 million viewers, and currently, Tidal Wave was ranked 17th in list of box office of South Korean films.

In 2014, Yoon direct film Ode to My Father. The film achieved commercial success with surpassing 10 million viewers. Currently, the film is ranked 4th in list of top-grossing of South Korean films. The film was also critically acclaimed and brought many nominations and awards for Yoon.

In 2016, CJ ENM acquired a 51 percent stake in JK Film, making it a subsidiary of the company. CJ ENM plans to expand beyond their existing investment and distribution by acquiring a film production company and venturing into film production directly. With CJ ENM's capital and overseas network, JK Film is also expected to seek entry into the overseas market.

In July 2022, Yoon became the president and CEO of CJ ENM Studios, the newly-launched production subsidiary of CJ ENM. On October 25, 2022, CJ ENM announced its plan to integrate other production affiliates, centered on its affiliate CJ ENM Studios, to create synergy by combining their content production capabilities. Yoon sold his 2,388 shares of JK Film, to CJ ENM for a total of 5.1 billion won. After the merger and acquisition, JK Film became a label under CJ ENM Studios.

== Filmography ==
=== Director and writer ===
| Year | Title | | Credited as | | | Ref. |
| Year | English | Korean | Director | Screenwriter | Producer | Ref. |
|---|---|---|---|---|---|---|
| 2000 | Black Honeymoon | 신혼여행 | No | Yes | No | |
| 2001 | My Boss, My Hero | 두사부일체 | Yes | Yes | No | |
| 2002 | Can't Live Without Robbery | 도둑맞곤 못살아 | No | Yes | No | |
| 2002 | Sex Is Zero | 색즉시공 | Yes | Yes | No | |
| 2003 | Romantic Assassin | 낭만자객 | Yes | Yes | No | |
| 2007 | Miracle on 1st Street | 1번가의 기적 | Yes | No | Yes | |
| 2007 | Sex Is Zero 2 | 색즉시공 2 | No | Yes | Yes | |
| 2009 | Tidal Wave | 해운대 | Yes | Yes (Note: with Kim Hwi) | Yes (Note: with Lee Sang-yong and Gil Yeong-min) | |
| 2010 | Harmony | 하모니 | No | Yes (Note: with Lee Seung-yeon and Kim Hwi) | Yes (Note: with Kim Nam-su and Jeong Jae-won) | |
| 2011 | Sector 7 | 7광구 | No | Yes | Yes | |
| 2012 | Dancing Queen | 댄싱퀸 | No | Yes (Note: with Lee Seok-hoon, Park Soo-jin, and Kim Hwi) | Yes (Note: with Kim Nam-soo) | |
| 2013 | The Spy: Undercover Operation | 스파이 | No | Yes (Note: with Park Soo-jin) | Yes | |
| 2014 | Ode to My Father | 국제시장 | Yes | Yes | Yes (Note: with Park Ji-seong) | |
| 2015 | The Himalayas | 히말라야 | No | Story (Note: screenplay by Min Ji-eun and Soo Oh; story by Lee Seok-hoon, Yoon Je-kyoon, Kang Dae-kyu, Lee Jong-suk, and Park Soo-jin) | Yes (Note: with Joo Seung-hwan) | |
| 2020 | Pawn | 담보 | No | Yes (Note: with Son Joo-yeon) | Yes | |
| 2022 | Hero | 영웅 | Yes | Yes (Note: with Han Ah-reum) | No | |
| TBA | Kung Fu Robot | | Yes | No | No | |

=== Producing credits ===
| Year | Title | | Director |
| Year | English | Korean | Director |
|---|---|---|---|
| 2005 | All for Love | 내 생애 가장 아름다운 일주일 | Min Kyu-dong |
| 2009 | Secret | 시크릿 | Yoon Jae-goo |
| 2010 | My Dear Desperado | 내 깡패 같은 애인 | Kim Kwang-sik |
| 2011 | Quick | 퀵 | Jo Beom-goo |
| 2016 | Like for Likes | 좋아해줘 | Park Hyun-jin |
| 2017 | Confidential Assignment | 공조 | Kim Sung-hoon |
| 2018 | Keys to the Heart | 그것만이 내 세상 | Choi Sung-hyun |
| 2018 | The Negotiation | 협상 | Lee Jong-seok |

== Awards and nominations ==
Awards and nominations
| Year | Award ceremony | Category | Recipients | Result | Ref. |
|---|---|---|---|---|---|
| 2009 | 30th Blue Dragon Film Awards | Best Film | Tidal Wave | Nominated | |
| 2009 | 30th Blue Dragon Film Awards | Best Director | Tidal Wave | Nominated | |
| 2009 | 30th Blue Dragon Film Awards | Audience Choice Award for Most Popular Film | Tidal Wave | Won | |
| 2009 | 18th Buil Film Awards | Best Director | Tidal Wave | Won | |
| 2009 | 12th Director's Cut Awards | Best Producer | Tidal Wave | Won | |
| 2009 | 46th Grand Bell Awards | Best Film | Tidal Wave | Nominated | |
| 2009 | 46th Grand Bell Awards | Best Director | Tidal Wave | Nominated | |
| 2009 | 46th Grand Bell Awards | Best Planning | Tidal Wave | Won | |
| 2009 | 46th Paeksang Arts Awards | Grand Prize | Tidal Wave | Won | |
| 2009 | 46th Paeksang Arts Awards | Best Film | Tidal Wave | Nominated | |
| 2009 | 46th Paeksang Arts Awards | Best Director | Tidal Wave | Nominated | |
| 2015 | 10th Max Movie Awards | Best Film | Ode to My Father | Nominated | |
| 2015 | 10th Max Movie Awards | Best Director | Ode to My Father | Nominated | |
| 2015 | 20th Chunsa Film Art Awards | Special Audience Award for Best Film | Ode to My Father | Won | |
| 2015 | 9th Asian Film Awards | Best Film | Ode to My Father | Nominated | |
| 2015 | 17th Udine Far East Film Festival | Audience Award | Ode to My Father | Won | |
| 2015 | 51st Baeksang Arts Awards | Best Director | Ode to My Father | Nominated | |
| 2015 | 10th APN Awards (Note: Asia-Pacific Producers Network Award) | Recipient | Ode to My Father | Won | |
| 2015 | 24th Buil Film Awards | Buil Readers' Jury Award | Ode to My Father | Won | |
| 2015 | 35th Korean Association of Film Critics Awards | Top 10 Films of the Year | Ode to My Father | Won | |
| 2015 | 52nd Grand Bell Awards | Best Film | Ode to My Father | Won | |
| 2015 | 52nd Grand Bell Awards | Best Director | Ode to My Father | Won | |
| 2015 | 36th Blue Dragon Film Awards | Best Film | Ode to My Father | Nominated | |
| 2015 | 36th Blue Dragon Film Awards | Best Director | Ode to My Father | Nominated | |
| 2015 | 36th Blue Dragon Film Awards | Audience Choice Award for Most Popular Film | Ode to My Father | Won | |

== See also ==
- List of Korean film directors
- Cinema of Korea
