= Im Chang-jung =

South Korean actor and singer (born 1973)

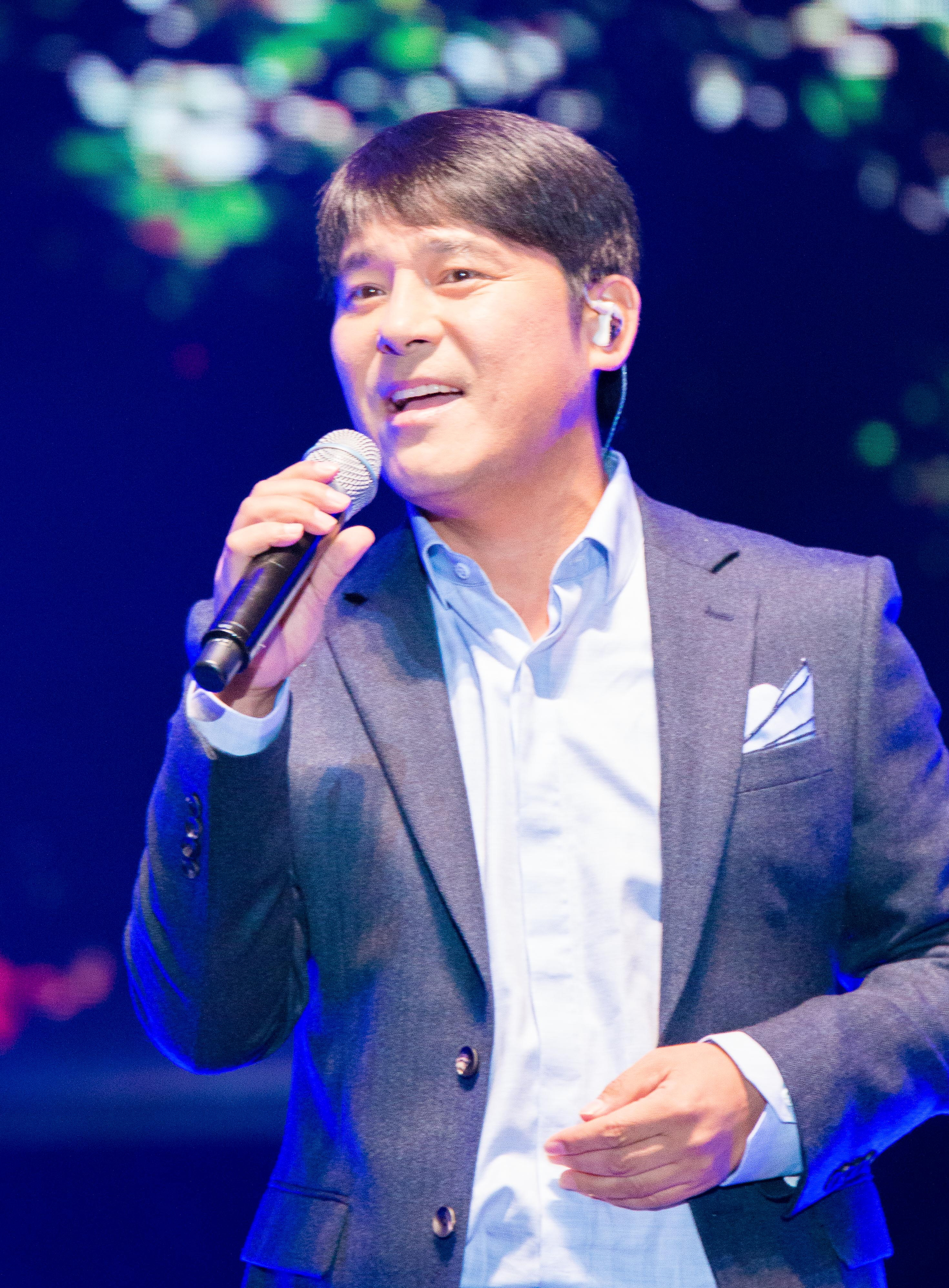
- Im in 2016
- Born: November 30, 1973 (age 52); Icheon, South Korea
- Education: ChungAng University – Theater and Film
- Occupations: Singer-songwriter; actor
- Years active: 1990–present
- Agent: Yes Im Entertainment
- Spouses: Kim Hyun-joo (m. 2006; div. 2013); Seo Ha-yan (m. 2017)
- Children: 5

Korean name
- Hangul: 임창정
- Hanja: 任昌丁
- RR: Im Changjeong
- MR: Im Ch'angjŏng

Im Chang-jung (Korean: 임창정; born November 30, 1973) is a South Korean singer-songwriter and actor. He is often referred by Koreans as "the original multi-entertainer" for being active in all three fields: music, film and entertainment. He made his acting debut in 1990 and his singing debut in 1995. Im has since released 17 full-length albums and is known for his hit songs that are vocally challenging to sing. He is the only artist in South Korea who has songs that reached number one on the local music charts in the 1990s, 2000s, and 2010s. He was selected as Singer of the Year and his song "The Love I Committed" was selected as Song of the Year in the surveys conducted by Gallup Korea in 2016.

== Personal life ==
Im married professional golfer Kim Hyun-joo in 2006. The couple, who have three sons together, divorced in 2013. Im married a woman named Seo Ha-yan in 2017. The couple have 2 children together.

On November 9, 2021 it was confirmed that Im had tested positive for COVID-19, and has since halted all promotions for his 17th album Nothing Special with the Day.

== Discography ==
=== Studio albums ===
Title	Album details	Peak chart positions	Sales
Title	Album details	KOR	Sales
Already to Me (이미 나에게로)	Released: April 1, 1995; Label: KingPin; Formats: CD, cassette	No data	No data
Because I'm Not with You	Released: May 10, 1996; Label: KingPin; Formats: CD, cassette	No data	No data
Again	Released: May 16, 1997; Label: Interpark; Formats: CD, cassette	No data	No data
Become a Star (별이 되어)	Released: April 13, 1998; Label: Cheonil; Formats: CD, cassette	5	KOR: 400,273+
Story Of...	Released: March 29, 1999; Label: Cheonil; Formats: CD, cassette	2	KOR: 472,979+
White	Released: February 10, 2000; Label: Cheonil; Formats: CD, cassette	2	KOR: 560,228+
www.love.7th	Released: November 1, 2000; Label: Seoul Records; Formats: CD, cassette	2	KOR: 463,373+
Different Color	Released: July 25, 2001; Label: Laful Entertainment; Formats: CD, cassette; Track listing: 1. Goodbye August (8월에 이별); 2. Real Love; 3. Foolish (미련); 4. I Think That All Day (온종일 하는 생각); 5. Legends Of The Fall (가을의 전설); 6. Why Wait (기다리는 이유); 7. Parting (이별); 8. The Day She Lost Contact (날 버린 그녀가 요즘 연락을 한다); 9. Comfort (위로); 10. Not Yet In Me (내안에 아직); 11. I Miss You (보고싶어); 12. What! What! (뭔데! 뭔데!); 13. I Deserve You (너에게 모자란 나); 14. Wishes (바램); 15. Say It (말해요); 16. Epilogue (에필로그)	2	KOR: 389,369+
C.J.2002	Released: April 26, 2002; Label: Laful Entertainment; Formats: CD, cassette; Track listing: 1. Sunshower (여우비); 2. No Choice; 3. Sad Soliloquy (슬픈 혼잣말); 4. You As You (너를 너로써); 5. Love Punch (러브 편치); 6. Send Me (나를 보내며); 7. Leave Me One (내게 남을 한사람); 8. Sad And Good Lover (슬퍼도 좋은 연인); 9. One Day; 10. Leave (떠나라); 11. Sad Soliloquy (슬픈 혼잣말) (Inst.)	3	KOR: 211,103+
Bye	Released: June 5, 2003; Label: Warner Music Korea; Formats: CD, cassette; Track listing: 1. Misunderstanding (오해); 2. A Shot of Soju (소주 한 잔); 3. Scattered Days (흩어진 나날들); 4. I'm going (내가 가요); 5. Why! (왜!); 6. I Have A Lover (난 연인이 있다); 7. Bye; 8. Advice (조언); 9. The Next You Want (니 옆이고 싶어서); 10. Already With Me (이미 나에게로) (Remix); 11. My Love (나의 연인) (Remix); 12. A Shot of Soju (소주 한 잔) (Inst.)	2	KOR: 99,696+
Return to My World	Released: March 10, 2009; Label: LOEN Entertainment; Format: CD; Track listing: 1. You And Others (너란 사람은); 2. If you want or not (원하던 안 원하던); 3. Long time no see (오랜만이야); 4. Then A Miss (그때가 그리워요); 5. I Think Your Laughing Again (그대 생각하며 한번 웃고); 6. Marriage Blues (결혼전야); 7. Deceased's Name In Your Heart (가슴에 고인 이름); 8. To Hyun Ju (현주에게); 9. Sad Lovers (슬픈 연인); 10. Something Not Alone (혼자가 아닌 걸); 11. To Your Ex-Boyfriend; 12. In The Club	3	No data
Ordinary Song, Ordinary Melody (흔한 노래... 흔한 멜로디...)	Released: March 20, 2014; Label: NH Media; Formats: CD, digital download; Track listing: 1. It Will Be Sent (보내야 했을까); 2. Which Day (어느 하루가); 3. Ordinary Song (흔한 노래); 4. Fool (바보); 5. Forget Death (죽어라 잊어도); 6. Reveal (토로 [吐露]); 7. Your Happiness (너는 행복); 8. The Last Handshake (마지막 악수); 9. When We Broke Up (우리가 헤어질 때); 10. Happy Man (행복한 남자); 11. Your Smile (너의 미소); 12. Shall We Dance (임박사와 함께 춤을); 13. Which Day (어느 하루가) (Inst.); 14. Ordinary Song (흔한 노래) (Inst.); 15. Shall We Dance (임박사와 함께 춤을) (Inst.)	8	KOR: 6,187+
I'm	Released: September 6, 2016; Label: NH Media; Formats: CD, digital download; Track listing: 1. I'll Sing Again (노래 한번 할게요); 2. After Parting (이별 후); 3. Stop There (그 곳에 멈춰서); 4. Reconciliation (화해); 5. Now Let Me Be (이제 날 놓아줘); 6. Most Beautiful Time In Life (내 생에 가장 아름다운); 7. Put Down (그마저 내려놓는); 8. There Is Another Inspiring Way (또 설레이는 이 길); 9. The Sun (순심이); 10. You Go Up (너에게 달려간다); 11. The Love That I Committed (내가 저지른 사랑); 12. Only One In The World (세상에 하나뿐인 나); 13. The Love That I Committed (내가 저지른 사랑) (Inst.); 14. Although Time Passed (지나고도 같은 오늘) (Inst.)	2	KOR: 7,665+
There Has Never Been a Day I Haven't Loved You (하루도 그대를 사랑하지 않은 적이 없었다)	Released: September 19, 2018; Label: NH Media; Formats: CD, digital download; Track listing: 1. Karaoke (노래방); 2. Please Don't Share (나눠갖지 말아요); 3. There Has Never Been A Day That I Haven't Loved You (하루도 그대를 사랑하지 않은 적이 없었다); 4. From Now On (이젠 그러려고); 5. The Day I Called Today (지금이라 부르던 그때); 6. Her (그 사람); 7. Looks Good (예쁘더라); 8. Friends 10 Years, Love 1 Year (친구 10년 사랑 1년); 9. Same Day As Yesterday (Reminisce [지나고도 같은 오늘 (또 생각이나서)]); 10. Love Again (또 다시 사랑) (2018 Ver.); 11. That Person Is Me (나란놈이란) (2018 Ver.); 12. Leave Me Alone (그냥 냅둬); 13. There Has Never Been A Day That I Haven't Loved You (하루도 그대를 사랑하지 않은 적이 없었다) (Inst.); 14. Leave Me Alone (그냥 냅둬) (Inst.)	14	KOR: 2,343+
Never Ending (십삼월)	Released: September 6, 2019; Label: NH Media; Formats: CD, digital download; Track listing: 1. All My Life (일월); 2. Love Letter (이월); 3. Dear You (삼월); 4. Empty (사월); 5. May Be (오월); 6. Stranger (유월); 7. Last Summer (칠월); 8. Moon Blue (팔월); 9. September Song (구월); 10. Mistakes (시월); 11. Again (십일월); 12. Happy Ending (십이월); 13. Never Ending (십삼월); 14. Never Ending (십삼월) (Inst.); 15. September Song (구월) (Inst.)	8	KOR: 4,894+
Love Should Not Be Harsh on You (힘든건 사랑이 아니다)	Released: October 19, 2020; Label: YES IM Entertainment; Formats: CD, digital download; Track listing: 1. Love Should Not Be Harsh On You (힘든 건 사랑이 아니다); 2. Already Forgot You (이미 널 잊었어); 3. The Little Things (소확행); 4. Flower Path (꽃길을 걸어요); 5. I Wanna Go Back (돌아가고 싶다); 6. Not Sure If You Are Okay (괜찮은지 몰라서); 7. Where Are We (우리는 어디에); 8. LOL (ㅎ ㅎ ㅎ); 9. Young Moments of My Love (젊은 날 그 사람); 10. Letting Go (널 버릴 거야); 11. 3rd Batter Up (3번 타자); 12. Not Sure if You Are Okay (with Sunmin) (괜찮은지 몰라서); 13. Love Like Magic (내 사랑 마법자); 14. Love Should Not Be Harsh on You (힘든 건 사랑이 아니다) (Inst.); 15. Love Like Magic (내 사랑 마법자) (Inst.)	21	KOR: 2,556+
Nothing Special with the Day (별거 없던 그 하루로)	Released: November 1, 2021; Label: YES IM Entertainment; Formats: CD, digital download; Track listing: 1. Nothing Special with the Day (별거 없던 그 하루로); 2. Fortunate (다행); 3. Living As by My Side (내 곁으로 사는 건); 4. Warm Words (따듯한 말 한마디); 5. I Am (나); 6. Our Beginning (우리의 첫 장); 7. The Gift (선물); 8. The Reason Why I'm Alone (내가 혼자인 이유); 9. I Can Stand It (버틸만해); 10. I Hate Trot (나는 트로트가 싫어요); 11. Nothing Special with the Day (별거 없던 그 하루로) (Inst.); 12. I Hate Trot (나는 트로트가 싫어요) (Inst.)	56	No data

=== Extended plays ===
Title	Album details	Peak chart positions	Sales
Title	Album details	KOR	Sales
Best Man (친한사람)	Released: November 24, 2014; Label: NH Media; Formats: CD, digital download	14	KOR: 1,649+
Love Again (또 다시 사랑)	Released: September 22, 2015; Label: NH Media; Formats: CD, digital download	8	KOR: 3,551+
Do You Know That Person? (그 사람을 아나요)	Released: October 23, 2017; Label: NH Media; Formats: CD, digital download	18	KOR: 1,854+
I'm a Fool (멍청이)	Released: February 8, 2023; Label: YES IM Entertainment; Formats: CD, digital download	29	KOR: 5,107

=== Singles ===
Title	Single details
Brave Brothers 10th Anniversary Project, Part 01 (용감한형제 10주년 앨범 Part.1) Track listing: Even After I Got Hurt (그렇게 당해놓고) (ft. Maboos of Electricboyz); Even After I Got Hurt Inst. (그렇게 당해놓고 Inst.) (ft. Maboos of Electricboyz)	Released: December 30, 2013; Format: CD, digital download
A Guy Like Me (나란놈이란)	Released: September 24, 2013; Format: CD, digital download
Open the Door (문을 여시오)	Released: October 30, 2013; Format: CD, digital download
We Were...(with Xia)	Released: December 15, 2017; Format: CD, digital download

=== Album appearances ===
Title	Year	Album
Gone with the Wind (바람과 함께 사라지다)	2013	Hot Summer Cool Music

=== Soundtrack appearances ===
Title	Year	Album
슬픈연가 (환규의 테마)	1997	Beat OST
언제나 같은 생각	2012	Ji Woon-soo's Stroke of Luck OST
Way Back Home (집으로 가는 길)	2012	Ji Woon-soo's Stroke of Luck OST
Goodbye	2014	Three Days OST
Wait (기다리라 해요)	2014	Gunman in Joseon OST
It will be Alright (괜찮아질텐데)	2015	Sweet, Savage Family OST
You Tell Me (그대 내게 말하길)	2017	Man to Man OST
Repeatedly (되풀이)	2021	Penthouse 2 OST
This Is What I Am (이게 바로 나야)	2021	Penthouse 2 OST

== Filmography ==
=== Film ===
Year	Title	Role
1990	North Korean Partisan in South Korea	Jeon Sae-young
1990	Rose Motel	
1992	From Seom River to the Sky	Goo Dae-hoon
1992	Walking All the Way to Heaven	
1994	The Rules of the Game	Client 1
1997	Beat	Hwan-gyu
1998	Extra	Park Bong-soo
1998	If the Sun Rises in the West	Kim Beom-soo
2000	The Happy Funeral Director	Jae-hyun
2000	Jakarta	Blue
2001	My Boss, My Hero	Hyeok-sam (cameo)
2002	Bet on My Disco	Bong-pal
2002	Sex Is Zero	Jang Eun-shik
2003	Reversal of Fortune	Police officer (cameo)
2003	The Greatest Expectation	Chang-shik
2003	Romantic Assassin	Ghost in armor (cameo)
2004	To Catch a Virgin Ghost	Yang-yi
2005	Cracked Eggs and Noodles	Dae-gyu
2005	All for Love	Kim Chang-hoo
2006	Aachi & Ssipak	Ssipak (voice)
2007	Miracle on 1st Street	Pil-je
2007	Underground Rendezvous	Young-tae
2007	Scout	Ho-chang
2007	Sex Is Zero 2	Eun-shik
2009	Fortune Salon	Seung-won
2010	Twilight Gangsters	Bang Joon-seok
2010	Romantic Debtors	Detective Bang Geuk-hyun
2011	Shotgun Love	Sang-yeol
2012	Rain and Rain	Soo-hyun
2012	The Traffickers	Young-gyu
2013	Tumbleweed	Chang-soo
2014	The Con Artists	Chef (cameo)
2015	Untouchable Lawmen	Lee Jung-jin
2017	Roman Holiday	In-han
2018	Gate	Gyu-cheol

=== Television series ===
Year	Title	Role
1991	Eyes of Dawn	Gil-soo
1992	Days of Sunshine	
1994	Ladybug	
1996	Three Guys and Three Girls	
1997	New York Story	
2010	The Woman Who Still Wants to Marry	Jerry Oh (cameo)
2012	Ji Woon-soo's Stroke of Luck	Ji Woon-soo
2017	Witch at Court	Investigated man (special appearance)
2019	The Light in Your Eyes	a swindler (cameo, Ep. 5)

=== Television show ===
Year	Title	Role
2009	Invincible Baseball Team	Infielder, pitcher
2009	Superstar K	Season 1 host
2014–15	Law of the Jungle in Costa Rica	Cast member
2021	Star Golf Big League	Cast Member
2022	Same Bed, Different Dreams 2: You Are My Destiny	Cast
2022	Golf Battle: Birdie Buddies 4	Contestant

=== Web shows ===
Year	Title	Role	Notes	Ref.
2022	SNL Korea	Host	Season 2 – episode 17	

== Musical theatre ==
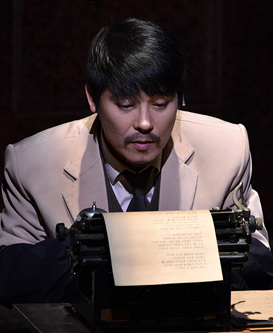
Im in Le Passe-Muraille in 2012

Year	Title	Role	Ref.
2009	Bbalae (Laundry)	Solongo	
2010–2011	Radio Star	Park Min-soo	
2012	Le Passe-Muraille	Dusoleil	
2022	Mrs. Doubt Fire	Daniel / Doutfire	

== Awards and nominations ==
=== As a singer ===
Year	Award	Category	Nominated work	Result	Ref.
1997	Golden Disc Awards	Bonsang (Main Award)	"Again"	Won	
1997	Seoul Music Awards	Bonsang (Main Award)		Won	
1997	KBS Music Festival	Daesang (Grand Prize)	"Again"	Won	
1999	Seoul Music Awards	Bonsang (Main Award)		Won	
2000	Seoul Music Awards	Bonsang (Main Award)		Won	
2000	Mnet Music Video Festival	Best Ballad Performance	"My Love"	Nominated	
2001	Golden Disc Awards	Bonsang (Main Award)	"Reason to Wait"	Won	
2001	KBS Music Festival	Top 10 Singers		Won	
2001	Seoul Music Awards	Bonsang (Main Award)		Won	
2002	Mnet Music Video Festival	Best Ballad Performance	"Sad Monologue"	Nominated	
2014	Mnet Asian Music Awards	Best Male Artist		Nominated	
2015	Mnet Asian Music Awards	Best Vocal Performance	"Love Again"	Nominated	
2015	Seoul Music Awards	Performance Award		Won	
2016	Melon Music Awards	Best Ballad Award	"The Love I Committed"	Won	
2017	Golden Disc Awards	Digital Bonsang (Main Award)	"The Love I Committed"	Won	
2018	Golden Disc Awards	Ballad of the Year Award	Himself	Won	

=== As an actor ===
Year	Award	Category	Nominated work	Result	Ref.
1997	Grand Bell Awards	Best Supporting Actor	Beat	Won	
1997	Blue Dragon Film Awards	Best Supporting Actor	Beat	Nominated	
1998	Baeksang Arts Awards	Best New Actor (Film)	Beat	Won	
2002	Blue Dragon Film Awards	Best Supporting Actor	Bet on My Disco	Nominated	
2003	Grand Bell Awards	Best Supporting Actor	Bet on My Disco	Nominated	
2003	Baeksang Arts Awards	Most Popular Actor (Film)	Sex Is Zero	Won	
2008	Baeksang Arts Awards	Best Actor (Film)	Scout	Won	
2008	Grand Bell Awards	Best Actor	Scout	Nominated	
2012	Korean Culture and Entertainment Awards	Best Actor (Film)	The Traffickers	Won	
2022	2022 SBS Entertainment Awards	Social Star Award – Talk and Reality Category	Same Bed, Different Dreams 2: You Are My Destiny	Won	
