= Life Risking Romance =

- Theatrical release poster
- Hangul: 목숨 건 연애
- RR: Moksum geon yeonae
- MR: Moksum kŏn yŏnae
- Directed by: Song Min-kyu
- Written by: Kim Ba-da; Song Min-kyu
- Produced by: Jang Won-suk
- Starring: Ha Ji-won; Chun Jung-myung; Chen Bolin
- Cinematography: Lee Hyung-bin
- Edited by: Kim Woo-hyun
- Production companies: BA Entertainment; Novus Mediacorp
- Distributed by: Opus Pictures
- Release date: December 14, 2016
- Running time: 103 minutes
- Countries: South Korea; China
- Languages: Korean; English
- Box office: US$324,340

Life Risking Romance (Korean: 목숨 건 연애; RR: Moksum geon yeonae) is a 2016 South Korean-Chinese film directed by Song Min-kyu. It stars Ha Ji-won, Chun Jung-myung and Chen Bolin.

== Plot ==
Je-in is a mystery novel writer who chases after a serial killer with her longtime detective friend Rok-hwan. However, a love triangle kicks into gear when they come across Jason, an attractive and mysterious man with sharp probing skills.

== Cast ==
- Ha Ji-won as Han Je-in
  - Lee Da-in as Han Je-in (teens)
  - Lee Chae-mi as Han Je-in (young)
- Chun Jung-myung as Seol Rok-hwan
  - Jo Byeong-kyu as Seol Rok-hwan (teens)
  - Choi Ro-woon as Seol Rok-hwan (young)
- Chen Bolin as Jason Chen
- Oh Jung-se as Heo Jong-goo
- Yoon So-hee as Jung Yoo-mi
- Song Chae-yoon as Author Byun
- Kim Won-hae as Senior Patrol Officer Park
- Jung Hae-kyun as CEO Ji
- Yoon Kyung-ho as Police Chief / Noh Duk-Sool
- Kim Hee-chan as Ui-kyung
- Haha as (cameo)

== Production ==
Filming commenced on September 6, 2015, in Itaewon, and ended on December 5, 2015, in Paju.
