= Lee Dae-ro Can't Die =

- Poster to Lee Dae-ro Can't Die (2005)
- Hangul: 이대로, 죽을 순 없다
- RR: I Daero, jugeul sun eopda
- MR: I Taero, chugŭl sun ŏpta
- Directed by: Lee Young-eun
- Written by: Hwang Jo-yun
- Produced by: Kim Dong-ju; Kim Young-wun
- Starring: Lee Beom-soo; Byeon Ju-yeon; Choi Sung-kook
- Cinematography: Hong Jong-gyeong
- Edited by: Kim Sun-min
- Music by: Han Jae-kwon
- Distributed by: ShowEast
- Release date: August 18, 2005
- Running time: 108 minutes
- Country: South Korea
- Language: Korean
- Box office: US$4,736,013

Lee Dae-ro Can't Die (Korean: 이대로, 죽을 순 없다), also known as Short Time, is a 2005 South Korean action film about a corrupt police officer who is told he has only three months to live, and plots his own death so his wife can collect his insurance policy. The film was released to South Korean cinemas on August 18 and received a total of 838,419 admissions nationwide.

The film is similar to that of the 1990 American dark comedy film, Short Time.

== Plot ==
An officer in the violent crimes division, Dae-ro is a hero in his daughter Hyun-ji's eyes, but in fact he's a corrupt cop, interested only in bribe money and pretty women. He is totally selfish and takes great pains to keep himself out of harm's way, avoiding the danger inherent in his job. One day, while in pursuit of a suspect, Dae-ro faints and is taken to the hospital. There he is told that he has a brain tumor and has about three months to live at most. To provide for his daughter's financial security, Dae-ro plots his own death that will appear accidental so that she will collect a sizable insurance premium.

== Cast ==
- Lee Beom-soo
- Byeon Ju-yeon
- Choi Sung-kook
- Son Hyun-joo as Tak Mun-bae
