= Something Happened in Bali =

2004 South Korean television series

- Promotional poster
- Also known as: What Happened in Bali; Memories of Bali; Hearts in Bali
- Genre: Romance; Melodrama
- Written by: Kim Ki-ho
- Directed by: Choi Moon-suk
- Starring: Ha Ji-won; Zo In-sung; So Ji-sub; Park Ye-jin
- Music by: Cho Yoon-jung
- Country of origin: South Korea
- Original language: Korean
- No. of episodes: 20

Production
- Executive producers: Moon Jung-soo; Lee Sun-mi
- Producer: Kim Yang
- Production locations: Seoul, South Korea; Bali, Indonesia; Jakarta, Indonesia
- Running time: 60 minutes
- Production company: Victory Contents (formerly Victory Production Co.)

Original release
- Network: SBS TV
- Release: 3 January – 7 March 2004

Something Happened in Bali (Korean: 발리에서 생긴 일; RR: Ballieseo saenggin il) is a 2004 South Korean television series, starring Ha Ji-won, Zo In-sung, So Ji-sub and Park Ye-jin. It aired on SBS on Saturdays and Sundays at 21:55 for 20 episodes from January 3 to March 7, 2004.

== Plot ==
Lee Soo-jung (Ha Ji-won) is an orphan who works as a tour guide in Bali. She has a useless brother that constantly gets into trouble and needs her to bail him out all the time. She struggles to make ends meet and aspires to be rescued out of her current predicament by a rich and wealthy man.

Jung Jae-min (Zo In-sung) is the youngest son of the wealthy chairman of the Pax Group. He is uninterested in business, irresponsible, arrogant, childish, self-centered, and a playboy. Jae-min is constantly put down by his elder brother and beaten up by his father, but he is immune to all these treatments. He is engaged to Choi Young-joo (Park Ye-jin), who comes from a comparably wealthy and powerful family, but Jae-min and Young-joo are not in love with each other. Jae-min is of the opinion that even with marriage, it should not affect how both of them are to lead their lives.

Young-joo in turn is still in love with her ex-boyfriend Kang In-wook (So Ji-sub) whom she left so that she could be engaged to Jae-min (as pre-arranged by both parents). Kang In-wook comes from a lower-class family. His parents are divorced, and his mother opens a small restaurant. He is a capable person at work, but he has a cold exterior and it is difficult to read his mind.

Young-joo visits In-wook who is working in Indonesia, and asks him to spend some time with her where no one knows them. They take off to Bali only to be greeted by Jae-min at the airport who has tracked Young-joo down from Seoul. Young-joo claims that In-wook is an ex-classmate whom she met there. Jae-min invites In-wook to join him and Young-joo on the Bali trip. Soo-jung is the tour guide hired by Jae-min for the city tour. The tour was tense for Jae-min, In-wook, and Young-joo. Soo-jung tries to figure out how the three are connected and suspects In-wook to be the rich and wealthy one amongst them.

Jae-min finds out that In-wook is working for his family's factory in Indonesia, and his relationship with Young-joo. At the end of the tour, Jae-min gets drunk and unruly, and starts to throw insults at Young-joo and In-wook. A disgusted Young-joo leaves the drunk Jae-min behind and heads home for Seoul. Soo-jung takes Jae-min back to his room and realizes that Jae-min is the rich one amongst the three. In his half-drunken state, Jae-min asks Soo-jung to spend the night with him. Although Soo-jung calls Jae-min a bastard, she agrees to stay and tells him to pay whatever he deems fit. However, Jae-min throws money at Soo-jung and tells her to leave.

In-wook returns to his room in Bali half-drunk as well. He is hurt by the day's events. He hears someone crying in the next room and sees Soo-jung sobbing over the humiliating incident she has just encountered with Jae-min. She is also lamenting about her unfortunate and unlucky life. He overhears her phone conversation with her brother and learns a little about Soo-jung's pathetic situation.

In-wook returns to Jakarta and is told that he is to be transferred back to the head office in Seoul. Soo-jung also sets forth to return to Seoul to track down her colleague, Jo, who has run away with her money. They meet on the plane on the way back. Jae-min's scheming brother places In-wook under Jae-min. Jae-min's brother lures In-wook to his camp to devise a financing plan to pump money from his father for an external investment.

Soo-jung puts up at her friend Mi-hee's place. She decides to try her luck with Jae-min for a job. However, he has forgotten about her and chases her out of her office. Soo-jung's brother gets into trouble and sells Soo-jung to his debtors. Soo-jung ends up working in a nightclub as a human signboard touting business for the nightclub.

In-wook moves into the apartment next to Mi-hee's. Soo-jung and In-wook reunite outside the nightclub when Mi-hee invites In-wook to the club. Somehow, Jae-min also tracks In-wook to the same nightclub that fateful night, and their meeting turns into an ugly brawl with the club's gangsters. Soo-jung knocks out the leader of the gang while trying to save the two guys. They run away and manage to escape the gangsters. Jae-min buys Soo-jung an expensive coat to thank her for her help, and leaves. But because Soo-jung offended the gangsters during the fight, she is taken back to the nightclub and forced to be a bar hostess.

Jae-min checks up on Soo-jung's background and learns that she has been relegated to a bar hostess. He brings his friends to the nightclub and asks for Soo-jung. He wants to take her out for the night, but Soo-jung refuses and tells him to take the other girls instead. Jae-min leaves her his name card and tells her to call him if she changes her mind.

After her second humiliating meeting with Jae-min, Soo-jung meets In-wook on the way home. She takes him out for a drink. And over the conversation, she sobs to In-wook about her situation and tells him of her aspiration to marry a rich man to end her misery.

Unable to bear with working as a bar hostess, Soo-jung eventually looks Jae-min up and borrows ₩30 million to pay off her brother's debts. She offers to sleep with Jae-min as a last resort, but Jae-min tells her that he is not interested in her. He lends her the money anyway, and Soo-jung promises to find a job and pay him back. Jae-min tells Soo-jung to look him up if she fails to find anything. Soo-jung pays off her debts and parts ways with her brother. She tells her brother not to look her up unless he finds Jo and gets her money back. She resists asking for a job from Jae-min and vows to find a job on her own. However, Soo-jung is unsuccessful in her job search and ends up working in a karaoke bar.

Jae-min gets restless when he does not hear from Soo-jung after giving her the money, and he decides to look her up at Mi-hee's apartment. He finds Soo-jung in In-wook's apartment where they are sharing a drink and chatting. Jae-min chides Soo-jung as irresponsible and asks why she did not call to let him know that she's got the money. He tells her to report to work the next day at his office.

Meanwhile, Young-joo continues to stalk In-wook at his apartment seeking reconciliation. She tries to call off the engagement, to which Jae-min happily agrees. Young-joo is puzzled at Jae-min's willingness to call it off and starts to feel unwanted. However, In-wook is not willing to take Young-joo back as he feels that she does not love him but rather wants to possess him out of her own selfish reasons. In-wook also starts to work with Jae-min's brother closely on the investment plan. Jae-min's brother in turn introduces In-wook to participate at the senior board meetings.

Jae-min and Young-joo's engagement is not called off because Jae-min's mother blackmails Young-joo with intimate photographs taken of Young-joo and In-wook. Young-joo is resigned to her predicament and plays along with the arrangement of both parents on the engagement.

Soo-jung starts work at Jae-min's company as a receptionist but falls asleep in the office on her first day of work. She leaves the office late and runs into Jae-min who was hiding in the nearby meeting room from his tyrant father (a.k.a. the chairman). Jae-min takes Soo-jung for a fancy dinner to celebrate her first day at work, but Jae-min's good mood was ruined when Soo-jung mentions In-wook during dinner. She feels that it is through divine intervention and fate that she keeps meeting In-wook e.g. he was her neighbour in the hotel in Bali, they sat next to each other on the plane to Seoul, and now he is her neighbour and colleague. Jae-min is unhappy to hear about Soo-jung, and In-wook's encounters and promptly leaves the restaurant. He tells Soo-jung to go home on her own and she is puzzled by Jae-min's response.

In-wook also starts to ask Soo-jung out. He brings her home to see his mother, and they even spent a happy afternoon at the cinema. Jae-min works late in the office and is locked in the building. Coincidentally, Soo-jung is also stuck in the building. She falls asleep in his office, and when she leaves in the morning, Jae-min asks her whether meeting him is also a kind of destiny for Soo-jung as well. In-wook sees Soo-jung leaving Jae-min's office.

In-wook returns home to see Young-joo waiting for him. She asks In-wook to be her lover. In-wook takes Young-joo into his apartment and starts to take off his clothes. Young-joo asks In-wook what he is doing, and he retorts: "Isn't this what you want?" He leaves the apartment in a fury. Young-joo leaves as well. In-wook's mother visits In-wook and finds the apartment empty. She leaves food with Soo-jung and Mi-hee for In-wook. Soo-jung could not sleep and decides to take the food over to In-wook's apartment. In-wook returns to his apartment and finds Soo-jung there. He confesses to Soo-jung that he likes her and gives her a kiss. Soo-jung lies on In-wook's bed, and he bends over to kiss her. But all is interrupted when they hear Jae-min knocking at Mi-hee's door asking for Soo-jung.

Soo-jung jumps at hearing Jae-min's voice. As they stay silent in the dark apartment waiting for Jae-min to leave, both feel awkward at what has happened. The next morning, In-wook apologizes to Soo-jung for his actions and suggested that perhaps he had too much to drink.

Young-joo finds out about Jae-min's affiliation with Soo-jung. She goes to Jae-min's office to warn Soo-jung to stay away from Jae-min and tells Soo-jung that she is out of his league. But Jae-min has already asked Soo-jung to go to his apartment so as to tell her the whereabouts of Jo. Unfortunately, Jae-min's mother and Young-joo are at Jae-min's apartment and see Soo-jung there. Jae-min's mother is furious and slaps Soo-jung and calls her a cheap trash. Jae-min pushes his mother down in the tussle and runs off with Soo-jung.

Because of this incident, Soo-jung is fired from her job and is once more jobless. To make ends meet, she goes back to the karaoke again with Mi-hee. Young-joo finds Soo-jung and offers her a job at Jae-min's mother's gallery. Soo-jung decides to take up the offer. Jae-min is upset with what Young-joo has done to humiliate the woman he loves. He tells Soo-jung to quit the job and tells Young-joo that he is determined not to marry her. Young-joo in turn tells Jae-min that she is beginning to like him and will not call off the engagement. She dares Jae-min to call it off if he has the guts to go against his parents. Young-joo decides to stay over at Jae-min's apartment, but Jae-min leaves the apartment in disgust. He gets drunk and calls Mi-hee's mobile for Soo-jung in his drunken state.

In-wook and Soo-jung finds a drunk Jae-min outside the apartment. In-wook takes Jae-min in for the night. Jae-min wakes up and looks for Soo-jung at Mi-hee's apartment. He takes Soo-jung out and buys her a mobile phone. Jae-min calls Soo-jung on the mobile and asks to meet her.

Young-joo is caught drinking by herself at a hotel bar by Jae-min's friends. She calls In-wook over. As Young-joo is too drunk, In-wook checks her into the hotel. They met Jae-min at the lobby (he was tipped off by his friends), and Soo-jung walks into the lobby (she was tipped off by Jae-min). In-wook takes Young-joo up to the room, and Jae-min also leads Soo-jung to another room. He wants her to spend the night with him, and told Soo-jung that it is an opportunity for Soo-jung to try to replace Young-joo. She takes up the offer, and as she undresses Jae-min asks Soo-jung whether she can at least pretend to like him, and whether she agrees to spend the night with him to spite In-wook. Soo-jung asks Jae-min why he let her see In-wook with Young-joo and if it is for revenge as well. She leaves the room and at the corridors bumps into In-wook.

Young-joo went to Jae-min's apartment. She asks Jae-min whether he is jealous with what he saw and asks him not to make use of Soo-jung. Jae-min tells Young-joo that he likes Soo-jung the same way she likes In-wook. Young-joo is shaken with Jae-min's confession.

In-wook asks Soo-jung to leave Young-joo's employment, and Soo-jung asks In-wook whether he is ashamed about her job. She tells In-wook that she is used to such treatment and that it is alright to be working in such a cushy environment even though it is under such humiliating circumstance.

In-wook is promoted and he calls Soo-jung to have dinner with him. Soo-jung agrees but her conversation is overheard by Young-joo. Young-joo throws Soo-jung's phone in the water. Jae-min looks for Soo-jung in the gallery but was caught by his mother. As he tries to pacify his mother, Jae-min admits that he finds himself going insane when he does not get see Soo-jung even for a day. Soo-jung is shocked by Jae-min's admission of his affections for her. Jae-min sends Soo-jung home and asks her to stay by his side.

In-wook calls Jae-min and asks him whether he is with Soo-jung. Jae-min passes the phone to Soo-jung and In-wook is upset that she stood him up for dinner.

Jae-min takes Soo-jung to an apartment and tells her that she can stay there while she makes up her mind about his proposition. Soo-jung decides to accept Jae-min's offer and moves out of Mi-hee's apartment. She asks Jae-min what his conditions are. Jae-min agrees to give her anything she wants but marriage.

However, their cohabiting relationship was cut short when Young-joo's mother finds out about Soo-jung. She bashes Soo-jung at the gallery. Soo-jung leaves the apartment after a row with Jae-min and returns to Mi-hee's apartment. Soo-jung falls ill and In-wook takes care of her. Jae-min turns up to apologise but ends up in a fight with In-wook. Jae-min warns In-wook to stay away from Soo-jung as she is his woman.

Soo-jung quits her job at the gallery and is insulted by Young-joo. Soo-jung returns to the apartment and dresses up. She asks Jae-min out for a romantic dinner. After their wine and dine, both are a little tipsy and return to the apartment that Jae-min has arranged for Soo-jung. Soo-jung decides to leave and Jae-min begs her to stay. Soo-jung sobs and apologizes to Jae-min about her greed. Jae-min kisses her and they end up in bed. A heartbroken In-wook moves.

Jae-min's father finds out about Soo-jung and beats Jae-min to a pulp, threatening to harm Soo-jung as well if he does not go ahead with the wedding plans with Young-joo. Petrified by his father's warnings, Jae-min stays away from Soo-jung. Soo-jung finds out about Jae-min's wedding on the paper. She calls him to ask him out, but Jae-min (while breaking down on the other side of the phone) refuses, remembering his father's threats.

In-wook is double-crossed by Jae-min's brother, as he is being taken away from the investment project altogether. But he has already built his alliance with the investors, and they refuse to continue the deal with any other project team leader, other than In-wook.

Both Jae-min and Young-joo are miserable after their wedding as Jae-min cannot stop thinking about Soo-jung, and Young-joo realizes that she has married a walking corpse. Jae-min turns cold on her every time he sees her, and he is constantly drunk to drown his thoughts of Soo-jung. Jae-min learns from Soo-jung's brother that Soo-jung is seeing In-wook again, and that thought kills him through and through.

Jae-min finally announces his determination to have a divorce and abandon everything for Soo-jung. He asks Soo-jung to wait for him. Jae-min's father sends some men to take Soo-jung to him but they were intercepted by In-wook. Soo-jung takes refuge at In-wook's apartment. In-wook asks Soo-jung to leave Korea with him. Soo-jung accepts In-wook's offer, and they leave for Bali to start a new life.

Jae-min's brother finds out that In-wook has embezzled all the funds from the investment project, passes out and is hospitalized. Jae-min finds out that In-wook has eloped with Soo-jung and tracks them down to Bali.

Jae-Min sees them in bed in Bali living luxuriously after stealing $30 million from the company. He proceeds to shoot them both in a fit of rage and sadness. Soo-Jung tells Jae-Min she loves him with her last breath. Jae-Min, overwhelmed by sadness, walks to the beach and commits suicide with the same gun he used on In-Wook and Soo-Jung.

== Cast ==
=== Main ===
- Ha Ji-won as Lee Soo-jung
- Zo In-sung as Jung Jae-min
- So Ji-sub as Kang In-wook
- Park Ye-jin as Choi Young-joo

=== Supporting ===
- Kim Il-woo as Jae-min's older brother
- Kim Soo-mi as Jae-min's mother
- Kim Ha-kyun as Jo Sang-bae
- Shin Yi as Park Mi-hee
- Kim Hyung-bum as Lee Jang-soo
- Kim Seung-wook as Jae-min's subordinate
- Kim In-tae as Jae-min's father
- Kim Hye-ok as Young-joo's mother

== Soundtrack ==
What Happened in Bali Original Sound Track

Soundtrack album by Various Artists
- Released: February 4, 2004
- Genre: Soundtracks
- Label: Yedang Entertainment

The original soundtrack of the series was released on February 4, 2004

=== Track listing ===
(Original Sound Track)
No.	Title	Artist	Length
1.	"Dialogue"	Ha Ji Won	0:41
3.	"Remember"	Oh Hyun Ran	3:40
4.	"An Doi Gess Ni (안되겠니)"	Jo Eun	4:20
6.	"My Love"	Lee Hyun Sub	4:31
13.	"The Way (Guitar)"	Various	2:28
15.	"Title II. Love In Bali"	Various	1:02

== Ratings ==
Date	Episode	Seoul Area	Nationwide
2004-01-03	1	17.7% (6th)	15.1% (7th)
2004-01-04	2	19.7% (4th)	18.8% (5th)
2004-01-10	3	23.1% (3rd)	19.8% (5th)
2004-01-11	4	25.0% (2nd)	24.6% (3rd)
2004-01-17	5	25.4% (2nd)	26.1% (2nd)
2004-01-18	6	26.1% (2nd)	27.7% (1st)
2004-01-24	7	26.9% (1st)	31.1% (2nd)
2004-01-25	8	25.6% (2nd)	27.6% (3rd)
2004-01-31	9	29.9% (1st)	28.3% (1st)
2004-02-01	10	25.3% (2nd)	23.8% (2nd)
2004-02-07	11	23.7% (5th)	21.4% (4th)
2004-02-08	12	25.6% (3rd)	27.1% (2nd)
2004-02-14	13	25.5% (3rd)	22.4% (4th)
2004-02-15	14	24.1% (3rd)	25.6% (3rd)
2004-02-21	15	29.4% (2nd)	30.3% (2nd)
2004-02-22	16	25.7% (2nd)	29.9% (2nd)
2004-02-28	17	25.8% (2nd)	31.4% (2nd)
2004-02-29	18	25.7% (3rd)	35.6% (1st)
2004-03-06	19	31.3% (1st)	21.9% (4th)
2004-03-07	20	31.8% (1st)	39.7%(1st)
Average		25.6%	26.4%

Source: TNS Media Korea

== Awards and nominations ==
Year	Award	Category	Recipient	Result
2004	40th Baeksang Arts Awards	Best Actor (TV)	Zo In-sung	Won
2004	40th Baeksang Arts Awards	Best Actress (TV)	Ha Ji-won	Won
2004	40th Baeksang Arts Awards	Best Screenplay (TV)	Kim Ki-ho	Won
2004	40th Baeksang Arts Awards	Most Popular Actor (TV)	So Ji-sub	Won
2004	6th Mnet Asian Music Awards	Best OST	"Can't It Be" – Cho Eun	Nominated
2004	SBS Drama Awards	Top Excellence Award, Actor	Zo In-sung	Won
2004	SBS Drama Awards	Top Excellence Award, Actor	So Ji-sub	Nominated
2004	SBS Drama Awards	Top Excellence Award, Actress	Ha Ji-won	Won
2004	SBS Drama Awards	Top 10 Stars	Zo In-sung	Won
2004	SBS Drama Awards	Top 10 Stars	Ha Ji-won	Won
