= My Boss, My Hero =

2001 film by Yoon Je-kyoon

- Poster for My Boss, My Hero (2001)
- Hangul: 두사부일체
- Hanja: 頭師父一體
- RR: Dusabuilche
- MR: Tusabuilch'e
- Directed by: Yoon Je-kyoon
- Written by: Yoon Je-kyoon
- Produced by: Kim Du-chan; Lee Hyo-seung; Jo Yun-ho
- Starring: Jung Joon-ho; Jung Woong-in
- Cinematography: Hwang Chul-hyun
- Edited by: Kim Sun-min; Nam Na-yeong
- Music by: Angelo Lee
- Distributed by: CJ Entertainment (South Korea); StudioCanal Home Entertainment (International)
- Release date: December 8, 2001
- Running time: 98 minutes
- Country: South Korea
- Languages: Korean; French

My Boss, My Hero (Korean: 두사부일체) is a 2001 South Korean action comedy film. It is the first of a trilogy with My Boss, My Teacher in 2006 and The Mafia, The Salesman in 2007.

== Synopsis ==
This gangster comedy tells of Du-shik, a successful young mobster who is rising up the ranks in a gang. He is due for a promotion to take over the Myeongdong district of Seoul, but many of the gang's upper brass feel he is not well-educated enough to take on such an important territory as many of the underlings have graduated high-school and even college. Du-shik is promised the territory as long as he achieves a high-school diploma and is enrolled in a private school as a 19-year-old. His right-hand man Sang-du, a college graduate, and Ga-ri, a goofball meathead, are his primary support throughout Du-shik's high-school experience and aid him in keeping his true identity hidden.

On his first day of school, Du-shik encounters Yun-ju while they are running to school to avoid getting punished for tardiness; a small purse falls out of her bookbag as she runs, which Du-shik retrieves causing him to be late. Sang-du and Ga-ri look on as Du-shik and other students who arrive late are punished by Mr. Jo, a strict yet highly respected math teacher. The English teacher Ms. Lee walks by the students and catches the eye of Sang-du, who is immediately infatuated by her. Later on in that day, Yun-ju and two of her friends get into a brawl with three rival classmates led by Ji-hye; all six get sent to the dean, but Ji-hye and her friends are immediately dismissed without punishment. Du-shik ends up in the same class as Yun-ju and is assigned a seat next to her, and soon the two become friends. Du-shik also has frequent run-ins with the class clown/bully; he withstands getting beat and mugged in order to keep his identity a secret. There is also a local crazy man with wild hair, a trench coat, and a camcorder. He is constantly recording his surroundings and is regularly seen around the school grounds.

School continues through the semester. In a private meeting, the dean is urging Mr. Jo to unfairly change grades of certain students - particularly that of Ji-hye, who has wealthy and influential parents and are essentially paying for the prestige of having high grades and earning a scholarship. Mr. Jo refuses and notes that this corruption would push deserving students below the scholarship threshold (and names Yun-ju specifically as a deserving student who would be lose out). Later on, the dean interrupts a class to embarrass and punish students who have not paid monthly dues to the school. It is apparent that the school collects hundreds of dollars from each of the students each month, and some, such as Yun-ju, are several payments behind. Mr. Jo walks in and forces the dean out.

During one of Ms. Lee's English classes, Ji-hye is caught passing notes in class. She is told to come to the front of the class to receive punishment, but instead mutters inappropriate insults to Ms. Lee under her breath; she has no fear of any punishments because of her status, but Ms. Lee slaps her for her insubordination and behavior. Ji-hye, while in the bathroom, immediately calls her mom and cries on the phone to her; not long after her mom appears in the classroom and assaults Ms. Lee. The dean defends the parents and verbally reprimands Ms. Lee while Mr. Jo stands up for her. Mr. Jo is later called into the principal's office, where he is insulted and threatened with termination if he doesn't change Ji-hye's grades. This tears into the conscience of Mr. Jo, a teacher who truly cares about his students - particularly those who aren't privileged. He returns to class very dejected and starts hitting one of the class clowns that had been misbehaving, but the bully disrespectfully talks back to Mr. Jo and pushes him down; this enrages Du-shik and severely beats up the bully inside the classroom for his insubordination to the teacher. Du-shik, who had generally been under the radar, is now feared and respected by his classmates. Later that evening, Du-shik treats the bully to some drinks as an apology of sorts; there, the bully is confronted by a rival bully from a neighboring school, but Du-shik defends him and ends up beating up his classmate's rival and his entire crew.

Things calm down and Mr. Jo has a private meeting with Yun-ju, urging her that she needs to study harder to get a scholarship. It's clear that he was forced to fudge Ji-hye's grades, which no longer make Yun-ju eligible for a scholarship, which puts even more pressure on her. At the same time, Ms. Lee is called into a private meeting with the principal, who sexually assaults her by in appropriately touching her hair, neck, and chest. She storms out immediately in tears and momentarily bumps into Du-shik in the hallway. That night, Yun-ju and Du-shik go out on a date and she jokingly asks him to marry her so he could pay for her college tuition. He knows it's a joke, but fully understands that she is poor and has no chances at attending college without a scholarship. They randomly run into Sang-du and Ms. Lee, who are out for a drink; the four of them enjoy a fun night of drinking and karaoke as a means to let off some steam and party their sorrows away. Du-shik is still completely oblivious to the corruption that is going on in the school, despite witnessing Ms. Lee crying, Mr. Jo acting strangely, and seeing the dean act as a bill-collector.

One random evening, Du-shik is with Sang-du and Ka-ri at a private bar in their gang headquarters and are about to enjoy a fun night with host girls (girls hired to accompany gangsters and party with them). To Du-shik's shock, one of the girls is Yun-ju. Now that Du-shik's true identity is revealed, the two of them have a private conversation and he asks her why she's doing this while imploring her to quit. While weeping, she says that took on this degrading job because she desperately needs the money for college and her youth and virginity will help her even more money. She mentions that Du-shik, who is financially well off, will never understand how bleak her future looks. She storms off weeping while Du-shik sits alone, clearly distraught. Immediately after, he tasks Sang-du to do a little digging into the school and the principal.

The next day at school, things are clearly awkward between Du-shik and Yun-ju. Before either can say a word to one another, another student runs into class in tears, informing everyone that Mr. Jo had resigned. All the students are in tears while Mr. Jo quietly gives his final lesson; despite his harsh and strict ways, the students know he has pure intentions and fights hard for them. Mr. Jo and Ms. Lee are packing their belongings in the teacher's quarters, with Ms. Lee breaking down in tears. Later, Yun-ju is seen sitting in the computer lab in front of one computer; this is noted by the dean, but he doesn't think much of it.

Sang-du reports his findings to Du-shik; it appears that the principal is somehow the owner of malls, golf courses, etc. in the territory of a rival gang, and it becomes clear that the principal is affiliated with them. On the following day, the school is hit with a scandal as an exposé of bribery, fixed grades, and inane monthly dues is posted on the school's website as well as the website of the Department of Education. The principal and dean are enraged about these reports and wonder who might've possibly leaked this information, and based on the wording it is probable that it was submitted by a student. The dean instantly remembers Yun-ju sitting in the computer lab. The principal shows up in Yun-ju's class, calls her out, and severely beats her to the point where she is bloodied and knocked unconscious and has to be taken to the hospital by Du-shik and her friends.

After this incident, the fired teachers as well as students who refuse to attend class form a protest. Du-shik remains in the class despite the pleading of his classmates to join them in protest because he doesn't want to jeopardize his chances at graduation. He discusses with Sang-du what his options are. Sang-du implores him to stay in school and graduate, but Du-shik knows that is the wrong thing to do. What makes things more complicated is that they're dealing with a school and not an establishment they're used to dealing with (bars, nightclubs, etc.). Du-shik visits Yun-ju at the hospital at night; she sobs on his shoulders and while it's clear that he feels for her, he is torn.

Du-shik attends school the next day and sees that the school has not only blocked off the fired teachers, but students as well. The principal arrives with gang members, who assault Mr. Jo, Ms. Lee, and even the students. Upon seeing this, Du-shik can no longer hold his breath, gives the green light to his own gang for an attack, and starts fighting. His cover is now completely blown, but his crew overtakes the rival gang and storm the entrance of the school. They scream for the principal to come out, but many more members of the rival gang appear. They have an all-out brawl in the schoolyard with baseball bats and other weapons, with on final man-to-man fight between Du-shik and the rival leader to decide the outcome. It ends up in a draw, with both sides completely bloodied and bruised, and police come to arrest them all. The entire time, the crazy man had been recording everything, and slips the videotape into the pocket of a news cameraman.

It is presumed that Du-shik, the teachers, and students had successfully exposed the corruption. Du-shik earned a diploma equivalency while in jail and is congratulated by his superior, who feels that maybe he needs even more education to run the territory. He asks Du-shik to start writing in English, and then tells him that he needs to go to college.

== Cast ==
- Jung Joon-ho... Gye Du-shik
- Jung Woong-in... Kim Sang-du
- Jung Woon-taek... Dae Ga-ri
- Oh Seung-eun... Lee Yoon-ju
- Song Seon-mi... Lee Ji-seon
- Park Jun-gyu... Jo Bong-pal
- Kang Sung-pil... Yang Dong-pal
- Gi Ju-bong... Sang Chun-man
- Yun Mun-sik... Sal-Sali
- Go Myung-hwan... Babary-man
- Lee Si-yeon

== Remake ==
A Japanese television drama remake titled My Boss My Hero aired on Nippon TV in the summer of 2006.
