= 100 Days with Mr. Arrogant =

- Film poster
- Hangul: 내 사랑 싸가지
- RR: Nae sarang ssagaji
- MR: Nae sarang ssagaji
- Directed by: Shin Jai-ho
- Written by: Shin Jai-ho
- Produced by: Jeong Ji-hun
- Starring: Ha Ji-won; Kim Jaewon
- Cinematography: Hwang Cheol-hyeon
- Edited by: Ko Im-pyo
- Music by: Jo Byeong-seok
- Distributed by: Cinema Service
- Release date: January 16, 2004
- Running time: 95 minutes
- Country: South Korea
- Language: Korean

100 Days with Mr. Arrogant (aka My Love Ssagaji) is a 2004 South Korean romantic comedy film directed by Shin Jai-ho, starring Ha Ji-won and Kim Jaewon in the lead roles.

== History ==
The film originates from a genre called internet fiction (derived from which were movies such as My Sassy Girl, Do Re Mi Fa So La Ti Do, A Millionaire's First Love, Romance of Their Own, and He Was Cool. This popular internet fiction was later released in the form of a four-part book series that was later turned into a movie. Although there are many scenes that were taken out and also added in place, it was a big hit around that time to create movies that derived from internet fiction stories and writers. The original Korean title can be translated as My Love, the Asshole, or, more roughly, as My Love, the No-manners.

== Plot ==
After being dumped by her boyfriend just before their 100-day anniversary, Ha-Yeong (Ha Ji-won) meets a college guy named Hyung-Jun (Kim Jaewon) when she kicks a can that accidentally hits him in the face and causes him to scratch his Lexus. He demands she pay him $3000 on the spot. She escapes from him, accidentally leaving her wallet behind.

Hyung-Jun stalks her, demanding money to pay for his car. Since she is a poor high school student Hyung-Jun writes up an "Enslavement Agreement" for Ha-Yeong to pay for the damage to his car. Ha-Yeong is thrown into a nightmarish slave life for 100 days, running his errands, i.e.: cleaning his house, carrying his shopping, and cleaning his car.

By accident, she finds out that the damage to Hyung-Jun's car costs only $10. She then takes her revenge by damaging his car and his reputation. But Hyung-Jun takes revenge by becoming her new tutor. This brings them close to each other and they realize they love each another. Hyung-Jun frees Ha-Yeong from "slavery" as the 100 days are over and later even kisses her standing in front of her house's main gate. Ha-Yeong's mother sees this and threatens Hyung-Jun to stay away from her daughter's life, then brings a new tutor to teach Ha-Yeong. Ha-Yeong tells Hyung-Jun that she wants to marry him but he says that he only toyed with her. Hyung-Jun leaves his apartment which makes Ha-Yeong more vulnerable. She studies hard so she can get into Hyung-Jun's college.

After the exams, when she finds out she was not selected to enter the same college as Hyung-Jun, her tutor takes her to a place where she finds Hyung-Jun telling her that she was selected into his college but he wants to give her a surprise. After a long time, we see Ha-Yeong driving while talking to Hyung-Jun about all the chores that he did not do. A high school kid is shown who kicks a can that accidentally hits her in the face and causes her to scratch her Lexus. She tells him that there is only one way to get out of paying for damages, hinting at working for them and do the chores she was just talking to Hyung-Jun about.

== Cast ==
- Kim Jaewon as Ahn Hyung-jun
- Ha Ji-won as Kang Ha-yeong
- Kim Tae-hyun as Yeong-eun
- Han Min as Hyeon-ju
- Kim Chang-wan as Ha-yeong's Father
- Hong Ji-Yeong
- Kim Ji-yu
- Kim Min-kyeong
- Lee Eung-kyung as Ha-yeong's Mother
- Kim Yong-gun as Hyung-jun's father
- Kim Ji-hoon as Homeless
