= Reversal of Fortune (2003 film) =

- Hangul: 역전에 산다
- Hanja: 逆轉에 산다
- RR: Yeokjeone sanda
- MR: Yŏkchŏne sanda
- Directed by: Park Yong-woon
- Written by: Oh Hyun-ri; Kim Moon-sung; Kwon So-yeon; Park Yong-woon
- Produced by: Lee Chang-sae
- Starring: Kim Seung-woo; Ha Ji-won
- Cinematography: Kim Dong-cheon
- Edited by: Ham Seong-weon
- Music by: Lee Seung-heui
- Distributed by: Cinema Service
- Release date: June 13, 2003
- Running time: 110 minutes
- Country: South Korea
- Language: Korean

Reversal of Fortune (Korean: 역전에 산다) is a 2003 South Korean sports romantic comedy film directed by Park Yong-woon, and starring Kim Seung-woo and Ha Ji-won. The film features several songs from Ha Ji-won's debut album, Homerun.

== Plot ==
Having ended a career as a professional golfer, Kang Seung-wan works at a stock exchange and is in debt to local gangster Ma Kang-sung. After crashing his car while driving through a tunnel, Seung-wan wakes up in an alternate reality where he pursued golf and became a golf champion. His wife wants a divorce, and he must compete in a major golf tournament despite not having played for over ten years.

== Cast ==
- Kim Seung-woo as Kang Seung-wan
- Ha Ji-won as Han Ji-yeong
- Kang Sung-jin as Dae-shik
- Lee Moon-sik as Ma Kang-sung
- Ko Ho-kyeong as Seon-joo
- Im Chang-jung as Police officer
- Park Kwang-jeong
- Im Yoo-jin
