= Sex Is Zero =

2002 South Korean film directed by Yoon Je-kyoon

- Theatrical poster
- Hangul: 색즉시공
- RR: Saekjeuksigong
- MR: Saekchŭksigong
- Directed by: Yoon Je-kyoon
- Written by: Yoon Je-kyoon
- Produced by: Yoon Je-kyoon; Lee Ji-seung
- Starring: Im Chang-jung; Ha Ji-won
- Cinematography: Kim Yong-cheol
- Edited by: Kim Sun-min
- Music by: Park Yeong-cheol
- Production companies: Doosaboo Film; FilmZ
- Distributed by: Showbox
- Release date: December 12, 2002
- Running time: 96 minutes
- Country: South Korea
- Language: Korean
- Budget: $2,202,000 US
- Box office: $23,856,048

Sex Is Zero (Korean: 색즉시공; RR: Saekjeuksigong) is a 2002 South Korean film written and directed by Yoon Je-kyoon, starring Im Chang-jung and Ha Ji-won. In the style of American gross-out comedies like American Pie, it follows the exploits of a group of college students, which eventually takes a serious turn. Sex Is Zero sold 4,089,900 tickets in South Korea, making it the fifth most popular film of 2002.

A sequel, Sex Is Zero 2, was released in December 2007, starring most of the original cast.

== Plot ==
The plot follows the story of college student Eun-shik and his efforts to impress a Junior, Eun-hyo. Eun-shik has a habit of finding himself in awkward situations that often embarrass him and sabotage his attempts to impress Eun-hyo. After serving a two-year mandatory military service, Eun-shik is transferred to the National University, where he plans to major in Law. He stays with 3 other roommates; most of them are typical college freshmen who are equally perverted. Eun-hyo, an aspiring national aerobic athlete, first notices Eun-shik, who is somewhat of an eccentric, in the college canteen while he stared at her tightly clasped thighs protruding from her lower mini-skirt. With a mischievous intentions, she spreads her legs tauntingly, and a glimpse of her white undergarments catches Eun-shik by surprise. Afterwards, their awkward encounters follow. Although Eun-hyo sympathizes with Eun-shik's one-sided love, she eventually picks the most handsome student in college, Sang-ok. While two-timing with another aerobic athlete, Sang-ok spends one night with Eun-hyo, which leads to an accidental pregnancy. Due to his wealthy and spoiled upbringing, he offers her money for an abortion emotionlessly. Insulted by his actions and his lack of responsibility, Eun-hyo runs away and tries to abort by herself. The doctor from clinic requires someone to accompany her during the procedure and recovery. At a loss of whom to confide in, she turns to Eun-shik for help, who is initially illusioned that they are going out on a date. Due to his kind demeanor, he helps her with everything after her procedure; he aids her during her post-operational fever, cooks her meals, and keeps her company. He even tries to entertain her after her recent breakup with Sang-ok. Finally, on the day of national aerobic competition, Eun-hyo manages to come onstage at the last minute and performs with all her might. After the competition, she gives in to the looming sadness from her abortion and breakup. She goes to the restroom, cries, and bleeds from her womb as an after effect from her abortion operation. Eun-shik notices her missing and sends her to the hospital after discovering her in the restroom. Out of frustration and deep-seated hatred of Sang-ok, he searches for Sang-ok. He finds Sang-ok enjoying himself after the competition. He tells Sang-ok about Eun-hyo's recent tragedy and punches him. At the end of the movie, Eun-hyo is discharged from the hospital and asks Eun-shik if his feelings still remain the same.

== Cast ==
- Im Chang-jung as Jang Eun-shik
- Ha Ji-won as Lee Eun-hyo
- Jung Min as Ham Sang-ok
- Jin Jae-young as Kim Ji-won
- Choi Sung-kook as Choi Seong-guk
- Yoo Chae-yeong as Han Yoo-mi
- Ham So-won as Kim Hyun-hee
- Jo Dal-hwan as Jo Dal-hwan
- Shin Yi as Park Kyung-joo
- Lee Si-yeon as Lee Dae-hak
- Yoon Shi-hoo as Jo Yeon-kyung
- Choi Won-young as Park Chan-soo
- Park Jun-gyu as Pervert #1
- Nam Chang-hee as Pervert #2
- Gi Ju-bong as OB/GYN doctor
- Jung Kyung-ho as Seong-guk's right-hand man
- Sunwoo Eun-sook as Eun-hyo's mother
- Kim Young-im as host bar lady
- Park Byung-eun as Sang-ok's friend
- Kang Sung-pil
- Kang Jae-seop as waiter
