= List of South Korean films of 2007 =

This is a complete list of South Korean films that received a domestic theatrical release in 2007.

Source for release dates and box-office admission results (except where cited otherwise): Koreanfilm.org.

== Box office ==
The highest-grossing South Korean films released in 2007, by domestic box office gross revenue, are as follows:

Highest-grossing films released in 2007
Rank	Title	Distributor	Domestic gross
1	D-War	Showbox	$40,097,590
2	May 18	CJ Entertainment	$35,838,135
3	Le Grand Chef	CJ Entertainment	$15,428,321
4	Voice of a Murderer	CJ Entertainment	$14,302,005
5	Miracle on 1st Street	CJ Entertainment	$12,591,729
6	Going by the Book	CJ Entertainment	$11,332,735
7	Seven Days	Prime Entertainment	$11,150,245
8	Sex Is Zero 2	CJ Entertainment	$10,943,906
9	A Love	Lotte Cultureworks	$10,927,377
10	Paradise Murdered	MK Pictures	$10,247,351

== Released ==
English/Korean Title	Director	Cast	Released	Admissions	Notes
Attack on the Pin-Up Boys 꽃미남 연쇄 테러 사건	Lee Kwon	Super Junior	26 July	110,905	The first film to be produced by SM Pictures.
The Bank Attack 마을금고연쇄습격사건	Park Sang-joon	Baek Yoon-sik; Lee Moon-sik	14 November	123,770	
A Battle of Wits 묵공	Jacob Chang	Andy Lau; Ahn Sung-ki	10 January	191,308	A joint-production between China, Hong Kong, Japan and South Korea.
Beautiful Sunday 뷰티풀 선데이	Jin Kwang-gyo	Park Yong-woo; Namkoong Min	29 March	180,178	
Before the Summer Passes Away 여름이 가기 전에	Sung Ji-hae	Kim Bo-kyung; Lee Hyun-woo	25 January	4,552	
Beyond the Years 천년학	Im Kwon-taek	Jo Jae-hyun; Oh Jung-hae	12 April	145,271	
Big Bang 쏜다	Park Jung-woo	Kam Woo-sung; Kim Soo-ro	14 March	365,684	
Black House 검은집	Shin Tae-ra	Hwang Jung-min; Kang Shin-il	21 June	1,408,882	
Boys of Tomorrow 우리에게 내일은 없다	Noh Dong-seok	Yoo Ah-in; Kim Byeong-seok	17 May	3,500	
Bravo My Life 브라보 마이 라이프	Park Young-hoon	Baek Yoon-sik; Im Ha-ryong	6 September	73,034	
Breath 숨	Kim Ki-duk	Chang Chen; Park Ji-ah	26 April	12,293	Entered into the 2007 Cannes Film Festival
Bunt 날아라 허동구	Park Kyu-tae	Jung Jin-young; Choi Woo-hyuk	26 April	396,811	
Champion Mabbak 챔피언 마빡이	Kim Hyun-soo	Jeong Jong-cheol; Park Joon-hyung	8 August		Also known as Mappak the Champion.
Cheaters 내 여자의 남자친구	Park Seong-beom	Choi Won-young; Ko Da-mi	22 March	5,587	
The Cut 해부학교실	Son Tae-woong	Han Ji-min; On Joo-wan	11 July	622,400	
D-War 디 워	Shim Hyung-rae	Jason Behr; Amanda Brooks; Robert Forster	1 August	8,426,973	The most expensive South Korean film (as of 2007), with a budget of $33 million.
Desert Dream 경계	Zhang Lu	Bat-ulzii; Suh Jung; Shin Dong-ho	8 November	973	A co-production between South Korea, Mongolia and France.
Digital Short Films by Three Filmmakers 2006 디지털 삼인 삼색 2006	Darezhan Omirbaev; Eric Khoo; Pen-ek Ratanaruang	Ainur Turgambayeva; Syamsiah; Ananda Everingham	4 January	358	Three 30-minute films commissioned by the Jeonju International Film Festival.
Driving with My Wife's Lover 아내의 애인을 만나다	Kim Tae-shik	Park Kwang-jeong; Jeong Bo-seok	26 April	6,999	
An Elephant on the Bike 파란 자전거	Kwon Yong-guk	Yang Jin-woo; Kim Jung-hwa	19 April	2,355	
Eleventh Mom 열한번째 엄마	Kim Jin-seong	Kim Hye-soo; Kim Young-chan	29 November	350,204	Also known as My 11th Mother.
Epitaph 기담	Jeong Brothers	Jin Goo; Kim Tae-woo	1 August	678,546	
Evil Twin 전설의 고향	Kim Ji-hwan	Park Shin-hye; Jae Hee	23 May	402,117	
Fantastic Parasuicides 판타스틱 자살 소동	Park Su-young; Cho Chang-ho; Kim Seong-ho	Han Yeo-reum; Kim Nam-jin; Jeong Jae-jin	8 November	1,702	Omnibus feature composed of three short films made by three directors.
Femme Fatale 죽어도 해피 엔딩	Kang Gyeong-hun	Ye Ji-won; Im Won-hee	22 August	192,686	
For Eternal Hearts 별빛 속으로	Hwang Qu-dok	Jung Kyung-ho; Kim Min-sun	9 August	6,724	
Girl by Girl 소녀X소녀	Park Dong-hoon	Kwak Ji-min; Im Seong-eon	25 January	1,952	
Going by the Book 바르게 살자	Ra Hee-chan	Jung Jae-young; Son Byong-ho	18 October	2,190,250	
A Good Day to Have an Affair 바람피기 좋은날	Jang Moon-il	Kim Hye-soo; Yoon Jin-seo	8 February	1,847,875	
Le Grand Chef 식객	Jeon Yun-su	Kim Kang-woo; Im Won-hee	1 November	3,038,868	
Hansel and Gretel 헨젤과 그레텔	Yim Pil-sung	Chun Jung-myung; Shim Eun-kyung	27 December	314,304	
Happiness 행복	Hur Jin-ho	Im Soo-jung; Hwang Jung-min	3 October	1,239,789	
The Happy Life 즐거운 인생	Lee Joon-ik	Jung Jin-young; Kim Yoon-seok	12 September	1,263,835	
Heavenly Path 천상고원	Kim Eung-su	Lee Jae-won; Kim Eung-su	31 May	918	
Herb 허브	Heo In-mu	Kang Hye-jung; Bae Jong-ok	11 January	1,406,199	
HERs 허스	Kim Jeong-joong	Kim Hye-na; Elizabeth Weisbaum	2 August	597	
Highway Star 복면 달호	Kim Sang-chan, Kim Hyun-soo	Cha Tae-hyun; Im Chae-moo	14 February	1,611,192	
Hotel M: Gangster's Last Draw 마강호텔	Choi Seong-cheol	Kim Suk-hoon; Kim Seong-eun	22 February	237,183	
Hwang Jin Yi 황진이	Chang Yoon-hyun	Song Hye-kyo; Yoo Ji-tae	6 June	1,270,644	
In Between Days 방황의 날들	So Yong Kim	Jiseon Kim; Taegu Andy Kang	6 September	1,285	A joint production between the US, Canada and South Korea.
Jeonju Digital Project 2007: Memories	Eugene Green; Pedro Costa; Harun Farocki	Delphine Hecquet; Francois Riviere; Alfredo Mendes	29 November	280	Three 30-minute films commissioned by the Jeonju International Film Festival.
Let's Not Cry	Min Boung-hun	Muhamad Rahimov	30 August	1,813	
A Love 사랑	Kwak Kyung-taek	Joo Jin-mo; Park Si-yeon	19 September	2,123,815	
Love Exposure 어깨너머의 연인	Lee Eon-hee	Lee Mi-yeon; Lee Tae-ran	18 October	301,153	
Love Now 지금 사랑하는 사람과 살고 있습니까?	Jeong Yoon-soo	Uhm Jung-hwa; Park Yong-woo; Han Chae-young	15 August	1,095,119	Also known as Changing Partners.
M 엠	Lee Myung-se	Kang Dong-won; Lee Yeon-hee	25 October	448,350	
The Mafia, the Salesman 상사부일체 – 두사부일체 3	Shim Seung-bo	Lee Sung-jae; Kim Sung-min	10 September	947,510	The third film in the "My Boss, My Hero" series.
Mapado 2: Back to the Island 마파도 2	Lee Sang-hoon	Lee Moon-sik; Yeo Woon-kye	18 January	1,560,297	Sequel to the 2005 film Mapado.
Master Kims 김관장 대 김관장 대 김관장	Park Seong-gyun	Shin Hyun-joon; Choi Sung-kook	8 February	1,025,618	Also known as Three Kims.
May 18 화려한 휴가	Kim Ji-hoon	Kim Sang-kyung; Ahn Sung-ki	25 July	7,307,993	
Meet Mr. Daddy 눈부신 날에	Park Kwang-su	Park Shin-yang; Seo Shin-ae	19 April	285,825	Also known as Shiny Day.
Milky Way Liberation Front 은하해방전선	Yoon Seong-ho	Im Ji-kyu; Park Hyuk-kwon	29 November	5,051	
Miracle on 1st Street; 1번가의 기적	Yoon Je-kyoon	Im Chang-jung; Ha Ji-won	14 February	2,750,457	
Miss Gold Digger 용의주도 미스 신	Park Yong-jib	Han Ye-seul; Lee Jong-hyuk	18 December	595,862	
Mission Possible: Kidnapping Granny K 권순분 여사 납치사건	Kim Sang-jin	Na Moon-hee; Kang Sung-jin	12 September	1,619,190	
Mother 어머니는 죽지 않는다	Hah Myung-joong	Han Hye-sook; Hah Myung-joong	12 September	117,067	
Mr. Lee vs Mr. Lee 이대근, 이댁은	Shim Kwang-jin	Lee Dae-geun; Lee Doo-il	1 May	11,206	Also known as Long Day's Journey into Night.
Mug Travel 빼꼼의 머그잔 여행	Lim Aaron		22 March	135,261	Animation.
Muoi: The Legend of a Portrait 므이	Kim Tae-kyung	Jo An; Cha Ye-ryun; Ahn Thu	25 July	180,999	A joint production between South Korea and Vietnam.
My Father 마이 파더	Hwang Dong-hyuk	Daniel Henney; Kim Yeong-cheol	6 September	902,090	
My Love 내 사랑	Lee Han	Kam Woo-sung; Choi Kang-hee	18 December	977,859	
My Son 아들	Jang Jin	Cha Seung-won; Ryu Deok-hwan	1 May	488,221	
My Tutor Friend 2 동갑내기 과외하기 레슨 II	Ji Ki-woong; Kim Ho-jeong	Lee Chung-ah; Park Ki-woong	19 April	566,498	Sequel to the 2003 film My Tutor Friend.
Never Forever 두 번째 사랑	Gina Kim	Vera Farmiga; Ha Jung-woo	21 June	80,248	A joint production between South Korea and the USA.
Off Road 오프 로드	Han Seung-ryong	Jo Han-chul; Baek Su-jang	30 August	561	
The Old Garden 오래된 정원	Im Sang-soo	Ji Jin-hee; Yum Jung-ah	4 January	296,532	
Our School 우리 학교	Kim Myeong-joon		29 March	59,752	Documentary.
Our Town 우리 동네	Jeong Gil-yeong	Oh Man-seok; Ryu Deok-hwan	29 November	377,591	
Paradise Murdered 극락도 살인사건	Kim Han-min	Park Hae-il; Park Sol-mi	12 April	2,259,511	
People Crossing the River 강을 건너는 사람들	Kim Duk-chul		30 November	315	Documentary.
The Perfect Couple 최강 로맨스	Kim Jeong-woo	Hyun Young; Lee Dong-wook	25 January	1,299,274	
Pornmaking for Dummies 색화동	Gong Ja-kwan	Jo Jae-wan; Kim Dong-soo	15 November	498	
Project Makeover 언니가 간다	Kim Chang-rae	Ko So-young; Jo An	4 January	174,543	
Pruning the Grapevine 포도나무를 베어라	Min Byeong-hoon	Seo Jang-won; Lee Min-jung	22 February	6,977	
Punch Lady 펀치 레이디	Kang Hyo-jin	Do Ji-won; Son Hyun-joo	25 October	38,254	
The Railroad 경의선	Park Heung-sik	Kim Kang-woo; Son Tae-young	10 May	4,025	
Rainbow Eyes 가면	Yang Yun-ho	Kim Kang-woo; Kim Min-sun	27 December	324,214	
Resurrection of the Butterfly 그림자	Kim Min-sook; Lee Jung-gook	Lee Mu-saeng; Jeon Bo-young	11 October	224	
Robot Taekwon V 로보트 태권V	Kim Cheong-gi		18 January	705,207	Animation. Originally released in 1976.
Scout 스카우트	Kim Hyun-seok	Im Chang-jung; Uhm Ji-won	14 November	315,187	
Secret Sunshine 밀양	Lee Chang-dong	Jeon Do-yeon; Song Kang-ho	23 May	1,710,364	Won "Best Film" at the 6th Korean Film Awards. South Korea's submission to the 80th Academy Awards for "Best Foreign Language Film". Entered at Cannes.
Seven Days 세븐 데이즈	Won Shin-yun	Yunjin Kim; Park Hee-soon	14 November	2,107,849	
Sex Is Zero 2 색즉시공 시즌 2	Yoon Tae-yoon	Im Chang-jung; Song Ji-hyo	12 December	2,088,940	Sequel to the 2002 film Sex Is Zero.
Shadows in the Palace 궁녀	Kim Mee-jeung	Park Jin-hee; Yoon Se-ah	18 October	1,438,531	
A Shark 상어	Kim Dong-hyun	Goo Seong-hwan; Hong Seung-il	10 May	790	
She Is 멋진 그녀들	Joo Hyeon-sook		1 August		Documentary.
The Show Must Go On 우아한 세계	Han Jae-rim	Song Kang-ho; Oh Dal-su; Park Ji-young	5 April	1,025,781	Won "Best Picture" at the 2007 Blue Dragon Film Awards.
Skeletons in the Closet 좋지 아니한가	Jeong Yoon-cheol	Chun Ho-jin; Kim Hye-soo	28 February	321,721	Also known as Shim's Family.
Small Town Rivals 이장과 군수	Jang Gyu-seong	Cha Seung-won; Yoo Hae-jin	29 March	1,269,142	
Someone Behind You 두 사람이다	Oh Ki-hwan	Yoon Jin-seo; Park Ki-woong	22 August	241,292	Also released in the U.S. in 2009 and also known as "Voices"
Soo 수	Choi Yang-il	Ji Jin-hee; Kang Sung-yeon	22 March	218,314	
Sorrow Even Up in Heaven 저 하늘에도 슬픔이	Han Myeong-gu	Kim Yu-na; Park Nam	17 May	24,892	
Swindler in My Mom's House 사랑방 선수와 어머니	Im Young-seong	Jung Joon-ho; Kim Won-hee	22 August	541,236	Also known as The Houseguest and My Mother.
Taxi Blues 택시 블루스	Choi-ha Dong-ha		21 December	420	Documentary.
Temptation of Eve: Angel 이브의 유혹 – 엔젤	Im Kyung-taek	Shin So-mi, Jeong Ui-gap	30 July	425	
Temptation of Eve: A Good Wife 이브의 유혹 – 좋은 아내	Kwak Jeong-deok	Kim Tae-hyun; Ahn Nae-sang	6 August	316	
Temptation of Eve: Her Own Technique 이브의 유혹 – 그녀만의 테크닉	Ju Jae-wan	Kim Ji-wan; Seo Young	20 August	317	Also known as Temptation of Eve: Her Own Art.
Temptation of Eve: Kiss 이브의 유혹 – 키스	Nam Ki-woong	Kim Kyeong-ik; Yoon Mi-kyeong	13 August	231	
Texture of Skin 살결	Lee Sung-gang	Kim Yoon-tae; Kim Joo-ryoung	10 May	840	
Time Between Dog and Wolf 개와 늑대 사이의 시간	Jeon Soo-il	Ahn Gil-kang; Kim Seon-jae	21 June	579	
Two Faces of My Girlfriend 두 얼굴의 여친	Lee Seok-hoon	Bong Tae-gyu; Jung Ryeo-won	12 September	762,112	
Underground Rendezvous 만남의 광장	Kim Jong-jin	Im Chang-jung; Park Jin-hee	15 August	1,306,434	
Unstoppable Marriage 못말리는 결혼	Kim Seong-wook	Kim Soo-mi; Eugene	10 May	1,304,431	
Venus and Mars 싸움	Han Ji-seung	Sul Kyung-gu; Kim Tae-hee	12 December	382,422	
Virgin Snow 첫눈	Han Sang-hee	Lee Joon-gi; Aoi Miyazaki	1 November	19,734	A joint production between Japan and South Korea.
Voice of a Murderer 그놈 목소리	Park Jin-pyo	Sul Kyung-gu; Kim Nam-joo	1 February	3,143,247	
West 32nd 웨스트 32번가	Michael Kang	John Cho; Jun-seong Kim; Grace Park	22 November	8,321	A joint production between South Korea and the USA.
Who's That Knocking At My Door? 저수지에서 건진 치타	Yang Hae-hoon	Im Ji-kyu; Yoon So-si	25 October	2,551	
Wide Awake 리턴	Lee Kyu-man	Kim Myung-min; Kim Tae-woo	8 August	677,939	
With a Girl of Black Soil 검은 땅의 소녀와	Jeon Soo-il	Yoo Yeon-mi; Park Hyeon-woo; Jo Yeong-jin	15 November	786	Won the "Golden Durian" at the 10th Barcelona Asian Film Festival
The Wonder Years 열세살, 수아	Kim Hee-jung	Lee Se-young; Chu Sang-mi	14 June	6,719	
The Worst Guy Ever 내 생애 최악의 남자	Son Hyun-hee	Yum Jung-ah; Tak Jae-hoon	30 August	470,548	Also known as The Worst Man of My Life.
Yobi, the Five Tailed Fox 천년여우 여우비	Lee Sung-gang	Son Ye-jin; Ryu Deok-hwan	25 January	482,992	Animation.

== See also ==
- 2007 in South Korea
- 2007 in South Korean music
- Box office number-one films of 2007 (South Korea)
