= List of 2007 box office number-one films in South Korea =

This is a list of films which have been placed number-one at the South Korean box office during 2007, based on admissions.

== Number-one films ==
†	This implies the highest-grossing movie of the year.

Weekend End Date	Film title	Weekend Admissions	Ref.
7 January	Night at the Museum	500,661	
14 January	Eragon	358,443	
21 January	Mapado 2: Back to the Island	508,590	
28 January	The Perfect Couple	380,933	
4 February	Voice of a Murderer	972,620	
11 February	A Good Day to Have an Affair	384,447	
18 February	Miracle on 1st Street	486,305	
25 February	Miracle on 1st Street	395,849	
4 March	Miracle on 1st Street	223,298	
11 March	The Illusionist	218,967	
18 March	300	748,203	
25 March	300	536,324	
1 April	Small Town Rivals	440,516	
8 April	The Show Must Go On	336,529	
15 April	Paradise Murdered	513,536	
22 April	Paradise Murdered	338,491	
29 April	Paradise Murdered	260,084	
6 May	Spider-Man 3	1,566,420	
13 May	Spider-Man 3	881,350	
20 May	Spider-Man 3	371,223	
27 May	Pirates of the Caribbean: At World's End	1,484,222	
3 June	Pirates of the Caribbean: At World's End	693,269	
10 June	Shrek the Third	823,039	
17 June	Ocean's Thirteen	404,421	
24 June	Black House	377,195	
1 July	Transformers	1,580,128	
8 July	Transformers	1,539,798	
15 July	Harry Potter and the Order of the Phoenix	1,459,395	
22 July	Live Free or Die Hard	818,775	
29 July	May 18	1,053,759	
5 August	D-War †	1,931,943	
12 August	D-War †	1,427,771	
19 August	D-War †	663,024	
26 August	May 18	328,974	
2 September	Disturbia	223,927	
9 September	My Father	297,456	
16 September	The Bourne Ultimatum	404,400	
23 September	A Love	400,125	
30 September	A Love	343,194	
7 October	Happiness	322,390	
14 October	Happiness	217,588	
21 October	Going by the Book	464,699	
28 October	Going by the Book	435,031	
4 November	Le Grand Chef	467,896	
11 November	Le Grand Chef	521,617	
18 November	Le Grand Chef	390,078	
25 November	Seven Days	328,367	
2 December	August Rush	309,258	
9 December	August Rush	254,767	
16 December	I Am Legend	678,619	
23 December	The Golden Compass	610,207	
30 December	The Golden Compass	332,053	

== Highest-grossing films ==
Highest-grossing films of 2007 (by admissions)
Rank	Title	Country	Admissions	Domestic gross
1.	D-War	South Korea	7,855,441	US$43.5 million
2.	Transformers	United States	7,389,696	US$42 million
3.	May 18	South Korea	6,855,300	US$38.9 million
4.	Spider-Man 3	United States	4,592,309	US$26 million
5.	Pirates of the Caribbean: At World's End	United States	4,571,229	US$25.7 million
6.	Harry Potter and the Order of the Phoenix	United Kingdom; United States	3,691,060	US$20.2 million
7.	Live Free or Die Hard	United States	3,176,937	US$18.2 million
8.	Voice of a Murderer	South Korea	2,972,299	US$15.5 million
9.	Le Grand Chef	South Korea	2,963,196	US$16.7 million
10.	300	United States	2,929,561	US$16.5 million

Highest-grossing domestic films of 2007 (by admissions)
Rank	Title	Admissions	Domestic gross
1.	D-War	7,855,441	US$43.5 million
2.	May 18	6,855,300	US$38.9 million
3.	Voice of a Murderer	2,972,299	US$15.5 million
4.	Le Grand Chef	2,963,196	US$16.7 million
5.	200 Pounds Beauty	2,856,615	US$15.3 million
6.	Miracle on 1st Street	2,535,431	US$13.7 million
7.	Going by the Book	2,135,606	US$12.3 million
8.	Paradise Murdered	2,079,989	US$11.7 million
9.	Seven Days	2,036,035	US$12 million
10.	A Love	2,023,174	US$11.9 million

== See also ==
- List of South Korean films of 2007
