= LGBTQ representation in South Korean film and television =

Representation of lesbian, gay, bisexual, transgender, and queer (i.e., LGBTQ) characters and themes in South Korean film and television remains a relatively small part of the country's overall media landscape. Discussions about such portrayals have grown both in academia and public LGBTQ movements. The South Korean LGBTQ rights movement, which gained momentum in the 1990s, contributed to increased visibility of queer characters and relationships in film and television. While South Korea has historically been less accepting of LGBTQ identities, attitudes are gradually changing. A study conducted at Chonnam National University found a growing acceptance of homosexuality in South Korea.

The advent of social media, has facilitated the cultural consumption and creation of LGBTQ narratives, leading to increased representation in cinema and television. Activism and queer cinema have often intersected, as seen in initiatives like the Korean Queer Film Festival, which began in 1998. The festival underscores the close ties between activism and representation in South Korean media.

== History of LGBTQ media in South Korea ==
Efforts by organizations such as the Rainbow Foundation and Chingusai have helped shape public attitudes and foster greater representation of LGBTQ themes in South Korean media. Contributors to queer Korean media discourse such as film, television and music include Ungsan Kim, Chung-kang Kim, Merose Hwang, Grace Jung, Jungmin Kwon, Ji-Hoon Park, Thomas Baudinette and Kristine Michelle L. Santos.

== Examples of South Korean queer cinema ==
Below is a list of some of the films and television series that have had LGBTQ themes:

=== Film ===
Film	Year	Description
Memento Mori	1999	The ghost of a lesbian high-school girl takes revenge on the people who used to bully her. And another young girl finds her old diary detailing her love and rejection when she was alive.
Yok mang (Desire)	2002	A middle class husband begins a gay affair with a male prostitute. In the process of uncovering the affair the wife also enters into an affair with the same prostitute.
Camellia Project: Three Queer Stories at Bogil Island	2005	This movie features three separate stories of gay relationships. The first story is titled Kim Chu-ja and it details two men who were in a relationship in the past life who meet again in the present. The second story is titled Drifting Island and it is about a gay couple that is on the verge of breaking up. The last story is titled La Traviata and it centers a wife who finds out about her husband's homosexuality.
The King and the Clown	2005	The film is credited as popularizing and coining the phenomenon of "pretty boy or flower boy" and raised questions of gendered consumption and/or commodification of a certain type of LGBT community and the role of media within these processes. Shin has raised concerns on the role of King and the Clown in capitalizing on this hybrid notion of homosexuality for success while not truly giving the platform for the LGBT communities.
No Regret	2006	The film has been credited as "the first 'real' Korean gay feature", (although earlier South Korean films, such as Road Movie, released in 2002, have dealt with gay relationships), and is also the first South Korean feature to be directed by an openly gay Korean filmmaker.
Like a Virgin	2006	The film focuses on a trans teenager who is determined to save money for the transitioning surgery. She is approached by a ssireum coach who determines her to be perfect for the sport. The main character refuses until she learns about the potential to win a large cash prize.
Antique	2008	Based on Fumi Yoshinaga's manga Antique Bakery, the film focuses on four men working at a bakery, one of whom is gay and has had a long-term crush on the bakery owner.
Boy Meets Boy	2008	This short film portrays a relationship between two guys who are just beginning to fall in love. It is set on a bus where the two characters meet and exchanges various eye contacts.
A Frozen Flower	2008	This film takes place in the Goryeo dynasty. With the pressure to continue the lineage through a son, the King instructs his military commander to impregnate the Queen. The military commander is surprised by this request especially because he has been in a relationship with the King. The commander and the Queen finally accept the request, but their relationship develops into more than just the dutiful relationship for reproduction. The plot is complicated when King finds out about their secret relationship and jealousy and betrayal take over him.
Hello My Love	2009	Ten years into their relationship a boyfriend leaves to study abroad, promising that he will marry his girlfriend upon his return. Once he returns he brings with him a man he claims is only a friend, only for the girlfriend to discover that the two of them are lovers.
Just Friends?	2009	This short film features two characters who are in love. In the short duration of the film, it portrays their love, their struggle with coming out to one of the character's mom and their undeterred love to each other.
Lady Daddy	2010	This film presents a transgender woman who receives a surprise visit from someone claiming that he is her son. The son reveals that the main character is his father.
Ashamed	2010	This film features a lesbian art director who searches for a nude model for her next project. That is how she meets Yoon Ji-woo, who also happens to share the same name as the art director, whose name is Jung Ji-woo. As they spend time together to finish the project, Yoon Ji-woo shares her past of her ex-girlfriend who also shares their name Ji-woo. This film revolves around these three women as they share this connection through their name and love.
Two Weddings and a Funeral	2012	Gay romantic comedy film that explores the taboos and intolerance in Korean society in the story of a gay man and lesbian who enter into a sham marriage.
Man on High Heels	2014	This film is about a character that wants to go through gender-affirming surgery and is also an infamous crime detective.
The Handmaiden	2016	Set during the 1930s, the film is inspired by the novel Fingersmith by Welsh writer Sarah Waters and features a lesbian couple from different backgrounds.

=== Television ===
Show	Year(s)	Description
Ireland	2004	A minor character reveals that he was in love with the main character's father, and because of this he has taken care of the main character for years. The main character is shocked by this revelation.
Beating Heart	2005	The show consists of six different story lines that focus on the topic of love and relationships, one of which is dedicated to LGBT relationships.
Life Is Beautiful	2010	A drama series that revolves around multiple generations of a single family and their everyday lives, struggles, and loves. The series has received praise for its portrayal of a loving, openly gay couple in a Korean drama on primetime network television.
Personal Taste	2010	The plot revolves around a man who pretends to be gay. His boss, who actually is gay, propositions him, and is tactfully turned down.
Secret Garden	2010	A secondary character is gay. He has a crush on the second male lead, which sets up a love triangle.
Sungkyunkwan Scandal	2010	One of the four main characters is gay. He has a crush on his best friend. It is not reciprocated. Meanwhile, the main male lead falls in love with a person he believes is a man, but is actually a woman in disguise. He struggles with what he believes to be a homosexual attraction.
Lily Fever	2015	Web series about a lesbian relationship.
Cheese in the Trap	2016	The main character discovers her boss and her neighbor are in a gay relationship with each other. They are attempting to keep their relationship a secret.
Prison Playbook	2017	The show is about a baseball player who is sent to jail for a year. One of the characters who share the jail space is gay.
Be Melodramatic	2019	The series features three best friends who all carry their own traumas and burdens. They end up living together with one of the character's gay brother. The series focus on their daily lives of friendship and love.
Where Your Eyes Linger	2020	A web series about two high school students who are best friends named Tae Joo and Gang Gook. However, they don't have a typical friendship as Gang Gook also serves as an unofficial bodyguard for the other school boy who is the sole heir of a chaebol family. As the web series progresses, both school boys begin to realize their suppressed feelings for each other.
Mr. Heart	2020	Mr. Heart is a web series showcasing the relationship between a rising marathon star and pacemaker.
Wish You	2020	A series about a singer songwriter named Kang In Soo and keyboardist Yoon Sang Yi.
Color Rush	2020–2021	Based on Se Sang's web novel with the same title, Color Rush tells the story of school boy Yeon Woo who can only see the world in varying tones of grey. That is until he crosses paths with Yoo Han, who causes him to see sudden rushes of color every time he walks past.
Light on Me	2021	Woo Tae-kyung is an 18-year-old Korean average boy who has no friends. One day, his teacher approached him in order to suggest him to join the school's student council. Tae-kyung proceeds to enjoy his new social life and starts questioning if he may or may not like one of his fellow council members.
Nobleman Ryu's Wedding	2021	It occurs during the Joseon dynasty, the wedding of Ryu Ho Seon and the beautiful bride Choi Hwa Jin begins. But on the first night, the bride he expected is suspicious. It's not a woman, but a man!
Tinted With You	2021	A series about a high school student name Jung Eun Ho who falls through a magical painting and gets transported back to the Joseon dynasty, where he falls in love with the crown prince Lee Heon.
To My Star	2021–2022	A follow up project of the web series Where Your Eyes Linger, a series about a famous celebrity who goes into hiding after he's public scandal reveals. In his hideout, he gets acquainted with his new roommate, an ordinary man who leads a modest, unassuming life. As they spend time together, a romance blossoms between these two roommates from very different walks of life.
Mine	2022	Series about three women tied to a chaebol family whose lives are transformed as they seek to find their true 'mine'. The series features the first lesbian lead character in a K-drama.
Squid Game	2024	The second season features an openly transgender woman, seeking to finish her transition with the prize money from completing several deadly games. Hwang Dong-hyuk, the director of Squid Game, chose Park Sung-hoon, a cisgender man to play the role due to a distinct lack of openly transgender actors in South Korea with the hope that "By creating a character much like Cho Hyun-ju, and through her choices, her actions, and the way she carries herself in the game, I hope that that could raise awareness of these issues we face today."
