= Jung In-gi =

South Korean actor

- Born: September 12, 1966 (age 60); Gyeonggi Province, South Korea
- Occupation: Actor
- Years active: 1990–present
- Agent: Baewooneun Entertainment

Korean name
- Hangul: 정인기
- Hanja: 鄭寅基
- RR: Jeong Ingi
- MR: Chŏng In'gi

Jung In-gi (born September 12, 1966) is a South Korean actor. Jung made his acting debut in 1990, and has remained active in mainstream and independent film as well as television, notably in Jury (2013), The Five (2013) and Gap-dong (2014).

== Filmography ==
=== Film ===
Year	Title	Role	Notes
1994	The Fox with Nine Tails		
1995	A Single Spark	Young-soo's junior colleague	
1997	Downfall		
1999	The Uprising	Kang Hee-yong	
2001	Killing Pig	Adult Ma-eul	short film
2001	Young-ja	Dae-choon	short film
2002	Lovers' Concerto	Taxi driver	
2002	Addicted	Caregiver	
2003	His Truth Is Marching On	Pastor/Detective Jung	short film
2003	Oh! Happy Day	Section chief Park	
2003	Singles	Chef	
2003	Detective Office - Please, Find Myself		short film
2003	Lost & Found		short film
2003	Another Paradise	Cha Bong-deok	short film
2004	Sara Jeanne	Bartender	short film
2004	Mokpo, Gangster's Paradise	Boxing gym director	
2004	Samaritan Girl	Gi-soo	
2004	Hypnotized	Min-seok's team leader	
2004	The Scarlet Letter	Detective Ahn	
2004	Twentidentity	Senior colleague	segment: "Race"
2004	A Grand Day Out	Man at flea market	short film
2005	The President's Last Bang	Deputy Shin	
2005	Crying Fist	Doctor	
2005	The Twins	Photographer	
2005	Innocent Steps	Manager	
2005	Monkey in the Pool	Gu Won-chul/Chugeumjabu	short film
2005	Reading or Feeding		
2005	About a Bad Boy		short film
2005	Love Is a Crazy Thing	Section chief Jung	
2006	Forbidden Quest	Colleague	
2006	Shin Sung-il Is Lost	Man in pizza shop	
2006	For Horowitz	Ji-soo's older brother	
2006	Don't Look Back	Man having an affair	
2006	The Host	Doctor at isolation hospital	
2006	Illegal Parking		short film
2006	Maundy Thursday	Jung Min-seok	
2006	Tazza: The High Rollers	Warehouse security guard	
2006	Traces of Love	Prosecutor	
2006	Solace	Shim In-ku's friend	
2006	The Blue Monday	Workplace boss	short film
2007	Herb	Train station ticket seller	
2007	The Perfect Couple	Newspaper boss	
2007	The Show Must Go On	Police chief	
2007	The Railroad	Locomotive engineer (cameo)	
2007	Black House	Detective Oh	
2007	May 18	Jin-chul	
2007	Attack on the Pin-Up Boys	Judo team coach	
2007	Someone Behind You	Detective Jo	
2007	The Worst Guy Ever	Writer	
2007	Bravo My Life	Man on bench	
2007	Sunshower	Man	short film
2007	M	Doctor	
2007	Our Town	Lieutenant 2	
2008	Hellcats	Cafe owner	
2008	The Chaser	Detective Lee Gil-woo	
2008	Vacant Room	Dad	short film
2008	Lioness(es)	Sung-chil	short film
2008	Natasha	Hyun-jung's ex-husband	short film
2008	Super Salon Twilight Zone	Shaving man	short film
2008	My New Partner	Team leader	
2008	Crossing	Sang-cheol	
2008	Eye for an Eye	Hwang Min-cheol	
2008	The Divine Weapon	Sa-chan	
2008	A Light Sleep	Yeol-rin's father	
2009	Breathless	Basement dad	
2009	One Step More to the Sea	Jung-ah's husband	
2009	The Guy Who Wanna Survive		short film
2009	Deaf Fish and Moon		short film
2009	Boat		
2009	The Pit and the Pendulum	Taxi driver	
2009	Yoga	Kang Hee-joong	
2009	LaLa Sunshine	Im Seon-jong	
2009	Searching for the Elephant	Detective	
2009	White Night	Kang Jae-doo	
2009	Secret	Squad leader Kang	
2009	Jeon Woo-chi: The Taoist Wizard	Director	
2010	Secret Reunion	Kim Seong-hak	
2010	Secret Love	Father Choi	
2010	House Family		short film
2010	My Dear Desperado	ex-Lieutenant Park	
2010	The Decisive Moment		short film
2010	Helping Hand		short film
2010	No Doubt	Detective Baek Yong-kwon	
2010	Passerby #3	Passerby 1	
2010	Broken Night	Kyung-pyo	short film
2011	Detective K: Secret of the Virtuous Widow	Magistrate	
2011	Midnight Express		short film
2011	The Front Line	Lee Sang-eok	
2011	Link	National Forensic Service director	
2011	Sector 7	Cha Hae-joon's father	
2011	The Recorder Exam	Father	short film
2011	Ordinary Days	Hyo-ri's dad	segment: "AMONG"
2011	The King of Pigs	Publisher (voice)	
2011	Sunday Punch	Governor Park	
2012	Wonderful Radio	Shin Jin-ah's father	
2012	Howling	Coroner	
2012	Over My Dead Body	Han Jin-soo	
2012	Two Weddings and a Funeral	Taxi driver (cameo)	
2012	Deranged	Sales office manager	
2012	The Neighbor	Kim Hong-jung	
2012	Modern Family	Sang-woo	segment: "Circle Line"
2012	The Tower	Section head Cha	
2013	Jury	Director Jung	short film
2013	Mr. Go	Gong In-gu	
2013	Dinner	Sung-min	short film
2013	The Spy: Undercover Operation	CEO Yeom	
2013	If You Were Me 6	Company president	segment: "Ice River"
2013	Steel Cold Winter	Hae-won's father	
2013	The Five	Cheol-min	
2013	Homo Coreanicus		short film
2014	Miss Granny	Ban Hyun-chul's doctor friend	
2014	The Legacy	Han Jae-woong	
2014	Haemoo	Oh-nam	
2014	Night Flight	Gi-woong's father	
2015	The Treacherous	Head of Sungkyunkwan	
2015	The Long Way Home	Sergeant Kim	
2015	Light My Fire		short film
2015	Collective Invention	Dong-sik	
2016	Spirits' Homecoming	Jung-min's father	
2016	Will You Be There?	Yoon	Special appearance
2016	Pandora	Fire marshal	
2017	The Outlaws	Chief of Police	Special appearance
2017	The King	High rank prosecutor	
2017	Biting Fly	Kang Man-sik	
2017	The Star Next Door	Representative Yoo	Special appearance
2017	1987: When the Day Comes	Priest Kim Seung-hoon	Special appearance
2018	Herstory	Choi	
2018	House of Hummingbird	Father	
2019	Black Money	Priest	Special appearance
2020	Pawn	Translator Noh	
2022	The Roundup	Chief of Geumcheon Police Station	Special appearance
2022	2037		

=== Television series ===
Year	Title	Role
2007	When Spring Comes	Detective Moon
2007	Drama City – "The Story of Martial and Jokgu"	Chang-soo
2008	Painter of the Wind	Hong Guk-yeong
2008	Worlds Within	Cinematographer
2010	Dong Yi	Kim Hwan
2010	Secret Garden	Gil Ik-seon
2011	The Duo	Soe-dol
2011	Cool Guys, Hot Ramen	Yang Chul-dong
2012	Late Blossom	Kim In-sub
2012	The King of Dramas	Gu Young-mok
2012	Cheongdam-dong Alice	Han Deuk-ki
2013	7th Grade Civil Servant	Kim Sung-joon
2013	Don't Look Back: The Legend of Orpheus	Han Young-man
2013	Drama Special Series – "Puberty Medley"	Choi Jung-woo's father
2013	Two Weeks	Yang Taek-nam
2013	KBS Drama Special – "Yeon-woo's Summer"	Lee Moo-woong
2014	Gap-dong	Cha Do-hyeok
2014	Doctor Stranger	Kim Tae-sool
2014	KBS Drama Special – "The Girl Who Became a Photo"	Park Chul-ho
2014	Pinocchio	Ki Ho-sang
2015	A Girl Who Sees Smells	Oh Jae-pyo
2015	Who Are You: School 2015	Park Joon-hyung
2015	Remember	In-ah's father
2016	Lucky Romance	Ahn Young-il
2016	Squad 38	Sa Jae-sung
2016	Weightlifting Fairy Kim Bok-joo	Jung Joon-hyung's father
2017	Queen of Mystery	Jang Woo-sup
2017	Manhole	
2017	Hospital Ship	Kwak-sung
2017	KBS Drama Special – "If We Were a Season"	Yoon Gi-hyeon
2018	Queen of Mystery 2	Jang Woo-sub
2018	Come and Hug Me	Go Yi-seok
2018	Bad Papa	Cha Seung-ho
2019	The Fiery Priest	Nam Suk-goo
2019	Welcome to Waikiki 2	Han Soo-yeon's father
2019	My Absolute Boyfriend	Uhm Da-da's father
2020	Good Casting	Seo Gook-hwan
2020	Please Don't Date Him	Seo JI Seong's father
2021	Undercover	Kim Myung-jae
2021	One the Woman	Kang Myung-guk
2022	Blind	Yeom Ki Nam
2024	Nothing Uncovered	Kang In-han

=== Music video appearances ===
Year	Song title	Artist
2012	"Sorry I'm Sorry"	Kim Hyung-jun

== Theater ==
Year	Title	Role	Notes/Ref.
1990	진짜 노동자		Madang-guk

== Awards and nominations ==
Year	Award	Category	Nominated work	Result
2005	3rd Asiana International Short Film Festival	Face in Shorts Award	About a Bad Boy	Won
2006	5th Mise-en-scène Short Film Festival	Special Jury Prize	Illegal Parking	Won
2011	28th Busan International Short Film Festival	Best Actor	Broken Night	Won
