= The Tower (2012 South Korean film) =

- Theatrical release poster
- Hangul: 타워
- RR: Tawo
- MR: T'awŏ
- Directed by: Kim Ji-hoon
- Written by: Kim Sang-don; Heo Jun-seok
- Produced by: Lee Han-seung; Lee Su-man
- Starring: Sul Kyung-gu; Son Ye-jin; Kim Sang-kyung
- Cinematography: Kim Young-ho
- Edited by: Kim Sang-bum; Kim Jae-bum
- Music by: Kim Tae-seong
- Production company: The Tower Pictures
- Distributed by: CJ Entertainment
- Release date: December 25, 2012
- Running time: 121 minutes
- Country: South Korea
- Language: Korean
- Budget: US$9.3 million
- Box office: US$36.4 million

The Tower (Korean: 타워) is a 2012 South Korean disaster thriller film directed by Kim Ji-hoon, and stars Sul Kyung-gu, Son Ye-jin and Kim Sang-kyung in the lead roles. It depicts a fire that breaks out in a luxury skyscraper in central Seoul on Christmas Eve after an aviation accident involving a helicopter. The film was released in theaters on December 25, 2012.

== Plot ==
Lee Dae-ho is a single father and building manager of Tower Sky, a 120-story luxurious twin-tower building complex located in Yeouido, Seoul. Despite promising his daughter Ha-na to spend time on Christmas Eve, he is tasked to oversee the preparations of an upcoming luxury party hosted by Tower Sky's owner and president, Mr. Jo, and attended by tenants of the complex as well as several VIP's and South Korean politicians. During the inspections, Dae-ho detects the faulty water sprinklers was caused by frozen water pipes on the Riverview Tower, one of the two towers.

However, against safety concerns and the forecasted strong winds, Jo and Mr. Cha, the Tower Sky's safety section head, decide to push forward for the party. That night, two helicopters carrying heavy snowmakers—leased by Mr. Jo, are sprinkling snow over the party when updrafts causes them to spin out of control. One of the helicopters carrying the snowmaker strikes over the glass skybridge connecting the two towers, while the other plows through the Riverview Tower, causing it to combust and catch fire.

Pandemonium erupts as people attempt to flee while the fires spread unopposed. Firefighters converge on the scene, as the firefighting squad; among being Sergeant Oh Byung-man and fresh-faced rookie Lee Sung-woo–led by Captain Kang Young-ki, who joined at the last minute despite being off-duty, enters the building when they bump into Dae-ho, who is frantically searching for his daughter, unaware that she is taking shelter inside the Chinese restaurant alongside Mr. Cha and Seo Yoon-hee, Dae-ho's romantic interest, among other survivors.

Dae-ho leads the firefighting team through the quickest path to the server room at the 63rd floor where the helicopter crashed. Despite Young-ki's resolute but risky maneuvers to extinguish the source of the fire, the flames continue spreading. Jo decides to activate the firewalls in a desperate move to contain the blaze, but it leaves Dae-ho–who has reunited with Ha-na and Yoon-hee, as well as many other people, trapped within the blazing floors. The firefighters attempt to destroy the firewall leading to the restaurant to free them, but the walls around the restaurant crumble in around itself, causing the entire floor to collapse. Dae-ho, under Yoon-hee's suggestion, directs the trapped survivors to jump onto the gondola in order to escape, but an elderly wealthy couple perishes during their descent.

Dae-ho's group tries to escape to the other tower, the Cityview Tower, by crossing the buckling skybridge between them, but the structure gives way and Cha falls to his death, while Ha-na and Sun-woo barely managed to escape and are lowered down to the surface by the helicopter. With the Riverview Tower at the risk of collapse, threatening Yeongdeungpo District, Fire Commissioner Jang prepares the team for a building implosion and orders everyone in and around the complex to evacuate. To slow down the rate of collapse, Young-ki uses Dae-ho's fingerprint access to discharge the tower's water tanks. The water torrent washes over the flames surrounding Byung-man and a group of religious followers led by church elder and Tower Sky's lottery winner, Mr. Kim, saving their lives.

Young-ki and Dae-ho then ride the freight elevator in free-fall to quickly descend to the surface, and alongside pregnant woman Nam-ok, they manage to climb out before the elevator slams into the basement parking garage, trapping Yon-hee and Byung-man and fatally impaling Kim in the debris. Dae-ho voluntarily goes back inside Tower Sky along with Young-ki and Sung-woo to rescue the trapped survivors. They leave the survivors on the storm drain and set out to detonate the rainwater storage tanks, hoping the fast-moving current will send them straight towards the Han River before the tower collapses. However, Young-ki loses the detonator before reaching the survivors.

Young-ki, after leaving his voicemail to his estranged wife, sacrifices his own life by manually detonating the explosives. The rushing torrent carries the group towards the river, right as the firefighters blow up the Riverview Tower. The survivors are pulled out from the water by the rescue team, and Sun-woo and Byung-man salute their fallen captain. A camera still shows a single white chocolate cake–reserved for Young-ki, sitting alone in an empty display case, and the 63 Building along the Yeongdeungpo District engulfed by dust from the demolished Riverview Tower.

== Cast ==
- Sul Kyung-gu as Captain Kang Young-ki
- Son Ye-jin as Seo Yoon-hee
- Kim Sang-kyung as Lee Dae-ho
- Kim In-kwon as Sergeant Oh Byung-man
- Ahn Sung-ki as Yeouido Fire Station chief Seo-jang
- Song Jae-ho as Mr. Yoon, the old man
- Lee Joo-shil as Mrs. Jung, Mr. Yoon's friend
- Lee Han-wi as Mr. Kim, church elder
- Kwon Tae-won as Jang, the Fire Commissioner
- Jeon Guk-hyang as Ae-ja
- Jung In-gi as Cha, the safety section head
- Cha In-pyo as President Jo
- Jeon Bae-soo as Young-cheol, the cook
- Kim Sung-oh as In-gun
- Min Young as Nam-ok, the pregnant woman
- Park Jun-seo as aide
- Lee Joo-ha as Min-jung, the receptionist
- Do Ji-han as Lee Sun-woo, the rookie fireman
- Jo Min-ah as Lee Ha-na, Dae-ho's daughter
- Lee Sang-hong as Yeouido fireman
- Jin Mo as Yeouido fireman
- Chu Min-ki as Yeouido fireman
- Kang Poong as Yeouido fireman
- Kwon Hyun-sang as Young-hoon
- Lee Chang-yong as command HQ specialist
- Lee Chang-joo as Jo's private secretary
- Park Chul-min as head cook
- Kim Eung-soo as Jin
- Park Jeong-hak as Jung
- Park Yong-su as Park
- Kim Soo-jin as Kang Young-ki's wife
- Nam Sang-seok as reporter in front of Tower Sky
- Kwon Young-hee as reporter in front of Tower Sky
- Lee Min-woo as reporter in front of Tower Sky

== Production ==
Director Kim Ji-hoon (who previously helmed Sector 7 and May 18) was inspired by the 1974 Hollywood film The Towering Inferno (which is based on the book, also called The Tower), and his personal experience seeing the 63 Building in Seoul for the first time as a middle school student and imagining how it would feel to be trapped inside.

The crew built 26 different sets to create various spaces in the fictional 108-story Tower Sky such as a Chinese restaurant, elevators and a pedestrian overpass between the two blocks. For the scenes involving water on the 80th floor, actors Sul Kyung-gu and Kim Sang-kyung filmed in a water container set in Goyang City, Gyeonggi Province, without using stuntmen.

Kim worked on the film's post-production for two years. 1,700 cuts out of 3,000 were based on CGI and 500 of the CG cuts were full 3-D cut scenes. For more authenticity, live action shoots were combined with CGI, such as the shooting of a miniature in the United States with a motion control camera for the ending scene.

== Box office ==
On its theater release on December 25, 2012, The Tower drew 431,759 admissions, the second highest opening day ticket sales in the history of Korean cinema (after The Thieves' 436,628). It sold two million tickets in its first week, 3.54 million by its second week, and 4.45 million by its third week. On January 22, 2013, it became the first Korean film in 2013 to reach the five million mark.

== International ==
The film was pre-sold by CJ Entertainment to Entertainment One in UK, Splendid in Germany, Benelux, Zylo for French-speaking territories, Horizon International in Turkey, Rainbow Entertainment in Singapore, Indonesia and Malaysia; and Jonon Source in Mongolia.

The Tower earned HK$4,733,937 at the Hong Kong box office.

== Awards and nominations ==
| Year | Award | Category | Nominated work | Result |
|---|---|---|---|---|
| 2013 | 49th Baeksang Arts Awards | Best New Actor | Do Ji-han | Nominated |
| 2013 | Mnet 20's Choice Awards | 20's Booming Star, Male | Do Ji-han | Nominated |
| 2013 | 22nd Buil Film Awards | Best Cinematography | Kim Young-ho | Nominated |
| 2013 | 50th Grand Bell Awards | Technical Award (visual effects) | Digital Idea | Won |
