= Hye-jeong =

- Hangul: 혜정
- RR: Hyejeong
- MR: Hyejŏng

Hye-jeong or Hye-jung is a Korean given name.

People with this name include:

- Jo Hea-jung (born 1953), South Korean volleyball player
- Kwag Hye-jeong (born 1975), South Korean handball player
- Park Sol-mi (born Park Hye-jung, 1978), South Korean actress
- Hwangbo (born Hwangbo Hye-jeong, 1980), South Korean rapper and singer
- Kang Hye-jung (born 1982), South Korean actress
- Shin Hye-jeong (field hockey) (born 1992), South Korean field hockey player
- Shin Hye-jeong (born 1993), South Korean actress and idol singer, member of girl group AOA
- Kim Hye-jeong (born 1998), South Korean badminton player

== See also ==
- List of Korean given names
