= Just Friends? (2009 film) =

- Theatrical poster
- Directed by: Kim Jho Kwang-soo
- Written by: Kim Jho Kwang-soo; Min Yong-geun
- Produced by: Han Sang-beom
- Starring: Yeon Woo-jin; Lee Je-hoon
- Cinematography: Kim Myeong-joon
- Edited by: Nam Na-yeong
- Music by: Kim Dong-wook
- Production companies: Generation Blue Films; Korean Gay Men's Human Rights Group Chingusai
- Distributed by: Generation Blue Films
- Release dates: October 10, 2009 (Pusan); December 17, 2009 (South Korea)
- Running time: 30 minutes
- Country: South Korea
- Language: Korean

Just Friends? (Korean: 친구사이?; RR: Chingusai?) is a 2009 South Korean short film directed and written by Kim Jho Kwang-soo. It is the second installment in a series of gay-themed short films directed by Kim, following the 2008 film Boy Meets Boy. The film stars Yeon Woo-jin and Lee Je-hoon, who together play a couple that must deal with the issue of coming out.

It premiered at the 14th Pusan International Film Festival on October 10, 2009. Two months later on December 17, Just Friends? was theatrically released in South Korea.

A follow-up to Just Friends?, titled LOVE, 100°C, was released in 2010.

== Plot ==
The film begins with a trot performance by various characters during the opening credits. Seok-i (Lee Je-hoon) anxiously awaits the arrival of his boyfriend Min-soo (Yeon Woo-jin), who has taken leave from the military. Shortly after they reunite, they are met by Min-soo's mother (Lee Seon-joo), who is unaware of their relationship. Seok-i decides to stay with Min-soo and his mother at an inn when he realizes there is no way for him to get back home.

The next day, after Min-soo's mother leaves for church, the couple become physically intimate back in their room. Their session is cut short, however, when Min-soo's mother returns unexpectedly early and becomes devastated by the revelation. Seok-i returns home that night. Then there is a short confession song by Min-soo for his mother, telling her that he is gay and that he will continue to love Seok-i.

Sometime after the event, Seok-i is shown working at a restaurant when he is encountered by Min-soo, who is on leave again. As the two run outside, a voice-over of Min-soo's telephone conversation with his mother plays—Min-soo tells her that he will return home together with Seok-i. Meanwhile, as the voice-over ends, the couple kisses in public.

The ending credits features the trot theme again by four performers in drag. Afterward, there is a brief clip of Min-soo and Seok-i at the same visiting center as in the beginning of the film. As Seok-i gets ready to begin his military service, his mother is heard calling him—the two lovers look at each other in dismay as they realize another cycle of coming out.

== Cast ==
- Yeon Woo-jin as Min-soo: Yeon is sometimes credited under his former stage name, Seo Ji-hoo.
- Lee Je-hoon as Seok-i: Although his name is I-seok, he is referred to most people as Seok-i.
- Lee Seon-joo as Min-soo's mother: As a Christian, she turns to church when she finds out that her son is gay.
- Lee Chae-eun as Chae-eun: Chae-eun is a stranger who accompanies Seok-i during their trips to and from the soldier visiting center to meet her boyfriend. Later in the film, she finds out that her boyfriend is gay, which causes her emotional distress.
- Moon Seong-kwon as Sergeant: Chae-eun's boyfriend, he tells her that he is gay. Seok-i says to Chae-eun that he could tell from the beginning.
- Son Cheol-min as Visiting Center Soldier: He refuses to let Seok-i get a new visitor form when Seok-i accidentally indicates on the original that he is Min-soo's partner.
- Go Soo-hee as Restaurant Owner: Seok-i's employer, she allows Seok-i to take a break from work to go out with Min-soo.
- Im Ji-hyeon as Bus Soldier 1
- Ojeki Sinya as Bus Soldier 2
- Lee Chun-hyeong as Ticket Office Worker: She informs Seok-i that there is no transportation available to take him home, forcing him to stay with Min-soo and his mother that night.

== Production ==
=== Origins ===
Director and screenwriter Kim Jho Kwang-soo stating that he wanted to create a "real gay film of 99.9% purity", after his observation that many Korean films of the past contained misleading portrayals of homosexuals. He based the film's story on his own personal experiences as a gay man. Kim also stated that after completing his 2009 short, Boy Meets Boy, which focuses on a first-time romantic encounter, he wanted to create a successor involving more mature themes. Just Friends? was produced in collaboration with Korean gay rights organization, Chingusai, which shares the same name as the film's Korean title.

=== Casting ===
Actor Hong Jong-hyun was originally cast alongside Yeon Woo-jin for the lead roles, though Lee Je-hoon took his place sometime after. Both Hong and Lee would later be cast in Kim Jho Kwang-soo's 2010 horror film, Ghost. Yeon's role as Min-soo was his debut in a major work.

=== Filming ===
Principal photography began on May 21, 2009.

== Release ==
Just Friends? had its world premiere at the 14th Pusan International Film Festival on October 10, 2009. Also prior to its theatrical release, it screened at the 35th Seoul Independent Film Festival on December 11 of that year. Just Friends? was theatrically released on December 17, 2009. In the following year, the work had screenings at film festivals in other regions, including Italy, the United States, Japan, and Hong Kong.

=== Rating controversy ===
Prior to the release of Just Friends?, the Korea Media Rating Board rated the film's trailer as being "harmful to youth". Furthermore, in November 2009, the ratings organization gave the film itself a "teenager restricted" (19+) rating, citing "sexual situations" and "risk of imitation". This decision drew criticism from figures such as New Progressive Party spokesman Kim Jong-cheol, who argued that the KMRB was reviewing homosexual-themed films on a different criteria than for heterosexual-themed films. In September 2010, the film's producers, Generation Blue Films and Chingusai, filed an administrative litigation lawsuit against the KMRB, requesting the Seoul Administrative Court to cancel the film's classification. The court ruled in favor of the plaintiff on September 9, stating that the film "provides understanding of and education about minorities". On October 6, at a following inspection of the KMRB administration, a representative to congressman Jin Hyung-jo criticized Just Friends?, claiming that the film contained scenes that would provoke sexual curiosity in youth.
