= Si-won (name) =

- Hangul: 시원
- RR: Siwon
- MR: Siwŏn
- IPA: [ɕiwʌn]

Si-won, also spelled Shi-won, is a Korean given name.

== People ==
People with this name include:

- Ryu Si-won (born 1972), South Korean actor and singer
- Choi Si-won (born 1986), South Korean actor and singer, member of boy band Super Junior
- Lee Si-won (born 1987), South Korean actress

== Fictional characters ==
Fictional characters with this name include:

- Sung Shi-won, female character in 2012 South Korean television series Reply 1997
- Park Shi-won, female character in 2017 South Korean film The Discloser
- Park Shi-won, male character in 2018 South Korean television series A Poem a Day
- Park Si-won, female character in 2019 South Korean television series Spring Turns to Spring
- Lee Shi-won, female character in 2019 South Korean television series Failing in Love

== See also ==
- List of Korean given names
