= Our School =

Our School may refer to:

- Our School (film)
- Our School (TV series)
