= Golden Apple (TV series) =

2005–2006 South Korean television series

- Promotional poster
- Genre: Romance, Drama
- Written by: Kwon Ki-young
- Directed by: Shin Chang-seok; Park Kyung-ri; Lee Geon-joon
- Starring: Park Sol-mi; Kim Ji-hoon; Ji Hyun-woo; Go Eun-ah; Jung Chan
- Country of origin: South Korea
- Original language: Korean
- No. of episodes: 30

Production
- Executive producer: Park Soo-dong
- Production location: Korea
- Running time: Wednesdays and Thursdays at 21:55 (KST)
- Production company: JS Pictures

Original release
- Network: Korean Broadcasting System
- Release: 16 November 2005 – 23 February 2006

Golden Apple (Korean: 황금사과; RR: Hwanggeumsagwa) is a South Korean television series starring Park Sol-mi, Kim Ji-hoon, Ji Hyun-woo, Go Eun-ah and Jung Chan. It aired on KBS2 from November 16, 2005 to February 23, 2006 on Wednesdays and Thursdays at 21:55 for 30 episodes. The story is about four siblings living in a village in the 1960s, and a woman fighting to clear her dead father's name after he is wrongly accused of her stepmother's murder.

Golden Apple received average viewership ratings of 17.43%, making it the 13th highest-rated Korean drama in 2006.

== Plot ==
Kim Chun-dong (Choi Il-hwa) is a widowed farmer with one daughter, Kyung-sook (Lee Young-ah), and two sons, Kyung-gu (Kim Myung-jae) and Kyung-min (Park Ji-bin). Kyung-sook is committed to maintaining the household after the passing of their mother, and the villagers praise her sweet, cheerful nature and hardworking attitude. Everyday chores leave her little time for fun, but she does shed her tough exterior for Park Jong-gyu, the farm owner's son. A student at Seoul National University, Jong-gyu visits on occasion to the delight of Kyung-sook.

Her father Chun-dong marries again, and the woman (Bang Eun-hee) has a six-year-daughter, Keum-shil (Yoo Yeon-mi). The new siblings live a humble but happy life in the countryside. But the marriage is not a happy one, and Keum-shil's mother continues her affair with Park Byung-sam (Lee Deok-hwa) a rich landlord in the village who is running for a seat in the Parliament. After the election, her body is discovered floating in the river, and Chun-dong is wrongly accused of being the killer. He confesses after being tortured by the police, and later dies in custody before the trial. Park Byung-sam, who is in fact Keum-shil's real father, orders his brother-in-law Jung (Lee Ki-young) to adopt Keum-shil, then gives him a job at the Intelligence Office in Seoul.

Years later, Kyung-sook (Park Sol-mi) has also moved to Seoul and is working hard to raise her brothers (Kim Ji-hoon, Ji Hyun-woo). She vows that she will clear her father's name and find the real killer. Park Byung-sam remains her number one suspect, even though she is in love with his son, Jong-gyu (Jung Chan).

== Cast ==
=== Kim family ===
- Park Sol-mi as Kyung-sook
  - Lee Young-ah as young Kyung-sook
- Kim Ji-hoon as Kyung-gu
  - Kim Myung-jae as young Kyung-gu
- Ji Hyun-woo as Kyung-min
  - Park Ji-bin as young Kyung-min
- Go Eun-ah as Keum-shil
  - Yoo Yeon-mi as young Keum-shil
- Choi Il-hwa as Kim Chun-dong
- Bang Eun-hee as stepmother, Keum-shil's mother
- Lee Joo-shil as Kyung-sook's paternal grandmother

=== Park family ===
- Jung Chan as Park Jong-gyu
- Lee Deok-hwa as Park Byung-sam
- Lee Mi-ji as Ms. Jung, Byung-sam's wife

=== Jung family ===
- Lee In-hye as Jung Hong-yeon
  - Park Da-young as young Hong-yeon
- Lee Ki-young as Chief Jung
- Lee Jong-nam as Ms. Im, Jung's wife

=== Jo family ===
- Jo Mi-ryung as Jo Mi-ja
- Kim Soo-yong as Jo Bong-joo
- Hwang Beom-shik as Jo Hong-man
- Kim Dong-joo as Ja-shil, Hong-man's wife

=== Hwang family ===
- Moon Won-joo as Hwang Soon-shik
  - Yoon Seok-hyun as young Soon-shik
- Jung Seung-ho as Hwang Chang-han
- Baek Seung-hyeon as Hwang Sang-taek

=== Extended cast ===
- Yoon Hye-kyung as Choi Seong-hee
- Noh Hyun-hee as Oh Mi-ja
- Kim Hae-in as Joo Jung-eun
- Im Yae-won as Han Hee-young
- Kim Byung-ki as CEO Han
- Won Jong-rye as Hee-young's mother
- Jung Heung-chae as Mr. Lee, Byung-sam's campaign manager
- Lee Woo-seok as Mr. Hong, Byung-sam's chauffeur
- Go In-beom as Detective Shin
- Kim Soo-hong as Bong-gu
- Kim Ha-kyun as co-president Kim
- Ham Sung-min as Child
- Lee Won-hee as Doctor Kang
- Yeo Woon-kay

== Awards ==
2005 KBS Drama Awards

- Best Young Actress - Yoo Yeon-mi
- Best Young Actor - Park Ji-bin

2006 Baeksang Arts Awards

- Best New Actress (TV) - Lee Young-ah
