= Kim Ji-hoon (director) =

South Korean filmmaker (born 1971)

- Born: 1971 (age 54–55); Daegu, South Korea
- Occupation: Film director

Korean name
- Hangul: 김지훈
- RR: Gim Jihun
- MR: Kim Chihun

Kim Ji-hoon (Korean: 김지훈; born 1971), also spelled Kim Ji-hun, is a South Korean film director.

== Life and career ==
Kim Ji-hoon was born in Daegu. After graduating from Hanyang University's Theater and Film Art Department, he worked as an assistant director on a number of films. He made his feature directorial debut in 2004 with the film Mokpo, Gangster's Paradise, starring Cha In-pyo and Cho Jae-hyun. His 2007 film May 18, about the Gwangju Massacre of 1980 and which starred Kim Sang-kyung, Lee Yo-won and Lee Joon-gi, earned him the Best Director award at the 2008 Korea Movie Star Awards. He went on to direct Sector 7, a 2011 action/horror film about a sea monster which attacked oil platforms, with an ensemble cast led by Ha Ji-won and Ahn Sung-ki. Distributor CJ E&M Pictures stated that Sector 7 was the highest-grossing South Korean film in China, but it was not well received by South Korean audiences, nor by critics, who panned its "flat" main characters and low-quality computer-generated imagery.

Kim's next work after that was The Tower, a disaster film about a fire in a high-rise apartment building, starring Sul Kyung-gu, Kim Sang-kyung and Son Ye-jin. In response to the criticisms of Sector 7, Kim spent nearly two years working with the post-production team on CGI; the film was finally released in December 2012. Kim stated that he got the idea for The Tower from a variety of boyhood experiences, including his first visit to Seoul where he saw the 63 Building and wondered what it would be like to get trapped inside, and a later incident where he got stuck in an elevator, which he described as "the moment when I first felt dread".

His most recent work, of I Want to Know Your Parents, was postponed indefinitely following the sexual assault scandal of actor Oh Dal-su. It was eventually released in 2022.

== Filmography ==
- The Aquarium (short film, 1996) - director
- Egoism (short film, 1996) - director
- Greenhouse (short film, 1997) - director, screenplay, editor, sound
- Whispering Corridors (1998) - assistant director
- Full Moon Full Sun (short film, 1999) - actor
- Rush (1999) - assistant director
- The Secret (2000) - assistant director
- Mokpo, Gangster's Paradise (2004) - director, screenplay
- May 18 (2007) - director
- Sector 7 (2011) - director, screenplay
- The Tower (2012) - director, script editor
- Sinkhole (2021) - director
- I Want to Know Your Parents (2022) - director
