= Lee Hyun-jin (actor) =

South Korean actor (born 1985)

- Born: March 5, 1985 (age 41); Daegu, South Korea
- Education: ChungAng University - Industrial Economics (leave of absence)
- Occupation: Actor
- Years active: 2007–present

Korean name
- Hangul: 이현진
- Hanja: 李現瞋
- RR: I Hyeonjin
- MR: I Hyŏnjin

Lee Hyun-jin (born March 5, 1985) is a South Korean actor. He is best known for his roles in the films Boy Meets Boy, Chubby Revolution, and the television series' Heartstrings, Operation Proposal, and Sky Castle.

He made his stage debut in Audacious Romance after being encouraged by Kim Soo-ro.

== Filmography ==
=== Television series ===
Year	Title	Role
2007	Kimchi Cheese Smile	Uhm Hyun-jin
2008	Family's Honor	Jung Hyun-kyu
2009	Assorted Gems	Gung San-ho
2010	Happiness in the Wind	Jang Min-guk
2011	Heartstrings	Hyun Ki-young
2012	Operation Proposal	Kwon Jin-won
2013	Empire of Gold	Choi Seong-jae
2013	The Heirs	Bo-na's brother Lee Hyun-jin (cameo, episode 19)
2016	Another Miss Oh	Hae-young (soil)'s opponent (cameo)]
2016	The Second Last Love	Jang Eun-ho
2017	Whisper	Park Hyun-soo
2018	Sky Castle	Teacher Jo
2020	Dinner Mate	Kang Gun-woo
2022	Gold Mask	Kang Dong-ha

=== Film ===
Year	Title	Role
2008	Boy Meets Boy (short film)	Seok-i
2011	Mr. Idol	Kim Ji-hoon
2011	Spellbound	Ki-woo
2012	Chubby Revolution	Kang Do-kyung
TBA	Things You Don't Know	

=== Web series ===
Year	Title	Platform	Role	Ref.
2021	Work Later, Drink Now	Ji-yong		

=== Music video appearances ===
Year	Song(s) Title	Artist
2008	"To Follow My Heart" + "I Believe in"	TGUS
2009	"Yet" + "Feel Like Exploding" + "At the End of Love"	Zia
2010	"Firefly"	J-Hwan
2011	"Hello" + "I Told You I Wanna Die"	Huh Gak

== Theater ==
Year	Title	Role	Reprised
2012-2013	Audacious Romance	Gu Bong-pil	2013-2014

== Awards and nominations ==
Name of the award ceremony, year presented, category, nominee of the award, and the result of the nomination
Award ceremony	Year	Category	Nominee / Work	Result	Ref.
KBS Drama Awards	2022	Excellence Award, Actor in a Daily Drama	Gold Mask	Nominated	
