= On the Occasion of Remembering the Turning Gate =

2002 film by Hong Sang-soo

- Theatrical poster
- Hangul: 생활의 발견
- Hanja: 生活의 發見
- RR: Saenghwarui balgyeon
- MR: Saenghwarŭi palgyŏn
- Directed by: Hong Sang-soo
- Written by: Hong Sang-soo
- Starring: Kim Sang-kyung; Chu Sang-mi; Ye Ji-won
- Release date: March 22, 2002
- Running time: 115 minutes
- Country: South Korea
- Language: Korean
- Box office: $883,312

On the Occasion of Remembering the Turning Gate, is the fourth film by South Korean director Hong Sang-soo.

== Plot ==
In the dreary and rigid city of Seoul, Gyung-soo is an actor who's fairly well known on stage. He has trusted a director he knows well and acted in his movie, but it flops. He insists on receiving his actor's fee, but all he gets is a mere grand's worth. He also misses out on his chance to act in director's next movie. The future looks cloudy for him.

Gyung-soo goes down to Chuncheon to meet an old friend who's a writer, Seong-wu. They go out to the town and Gyung-soo's friend introduces him to a pretty dancer named Myung-sook. After having a drink with Gyung-soo and his friend, she suddenly hits on Gyung-soo and on the spur of the moment they hit it off and go to a motel. But Gyung-soo doesn't know that Seong-wu has long had feelings for Myung-soo, even though he has never revealed his true feelings for her. Gyung-soo's relationship with his friend turns sour as Myung-sook becomes obsessively infatuated with Gyung-soo.

Gyung-soo tries to put his bad memories of Chuncheon behind him and gets on a train headed for Gyeongju. Sitting next to him on the train is a woman named Sun-young who entices him after recognizing his face. After she gets off the train, he chases after Sun-young and stops her, but she gives him mixed signals. Gyung-soo follows Sun-young to her house and on the next day he works up enough courage to knock on her door. This time Gyung-soo falls in love.

== Reception ==
Turning Gate has a 100% approval rating on Rotten Tomatoes.

== See also ==
- List of Korean-language films
