= Hokkaido Korean Primary, Middle and High School =

North Korea-affiliated school in Japan

- 北海道朝鮮初中高級学校 혹가이도조선초중고급학교

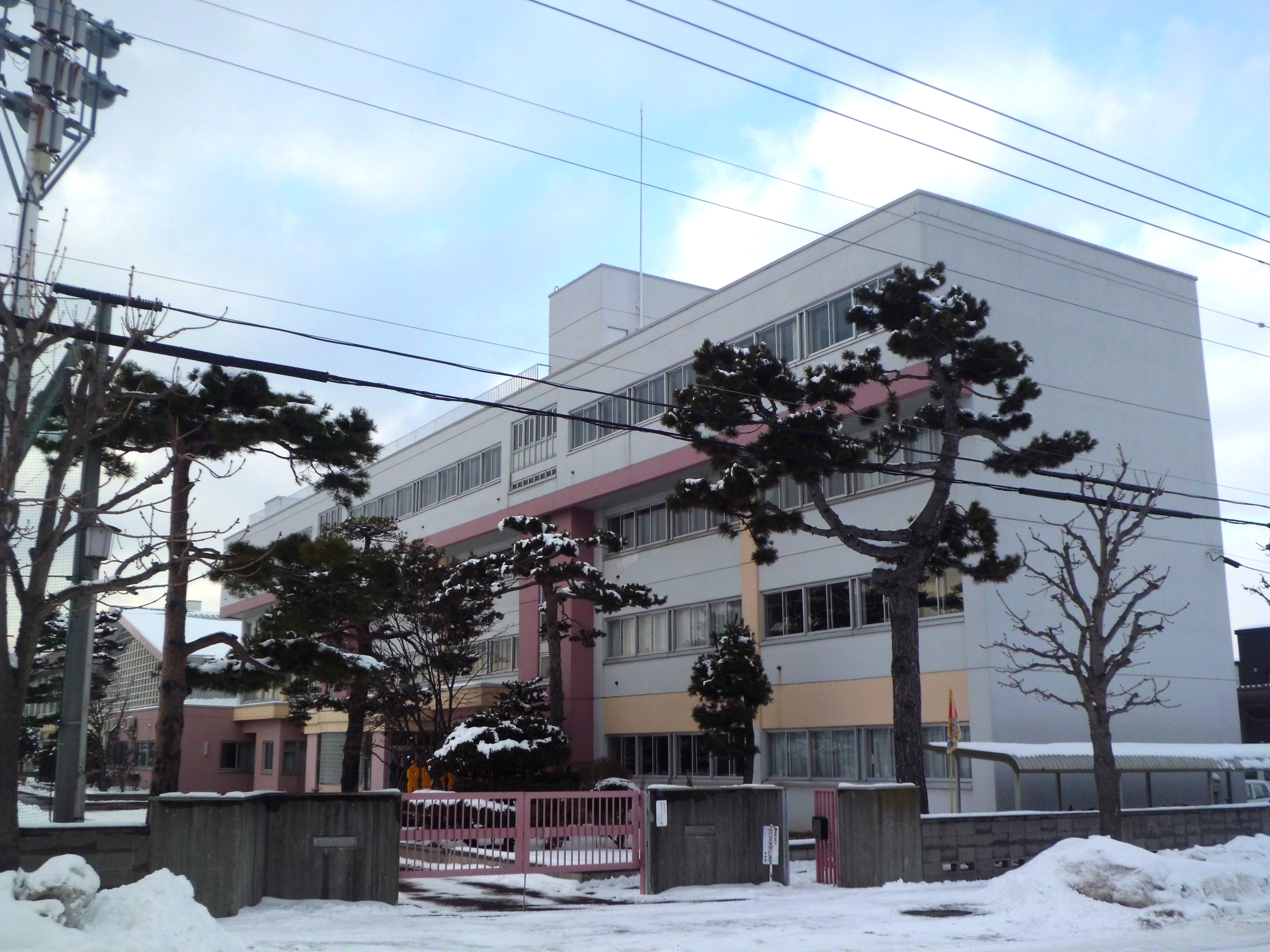
- The school in Sapporo in 2014

Location
- 2-6-1 Hiraoka 4-jō, Kiyota-ku; Sapporo, Hokkaido, 004-0874; Japan; 43.0054°N 141.4519°E

Information
- Other name: Hokkaido Corean School
- Type: Private Korean school
- Established: 1961; 65 years ago
- Authority: Hokkaido Korean Educational Foundation
- Grades: Primary and middle school on campus; senior-high students study in Ibaraki
- Website: hokkaido-urihakkyo.com

Hokkaido Korean Primary, Middle and High School (北海道朝鮮初中高級学校, Hokkaidō Chōsen Shochūkōkyūgakkō; Korean: 혹가이도 조선초중고급학교) or the Hokkaido Corean School is a North Korean elementary, junior high, and senior high school in Kiyota-ku, Sapporo, Hokkaido, Japan.

== Notable students ==
- Jake Lee, Zainichi Korean pro-wrestler (Real Name: Lee Che-Gyong, Korean: 이 체경 - All Japan Pro-Wrestling)

== See also ==
- Our School (film)
