= Kiyota-ku =

Coordinates: 42°59′58″N 141°26′38″E

Kiyota 清田区
- Ward
- Kiyota Ward
- Flag Seal

- Location of Kiyota-ku in Sapporo
- Country: Japan
- Prefecture: Hokkaidō
- City: Sapporo
- Established: November 4, 1997

Area
  - Total: 59.87 km^{2} (23.12 sq mi)

Population (2014)
  - Total: 115,351
  - Density: 1,927/km^{2} (4,990/sq mi)
- Estimation as of December 31, 2014
- Time zone: UTC+9 (Japan Standard Time)
- Postal: 004-8613
- Address: 1-2-1 Hiraokaichijo, Kiyota-ku, Sapporo-shi, Hokkaido
- Website: Kiyota-ku Ward Office

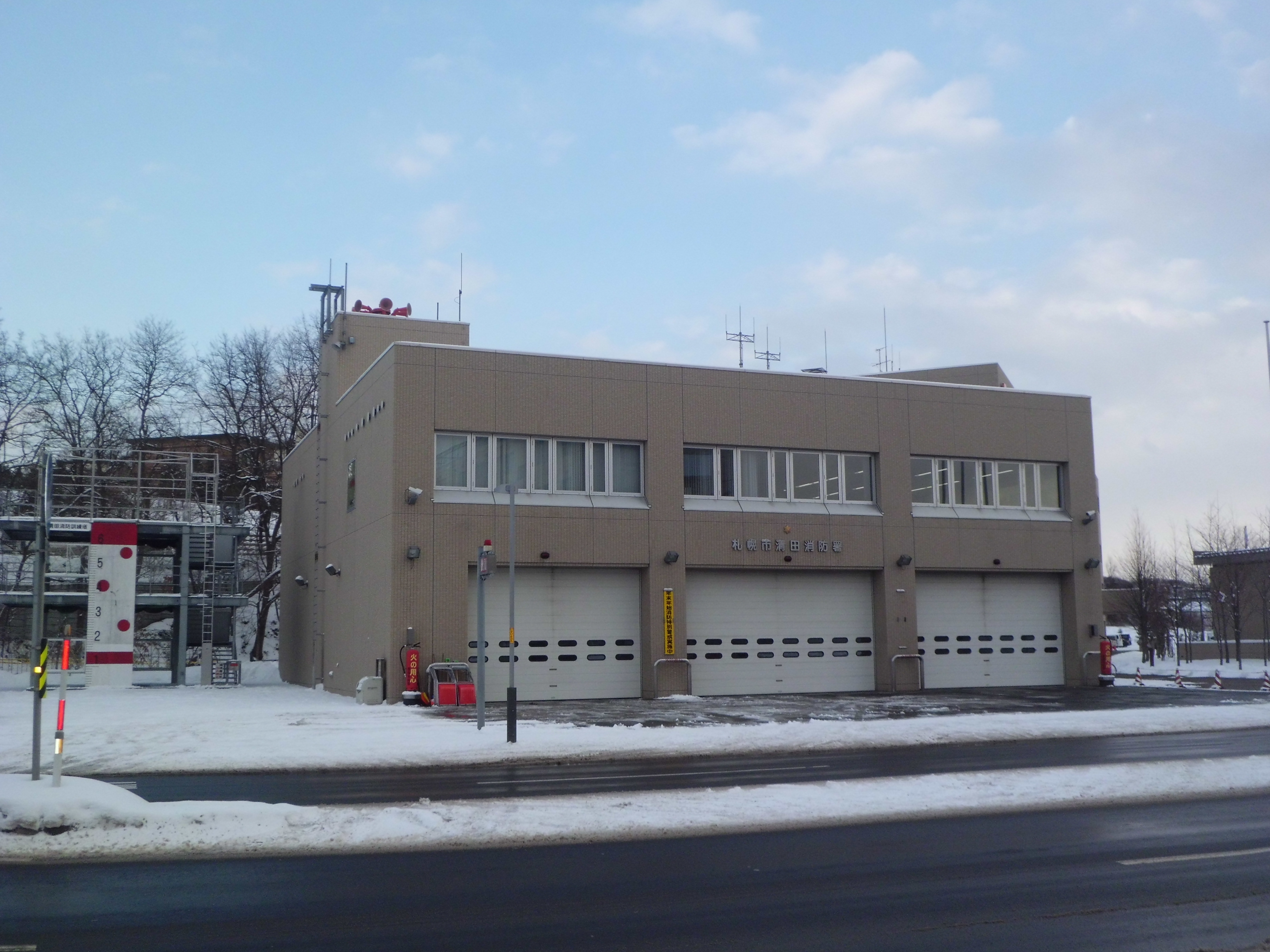
Fire station

Kiyota-ku, Sapporo (清田区、札幌) is one of the 10 wards in Sapporo, Hokkaidō, Japan. It is translated as "pure" or "clean" for "清", and "(rice) field" for "田". The ward was split from Toyohira-ku on November 4, 1997.

== Overview ==
According to the jūminhyō (registry of residential addresses and figures) in 2008, 114,730 people are living in Kiyota-ku. The total area of the ward is 59.70 km^{2}, which is the 4th largest ward in Sapporo.

The ward is neighboured to four wards in Sapporo (Toyohira-ku, Shiroishi-ku, Atsubetsu-ku, Minami-ku), and two cities (Kitahiroshima, Eniwa) .

== History ==
The central part of Kiyota-ku was originally called as "Ashiribetsu", and in 1944, it was renamed as Kiyota, meaning "beautiful pure (clean) rice field". Rice fields and farms of the apples have widely spread in the area until early Shōwa period, but the area did not exist as one of the wards in Sapporo.

In 1972, Sapporo was listed as one of the cities designated by government ordinance, and several wards were established including Toyohira-ku. On November 4, 1997, Kiyota-ku was split from Toyohira-ku, and the Kiyota-ku Residential Center with a hall for cultural purposes was built in following year.

== Education ==
=== University ===
- Sapporo International University

=== College ===
- Sapporo International University Junior College

=== High schools ===
==== Public ====
- Hokkaido Sapporo Shinei High School
- Hokkaido Sapporo Hiraoka High School
- Hokkaido Sapporo Kiyota High School (city)

==== Private ====
- Hokurei High School
- Hokkaido Korean Primary, Middle and High School (North Korean international school)

== Transportation ==
Kiyota-ku is the only ward of Sapporo in which there is no railway.

- Hokkaido Expressway: Sapporo-minami IC
- Route 36

== Mascot ==
Kiyochi, the ward's mascot

Kiyota's mascot is Kiyochi (きよっち) is a kind yet mischievous festival-going and nature-loving yōsei that resides in Mount Shirahata. The hat was actually the ward symbol. The leaf on his shirt symbolizes nature (this gives him the ability to turn into a leaf himself to give positive energy to people he trusted and take away the bad ones while protecting them from danger. He loves to eat spinach served with sweets and water. His birthday is November 4. His role model is Shigeharu Nagaoka (who revolutionize rice farming in the area) inspired him to grow rice and other stuff that can develop the ward.
