= Do Ji-han =

South Korean actor

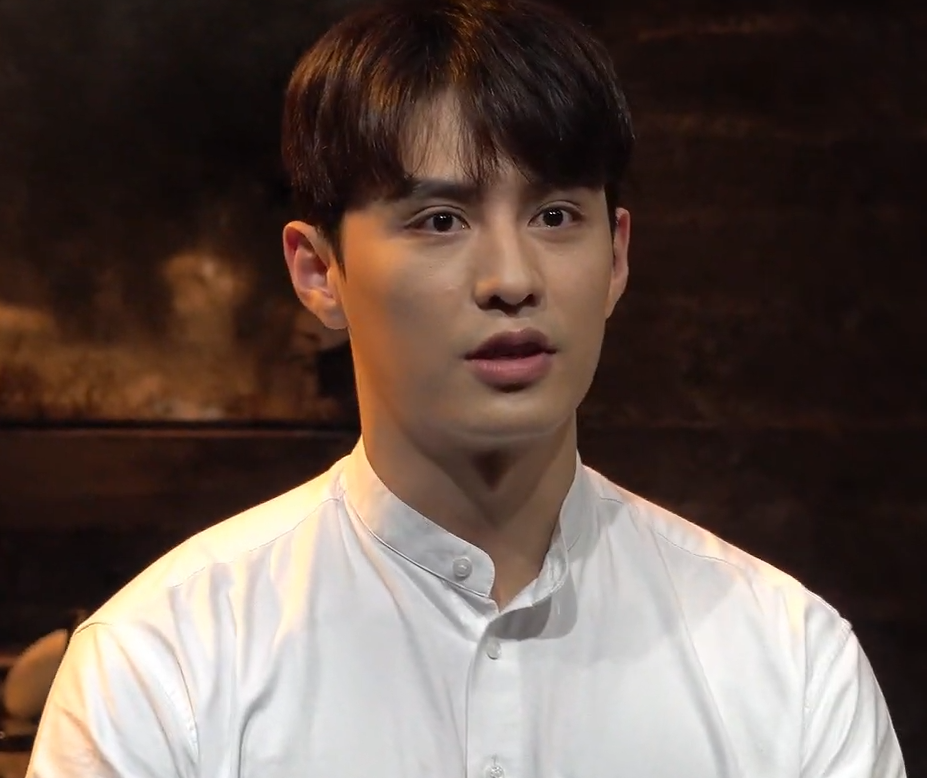
- Do in 2021
- Born: September 24, 1991 (age 35); Daejeon, South Korea
- Occupation: Actor
- Years active: 2009–present
- Agent: Y1 Entertainment

Korean name
- Hangul: 도지한
- Hanja: 都枝寒
- RR: Do Jihan
- MR: To Chihan

Do Ji-han (born September 24, 1991) is a South Korean actor. He is best known for his supporting roles in the film The Tower (2012), which earned him a Baeksang Arts Award nomination for Best New Actor, and on the KBS2's television series Hwarang: The Poet Warrior Youth (2016–2017). He enlisted in the military on December 26, 2018.

== Personal life ==
Do quietly enlisted for his mandatory military service as an active duty soldier on December 24, 2018. He first underwent five weeks of basic training at the Army's 12th Infantry Division in Gangwon Province.

== Filmography ==
=== Film ===
Year	Title	Role	Notes	Ref.
2011	My Way	Kim Joon-sik (teen)		
2012	The Neighbor	Ahn Sang-yoon		
2012	The Tower	Lee Sun-woo		
2015	The Beauty Inside	Woo-jin		
2016	Musudan	Choi Chul		
2023	Ma'am Chief: Shakedown in Seoul		Cameo	

=== Television series ===
Year	Title	Role	Notes	Ref.
2009	The Queen Returns	Na Bong-hee (young)		
2009	Will It Snow for Christmas?	Park Jong-suk		
2010	The Great Merchant	Jung Hong-soo (young)		
2011	Real School	Do Ji-han		
2012	Can't Live Without You	Kim Chi-do		
2013	Incarnation of Money	Kwon Hyuk		
2013	Basketball	Kang San		
2015	Great Stories	Oh Chan-young		
2016	Hwarang: The Poet Warrior Youth	Park Ban-ryu		
2017	Lovers in Bloom	Cha Tae-jin		
2018	100 Days My Prince	Dong-joo	Special appearance	

=== Web series ===
Year	Title	Role	Ref.
2014	Miss Hyena	Jung Chan-yong	

=== Music video appearances ===
Year	Song title	Artist
2011	"Piano Forest"	Bubble Sisters
2013	"1440"	Huh Gak

== Awards and nominations ==
Name of the award ceremony, year presented, category, nominee of the award, and the result of the nomination
Award ceremony	Year	Category	Nominee / Work	Result	Ref.
Baeksang Arts Awards	2013	Best New Actor – Film	The Tower	Nominated	
Mnet 20's Choice Awards	2013	20's Booming Star – Male	Incarnation of Money & The Tower	Nominated	
