= Mapado 2: Back to the Island =

- Theatrical poster
- Hangul: 마파도 2
- RR: Mapado 2
- MR: Map'ado 2
- Directed by: Lee Sang-hoon
- Written by: Samuel
- Produced by: Baek Jong-jin; Lee Se-yeol
- Starring: Lee Moon-sik; Kim Ji-young; Yeo Woon-kay; Kim Eul-dong; Kim Hyeong-ja; Kil Hae-yeon
- Cinematography: Jang Seong-baek
- Edited by: Moon In-dae
- Music by: Kim Chang-hwan
- Distributed by: CJ Entertainment
- Release date: January 18, 2007
- Running time: 111 minutes
- Country: South Korea
- Language: Korean
- Box office: US$8,730,037

Mapado 2: Back to the Island (Korean: 마파도 2) is a 2007 South Korean film and sequel to the 2005 comedy Mapado.

== Plot ==
Former detective Chung-su takes a secret mission from an aged millionaire who wants to see his first love again before he dies. Knowing only that the woman's name is Kkotnim and that she now lives on Dongbaek Island, Chung-su sets sail only for a shipwreck to leave him stranded once more on Mapado, where five abusive old women gave him trouble two years earlier. Discovering that the former name of Mapado is in fact Dongbaek, he starts to investigate the women's pasts believing that one of them is Kkotnim.

== Cast ==
- Lee Moon-sik - Chung-su
- Kim Ji-young
- Yeo Woon-kay
- Kim Eul-dong
- Kim Hyeong-ja
- Gil Hae-yeon
- Lee Kyu-han
- Lee Cheol-min
- Nam Ji-hyun
- Kim Soo-mi (cameo)
- Joo Hyun (cameo)

== Production ==
Mapado 2 was filmed in Yeonggwang and Suncheon, South Jeolla Province.

== Release ==
Mapado 2 was released in South Korea on 18 January 2007, and topped the box office on its opening weekend with 508,590 admissions. The film went on to receive a total of 1,560,297 admissions, with a gross (as of 25 February 2007) of $8,730,037.

In June 2007, Mapado 2 was screened in the Panorama section of the Shanghai International Film Festival.

== Reception ==
Kim Tae-jong of The Korea Times stated that, "Overall, the film may not have the cutting-edge humor or well-developed story of the original, but its old fashioned jokes still work. The cast knows how to produce laughter with the minimum of ingredients."
