= I Want to Know Your Parents =

2022 South Korean film by Kim Ji-hoon

- Theatrical release poster
- Hangul: 니 부모 얼굴이 보고 싶다
- Lit.: I Want to See Your Parents' Faces
- RR: Ni bumo eolguri bogo sipda
- MR: Ni pumo ŏlguri pogo sipta
- Directed by: Kim Ji-hoon
- Screenplay by: Gim Gyung-mi
- Based on: Japanese theatrical play Oya no Kao ga Mitai by Seigo Hatasawa
- Produced by: Jin Il-kyu
- Starring: Sul Kyung-gu; Chun Woo-hee; Moon So-ri; Oh Dal-su; Ko Chang-seok
- Cinematography: Lee Chang-jae
- Edited by: Shin Min-kyung
- Music by: Kim Tae-seong
- Production companies: The Tower Pictures; Fox International Productions Korea; River Pictures
- Distributed by: Mindmark
- Release date: April 27, 2022
- Running time: 111 minutes
- Country: South Korea
- Language: Korean
- Box office: US$3.1 million

I Want to Know Your Parents (Korean: 니 부모 얼굴이 보고 싶다; RR: ni bumo eolguri bogo sipda; lit. 'I Want to See Your Parents' Faces') is a 2022 South Korean mystery thriller film directed by Kim Ji-hoon and written by Gim Gyung-mi. Based on a Japanese theatrical play Oya no Kao ga Mitai by Seigo Hatasawa, the film stars Sul Kyung-gu, Chun Woo-hee, Moon So-ri, Oh Dal-su and Ko Chang-seok. It was released theatrically on April 27, 2022.

== Plot ==
Lawyer Kang Ho-chang receives a call to from his son's teacher Song Jeong-wook to come to Haneum International School, where he meets four other parents: math teacher Jung, retired police officer Park Mu-Taek and his wife, and doctor Do Ji-yeol. The school's principal informs them that one of the students, Kim Gon-woo, was rescued from drowning in a lake. Jeong-wook reveals that the boy, now in a comatose state, had previously sent her a letter claiming that he was being bullied by sons of the four parents, including Kang Han-gyeol, Ho-chang's son. The principal, worried for his school's reputation, tries to contain the situation and hides the letter in his office, while the four parents instructs their children to keep quiet. Ho-chang, curious to find the truth, investigates Gon-woo's room and finds Do Ji-yeol also inspecting there. Together, they steal Gon-woo's phone to have it hacked and look for its contents. To their surprise, the phone contains footage of Gon-woo being bullied by the four boys. The parents reconvened and decide to mitigate: Teacher Jung tries to convince the principal to give them the letter, Mu-Taek instructs his previous police precinct to turn a blind eye, Ho-chang hides the phone, while Ji-yeol transfers Gon-woo to his hospital and keep an eye on him. Ho-chang receives a text message on Gon-woo's phone from Nam Ji-Ho, a concerned neighbor who witnessed the bullying incident. He and Ji-yeol meet and bribe Ji-Ho for her silence.

Gon-woo succumbs to his injuries despite Ji-yeol trying to resuscitate him. At his funeral, Jeong-wook reveals to Gon-woo's mother about receiving the letter. Gon-woo's mother reports the incident to the police, only to be turned away. Ho-chang confronts Han-gyeol, who was Gon-woo's roommate and best friend, about the bullying. Han-gyeol denies about it and claims the three other students did it. Jeong-wook later finds out about Han-gyeol's falling out with Gon-woo and decides to confront him herself, only to be stopped by Ho-chang. Jeong-wook indignantly tells Ho-chang that he's "worse than the children" and that he should be ashamed. Witnessing the injustice to Gon-woo and his mother, Jeong-wook whistleblows the incident by publishing a video of herself on the internet, detailing the letter. Word quickly spreads around about the bullying which led to another precinct picking up the case. The four boys are summoned for questioning, but only Han-gyeol is arrested.

Ho-chang represents his son in court and searches for clues that can have his son vindicated. He learns from a store owner near the lake that Han-gyeol had been coerced by the other students to beat Gon-woo but also finds out that he's discreetly mending the latter's injuries. During the trial, Ji-Ho is revealed as a witness and accuses Han-gyeol as the sole perpetuator. This claim was refuted by Ho-chang, who had previously met with Ji-Ho and covertly recorded their conversation detailing another bribery by Ji-yeol. The three boys are ultimately arrested while Han-gyeol is acquitted as another coerced victim and released. Ho-chang is confronted by a defeated Ji-yeol, while Jeong-wook asks him if he feels guilty about it. Ho-chang returns to the lake and discovers from another witness and a drone footage that his son was the one who actually killed Gon-woo. Shocked and distraught, he throws the drone into the lake and wonders if he's more corrupted than his son.

== Cast ==
- Sul Kyung-gu as Kang Ho-chang, a lawyer and the father of Kang Han-gyeol, a student at a prestigious Haneum International Middle School.
- Chun Woo-hee as Song Jeong-wook, a homeroom teacher.
- Moon So-ri as victim's mother
- Oh Dal-su as Do Ji-yeol
- Ko Chang-seok as Teacher Jung
- Kang Shin-il as Principal
- Kim Hong-pa as Park Moo-taek, a former police chief.
- Sung Yoo-bin as Kang Han-gyeol, student designated as a perpetrator of school violence.
- Yoo Jae-sang as Kim Gun-woo
- Jung Yoo-ahn as Do Yoon-jae
- Choi Hee-jin as Prison Guard
- Jung Taek-hyun as Jung Yi-deun
- Yoon Kyung-ho as public prosecutor
- Roh Jeong-eui as Nam Ji-ho

== Production ==
Principal photography began on May 29, 2017, and ended on August 27, 2017, at Tangeum Lake in Chungju, South Korea. The film was completed in 2018 but the release was postponed indefinitely due to the #MeToo controversy at the time.

== Reception ==
=== Box office ===
The film was released on 1007 screens on April 27, 2022. It was placed at no. 2 at the domestic box office on opening day, and the first weekend of its release.

As of July 21, 2022, it has a gross of US$3,091,257 along with 403,569 admissions.

=== Critical response ===
Oh Jin-Woo writing for Cine21 stated that the film looked at school violence from the perpetrator's point of view. Oh criticised the editing and felt that in spite of energetic performance of actors "due to the somewhat loose editing" "fun of the original story is halved." Oh concluded by writing, "Here, all the sets feel too new, so they don't fit the heavy movie theme, which interferes with immersion."

== Home media ==
The film was released on streaming service Disney+ in South Korea on June 1, 2022.
