= Pornmaking for Dummies =

2007 film directed by Kong Ja-kwan

- Theatrical poster
- Directed by: Kong Ja-kwan
- Written by: Kong Ja-kwan
- Produced by: Kim-Jho Gwangsoo; Lee Seung-su
- Starring: Jo Jae-wan; Kim Dong-soo; Kim Yang-hoon; Jeong So-jin
- Cinematography: Lee Seung-su
- Edited by: Lee Eun-cheon
- Release date: November 15, 2007
- Running time: 72 minutes
- Country: South Korea
- Language: Korean

Pornmaking for Dummies (Korean: 색화동; RR: Saekhwadong), also called The Sex Film, is a 2007 South Korean film. An independent production created by former pornographic film director Kong Ja-kwan, Pornmaking for Dummies is a fictional story based on his own personal experiences of working within that industry.

== Plot summary ==
Jin-gyu, an out of work film school graduate, applies for the position of director with pornographic film company Only4Men. The following day he is hired as an assistant director for a production called All Nude Boy, and must become accustomed to working with makeshift locations, impromptu settings, and abuse from the general public. The production's lead actress, Sabine, becomes attracted to him, and the two end up spending the night together after a staff dinner. Later, Jin-gyu gets an offer to work on a real film for a major production company.

== Release ==
Pornmaking for Dummies was given a limited release in South Korea from 15 November 2007, and received a total of 498 admissions from seven screens nationwide.
