= To My Beloved =

2012 South Korean television series

- Promotional poster
- Also known as: Dear. You; Beloved
- Hangul: 친애하는 당신에게
- RR: Chinaehaneun dangsinege
- MR: Ch'inaehanŭn tangsinege
- Genre: Drama
- Based on: Dear You by Hisashi Nozawa
- Written by: Kim Ji-eun
- Directed by: Jo Hyun-tak
- Starring: Kim Min-jun; Park Sol-mi; Hong Jong-hyun; Choi Yeo-jin
- Country of origin: South Korea
- Original language: Korean
- No. of episodes: 16

Production
- Producer: Yoon Jae-won
- Running time: 70 minutes
- Production company: Drama House

Original release
- Network: JTBC
- Release: June 27 – August 16, 2012

To My Beloved (Korean: 친애하는 당신에게; RR: Chinaehaneun dangsinege; lit. 'Dear You') is a 2012 South Korean television series starring Kim Min-jun, Park Sol-mi, Hong Jong-hyun and Choi Yeo-jin. Based on the Japanese novel Dear You by Hisashi Nozawa, it aired on JTBC from June 27 to August 16, 2012.

== Synopsis ==
Ko Jin Se ( Hong Jong-hyun) and Seo Chan-joo (Park Sol-mi) have been married for three years. They start looking back of the years they spent together when their past lovers come into their lives.

== Cast ==
=== Main ===
- Kim Min-jun as Choi Eun-hyuk
- Park Sol-mi as Seo Chan-joo
- Hong Jong-hyun as Go Jin-se
- Choi Yeo-jin as Baek In-kyung

=== Supporting ===
- Bae Noo-ri as Hong Ran
- Gu Bon-seung as Do Han-soo
- Park Si-eun as Kang Myung-jin
- Yoon Park as Park Ho-gi
- Cho Min-ah as Moon Je-ni
- Moon Jung-soo as Lee Sung-rak

== Original soundtrack ==
Released on August 1, 2012
No.	Title	Artist	Length
1.	"Because of You"	Ernest & Jo Ha-rang	4:00
2.	"Always With You"	Edan	5:54
3.	"Alone"	Woo Jin-hee	4:37
4.	"Because of You" (Inst.)	Ernest & Jo Ha-rang	4:00
5.	"Always With You" (Inst.)	Edan	5:54
6.	"Alone" (Inst.)	Woo Jin-hee	4:37

== Ratings ==
Ep.	Original broadcast date	Average audience share (AGB Nielsen)
Ep.	Original broadcast date	Nationwide
1	June 27, 2012	0.724%
2	June 28, 2012	0.508%
3	July 4, 2012	0.556%
4	July 5, 2012	0.655%
5	July 11, 2012	0.503%
6	July 12, 2012	0.641%
7	July 18, 2012	0.576%
8	July 19, 2012	0.620%
9	July 25, 2012	0.679%
10	July 26, 2012	0.615%
11	August 1, 2012	—N/a
12	August 2, 2012	—N/a
13	August 8, 2012	0.642%
14	August 9, 2012	0.429%
15	August 15, 2012	0.502%
16	August 16, 2012	0.638%
Average		— (Note: Due to some ratings not recorded, the exact average rating is unknown.)

- This drama airs on a cable channel/pay TV which normally has a relatively smaller audience compared to free-to-air TV/public broadcasters (KBS, SBS, MBC and EBS).
