= The Discloser =

- International poster
- Hangul: 1급기밀
- Lit.: Top Secret
- RR: 1geupgimil
- MR: 1kŭpkimil
- Directed by: Hong Ki-seon
- Written by: Ahn Young-soo
- Produced by: Choi Kang-hyuk
- Starring: Kim Sang-kyung; Kim Ok-vin; Choi Moo-sung; Choi Gwi-hwa
- Production company: Miin Pictures
- Distributed by: Little Big Pictures
- Release dates: July 20, 2017 (BiFan); January 24, 2018 (South Korea)
- Running time: 100 minutes
- Country: South Korea
- Language: Korean
- Box office: US$1.6 million

The Discloser (Korean: 1급기밀) is a 2017 South Korean action thriller film directed by Hong Ki-seon. The film stars Kim Sang-kyung, Kim Ok-vin, Choi Moo-sung and Choi Gwi-hwa.

== Plot ==
The story of an investigative reporter and former colonel delving into military secrets to uncover the source of a corruption case.

== Cast ==
- Kim Sang-kyung as Park Dae-ik
- Kim Ok-vin as Kim Jung-sook
- Choi Moo-sung as Cheon Hyeon-seok
- Lee Hang-na as Hee-kyung
- Choi Gwi-hwa as Nam Seon-ho
- Shin Seung-hwan
- Lee Ji-won as Park Shi-won
- Choi Go as Young-woo's son
- Jung Il-woo as Kang Young-woo
- Kwon Han-sol as Bank employee

== Production and release ==
The Discloser was director Hong Ki-seon's fourth and last feature film, and his first film in 8 years. He died of a heart attack in December 2016 at the age of 59 (three days after he finished filming The Discloser).

The Discloser had its world premiere in the "Hong Ki-seon: The Cinema Beyond Suppression" category at the 21st Bucheon International Fantastic Film Festival on July 20, 2017. The film was released in theaters on January 24, 2018.

== Reception ==
Yoon Min-sik of The Korea Herald praised the solid plot and dark and gritty tone of the film, as well as Choi Gwi-ha's performance as the antagonist in the film. Despite following the good versus evil format to some extent, the film hits the audience right on the head with its grounded atmosphere.

== Awards and nominations ==
Awards	Category	Recipient	Result	Ref.
38th Korean Association of Film Critics Awards	Special Award	Hong Ki-seon	Won	
