= Kim-Jho Gwangsoo =

South Korean filmmaker and LGBT activist (born 1965)

Kim-Jho Gwang-soo
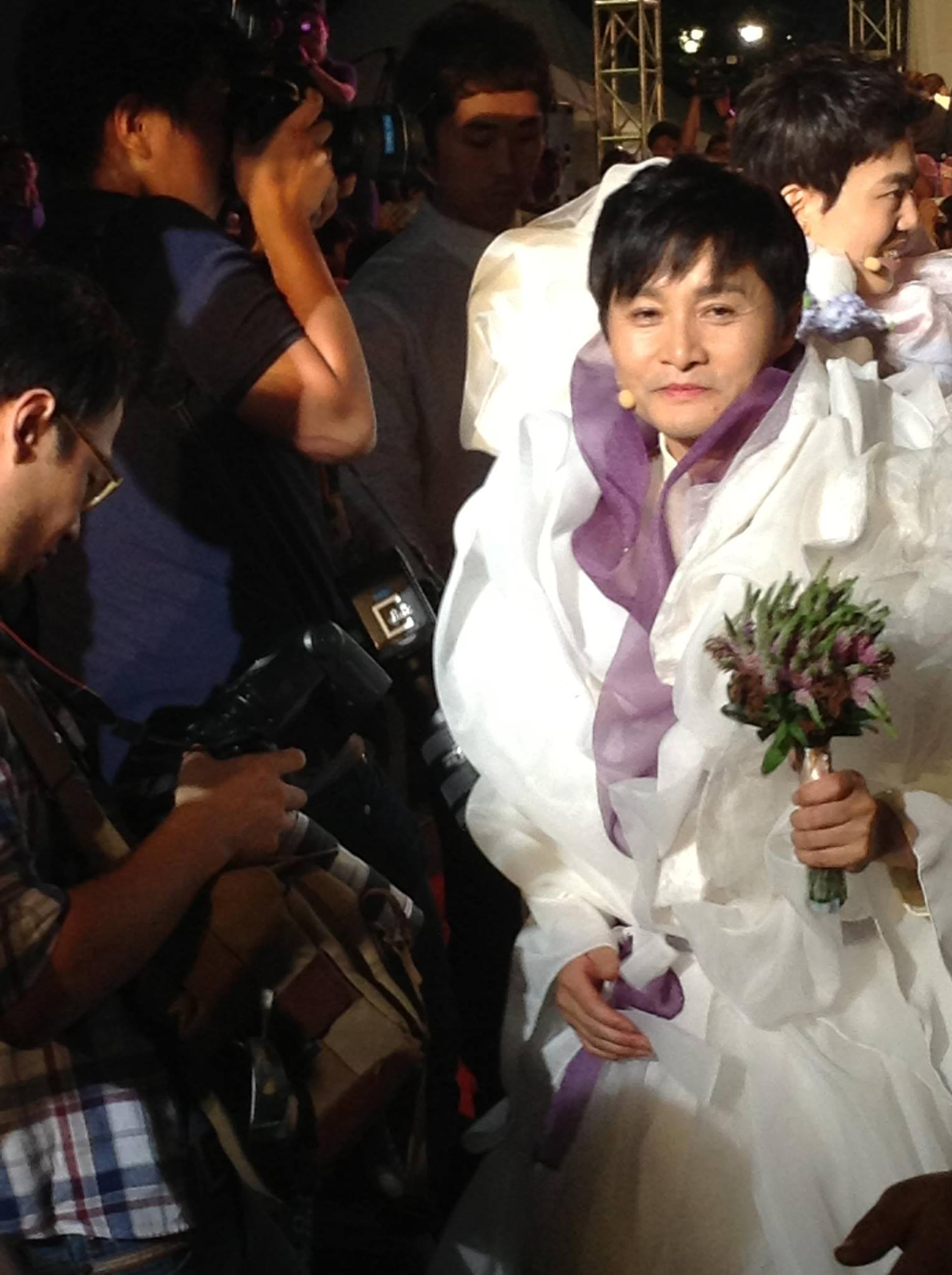
- Kim-Jho in 2013
- Born: Kim Gwang-soo; March 26, 1965 (age 61); Seongbuk District, Seoul, South Korea
- Other names: Kim-Jho Kwang-soo; Peter Kim
- Education: Hanyang University
- Occupations: Film director, screenwriter, film producer

Korean name
- Hangul: 김조광수
- Hanja: 金趙光秀
- RR: Gimjo Gwangsu
- MR: Kimjo Kwangsu

Birth name
- Hangul: 김광수
- RR: Gim Gwangsu
- MR: Kim Kwangsu

Kim-Jho Gwang-soo (Korean: 김조광수; born 26 March 1965), also known as Peter Kim, is a South Korean film director, screenwriter, film producer and LGBT rights activist.

== Career ==
Kim Gwang-soo was born in Seongbuk District, Seoul. He disclosed his sexual orientation in 2006, and legally changed his name to Kim Jho Gwang-soo. Kim-Jho is one of South Korea's few openly gay film directors and has been involved in the production of several works with LGBT themes.

He collaborated with director Leesong Hee-il to produce the 2006 film No Regret, considered to be "the first real Korean gay feature." In 2008, he directed and wrote his first short film, Boy Meets Boy as well as two follow-ups: Just Friends? (2009) and LOVE, 100°C (2010). His first feature film, Two Weddings and a Funeral was released in 2012.

== Personal life ==
Kim Jho held a public, non-legal wedding ceremony with film distributor and LGBT activist David Kim Seung-hwan (his partner since 2004), in Seoul on September 7, 2013, the first of its kind in the country which does not recognize same-sex marriages. The preparations for their wedding and the ceremony itself was the subject of Jang Hee-sun's 2015 documentary My Fair Wedding.

== Filmography ==
=== Director ===
- 2008 Boy Meets Boy
- 2009 Just Friends?
- 2010 Ghost (Be With Me)
- 2010 LOVE, 100°C
- 2012 Two Weddings and a Funeral
- 2014 One Night Only

=== Writer ===
- 2008 Boy Meets Boy
- 2009 Just Friends?
- 2010 LOVE, 100°C
- 2014 One Night Only

=== Producer ===
- 2001 Wanee & Junah
- 2002 Jealousy Is My Middle Name
- 2004 So Cute
- 2005 The Red Shoes
- 2006 No Regret
- 2006 Old Miss Diary
- 2007 Boys of Tomorrow
- 2007 Pornmaking for Dummies
- 2007 Milky Way Liberation Front
- 2010 Ghost (Be With Me)
- 2010 Break Away
- 2011 Detective K: Secret of the Virtuous Widow
- 2011 The Client
- 2015 Detective K: Secret of the Lost Island
- 2019 Jo Pil-ho: The Dawning Rage

== See also ==
- List of Korean film directors
- Cinema of Korea
- Contemporary culture of South Korea
