= Two Weddings and a Funeral =

- Film poster
- Directed by: Kim Jho Kwang-soo
- Written by: Park Hae-young; Kim Yun-shin
- Produced by: Lee Seon-mi; Lee Ji-yeon; Kim Jeong-yeong
- Starring: Kim Dong-yoon; Ryu Hyun-kyung; Song Yong-jin; Jung Ae-yeon
- Cinematography: Kim Myeong-joon
- Edited by: Kwon Hyo-lim
- Music by: Kim Dong-wook
- Production company: Generation Blue Films
- Distributed by: Jinjin Pictures
- Release date: June 21, 2012
- Running time: 107 minutes
- Country: South Korea
- Language: Korean
- Budget: US$300,000

Two Weddings and a Funeral (Korean: 두 번의 결혼식과 한 번의 장례식; RR: Du beonui gyeolhonsikgwa han beonui jangnyesik) is a 2012 South Korean gay romantic comedy film that explores the taboos and intolerance in Korean society in the story of a gay man and lesbian who enter into a sham marriage. It is the feature film debut of out filmmaker Kim Jho Kwang-soo, and his fourth LGBT-themed film.

Although the film didn't emerge as a mainstream hit, its 10-day total of 32,000 admissions was impressive for a specialty release, making it the most commercially successful queer Korean film yet.

== Plot ==
A gay man, Min-soo (Kim Dong-yoon) and a lesbian woman, Hyo-jin (Ryu Hyun-kyung) are both promising doctors at a general hospital. The colleagues agree to marry so Hyo-jin can legally adopt a child with her lover of ten years Seo-young (Jung Ae-yeon), and Min-soo can please his parents while maintaining his closeted lifestyle. While secretly living with their respective partners, who move in next door, Min-soo and Hyo-jin appear to be a happy, "normal" couple. They enjoy all the benefits afforded to heterosexual couples and are also able to ward off public scrutiny and parental disapproval. However, Min-soo's intrusive parents begin to get a bit too involved with the couple's life, threatening their scheme.

== Cast ==
- Kim Dong-yoon - Min-soo
- Ryu Hyun-kyung - Hyo-jin
- Song Yong-jin - Seok
- Jung Ae-yeon - Seo-young
- Park Jung-pyo - Tina
- Park Soo-young - Big sister
- Lee Seung-joon - Kyeong-nam
- Kim Joon-beom - Joo-noh
- Han Seung-do - Young-gil
- Jang Se-hyun - Ik-hoon
- Jung In-young - Nurse Na
- Choi Il-hwa - Min-soo's father
- Shin Hye-jung - Min-soo's mother
- Kim Hyuk - Seok's ex-boyfriend
- Yoo Yeon-seok - Joon, Seok's younger brother
- Kwon Hae-hyo - senior colleague doctor (cameo)
- Lee Moon-sik - priest (cameo)
- Jung In-gi - taxi driver (cameo)
