= The Perfect Couple (2007 film) =

- Theatrical release poster
- Hangul: 최강 로맨스
- Hanja: 最強 로맨스
- RR: Choegang romaenseu
- MR: Ch'oegang romaensŭ
- Directed by: Kim Jung-woo
- Written by: Lee Jong-seop
- Produced by: Kim Min-gi; Lee Min-ho; Heo Chang
- Starring: Lee Dong-wook; Hyun Young
- Cinematography: Yun Myeong-shik
- Edited by: Ko Im-pyo
- Music by: Sohn Moo-hyun
- Distributed by: Showbox
- Release date: 25 January 2007
- Running time: 109 minutes
- Country: South Korea
- Language: Korean
- Box office: $7,228,471

The Perfect Couple (Korean: 최강 로맨스; RR: Choegang romaenseu), also known as The Best Romance, is a 2007 South Korean film.

== Plot ==
While eating skewered tempura at a street vendor, young reporter Choi Soo-jin accidentally sticks the skewer into the side of a detective, Kang Jae-hyuk, who was chasing a suspected criminal. After this encounter, Soo-jin is told to work on a story about a detective, and the detective turns out to be Jae-hyuk. Soo-jin joins his crackdown on drug dealers, and the two start to fall in love.

== Cast ==
- Lee Dong-wook as Kang Jae-hyuk
- Hyun Young as Choi Soo-jin
- Lee Jeong-heon
- Jeon Soo-kyeong
- Kim Jung-heon as Handsome boy
- Jeong Jae-jin
- Kim Jae-man
- Kim Seung-min
- Joo Seok-tae
- Lee Myeong-jin
- Jang Hyun-sung (cameo)

== Release ==
The Perfect Couple was released in South Korea on 25 January 2007, and topped the box office on its opening weekend with 380,933 admissions. It went on to receive a total of 1,299,274 admissions nationwide, with a gross (as of 18 March 2007) of $7,228,471.
