= With a Girl of Black Soil =

2007 film

- Directed by: Jeon Soo-il
- Screenplay by: Lee Isaac Chung; Jeon Soo-il; Samuel Gray Anderson; Jung Soon-Young
- Starring: Yoo Yeon-mi
- Cinematography: Kim Seong-tae
- Edited by: Seo Yong-deok
- Music by: Gae Su-jeong
- Release date: 2007
- Language: Korean

With a Girl of Black Soil (Korean: 검은 땅의 소녀와; French: La Petite Fille de la terre noire), is a 2007 South Korean-French drama film co-written and directed by Jeon Soo-il.

The film premiered in the Orizzonti section at the 64th edition of the Venice Film Festival, winning the Lina Mangiacapre Award and the Art Cinema CICAE Award. It was awarded best film at the 2008 Deauville Asian Film Festival, and won the NETPAC Award at the 12th Busan International Film Festival.

== Cast ==
- Yoo Yeon-mi as Yeong-lim
- Park Hyun-woo as Dong-gu
- Jo Yung-jin as Father Hagon
- Yoo Soon-cheol as Old Man Kim
- Lim Jin-taek as Yong-hoon
- Kim Jin-hyuk as Landlord
- Kim Ae-kyung as Restaurant Owner
- Kang Soo-yeon
