= Boy Meets Boy (2008 film) =

- Theatrical poster
- Hangul: 소년, 소년을 만나다
- Hanja: 少年, 少年을 만나다
- RR: Sonyeon, sonyeoneul mannada
- MR: Sonyŏn, sonyŏnŭl mannada
- Directed by: Kim-Jho Gwangsoo
- Written by: Kim-Jho Gwangsoo; Min Yong-geun
- Produced by: Song Tae-jong
- Starring: Kim Hye-sung; Lee Hyun-jin; Ye Ji-won
- Cinematography: Kim Myeong-joon
- Edited by: No Seung-mi
- Music by: Kim Dong-wook
- Production company: Generation Blue Films
- Release date: November 20, 2008
- Running time: 13 minutes
- Country: South Korea
- Language: Korean

Boy Meets Boy (Korean: 소년, 소년을 만나다) is a 2008 South Korean short film directed by Kim-Jho Gwangsoo.

It premiered at the 13th Pusan International Film Festival in 2008. It was theatrically released in South Korea on November 20, 2008.

== Themes ==
The film is noted for its exploration of unspoken adolescent attraction and the innocence of first love within a South Korean context. Director Kim-Jho Gwangsoo utilizes minimal dialogue and fantasy elements, such as the appearance of a fairy, to convey the internal emotional landscape of the characters.

== Plot ==
A short film with no spoken dialogue, Boy Meets Boy depicts the relationship between Minsu (Kim Hye Sung) and Seok-i (Lee Hyun-jin). The two come face-to-face on a bus after Minsu drops a roll of film after putting away his schoolwork into his, and to his luck it rolls to Seok-i's foot. Seok-i then picks it up and Minsu sets out to retrieve it. There is an instant spark through their silent gazes and then electric chemistry is visible when Seok-i silently returns Minsu's film. Minsu shyly walks back to discover his seat is taken by a woman who politely returns his bag, so he opts for standing until he reaches his stop. Minsu gets off the bus after it arrives at a stop, expecting Seok-i to have followed behind. However he is disappointed to discover that he was not being followed by anyone. Disappointed, he walks aimlessly and looks back once more, only to crash into Seok-i. A fairy (Ye Ji-won) appears and gives Minsu advice on love through a song. Seok-i takes off his hat and approaches Minsu, returning the latter's camera. It is revealed through flashbacks that Seok-i has in fact been following Minsu with the intention of giving him back his camera, which was stolen when Seok-i and his friends mugged him. As Seok-i walks away, Minsu runs after him and they embrace, with the fairy returning to reveal a few flashbacks of Seok-i waiting around for Minsu to return the camera, the last flashback occurring right before they both board that same bus.

== Cast ==
- Kim Hye-sung as Minsu
- Lee Hyun-jin as Seok-i
- Ye Ji-won as the fairy

== See also ==
- Just Friends?
