= Going by the Book =

- Theatrical poster
- Hangul: 바르게 살자
- RR: Bareuge salja
- MR: Parŭge salja
- Directed by: Ra Hee-chan
- Written by: Jang Jin; Lee Gyu-bok
- Produced by: Jang Jin
- Starring: Jung Jae-young; Son Byong-ho
- Cinematography: Kim Jun-young
- Edited by: Kim Sang-bum; Kim Jae-bum
- Music by: Han Jae-kwon
- Distributed by: CJ Entertainment
- Release date: October 18, 2007
- Running time: 102 minutes
- Country: South Korea
- Language: Korean
- Box office: US$14,961,069

Going by the Book (Korean: 바르게 살자; RR: Bareuge salja) is a 2007 South Korean heist action comedy film. This is a remake of the 1991 Japanese film Asobi no jikan wa owaranai (遊びの時間は終らない).

== Plot ==
Jung Do-man is a low-ranking traffic cop whose tendency to do things "by the book" sometimes gets him in trouble, such as when he pulls over his new boss, newly instated police chief Lee Seung-man, and issues him with a traffic ticket. Though surprised and annoyed by the unexpected fine, the police chief has bigger problems; the town of Sampo has been hit by a string of bank robberies, and to reassure the public he decides to carry out a realistic drill which will demonstrate the police force's capability. Do-man is chosen to act out the part of the bank robber, but with his usual fastidious attention to detail he sets out to commit the perfect crime.

== Cast ==
- Jung Jae-young as Jung Do-man
- Son Byong-ho as Lee Seung-man
- Uhm Soo-jung as Han So-young
- Lee Young-eun as Jeon Da-hye
- Ko Chang-seok as Woo Jong-dae
- Lee Cheol-min as Jo Seong-wook
- Shin Goo as Do-man's father
- Lee Yong-yi as Do-man's mother
- Im Ji-eun as Kim Sung-mi
- Joo Jin-mo as bank branch manager
- Lee Han-wi as police force team leader
- Jo Deok-hyun as adviser
- Kim Kyu-chul as senior Kim
- Jo Shi-nae as Miss Lee
- Son Byeong-wook as camera man
- Lee Moon-su as negotiator
- Lee Hae-yeong as Song Gyung-tae
- Kim Seung-hun as Detective #2
- Park Sung-il as SWAT 4
- Kong Ho-suk as old man
- Jin Yong-ok as bank robber 1

== Release ==
Going by the Book was released in South Korea on 18 October 2007, and topped the box office on its opening weekend with 464,699 admissions. It held that position for a second successive weekend, going on to receive a total of 2,190,250 admissions nationwide, with a gross (as of 16 December 2007) of US$14,961,069.
