= Sector 7 (film) =

2011 South Korean science fiction action film by Kim Ji-hun

- Theatrical release poster
- Hangul: 7광구
- Hanja: 七鑛區
- RR: 7gwanggu
- MR: 7kwanggu
- Directed by: Kim Ji-hoon
- Written by: Yoon Je-kyoon; Jung Hae-sim; Kim Hwi; Kim Ji-hoon
- Produced by: Yoon Je-kyoon; Lee Han-seung; Choi Yun-ho
- Starring: Ha Ji-won; Oh Ji-ho; Ahn Sung-ki; Park Chul-min
- Cinematography: Lee Doo-man
- Edited by: Wang Sung-ik
- Music by: Kim Seong-hyeon
- Production company: JK Films
- Distributed by: CJ Entertainment
- Release date: August 4, 2011
- Running time: 104 minutes
- Country: South Korea
- Language: Korean
- Budget: US$10 million
- Box office: US$18.6 million

Sector 7 (Korean: 7광구) is a 2011 South Korean 3D science fiction action horror film directed by Kim Ji-hoon who previously made May 18. The film stars Ha Ji-won, Oh Ji-ho, Ahn Sung-ki and Park Chul-min.

In 2012 Shout! Factory released the film on DVD, Blu-ray Disc, and Blu-ray 3D.

== Plot ==
A small team of oil rig workers are searching for undiscovered oil at the oil rig Sector 7, off the coast of Jeju Island. After the tension builds from countless failures, the main character Hae-joon's uncle returns with the hope of searching the untapped wells of oil. What they don't realize is that he has a much different motive. Working together with a researcher on board the rig, he plans to breed a newly discovered life-form whose bodily fluids can burn for longer than 30 hours, as a new form of fuel instead of oil.

But tragedy strikes as the specimen escapes with deaths of the researcher, the doctor, and another worker to follow. With the loss of the main power, the workers become stranded as the creature begins to hunt for its next meal. Armed with nothing but a few guns and the knowledge of the creature's minor susceptibility to flame, the remaining workers must work together to kill the beast before it hunts them down one by one, and escape the oil rig. But with its incredible speed (despite its size), its lightning fast, spear-like tongue, and its nearly impenetrable hide, they may not stand a chance.

== Production ==
Sector 7's director, Kim Ji-hoon, said that the film was made with the intent to capitalize on the success of Bong Joon-ho's The Host (2006).

Of the 1,800 cuts, the CG accounted for 1,748 cuts. The monsters appearing in the movie come from the appearance of sea creatures such as sea squirt.

== Cast ==
- Ha Ji-won as Cha Hae-joon
- Oh Ji-ho as Kim Dong-soo
- Ahn Sung-ki as Captain Lee Jeong-man
- Park Chul-min as Do Sang-goo
- Song Sae-byeok as Go Jong-yoon
- Lee Han-wi as Jang Moon-hyeong
- Cha Ye-ryun as Park Hyeon-jeong
