= Yoo Yeon-mi =

South Korean actress (born 1999)

- Born: July 7, 1999 (age 27); Daegu, South Korea
- Occupation: Actress
- Years active: 2005–present

Korean name
- Hangul: 유연미
- RR: Yu Yeonmi
- MR: Yu Yŏnmi

Yoo Yeon-mi (Korean: 유연미; born July 7, 1999) is a South Korean actress. She began her career as a child actress, notably in Jeon Soo-il's indie film With a Girl of Black Soil (2007), for which she received the Best Actress award at the Marrakech International Film Festival. Yoo also starred in the television dramas Golden Apple (2005), Great Inheritance (2006), and Missing You (2012).

== Filmography ==
=== Film ===
Year	Title	Role
2007	With a Girl of Black Soil	Choi Young-rim
2008	BABO	Ji-in
2010	The Man from Nowhere	Mi-jin
2012	Heimat	
2013	Boomerang Family	Shin Min-kyung's school friend
2013	El Condor Pasa	Yeon-mi
2014	Thread of Lies	Mi-ra

=== Television series ===
Year	Title	Role	Network
2005	Golden Apple	young Keum-shil	KBS2
2006	Hello Franceska	Soo-na's granddaughter (guest, episode 39)	MBC
2006	KBS TV Novel: "Hometown Station"	Young-shim	KBS1
2006	Great Inheritance	Han Ye-seo	KBS2
2007	Thank You	Bo-ram	MBC
2007	Mackerel Run	guest	SBS
2007	Unstoppable Marriage	Kim Ok-hee	KBS2
2009	The Road Home	Yoo Eun-ji	KBS1
2009	Kyung-sook, Kyung-sook's Father	Eun-bi	KBS2
2010	The Great Merchant	Kkot-nim	KBS1
2010	Athena: Goddess of War	Kwon Yong-kwan's daughter	SBS
2011	Lights and Shadows	Soon-deok	MBC
2012	Missing You	young Kim Eun-joo	MBC
2013	Jang Ok-jung, Living by Love	young Kakoong (cameo)	SBS
2015	Who Are You: School 2015	Yeon Mi-joo	KBS2
2016	Page Turner	Gyoo-sun	KBS2

=== Variety show ===
Year	Title
2006	Show Power Video - Chick Diary

== Musical theatre ==
Year	Title	Role
2008	Momo	Momo

== Awards and nominations ==
Year	Award	Category	Nominated work	Result
2005	KBS Drama Awards	Best Young Actress	Golden Apple	Won
2007	7th Marrakech International Film Festival	Best Actress	With a Girl of Black Soil	Won
2008	17th Buil Film Awards	Best New Actress	With a Girl of Black Soil	Won
