= Kim Myeong-joon =

South Korean filmmaker

- Born: South Korea
- Occupations: Film director, cinematographer

Korean name
- Hangul: 김명준
- RR: Gim Myeongjun
- MR: Kim Myŏngjun

Kim Myeong-joon is a South Korean film director and cinematographer. Kim's directorial feature film Our School (2007), a documentary about the lives of ethnic Korean students in Japan, won the BIFF Mecenat Award for best documentary at the 2006 Busan International Film Festival and the Kim Yong-gun Memorial Society prize in 2008. His latest baseball-themed documentary Strangers on the Field (2015), which also focused on Koreans that have grown up in Japan, debuted at the 19th Busan International Film Festival in 2014.

== Filmography ==
- Hibernation (short film, 1998) - cinematographer
- Flower Island (2001) - cinematographer
- Wanee & Junah (2001) - cinematographer
- Memories of a Zoo (short film, 2002) - cinematographer
- M(other), Beautiful May (2003) - cinematographer
- HANA (documentary, 2003) - director, cinematographer, editor, executive producer
- Our School (documentary, 2007) - director, screenwriter, cinematographer, narrator, editor, lighting
- Boy Meets Boy (2008) - cinematographer
- The Sword with No Name (2009) - cinematographer, storyboard
- Just Friends? (2009) - cinematographer
- Ghost (Be with Me) (2010) - cinematographer
- Short! Short! Short! 2010 (2011) - cinematographer
- Two Weddings and a Funeral (2012) - cinematographer
- Strangers on the Field (documentary, 2015) - director, screenwriter, cinematographer, editor, actor
