= Our School (film) =

2007 South Korean documentary film

- Theatrical poster
- Hangul: 우리 학교
- Hanja: 우리 學校
- RR: Uri hakgyo
- MR: Uri hakkyo
- Directed by: Kim Myeong-joon
- Written by: Kim Myeong-joon; Park So-hyeon
- Narrated by: Kim Myeong-joon
- Edited by: Kim Myeong-joon; Park So-hyeon
- Distributed by: Jinjin Pictures
- Release date: March 29, 2007
- Running time: 131 minutes
- Country: South Korea
- Language: Korean

Our School (Korean: 우리 학교) is a documentary film about the lives of ethnic Korean students in a Chongryon-run pro-North Korean high school in Hokkaido, Japan. Released on 29 March 2007 (Sunday), a Hankook Ilbo article on 3 April stated it had already exceeded 10,000 viewers. In the end, media reports claim it registered 85,000 or 90,000 viewer admissions in the South Korean domestic market, a far better performance than other recent documentaries such as the 2002 Yeongmae (영매, 20,000 viewers), the 2004 Repatriation (송환, 30,000 viewers) or the 2006 Bisang (비상, 40,000 viewers); it was suggested this might be a new domestic record. Director Kim Myeong-joon received the Kim Yong-gun Memorial Society prize in relation to his work on the film.

The film was released on DVD in Japan in 2009.

== See also ==
- Hokkaido Korean Primary, Middle and High School
