= Park Sol-mi =

South Korean actress (born 1978)

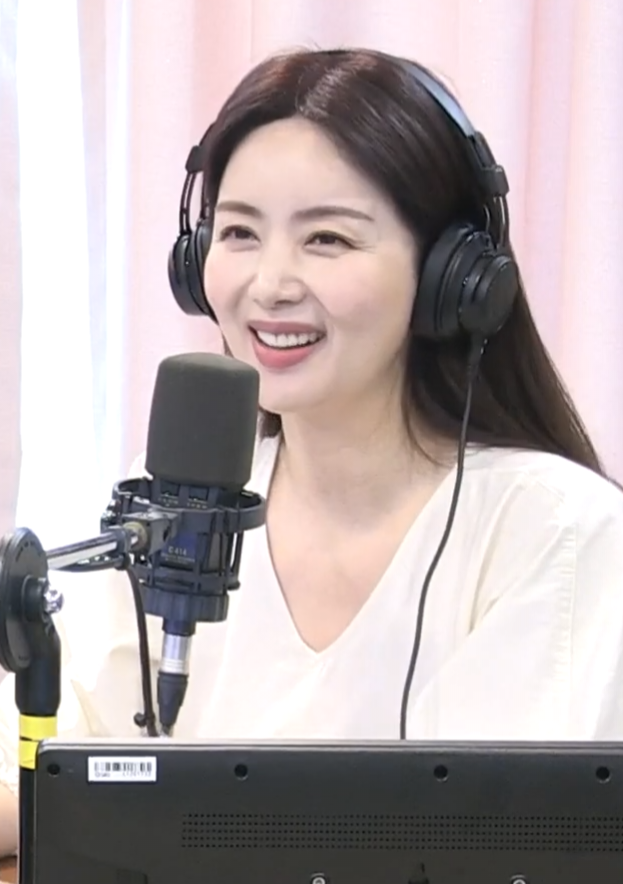
- Park in April 2022
- Born: Park Hye-jeong; January 3, 1978 (age 48); Iksan, South Korea
- Education: Sangmyung University – Film and Media Studies (1996); Sungkyunkwan University – Graduate School of Performing Arts
- Occupation: Actress
- Years active: 1996–present
- Agent: EL Park
- Spouse: Han Jae-suk (m. 2013)
- Children: 2

Korean name
- Hangul: 박솔미
- Hanja: 朴帥眉
- RR: Bak Solmi
- MR: Pak Solmi

Birth name
- Hangul: 박혜정
- RR: Bak Hyejeong
- MR: Pak Hyejŏng

Park Sol-mi (Korean: 박솔미; born January 3, 1978), birth name Park Hye-jeong, is a South Korean actress. She received a Best Supporting Actress nomination at the Blue Dragon Film Awards for the 2007 movie Paradise Murdered.

== Acting career ==
Park had a minor role in the 1996 series Papa, then made her official debut in MBC's amateur talent contest in 1998. Her breakthrough came in 2002 when she starred in several television dramas, including Bad Girls and the popular Winter Sonata. In 2004 she made her film debut in Park Jung-woo's Dance with the Wind, which required her to learn ballroom dancing over a four-month period of intensive training. For her second film, Paradise Murdered, Park received a nomination for Best Supporting Actress at the 2007 Blue Dragon Film Awards.

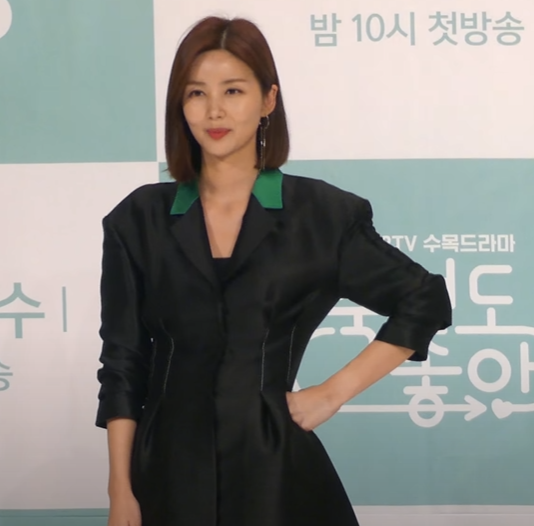
Park in 2018

In 2008, Park signed a contract with management company Heavenly Star Entertainment. After a three-year hiatus from television, she was announced as the lead in the MBC drama My Lady, a remake of the 1980s series Terminal. Park said that she found the character of Sera appealing because of the good and bad sides to her personality.

In October 2018, Park signed with new agency Fantagio.

== Other pursuits ==
In addition to being an actress, Park is also an amateur pianist. After attending a concert by Japanese pop group Jaja in 2005, she expressed a desire to perform with the band, and was later invited to play on their second album, I Love You. Park played piano on the album's title track, and also appeared in the promotional video. The album was released in February 2006by Horipro under its MusicTaste imprint. She is also active in Japan with various promotions and commercials.

In 2024, Park launched her own kimchi product online called "Sol-mi Kimchi" under her food brand The Boksoon. The product became a big hit through Korean home shopping. In September 2026, Park's close friend Song Hye-kyo, endorsed the kimchi online through her Instagram account.

== Personal life ==
Park began dating actor Han Jae-suk after they starred together in The Great Merchant in 2010. They wed at Aston House, Sheraton Grande Walkerhill Hotel in Seoul on April 21, 2013. In September 2013, Park's agency announced that the couple was expecting their first child. Their first daughter was born in 2014 and their second daughter was born in 2015.

== Filmography ==
=== Television series ===
Year	Title	Role
1996	Papa	Friend of Hee-joo's fiancée's younger sister (ep.15)
2001	Wuri's Family	Han Ha-na
2002	Winter Sonata	Oh Chae-rin
2002	Bad Girls	Park Jae-kyung
2003	All In	Seo Jin-hee
2005	Golden Apple	Kim Kyung-sook
2008	My Lady	Se-ra
2009	Style	Choi Ae-young (ep.7–8)
2010	The Great Merchant	Oh Moon-seon
2012	To My Beloved	Seo Chan-joo
2016	My Lawyer, Mr. Jo	Jang Hae-kyung
2018	Feel Good to Die	Yoo Shi-baek

=== Film ===
Year	Title	Role
2004	Dance with the Wind	Song Yeon-hwa
2007	Paradise Murdered	Jang Gwi-nam
2009	Handphone	Kim Jeong-yeon
2022	Handsome	Ari

=== Variety shows ===
Year	Title	Notes/Ref.
2012–2013	Law of the Jungle in Amazon & Galapagos	Cast member (episodes 41–50)
2018	Law of the Jungle in Sabah	Cast member (episodes 325–329)
2021–present	The Return of Superman	Narrator (episode 383, episodes 385–present)
2021–present	Happy Beauty Day	Host
2021–present	Stars' Top Recipe at Fun-Staurant	Cast member (episode 104-present)

== Awards ==
Year	Award	Category	Nominated work
1998	MBC New Talent Contest	Grand Prize	—N/a
1998	MBC New Talent Contest	Netizen Popularity Award	—N/a
2002	SBS Drama Awards	New Star Award	Bad Girls
2007	Blue Dragon Film Awards	Best Supporting actress	Paradise Murdered
