= Kim Sang-kyung =

South Korean actor (born 1972)

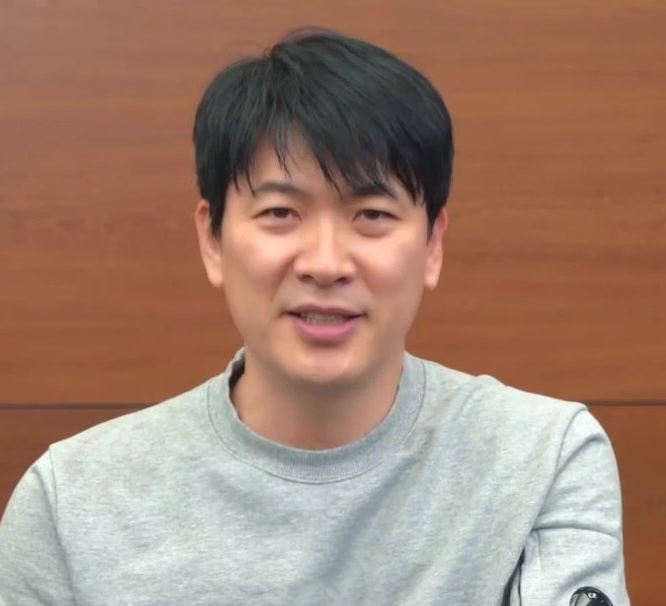
- Kim in 2022
- Born: June 1, 1972 (age 54); Seoul, South Korea
- Education: Chung-Ang University (B.A. Theater and Film) (Graduate School of Advanced Imaging Science, Multimedia and Film)
- Occupation: Actor
- Years active: 1998–present
- Spouse: Kim Eun-gyung (m. 2007)

Korean name
- Hangul: 김상경
- Hanja: 金相慶
- RR: Gim Sanggyeong
- MR: Kim Sanggyŏng

Kim Sang-kyung (Korean: 김상경; born June 1, 1972) is a South Korean actor. He is best known for his leading roles in Memories of Murder (2003), May 18 (2007), and The Tower (2012). Kim is also known for his collaborations with filmmaker Hong Sang-soo in On the Occasion of Remembering the Turning Gate (2002), Tale of Cinema (2005), and Ha Ha Ha (2010). He has starred in numerous television dramas, notably the period epic The Great King, Sejong (2008), the family comedy What Happens to My Family? (2014), and the historical drama The Crowned Clown (2019).

== Filmography ==
=== Film ===
Year	Title	Role	Notes	Ref.
1998	If the Sun Rises in the West	Baseball player	Bit part	
2002	On the Occasion of Remembering the Turning Gate	Gyung-soo		
2003	Memories of Murder	Seo Tae-yoon		
2004	How to Keep My Love	Kim So-hoon		
2005	Tale of Cinema	Kim Dong-soo		
2006	The World of Silence	Ryoo Jung-ho		
2007	May 18	Kang Min-woo		
2010	Ha Ha Ha	Joo Moon-kyeong		
2010	Cafe Noir	Man waiting for a flower	Bit part	
2012	The Tower	Lee Dae-ho		
2013	Montage	Cheong-ho		
2014	Dad for Rent	Chae Tae-man		
2015	The Deal	Min Tae-soo		
2017	The Discloser	Dae-ik		
2018	The Princess and the Matchmaker	King		
2018	The Vanished	Woo Jung-sik		
2019	Namsan, Poet Murder Incident	Kim Gi-chae		
2022	The Pirates: The Last Royal Treasure	Jangsu	Cameo	
2022	Air Murder	Jung Tae-hoon		

=== Television series ===
Year	Title	Role	Notes	Ref.
1998	Love and Success			
1998	Advocate	Chan Chul-ho		
1999	Wang Cho aka The Boss			
1999	Last War	Jung Yoon-suk		
1999	Invitation	Seung-jin		
1999	Days of Delight	Hong Joon-jae		
2000	Drama City "Who Marries a Millionaire?"			
2000	SWAT Police	Kim Sang-kyung		
2000	Medical Center	Park Hyun-il		
2000	Snowflakes	Kim Tae-bin		
2001	Hong Guk-young	Hong Guk-young		
2002	Drama City "A Very Special Companion"			
2004	New Human Market	Jang Chong-chan		
2005	Lawyers	Suh Jung-ho		
2008	The Great King, Sejong	King Sejong		
2010	My Country Calls	Go Jin-hyuk		
2011	White Christmas	Kim Yo-han		
2014	What Happens to My Family?	Moon Tae-joo		
2016	Jang Yeong-sil	King Sejong		
2019	The Crowned Clown	Yi Kyu		
2019	Miss Lee	Yoo Jin-wook		
2021	Racket Boys	Yoon Hyun-jong		
2022–2023	Poong, the Joseon Psychiatrist	Gye Ji-han	Season 1–2	

== Theater ==
- Mom, Do You Want to Go on a Trip? (2009)

== Awards and nominations ==
Year	Award	Category	Nominated work	Result
1999	MBC Drama Awards	Best New Actor	Last War	Won
2000	KBS Drama Awards	Popularity Award	Snowflakes	Won
2002	10th Chunsa Film Awards	Best New Actor	On the Occasion of Remembering the Turning Gate	Won
2005	MBC Drama Awards	Excellence Award, Actor	Lawyers	Nominated
2005	MBC Drama Awards	Popularity Award, Actor	Lawyers	Nominated
2007	1st Korea Movie Star Awards	Best Tears Award	May 18	Won
2008	Grimae Awards	Best Actor	The Great King, Sejong	Won
2008	KBS Drama Awards	Top Excellence Award, Actor	The Great King, Sejong	Nominated
2008	KBS Drama Awards	Netizen Award, Actor	The Great King, Sejong	Nominated
2008	KBS Drama Awards	Best Couple Award with Lee Yoon-ji	The Great King, Sejong	Nominated
2010	KBS Drama Awards	Excellence Award, Actor in a Miniseries	My Country Calls	Nominated
2014	KBS Drama Awards	Top Excellence Award, Actor	What's With This Family	Nominated
2014	KBS Drama Awards	Excellence Award, Actor in a Serial Drama	What's With This Family	Won
2014	KBS Drama Awards	Netizen Award, Actor	What's With This Family	Nominated
2014	KBS Drama Awards	Best Couple Award with Kim Hyun-joo	What's With This Family	Won
2018	38th Golden Cinematography Awards	Jury Special Award	The Discloser	Won
2019	55th Baeksang Arts Awards	Best Supporting Actor	The Crowned Clown	Nominated
2021	SBS Drama Awards	Top Excellence Award, Actor in a Miniseries Genre/Fantasy Drama	Racket Boys	Nominated
