= Paradise Murdered =

- Film poster
- Hangul: 극락도 살인사건
- Hanja: 極樂島殺人事件
- RR: Geungnakdo sarin sageon
- MR: Kŭngnakto sarin sakŏn
- Directed by: Kim Han-min
- Written by: Kim Han-min
- Produced by: Choi Du-young; Shin Hye-yeon
- Starring: Park Hae-il; Park Sol-mi; Sung Ji-ru; Lee Dae-yeon; Park Won-sang; Choi Joo-bong
- Cinematography: Kim Yong-heung
- Edited by: Shin Min-kyung
- Music by: Bang Jun-seok
- Production companies: Pancinema; Myung Films; Doo Entertainment; DCG Plus; KD Media
- Distributed by: MK Pictures
- Release date: April 12, 2007
- Running time: 112 minutes
- Country: South Korea
- Language: Korean
- Box office: US$14.2 million

Paradise Murdered (Korean: 극락도 살인사건; lit. 'Homicide Case on Paradise') is a 2007 South Korean film starring Park Hae-il and Park Sol-mi, and is the directorial debut of filmmaker Kim Han-min.

== Plot ==
Off the southern coast of the Korean Peninsula, an island of 17 inhabitants exists. The so-called Paradise Island holds up to its name with its beautiful mountains and sea coupled with kind people. No worries or stress holds for anyone who comes to visit this oasis. But this peace doesn't last long as every single one of the inhabitants disappear one day without a single trace. Chaos initially breaks out when a blood-drenched corpse is found and everyone becomes a suspect. The furious sea allows them no boat ride to the mainland and their only existing radio communication device has been smashed. Trapped together on the island, everyone is suspicious of each other and even the unseen could be a possible suspect. As hideous secrets get revealed day by day, an island of paradise slowly turns into an island of death.
