= A Love (2007 film) =

- A Love (Sarang) movie poster
- Hangul: 사랑
- RR: Sarang
- MR: Sarang
- Directed by: Kwak Kyung-taek
- Written by: Kwak Kyung-taek
- Produced by: Jeong Tae-won; Yang Jung-kyeong
- Starring: Joo Jin-mo; Park Si-yeon
- Cinematography: Ki Se-hun
- Edited by: Park Gwang-il
- Music by: Yoon Min-hwa
- Production companies: Lotte Entertainment; Taewon Entertainment; Jininsa Films; AMUSE
- Distributed by: CJ Entertainment
- Release date: September 19, 2007
- Running time: 104 minutes
- Country: South Korea
- Language: Korean
- Box office: US$14.5 million

A Love (Korean: 사랑; RR: Sarang) is a 2007 South Korean action drama film starring Joo Jin-mo and Park Si-yeon and directed by Kwak Kyung-taek.

== Plot ==
In-ho is a naive but tough teenager, who is trying hard to stay out of trouble, but he willingly sacrifices everything to protect his childhood girlfriend Mi-ju. But their relationship is wrapped in tragedy. The girl is raped as an act of revenge after her mother and brother both die before they settled financial debts with a gang. In-ho retaliates by attacking the rapist, and he and Mi-ju try to escape, but they are thwarted by the gangsters. Mi-ju ends up going to Japan and In-ho goes to jail.

Years later, he finds a job at a steel company and gets scouted by its owner to be his personal secretary and bodyguard. Life gets a little easier for him, until suddenly Mi-ju reappears ― as his boss's mistress.

In-ho has held onto his unwavering love for Mi-ju throughout his prison term and long days of separation, and for Mi-ju, it has always been impossible to forget her beloved In-ho. But the more their love for each other deepens, the more difficult it becomes for the star-crossed lovers to be together.

== Cast ==
- Joo Jin-mo - In-ho
- Park Si-yeon - Mi-ju
- Joo Hyun - Chairman Yoo
- Kim Min-jun - Chi-gwon
