= May 18 (film) =

2007 South Korean historical drama film

- Theatrical release poster
- Hangul: 화려한 휴가
- Hanja: 華麗한 休暇
- RR: Hwaryeohan hyuga
- MR: Hwaryŏhan hyuga
- Directed by: Kim Ji-hoon
- Written by: Na Hyeon
- Produced by: Yoo In-taek; Park Chang-hyeon; Lee Su-nam
- Starring: Ahn Sung-ki; Kim Sang-kyung; Lee Yo-won; Lee Joon-gi
- Cinematography: Lee Doo-nam
- Edited by: Wang Sang-ik; Hahm Sung-won
- Music by: Kim Seong-hyeon
- Distributed by: CJ Entertainment
- Release date: July 27, 2007
- Running time: 118 minutes
- Country: South Korea
- Language: Korean
- Budget: US$10 million
- Box office: US$49.3 million

May 18 (Korean: 화려한 휴가; lit. 'Splendid Holiday') is a 2007 South Korean historical drama film directed by Kim Ji-hoon was released on 27 July 2007, starring Ahn Sung-ki, Kim Sang-kyung, Lee Yo-won and Lee Joon-gi. This movie tells about the events leading up to the Gwangju massacre in South Korea where troops fired on students.

== Synopsis ==
The film is based on the Gwangju massacre on May 18, 1980. It occurred when General Chun Doo-hwan tried to eliminate any rebels by using military force.

Min-woo (Kim Sang-kyung) leads a relatively peaceful life with his younger brother Jin-woo (Lee Joon-gi)—until the day the soldiers go on the rampage against the citizens. The citizens form a militia determined to protect their loved ones, and Min-woo finds himself in the middle of it all.

One day something unexpected happens suddenly. Innocent citizens are assaulted and even killed by martial law army armed with guns and knives.

A tear gas rolls into the theater and a college student jumps into the theater, followed by a soldier. When all the people who watched the movie came out, martial law soldiers beat up college students and beat everyone out of the theater.

Gwangju citizens, who have lost friends, lovers and family members in front of their eyes in an unjust manner, start to form a civic group centering on Heung-soo (Ahn Sung-ki), who retired officer-turned-military officer, and begin a 10-day struggle.

Meanwhile, Jin-woo is angry that his classmate was beaten to death by martial law soldiers when he was not a college student, leading his friends to take the lead in the protest. Min-woo wants to stop his younger brother Jin-woo from taking the lead in the protest. But Jin-woo couldn't stay still, and in the end, Jin-woo was shot in front of Min-woo by martial law soldiers.

The governor of South Jeolla Province shows up on a helicopter to citizens in front of the provincial government to mediate between them. The broadcast was about to withdraw martial law troops until the hour of the day, and the civilian forces believe the words and cheer. Gwangju citizens wait for the right time, but the soldiers do not withdraw at the promised time. As the national anthem is played through the speakers of the provincial government building, citizens salute with their right hand on their left chests, while soldiers sit down and prepare to shoot in a posture at the civilians, and then fire away.

== Cast ==
- Ahn Sung-ki as Park Heung-soo
- Kim Sang-kyung as Kang Min-woo
- Lee Yo-won as Park Shin-ae
- Lee Joon-gi as Kang Jin-woo
- Park Chul-min as In-bong
- Park Won-sang as Yong-dae
- Song Jae-ho as Priest Kim
- Na Moon-hee as Naju-daek
- Son Byong-ho as Teacher Jung
- Baek Bong-ki as Won-ki
- Jung In-gi as Jin-chul
- Hwang Young-hee as In-bong's wife
- Lee Eol as Lieutenant Colonel Bae
- Choi Jae-hwan as Byung-jo
- Yoo Hyung-kwan as Byung-jo's father
- Im Hyun-sung as Sang-pil
- Park Yong-soo as General Jung
- Kwon Tae-won as General Choi
- Um Hyo-sup as Captain Kim
- Kim Cheol-ki as Corporal Yoo

== Awards and nominations ==
2007 Blue Dragon Film Awards

- Nomination – Best Film
- Nomination – Best Director – Kim Ji-hoon
- Nomination – Best Actor – Kim Sang-kyung
- Nomination – Best Actress – Lee Yo-won
- Nomination – Best Supporting Actor – Park Chul-min
- Nomination – Best Screenplay – Na Hyeon
- Nomination – Best Cinematography – Lee Doo-man
- Nomination – Best Art Direction – Park Il-hyun

2007 Korea Movie Star Awards

- Best Film
- Best Director – Kim Ji-hoon
- Best Supporting Actress – Na Moon-hee
- Best Tears Award – Kim Sang-kyung

2007 Korean Film Awards

- Nomination – Best Supporting Actor – Park Chul-min
- Nomination – Best Art Direction – Park Il-hyun
- Nomination – Best Visual Effects – Kim Jong-su
- Nomination – Best Sound – Jang Gwang-su

2008 Baeksang Arts Awards

- Nomination – Best Film

2008 Grand Bell Awards

- Nomination – Best Supporting Actor – Park Chul-min

== See also ==
- Gwangju Uprising
