= List of South Korean films of 2011 =

This is a list of South Korean films that received a domestic theatrical release in 2011.

== Box office ==
The highest-grossing South Korean films released in 2011, by domestic box office gross revenue, are as follows:

Highest-grossing films released in 2011
Rank	Title	Distributor	Domestic gross
1	War of the Arrows	Lotte Cultureworks	$45,370,062
2	Sunny	CJ Entertainment	$43,915,916
3	Punch	CJ Entertainment	$31,315,588
4	Detective K: Secret of the Virtuous Widow	Showbox	$29,127,809
5	Silenced	CJ Entertainment	$28,904,897
6	Quick	CJ Entertainment	$18,659,805
7	Spellbound	CJ Entertainment	$17,888,084
8	The Front Line	Showbox	$17,853,458
9	Meet the In-Laws	Lotte Cultureworks	$15,583,032
10	The Client	Showbox	$14,463,333

== Released ==
Released	English title	Korean title	Genre	Directed by	Admission	Ref
5 January	Heartbeat	심장이 뛴다	Drama	Yoon Jae-geun	1,033,746	
13 January	Cuban Boyfriend	쿠바의 연인	Documentary	Joung Ho-hyun	4,407	
13 January	Invisible 2: Chasing The Ghost Sound	인비져블 2: 귀신 소리 찾기	Horror	You Joon-suk	408	
20 January	Be My Guest	죽이러 갑니다	Comedy	Park Soo-yeong	321	
20 January	GLove	글러브	Drama	Kang Woo-suk	1,895,026	
27 January	Battlefield Heroes	평양성	War	Lee Joon-ik	1,719,652	
27 January	Detective K	조선명탐정: 각시투구꽃의 비밀	Action	Kim Seok-yoon	4,795,442	
27 January	Night Fishing	파란만장	Drama	Park Chan-wook and Park Chan-kyong		
17 February	Children...	아이들...	Thriller	Lee Kyoo-man	1,871,490	
17 February	Late Autumn	만추 - 晚秋	Romance	Kim Tae-yong	846,560	
17 February	Late Blossom	그대를 사랑합니다	Drama	Choo Chang-min	1,648,079	
17 February	Re-encounter	혜화,동	Drama	Min Yong-geun	11,227	
17 February	Super Monkey Returns	서유기 리턴즈	Adventure	Shin Jai-ho	12,843	
17 February	The Final Tundra	최후의 툰드라 (극장판)	Documentary	Jang Kyeong-soo and Kim Jong-il	10,672	
24 February	Nice Shorts! 2011	촌철살인	Drama	five directors	320	
24 February	The Showdown	혈투	Historical Fiction	Park Hoon-jung	44,102	
3 March	Bleak Night	파수꾼	Drama	Yoon Sung-hyun	20,954	
3 March	Come Rain, Come Shine	사랑한다, 사랑하지 않는다	Drama	Lee Yoon-ki	66,472	
3 March	Goodbye, Pyeongyang	굿바이, 평양	Documentary	Yang Yong-hi	2,977	
3 March	Jungle Fish 2	정글 피쉬 2 (극장판)	Drama	Kim Jeong-hwan and Min Doo-sik	335	
7 March	The Age of Twenty-nine	스물아홉살	Drama	Jeon Hwa-seong	166	
10 March	Animal Town	애니멀 타운	Drama	Jeon Kyu-hwan	1,365	
10 March	Drifting Away	꼭 껴안고 눈물 핑	Drama	Kim Dong-won	614	
10 March	Shotgun Love	사랑이 무서워	Romance	Jeong Woo-cheol	404,257	
17 March	Dooman River	두만강	Drama	Zhang Lu (China)	2,361	
17 March	End of Animal	짐승의 끝	Fantasy	Jo Sung-hee	1,096	
17 March	Hanji	달빛 길어올리기	Drama	Im Kwon-taek	57,309	
17 March	Short! Short! Short! 2010	환상극장	Fantasy	four directors	273	
17 March	The Depths	심도	Drama	Ryusuke Hamaguchi (Japan)	74	
17 March	The House	집	Animation	five directors	81	
24 March	My Black Mini Dress	마이 블랙 미니드레스	Drama	Heo In-moo	316,218	
24 March	Rolling Stars: The Greatest Space Baseball Competition	지구대표 롤링 스타즈	Animation	Lim Sang-joon	35,584	
24 March	Romantic Heaven	로맨틱 헤븐	Drama	Jang Jin	73,983	
24 March	Tears of Africa	아프리카의 눈물 (극장판)	Documentary	Han Hak-soo and Jang Hyeong-won	3,824	
31 March	Meet the In-Laws	위험한 상견례	Romance, Comedy	Kim Jin-young	2,602,603	
31 March	Mother Is a Whore	엄마는 창녀다	Drama	Lee Sang-woo	525	
7 April	Calling 3: Himalayan Schweitzer	소명3: 히말라야의 슈바이처	Documentary	Shin Hyeon-won	31,865	
7 April	Sin of a Family	우리 이웃의 범죄	Thriller	Min Byeong-jin	4,223	
7 April	The Way Back	돌아오는 길	Drama	Steve Lee	164	
14 April	Beautiful Legacy	아름다운 유산	Drama	Kim Chang-man	678	
14 April	Funny Neighbors	수상한 이웃들	Drama	Yang Young-chul	2,487	
14 April	I Am a Dad	나는 아빠다	Action	Jeon Man-bae and Lee Se-yeong	168,704	
14 April	The Suicide Forecast	수상한 고객들	Comedy	Jo Jin-mo	1,062,617	
14 April	The Journals of Musan	무산일기	Drama	Park Jung-bum	11,281	
21 April	Fool	바보야	Documentary	Kang Seong-ok	17,108	
21 April	The Last Blossom	세상에서 가장 아름다운 이별	Drama	Min Kyu-dong	318,629	
27 April	In Love and the War	적과의 동침	War/Romance	Park Keon-hong	243,755	
28 April	If You Were Me 5	시선 너머	Drama	five directors	1,823	
3 May	Dream Affection	몽정애	Drama	Lee Soong-hwan		
4 May	Officer of the Year	체포왕	Comedy, Action	Lim Chan-ik	872,449	
4 May	Sunny	써니	Drama, Comedy	Kang Hyeong-cheol	7,372,055	
12 May	Empty Fullness	법정 스님의 의자	Documentary	Lim Seong-goo	9,387	
12 May	No Name Stars	오월愛	Documentary	Kim Tae-il	4,104	
19 May	Father's Love	회초리	Drama	Park Kwang-woo	74,801	
26 May	Head	헤드	Thriller, Action	Cho Un	61,626	
26 May	Sorry, Thanks	미안해, 고마워	Drama	four directors	10,203	
1 June	Mama	마마	Drama	Choi Ik-hwan	243,457	
2 June	Boy	굿바이 보이	Drama	Roh Hong-jin	3,054	
2 June	Katuri - A Story of a Mother Bird	엄마 까투리	Animation	Jung Gil-hoon	18,719	
2 June	Miracle on Jongno Street	종로의 기적	Documentary	Lee Hyuk-sang	6,443	
2 June	The True-taste Show	트루맛쇼	Documentary	Kim Jae-hwan	12,434	
9 June	A Time to Love	애정만세	Romance	Boo Ji-young and Yang Ik-june	3,893	
9 June	Moby Dick	모비딕	Thriller	Park In-je	431,978	
9 June	The Story of My Life	멋진 인생	Musical	Shin Chun-soo	3,095	
9 June	White: The Melody of the Curse	화이트: 저주의 멜로디	Horror	Kim Gok and Kim Sun	792,208	
23 June	Green Days: Dinosaur and I	소중한 날의 꿈	Animation	Ahn Jae-hoon and Han Hye-jin		
23 June	Play	플레이	Drama	Nam Da-jeong	12,548	
23 June	Poongsan	풍산개	Drama	Juhn Jai-hong	714,746	
30 June	Dr. Jump	도약선생	Comedy	Yoon Seong-ho	2,262	
7 July	The Cat	고양이: 죽음을 보는 두 개의 눈	Horror	Byeon Seung-wook	673,152	
7 July	Winter Butterfly	겨울나비	Drama	Kim Gyoo-min	635	
14 July	The Last Liaison	마지막 밀애	Drama	Lee Soong-hwan		
20 July	Quick	퀵	Action	Jo Bum-gu	3,129,225	
20 July	The Front Line	고지전	Drama, Action	Jang Hoon	2,949,198	
27 July	Leafie, A Hen Into The Wild	마당을 나온 암탉	Animation	Oh Seong-yoon		
28 July	Link	링크	Thriller	Woody Han	860	
28 July	My Heart Beats	심장이 뛰네	Drama	Huh Eunhee	879	
28 July	The Beast	짐승	Thriller, Action	Hwang Yoo-sik	614	
4 August	Ghastly	기생령	Horror	Ko Seok-jin	97,100	
4 August	Sector 7	7광구	Action	Kim Ji-hoon		
10 August	War of the Arrows	최종병기 활	Historical	Kim Han-min		
10 August	Blind	블라인드	Thriller	Ahn Sang-hoon	2,363,154	
18 August	Fantastic Modern Gayagumer	환타스틱 모던가야그머	Documentary	Choi Seung-ho	754	
18 August	Hong Gil-dong 2084	홍길동 2084	Animation	Lee Jeong-in	4,347	
18 August	Winter Smells	겨울냄새	Documentary	Jeon Hwa-seong	656	
25 August	Invasion of Alien Bikini	에얼리언 비키니	Comedy	Oh Young-doo	1,101	
25 August	Nostalgia	어이그 저 귓것	Drama	O Muel	737	
25 August	Pong Ddol	뽕똘	Comedy	O Muel		
25 August	Hindsight	푸른 소금	Film noir	Lee Hyun-seung	769,188	
1 September	About Alcohol	술에 대하여 (극장판)	Documentary	Jo Seung-won and Fan Lin (China)		
1 September	Dance Town	댄스 타운	Drama	Jeon Kyu-hwan	512	
1 September	Dream Factory	꿈의 공장	Documentary	Kim Sung-kyun	912	
1 September	Elbowroom	숨	Drama	Ham Kyoung-rock		
1 September	Themselves	바다	Drama	Yoon Tae-sik	1,242	
3 September	Share The Vision	쉐어 더 비전	Drama	Yang Yun-ho		
7 September	Champ	챔프	Drama	Lee Hwan-gyeong		
7 September	Marrying the Mafia IV	가문의 영광 4 - 가문의 수난	Comedy	Jeong Tae-won	2,370,075	
7 September	Pained	통증	Melodrama	Kwak Kyung-taek	700,727	
8 September	The Day He Arrives	북촌 방향	Drama	Hong Sang-soo		
15 September	Mozart Town	모차르트 타운	Drama	Jeon Kyu-hwan	455	
22 September	Miracle	고래를 찾는 자전거	Drama	Kim Yeong-ro	9,488	
22 September	The Crucible	도가니	Drama	Hwang Dong-hyuk		
29 September	Countdown	카운트다운	Action	Heo Jong-ho		
29 September	Hi, Dokdo	독도야 반갑다	Documentary	Kang Tae-won	206	
29 September	Ordinary Days	평범한 날들	Omnibus	Inan		
29 September	The Client	의뢰인	Thriller	Son Young-sung		
6 October	Pitch High	투혼	Drama	Kim Sang-jin	212,641	
8 October	Ashamed	창피해	Drama	Kim Soo-hyeon		
13 October	HIT	히트	Action, Comedy	Lee Seong-han		
13 October	Scars	흉터	Drama	Lim Woo-seong		
20 October	Punch	완득이	Drama	Lee Han	5,310,838	
20 October	Always	오직 그대만	Melodrama	Song Il-gon		
10 November	You're My Pet	너는 펫	Romance, Comedy	Kim Byeong-kon		
1 December	Spellbound	오싹한 연애	Horror, Romance, Comedy	Hwang In-ho		

== See also ==
- 2011 in South Korea
- 2011 in South Korean music
- List of 2011 box office number-one films in South Korea
