= List of 2011 box office number-one films in South Korea =

This is a list of films which placed number-one at the South Korean box office during 2011, based on admissions.

== Number-one films ==
†	This implies the highest-grossing movie of the year.

Weekend End Date	Film title	Weekend Admissions	Ref.
2 January	The Last Godfather	946,992	
9 January	The Last Godfather	406,440	
16 January	Megamind	313,336	
23 January	Glove	473,225	
30 January	Detective K	641,760	
6 February	Detective K	1,107,805	
13 February	Detective K	508,051	
20 February	Children	524,129	
27 February	Children	337,170	
6 March	Black Swan	289,797	
13 March	Battle: Los Angeles	454,027	
20 March	Battle: Los Angeles	254,624	
27 March	The King's Speech	173,235	
3 April	Meet the In-Laws	485,098	
10 April	Meet the In-Laws	453,294	
17 April	Suicide Forecast	282,536	
24 April	Fast Five	398,424	
1 May	Thor	548,147	
8 May	Sunny	338,254	
15 May	Sunny	618,265	
22 May	Pirates of the Caribbean: On Stranger Tides	1,244,684	
29 May	Kung Fu Panda 2	1,538,551	
5 June	Kung Fu Panda 2	902,164	
12 June	Kung Fu Panda 2	535,184	
19 June	Kung Fu Panda 2	279,168	
26 June	Sunny	332,055	
3 July	Transformers: Dark of the Moon †	2,366,170	
10 July	Transformers: Dark of the Moon †	1,676,957	
17 July	Harry Potter and the Deathly Hallows – Part 2	1,301,301	
24 July	Harry Potter and the Deathly Hallows – Part 2	719,401	
31 July	The Front Line	478,545	
7 August	Sector 7	1,160,483	
14 August	War of the Arrows	1,022,852	
21 August	War of the Arrows	894,594	
28 August	War of the Arrows	712,812	
4 September	War of the Arrows	420,768	
11 September	Marrying the Mafia IV	600,647	
18 September	War of the Arrows	328,569	
25 September	The Crucible	766,892	
2 October	The Crucible	1,023,850	
9 October	The Crucible	499,886	
16 October	Real Steel	600,416	
23 October	Punch	516,321	
30 October	Punch	667,496	
6 November	Punch	699,514	
13 November	Punch	576,476	
20 November	Punch	451,225	
27 November	S.I.U.	360,047	
4 December	The Twilight Saga: Breaking Dawn – Part 1	482,401	
11 December	Spellbound	605,899	
18 December	Mission: Impossible – Ghost Protocol	1,467,158	
25 December	Mission: Impossible – Ghost Protocol	1,245,965	

== Highest-grossing films ==
Highest-grossing films of 2011 (by admissions)
Rank	Title	Country	Admissions	Domestic gross
1.	Transformers: Dark of the Moon	United States	7,784,743	US$65.6 million
2.	War of the Arrows	South Korea	7,470,633	US$48.9 million
3.	Sunny	South Korea	7,362,657	US$47.3 million
4.	Punch	South Korea	5,309,928	US$33.8 million
5.	Kung Fu Panda 2	United States	5,062,720	US$38.8 million
6.	Mission: Impossible – Ghost Protocol	United States	4,975,161	US$33.1 million
7.	Detective K: Secret of the Virtuous Widow	South Korea	4,786,259	US$31.4 million
8.	The Crucible	South Korea	4,662,822	US$31.2 million
9.	Harry Potter and the Deathly Hallows – Part 2	United Kingdom; United States	4,400,270	US$30.2 million
10.	Real Steel	United States	3,579,666	US$23.3 million

Highest-grossing domestic films of 2011 (by admissions)
Rank	Title	Admissions	Domestic gross
1.	War of the Arrows	7,470,633	US$48.9 million
2.	Sunny	7,362,657	US$47.3 million
3.	Punch	5,309,928	US$33.8 million
4.	Detective K: Secret of the Virtuous Widow	4,786,259	US$31.4 million
5.	The Crucible	4,662,822	US$31.2 million
6.	Quick	3,125,069	US$20.1 million
7.	The Front Line	2,945,137	US$19.2 million
8.	Spellbound	2,777,998	US$17.8 million
9.	Meet the In-Laws	2,595,625	US$16.8 million
10.	The Client	2,393,086	US$15.6 million

== See also ==
- List of South Korean films of 2011
