= Detective K: Secret of the Lost Island =

- Theatrical poster
- Hangul: 조선명탐정: 사라진 놉의 딸
- Hanja: 朝鮮名探偵: 사라진 놉의 딸
- RR: Joseon myeongtamjeong: sarajin nobui ttal
- MR: Chosŏn myŏngt'amjŏng: sarajin nobŭi ttal
- Directed by: Kim Sok-yun
- Written by: Lee Nam-kyu; Kim Su-jin
- Produced by: Kim Jho Gwangsoo; Lee Sun-mi
- Starring: Kim Myung-min; Oh Dal-su; Lee Yeon-hee
- Cinematography: Jang Nam-cheol
- Edited by: Im Sun-kyong
- Music by: Kim Han-jo
- Production company: Generation Blue Films
- Distributed by: Showbox/Mediaplex
- Release date: February 11, 2015
- Running time: 124 minutes
- Country: South Korea
- Languages: Korean; Japanese
- Box office: US$27.8 million

Detective K: Secret of the Lost Island (Korean: 조선명탐정: 사라진 놉의 딸; lit. "Joseon Detective: The Disappearance of the Laborer's Daughter") is a 2015 South Korean period action comedy film directed by Kim Sok-yun. It is the sequel to 2011's Detective K: Secret of the Virtuous Widow and is the 8th highest-grossing Korean film of 2015.

A sequel, titled Detective K: Secret of the Living Dead, was released on February 8, 2018.

== Synopsis ==
Set in Joseon in the year 1795, nobleman, inventor and master sleuth Kim Min and his sidekick Seo-pil investigate a silver counterfeiting ring, which may be linked to the disappearance of hundreds of girls.

== Cast ==
- Kim Myung-min as Kim Min, "Detective K"
- Oh Dal-su as Han Seo-pil
- Lee Yeon-hee as Hisako
- Jo Kwan-woo as Musician Jo
- Jung Won-joong as Senior colleague
- Lee Chae-eun as Da-hae
- Hwang Chae-won as Do-hae
- Hwang Jeong-min as Sakura
- Woo Hyun as Mr. Bang
- Choi Moo-sung as Boss
- Park Soo-young as Official request man (cameo)
- Kim Won-hae as Sato (cameo)
- Hyun Woo as Vampire (cameo)

== Box office ==
The film was released on February 11, 2015. It topped the box office on its opening weekend, earning ₩7.58 billion (US$6.90 million) from 960,000 admissions over five days. By the end of its theatrical run, it recorded 3,872,025 admissions, grossing US$27,870,580, making it the 9th highest grossing film of 2015.
