= Law School (TV series) =

2021 South Korean television series

- Promotional poster
- Hangul: 로스쿨
- RR: Roseukul
- MR: Rosŭk'ul
- Genre: Legal drama
- Created by: JTBC
- Written by: Seo In
- Directed by: Kim Seok-yoon
- Starring: Kim Myung-min; Kim Bum; Ryu Hye-young; Lee Jung-eun
- Music by: Kim Tae-seong
- Country of origin: South Korea
- Original language: Korean
- No. of episodes: 16

Production
- Executive producer: Kim Ji-youn
- Producers: Kim Seok-yoon; Choi Sai-rack
- Running time: 70 minutes
- Production companies: JTBC Studios; Studio Phoenix; Gonggamdong House

Original release
- Network: JTBC
- Release: April 14 – June 9, 2021

Law School (Korean: 로스쿨; RR: Roseukul) is a South Korean television series starring Kim Myung-min, Kim Bum, Ryu Hye-young, and Lee Jung-eun. It premiered on JTBC on April 14, 2021 and aired every Wednesday and Thursday at 21:00 KST. The episodes are available for streaming on Netflix.

== Synopsis ==
Set in Hankuk University Law School, the series tells the story of students and professors who come across an unusual case. A professor at a prestigious law school and his students get involved in an unprecedented case. It is a drama about the process of prospective lawyers understanding authenticity, law, and justice.

During a supervised mock trial class, Professor Seo of the law school is found dead at the school, and Professor Yang is arrested as the main suspect. Kang Sol, Han Joon-Hwi, and other students at Hankuk work together to reveal the truth behind Professor Seo's death, and prove Professor Yang's innocence.

== Cast ==
=== Main ===
- Kim Myung-min as Yang Jong-hoon, a prosecutor-turned-professor who teaches criminal law. He is stern and cold, but people close to him know how kind he really is.
- Kim Bum as Han Joon-hwi, a first-year student who always gets the top grades among his peers. He is a smart student who is also the nephew of the murdered professor.
  - An Seong-won as young Joon-hwi
- Ryu Hye-young as Kang Sol A, a first-year student who entered law school through special admission. She was barely able to get into law school and is Ye-Seul's good friend. She also is the twin sister of Erica Shin.
- Lee Jung-eun as Kim Eun-sook, a judge-turned-professor who teaches civil law. She is a 'fun to be with' professor who is liked by her students. She is a good friend of Professor Yang, and tries her best to prove him innocent.

=== Supporting ===
==== Hankuk University Law School Faculty ====
- Ahn Nae-sang as Seo Byung-ju
- Gil Hae-yeon as Oh Jung-hee
- Woo Hyun as Sung Dong-il
- Oh Man-seok as Kang Ju-man
- Lee Seung-hun as Jung Dae-hyeon

==== Hankuk University Law School Students ====
- Lee Soo-kyung as Kang Sol B, a first-year student. She is Kang Sol A's roommate. She belongs to a rich family and is continuously pressured by her mother to perform well and get to the top.
- Lee David as Seo Ji-ho. He is a smart yet indifferent student who is trying to get revenge for his father's death.
- Go Youn-jung as Jeon Ye-seul, a first-year student. She is abused by her boyfriend, who is Assemblyman Ko's son as well.
- Hyun Woo as Yoo Seung-jae, a former medical student who turned to law school. He always scored the best marks until a secret of his is revealed.
- Lee Kang-ji as Min Bok-gi
- Kim Min-seok as Jo Ye-beom

==== Prosecutors' Office ====
- Park Hyuk-kwon as Jin Hyeong-u
- Kim Yong-joon as Chief Prosecutor Kim
- Min Dae-shik

==== Kang Sol A's Family ====
- Shin Mi-young as Kang Sol A's mother
- Park So-yi as Kang Byeol, Kang Sol A's younger sister
- Ryu Hye-young as Kang Dan / Erica Shin, Sol A's twin sister who has a secret story. She decided to move to Boston, USA.

=== Others ===
- Jung Won-joong as Assemblyman Ko Hyeong-su
- Jo Jae-ryong as Lee Man-ho
- Lee Hwi-jong as Ko Young-chang, Ye-seul's boyfriend.
- Lee Chun-hee as Park Geun-tae
- Sung Yeo-jin as Han Joon-hwi's aunt
- Park Mi-hyeon as Han Hye-gyeong, Kang Sol B's mother
- Actor Unknown as Choi Jae-cheol

== Production ==
=== Development ===
The then network-less project was first announced by the production company Gonggamdong House in June 2018 under the working title Law School Monsters, making it South Korea's first law school television series, with Seo In (Judge vs. Judge) as the writer. JTBC acquired the broadcasting rights in the summer of 2020.

=== Casting ===
In mid-September 2020, JTBC confirmed that Kim Myung-min, Kim Bum, Ryu Hye-young, and Lee Jung-eun would star in the series.

Kim Seok-yoon, who previously collaborated with actors Kim Myung-min and Kim Bum on the Detective K film series, joined the project as the director. He is also a co-producer for the series, together with Gonggamdong House's Choi Sai-rack.

== Original soundtrack ==
Law School OST

Soundtrack album by Various artists
- Released: 2021
- Genre: Soundtrack
- Languages: Korean; English
- Labels: YG PLUS; Studio Maum C; JTBC Studio

=== Part 1 ===
Released on April 22, 2021
No.	Title	Lyrics	Music	Artist	Length
1.	"We are"	MaO	Jayins; Naiv	Lee Seung-yoon	3:23
2.	"We are" (inst.)		Jayins; Naiv		3:22
Total length:					6:45

=== Part 2 ===
Released on May 6, 2021
No.	Title	Lyrics	Music	Artist	Length
1.	"We are (Acoustic Ver.)"	MaO	Jayins; Naiv	Darin	3:27
2.	"We are (Acoustic Ver.)" (inst.)		Jayins; Naiv		3:27
Total length:					6:55

=== Part 3 ===
Released on May 20, 2021
No.	Title	Lyrics	Music	Artist	Length
1.	"X"	Choi Jung-in; Safira.K	Choi Jung-in; Jung Sung-min; Safira.K	Safira.K	2:39
2.	"X" (inst.)		Choi Jung-in; Jung Sung-min; Safira.K		2:38
Total length:					5:17

== Viewership ==
Law School : South Korea viewers per episode (millions)

Season	Episode number																Average
Season	1	2	3	4	5	6	7	8	9	10	11	12	13	14	15	16	Average
1	1.066	0.812	0.861	0.908	0.914	0.972	0.989	1.185	1.201	1.235	1.292	1.108	1.519	1.167	1.313	1.329	1.117

Source: Audience measurement performed nationwide by Nielsen Korea

Average TV viewership ratings
Ep.	Original broadcast date	Average audience share (Nielsen Korea)	
Ep.	Original broadcast date	Nationwide	Seoul
1	April 14, 2021	5.113% (4th)	5.659% (4th)
2	April 15, 2021	4.112% (5th)	4.531% (4th)
3	April 21, 2021	4.338% (5th)	4.621% (4th)
4	April 22, 2021	4.318% (5th)	4.908% (4th)
5	April 28, 2021	4.473% (4th)	4.801% (4th)
6	April 29, 2021	4.676% (4th)	5.345% (4th)
7	May 5, 2021	4.505% (4th)	5.346% (4th)
8	May 6, 2021	5.388% (4th)	6.044% (3rd)
9	May 12, 2021	5.508% (4th)	5.645% (4th)
10	May 19, 2021	5.652% (4th)	6.547%(3rd)
11	May 20, 2021	6.249% (4th)	6.796% (4th)
12	May 26, 2021	5.550% (4th)	6.005% (3rd)
13	May 27, 2021	6.891% (3rd)	7.702% (3rd)
14	June 2, 2021	5.694% (4th)	6.241% (3rd)
15	June 3, 2021	6.309% (4th)	6.723% (3rd)
16	June 9, 2021	6.114% (5th)	6.523% (5th)
Average		5.306%	5.840%
In the table above, the blue numbers represent the lowest ratings and the red numbers represent the highest ratings.; This drama airs on a cable channel/pay TV which normally has a relatively smaller audience compared to free-to-air TV/public broadcasters (KBS, SBS, MBC and EBS).; No episode aired on May 13, 2021 due to the broadcast of the 57th Baeksang Arts Awards.
