= Detective K: Secret of the Living Dead =

- Theatrical poster
- Hangul: 조선명탐정: 흡혈괴마의 비밀
- RR: Joseon myeongtamjeong: heuphyeol goemaui bimil
- MR: Chosŏn myŏngt'amjŏng: hŭphyŏl koemaŭi pimil
- Directed by: Kim Sok-yun
- Screenplay by: Lee Nam-kyu; Jo Eun-i; Han Jeung-ae
- Based on: The Banggakbon Murder Case by Kim Tak-hwan
- Produced by: Ahn Mong-sik; Lee Seon-mi
- Starring: Kim Myung-min; Oh Dal-su; Kim Ji-won; Kim Bum
- Cinematography: Jang Nam-cheol
- Edited by: Shin Min-kyung
- Music by: Kim Wu-cheol
- Production company: Generation Blue Films
- Distributed by: Showbox
- Release date: February 8, 2018
- Running time: 120 minutes
- Country: South Korea
- Language: Korean
- Box office: US$18.6 million

Detective K: Secret of the Living Dead (Korean: 조선명탐정: 흡혈괴마의 비밀) is a 2018 South Korean period action comedy film directed by Kim Sok-yun, starring Kim Myung-min, Oh Dal-su, Kim Ji-won and Kim Bum. It is the third installment of the Detective K series and the sequel to Detective K: Secret of the Lost Island (2015).

== Plot ==
Set in the 18th century Joseon, at the period of time where complicated political situation exists under King Jeongjo, Kim Min (famously known as Detective K) and Seo-pil team up with a beautiful vampire who has amnesia, and they discover vampire bite marks on bodies. As they investigate further, they begin to realize that the vampire is somehow closely connected to the deaths. When the truth was revealed, it is known that the beautiful vampire was once a human, specifically is the Crown Princess of the past Crown Prince. The Crown Prince was murdered during a revolt set by a group of traitor which involved Kim Min's father. In order to cover up their treason, the put the blame on the Crown Prince's loyal henchman, Jeong In-yul (Lee Min-ki) and his father. He swore to take revenge on the traitors by killing their precious persons.

== Cast ==
- Kim Myung-min as Detective K / Kim Min
- Oh Dal-su as Seo-pil
- Kim Ji-won as Wol-young
- Kim Bum as Cheon-moo
- Park Geun-hyung as Kim Shin
  - Yoon Sang-hoon as young Kim Shin
- Woo Hyun as Mr. Bang
- Kim Jung-hwa as Choi Jae-hee
- Chang Ryul as Choi Jae-kyung

=== Special appearance ===
- Lee Min-ki as Jeong In-yul
- Ahn Nae-sang as Bang Hyo-In
- Nam Seong-jin as the current King of Joseon
- Hyun Woo as Crown Prince

== Critical response ==
Yoon Min-sik of The Korea Herald reviewed the film as "formulaic, funny, but not super-fun"; calling the action and CG is weak and the writing to be "clumsy". However, Kim and Oh's chemistry was praised.
