= Kim Myung-min =

South Korean actor (born 1972)

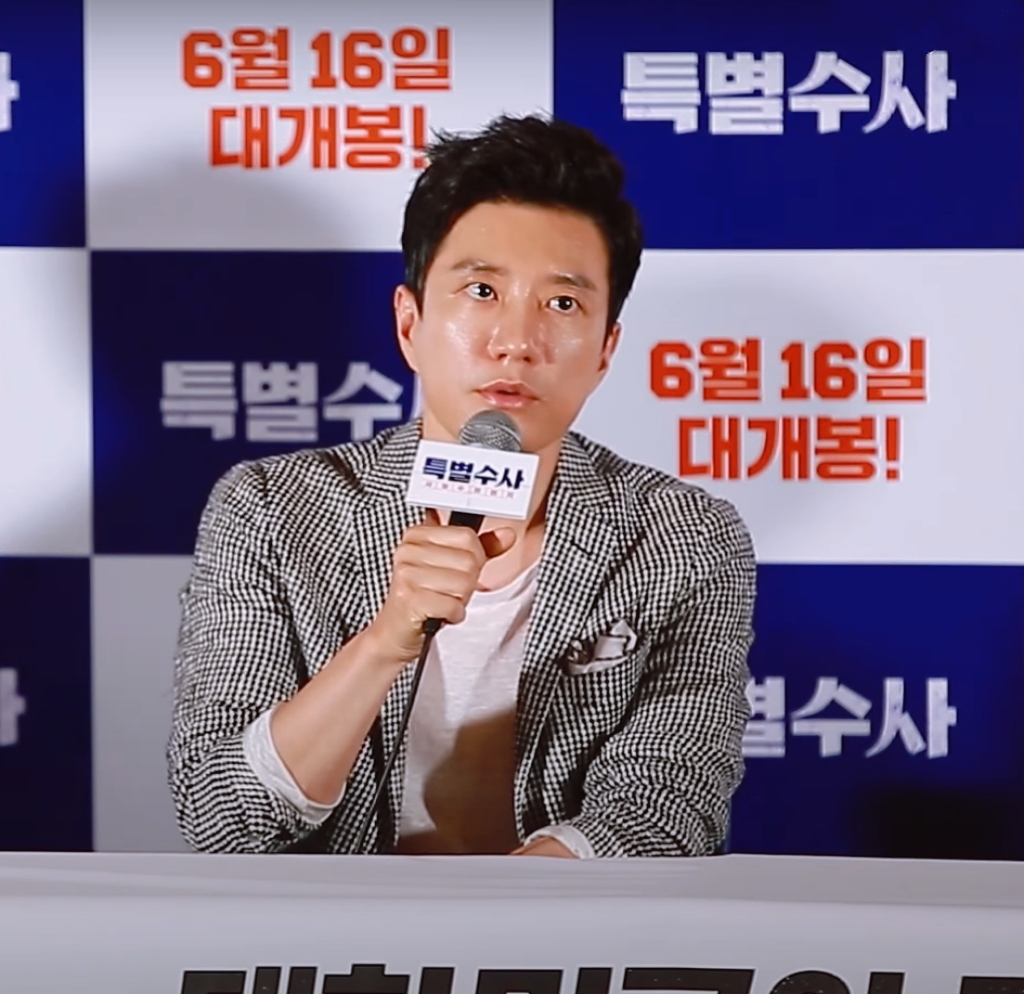
- Kim in May 2016
- Born: 8 October 1972 (age 54); Susaek-dong, Eunpyeong District, Seoul, South Korea
- Education: Seoul Institute of the Arts - Theater
- Occupation: Actor
- Years active: 1996–present

Korean name
- Hangul: 김명민
- Hanja: 金明民
- RR: Gim Myeongmin
- MR: Kim Myŏngmin

Kim Myung-min (Korean: 김명민, born October 8, 1972) is a South Korean actor. He is best known for his leading roles in the television series Immortal Admiral Yi Sun-sin (2004), White Tower (2007), Beethoven Virus (2008), Six Flying Dragons (2015–2016), and Law School (2021), as well as the films Closer to Heaven (2009) and the Detective K film series. Praised for his acting skills, he is often called "The Acting Expert".

== Career ==
=== Early years ===
Kim Myung-min debuted as an actor when he won the 6th SBS public talent audition in 1996. Over the next five years he appeared in a number of television series in various supporting roles.

Kim' first leading role came with critically appraised 2001 horror film Sorum, the feature debut of the director Yoon Jong-chan, telling the story of a taxi driver moving into a decrepit building that hides several dark secrets. For this part Kim received Best New Actor award at 2001 Busan Film Critics Awards and Director's Cut Awards

Building on his new status of a lead actor, Kim started to work on several film projects, many of which however ended unfinished, mostly due to financial problems. At that time he also suffered from injuries incurred while he was shooting action scenes.

When he starred in the 2004 KBS family drama More Beautiful than a Flower, he was expected to have a successful career as a lead actor. However, he was badly injured while performing a stunt and his film contracts kept being withdrawn. This series of unfortunate events led him to quit stage acting in 2004. Kim then decided to end his acting career and emigrate to New Zealand with his family following the birth of his son. A turning point came in his career when he was given the opportunity to play the lead role in the 2004-2005 historical drama Immortal Admiral Yi Sun-sin after producers viewed his work in More Beautiful than a Flower. The 104-episode TV series based on the life of Korea's hero of the Imjin War put Kim in the spotlight and brought him a host of awards including Grand Prize at KBS Drama Awards.

=== Mainstream success ===
Kim was then cast in leading roles, playing a comical ex-gangster in Bad Family and a detective in Open City. He then played a surgeon in two productions: the television series White Tower and film Wide Awake. White Tower was a critical and ratings hit in South Korea, gaining praise for its acting (particularly by Kim), writing, direction, and its intelligent and uncompromising story without concessions to melodrama or romance. Kim won the Best Actor awards at the year-end Baeksang Arts Awards and Grimae Awards, and was chosen as the Best Performer of the year by producers.

Subsequently, his performance as a maestro in the 2008 TV series Beethoven Virus created a sensation in Korea referred to as "Kang Mae Syndrome" and again earned him acclaim from critics and viewers. Kim received the Grand Prize (Daesang) at the MBC Drama Awards and his second Baeksang for Best Actor in television. In late 2008, it was announced that his next project was a film about a character living with Lou Gehrig's disease, titled Closer to Heaven. To realistically portray the role of the dying patient, Kim painstakingly lost 20 kilos during the course of the filming. Kim was widely commended for this feat, and won Best Actor Awards in Korea's leading film ceremonies, the 46th Grand Bell Awards and the 30th Blue Dragon Film Awards. Closer to Heaven was followed by another film, Man of Vendetta, where Kim portrayed the role of a father for the first time.

In January 2011, Kim took on the role of Joseon's Sherlock Holmes in historical comedy-mystery film Detective K: Secret of the Virtuous Widow. He then starred in sports movie, Pacemaker, where he played a marathon runner. Summer of 2012 saw Kim as a pharmaceutical agent in disaster movie Deranged. The film, directed by Park Jung-woo became the fastest Korean film in 2012 to reach 2 million admissions, eight days after its July 5 release date. and topped the box office for three consecutive weeks. Kim then starred in The Spies, his second collaboration with Woo Min-ho, director of his 2010 film, Man of Vendetta. The film is centered on a North Korean agent and his three comrades who are working undercover in South Korea.

Kim made a comeback to the small screen after four years in satire dramedy The King of Dramas, where he played a drama production company CEO. He next played a brilliant but cynical lawyer who gets into an accident and loses his memory in A New Leaf (2014). In 2015, Kim reprised his role as Detective K in Detective K: Secret of the Lost Island, the second installment in the Detective K series. The historical television series Six Flying Dragons followed, in which he played Jeong Do-jeon, who served as the first prime minister of the Joseon dynasty. He next starred in the disaster film Pandora, portraying the aftermath of an explosion in a nuclear plant. Crime drama Proof of Innocence followed, where Kim played a former cop-turned-legal broker.

In 2017, Kim starred in the noir film V.I.P, playing a police detective, followed by mystery thriller A Day. The same year, he was cast in the period comedy film Monstrum. In 2018, Kim again reprised his role as Detective K in Detective K: Secret of the Living Dead, the third installment in the Detective K series. The same year, he returned to the small screen in the melodrama The Miracle We Met. which won him another Grand Prize at the KBS Drama Awards. In 2019, Kim starred in the war film The Battle of Jangsari. In 2021, he starred in the legal drama series Law School playing a prosecutor-turned-professor who teaches criminal law. In 2022, it was reported that the contract with agency C-JeS Entertainment Kim's has expired. Later the same day it was confirmed that the original agency contract had expired.

== Filmography ==
=== Film ===
Year	Title	Role	Notes
2001	Sorum	Yong-hyun	
2003	Into the Mirror	Ha Hyun-su	
2007	Return	Ryu Jae-woo	
2008	Open City	Jo Dae-yeong	
2009	Closer to Heaven	Baek Jong-woo	
2010	Man of Vendetta	Joo Young-soo	
2011	Detective K: Secret of the Virtuous Widow	Kim Min "Detective K"	
2011	Pacemaker	Joo Man-ho	
2012	Deranged	Jae-hyuk	
2012	The Spies	Section Chief Kim	
2015	Detective K: Secret of the Lost Island	Kim Min "Detective K"	
2016	The Great Actor	Rival	Cameo
2016	Proof of Innocence	Choi Pil-jae	
2016	Pandora	Seok-ko Hang	Cameo
2017	A Day	Kim Joon-young	
2017	V.I.P.	Chae Yi-do	
2018	Detective K: Secret of the Living Dead	Kim Min ("Detective K")	
2018	Monstrum	Yoon-gyeom	
2019	The Battle of Jangsari	Lee Myung-joon	
2025	Tristes Tropiques	Master	

=== Television series ===
Year	Title	Role
1999	KAIST	Kim Hyun-moo
2000	Some Like it Hot	Choi Jin-sang
2000	Look Back in Anger	Kim Suk-gyu
2001	A Father and a Son	Jae-doo
2004	More Beautiful Than a Flower	Jang In-chul
2004	Immortal Admiral Yi Sun-sin	Yi Sun-sin
2006	Bad Family	Oh Dal-geon
2007	Behind the White Tower	Jang Joon-hyuk
2008	Beethoven Virus	Kang Gun-woo / Kang Mae
2012	The King of Dramas	Anthony Kim
2014	A New Leaf	Kim Seok-joo
2015–16	Six Flying Dragons	"Sambong" Jeong Do-jeon
2018	The Miracle We Met	Song Hyun-chul (A)
2021	Law School	Yang Jong-hoon
2024	Your Honor	Kim Kang-heon
TBA	Double Spy	Bong Tae-il

=== Music video appearances ===
Year	Song title	Artist
1999	"Blue"	Lee Kyung-sub
2001	"Landscape"	Lee Jung-bong

== Discography ==
Year	Title
2009	Kim Myung-min Classics Maestro

== Ambassadorship ==
- 2010 Seoul National University Bundang Hospital Goodwill Ambassador
- 2009 Korea Dental Association, "Ambassador for Oral Hygiene"
- 2008 Kia Soul CUV
- 2007 Oral Health Care Campaign, "OQ Publicity Ambassador"
- 2007 National Election Commission, "Clean Election Publicity Ambassador"
- 2007 Yeon-se Severance Health Publicity Ambassador
- 2006 National Pension Service
- 2005 Social Welfare Society
- 2005 The Great Admiral Lee Soon-shin Festival

== Awards and nominations ==
Year	Award	Category	Nominated work	Result	Ref.
2000	MBC Drama Awards	Best New Actor	Some Like It Hot	Won	
2001	2nd Busan Film Critics Awards	Best New Actor	Sorum	Won	
2001	4th Director's Cut Awards	Best New Actor	Sorum	Won	
2001	22nd Blue Dragon Film Awards	Best New Actor	Sorum	Nominated	
2002	38th Baeksang Arts Awards	Best New Actor – Film	Sorum	Nominated	
2004	KBS Drama Awards	Excellence Award, Actor	More Beautiful Than a Flower	Nominated	
2005	41st Baeksang Arts Awards	Best Actor – Television	Immortal Admiral Yi Sun-sin	Nominated	
2005	18th Grimae Awards	Best Actor	Immortal Admiral Yi Sun-sin	Won	
2005	KBS Drama Awards	Grand Prize (Daesang)	Immortal Admiral Yi Sun-sin	Won	
2005	KBS Drama Awards	Top Excellence Award, Actor	Immortal Admiral Yi Sun-sin	Nominated	
2005	6th Korea Visual Arts Festival	Photogenic Award in a Television	Immortal Admiral Yi Sun-sin	Won	
2006	33rd Korea Broadcasting Awards	Best Talent	Immortal Admiral Yi Sun-sin	Won	
2006	SBS Drama Awards	Top Excellence Award, Actor	Bad Family	Nominated	
2006	SBS Drama Awards	PD Award	Bad Family	Won	
2006	SBS Drama Awards	Fighting Adversity Award	Bad Family	Won	
2007	19th Korean Broadcasting Producers Award.	Best Performer	Immortal Admiral Yi Sun-sin	Won	
2007	MBC Drama Awards	Top Excellence Award, Actor	White Tower	Won	
2007	43rd Baeksang Arts Awards	Best Actor – Television	White Tower	Won	
2007	20th Grimae Awards	Best Actor	White Tower	Won	
2008	20th Korean Broadcasting Producers Award	Best Performer	White Tower	Won	
2008	MBC Drama Awards	Grand Prize (Daesang)	Beethoven Virus	Won	
2008	MBC Drama Awards	Top Excellence Award, Actor	Beethoven Virus	Nominated	
2008	9th Broadcaster Awards	Best Performance	Beethoven Virus	Won	
2008	The 2nd Korea Drama Awards	Grand Prize (Daesang)	Beethoven Virus	Won	
2008	The 2nd Korea Drama Awards	Top Excellence Award, Actor	Beethoven Virus	Nominated	
2008	4th Seoul International Drama Awards	Best Actor	Beethoven Virus	Nominated	
2009	45th Baeksang Arts Awards	Best Actor – Television	Beethoven Virus	Won	
2009	21st Korean Broadcasting Producers Award	Best Performer	Beethoven Virus	Won	
2009	36th Korea Broadcasting Association Awards	Best Actor	Beethoven Virus	Won	
2009	46th Grand Bell Awards	Best Actor	Closer to Heaven	Won	
2009	46th Grand Bell Awards	Popularity Award, Actor	Closer to Heaven	Won	
2009	30th Blue Dragon Film Awards	Best Actor	Closer to Heaven	Won	
2010	7th Max Movie Awards	Best Actor	Closer to Heaven	Nominated	
2011	20th Buil Film Awards	Best Actor	Detective K: Secret of the Virtuous Widow	Nominated	
2012	49th Grand Bell Awards	Best Actor	Pacemaker	Nominated	
2012	SBS Drama Awards	Top Excellence Award, Actor in a Miniseries	The King of Dramas	Nominated	
2014	MBC Drama Awards	Top Excellence Award, Actor in a Miniseries	A New Leaf	Nominated	
2015	Korean Film Actors Guild Awards	Top Star Award	Detective K: Secret of the Lost Island	Won	
2015	SBS Drama Awards	Top Excellence Award, Actor in a Serial Drama	Six Flying Dragons	Nominated	
2016	5th APAN Star Awards	Top Excellence Award, Actor in a Serial Drama	Six Flying Dragons	Nominated	
2018	32nd KBS Drama Awards	Grand Prize (Daesang)	The Miracle We Met	Won	
2018	32nd KBS Drama Awards	Top Excellence Award, Actor	The Miracle We Met	Nominated	
2018	32nd KBS Drama Awards	Excellence Award, Actor in a Mid-length Drama	The Miracle We Met	Nominated	
2018	32nd KBS Drama Awards	Best Couple (with Ra Mi-ran)	The Miracle We Met	Won	
2018	32nd KBS Drama Awards	Netizen Award	The Miracle We Met	Won	
2024	44th Golden Cinema Film Festival	Best Actor in Drama	Your Honor	Won	

=== Listicles ===
Name of publisher, year listed, name of listicle, and placement
Publisher	Year	Listicle	Placement	Ref.
Forbes	2010	Korea Power Celebrity	16th	
The Screen	2019	2009–2019 Top Box Office Powerhouse Actors in Korean Movies	23rd	
