= A New Leaf (TV series) =

2014 South Korean television series

- Promotional poster
- Also known as: Reformation; Repentance
- Hangul: 개과천선
- Hanja: 改過遷善
- RR: Gaegwacheonseon
- MR: Kaegwach'ŏnsŏn
- Genre: Drama; Legal drama; Romance
- Written by: Choi Hee-ra
- Directed by: Park Jae-bum; Oh Hyun-jong
- Starring: Kim Myung-min; Park Min-young; Kim Sang-joong; Chae Jung-an
- Country of origin: South Korea
- Original language: Korean
- No. of episodes: 16

Production
- Executive producer: Kim Sang-ho
- Producers: Lee Jin-seok; Park Joon-seo
- Production company: JS Pictures

Original release
- Network: MBC TV
- Release: April 30 – June 26, 2014

A New Leaf (Korean: 개과천선; RR: Gaegwacheonseon) is a 2014 South Korean television series starring Kim Myung-min, Park Min-young, Kim Sang-joong, and Chae Jung-an. It aired on MBC from April 30 to June 26, 2014 on Wednesdays and Thursdays at 21:55 for 16 episodes.

== Plot ==
Kim Seok-joo is a hotshot corporate lawyer; he is cold, successful, and a heartless shark at his job. But after he gets into an accident, Seok-joo is diagnosed with amnesia. The memory loss motivates him to discover who he really is and turn over a new leaf. While trying to recover his memory and identity, the man who in the past did not mind playing foul to succeed gets the chance to look at life, people and society from a completely different point of view. But this personality change puts him at odds with his law firm, and Seok-joo finds himself going up against his colleagues as he wages a righteous battle against social ills.

== Cast ==
=== Main characters ===
- Kim Myung-min as Kim Seok-joo

A tough, cold-hearted ace lawyer who prides himself in having a 100% winning rate because of his willingness to use any method, fair or foul, to win his cases. But after he gets into an accident and loses his memory, Seok-joo undergoes a personality shift, and has to build his life back, turning over a new leaf in the process.

- Park Min-young as Lee Ji-yoon

She comes from a poor background and worked hard to put herself through a third-rate law school, but managed to score an internship at a prestigious law firm after graduating. Ji-yoon is tactless, honest to a fault, and idealistic and unwavering when it comes to her belief in justice and the law. She knows it doesn't make her the best candidate to be a star lawyer, but she remains upbeat and firm in her beliefs. At first she has a contentious relationship with Seok-joo, but after his accident, they begin to get along and work together as a team.

- Kim Sang-joong as Cha Young-woo

The head of the law firm. Young-woo is ambitious, sharp and professional, and he expertly uses (and twists) the law in order to score the win. As a mentor and father figure, he shaped Seok-joo into the perfect protégé. Young-woo tries to help Seok-joo after the accident but finds it difficult dealing with the latter's drastic personality change, and the two later become adversaries.

- Chae Jung-an as Yoo Jung-seon

The granddaughter of a chaebol and Seok-joo's fiancée. Jung-seon and Seok-joo became engaged after being paired through an arranged marriage. So when Seok-joo wakes up with amnesia and believes that their relationship is built on love, Jung-seon finds herself pleasantly surprised and gradually learns the true meaning of love.

- Jin Yi-han as Jeon Ji-won

Ji-won is a former judge, and when he joins the law firm, the younger upstart threatens Seok-joo's place as the favored legal hotshot.

=== Supporting characters ===
- Oh Jung-se as Park Sang-tae

Seok-joo's best friend and colleague at the law firm. He's twice divorced, and constantly goes on auditions in pursuit of his real dream of becoming an idol star. He grows suspicious of Seok-joo's changed behavior after his accident.

- Choi Il-hwa as Kim Shin-il

A former judge and human rights lawyer, he is Seok-joo's father. Due to different principles, they have an estranged relationship. He hides his recent diagnosis of Alzheimer's disease from his family.

- Lee Han-wi as Team leader Kang

Seok-joo's colleague at the law firm, who is jealous and antagonistic towards him.

- Ahn Sun-young as Lee Ae-sook

Ji-yoon's aunt, who runs a restaurant.

- Lee Min-hyuk as Lee Ji-hyeok

Ji-yoon's younger brother who is an aspiring idol.

- Jung Han-yong as Kwon Jae-yoon

The chairman of Yoorim Group. He pushes his granddaughter Jung-seon into marrying Seok-joo, in order to take advantage of his legal expertise in corporate matters. His company is currently on the brink of bankruptcy.

- Kim Seo-hyung as Lee Sun-hee

The lead prosecutor in the Jung Hye-ryeong rape case.

- Kim Yoon-seo as Jung Hye-ryeong

An actress who was raped by Park Dong-hyun, and becomes the prime suspect for the latter's murder.

- Lee Jeong-heon as Park Dong-hyun

A chaebol businessman with a propensity for sexually assaulting women, then paying off his victims.

- Go In-beom as Park Ki-chul

Father of Dong-hyun, and CEO of his company. He is a client of Young-woo's firm, and is furious when Seok-joo takes Hye-ryeong's case, since he believes that she killed his son.

- Kim Young-hoon as Lee Woo-young
- Park Jung-woo as Kim Hak-tae

An ex-NIS agent who is Dong-hyun's bodyguard and fixer.

- Ki Eun-se as Seo Young-ah

A bar hostess at a nightclub. She is one of Dong-hyun's ex-girlfriends, and he paid for her to get an abortion.

- Jung Kyu-soo as Park Ho-joon
- Jung Ho-bin as Kang Eun-chan

A Minister of Justice candidate who's under fire because of a tax scandal.

- Lee Byung-joon as Jin Jin-ho
- Lee Joo-yeon as Lee Mi-ri

Ji-yoon's friend, at whose wedding Seok-joo and Ji-yoon first meet. Mi-ri previously had an affair with the husband of one of Seok-joo's clients.

- Kim Seo-kyung as law firm associate
- Kim Jung-wook as law firm associate
- Kim Ho-chang as law firm associate
- Lee Moon-jung as law firm associate
- Choi Jung-hwa as law firm employee
- Kang Ji-woo as intern
- Jung Woo-shik as intern
- Jeon Sol-rim as intern
- Song Won-geun as Lee Dong-min (guest)

Jung Hye-ryeong's boyfriend, who testifies on the witness stand on her behalf.

- Park Young-ji
- Jung Dong-gyu
- Na Kwang-hoon

== Ratings ==
Episode #	Original broadcast date	Average audience share			
Episode #	Original broadcast date	TNmS Ratings		AGB Nielsen	
Episode #	Original broadcast date	Nationwide	Seoul National Capital Area	Nationwide	Seoul National Capital Area
1	April 30, 2014	6.3%	8.3%	6.9%	7.3%
2	May 1, 2014	6.3%	9.1%	7.1%	7.6%
3	May 7, 2014	7.6%	9.8%	9.3%	10.3%
4	May 8, 2014	7.5%	9.8%	8.9%	10.4%
5	May 14, 2014	8.5%	11.0%	8.2%	9.7%
6	May 15, 2014	7.0%	8.9%	8.1%	8.6%
7	May 21, 2014	8.4%	11.0%	9.4%	10.6%
8	May 22, 2014	8.2%	10.7%	10.2%	11.4%
9	May 29, 2014	7.8%	10.4%	8.0%	8.6%
10	June 5, 2014	7.6%	9.1%	7.9%	8.9%
11	June 11, 2014	9.3%	11.9%	9.7%	10.9%
12	June 12, 2014	8.6%	11.0%	8.7%	9.4%
13	June 18, 2014	8.0%	10.6%	8.1%	8.6%
14	June 19, 2014	7.0%	9.3%	7.9%	7.6%
15	June 25, 2014	8.0%	10.8%	9.0%	10.3%
16	June 26, 2014	7.8%	9.5%	8.1%	8.8%
Average		7.7%	10.1%	8.5%	9.3%

== Awards and nominations ==
Year	Award	Category	Recipient	Result
2014	33rd MBC Drama Awards	Top Excellence Award, Actor in a Miniseries	Kim Myung-min	Nominated
2014	33rd MBC Drama Awards	Excellence Award, Actor in a Miniseries	Kim Sang-joong	Won
2014	33rd MBC Drama Awards	Excellence Award, Actress in a Miniseries	Park Min-young	Nominated

== International broadcast ==
It aired in Japan on cable channel KNTV beginning October 18, 2014. It aired in Indonesia on cable channel RTV beginning November 8, 2014.

== See also ==
Regarding Henry
