= The Great Actor =

- Directed by: Seok Min-woo
- Screenplay by: Seok Min-woo
- Produced by: Jo Sung-Hwan
- Starring: Oh Dal-su
- Distributed by: Daemyung Culture Factory, Little Big Pictures
- Release date: 30 March 2016
- Running time: 108 minutes
- Country: South Korea
- Language: Korean

The Great Actor (Korean: 대배우; RR: Daebaeu) is a 2016 South Korean film directed by Seok Min-woo and starring Oh Dal-su. It marked Oh's first starring role in a feature film.

== Plot ==
Stage actor Jang Sung-pil (Oh Dal-su) has performed in minor roles for 20 years and is currently playing the part of a dog in a children's play, but he dreams of becoming a great actor. As he watches fellow performer Sul Gang-sik (Yoon Je-moon), who used to act with him before making it big, Sung-pil believes that his dream is still possible. His hopes rise when world-famous director Cannes Park holds an audition for the character of a priest in his new film Devil's Blood. When Sung-pil is accused of being an incompetent father and husband, he claims that he will be performing in the Cannes Park movie with Sul Gang-sik. To turn his lies into truth, Sung-pil embarks on a desperate journey to stardom, using every means possible.

== Cast ==
- Oh Dal-su as Jang Sung-pil
- Yoon Je-moon as Sul Gang-sik
- Lee Geung-young as Cannes Park
- Jin Kyung as Ji-young
- Ko Woo-rim as Kang Won-suk
- Choi Byung-mo as the director
- Kang Shin-il as Dae-ho
- Kim Chul-moo as Kyung-hee
- Park Ji-hwan as Seung-ji
- Ha Ji-eun as Young-suk

== Release & Reception ==
The film opened on March 30, 2016, topping the box office among domestic films and taking third place overall, just behind American films Zootopia and Batman vs. Superman. The film received mixed reviews, with most critics praising the performances and the story's unexpected depth.
