= Wide Awake (2007 film) =

- Theatrical poster
- Hangul: 리턴
- RR: Riteon
- MR: Rit'ŏn
- Directed by: Lee Gyu-man
- Written by: Lee Gyu-man; Lee Hyun-jin
- Produced by: Gang Seong-gyu
- Starring: Kim Myung-min
- Cinematography: Kim Dong-eun
- Edited by: Steve M. Choe; Kim Chang-ju
- Music by: Choi Seung-hyun
- Distributed by: CJ Entertainment
- Release date: 8 August 2007
- Running time: 115 minutes
- Country: South Korea
- Language: Korean
- Box office: US$4,569,126

Wide Awake (Korean: 리턴; RR: Riteon), also known as Return, is a 2007 South Korean thriller film directed by Lee Gyu-man, starring Kim Myung-min in the lead role.

== Plot ==
In 1980s South Korea, a young boy is traumatised after experiencing anesthesia awareness during heart surgery, and no-one believes his story afterwards. Twenty-five years later, the doctors and nurses who operated on him begin to die under mysterious circumstances. Dr. Ryu Jae-woo, a surgeon married to Hee-jin, believes that the boy he remembers from his childhood is responsible for the deaths. The leading suspects are Lee Myeong-suk, who has been stalking Dr. Ryu, and the seemingly unhinged Uk-hwan. Hypnosis specialist Oh Chi-hoon also seems to know something about these deaths.

== Cast ==
- Kim Myung-min as Ryu Jae-woo
- Yoo Jun-sang as Kang Wook-han
- Kim Tae-woo as Oh Chi-hoon
- Jung Yoo-suk
- Kim Yoo-mi as Seo Hee-jin
- Kim Roi-ha as Lee Myeong-suk
- Baek Seung-hwan as Na Sang-woo
- Seo Young-hwa
- Lee Sung-min as Sang-woo's father

== Release ==
Wide Awake was released in South Korea on 8 August 2007, and its opening weekend was ranked fourth at the box office with 238,819 admissions. The film went on to receive a total of 677,939 admissions nationwide, with a gross (as of 16 September 2007) of US$4,569,126.

== Awards and nominations ==
2008 Grand Bell Awards

- Best Supporting Actor – Yoo Jun-sang
- Nomination – Best Music – Choi Seung-hyun
