= Seung Hyo-bin =

South Korean actress (born 1983)

- Born: Choi Eun-young; 5 December 1983 (age 42); Seoul, South Korea
- Other names: Choe Eun-yeong, Choe Eun-young
- Education: New York Film Academy (Acting & First Grade)
- Occupations: Actress; model
- Years active: 1999–present
- Agent(s): J&K Entertainment

Korean name
- Hangul: 승효빈
- RR: Seung Hyobin
- MR: Sŭng Hyobin

Seung Hyo-bin (Korean: 승효빈; born 5 December 1983) is a South Korean actress and model. She is known for roles in dramas such as Heading to the Ground, Face Me and Smile, and My Shining Girl. She has also done roles in films such as Good Morning President and Heartbeat.

== Early life and education ==
She was born on December 5, 1983, in Seoul. She completed her studies from New York Film Academy, where she studied acting.

== Career ==
She made her debut as an actress in 1999. After her debut as an actress, she has appeared in several films and television dramas, including Heading to the Ground, My Shining Girl and Face Me and Smile. She also appeared in 2NE1's music video "I Don`t Care".

== Filmography ==
=== Television series ===
Year	Title	Role	Ref.
2009	Heading to the Ground	Mi-kyeong	
2010	Face Me and Smile	Mi-ran	
2012	My Shining Girl	Lee Yoo-jin	

=== Film ===
Year	Title	Role	Language	Ref.
2009	Good Morning President	Kyeong-Ja's secretary	Korean	
2010	Step	Ahn Young-bin	Korean	
2010	Heartbeat	Jogging girl	Korean	
2011	Fish	Eun-yeong	Korean	

== Awards and nominations ==
- 2006 Miss Korea New York Beauty Award
