= One Mom and Three Dads =

- Promotional poster
- Also known as: Three Dads and One Mom; Three Dads With One Mommy; Three Dads and a Mother
- Genre: Romance; Comedy
- Written by: Jo Myung-joo
- Directed by: Lee Jae-sang; Kim Jung-gyu
- Starring: Eugene; Jo Hyun-jae; Jae Hee; Shin Sung-rok
- Country of origin: South Korea
- Original language: Korean
- No. of episodes: 16

Production
- Running time: 60 minutes
- Production companies: Kim Jong-hak Production; RaemongRaein

Original release
- Network: KBS2
- Release: 2 April – 22 May 2008

One Mom and Three Dads (Korean: 아빠셋 엄마하나; RR: Appaset eommahana) is a 2008 South Korean television series starring Eugene, Jo Hyun-jae, Jae Hee, and Shin Sung-rok. It aired on KBS2 from April 2 to May 22, 2008 on Wednesdays and Thursdays at 21:55 for 16 episodes.

== Synopsis ==
Song Na-young and her husband, Jung Sung-min desperately want a child, but Sung-min is unable to get her pregnant. Na-young suddenly loses her husband in an accident, and afterwards gives birth to a daughter. What she does not know is that three of her husband's friends donated sperm to Sung-min so that she could conceive successfully. The father of Na-young's child could either be Han Soo-hyun, Choi Kwang-hee, or Na Hwang Kyung-tae.

== Cast ==
=== Main characters ===
- Eugene as Song Na-young
- Jo Hyun-jae as Han Soo-hyun
- Jae Hee as Choi Kwang-hee
- Shin Sung-rok as Na Hwang Kyung-tae
- Kim Bin-woo as Park Seo-yeon
- Joo Sang-wook as Jung Chan-young

=== Supporting characters ===
- Yoon Sang-hyun as Jung Sung-min
- Jang Young-nam as Noh Hee-sook
- Ko Do-young as Jang Joo-mi
- Jeon So-min as Nam Jong-hee
- Lee Hee-do as Song Mong-chan (Na-young's father)
- Park Chil-yong as Han Bong-soo (Soo-hyun's father)
- Jang Jung-hee as Lee Jin-nyeo (Kwang-hee's mother)
- Yang Hee-kyung as Hwang Soon-ja (Kyung-tae's mother)
- Kim Jin-tae as Park Dae-seok (Seo-yeon's father)
- Lee Chae-eun as Na-yeong's friend
- Kim Ki-kyeon as President Jung (Chan-young's father)
