= Detective K: Secret of the Virtuous Widow =

Detective K: Secret Of Virtuous Widow
- Theatrical release poster
- Hangul: 조선명탐정: 각시투구꽃의 비밀
- Hanja: 朝鮮名探偵: 각시투구꽃의 祕密
- RR: Joseon myeongtamjeong: gaksitugukkochui bimil
- MR: Chosŏn myŏngt'amjŏng: kaksit'ugukkoch'ŭi pimil
- Directed by: Kim Sok-yun
- Written by: Lee Chun-hyeong; Lee Nam-gyu
- Based on: The Secret of the Virtuous Widow by Kim Tak-hwan
- Produced by: Kim Jho Kwang-soo; Lee Seon-mi
- Starring: Kim Myung-min; Han Ji-min; Oh Dal-su
- Cinematography: Jang Nam-cheol
- Edited by: Kim Sun-min
- Music by: Kim Han-jo; Eom Gi-yeop
- Production company: Generation Blue Films
- Distributed by: Showbox/Mediaplex
- Release date: 27 January 2011
- Running time: 115 minutes
- Country: South Korea
- Language: Korean
- Box office: US$32.3 million

Detective K: Secret of the Virtuous Widow (Korean: 조선명탐정: 각시투구꽃의 비밀) is a 2011 South Korean period action comedy film based on the novel by Kim Tak-hwan, starring Kim Myung-min in the lead role. It was the 4th highest-grossing Korean film of 2011.

== Plot ==
In 1782, 16 years after Jeongjo became the King of Joseon, a series of murders occurs. King Jeongjo believes the murders may belong to a conspiracy by government officials to cover up tributary payments. King Jeongjo then gives Detective K (Kim Myung-min) a secret order to find out who is behind the killings.

When Detective K goes to question the jailed city governor, he discovers that the governor has just been murdered. Detective K then pulls out the murder weapon: a long metal needle that is jammed into the back of the governor's head. Furthermore, Detective K discovers a clue to the murderer's identity. Remnants of the regional Wolfsbane flower are found near the long metal needle. But, while Detective K is holding the murder weapon, prison guards come into the cell and assume that Detective K murdered the city governor. Now imprisoned, Detective K awakes to find dog fancier Seo-pil (Oh Dal-su) standing over him. Seo-pil helps Detective K escape from prison.

Because of this incident, King Jeongjo demotes Detective K and reassigns him to Jeokseong to investigate the case of a woman thought to have killed herself after the death of her husband. But, this reassignment is more of a ruse for Detective K to get to Jeokseong – the area where the Wolfsbane flower blooms.

As Detective K and Seo-pil investigate in Jeokseong, they come across lady Han Kaek-ju (Han Ji-min), who works as a commission agent and controls large groups of merchants. Detective K and Seo-Pil suspect that Han Kaek-ju and the head of the Noron political party Minister Im (Lee Jae-yong) are embezzling taxes to pay off politicians. Meanwhile, Detective K also investigates the case of the woman who reportedly committed suicide after the death of her husband and comes to the conclusion that these two cases are somehow related.

== Cast ==
- Kim Myung-min as Detective K
- Han Ji-min as Han Kaek-ju
- Oh Dal-su as Han Seo-pil
- Lee Jae-yong as Minister Im
- Woo Hyeon as Mr. Bang
- Ye Soo-jung as Im's wife
- Choi Moo-sung as medical guru
- Jung In-gi as magistrate
- Lee Seol-gu as servant 4
- Choi Jae-sup as Lee Bang
- Moon Kyung-min as old blacksmith
- Kim Tae-hoon as Im Geo-seon
- Nam Sung-jin as King Jeongjo
- Yang Han-yeol as Young slave
- Lee Chae-eun as Young slave
- Kim Young-hoon as Priest

== Release ==
The film was released in South Korea on January 27, 2011. It received a theatrical run in 10 cities in the U.S. and Canada in March 2011, including Los Angeles, San Francisco, Atlanta, Seattle, Chicago, Dallas, Hawaii and Vancouver. It was also sold to Australia, China, Taiwan, Thailand, Germany, Austria, and Switzerland, and screened at the Hawaii International Film Festival.

== Sequels ==
The sequel was released in February 2015. Kim Myung-min and Oh Dal-su reprised their roles, and are joined by Lee Yeon-hee as a femme fatale.

A third film, Detective K: Secret of the Living Dead, was released on February 8, 2018.
