= Heading to the Ground =

- Promotional poster
- Genre: Sports; Comedy
- Starring: Jung Yun-ho; Go Ara; Lee Yoon-ji; Lee Sang-yoon
- Country of origin: South Korea
- Original language: Korean
- No. of episodes: 16

Production
- Production location: South Korea
- Running time: 70 minutes

Original release
- Network: MBC
- Release: September 9 – November 4, 2009

Heading to the Ground (Korean: 맨땅에 헤딩; RR: Maenttange heding), also known as No Limit, is a 2009 South Korean television series starring Jung Yun-ho, Go Ara, Lee Yoon-ji, and Lee Sang-yoon. It aired on MBC on Wednesdays to Thursdays at 21:55 for 16 episodes beginning September 9, 2009.

== Plot ==
The drama about a man trying to achieve what is thought to be impossible: fulfilling his dreams of being a great soccer player. He meets Kang Hae Bin, a sports agent who tries to live her life away from the influence of her rich father.

== Cast ==
- Jung Yun-ho as Cha Bong-gun
  - Jung Chan-woo as young Cha Bong-gun
- Go Ara as Kang Hae-bin
- Lee Yoon-ji as Oh Yeon-yi
- Lee Sang-yoon as Jang Seung-woo

=== Supporting ===
- Bang Joon-seo as Cha Byul-yi
- Park Soon-chun as Lee Soon-ok (Byul-yi's mother)
- Yoon Yeo-jung as Ae-ja
- Im Chae-moo as Kang Sung-il (Hae-bin's father)
- Lee Il-hwa as Maeng Geum-hee (Hae-bin's stepmother)
- Kim Hye-ok as (Yeon-yi's mother)
- Seung Hyo-bin as Mi-kyeong
- Park Chul-min as Hong Sang-an
- Lee Seung-shin as Han Myung-kil
- Park Hwi-soon as Young-dal
- Choi Eun-young as Mi Kyung
- Go Soo-hee as Heo Sook-hee
- Jung Joon-ha
- Im Seung-dae as team leader Moon

=== Extended ===
==== Soccer team ====
- Kim Jae-seung as Lee Dong-ho
- Lee Jae-yoon as Shin Poong-chul
- Choi Min-sung as Jo Byung-ki
- Hong Jong-hyun as Hong Kyung-rae
- Kang Shin-il as Lee Choong-ryul (coach)
- Ricky Kim as Maxim
- Yoon Won-suk as Yong-goo
- Kim Kwang-min

==== Others ====
- Yum Dong-hun as Geun-choon (cameo)
