= Gabi (film) =

Russian Coffee
- Hangul: 가비
- RR: Gabi
- MR: Kabi
- Directed by: Chang Yoon-hyun
- Screenplay by: Kim Eun-jung
- Based on: Russian Coffee by Kim Tak-hwan
- Produced by: Jung Tae-woon; Choe Jun-yeong; Lee Je-hyeon
- Starring: Kim So-yeon; Joo Jin-mo; Park Hee-soon
- Cinematography: Oh Hyun-je
- Edited by: Nam Na-yeong
- Music by: Won Il
- Production companies: Trophy Entertainment; Ksure; Cinema Service
- Distributed by: CJ Entertainment
- Release date: March 15, 2012 (South Korea)
- Running time: 115 minutes
- Country: South Korea
- Language: Korean

Gabi (Korean: 가비) is a 2012 South Korean historical mystery drama film starring Kim So-yeon, Joo Jin-mo and Park Hee-soon. It follows an ostensible assassination plot of King Gojong (1852–1919), using coffee brewed by royal barista Tanya. The plan is masterminded by Sadako, a Joseon woman with adopted Japanese nationality, and aided by Ilyich, Tanya's lover.

Inspired by conspiracy theories about Gojong and the king's well-known love of coffee, the movie's title Gabi is a turn-of-the-century Chinese-character transliteration of "coffee." The film is based on author Kim Tak-hwan's historical fiction novel Noseoa Gabi ("Russian Coffee").

== Plot ==
After his wife Empress Myeongseong is assassinated by the Japanese army and under threat of coup d'etat, Gojong the 26th king of Korea's Joseon Dynasty (Park Hee-soon) briefly seeks refuge at the Russian consulate in 1896. While he is there, he tastes and falls in love with a bittersweet drink that had yet to gain popularity in his homeland: coffee.

Upon returning to the throne, King Gojong hires the beautiful and cosmopolitan Tanya (Kim So-yeon) as his personal barista. Tanya becomes involved in a dangerous social circle that involves not only the Russian sniper Ilyich (Joo Jin-mo) but also the mysterious socialite known as both Bae Jeong-ja and Sadako (Yoo Sun). With the Russian army hot on their trail, Tanya and her lover Ilyich eventually become ensnared in a plot to assassinate King Gojong that is orchestrated by Sadako, a Korean-Japanese collaborator. Ilyich becomes a spy to protect Tanya, who has begun to fall for Gojong while she makes his coffee every day.

With her intimate connection to the King, making a drink that could easily conceal poison, Tanya must decide if she will become a pawn in the political battlefield of late 19th century Korea.

== Cast ==
- Kim So-yeon as Tanya
- Joo Jin-mo as Ilyich
- Park Hee-soon as King Gojong
- Yoo Sun as Sadako
- Jo Deok-hyeon as Seok-joo
- Jo Kyeong-hun as underling
- Kim Hyun-ah as court lady
- Kim Ga-eun as Geum-hee
- Kim Eung-soo as Miura
- Jo Seung-yeon as Min Young-hwan
- Jo Duk-je as spy
- Kim Min-hyuk as Takeda
- Hong Young-geun as Ryosuke
- Um Hyo-sup as Tanya's father

== Historical basis ==
Born into a lowly background, Kim Hong-ryuk rose up in the ranks to be appointed as an interpreter for King Gojong in the latter's dealings with the Russian minister Karl Ivanovich Weber. Eventually his political ambition proved his undoing, and he was executed for allegedly trying to poison Gojong by spiking a cup of coffee with opium.

== Casting change ==
Lee Da-hae was originally cast in the lead role of Tanya via verbal agreement, but when she dropped out of the project ten days before filming began, production company Ocean Film sued her for breach of contract. In September 2012, the court ruled in favor of the plaintiff, ordering Lee to pay ₩21 million (US$19,000) in damages, or 40% liability.

== Awards ==
- 2012 Korean Culture and Entertainment Awards: Excellence Award, Actress in a Film - Kim So-yeon
- 2014 Golden Cinema Festival: Gold Medal in Cinematography - Oh Hyun-je
