= Kim Young-hoon (actor) =

South Korean actor (born 1978)

- Born: October 2, 1978 (age 48); Yangju, Gyeonggi Province, South Korea
- Education: Seoul Institute of the Arts – Department of Theatre
- Occupation: Actor
- Years active: 1999–present
- Agent: WS Entertainment

Korean name
- Hangul: 김영훈
- RR: Gim Yeonghun
- MR: Kim Yŏnghun

Kim Young-hoon (born October 2, 1978) is a South Korean actor.

== Filmography ==
=== Film ===
Year	Title	Role
2001	Guns & Talks	Agent 3
2004	Low Life	
2004	He Was Cool	Kim Hyun-sung
2006	Art of Fighting	"white shark"
2007	Herb	Conscripted policeman 2
2008	The Moonlight of Seoul	Tae-woo (uncredited)
2009	City of Damnation	Chef camouflage worker
2009	The Scam	Secretary Nam
2009	How to Live on Earth	Member of parliament's assistant
2009	Closer to Heaven	Baek Jong-woo's friend, Kwan-young
2010	Blades of Blood	Executor
2011	Heartbeat	Chae Yeon-hee's husband
2011	Detective K: Secret of the Virtuous Widow	Priest
2011	The Showdown	Blue army 2
2011	Poongsan	Hit team 4
2011	The Beast	Jae-gyu
2011	Yeosu	
2011	My Secret Partner	Audio engineer
2012	Howling	(cameo)
2012	Home Sweet Home	Tae-soo
2012	The Weight	
2013	Good Friends	Yuuji
2014	Revivre	Section chief Jung

=== Television series ===
Year	Title	Role	Notes/Ref.
2001	Wonderful Days		
2004	New Human Market		
2006	Spring Waltz		
2009	You're Beautiful		
2010	Home Sweet Home	Assistant Kim	
2011	Detectives in Trouble	Ji Young-ho	
2011	KBS Drama Special "That Man is There"	Choi Joon-yong	one-act drama
2011	KBS Drama Special "Strawberry Ice Cream"	Kwon Ki-jung	one-act drama
2011	Kimchi Family	Oh Hae-joon	
2012	Bridal Mask	Comrade Park	
2012	The Sons	Kang Jin	
2012	KBS Drama Special "Culprit Among Friends"	Do-hyun	one-act drama
2013	That Winter, the Wind Blows	Lee Myung-ho	
2013	Ugly Alert	Lee Han-seo	
2014	A New Leaf	Lee Woo-young	
2014	You Are My Destiny	Lawyer Min Byung-chul	
2014	KBS Drama Special "Repulsive Love"	Jang Young-chul	one-act drama
2014	Pinocchio	Lee Il-joo	
2014	Drama Festival "Guitars and Hot Pants"	Seung-pil	one-act drama
2016	Yeah, That's How It Is	Na Hyun-woo	
2017	Mad Dog	Kim Bum-joon	
2019	Doctor John	Han Myeong-oh	
2020	When My Love Blooms	Lee Se-hoon	
2022	Again My Life	Kim Jin-woo	
2023	Pale Moon	Tae-min	Cameo
2023	Battle for Happiness	Lee Tae-ho	

=== Web series ===
Year	Title	Role	Ref.
2022	Remarriage & Desires	Choi Seong-jae	
