= Ryu Hye-young =

South Korean actress (born 1991)

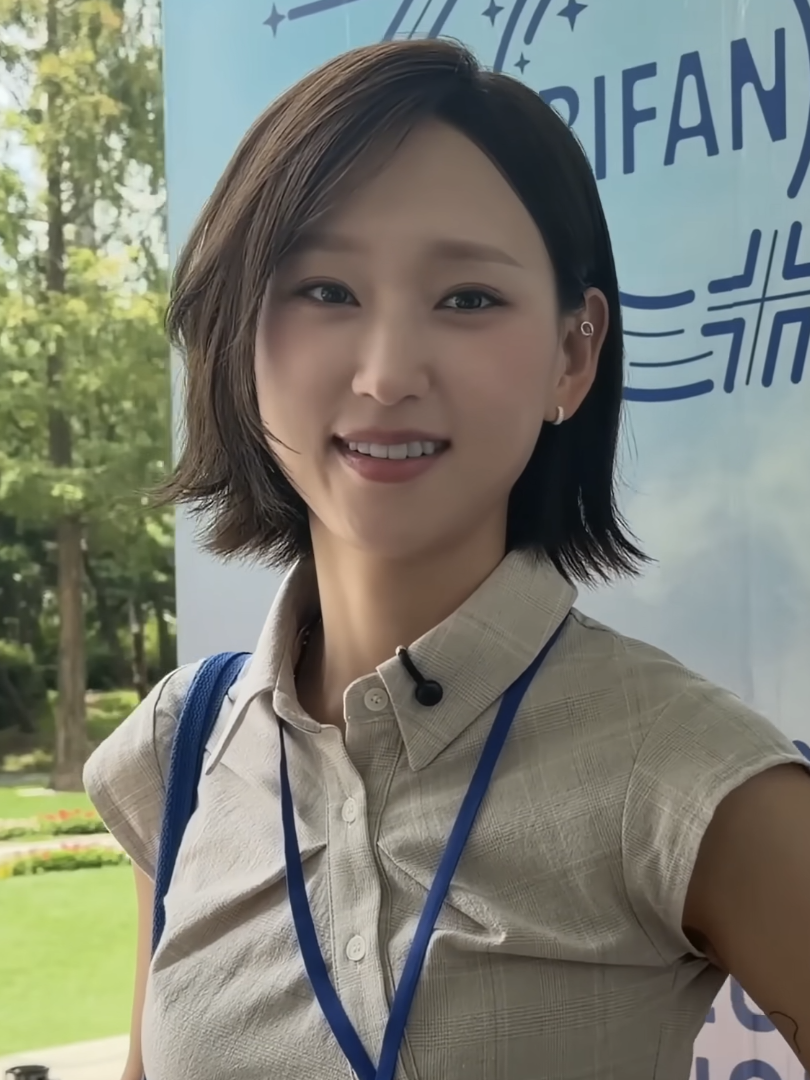
- Ryu in August 2026
- Born: March 28, 1991 (age 35); Seoul, South Korea
- Education: Konkuk University
- Occupation: Actress
- Years active: 2007–present
- Agent: VAST Entertainment
- Relatives: Ryu Abel (sister)

Korean name
- Hangul: 류혜영
- Hanja: 柳惠英
- RR: Ryu Hyeyeong
- MR: Ryu Hyeyŏng

Ryu Hye-young (Korean: 류혜영; born March 28, 1991) is a South Korean actress. She first gained attention for her roles in the feature films INGtoogi: The Battle of Internet Trolls (2013) and My Dictator (2014) before receiving wider recognition for the television series Reply 1988 (2015–2016), Law School (2021), and Law and the City (2025).

== Personal life ==
Ryu has an older sister, actress Ryu Abel (born Ryu Sun-young), who is three years older than her.

== Filmography ==
=== Film ===
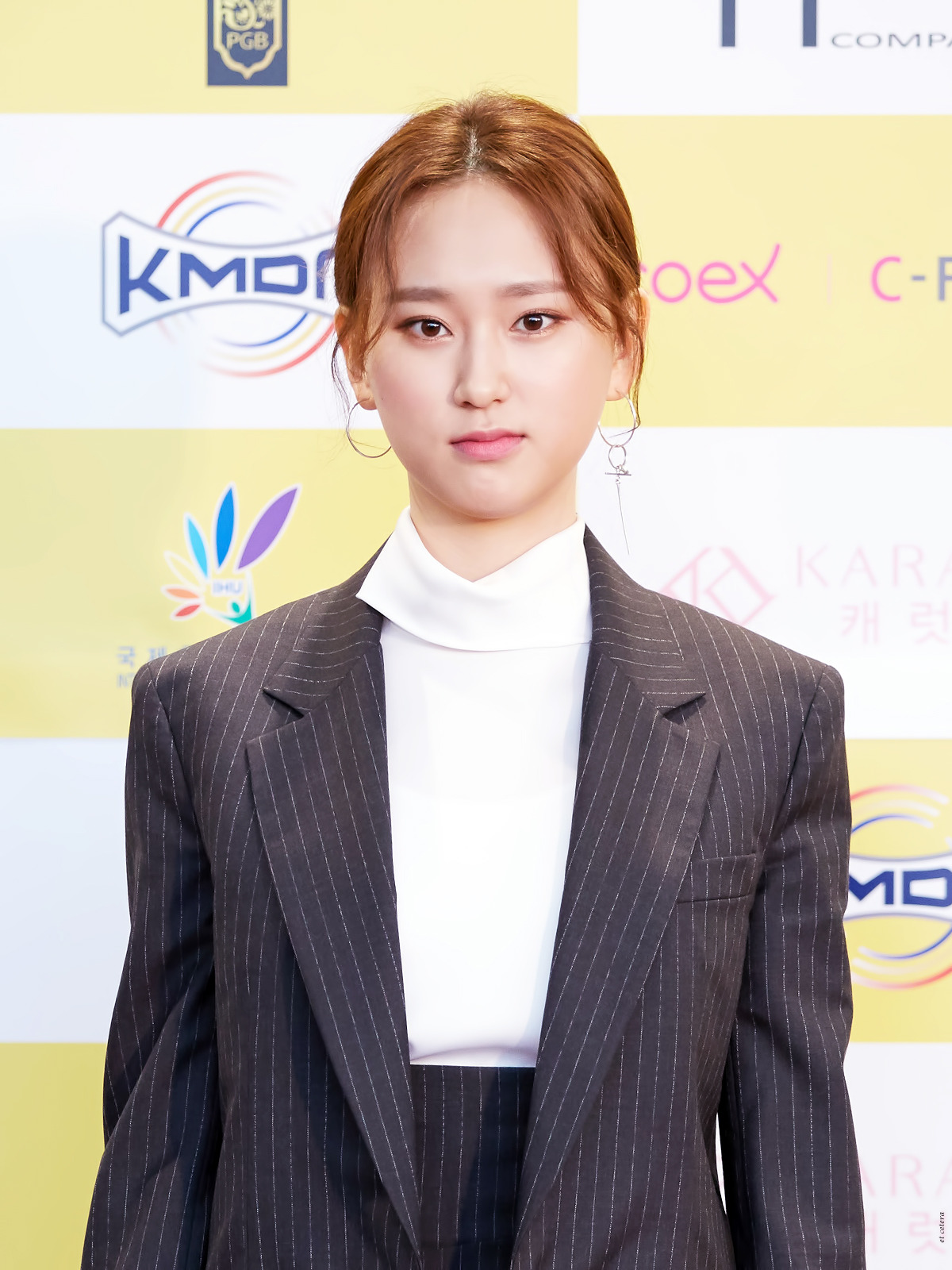
Ryu at the Chunsa Film Awards in 2016

| Year | Title | | Role | Notes | Ref. |
| Year | English | Korean | Role | Notes | Ref. |
|---|---|---|---|---|---|
| 2007 | High School Girls | 여고생이다 ('To Be a High School Girl') | Y | Short film | |
| 2009 | My Old Lady | 곰이 나에게 ('A Bear To Me') | Hye-young | Short film | |
| 2010 | LOVE, 100 °C | 사랑은 100 °C | High School Girl | Short film | |
| 2011 | A Time to Love | 애정만세 ('Full of Affection') | Min-jung | Segment: "Immature" | |
| 2011 | Hiding Behind A Tree | 나무뒤에 숨다 | Si-woo | Short film | |
| 2011 | Heart Vibrator | 하트바이브레이터 | Ji-hye | Short film | |
| 2011 | 1m, Between You and Me | 너와 나의 거리, 1미터 | Yu-na | Short film | |
| 2012 | Headphone | 헤드폰 | Yeon-jin | Short film | |
| 2012 | Forest | 숲 | Esther | Short film | |
| 2012 | Graduation Trip | 졸업여행 | Yu-na | Short film | |
| 2013 | Horror Stories 2 | 무서운 이야기 | Sa Tan-hee's Friend | Story: The Escape | |
| 2013 | Till the Break of Day | 마힘내 날리사엔다 | Hye-ju | Short film | |
| 2013 | The Fake | 사이비 | Young-sun's Friend 2, Karaoke Hostess 2 (voice) | Animated film | |
| 2013 | INGtoogi: The Battle of Internet Trolls | 잉투기 | Young-ja | | |
| 2013 | The Shadow Girl | 그림자 소녀 | Hye-jeong | Short film | |
| 2013 | Romance in Seoul | 서울연애 | Ji-hye | Episode 2: 'Seoul Life' | |
| 2013 | Understanding Movies | 시나리오 가이드 ('Scenario Guide') | | Short film | |
| 2014 | Manshin: Ten Thousand Spirits | 만신 | Mr. Park's sister in law | | |
| 2014 | Slow Video | 슬로우 비디오 | 이십초 "isipcho" | | |
| 2014 | My Dictator | 나의 독재자 | Yeo-jung | | |
| 2015 | Fatal Intuition | 그놈이다 ('It's Him') | Eun-ji | | |
| 2016 | Love, Lies | 해어화 ("Flowers that Understand Words") | Kim Ok-hyang | | |
| 2017 | The Mayor | 특별시민 | Im Min-seon | | |
| 2026 | The Intern | 인턴 | Choi Min-a | | |
| 2026 | The Assassin(s) | 암살자(들) | Seo Yoon-hee | | |
| TBA | Killing Time | 킬링타임 | Yeon-woo | | |

=== Television series ===
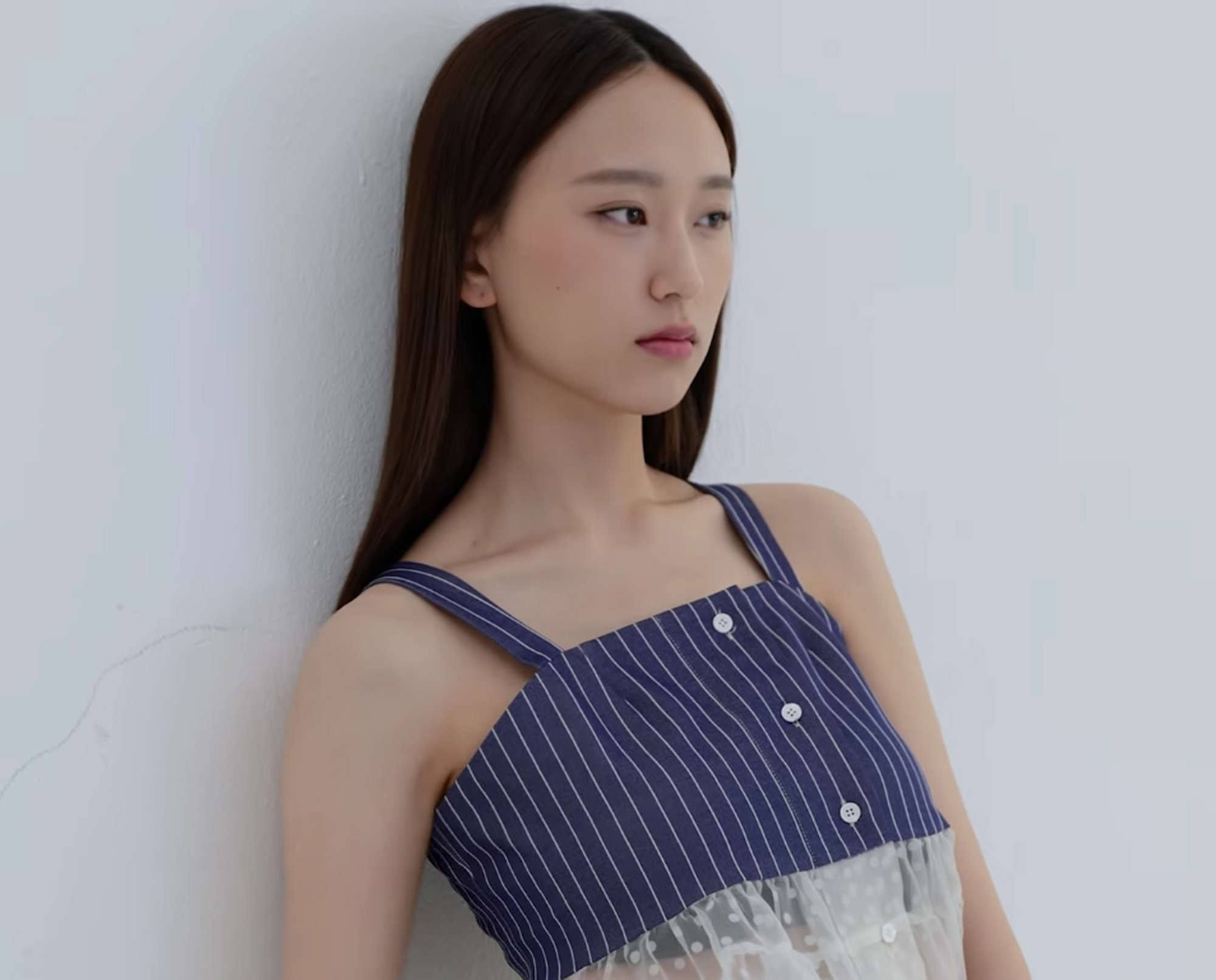
Ryu in 2021

| Year | Title | Role | Notes | Ref. |
|---|---|---|---|---|
| 2015 | Spy | Noh Eun-ah | | |
| 2015 | Heart To Heart | Lee Eun-ho / Lee Jin-ho | | |
| 2015 | Reply 1988 | Sung Bo-ra | | |
| 2018 | Dear My Room | Shim Eun-joo | | |
| 2021 | Law School | Kang Sol A / Kang Dan / Erica Shin | | |
| 2023 | Adult Kids | Baek Han-ah | | |
| 2024 | Gangnam B-Side | Seo Ji-su | | |
| 2025 | Law and the City | Bae Moon-jung | | |
| 2025 | The Nice Guy | Park Seok-hee | | |
| TBA | Speaking Death | Cho Min-ji | | |
| TBA | Moving | | Season 2 | |

=== Television shows ===
| Year | Title | Role | Notes | Ref. |
|---|---|---|---|---|
| 2024 | Europe Outside the Tent | Cast member | Season 4 | |
| 2025–2026 | Reply 1988 10th Anniversary | Cast member | | |

=== Music video appearances ===
| Year | Title | Ref. |
|---|---|---|
| 2025 | "Hyehwa-dong (or Ssangmun-dong)" | |

== Discography ==
=== Soundtrack appearances ===
List of soundtrack appearances, showing year released, and name of the album
| Title | Year | Album |
|---|---|---|
| "Hyehwa-dong (or Ssangmun-dong) (혜화동 (혹은 쌍문동))" (Ssangmun-dong Kids featuring Ryu Hye-young) | 2025 | Reply 1988 10th Anniversary OST |

== Accolades ==
=== Awards and nominations ===
| Award | Year | Category | Nominated work | Result | Ref. |
|---|---|---|---|---|---|
| 6th Evergreen Multicultural International Short Film Festival | 2012 | Best Actress | Graduation Trip | Won | |
| 11th Mise-en-scène Short Film Festival | 2012 | Film Grand Prize | Forest | Won | |
| 9th Max Movie Awards | 2014 | Best New Actress | INGtoogi: The Battle of Internet Trolls | Nominated | |
| 15th Busan Film Critics Awards | 2014 | Best New Actress | INGtoogi: The Battle of Internet Trolls | Won | |
| 23rd Buil Film Awards | 2014 | Best New Actress | INGtoogi: The Battle of Internet Trolls | Nominated | |
| 35th Blue Dragon Film Awards | 2014 | Best New Actress | My Dictator | Nominated | |
| 10th Max Movie Awards | 2015 | Best New Actress | My Dictator | Nominated | |
| InStyle Star Icon | 2016 | Next Generation Female Actress | Fatal Intuition, Love, Lies | Won | |
| 10th Korean Cable TV Awards | 2016 | Rising Star Award | Reply 1988 | Won | |
| 21st Chunsa Film Art Awards | 2016 | Special Popularity Award | —N/a | Won | |
| 52nd Baeksang Arts Awards | 2016 | Best Actress – Television | Reply 1988 | Nominated | |
| 1st tvN10 Awards | 2016 | Scene-Stealer Award, Actress | Reply 1988 | Nominated | |

=== Listicles ===
Name of publisher, year listed, name of listicle, and placement
| Publisher | Year | Listicle | Placement | Ref. |
|---|---|---|---|---|
| Korean Film Council | 2021 | Korean Actors 200 (Note: Introduces 200 actors that best represent the present and future of Korean cinema to the people in the film industry all over the world.) | Included | |
