= Lee Chae-eun =

South Korean actress (born 2004)

- Born: 13 August 2004 (age 22); South Korea
- Other name: Yi Chae-eun
- Occupation: Actress
- Years active: 2008–present
- Agent: Youborn Company
- Known for: The Mimic; All of Us Are Dead; Detective K: Secret of the Lost Island

Lee Chae-eun is a South Korean actress. She is known for her roles in dramas such as One Mom and Three Dads, 100% Era, Grand Prince and All of Us Are Dead. She also appeared in movies Detective K: Secret of the Lost Island, The Mimic, The Last Princess and Steel Rain.

== Early life ==
She was born on August 13, 2004, in South Korea. Lee Chae-eun made her debut as a child actress in 2008 and joined Youborn Company.

== Career ==
She appeared in several dramas One Mom and Three Dads, 100% Era, Grand Prince and All of Us Are Dead. She completed her studies from Shinseo High School. She also appeared in a number of films Detective K: Secret of the Virtuous Widow, Detective K: Secret of the Virtuous Widow, Hot Young Bloods, Detective K: Secret of the Lost Island, The Mimic and Steel Rain.

== Filmography ==
=== Television series ===
Year	Title	Role	Ref.
2008	One Mom and Three Dads	Na-yeong's friend	
2018	Grand Prince	Poem	
2021	100% Era	Lim Yu-ri	
2022	All of Us Are Dead	Park Hee-su	
2025	First Love	Kim I-na	

=== Film ===
Year	Title		Role	Ref.
Year	English	Korean	Role	Ref.
2011	Detective K: Secret of the Virtuous Widow	조선명탐정: 각시투구꽃의 비밀	Young slave	
2013	Save it!	구하라!	Chae-eun	
2014	Hot Young Bloods	피끓는 청춘	Young-sook	
2015	Detective K: Secret of the Lost Island	조선명탐정: 사라진 놉의 딸	Da-hae	
2016	The Last Princess	덕혜옹주	Jung-hye	
2017	The Mimic	장산범	Hyo-jung	
2017	Steel Rain	강철비	Kwak Se-rim	
2017	Soon-Yi	순이	Soon-yi	
2019	Cane Girl	지팡이소녀	Min-seo	
2022	Hunt	헌트	Yang Bo-sung's daughter	
2025	Executioner's Daughter	순이	Soo-ni	
