= The Client (2011 film) =

- Theatrical release poster
- Hangul: 의뢰인
- Hanja: 依賴人
- RR: Uiroein
- MR: Ŭiroein
- Directed by: Sohn Young-sung
- Written by: Sohn Young-sung; Lee Chun-hyeong
- Produced by: Yu Jeong-hun; Kim Jho Kwang-soo; Shin Chang-gil
- Starring: Ha Jung-woo; Park Hee-soon; Jang Hyuk
- Cinematography: Choi Sang-ho
- Edited by: Kim Sun-min
- Music by: Jo Yeong-wook
- Production company: Generation Blue Films
- Distributed by: Showbox/Mediaplex
- Release date: September 29, 2011
- Running time: 123 minutes
- Country: South Korea
- Language: Korean
- Box office: US$15.8 million

The Client (Korean: 의뢰인; RR: Uiroein) is a 2011 South Korean crime thriller film directed by Sohn Young-sung, starring Ha Jung-woo, Park Hee-soon, and Jang Hyuk. The film was released on September 29, 2011.

== Plot ==
On his wedding anniversary, Han Chul-min (Jang Hyuk) drives into his apartment complex parking lot and sees a large crowd gathered by the entryway into his apartment. He enters holding a bouquet of flowers for his wife, instead he finds police officers scattered about collecting evidence. In his bedroom there is a large pool of blood dripping onto the floor from the bed, and his wife is nowhere to be seen. Han is then handcuffed, arrested and taken into police custody for her murder.

Prosecutor Ahn Min-ho (Park Hee-soon) takes charge of prosecuting the Han murder case. He has little doubt in the guilt of Chul-min. Confirming his suspicions that Han was arrested as the prime suspect in a serial murder case, but later released on insufficient evidence.

Jang Ho-won (Sung Dong-il), an investigator, brings the case of Han to defense lawyer Kang Sung-hee (Ha Jung-woo). He informs Kang that the alleged murder victim's body was never discovered, the police have yet to find any direct evidence connecting Han to the murder of his wife and his arrest is based on circumstantial evidence. Han, who works at a film laboratory, has no fingerprints as they are erased from the strong chemicals he handles every day. Convinced that Han is not guilty, Kang takes the case and applies in court for a jury trial and goes through a series of legal clashes against rival prosecutor Ahn. The case gets even more complex as details about the mysterious life of Han's wife are unveiled.

== Cast ==
- Ha Jung-woo as Kang Sung-hee, lawyer
- Park Hee-soon as Ahn Min-ho, rival prosecutor
- Jang Hyuk as Han Cheol-min, the client
- Sung Dong-il as Jang Ho-won, Kang's investigator
- Kim Sung-ryung as Kang's paralegal
- Jung Won-joong as Chief public prosecutor
- Yoo Da-in as Seo Jung-ah, murder victim and Cheol-min's wife
- Park Hyuk-kwon as Police inspector Seo
- Joo Jin-mo as Judge
- Ye Soo-jung as Jung-ah's mother
- Hwang Byeong-guk as detective in charge
- Min Bok-gi as Professor Choi
- Yoo Soon-woong as elderly man at the store
- Bae Sung-woo as Prosecutor Park
- Bae Yun-beom as Prosecutor Bae
- Park Seong-geun as Ranger
- Park Sung-yeon as Jung-ah's co-worker
- Yu Ha-jun as Forensic team member
- Choi Hee-jin as Blood researcher
- Lee Chang-hoon

== Reception ==
The film attracted 826,287 admissions in its first week of release and till the end of 18 October achieved a total of 2.1 million It ranked #2 and grossed ₩541 million in its first week of release but by the end of the second week rose to #2 with a gross of ₩5 billion and grossed a total of ₩17 billion after seven weeks of screening.
