= Miracle on Jongno Street =

2010 South Korean documentary film

- Hangul: 종로의 기적
- RR: Jongnoui gijeok
- MR: Chongnoŭi kijŏk
- Directed by: Lee Hyuk-sang
- Produced by: Kim Il-ran
- Starring: So Jun-moon; Jang Byeong-gwon; Choi Young-soo; Jeong Yol
- Cinematography: Lee Hyuk-sang; Kim Il-ran; Kim Seong-hui; Hong Ji-yu
- Edited by: Lee Hyuk-sang; Kim Il-ran
- Music by: Jeong Ji-yun
- Production companies: PINKS; Chingusai
- Distributed by: Cinema Dal
- Release dates: October 7, 2010 (15th Busan International Film Festival); June 2, 2011 (South Korea)
- Running time: 109 minutes
- Country: South Korea
- Language: Korean

Miracle on Jongno Street (Korean: 종로의 기적) is a 2010 South Korean documentary film directed by Lee Hyuk-sang. The film follows four gay men connected to Jongno, Seoul, and depicts their everyday lives, relationships, activism, and experiences of coming out. It premiered at the 15th Busan International Film Festival in October 2010, where it received the BIFF Mecenat Award, and was released theatrically in South Korea on June 2, 2011.

The film is set around Nagwon-dong in Jongno, an area described by film sources as a gathering place for gay men in Seoul. It was also selected as Best Independent Film of the Year by the Korean Independent Film Association.

== Synopsis ==
Miracle on Jongno Street documents the lives of four gay men in Seoul. So Jun-moon is a film director working through the personal and professional difficulties of coming out. Jang Byeong-gwon is a human rights activist involved in LGBT advocacy. Choi Young-soo, a cook from outside Seoul, finds community through G-Voice, a gay men's choir. Jeong Yol is an office worker who reflects on the legal and social limitations placed on same-sex relationships in South Korea.

The documentary presents Jongno and Nakwon-dong as social spaces where gay men gather, form friendships, and build community. The director also appears in the film, connecting the four subjects' stories with his own reflections on coming out and gay identity.

== Production ==
The film was directed by Lee Hyuk-sang and produced by Kim Il-ran. It was produced by PINKS, a queer feminist media collective, in collaboration with Chingusai, a Korean gay men's human rights organization. According to an interview in Cine21, the film developed from a coming-out project begun by Chingusai in 2003, and Lee became involved while working with PINKS on films related to sexual minority communities.

In a director's note published by PINKS, Lee described the documentary as a record of four gay men living openly amid discrimination against sexual minorities in South Korea. The film was shot in color on HDV. Cinematography was credited to Lee Hyuk-sang, Kim Il-ran, Kim Seong-hui, and Hong Ji-yu; editing was credited to Lee Hyuk-sang and Kim Il-ran; and music was composed by Jeong Ji-yun.

== Release ==
Miracle on Jongno Street had its world premiere at the 15th Busan International Film Festival in October 2010, where it received the BIFF Mecenat Award. It was released theatrically in South Korea on June 2, 2011, with distribution by Cinema Dal.

The film also screened at the Seoul Independent Film Festival. PINKS lists additional screenings at the Incheon Human Rights Film Festival, the Seoul Human Rights Film Festival, the Asia Queer Film & Video Festival in Japan, and the Festival Franco-Coréen du Film in France.

== Reception ==
The Korean Film Council describes Miracle on Jongno Street as the first feature-length gay documentary film in Korea. Haus der Kulturen der Welt similarly describes it as the first Korean documentary on its subject and notes that the film marked Lee Hyuk-sang's public coming out as a director.

In 2010, the Korean Independent Film Association selected the film as Best Independent Film of the Year. According to Kyunghyang Shinmun, the association stated that the film encouraged heterosexual viewers to understand and respect lives different from their own and gave sexual minorities courage for self-affirmation.

== Accolades ==
Year	Festival / organization	Award	Result
2010	Busan International Film Festival	BIFF Mecenat Award	Won
2010	Korean Independent Film Association	Best Independent Film of the Year	Won

== See also ==
- LGBT rights in South Korea
- LGBT culture in South Korea
- Busan International Film Festival
- Korean independent film
- Documentary film
