= Oh Dal-su =

South Korean actor (born 1968)

- 오달수
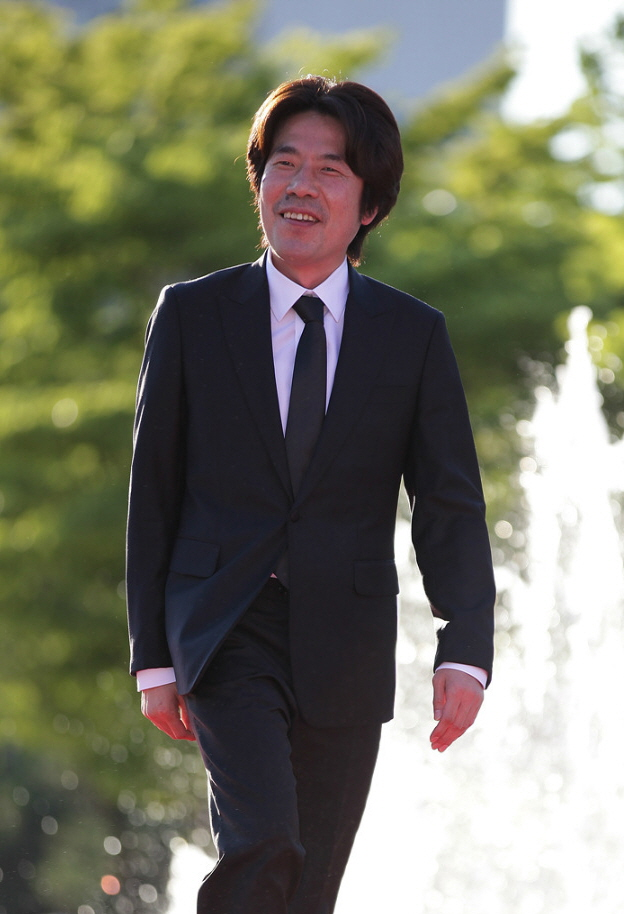
- Oh in 2015
- Born: 15 June 1968 (age 58); Seongdang-dong, Dalseo-gu, Daegu, South Korea
- Other name: Oh Dal-soo
- Education: Dong-eui University (BA)
- Occupation: Actor
- Years active: 1990–present

Korean name
- Hangul: 오달수
- RR: O Dalsu
- MR: O Talsu

Oh Dal-su (Korean: 오달수; born 15 June 1968) is a South Korean character actor who has appeared on television, film, and stage. His acting career spans over 35 years. Oh is best known for his supporting roles in director Park Chan-wook's films, having appeared in six of Park's films: Oldboy (2003), If You Were Me (2003), Lady Vengeance (2005), I'm a Cyborg, But That's OK (2006), Thirst (2009) and No Other Choice (2025).

In 2015, Oh received praise for his role in Ode to My Father (2014), for which he won a Grand Bell Award and a Blue Dragon Film Award.

== Career ==
Oh began his acting career in theater in Busan, and since 2001, he has been the head of theater company Singiru Manhwagyeong ("Mirage and Kaleidoscope"). His rich experience on the stage, in local productions such as Ogu, later made Oh an in-demand character actor on the big screen.

Oh has starred in numerous successful films, in roles such as the owner of the organized crime-funded private jail in Oldboy (2003), a former gang boss in Mapado (2005), a weapons smuggler in A Bittersweet Life (2005), a transvestite in Foxy Festival (2010), a Chinese-Korean conman in The Thieves (2012), and a sympathetic inmate in Miracle in Cell No. 7. He also dubbed the voice of the monster in The Host (2006).

In March 2018, Oh was dropped from Along with the Gods: The Two Worlds due to sexual harassment allegations. In 2018, he withdrew from the cast of My Mister (2018) and took a two-year hiatus from acting.

In 2024, Oh played boat captain Park Yeong Gil in the second and third season of Squid Game (2021).

== Legal issues ==
In 1987, Oh was arrested and detained for three days for protesting at the June Democratic Struggle.

On 22 February 2018, Oh was accused of sexual harassment. He initially denied the accusation. On 26 February, further accusations against Oh were broadcast on JTBC Newsroom, during an interview with a woman who accused Oh of sexual harassment and sexual assault. The following day, actress Uhm Ji-young came forward in JTBC's Newsroom, saying that she was also sexually harassed by Oh in 2003. On 28 February, he apologized to the victims. In August 2019, Oh was cleared of sexual assault charges.

== Selected filmography ==
=== Film ===
Year	Title	Role	Notes/Ref.
2002	Bet on My Disco	뻘줌남	
2003	Adolescence		Short film
2003	If You Were Me	Police officer	Segment: "Never Ending Peace and Love"
2003	Oldboy	Park Cheol-woong	
2004	The Secret of Eel-fishing	Choi Dal-bong	Short film
2004	The Last Wolf	Gold Tooth	
2004	The President's Barber	Mr. Ahn	
2004	Woman is the Future of Man	Rice cake man	
2005	How Does the Blind Dream?		Short film
2005	Mapado	Boss	
2005	Crying Fist	Yong-dae	
2005	A Bittersweet Life	Myung-gu	
2005	Sympathy for Lady Vengeance	Mr. Chang	
2006	Forbidden Quest	Hwang-ga (copier)	
2006	A Bloody Aria	Oh-geun	
2006	The Host	Monster (voice)	
2006	Between Love and Hate	Hak-yi	
2006	Three Fellas	Na Sang-choon	
2006	Once in a Summer	Nam Gyun-soo	
2006	I'm a Cyborg, But That's OK	Shin Duk-cheon	
2007	Project Makeover	Jung-ju's father	
2007	The Show Must Go On	Hyun-soo	
2007	Driving with My Wife's Lover	Taxi driver	
2008	Baby and I		
2008	A Tale of Legendary Libido	Kang-mok	
2008	The Good, the Bad, the Weird	Butler Park	
2009	Private Eye	Oh Young-dal	
2009	Thirst	Young-du	
2009	Dream	Lee Young-chul	TV series (SBS)
2009	Short! Short! Short! 2009: Show Me the Money	Factory owner	Segment: "Hundred Nails and a Deer Antler"
2009	Girlfriends	Voice doctor	
2010	Nice Shorts	Father (voice)	Segment: "Don't Step Out of the House"
2010	The Servant	Old man Ma	
2010	Troubleshooter	Choi Sang-chul	
2010	Foxy Festival	Kim Gwang-rok	
2010	Late Blossom	Dal-su	
2011	Detective K: Secret of the Virtuous Widow	Seo-pil	
2011	Head	Kim Sang-chul/Oh Byeong-seok	
2011	Hindsight	Teacher Yook	
2011	About Alcohol	Narrator	Documentary
2012	Salamander Guru and The Shadows	Seon-dal	TV sitcom (SBS)
2012	The Thieves	Andrew	
2012	R2B: Return to Base	Min Dong-pil	
2012	The Traffickers	Kyung-jae	
2012	The Ugly Duckling	Nak-man's father	
2012	Code Name: Jackal	Chief detective Ma	
2012	Mr. Vertigo	Master	Short film
2013	Miracle in Cell No. 7	So Yang-ho	
2013	My Paparotti	Principal Deok-saeng	
2013	Mai Ratima	Man with stolen goods	
2013	The Attorney	Park Dong-ho	
2014	The Pirates	Han Sang-jil	
2014	Slow Video	Byeong-soo	
2014	Ode to My Father	Dal-gu	
2015	Detective K: Secret of the Lost Island	Seo-pil	
2015	Assassination	Old Man	
2015	Veteran	Team leader Oh	
2015	You Call It Passion	General manager Go	Cameo
2016	The Great Actor	Jang Sung-Pil	
2016	Run Off	Kang Dae-Woong	
2016	Old Days	Himself	Documentary
2016	Tunnel	Kim Dae-kyung	
2016	Master	Hwang Myeong-joon	
2017	Memoir of a Murderer	Byeong-man	
2017	Along With the Gods: The Two Worlds	Judge	
2017	1987: When the Day Comes	Yi Doo-seok	
2018	Detective K: Secret of the Living Dead	Seo-pil	
2020	Best Friend	Lee Ui-sik	
2021	Yoshichal	god	Independent film
2022	I Want to Know Your Parents	Do Ji-yeol	
2023	Ungnami	Na Bok-cheon	Documentary film
2023	4:00 PM	Jung-in	
2024	I, the Executioner	Team leader Oh	
2025	No Other Choice	Detective #1	
2025	Boss	In-sul	
TBA	Control		

=== Television series ===
Year	Title	Role	Notes	Ref.
2024-2025	Squid Game	Sea Captain Park	Season 2-3	

=== Theater ===
Year	Title	Role
2005	Art	Kyu-tae
	해일	
	Men's Impulse	
2006	The Tenant	
2008	The Goat, or Who Is Sylvia?	Martin Gray
2008	Marijuana	Yong-bo
2009	Mondays 5 p.m.	
2010	Ogu	
2011	Holding the Sun and the Moon	Elder Hwang
2012	Kisaragi Miki-chan	Kimura Takuya
2012	House of Dead / Nobel Prize for Literature Award Speech	Writer
2013	Kisaragi Miki-chan	Kimura Takuya

== Accolades ==
=== Awards and nominations ===
Year	Award	Category	Nominated work	Result
2005	6th Busan Film Critics Awards	Best Supporting Actor	Mapado	Won
2006	27th Blue Dragon Film Awards	Best Supporting Actor	Forbidden Quest	Nominated
2007	15th Chunsa Film Art Awards	Best Supporting Actor	Once in a Summer	Won
2009	SBS Drama Awards	Best Supporting Actor in a Drama Special	Dream	Nominated
2010	47th Grand Bell Awards	Best Supporting Actor	The Servant	Nominated
2010	31st Blue Dragon Film Awards	Best Supporting Actor	The Servant	Nominated
2013	49th Baeksang Arts Awards	Best Supporting Actor (Film)	Miracle in Cell No. 7	Nominated
2013	50th Grand Bell Awards	Best Supporting Actor	Miracle in Cell No. 7	Nominated
2013	21st Korean Culture and Entertainment Awards	Top Excellence Award, Actor in Film	Miracle in Cell No. 7	Won
2014	34th Golden Cinema Festival	Best Supporting Actor	Miracle in Cell No. 7	Won
2015	10th Max Movie Awards	Best Supporting Actor	Ode to My Father	Nominated
2015	20th Chunsa Film Art Awards	Best Actor	Detective K: Secret of the Lost Island	Nominated
2015	19th Bucheon International Fantastic Film Festival	It Star Award	Ode to My Father	Won
2015	24th Buil Film Awards	Best Supporting Actor	Ode to My Father	Nominated
2015	52nd Grand Bell Awards	Best Supporting Actor	Ode to My Father	Won
2015	52nd Grand Bell Awards	Best Supporting Actor	Assassination	Nominated
2015	36th Blue Dragon Film Awards	Best Supporting Actor	Ode to My Father	Won
2015	2nd Korean Film Producers Association Awards	Best Supporting Actor	Ode to My Father	Won
2015	6th Korean Popular Culture & Arts Awards	Prime Minister's Award	—N/a	Won
2016	7th Korean Film Reporters Association Awards (KOFRA)	Best Supporting Actor	Assassination	Won
2016	11th Max Movie Awards	Best Supporting Actor	Veteran	Won
2016	21st Chunsa Film Art Awards	Best Supporting Actor	Veteran	Nominated
2016	52nd Baeksang Arts Awards	Best Supporting Actor (Film)	Veteran	Nominated
2016	37th Blue Dragon Film Awards	Best Supporting Actor	The Tunnel	Nominated
2016	53rd Grand Bell Awards	Best Supporting Actor	The Tunnel	Nominated

=== Listicles ===
Name of publisher, year listed, name of listicle, and placement
Publisher	Year	Listicle	Placement	Ref.
Forbes	2016	Korea Power Celebrity 40	38th	
Forbes	2017	Korea Power Celebrity 40	34th	
