= Kim Takhwan =

South Korean writer (born 1968)

- 김탁환
- Born: 1968 (age 57–58)
- Writing career
- Language: Korean

Korean name
- Hangul: 김탁환
- Hanja: 金琸桓
- RR: Gim Takhwan
- MR: Kim T'akhwan

Kim Takhwan (born October 27, 1968) is a South Korean novelist and literary critic. He left the security of a tenured professorship to focus on his writing career.

== Work ==
Almost all of Kim's novels take place in the mid to late Joseon dynasty (1392–1910), a period when the feudal dynasty still remained unchallenged though the demand to respond to the advent of modern era was beginning to be heard. Kim is not content with mere replication of historical characters and events, but always desires that his readers discover a sense of continuum and ongoing communication between the past and the present through his works.

Indestructible, a four-volume novel about Yi Sun-sin, the famed naval general who led victorious maritime battles against Japanese invaders from 1592 to 1598, focuses on the humanistic depiction of the hero and his internal struggles. Kim expanded this novel into eight volumes and publishing it under the new title The Immortal Yi Sun-sin. Another historical novel, The Last Nineteen Days of Heo Gyun details the life of Heo Gyun, a mid-Joseon dynasty writer, revolutionary and the author of the classic novel Tale of Hong Gildong, and at the same time conveys the sense of despair as well as fervor experienced by the intellectuals of the 1980s. In the similar manner, the sentiments expressed in Apnok River, a seven-volume novel about the life of the legendary general Im Gyeong-eop, parallels the sense of chaos that plagued the intellectuals in the 1990s as a result of the fall of the eastern block. I, Hwang Jini dramatizes the life of Hwang Jini, the famed gisaeng from the Joseon dynasty who was also a gifted writer and an intellectual. This novel was also published in a critical edition that contains abundant annotations and supplemental texts.

== Adaptations ==
Several of Kim's novels have adapted for the screen, including the historical television series Roll of Thunder, Immortal Admiral Yi Sun-sin, and Hwang Jini, followed by the films Detective K: Secret of the Virtuous Widow and Gabi. The film rights for his novels A Court Lady from Joseon in Paris, The Banggakbon Murder Case, and The Arrest of the Ghost by a Buyeo County Official have already been sold.

== Novels (in Korean) ==
- The Immortal Yi Sun-sin
- The Last Nineteen Days of Heo Gyun
- Apnok River
- I, Hwang Jini
- The Secret of the Virtuous Widow
- Russian Coffee
- Sad, To Be Forgotten
- A Court Lady from Joseon in Paris
- The Banggakbon Murder Case
- The Arrest of the Ghost by a Buyeo County Official

== Screen adaptations ==
Year	Adaptation	Notes	From novel
2000–2001	Roll of Thunder (천둥소리)	Television series (KBS2)	Heo Gyun, the Last 19 Days (허균, 최후의 19일)
2004–2005	Immortal Admiral Yi Sun-sin (불멸의 이순신)	Television series (KBS1)	The Immortal Yi Sun-sin (불멸의 이순신)
2005	Sad, To Be Forgotten (서러워라, 잊혀진다는 것은)	TV Novel episode (KBS1)	Sad, To Be Forgotten (서러워라, 잊혀진다는 것은)
2006	Hwang Jini (황진이)	Television series (KBS2)	I, Hwang Jini (나, 황진이)
2011	Detective K: Secret of the Virtuous Widow (조선명탐정: 각시투구꽃의 비밀)	Film	The Secret of the Virtuous Widow (열녀문의 비밀)
2012	Gabi (가비)	Film	Russian Coffee (노서아 가비)
2018	Detective K: Secret of the Living Dead (조선명탐정: 흡혈괴마의 비밀)	Film	The Banggakbon Murder Case
