= Detective K =

South Korean film series

Detective K is a South Korean comedic mystery film series based on the novels by Kim Tak-hwan. Kim Myung-min stars as the title character along with Oh Dal-su as Han Seo-pil, an important supporting character. It consists of three films.
