= Woo Hyun =

South Korean actor (born 1964)

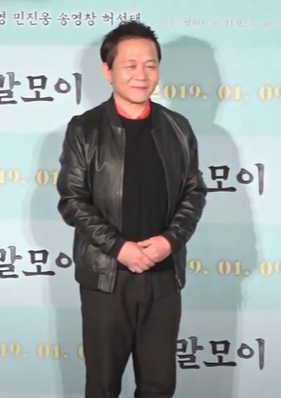
- Woo in 2018
- Born: 1964 (age 61–62); Gwangju, South Jeolla Province, South Korea (present Gwangju, South Korea)
- Education: Bachelor of Theology – Yonsei University
- Occupation: Actor
- Years active: 1990–present
- Agent: Mars Entertainment

Korean name
- Hangul: 우현
- Hanja: 禹賢
- RR: U Hyeon
- MR: U Hyŏn

Woo Hyun (born 1964) is a South Korean actor and former democracy activist.

== Filmography ==
=== Film ===
| Year | Title | Role |
|---|---|---|
| 2017 | Fabricated City | Old Prisoner |
| 2017 | 1987: When the Day Comes | Kang Min-chang |
| 2018 | Detective K: Secret of the Living Dead | Mr. Bang |
| 2019 | Mal-Mo-E: The Secret Mission | Im Dong-ik |
| 2019 | Tazza: One Eyed Jack | Mool |
| 2020 | Beyond That Mountain | Pottery shop owner |
| 2024 | Handsome Guys | Father Kim |
| 2024 | Land of Happiness | Lee Man-sik |

=== Television series ===
| Year | Title | Role |
|---|---|---|
| 2011–2012 | Living Among the Rich | Kim Woo-hyun |
| 2014 | Pinocchio | Dal-po's homeroom teacher |
| 2014 | Healer | Chul-Min |
| 2015 | The Time We Were Not in Love | Byun Woo-sik |
| 2015 | Reply 1988 | Adult Sung No-eul |
| 2016 | Beautiful Gong Shim | Gong Hyuk |
| 2016 | Another Miss Oh | Cameo appearances (episodes 15–18) |
| 2016 | Bring It On, Ghost | Ghost (episode 1) |
| 2016 | Listen to Love | Hanganggabshida (user name) |
| 2017 | Innocent Defendant | Han Sang-wook |
| 2017 | Introverted Boss | —N/a |
| 2017 | Romance Full of Life | In-sung's father |
| 2017 | Saimdang, Memoir of Colors | —N/a |
| 2017 | Tunnel | Go Man-seok |
| 2017 | Manhole | Suk-tae's father |
| 2017 | Judge vs. Judge | Choi Go-soo |
| 2017 | Black | Wang Yong-chun |
| 2018 | Cross | Noh Jong-il |
| 2018 | The Rich Son | Choi Hyo-dong |
| 2018 | Exit | Do Jung-man |
| 2018 | Heart Surgeons | Sang-ok |
| 2018 | Gangnam Beauty | Kang Tae-sik |
| 2018 | Clean with Passion for Now | |
| 2019 | The Light in Your Eyes | Woo Hyun |
| 2019 | Save Me 2 | Boongeo |
| 2019 | Flower Crew: Joseon Marriage Agency | doctor (cameo, episode 1) |
| 2020 | Good Casting | Myung Gye-chul |
| 2020 | Backstreet Rookie | Kwon Eui-choo |
| 2020 | Mystic Pop-up Bar | Kim Du-young (cameo) |
| 2020 | Tale of the Nine Tailed | drunk man at the bus stop (cameo) |
| 2020 | Awaken | Jang Seung-goo |
| 2020 | Sweet Home | Kim Suk-hyun |
| 2021 | True Beauty | the camping site manager (Ep. 8) |
| 2021 | Drama Stage: "Deokgu Is Back" | Cheon Bo-knam |
| 2021 | Law School | Sung Dong-il |
| 2021 | Racket Boys | Hong Yi-jang |
| 2021 | Crime Puzzle | Jo Seong-su |
| 2022 | Tracer | Yang Young-soon (Cameo, episode 1) |
| 2022 | It's Beautiful Now | Judiciary (Cameo, episode 1) |
| 2022 | Jinxed at First | President Park |
| 2022–2023 | Alchemy of Souls | Monk Ho-yeon (Season 1–2) |
| 2023 | Brain Works | Kim Gil-joong |
| 2023 | Kokdu: Season of Deity | Choi Dal-seung |
| 2023–2024 | Like Flowers in Sand | Park Pil-doo |
| 2024 | Love Song for Illusion | Eunuch Neung |
| 2025 | Buried Hearts | Cha Gang-cheon |
| 2025 | Heo's Diner | No-ong |

=== Variety shows ===
| Year | Title | Role |
|---|---|---|
| 2018 | Creaking Heroes | Cast Member |
| 2022 | Hot Singers | Cast Member |
