= Meet the In-Laws (2011 film) =

- Theatrical poster
- Hangul: 위험한 상견례
- RR: Wiheomhan sanggyeonnye
- MR: Wihŏmhan sanggyŏnnye
- Directed by: Kim Jin-young
- Written by: Ha Myeong-mi
- Produced by: Lee Seo-yeol
- Starring: Song Sae-byeok; Lee Si-young
- Cinematography: Jeong Jin-ho
- Edited by: Moon In-dae
- Music by: Oh Jun-seong
- Production company: The Pictures With a View
- Distributed by: Lotte Entertainment
- Release date: March 31, 2011
- Running time: 118 minutes
- Country: South Korea
- Language: Korean
- Box office: US$17.6 million

Meet the In-Laws (Korean: 위험한 상견례) is a 2011 South Korean romantic comedy film directed by Kim Jin-young, starring Song Sae-byeok and Lee Si-young.

The Korean title literally translates to "Dangerous Formal Greeting Between Families of the Bride and Bridegroom," hence the alternate English titles Clash of the Families and Dangerous Meeting.

A comedic take on star-crossed lovers set after the 1988 Seoul Olympics, the film explores the deep-rooted regionalism that has dogged various aspects of Korean society, particularly the antagonism between people from southeastern Gyeongsang and people from Jeolla.

== Plot ==
Naive, pure-hearted Hyun-joon writes romance comics under the pseudonym "Hyun-ji." He becomes pen pals with Da-hong, and the two fall in love and begin dating. When Da-hong reveals that her father is forcing her to go on matchmaking dates with other men, Hyun-joon impulsively decides to propose to her. But Hyun-joon hails from humble roots in South Jeolla Province, and the couple knows that Da-hong's wealthy Gyeongsang family will instantly disapprove of him because of this. Unbeknownst to them, their respective fathers were also bitter rivals in high school baseball. So when Hyun-joon goes to Busan to ask for Da-hong's hand in marriage, he hides his accent and pretends to be from Apgujeong, the ritziest area in Seoul. As her relatives scrutinize, intimidate and spy on him, Hyun-joon is determined to overcome all their obstacles and marry Da-hong.

== Cast ==
- Song Sae-byeok as Hyun-joon
- Lee Si-young as Da-hong
- Baek Yoon-sik as Young-kwang
- Kim Soo-mi as Choon-ja
- Kim Eung-soo as Se-dong
- Park Chul-min as Dae-sik
- Kim Jung-nan as Young-ja
- Jung Sung-hwa as Woon-bong
- Park Hyo-joo as Jin-kyung
- Kim Do-yeon as Yoon-sook
- Jung Woong-in as man on blind date (cameo)
- Lee Young-beom as Park Nam-jung's manager (cameo)
- Gil Hae-yeon as Housekeeper (cameo)
- Kim Yang-woo as Gay boyfriend (cameo)
- Choi Jae-hwan as Jeolla old-timer (cameo)
- Lee Han-wi as Coffee shop DJ (cameo)
- Park Nam-jung as himself (cameo)
- Ha Il-seong as narrator

== Box office ==
Meet the In-Laws was the ninth best-selling Korean film of 2011, grossing US$17,646,715 (or ₩19.7 billion) with 2,595,625 tickets sold.

== Spin-off ==
Kim Jin-young directed a spin-off in 2015, Enemies In-Law. Though not technically a sequel given its different characters, the film's plot is also about an engaged couple facing familial disapproval, this time because the woman is from a family of police officers and the man's parents are criminals.
