= Showbox =

South Korean film company

Showbox Corporation
- Showbox logo
- Native name: 쇼박스
- Formerly: Showbox Mediaplex Co., Inc. (쇼박스㈜미디어플렉스)
- Type: Joint-stock
- Traded as: KRX: 086980 (July 7, 2006)
- Industry: Entertainment, media
- Predecessor: Mediaplex Co., Ltd.
- Founded: June 10, 1999; 27 years ago in Seoul, South Korea
- Founder: Yoo Jung-hoon
- Successor: Showbox Corporation
- Headquarters: Nambusunhwan, Gangnam, Seoul, South Korea
- Area served: Worldwide
- Key people: Yoo Jung-hoon (ex-CEO & founder); Shin Ho-jung (CEO)
- Services: Film distribution
- Revenue: 12,327,000,000 won (2014)
- Operating income: 2,086,000,000 won
- Net income: 20000,000 won
- Total equity: 105,272,000,000 won (2014)
- Owner: Orion Holdings: 57.50%; Lee Hwa-kyung: 0.3%
- Parent: Orion Holdings
- Website: www.showbox.co.kr

Showbox Corporation (Korean: 쇼박스) is a South Korean film distribution and production company. It is one of the largest film distribution companies in South Korea, founded in 1999. Showbox is the film investment, production and distribution branch of Mediaplex, Inc., the entertainment arm of Orion Group. Its main competitors for domestic box office are CJ Entertainment, Lotte Entertainment and Next Entertainment World. Despite having very short history in the industry, they managed to have top 6 of 10 blockbusters in Korean box office history, number 1 being 2012's The Thieves.

== History ==
- June 1996: Establishment of Mediaplex Co., Ltd. to enter the movie business.
- November 1999: Establishment of Megabox to enter the movie theater business.
- January 2002: Establishment of Showbox brand and start of movie distribution investment.
- December 2002: Their first film Sex Is Zero premiers and becomes the fifth most popular film of 2002; selling 4 million tickets.
- February 2004: Taegukgi premiers and hits a new record of 11.74 million tickets sold.
- August 2005: Welcome to Dongmakgol premiers and becomes (at the time) as the fourth highest grossing South Korean film of all time; selling 8 million tickets.
- July 2006: The Host premiers and setting a new record of being (at the time) the highest grossing South Korean film of all time; selling 13 million tickets.
- July 2007: Megabox is sold to Macquarie Investment Fund.
- August 2007:D-War premiers and setting a new record of being (at the time) the highest-budgeted South Korean film of all time; selling 8.42 million tickets.
- February 2008: The Chaser premiers and sells 5 million tickets.
- July 2009: Take Off premiers and becomes the 2nd most attended film of the year in South Korea; selling 8.39 million tickets.
- February 2010: Secret Reunion premiers and becomes one of the highest grossing Korean films of 2010; selling 5.5 million tickets.
- January 2011: Detective K: Secret of the Virtuous Widow premiers and becomes the 4th best selling Korean film of 2011; selling 4.78 million tickets.
- February 2012: Nameless Gangster: Rules of the Time premiers and sells 4.71 million thousand tickets.
- July 2012: The Thieves premiers and becomes (at the time) as the fifth highest-grossing movie in Korean film history; selling 12.9 million tickets.
- May 2013: Secretly, Greatly premiers and breaks several box office records in South Korea: the highest single day opening for a domestic film, most tickets sold in one day for a domestic film, the biggest opening weekend, the highest-grossing webtoon-based film, and the fastest movie to reach the million, two million, three million, and four million marks in audience number; selling 4.71 million tickets.
- September 2013: The Face Reader premiers and became one of the highest-grossing films in South Korea in 2013; selling 9.1 million tickets.
- May 2014: A Hard Day premiers and sells 3.44 million tickets.
- February 2015: Detective K: Secret of the Lost Island premiers and the 9th highest-grossing film of 2015; selling 3.87 million tickets.
- March 2015: entered into an exclusive partnership with one of the biggest Chinese entertainment companies, Huayi Brothers, and expanding its way to China and a co-produced partnership with the Hollywood genre movie studio Blumhouse.
- June 2015: Changed the company names from Showbox Mediaplex Co., Inc. to Showbox Corporation, in a step to unify the brand name.
- March 2019: Showbox entered the drama production industry. It signed a consignment deal with generalist network JTBC, being the second film company to do so (the first being NEW).

== Releases ==
=== Films ===
Click on the 'Show' button to view this table

Year	Title	Production Country	Release date (Note: Release date in South Korea)	Production type	Notes
2002	Addicted	South Korea	October 25, 2002	Live action	Distribution (Note: In South Korea)
2002	Sex Is Zero	South Korea	December 12, 2002	Live action	Distribution
2003	Double Agent	South Korea	January 24, 2003	Live action	Distribution
2003	Garden of Heaven	South Korea	April 4, 2003	Live action	Distribution
2003	Adaptation	United States	May 5, 2003	Live action	Distribution
2003	Oh Brothers	South Korea	September 5, 2003	Live action	Distribution
2003	Underworld	United States; United Kingdom; Germany; Hungary	September 26, 2003	Live action	Import; Distribution
2003	Silver Knife	South Korea	October 24, 2003	Live action	Distribution
2003	North Korean Guys	South Korea	December 31, 2003	Live action	Distribution
2004	Ice Rain	South Korea	January 16, 2004	Live action	Distribution
2004	Spy Girl	South Korea	January 30, 2004	Live action	Provider
2004	Taegukgi	South Korea	February 5, 2004	Live action	Provider
2004	The Human Stain	United States	March 3, 2004	Live action	Import; Distribution
2004	Dance with Solitude	South Korea	March 19, 2004	Live action	Distribution
2004	The Last Wolf	South Korea	April 4, 2004	Live action	Distribution
2004	The Big Swindle	South Korea	April 15, 2004	Live action	Distribution
2004	The President's Barber	South Korea	May 5, 2004	Live action	Distribution
2004	Ong-Bak: Muay Thai Warrior	Thailand	May 26, 2004	Live action	Import; Distribution
2004	Dead Friend	South Korea	June 17, 2004	Live action	Distribution
2004	One Missed Call	Japan	September 7, 2004	Live action	Import; Distribution
2004	Temptation of Wolves	South Korea	July 22, 2004	Live action	Distribution
2004	To Catch a Virgin Ghost	South Korea	August 13, 2004	Live action	Distribution
2004	Around the World in 80 Days	United States; United Kingdom; Germany; Ireland	September 17, 2004	Live action	Import; Distribution
2004	Crying Out Love in the Center of the World	Japan	October 10, 2004	Live action	Distribution
2004	The Scarlet Letter	South Korea	October 29, 2004	Live action	Provider
2004	The Butterfly Effect	United States	November 12, 2004	Live action	Distribution
2004	Blade: Trinity	United States	December 15, 2004	Live action	Import; Distribution
2004	Shinsukki Blues	South Korea	December 30, 2004	Live action	Provider

=== Television series ===
Year	Title	Original title	Network	Associated production	Ref.
2020	Itaewon Class	이태원 클라쓰	JTBC	Zium Content; Itaewon Class Production Partners	
2025	The Witch	마녀	Channel A	Mr. Romance	
2026	Portraits of Delusion	현혹	Disney+	Magnum Nine	
TBA	Dolled Up	대세녀	TBA		
