= Kim Soo-hyun filmography =

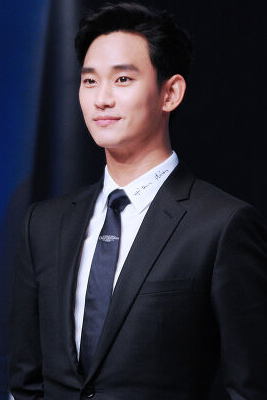
- Kim in May 2017
- Film: 6
- Television series: 17
- Hosting: 2
- Music videos: 1
- Narrating: 1

Kim Soo-hyun (born February 16, 1988) is a South Korean actor.

== Film ==
Year	Title	Role(s)	Notes	Ref.
2008	Cherry Blossom	Han Hyun-joon	Short film	
2009	Worst Friends	Kim Joon-ki	Short film	
2012	The Thieves	Zampano		
2013	Secretly, Greatly	Won Ryu-hwan / Bang Dong-gu		
2014	Miss Granny	young Mr. Park	Cameo	
2017	Real	Jang Tae-young		

== Television series ==
Year	Title	Role	Notes	Ref.
2007	Kimchi Cheese Smile	Kim Soo-hyun		
2008	Jungle Fish	Han Jae-ta		
2009	Seven Years of Love	Chun-jae		
2009	Will It Snow for Christmas?	teen Cha Kang-jin		
2009	Father's House	Kang Jae-il	Drama special	
2010	Giant	teen Lee Sung-mo		
2011	Dream High	Song Sam-dong		
2012	Moon Embracing the Sun	King Lee Hwon		
2012	Dream High 2	Song Sam-dong	Special appearance (ep. 1)	
2013–2014	My Love from the Star	Do Min-joon		
2015	The Producers	Baek Seung-chan		
2019	Hotel del Luna	Owner of Hotel Blue Moon	Special appearance (ep. 16)	
2019–2020	Crash Landing on You	Bang Dong-gu	Special appearance (ep. 10)	
2020	It's Okay to Not Be Okay	Moon Gang-tae		
2021	One Ordinary Day	Kim Hyun-soo		
2024	Queen of Tears	Baek Hyun-woo		
TBA	Knock-Off	Kim Sung-joon		

== Hosting ==
Year	Title	Ref.
2008	The Taste of Life	
2009	Boys & Girls Music Countdown	

== Music video appearance ==
Year	Title	Artist(s)	Ref.
2017	"Ending Scene"	IU	

== Narration ==
Year	Title	Ref.
2013	Documentary Special: Director Bong Joon-ho	
