= List of awards and nominations received by Kim Soo-hyun =

Kim Soo-hyun awards and nominations
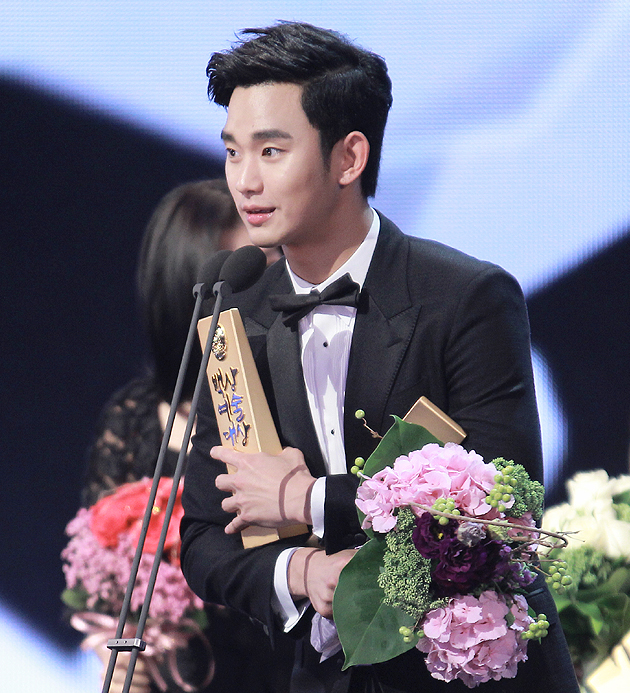
- Kim at the Baeksang Arts Awards, May 2014
Awards and nominations
Award	Wins	Nominations
APAN Star Awards	5	10
Asia Artist Awards	6	7
Asia Model Awards	1	1
Asian Television Awards	0	1
Baeksang Arts Awards	5	9
BIFF with Marie Claire Asia Star Awards	1	1
Big Ben Awards	1	1
Blue Dragon Film Awards	1	2
Brand of the Year Awards	2	2
Buil Film Awards	0	1
Busan International Advertising Festival	2	2
China the Wind from the East Entertainment Awards	1	1
Cosmo Beauty Awards	1	1
Cyworld Digital Music Awards	1	1
Grand Bell Awards	2	2
Huading Awards	1	1
InStyle Star Icon Awards	2	2
International Drama Festival in Tokyo	1	1
KBS Drama Awards	6	11
Korea Best Dresser Swan Awards	1	1
Korea Broadcasting Awards	1	1
Korea Drama Awards	8	12
Korea Film Actors' Association Awards	1	1
Korea First Brand Awards	1	1
Korea Youth Film Festival	1	1
MBC Drama Awards	2	4
Mnet 20's Choice Awards	2	4
Nickelodeon Korea Kids' Choice Awards	1	1
Puchon International Fantastic Film Festival	1	1
SBS Drama Awards	5	5
Seoul International Drama Awards	2	3
Seoul Success Awards	1	1
Sky PerfecTV! Awards	1	1
Soompi Awards	1	1
Sseoljeon Awards	1	1
Style Icon Awards	2	4
TVCF Awards	1	1

Totals (Note: Certain award groups do not simply award one winner. They acknowledge several different recipients, have runners-up, and have third place. Since this is a specific recognition and is different from losing an award, runner-up mentions are considered wins in this award tally. For simplification and to avoid errors, each award in this list has been presumed to have had a prior nomination.)
- Wins: 72
- Nominations: 101

This is a list of awards and nominations received by South Korean actor Kim Soo-hyun. Kim has won numerous accolades throughout the course of his career, including the Best Actor – Television at 48th Baeksang Arts Awards for his acting in the historical drama series Moon Embracing the Sun.

== Awards and nominations ==
Name of the award ceremony, year presented, category, nominee of the award, and the result of the nomination
Award ceremony	Year	Category	Nominee / Work	Result	Ref.
APAN Star Awards	2012	Excellence Award, Actor	Moon Embracing the Sun	Won	
APAN Star Awards	2014	Hallyu Star Award	My Love from the Star	Won	
APAN Star Awards	2014	Top Excellence Award, Actor in a Miniseries	My Love from the Star	Won	
APAN Star Awards	2015	Grand Prize (Daesang) (Note: A Daesang (Korean: 대상), which translates to "Grand Prize", is the highest honor given out at South Korean award ceremonies.)	The Producers	Won	
APAN Star Awards	2015	Top Excellence Award, Actor in a Miniseries	The Producers	Nominated	
APAN Star Awards	2021	Popular Star Award, Actor	It's Okay to Not Be Okay	Won	
APAN Star Awards	2021	KT Seezn Star Award	Kim Soo-hyun	Nominated	
APAN Star Awards	2021	Top Excellence Award, Actor in a Miniseries	It's Okay to Not Be Okay	Nominated	
APAN Star Awards	2022	Top Excellence Award, Actor in an OTT Drama	One Ordinary Day	Nominated	
APAN Star Awards	2024	Top Excellence Award, Actor in a Miniseries	Queen of Tears	Nominated	
Asia Artist Awards	2020	AAA Hot Issue Award	Kim Soo-hyun	Won	
Asia Artist Awards	2020	Actor of the Year – Drama (Daesang)	It's Okay to Not Be Okay	Won	
Asia Artist Awards	2024	Artist of the Year – Actor (Daesang)	Queen of Tears	Won	
Asia Artist Awards	2024	Best Artist Award – TV / Film	Kim Soo-hyun	Won	
Asia Artist Awards	2024	Fabulous Award	Kim Soo-hyun	Won	
Asia Artist Awards	2024	Hot Trend Award	Kim Soo-hyun	Won	
Asia Artist Awards	2026	Popularity Award – Actor	Kim Soo-hyun	Pending	
Asia Model Awards	2011	CF Model Award	Kim Soo-hyun	Won	
Asian Television Awards	2022	Best Leading Male Performance – Digital	One Ordinary Day	Nominated	
Baeksang Arts Awards	2011	Best New Actor – Television	Dream High	Nominated	
Baeksang Arts Awards	2012	Best Actor – Television	Moon Embracing the Sun	Won	
Baeksang Arts Awards	2014	Best New Actor – Film	Secretly, Greatly	Won	
Baeksang Arts Awards	2014	Most Popular Actor – Film	Secretly, Greatly	Won	
Baeksang Arts Awards	2014	Most Popular Actor – Television	My Love from the Star	Won	
Baeksang Arts Awards	2014	Best Actor – Television	My Love from the Star	Nominated	
Baeksang Arts Awards	2021	Best Actor – Television	It's Okay to Not Be Okay	Nominated	
Baeksang Arts Awards	2024	Best Actor – Television	Queen of Tears	Nominated	
Baeksang Arts Awards	2024	Most Popular Actor – Television	Queen of Tears	Won	
BIFF with Marie Claire Asia Star Awards	2014	Asia Star Award	Kim Soo-hyun	Won	
Big Ben Awards	2019	Global Ten Outstanding Young Persons	Kim Soo-hyun	Won	
Blue Dragon Film Awards	2012	Popular Star Award	The Thieves	Won	
Blue Dragon Film Awards	2012	Best New Actor	The Thieves	Nominated	
Brand of the Year Awards (Note: Established in 2003, the Brand of the Year Awards is an awards ceremony based on nationwide surveys hosted by the Korea Consumer Brand Committee and organised by the Korea Consumer Forum.)	2024	Actor of the Year (Drama) – Domestic Category	Queen of Tears	Won	
Brand of the Year Awards	2024	Actor of the Year (Drama) – Vietnam Category	Queen of Tears	Won	
Buil Film Awards	2012	Best New Actor	The Thieves	Nominated	
Busan International Advertising Festival	2015	Best Korean Spokesmodel in China	Kim Soo-hyun	Won	
Busan International Advertising Festival	2016	China's Favourite Korean Advertising Model	Kim Soo-hyun	Won	
China the Wind from the East Entertainment Awards	2015	South Korean Entertainment Influencer Award	Kim Soo-hyun	Won	
Cosmo Beauty Awards	2013	Dream Icon Award	Kim Soo-hyun	Won	
Cyworld Digital Music Awards	2011	Song of the Month (February)	"Dreaming" (Dream High)	Won	
Grand Bell Awards	2013	Best New Actor	Secretly, Greatly	Won	
Grand Bell Awards	2015	Popularity Award	Kim Soo-hyun	Won	
Huading Awards	2015	Global Best TV Actor	My Love From the Star	Won	
InStyle Star Icon Awards	2016	Best Actor (Drama)	Kim Soo-hyun	Won	
InStyle Star Icon Awards	2016	Fashionista Award	Kim Soo-hyun	Won	
International Drama Festival in Tokyo	2014	Best Actor in Asia	Kim Soo-hyun	Won	
KBS Drama Awards	2011	Best Couple	Kim Soo-hyun (with Bae Suzy); Dream High	Won	
KBS Drama Awards	2011	Best New Actor	Dream High	Won	
KBS Drama Awards	2011	Popularity Award, Actor	Dream High	Won	
KBS Drama Awards	2011	Netizen Award, Actor	Dream High	Nominated	
KBS Drama Awards	2015	Best Couple	Kim Soo-hyun (with Cha Tae-hyun and Gong Hyo-jin); The Producers	Won	
KBS Drama Awards	2015	Grand Prize (Daesang)	The Producers	Won	
KBS Drama Awards	2015	Netizen Award, Actor	The Producers	Won	
KBS Drama Awards	2015	Best Couple	Kim Soo-hyun (with Gong Hyo-jin); The Producers	Nominated	
KBS Drama Awards	2015	Best Couple	Kim Soo-hyun (with IU); The Producers	Nominated	
KBS Drama Awards	2015	Excellence Award, Actor in a Miniseries	The Producers	Nominated	
KBS Drama Awards	2015	Top Excellence Award, Actor	The Producers	Nominated	
Korea Best Dresser Swan Awards	2011	Best Dresser Male Artist	Kim Soo-hyun	Won	
Korea Broadcasting Awards	2012	Best Actor	Moon Embracing the Sun	Won	
Korea Drama Awards	2011	Best New Actor	Dream High	Won	
Korea Drama Awards	2011	Most Popular Actor	Dream High	Won	
Korea Drama Awards	2012	Grand Prize (Daesang)	Moon Embracing the Sun	Nominated	
Korea Drama Awards	2014	Grand Prize (Daesang)	My Love From the Star	Won	
Korea Drama Awards	2014	Hallyu Star Award	My Love From the Star	Won	
Korea Drama Awards	2015	Grand Prize (Daesang)	The Producers	Won	
Korea Drama Awards	2015	Hallyu Star Award	The Producers	Won	
Korea Drama Awards	2024	Best Couple Award	Kim Soo-hyun (with Kim Ji-won); Queen of Tears	Won	
Korea Drama Awards	2024	Global Star Award	Queen of Tears	Won	
Korea Drama Awards	2024	Best OST Award	"Way Home"; Queen of Tears	Nominated	
Korea Drama Awards	2024	Hot Star Award (Male)	Queen of Tears	Nominated	
Korea Drama Awards	2024	Grand Prize (Daesang)	Queen of Tears	Nominated	
Korea Film Actors' Association Awards	2015	Most Popular Star Award	Kim Soo-hyun	Won	
Korea First Brand Awards (Note: Hosted by the Korea Consumer Brand Committee and the Korea Consumer Forum, the Korea First Brand Awards bases its winners on a nationwide South Korean survey.)	2025	Best Actor – Vietnam Category	Queen of Tears	Won	
Korea Youth Film Festival	2012	Popular New Actor	The Thieves	Won	
MBC Drama Awards	2012	Popularity Award, Actor	Moon Embracing the Sun	Won	
MBC Drama Awards	2012	Top Excellence Award, Actor in a Miniseries	Moon Embracing the Sun	Won	
MBC Drama Awards	2012	Best Couple Award	Kim Soo-hyun (with Han Ga-in); Moon Embracing the Sun	Nominated	
MBC Drama Awards	2012	Best Couple Award	Kim Soo-hyun (with Jung Eun-pyo); Moon Embracing the Sun	Nominated	
Mnet 20's Choice Awards	2011	Hot Male Drama Star	Dream High	Nominated	
Mnet 20's Choice Awards	2012	20's Blue Carpet Popularity Award	Kim Soo-hyun	Won	
Mnet 20's Choice Awards	2012	20's Drama Star – Male	Moon Embracing the Sun	Won	
Mnet 20's Choice Awards	2013	20's Movie Star – Male	Secretly Greatly	Nominated	
Nickelodeon Korea Kids' Choice Awards	2012	Favorite Actor	Moon Embracing the Sun	Won	
Puchon International Fantastic Film Festival	2013	Men's Fantasia Award	Secretly, Greatly	Won	
SBS Drama Awards	2010	New Star Award	Giant	Won	
SBS Drama Awards	2014	Best Couple Award	Kim Soo-hyun (with Jun Ji-hyun); My Love From the Star	Won	
SBS Drama Awards	2014	Netizen Popularity Award	My Love From the Star	Won	
SBS Drama Awards	2014	Top 10 Stars	My Love From the Star	Won	
SBS Drama Awards	2014	Top Excellence Award, Actor in a Mid-length Drama	My Love From the Star	Won	
Seoul International Drama Awards	2014	Best Korean Actor	My Love From the Star	Won	
Seoul International Drama Awards	2014	People's Choice Popular Actor	My Love From the Star	Won	
Seoul International Drama Awards	2024	Asia Star Popularity Award	Queen of Tears	Nominated	
Seoul Success Awards	2024	Netizen Actor Star Award	Kim Soo-hyun	Won	
Sky PerfecTV! Awards (Japan)	2011	Hallyu Award	Kim Soo-hyun	Won	
Soompi Awards	2016	Actor of the Year	The Producers	Won	
Sseoljeon Awards	2014	Best Actor	My Love from the Star	Won	
Style Icon Awards	2011	New Icon	Kim Soo-hyun	Won	
Style Icon Awards	2012	Style Icon	Kim Soo-hyun	Nominated	
Style Icon Awards	2013	Style Icon	Kim Soo-hyun	Nominated	
Style Icon Awards	2014	Style Icon	Kim Soo-hyun	Won	
TVCF Awards	2013	Model of the Year	Kim Soo-hyun	Won	

== Other accolades ==
=== State and cultural honors ===
Name of country or organization, year given, and name of honor
Country or organization	Year	Honor	Ref.
Institute of National Brand Promotion (Note: Honors are given at the National Brand Awards, to acknowledge individuals and businesses who make an exceptional contribution to raising South Korea's brand image.)	2015	National Brand Award Grand Prize – Culture Sector (Daesang)	
Korean Popular Culture and Arts Awards (Note: Honors are given at the Korean Popular Culture and Arts Awards, arranged by the Korea Creative Content Agency and hosted by the Ministry of Culture, Sports and Tourism. They are awarded to those who have contributed to the arts and South Korea's pop culture.)	2012	Minister of Culture, Sports and Tourism Commendation	
Korean Popular Culture and Arts Awards	2014	Prime Minister's Commendation	
National Tax Service (Note: Honors are given at the Taxpayers' Day ceremony.)	2015	Exemplary Taxpayer Commendation	
National Tax Service	2023	Presidential Commendation	
Newsis K-Expo Cultural Awards (Note: Established in 2019 and co-sponsored by Korea's Ministry of Culture, Sports and Tourism, Ministry of Foreign Affairs, Korea Creative Content Agency, Seoul Metropolitan Council and the Seoul Tourism Organization, it awards cultural icons, businesses, and individuals who have contributed greatly to Hallyu, the Korean wave.)	2024	Minister of Culture, Sports and Tourism Award	

=== Listicles ===
Name of publisher, year listed, name of listicle, and placement
Publisher	Year	Listicle	Placement	Ref.
Cine21	2024	Most Influential Actors (Series)	1st	
Cine21	2024	Actor with Impressive Performance in 2024	3rd	
Forbes	2012	Korea Power Celebrity 40	39th	
Forbes	2013	Korea Power Celebrity 40	4th	
Forbes	2014	Korea Power Celebrity 40	17th	
Forbes	2015	Korea Power Celebrity 40	2nd	
Forbes	2016	Korea Power Celebrity 40	5th	
Forbes	2021	Korea Power Celebrity 40	20th	
Forbes	2022	Korea Power Celebrity 40	21st	
Forbes	2016	30 Under 30 – Asia	Included	
Gallup Korea	2014	Favorite Television Actor	1st	
Gallup Korea	2024	Favorite Television Actor	1st	
Gallup Korea	2012	Television Actor of the Year	4th	
Gallup Korea	2013	Television Actor of the Year	10th	
Gallup Korea	2014	Television Actor of the Year	1st	
Gallup Korea	2015	Television Actor of the Year	2nd	
Gallup Korea	2024	Television Actor of the Year	2nd	
Gallup Korea	2013	Film Actor of the Year	8th	
Gallup Korea	2014	Film Actor of the Year	10th	
Gallup Korea	2024	Best Television Couple of the Past 10 Years	3rd (Note: With Kim Ji-won for Queen of Tears (2024))	
Korean Film Council	2021	Korean Actors 200 (Note: Introduces 200 actors that best represent the present and future of Korean cinema to the people in the film industry all over the world.)	Included	
