= Worst Friends =

Worst Friends may refer to:

- Worst Friends (2009 film), a 2009 Korean film
- Worst Friends (2014 film), a 2014 American film
