= Another Way =

Another Way may refer to:

== Music ==
- Another Way (Kim Soo-hyun song), a 2012 song by Kim Soo-hyun
- Another Way (album), a 2003 album by Teenage Bottlerocket
- "Another Way" (Tevin Campbell song), a 1999 song by Tevin Campbell
- "Another Way" (Gigi D'Agostino song), a 1999 song by Gigi D'Agostino
- "Another Way", a 2022 song by Au5

== Film ==
- Another Way (1982 film), a Hungarian film
- Another Way (2015 film), a South Korean film

== Television ==
- "Another Way" (Adventure Time), an episode from the third season of Adventure Time
