= Kim Ji-won =

South Korean actress (born 1992)

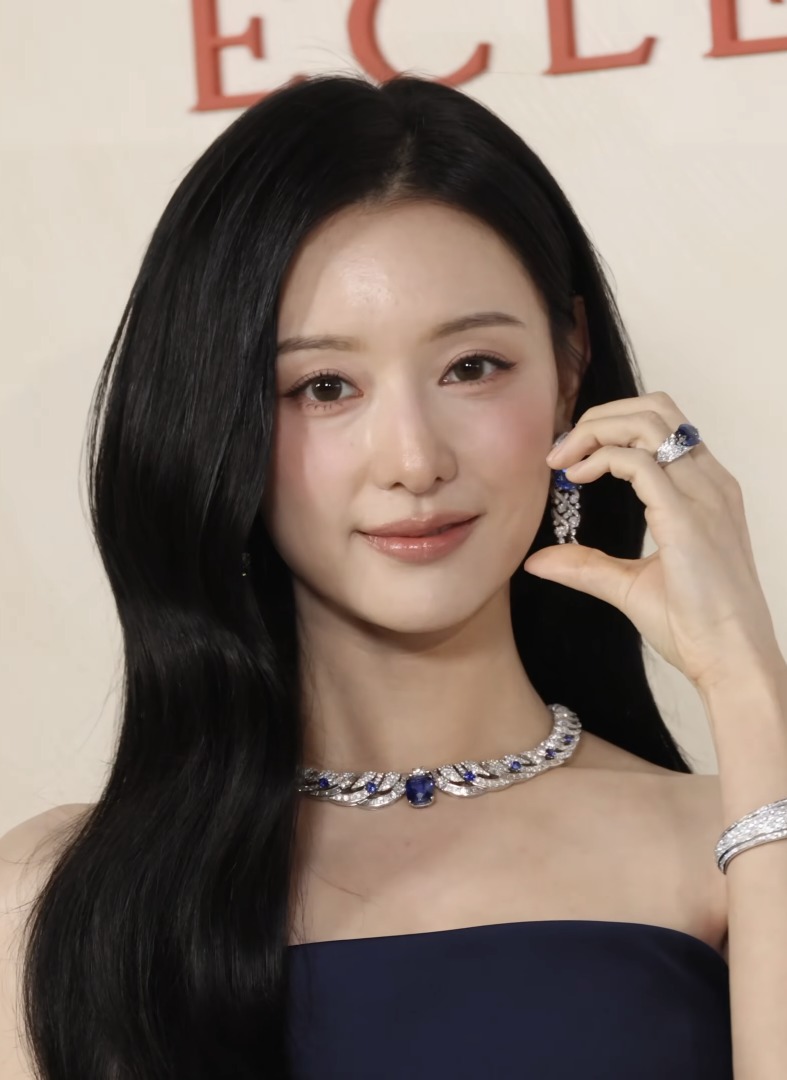
- Kim in May 2026
- Born: October 19, 1992 (age 34); Seoul, South Korea
- Education: Dongguk University (B.A. in Theatre Studies)
- Occupation: Actress
- Years active: 2010–present
- Agent: HighZium Studio

Korean name
- Hangul: 김지원
- RR: Gim Jiwon
- MR: Kim Chiwŏn
- Website: highziumstudio.com

Signature
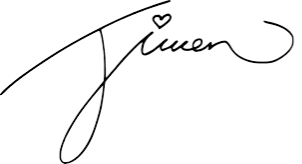

Kim Ji-won (Korean: 김지원; born October 19, 1992) is a South Korean actress. She gained recognition through her roles in the television series The Heirs (2013) and Descendants of the Sun (2016), both written by Kim Eun-sook. She later established herself in leading roles in Fight for My Way (2017), Arthdal Chronicles (2019), My Liberation Notes (2022), and Queen of Tears (2024), the latter of which became tvN's highest-rated series at the time. These roles contributed to her prominence as a hallyu figure.

== Early life and education ==
Kim Ji-won was born on October 19, 1992, in Geumcheon District, Seoul, South Korea, as the younger of two daughters. She developed an interest in acting during elementary school and participated in school plays. During middle school, she played the piano at church and participated in Christmas performances. She has stated that she is a Christian.

During her first year of middle school, Kim spent nearly a year in Chicago, Illinois, United States, living with maternal relatives. After returning to South Korea, she was required to repeat a school year before re-enrolling. She later left formal education and passed the General Educational Development (GED) examination before entering high school.

In 2007, Kim was scouted on the street and signed with Lion Media, where she trained for three years in singing, dancing, and acting. In 2008, while still a trainee, she worked as a keyboardist and backing vocalist for Younha and appeared in the music video for the song "Gossip Boy". She was initially set to debut as a singer under the stage name "JessicaK", but ultimately chose acting instead.

Following her 2010 debut, she enrolled in the Department of Theatre at Dongguk University in 2011, majoring in acting.

== Career ==
=== 2010–2012: Early career ===
Kim Ji-won made her acting debut in the 2011 romance omnibus film Romantic Heaven. She gained attention for her role in the sitcom High Kick: Revenge of the Short Legged. She later appeared in the musical drama What's Up. In 2012, Kim starred in the high school series To the Beautiful You, and appeared in the horror anthology film Horror Stories.

=== 2013–2016: Breakthrough ===
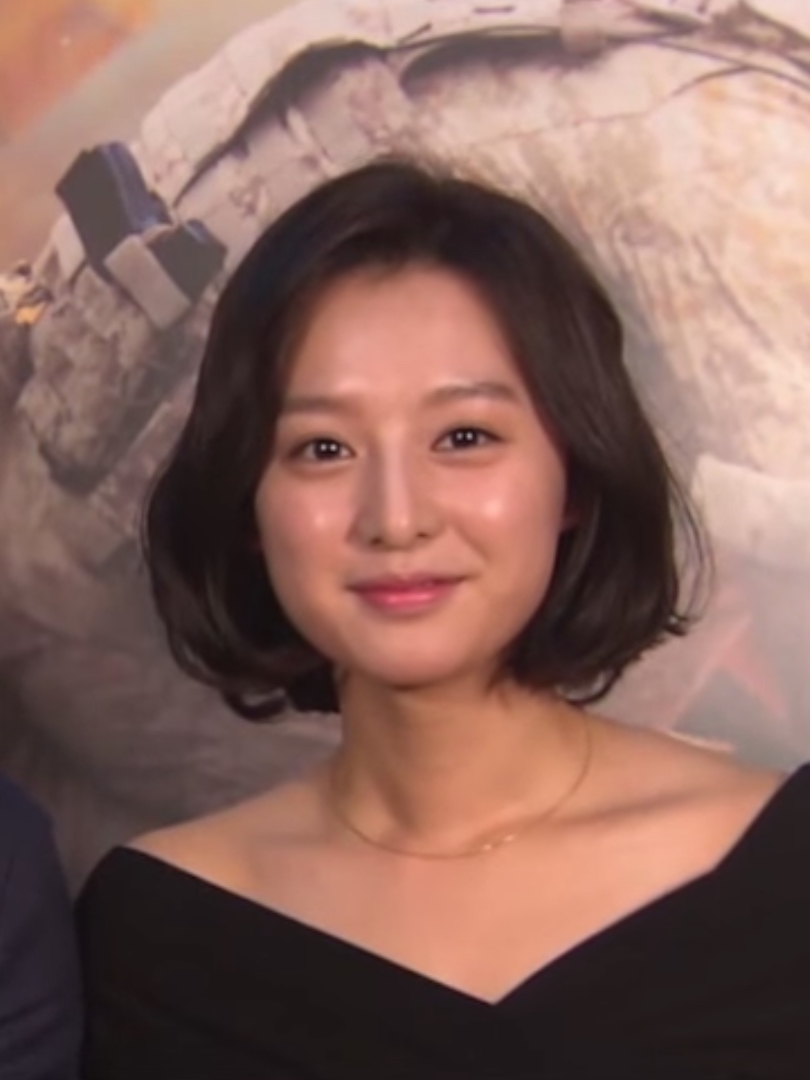
Kim at the press conference for Descendants of the Sun in 2016

In 2013, Kim appeared in the horror omnibus film Horror Stories 2, and the KBS Drama Special Waiting for Love. Later that year, she starred in the teen romantic drama The Heirs, portraying Yoo Rachel, an heiress to a chaebol family. The series recorded a peak viewership rating of 28.6% and garnered over one billion views on Youku. Kim received the New Star Award at the 2013 SBS Drama Awards for her performance.

In 2014, Kim portrayed a high school student and webtoon artist in the crime thriller Gap-dong. She also appeared in a supporting role in the KBS Drama Special The Reason I'm Getting Married. In December, she signed a contract with King Kong Entertainment.

In 2015, Kim starred in the romance web series One Sunny Day, portraying a woman who meets a stranger while traveling to Jeju Island. Later that year, she made a cameo appearance in the drama Hidden Identity.

In 2016, Kim starred in the military romance drama Descendants of the Sun, portraying Yoon Myung-joo, a first lieutenant and army surgeon. The series recorded a nationwide viewership rating of 38.8% in its finale and won the Grand Prize – Television at the 52nd Baeksang Arts Awards. It also garnered more than 2.5 billion views on iQIYI and increased Kim's international visibility. Kim won the Excellence Award at the 2016 KBS Drama Awards and the Best Supporting Actress award at the 5th APAN Star Awards for her performance in the series.

=== 2017–2023: Leading roles ===
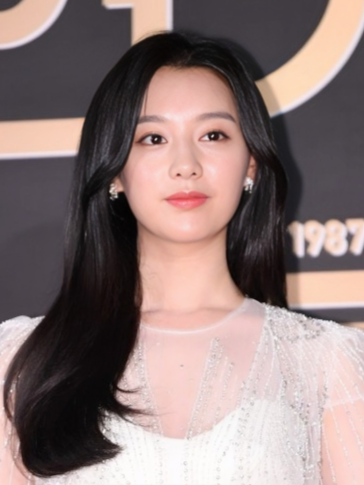
Kim at the 2017 KBS Drama Awards

In 2017, Kim starred in her first leading role in the romantic comedy drama Fight for My Way, portraying Choi Ae-ra, a woman who aspires to become an announcer. The series was noted for its portrayal of young adults facing career challenges and recorded its highest nationwide viewership rating of 13.8% in its final episode. Kim received the Excellence Award at the 2017 KBS Drama Awards.

In 2018, Kim starred in the period comedy-mystery film Detective K: Secret of the Living Dead, portraying a woman with memory loss involved in an investigation. That same year, she made a cameo appearance in the historical drama Mr. Sunshine.

In 2019, Kim starred in the historical fantasy drama Arthdal Chronicles, portraying Tanya, the spiritual successor of the Wahan tribe's priesthood. In December, Kim's contract with King Kong Entertainment expired, and she chose not to renew it.

In February 2020, Kim signed with Salt Entertainment. Later that year, she starred in the romance web series Lovestruck in the City as Lee Eun-oh, a freelance marketer who uses the alias Yoon Seon-ah. For the role, Kim underwent surfing training to overcome her childhood aquaphobia.

In 2022, Kim starred in the slice-of-life drama My Liberation Notes, portraying Yeom Mi-jeong, an introverted office worker struggling to escape her monotonous life. She was nominated for Best Actress – Television at the 59th Baeksang Arts Awards for her performance in the series. In June, Kim's contract with Salt Entertainment expired, and she chose not to renew it. In September, she signed with HighZium Studio.

=== 2024–present: Established actress ===
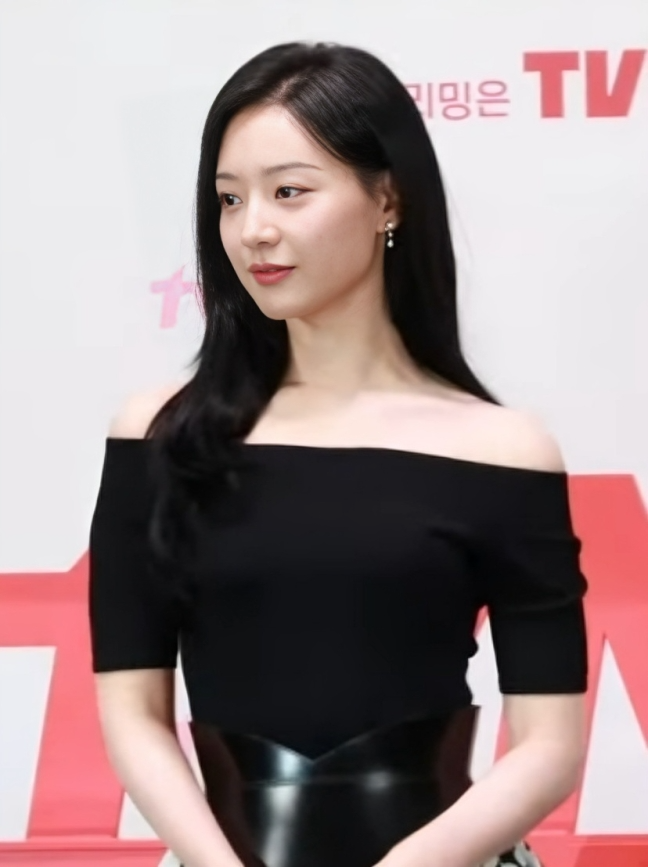
Kim at the press conference for Queen of Tears in 2024

In 2024, Kim starred in the romantic comedy drama Queen of Tears, portraying Hong Hae-in, a third-generation chaebol heiress and CEO of Queens Department Store. The series recorded a nationwide viewership rating of 24.850% in its final episode and became the highest-rated tvN drama in history. It also ranked on Netflix's Global Top 10 Non-English TV Shows chart for 15 consecutive weeks. Kim ranked third in Gallup Korea's Television Actor of the Year survey. She also received the Prime Minister's Commendation at the Korean Popular Culture and Arts Awards.

In 2026, Kim starred in the medical noir drama Doctor X: Mafia in White as Gye Su-jeong, also known as Doctor X, a genius surgeon with a dark past. The series recorded its highest nationwide viewership rating of 19.5%, ranking fifth among the highest-rated Friday–Saturday dramas in SBS history.

== Public image ==
Korean media highlighted Kim's clear diction and pronunciation, earning her the nickname "Diction Fairy". Her aegyo scene in Fight for My Way gained attention on social media and inspired a dubbing challenge. Following her performance in Queen of Tears, several media outlets referred to her as "Queen of Romantic Comedy". Korean media have also described Kim as a prominent figure in the Korean Wave. Kim ranked third in Gallup Korea's Television Actor of the Year in both 2024 and 2025.

Kim maintains a private life and has a limited presence on social media. In an interview with Cosmopolitan, she stated, "I tend to separate my work and private life. When people watch the dramas I appear in, I want them to focus solely on the character."

== Other ventures ==
=== Ambassadorship ===
On February 8, 2025, Kim was selected as the ambassador for Orange Run 2025, a charity marathon festival held in collaboration with the Korea Welfare Service and Hanwha General Insurance to celebrate International Women's Day.

=== Endorsements ===
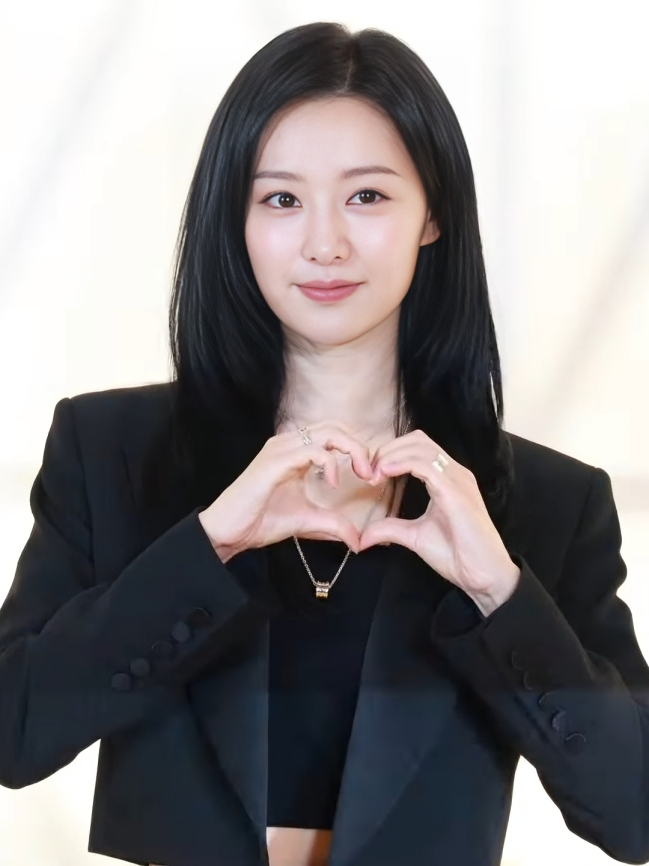
Kim attended the Bulgari event held in Seoul in 2024

Kim began her advertising career in 2010 as an endorser for LG Electronics' Cyon Lollipop 2 alongside Bigbang. From 2014 to 2017, she served as a brand ambassador for the skincare brand Dr.G. In 2016, following her appearance in Descendants of the Sun, she was referred to by media outlets as the "CF Queen" after securing endorsement deals with more than ten brands. From 2017 to 2021, she served as a global ambassador for the skincare brand Mediheal.

In 2024, she became a brand ambassador for Bulgari, becoming its first Korean ambassador for jewelry, watches, and fragrance. She also served as a global ambassador for LG H&H's luxury cosmetics brand The Whoo, and was appointed brand ambassador for the jewelry brand Stonehenge and the Italian luxury outerwear brand Duvetica.

=== Philanthropy ===
In February 2014, Kim participated in Vogue Girl's "Pink Wings" campaign, with proceeds donated to support low-income families. On November 29, 2016, she joined the Korean Committee for UNICEF's "We Action" child protection campaign. During the COVID-19 pandemic, Kim donated ₩20 million to World Share in February 2020 to support medical staff and patients at Keimyung University Dongsan Hospital in Daegu. The following month, she served as a voice donor for MBC Radio's "Citizen Support Project" for people affected by the pandemic.

In June 2022, Kim volunteered for Big Issue, a magazine that supports people experiencing homelessness. In October 2024, she took part in W Korea's "Love Your W" breast cancer awareness campaign. On March 27, 2025, Kim donated ₩50 million to the Hope Bridge National Disaster Relief Association to aid victims of the 2025 South Korea wildfires.

On August 7, 2026, Kim Ji-won donated KRW 100 million to support ward environment improvements at Seoul National University Children's Hospital and medical expenses for low-income patients. The donation will be used to help reduce the financial burden of treatment for children with severe, rare, and intractable diseases and their families who travel from across South Korea, as well as to provide a safer and more comfortable environment for treatment.

== Filmography ==
=== Film ===
Year	Title	Role	Notes	Ref.
2011	Romantic Heaven	Choi Mi-mi		
2012	Horror Stories	Kim Ji-won	Segment: "Beginning"	
2013	Horror Stories 2	Sa Tan-hee	Segment: "The Escape"	
2018	Detective K: Secret of the Living Dead	Wol-young		

=== Television series ===
Key
†	Denotes television productions that have not yet been released

Year	Title	Role	Notes	Ref.
2011	High Kick: Revenge of the Short Legged	Kim Ji-won		
2011	What's Up	Park Tae-yi		
2012	To the Beautiful You	Seol Han-na		
2013	Waiting for Love	Choi Sae-rom	KBS Drama Special	
2013	The Heirs	Yoo Rachel		
2014	The Reason I'm Getting Married	Kim Ji-young	KBS Drama Special	
2014	Gap-dong	Ma Ji-wool		
2015	Hidden Identity	Min Tae-hee	Cameo (Episodes 1–2, 9–10)	
2016	Descendants of the Sun	Yoon Myung-joo		
2017	Fight for My Way	Choi Ae-ra		
2018	Mr. Sunshine	Kim Hui-jin	Cameo (Episode 1)	
2019	Arthdal Chronicles	Tan-ya	Season 1	
2020–2021	Lovestruck in the City	Lee Eun-oh / Yoon Seon-ah		
2022	My Liberation Notes	Yeom Mi-jeong		
2024	Queen of Tears	Hong Hae-in		
2026	Doctor X: Mafia in White	Gye Su-jeong / Doctor X		
TBA	Detective Park Mi-ok †	Park Mi-ok	Netflix Series	

=== Web series ===
Year	Title	Role	Ref.
2014	One Sunny Day	Kim Ji-ho	

=== Hosting ===
Year	Title	Notes	Ref.
2016	30th KBS Drama Awards	With Jun Hyun-moo and Park Bo-gum	

=== Music video appearances ===
Year	Title	Artist	Ref.
2008	"Gossip Boy"	Younha	
2010	"Lollipop Pt. 2"	BigBang	

== Discography ==
=== Singles ===
Title	Year	Album	Ref.
"Pick a Star from the Sky"	2010	OranC Commercial	
"Over the Rainbow"	2012	High Kick: Revenge of the Short Legged OST	

== Accolades ==
=== Awards and nominations ===
Name of the award ceremony, year presented, category, nominee of the award, and the result of the nomination
Award Ceremony	Year	Category	Nominee / Work	Result	Ref.
APAN Star Awards	2016	Best Supporting Actress	Descendants of the Sun	Won	
APAN Star Awards	2022	Excellence Award, Actress in a Miniseries	My Liberation Notes	Nominated	
APAN Star Awards	2024	Top Excellence Award, Actress in a Miniseries	Queen of Tears	Nominated	
Asia Artist Awards	2016	Best Celebrity Award, Actress	Kim Ji-won	Won	
Baeksang Arts Awards	2023	Best Actress – Television	My Liberation Notes	Nominated	
Brand of the Year Awards	2024	Actress of the Year – Television (Domestic)	Queen of Tears	Won	
Brand of the Year Awards	2024	Actress of the Year (Vietnam)	Queen of Tears	Won	
Elle Style Awards	2016	Young Icon Award	Kim Ji-won	Won	
Fundex Awards	2024	Best Actress – Television	Queen of Tears	Won	
Global Film & Television Huading Awards	2023	Best Global Leading Actress – Television	My Liberation Notes	Nominated	
iMBC Awards	2025	Best Actress	Queen of Tears	Won	
KBS Drama Awards	2016	Best Couple Award	Kim Ji-won (with Jin Goo); Descendants of the Sun	Won	
KBS Drama Awards	2016	Best New Actress	Descendants of the Sun	Won	
KBS Drama Awards	2016	Excellence Award, Actress in a Miniseries	Descendants of the Sun	Won	
KBS Drama Awards	2017	Best Couple Award	Kim Ji-won (with Park Seo-joon); Fight for My Way	Won	
KBS Drama Awards	2017	Excellence Award, Actress in a Miniseries	Fight for My Way	Won	
KBS Drama Awards	2017	Popularity Award, Actress	Kim Ji-won	Won	
Korea Drama Awards	2019	Excellence Award, Actress	Arthdal Chronicles	Nominated	
Korea Drama Awards	2024	Best Couple Award	Kim Ji-won (with Kim Soo-hyun); Queen of Tears	Won	
Korea Drama Awards	2024	Popularity Award, Actress	Kim Ji-won	Won	
Korea Drama Awards	2024	Top Excellence Award, Actress	Queen of Tears	Nominated	
Korea First Brand Awards	2025	Best Actress (Vietnam)	Queen of Tears	Won	
SBS Drama Awards	2013	New Star Award	The Heirs	Won	
Seoul International Drama Awards	2018	Outstanding Korean Actress	Fight for My Way	Nominated	

=== State and cultural honors ===
Name of country or organization, year given, and name of honor
Country or Organization	Year	Honor	Ref.
Korean Popular Culture and Arts Awards	2025	Prime Minister's Commendation	

=== Listicles ===
Name of publisher, year listed, name of listicle, and placement
Publisher	Year	Listicle	Placement	Ref.
Forbes	2025	Korea Power Celebrity 40	23rd	
Gallup Korea	2024	Gallup Korea's Favorite Television Actor	2nd (Note: In the survey, Kim Ji-won tied with Namkoong Min, each receiving 2.9% of the votes.)	
Gallup Korea	2024	Gallup Korea's Television Actor of the Year	3rd	
Gallup Korea	2025	Gallup Korea's Television Actor of the Year	3rd	
