= One Sunny Day =

- Promotional poster
- Also known as: A Good Day
- Genre: Romance
- Directed by: Kwon Hyuk-chan
- Starring: So Ji-sub; Kim Ji-won
- Country of origin: South Korea
- Original language: Korean
- No. of episodes: 10

Production
- Running time: 12 minutes
- Production company: Hwa&Dam Pictures

Original release
- Network: Line TV
- Release: December 19, 2014 – January 10, 2015

One Sunny Day (Korean: 좋은 날; RR: Joeun nal) is a 2014 South Korean web series that aired on Line TV from December 19, 2014 to January 10, 2015 for 10 episodes. It was only available on Line TV to Thailand audiences and was not aired in South Korea, but was later released on DramaFever.

== Plot ==
Kim Ji-ho (So Ji-sub) is a broken hearted man who winds up in Jeju Island for a work project but he keeps running into a girl (Kim Ji-won). Both of them get robbed and have to sleep in the same guest house. They depend on each other for a day as his wallet and her phone got stolen. As they stay in Jeju Island, she heals his broken heart and they fall in love.

== Cast ==
- So Ji-sub as Kim Ji-ho
- Kim Ji-won as The Girl (Kim Ji-ho)
- Lee Jong-hyuk as Young-ho
- Lim Ju-eun as Ji-ho's ex-girlfriend
- Lee Jong-hyun as Couple Guy
- Mimi as Couple Girl
- Baek Seung-hee as Couple Girl
- Ha Jae-sook
- Kim Mi-kyung
