= Boys & Girls Music Countdown =

- Also known as: Sonyeon Sonyeo Gayo Baekso

Production
- Running time: 1 hour Mondays to Fridays at 17:00 (KST)
- Production company: CJ E&M

Original release
- Network: Mnet
- Release: November 16, 2007 – February 12, 2010

Boys & Girls Music Countdown (Korean: 소년소녀가요백서; RR: Sonyeonsonyeogayobaekseo) was a South Korean music television program broadcast by Mnet. It aired from 2007 to 2010 every Mondays to Fridays at 17:00 KST to 18:00 KST.

== Past MC ==
Season	Boy	Girl	Broadcast period
1	Kim Hye-seong	Tiffany	15 November 2007 – 13 June 2008
2	Kim Hye-seong	Han Seung-yeon	30 June 2008 – 2 January 2009
3	Kim Soo-hyun	Han Seung-yeon	12 January 2009 – 8 May 2009
4	Shin Dong-ho	Park Eun-bin	11 May 2009- 6 November 2009
5	Shin Dong-ho	Jun Hyo-seong	9 November 2009 – 12 February 2010
