= Kim Soo-hyun =

South Korean actor (born 1988)

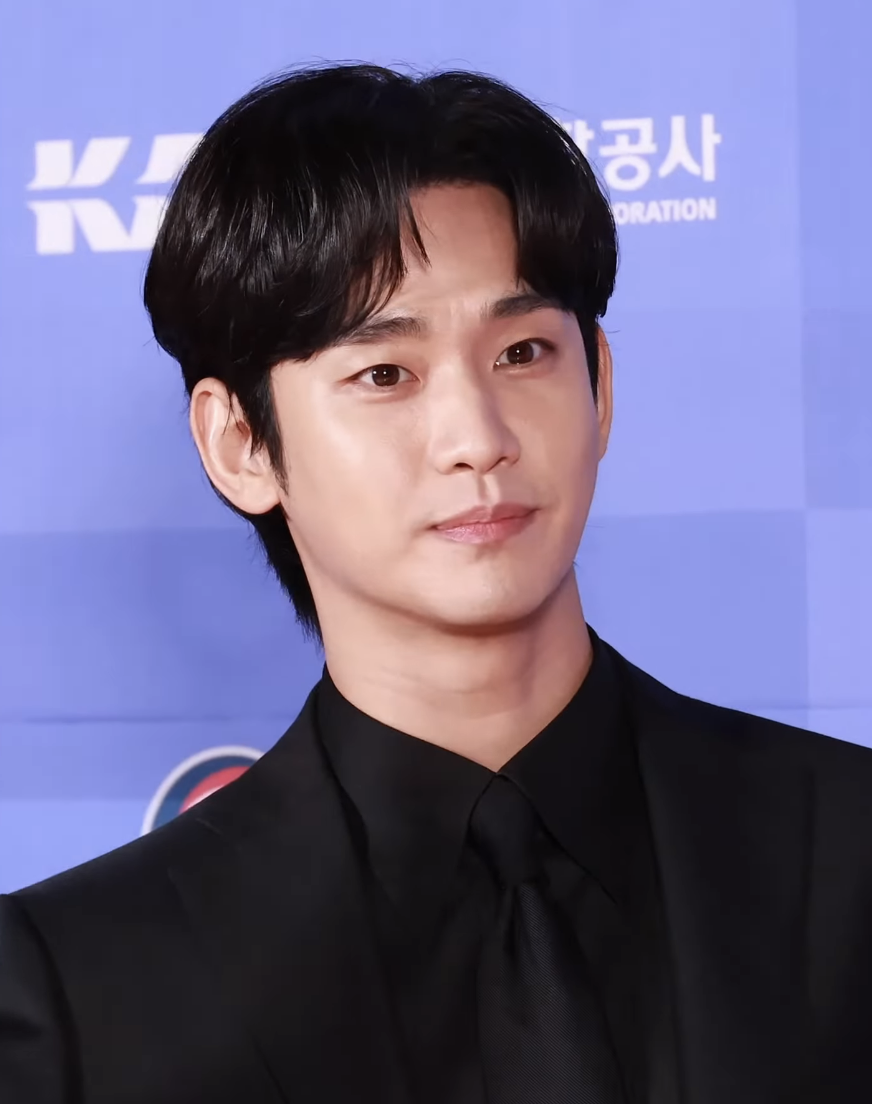
- Kim in August 2024
- Born: February 16, 1988 (age 38); Seoul, South Korea
- Education: Chung-Ang University
- Occupation: Actor
- Years active: 2007–present
- Agent: Goldmedalist
- Works: Full list
- Father: Kim Chung-hoon
- Awards: Full list

Korean name
- Hangul: 김수현
- RR: Gim Suhyeon
- MR: Kim Suhyŏn
- Website: soo-hyun.com

Kim Soo-hyun (Korean: 김수현; born February 16, 1988) is a South Korean actor. He is the recipient of five Baeksang Arts Awards, two Grand Bell Awards and one Blue Dragon Film Award. Kim made his television debut in 2007 with the family sitcom Kimchi Cheese Smile following a few theatrical performances. He went on to star in television dramas Dream High (2011), Moon Embracing the Sun (2012), as well as in the top-grossing films The Thieves (2012) and Secretly, Greatly (2013).

Kim became a top hallyu star with the fantasy series My Love from the Star (2013–14), followed by the variety drama The Producers (2015). He enlisted in the mandatory military service in October 2017, and returned to acting with It's Okay to Not Be Okay (2020). Following that, he starred in One Ordinary Day (2021) and Queen of Tears (2024). He was selected as Gallup Korea's Television Actor of the Year in 2014.

== Early life and education ==
Kim was born on February 16, 1988, in Gangnam District, Seoul, South Korea. His birth father is Kim Chung-hoon who was the lead singer of the 80's band Seven Dolphins. His parents separated during his early childhood and as such considered himself an only son raised by a single mother.

Kim's mother encouraged him to take acting classes during his school years to help him overcome his shy and introverted personality. His aspirations to be an actor took off between his middle school and high school. His first major role in acting was in a stage play of Shakespeare's comedy A Midsummer Night's Dream delivering the role of Puck. His later work in theatre includes the role of Kenickie the musical Grease and titular character in the tragedy Hamlet.

By 2006, Kim completed elementary, middle and high school in Gangnam, Seoul, and debuted as a TV actor in 2007 after auditions. He enrolled at Chung-Ang University's Film and Theater Department in 2009.

== Career ==
=== 2007–2010: Career beginnings ===
Kim made his television debut with a supporting role in the 2007 family sitcom Kimchi Cheese Smile, and in 2008, landed a lead role in KBS's critically acclaimed youth drama, Jungle Fish. Based on a true story, it tackles the serious issues of school cheating, competitive academic standards, and interactive blogging in a fresh way. The drama won a number of awards, including the US Peabody Award. For the latter half of the year, Kim appeared in the food-based variety show Delicious Quiz (also known as The Taste of Life) as one of the hosts and in the short film Cherry Blossom.

In 2009, Kim acted in the short film Worst Friends by Namkoong Sun, which won the Best Film in Social Drama award at the Mise-en-scène Short Film Festival and the well-received SBS drama special Father's House where he acted alongside veteran actor Choi Min-soo. He also co-hosted Mnet's Boys & Girls Music Countdown along with Kara's Han Seung-yeon in 2009.

In January 2010, KeyEast signed an exclusive contract with Kim becoming his management company. Kim raised his profile through memorable turns as the younger version of the male lead characters in Will It Snow for Christmas? and Giant, the latter winning him the Best New Actor award at the SBS Drama Awards.

=== 2011–2013: Rising popularity and breakthrough ===
Kim became a household name in 2011 after starring in the high school musical drama Dream High. He plays a country bumpkin who turned out to be a musical genius. The drama brought in high domestic ratings and was also popular overseas, winning several international awards. As the only young actor in a cast of idols, Kim studied song and dance for three months at JYP Entertainment to pull off the required scenes in the drama. He recorded two songs for the drama's soundtrack, his solo "Dreaming" as well as the title track "Dream High" with the rest of the cast.

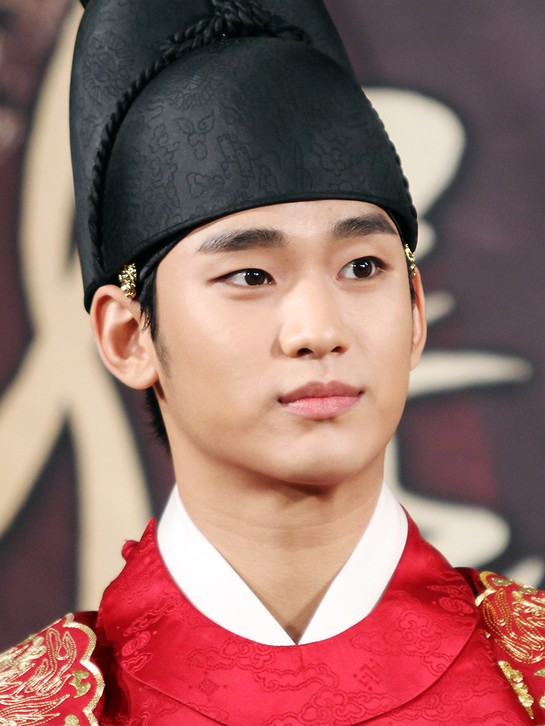
Kim as King Lee-hwon at the press conference for Moon Embracing the Sun, January 2012

Kim's popularity skyrocketed when he starred in the hit period drama Moon Embracing the Sun as the King Leehwon. The drama recorded a peak rating of 42.2 percent, thereby earning the "national drama" status and was exported to locales across Asia, making it one of the most profitable exports in the drama genre. Kim contributed his vocals to the soundtrack with the traditional ballad "Only You" and the more modern composition "Another Way".

Due to his popularity, he set a new record in product endorsements for being the face of 17 products simultaneously. He also won the Best Actor (TV) award at the 48th Baeksang Arts Awards. Beating out heavyweight veterans such as Han Suk-kyu, Shin Ha-kyun and Cha Seung-won, Kim said "I am very grateful for this moment, but I am ashamed as well. It's like getting a lot of homework. I'll keep trying to become a better actor in order to remain worthy of this award".

Kim made his big-screen debut in the star-studded heist film The Thieves, touted by the press as the Korean version of Ocean's Eleven. With over 12.9 million ticket sales, the film became the second highest-grossing movie in Korean film history.

In 2013, Kim was cast to play the role of a North Korean spy who infiltrated South Korea as a village idiot in the movie Secretly, Greatly, an adaptation of the popular webtoon series Covertness by Hun. The film broke several records and was one of the most successful box office hits of the year drawing an audience of 7 million. Kim won the Best New Actor (Film) award at the 50th Grand Bell Awards and the 50th Baeksang Arts Awards.

=== 2014–2017: International popularity ===
From 2013 to early 2014, Kim starred in SBS fantasy romance series My Love from the Star alongside Jun Ji-hyun. He also released two singles for the drama's soundtrack, titled "In Front of Your House" and "Promise". It became massively popular across Asia, especially in China; it had over 14.5 billion hits as of February 2014 on the online video platform iQIYI and also sparked trends in fashion, make-up and restaurants.

Kim experienced explosive growth in popularity throughout Asia topping various popularity polls and became one of the most in-demand endorsers with 35 product endorsements. He won the Daesang (or "Grand Prize"), the highest award for television, at the 7th Korea Drama Awards and Most Popular Actor (TV) at 50th Baeksang Arts Awards.

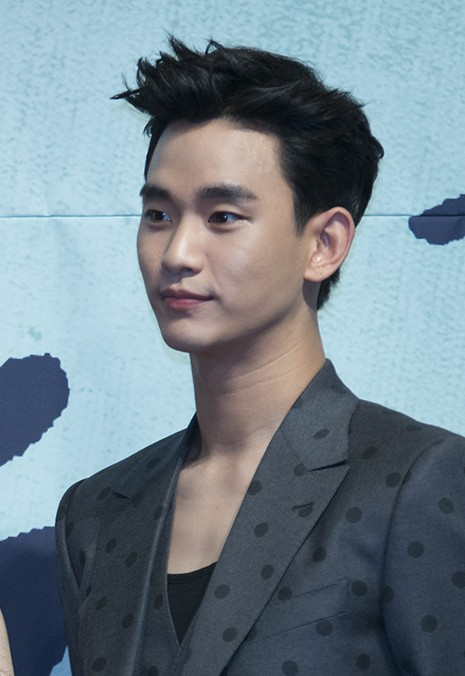
Kim at the press conference for The Producers, May 2015

In 2015, Kim starred in KBS variety drama The Producers, written by My Love From the Star writer Park Ji-eun. The drama drew solid ratings domestically, and was also sold to several countries internationally. Kim became one of South Korea's favorite leading faces on TV according to the Korea Broadcast Advertising Corporation. Kim once again won the Daesang (or "Grand Prize") at the 8th Korea Drama Awards, 4th APAN Star Awards and the 2015 KBS Drama Awards for his acting performance.

Kim's wax figure made in his image was displayed at Madame Tussauds, Hong Kong and Musée Grévin, Seoul in 2015. In the following year, he was listed under Forbes "30 Under 30 Asia list" which comprises 30 influential people under 30 years of age who have made substantial effect in their fields.

Kim then starred in the action-noir film Real, directed by his cousin Lee Sa-rang, which premiered in June 2017. The film tanked at the box office and received negative reviews from the critics for its direction, storyline, characters' information; saying that only Kim saved the movie with his acting to some extent. In contrast, the film received favourable response after its arrival in Taiwan's cinema. Expat Korean Movie Critic/Blogger Pierce Conran included Real in his list of top 15 Korean Movies of 2017 for its uniqueness and originality. In 2017, Kim took a hiatus from acting to complete his obligatory military service of 21 months.

=== 2019–present: Return to acting ===
Kim made headlines in news when he returned to his acting career through his special appearances on dramas Hotel del Luna and Crash Landing on You. In December 2019, reports surfaced that Kim would be leaving KeyEast to form a new agency with his cousin. In January 2020, Kim signed with newly formed entertainment agency Goldmedalist.

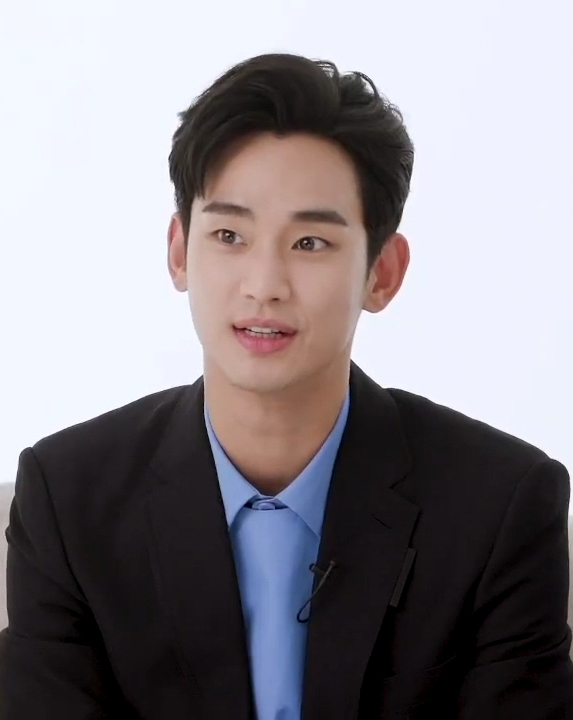
Kim in an interview for It's Okay to Not Be Okay, June 2020

In 2020, Kim took on the role of Moon Gang-tae, an orphaned psychiatric aide in the tvN broadcast romantic comedy It's Okay to Not Be Okay. The series was Kim's first small screen appearance in a lead role after a five-year gap. In comparison to his previous series, it recorded lesser TV viewership ratings. However, it was the most popular show of 2020 on Netflix in South Korea in romance genre. The New York Times named It's Okay to Not Be Okay one of "The Best International Shows of 2020", while La Tercera called it "one of the most popular Asian dramas" of 2020. S. Poorvaja of The Hindu said of Kim's acting that he brought "Gang-tae alive on screen perfectly — someone whose silent world weariness slowly but steadily progressed to sparkling eyes, smiles and enthusiasm." He won the Daesang (or "Grand Prize") at the 5th Asia Artist Awards in the television category.

In 2021, Kim starred in Coupang Play's television series One Ordinary Day, based on the British television series Criminal Justice, played the role of Kim Hyun-soo, a normal college student whose life turns upside down when he unexpectedly becomes the key suspect of the murder case. On December 21, 2021, Goldmedalist announced that it will produce and promote actor Kim Soo-hyun's digital human together with EVR Studio. That has an appearance like a real person and can use facial expressions and plans to be used in a variety of industries including entertainment, metaverse, movies, and advertising in the future.

In 2022, Studio Dragon confirmed Kim's participation in the romantic comedy series Queen of Tears written by Park Ji-eun, with whom Kim had previously collaborated on My Love from the Star and The Producers. Kim also recorded the song "Way Home" (Korean: 청혼) for the soundtrack of the series; it was the first time in 10 years since he had participated in a series' soundtrack. The series premiered on March 9, 2024, and was a success both domestically and internationally. It recorded a peak national viewership rating of 24.850% for its finale, becoming the highest-rated tvN series and remained on Netflix's Global Top 10 Non-English TV series rankings for 15 consecutive weeks from its initial release. He was nominated for Best Drama Actor for a fourth time and won Most Popular Actor for a third time at the 60th Baeksang Arts Awards. In 2024, Kim was confirmed to star as Kim Sung-joon, who goes from being an ordinary office worker to becoming the king of the global fake market in Disney+ black comedy series Knock-Off.

== Other ventures ==
=== Event appearances ===
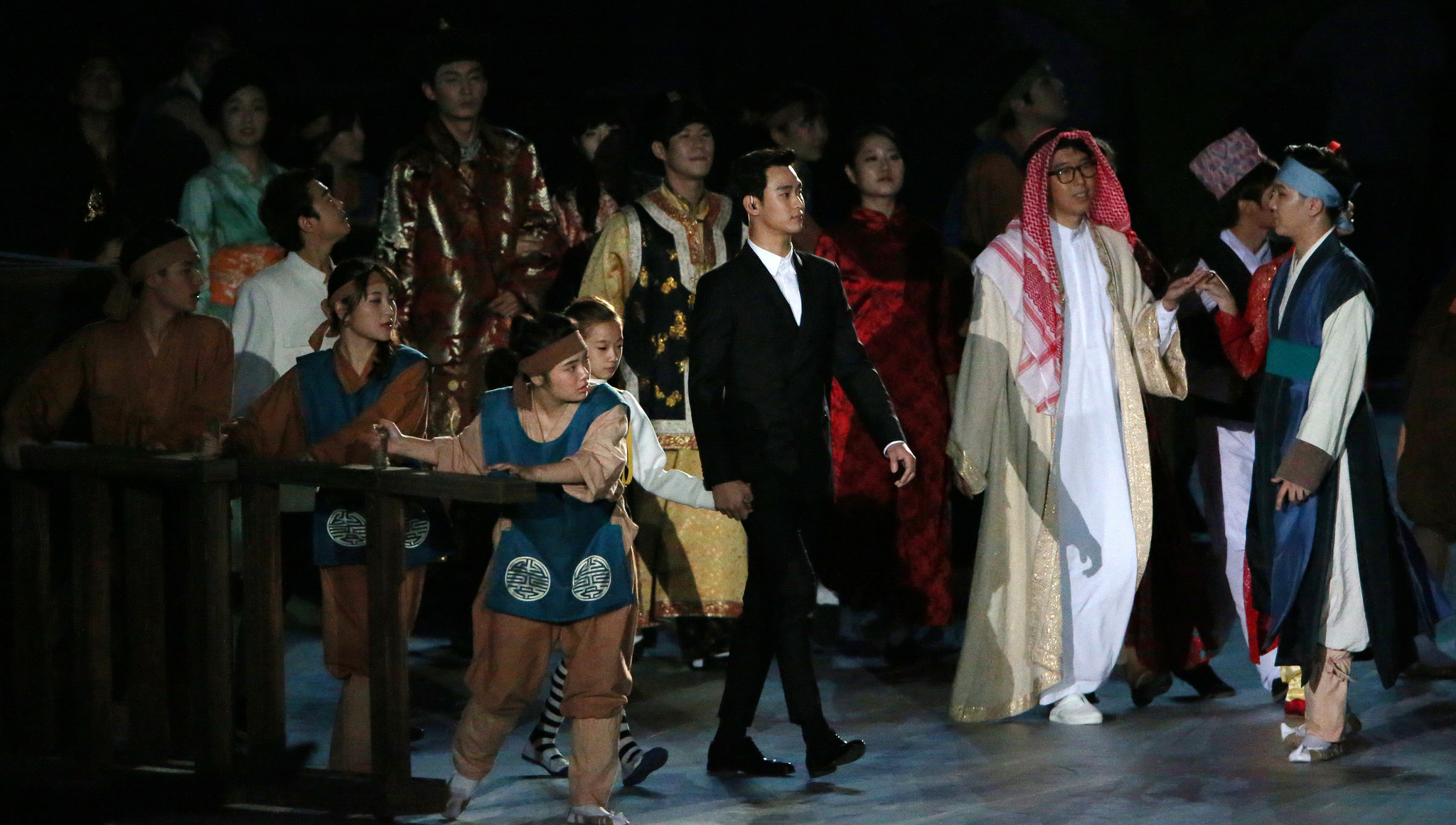
Kim at 2014 Asian Games opening ceremony

In 2014, Kim attended two international sports events. Held on August 16, 2014, Kim sang the official theme song "Light up the Future" with several artists at the opening ceremony of the 2014 Summer Youth Olympic Games held in Nanjing, China. He also participated in the opening ceremony of the 2014 Asian Games in Incheon, South Korea. Along with actor Jang Dong-gun, Korean opera singer Ahn Sook-sun and people from 45 nations, they delivered the message of "One Asia" at the second part of the highlight stage.

=== Ambassadorship ===
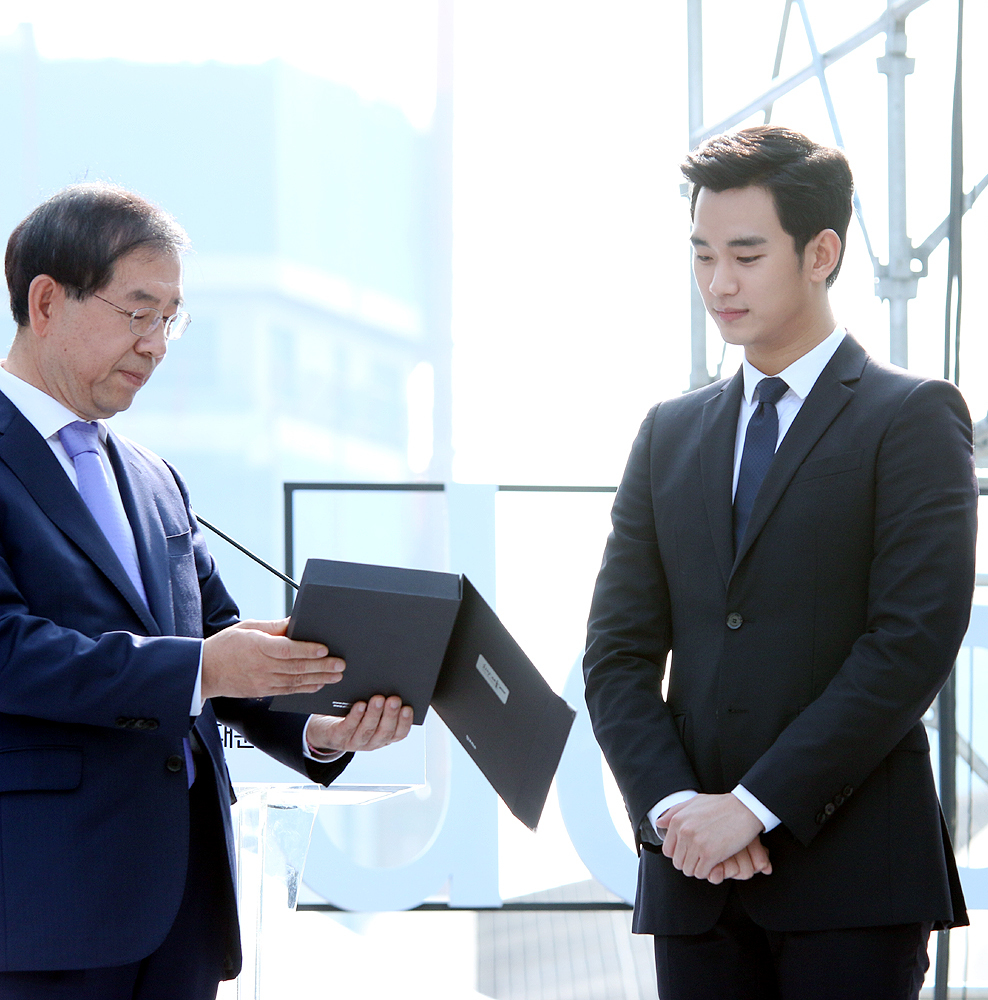
Kim at the appointment ceremony for Seoul Goodwill Ambassador

In 2011, Kim along with Bae Suzy were the ambassadors of the 16th Korea Goyang International Flower Festival. On April 18, 2012, Korea Tourism Organization appointed Kim as the honorary ambassador for Korean tourism. On December 3, 2012, Kim was appointed as the public relations ambassador for Lotte Hotel Busan. On May 20, 2014, Kim was appointed as one of the public relations ambassador for his alma mater, Chung-Ang University. On October 25, 2015, Kim was appointed as the goodwill ambassador of Seoul. For the city's promotion, he participated in various cultural events in the next two years. In 2015, Kim was the honorary ambassador for the Incheon International Airport. In 2016, Kim is the promotional ambassador for Paradise City.

=== Philanthropy ===
Since 2012, Kim and his fans have donated a total of 20 tons of rice every year to charity. In April 2014, during his tour of Asia, Kim donated about ₩200 million to the China Children & Teenager's Fund from a Gucci charity event. He also joined Yellow Ribbon Campaign, and donated ₩300 million to help the teenage victims of Sewol ferry tragedy. In January 2017, Kim along with 32 top stars of South Korea joined an online fund raising event, Give Love, to help NGOs dedicated to protecting children's rights. In February 2020, Kim delivered ₩100 million in donations to support low income families affected by COVID-19 pandemic.

=== Endorsements ===
Kim has been regarded as the "King of product endorsements" by media outlets; and has been the face of variety of products ranging from food, clothing, electronics, telecoms to automobiles and more. He started emerging as a blue chip in the advertising industry soon after he grabbed viewer's attention through his acting in Giant. But when he starred in Moon Embracing the Sun, he set the record of being the face of 17 products simultaneously overtaking figure skater Yuna Kim, who had set the record back in 2009 by amassing 15 endorsements. Kim became most in-demand advertising model after his drama My Love from the Star with appearing in more than 30 advertisements, including 10 airing in China and other Asian countries. He has also been the face of Jeju airlines and main character of a Chinese video game.

In 2014, Kim appeared in an ad alongside Gianna Jun for Chinese bottled water company Hengda bingquan. The move drew negative reactions from South Korean fans due to Hengda listing the source of its water as "Jang bai shan" (Changbai Mountain) rather than the Korean name, "Paektu Mountain". Both actors sought to revoke their ad contracts after the backlash but Kim eventually decided to continue with the ad, which disappointed many of his fans. In 2015, Kim along with Yuna Kim won grand prizes at the National Brand Awards for improving Korea's brand image.

Kim joined the Philippine retail brand Bench as a product endorser in July 2021. On September 13, 2021, Kim was selected as a global ambassador for Tommy Hilfiger. In 2022, Dunkin' Donuts named Kim as their newest product endorser. On August 17, 2023, Kim was selected as the new brand ambassador of outdoor fashion brand, Eider. In January 2025, Kim became the brand ambassador of the Italian luxury fashion brand Prada, representing the brand at the 2025 F/W Milan Fashion Week, though his relationship with the brand ended in March that year due to his dating allegations.

== Personal life ==
In March 2015, Kim was awarded for being a model taxpayer by the local tax office for paying taxes every Tax Day. In July 2015, it was revealed that Kim has a paternal half-sister named Kim Ju-na, a singer.

=== Bowling ===
A bowling enthusiast, Kim applied to become a professional bowler in October 2016. He ranked 10th out of the 114 participants on his first try-out tournament but failed to make the cut on the second, falling short of the 200 points needed to qualify with only 192.3. Kim showcased his bowling skills on his guest appearance on MBC's Infinite Challenge.

=== Military enlistment ===
Kim began his mandatory military service on October 23, 2017. He was supposed to work in public service duty instead of active duty as he previously underwent a surgery related to his heart. However, he voluntarily went for re-examinations and was eventually cleared for the combat. He entered a military camp in Paju, Gyeonggi Province, to complete his basic training.

In late November 2017, Kim's agency announced that he had completed his five weeks of basic training, placing fourth as an outstanding trainee. He was rewarded with a vacation by the division commander and received a self deployment to the First Reconnaissance Battalion to continue his duty. In February 2019, Kim received an early promotion as a Sergeant for his conduct in the military. Kim was discharged from his military service on July 1, 2019.

=== Kim Sae-ron dispute ===
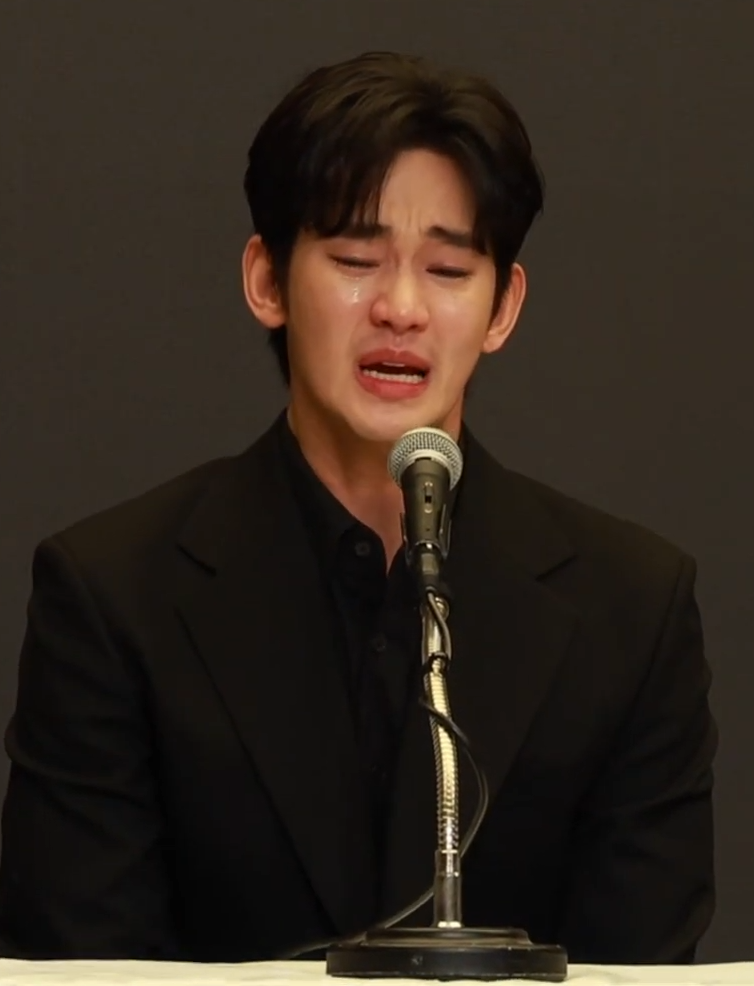
Kim at his press conference, March 2025

On March 24, 2024, Kim denied dating rumors with late actress Kim Sae-ron, after a close-up photo of them that she briefly posted and deleted on Instagram circulated online. His agency, Goldmedalist, stated that the rumors were false, explaining that the photo was taken when they were under the same management and that they were unaware of her intentions in sharing it. The agency also warned against defamatory content. The actress died by suicide on his birthday in 2025.

In March 2025, additional allegations were made against Kim, stemming from statements and photos from Kim Sae-ron's family and the far-right YouTube channel Hover Lab. The family and Hover Lab alleged that Kim had been in a six-year-long relationship with Kim Sae-ron beginning in 2015, when she was 15 and he was 27. Goldmedalist subsequently denied the allegations, announcing plans to take the "strongest possible legal action" against the claimants.

On March 13, 2025, Goldmedalist announced that they would issue their position regarding the allegations the following week. The next day, the agency released a statement confirming that the two had dated, but claimed that their relationship began in 2019, when the actress was no longer a minor. The agency also denied that they pressured Kim Sae-ron into repaying a debt pertaining to the compensation of her 2022 DUI incident, and stated that they chose not to pursue repayment after acknowledging that she would not be able to pay off the debt. They opposed the assumption that Kim's leaked letter, which he had written and sent to Kim Sae-ron when she was 17, was intimate in nature, insisting that, "the expression 'I miss you' is a casual expression that a soldier using while serving in the military would use with close acquaintances." In response, Kim Sae-ron's mother criticized the agency, saying of their initial 2024 statement, "Goldmedalist also falsely portrayed Sae-ron as a confused young woman who lied, saying they 'don't know the intention' of the photo Sae-ron uploaded."

On March 17, 2025, Kim Sae-ron's family revealed that Goldmedalist had sent her a second set of legal papers seemingly threatening her for payment of her debt and forbidding her from contacting Kim and other Goldmedalist artists. They claimed this contributed to her mental distress and ultimately her death. However, the agency rebutted by stating that the papers were meant to offer an extended payment deadline and refuted any threats regarding communication with other actors.

On March 27, 2025, Bu Ji-seok, a lawyer representing Kim Sae-ron's family, appeared in a press conference on behalf of the family and provided what he claimed to be further evidence that Kim had dated Kim Sae-ron while she was a minor. The evidence also included text messages suggesting that Kim had engaged in a sexual relationship with Kim Sae-ron.

On March 31, 2025, Kim Soo-hyun held a press conference in which he denied the allegations.

In May 2026, the Seoul Gangnam Police Station announced that it had determined evidence against Kim Soo-hyun to have been falsified using a combination of image editing and artificial intelligence, which included an AI-generated voice clone of the late actress Kim Sae-ron. The police initially announced that they were seeking an arrest warrant for Kim Se-ui of Hover Lab for fabricating and distributing the edited materials to generate attention for his YouTube channel. On May 26, 2026, the Seoul Central District Court officially granted the arrest warrant, and Kim Se-ui was detained due to concerns that he might flee or destroy evidence. Furthermore, investigative authorities booked Bu Ji-seok—the attorney representing Kim Sae-ron's family who had previously held a joint press conference with Hover Lab—as a suspected accomplice.

In June 2026, YouTuber Kim Se-ui was placed in pre-trial detention on charges related to alleged dissemination of false information and defamation in connection with claims involving actor Kim Soo-hyun. The detention occurred during ongoing investigation and trial proceedings and does not constitute a final conviction. As of 2026, no final court ruling has been issued regarding the underlying allegations, and the related claims remain legally disputed.

==== Reactions ====
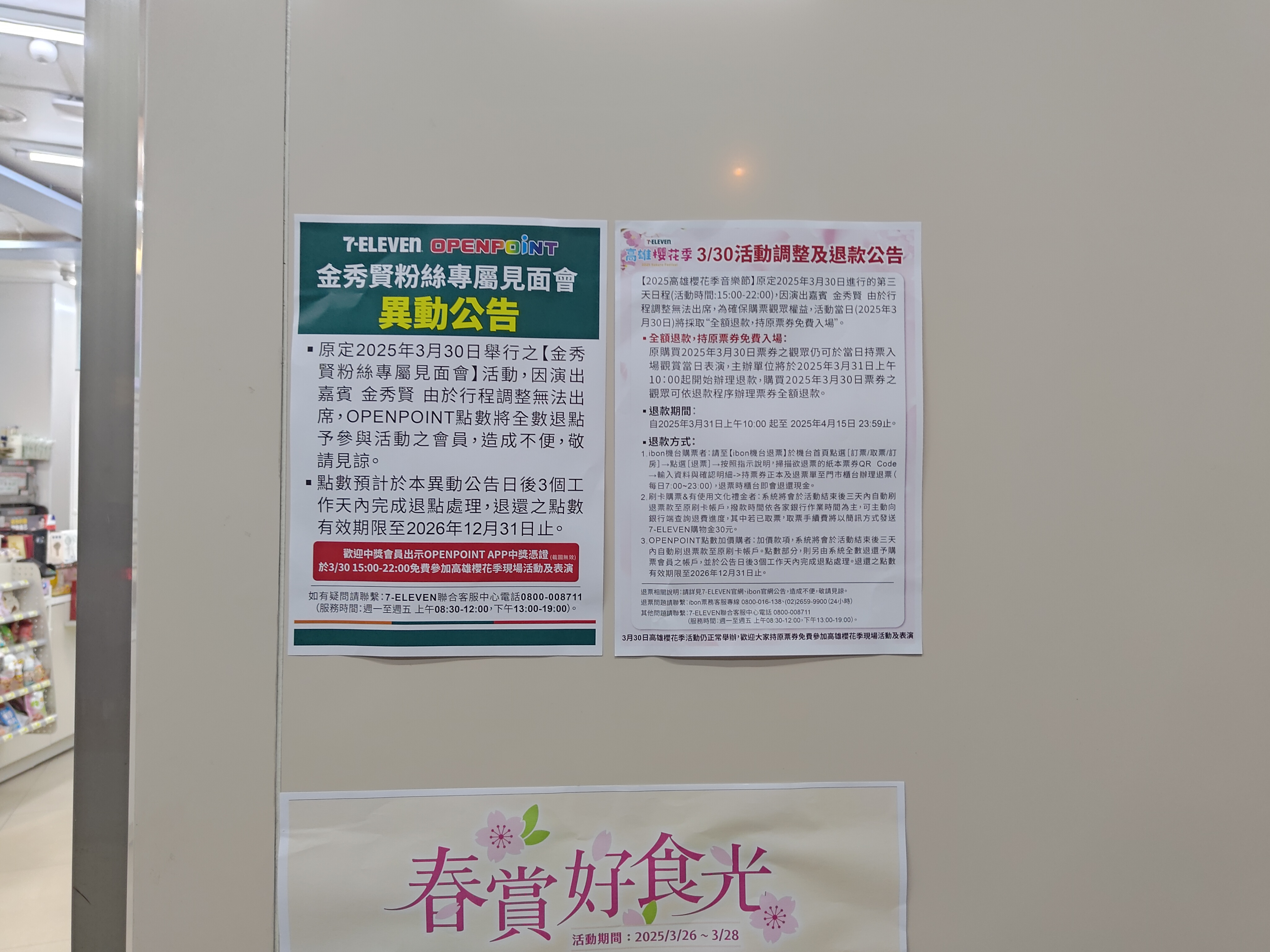
A cancellation notice of Kim's scheduled fan-meeting in Kaohsiung, March 26, 2025

Kim was met with widespread backlash in light of the allegations, with some calling for his removal from television programs, including MBC's variety program Good Day. Kim's upcoming drama Knock-Off, which was originally slated to be released through Disney+ in April 2025, had its schedule date temporarily postponed, and the filming was indefinitely suspended since April 2025. Kim's fan meeting event in Taiwan was also cancelled five days before it was originally scheduled to begin on March 30, 2025.

In response to the controversy, Kim's endorsed brands began either removing advertisements featuring the actor or terminating endorsement contracts altogether. Food company CJ Foodville, whom Kim was a longtime endorser for, announced that they ended their contract with Kim on March 14, citing the scandal. Ahn Ji-hye, CEO of cosmetics company Dinto, suspended their model-related schedules with Kim in response to the criticism surrounding the actor. In a brief statement, Italian luxury fashion brand Prada announced that they had mutually decided to end their collaboration with Kim.

On April 24, 2025, Cuckoo Electronics filed a request for the temporary seizure of approximately ₩100 million (equivalent to ₩117.23 million or US$87,468.18 in 2025) of Kim's personal assets. The 52nd Civil Court of the Seoul Eastern District Court approved the request on May 20. On May 8, 2025, Classys filed a request for temporary seizure of real estate against Kim, and the Seoul Eastern District Court approved the request on May 20, seizing Kim's apartment at Galleria Foret worth approximately 3 billion won. On June 18, 2025, four lawsuits against Kim from advertisers were confirmed, demanding a total of 7.3 billion won in compensation. On August 19, 2025, it was reported that six companies that previously collaborated with Kim on advertising (including Classys, Cuckoo Holdings Group, Cuckoo Electronics, Cuckoo Homesys, FromBIO, and Trendmaker) jointly filed a lawsuit against Kim and his agency Goldmedalist, demanding approximately 10 billion won in damages for violating the "image maintenance clause".

== Filmography ==
Selected filmography

- Dream High (2011)
- Moon Embracing the Sun (2012)
- The Thieves (2012)
- Secretly, Greatly (2013)
- My Love from the Star (2013–2014)
- The Producers (2015)
- It's Okay to Not Be Okay (2020)
- One Ordinary Day (2021)
- Queen of Tears (2024)

== Discography ==
List of singles, with selected chart positions, showing year released and album name
| Title | Year | Peak chart positions | | Sales | Album |
| Title | Year | KOR | KOR Hot | Sales | Album |
As lead artist
| "Another Way: Secret Version" (또 다른 길) | 2012 | 119 | 38 | —N/a | Non-album single |
Soundtrack appearances
| "Dream High" (with Taecyeon, Wooyoung, Suzy & Joo) | 2011 | 41 | — | —N/a | Dream High OST |
| "Dreaming" | 2011 | 4 | — | KOR: 1,243,464 (Note: Sales figure for "Dreaming" as of December 2011) | Dream High OST |
| "The One and Only You" (그대 한 사람) | 2012 | 2 | 2 | KOR: 1,619,612 (Note: Sales figure for "The One and Only You" as of December 2012) | Moon Embracing the Sun OST |
| "If I" (너의 집 앞; lit. 'In Front of Your House') | 2014 | 4 | 4 | KOR: 379,336 (Note: Sales figure for "If I" and "Promise" as of March 2014) | My Love from the Star OST |
| "Promise" (약속) | 2014 | 16 | 13 | KOR: 125,051 | Non-album single (Note: Although "Promise" was part of My Love from the Star's soundtrack, it was not the part of series' soundtrack album.) |
| "Way Home" (청혼) | 2024 | 73 | — | —N/a | Queen of Tears OST |
"—" denotes releases that did not chart or were not released in that region.

Commercial and promotional singles
| Title | Year | Note |
|---|---|---|
| "Crazy4s" | 2011 | Commercial song recorded for his Spris spring advertisement along with Hahm Eun-jung. |
| "Marine Boy" | 2012 | Commercial and promotional song by Samsung to support swimmer Park Tae-hwan for 2012 Summer Olympics. |
| "Winter Wonderland" | 2012 | Commercial song recorded for his Tous les Jours winter advertisement. |
| "Hey Jude" | 2022 | Commercial song recorded for The Sharp apartment advertisement. |
