= Secretly, Greatly =

2013 South Korean action comedy film

- Theatrical release poster
- Hangul: 은밀하게 위대하게
- Hanja: 隱密하게 偉大하게
- RR: Eunmilhage widaehage
- MR: Ŭnmirhage widaehage
- Directed by: Jang Cheol-soo
- Written by: Yun Hong-gi; Kim Bang-hyeon
- Based on: Covertness by Hun
- Produced by: Kim Yeong-min
- Starring: Kim Soo-hyun; Park Ki-woong; Lee Hyun-woo
- Cinematography: Choe Sang-ho
- Edited by: Kim Sun-min
- Music by: Jang Young-gyu; Dalpalan
- Distributed by: Showbox/Mediaplex
- Release date: 5 June 2013
- Running time: 123 minutes
- Country: South Korea
- Language: Korean
- Box office: US$42.6 million

Secretly, Greatly (Korean: 은밀하게 위대하게; RR: Eunmilhage widaehage) is a 2013 South Korean action comedy-drama film starring Kim Soo-hyun, Park Ki-woong, and Lee Hyun-woo, who play North Korean spies who infiltrate South Korea as a village idiot, a rock musician, and a high school student, respectively. They assimilate to small-town life while awaiting their orders, until one day, due to a sudden power shift in the North, their mission turns out to be an order to commit suicide.

The film is based on the 2010 spy webtoon series Covertness by Hun. Upon its release on 5 June 2013, the film broke several box office records in South Korea: the highest single-day opening for a domestic film, most tickets sold in one day for a domestic film, the biggest opening weekend, the highest-grossing webtoon-based film, and the fastest movie to reach the million, two million, three million, and four million marks in audience number. Movie pundits attribute its success to a large teen audience turnout.

== Synopsis ==
A group of spies called the 5446 Corps were trained by North Korean elite special forces since their youth, ostensibly towards the lofty goal of unifying Korea. They are ambitiously dispatched to South Korea, where each assumes a disguise. The story protagonists are three men who masquerade as a village idiot, an aspiring rock musician, and a high school student. As time passes without further orders from the North, the three spies gradually get used to life as ordinary members of a small neighborhood until one day, their mundane lives are turned upside down when a "secret and great" mission is suddenly assigned to them. Due to the events of the 2002 Second Battle of Yeonpyeong, South Korea demands the names, location, and rank of 30 North Korean spies active in the South, promising financial aid to the North on the condition that Pyongyang turns in their spies. To prevent the 5446 Corps from falling into enemy hands, the North Korean government orders them to take their own lives. Meanwhile, their North Korean army instructor, Kim Tae-won, crosses the border to eliminate those who refuse to obey.

== Cast ==
=== Principal ===
- Kim Soo-hyun – Lieutenant Won Ryu-hwan / Bang Dong-gu

North Korean top agent who beat out 20,000 other competitors and has an uncanny ability to read people; disguised as a village idiot.

- Park Ki-woong – Rhee Hae-rang / Kim Min-su

Son of the high-ranking North Korean official Rhee Moo-Hyuk, he is almost as skilled as Ryu-hwan; disguised as an aspiring rock musician.

- Lee Hyun-woo – Rhee Hae-jin

The youngest secret agent in North Korean history; disguised as a high school student.

=== Supporting ===
- Son Hyun-joo – Colonel Kim Tae-won, 5446 Corps training chief
- Park Hye-sook – Jeon Soon-im, "Market granny"
- Kim Sung-kyun – Seo Soo-hyuk, NIS team leader
- Go Chang-seok – 2nd Lieutenant Seo Sang-gu / Professor Seo Young-guk
- Jang Gwang – Go Hwi-sun, "Old man Go"
- Shin Jung-geun – Mr. Park, the barber
- Hong Kyung-in – Jo Doo-seok, Soon-im's son
- Lee Chae-young – Heo Jeom-ran, nicknamed "Ran"
- Park Eun-bin – Yoon Yoo-ran
- Choi Woo-shik – Yoon Yoo-joo, Yoo-ran's younger brother
- Joo Hyun – Rhee Moo-hyuk, 5446 Corps founder and Hae-rang's father
- Goo Seung-hyun – Hwang Chi-woong
- Jo Yong-jin – Hwang Se-woong, Chi-woong's younger brother
- Lee Yeon-kyung – Chi-woong and Se-woong's mother
- Kim Young-jin – Kim Hee-kwan, former MPAF head
- Uhm Tae-goo – Hwang Jae-oh
- Moon Won-joo – Choi Wan-woo
- Kim Beop-rae – NIS director
- Lee Min – department head
- Yoon Won-seok – Deong-chi
- Park Jeong-gi – strike force team leader
- Lee Jae-woo – North Korea military officer
- Go In-beom – Choi Jin-tak, NIS chief
- Lee Bo-hyeon – NIS agent
- Yook Se-jin – NIS agent
- Kang Eun-tak – NIS agent
- Park Jang-shik – NIS agent
- Won Hyeon-jun – NIS agent
- Heo Seok – NIS agent
- Son Jun-young – young Ryu-hwan
- Hong Tae-ui – young Hae-rang
- Sung Yu-bin – young Hae-jin
- Kim Do-gyun – audition judge

== Reception ==
With 498,282 tickets sold on the day of its release, Secretly, Greatly recorded the highest single-day opening to date (by a domestic film) in South Korea, surpassing the record previously held by The Host, which opened with about 450,000 tickets sold in 2006. Within 36 hours after its release, the film drew 1,011,025 viewers, becoming the fastest movie to reach the million mark in audience number in the nation. For its second day (which coincided with Korea's Memorial Day holiday), it recorded the largest admission total for a single day (by a domestic film), with 919,035 viewers. 72 hours after its release, the number of tickets sold for Secretly, Greatly crossed the two million mark, the fastest film to ever do so. On its fifth day, total ticket sales broke the three million mark, as the fastest record of all time. The film recorded the biggest opening weekend, with a total of 3,491,294 viewers, beating Transformers: Dark of the Moon, which opened with 3,356,316 viewers in 2011. It also became the highest-grossing webtoon-based movie in the nation, surpassing the 2010 film Moss, which sold 3,408,144 tickets. On its eighth day, Secretly, Greatly became the fastest movie to reach the four million mark in audience number, tied with The Host, Transformers: Dark of the Moon, The Thieves, and Iron Man 3. By the twelfth day, it drew five million viewers. In 19 days, it became the fourth highest-grossing film of 2013 in the nation, behind Miracle in Cell No. 7 (12.32 million), Iron Man 3 (8.99 million), and The Berlin File (7.16 million), garnering over 6.96 million in audience numbers.

== International release ==
The film was released in multiple territories across Asia and North America.

In North America, it was the centerpiece presentation of the 12th New York Asian Film Festival, held on 11 July 2013. It subsequently opened in New York City and Los Angeles, before screening in 10–15 US other cities. The 17th Fantasia International Film Festival in Montreal, Canada, showed the film in mid-July, and Secretly, Greatly was officially released in the rest of the country later that month.

In Asia, the film was first screened in Singapore and Taiwan in July, before rolling out in Japan, Indonesia, Hong Kong, China, and Thailand. The film was also shown at the 17th Puchon International Fantastic Film Festival and won the NH Nonghyup Citizen's Choice Award.

== Awards and nominations ==
Year	Award	Category	Recipient	Result	Ref.
2013	7th Mnet 20's Choice Awards	20s Movie Star – Male	Kim Soo-hyun	Nominated	
2013	17th Puchon International Fantastic Film Festival	Men's Fantasia Award	Kim Soo-hyun	Won	
2013	17th Puchon International Fantastic Film Festival	NH Nonghyup Citizen's Choice Award	Secretly, Greatly	Won	
2013	50th Grand Bell Awards	Best New Actor	Kim Soo-hyun	Won	
2013	22nd Buil Film Awards	Best Supporting Actress	Park Hye-sook	Nominated	
2013	22nd Buil Film Awards	Best New Actor	Lee Hyun-woo	Nominated	
2013	34th Blue Dragon Film Awards	Best New Actor	Lee Hyun-woo	Nominated	
2013	33rd Korean Association of Film Critics Awards	Best New Actor	Kim Soo-hyun	Nominated	
2014	50th Baeksang Arts Awards	Best New Actor (Film)	Kim Soo-hyun	Won	
2014	50th Baeksang Arts Awards	Most Popular Actor (Film)	Kim Soo-hyun	Won	
2014	16th Seoul International Youth Film Festival	Best Young Actor	Lee Hyun-woo	Nominated	
