= Another Way: Secret Version =

"Another Way"

Single by Kim Soo-hyun
- Released: March 14, 2012
- Recorded: 2012
- Genre: Pop, K-pop
- Length: 15:04
- Label: 음제협

Kim Soo-hyun singles chronology
"The One and Only You" (2012)	"Another Way" (2012)	"Marine Boy" (2012)

"Another Way" (also known as Another Way: Secret Version) is a single released by South Korean actor Kim Soo-hyun. It was released on March 14, 2012.

== Information ==
The single was the first independent single of Kim Soo-hyun which was released a day after releasing his OST "One and Only You" from his hit drama The Moon that Embraces the Sun. The album contains four different version of the title track, "Another Way".

== Track listing ==
No.	Title	Length
1.	"Another Way"	4:50
2.	"Another Way (Piano Version)"	2:42
3.	"Another Way (Instrumental)"	4:50
4.	"Another Way (Piano Version) (Instrumental)"	2:42
Total length:		15:04

== Chart performance ==
Chart (2012)	Peak position
Gaon Chart Gaon Weekly Singles Chart	119
Billboard Korea K-Pop Hot 100	38

== Release history ==
Region	Date	Format
Worldwide	March 14, 2012	Digital download
