= Worst Friends (2009 film) =

- Still from the short film Worst Friends
- Hangul: 최악의 친구들
- RR: Choeagui chingudeul
- MR: Ch'oeagŭi ch'in'gudŭl
- Directed by: Namkoong Sun
- Written by: Namkoong Sun
- Produced by: Kim Bora
- Starring: Kim Soo-hyun; Bae Hye-mi; Jung So-min
- Cinematography: Jung Jaekeun
- Edited by: Namkoong Sun; Um Yoonzoo
- Music by: Kim Saebom; Kim Yeonhwa; Han Jeongwon
- Release date: 2009
- Running time: 38 minutes
- Country: South Korea
- Language: Korean

Worst Friends (Korean: 최악의 친구들; RR: Choeagui chingudeul) is a 2009 South Korean short film starring Kim Soo-hyun. Its directorial intention is a retrospective of losing a friend in delirious Seoul. Directed and written by Namkoong Sun, it was made at the Korea National University of Arts' Department of Film Graduation Workshop.

== Plot ==
Jun-ki (Kim Soo-hyun), a boy with shaggy hair that covers his face, returns to Korea from an unsuccessful American educational trip. When the 19 year old In-sun hears that her first ever intimate experience partner is coming back, she is thrilled.

== Cast ==
- Kim Soo-hyun as Jun-ki
- Bae Hye-mi as In-sun
- Kim Eun-mi as No-vak
- Jung So-min as Mang
- Choi Jeong-nam as Jun-ki's Mother
- Go Chan-bin as Hyun-jin
- Kim Seong-woo as Older Hyun-jin

== Accolades ==
=== Awards ===
Year	Festival	Category	Recipient	Result	Ref.
2009	Mise-en-scène Short Film Festival	Best Film in A City of Sadness	Worst Friends	Won	

=== Screenings ===
Year	Festival	Ref.
2009	Mise-en-scène Short Film Festival, Seoul	
2009	Indieforum (Independent Film & Video Makers Forum), Seoul	
2009	Jeongdongjin Independent Film & Video Festival, Korea	
2009	Great Short Film Festival, Seoul	
2011	Mise-en-scène Short Film Festival, Seoul	
2012	Short Shorts Film Festival, Tokyo	
