= Queen of Tears =

2024 South Korean television series

- Promotional poster
- Hangul: 눈물의 여왕
- Hanja: 눈물의 女王
- RR: Nunmurui yeowang
- MR: Nunmurŭi yŏwang
- Genre: Romantic comedy
- Developed by: CJ ENM
- Written by: Park Ji-eun
- Directed by: Jang Young-woo; Kim Hee-won
- Starring: Kim Soo-hyun; Kim Ji-won; Park Sung-hoon; Kwak Dong-yeon; Lee Joo-bin
- Music by: Nam Hye-seung
- Opening theme: "In a Beautiful Way" (Opening Title ver.) by Kim Kyung-hee
- Country of origin: South Korea
- Original language: Korean
- No. of episodes: 16 + 2 special

Production
- Executive producers: Lee Hye-young (CP); Park Joo-yeon; Kang Hee-wook
- Producers: Kim Je-hyun; Yoo Sang-won; Jang Jin-wook; Jang Young-woo; Kim Tae-hun; Heo Do-yun; Jo Su-yeong
- Production locations: South Korea; Germany
- Cinematography: Kang Yoon-soon; Wang Ho-sang; Park Se-hee; Kim Ji-hoon
- Editor: Yoo Hyun-hye
- Running time: 80~90 minutes
- Production companies: Studio Dragon; Culture Depot; Showrunners
- Budget: ₩56 billion

Original release
- Network: tvN
- Release: March 9 – April 28, 2024

Queen of Tears (Korean: 눈물의 여왕) is a 2024 South Korean romantic comedy television series written by Park Ji-eun, co-directed by Jang Young-woo and Kim Hee-won, and starring Kim Soo-hyun, Kim Ji-won, Park Sung-hoon, Kwak Dong-yeon, and Lee Joo-bin. The series explores the nuances of a married couple going through a difficult time together. It aired on tvN from March 9, to April 28, 2024, every Saturday and Sunday at 21:20 (KST). It is also available for streaming on TVING in South Korea, and on Netflix in selected regions.

According to Nielsen Korea, the series recorded a nationwide TV rating of 24.850% for its final episode and became the highest-rated tvN series, surpassing Crash Landing on You. In Netflix's biannual Engagement Report released in September 2024, Queen of Tears was the most-watched Korean television series of all time on Netflix, with 682.6 million hours viewed in total. Queen of Tears became the first Korean television series to win at both the Asian Academy Creative Awards and Asian Television Awards in the same year, receiving the Best Direction at the former and the Best Scriptwriting at the latter. The series also won the Best Drama award at the Korea Drama Awards and the Seoul International Drama Awards.

== Plot ==
The story revolves around Hong Hae-in – a third-generation chaebol heiress of the Queens Group – and Baek Hyun-woo, the son of farmers from Yongdu-ri. With the couple on the verge of divorce after three years of marriage, Hae-in was diagnosed with brain cancer one day, forcing them to confront their deep-seated issues and regain love towards each other. When Hae-in's health condition deteriorates, Hyun-woo is forced to confront his own selfishness and the mistakes he has made. Yoon Eun-sung, Hae-in's childhood friend who harbors a long-held love for her, comes to offer his support and care to Hae-in. As Hae-in fights her illness, the couple is forced to confront their past mistakes and understand their personality differences.

== Cast and characters ==
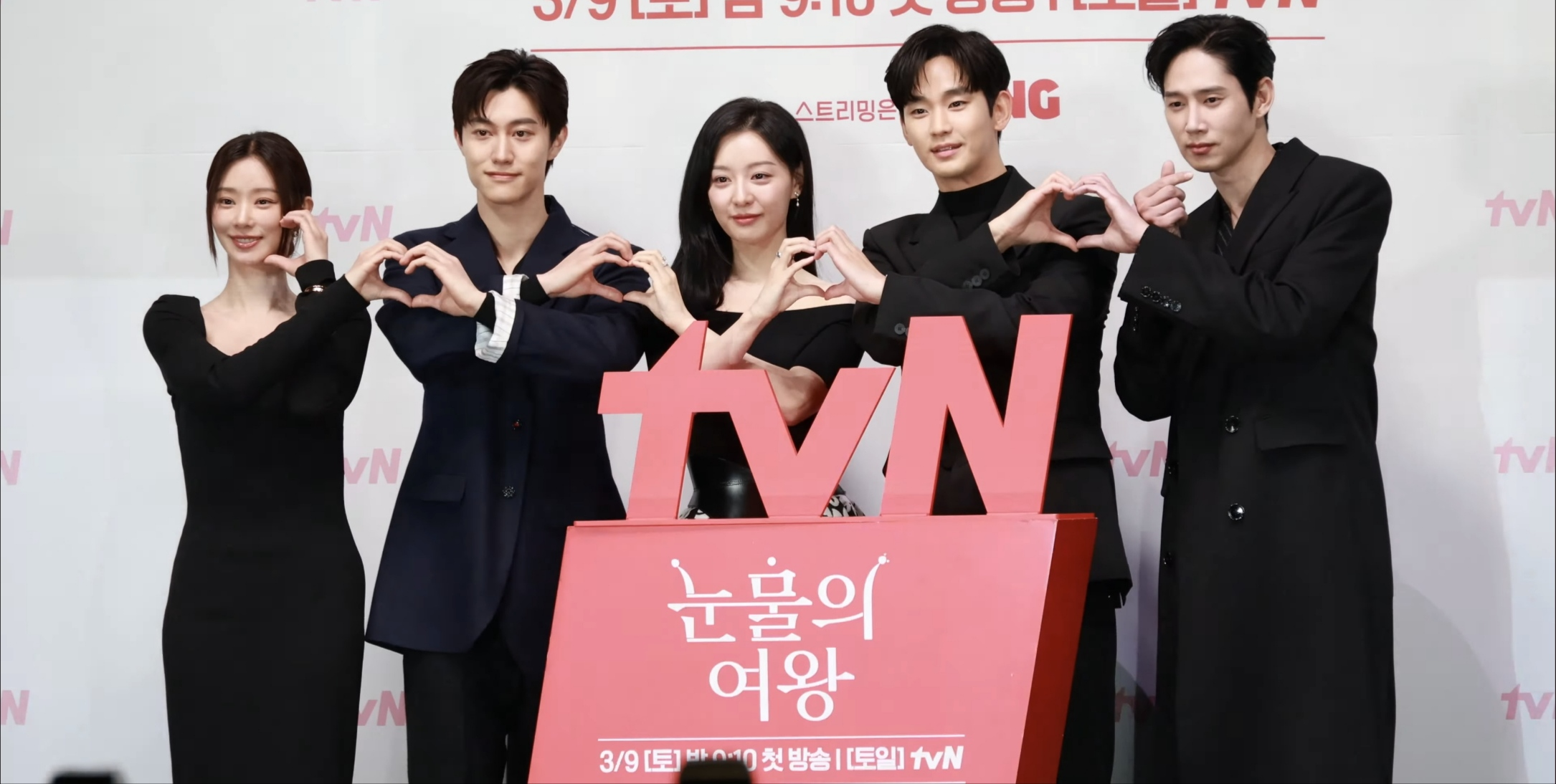
Queen of Tears' main cast at the press conference on March 7, 2024.

=== Main ===
- Kim Soo-hyun as Baek Hyun-woo
  - Moon Seong-hyun as teen Baek Hyun-woo
  - Choi Yi-an as child Baek Hyun-woo

Hae-in's husband and the legal director of Queens Group. Born in the rural area of Yongdu-ri, he is a lawyer who graduated from Seoul National University.

- Kim Ji-won as Hong Hae-in
  - Hwang Ji-ah as teen Hong Hae-in
  - Min Seo-hyung as child Hong Hae-in

Hyun-woo's wife and the CEO of Queens Department Store. She is a third-generation chaebol heiress and granddaughter of the Queens family.

- Park Sung-hoon as Yoon Eun-sung / David Yoon
  - Lee Joo-won as child Yoon Eun-sung

Hae-in's university acquaintance. He is a former Wall Street analyst and M&A expert who returns to South Korea as a famous investor.

- Kwak Dong-yeon as Hong Soo-cheol
  - Kim Joon-eui as child Hong Soo-cheol

Hae-in's younger brother and the CEO of Queens Mart.

- Lee Joo-bin as Cheon Da-hye
  - Choi Na-rin as child Cheon Da-hye

Soo-cheol's wife.

=== Supporting ===
==== Hae-in's family ====
- Kim Kap-soo as Hong Man-dae

Hae-in's grandfather and the chairman of Queens Group.

- Lee Mi-sook as Moh Seul-hee

Man-dae's live-in girlfriend.

- Jung Jin-young as Hong Beom-jun

Hae-in's father and the vice-chairman of Queens Group.

- Na Young-hee as Kim Seon-hwa

Hae-in's mother.

- Kim Jung-nan as Hong Beom-ja

Hae-in's aunt.

- Goo Shi-woo as Hong Geon-u

Soo-cheol and Da-hye's son.

- Park Yoon-hee as Hong Beom-seok

Hae-in's uncle and the former CEO of Queens Distribution.

- Ko Dong-ha as Hong Su-wan

Hae-in's late elder brother.

==== Hyun-woo's family ====
- Jeon Bae-soo as Baek Du-gwan

Hyun-woo's father and the head of Yongdu-ri.

- Hwang Young-hee as Jeon Bong-ae

Hyun-woo's mother.

- Kim Do-hyun as Baek Hyun-tae

Hyun-woo's elder brother who runs a boxing gym.

- Jang Yoon-ju as Baek Mi-seon

Hyun-woo's elder sister who runs a beauty salon.

- Kim Dong-ha as Baek Ho-yeol

Hyun-tae's son.

==== Yongdu-ri ====
- Kim Young-min as Yong-song

A selfless person similar to Oh Eun-young.

- Park Jung-pyo as Chun-sik

Kang-mi's husband and Du-gwan's right-hand man.

- Shim Woo-sung as Park Seok-hoon

President of Yongdu-ri Youth Association and Du-gwan's rival.

- Park Sung-yeon as Kang-mi

Chun-sik's wife and a regular customer at Mi-seon's beauty salon.

- Lee Soo-ji as Bang-sil

Hyun-woo's childhood friend from church and a regular customer at Mi-seon's beauty salon.

- Lee Ji-hye as Hyun-jung

A regular customer at Mi-seon's beauty salon.

- Kim Do-jin as a boxing student

==== Others ====
- Kim Joo-ryoung as Grace Ko / Ko Jeong-ja

A private secretary who is in charge of the Queens family's affairs.

- Yoon Bo-mi as Na Chae-yeon

Hae-in's secretary.

- Moon Tae-yu as Kim Yang-ki

A respected divorce lawyer. He is Hyun-woo's university friend and reliable supporter.

- Jeong Ji-hwan as Kim Min-gyu

Hyun-woo's secretary.

=== Extended ===
- Seo Sang-won as Park Jin-guk

Hae-in's doctor.

- Shim Hye-rim as Kim Min-ji

An employee at the Queens Department Store's cosmetics section.

- Kwak Jin-seok as Pyeon Seong-uk

CEO of a real estate agency.

=== Special appearances ===
- Oh Jung-se as Lee Min-woo

Hyun-woo's psychiatrist.

- Lee Hang-na as a prisoner
- Im Chul-soo as a private investigator
- Ko Kyu-pil as a private investigator
- Heo Tae-hee
- Seo Ye-hwa as Kim Ye-na

CEO of Royal Department Store.

- Sebastian Roché as Liam Braun

A German doctor.

- Dieter Hallervorden as a Sanssouci Park guard
- Song Joong-ki as Vincenzo Cassano
- Kim Shin-rok as Hyeon-suk

Hyun-tae's wife.

- Hong Jin-kyung as private investigator Hong

Owner of Hong Gil-dong Detective Agency.

- Jo Se-ho as private investigator Hong's right-hand man
- Nam Chang-hee as private investigator Hong's left-hand man

== Production ==
=== Development ===
Screenwriter Park Ji-eun started preparing her new project entitled Queen of Tears about two years after finishing Crash Landing on You (2019–2020), which starred Hyun Bin and Son Ye-jin. Lee Eung-bok, who has directed hit dramas like Guardian: The Lonely and Great God (2016–2017), Descendants of the Sun (2016), Mr. Sunshine (2018), and Sweet Home (2020–present), was reportedly in talks to join the team at that time.

Studio Dragon confirmed that the production of Queen of Tears would start in the first half of 2023, and the series was expected to be released in the second half of 2023. It is co-directed by Jang Young-woo, who worked on Crash Landing on You (2019–2020) and Bulgasal: Immortal Souls (2021–2022), and Kim Hee-won, who worked on Vincenzo (2021) and Little Women (2022). Aside from Studio Dragon, the series is also co-produced by Culture Depot and Showrunners.

The first script reading was conducted on March 30, 2023, near Sangam-dong, Mapo District, Seoul.

Initially estimated at over ₩40 billion, the total budget of the series was ₩56 billion, costing ₩3.5 billion per episode.

=== Casting ===
In April 2022, Park Ji-eun proposed the female lead role in her new project to Lee Ji-eun, but the offer was declined. Kim Soo-hyun received a proposal for the male lead role the next day.

The appearances of Kim Soo-hyun and Kim Ji-won were officially confirmed in December 2022. This is the third collaboration between Park and Kim Soo-hyun, after My Love from the Star (2013–2014) and The Producers (2015).

Park Sung-hoon, Kwak Dong-yeon, and Lee Joo-bin were cast in February and April 2023, respectively.

=== Filming ===
Principal photography took place between April and December 2023, across various cities in South Korea and Germany.

== Original soundtrack ==
The soundtrack of the series, led by music director Nam Hye-seung and featuring artists BSS, 10cm, Heize, Crush, Hong Isaac, Kim Na-young, Paul Kim, Choi Yu-ree, So Su-bin, and Dori, was revealed on March 6, 2024. Zerobaseone's Kim Tae-rae also participated in the soundtrack, while the series' lead actor, Kim Soo-hyun, lent his voice for the first time in 10 years.

=== Album ===
Queen of Tears (Original Television Soundtrack) Special

Soundtrack album by Various artists
- Released: April 30, 2024
- Length: 121:21
- Language: Korean
- Labels: Sori Narly; Studio Dragon

Singles from Queen of Tears
- 1. "The Reasons of My Smiles" Released: March 9, 2024; 2. "Tell Me It's Not a Dream" Released: March 16, 2024; 3. "Hold Me Back" Released: March 17, 2024; 4. "Love You With All My Heart" Released: March 24, 2024; 5. "Fallin'" Released: March 30, 2024; 6. "Can't Get Over You" Released: April 6, 2024; 7. "From Bottom of My Heart" Released: April 7, 2024; 8. "Last Chance" Released: April 13, 2024; 9. "Promise" Released: April 14, 2024; 10. "Heart Flutter" Released: April 21, 2024; 11. "More Than Enough" Released: April 27, 2024; 12. "Way Home" Released: April 29, 2024

Queen of Tears' soundtrack album was released on April 30, 2024; it contains all of the singles and background tracks from the series.

==== Tracklist ====
CD 1
No.	Title	Lyrics	Music	Artist	Length
1.	"In a Beautiful Way" (Opening Title ver.)	Nam Hye-seung; Kim Kyung-hee	Nam Hye-seung; Kim Kyung-hee	Kim Kyung-hee	0:56
2.	"The Reasons of My Smiles" (자꾸만 웃게 돼)	Nam Hye-seung; Kim Kyung-hee	Nam Hye-seung; Kim Kyung-hee	BSS	3:33
3.	"Tell Me It's Not a Dream" (고장난걸까)	Nam Hye-seung; Kim Kyung-hee	Nam Hye-seung; Kim Kyung-hee	10cm	3:55
4.	"Hold Me Back" (멈춰줘)	Nam Hye-seung; Park Jin-ho	Nam Hye-seung; Park Jin-ho	Heize	3:52
5.	"Love You With All My Heart" (미안해 미워해 사랑해)	Nam Hye-seung; Kim Kyung-hee	Nam Hye-seung; Kim Kyung-hee	Crush	4:04
6.	"Fallin'"	Nam Hye-seung; Park Jin-ho	Nam Hye-seung; Park Jin-ho	Hong Isaac	4:16
7.	"Can't Get Over You" (좋아해요)	Nam Hye-seung; Park Jin-ho	Nam Hye-seung; Park Jin-ho	Paul Kim	4:05
8.	"From Bottom of My Heart" (일기)	Nam Hye-seung; Kim Kyung-hee	Nam Hye-seung; Kim Kyung-hee	Kim Na-young	3:58
9.	"Last Chance"	Nam Hye-seung; Park Jin-ho	Nam Hye-seung; Park Jin-ho	So Soo-bin	4:08
10.	"Promise"	Nam Hye-seung; Park Jin-ho	Nam Hye-seung; Park Jin-ho	Choi Yu-ree	3:56
11.	"Heart Flutter" (떨림)	Nam Hye-seung; Park Jin-ho	Nam Hye-seung; Park Jin-ho	Dori	3:40
12.	"More Than Enough" (더 바랄게 없죠)	Nam Hye-seung; Park Jin-ho	Nam Hye-seung; Park Jin-ho	Kim Tae-rae (Zerobaseone)	4:13
13.	"Way Home" (청혼)	Nam Hye-seung; Kim Kyung-hee	Nam Hye-seung; Kim Kyung-hee	Kim Soo-hyun	3:39
14.	"In a Beautiful Way" (Full ver.)	Nam Hye-seung; Kim Kyung-hee	Nam Hye-seung; Kim Kyung-hee	Kim Kyung-hee	3:17
Total length:					51:32

CD 2
No.	Title	Music	Length
1.	"Timing Game" (눈치게임)	Nam Hye-seung; Park Sang-hee	1:34
2.	"Love, Love, Love"	Nam Hye-seung; Cheon Jung-hoon	1:24
3.	"It Is What It Is" (인생은 그런것)	Nam Hye-seung; Cho Mi-ra	1:04
4.	"Reconciliation" (화해)	Lee So-young	2:22
5.	"If I Really Love You" (진짜 사랑한다면)	Nam Hye-seung; Park Sang-hee	1:46
6.	"Looking for HaeIn" (해인을 찾아서)	Nam Hye-seung; Park Sang-hee	1:18
7.	"Hated You Back Then" (그땐 널 미워했어)	Kim Yong-eun; Jeong Su-wan	2:44
8.	"Indelible Love" (사랑은 숨길 수 없는 것)	Nam Hye-seung; Go Eun-jeong	1:58
9.	"Hong's Family"	Nam Hye-seung; Cheon Jung-hoon	2:04
10.	"Mulberry Romance" (오디 로맨스)	Lee So-young	0:46
11.	"Under the Name of Family" (가족이라는 이름)	Nam Hye-seung; Park Sang-hee	1:24
12.	"Still, I" (아직도 나는)	Cho Han-na	1:32
13.	"Spy Team"	Nam Hye-seung; Cheon Jung-hoon	2:10
14.	"On a Warm Day" (어느 따뜻했던 날에)	Nam Hye-seung; Park Sang-hee	1:37
15.	"The Most Precious Thing" (나에게 가장 소중한 것)	Nam Hye-seung; Park Sang-hee	2:45
16.	"BumJa in Love" (범자는 사랑을 먹고)	Nam Hye-seung; Park Sang-hee	1:03
17.	"Talking About"	Nam Hye-seung; Cho Mi-ra	0:56
18.	"The Only Reason" (유일한 이유)	Kim Yong-eun	2:27
19.	"Mo SeulHee" (모슬희)	Nam Hye-seung; Cheon Jung-hoon	1:28
20.	"Sorry and Thank You" (고맙고 미안해)	Lee So-young	3:50
21.	"Grace" (그레이스)	Park Sang-hee	2:03
22.	"Getting Worse" (갈수록 태산)	Nam Hye-seung; Cho Mi-ra	0:50
23.	"Our Way of Love" (우리가 사랑한 방식)	Kim Yong-eun	3:55
24.	"The Shadow of Yoon EunSeong" (윤은성의 그림자)	Nam Hye-seung; Cheon Jung-hoon	1:38
25.	"A Sad Truth" (슬픈 진실)	Nam Hye-seung; Park Sang-hee	1:57
26.	"Guess I Got a Crush" (좋아하나봐)	Nam Hye-seung; Park Sang-hee	1:04
27.	"Tiki-taka" (티키타카)	Nam Hye-seung; Go Eun-jeong	1:45
28.	"The Only One" (힘든순간, 단 한사람)	Lee So-young	1:29
29.	"Requiem"	Cheon Jung-hoon	1:09
30.	"An Endless Obsession" (끝없는 집착)	Nam Hye-seung; Park Sang-hee	3:30
31.	"If We Can Be Together" (함께 할 수 있다면)	Nam Hye-seung; Park Sang-hee	3:20
32.	"Their Own Waltz" (그들만의 왈츠)	Nam Hye-seung; Cho Mi-ra	1:01
33.	"HyunWoo's Manual" (백현우 설명서)	Nam Hye-seung; Park Sang-hee	1:54
34.	"Involuntarily" (나도 모르게)	Nam Hye-seung; Go Eun-jeong	0:30
35.	"With All My Heart" (간절한 마음으로)	Cho Han-na	0:53
36.	"The Things I Like" (내가 좋아하는 것들)	Nam Hye-seung; Cho Mi-ra	1:14
37.	"Please Come Again" (또 오세요)	Nam Hye-seung; Park Sang-hee	1:00
38.	"Yongdu-ri Hair Salon" (용두리 미용실)	Go Eun-jeong	1:08
39.	"Smoke"	Cheon Jung-hoon	2:01
40.	"The Sea" (그날의 바다)	Park Sang-hee	1:16
Total length:			69:49

==== Chart performance ====
Chart performance for Queen of Tears OST
Chart (2024)	Peak position
South Korean Albums (Circle)	9

=== Singles ===
Singles included on the album were released from March 9 to April 27, 2024. A special single from the series, "Way Home" (Korean: 청혼; lit. 'Marriage Proposal'), sung by Kim Soo-hyun, was released on April 29, 2024.

Original soundtrack (Part 1–Special)

Part 1

Released on March 9, 2024
No.	Title	Lyrics	Music	Artist	Length
1.	"The Reason of My Smiles" (자꾸만 웃게 돼)	Nam Hye-seung; Kim Kyung-hee	Nam Hye-seung; Kim Kyung-hee	BSS	3:33
2.	"The Reason of My Smiles" (자꾸만 웃게 돼; Inst.)		Nam Hye-seung; Kim Kyung-hee		3:33
Total length:					7:06

Part 2

Released on March 16, 2024
No.	Title	Lyrics	Music	Artist	Length
1.	"Tell Me It's Not a Dream" (고장난걸까)	Nam Hye-seung; Kim Kyung-hee	Nam Hye-seung; Kim Kyung-hee	10cm	3:55
2.	"Tell Me It's Not a Dream" (Eng ver.)	Nam Hye-seung; Kim Kyung-hee	Nam Hye-seung; Kim Kyung-hee	10cm	3:55
3.	"Tell Me It's Not a Dream" (고장난걸까; Inst.)		Nam Hye-seung; Kim Kyung-hee		3:55
Total length:					11:45

Part 3

Released on March 17, 2024
No.	Title	Lyrics	Music	Artist	Length
1.	"Hold Me Back" (멈춰줘)	Nam Hye-seung; Park Jin-ho	Nam Hye-seung; Park Jin-ho	Heize	3:52
2.	"Hold Me Back" (멈춰줘; Inst.)		Nam Hye-seung; Park Jin-ho		3:52
Total length:					7:44

Part 4

Released on March 24, 2024
No.	Title	Lyrics	Music	Artist	Length
1.	"Love You With All My Heart" (미안해 미워해 사랑해)	Nam Hye-seung; Kim Kyung-hee	Nam Hye-seung; Kim Kyung-hee	Crush	4:04
2.	"Love You With All My Heart" (미안해 미워해 사랑해; Inst.)		Nam Hye-seung; Kim Kyung-hee		4:04
Total length:					8:08

Part 5

Released on March 30, 2024
No.	Title	Lyrics	Music	Artist	Length
1.	"Fallin'"	Nam Hye-seung; Park Jin-ho	Nam Hye-seung; Park Jin-ho	Hong Isaac	4:16
2.	"Fallin'" (Inst.)		Nam Hye-seung; Park Jin-ho		4:16
Total length:					8:32

Part 6

Released on April 6, 2024
No.	Title	Lyrics	Music	Artist	Length
1.	"Can't Get Over You" (좋아해요)	Nam Hye-seung; Park Jin-ho	Nam Hye-seung; Park Jin-ho	Paul Kim	4:05
2.	"Can't Get Over You" (좋아해요; Inst.)		Nam Hye-seung; Park Jin-ho		4:05
Total length:					8:10

Part 7

Released on April 7, 2024
No.	Title	Lyrics	Music	Artist	Length
1.	"From Bottom of My Heart" (일기)	Nam Hye-seung; Kim Kyung-hee	Nam Hye-seung; Kim Kyung-hee	Kim Na-young	3:58
2.	"From Bottom of My Heart" (일기; Inst.)		Nam Hye-seung; Kim Kyung-hee		3:58
Total length:					7:56

Part 8

Released on April 13, 2024
No.	Title	Lyrics	Music	Artist	Length
1.	"Last Chance"	Nam Hye-seung; Park Jin-ho	Nam Hye-seung; Park Jin-ho	So Soo-bin	4:08
2.	"Last Chance" (Inst.)		Nam Hye-seung; Park Jin-ho		4:08
Total length:					8:16

Part 9

Released on April 14, 2024
No.	Title	Lyrics	Music	Artist	Length
1.	"Promise"	Nam Hye-seung; Park Jin-ho	Nam Hye-seung; Park Jin-ho	Choi Yu-ree	3:56
2.	"Promise" (Inst.)		Nam Hye-seung; Park Jin-ho		3:56
Total length:					7:52

Part 10

Released on April 21, 2024
No.	Title	Lyrics	Music	Artist	Length
1.	"Heart Flutter" (떨림)	Nam Hye-seung; Park Jin-ho	Nam Hye-seung; Park Jin-ho	Dori	3:40
2.	"Heart Flutter" (떨림; Inst.)		Nam Hye-seung; Park Jin-ho		3:40
Total length:					7:20

Part 11

Released on April 27, 2024
No.	Title	Lyrics	Music	Artist	Length
1.	"More Than Enough" (더 바랄게 없죠)	Nam Hye-seung; Park Jin-ho	Nam Hye-seung; Park Jin-ho	Kim Tae-rae (Zerobaseone)	4:13
2.	"More Than Enough" (더 바랄게 없죠; Inst.)		Nam Hye-seung; Park Jin-ho		4:13
Total length:					8:26

Special track

Released on April 29, 2024
No.	Title	Lyrics	Music	Artist	Length
1.	"Way Home" (청혼)	Nam Hye-seung; Kim Kyung-hee	Nam Hye-seung; Kim Kyung-hee	Kim Soo-hyun	3:39
2.	"Way Home" (청혼; Inst.)		Nam Hye-seung; Kim Kyung-hee		3:39
Total length:					7:18

==== Chart performance ====
List of singles, showing year released, with selected chart positions and notes
Title	Year	Peak chart positions				Notes
Title	Year	KOR Circle	KOR Songs	US World	WW	Notes
"The Reason of My Smiles" (BSS)	2024	93	—	—	—	Part 1
"Tell Me It's Not a Dream" (10cm)	2024	100	—	—	—	Part 2
"Hold Me Back" (Heize)	2024	46	—	—	—	Part 3
"Love You With All My Heart" (Crush)	2024	6	8	4	184	Part 4
"Fallin'" (Hong Isaac)	2024	97	—	—	—	Part 5
"Can't Get Over You" (Paul Kim)	2024	51	—	—	—	Part 6
"From Bottom of My Heart" (Kim Na-young)	2024	102	—	—	—	Part 7
"Last Chance" (So Soo-bin)	2024	114	—	—	—	Part 8
"Promise" (Choi Yu-ree)	2024	115	—	—	—	Part 9
"Heart Flutter" (Dori)	2024	159	—	—	—	Part 10
"More Than Enough" (Kim Tae-rae)	2024	— (Note: "More Than Enough" did not enter the Circle Digital Chart, but it peaked at number 60 on the Circle Download Chart.)	—	—	—	Part 11
"Way Home" (Kim Soo-hyun)	2024	73	—	—	—	Special
"—" denotes a recording that did not chart or was not released in that region.

== Release ==
Queen of Tears was originally part of tvN's 2023 drama lineup and was scheduled for broadcast in December 2023. However, it was moved to the first half of 2024, due to the changes in the network's Saturday–Sunday lineup. According to a Metro Seoul article, the series was rescheduled to air in March 2024. tvN confirmed the news after releasing its 2024 drama lineup. The series premiered on March 9, 2024, at 21:20 (KST). It is also available for streaming on TVING and Netflix.

== Reception ==
=== Critical response ===
On the review aggregator website Rotten Tomatoes, 100% of 6 critics' reviews are positive, with an average rating of 8.2/10.

Forbes wrote that "many K-dramas end with 'happily ever after', but Queen of Tears starts that way", adding that the series "not only has a solid cast, but boasts a talented screenwriter and two directors with a track record of drama success". Tanu I. Raj of NME gave the series 4 out of 5 stars and described it as "a whirlwind office romance", which is "buoyant and decidedly comic". Geoffrey Bunting of Time described the first six episodes of the series as a "bucks convention, sending up familiar tropes of the genre for a truly unexpected viewing experience". Pierce Conran of South China Morning Post gave a score of 4/5, and wrote that "through 16 episodes threaded between tales of family woes, illness and corporate intrigue" and "Baek Hyun-woo and Hong Hae-in captured each other's hearts, as well as those of the audience at home". Joly Herman of Common Sense Media wrote that "courtesan restraint is definitely not on display in this production, which features dynasty infighting in a current setting with hints of past Korean dramas". Kate Sánchez of But Why Tho? gave a score of 9/10, and stated that "sometimes unwieldy but always entertaining" and "already leading the pack for best drama of the year".

=== Viewership ===
According to Nielsen Korea, the series recorded a nationwide TV rating of 24.850% for its final episode and became the highest-rated tvN series, surpassing Crash Landing on You.

Queen of Tears ranked third in Netflix's Global Top 10 TV (Non-English) category two days after its release and received a strong response from twelve countries, with 5.4 million hours watched by 2.6 million viewers in its first week. It remained on the chart as No. 2 for its second and third week, respectively. On its fourth week, the series topped the chart with 41.4 million hours watched by 4.3 million viewers, and remained on the chart for the next 10 consecutive weeks. Queen of Tears amassed a total of 373.2 million hours during its broadcast run from March 9 to April 28.

According to Netflix's biannual Engagement Report released in September 2024, Queen of Tears was the most-watched Korean drama of all time on Netflix, with 682.6 million hours viewed in total. In addition, it logged 29 million views in total, becoming the 14th most-watched show overall on Netflix as of September 2024 and also ranked third as the most-watched global non-English language series during the first half of 2024.

Queen of Tears : South Korea viewers per episode (millions)

Season	Episode number																Average
Season	1	2	3	4	5	6	7	8	9	10	11	12	13	14	15	16	Average
1	1.519	2.064	2.384	3.126	2.826	3.561	3.276	4.044	4.130	4.741	4.510	5.227	5.217	5.466	5.189	6.399	3.980

Source: Audience measurement performed nationwide by Nielsen Korea.

Average TV viewership ratings
Ep.	Original broadcast date	Average audience share (Nielsen Korea)	
Ep.	Original broadcast date	Nationwide	Seoul
1	March 9, 2024	5.853% (1st)	6.495% (1st)
2	March 10, 2024	8.660% (1st)	9.822% (1st)
3	March 16, 2024	9.594% (1st)	11.125% (1st)
4	March 17, 2024	12.985% (1st)	13.857% (1st)
5	March 23, 2024	10.964% (1st)	12.197% (1st)
6	March 24, 2024	14.068% (1st)	15.225% (1st)
7	March 30, 2024	12.833% (1st)	14.048% (1st)
8	March 31, 2024	16.143% (1st)	17.886% (1st)
9	April 6, 2024	15.570% (1st)	17.236% (1st)
10	April 7, 2024	18.952% (1st)	20.926% (1st)
11	April 13, 2024	16.767% (1st)	18.509% (1st)
12	April 14, 2024	20.732% (1st)	23.242% (1st)
13	April 20, 2024	20.179% (1st)	22.257% (1st)
14	April 21, 2024	21.625% (1st)	23.925% (1st)
15	April 27, 2024	21.056% (1st)	23.920% (1st)
16	April 28, 2024	24.850% (1st)	28.381% (1st)
Average		15.671%	17.441%
Special	May 4, 2024	5.027% (1st)	5.586% (1st)
Special	May 5, 2024	3.896% (1st)	4.070% (1st)
In the table above, the blue numbers represent the lowest ratings and the red numbers represent the highest ratings.; This series aired on a cable channel/pay TV which normally has a relatively smaller audience compared to free-to-air TV/public broadcasters (KBS, SBS, MBC and EBS).

== Accolades ==
=== Awards and nominations ===
Name of the award ceremony, year presented, category, nominee of the award, and the result of the nomination
Award ceremony	Year	Category	Nominee / Work	Result	Ref.
APAN Star Awards	2024	Best Supporting Actor	Jeon Bae-soo	Won	
APAN Star Awards	2024	Best Supporting Actress	Kim Jung-nan	Won	
APAN Star Awards	2024	Best Child Actor	Lee Joo-won	Won	
APAN Star Awards	2024	Best Couple Award	Kim Soo-hyun and Kim Ji-won	Nominated	
APAN Star Awards	2024	Best Drama	Queen of Tears	Nominated	
APAN Star Awards	2024	Best OST	"The Reasons of My Smile" (BSS)	Nominated	
APAN Star Awards	2024	Best OST	"More Than Enough" (Kim Tae-rae (Zerobaseone))	Nominated	
APAN Star Awards	2024	Best Screenwriter	Park Ji-eun	Nominated	
APAN Star Awards	2024	Best Supporting Actor	Kwak Dong-yeon	Nominated	
APAN Star Awards	2024	Best Young Actor	Moon Seong-hyun	Nominated	
APAN Star Awards	2024	Excellence Award, Actress in a Miniseries	Lee Mi-sook	Nominated	
APAN Star Awards	2024	Popularity Star Award, Actor	Kim Soo-hyun	Nominated	
APAN Star Awards	2024	Popularity Star Award, Actress	Kim Ji-won	Nominated	
APAN Star Awards	2024	Top Excellence Award, Actor in a Miniseries	Kim Soo-hyun	Nominated	
APAN Star Awards	2024	Top Excellence Award, Actress in a Miniseries	Kim Ji-won	Nominated	
Asian Academy Creative Awards	2024	Best Direction (Grand Final)	Jang Young-woo and Kim Hee-won	Won	
Asian Academy Creative Awards	2024	Best Direction (National – Korea)	Jang Young-woo and Kim Hee-won	Won	
Asian Academy Creative Awards	2024	Best Screenplay (National – Korea)	Park Ji-eun	Won	
Asian Academy Creative Awards	2024	Best Screenplay (Grand Final)	Park Ji-eun	Nominated	
Asian Pop Music Awards	2024	Best OST (Overseas)	"The Reasons of My Smile" (BSS)	Nominated	
Asian Television Awards	2024	Best Scriptwriting (Grand Final)	Park Ji-eun	Won	
Asian Television Awards	2024	Best Scriptwriting (National – Korea)	Park Ji-eun	Won	
Baeksang Arts Awards	2024	Best Actor (Television)	Kim Soo-hyun	Nominated	
Brand of the Year Awards	2024	Actors of the Year (Drama)	Kim Soo-hyun	Won	
Brand of the Year Awards	2024	Actress of the Year (Drama)	Kim Ji-won	Won	
Brand of the Year Awards	2024	Actors of the Year (Vietnam)	Kim Soo-hyun	Won	
Brand of the Year Awards	2024	Actress of the Year (Vietnam)	Kim Ji-won	Won	
Brand of the Year Awards	2024	Drama of the Year (Vietnam)	Queen of Tears	Won	
Cable TV Broadcasting Awards	2025	PP Special Award (VOD Category)	Queen of Tears	Won	
CJ ENM's 30th Anniversary Visionary Selections	2025	Drama Category	Queen of Tears	Won	
Consumer Rights Day KCA Culture & Entertainment Awards	2024	Best Drama	Queen of Tears	Won	
Daejeon Special Film Festival	2024	Best Supporting Actress	Yoon Bo-mi	Won	
Filmarks Awards	2024	Excellence Award (Streaming Drama)	Queen of Tears	Won	
Filmarks Awards	2024	Grand Prize (Streaming Drama)	Queen of Tears	Nominated	
Financial News New Trend Awards	2024	New Trend Icon Award (Public's Choice) – Film and Drama Category	Kim Ji-won	Won	
FUNdex Awards	2024	Best Actress – TV Drama	Kim Ji-won	Won	
FUNdex Awards	2024	Best TV Drama	Queen of Tears	Won	
FUNdex Awards	2024	Grand Prize (Daesang)	Queen of Tears	Won	
FUNdex Awards	2024	Best Actor – TV Drama	Kim Soo-hyun	Nominated	
Global TV Demand Awards	2025	Most In-Demand Asian Original Series	Queen of Tears	Nominated	
Golden Disc Awards	2025	Best OST	"Love You With All My Heart" (Crush)	Won	
Korea Drama Awards	2024	Best Couple Award	Kim Soo-hyun and Kim Ji-won	Won	
Korea Drama Awards	2024	Best Drama	Queen of Tears	Won	
Korea Drama Awards	2024	Best OST Award	"More Than Enough" (Kim Tae-rae (Zerobaseone))	Won	
Korea Drama Awards	2024	Global Star Award	Kim Soo-hyun	Won	
Korea Drama Awards	2024	Hot Star Award (Female)	Kim Ji-won	Won	
Korea Drama Awards	2024	Best Newcomer Award	Lee Joo-bin	Nominated	
Korea Drama Awards	2024	Best Supporting Actor	Park Sung-hoon	Nominated	
Korea Drama Awards	2024	Best Supporting Actor	Kwak Dong-yeon	Nominated	
Korea Drama Awards	2024	Best Supporting Actress	Kim Jung-nan	Nominated	
Korea Drama Awards	2024	Best Supporting Actress	Jang Yoon-ju	Nominated	
Korea Drama Awards	2024	Global Star Award	Kim Ji-won	Nominated	
Korea Drama Awards	2024	Grand Prize (Daesang)	Kim Soo-hyun	Nominated	
Korea Drama Awards	2024	Grand Prize (Daesang)	Kim Ji-won	Nominated	
Korea Drama Awards	2024	Hot Star Award (Male)	Kim Soo-hyun	Nominated	
K-World Dream Awards	2024	Best OST	"Love You With All My Heart" (Crush)	Won	
Korea First Brand Awards	2025	Best Actor (Vietnam)	Kim Soo-hyun	Won	
Korea First Brand Awards	2025	Best Actress (Vietnam)	Kim Ji-won	Won	
Korea Grand Music Awards	2024	Best OST	"Love You With All My Heart" (Crush)	Nominated	
Korea Grand Music Awards	2024	Best OST	"The Reasons of My Smile" (BSS)	Nominated	
MAMA Awards	2024	Best OST	"Love You With All My Heart" (Crush)	Won	
Melon Music Awards	2024	Best OST	"Love You With All My Heart" (Crush)	Nominated	
Newsis K-Expo Cultural Awards	2024	Minister of Culture, Sports and Tourism Award	Kim Soo-hyun for Queen of Tears	Won	
Seoul International Drama Awards	2024	Outstanding Korean Drama	Queen of Tears	Won (Note: Tied with Moving)	
Seoul International Drama Awards	2024	Outstanding Korean Drama OST	"The Reasons of My Smile" (BSS)	Won	
Seoul International Drama Awards	2024	Asia Star Popularity Award, Actor	Kim Soo-hyun	Nominated	
Seoul International Drama Awards	2024	Asia Star Popularity Award, Actress	Kim Ji-won	Nominated	
Seoul Music Awards	2025	OST Award	"Love You With All My Heart" (Crush)	Nominated	
TAG Awards Chicago	2025	Best Series	Queen of Tears	Won	

=== Listicles ===
Name of publisher, year listed, name of listicle, and placement
Publisher	Year	Listicle	Placement	Ref.
Cine21	2025	Best Content of 2024	2nd place	
Collider	2024	The 10 Most Romantic TV Shows of 2024	6th place	
NME	2024	The 10 Best K-Dramas of 2024 – so far	Included	
NME	2024	The 10 Best Korean Dramas of 2024	1st place	
Screen Rant	2024	20 Best K-Dramas of 2024	1st place	
South China Morning Post	2024	The 15 best K-dramas of 2024	14th place	
Tatler Asia	2024	8 Best K-Drama Releases of 2024	1st place	
Teen Vogue	2024	13 Best K-Dramas of 2024	Included	

== Remake ==
In October 2024, CJ ENM announced that Queen of Tears would have a Turkish remake, in collaboration with O3 Medya and Dass Yapim. It is set to premiere at a later date. It aired under the title Aşk ve Gözyaşı and premiered on September 19, 2025.
