= The Thieves =

- Theatrical release poster
- Hangul: 도둑들
- Hanja: 盜賊들
- RR: Dodukdeul
- MR: Toduktŭl
- Directed by: Choi Dong-hoon
- Written by: Choi Dong-hoon; Lee Ki-cheol
- Produced by: Ahn Soo-hyun
- Starring: Kim Yoon-seok; Kim Hye-soo; Lee Jung-jae; Jun Ji-hyun; Simon Yam; Kim Hae-sook; Oh Dal-su; Kim Soo-hyun; Derek Tsang
- Cinematography: Choi Young-hwan
- Edited by: Shin Min-kyung
- Music by: Jang Young-gyu; Dalpalan
- Distributed by: Showbox/Mediaplex
- Release date: July 25, 2012
- Running time: 136 minutes
- Country: South Korea
- Languages: Korean; Japanese; English; Mandarin; Cantonese
- Budget: US$14.1 million (₩15.2 billion)
- Box office: US$86.7 million

The Thieves (Korean: 도둑들; RR: Dodukdeul) is a 2012 South Korean heist action comedy film directed by Choi Dong-hoon with an ensemble cast. With over 12.9 million ticket sales, the action comedy is the tenth highest-grossing film in Korean film history.

== Plot ==
Yenicall, a cat burglar seduces the owner of Leesung Gallery, and steals a rare artifact with the help of three other partners: Popie, the leader, Zampano, the assistant, and Chewingum, a middle-aged conwoman. They are visited by a detective shortly after and realize that staying in South Korea is too dangerous. They decide to join a heist led by a master thief named Macau Park, a Korean based in Macau who is also Popie's former boss. Popie brings along Pepsee, a convicted safe-cracker who was recently released on parole. In Hong Kong, Chen, Jonny and Andrew are contacted by Macau Park and agree to enroll as the Chinese part of the team, along with a safe-cracker named Julie.

Macau Park reveals the target to be the Tear of the Sun, a valuable diamond in the possession of Tiffany, the mistress of a powerful crime lord named Wei Hong. The plan is to steal the diamond while Tiffany is visiting a casino in Macau, and to sell it back to Wei Hong, a risky venture seeing that Wei Hong is known for murdering whoever offends him. Each team agrees, however, when they find out that the diamond is worth US$20 million. It turns out that Julie is really an undercover cop hoping to arrest Wei Hong. Both the Chinese and Korean teams are mistrustful of Macau Park. Chen, Johnny, and Andrew plan to ignore the diamond and run off with Tiffany's money, while Popie and Pepsee have purchased a fake diamond to swap with the real one. A flashback reveals that Macau Park, Popie, and Pepsee were formerly a team, but Park's cable snapped during an escape as he was rappeling and he ran off with the gold. Worried for his safety, Pepsee inadvertently exposed herself to a security camera, leading to her conviction.

With the help of Tiffany's step-sister, Macau Park lays out the plan. Chen and Chewingum are to pose as a Japanese couple and keep Tiffany occupied at the gambling table. Yenicall and Zampano are to infiltrate Tiffany's private suite through a window and open the door from the inside. Popie, Pepsee, and Julie are to enter the suite and open the two safes, one of which allegedly contains the diamond. As this takes place, Johnny and Andrew must enter the security room and hold the guards at gun-point. All of this has to happen within 10 minutes, after which the police will arrive. Chen and Chewingum find common ground in the Japanese language and end up growing closer. They fall in love over the course of the evening and spend the night together.

Meanwhile, Zampano unsuccessfully prods Yenicall for a confession of love, but she avoids answering by setting the plan in motion. As the plan is being executed, the team discovers that neither of the two safes contains the diamond, much to their dismay. As the police rush in, Chen and Chewingum try to escape in a car, but Chen is shot dead and the car collides with a wall, killing Chewingum. Johnny manages to escape, and so does Yenicall after Zampano surrenders to the police to buy her time. In the commotion, Macau Park, disguised as an old janitor, steals the diamond from a safety deposit box. Popie, Pepsee, and Andrew are arrested but fight inside the police van. Popie, Andrew, and the police jump out before the van plunges into a sea.

However, Pepsee is still handcuffed and nearly drowns, except that Macau Park suddenly arrives and rescues her. Pepsee regroups with Popie, Yenicall, and Andrew, and they force Tiffany's step-sister (who is in fact an actress hired by Macau Park) to reveal Macau Park's place of exchange: the Busan Grand Hotel, located in Busan, South Korea. While the step-sister distracts Macau Park in a cafe, the four break into Macau Park's apartment to search for the diamond. Macau Park reveals that it was Popie who cut the rappelling cable four years ago because he too was in love with Pepsee. When Macau Park tried to find his way back to them, he discovered the two locked in a passionate kiss. Not realizing that it was Pepsee's way of dealing with his "betrayal", he left.

Hearing this via earpiece, Pepsee confronts Popie and then walks off of the job. Yenicall finishes it by taking the real diamond and replacing it with a fake. Macau Park meets with Wei Hong, revealing that his main motive is revenge, as Wei Hong killed Macau Park's father. The meeting is raided by the South Korean police and SWAT and multiple gun-fights ensue. Popie tricks Yenicall into giving him the diamond and then runs away with it, leaving Andrew and Yenicall behind. While running Popiee is hit by a car and the diamond breaks, revealing that this too is a fake, planted by Yenicall. Pepsee is waiting at Busan Pier and spots Macau Park in the crowd, but Wei Hong arrives to kill him and Julie arrives to arrest Pepsee.

After Wei Hong opens fire, Julie turns her attention on Wei Hong and shoots him to death, while Macau Park and Pepsee escape. Pepsee returns to Korea and learns that Yenicall has travelled to Hong Kong again, hoping to find another buyer for the diamond. Pepsee also finds a gift of gold bars left by Macau Park. In the epilogue, Pepsee meets Leesung Gallery's owner, whom Yenicall had seduced, and asking him to buy the diamond. Before the exchange can take place, Macau Park calls Pepsee and reveals that he has infiltrated Yenicall's hotel room and stolen the diamond, and he promises that Pepsee will reunite with him soon.

== Cast ==
- Kim Yoon-seok as Macao Park
  - Seo Young-joo as young Macao Park
- Kim Hye-soo as Pepsee
- Lee Jung-jae as Popie
- Jun Ji-hyun as Yenicall
- Simon Yam as Chen
- Kim Hae-sook as Chewingum
- Oh Dal-su as Andrew
- Kim Soo-hyun as Zampano
- Derek Tsang as Johnny
- Joo Jin-mo as detective
- Ki Gook-seo as Wei Hong
- Ye Soo-jung as Tiffany
- Chae Gook-hee as informant
- Choi Deok-moon as casino manager
- Jang Joon-nyung as detective
- Choi Jin-ho as One Eye
- Son Byung-wook as Young-sik
- Na Kwang-hoon as chief of criminal investigation
- Angelica Lee as Julie (special appearance)
- Shin Ha-kyun as art gallery owner (special appearance)
- Kim Young-woong as right side building detective

== Production ==
Casting negotiations began since late 2010, and on March 21, 2011, film distributor Showbox confirmed the star-studded cast in a press release. Director Choi Dong-hoon was quoted: "These are the very actors that inspired me to write what I have for the movie's script starting from its first line. I'm dreaming of creating explosive ensembles that will clash or harmonize within a single movie due to their different styles." Choi later confessed that the thought of directing this group of high-profile actors and actresses was "really scary", but "during filming, I couldn't take my eyes off the monitor because of the charisma of all these actors. Never did it occur to me that they needed to be handled in a certain way. It's just that the screenplay must be fully understood... We talk. Slowly infect them with my thoughts, mixing the individual with the movie's tone and manner."

Calling Choi "a genius who also works extremely hard," actress Kim Hye-soo was in awe when she first read the script, saying, "It was a product of great effort, genius ideas and a detail-oriented, calculative mind. I think he knows who he is, the exact kind of films that he wants to make, and how to make them. The Thieves proves it."

On comparisons with Ocean's Eleven, the director said he never went into production consciously thinking about the hit Hollywood film. Though similar to it, he thinks The Thieves is actually closer to his previous films The Big Swindle and Tazza: The High Rollers, with the action featured "invested with more emotion." Kim Yoon-seok added that contrary to the characters' compatible and harmonious collaboration in Ocean's Eleven, "In The Thieves, we are all over the place, all with our own faults. But I think that you will see through the friendships and love in the film, our unique emotional developments will show through."

After six months of location shoots in Seoul, Busan, Macau, and Hong Kong, filming wrapped up on December 7, 2011.

== Box office ==
With 436,622 tickets sold on the day of its release, The Thieves recorded the second highest single day opening of all time in Korea after The Host opened with 449,500 tickets sold in 2006. On its sixth day of release, it broke the 3 million mark in audience number, drawing 3.35 million viewers. In eight days, the numbers had risen to 4,365,078 tickets, by the eleventh day, it drew 6.2 million viewers, by the thirteenth day, 7 million, and over 8 million by the sixteenth day.

After 22 days, it reached the "magic number" of 10 million viewers, only the sixth film to have done so in Korean film history. Kim Soo-hyun then fulfilled his public pledge to give a piggyback ride to the 10 millionth ticket holder, a middle school girl.

After reaching over 11 million viewers on its fourth week, it rose to number 4 on the Korean all-time box office charts, beating Haeundae. It then passed 12 million to leapfrog over Taegukgi, and on its sixth week its 12.31 million overtook King and the Clown's record to become the second highest-grossing movie in Korean film history.

Though the film's promoter sent out a press release that The Thieves reached 13,020,393 admissions on October 2 (70 days since its opening), making it the highest on the all-time box office chart, the Korean Film Council reported the actual admissions to be at 12,983,334 — leaving the previous record of The Host unbroken.

== International release ==
The distribution rights to the picture were purchased by several countries including Singapore, Malaysia, Brunei, Indonesia, Taiwan, China, Hong Kong, Thailand, and Vietnam. It made its North American premiere at the 2012 Toronto International Film Festival, and was distributed in the US by Well Go USA Entertainment. Well Go released it on DVD and Blu-ray on February 12, 2013.

=== Film festivals ===
Year	Festival	Section	Notes
2012	37th Toronto International Film Festival	Contemporary World Cinema	
2012	17th Busan International Film Festival	Open Cinema	
2012	45th Sitges Film Festival	Official Fantàstic Casa Asia	
2012	32nd Hawaii International Film Festival	Closing Film	U.S. Premiere
2012	21st Philadelphia Film Festival	World Narrative	
2013	15th Deauville Asian Film Festival	Non-Competing	
2013	15th Udine Far East Film		Italian Premiere
2013	4th Korean Film Festival in Australia	Closing Film	
2022	21st New York Asian Film Festival	Genre Masters	

== Awards and nominations ==
Year	Award	Category	Recipient	Result
2012	21st Buil Film Awards	Best Director	Choi Dong-hoon	Nominated
2012	21st Buil Film Awards	Best Supporting Actress	Kim Hae-sook	Nominated
2012	21st Buil Film Awards	Best New Actor	Kim Soo-hyun	Nominated
2012	21st Buil Film Awards	Best Cinematography	Choi Young-hwan	Won
2012	21st Buil Film Awards	Best Art Direction	Lee Ha-jun	Won
2012	21st Buil Film Awards	Buil Readers' Jury Award	The Thieves	Won
2012	49th Grand Bell Awards	Best Director	Choi Dong-hoon	Nominated
2012	49th Grand Bell Awards	Best Supporting Actress	Kim Hae-sook	Won
2012	32nd Korean Association of Film Critics Awards	Best Cinematography	Choi Young-hwan	Won
2012	33rd Blue Dragon Film Awards	Best Film	The Thieves	Nominated
2012	33rd Blue Dragon Film Awards	Best Director	Choi Dong-hoon	Nominated
2012	33rd Blue Dragon Film Awards	Best Supporting Actress	Kim Hae-sook	Nominated
2012	33rd Blue Dragon Film Awards	Best New Actor	Kim Soo-hyun	Nominated
2012	33rd Blue Dragon Film Awards	Best Screenplay	Choi Dong-hoon, Lee Ki-cheol	Nominated
2012	33rd Blue Dragon Film Awards	Best Cinematography	Choi Young-hwan	Nominated
2012	33rd Blue Dragon Film Awards	Best Lighting	Kim Sung-kwan	Nominated
2012	33rd Blue Dragon Film Awards	Technical Award	Yoo Sang-sub, Jung Yoon-hyun	Won
2012	33rd Blue Dragon Film Awards	Popularity Award	Kim Soo-hyun	Won
2012	33rd Blue Dragon Film Awards	Audience Choice Award for Most Popular Film	The Thieves	Won
2012	20th Korean Culture and Entertainment Awards	Grand Prize (Daesang)	Kim Yoon-seok	Won
2012	20th Korean Culture and Entertainment Awards	Best Film	The Thieves	Won
2012	20th Korean Culture and Entertainment Awards	Top Excellence Award, Actress in Film	Kim Hye-soo	Won
2012	13th Women in Film Korea Awards	Best Producer	Ahn Soo-hyun	Won
2013	4th KOFRA Film Awards	Best Supporting Actress	Kim Hae-sook	Won
2013	7th Asian Film Awards	Best Supporting Actress	Kim Hye-soo	Nominated
2013	7th Asian Film Awards	Best Supporting Actress	Jun Ji-hyun	Nominated
2013	7th Asian Film Awards	Best Cinematography	Choi Young-hwan	Nominated
2013	7th Asian Film Awards	Best Editing	Shin Min-kyung	Nominated
2013	49th Baeksang Arts Awards	Best Director	Choi Dong-hoon	Nominated
2013	49th Baeksang Arts Awards	Best Supporting Actress	Jun Ji-hyun	Nominated
