= Memories of the Alhambra =

2018 South Korean television series

- Promotional poster
- Hangul: 알함브라 궁전의 추억
- RR: Alhambeura gungjeonui chueok
- MR: Arhambŭra kungjŏnŭi ch'uŏk
- Genre: Science fantasy Action; Thriller; Romance
- Created by: Choi Jin-hee (Studio Dragon); Lee Myung-han (tvN)
- Written by: Song Jae-jeong
- Directed by: Ahn Gil-ho
- Starring: Hyun Bin; Park Shin-hye
- Composer: Jeong Se-rin
- Country of origin: South Korea
- Original language: Korean
- No. of episodes: 16

Production
- Executive producers: Cho Hyung-jin; Kim Sang-heon
- Production locations: Granada, Spain; Madrid, Spain; Barcelona, Spain; Girona, Spain; Budapest, Hungary; Mezőtúr, Hungary; Ljubljana, Slovenia; South Korea
- Camera setup: Single camera
- Production companies: Studio Dragon; Chorokbaem Media
- Budget: ₩20 billion

Original release
- Network: tvN
- Release: December 1, 2018 – January 20, 2019

Memories of the Alhambra (Korean: 알함브라 궁전의 추억) is a 2018 South Korean television series, starring Hyun Bin and Park Shin-hye. Primarily set in Spain (and in South Korea in later episodes), the series centers on a company CEO and a hostel owner who get entangled in a series of mysterious incidents surrounding a new and intricate augmented reality game inspired by the stories of the Alhambra Palace. It aired on cable network tvN from December 1, 2018, to January 20, 2019, every Saturday and Sunday at 21:00 (KST). It is also available for online streaming on Netflix.

The drama is one of the highest-rated Korean dramas in cable television history, and was praised for its creative plot and its unexpected twists. Its title also alludes to Francisco Tárrega's eponymous classical guitar piece Recuerdos de la Alhambra, which is also a part of the series' soundtrack.

== Synopsis ==
After receiving an email regarding a groundbreaking AR game about medieval battles in the Alhambra, Yoo Jin-woo (Hyun Bin), CEO of an investment company that specializes in optical devices, travels to Granada, Spain to meet the creator of the game, Jung Se-joo (Park Chan-yeol). However, Se-joo has gone missing and there, Jin-woo meets Se-joo's older sister, Jung Hee-joo (Park Shin-hye), who is the owner of the hostel he stays in and a former guitarist. Both get entangled in mysterious incidents, as the border between the areal world and the AR world built by Se-joo begins to blur.

== Cast ==
=== Main ===
- Hyun Bin as Yoo Jin-woo

CEO of investment company called J One Holdings and a Doctor of Engineering, who is talented at developing games. He is fearless, adventurous and cynical. His AR game ID is "zinu" and he is the highest-level player in the game.

- Park Shin-hye as Jung Hee-joo / Emma
  - Lee Chae-yoon as young Hee-joo

Jung Hee-joo: Owner of Hostal Bonita. A former classic guitarist who came to Spain for further studies, but took on several jobs there to sustain livelihood following the death of her parents. She has artistic sensibility but zero financial sense.
Emma: An NPC character in the AR game created by Se-joo based on Hee-joo.

=== Supporting ===
==== People around Jung Hee-joo ====
- Park Chan-yeol as Jung Se-joo
  - Kim Jun-eui as young Se-joo

Hee-joo's younger brother. A genius reclusive programmer who develops an intricate augmented reality game. It is later revealed that, after killing Marco, he is forced into hiding in the Instance Dungeon until Jin-woo freed him. His AR game ID is "master".

- Kim Yong-rim as Oh Young-shim

Hee-joo's caring grandmother.

- Lee Re as Jung Min-joo
  - Park Chae-hee as young Min-joo

Hee-joo's younger sister. She dreams of becoming a girl group member.

- Lee Hak-joo as Kim Sang-bum

A classic guitarist and an international student in Spain. He is close to Hee-joo and cares for her, but often oversteps his boundaries.

==== People around Yoo Jin-woo ====
- Park Hoon as Cha Hyung-seok

The CEO of IT company Neword and a Doctor of Engineering. Jin-woo's college friend and co-founder of J One Holdings, who later betrayed him and became his biggest rival. His AR game ID is "Mr. Cha".

- Lee Seung-joon as Park Seon-ho

The Business Strategy Director and co-founder of J One Holdings, who is Jin-woo's college senior. He is later promoted to CEO of J One Holdings.

- Min Jin-woong as Seo Jung-hoon

Jin-woo's loyal secretary. He was killed by NPCs created by the bug due to being Jin-woo's ally. His AR game ID is "City Hunter" (시티헌터; Siti heonteo).

- Cho Hyun-chul as Choi Yang-joo

The Head of R&D Center Research Team of J One Holdings. He creates special game weapons for Jin-woo to help him defeat NPCs created by the bug, and survive.

- Lee Si-won as Lee Soo-jin

Jin-woo's first ex-wife; Hyung-seok's current wife who is pregnant. A pediatrician.

- Kim Eui-sung as Cha Byung-jun

The selfish and greedy Professor of Business Administration at a university in Seoul, who is also Hyung-seok's father. He is later killed by NPCs created by the bug in his attempt to indirectly cause Jin-woo's death by restarting the game.

- Ryu Abel as Lee Soo-kyung

Soo-jin's younger sister, who is a florist.

=== Others ===
- Han Bo-reum as Ko Yoo-ra

Jin-woo's second ex-wife, who is an extremely vain and impulsive celebrity with a drinking habit.

- Lee Jae-wook as Marco Han

A programmer and hacker who is affiliated with Se-joo. He was accidentally killed by Se-joo due to a bug caused by their physical contact while duelling. His AR game ID is "marco".

- Park Jin-woo as Noh Young-jun

Yoo-ra's manager and ex-boyfriend.

=== Special appearances ===
- Park Hae-soo as A (Ep. 1, 2, 4, 8): A detective who collects intelligence for Jin-woo.
- Jung Min-sung as Hee-joo's father (Ep. 3)
- Choi Yoo-song as Hee-joo's mother (Ep. 3)
- Han Da-sol as Gamer (Ep. 3): An international student.
- Kim Hyun-mok as J One Employee (Ep. 7, 10, 16)
- Park Seul-gi as Entertainment News Program Reporter (Ep. 7, 16)
- Park Jong-jin as Live Weekly News Host who reported on Cha Hyung-suk's death
- Eom Seong-seop as Live Weekly News Reporter who reported on Cha Hyung-suk's death

== Production ==
The series is helmed by director Ahn Gil-ho, who directed Stranger and writer Song Jae-jeong whose previous works include W and Queen and I.

Touted as Korea's first augmented reality-gaming drama, Memories of the Alhambra was revealed to be inspired by tech mogul Elon Musk and the Pokémon Go game.

The first script reading took place in May 2018.

Overseas filming took place in several cities in Andalucía and Catalonia, such as Granada (Andalucía), and Barcelona and Girona (some interiors and exteriors) and Terrassa (exteriors and film studios) in Catalonia from late May to June. In early August, the cast started filming in Budapest, Hungary and Slovenia. The script for the last episode was completed on December 19, 2018 and filming wrapped up on December 29, 2018 in South Korea.

A preview screening event was held at CGV theaters on November 28, 2018 prior to the airing of the first episode.

== Original soundtrack ==
Memories of the Alhambra OST

Soundtrack album by Various artists
- Released: January 21, 2019
- Recorded: 2018
- Genre: Soundtrack
- Length: 125:45
- Languages: Korean; English
- Labels: Stone Music Entertainment; Genie Music

No.	Title	Artist	Length
1.	"Star (Little Prince)" (별 (Little Prince))	Loco; U Sung-eun	3:02
2.	"Daydream" (백일몽)	Elaine	4:10
3.	"Is You"	Ailee	4:26
4.	"Memories of the Alhambra" (알함브라 궁전의 추억)	George	3:05
5.	"I'm Here"	Yang Da-il	3:46
6.	"Maybe We" (우린 어쩌면)	Eddy Kim	4:54
7.	"I'm Here" (Guitar Solo Ver.)	Jung Jae-pil	3:46
8.	"Inevitable duel" (피할 수 없는 결투)	Jeong Se-Rin	3:07
9.	"The Beginning of Magic" (마법의 시작)	Jeong Se-Rin	4:27
10.	"Delusion and Truth" (망상과 진실)	Ju In-ro	3:00
11.	"New Enemies Detected" (새로운 적 발견)	Kim Hyun-do	2:21
12.	"Death in Granada"	Lee Roo-ri	2:15
13.	"Unreal Reality" (비현실 같은 현실)	Lee Roo-ri	2:32
14.	"The World of Mystery" (신비의 세계)	Noh Yoo-rim	2:54
15.	"Connection Error" (접속 오류)	Lee Roo-ri	2:23
16.	"Accidental Encounter" (우연한 만남)	Lee Yoon-ji	3:33
17.	"Magical Reality Drawn In Front of the Eyes" (눈앞에 그려진 마법 같은 현실)	Lee Yoon-ji	2:11
18.	"Hostel Bonita" (보니따 호스텔)	Lee Roo-ri	2:15
19.	"Embarrassing Incident" (당황스러운 사건)	Lee Yoon-ji	1:38
20.	"Victory Achieved" (승리 달성)	Kim Hyun-do	2:33
21.	"Play Harder" (게임 노가다)	Goo Bon-chun	2:57
22.	"Three Dimensional Space" (3차원의 공간)	Kim Hyun-do	2:21
23.	"Beyond Limits Game" (한계를 넘어선 게임)	Jeong Se-Rin	2:55
24.	"Alliance Made" (동맹을 맺었습니다)	Jeong Se-Rin	3:05
25.	"Item He Left" (그가 남긴 아이템)	Jeong Se-Rin	3:17
26.	"Stories Started in Granada" (그라나다에서 시작된 이야기)	Seo Ye-rin	3:01
27.	"Hola!"	Lee Roo-ri	2:31
28.	"Bad Day" (잘 안 풀리는 하루)	Lee Yoon-ji	2:40
29.	"You're Kidding...?" (농담이시죠...?)	Noh Yoo-rim	2:06
30.	"The Master of Mind Game" (밀당의 고수)	Shin Yoo-jin	1:29
31.	"Complex Mind" (복잡한 마음)	Kim Hyun-joo	2:28
32.	"Anxious Time" (불안한 시간)	Lee Yoon-ji	2:40
33.	"Lost Se-ju" (사라진 세주)	Lee Yoon-ji	3:44
34.	"Dangerous Quest" (위험한 퀘스트)	Joo In-ro	2:33
35.	"Virtual or Reality" (가상 또는 현실)	Kim Hyun-do	2:55
36.	"Inner Conflict" (내면의 갈등)	Noh Yoo-rim	2:10
37.	"Jin-woo's Fear" (진우의 두려움)	Shin Yoo-jin	2:57
38.	"Endless Hallucinations" (끝없는 환각)	Noh Yoo-rim	2:29
39.	"New User" (새로운 유저)	Noh Yoo-rim	2:29
40.	"Save Me, Boss" (살려주세요 대표님)	Kim Hyun-do	2:37
41.	"Mysterious Whereabouts" (묘연한 행방)	Seo Ye-rin	3:34
42.	"Recuerdos de la Alhambra" (by Francisco Tárrega)	Jang Dae-geon	4:24
Total length:			125:45

OST Part 1–6

=== Part 1 ===
Released on December 8, 2018
No.	Title	Lyrics	Music	Artist	Length
1.	"Star (Little Prince)" (별 (Little Prince))	Loco; Kako; Curtis F; NATHAN	Kako; Curtis F; NATHAN	Loco; U Sung-eun	3:02
2.	"Star (Little Prince)" (Inst.)		Kako; Curtis F; NATHAN		3:02
Total length:					6:04

=== Part 2 ===
Released on December 15, 2018
No.	Title	Lyrics	Music	Artist	Length
1.	"Daydream" (백일몽)	Seo Dong-sung	Park Sung-il	Elaine	4:10
2.	"Daydream" (Inst.)		Park Sung-il		4:10
Total length:					8:20

=== Part 3 ===
Released on December 22, 2018
No.	Title	Lyrics	Music	Artist	Length
1.	"Is You"	Curtis F; Kako	Curtis F; Kako; Jung Dong-hwan	Ailee	4:26
2.	"Is You" (Inst.)		Curtis F; Kako; Jung Dong-hwan		4:26
Total length:					8:52

=== Part 4 ===
Released on December 30, 2018
No.	Title	Lyrics	Music	Artist	Length
1.	"Memories of the Alhambra" (알함브라 궁전의 추억)	Park Woo-sang	Park Woo-sang	George	3:05
2.	"Memories of the Alhambra" (Inst.)		Park Woo-sang		3:05
Total length:					6:10

=== Part 5 ===
Released on January 6, 2019
No.	Title	Lyrics	Music	Artist	Length
1.	"I'm Here"	Kim Min	Kim Min; Taylor	Yang Da-il	3:46
2.	"I'm Here" (Inst.)		Kim Min; Taylor		3:46
Total length:					7:32

=== Part 6 ===
Released on January 13, 2019
No.	Title	Lyrics	Music	Artist	Length
1.	"Maybe We" (우린 어쩌면)	Seo Dong-sung	Park Sung-il	Eddy Kim	4:54
2.	"Maybe We" (Inst.)		Park Sung-il		4:54
Total length:					9:48

== Reception ==
Memories of the Alhambra was a commercial success, consistently topping the cable television viewership ratings in its timeslot. Its 14th episode recorded a 10.025% nationwide audience share according to Nielsen paid platform, making it as one of the highest rated in Korean cable television history.

The drama has attracted attention for its unique theme of augmented reality; and earned praise for its high-end computer graphics, cinematography and fast-paced storytelling. Critic Jeong Seok-hee praised the drama for its mysterious and captivating plot that held viewers' attention until the very end, and that it "has the potential to become one of the very best TV dramas we have seen in years". However, later on it received criticism for its confusing development and slow development of plot, and its excessive product placement.

According to the Korean Foundation for International Cultural Exchange, the series is receiving favorable reviews and popularity in China for its actors' performance, cinematography and fresh story.

=== Viewership ===
Memories of the Alhambra : South Korea viewers per episode (millions)

Season	Episode number																Average
Season	1	2	3	4	5	6	7	8	9	10	11	12	13	14	15	16	Average
1	1.875	2.006	1.812	2.250	1.856	2.070	1.828	2.366	2.045	2.575	2.454	2.828	2.480	2.853	2.418	2.751	2.279

Source: Audience measurement performed nationwide by Nielsen Media Research.

Average TV viewership ratings
Ep.	Original broadcast date	Average audience share (Nielsen Korea)	
Ep.	Original broadcast date	Nationwide	Seoul
1	December 1, 2018	7.507% (1st)	9.188% (1st)
2	December 2, 2018	7.363% (1st)	9.179% (1st)
3	December 8, 2018	6.950% (1st)	8.788% (1st)
4	December 9, 2018	8.154% (1st)	11.180% (1st)
5	December 15, 2018	6.829% (1st)	8.351% (1st)
6	December 16, 2018	7.863% (1st)	10.206% (1st)
7	December 22, 2018	7.442% (1st)	9.921% (1st)
8	December 23, 2018	8.504% (1st)	11.200% (1st)
9	December 29, 2018	7.563% (1st)	9.797% (1st)
10	December 30, 2018	9.207% (1st)	11.776% (1st)
11	January 5, 2019	9.431% (1st)	12.440% (1st)
12	January 6, 2019	9.851% (1st)	13.592% (1st)
13	January 12, 2019	9.316% (1st)	11.841% (1st)
14	January 13, 2019	10.025% (1st)	12.996% (1st)
15	January 19, 2019	9.004% (1st)	11.450% (1st)
16	January 20, 2019	9.933% (1st)	12.383% (1st)
Average		8.434%	10.893%
Special	December 21, 2018	3.341%	4.319%
In the table above, the blue numbers represent the lowest ratings and the red numbers represent the highest ratings.; This drama aired on a cable channel/pay TV which normally has a relatively smaller audience compared to free-to-air TV/public broadcasters (KBS, SBS, MBC and EBS).

== Awards and nominations ==
Year	Award	Category	Recipient	Result	Ref.
2019	55th Baeksang Arts Awards	Best Director	Ahn Gil-ho	Nominated	
2019	55th Baeksang Arts Awards	Best Actor	Hyun Bin	Nominated	
2019	55th Baeksang Arts Awards	Best New Actor	Park Hoon	Nominated	
2019	55th Baeksang Arts Awards	Technical Award	Park Sung-jin (Special effects)	Won	
2019	12th Korea Drama Awards	Top Excellence Award, Actress	Park Shin-hye	Nominated	

== International broadcast ==
- Memories of the Alhambra was broadcast on Netflix in Asia and English-speaking territories an hour after its broadcast in Korea. In Japan, the drama was broadcast on December 2, while in Europe, South America and the rest of the world, it was launched starting December 11.
