= 53rd Baeksang Arts Awards =

2017 edition of award ceremony

- Date: May 3, 2017
- Site: Hall D, COEX, Seoul
- Hosted by: Park Joong-hoon; Bae Suzy
- Organised by: Ilgan Sports; JTBC Plus

Highlights
- Grand Prize – Film: Park Chan-wook (director & co-screenwriter) – The Handmaiden
- Grand Prize – TV: Kim Eun-sook (screenwriter) – Guardian: The Lonely and Great God
- Website: http://www.baeksangawards.co.kr/

Television/radio coverage
- Network: JTBC

The 53rd Baeksang Arts Awards (Korean: 제53회 백상예술대상) ceremony was held on May 3, 2017, at Hall D, COEX in Seoul. It was broadcast live on JTBC and was hosted by Park Joong-hoon and Bae Suzy. Organised by Ilgan Sports and JTBC Plus, it is South Korea's only awards ceremony which recognises excellence in both film and television.

== Winners and nominees ==
- Winners are listed first and highlighted in **boldface**.
  - Nominees

=== Film ===
**Grand Prize**
**Park Chan-wook (director and co-screenwriter) – The Handmaiden**
**Best Film**	**Best Director**
**The Wailing**; The Age of Shadows; Train to Busan; The Handmaiden; Asura: The City of Madness	**Kim Ji-woon – The Age of Shadows**; Kim Sung-su – Asura: The City of Madness; Na Hong-jin – The Wailing; Park Chan-wook – The Handmaiden; Hong Sang-soo – On the Beach at Night Alone
**Best New Director**	**Best Screenplay**
**Yeon Sang-ho – Train to Busan**; Yoon Ga-eun – The World of Us; Lee Yo-seob – The Queen of Crime; Lee Joo-young – Single Rider; Lee Hyun-joo – Our Love Story	**Yoon Ga-eun – The World of Us**; Na Hong-jin – The Wailing; Lee Ji-min, Park Jong-dae – The Age of Shadows; Park Chan-wook, Jung Seo-kyung – The Handmaiden; Kim Sung-su – Asura: The City of Madness
**Best Actor**	**Best Actress**
**Song Kang-ho – The Age of Shadows**; Kwak Do-won – The Wailing; Yoo Hae-jin – Luck Key; Lee Byung-hun – Master; Ha Jung-woo – The Tunnel	**Son Ye-jin – The Last Princess**; Kim Min-hee – The Handmaiden; Kim Hye-soo – Familyhood; Youn Yuh-jung – The Bacchus Lady; Han Ye-ri – Worst Woman
**Best Supporting Actor**	**Best Supporting Actress**
**Kim Eui-sung – Train to Busan**; Ma Dong-seok – Train to Busan; Bae Sung-woo – The King; Uhm Tae-goo – The Age of Shadows; Cho Jin-woong – The Handmaiden	**Kim So-jin – The King**; Ra Mi-ran – The Last Princess; Bae Doona – The Tunnel; Chun Woo-hee – The Wailing; Han Ji-min – The Age of Shadows
**Best New Actor**	**Best New Actress**
**Ryu Jun-yeol – The King**; Do Kyung-soo – My Annoying Brother; Woo Do-hwan – Master; Ji Chang-wook – Fabricated City; Han Jae-young – New Trial	**Lee Sang-hee – Our Love Story**; Kim Tae-ri – The Handmaiden; Kim Hwan-hee – The Wailing; Lim Yoona – Confidential Assignment; Choi Soo-in – The World of Us
**Most Popular Actor**	**Most Popular Actress**
**Do Kyung-soo – My Annoying Brother**; Kang Ha-neul – New Trial; Kwak Do-won – The Wailing; Kim Nam-gil – Pandora; Kim Woo-bin – Master; Ryu Jun-yeol – The King; Ma Dong-seok – Train to Busan; Bae Seong-woo – The King; Song Kang-ho – The Age of Shadows; Ha Jung-woo – The Tunnel; Hyun Bin – Confidential Assignment; Park Jin-young – A Stray Goat; Xiumin – Seondal: The Man Who Sells the River; Yoo Hae-jin – Luck Key; Lee Byung-hun – Master; Jung Woo – New Trial; Jung Woo-sung – The King; Jo In-sung – The King; Ji Chang-wook – Fabricated City; Hwang Jung-min – The Wailing	**Lim Yoona – Confidential Assignment**; Go Ara – Phantom Detective; Kim Min-hee – The Handmaiden; Kim Tae-ri – The Handmaiden; Kim Hae-sook – The Handmaiden; Kim Hye-soo – Familyhood; Kim Hwan-hee – The Wailing; Ra Mi-ran – The Last Princess; Bae Doona – The Tunnel; Seo Yea-ji – Another Way; Son Ye-jin – The Last Princess; Soo Ae – Run-off; Shim Eun-kyung – Queen of Walking; Ahn So-hee – Single Rider; Uhm Ji-won – Missing; Youn Yuh-jung – The Bacchus Lady; Jung Yu-mi – Train to Busan; Chun Woo-hee – The Wailing; Han Ye-ri – Worst Woman; Han Ji-min – The Age of Shadows

==== Films with multiple awards ====
The following films received multiple awards:

Wins	Films
2	The Age of Shadows
2	The King
2	Train to Busan

==== Films with multiple nominations ====
The following films received multiple nominations:

Nominations	Films
6	The Age of Shadows
6	The Handmaiden
6	The Wailing
4	Train to Busan
3	Asura: The City of Madness
3	The King
3	The World of Us
2	The Last Princess
2	Tunnel

=== Television ===
**Grand Prize**	**Best Drama**
**Kim Eun-sook (screenwriter) – Guardian: The Lonely and Great God**	**Dear My Friends**; W - Two Worlds; Love in the Moonlight; Dr. Romantic; Guardian: The Lonely and Great God
**Best Entertainment Program**	**Best Educational Show**
**My Little Old Boy**; I Live Alone; Show Me the Money 5; Knowing Bros; Phantom Singer	**Ssulzun**; Unanswered Questions; Docuprime Democracy; Special Knowledge; Imjin War 1592
**Best Director**	**Best Screenplay**
**Yoo In-shik – Dr. Romantic**; Song Hyun-wook – Another Miss Oh; Lee Eung-bok – Guardian: The Lonely and Great God; Jung Dae-yoon – W - Two Worlds; Hong Jong-chan – Dear My Friends	**Noh Hee-kyung – Dear My Friends**; Kim Eun-sook – Guardian: The Lonely and Great God; Kang Eun-kyung – Dr. Romantic; Park Hae-young – Another Miss Oh; Song Jae-jeong – W - Two Worlds
**Best Actor**	**Best Actress**
**Gong Yoo – Guardian: The Lonely and Great God**; Namkoong Min – Good Manager; Park Bo-gum – Love in the Moonlight; Jo Jung-suk – Don't Dare to Dream; Han Suk-kyu – Dr. Romantic	**Seo Hyun-jin – Another Miss Oh**; Kim Go-eun – Guardian: The Lonely and Great God; Kim Ha-neul – On the Way to the Airport; Park Bo-young – Strong Girl Bong-soon; Park Shin-hye – The Doctors
**Best New Actor**	**Best New Actress**
**Kim Min-seok – The Doctors**; Gong Myung – Drinking Solo; Kim Min-jae – Dr. Romantic; Ji Soo – Strong Girl Bong-soon; Jinyoung – Love in the Moonlight	**Lee Se-young – The Gentlemen of Wolgyesu Tailor Shop**; Kang Han-na – Moon Lovers: Scarlet Heart Ryeo; Gong Seung-yeon – The Master of Revenge; Bang Min-ah – Beautiful Gong Shim; Nana – The Good Wife
**Best Male Variety Performer**	**Best Female Variety Performer**
**Yang Se-hyung – Shorterview**; Kim Gook-jin – Flaming Youth; Kim Jong-min – 2 Days & 1 Night; Park Soo-hong – My Little Old Boy; Yu Min-sang – Gag Concert	**Park Na-rae – I Live Alone**; Kim Sook – Sister's Slam Dunk; Lee Soo-ji – Gag Concert; Jang Do-yeon – Comedy Big League; Hong Yoon-hwa – People Looking for a Laugh
**Most Popular Actor**	**Most Popular Actress**
**Park Bo-gum – Love in the Moonlight**; Gong Yoo – Guardian: The Lonely and Great God; Yoon Kye-sang – The Good Wife; Lee Dong-wook – Guardian: The Lonely and Great God; Lee Min-ho – The Legend of the Blue Sea; Lee Jong-suk – W; Lee Joon-gi – Moon Lovers: Scarlet Heart Ryeo; Jung Kyung-ho – Missing 9; Jo Jung-suk – Don't Dare to Dream; Byun Baek-hyun – Moon Lovers: Scarlet Heart Ryeo; Nam Joo-hyuk – Weightlifting Fairy Kim Bok-joo; Cho Jin-woong – Entourage; Ji Sung – Defendant; Jinyoung – Love in the Moonlight; Namkoong Min – Good Manager; Ha Seok-jin – Drinking Solo; Eric Mun – Another Miss Oh; Yook Sung-jae – Guardian: The Lonely and Great God; Park Hyung-sik – Strong Girl Bong-soon; Seo In-guk – Shopaholic Louis	**Kim You-jung – Love in the Moonlight**; Kim Ha-neul – On the Way to the Airport; Nana – The Good Wife; Nam Ji-hyun – Shopaholic Louis; Bang Min-ah – Beautiful Gong Shim; Park Bo-young – Strong Girl Bong-soon; Han Hyo-joo – W; Gong Seung-yeon – The Master of Revenge; Gong Hyo-jin – Don't Dare to Dream; Kim Go-eun – Guardian: The Lonely and Great God; Seo Hyun-jin – Another Miss Oh; Yoo In-na – Guardian: The Lonely and Great God; Lee Se-young – The Gentlemen of Wolgyesu Tailor Shop; Lee Young-ae – Saimdang, Light's Diary; IU – Moon Lovers: Scarlet Heart Ryeo; Jeon Do-yeon – The Good Wife; Jun Ji-hyun – The Legend of the Blue Sea; Park Shin-hye – The Doctors; Park Ha-sun – Drinking Solo; Park Hye-su – Age of Youth

==== Programs with multiple awards ====
The following television programs received multiple awards:

Wins	Television programs
2	Dear My Friends
2	Guardian: The Lonely and Great God

==== Programs with multiple nominations ====
The following television programs received multiple nominations:

Nominations	Television programs
5	Dr. Romantic
5	Guardian: The Lonely and Great God
3	Another Miss Oh
3	Dear My Friends
3	Love in the Moonlight
3	W - Two Worlds
2	The Doctors
2	Strong Girl Bong-soon

=== Special awards ===
Awards	Recipient
**InStyle Fashion Award**	Kim Ha-neul
**Lifetime Achievement Award**	Kim Young-ae
