= W (TV series) =

South Korean television series

- Promotional poster
- Also known as: W: Two Worlds; W: Two Worlds Apart
- Hangul: 더블유
- RR: Deobeuryu
- MR: Tŏbŭryu
- Genre: Fantasy; Romance; Comedy; Thriller; Action
- Written by: Song Jae-jeong
- Directed by: Jung Dae-yoon
- Creative directors: Kim Seul-ah; Kang Hee-ju; Jung Yoo-jin; Jung Jin-chul
- Starring: Lee Jong-suk; Han Hyo-joo
- Music by: Kim Joon-seok; Jeong Se-rin
- Country of origin: South Korea
- Original language: Korean
- No. of episodes: 16

Production
- Executive producer: Son Hyung-suk
- Producers: Oh Min-su; Kim Sang-hun
- Cinematography: Jun Byung-mun; Min Sung-wook
- Editor: Oh Serena
- Running time: 70 minutes
- Production company: Chorokbaem Media

Original release
- Network: MBC TV
- Release: July 20 – September 14, 2016

W (Korean: 더블유) is a 2016 South Korean television series, starring Lee Jong-suk and Han Hyo-joo. Consisting of 16 episodes, it aired on Wednesdays and Thursdays at 22:00 (KST) on MBC from July 20 to September 14, 2016. W centers on the clash between "two worlds": the real world and an alternate universe inside a webtoon, from which the title of the television series was taken.

The series received praise for its unique premise and ranked first in Content Power Index in its premiere week. It achieved respectable ratings of 11.63%, topping viewership ratings in its time slot for its entire run. The series also won numerous accolades at the 35th MBC Drama Awards, notably Drama of the Year, Daesang (Grand Prize) for Lee Jong-suk and Top Excellence awards for both lead actors. Additionally, the chemistry between the leads was well-received and they also won the Best Couple Award that year.

== Plot ==
A romance takes place between Kang Cheol (Lee Jong-suk), who is super rich and exists in the webtoon "W," and Oh Yeon-Joo (Han Hyo-joo) who is a surgeon in the real world.

Oh Seong-moo, the father of cardiothoracic surgeon Oh Yeon-Joo, mysteriously goes missing while writing the last chapter of his webtoon "W". Yeon-Joo goes into his office looking for him, but a hand from his monitor suddenly pulls her in, and she finds herself on the rooftop of a building, next to a bloodied man. She manages to save the person, only to realize that he is Kang Cheol, the main character of her father's webtoon. Yeon-Joo later discovers she can only enter and leave the webtoon depending on Kang Cheol's feelings.

== Cast ==
=== Main ===
- Lee Jong-suk as Kang Cheol

The lead character of the popular comic series W. He is the co-CEO of the e-commerce company JN Global, owner of broadcasting channel W, and an Olympic gold medalist in shooting in his youth. His family was murdered by an elusive murderer, yet Kang Cheol was immediately suspected to be the killer due to his shooting background. After being proven innocent, Kang Cheol seeks vengeance on the murderer through his broadcasting channel W. When he is stabbed on the rooftop of his penthouse by the murderer, he meets Oh Yeon-joo who saves his life and with whom he falls in love.

- Han Hyo-joo as Oh Yeon-joo
  - Hyun Seung-min as teenage Yeon-joo
  - Park Min-ha as child Yeon-joo

A second-year resident cardiothoracic surgeon in Myung-sei Hospital. She is the daughter of the Oh Seong-moo, author and illustrator of the famous webtoon W. A fan of her father's work, she goes to his studio to investigate his sudden disappearance. There, she is pulled into W's alternate universe and meets its protagonist Kang Cheol, with whom she eventually falls in love.

=== Supporting ===
==== Characters from the webtoon W ====
- Kim Eui-sung as Han Sang-hoon

The real killer of Kang Cheol's family. His identity is not revealed until much later, and his face resembles the comic series's author Oh Seong-moo. Before Seong-moo gives him a name and face, he mostly appears as a shadowy, faceless human form.

- Jung Yoo-jin as Yoon So-hee

Kang Cheol's long-time secretary and his friend since they were in high school. Her romantic feelings for Kang Cheol are subtly alluded to throughout the series through her actions and behavior around him, which lead to readers' general expectations of their marriage. Originally intended to be the main female character who would later become Kang Cheol's love interest, she is replaced by Yeon-joo when Kang Cheol falls in love with her.

- Lee Tae-hwan as Seo Do-yoon

Kang Cheol's loyal bodyguard and close friend. Using his knowledge of martial arts, he trained Kang Cheol to fight and is always alongside him in beating bad guys.

- Park Won-sang as Han Cheol-ho

A secondary antagonist of the webtoon. He is a power-hungry prosecutor and a member of Congress who is also the presidential prospect of a new democratic party. To gain political popularity, he becomes the prosecutor in charge of Kang Cheol's case when the latter was accused of his family's murder.

- Cha Kwang-soo as Son Hyun-seok

The director of Project W, a program specializing in criminal investigation, and the general manager of the broadcasting channel W.

==== People around Oh Yeon-joo ====
- Kim Eui-sung as Oh Seong-moo

Yeon-joo's father and a famous artist who created the webtoon W. Once a failed webtoon artist, alcoholic and divorcé, he gains popularity from W. However, he notices that his webtoon and its characters have taken on a reality of their own. As a result, he perceives Kang Cheol as a monster and seeks to eliminate him.

- Lee Si-eon as Park Soo-bong

An apprentice of Seong-moo and confidante of Yeon-joo.

- Nam Gi-ae as Gil Soo-sun

Yeon-joo's mother and Seong-moo's ex-wife.

- Heo Jung-do as Park Min-soo

Cardiothoracic surgeon and Professor at Myung-sei Hospital. He is a passionate fan of W.

- Kang Ki-young as Kang Suk-beom

Second-year resident cardiothoracic surgeon at Myung-sei Hospital and Yeon-joo's friend.

- Lee Se-rang as Gil Soo-young

Yeon-joo's aunt

- Ryu Hye-rin as Sun-mi

Seung-moo's apprentice

- Yang Hye-ji as Yoon-hee

Seung-moo's apprentice

=== Extended ===
- Kim Ik-tae as Assemblyman
- Noh Haeng-ha as Kim Yoo-ri

Nurse at Myung-sei Hospital.

- Ri Min as Team Leader Park
- Seo Gwang-jae
- Yang Seung-geol
- Seol Ji-yoon
- Park Geon-ryool
- Lee Yoon-sang
- Yeo Woon-bok
- Oh Hee-joon as Motel receptionist
- Kang Chan-yang
- Park Sung-taek
- Dong Yoon-seok
- Hwang Yoon-geol
- Kim Kwang-hyun
- Min Joon-ho
- Yoo Pil-ran
- Park Seon-woong
- Jang Moon-seok
- Cheon Ye-won
- Park Geon-rak
- Jo Sung-hee
- Joo Dong-hee

=== Special appearances ===
- Park Choong-seon as Kang Yoon – Cheol's father
- Kim Na-woon as Yoon Mi-ho – Cheol's mother (episode 1)
- Seo Shin-ae as Kang Soo-yeon – Cheol's sister (episode 1)
- Choi Min-young as Kang Joon-seok – Cheol's brother (episode 1)
- Hwang Seok-jeong as Webtoon Writer (episode 6)
- Ahn Se-ha as Kim Poong-ho – Yeon-joo's blind date (episode 6)
- Kim Jung-geun as Anchorman (episodes 1, 4)
- Heo Il-hoo

== Episodes ==
No.	Title	Original release date
1	"Oh Seong Moo has Disappeared!"	July 20, 2016
Oh Yeon-joo learns from her friend and father's assistant, Park Soo-bong (Lee Si-eon) that her father has disappeared while drawing the last issue of W, in which the webtoon's protagonist, Kang Cheol, is supposed to die. The last drawing on his graphics tablet shows Cheol bloodied and unconscious on a roof. As Yeon-joo investigates, she is pulled through the tablet and into the webtoon world. She manages to save Cheol, before noticing the Korean words for "To Be Continued" appear in the air, sending her back. A new episode of W is mysteriously uploaded, which depicts all of Yeon-joo's actions, including a full-page spread of her as a character. She theorizes that the webtoon contains an actual alternate universe. Later, Kang Cheol considers Yeon-joo to be the key to his life.
2	"Find Her, the Key to My Life"	July 21, 2016
Seong-moo turns up again and insists the new issue was his creation. Later, Soo-bong tells Yeon-joo that her father plans to kill Cheol, who is in the hospital. She calls her father, realizing that he too knows the webtoon is alive. She is sucked back into the webtoon, successfully preventing a nurse from administering potassium to Cheol. Two months pass in an instant, and Cheol is now healthy. To get back to the real world, Yeon-joo surprises him with a kiss. Seong-moo, angered that his daughter's adventures had uploaded themselves, dismisses his team to end W in secret. He draws a truck to kill Kang Cheol, but the webtoon rejects this ending, with Cheol surviving.
3	"I Am Someone Who Will Do That"	July 27, 2016
Yeon-joo investigates her father's files and discovers that W started drawing on its own during her father's miserable times. Depressed, he tries to end the webtoon by having Cheol commit suicide, but the drawing changes to Cheol hanging on. Seong-moo is inspired to continue the webtoon until he is famous, but repeated rewrites caused him to think Cheol is a monster. Yeon-joo is dragged back to the webtoon world, where Kang Cheol interrogates her at gunpoint. When she stalls telling the truth, he shoots her, but she doesn't receive a wound, confirming her special nature.
4	"What Is This World Where You Live in?"	July 28, 2016
Yoon So-hee (Jung Yoo-jin), Cheol's personal assistant, sets up an elaborate trap to have Yeon-joo arrested. Cheol demotes So-hee for her actions and visits Yeon-joo in prison. There, she finally reveals to Cheol that he is the main character of a cartoon, returning to the real world afterwards. Now knowing the truth, time in the webtoon stops, and Cheol steps through a portal into the real world.
5	"I've Come Here. To Your World."	August 3, 2016
In the real world, Kang Cheol reads up on W. He visits Yeon-joo at her hospital and kisses her. He then goes to Seong-moo's house, where he learns about his creator's bitter past, which provided the inspiration for his character. Cheol confronts his creator in the flesh, asking the latter to draw his family's killer so he can have a happy ending. When Seong-moo refuses, claiming the murders were just a plot device to make him stronger, Cheol shoots him.
6	"The End"	August 4, 2016
As Seong-moo recovers, Kang Cheol commits suicide, leaving a suicide note with Yeon-joo. His actions get uploaded as the last issue of W, since Seong-moo decides to retire to New Zealand. Soon after, the "the end" mark on the webtoon replaces itself with "To Be Continued." At Yeon-joo's insistence, Soo-bong continues the story, restarting the webtoon world and sending Yeon-joo back to the prison.
7	"Cheol and Yeon-joo Get Married"	August 10, 2016
Kang Cheol meets Yeon-joo and learns his revival was her idea. Distraught over being just a character, he rebukes Yeon-joo for saving him, but changes his mind when she says that she loves him. He kisses Yeon-joo then legally marries her to get her out of prison. Later, his family's murderer calls him and threatens Yeon-joo.
8	"The Killer Is After You"	August 17, 2016
While in Cheol's kitchen, Yeon-joo gets into an accident and bleeds, confirming she is now a character as well. She goes back to the real world, where the murderer, who had also stepped through the portal and learned about the webtoon, pursues her and Soo-bong. She is almost shot but is sent back to Cheol's car. While the murderer teleports to Seong-moo, still en route to New Zealand, Cheol notices So-hee fading away, which he realizes is due to her significance as a character fading. In order to set things right, Cheol sends Yeon-joo back to her world, where she redraws all the previous events as a dream Cheol had.
9	"Make It a Happy Ending"	August 18, 2016
Seong-moo returns to Korea and decides to write a happy ending for W. He plans to give the murderer his face and names him "Han Sang-hoon." After the latter is caught, Prosecutor Han Cheol-ho (Park Won-sang)—who wished to gain political power by presiding over Cheol's case, believing him to be the one who killed his family—was supposed to kill Sang-hoon. However, while Seong-moo works on the ending, Yeon-joo is suddenly sent back to the webtoon world to help treat the victims of a mass shooting at a TV station. The perpetrator was no other than Sang-hoon, who grabbed Seong-moo's face and made it his own. She meets Kang Cheol, who no longer recognizes her.
10	"The World Controlled By The Killer"	August 24, 2016
Sang-hoon uses the faceless Seong-moo as his robotic alter ego, using the latter to manipulate the webtoon world to his liking. He conspires with Cheol-ho to frame Kang Cheol for the murder of his producer, Son Hyun-suk. (Cha Kwang-soo) He escapes, but he is shot by the police. Yeon-joo takes him to a hotel so he can recover, then kisses him so she can return to her world.
11	"What Happens Next?"	August 25, 2016
Yeon-joo discovers her faceless father and uses his tablet to help Kang Cheol treat himself and evade the police. She is suddenly summoned to Cheol-ho's office, arousing his suspicion, then goes to Cheol's penthouse. Everyone thinks Cheol is dead, except for his bodyguard Seo Do-yoon (Lee Tae-hwan), who knows the former's location. Kang Cheol starts imitating his past self, which, as Yeon-joo discovers, is due to him having read a copy of W that was accidentally brought to his world. He finally makes the connection between the webtoon's character and himself.
12	"Cheol's Second Awakening"	August 31, 2016
Cheol and Yeon-joo step back into the real world, where they restart their relationship. Cheol breaks Seong-moo's tablet to prevent Sang-hoon from interfering with the real world, but later repairs it so that Sang-hoon will be captured and Cheol-ho investigated for his crimes, as he originally planned. He also learns he can travel between the webtoon world and the real world at will.
13	"For the Last Episode of W"	September 1, 2016
Cheol learns he can summon characters from W into the real world. He accidentally summons Sang-hoon, who orders Seong-moo to destroy his tablet and brings Yeon-joo to the webtoon world to trap Cheol. He successfully locates Sang-hoon's hideout and kills him, but Yeon-joo has been shot. She and Cheol return to the real world, the former as a lifeless body.
14	"Secret of the Tablet"	September 7, 2016
Han Cheol-ho finds a copy of Seong-moo's graphics tablet in Sang-hoon's car. Kang Cheol brings Yeon-joo to the webtoon world to recover but she dies. Seong-moo grieves over the fact that he cannot draw his daughter back to life, so Cheol goes to the webtoon world to retrieve the copy. He is caught by Cheol-ho, who had discovered that the tablet can bring any drawing to life when the Enter key is pressed on a connected computer, and can erase things by pressing Delete (as in the Mac equivalent to Backspace). Despite being tortured, Cheol lures Cheol-ho to Seong-moo's location to deliver the tablet to him. After Yeon-joo is brought back to life, she is brought back to the webtoon world, where the words "Final Chapter" appear in front of her.
15	"Which Kind of Ending Will It Be?"	September 8, 2016
In the webtoon's last issue, a year has passed since it left off; Kang Cheol is sentenced to death but he escapes, thanks to Seong-moo who was also dragged inside. Cheol learns that Seong-moo has been a mental patient due to his adopting Sang-hoon's villainous personality and will cease to exist if he does not do evil. With the police about to arrest Seong-moo and Do-yoon kidnapped, Cheol and Yeon-joo realize that Yeon-joo will lose either Cheol or her father. To end the webtoon in the safest way possible, Yeon-joo draws security footage of Cheol-ho's torture.
16	"After W Ends"	September 14, 2016
Kang Cheol saves Do-yoon but is shot by Cheol-ho. He manages to reach a bus stop where he calls Yeon-joo to save him, but he collapses. Yeon-joo is sent back to the real world. Seong-moo, now staying at a motel, forces Cheol-ho to commit suicide and exposes him to the authorities. He arrives just in time to see Yeon-joo at a bus stop before disappearing forever. Cheol spends two years in prison before somehow sending himself back to the real world, where he meets Yeon-joo in a hospital. They then continue their romance away from the dangers of the webtoon.

== Production ==
The series is helmed by director Jung Dae-yoon, who directed She Was Pretty, and writer Song Jae-jung, whose previous works include Nine: Nine Time Travels and Queen and I.

The first script reading of the drama was held in May 2016.

The drama is Han Hyo-joo's small screen comeback after six years.

== Original soundtrack ==
W : Original Soundtrack

Soundtrack album by Various Artists
- Released: 2016
- Genres: Pop, K-pop, soundtrack
- Labels: Sebunguri/Star&Tree/LOEN; L200001314
- Producers: Son Nak-hee, Kim Young-ho (both executive)

=== Part 1 ===
No.	Title	Lyrics	Music	Artist	Length
1.	"Where Are U" (내가 너에게 가던 네가 나에게 오던)	Seo Dong-sung	Park Sung-il (Copykumo)	Jung Joon-young	4:19
2.	"Where Are U" (Inst.)		Park Sung-il (Copykumo)		4:19
Total length:					8:38

=== Part 2 ===
No.	Title	Lyrics	Music	Artist	Length
1.	"Please Say Something, Even Though It Is a Lie" (거짓말이라도 해줘요)	Red Socks, Choi Jae-woo	Red Socks	Park Bo-ram	3:33
2.	"Please Say Something, Even Though It Is a Lie" (Inst.)		Red Socks		3:33
Total length:					7:06

=== Part 3 ===
No.	Title	Lyrics	Music	Artist	Length
1.	"In the Illusion" (환상 속의 그대)	Leah Min-young Park (Hwayobi), Lee Cheol-joo (Basick)	Park Sung-il (Copykumo)	Basick & Inkii	4:09
2.	"In the Illusion" (Inst.)		Park Sung-il (Copykumo)		4:09
Total length:					8:18

=== Part 4 ===
No.	Title	Lyrics	Music	Artist	Length
1.	"Remember" (기억)	5ily, Choi Kang	5ily	KCM	4:13
2.	"Remember" (Inst.)		5ily		4:13
Total length:					8:26

=== Part 5 ===
No.	Title	Lyrics	Music	Artist	Length
1.	"Falling"	Han Joon, Benjamin K	Lee Yoo-jin	Jo Hyun-ah (Urban Zakapa)	3:21
2.	"Falling" (Inst.)		Lee Yoo-jin		3:21
Total length:					6:42

=== Part 6 ===
No.	Title	Lyrics	Music	Artist	Length
1.	"My Heart" (내 맘)	Cadence, Seo Jae-ha, Kim Young-sung	Cadence, Seo Jae-ha, Kim Young-sung	Jeon Woo-sung (Noel)	3:52
2.	"My Heart" (Inst.)		Cadence, Seo Jae-ha, Kim Young-sung		3:52
Total length:					7:44

=== Part 7 ===
No.	Title	Lyrics	Music	Artist	Length
1.	"You And I" (그대와 나)	Shoulder Bully (어깨깡패)	Shoulder Bully (어깨깡패)	Ahn Hyun-jeong	3:45
2.	"You And I" (Inst.)		Shoulder Bully (어깨깡패)		3:45
Total length:					7:30

=== Part 8 ===
No.	Title	Lyrics	Music	Artist	Length
1.	"Draw a Love" (사랑을 그려요)	Han Joon, Benjamin K	Tom & Jerry	Navi	3:59
2.	"Draw a Love" (Inst.)		Tom & Jerry		3:59
Total length:					7:58

=== Part 9 ===
No.	Title	Lyrics	Music	Artist	Length
1.	"Without You" (니가 없는 난)	Red Socks	Red Socks	N (VIXX) & Yeoeun (Melody Day)	4:34
2.	"Without You" (Inst.)		Red Socks		4:34
Total length:					9:08

Disc 2:
No.	Title	Artist	Length
1.	"Title of W" (Opening Title)	Various Artists	0:44
2.	"A New Variable"	Various Artists	1:17
3.	"Black Shadow"	Various Artists	2:44
4.	"Collapsed Dimensions"	Various Artists	4:00
5.	"Crazy Dog, Professor Park"	Various Artists	2:03
6.	"Forgotten Memory"	Various Artists	2:02
7.	"Falsified Incident"	Various Artists	2:04
8.	"Hidden Content"	Various Artists	3:27
9.	"I want to erase sadness"	Various Artists	3:38
10.	"I Love you"	Various Artists	1:59
11.	"I've changed the heroine"	Various Artists	2:17
12.	"It is your setting"	Various Artists	2:38
13.	"Instead of being eaten, I will be eating"	Various Artists	2:27
14.	"Key to my life"	Various Artists	3:23
15.	"Like normal couples"	Various Artists	3:02
16.	"Lost Time"	Various Artists	2:38
17.	"Moment of Decision"	Various Artists	3:08
18.	"Meaning of ring"	Various Artists	4:19
19.	"No Dark Entity"	Various Artists	4:51
20.	"Non-existent Existence"	Various Artists	1:56
21.	"Nice to meet you Kang Chul fan!"	Various Artists	2:22
22.	"Ordinary Happiness"	Various Artists	2:42
23.	"Reason of Existence"	Lee Yun Ji	2:10
24.	"Real Criminal's Face"	Various Artists	2:33
25.	"Sour Charm"	Various Artists	2:38
26.	"Today's Homework"	Various Artists	2:14
27.	"Two worlds, One heart"	Various Artists	3:13
28.	"10 years of waiting"	Various Artists	2:35
29.	"To be continued"	Various Artists	3:46
30.	"Twisted Fact"	Various Artists	2:07
31.	"The strongest type of abnormal"	Various Artists	2:07
32.	"Win a losing game"	Various Artists	2:14
33.	"When I feel I'm into you"	Various Artists	2:59
34.	"Wish to happy ending"	Various Artists	3:22
35.	"Why did you look at me like this?"	Various Artists	2:22
36.	"W (Main Theme)"	Various Artists	3:57
37.	"Wealthy young man, Kang Chul"	Various Artists	2:35
38.	"World within webtoon"	Various Artists	2:26

==== Charted songs ====
Chart Performance

Title	Year	Peak chart positions	Sales	Remarks
Title	Year	KOR Gaon	Sales	Remarks
"Where Are U" (Jung Joon-young)	2016	67	KOR: 121,780+	Part 1
"Please Say Something Even Though It Is A Lie" (Park Bo-ram)	2016	30	KOR: 214,865+	Part 2
"Falling" (Jo Hyun-ah (Urban Zakapa))	2016	60	KOR: 60,637+	Part 5
"Without You" (N (VIXX) & Yeoeun (Melody Day))	2016	98	KOR: 26,260+	Part 9

=== Album charts ===
Chart (2016)	Peak position
South Korea (Gaon Album Chart)	16
Taiwan (FIVE-MUSIC Album Chart)	17

== Ratings ==
Ep.	Original broadcast date	Average audience share			
Ep.	Original broadcast date	Nielsen Korea		TNmS	
Ep.	Original broadcast date	Nationwide	Seoul	Nationwide	Seoul
1	July 20, 2016	8.6% (17th)	10.4% (10th)	9.9% (10th)	11.3% (7th)
2	July 21, 2016	9.5% (12th)	10.7% (10th)	10.1% (9th)	11.5% (5th)
3	July 27, 2016	12.9% (4th)	15.0% (4th)	11.6% (7th)	13.7% (4th)
4	July 28, 2016	12.9% (4th)	14.3% (4th)	13.4% (5th)	14.7% (4th)
5	August 3, 2016	13.5% (3rd)	14.3% (3rd)	15.1% (3rd)	17.8% (1st)
6	August 4, 2016	12.2% (4th)	12.2% (4th)	14.2% (5th)	15.9% (2nd)
7	August 10, 2016	13.8% (4th)	14.7% (3rd)	15.2% (4th)	17.3% (2nd)
8	August 17, 2016 (Note: Episode 8 didn't air on August 11 due to broadcast of the 2016 Summer Olympics in Rio de Janeiro, Brazil. This episode aired on August 17, 2016.)	12.2% (5th)	13.3% (4th)	13.5% (5th)	15.0% (4th)
9	August 18, 2016	11.3% (7th)	12.5% (5th)	12.7% (4th)	14.7% (3rd)
10	August 24, 2016	12.3% (6th)	13.7% (4th)	13.9% (5th)	15.3% (3rd)
11	August 25, 2016	12.2% (6th)	12.8% (5th)	14.6% (6th)	15.8% (5th)
12	August 31, 2016	11.1% (7th)	12.0% (5th)	13.3% (6th)	15.1% (5th)
13	September 1, 2016	11.9% (5th)	13.2% (5th)	12.9% (6th)	15.0% (3rd)
14	September 7, 2016	10.9% (5th)	11.8% (4th)	13.1% (5th)	15.3% (3rd)
15	September 8, 2016	11.4% (6th)	12.3% (4th)	11.8% (6th)	14.1% (4th)
16	September 14, 2016	9.3% (7th)	9.8% (6th)	10.6% (4th)	10.9% (4th)
Average		11.6%	12.7%	12.9%	14.6%
In the table above, the blue numbers represent the lowest ratings and the red numbers represent the highest ratings.

== Other adaptations ==
A Thai remake of the drama, Switch On was aired on Channel 3 on November 19, 2021. The adaptation changes the setting of the alternate universe from a webtoon to a virtual reality video game.

An American adaptation, titled Angel City was in development at The CW. The project will be produced by CBS Studios with Craig Plestis as executive producer.

A Malaysian remake of the drama, which also titled W: Two Worlds premiered in November 2023 on Viu and aired its final episode in early January 2024.

A Chinese remake of the drama titled "The Next stop W" started streaming in 2023. Available on WeTV, it is a shortened version of the drama set in Guangzhou.

== Awards and nominations ==
Year	Award	Category	Recipient	Result	Ref.
2016	5th APAN Star Awards	Top Excellence Award, Actor in a Miniseries	Lee Jong-suk	Nominated	
2016	5th APAN Star Awards	Top Excellence Award, Actress in a Miniseries	Han Hyo-joo	Won	
2016	5th APAN Star Awards	Best Supporting Actor	Kim Eui-sung	Won	
2016	5th APAN Star Awards	Best Couple Award	Lee Jong-suk and Han Hyo-joo	Nominated	
2016	1st Asia Artist Awards	Best Artist Award, actor	Lee Jong-suk	Nominated	
2016	1st Asia Artist Awards	Best Artist Award, actress	Han Hyo-joo	Nominated	
2016	35th MBC Drama Awards	Drama of the Year	W	Won	
2016	35th MBC Drama Awards	Grand Prize / Daesang (Determined through fan votes)	Lee Jong-suk	Won	
2016	35th MBC Drama Awards	Grand Prize / Daesang (Determined through fan votes)	Han Hyo-joo	Nominated	
2016	35th MBC Drama Awards	Top Excellence Award, Actor in a Miniseries	Lee Jong-suk	Won	
2016	35th MBC Drama Awards	Top Excellence Award, Actress in a Miniseries	Han Hyo-joo	Won	
2016	35th MBC Drama Awards	Golden Acting Award, Actor in a Miniseries	Kim Eui-sung	Won	
2016	35th MBC Drama Awards	Writer of the Year	Song Jae-jung	Won	
2016	35th MBC Drama Awards	Best New Actor	Lee Si-eon	Nominated	
2016	35th MBC Drama Awards	Best New Actor	Lee Tae-hwan	Nominated	
2016	35th MBC Drama Awards	Best New Actress	Jung Yoo-jin	Nominated	
2016	35th MBC Drama Awards	Best Couple Award	Lee Jong-suk and Han Hyo-joo	Won	
2016	35th MBC Drama Awards	Best Couple Award	Kim Eui-sung and Lee Si-eon	Nominated	
2016	Korea Content Awards	Prime Minister Commendation	Song Jae-jung	Won	
2017	Korea Communications Commission Broadcasting Awards	Korean Wave Program Excellence Prize	W	Won	
2017	50th WorldFest Houston International Film Festival	Special Jury Award	W	Won	
2017	53rd Baeksang Arts Awards	Best Drama	W	Nominated	
2017	53rd Baeksang Arts Awards	Best Director	Jung Dae-yoon	Nominated	
2017	53rd Baeksang Arts Awards	Best Screenplay	Song Jae-jung	Nominated	
2017	Seoul International Drama Awards	Outstanding Korean Drama	W	Won	
