= 2016 MBC Drama Awards =

35th edition of award ceremony

- Date: December 30, 2016
- Site: MBC Media Center Public Hall, Sangam-dong, Mapo-gu, Seoul
- Hosted by: Main: Kim Gook-jin; Uee; Special MC: Hwang Je-sung; Park Seul-gi

Highlights
- Best Drama Serial: W
- Grand Prize (Daesang): Lee Jong-suk

Television coverage
- Network: MBC
- Duration: 160 minutes

The 2016 MBC Drama Awards (Korean: MBC 연기대상; RR: MBC Yeon-gi Daesang), presented by Munhwa Broadcasting Corporation (MBC) took place on December 30, 2016. It was hosted by Kim Gook-jin and Uee.

== Winners and nominees ==
- Winners denoted in **bold**
- The Grand Prize (Daesang) has been determined through viewer's votes since 2014, and not by a professional set of judges.

Grand Prize (Daesang)	Drama of the Year
**Lee Jong-suk** – **W**; Han Hyo-joo – W; Jin Se-yeon – Flowers of the Prison; Kim So-yeon – Happy Home; Lee Seo-jin – Marriage Contract; Seo In-guk – Shopping King Louie; Uee – Marriage Contract	**W**; Flowers of the Prison; Happy Home; Marriage Contract; Shopping King Louie
Top Excellence Award, Actor in a Miniseries	Top Excellence Award, Actress in a Miniseries
**Lee Jong-suk** – **W**; Jung Kyung-ho – One More Happy Ending; Kim Kang-woo – Goodbye Mr. Black; Ryu Jun-yeol – Lucky Romance	**Han Hyo-joo** – **W**; Hwang Jung-eum – Lucky Romance; Jang Na-ra – One More Happy Ending; Moon Chae-won – Goodbye Mr. Black
Top Excellence Award, Actor in a Special Project Drama	Top Excellence Award, Actress in a Special Project Drama
**Lee Seo-jin** – **Marriage Contract**; Go Soo – Flowers of the Prison; Joo Jin-mo – Woman with a Suitcase; Kang Ji-hwan – Monster	**Uee** – **Marriage Contract**; Choi Ji-woo – Woman with a Suitcase; Kim Mi-sook – Flowers of the Prison; Sung Yu-ri – Monster
Top Excellence Award, Actor in a Serial Drama	Top Excellence Award, Actress in a Serial Drama
**Lee Sang-woo** – **Happy Home**; Kim Yeong-cheol – Happy Home; Park Gun-hyung – Working Mom Parenting Daddy; Jeon No-min – Start Again	**Kim So-yeon** – **Happy Home**; Hong Eun-hee – Working Mom Parenting Daddy; Lee So-yeon – Beautiful You; Won Mi-kyung – Happy Home
Excellence Award, Actor in a Miniseries	Excellence Award, Actress in a Miniseries
**Seo In-guk** – **Shopping King Louie**; Kwon Yul – One More Happy Ending; Lee Jae-yoon – Weightlifting Fairy Kim Bok-joo; Nam Joo-hyuk – Weightlifting Fairy Kim Bok-joo; Yoon Sang-hyun – Shopping King Louie	**Lee Sung-kyung** – **Weightlifting Fairy Kim Bok-joo**; Kyung Soo-jin – Weightlifting Fairy Kim Bok-joo; Lee Chung-ah – Lucky Romance; Nam Ji-hyun – Shopping King Louie; Yoo In-young – Goodbye Mr. Black
Excellence Award, Actor in a Special Project Drama	Excellence Award, Actress in a Special Project Drama
**Seo Ha-joon** – **Flowers of the Prison**; Choi Tae-joon – Flowers of the Prison; Lee Joon – Woman with a Suitcase; Park Ki-woong – Monster	**Jin Se-yeon** – **Flowers of the Prison**; Jeon Hye-bin – Woman with a Suitcase; Jo Bo-ah – Monster; Kim Yoo-ri – Marriage Contract
Excellence Award, Actor in a Serial Drama	Excellence Award, Actress in a Serial Drama
**Son Ho-jun** – **Blow Breeze**; Han Joo-wan – Blow Breeze; Kim Jeong-hoon – Start Again; Song Won-geun – Tomorrow Victory	**Lim Ji-yeon** – **Blow Breeze**; Jeon So-min – Tomorrow Victory; Kang Min-kyung – The Dearest Lady; Woo Hee-jin – Good Person
Golden Acting Award, Actor in a Miniseries	Golden Acting Award, Actress in a Miniseries
**Kim Eui-sung** – **W**; Ahn Gil-kang – Weightlifting Fairy Kim Bok-joo; Kim Kyu-chul – Shopping King Louie; Um Hyo-sup – Shopping King Louie	**Im Se-mi** – **Shopping King Louie**; Jang Young-nam – Weightlifting Fairy Kim Bok-joo; Kim Sun-young – Shopping King Louie; Yoo Da-in – One More Happy Ending
Golden Acting Award, Actor in a Special Project Drama	Golden Acting Award, Actress in a Special Project Drama
**Jung Joon-ho** – **Flowers of the Prison**; Jang Hyun-sung – Woman with a Suitcase; Jeong Bo-seok – Monster; Jin Tae-hyun – Monster	**Lee Hwi-hyang** – **Marriage Contract**; Kim Bo-yeon – Monster; Lee El – Monster; Jin Kyung – Woman with a Suitcase
Golden Acting Award, Actor in a Serial Drama	Golden Acting Award, Actress in a Serial Drama
**Lee Pil-mo** – **Happy Home**; Byun Hee-bong – Blow Breeze; Choi Phillip – Tomorrow Victory; Han Ji-sang – Working Mom Parenting Daddy	**Kim Ji-ho** – **Happy Home**; Byun Jung-soo – The Dearest Lady; Im Soo-hyang – Blow Breeze; Seo Yi-sook – Happy Home
Best New Actor	Best New Actress
**Nam Joo-hyuk** – **Weightlifting Fairy Kim Bok-joo**; **Ryu Jun-yeol** – **Lucky Romance**; Ahn Hyo-seop – Happy Home; Jang In-sub – Happy Home; Lee Si-eon – W; Lee Tae-hwan – W; Park Sun-ho – Start Again	**Jo Bo-ah** – **Monster**; **Nam Ji-hyun** – **Shopping King Louie**; Choi Yoon-so – Happy Home; Jung Yoo-jin – W; Lee Yul-eum – Monster; Oh Jung-yeon – Working Mom Parenting Daddy; Park Min-ji – Start Again
Writer of the Year	Best Voice Actor
**Song Jae-jeong** – **W**	**Choi Soo-jin**
Best Young Actor/Actress	Best Couple Award
**Goo Geon-min** – **Working Mom Parenting Daddy**; **Jung Da-bin** – **Flowers of the Prison**; Lee Na-yoon – Happy Home; Lee Young-eun – Blow Breeze; Shin Rin-ah – Marriage Contract; Yoon Chan-young – Blow Breeze	**Lee Jong-suk** and **Han Hyo-joo** – **W**; Kim Eui-sung and Lee Si-eon – W; Lee Sang-woo and Kim So-yeon – Happy Home; Lee Seo-jin and Uee – Marriage Contract; Lee Pil-mo and Kim So-yeon – Happy Home; Nam Joo-hyuk and Lee Sung-kyung – Weightlifting Fairy Kim Bok-joo; Seo Ha-joon and Jin Se-yeon – Flowers of the Prison; Seo In-guk and Nam Ji-hyun – Shopping King Louie

== Presenters ==
Order	Presenter	Award	Ref.
1	Yoon Hyun-min, Kyung Soo-jin	Best New Actor/Actress	
2	Yang Han-yeol, Kal So-won	Best Young Actor/Actress	
3	Lee Si-eon, Go Woo-ri	Best Couple Award	
4	Nam Joo-hyuk, Lee Sung-kyung	Golden Acting Award, Actor/Actress in a Special Project Drama	
5	Kim Ho-jin, Oh Hyun-kyung	Golden Acting Award, Actor/Actress in a Serial Drama	
6	Seo In-guk, Hwang Seok-jeong	Golden Acting Award, Actor/Actress in a Miniseries	
7	Choi Tae-joon, Jung Da-bin	Excellence Award, Actor/Actress in a Special Project Drama	
8	Jung Kyung-ho, Baek Jin-hee	Excellence Award, Actor/Actress in a Serial Drama	
9	Jinyoung & Baro (B1A4)	Excellence Award, Actor/Actress in a Miniseries	
10	Jung Jin-young, Jin Se-yeon	Top Excellence Award, Actor/Actress in a Special Project Drama	
11	Song Chang-eui, Lee El	Top Excellence Award, Actor/Actress in a Serial Drama	
12	Siwan (ZE:A), Yoona (Girls' Generation)	Top Excellence Award, Actor/Actress in a Miniseries	
13	Yoo Seung-ho, Kim So-hyun	Drama of the Year	
14	Kwon Jae-hong, Ji Sung	Grand Prize (Daesang)	

== Special performances ==
Order	Artist	Song	Ref.
1	Twice	"TT"	
2	B1A4	"A Lie" (거짓말이야)	
