= Song Jae-jeong =

South Korean television screenwriter

- 송재정
- Born: November 28, 1973 (age 52); Daejeon, South Korea
- Other name: Myeongryang Woo (Bright Cow)
- Education: Bachelor's degree in Journalism and Broadcasting, Ewha Womans University; Master's degree from Yonsei University Graduate School of Journalism and Public Relations
- Occupation: Screenwriter
- Years active: 1996–present
- Employer: Merrycow Creative
- Organization: Korea Television and Radio Writers Association (KTRWA)
- Notable work: Nine; W: Two Worlds Apart; Memories of the Alhambra; Yumi's Cells
- Honours: Commendation from the Minister of Culture, Sports and Tourism

Korean name
- Hangul: 송재정
- RR: Song Jaejeong
- MR: Song Chaejŏng

Song Jae-jeong (Korean: 송재정; born on November 28, 1973) is a South Korean film television screenwriter. Song is best known for her dramas, Nine, W: Two Worlds Apart, Memories of the Alhambra, and Yumi's Cells.

Song has been recognized with several prestigious awards, including the 4th KIPA Awards Writer's Award, the 20th Korea Broadcast Writer's Award (Entertainment), and the Korea Content Awards Minister of Culture, Sports and Tourism's Commendation in 2013 and 2016. Additionally, she was honored with the Writer of the Year Award at the MBC Drama Awards.

== Early life ==
Song Jae-jeong was born in Daejeon on November 28, 1973. Raised in a bustling restaurant environment, she found solace in solitude and cultivated a love for comic books, mystery novels, and gaming. With aspirations of becoming a journalist, she enrolled in the Department of Journalism and Broadcasting at Ewha Womans University in 1992.

She majored in journalism, but she had hardly ever written anything until that point, so she never dreamed of becoming a writer. Her true aspiration was to become a journalist. However, she did not study enough, and her grades were poor that she could not even take the employment exams.

Thinking she had to work at a broadcasting station due to her major, she realized that becoming a writer was a way to get in without considering school grades or exams. So, she enrolled in the Broadcasting Academy. For an assignment, she submitted a sketch comedy. The comedy instructor praised her talent, to which she responded in disbelief, "Me? I've never made anyone laugh before!" Even her family doubted it, "How could a kid who always sits alone and never talks have a knack for comedy?" But since she was told she had a talent, she joined a production company as a broadcast writer.

== Career ==
=== Early career ===
Song began her career as a cultural programs writer in 1996, choosing not to pursue a career as a drama writer because of the high intellectual demands. She also believed she did not have the talent to be an entertainment writer. However, a comedy writer at a broadcasting station noticed her potential. Song was then recruited by Yoo Seong-chan, a key figure in SBS TV's entertainment department. She started her career as an entertainment writer on SBS TV comedy show Laughter High School, and went on to work on other shows such as I Love Comedy, Game of Life, Lee Moon-se's Live, and Game Show High Five. While working on the sitcom Dad is the Boss, Song found that sitcom writing was a perfect fit for her.

In 1997, Kim Byung-wook who was at the same production company, asked her to join a new SBS TV sitcom called Miss and Mister due to a shortage of staff. She attended a meeting and found it enjoyable, but the program ended abruptly before she could learn much. In 1998, there was talk within the broadcasting station about planning the sitcom Soonpoong Clinic. Song dropped everything she was doing and joined the team. She learned writing techniques of comedy, romance, and more through sitcoms. Initially, Soonpoong Clinic had difficulty attracting attention, only securing one advertisement. However, as the show's characters and episodes evolved, its popularity surged and exploded within a year.

"The response to Soonpoong was truly explosive. Not only did Oh Ji-myeong, who was already considered the 'Midas hand of sitcoms' with General Oh, become a star, but Sunwoo Yong-yeo, Park Young-gyu, Song Hye-kyo, and even the child actress who played Mi-dal also became stars. Thanks to that, I also became famous."

Soonpoong Clinic was a pivotal moment in Song's life, as it established her reputation as the top sitcom writer. She believes that Soonpoong set the standard for Korean sitcoms, with its natural humor, unexpected twists, and heartfelt family stories. Song also cherishes her time working on Soonpoong because it brought her together with directors Kim Byung-wook, Kim Young-ki, and other writers, creating a strong sitcom team that lasted for a decade. She reflects on the challenges of creating instant laughter in a sitcom, emphasizing the importance of quick wit and comedic timing.

The success of Soonpoong Clinic led to further collaborations with director Kim Byung-wook. The two were evaluated as having established the prototype of Korean sitcoms by successively releasing hit sitcoms like Why Can't We Stop Them (2001–2002), Honest Living (2002–2003), and Cute or Crazy (2005). Together, they were recognized as a duo of sitcom geniuses in the broadcasting industry. Their next sitcom, High Kick! was highly anticipated as a standout work from the start.

During the production of High Kick!, the staff had unique nicknames, with Song being referred to as "Bright Cow" due to her email ID being "Merry Cow." The project plan was developed in May, and the writers came together in July to work on High Kick!. They conducted brainstorming sessions to generate ideas, and once they had a rough draft, Song refined it into a solid script. The team consisted of five writers and two assistant writers. Song believed that involving more people in a comedy project could enhance the creative process. To prevent sitcoms from becoming stale, she incorporated elements of romance, mystery, and detective work into High Kick!.

In 2008, Song left family stories and sets behind, and delved into mystery, while still maintaining the strength of clear characters and sharp detailed descriptions. When discussing The Secret of Coocoo Island, she remarked, "If I were stranded on an island, I would also have fun playing Samchigi." Drawing inspiration from childhood favorites such as Treasure Island and Future Boy Conan, as well as the American drama Lost, she embarked on a new format with The Secret of Coocoo Island. Crafting a concise 40-episode story, she aimed to explore the potential of a season-based format.

"When I was writing it, it was fun. After finishing Why Can't We Stop Them, I thought it would be difficult to do a family sitcom anymore, so I explored various options. Cute or Crazy didn't have much family in it, and I even thought about quitting sitcoms. However, the broadcasting company wanted a family sitcom, so thanks to the positive response to High Kick! I was able to attempt something like The Secret of Coocoo Island. But really, I felt liberated because I didn't have to include family in it."

In 2009, amidst her busy life as a writer, she successfully completed her master's thesis on "research on the co-writing system." This achievement inspired her to focus on creating dramas that authentically depict workplace stories, expressing her desire to tackle real-life issues rather than the typical chaebol narratives commonly seen in dramas. Song and director Pyo Min-soo started a new drama project initially titled Page One (페이지원). The project later became Coffee House, starring Kang Ji-hwan, Park Si-yeon, Hahm Eun-jung, and Jung Woong-in, aired on SBS from May 17 to July 27, 2010, with 18 episodes broadcast on Mondays and Tuesdays. Coffee House gained popularity on the Chinese video streaming platform Youku, with over 10,000,000 views and an average of 500,000 views per episode as of November 2015.

=== Time-traveling trilogy and fusion-historical drama ===
In 2012, Song Jae-jeong began exploring time-traveling themes with mini-series Queen and I, directed by Kim Byung-soo, kicking off her trilogy of time-traveling dramas. The plot revolves around Choi Hee-jin, an unknown actress (portrayed by Yoo In-na in her debut leading role), who falls in love with Kim Bung-do (played by Ji Hyun-woo), a time-traveling scholar from the Joseon period (1392–1910) who travels 300 years into the future to the 21st century. The show aired on cable channel tvN from April 18 to June 7, 2012, airing on Wednesdays and Thursdays for a total of 16 episodes.

In 2013, Song's second work of the trilogy was the tvN drama Nine: Nine Time Travels. She began working on the synopsis in 2010, but it took a while to put it all together. Nine is a unique story about time travel and scent. Unlike traditional time slip stories that focus on changing the past or protecting first love, Nine shifts the narrative to protecting the present instead. The main character, anchorman Park Seon-woo (played by Lee Jin-wook), discovers a time machine that can take him back 20 years. In the 18th episode, he uses 9 incense sticks to try to save his older brother Jeong-woo (played by Jeon No-min), who died in the Himalayas, and himself, as he has been diagnosed with a terminal brain tumor.

In 2014, Song released her first fusion-historical drama, The Three Musketeers, loosely based on Alexandre Dumas's 1844 novel The Three Musketeers. The series follows three Joseon-era adventurers serving Crown Prince Sohyeon as warrior guards. It features Jung Yong-hwa, Lee Jin-wook, Yang Dong-geun, Jung Hae-in, and Seo Hyun-jin. Aired on tvN from August to November 2014, the show had 12 episodes. Originally planned for three seasons with a budget of US$10 million, low viewership ratings led to indefinite postponement of succeeding seasons.

In 2016, Song released W: Two Worlds Apart. It aired 16 episodes on MBC from July 20 to September 14, 2016, on Wednesdays and Thursdays. W centers on the clash between the real world and a webtoon's alternate universe, revolving around the romance between webtoon character Kang Cheol (Lee Jong-suk) and real-world surgeon Oh Yeon-joo (Han Hyo-joo). The drama W was influenced by Francisco Goya's painting Saturn Eating His Son, which Song saw at an art museum in Spain in 2015. According to Song, the letter W has two meanings. First, it represents "who" and "why," referring to the mystery surrounding the murder of Cheol's family. Second, it stands for "Wonder World," depicting the fantastical and sometimes dark world seen through Yeon-joo's eyes in webtoon.

It received praise for its unique concept and ranked first in Content Power Index in its premiere week. It achieved ratings of 11.63%, topping viewership ratings in its time slot for its entire run. W is the last installment in Song Jae-jung's trilogy of time-traveling dramas. Song said, "The reason I transitioned to dramas was because I wanted to try something strange and unique that couldn't be expressed in sitcoms. To make ordinary people experience car chases or dramatic disappearances, there's no genre quite like time-traveling." The success of W elevated Song to the level of renowned writers like Kim Eun-sook and Kim Eun-hee. In December of the same year Song established writers's company Merrycow Creative (Korean: 주식회사 메리카우) with Song Jae-kwon.

=== Projects with Merrycow Creative ===
In 2018, Song released Memories of the Alhambra, Korea's first augmented reality-gaming drama. Primarily set in Spain (and in South Korea in later episodes), the series centers on a company CEO Yoo Jin-woo (Hyun Bin), and a hostel owner Jung Hee-joo (Park Shin-hye), who get entangled in a series of mysterious incidents surrounding a new and intricate augmented reality game inspired by the stories of the Alhambra Palace.

The series was revealed to be inspired by tech mogul Elon Musk and game Pokémon Go. It was praised for its creative plot and its unexpected twists, achieving a peak viewership of 10 percent, as reported by Nielsen Korea. The drama is one of the highest-rated Korean dramas in cable television history. Its title also alludes to Francisco Tárrega's classical guitar piece Recuerdos de la Alhambra, which is also a part of the series' soundtrack. It aired on cable network tvN from December 1, 2018, to January 20, 2019, every Saturday and Sunday. It is also available for online streaming on Netflix.

On December 18, 2019, Studio Dragon, the drama production subsidiary of CJ ENM, announced the acquisition of a 19% stake in Merrycow Creative, making it an affiliate partner company of Studio Dragon along with Movie Rock and Next Scene.

Song initially proposed the idea for Yumi's Cells to Studio Dragon. After completing Memories of the Alhambra, she took a break and went on a trip. While searching for something to watch on the plane, Song expressed her desire for a heartwarming story, contrasting with the desolate tone of Alhambra. Her friends recommended a few webtoons, including Yumi's Cells, which immediately captured her interest. Recognizing the abundance of talented junior writers skilled in romance storytelling, Song opted to entrust the script to them while actively participating as a creator.

On December 31, 2020, it was announced that the popular webtoon Yumi's Cells by Lee Dong-gun, with 3.2 billion views on Naver, would be adapted into a TV series. Kim Go-eun was confirmed as the female lead. It is a cell-based psychological romance that unravels the daily life of an ordinary office worker Yumi through the eyes of the cells in her head. Filming of the series started in April 2021, the main cast was revealed to include Kim Go-eun, Ahn Bo-hyun, Lee Yu-bi, and Park Ji-hyun. The show is using a unique format that blends live-action and 3D animation, a first for Korean dramas, while using the Unreal Engine as its source. The 3D animation was created by Locus Corporation (also known as Sidus Animation Studios), the producer of Red Shoes and the Seven Dwarfs, and they are also working on an animated film based on the same property with Studio N.

In season 2, Song played the role of creator, with the script written by Kim Yoon-ju and Kim Gyeong-ran. The series was directed by Lee Sang-yeop, and Park Jin-young joined the cast as Yoo Babi, Yumi's co-worker and boyfriend.

== Filmography ==
=== Television series ===
Year	Title		Credited as		Notes	Ref.
Year	English	Korean	Screenwriter	Creator	Notes	Ref.
1998–2000	Soonpoong Clinic	순풍산부인과	Co-author	—N/a	Daily Sitcom	
2000–02	Why Can't We Stop Them	웬만해선 그들을 막을 수 없다	Co-author	—N/a	Daily Sitcom	
2002–03	Honest Living	똑바로 살아라	Co-author	—N/a	Daily Sitcom	
2005	Cute or Crazy	귀엽거나 미치거나	Co-author	—N/a	Daily Sitcom	
2006–07	High Kick!	거침없이 하이킥!	Co-author	—N/a	Daily Sitcom	
2008	The Secret of Coocoo Island	크크섬의 비밀	Co-author	—N/a	Sitcom	
2010	Coffee House	커피하우스	Yes	—N/a	Drama	
2012	Queen and I	인현왕후의 남자	Yes	—N/a	Drama	
2013	Nine	나인: 아홉 번의 시간여행	Yes	—N/a	Drama	
2014	The Three Musketeers	삼총사	Yes	—N/a	Drama	
2016	W: Two Worlds Apart	더블유	Yes	—N/a	Drama	
2018–19	Memories of the Alhambra	알함브라 궁전의 추억	Yes	—N/a	Drama	
2021–22	Yumi's Cells	유미의 세포들	Co-author	Yes	Season 1–2	

== Accolades ==
=== Awards and nominations ===
Awards and nominations
Award ceremony	Year	Category	Recipient	Result	Ref.
Asia-Pacific Broadcasting+ Awards	2023	Excellence Award for Animation Story Telling	Yumi's Cells Season 2	Won	
Asian Academy Creative Awards	2022	Best Original Programme by a Streamer/OTT (Korea)	Yumi's Cells Season 1 and 2	Won	
Asian Academy Creative Awards	2022	Grand Award for Best Original Programme by a Streamer/OTT (Note: National winners automatically compete with the winners from other countries for the Grand Award.)	Yumi's Cells Season 1 and 2	Won	
53rd Baeksang Arts Awards	2017	Best Drama	W: Two Worlds Apart	Nominated	
53rd Baeksang Arts Awards	2017	Best Screenplay	W: Two Worlds Apart	Nominated	
Blue Dragon Series Awards	2022	Best Drama	Yumi's Cells Season 1	Nominated	
4th KIPA Award Writer Award	2003	Best Screenplay	Honest Living	Won	
20th Korean Broadcasting Writers' Awards	2007	Best Screenplay	High Kick!	Won (Note: Award shared with Lee So-jeong, Lee Young-cheol and Choi Jeong-hyun)	
Korea Communications Commission Broadcasting Awards	2017	Korean Wave Program Excellence Prize	W: Two Worlds Apart	Won	
Korea Communications Commission Broadcasting Awards	2023	Excellence Award in the OTT/Web/App Content Category	Yumi's Cells Season 2	Won	
36th MBC Drama Awards	2016	Writer of the Year Award	W: Two Worlds Apart	Won	
36th MBC Drama Awards	2016	Drama of the Year	W: Two Worlds Apart	Won	
Seoul International Drama Awards	2017	Outstanding Korean Drama	W: Two Worlds Apart	Won	
tvN10 Awards	2016	Best Content Award, Drama	Nine: Nine Time Travels	Won	
50th WorldFest Houston International Film Festival	2017	Special Jury Award	W: Two Worlds Apart	Won	

=== State honors ===
State honors
Country	Award Ceremony	Year	Honor	Ref.
South Korea	Korean Content Awards (Note: Korean Content Awards (대한민국 콘텐츠 대상) organized by the Korea Creative Content Agency and hosted by the Ministry of Culture, Sports and Tourism. The Korea Content Awards Ceremony was established in 2009 with the aim of instilling pride in the content industry and fostering the development of the Korean cultural content industry by recognizing and honoring contributors and outstanding content that have contributed to the industry's growth in 2022. It serves as a platform to promote the winners (works) of honor, which are recommended through the Korea Creative Content Agency's website (www.kocca.kr) and announced after careful evaluation by experts and a three-step verification process, showcasing the leading role of the Korean content industry on the global stage.)	2013	Minister of Culture, Sports and Tourism Commendation for Contribution to the development of Broadcasting Video Industry Development; Nine	
South Korea	Korean Content Awards	2016	Minister of Culture, Sports and Tourism Commendation for Contribution to the development of Broadcasting Video Industry Development; W: Two Worlds Apart	

=== Listicles ===
listicle of Song
Publisher	Year	Listicle	Placement	Ref.
Cine21	2023	22 Writers	Placed	
