= Kim Eui-sung =

South Korean actor (born 1965)

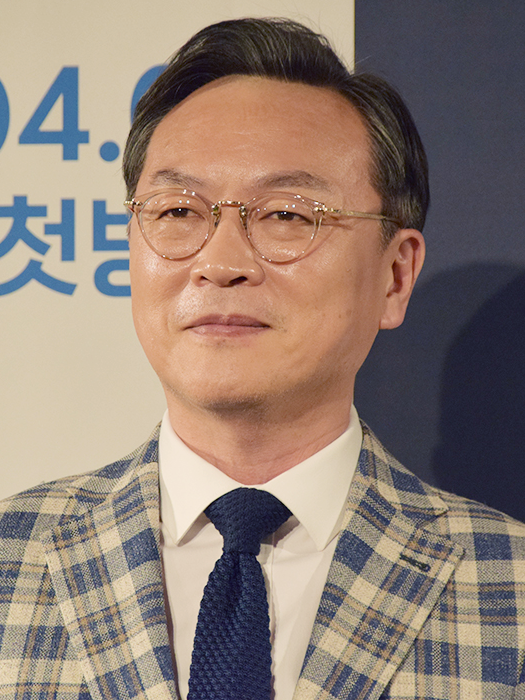
- Kim in 2019
- Born: December 17, 1965 (age 60); Seoul, South Korea
- Education: Seoul National University (BBA)
- Occupation: Actor
- Years active: 1988–present
- Agent: An Company

Korean name
- Hangul: 김의성
- RR: Gim Uiseong
- MR: Kim Ŭisŏng

Kim Eui-sung (Korean: 김의성; born December 17, 1965) is a South Korean actor. He is a first-generation film actor who started as a stage actor in the 1980s and 1990s. He is known for his roles in the films The Day a Pig Fell into the Well (1996), Office (2015), The Exclusive: Beat the Devil's Tattoo (2015), and Train to Busan (2016), as well as the television dramas W (2016) and Taxi Driver (2021–2026).

== Early life and education ==
Kim Eui-sung is a graduate of Seoul National University's Department of Business Administration, Class of 1984. He is a first-generation movie star from the 1980s and 1990s. Kim began acting in college by joining the drama club in his sophomore year. His inspiration came from watching a school play and attending an after-party. He performed two-person plays with his senior, Jung Jin-young, traveling across the country. From 1987, he was active in various theater companies such as Cheonjeyeon, Han River, Hanyang Repertory, Yeonwoo Stage, and Hakchon.

== Career ==
=== Early career ===
Kim made his screen debut in 1988. In 1994, he played the role of photographer Jang Ik-gu in Kim Soo-hyun's work, "Farewell". He began to gain attention after appearing in director Hong Sang-soo's 1996 film The Day a Pig Fell into the Well. He also appeared in various films and dramas, including Go Alone Like a Rhinoceros, Deep Water Soup, Barricade, and Ju No Myeong Bakery.

=== Acting hiatus and production work ===
He paused his acting career for more than a decade to work as a producer, and the CEO for Vietnam at FnC Media in 2001 and CJ Media in 2006. He stepped away from acting due to dissatisfaction with his performances. While in Vietnam, he produced a successful local drama, but his tendency of prioritizing the work over profit led to financial struggles and long efforts to save money.

=== Return to acting ===
In 2010, he met director Hong Sang-soo again and returned to acting, appearing in The Day He Arrives the following year. He gained renewed attention for his role as Han Myeong-hoe in The Face Reader. In 2015, he played Jeong Mong-ju, the final boss of the Goryeo faction, in the SBS drama Six Flying Dragons. His performance reciting a poem during Jeong Mong-ju's final scene on Seonjuk Bridge was highly praised and considered one of the most iconic scenes in the series.

Since his comeback, he has also appeared in various films such as Bukchon Direction, Architecture 101, Namyeong-dong 1985, 26 Years, Nobody's Daughter Haewon, Twenty, Minority Opinion, Assassination, and Office.

=== Villain roles and further recognition ===
In the worldwide hit film Train to Busan, released in July 2016, Kim played the supporting role of Yong-suk, a business executive and COO. His role left a strong impression to the audience, establishing him as a specialist in playing despicable characters. Kim gained recognition for his villain role in Train to Busan, and has also been part of projects like The Priests, Inside Men, Yourself and Yours, The King, Steel Rain, 1987, Golden Slumber, Rampant, Extreme Job, and Intimate Strangers.

Kim gained more recognition in the MBC drama W by portraying Oh Sung-moo, a webtoon writer and the father of lead character played by Han Hyo-joo. He was nominated for the Best Couple Award with Lee Si-eon, although the award went to Lee Jong-suk and Han Hyo-joo. In 2017, Kim signed an exclusive contract with Artist Company.

In addition to film works, he has appeared in dramas such as Positive Constitution, Mr. Sunshine, Memories of the Alhambra, Dear Citizens!, and Arthdal Chronicles. He was also the host of MBC's exploration program Straight.

In the drama Mr. Sunshine, he played as Yi Wan-ik / Rinoie Hiroaki, Kudo Hina's father. His role was a selfish and cruel pro-Japanese official who is responsible for the deaths of Go Ae-shin's parents. He showcased a possessed level of acting, while speaking Korean (with a Hamgyeong-do dialect), Japanese and English. His Japanese speaking was particularly noted for its high-level pronunciation and praised by native speakers.

In Memories of the Alhambra, he played as Cha Byung-jun, a selfish and greedy university professor in Seoul. He is Cha Hyung-seok's (Park Hoon) father and meets his demise when NPCs, created by a bug, inadvertently cause his death while trying to manipulate Yoo Jin-woo (Hyun Bin).

=== Recent works ===
In 2020, Kim left Artist Company and joined KeyEast.

In 2021, he played a main role in the SBS drama Taxi Driver as Jang Sung-chul. Unlike his previous villain roles, Kim's character in this series is a good character with a ruthless side, earning praise for his performance. The drama also achieved decent viewership ratings.

Starting from October 15, 2022, he appeared as Chief State Councillor Hwang Won-hyeong in the fusion historical drama Under the Queen's Umbrella. He delivered another strong performance as a ruthless and ambitious villain, engaging in intense charisma battles with Kim Hye-soo, who played as the Queen, and Kim Hae-sook, who played as the Queen Dowager. The series was a commercial hit and one of the highest-rated dramas in Korean cable television history.

In 2023, Kim portrayed as Minister of National Defense Oh Guk-sang in the film 12.12: The Day, directed by Kim Sung-su, and starring Hwang Jung-min, Jung Woo-sung, Lee Sung-min, Park Hae-joon and Kim Sung-kyun. Set against the backdrop of the December 12, 1979 military coup from the late 1970s to early 1980s, it was released in theaters on November 22, 2023. Despite playing a supporting role, his performance evoked more anger from the audience than the main villains. The film grossed over US$97 million worldwide against a budget of approximately $17 million, making it highest-grossing Korean film of 2023. As of June 2024, 12.12: The Day ranks as the fourth highest-grossing film and the sixth most-viewed film in South Korean film history. Later on, Kim has established his own agency Ahn Company.

== Filmography ==
=== Film ===
Year	Title	Role	Notes/Ref.
1995	Mom Has a Lover		
1996	The Day a Pig Fell into the Well	Hyo-seop	
1997	3pm Paradise		
1997	Barricade		
2011	The Day He Arrives	Joong-won	
2012	26 Years	Chief Choi	
2012	National Security	Kang Su-hyeon	
2012	Architecture 101	Professor Kang	
2013	The Face Reader	Han Myung-hoi	
2013	Running Man	Director Kim	
2013	Nobody's Daughter Haewon	Joong-won	
2013	The Suspect	Deputy department head Shin	
2014	Big Match	Detective Do	
2014	Hill of Freedom	Sang-won	
2014	Tabloid Truth	Park Young-jin	
2015	Assassination	Butler of Kang family	
2015	Minority Opinion	Prosecutor	
2015	The Priests	Dean of clergy	
2015	Office	Kim Sang-gyu	
2015	The Exclusive: Beat the Devil's Tattoo	Director Moon	
2015	Twenty	Chi-ho's father	
2015	The Deal	Son Myung-soo	
2015	Love Guide for Dumpees	Doctor	
2015	Inside Men	Editor-in-chief	
2016	Train to Busan	Yon-suk	
2016	The Truth Beneath	No Jae-soon	Special appearance
2016	A Quiet Dream	President	Special appearance
2016	Yourself and Yours	Kim Joong-haeng	
2016	A Star of Greed	Narrator	Documentary
2017	The King	Kim Eung-soo	
2017	The Reservoir Game	Voice	Documentary
2017	Steel Rain	Lee Ee-seong	
2017	1987: When the Day Comes		Special appearance
2018	Golden Slumber	Mr. Min	
2018	Rampant	King Lee Jo	
2018	The Man Only I Can See		Special appearance
2019	Extreme Job	Police superintendent	
2019	Trade Your Love	Captain Chae	
2021	The Book of Fish	Official Jang	Cameo
2022	Special Delivery	Baek Kang-cheol	
2022	My Candle	Director	Documentary film
2022	Alienoid	Ja-jang	
2023	12.12: The Day	Oh Guk-sang	
2024	Alienoid: Return to the Future	Ja-jang	
2025	Lobby	Choi Woo-hyun	

=== Television series ===
Year	Title	Role	Notes/Ref.
2015	Six Flying Dragons	Jeong Mong-ju	
2016	W	Oh Sung-moo / Han Sang-hoon	
2018	Mr. Sunshine	Lee Wan-ik	
2018	Memories of the Alhambra	Cha Byung-jun	
2019	My Fellow Citizens!	Kim Joo-myung	
2019	Arthdal Chronicles	Sang-ung	
2021–present	Taxi Driver	Jang Sung-chul	Seasons 1–3
2022	WeCrashed	Masayoshi Son	
2022	Under the Queen's Umbrella	Hwang Won-hyeong	
2023	Black Knight	Grandpa	
2024	Flex X Cop	himself	Cameo (ep. 1)
2025	The Trauma Code: Heroes on Call	Choi Jo-eun	
2025	The Recruit	NIS Director Choi	
2025	Low Life	Professor Kim	
2025	Cashero	Jo Won-do	
TBA	Knock-Off †	Bae Pil-gu	

=== Web series ===
Year	Title	Role	Ref.
2016	Be Positive	Hwan-dong's father	

=== Theater ===
Theater play performances of Kim
Year	Title		Role	Venue	Date	Ref.
Year	English	Korean	Role	Venue	Date	Ref.
2011	Kang Full's Pure Love Comic	순정만화	Yeon-woo	Daehakro Gum Art Hall	April 26	
2012	Into the Charm of Boeing Boeing! GO! GO!	연극 만원(滿員) 네 번째 보잉보잉의 매력 속으로 GO! GO!	Seong-gi	Seongnam Arts Center Ensemble Theater	November 9 to 11	
2013	Woman in Black	우먼인블랙		Dongsung Art Centre Small Theatre	June 26 to September 22	

== Awards and nominations ==
Year	Award	Category	Nominated work	Result
2014	50th Baeksang Arts Awards	Best Supporting Actor (film)	The Face Reader	Nominated
2016	2016 MBC Drama Awards	Golden Acting Award, Actor in a Miniseries	W	Won
2016	5th APAN Star Awards	Acting Award, Actor	W	Won
2016	25th Buil Film Awards	Best Supporting Actor	Train to Busan	Won
2016	37th Blue Dragon Film Awards	Best Supporting Actor	Train to Busan	Nominated
2017	22nd Chunsa Film Art Awards	Best Supporting Actor	Train to Busan	Nominated
2017	53rd Baeksang Arts Awards	Best Supporting Actor (film)	Train to Busan	Won
2021	2021 SBS Drama Awards	Best Supporting Actor in a Mini-series Genre/Fantasy Drama	Taxi Driver	Won
2025	2025 SBS Drama Awards	Best Performance	Taxi Driver 3	Won
