= Ga Deuk-hee =

South Korean actress (born 1984)

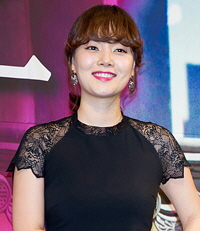
- Ga in 2012
- Born: March 31, 1984 (age 42); South Korea
- Education: Seoul Institute of the Arts - Theater and Film
- Occupation: Actress
- Years active: 2008-present
- Agent: Lydus Contents Company

Korean name
- Hangul: 가득희
- Hanja: 賈得熙
- RR: Ga Deukhui
- MR: Ka Tŭkhŭi

Ga Deuk-hee (Korean: 가득희; born March 31, 1984) is a South Korean actress.

== Filmography ==
=== Television series ===
| Year | Title | Role |
|---|---|---|
| 2009 | The Road Home | |
| 2009 | Partner | Oh Young-yi |
| 2009 | Hometown of Legends "Myo-jeong's Pearl" | So-bin |
| 2010 | Queen of Reversals | Bu Min-ah |
| 2011 | The Princess' Man | Lady Ryu |
| 2011 | Can't Lose | Ga Deuk-hee |
| 2011 | You're Here, You're Here, You're Really Here | Laura Jang |
| 2012 | Queen and I | Jo Soo-kyung |
| 2012 | Golden Time | Seo Hyo-eun |
| 2013 | Nine | Kim Yoo-jin (1992) |
| 2013 | Hur Jun, The Original Story | Se-hee |
| 2013 | The King's Daughter, Soo Baek-hyang | Na-eun |
| 2014 | My Spring Days | Joo Se-na |
| 2015 | Sweet, Savage Family | Park Sun-young |
| 2017 | The Bride of Habaek | Special appearance |
