= Lee Chae-yoon =

South Korean businessman (born 1950)

- 이채윤
- Born: August 6, 1950 (age 75); Namhae County, South Gyeongsang Province, South Korea
- Education: Dong-Eui University; KAIST
- Occupation: Businessman
- Employer: Leeno Industrial

Korean name
- Hangul: 이채윤
- RR: I Chaeyun
- MR: I Ch'aeyun

Lee Chae-yoon (Korean: 이채윤; born August 6, 1950) is a South Korean businessman. The founder and chairman of semiconductor testing equipment company Leeno Industrial, he is among the richest people in South Korea. In April 2024, Forbes estimated his net worth as US$1.08 billion and ranked him 35h richest in South Korea.

Lee was born on August 6, 1950 in Namhae County, South Gyeongsang Province, South Korea. He graduated from Kwangsung Engineering High School (광성공업고등학교) in 1969. He founded Leeno Industrial in 1978; he named the company using a combination of his and his wife's surnames. In 1991, he graduated from Dong-Eui University. He graduated from an executive education program at KAIST. In 2001, Leeno Industrial became listed on the stock exchange KOSDAQ.

In 2024, Lee was the largest shareholder of Leeno Industrial, with a 35% stake in the company. In 2024, amidst a surge in investments in artificial intelligence–related stocks, Leeno Industrial's shares rose 70% in value. This made Lee a billionaire.
