= Jung Yoo-jin =

South Korean actress model (born 1989)

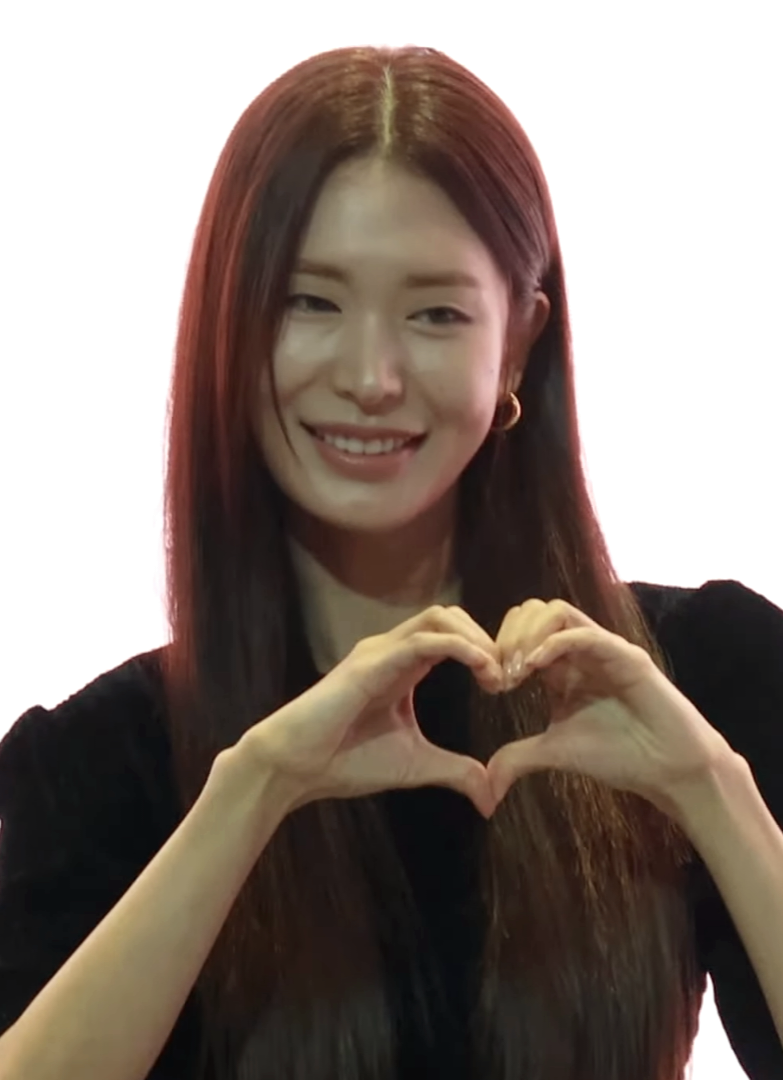
- Jung in August 2024
- Born: February 19, 1989 (age 37); Busan, South Korea
- Occupations: Actress; model
- Agent(s): Nexus E&M

Korean name
- Hangul: 정유진
- Hanja: 鄭釉珍
- RR: Jeong Yujin
- MR: Chŏng Yujin
- Website: nexus-enm.com

Jung Yoo-jin (Korean: 정유진; born February 19, 1989), also known as Eugene Jung, is a South Korean actress and model.

== Career ==
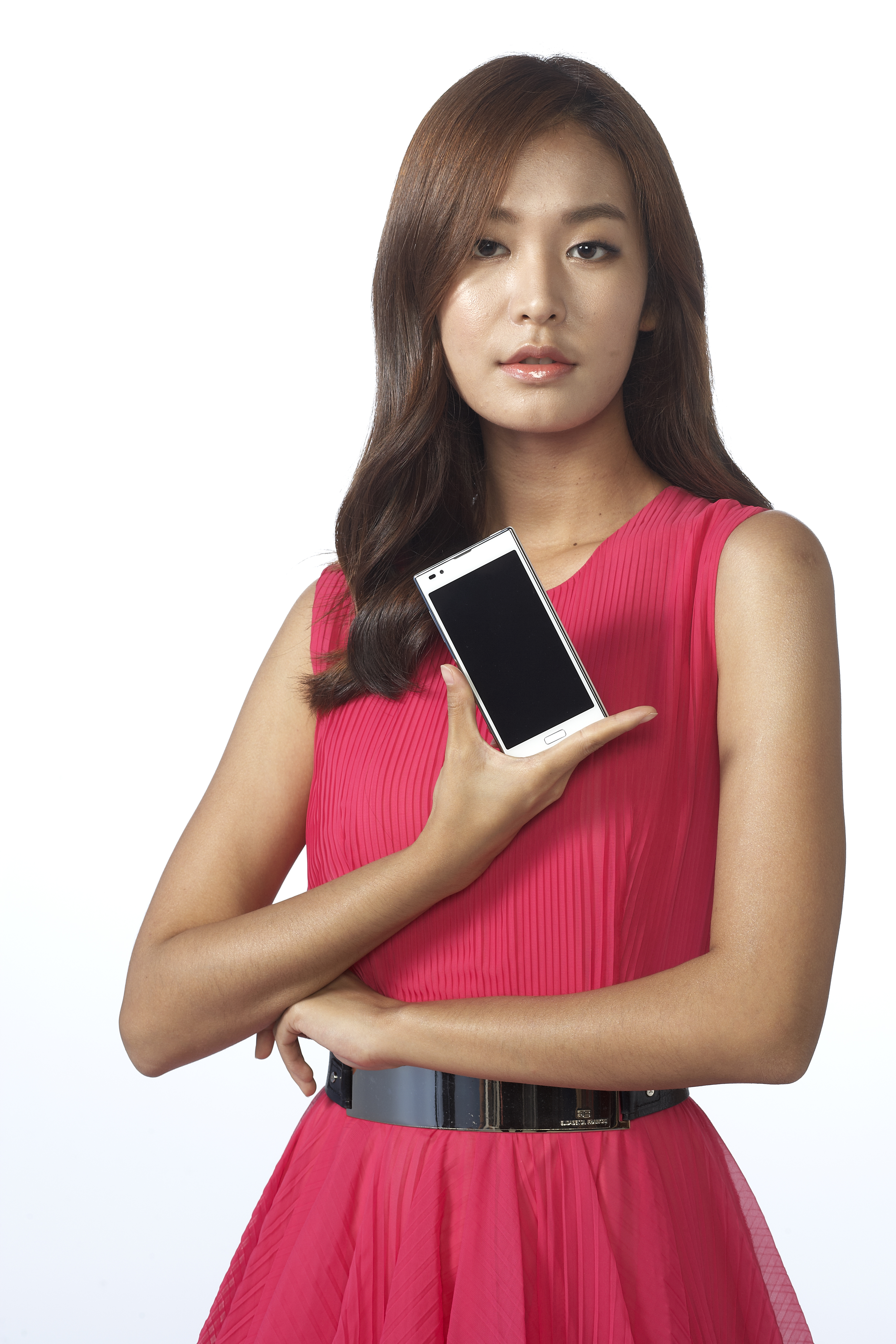
Jung for LG in 2012

Jung started her career as a model in her teens under YG KPlus. She has walked runways for multiple luxury fashion brands including Louis Vuitton, Fendi, Chanel and DKNY.

She is known for her roles in Korean dramas, such as Heard It Through the Grapevine (2015), Moorim School (2016), W (2016) and Snowdrop (2021–2022).

In February 2018, Jung signed with new management agency FNC Entertainment. On March 3, 2022, Jung's contract with FNC Entertainment had expired.

== Filmography ==
=== Film ===
Year	Title	Role	Notes	Ref.
1995	301, 302	Oh Rin-yi		
1997	Beat	Kyeong-ja		
2016	Like for Likes	Actress	Cameo	
2018	Summer Vacation	Soo-yeon		
2019	Tune in for Love	Hyun-Joo		
2021	A Year-End Medley	young Catherine	Special appearance	
2024	The Desperate Chase	Lee Soo-jin		
2025	Boss	Yeon-im		
2026	Humint	Assistant Manager Lim		

=== Television series ===
Key
†	Denotes television productions that have not yet been released

Year	Title	Role	Notes	Ref.
2015	Heard It Through the Grapevine	Jang Hyun-soo		
2015	My First Time	Ryoo Se-hyun		
2016	Moorim School: Saga of the Brave	Chae Young / Hwang Seon-ah		
2016	W	Yoon So-hee		
2018	Something in the Rain	Kang Se-young		
2018	Still 17	Kang Hee-soo		
2018	Drama Stage – "Push and Out of Prison"	Joo-young		
2019	Romance Is a Bonus Book	Song Hae-rin		
2019	Catch the Ghost	Ha Ma-ri		
2021–2022	Snowdrop	Jang Han-na		
2022	Remarriage & Desires	Jin Yu-hee		
2022	Curtain Call	Song Hyo-rin	Cameo	
2023	Celebrity	Choi Bom	Cameo (Ep. 7–8)	
2024	DNA Lover	Jang Mi-eun		
2026	Final Table	Seon Jeong-won		

=== Television shows ===
Year	Title	Role	Ref.
2010	Inspire Now	Herself	
2014	Fashion Lab	Herself	

=== Music video appearances ===
Year	Title	Artist	Ref.
2011	"V.V.I.P"	Seungri	
2014	"Skeleton"	Super Junior Donghae & Eunhyuk	
2014	"Sweet (Brand New Mix)"	Lena Park featuring Verbal Jint	
2017	"Crazy"	Han Dong-geun	
2018	"Still Love You"	F.T. Island Lee Hongki and N.Flying Yoo Hwiseung	
