= Nine (TV series) =

2013 South Korean television series

- Promotional poster
- Also known as: 9 Nine: Time Traveling Nine Times
- Genre: Romance; Time travel Mystery
- Written by: Song Jae-jeong; Kim Yoon-joo
- Directed by: Kim Byung-soo
- Starring: Lee Jin-wook; Jo Yoon-hee
- Music by: Nam Hye-seung
- Country of origin: South Korea
- Original language: Korean
- No. of episodes: 20

Production
- Executive producers: Kim Young-gyu; Lee Jin-suk; Choi Young-gun
- Producers: Lee Sang-hee; Jung Se-ryung
- Production locations: South Korea; Nepal
- Cinematography: Jo Bong-han; Kim Young-sam; Kang Ho-gyu
- Editors: Han Soo-mi; Hong Hyo-seon
- Production companies: JS Pictures; Chorokbaem Media

Original release
- Network: tvN
- Release: 11 March – 14 May 2013

Nine (Korean: 나인: 아홉 번의 시간여행; RR: Nain: ahop beonui siganyeohaeng; lit. 'Nine: Nine Time Travels') is a 2013 South Korean television series starring Lee Jin-wook and Jo Yoon-hee. It aired on tvN from March 11 to May 14, 2013, on Mondays and Tuesdays at 23:00 (KST) for 20 episodes.

According to a news article released by Deadline Hollywood on October 25, 2013, an American remake of this series was put into development by ABC; however, it was never produced.

== Concept ==
The science fiction / romance series is about a man who finds nine magical incense sticks that allow him to travel 20 years back in time. He attempts to keep his family safe in order to change the world he lives in today. However, this is not without consequences as his actions in the past affects the lives of many in the present, including his.

As the show has a unique way of dealing with the concept of time travel, its ending is open to interpretation.

== Synopsis ==
Nine tells the story of a man who finds nine incense items which allows him to travel 20 years back in time.

== Cast ==
2012/2013

- Lee Jin-wook as Park Sun-woo

A news anchor at a TV broadcast station. A tragedy happens to his family, so he gets the chance to travel back in time to avenge them, and at the same time recover his love. But he has a limited number of trips to the past, to try and pinpoint the right moment to go back and change.

- Jo Yoon-hee as Joo Min-young

A junior reporter, and Sun-woo's colleague.

- Jeon No-min as Park Jung-woo

Sun-woo's older brother, who holds the key to solving a mystery — a crime that Sun-woo is trying to solve as he bounces back and forth in time.

- Kim Hee-ryung as Son Myung-hee (65)
  - Jin Ye-sol as young Myung-hee 45 years ago

Sun-woo and Jung-woo's mother.

- Jung Dong-hwan as Choi Jin-chul (67)
  - Seo Dong-won as young Jin-chul 45 years ago

Chairman of stem cell research company.

- Lee Eung-kyung as Kim Yoo-jin
- Um Hyo-sup as Oh Chul-min (52)

CBM station president.

- Lee Seung-joon as Han Young-hoon

A neurosurgeon, and Sun-woo's best friend.

- Yeon Je-wook as Kim Beom-seok
- Oh Min-suk as Kang Seo-joon

A surgical resident, and Min-young's boyfriend.

- Greena Park as Lee Joo-hee
- Yoo Se-rye as Sung Eun-joo
- Lee Jun-hyeok as Sang-beom

CBM News team leader.

- Lee Si-woo as Young-soo
- Kim Won-hae as Park Chang-min (64)
- Lee Han-wi as Joo Sung-hoon

Min-young's stepfather.

- Park Won-sang as (cameo)

1992/1993

- Park Hyung-sik as Park Sun-woo
- Jo Min-ah as Joo Min-young
- Seo Woo-jin as Park Jung-woo
- Park Moon-ah as Sung Eun-joo
- Kim Hee-ryung as Son Myung-hee (45)
- Jeon Guk-hwan as Park Chun-soo
- Jung Dong-hwan as Choi Jin-chul (47)
- Um Hyo-sup as Oh Chul-min (32)
- Lee Yi-kyung as Han Young-hoon

A model student.

- Na Hae-ryung as Han So-ra
- Ga Deuk-hee as Kim Yoo-jin
- Kim Won-hae as Park Chang-min (44)

== Awards and nominations ==
Year	Award	Category	Recipient	Result
2013	7th Mnet 20's Choice Awards	20's Drama Star - Male	Lee Jin-wook	Won
2013	6th Korea Drama Awards	Grand Prize (Daesang)	Lee Jin-wook	Nominated
2013	6th Korea Drama Awards	Top Excellence Award, Actress	Jo Yoon-hee	Won
2013	6th Korea Drama Awards	Best Production Director	Kim Byung-soo	Nominated
2013	6th Korea Drama Awards	Best Couple Award	Lee Jin-wook and Jo Yoon-hee	Nominated
2013	2nd APAN Star Awards	Excellence Award, Actor	Lee Jin-wook	Nominated
2013	2nd APAN Star Awards	Best Production Director	Kim Byung-soo	Won
2014	50th Baeksang Arts Awards	Most Popular Actor (TV)	Lee Jin-wook	Nominated
2016	tvN10 Awards	Best Content Award, Drama	Nine	Won
2016	tvN10 Awards	Best Kiss Award	Lee Jin-wook and Jo Yoon-hee	Nominated

== International broadcast ==
Country	Network(s)/Station(s)	Series premiere	Title
(South Korea)	TVN	March 11, 2013 – May 14, 2013 (tvN月火連續劇)	나인: 아홉 번의 시간여행 ( ; lit: )
Hong Kong	Drama Channel (有線劇集台)	September 16, 2013 – October 11, 2013 (Monday to Friday 19:00 – 20:00)	Nine：九回時間旅行 ( ; lit: )
Hong Kong	TVB TVB J2	September 24, 2014 – October 21, 2014 (Monday to Friday 22:30 – 23:30)	Nine：九回時間旅行 ( ; lit: )
(Hong Kong) / (Taiwan)	Channel M	September 8, 2014 – November 11, 2014 (Monday, Tuesday 22:00 – 23:05)	Nine：九回時間旅行 ( ; lit: )
(Taiwan)	EBC (東森戲劇台)	October 14, 2014 – November 11, 2014 (Monday to Friday 22:00 – 23:00)	Nine：九回時間旅行 ( ; lit: )
(Taiwan)	EBC (東森戲劇台)	November 2, 2015 – December 7, 2015 (Monday to Thursday 23:00 – 24:00)	Nine：九回時間旅行 ( ; lit: )
(Malaysia)	8TV (Chinese, later in original Korean version)	December 1, December - December 26, 2014 (Monday to Friday 20:30-21:30)	Nine (TV series), Nine：九回時間旅行 ( ; lit: )
Thailand	Workpoint TV	April 5 – June 8, 2014 (Every Saturday and Sunday from 11:00 to 12:00)	9 Times Time Travel ลิขิตรักข้ามเวลา ( ; lit: )
Thailand	True4U	August 29, 2018 – ? (Every Wednesday and Thursday at 20:30 – 22:00)	9 Times Time Travel ลิขิตรักข้ามเวลา ( ; lit: )
