= Shopping King Louie =

2016 South Korean television series

- Official Poster
- Also known as: Shopaholic Louis; Shopping King Louis
- Genre: Romantic comedy
- Written by: Oh Ji-young
- Directed by: Lee Sang-yeob
- Starring: Seo In-guk; Nam Ji-hyun; Yoon Sang-hyun; Im Se-mi
- Country of origin: South Korea
- Original language: Korean
- No. of episodes: 16

Production
- Executive producer: Kim Sang-ho
- Producer: Kim Ho-joon
- Production locations: South Korea; France
- Cinematography: Hwang Sung-man; Song Gab-young
- Editor: Kim Na-young
- Running time: 70 minutes
- Production company: MBC Drama Production Division

Original release
- Network: MBC TV
- Release: September 21 – November 10, 2016

Shopping King Louie (Korean: 쇼핑왕 루이; RR: Syopingwang Rui) is a 2016 South Korean television series starring Seo In-guk, Nam Ji-hyun, Yoon Sang-hyun and Im Se-mi. It aired on Wednesdays and Thursdays at 22:00 (KST) on MBC from September 21 to November 10, 2016.

== Synopsis ==
A romantic comedy about Louis (Seo In-guk), a rich heir who always spends money to buy everything that has a subtle beauty talking to his soul. One day he loses his memory and meets Bok-shil (Nam Ji-hyun), a pure and energetic woman from the countryside. She is at first astounded by his spending habits. In the process of teaching him to only buy bare necessities or inexpensive small kindnesses that lighten up one's day, she also learns that bare necessities are not same for everyone as they depend on everyone's own values that shape their life and thus their shopping patterns. Both have innate innocence which bring them to care for each other, leading to undeniable love.

== Cast ==
=== Main ===
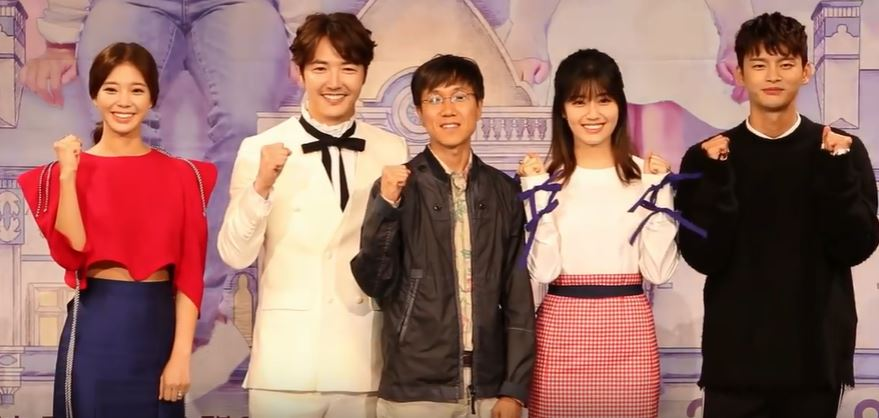
The cast, with the director standing in the middle, at the press conference

- Seo In-guk as Louis / Kang Ji-sung (25 years old)

The last surviving heir of a chaebol chairman. Having grown up in a sheltered and pampered environment in France, he turns to retail therapy to curb his loneliness. One day, he finds himself dropped into the bustling Seoul after having lost his memory.

- Nam Ji-hyun as Ko Bok-shil (21 years old)

A country bumpkin from the Gangwon Province, who has a sweet personality. Though she is illiterate with technology, Bok-shil is quick on her feet and adapts well to situations.

- Yoon Sang-hyun as Cha Joong-won

The director of Gold Group's merchandising department and Goldline.com. He has a prickly personality and is Louis's rival in love.

- Im Se-mi as Baek Ma-ri

Louis' childhood friend, who has a one-sided love for him because of his title. She later falls for her boss, Joong-won.

=== Supporting ===
==== People around Louis ====
- Kim Young-ok as Choi Il-soon, Louis' grandma and the Chairman of Gold Group.
- Kim Sun-young as Heo Jung-ran, Il-soon's assistant
- Um Hyo-sup as Kim Ho-joon, Louis' butler

==== People around Bok-shil ====
- Ryu Ui-hyun as Go Bok-nam, Bok-shil's brother
- Kang Ji-sub as Nam Joon-hyuk, Bok-shil's detective friend

==== People around Joong-won ====
- Nam Myeong-ryeol as Cha Soo-il, Joong-won's father
- Kim Bo-yeon as Shin Young-ae, Joong-won's mother

==== Employees at Gold Group ====
- Kim Kyu-chul as Baek Sun-goo, Ma-ri's father; and the President of Gold Group who schemes to take over the conglomerate.
- Yoon Yoo-sun as Hong Jae-sook, Ma-ri's mother
- Yoon Sa-bong as Yeji
- Kim Byung-chul as Lee Kyung-kook
- Cha Chung-hwa as Kwon Mi-young
- Lee Jae-kyoon as Byun Do-jin

==== Rooftop Neighbors ====
- Oh Dae-hwan as Jo In-sung
- Hwang Young-hee as Hwang Geum-ja

=== Special appearances ===
- Mi-ram as Park Hye-joo
- Chae Soo-bin as Wang Mong-shil

== Production ==
First script reading took place on July 15, 2016 at MBC Broadcasting Station in Sangam, South Korea and filming began on July 18. The series was based on Oh Ji-young's romantic comedy script which won the Excellence Prize in the 7th Broadcasting Foundation Scenario Contest (7회 드라마극본공모전 사막의별똥별찾기), hosted by the Broadcasting Contents Promotion Foundation in 2015. Despite the common material, ranging from amnesia to corporate heirs, the drama's storyline got praises from both fans and critics.

The filming location used for Louis' Castle in the first episode is the Château de Bourron near Paris in France.

== Original soundtrack ==
Shopaholic Louis : Original Soundtrack

Soundtrack album by Various Artists
- Released: November 10, 2016 (digital); November 17, 2016 (CD)
- Genre: Pop, K-pop, soundtrack
- Label: Leeway Music & Media/LOEN; L200001331
- Producer: Jake Ji-hyoung Lee (executive), Ji Pyeong-kwon (also executive)

=== Part 1 ===
No.	Title	Lyrics	Music	Artist	Length
1.	""Navigation""	Louis	Ji Pyeong-kwon, Shin Hyung, Jun Ja-maen	Kim So-hee (I.B.I)	3:30
2.	""Navigation"" (Inst.)		Ji Pyeong-kwon, Shin Hyung, Jun Ja-maen		3:30
Total length:					7:00

=== Part 2 ===
No.	Title	Lyrics	Music	Artist	Length
1.	""The Way""	Louis, Shin Hyung	Ji Pyeong-kwon, Shin Hyung	Umji (GFriend)	3:43
2.	""The Way"" (Inst.)		Ji Pyeong-kwon, Shin Hyung		3:43
Total length:					7:26

=== Part 3 ===
No.	Title	Lyrics	Music	Artist	Length
1.	""The Time""	Lee Ha-jin	Ji Pyeong-kwon, Shin Hyung	Juniel	4:38
2.	""The Time"" (Inst.)		Ji Pyeong-kwon, Shin Hyung		4:38
Total length:					9:16

=== Part 4 ===
No.	Title	Lyrics	Music	Artist	Length
1.	""Hello""	Shin Hyung, Taibian	Ji Pyeong-kwon, Taibian	SunBee	3:44
2.	""Hello"" (Inst.)		Ji Pyeong-kwon, Taibian		3:44
Total length:					7:28

=== Part 5 ===
No.	Title	Lyrics	Music	Artist	Length
1.	""Love Is""	Shin Hyung, Taibian	Ji Pyeong-kwon, Taibian	Joo Yoon-ha	3:44
2.	""Love Is"" (Inst.)		Ji Pyeong-kwon, Taibian		3:44
Total length:					7:28

=== Part 6 ===
No.	Title	Lyrics	Music	Artist	Length
1.	""Falling Slowly"" (스르르)	Lee H.J.	Ji Pyeong-kwon, Shin Hyung	Gyepy	2:47
2.	""Falling Slowly"" (Inst.)		Ji Pyeong-kwon, Shin Hyung		2:47
Total length:					5:34

=== Part 7 ===
No.	Title	Lyrics	Music	Artists	Length
1.	""The Tiger Moth"" (부나비)	Taibian	Ji Pyeong-kwon, Shin Hyung, Lee Jong-won	Monsta X	3:25
2.	""The Tiger Moth"" (Inst.)		Ji Pyeong-kwon, Shin Hyung, Lee Jong-won		3:25
3.	""The Tiger Moth (Acoustic Version)""	Taibian	Ji Pyeong-kwon, Shin Hyung, Lee Jong-won	Kihyun (Monsta X)	3:12
4.	""The Tiger Moth (Acoustic Version)"" (Inst.)		Ji Pyeong-kwon, Shin Hyung, Lee Jong-won		3:12
Total length:					13:14

=== Part 8 ===
No.	Title	Lyrics	Music	Artists	Length
1.	""Fine""	Jo Hyung-woo	Jo Hyung-woo	Jang Jae-in, Jo Hyung-woo	4:16
2.	""Fine"" (Inst.)		Jo Hyung-woo		4:16
Total length:					8:32

Songs featured in the television series but not included in the original soundtrack include:

- "She" by Elvis Costello, featured in Ep. 1, 3, 7, and 16.
- "A Whole New World" by Brad Kane and Lea Salonga, featured in Ep. 2.
- "Memory" by Barbra Streisand, featured in Ep. 4.
- "Goodnight Moon" by Shivaree, featured in Ep. 5.
- "I Was Born To Love You" by Queen, featured in Ep. 6.
- "Perhaps Love" by John Denver, featured in Ep. 7.
- "Be My Baby" by The Ronettes, featured in Ep. 8.
- "Can't Smile Without You" by Barry Manilow, featured in Ep. 9.
- "The Moon Represents My Heart" by Teresa Teng, featured in Ep. 10.
- "Reality" by Richard Sanderson, featured in Ep. 12.
- "My Way" by Frank Sinatra, featured in Ep. 15.
- "I'm Your Man" by Leonard Cohen, featured in the final episode.

== Ratings ==
Ep.	Title (Note: Each episode title is taken from a popular song title.)	Original broadcast date	Average audience share			
Ep.	Title	Original broadcast date	Nielsen Korea		TNmS Ratings	
Ep.	Title	Original broadcast date	Nationwide	Seoul	Nationwide	Seoul
1	Pick Me	September 21, 2016	5.6% (NR)	6.5% (NR)	5.4% (NR)	7.0% (NR)
2	A Whole New World	September 22, 2016	6.2% (NR)	7.0% (19th)	6.3% (NR)	5.9% (NR)
3	She	September 28, 2016	7.0% (NR)	7.3% (17th)	7.4% (20th)	7.7% (17th)
4	Memory	September 29, 2016	7.8% (17th)	8.4% (13th)	8.5% (17th)	8.5% (15th)
5	Starry, Starry Night	October 6, 2016 (Note: Episode 5 didn't air on Wednesday, October 5 due to the live broadcast of the DMC Festival on MBC, the episode aired on Thursday, October 6.)	8.4% (15th)	9.1% (9th)	8.2% (18th)	8.1% (16th)
6	I Was Born To Love You	October 12, 2016	8.8% (12th)	9.3% (10th)	9.9% (12th)	11.4% (6th)
7	Perhaps Love	October 13, 2016	10.0% (9th)	10.4% (8th)	10.1% (13th)	10.8% (10th)
8	Be My Baby	October 19, 2016	9.7% (9th)	10.0% (8th)	10.4% (10th)	11.4% (5th)
9	Can't Smile Without You	October 20, 2016	10.7% (8th)	11.3% (6th)	11.5% (6th)	13.1% (4th)
10	The Moon Represents My Heart	October 26, 2016	10.2% (6th)	10.4% (7th)	10.9% (6th)	11.9% (4th)
11	Dream Lover	October 27, 2016	10.5% (6th)	10.9% (6th)	11.1% (6th)	11.2% (7th)
12	Reality	November 2, 2016	11.0% (4th)	11.4% (3rd)	11.4% (5th)	11.4% (3rd)
13	This Is the Moment	November 3, 2016	10.0% (9th)	10.6% (8th)	11.4% (7th)	12.8% (6th)
14	The Winner Takes It All	November 9, 2016	10.4% (6th)	11.1% (5th)	8.8% (14th)	9.4% (7th)
15	My Way	November 10, 2016	9.7% (9th)	10.3% (7th)	10.9% (7th)	11.7% (6th)
16	When You Wish Upon A Star	November 10, 2016	8.9% (14th)	9.7% (10th)	9.2% (16th)	9.3% (10th)
Average			9.0%	9.6%	9.4%	10.1%
In the table above, the blue numbers represent the lowest ratings and the red numbers represent the highest ratings.; NR denotes that the episode did not rank in the top 20 daily programs on that date.

== Awards and nominations ==
Year	Award	Category	Recipient	Result
2016	35th MBC Drama Awards	Drama of the Year	Shopaholic Louis	Nominated
2016	35th MBC Drama Awards	Grand Prize (Daesang)	Seo In-guk	Nominated
2016	35th MBC Drama Awards	Excellence Award, Actor in a Miniseries	Seo In-guk	Won
2016	35th MBC Drama Awards	Excellence Award, Actor in a Miniseries	Yoon Sang-hyun	Nominated
2016	35th MBC Drama Awards	Excellence Award, Actress in a Miniseries	Nam Ji-hyun	Nominated
2016	35th MBC Drama Awards	Best New Actress	Nam Ji-hyun	Won
2016	35th MBC Drama Awards	Golden Acting Award, Actor in a Miniseries	Kim Kyu-chul	Nominated
2016	35th MBC Drama Awards	Golden Acting Award, Actor in a Miniseries	Um Hyo-sup	Nominated
2016	35th MBC Drama Awards	Golden Acting Award, Actress in a Miniseries	Im Se-mi	Won
2016	35th MBC Drama Awards	Golden Acting Award, Actress in a Miniseries	Kim Sun-young	Nominated
2016	35th MBC Drama Awards	Best Couple Award	Seo In-guk and Nam Ji-hyun	Nominated
