= Queen and I (South Korean TV series) =

2012 South Korean TV series

- Promotional poster
- Also known as: Queen & I
- Hangul: 인현왕후의 남자
- Hanja: 仁顯王后의 男子
- RR: Inhyeon wanghuui namja
- MR: Inhyŏn wanghuŭi namja
- Genre: Romance; Fantasy
- Written by: Song Jae-jeong
- Directed by: Kim Byung-soo
- Starring: Ji Hyun-woo; Yoo In-na
- Country of origin: South Korea
- Original language: Korean
- No. of episodes: 16

Production
- Production company: Chorokbaem Media

Original release
- Network: tvN
- Release: April 18 – June 7, 2012

Related
- Love Weaves Through a Millennium

Queen and I (Korean: 인현왕후의 남자; lit. 'Queen Inhyeon's Man') is a 2012 South Korean television series starring Ji Hyun-woo and Yoo In-na. The story centers around obscure actress Choi Hee-jin (played by Yoo In-na, in her first leading role) who falls in love with Kim Bung-do (played by Ji Hyun-woo), a time-traveling scholar from the Joseon period (1392–1910) who jumps 300 years into the future to the 21st century.

It was broadcast on cable channel tvN from April 18 to June 7, 2012 on Wednesdays and Thursdays at 23:00 for 16 episodes.

== Synopsis ==
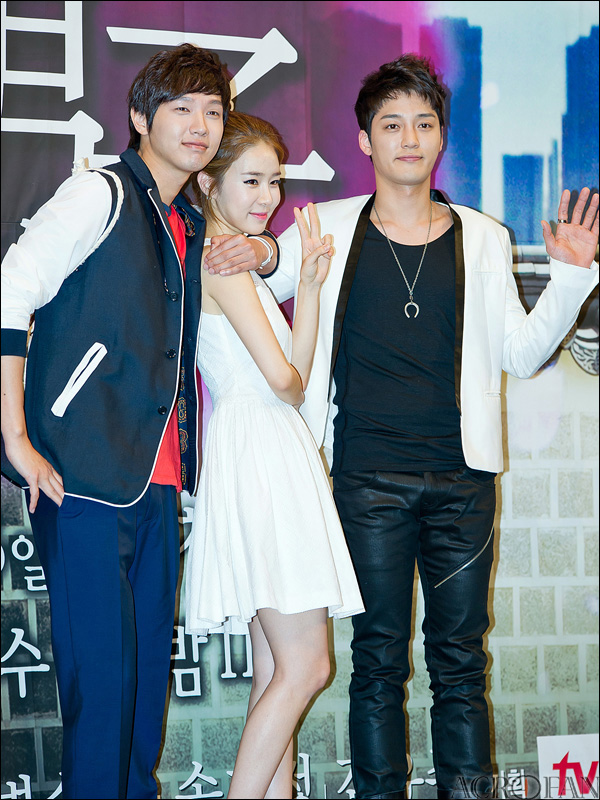
The cast at the press conference in April 2012. Left to Right: Ji Hyun-woo, Yoo In-na and Kim Jin-woo.

On the year 1694, Joseon Dynasty: Kim Bung-do (Ji Hyun-woo) is a noble-born scholar and his family's sole survivor after they were massacred in a conspiracy. Kim Bung-do supports the reinstatement of Queen Inhyeon, who was deposed due to scheming by royal concubine Lady Jang.

On the year 2012, modern-day Seoul: Choi Hee-jin (Yoo In-na), an unsuccessful actress, lands her big break when she is cast as Queen Inhyeon in the television drama "New Jang Heebin". Due to a mysterious talisman, Kim Bung-do time travels to 2012, where he crosses paths with Choi Hee-jin and falls in love.

== Cast ==
=== Main ===
- Ji Hyun-woo as Kim Bung-do
- Yoo In-na as Choi Hee-jin
- Kim Jin-woo as Han Dong-min, Hee-jin's ex-boyfriend
- Ga Deuk-hee as Jo Soo-kyung, Hee-jin's friend and manager

=== Supporting ===
- Jin Ye-sol as Yoon-wol
- Um Hyo-sup as Minister Min Ahm
- Lee Kwan-hoon as Ja-soo
- Ji Nam-hyuk as Han-dong
- Park Young-rin as Yoon Na-jung
- Jo Dal-hwan as Chun-soo
- Seo Woo-jin as King Sukjong
- Kim Hae-in as Queen Inhyeon
- Choi Woo-ri as Jang Hee-bin
- Kim Won-hae as Eunuch Hong
- Kim Kyul as Young Myung
- Oh Hee-joon as Officer Hong's soldier
- Yang Jae-jee
- Park Pal-young
- Seo Ho-chul

== Production ==
One of the filming locations was Gwanghwamun Plaza, where the two lead characters, Kim Boong-do and Choi Hee-jin share a kiss dubbed the 'Gwanghwamun kiss' against the backdrop of Gwanghwamun.

== Original soundtrack ==
Queen and I OST
No.	Title	Lyrics	Music	Artist	Length
1.	"인현왕후의 남자 - Title" (Queen and I - Title)		Kim Hee-jin, Nam Hye-seung
2.	"같은 하늘 다른 시간에" (Same Sky, Different Time)	Jo Hyun-joo	Kim Do-hyeong	Joo Hee of 8Eight	03:40
3.	"꼭 한번" (Just Once)	Young Jae, Min Yeon-jae	Young Jae, Bae Gi-pil	Young Jae of 4Men	03:35
4.	"그대가 왔죠" (You Came)	Jung Ho-gyu, Pabaki, Mr.Sync	Jung Ho-gyu, Pabaki, Mr.Sync	Kim So-jung	03:10
5.	"지금 만나러 갑니다" (I'm Going to Meet You)	노는 어린이	노는 어린이	Deok Hwan	03:18
6.	"시간을 넘어" (Leap Through Time)		Kim Hee-jin, Nam Hye-seung	이크거북
7.	"같은 하늘 다른 시간에 (Inst.)" (Same Sky, Different Time (Inst.))		Kim Do-hyeong		03:40
8.	"꼭 한번 (Inst.)" (Just Once (Inst.))		Young Jae, Bae Gi-pil		03:35
9.	"내 남자, 김붕도" (My Man, Kim Boong-do)		Nam Hye-seung, Park Sang-hee	이크거북

== Awards and nominations ==
Year	Award	Category	Recipient	Result
2012	1st K-Drama Star Awards	Rising Star Award	Yoo In-na	Won
2016	tvN10 Awards	Romantic-Comedy Queen	Yoo In-na	Nominated

== Remake ==
A Chinese remake of the series, titled Love Weaves Through a Millennium, aired in 2015.
