= Lee Jong-suk =

South Korean model and actor (born 1989)

- Lee in 2026
- Born: 14 September 1989 (age 37); Yongin, South Korea
- Education: Yangjae High School; Konkuk University
- Occupations: Actor; model
- Years active: 2005–present
- Agent: Ace Factory
- Height: 186 cm (6 ft 1 in)

Korean name
- Hangul: 이종석
- RR: I Jongseok
- MR: I Chongsŏk

Signature
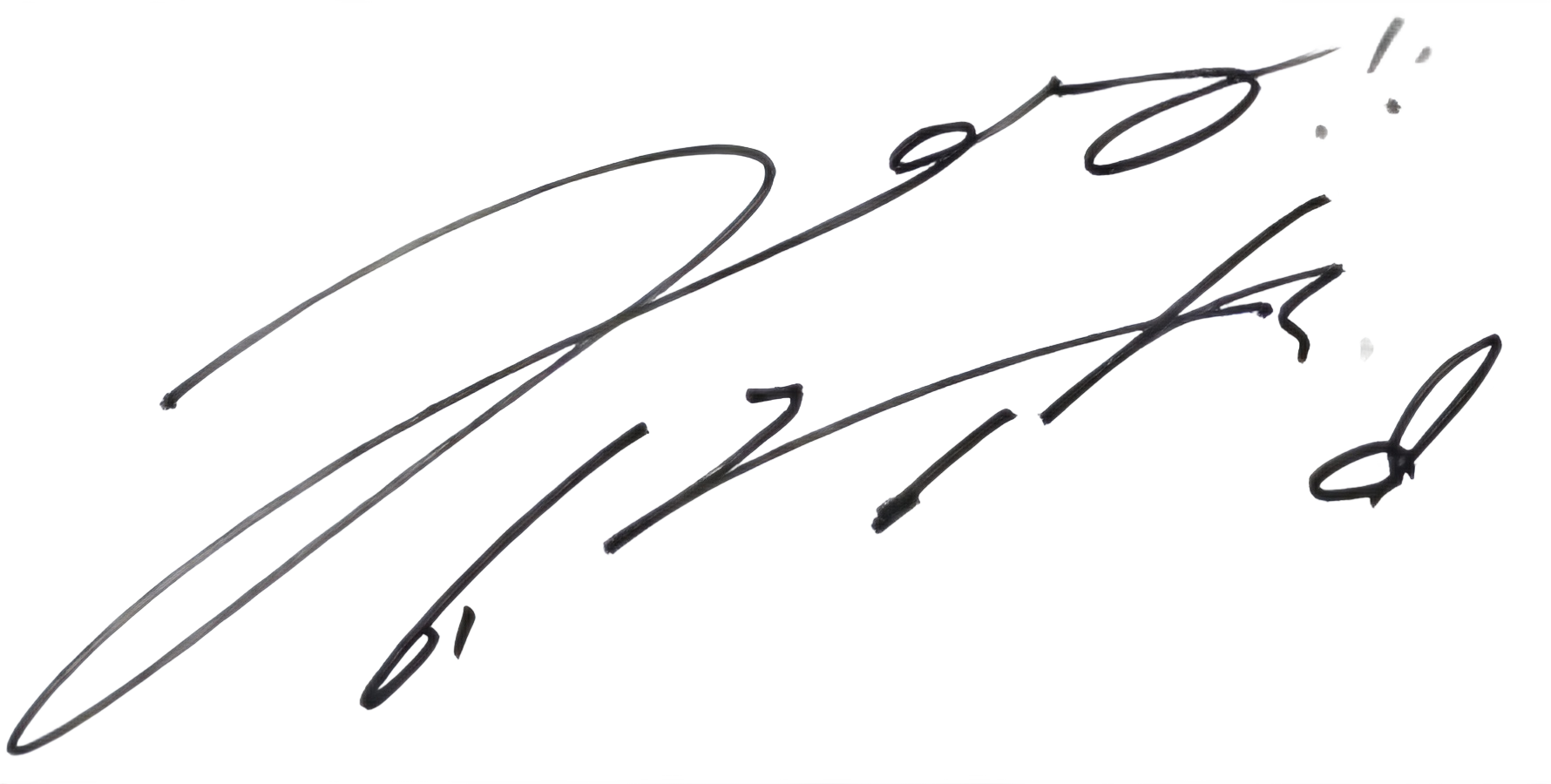

Lee Jong-suk (Korean: 이종석, born 14 September 1989) is a South Korean actor and model. He debuted in 2005 as a runway model and gained recognition as an actor with television series School 2013 (2012) and I Can Hear Your Voice (2013). He received further prominence with dramas Doctor Stranger (2014), Pinocchio (2014), W (2016), While You Were Sleeping (2017), Big Mouth (2022) Law and the City (2025), and The Remarried Empress (2026).

== Education ==
Lee majored in Professional Motion Pictures and Art at Konkuk University and graduated from the university in 2016.

== Career ==
=== 2005–2010: Beginnings ===
At 15, Lee began his modelling career at the Seoul Collection walkway in 2005, making him the youngest male model to debut in the Seoul Collection program at Seoul Fashion Week. Since then,, he has walked in a number of fashion shows. Lee trained as an idol group member for three months, and had signed on with an agency to debut. However, he quit after the agency broke their promise of debuting him as an actor. He took part in a selection for actors at SBS TV station when he was in middle school. In 2010, Lee made his official acting debut in the South Korean TV series Prosecutor Princess. He also made his big-screen debut in the horror movie Ghost.

=== 2011–2013: Rising popularity and breakthrough ===
Lee started to gain recognition following his supporting role in the hit drama Secret Garden where he played a talented young composer with a surly attitude and a forbidden crush on the second male lead. In 2011, he appeared in MBC's sitcom High Kick Season 3 where he gained further popularity. Lee also co-starred in the film R2B: Return to Base in 2012, a loose remake of the critically acclaimed 1986 film Top Gun.

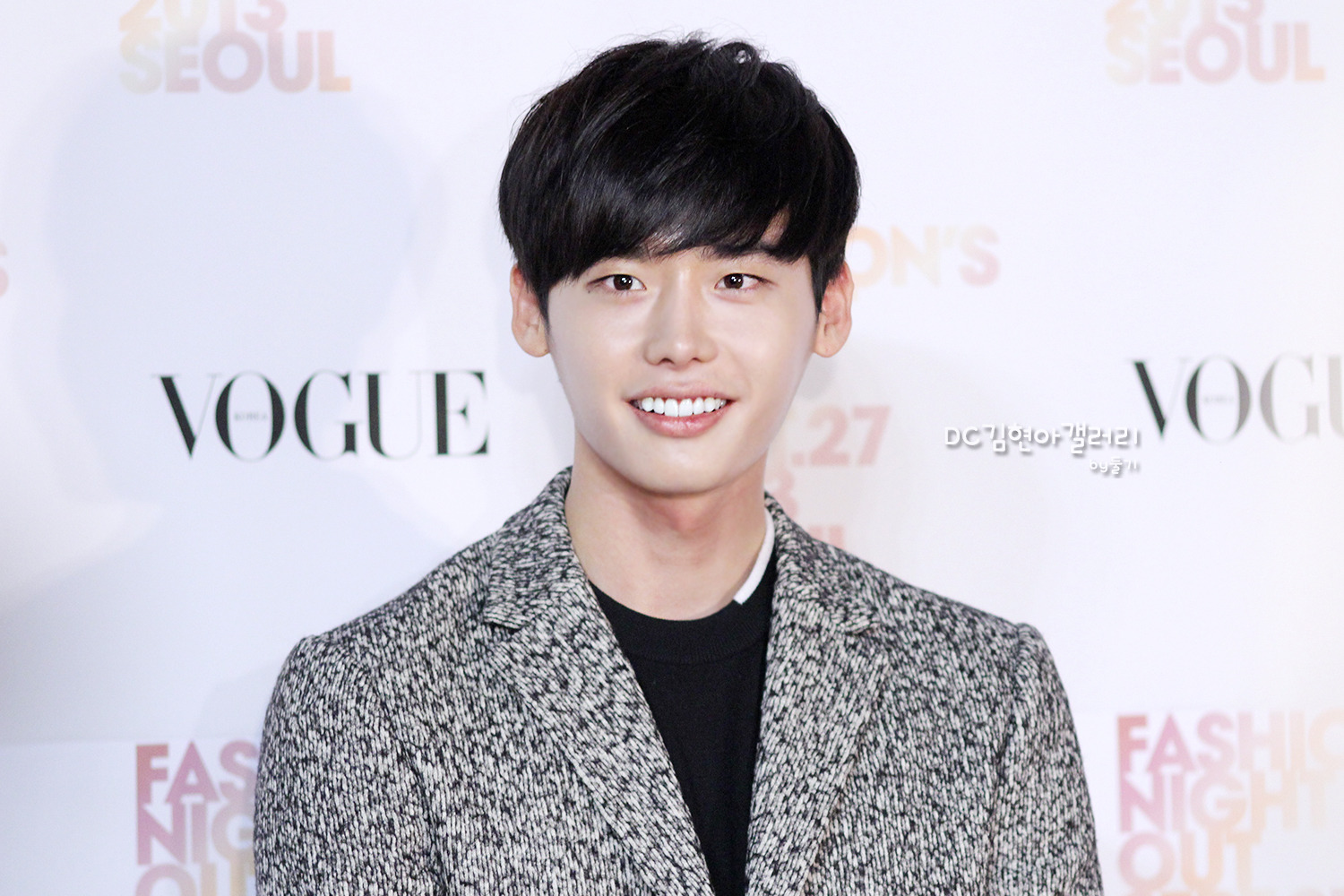
Lee at Vogue Fashion's Night Out, 2013

Lee's breakout role came as a high school student in the teen drama School 2013. He received his first acting award for the role at the 2012 KBS Drama Awards under the category Best New Actor. He also ranked fifth according to a survey entitled 'Actors Who Lit Up 2013' by Gallup Korea.

Following the success of School 2013, Lee starred in the critically acclaimed drama series I Can Hear Your Voice with Lee Bo-young. He played Park Soo-ha, an intelligent young man who can read minds. Originally slated for 16 episodes, the drama was extended by two episodes due to its successful ratings. He received the Excellence Award in the male category at the Korea Drama Awards for his performance. Lee then starred in the sports film No Breathing and had a supporting role in the box office hit The Face Reader.

=== 2014–2018: Mainstream popularity ===
In 2014, he starred in teen romantic comedy Hot Young Bloods, playing a cheesy womanizer. Lee then starred in hit medical drama Doctor Stranger, playing a North Korean defector who works as a doctor in South Korea. The drama was a success in China, gaining 400 million views. Lee next starred in Pinocchio opposite actress Park Shin-hye, and played the protagonist Choi Dal-po, a first year reporter at a broadcasting company who struggles with the idea of justice and truth in a world where everyone wants to hide the facts. Pinocchio was another hit, with a reported revenue of 6.2 billion won (US$5.62 million) for broadcasting rights in just one year. Lee's performances in the dramas Doctor Stranger and Pinocchio earned him acting accolades, including the Male Top Excellence Award at the 8th Korea Drama Awards. He also became the youngest actor to win the Best Actor award at the 27th Grimae Awards, chosen by television cinematographers.

Lee then embarked on an Asia fan-meeting tour, and released a photobook titled 2014–2015 Asia Tour Story ~With~, comprising photos taken of Lee's meetings with fans in seven Asian cities during the nine-month tour. Lee was also cast in his first Chinese drama entitled Jade Lovers alongside actress Zheng Shuang. The drama, filmed in Shanghai, is described as a fantasy romance series set in the 1930s. Due to Lee's success in China, a wax figure of him went on display in Hong Kong's Madame Tussauds, which the actor unveiled himself in a ceremony. In December 2015, Lee left his previous agency Wellmade Yedang and signed an exclusive contract with YG Entertainment on 10 May 2016.

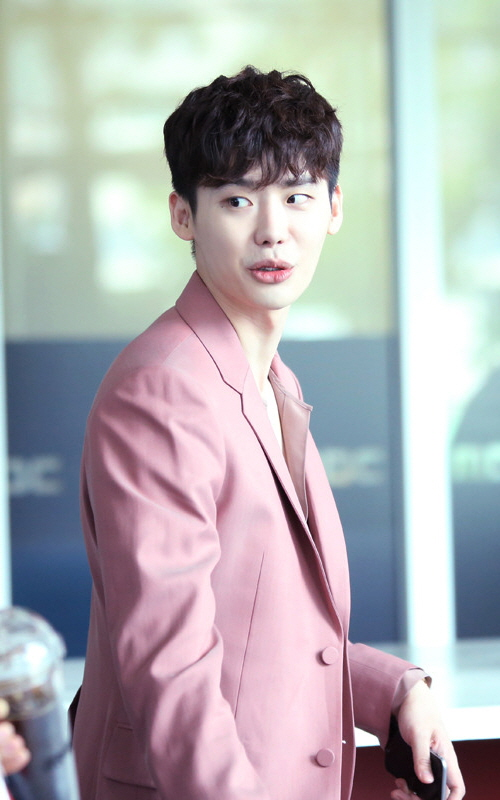
Lee at W press conference, August 2016

In July 2016, Lee returned to the Korean small screen with MBC's fantasy thriller W alongside Han Hyo-joo. The drama topped popularity charts in Korea and Lee won the Daesang (Note: A Daesang (Korean: 대상), which translates to "Grand Prize", is the highest honor given out at South Korean award ceremonies.) (Grand Prize) at the year-end MBC Drama Awards. The same year, he co-starred in the promotional web drama 7 First Kisses for Lotte Duty Free. In 2017, Lee starred in the crime film VIP, marking his first lead role as a villain. Lee then starred in the supernatural-procedural drama While You Were Sleeping alongside Bae Suzy in September. In July of the same year, Lee was appointed Goodwill Ambassador for Korean tourism by the Korea Tourism Organization. The organization also released promotional videos featuring the actor, titled "8 Episodes of Korea", which focused on tourist spots in 10 different regions including Seoul, Gyeonggi, Gangwon, Jeju and Gyeongju.

In 2018, Lee was cast in the three-episode drama The Hymn of Death, a remake of the 1991 film Death Song. Lee signed with new management agency YNK Entertainment once his contract with YG Entertainment ended on 31 March 2018, but terminated his contract five months later. and established his own agency "A-man Project". In 2019, he starred in his first romantic comedy drama Romance Is a Bonus Book alongside Lee Na-young.

=== 2019–present: Military enlistment and comeback ===
In 2021, after finishing his military duty, he made a comeback with a cameo in The Witch : Part 2. The Other One. Lee later confirmed for the official film Decibel alongside Kim Rae-won, Lee Sang-hee, and Cha Eun-woo. This will be the second time Lee will appear as the villain in a movie. With VIP being the first movie he is the villain. Later in September 2021, Lee confirmed the MBC drama Big Mouth with Im Yoon-ah, coming back three years after his discharge from the military. It aired in 2022.

== Personal life ==
Lee is best friends with fellow model-actor and School 2013 co-star Kim Woo-bin, whom he has known since their modeling days. He was the owner of the dining cafe, 89Mansion. The cafe closed permanently on 14 September 2020 due to effects of the COVID-19 pandemic. From December 2022 to July 2026, Lee was in a relationship with singer-actress IU.

=== Military enlistment ===
Lee began his mandatory military service on 8 March 2019. Lee was deemed unfit to enlist as an active duty soldier as a result of suffering a car accident when he was 16 and tearing his anterior cruciate ligament. Therefore, he was confirmed to work as a public service officer, and was expected to be discharged on 31 December 2020. He was discharged on 2 January 2021.

=== Philanthropy ===
On 7 March 2022, Lee donated 100 million won to the Hope Bridge Disaster Relief Association to help the victims of the massive wildfire that started in Uljin, Gyeongbuk and spread to Samcheok, Gangwon.

== Filmography ==
Selected filmography

- School 2013 (2012)
- I Can Hear Your Voice (2013)
- Pinocchio (2014)
- W (2016)
- While You Were Sleeping (2017)
- Big Mouth (2022)

== Discography ==
=== Soundtrack appearances ===
Title	Year	Album
"Come to Me" (내게 와)	2017	While You Were Sleeping OST
"Would You Know" (그대는 알까요)	2017	While You Were Sleeping OST

== Accolades ==
=== Awards and nominations ===
Name of the award ceremony, year presented, category, nominee of the award, and the result of the nomination
Award ceremony	Year	Category	Nominee / Work	Result	Ref.
A-Awards	2022	A-Awards – Charisma	Big Mouth	Won	
APAN Star Awards	2013	Excellence Award, Actor	I Can Hear Your Voice	Nominated	
APAN Star Awards	2013	Best Couple Award	Lee Jong-suk with Lee Bo-young; I Can Hear Your Voice	Won	
APAN Star Awards	2016	Top Excellence Award, Actor in a Miniseries	W	Nominated	
APAN Star Awards	2016	Best Couple Award	Lee Jong-suk with Han Hyo-joo; W	Nominated	
APAN Star Awards	2018	Top Excellence Award, Actor in a Miniseries	While You Were Sleeping	Nominated	
APAN Star Awards	2018	K-Star Award	While You Were Sleeping	Nominated	
Asia Model Awards	2014	Model Star Award	Lee Jong-suk	Won	
Baeksang Arts Awards	2012	Best Male Variety Performer	High Kick: Revenge of the Short Legged	Nominated	
Baeksang Arts Awards	2014	Best Actor – Television	I Can Hear Your Voice	Nominated	
Baeksang Arts Awards	2015	Most Popular Actor – Television	Pinocchio	Won	
Grand Bell Awards	2014	Most Popular Actor	Hot Young Bloods	Nominated	
Grimae Awards	2014	Best Actor	Pinocchio	Won	
KBS Drama Awards	2012	Best New Actor	School 2013	Won	
KBS Drama Awards	2012	Netizen Award, Actor	School 2013	Nominated	
Korea Brand Stars	2015	Grand Prize (Daesang)	Lee Jong-suk	Won	
Korean Culture and Entertainment Awards	2013	Top Excellence Award, Actor	I Can Hear Your Voice	Won	
Korean Culture and Entertainment Awards	2013	Hallyu Grand Award	I Can Hear Your Voice	Won	
Korea Drama Awards	2013	Excellence Award, Actor	I Can Hear Your Voice	Won	
Korea Drama Awards	2013	Best Couple Award	Lee Jong-suk with Lee Bo-young; I Can Hear Your Voice	Won	
Korea Drama Awards	2014	Top Excellence Award, Actor	Doctor Stranger	Nominated	
Korea Drama Awards	2015	Top Excellence Award, Actor	Pinocchio	Won	
MBC Drama Awards	2016	Grand Prize (Daesang)	W	Won	
MBC Drama Awards	2016	Top Excellence Award, Actor in a Miniseries	W	Won	
MBC Drama Awards	2016	Best Couple Award	Lee Jong-suk with Han Hyo-joo; W	Won	
MBC Drama Awards	2022	Grand Prize (Daesang)	Big Mouth	Won	
MBC Drama Awards	2022	Best Couple Award	Lee Jong-suk with Im Yoon-ah; Big Mouth	Won	
Mnet 20's Choice Awards	2012	20's Drama Star – Male	Lee Jong-suk	Nominated	
SBS Drama Awards	2013	Excellence Award, Actor in a Miniseries	I Can Hear Your Voice	Won	
SBS Drama Awards	2013	Netizen Popularity Award	I Can Hear Your Voice	Nominated	
SBS Drama Awards	2013	Top 10 Stars	I Can Hear Your Voice	Won	
SBS Drama Awards	2013	Best Couple Award	Lee Jong-suk with Lee Bo-young; I Can Hear Your Voice	Nominated	
SBS Drama Awards	2014	Top Excellence Award, Actor in a Drama Special	Pinocchio	Nominated	
SBS Drama Awards	2014	SBS Special Award	Pinocchio, Doctor Stranger	Won	
SBS Drama Awards	2014	Netizen Popularity Award	Pinocchio, Doctor Stranger	Nominated	
SBS Drama Awards	2014	Best Couple Award	Lee Jong-suk with Park Shin-hye; Pinocchio	Won	
SBS Drama Awards	2014	Top 10 Stars	Pinocchio, Doctor Stranger	Won	
SBS Drama Awards	2017	Grand Prize (Daesang)	While You Were Sleeping	Nominated	
SBS Drama Awards	2017	Top Excellence Award, Actor in Wednesday-Thursday Drama	While You Were Sleeping	Won	
SBS Drama Awards	2017	Best Couple Award	Lee Jong-suk with Bae Suzy; While You Were Sleeping	Won	
Seoul International Drama Awards	2014	People's Choice Actor	I Can Hear Your Voice	Nominated	
SMART Model Contest	2006	Most Photogenic Award	Lee Jong-suk	Won	
South Korean Superstar Selection Competition	2005	Star of New Advertising Models	Lee Jong-suk	Won	
Style Icon Awards	2011	SIA's Choice Award	Lee Jong-suk	Won	
Style Icon Awards	2013	The 21st Century Gentleman	I Can Hear Your Voice	Won	
Style Icon Awards	2014	Top 10 Style Icons	Lee Jong-suk	Nominated	

=== State honors ===
Name of country, year given, and name of honor
Country or Organization	Year	Honor or Award	Ref.
South Korea (Note: Honors are given at the Korean Popular Culture and Arts Awards, arranged by the Korea Creative Content Agency and hosted by the Ministry of Culture, Sports and Tourism. They are awarded to those who have contributed to the arts and South Korea's pop culture.)	2015	Prime Minister's Commendation	

=== Listicles ===
Name of publisher, year listed, name of listicle, and placement
Publisher	Year	Listicle	Placement	Ref.
Forbes	2015	Korea Power Celebrity 40	12th	
Forbes	2023	Korea Power Celebrity 40	22nd	
