= Baeksang Arts Award for Best Screenplay – Television =

Annual South Korean television award

- Awarded for: Best screenplay of a South Korean series
- Country: South Korea
- Presented by: Baeksang Arts Awards
- Most recent winner: Song Hye-jin; You and Everything Else (2026)
- Website: baeksangartsawards

The Baeksang Arts Award for Best Screenplay – Television (Korean: 백상예술대상 TV부문 극본상; RR: Baeksang Yesul Daesang TV Bumun Geukbonsang) is annually presented at the Baeksang Arts Awards ceremony.

== Winners and nominees ==
Table key
‡	Indicates the winner

=== 1970s ===
Year	Winner and nominees	Television series	Original title	Network
1974 (10th)	Kwak Il-ro ‡	Waves	파도	KBS
1975 (11th)	Lee Eun-seong ‡	Loyalty	충의	KBS
1978 (14th)	Han Un-sa ‡	The Third Ferry	나루터 3대	KBS
1979 (15th)	Lee Sang-hyeon ‡	White Heron	해오라기	TBC

=== 1980s ===
Year	Winner and nominees	Television series	Original title	Network
1980 (16th)	Kim Soo-hyun ‡	A Lonely Affair; Spring Blessing	고독한 관계 입춘대길	TBC; KBS
1981 (17th)	Kim Soo-hyun ‡	Back in the Day	옛날 나 어릴 적에	KBS1
1982 (18th)	Kwak In-haeng ‡	In the Sea	에바다	KBS1
1983 (19th)	Kim Ki-pal ‡	Kim Gap-sun	거부실록 - 공주갑부 김갑순	MBC
1984 (20th)	Lee Eun-sung ‡	Foundation of the Kingdom	개국	KBS1
1985 (21st)	Na Yeon-sook ‡	Ordinary People	보통 사람들	KBS1
1986 (22nd)	Shin Bong-seung ‡	500 Years of Joseon	조선왕조 오백년	MBC
1987 (23rd)	Kim Sang-ryul ‡	Seagull	갈매기	MBC
1989 (25th)	Park Soo-bok ‡	What Happened in Jipo-ri	지포리에서 생긴 일	KBS1

=== 1990s ===
Year	Winner and nominees	Television series	Original title	Network
1990 (26th)	Park Jin-sook ‡	The House with a Deep Yard	마당 깊은 집	MBC
1991 (27th)	Park Jung-ran ‡	Balsam Under the Wool	울밑에 선 봉선화	KBS1
1992 (28th)	Yang Geun-seung ‡	Love on a Jujube Tree	대추나무 사랑걸렸네	KBS1
1993 (29th)	Im Choong ‡	Ilchul Peak	일출봉	MBC
1994 (30th)	Kim Jung-soo ‡	My Mother's Sea	엄마의 바다	MBC
1995 (31st)	Lee Geum-rim ‡	When I Miss You	당신이 그리워질때	KBS1
1995 (31st)	Song Ji-na ‡	Sandglass	모래시계	SBS
1996 (32nd)	Moon Young-nam ‡	Even if the Wind Blows	바람은 불어도	KBS1
1997 (33rd)	Son Young-mok ‡	A Faraway Country	머나먼 나라	KBS2
1998 (34th)	Park Jung-ran ‡	Offspring	새끼	SBS
1999 (35th)	Noh Hee-kyung ‡	Lie	거짓말	KBS2

=== 2000s ===
Year	Winner and nominees	Television series	Original title	Network
2000 (36th)	Jung Sung-joo ‡	Roses and Beansprouts	장미와 콩나물	MBC
2001 (37th)	Kim Soo-hyun ‡	The Aspen Tree	은사시나무	SBS
2001 (37th)	Jung Sung-joo	Mother	아줌마	MBC
2001 (37th)	Oh Soo-yun	Autumn in My Heart	가을동화	KBS2
2002 (38th)	Kim Jung-soo ‡	Her House	그 여자네 집	MBC
2003 (39th)	In Jung-ok ‡	Ruler of Your Own World	네 멋대로 해라	MBC
2003 (39th)	Lee Hwan-kyung	Rustic Period	야인시대	SBS
2004 (40th)	Kim Ki-ho ‡	Something Happened in Bali	발리에서 생긴 일	SBS
2005 (41st)	Kim Eun-sook, Kang Eun-jung ‡	Lovers in Paris	파리의 연인	SBS
2005 (41st)	In Jung-ok	Ireland	아일랜드	MBC
2005 (41st)	Lee Kyung-hee	I'm Sorry, I Love You	미안하다, 사랑한다	KBS2
2006 (42nd)	Kim Do-woo ‡	My Name Is Kim Sam-soon	내 이름은 김삼순	MBC
2006 (42nd)	Lee Jung-sun	Be Strong, Geum-soon!	굳세어라 금순아	MBC
2006 (42nd)	Moon Young-nam	My Rosy Life	장밋빛 인생	KBS2
2007 (43rd)	Jung Hyung-soo ‡ Choi Wan-gyu ‡	Jumong	주몽	MBC
2007 (43rd)	Choi Soon-shik	Please Come Back, Soon-ae	돌아와요 순애씨	SBS
2007 (43rd)	Hong Jung-eun, Hong Mi-ran	Couple or Trouble	환상의 커플	MBC
2007 (43rd)	Lee Han-ho, Jung Sung-hee	Seoul 1945	서울 1945	KBS1
2007 (43rd)	Yoon Sun-joo	Hwang Jini	황진이	KBS2
2008 (44th)	Lee Kyung-hee ‡	Thank You	고맙습니다	MBC
2008 (44th)	Hwang Eun-kyung	New Heart	뉴하트	MBC
2008 (44th)	Jung Yoo-kyung	In-soon Is Pretty	인순이는 예쁘다	KBS2
2008 (44th)	Kim Soo-hyun	My Husband's Woman	내 남자의 여자	SBS
2008 (44th)	Lee Jung-ah	Coffee Prince	커피프린스 1호점	MBC
2009 (45th)	Yoo Hyun-mi ‡	The Scales of Providence	신의 저울	SBS
2009 (45th)	Hong Jin-ah, Hong Ja-ram	Beethoven Virus	베토벤 바이러스	MBC
2009 (45th)	Kim Eun-sook	On Air	온 에어	SBS
2009 (45th)	Kim Soo-hyun	Mom's Dead Upset	엄마가 뿔났다	KBS2
2009 (45th)	Moon Hee-jung	Last Scandal	내 생애 마지막 스캔들	MBC

=== 2010s ===
Year	Winner and nominees	Television series	Original title	Network
2010 (46th)	Chun Sung-il ‡	The Slave Hunters	추노	KBS2
2010 (46th)	Kim Young-hyun, Park Sang-yeon	Queen Seondeok	선덕여왕	MBC
2010 (46th)	Park Ji-eun	Queen of Housewives	내조의 여왕	MBC
2010 (46th)	Shin Jae-won, Lee Ji-hyang, Choi Yi-rang, Lee Jae-yoon	Tamra, the Island	탐나는도다	MBC
2010 (46th)	So Hyun-kyung	Brilliant Legacy	찬란한 유산	SBS
2011 (47th)	Kim Eun-sook ‡	Secret Garden	시크릿 가든	SBS
2011 (47th)	Jang Young-chul	Giant	자이언트	SBS
2011 (47th)	Jung Ha-yeon	Flames of Desire	욕망의 불꽃	MBC
2011 (47th)	Kang Eun-kyung	Bread, Love and Dreams	제빵왕 김탁구	KBS2
2011 (47th)	Kim Gyu-wan	Cinderella's Sister	신데렐라 언니	KBS2
2012 (48th)	Kim Young-hyun, Park Sang-yeon ‡	Deep Rooted Tree	뿌리 깊은 나무	SBS
2012 (48th)	Choi Wan-kyu	Lights and Shadows	빛과 그림자	MBC
2012 (48th)	Hong Mi-ran, Hong Jung-eun	The Greatest Love	최고의 사랑	MBC
2012 (48th)	Jo Jung-joo, Kim Wook	The Princess' Man	공주의 남자	KBS2
2012 (48th)	Yoon Kyung-ah	Brain	브레인	KBS2
2013 (49th)	Park Kyung-soo ‡	The Chaser	추적자	SBS
2013 (49th)	Choi Hee-ra	Golden Time	골든타임	MBC
2013 (49th)	Ha Myung-hee	Can We Get Married?	우리가 결혼할 수 있을까	JTBC
2013 (49th)	Lee Woo-jung	Reply 1997	응답하라 1997	tvN
2013 (49th)	Park Ji-eun	My Husband Got a Family	넝쿨째 굴러온 당신	KBS2
2014 (50th)	Jung Sung-joo ‡	Secret Love Affair	밀회	JTBC
2014 (50th)	Ha Myung-hee	One Warm Word	따뜻한 말 한마디	SBS
2014 (50th)	Park Ji-eun	My Love from the Star	별에서 온 그대	SBS
2014 (50th)	Kim Ji-woo	Don't Look Back: The Legend of Orpheus	상어	KBS2
2014 (50th)	Lee Woo-jung	Reply 1994	응답하라 1994	tvN
2015 (51st)	Park Kyung-soo ‡	Punch	펀치	SBS
2015 (51st)	Jin Soo-wan	Kill Me, Heal Me	킬미, 힐미	MBC
2015 (51st)	Jung Sung-joo	Heard It Through the Grapevine	풍문으로 들었소	SBS
2015 (51st)	Kim Woon-kyung	Steal Heart	유나의 거리	JTBC
2015 (51st)	Noh Hee-kyung	It's Okay, That's Love	괜찮아, 사랑이	SBS
2016 (52nd)	Kim Eun-hee ‡	Signal	시그널	tvN
2016 (52nd)	Kim Eun-sook, Kim Won-seok	Descendants of the Sun	태양의 후예	KBS2
2016 (52nd)	Kim Young-hyun, Park Sang-yeon	Six Flying Dragons	육룡이 나르샤	SBS
2016 (52nd)	Lee Woo-jung	Reply 1988	응답하라 1988	tvN
2016 (52nd)	Yang Hee-seung	Oh My Ghost	오 나의 귀신님	tvN
2017 (53rd)	Noh Hee-kyung ‡	Dear My Friends	디어 마이 프렌즈	tvN
2017 (53rd)	Kim Eun-sook	Guardian: The Lonely and Great God	쓸쓸하고 찬란하神 – 도깨비	tvN
2017 (53rd)	Kang Eun-kyung	Dr. Romantic	낭만닥터 김사부	SBS
2017 (53rd)	Park Hae-young	Another Miss Oh	또! 오해영	tvN
2017 (53rd)	Song Jae-jung	W - Two Worlds	더블유	MBC
2018 (54th)	Lee Soo-yeon ‡	Stranger	비밀의 숲	tvN
2018 (54th)	Baek Mi-kyung	The Lady in Dignity	품위있는 그녀	JTBC
2018 (54th)	Im Sang-choon	Fight for My Way	쌈 마이웨이	KBS2
2018 (54th)	Jung Bo-hoon	Prison Playbook	슬기로운 감빵생활	tvN
2018 (54th)	Jang Seo-kyung	Mother	마더	tvN
2019 (55th)	Park Hae-young ‡	My Mister	나의 아저씨	tvN
2019 (55th)	Lee Nam-kyu, Kim Soo-jin	The Light in Your Eyes	눈이 부시게	JTBC
2019 (55th)	Kim Eun-sook	Mr. Sunshine	미스터 션샤인	tvN
2019 (55th)	Do Hyun-jung	Children of Nobody	붉은 달 푸른 해	MBC
2019 (55th)	Yoo Hyun-mi	Sky Castle	SKY 캐슬	JTBC

=== 2020s ===
Year	Winner and nominees	Television series	Original title	Network
2020 (56th)	Lim Sang-choon ‡	When the Camellia Blooms	동백꽃 필 무렵	KBS2
2020 (56th)	Kim Roo-ri	Hyena	하이에나	SBS
2020 (56th)	Park Ji-eun	Crash Landing on You	사랑의 불시착	tvN
2020 (56th)	Lee Shin-hwa	Hot Stove League	스토브리그	SBS
2020 (56th)	Lee Woo-jung	Hospital Playlist	슬기로운 의사생활	tvN
2021 (57th)	Kim Su-jin ‡	Beyond Evil	괴물	JTBC
2021 (57th)	Kim Eun-jung	My Unfamiliar Family	(아는 건 별로 없지만) 가족입니다	tvN
2021 (57th)	Yoo Jung-hee	Flower of Evil	악의 꽃	tvN
2021 (57th)	Jo Yong	It's Okay to Not Be Okay	사이코지만 괜찮아	tvN
2021 (57th)	Ha Myung-hee	Record of Youth	청춘기록	tvN
2022 (58th)	Kim Min-seok ‡	Juvenile Justice	소년 심판	Netflix
2022 (58th)	Kim Hong-ki, Park Nu-ri, Choi Sung-jin, Yoon Sung-ho	Political Fever	이렇게 된 이상 청와대로 간다	Wavve
2022 (58th)	Baek Mi-kyung	Mine	마인	tvN
2022 (58th)	Lee Na-eun	Our Beloved Summer	그 해 우리는	SBS
2022 (58th)	Hwang Dong-hyuk	Squid Game	오징어 게임	Netflix
2023 (59th)	Park Hae-young ‡	My Liberation Notes	나의 해방일지	JTBC
2023 (59th)	Kim Eun-sook	The Glory	더 글로리	Netflix
2023 (59th)	Moon Ji-won	Extraordinary Attorney Woo	이상한 변호사 우영우	ENA
2023 (59th)	Jeong Seo-kyung	Little Women	작은 아씨들	tvN
2023 (59th)	Hong Jung-eun, Hong Mi-ran	Alchemy of Souls	환혼	tvN
2024 (60th)	Kang Full ‡	Moving	무빙	Disney+
2024 (60th)	Kim Eun-hee	Revenant	악귀	SBS
2024 (60th)	Bae Se-young	The Good Bad Mother	나쁜엄마	JTBC
2024 (60th)	Lee Nam-gyu, Oh Bo-hyun, Kim Da-hee	Daily Dose of Sunshine	정신병동에도 아침이 와요	Netflix
2024 (60th)	Lim Dae-hyung, Jeon Go-woon	LTNS	엘티엔에스	TVING
2025 (61st)	Lim Sang-choon ‡	When Life Gives You Tangerines	폭싹 속았수다	Netflix
2025 (61st)	Kim Jung-min	Family Matters	가족계획	Coupang Play
2025 (61st)	Park Ji-sook	The Tale of Lady Ok	옥씨부인전	JTBC
2025 (61st)	Lee Si-eun	Lovely Runner	선재 업고 튀어	tvN
2025 (61st)	Choi Yu-na	Good Partner	굿파트너	SBS
2026 (62nd)	Song Hye-jin ‡	You and Everything Else	은중과 상연	Netflix
2026 (62nd)	Kwon Jong-gwan	The Price of Confession	자백의 대가	Netflix
2026 (62nd)	Lee Kang	Our Unwritten Seoul	미지의 서울	tvN
2026 (62nd)	Lee Sun	To My Beloved Thief	은애하는 도적님아	KBS2
2026 (62nd)	Chu Song-yeon	The Art of Sarah	레이디 두아	Netflix

== Sources ==
- "Baeksang Arts Awards Nominees and Winners Lists". Naver Movie (in Korean).
- "Baeksang Arts Awards Winners Lists". Baeksang Arts Awards (in Korean).
