= Park Hae-young =

South Korean screenwriter

- Born: 1972 (age 53–54); South Korea
- Occupation: Screenwriter
- Years active: 1998–present
- Organization: Korea Television and Radio Writers Association (KTRWA)
- Agent: Chorokbaem Media

Korean name
- Hangul: 박해영
- RR: Bak Haeyeong
- MR: Pak Haeyŏng

Park Hae-young (Korean: 박해영; born 1972) is a South Korean screenwriter, best known for writing television series Another Miss Oh (2016), My Mister (2018), My Liberation Notes (2022), and We Are All Trying Here (2026).

== Career ==
Park Hae-young began her career as an assistant writer for the SBS TV sitcom LA Arirang. She subsequently wrote for several youth-oriented sitcoms, including March, Golbaengi!, Run, My Mom!, Old Miss Diary, and I Live in Cheongdam-dong.

During the early stages of her career, Park struggled with the comedic requirements of the genre. She noted the difficulty of anticipating what audiences would find amusing and admitted that she did not find her own work personally enjoyable, even when it successfully elicited laughter from others. Upon sharing these concerns with her head writer, she was advised to focus on subjects that brought her personal joy rather than forcing a specific style of humor. Park credited this advice with her decision to persevere in the industry, stating that if she had been forced to follow a rigid formula for comedy, she would not have sustained her passion for writing.

In June 2024, Park was appointed as chairman of the copyright committee of the Korea Television and Radio Writers Association.

== Filmography ==
=== Film ===
Year	Title	Notes	Ref.
2006	Old Miss Diary		
2012	Two Weddings and a Funeral	Co-written with Kim Yoon-shin	

=== Television ===
Year	Title	Network	Notes	Ref.
1998	LA Arirang	SBS	Assistant writer	
1999–2000	March	SBS		
2000–2001	Golbaengi	SBS		
2003–2004	Run, My Mom	KBS2		
2004	Old Miss Diary	KBS2	Co-written with Lee Yong-Geun, Kim Ji-Sun, Kim Soo-Jin, and Park Ran	
2006	90 Days, Time to Love	MBC TV		
2011	Living Among the Rich	JTBC	Co-written with Lee Nam-gyu, Jeon Sang-hyuk, Kim Ji-sun, and Kim Su-jin	
2016	Another Miss Oh	tvN		
2018	My Mister	tvN		
2022	My Liberation Notes	JTBC		
2026	We Are All Trying Here	JTBC		

== Accolades ==
=== Awards and nominations ===
Year	Award ceremony	Category	Nominee / Work	Result	Ref.
2017	53rd Baeksang Arts Awards	Best Screenplay – Television	Another Miss Oh	Nominated	
2018	11th Korea Drama Awards	Best Screenplay	My Mister	Nominated	
2018	31st Korean Broadcasting Writers’ Awards	Writer Award (Drama Division)	My Mister	Won	
2019	55th Baeksang Arts Awards	Best Screenplay – Television	My Mister	Won	
2022	8th APAN Star Awards	Best Screenwriter Award	My Liberation Notes	Nominated	
2022	35th Korean Broadcasting Writers’ Awards	Writer Award (Drama Division)	My Liberation Notes	Won	
2023	59th Baeksang Arts Awards	Best Screenplay – Television	My Liberation Notes	Won	
2026	21st Seoul International Drama Awards	International Competition — Best Screenwriter	We Are All Trying Here	Nominated	

=== State honors ===
Name of country, award ceremony, year given, and name of honor
Country	Award Ceremony	Year	Honor	Ref.
South Korea	Korean Popular Culture and Arts Awards (Note: Honors are given at the Korean Popular Culture and Arts Awards, arranged by the Korea Creative Content Agency and hosted by the Ministry of Culture, Sports and Tourism. They are awarded to those who have contributed to the arts and South Korea's pop culture.)	2021	Presidential Commendation	

=== Listicle ===
Name of publisher, year listed, name of listicle, and placement
Publisher	Year	List	Placement	Ref.
Cine21	2020	22 Writers	Shortlisted	
