= We Are All Trying Here =

2026 South Korean television series

- Promotional poster
- Hangul: 모두가 자신의 무가치함과 싸우고 있다
- Lit.: Everyone Is Fighting Their Own Worthlessness
- RR: Moduga jasinui mugachihamgwa ssaugo itda
- MR: Moduga chasinŭi mugach'ihamgwa ssaugo itta
- Genre: Black comedy; Slice of life; Melodrama; Psychological drama
- Written by: Park Hae-young
- Directed by: Cha Young-hoon
- Starring: Koo Kyo-hwan; Go Youn-jung; Oh Jung-se; Kang Mal-geum; Park Hae-joon; Bae Jong-ok; Han Sun-hwa; Choi Won-young
- Music by: Gaemi
- Opening theme: Untitled_08 by Damons Year
- Country of origin: South Korea
- Original language: Korean
- No. of episodes: 12

Production
- Running time: 70 minutes
- Production companies: Studio Phoenix; SLL; Studio Flow

Original release
- Network: JTBC
- Release: April 18 – May 24, 2026

We Are All Trying Here (Korean: 모두가 자신의 무가치함과 싸우고 있다) is a 2026 South Korean closely observed black comedic television series of the joys and struggles of the Korean film industry written by Park Hae-young, directed by Cha Young-hoon, and starring Koo Kyo-hwan, Go Youn-jung, Oh Jung-se, Kang Mal-geum, Park Hae-joon, Bae Jong-ok, Han Sun-hwa, and Choi Won-young. The series tells the story of people who are struggling with envy and jealousy as they search for their own peace. It aired on JTBC from April 18, to May 24, 2026, every Saturday at 22:40 (KST) and Sunday at 22:30 (KST). It is also available for streaming on Netflix in selected regions.

== Synopsis ==
The "Group of Eight" is a gang of filmmaker friends who met as juniors and seniors in their university film club. They've since built successful careers in the industry—all except Hwang Dong-man. An aspiring director who hasn't debuted in twenty years. To mask it, he overcompensates by dominating conversations and lobbing harsh critiques at everyone. He tries to pass as a mentor, but his constant chatter wears people down. This behavior causes his friends to become frustrated with him. Despite Hwang's struggles with his perceived failure, his friends continue to support him.

== Cast and characters ==
=== Main ===
- Koo Kyo-hwan as Hwang Dong-man

Among the eight members of the film club, he alone has not debuted and has been preparing for his directorial debut for 20 years. The other members he started with are later successful film directors and producers. But Dong-man is still in the same place. Then, he meets an overwhelmed producer, Byeon Eun-ah, who helps him rediscover his self-worth.

- Go Youn-jung as Byeon Eun-ah
  - Han Si-a as young Eun-ah

The production director of Choi Film. Nicknamed "Dokki (Axe)" for her brutal script critiques, Eun-ah seems unshakably composed in every situation. Underneath, she battles her own trauma and often suffers from emotional overload.

- Oh Jung-se as Park Gyeong-se

A successful director of Kopark Film with at least five films released worldwide, he is also a member of the "Group of Eight", a well-known film industry gathering. Though technically an adult, he remains unfinished, still growing into himself. His success looks complete, yet he strives relentlessly to validate his worth, pushing upward or bracing against a fall. He maintains a childlike antagonism toward Dong-man while harboring a deep inferiority complex toward him.

- Kang Mal-geum as Ko Hye-jin

Gyeong-se's wife, who is the CEO of Kopark Film. She began her career as a journalist but quit the film industry after growing to hate digging into other people's tragedies. The "Group of Eight" drains her—not just Dong-man, whose reputation for trouble precedes him—but her own husband, too, a man ruled by his inferiority complex.

- Park Hae-joon as Hwang Jin-man

Dong-man's older brother, who is a talented writer. He won a literary contest with a poem out of nowhere. After an unexpected win in a poetry contest, he quit his job. Unsure if he could live as a writer, he entered graduate school to become a professor and write poetry for the rest of his life—but nothing went as planned. Now he just tries to manage his unstable life, getting through each day with the help of alcohol.

- Bae Jong-ok as Oh Jeong-hee

A top actress. When acting, she forgets everything, enters another world, becomes someone else, and escapes her dark past.

- Han Sun-hwa as Jang Mi-ran

A top movie star, she is Jeong-hee's stepdaughter after her remarriage and the female lead in Gyeong-se's fifth film. Her status ranks just below Jeong-hee's, and she has trouble keeping the right social distance. On camera, she and Jeong-hee play the most devoted mother and daughter. Off camera, they turn icy toward each other.

- Choi Won-young as Choi Dong-hyun

CEO of the film production company Choi Film. He believes people exist in a hierarchy and wants to cut out anyone he sees as incompetent.

=== Supporting ===
- Jeon Bae-soo as Park Young-soo
- Shim Hee-seop as Lee Jun-hwan
- Park Ye-ni as Choi Hyo-jin
- Bae Myung-jin as Lee Gi-ri
- Jo Min-kook as Woo Seung-tae
- Yeon Woon-kyung as Ga Su-ja

Eun-ah's grandmother

- Kim Jong-hoon as Ma Jae-young, Eun-ah abusive ex boyfriend and filmmaker
- Park Soo-young as Representative Park
- Kim So-yul as Sae-bom
- Jo Soo-yeon as Im Na-young

=== Special appearances ===
- Sung Dong-il as Noh Gang-sik

Top actor

- Kim Dong-wook as Jeong-min

Gang-sik's junior

== Production ==
=== Development ===
Cha Young-hoon, who helmed When the Camellia Blooms (2019), and Welcome to Samdal-ri (2023–2024), was attached to direct. The script is written by Park Hae-young, who previously wrote My Mister (2018), and the production is handled by Studio Phoenix, SLL, and Studio Flow.

=== Casting ===
In April 2025, Koo Kyo-hwan, Go Youn-jung, Kang Mal-geum, Oh Jung-se were reportedly cast to lead the series. Han Sun-hwa was cast in September 2025, and Park Hae-joon was reportedly considering it.

JTBC confirmed Koo Kyo-hwan, Go Youn-jung, Oh Jung-se, Kang Mal-geum, Park Hae-joon, Bae Jong-ok, Han Sun-hwa, and Choi Won-young as the principal cast of the series through its official website.

=== Filming ===
Principal photography began in October 2025.

== Release ==
We Are All Trying Here premiered on JTBC on April 18, 2026, and aired every Saturday and Sunday. It is also available for streaming on Netflix.

== Viewership ==
We Are All Trying Here : South Korea viewers per episode (thousands)

Season	Episode number												Average
Season	1	2	3	4	5	6	7	8	9	10	11	12	Average
1	539	528	553	615	636	735	607	892	870	987	1001	1316	773

Source: Audience measurement performed nationwide by Nielsen Korea.

Average TV viewership ratings
Ep.	Original broadcast date	Average audience share (Nielsen Korea)	
Ep.	Original broadcast date	Nationwide	Seoul
1	April 18, 2026	2.173% (2nd)	2.481% (1st)
2	April 19, 2026	2.239% (2nd)	2.834% (1st)
3	April 25, 2026	2.147% (1st)	2.540% (1st)
4	April 26, 2026	2.441% (1st)	3.014% (1st)
5	May 2, 2026	2.467% (1st)	2.708% (1st)
6	May 3, 2026	2.901% (1st)	3.396% (1st)
7	May 9, 2026	2.565% (1st)	3.079% (1st)
8	May 10, 2026	3.869% (1st)	4.535% (1st)
9	May 16, 2026	3.279% (1st)	3.421% (1st)
10	May 17, 2026	4.270% (1st)	5.093% (1st)
11	May 23, 2026	4.067% (1st)	4.476% (1st)
12	May 24, 2026	5.292% (1st)	5.957% (1st)
Average		3.143%	3.628%
In the table above, the blue numbers represent the lowest ratings and the red numbers represent the highest ratings.; This drama aired on a cable channel/pay TV which normally has a relatively smaller audience compared to free-to-air TV/public broadcasters (KBS, SBS, MBC, and EBS).

== Accolades ==
Name of the award ceremony, year presented, category, nominee of the award, and the result of the nomination
Award ceremony	Year	Category	Nominee	Result	Ref.
Bechdel Day	2026	Bechdel Choice 10 — Series	We Are All Trying Here	Won	
Daejeon Special Effects Film Festival (DFX OTT Awards)	2026	Excellence Award in Acting	Oh Jung-se	Won	
Korea Drama Awards	2026	Best Drama	We Are All Trying Here	Won	
Seoul International Drama Awards	2026	International Competition — Best Miniseries	We Are All Trying Here	Nominated	
Seoul International Drama Awards	2026	International Competition — Best Screenwriter	Park Hae-young	Nominated	
Seoul International Drama Awards	2026	International Competition — Best Actor	Koo Kyo-hwan	Nominated	
Seoul International Drama Awards	2026	International Competition — Best Actress	Go Youn-jung	Nominated	
Seoul International Drama Awards	2026	Outstanding Korean Drama	We Are All Trying Here	Won	
Seoul International Drama Awards	2026	Outstanding Korean Actor	Koo Kyo-hwan	Won	
