= Good Data Corporation =

South Korean data analytics company

- Native name: 굿데이터코퍼레이션
- Formerly: Cherry Picker Co., Ltd
- Type: Private
- Industry: Entertainment
- Founded: January 1, 2015; 11 years ago
- Headquarters: Seoul, South Korea
- Area served: South Korea
- Key people: Won Soon-woo (CEO)
- Services: Data analytic

Good Data Corporation (Korean: 굿데이터코퍼레이션) is a South Korean big data analytics company established in 2013 as Cherry Picker Co., Ltd. It was rebranded as Good Data Corporation in 2015.

Since 2015, the company has specialized in analyzing big data related to K‑content, including TV topicality for both dramas and non-drama programs such as entertainment, current affairs, and liberal arts shows. Since 2023, its results have been published weekly on its own platform, Fundex portal, and the company has also presented the annual FUNdex Awards starting that same year.

== History ==
Good Data Corporation was established in 2013 as Cherry Picker Co., Ltd. The CEO, Won Soon-woo, is CEO and Chief Researcher. He holds degrees from the Department of Journalism and Broadcasting and the Graduate School of Journalism at Korea University.

The company launched its key services starting in 2014, debuting its online public opinion analysis service, Good Data, alongside the beta version of its broadcast program analysis tool, Good Data M. The following year, the company announced the Korean TV program online public opinion evaluation index report and subsequently rebranded as Good Data Corporation. In 2015, it began publishing the Weekly Online TV Evaluation Report.

Between 2017 and 2022, Good Data was actively involved in public analysis projects. In 2017, it conducted a big data survey for the presidential election in collaboration with Maeil Business Newspaper. From 2017 to 2022, the company planned and operated the Korea Communications Commission's public site, RACOI (Value Information Analysis System). In 2019, it released search response survey results.

Major service expansions occurred from 2020 to 2021: Good Data launched NewsClee, a broadcast news clip response survey; began surveying OTT original programs; and opened the TVR platform. In 2021, it conducted an integrated TV-OTT K-content topicality survey and commenced the MakeNew joint AI learning data construction service.

In March 2022, the company announced FUNdex (Fun+Index), a proprietary drama fun intensity index. That same year, Good Data collaborated with the Korean Advertising and PR Society for a seminar on "Development of FUNdex for Changes in Digital Media Viewing Environment and Rediscovery of Content Value," held on July 29, 2022. The FUNdex platform was officially opened in 2023. In December 2023, Good Data hosted the inaugural FUNdex Awards online. This award recognized outstanding dramas and non-drama programs (including entertainment, current affairs, and liberal arts) from both television and OTT, with winners chosen solely based on data metrics from the platform.

In 2024, Good Data participated in the Busan Contents Market. That year, the 2024 FUNdex Awards were held for the first time as an offline ceremony at the Megazone Industry Academia Research Center Auditorium in Gwacheon Knowledge Information Town on December 19, 2024. The event was organized by Good Data Corporation and sponsored by Megazone Cloud and the advertising agency Pentacle. The ceremony was also broadcast live online, recording 1,000 concurrent viewers and achieving a cumulative 12,000 video views.

On May 22, 2025, Good Data signed a memorandum of understanding (MoU) with the Korea Advertisers Association at The Plaza Hotel in Jung-gu, Seoul, focusing on the analysis of advertising effectiveness for content across TV and streaming services.

== Services ==
Good Data specializes in analyzing big data related to K-content, including topicality surveys for both dramas and non-drama programs (entertainment, current affairs, and liberal arts).

The corporation's core services center on content analytics. Services Offered:

- K-Content Topicality Survey: Analyzes online public opinion regarding South Korea domestically produced TV-OTT content and performers (STARs) and announces the results as a topicality index.
- Micro Meta Information: Developed as necessary data for personalized content selection services and new product development, responding to increasingly specific consumer demands.
- Fun-Index (Fx): Developed this index to provide qualitative assessments of content, which complements quantitative metrics (viewership, consumption) needed for advertising effectiveness.
- Fundex: Recommends the most interesting content through Fx analysis across six data types: viewership, topicality, performer topicality, media attention, clip views, and search responsiveness.
- Search Respond: Analyzes search responses to content generated on the portal site demographically and provides the results.
- AI Data Set: Provides data collection, refinement, and labeling services for building AI learning data across various domains (e.g., facial recognition, road safety facilities, sports, pets, text, port facilities, clothing).

== K-Content Topicality Survey ==
=== Online integrated issue power of K-content ===
Good Data's 'TV Popularity Evaluation' (굿데이터의 'TV 화제성 평가') focused on analyzing online broadcast content-related posts. The survey targets programs on 5 terrestrial channels, 21 cable channels, and 4 comprehensive channels. It looks at not only current programs but also reactions to upcoming broadcasts, broadcasting station popularity rates, and evaluations of new programs.

Online Integrated Issue Power of K-Contents, also known as K-Content Online BuzzWorthiness (Korean: TV–OTT 화제성 Top10) is a metric that measures the buzzworthiness of Korean content across various platforms. It is released weekly on Tuesdays. It assesses TV and OTT (Over-The-Top) content, including both drama and non-drama programs, as well as the content itself and its performers. First released in 2015, the initial version of this research was called the 'Weekly Online TV Evaluation Report'.

=== Top 10 TV–OTT shows by search popularity ===
Top 10 TV–OTT Shows by Search Popularity (Korean: TV–OTT 검색 반응 TOP 10) is a weekly ranking of K-content based on search keywords. The company initiated this research in 2019, with the first weekly results being released in March 2020.

== Ten years of TV-OTT drama cast topicality (buzz-worthiness) ==
In a report, Good Data Corporation released a comprehensive analysis of TV drama cast topicality (buzz-worthiness). It is presented in two main tables: one ranks actors by their highest weekly topicality score (buzz-worthiness score), and the other ranks them by the total number of times they achieved the weekly first rank for their performances in each of their drama.

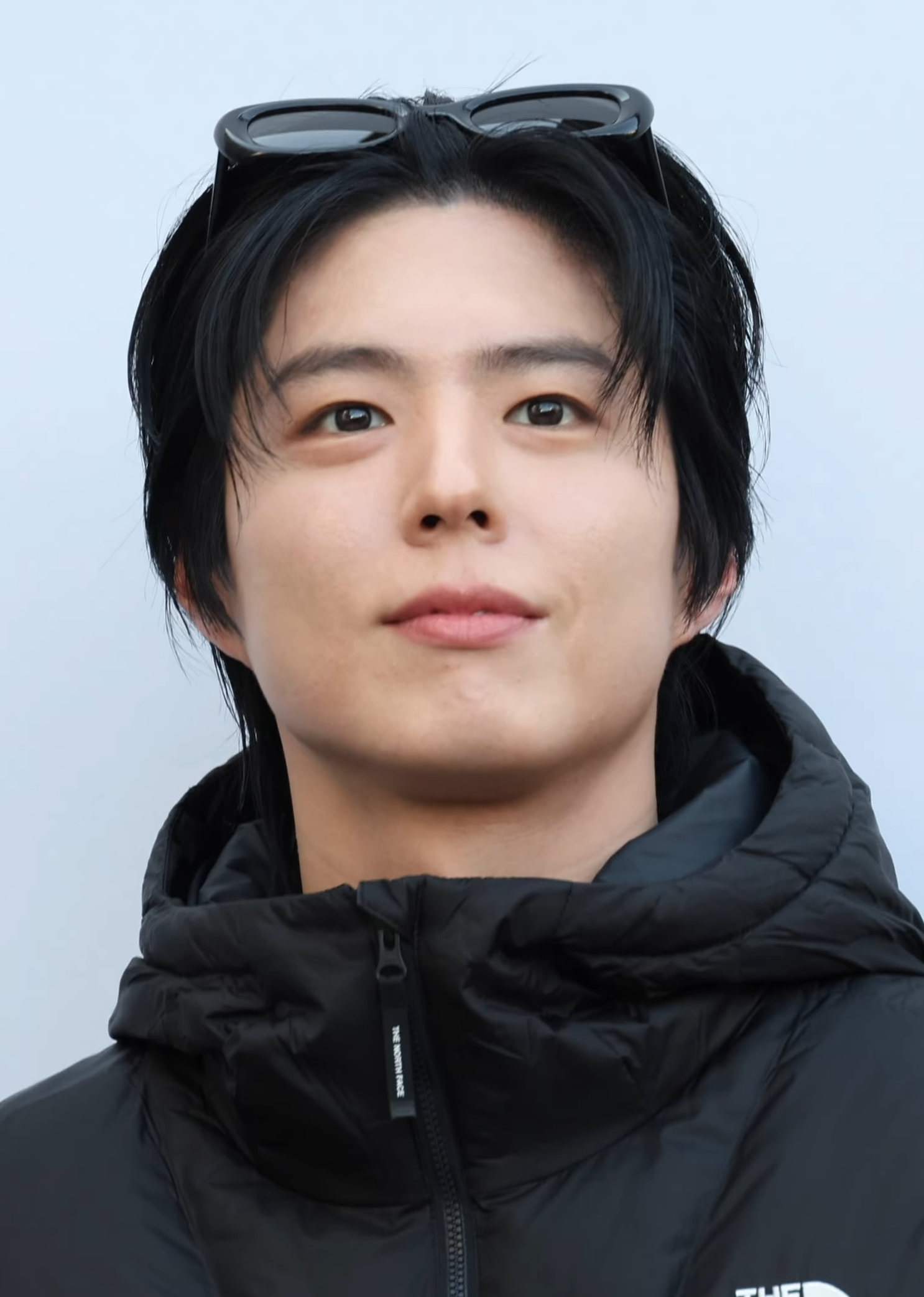
Park Bo-gum's performance in Reply 1988 (2015–2016) achieved the highest weekly topicality score of any drama actor from 2015 to 2024. Furthermore, he holds the record for achieving the most first-rank placements in weekly topicality for an actor, with a cumulative total of 26 times across four of his dramas between 2015 and 2024.

Top 40 Drama Casts with the Highest Weekly Buzzworthiness Scores (2015-2024)
Rank	Artist	Buzz score	Drama	Broadcast year
1	Park Bo-gum	41,093	Reply 1988	2015–2016
2	Lee Hye-ri	40,769	Reply 1988	2015–2016
3	Ryu Jun-yeol	34,404	Reply 1988	2015–2016
4	Gong Yoo	24,986	Guardian: The Lonely and Great God	2016
5	Kim Ji-won	24,522	Queen of Tears	2024
6	Kim Soo-hyun	24,385	Queen of Tears	2024
7	Song Joong-ki	23,904	Reborn Rich	2022
8	Song Joong-ki	23,769	Descendants of the Sun	2016
9	Lee Ji-ah	21,615	Penthouse Season 1	2020
10	Park Min-young	21,901	Marry My Husband	2024
11	Lee Ji-ah	21,916	Penthouse Season 2	2021
12	Lee Se-young	21,089	The Red Sleeve	2021
13	Park Ji-hoon	19,940	Flower Crew: Joseon Marriage Agency	2019
14	Son Ye-jin	19,845	Crash Landing on You	2020
15	Kim Hyun-soo	19,550	Penthouse Season 2	2021
16	Nam Joo-hyuk	19,284	Twenty-Five Twenty-One	2023
17	Kim Hee-ae	18,931	The World of the Married	2020
18	Namkoong Min	18,671	My Dearest	2023
19	Kang Tae-oh	18,562	Extraordinary Attorney Woo	2022
20	IU	18,562	Hotel del Luna	2019
21	Park Eun-bin	17,767	Extraordinary Attorney Woo	2022
22	Hyun Bin	17,657	Crash Landing on You	2020
23	Kim Tae-ri	17,368	Twenty-Five Twenty-One	2023
24	Lee Jun-ho	17,043	The Red Sleeve	2021
25	Ahn Eun-jin	16,530	My Dearest	2023
26	Go Hyun-jung	16,223	Reflection of You	2021
27	Song Hye-kyo	16,052	Descendants of the Sun	2016
28	Jun Ji-hyun	15,516	The Legend of the Blue Sea	2016
29	Eugene	15,469	Penthouse Season 1	2020
30	Kim Go-eun	15,458	Guardian: The Lonely and Great God	2016
31	Jung Hae-in	15,378	Something in the Rain	2018
32	Hwang Jung-eum	14,991	She Was Pretty	2015
33	Namkoong Min	14,880	My Dearest Season 2	2024
34	Kim Seon-ho	14,812	Hometown Cha-Cha-Cha	2021
35	Lee Jun-ho	14,800	King the Land	2023
36	Ong Seong-wu	14,723	At Eighteen	2019
37	Park Bo-gum	14,704	Love in the Moonlight	2016
38	Lee Dong-wook	14,704	Guardian: The Lonely and Great God	2016
39	Park Hae-jin	14,532	Cheese in the Trap	2016
40	Son Suk-ku	14,473	My Liberation Notes	2022

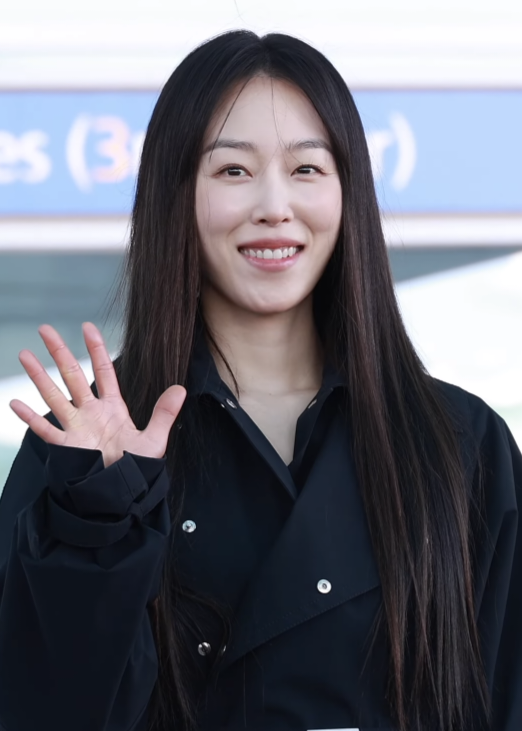
Seo Hyun-jin has achieved a total of 15 cumulative weekly first place wins, ranking 4th overall. She holds the record for the highest number of dramas (six) contributing to these wins: Another Miss Oh (2016), Dr. Romantic (2016–2017), Temperature of Love (2017), The Beauty Inside (2018),You Are My Spring (2021), and Why Her (2022).

Top 40 Drama Casts with the Most First-rank Placements in Weekly Buzz-worthiness (2015–2024)
Rank	Artist	Number of weeks rank first	Number of dramas	Notes
1	Park Bo-gum	26	4	1x for Reply 1988 (2015–2016); 9x for Love in the Moonlight (2016); 8x for Encounter (2018–2019); 8x for Record of Youth (2020)
2	Song Joong-ki	20	4	
3	Son Ye-jin	16	2	
4	Seo Hyun-jin	15	6	
5	Park Min-young	13	4	
6	Kim Tae-ri	13	2	
7	Shin Hye-sun	13	2	
8	Park Bo-young	11	3	
9	IU	10	3	
10	Kim Soo-hyun	9	3	
11	Lee Joon-gi	9	5	
12	Ji Chang-wook	9	2	
13	Lee Hye-ri	8	2	
14	Gong Yoo	8	1	
15	Park Ji-hoon	8	1	
16	Kim Hee-ae	8	1	
17	Namkoong Min	8	2	
18	Hwang Jung-eum	8	1	
19	Park Hae-jin	8	2	
20	Park Seo-joon	8	2	
21	Lee Jun-ho	7	2	
22	Kim Seon-ho	7	1	
23	Lee Jong-suk	7	3	
24	Kim Nam-joo	7	1	
25	Ji Sung	7	3	
26	Lee Se-young	6	1	
27	Jung Hae-in	6	2	
28	Jung Kyung-ho	6	1	
29	Park Yoo-chun	6	1	
30	Bae Suzy	6	2	
31	Lee Je-hoon	6	2	
32	Kim Hee-sun	6	2	
33	Lee Ji-ah	5	2	
34	Nam Joo-hyuk	5	2	
35	Kang Tae-oh	5	1	
36	Park Eun-bin	5	2	
37	Kim Go-eun	5	1	
38	Son Suk-ku	5	1	
39	Kim Da-mi	5	1	
40	Uhm Jung-hwa	5	1	

== Fundex Awards ==
In 2023, Good Data hosted the first Fundex Award online. This award recognized outstanding both dramas and non-drama programs (entertainment, current affairs, and liberal arts), from both television and OTT, with winners chosen solely based on data. The 2024 Fundex Awards were held in an offline ceremony for the first time at the Megazone Industry Academia Research Center Auditorium located in Gwacheon Knowledge Information Town on December 19, 2024. The event was organized by Good Data Corporation and sponsored by Megazone Cloud and the advertising agency Pentacle. This event was also broadcast live online, recording 1,000 concurrent viewers, and the cumulative video views reached 12,000.

=== Grand Prize (Daesang) winners ===
Year	Program	Performer	Ref.
2023	Moving	Lee Jun-ho	
2024	Lovely runner	Byeon Woo-seok	
2025	When Life Gives You Tangerines	Park Bo-gum	
