= My Liberation Notes =

2022 South Korean television series

- Promotional poster
- Hangul: 나의 해방일지
- Hanja: 나의 解放日誌
- Lit.: My Liberation Diary
- RR: Naui haebang ilji
- MR: Naŭi haebang ilchi
- Genre: Slice-of-life
- Written by: Park Hae-young
- Directed by: Kim Seok-yoon
- Starring: Lee Min-ki; Kim Ji-won; Son Suk-ku; Lee El
- Music by: Kim Tae-seong
- Country of origin: South Korea
- Original language: Korean
- No. of episodes: 16

Production
- Production companies: Studio Phoenix; Chorokbaem Media; SLL
- Budget: ₩8 billion

Original release
- Network: JTBC
- Release: April 9 – May 29, 2022

My Liberation Notes (Korean: 나의 해방일지) is a South Korean television series starring Lee Min-ki, Kim Ji-won, Son Suk-ku, and Lee El. It aired on JTBC from April 9 to May 29, 2022, every Saturday and Sunday at 22:30 (KST) for 16 episodes. It is also available for streaming on Netflix in selected regions.

== Synopsis ==
The drama is set in the fictional Seoul suburb of Sanpo, Gyeonggi Province. (Note: Though Sanpo is a fictional village, Gyeonggi Province, where it's based, is a real province. Sanpo is often described as a village near Suwon, a real city in Gyeonggi-do.) My Liberation Notes is about three siblings, (Lee Min-ki, Kim Ji-won and Lee El), all of whom have to make a long commute to Seoul, and a mysterious stranger (Son Suk-ku), who works for their father in the sticks. All of them wish to escape from their dead-end lives amid office politics, gap between rich and poor, and skeletons in their closets.

== Cast ==
=== Main ===
- Lee Min-ki as Yeom Chang-hee

The second of three siblings. An employee at the headquarters of a convenience store franchise.

- Kim Ji-won as Yeom Mi-jeong

The youngest of three siblings. A contract employee at the design department of a credit card company.

- Son Suk-ku as Mr. Gu (Gu Ja-gyeong)

A stranger who works at the sink factory of the Yeom family, who are unaware of his real identity as a club manager.

- Lee El as Yeom Ki-jeong

The eldest of three siblings. An employee at a research company.

=== Supporting ===
==== People around Yeom siblings ====
- Chun Ho-jin as Yeom Je-ho

Father of the three siblings.

- Lee Kyung-seong as Kwak Hye-suk

Mother of the three siblings.

- Jeon Hye-jin as Ji Hyun-ah

A neighborhood friend.

- Han Sang-jo as Oh Doo-hwan

A neighborhood friend.

- Jo Min-kook as Seok Jeong-hoon

A neighborhood friend.

==== People around Yeom Chang-hee ====
- Yang Jun-myung as Lee Min-gyu

Yeom Chang-hee's colleague.

- Choi Bo-young as Jung Ah-reum

Yeom Chang-hee's senior colleague.

- Jeon Soo-jin as Lee Ye-rin

Yeom Chang-hee's ex-girlfriend.

- Oh Min-ae as Byeon Sang-mi

A convenience store owner.

==== People around Yeom Mi-jeong ====
- Lee Ki-woo as Jo Tae-hoon

Yeom Mi-jeong's co-worker.

- Park Soo-young as Park Sang-min

Yeom Mi-jeong's co-worker.

- Lee Ji-hye as So Hyang-gi

Team Leader of Joy Support Center.

- Kong Ye-ji as Han Su-jin

Yeom Mi-jeong's colleague at the design department.

- Lee Ho-young as Choi Jun-ho

Team leader of the design department.

==== Others ====
- Jung Soo-young as Jo Kyung-sun

Jo Tae-hoon's second sister.

- Kim Ro-sa as Jo Hee-sun

Jo Tae-hoon's eldest sister.

- Kang Joo-ha as Jo Yu-rim

Jo Tae-hoon's daughter.

- Kim Woo-hyung as Park Jin-u

Director at Yeom Ki-jeong's company.

- Choi Min-chul as Mr. Baek
- Kim Min-song as Sam-sik
- Lee Shin-seong as Hyeon-jin
- Jung Won-jo as Hyuk-soo

=== Special appearance ===
- Jung Young-joo as woman at restaurant (Ep. 15)

== Production ==
=== Development ===
On September 24, 2021, Chorokbaem Media announced that it had signed a contract with JTBC Studios to produce and supply the series with "8 billion won worth of budget for a total of 16 episodes".

=== Filming ===
On October 5, 2021, it was reported that filming is currently in progress.

== Original soundtrack ==
My Liberation Notes

Soundtrack album by Various Artists
- Released: May 29, 2022
- Genre: Soundtrack
- Languages: Korean; English
- Labels: YG Plus; Studio MaumC; SLL

=== Part 1 ===
Released on April 10, 2022
No.	Title	Lyrics	Music	Artist	Length
1.	"Deeply" (푹)	Hen	Hen; Zist	Hen	3:38
2.	"Deeply" (푹; Inst.)		Hen; Zist		3:38
Total length:					7:16

=== Part 2 ===
Released on April 16, 2022
No.	Title	Lyrics	Music	Artist	Length
1.	"To be together" (함께 할 수 있기를)	Jayins	Jayins; Naiv	Lee Jun-hyung	3:53
2.	"To be together" (함께 할 수 있기를; Inst.)		Jayins; Naiv		3:53
Total length:					7:46

=== Part 3 ===
Released on April 17, 2022
No.	Title	Lyrics	Music	Artist	Length
1.	"Laggard" (느림보)	MaO	Jayins; Naiv	Shin You-me	3:28
2.	"Laggard" (느림보; Inst.)		Jayins; Naiv		3:28
Total length:					7:56

=== Part 4 ===
Released on April 23, 2022
No.	Title	Lyrics	Music	Artist	Length
1.	"That Day" (그런 날)	Hanroro	The Orchard	The Orchard	3:02
2.	"That Day" (그런 날; Inst.)		The Orchard		3:02
Total length:					6:04

=== Part 5 ===
Released on April 24, 2022
No.	Title	Lyrics	Music	Artist	Length
1.	"Be My Birthday"	Naiv	9duck	Ha Hyun-sang	3:14
2.	"Be My Birthday" (Inst.)		9duck		3:14
Total length:					6:28

=== Part 6 ===
Released on April 30, 2022
No.	Title	Lyrics	Music	Artist	Length
1.	"We Sink"	Naiv	Naiv	Sway	3:26
2.	"We Sink" (Inst.)		Naiv		3:26
Total length:					6:52

=== Part 7 ===
Released on May 1, 2022
No.	Title	Lyrics	Music	Artist	Length
1.	"My Spring" (나의 봄은)	Seo Dong-seong	Park Seong-il	Lee Su-hyun	4:12
2.	"My Spring" (나의 봄은; Inst.)		Park Seong-il		4:12
Total length:					8:24

=== Part 8 ===
Released on May 7, 2022
No.	Title	Lyrics	Music	Artist	Length
1.	"Diamond" (다이아몬드)	Hanroro	9duck	9duck	3:04
2.	"Diamond" (다이아몬드; Inst.)		9duck		3:04
Total length:					6:08

=== Part 9 ===
Released on May 8, 2022
No.	Title	Lyrics	Music	Artist	Length
1.	"A Kind Of Confession" (일종의 고백; Female Ver.)	Lee Young-hoon	Lee Young-hoon	Hen	2:58
2.	"A Kind Of Confession" (일종의 고백; Male Ver.)	Lee Young-hoon	Lee Young-hoon	Kwak Jin-eon	3:56
Total length:					6:54

=== Part 10 ===
Released on May 14, 2022
No.	Title	Lyrics	Music	Artist	Length
1.	"I Think I Know" (알 것도 같아)	Hamelli; Moon Siwon	9duck	Hong Isaac	3:24
2.	"I Think I Know" (알 것도 같아; Inst.)		9duck		3:24
Total length:					6:48

=== Part 11 ===
Released on May 15, 2022
No.	Title	Lyrics	Music	Artist	Length
1.	"Here We Are"	MaO	Yoon Yeong-jun	Kim Feel	4:19
2.	"Here We Are" (Inst.)		Yoon Yeong-jun		4:19
Total length:					8:38

== Reception ==
The series drew attention for its dialogues and monologues with deep metaphorical meanings, and realistic and relatable storyline. Novel concepts of "worshipping" (Korean: 추앙; RR: chuang) (Note: Yeom Mi-jeong asks Mr. Gu to 'worship' her since love is not enough for her to feel whole.) and "liberation" (Korean: 해방; RR: haebang) (Note: Yeom Mi-jeong forms a Liberation Club with two other co-workers of her company, in order to be liberated from their mundane daily life.) brought up in the drama were well received by the audience. The series was also praised for its depiction of social pressure that captures the frustrations and challenges of young adult life in Korea.

Pierce Conran writing for South China Morning Post stated "With four intricate and distinct lead characters, terrific dialogue and a bounteous array of intimate moments for all the smaller characters in the cast, My Liberation Notes is far and away the best drama on TV right now" and gave 4.5 stars out of 5. Park Han-na of Korea Herald described the series as "a portrait of a generation trapped by the preconditions set by themselves and the society". Seo Byeong-gi of Herald Business praised the writer Park Hae-young for drama's stimulation of empathy in everyday life. During the broadcast, actor Gong Yoo on Instagram, recommended his fans to watch My Liberation Notes and after the series finished airing he left a review in his fancafe, praising its direction, screenplay and performance of actors.

=== Viewership ===
The series enjoyed modest viewership share: the first episode recorded a nationwide viewership rating of 2.9% and reached the highest rating with the last episode, which recorded the 6.7%. My Liberation Notes topped TV popularity ranking in last four weeks of its eight week run while Son Suk-ku and Kim Ji-won took first and second place respectively in drama performers popularity ranking for five consecutive weeks.

The series debuted at number nine on the Netflix's Global Top 10 for non-English television in the list issued for May 16–22, 2022, ascending to number five in the following week.

My Liberation Notes : South Korea viewers per episode (millions)

Season	Episode number																Average
Season	1	2	3	4	5	6	7	8	9	10	11	12	13	14	15	16	Average
1	0.651	0.622	0.574	0.538	0.579	0.900	0.769	0.902	0.848	1.006	1.000	1.212	1.149	1.462	1.443	1.545	0.950

Source: Audience measurement performed nationwide by Nielsen Korea.

Average TV viewership ratings
Ep.	Original broadcast date	Average audience share (Nielsen Korea)	
Ep.	Original broadcast date	Nationwide	Seoul
1	April 9, 2022	2.941% (5th)	3.057% (5th)
2	April 10, 2022	3.018% (5th)	3.236% (3rd)
3	April 16, 2022	2.552% (8th)	2.862% (6th)
4	April 17, 2022	2.325% (7th)	2.292% (8th)
5	April 23, 2022	2.766% (7th)	2.874% (5th)
6	April 24, 2022	3.832% (4th)	3.971% (4th)
7	April 30, 2022	3.306% (5th)	3.541% (5th)
8	May 1, 2022	3.876% (4th)	4.155% (4th)
9	May 7, 2022	3.625% (1st)	4.259% (1st)
10	May 8, 2022	4.594% (2nd)	5.242% (2nd)
11	May 14, 2022	4.142% (2nd)	4.583% (1st)
12	May 15, 2022	4.969% (1st)	5.603% (1st)
13	May 21, 2022	4.760% (1st)	4.981% (1st)
14	May 22, 2022	6.073% (1st)	6.547% (1st)
15	May 28, 2022	5.943% (1st)	6.720% (1st)
16	May 29, 2022	6.728% (1st)	7.616% (1st)
Average		4.091%	4.471%
In the table above, the blue numbers represent the lowest ratings and the red numbers represent the highest ratings.; This drama aired on a cable channel/pay TV which normally has a relatively smaller audience compared to free-to-air TV/public broadcasters (KBS, SBS, MBC and EBS).

== Reception ==
In the fourth week of May, Good Data Corporation reported that My Liberation Note had topped the TV-OTT Drama Buzzworthiness chart for four consecutive weeks. The show's buzzworthiness saw a 26.84% increase from the prior week, breaking its own record for seven consecutive weeks since its premiere. This achievement is second only to JTBC's SKY Castle. Son Suk-ku and Kim Ji-won secured the first and second spots, respectively, in TV-OTT Drama Performer Buzzworthiness for five consecutive weeks, with Lee Min-ki ranking sixth.

== Accolades ==
Name of the award ceremony, year presented, category, nominee of the award, and the result of the nomination
Award ceremony	Year	Category	Nominee / Work	Result	Ref.
APAN Star Awards	2022	Best Couple Award	Son Suk-ku & Kim Ji-won	Nominated	
APAN Star Awards	2022	Best Supporting Actress	Lee El	Nominated	
APAN Star Awards	2022	Best Writer Award	Park Hae-young	Nominated	
APAN Star Awards	2022	Drama of the Year	My Liberation Notes	Nominated	
APAN Star Awards	2022	Excellence Award, Actor in a Miniseries	Son Suk-ku	Nominated	
APAN Star Awards	2022	Excellence Award, Actress in a Miniseries	Kim Ji-won	Nominated	
APAN Star Awards	2022	Popularity Star Award, Actor	Son Suk-ku	Nominated	
Baeksang Arts Awards	2023	Best Screenplay	Park Hae-young	Won	
Baeksang Arts Awards	2023	Best Drama	My Liberation Notes	Nominated	
Baeksang Arts Awards	2023	Best Director	Kim Seok-yoon	Nominated	
Baeksang Arts Awards	2023	Best Actor	Son Suk-ku	Nominated	
Baeksang Arts Awards	2023	Best Actress	Kim Ji-won	Nominated	
Baeksang Arts Awards	2023	Best Supporting Actress	Lee El	Nominated	
Baeksang Arts Awards	2023	Best New Actress	Lee Kyung-seong	Nominated	
Kinolight Awards	2022	Korean Drama Of The Year	My Liberation Notes	2nd	
Korea Drama Awards	2022	Excellence Award, Actor	Lee Ki-woo	Won	
Korean Broadcasting Writers Awards	2022	Best Writer (Drama Category)	Park Hae-young	Won	
