= Park Soo-young (actor) =

South Korean actor

- Born: Park Soo-young; 15 March 1970 (age 56); South Korea
- Other names: Park Su-yeong, Park Su-young
- Occupation: Actor
- Years active: 2000–present
- Agent: Eggplant Entertainment
- Known for: My Beautiful Bride; Hi Bye, Mama! Listen to Love

Park Soo-young is a South Korean actor. He is known for his roles in dramas such as My Beautiful Bride (2015), Listen to Love (2016), Hi Bye, Mama! (2020) and Record Of Youth (2020).

== Filmography ==
=== Television series ===
Year	Title	Role	Ref.
2011	If Tomorrow Comes	Lee Jin-gyu	
2013	Heartless City	Detective Yang Ban-jang	
2013	KBS Drama Special: "The Devil Rider"	Mr.Gong	
2014	High School King of Savvy	Yoon Dong-jae	
2014	Pinocchio	Jang Ki-bong	
2015	Miss Mamma Mia	Shim Seok-bong	
2016	Uncontrollably Fond	Representative Namgoong	
2016	Listen to Love	Director Park Young-soo	
2017	The Rebel	Kim Ja-won	
2017	Bad Guys 2	Shin Joo-myung	
2018	My Mister	Lee Jae-chul	
2018	Come and Hug Me	Pyo Taek	
2018	Children of Nobody	Chief Hong Gi-tae	
2018	Just Dance	Vice Principal	
2019	The Light in Your Eyes	Kim Byun-sub	
2019	Doctor Prisoner	Oh Cheol-min	
2019	My First First Love	Do Hyun's father	
2019	My First First Love 2	Do Hyun's father	
2020	Hyena	Jo Woo-suk	
2020	Hi Bye, Mama!	Cha Moo-poong	
2020	Soul Mechanic	Oh Ki-tae	
2020	Record of Youth	Sa Young-nam	
2022	My Liberation Notes	Park Sang-min	
2022	Glitch	Kwon Young-woong	
2022	May I Help You?	Baek Dal-sik	
2022	Money Heist: Korea – Joint Economic Area	Yun Chang-su	
2022	Money Heist: Korea - Joint Economic Area - Part 2	Yun Chang-su	
2023	My Perfect Stranger	Hyung-man	
2024	The Auditors	Goo Suk-goo	
2026	We Are All Trying Here	Representative Park	

=== Film ===
Year	Title	Role	Ref.
2000	Peppermint Candy	Operative	
2004	Once Upon a Time in High School	Politics & Economics teacher	
2004	The Wolf Returns	Crew member	
2006	Tazza: The High Rollers	Go Ni's Uncle	
2008	Buzzing	Park-han	
2008	Rough Cut	Chief Lee	
2009	The Case of Itaewon Homicide	Chief Choi	
2009	Jeon Woo-chi: The Taoist Wizard	Nobleman's son	
2010	Secret Reunion	Regional police chief	
2011	Punch	Wan Deuk's father	
2012	Architecture 101	Architecture Koo	
2014	Thread of Lies	Mr.Lim	
2014	Tazza: The Hidden Card	Chang-shik	
2014	Cart	Discount store manager	
2016	A Melody To Remember	Colonel Park	
2016	Proof of Innocence	Lim Hyang-joo	
2016	The Last Princess	King Young-chin	
2017	The Mimic	Min-ji	
2017	Room No.7	Superintendent	
2018	The Negotiation	Section Chief Choi	
2021	Young Adult Matters	Principle	
2022	Next Sohee	Vince Principal	
2023	Punch-Drunk Love	Nak Bong	
2023	Miss Fortune	Teacher	
2024	Hijack 1971	Police Officer	
2024	About Family	Venerable Inhaeng	
2026	White Blast		

== Awards and nominations ==
- 2006 Theatrical Association Awards
- 2006 Men's Acting Awards
- 2007 Theatrical Awards Expected Theater Awards
