= Record of Youth =

2020 South Korean television series

- Promotional poster
- Hangul: 청춘기록
- Hanja: 青春紀錄
- RR: Cheongchungirok
- MR: Ch'ŏngch'un'girok
- Genre: Coming-of-age; Romance
- Created by: Studio Dragon
- Written by: Ha Myung-hee
- Directed by: Ahn Gil-ho
- Starring: Park Bo-gum; Park So-dam; Byeon Woo-seok
- Composer: Nam Hye-seung
- Country of origin: South Korea
- Original language: Korean
- No. of episodes: 16

Production
- Executive producer: Kim Seon-tae
- Producers: Kim Hee-yeol; Park Ji-young
- Production company: Pan Entertainment

Original release
- Network: TVN
- Release: September 7 – October 27, 2020

Record of Youth (Korean: 청춘기록) is a South Korean television series starring Park Bo-gum, Park So-dam, and Byeon Woo-seok.It aired on TVN from September 7 to October 27, 2020, every Monday and Tuesday at 21:00 (KST), and is available for streaming worldwide on Netflix. It aired while Park Bo-gum was serving in the Republic of Korea Navy as part of his compulsory military service.

At the time of airing, the series recorded the highest premiere viewership rating for a TvN Monday-Tuesday drama of all time, and became popular outside Korea through Netflix. It received praise for its depiction of millennials and Generation Z, and was nominated for Best Screenplay for Television at the 57th Baeksang Arts Awards. Forbes named it as one of the best Korean dramas of 2020.

== Synopsis ==
The series revolves around the lives of three young people in the entertainment industry as they strive to achieve their dreams and love without despair.

== Cast ==
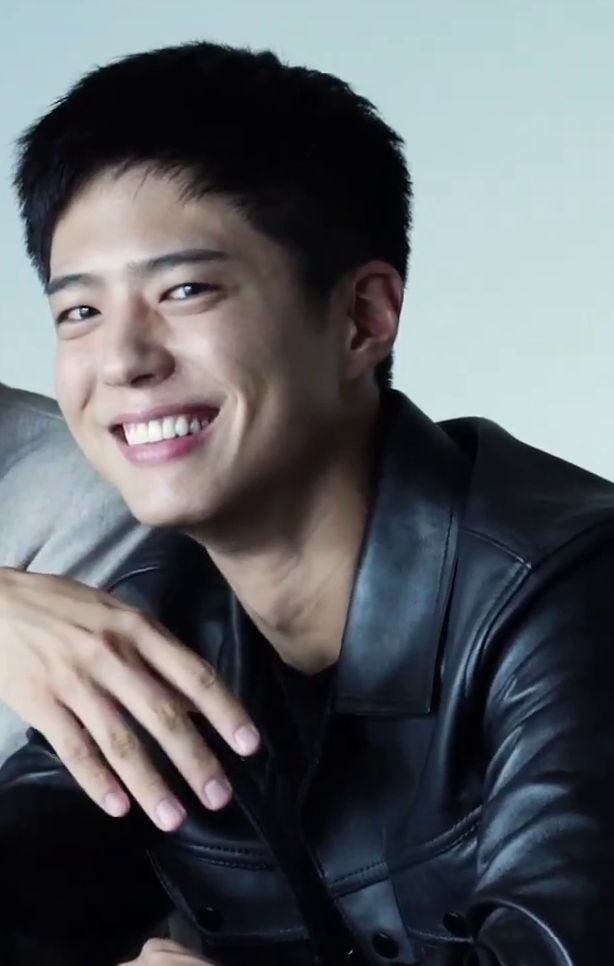
Park Bo-gum (Hye-jun) filming the series in 2020

=== Main ===
- Park Bo-gum as Sa Hye-jun
  - Im Jae-ha as young Sa Hye-jun

A model from a working-class family who dreams of becoming a top actor. Despite failing several auditions, he postpones his military enlistment and eventually begins to make his dreams come true.

- Park So-dam as Ahn Jeong-ha

A makeup artist, a fan-girl of Hye-jun as he models, she lives her life positively. After quitting her office job, she works at a beauty salon in Cheongdam-dong, where she is often criticized by her boss. Later, she opens her beauty salon.

- Byeon Woo-seok as Won Hae-hyo
  - Noh Young-min as young Won Hae-hyo

A model turned actor and one of Hye-jun's best friends. He comes from a rich family where his mother controls his professional life.

=== Supporting ===
==== Sa Hye-jun's family ====
- Ha Hee-ra as Han Ae-sook, Sa Hye-jun's mother
- Han Jin-hee as Sa Min-gi, Sa Hye-jun's grandfather
- Park Soo-young as Sa Young-nam, Sa Hye-jun's father
- Lee Jae-won as Sa Kyeong-jun, Sa Hye-jun's older brother

==== Won Hae-hyo's family ====
- Shin Ae-ra as Kim Yi-young, Won Hae-hyo's mother
- Seo Sang-won as Won Tae-kyeong, Won Hae-hyo's father
- Cho Yu-jung as Won Hae-na, Won Hae-hyo's younger sister

==== Kim Jin-woo's family ====
- Jung Min-sung as Kim Jang-man, Kim Jin-woo's father
- Park Sung-yeon as Lee Kyung-mi, Kim Jin-woo's mother
- Jang Yi-jung as Kim Jin-ri, Kim Jin-woo's younger sister

=== Others ===
- Kwon Soo-hyun as Kim Jin-woo
  - Baek Soo-min as young Kim Jin-woo
- Shin Dong-mi as Lee Min-jae, Sa Hye-jun's manager
- Lee Chang-hoon as Lee Tae-soo, Hye-jun's former manager and the new director at Park Do-ha's entertainment company
- Kwon Eun-soo as Gateway casting interviewer
- Park Se-hyun as Choi Soo-bin, Ahn Jeong-ha's friend and co-worker at the salon.
- Yang So-min as hair salon director
- Jo Ji-seung as Park Jin-ju, Ahn Jeong-ha's senior co-worker at the salon.
- Lim Ki-hong as Yang Moo-jin
- Kim Gun-woo as Park Do-ha, a top actor
- Kim Min-chul as Chi-yeong, Hye-Jun's chauffeur

=== Special appearances ===
- Kim Hye-yoon as Lee Bo-ra, a makeup artist (Ep. 1)
- Lee Seung-joon as Charlie Jung, a fashion designer (Ep. 1–2, 10)
- Lee Hae-woon as a producer/director (Ep. 1, 3)
- Kim Min-sang as director Choi Se-hun (Ep. 1, 4–5, 9)
- Kang So-young as a runaway model (Ep. 2)
- Seol In-ah as Jung Ji-ah, Hye-jun's ex-girlfriend (Ep.4, 7–15)
- Seo Hyun-jin as Lee Hyun-soo, an actress (Ep. 8–9)
- Bae Yoon-kyung as Kim Su-man (Ep. 8–16)
- Kang Han-na as Jessica, host of OVN Drama Awards (Ep. 9)
- Park Seul-gi as host at a press conference (Ep. 9)
- Park Seo-joon as Song Min-soo, an actor (Ep. 9–10)
- Lee Sung-kyung as Jin Seo-woo (Ep. 12)
- Lee Hye-ri as Lee Hae-ji (Ep. 13)
- Choi Soo-jong as a mall visitor (Ep. 14)

== Production ==
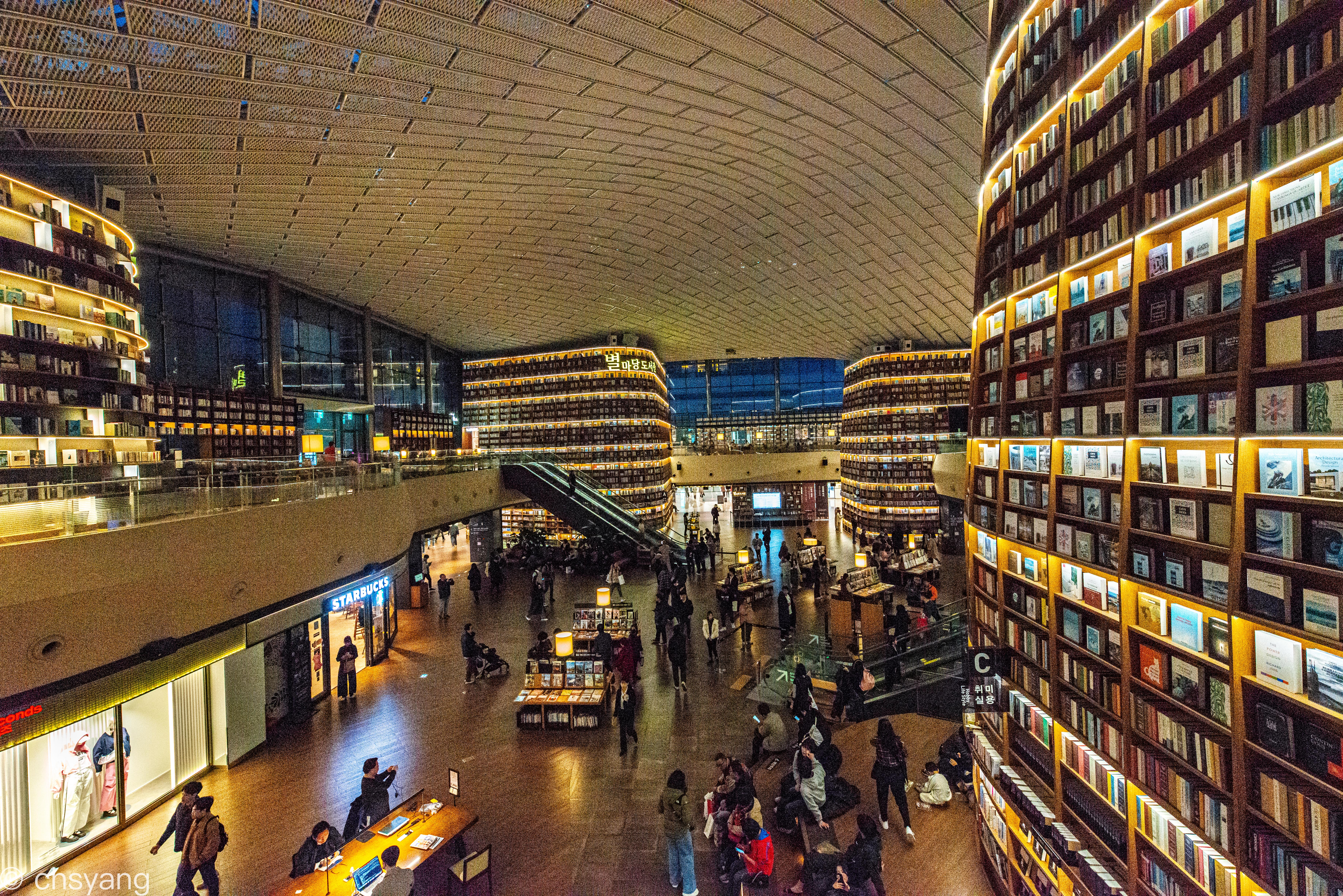
The Starfield Library (Korean: 별마당도서관) which featured in the series garnered attention

=== Casting ===
In April 2020, Park Bo-gum confirmed his appearance in the drama directed by Ahn Gil-ho and produced by Pan Entertainment. Park So-dam and Byeon Woo-seok were also confirmed to star. The first script reading of the series took place in July 2020.

=== Filming ===
Despite restrictions due to the COVID-19 pandemic and Park Bo-gum's on-going application to fulfill his mandatory military service, principal photography proceeded without delays. A departure from Korean drama convention, filming of the series was finished prior to its premiere. BMW Korea sponsored the vehicles in the drama. Filming locations of the series became popular among viewers including the Starfield Library inside Starfield COEX Mall and Baegot Hanul Park.

== Release ==
A scheduled online press conference attended by the cast on August 27, 2020 was cancelled due to concerns about the spread of COVID-19.

Record of Youth aired on TvN from September 7 to October 27, 2020, every Monday and Tuesday at 21:00 (KST). It was made available for streaming in 190 countries around the world through Netflix. While the series was airing, lead actor Park Bo-gum was serving the Republic of Korea Navy as part of his compulsory military service.

== Episodes ==
No. in series	Title	Directed by	Written by	Original release date
1	"Episode 1"	Ahn Gil-ho	Ha Myung-hee	September 7, 2020
2	"Episode 2"	Ahn Gil-ho	Ha Myung-hee	September 8, 2020
3	"Episode 3"	Ahn Gil-ho	Ha Myung-hee	September 14, 2020
4	"Episode 4"	Ahn Gil-ho	Ha Myung-hee	September 15, 2020
5	"Episode 5"	Ahn Gil-ho	Ha Myung-hee	September 21, 2020
6	"Episode 6"	Ahn Gil-ho	Ha Myung-hee	September 22, 2020
7	"Episode 7"	Ahn Gil-ho	Ha Myung-hee	September 28, 2020
8	"Episode 8"	Ahn Gil-ho	Ha Myung-hee	September 29, 2020
9	"Episode 9"	Ahn Gil-ho	Ha Myung-hee	October 5, 2020
10	"Episode 10"	Ahn Gil-ho	Ha Myung-hee	October 6, 2020
11	"Episode 11"	Ahn Gil-ho	Ha Myung-hee	October 11, 2020
12	"Episode 12"	Ahn Gil-ho	Ha Myung-hee	October 12, 2020
13	"Episode 13"	Ahn Gil-ho	Ha Myung-hee	October 19, 2020
14	"Episode 14"	Ahn Gil-ho	Ha Myung-hee	October 20, 2020
15	"Episode 15"	Ahn Gil-ho	Ha Myung-hee	October 26, 2020
16	"Episode 16"	Ahn Gil-ho	Ha Myung-hee	October 27, 2020

== Original soundtrack ==
Record of Youth Original Television Soundtrack

Soundtrack album by Various artists
- Released: October 26, 2020
- Genre: Soundtrack
- Languages: Korean; English
- Labels: Music&New; Pan Entertainment

Part 1

Released on September 7, 2020
No.	Title	Lyrics	Music	Artist	Length
1.	"Go"	Nam Hye-seung; Surf Green	Nam Hye-seung; Surf Green	Seung-kwan (Seventeen)	3:34
2.	"Go" (Inst.)		Nam Hye-seung; Surf Green		3:34
Total length:					7:08

Part 2

Released on September 15, 2020
No.	Title	Lyrics	Music	Artist	Length
1.	"You're In My Soul"	Nam Hye-seung; Surf Green; Jello Ann	Nam Hye-seung; Surf Green	Chungha	3:28
2.	"You're In My Soul" (Inst.)		Nam Hye-seung; Surf Green		3:28
Total length:					6:56

Part 3

Released on September 22, 2020
No.	Title	Lyrics	Music	Artist	Length
1.	"Every Second" (나의 시간은)	Nam Hye-seung	Nam Hye-seung; Honey Noise	Baekhyun (EXO)	3:33
2.	"Every Second" (Inst.)		Nam Hye-seung; Honey Noise		3:33
Total length:					7:06

Part 4

Released on September 28, 2020
No.	Title	Lyrics	Music	Artist	Length
1.	"Shine On You" (그렇게 넌 내게 빛나)	Nam Hye-seung; Surf Green	Nam Hye-seung; Surf Green	Wheein (Mamamoo)	4:28
2.	"Shine On You" (Inst.)		Nam Hye-seung; Surf Green		4:28
Total length:					8:56

Part 5

Released on September 29, 2020
No.	Title	Lyrics	Music	Artist	Length
1.	"What If"	Nam Hye-seung; Park Jin-ho	Nam Hye-seung; Park Jin-ho	Kim Jae-hwan	3:45
2.	"What If" (Inst.)		Nam Hye-seung; Park Jin-ho		3:45
Total length:					7:30

Part 6

Released on October 5, 2020
No.	Title	Lyrics	Music	Artist	Length
1.	"Spotlight"	Nam Hye-seung; Kim Kyung-hee	Nam Hye-seung; Kim Kyung-hee	Bobby (iKON)	3:36
2.	"Spotlight" (Inst.)		Nam Hye-seung; Kim Kyung-hee		3:36
Total length:					7:12

Part 7

Released on October 6, 2020
No.	Title	Lyrics	Music	Artist	Length
1.	"Brave Enough"	Nam Hye-seung; Kim Kyung-hee	Nam Hye-seung; Park Sang-hee	Lee Hi	4:05
2.	"Brave Enough" (Inst.)		Nam Hye-seung; Park Sang-hee		4:05
Total length:					8:10

Part 8

Released on October 12, 2020
No.	Title	Lyrics	Music	Artist	Length
1.	"Just You" (너로 가득해)	Nam Hye-seung; Kim Kyung-hee	Nam Hye-seung; Kim Kyung-hee	J Rabbit	3:51
2.	"Just You" (Inst.)		Nam Hye-seung; Kim Kyung-hee		3:51
Total length:					7:42

Part 9

Released on October 13, 2020
No.	Title	Lyrics	Music	Artist	Length
1.	"What My Heart Says" (내 마음이 그렇대)	Nam Hye-seung; Surf Green	Nam Hye-seung; Surf Green	Kim Se-jeong (Gugudan)	3:51
2.	"What My Heart Says" (Inst.)		Nam Hye-seung; Surf Green		3:51
Total length:					7:42

Part 10

Released on October 19, 2020
No.	Title	Lyrics	Music	Artist	Length
1.	"It's OK, Because It's You" (넌 그래도 돼)	Nam Hye-seung; Surf Green	Nam Hye-seung; Surf Green	Xani	3:55
2.	"It's OK, Because It's You" (Inst.)		Nam Hye-seung; Surf Green		3:55
Total length:					7:50

Part 11

Released on October 20, 2020
No.	Title	Lyrics	Music	Artist	Length
1.	"Open Door"	Nam Hye-seung; Jello Ann	Nam Hye-seung; Park Sang-hee	Janet Suhh	3:16
2.	"Still Dreaming"	Kim Kyung-hee	Nam Hye-seung; Kim Kyung-hee	Janet Suhh	3:36
3.	"Open Door" (Inst.)		Nam Hye-seung; Park Sang-hee		3:16
4.	"Still Dreaming" (Inst.)		Nam Hye-seung; Kim Kyung-hee		3:36
Total length:					13:44

=== Chart performance ===
Title	Year	Peak positions	Remarks	Ref.
Title	Year	KOR	Remarks	Ref.
"Every Second" (Baekhyun)	2020	45	Part 3	
"Shine On You" (Wheein)	2020	172	Part 4	
"What If" (Kim Jae-hwan)	2020	120	Part 5	
"Brave Enough" (Lee Hi)	2020	186	Part 7	

== Reception ==
=== Critical response ===
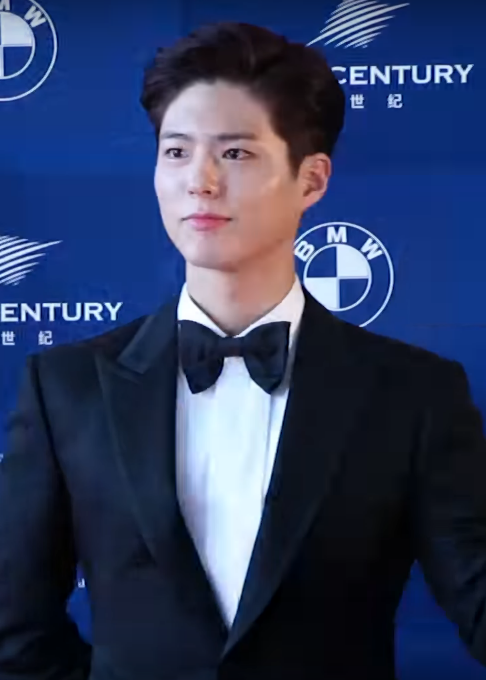
Park Bo-gum, who was completing his mandatory military service when the series aired, received praise for his performance

The series received praise for its depiction of millennials and Gen Z, and was nominated for Best Screenplay for Television at the 57th Baeksang Arts Awards. Forbes named it as one of the best Korean dramas of 2020. Park Bo-gum's performance in the drama was lauded and cemented his reputation as a "National Treasure"-level actor.

=== Impact ===
Despite being in the military and prohibited to promote at the time of the show's airing, lead actor Park Bo-gum ranked first in overall topicality making him the "Most Buzzworthy Performer" (TV and OTT; Drama and Entertainment) for eight consecutive weeks after the series premiered per big data analytics firm Good Data Corporation. The show also topped topicality indices until the end of its run. In addition, Park Bo-gum ranked 2nd in Gallup Korea's Television Actor of the Year survey in 2020. The success of the series drove the production company Pan Entertainment's stock up to 42%.

=== Viewership ===
On Netflix, it topped viewership rankings in several territories.

A 6.362% viewership rating was recorded nationwide for the series's first episode, making it one of the highest premiere ratings of the network. It achieved the number one viewer rating for TVN's first Monday-Tuesday drama. Since then, it has been quickly rising without a drop rating and maintained its first place in the same time slot, even after two competitors began airing.

Record of Youth : South Korea viewers per episode (millions)

Season	Episode number																Average
Season	1	2	3	4	5	6	7	8	9	10	11	12	13	14	15	16	Average
1	1.406	1.569	1.708	1.919	1.677	1.694	1.681	1.863	1.722	1.843	1.794	1.762	1.800	1.795	1.764	1.999	1.750

Source: Audience measurement performed nationwide by Nielsen Korea.

Average TV viewership ratings
Ep.	Original broadcast date	Average audience share (Nielsen Korea)	
Ep.	Original broadcast date	Nationwide	Seoul
1	September 7, 2020	6.362% (1st)	7.791% (1st)
2	September 8, 2020	6.802% (1st)	8.217% (1st)
3	September 14, 2020	7.200% (1st)	9.102% (1st)
4	September 15, 2020	7.823% (1st)	9.626% (1st)
5	September 21, 2020	7.801% (1st)	9.037% (1st)
6	September 22, 2020	6.995% (1st)	8.409% (1st)
7	September 28, 2020	7.730% (1st)	9.368% (1st)
8	September 29, 2020	7.734% (1st)	9.225% (1st)
9	October 5, 2020	7.404% (1st)	8.974% (1st)
10	October 6, 2020	8.238% (1st)	10.063% (1st)
11	October 12, 2020	8.262% (1st)	9.618% (1st)
12	October 13, 2020	7.798% (1st)	9.439% (1st)
13	October 19, 2020	7.760% (1st)	9.313% (1st)
14	October 20, 2020	7.772% (1st)	9.617% (1st)
15	October 26, 2020	7.625% (1st)	9.134% (1st)
16	October 27, 2020	8.740% (1st)	10.728% (1st)
Average		7.628%	9.229%
The blue numbers represent the lowest ratings and the red numbers represent the highest ratings.; This drama airs on a cable channel/pay TV which normally has a relatively smaller audience compared to free-to-air TV/public broadcasters (KBS, SBS, MBC and EBS).

== Accolades ==
=== Awards and nominations ===
Award	Year	Category	Recipient	Result	Ref.
APAN Star Awards	2021	Excellence Award, Actor in a Miniseries	Park Bo-gum	Nominated	
APAN Star Awards	2021	Popular Star Award, Actor	Park Bo-gum	Nominated	
Asia Artist Awards	2020	Popularity Award, Television Actor	Park Bo-gum	Nominated	
Baeksang Arts Awards	2021	Best Screenplay – Television	Ha Myung-hee	Nominated	

=== Listicles ===
Name of publisher, year listed, name of listicle, recipient, and placement
Publication	Year	List	Recipient	Placement	Ref.
Forbes	2020	The 13 Best Korean Dramas of 2020	Record of Youth	Included	
Newsweek	2020	A Beginner's Guide to the Best Korean Shows	Record of Youth	Included	
