= 21st Seoul International Drama Awards =

Award ceremony in 2026

- Sponsored by: Idolchamp; Mugen
- Date: October 8, 2026
- Location: KBS Hall, Yeouido, Seoul
- Country: South Korea
- Presented by: Seoul Drama Awards Organizing Committee; Korean Broadcasters Association
- Most nominations: A Better Man; We Are All Trying Here

Television/radio coverage
- Network: KBS

The 21st Seoul International Drama Awards (Korean: 제21회 서울 드라마 어워즈) festival is held on October 6–10, 2026 at KBS Hall, Yeouido, Seoul. The host is the Seoul Drama Awards Organizing Committee (Korean Broadcasters Association), and the event is supported by the Ministry of Culture, Sports and Tourism, the Seoul Metropolitan Government, KBS, MBC, SBS, EBS, and CBS. The sponsor is IDOLCHAMP and MUGEN. 352 entries from 46 countries and regions countries vied for awards in this edition.

== Events ==
Event	Date	Location
70th Anniversary Celebration of Korean Drama	October 8, 2026	COEX Magok LE WEST Hall A
Major Event: Red Carpet & Awards Ceremony; After Party	October 8, 2026	KBS Hall
Drama Festa	October 9–10, 2026	

== Winners and nominees ==
The nominations for the 21st Annual Seoul International Drama Awards were announced on August 20, 2026. Winners are listed first and denoted in bold.

=== Program ===
Program
**Grand Prize (Daesang)**: **A Better Man** Maipo Film, Beta Film (Norway)
**Best Mini-Series**: **My Royal Nemesis** Studio S Co., Ltd. (South Korea); **Pluribus** Apple TV (U.S.A.); **The Dream Life of Mr. Kim** SLL (South Korea); A Better Man Maipo Film, Beta Film (Norway); A Woman of Substance The Forge (U.K.); Beef Season 2 Netflix (U.S.A.); Empire Oktoberfest S2 Beta Film (Germany); Mozart Mozart Beta Film (Germany); Nepobaby OBLE (Norway); Slow Horses S5 Apple TV (U.K.); You and Everything Else Netflix Services Korea, Ltd (South Korea); We Are All Trying Here SLL (South Korea)	**Best TV Movie**: **Disclosure** W&B Television GmbH (Germany); Dirty Business All3Media International (U.K.); Goolagong Werner Film Productions (Australia); Mikoko Vegon (Togo); No One Home Hakka TV (Taiwan); The Carry-On Hakka TV (Taiwan)
**Best Short-form Drama**: **Unfiltered** Vértigo Films (Spain); Atlantis Pasila Yellow Film & TV (Finland); Hidden ID: Sky-High Tips Tencent Video (China); My Baby Daddy is My Best Friend KidariStudio, Inc. (South Korea); Now You See Him – Revenge of a Blind Wife – emole Inc. (U.S.A.)	**Jury's Special Prize**: TBA

=== Individual ===
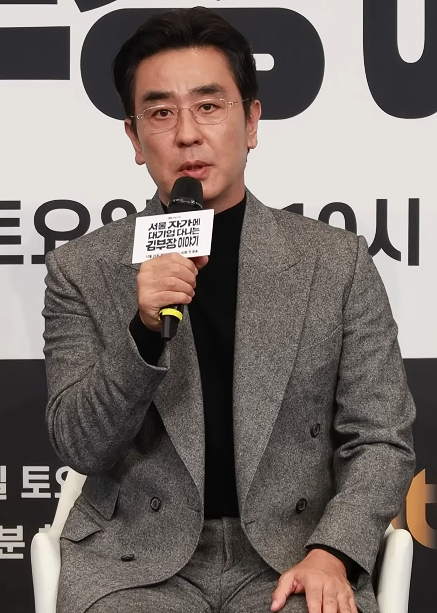
Ryu Seung-ryong

NOTE:
No roles for nominated/winning actor(s)/actress(es) needed.

Individual
**Best Actor**: **Ryu Seung-ryong** — The Dream Life of Mr. Kim SLL (South Korea); **Anders Baasmo** — A Better Man Maipo Film, Beta Film (Norway); Charles Melton — Beef Season 2 Netflix (U.S.A.); Gary Oldman — Slow Horses S5 Apple TV (U.K.); Hiroki Hasegawa — Sleepy Eyes of Death : Nemuri Kyoshiro NHK ENTERPRISES.INC (Japan); Jung Il-woo — Our Golden Days KBS (South Korea); Koo Kyo-hwan — We Are All Trying Here SLL (South Korea); Kim Seon-ho — Can This Love Be Translated? Netflix Services Korea, Ltd (South Korea)	**Best Actress**: **Elizaveta Maximová** — Mom Czech Television (Czech Republic); Asuka Hamaru — My Daughter Was a Bully emole Inc. (Japan); Carey Mulligan — Beef Season 2 Netflix (U.S.A.); Kim Go-eun — You and Everything Else Netflix Services Korea, Ltd (South Korea); Jung In-sun — Our Golden Days KBS (South Korea); Karent Hinestroza — Defying Destiny Caracol Televisión and Netflix (Colombia); Lila McGuire — Goolagong Werner Film Productions (Australia); Rhea Seehorn — Pluribus Apple TV (U.S.A.); Wu Yi-jung — The Carry-On Hakka TV (Taiwan); Go Youn-jung — Can This Love Be Translated? / We Are All Trying Here Netflix Services Korea, Ltd / SLL (South Korea)
**Best Director**: **Vince Gilligan, Gordon Smith** — Pluribus Apple TV (U.S.A); Chi-cheng Chiang, Chi-feng Chien — Had I Not Seen the Sun Gala Television Corporation, Make A Deal International Production Co., Ltd. (Taiwan); Miranda Edmonds, Khrob Edmonds — Whale Shark Jack Australian Children's Television Foundation (Australia); Rafael Martinez, Daniel Arenas — Defying Destiny Televisión and Netflix (Colombia); Sung-jin Lee, Jake Schreier — Beef Season 2 Netflix (U.S.A); Thomas Seeberg Torjussen, Gjyljeta Berisha — A Better Man Maipo Film, Beta Film (Norway); Vardis Marinakis — The Great Chimera Beta Film (Greece); You Quan — Hidden ID: Sky-High Tips Tencent Video (China)	**Best Screenwriter**: **Thomas Seeberg Torjussen** — A Better Man Maipo Film, Beta Film (Norway); Lee Byeong-heon — My Baby Daddy is My Best Friend KidariStudio, Inc. (South Korea); Dirk Eisfeld — Nuremberg 45 Zeitsprung Pictures, Spiegel TV GmbH, NDR, nordmedia (Germany); Park Hae-young — We Are All Trying Here SLL (South Korea); Juana Uribe — Defying Destiny Caracol Televisión and Netflix (Colombia); Vince Gilligan — Pluribus Apple TV (U.S.A.); Will Smith — Slow Horses S5 Apple TV (U.K.); Yilmaz Sahin — Envy AY YAPIM (Turkiye)

=== International Invitation: Outstanding Asian Stars ===
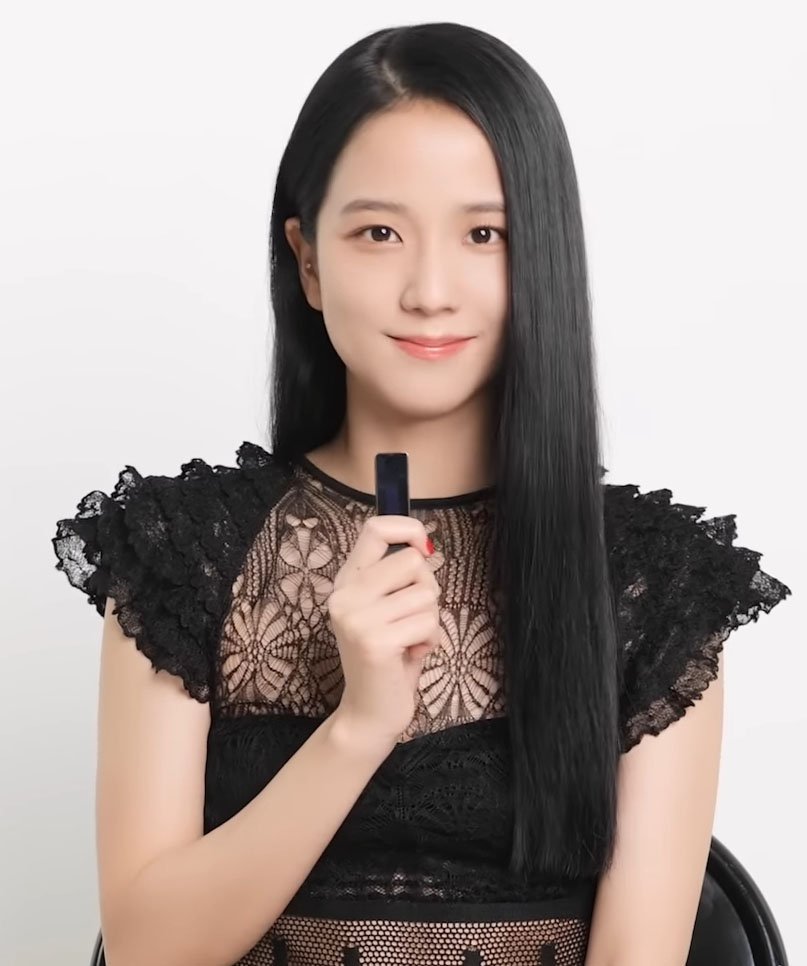
Jisoo

Outstanding Asian Star
**South Korea (Actor)**: **Na Jae-min** (Wind Up - South Korea)	**South Korea (Actress)**: **Jisoo** (Boyfriend on Demand - Netflix, South Korea)
**Japan**: **Jin Akanishi** (Romantic Anonymous - Netflix, Japan)	**China**: **Yang Yang** (The Immortal Ascension - China Huace Film&TV Co., Ltd, China)
**Philippines**: **Paulo Avelino** (Alibi - ABS-CBN Studios, Philippines)	**Thailand**: **Rebecca Patricia Armstrong** (Girl From Nowhere: The Reset - Netflix, Thailand)
**Singapore**: **Gladys Bay**

=== K-Drama Competition Category ===
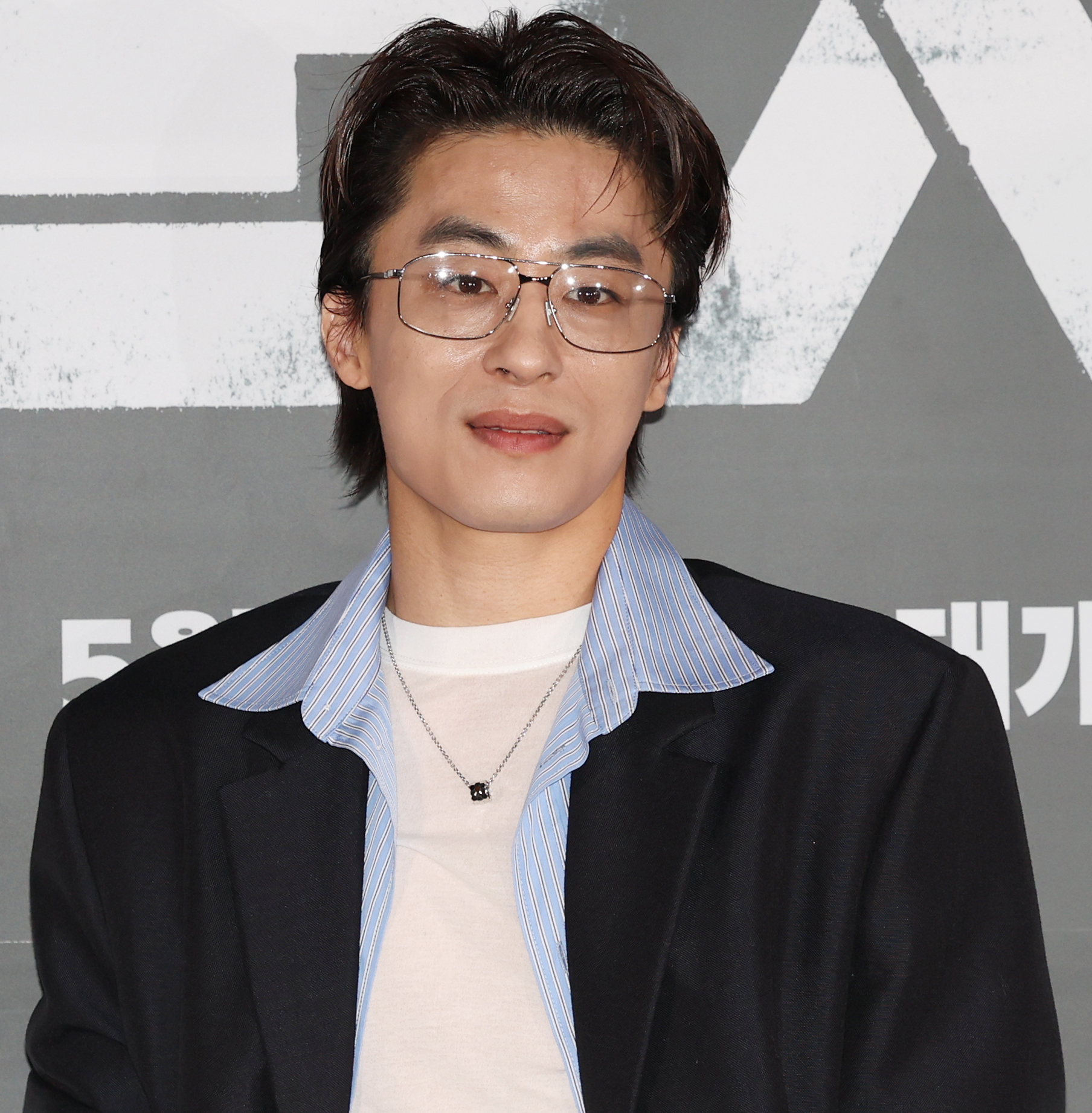
Koo Kyo-hwan

K-Drama Competition Category
**Outstanding Korean Drama**: The Dream Life of Mr. Kim; We Are All Trying Here
**Outstanding Korean Actor**: Koo Kyo-hwan We Are All Trying Here (SLL, South Korea)	**Outstanding Korean Actress**: Lim Ji-yeon My Royal Nemesis (Studio S, South Korea)
**Outstanding Korean Drama O.S.T**: Anton – "Close to Me" Yumi's Cells (TVING, South Korea)
