= My Mister =

2018 South Korean television series

- Promotional poster
- Also known as: My Ahjussi
- Hangul: 나의 아저씨
- RR: Naui ajeossi
- MR: Naŭi ajŏssi
- Genre: Psychological drama Tragedy
- Created by: Studio Dragon
- Written by: Park Hae-young
- Directed by: Kim Won-seok
- Starring: Lee Sun-kyun; Lee Ji-eun
- Composer: Movie Closer
- Country of origin: South Korea
- Original language: Korean
- No. of episodes: 16

Production
- Executive producers: Cho Hyung-jin; Kim Sang-heon; Park Ho-sik
- Producer: Park Ji-hyun
- Camera setup: Single-camera
- Running time: 90 minutes
- Production companies: Chorokbaem Media; Studio Dragon

Original release
- Network: tvN
- Release: March 21 – May 17, 2018

My Mister (Korean: 나의 아저씨; RR: Naui ajeossi) is a 2018 South Korean television series starring Lee Sun-kyun and IU. The series was directed by Kim Won-seok, written by Park Hae-young and produced by Chorokbaem Media. It aired on tvN from March 21 to May 17, 2018, on Wednesdays and Thursdays at 21:30 (KST).

The drama received critical acclaim, winning Best Drama at the 55th Baeksang Arts Awards.

== Synopsis ==
My Mister follows a young woman, Lee Ji-an (Lee Ji-eun), burdened by debt and hardship as she struggles to support her ailing grandmother while working a temporary job. She crosses paths with Park Dong-hoon (Lee Sun-kyun), a man carrying deep personal wounds and grappling with betrayal, workplace mistreatment, and the heavy responsibility of his family. As they navigate their struggles, they form a bond that offers solace, understanding, and the possibility of healing.

== Cast ==
=== Main ===
- Lee Sun-kyun as Park Dong-hoon

A man in his 40s, Dong-hoon is the second oldest and the most successful of the three brothers. He works as a structural engineer and always has a safety-first approach to life. He is quiet and stoic, but goes all in for the people he loves.

- Lee Ji-eun (IU) as Lee Ji-an
  - Kim Gyu-ri as child Ji-an

Ji-an is a woman in her 20s who is enduring many hardships in life, drowning in debt and taking care of her deaf grandmother. During her middle school years, Ji-an was sentenced to two years' jail for the murder of a loan shark (Lee Kwang-il's father) in self defense, while trying to protect her grandmother. She has found a temporary job at the same company as Park Dong-hoon.

=== Supporting ===
==== Dong-hoon's family ====
- Go Doo-shim as Byun Yo-soon

A loving mother with three sons who worries about her eldest living apart from his family, and her youngest, who has yet to get married despite being over 40.

- Park Ho-san as Park Sang-hoon

Dong-hoon's eldest brother. He is a middle-aged man who lost his job and then tried to start two business that failed, and was chased out of his own home. Though he has to live under his mother's roof, he's a romanticist at heart who always thinks about ways to find happiness.

- Song Sae-byeok as Park Ki-hoon

Dong-hoon's younger brother. He was once seen as a genius director because of an independent film he shot when he was twenty. However, 20 years have passed since his glory days and he has yet to successfully launch his career as a movie director.

- Lee Ji-ah as Kang Yoon-hee, Park Dong-hoon's wife, who is having an affair with Do Joon-young, her husband's boss.
- Jung Young-joo as Jo Ae-ryun, Park Sang-hoon's estranged wife.

==== Lee Ji-an's family ====
- Son Sook as Lee Bong-ae: Lee Ji-an's deaf grandmother.

==== People around Lee Ji-an ====
- Jang Ki-yong as Lee Kwang-il

A loan shark Ji-an owes money to, who liked Ji-an when he was young. His father was killed by Ji-an in self defense, while she was trying to protect her grandmother. He torments and brutalizes Ji-an.

- Ahn Seung-gyun as Song Ki-bum

Ji-an's best friend who is obsessed with computer games.

- Lee Young-seok as Seo Choon-dae: An elderly man and cleaner who is caring towards Ji-an.
- Hong-In as Jong-soo: loan shark Lee Kwang-il's accomplice / colleague.

==== People in the company ====
- Kim Young-min as Do Joon-young

Dong-hoon's college junior and his and Ji-an's boss, currently working as a CEO. He has an affair with Yoon-hee and seeks to fire Dong-hoon.

- Shin Goo as Chairman Jang Hoe-jang
- Jung Hae-kyun as Director Park Dong-un
- Jung Jae-sung as Executive Director Yoon Sang-tae
- Seo Hyun-woo as Head of Section Seo
- Chae Dong-hyun as Kim Dae-ri
- Kim Min-seok as Yeo Hyung-kyu
- Ryu Sun-young as Jung Chae-ryung

Dong-hoon and Ji-an's co-worker.

==== Extended ====
- Kwon Nara as Choi Yoo-ra

A movie actress, and Park Ki-hoon's love interest.

- Park Hae-joon as Gyum-duk

A Buddhist monk who is Dong-hoon's friend and Jung-hee's ex-boyfriend. His real name is Yoon Sang-won before he ordained as a monk and changed his name to Gyum-duk

- Oh Na-ra as Jung-hee

Owner of Jung-hee's Bar, friends with Dong-hoon. Her bar provides an informal meeting place for the whole neighborhood.

- Shin Dam-soo as Director Jung Chang-mo
- Park Soo-young as Je-cheol

A neighborhood friend of the Park brothers and regular at Jung-hee's bar. Neighborhood soccer league.

- Seo Sang-won as Go Jin-beom

Another neighborhood friend of the Park brothers and regular at Jung-hee's bar. Neighborhood soccer league.

- Lee Do-hyun as Im Kwon-sik

Neighborhood friend of the Park brothers and regular at Jung-hee's bar. Neighborhood soccer league.

==== Others ====
- Chang Ryul as Assistant Director

== Production ==
On November 8, 2017, news outlets reported that Lee Sun-kyun and IU would play the leads in My Mister, directed by Kim Won-seok of Misaeng and Signal, and written by Park Hae-young of Another Miss Oh. Both tvN and IU's agency commented that nothing had been finalized; the main cast was confirmed on November 13 with the addition of Oh Dal-su and Song Sae-byeok as Lee Sun-kyun's character's brothers, and Na Moon-hee as the mother of the three. IU accepted the part of Lee Ji-an because she was interested in working with director Kim Won-seok and because the silent, tense role differed from the cheerful and cute characters she had previously portrayed.

In December, Jang Ki-yong, Lee Ji-ah, Kim Young-min, Jung Young-joo and Kwon Na-ra joined the series. On February 19, 2018, Na Moon-hee was replaced by Go Doo-shim due to schedule conflicts. At the end of the month, Oh Dal-su left the series following allegations of sexual abuse and Park Ho-san took over.

The cast gathered for the first script reading on December 18, 2017. Filming was scheduled to partly pre-produce the drama, but ended up protracted, having to reshoot Oh Dal-su's scenes and due to the setting predominantly nocturnal: episodes 13 and 14, scheduled for May 2 and 3, 2018, were postponed for a week to let the cast and staff rest, and filming ended on May 15, one day before the airing of the last two episodes.

=== Original soundtrack ===
My Mister OST

Soundtrack album by Various Artists
- Released: May 18, 2018
- Genres: Soundtrack; ballad; rock
- Language: Korean
- Label: Stone Music Entertainment

Original Soundtrack (Parts 1–8)
Part 1

Released on March 22, 2018
No.	Title	Lyrics	Music	Artist	Length
1.	"That Man" (그 사나이)	Ham Jung-ah	Ham Jung-ah	Lee Hee-moon	03:55
2.	"That Man (Inst.)" (그 사나이 (Inst.))		Ham Jung-ah		03:55
Total length:					07:50

Part 2

Released on March 29, 2018
No.	Title	Lyrics	Music	Artist	Length
1.	"Adult" (어른)	Seo Dong-sung, Lee Chi-hoon	Park Sung-il	Sondia	04:20
2.	"Adult (Inst.)" (어른 (Inst.))		Park Soung-il		04:20
Total length:					08:40

Part 3

Released on April 5, 2018
No.	Title	Lyrics	Music	Artist	Length
1.	"An Ordinary Day" (보통의 하루)	Park Asher	Park Asher	Jung Seung-hwan	04:36
2.	"An Ordinary Day (Inst.)" (보통의 하루 (Inst.))		Park Asher		04:36
Total length:					09:12

Part 4

Released on April 12, 2018
No.	Title	Lyrics	Music	Artist	Length
1.	"Dear Moon"	IU	Kim Je-hwi	Kim Je-hwi	04:58
2.	"Dear Moon (Inst.)"		Kim Je-hwi		04:58
Total length:					09:56

Part 5

Released on April 19, 2018
No.	Title	Lyrics	Music	Artist	Length
1.	"One Million Roses" (백만송이 장미)	Sim Soo-bong	Raimonds Pauls	Ko Woo-rim	04:40
2.	"One Million Roses (Inst.)" (백만송이 장미 (Inst.))		Raimonds Pauls		04:40
Total length:					09:20

Part 6

Released on April 26, 2018
No.	Title	Lyrics	Music	Artist	Length
1.	"There's Rainbow (Band ver.)" (무지개는 있다 (Band ver.))	Seo Dong-sung	Park Sung-il	Vincent Blue	03:26
2.	"There's Rainbow (Acoustic ver.)" (무지개는 있다 (Acoustic ver.))	Seo Dong-sung	Park Sung-il	O.WHEN	03:16
Total length:					06:42

Part 7

Released on May 10, 2018
No.	Title	Lyrics	Music	Artist	Length
1.	"My Image Reflected In My Heart" (내 마음에 비친 내 모습)	Yoo Jae-ha	Yoo Jae-ha	Kwak Jin-eon	04:33
2.	"My Image Reflected In My Heart (Piano Ver.)" (내 마음에 비친 내 모습 (Piano Ver.))	Yoo Jae-ha	Yoo Jae-ha	Kwak Jin-eon	04:53
Total length:					09:26

Part 8

Released on May 17, 2018
No.	Title	Lyrics	Music	Artist	Length
1.	"Forest" (숲)	Park Asher	Park Asher	Ji-sun	04:26
2.	"Forest (Inst.)" (숲 (Inst.))		Park Asher		04:26
Total length:					08:52

Original Soundtrack (Disc 2)

Disc 2
No.	Title	Artist	Length
1.	"Title of My Mister" (Opening Title)	Various Artists	0:39
2.	"A Secret Deal"	Various Artists	2:56
3.	"A Path of Heart"	Various Artists	2:32
4.	"Background Check"	Various Artists	3:01
5.	"Crumpled Life"	Various Artists	2:03
6.	"Dangerous Child"	Various Artists	2:20
7.	"Guilty"	Various Artists	2:08
8.	"Last pride"	Various Artists	2:00
9.	"My Mister"	Various Artists	2:15
10.	"Operation plan"	Various Artists	2:17
11.	"Our Family"	Various Artists	3:15
12.	"Person like that"	Various Artists	1:08
13.	"Realism"	Various Artists	1:08
14.	"Social Life"	Various Artists	2:15
15.	"Three Brothers"	Various Artists	2:32
16.	"Their love law"	Various Artists	2:17
17.	"Trap"	Various Artists	2:23
18.	"Tap"	Various Artists	2:15
19.	"The Truth Revealed"	Various Artists	2:24
20.	"When you want to rest your mind"	Various Artists	2:59
21.	"Way back home"	Various Artists	3:11
22.	"We both feel sorry for you"	Various Artists	2:40
23.	"Weight of life"	Various Artists	2:47

== Reception ==
After the first episode aired, My Mister was accused of glorifying dating violence due to a scene where loan shark Kwang-il assaults Ji-an, who replies "Do you like me?", and because Kwang-il's official description said he bothered Ji-an as it was the only way to make her see him. The Korea Communications Standards Commission commented that a number of complaints had been received and that it was checking them, while the production team replied that the complicated relationship between the two characters would be resolved gradually and to be patient. The director and the actors pointed out that violence and crime were only narrative tools. IU herself intervened, saying, "Kwang-il and Ji-an have the most conflictual relationship. How could you love someone so violent?"

Real News instead observed that the first two episodes had managed to demonstrate the intention of depicting the process of mutual understanding between characters of different generations and genders who were at odds with each other, while pop culture critic Jung Deok-hyun called My Mister "a survival thriller." He later added that the intent of the series was to depict the pursuit of happiness in hell.

Overcoming the controversies, My Mister ended with the support of the public and the critics, who called it "a life drama" centered on people and one of the best series of the year. Ji-an was praised by the press for not being a poor and helpless heroine, but able to grasp the whole situation and create an advantageous situation for herself, taking matters into her own hands. The directing and the actors' performances were praised, and IU was complimented for effortlessly digesting a character tired of living a harsh life.

Seo Byung-gi of the Korea Herald Business commented that the series made him think about life, family and society, and noted that Dong-hoon and Ji-an were "wonderfully connected" by their wounds. Huffington Post Korea and Sports Hankook wrote that it talked about the meeting of broken people of different ages and genders, blurring the lines between the many barriers of today's society and showing how human solidarity led to demolishing one's walls and discovering that the world was a warmer place than expected.

The Chosun Ilbo and The Korea Herald identified the depiction of a life no different from that experienced by ordinary people as the reason for the success of My Mister, and that the characters facing "real wars" such as unemployment, job insecurity, job hunting, divorce and extramarital affairs had touched the hearts of the viewers "with a painfully bleak but warm impression," celebrating a world in which it was difficult to live, but which could be made bearable and happy if you had someone by your side. Lee Do-yeon of Yonhap News added that it had demonstrated that people separated like islands could build a bridge-like bond through compassion and understanding, and that the show's message was that people could comfort and understand each other because everyone harbored pain in their hearts.

The script of the series, which went on sale in 2022, registered more than 10,000 pre-orders, ranking fourth on Kyobo Book's best-sellers list and becoming the second best-selling drama script of the year. Ultimately, the drama received critical acclaim for its screenplay and direction. The cast similarly received praise for their performances, which viewers called "life work" for all of the actors.

=== Viewership ===
This series airs on tvN, a cable channel/pay TV which normally has a relatively smaller audience compared to free-to-air TV/public broadcasters (KBS, SBS, MBC and EBS). The drama was a critical and commercial success, consistently topping the cable television viewership ratings in its time slot. While it began with ratings of 3-4%, deemed below expectations due to, according to Yonhap News, the too heavy atmosphere, it reached 6% with episode 12. Its final episode recorded a with 7.352% nationwide audience share according to Nielsen paid platform making the episode one of the highest rated in Korean cable television history at the time. My Mister drew a solid average viewership rating of 5% for a cable TV show and topped the Contents Power Index (CPI) rankings, as well as the TV popularity ranking, six times during its nine-week run.

My Mister : South Korea viewers per episode (millions)

Season	Episode number																Average
Season	1	2	3	4	5	6	7	8	9	10	11	12	13	14	15	16	Average
1	0.867	0.846	0.743	0.719	0.818	0.925	0.981	1.148	1.054	1.233	0.950	1.260	1.269	1.364	1.322	1.600	1.069

Source: Audience measurement performed nationwide by Nielsen Media Research.

Average TV viewership ratings
Ep.	Original broadcast date	Average audience share		
Ep.	Original broadcast date	AGB Nielsen		TNmS
Ep.	Original broadcast date	Nationwide	Seoul	Nationwide
1	March 21, 2018	3.923%	4.467%	4.6%
2	March 22, 2018	4.133%	4.786%	4.1%
3	March 28, 2018	3.373%	4.102%	3.9%
4	March 29, 2018	3.611%	3.851%	4.3%
5	April 4, 2018	3.936%	4.838%	3.7%
6	April 5, 2018	4.038%	4.468%	4.6%
7	April 11, 2018	4.487%	5.234%	4.7%
8	April 12, 2018	5.313%	5.671%	4.6%
9	April 18, 2018	4.803%	5.413%	3.8%
10	April 19, 2018	5.824%	6.472%	5.6%
11	April 25, 2018	4.965%	5.926%	4.6%
12	April 26, 2018	6.035%	6.572%	5.5%
13	May 9, 2018	5.635%	6.227%	5.3%
14	May 10, 2018	6.468%	7.374%	5.5%
15	May 16, 2018	5.819%	6.221%	5.7%
16	May 17, 2018	7.352%	8.170%	7.2%
Average		4.982%	5.612%	4.9%
Special	May 3, 2018	3.187%	4.008%	3.0%
In the table above, the blue numbers represent the lowest ratings and the red numbers represent the highest ratings.

=== Awards and nominations ===
Year	Award	Category	Recipient	Result	Ref.
2018	11th Korea Drama Awards	Best Drama	My Mister	Nominated	
2018	11th Korea Drama Awards	Best Screenplay	Park Hae-young	Nominated	
2018	6th APAN Star Awards	Grand Prize	Lee Sun-kyun	Nominated	
2018	6th APAN Star Awards	Best Production Director	Kim Won-seok	Won	
2018	6th APAN Star Awards	Top Excellence Award, Actress in a Miniseries	Lee Ji-eun	Won	
2018	6th APAN Star Awards	Best Supporting Actor	Park Ho-san	Won	
2018	6th APAN Star Awards	Best New Actor	Jang Ki-yong	Won	
2018	6th APAN Star Awards	K-Star Award, Actress	Lee Ji-eun	Nominated	
2018	2nd The Seoul Awards	Grand Prize (Drama)	My Mister	Won	
2018	2nd The Seoul Awards	Best Actor	Lee Sun-kyun	Nominated	
2018	2nd The Seoul Awards	Best Supporting Actor	Park Ho-san	Nominated	
2018	2nd The Seoul Awards	Best New Actor	Jang Ki-yong	Nominated	
2018	MBC Plus X Genie Music Awards	OST Award	"Adult"	Nominated	
2018	31st Korean Broadcasting Writers' Awards	Writer Award (Drama Division)	Park Hae-young	Won	
2019	55th Baeksang Arts Awards	Best Drama	My Mister	Won	
2019	55th Baeksang Arts Awards	Best Director	Kim Won-seok	Nominated	
2019	55th Baeksang Arts Awards	Best Actor	Lee Sun-kyun	Nominated	
2019	55th Baeksang Arts Awards	Best Actress	Lee Ji-eun	Nominated	
2019	55th Baeksang Arts Awards	Best Supporting Actress	Oh Na-ra	Nominated	
2019	55th Baeksang Arts Awards	Best New Actress	Kwon Nara	Nominated	
2019	55th Baeksang Arts Awards	Best Screenplay	Park Hae-young	Won	
