= Chorokbaem Media =

South Korean television production company

Chorokbaem Media Co., Ltd.
- Chorokbaem Media logo
- Type: Public
- Traded as: KRX: 047820
- Industry: Entertainment and Media Production
- Founded: September 2000
- Headquarters: 310 (Yeoksam-dong), Bongeunsa-ro, Gangnam District, Seoul, South Korea
- Area served: South Korea
- Key people: Oh Min-soo (CEO); Kim Sang-heon (CEO)
- Products: Korean dramas and Animations
- Services: Production
- Revenue: 1,059,792,000 won (December 2016)
- Owner: DMG (Hong Kong) Group Ltd.: 13.25%; IOK Company Co. Ltd : 12.06%
- Number of employees: 50(2022)
- Subsidiaries: CRB Entertainment, SH Entertainment Group (Kim Jong-hak Production, A9 Media, Power M ENT Co., Ltd, TN Entertainment)

Korean name
- Hangul: 초록뱀미디어
- Lit.: Green Snake Media
- RR: Chorokbaem midieo
- MR: Ch'orokpaem midiŏ
- Website: chorokbaem.com

Chorokbaem Media (Korean: 초록뱀미디어; lit. 'Green Snake Media') is a Korean drama and animation production company.

== List of works ==
Year	Title	Program Format	Network	Notes
2001	The White Apartment	Chinese drama	HBS	Co-producer
2002	How Should I Be	Korean drama	SBS	—N/a
2003	Punch	Korean drama	SBS	—N/a
2003	My Fair Lady	Korean drama	SBS	—N/a
2003	All In	Korean drama	SBS	—N/a
2004	Phoenix	Korean drama	MBC	with Diamond Ogilvy Group
2004	New Human Market 2004	Korean drama	SBS	—N/a
2005	YAP	sitcom	TU Media DMB	—N/a
2005	Cute or Crazy	sitcom	SBS	—N/a
2006	High Kick!	sitcom	MBC	—N/a
2006	90 Days, Time to Love	Korean drama	MBC	—N/a
2006	Fireworks	Korean drama	MBC	—N/a
2006	Jumong	Korean drama	MBC	with Olive9
2006	Wolf	Korean drama	MBC	with Good EMG
2007	Que Sera, Sera	Korean drama	MBC	—N/a
2007	Lobbyist	Korean drama	SBS	with Korea Pictures International, Inc. and Yedang Entertainment
2008	Iljimae	Korean drama	SBS	—N/a
2008	The Kingdom of the Winds	Korean drama	KBS 2TV	—N/a
2008	East of Eden	Korean drama	MBC	with Core Contents Media and Jellybox
2009	East of Eden	Korean drama	MBC	with Core Contents Media and Jellybox
2009	Iljimae	animation	SBS	with OHW; based on the drama of the same name
2009	High Kick Through The Roof	sitcom	MBC	—N/a
2009	The Slave Hunters	Korean drama	KBS 2TV	—N/a
2010	Once Upon a Time in Saengchori	sitcom	tvN	—N/a
2011	Ojakgyo Family	Korean drama	KBS 2TV	—N/a
2011	High Kick: Revenge of the Short Legged	sitcom	MBC	—N/a
2011	2011 National Quiz Championship	game show	MBN	—N/a
2011	K-pop Star Season 1	reality show	SBS	with SBS Variety Unit
2012	Salamander Guru and The Shadows	sitcom	SBS	—N/a
2012	Standby	sitcom	MBC	—N/a
2012	Queen and I	Korean drama	tvN	—N/a
2012	K-pop Star Season 2	reality show	SBS	with SBS Variety Unit
2012	Jeon Woo-chi	Korean drama	KBS 2TV	—N/a
2013	Nine: Nine Time Travels	Korean drama	tvN	with JS Pictures
2013	Potato Star 2013QR3	sitcom	tvN	—N/a
2013	K-pop Star Season 3	reality show	SBS	with SBS Variety Unit
2014	Say I Love You	Taiwanese drama	CTV	with Chung T'ien Television and CN Plus Productions
2014	High School King of Savvy	Korean drama	tvN	—N/a
2014	The Three Musketeers	Korean drama	tvN	with JS Pictures
2014	K-pop Star Season 4	reality show	SBS	with SBS Variety Unit
2015	Heart to Heart	Korean drama	tvN	with Mega Monster
2015	The Producers	Korean drama	KBS 2TV	with The Producers S.P.C. and KBS Media
2015	Get It Gear	reality show	XTM	—N/a
2015	Oh My Ghost	Korean drama	tvN	—N/a
2015	K-pop Star Season 5	reality show	SBS	with SBS Variety Unit
2016	Another Miss Oh	Korean drama	tvN	with Studio Dragon
2016	W	Korean drama	MBC	—N/a
2016	Our Gap-soon	Korean drama	SBS	with Kim Jong-hak Production
2016	Weightlifting Fairy Kim Bok-joo	Korean drama	MBC	—N/a
2016	K-pop Star Season 6: The Last Chance	reality show	SBS	with SBS Variety Unit
2017	Duel	Korean drama	OCN	with Studio Dragon
2017	Hit the Top	Korean drama	KBS 2TV	with Hit the Top S.P.C. and Monster Union
2017	Shut Up and Smash	sitcom	TV Chosun	—N/a
2018	My Mister	Korean drama	tvN	with Studio Dragon
2018	Mistress	Korean drama	OCN	with Studio Dragon
2018	Familiar Wife	Korean drama	tvN	with Studio Dragon
2018	Memories of the Alhambra	Korean drama	tvN	with Studio Dragon
2019	Liver or Die	Korean drama	KBS 2TV	with Pan Entertainment
2019	Rookie Historian Goo Hae-ryung	Korean drama	MBC	—N/a
2019	X-Garion	Korean drama	Tooniverse	with Sonokong
2020	Find Me in Your Memory	Korean drama	MBC	—N/a
2020	The Penthouse: War in Life	Korean drama	SBS	with Studio S
2021	Love (ft. Marriage and Divorce) (season 1–2)	Korean drama	TV Chosun	with Jidam Inc.
2021	The Penthouse: War in Life (season 2)	Korean drama	SBS	with Studio S
2021	Revolutionary Sisters	Korean drama	KBS 2TV	with Pan Entertainment
2021	The Penthouse: War in Life (season 3)	Korean drama	SBS	with Studio S
2021	One Ordinary Day	Korean drama	Coupang Play	with Studio M and Gold Medalist
2022	Love (ft. Marriage and Divorce) (season 3)	Korean drama	TV Chosun	with Jidam Inc.
2022	My Liberation Notes	Korean drama	JTBC	with Studio Phoenix and JTBC Studios
2022	High School Dad	reality show	MBN; K-STAR	with Space Rabbit, Aurora Media and Contents Brick
2022	The Secret House	Korean drama	MBC	with MBC C&I
2022	Vengeance of the Bride	Korean drama	KBS 2TV	with DK E&M
2022	Red Balloon	Korean drama	TV Chosun	with Higround
2023	Pandora: Beneath the Paradise	Korean drama	tvN	with Studio Dragon
2023	The Escape of the Seven	Korean drama	SBS	with Studio S
2023	The Story of Park's Marriage Contract	Korean drama	MBC	—N/a
2023	Bad Memory Eraser	Korean drama		Kim Jong-hak Production
2024	Missing Crown Prince	Korean drama	MBN	with Superbook
2024	Begins ≠ Youth	Korean drama	Xclusive	with HYBE Corporation; post-production
2024	Bad Memory Eraser	Korean drama	MBN	with Studio Jidam and Kim Jong-hak Production
2025	The Potato Lab	Korean drama	tvN	—N/a
2025	Law and the City	Korean drama	tvN	—N/a
