= Another Miss Oh =

2016 South Korean television series

- Promotional poster (Note: The poster has Studio Dragon's former logo below.)
- Hangul: 또! 오해영
- Lit.: Another! Oh Hae-young
- RR: Tto! O Haeyeong
- MR: Tto! O Haeyŏng
- Genre: Romance; Drama
- Written by: Park Hae-young; Wi So-young
- Directed by: Song Hyun-wook; Lee Jong-jae
- Starring: Eric Mun; Seo Hyun-jin; Jeon Hye-bin
- Theme music composer: Eom Ki-yeop; Julie
- Opening theme: "What Is Love" by Seo Hyun-jin and Yoo Seung-woo
- Country of origin: South Korea
- Original language: Korean
- No. of episodes: 18 + 2 (special)

Production
- Executive producers: Park Ho-sik; Choi Jin-hee; Yoon Gi-tae
- Producer: Lee Sang-hee
- Running time: 70 minutes
- Production companies: Chorokbaem Media; Studio Dragon (Note: Studio Dragon is CJ E&M's drama production subsidiary founded in May 2016. Another Oh Hae-young is its debut production.)

Original release
- Network: tvN
- Release: May 2 – June 28, 2016

Another Miss Oh (Korean: 또! 오해영) is a South Korean drama starring Eric Mun, Seo Hyun-jin, Jeon Hye-bin. It replaced Pied Piper and broadcast on cable network tvN on Monday and Tuesday at 23:00 (KST) for 18 episodes from May 2 to June 28, 2016.

The series recorded the highest audience rating for a tvN Monday-Tuesday show and became one of the highest-rated Korean dramas in cable television history. The drama was extended by two episodes and specials each.

== Plot ==
Park Do-kyung (Eric Mun) is a sound director in his 30s. One year ago, his bride, Oh Hae-young (pretty) (Jeon Hye-bin), disappeared on their wedding day, leaving him miserable. One year after that incident, Do-kyung was told that Hae-young is going to marry a young entrepreneur named Han Tae-jin (Lee Jae-yoon). He sought revenge by sabotaging Tae-jin's business, leaving him bankrupt as well. However, Oh Hae-young (just/"그냥") (Seo Hyun-jin) was actually just a stranger who happens to have the same name as the other Oh Hae-young (pretty) who left him. Coincidentally, Oh Hae-young (just) is the girl that Do-kyung had been seeing in his visions. He sees snapshots of the future with her there.

Tae-jin was about to be sent to jail due to bankruptcy. As a result, before his imprisonment, he met his fiancée, Hae-young (just). Tae-jin tells her that he does not love her enough to marry her and wants to postpone their wedding. In fact, Tae-jin was lying and his true intentions was to let her go so that she will gain happiness. Amid the situation, the lives of Do-kyung and Hae-young (just) turn as they cross paths. After sharing similar unfortunate experiences of being dumped before their weddings, the two of them got even closer.

== Cast ==
=== Main ===
- Eric Mun as Park Do-kyung

A 36-year-old man, he is a sound director. He has a very reserved and aloof personality and is intimate and meticulous with his work. He is unable to forget his ex-girlfriend, Oh Hae-young (pretty), who disappeared on the day of their wedding. After he mistook Oh Hae-young (just) for Hae-young (pretty), Do-kyung keeps seeing visions that are always related to Hae-young (just) as if he sees the future. He falls in love with Hae-young (just) but knows he doesn't deserve her, because he was the one who ruined her wedding with her ex-fiancé, Han Tae-jin.

- Seo Hyun-jin as Oh Hae-young (just/"그냥")

A 32-year-old woman who works as product planning team representative of the catering division of her company. Her life got ruined after her ex-fiancé Tae-jin dumped her the day before their wedding, and as a result she becomes the main topic of gossip because of it. She describes herself as a pitiful and unlucky person but is cheered up by Do-kyung and eventually becomes attracted to him. Meanwhile, she is clueless that Do-kyung is the person who ruined her wedding. Due to having the same name as the beautiful and perfect Oh Hae-young (pretty), she is always compared and feels small.

- Jeon Hye-bin as Oh Hae-young (pretty)

A 32-year-old woman who is the TF team leader of the catering division Oh Hae-young (just) works in. She also is Do-kyung's ex-lover who ditched their wedding and left for Europe. After one year, she still loves him and decided to come back to him. She comes from a wealthy family with many marriage issues, where her mother and father marry and divorce back-and-forth, and has many step-siblings. She always appears cheerful in front everyone in order to hide her true self who lacks love from her parents.

=== Supporting ===
==== People around Park Do-kyung ====
- Ye Ji-won as Park Soo-kyung

A 44-year-old woman, she is the catering division director and Do-kyung's older sister. She is an alcoholic who always babbles in French when she gets drunk and has a habit of falling for any man whom she ever sleeps with. Hae-young (just) and her other subordinates give her the nickname "Isadora" ("isa" = two four (24) and "dora" = "running around" meaning she is around at all times) because of her habit of constantly checking up on her subordinates.

- Kim Ji-seok as Lee Jin-sang, a 36-year-old lawyer who is Do-kyung's friend. He is the first person who mistook Hae-Young (just) for Hae-young (pretty) and persuaded Do-kyung to seek revenge. Jin-sang convinced to stay in Do-kyung's house for a while to protect himself from dangerous people that are related to the case he is handling. In reality, Jin-sang is hiding from the husband of a woman who recently seduced him.
- Heo Jung-min as Park Hoon, Do-kyung's 33-year-old younger brother who works as a sound recording studio staff. Although they have the same last name, Do-kyung and Hoon are not actually biological siblings: Do-kyung and Soo-kyung are from the maternal side, while Hoon is from the paternal side. He seems to be frustrated with his step-brother, and they do not get along with each other often and share different opinions. He always gets crazy while searching for a girlfriend.
- Nam Gi-ae as Heo Ji-ya, Do-kyung's 63-year-old mother who works as a film producer. She is a gold digger who only cares about living a luxurious life and always asks Do-kyung for money, but never pays him back. She was against Do-kyung's marriage to Hae-young (pretty) as she knew Do-kyung would not give her money once he gets married. For this purpose, she emotionally and psychologically tortures Hae-young (pretty) into running away on the day of their wedding.

==== People around Oh Hae-young (just/"그냥") ====
- Lee Jae-yoon as Han Tae-jin, the 36-year-old ex-fiancé of Hae-young (just) who works as an entrepreneur. He decides to call off their wedding and dumps Hae-young (just) in order to let her live happily. Not long after he dumped her, Tae-jin went to jail because of the bankruptcy. He is curious as to why Do-kyung decided to destroy his business as they never met each other previously. Even after he walks out from jail, he still has feelings for his ex-fiancé, Hae-young (just).
- Lee Han-wi as Oh Kyung-soo, the 60-year-old father of Hae-young (just). He is talented in cooking and seems to be more patient and calm than Hae-young (just)'s mother.
- Kim Mi-kyung as Hwang Deok-yi, the 57-year-old mother of Hae-young (just). She feels pressured after her daughter called off her wedding, as her friends in the neighborhood keep talking about her daughter behind her back. Deok-yi has a weird habit of taking off her clothes when she is angry.
- Ha Shi-eun as Kim Hee-ran, Hae-young (just)'s best friend who works as a film producer. Thanks to her, Do-kyung and Hae-young (just) meet for the first time in person. She has been Hae-young (just)'s sole dependable friend since their high school days. Even though both of them are close, Hee-ran is popular with boys unlike Hae-young (just).
- Lee Hye-eun as Jeong-sook, Hae-young (just)'s aunt who used to help with housework often. However, after Hae-young (just) canceled her marriage, she became annoying and often argues with Deok-yi.

==== People around Oh Hae-young (pretty) ====
- Kim Seo-ra as Hae-young (pretty)'s mother

==== Extended ====
- Heo Young-ji as Anna Yoon, a 21-year-old part-time staff of a convenience store and Hoon's girlfriend. Anna seems to not want to get married during her lifetime. During their 100th day anniversary, she wants the both of them to live together, but Hoon constantly rejects her idea because they are an unmarried couple.
- Kang Nam-gil as chairman Jang, a 74-year-old chairman and Hae-young (pretty)'s step-father, as Hae-young (pretty)'s mother was once married to him but eventually got divorced.
- Choi Byung-mo as Park Soon-taek, Do-kyung's psychiatrist and the only person who knows about his visions that are related to Hae-young (just).
- Kwon Min as Kim Seong-jin – Hae-young (just)'s workshop colleague

The leader of the catering division "Seasonal Table" team

- Kim Ki-doo as Gi-tae, a sound engineer.
- Jo Hyun-sik as Sang-seok, a sound engineer.
- Choi Joon-ho as Lee Joon, a sound engineer
- Kwon Soo-hyun
- Shin Woo-gyeom as Ji-hoon
- Lee Ga-hyun as Shim Ye-jin, a member of the catering division "Seasonal Table" team.
- Yoo Se-rye as Chan-joo, a member of the catering division "Seasonal Table" team.
- Kim Jong-gook as officer of the catering division
- Baek Joon as Jung Woo-sung, a member of the catering division "Seasonal Table" team.
- Kim Moon-hak as Kim Moon-hak, a member of the catering division "Seasonal Table" team.
- Hwang Chang-do as Hwang Chang-do, a member of the catering division "Seasonal Table" team.
- Jo Seong-hyuk as Hae-young's high school alumni
- Park Myung-hoon as Lee Chan-soo, Tae-jin's friend partner.
- Yeon Mi-joo as Jang Young-ji, Chairman Jang's daughter.

=== Others ===
- Ko Kyu-pil as Chinese restaurant's deliveryman
- Son Young-soon as Hae-young (just)'s grandmother
- Han Tae-il as Do-kyung's house owner
- Kim Kyung-jin as "Divorce, Not Marriage" scenario writer, Heo Ji-ya's employee

=== Special appearances ===
- Ahn Il-kwon as film director (ep. 1)
- Lee Hyun-jin as Hae-young (just)'s blind date (ep. 1)
- Yoon Jong-hoon as Choi Noo-ri, Hae-young's high school alumni (ep. 2–3)
- Yeon Woo-jin as lawyer Gong Gi-tae (ep. 7)
- Im Ha-ryong as hero of the film "Another Productivity" (ep. 9)
- Lee Pil-mo as Do-kyung's father at the youth time (ep. 10)
- Lee Yu-ri as Heo Ji-ya at the youth time (ep. 10)
- Lee Byung-joon as Lee Byung-joon – singer, worry counselor (ep. 12–18)
- Kim Shin-young as Kim Shin-young – "Kim Shin-young's Morning Coffee" radio show host (ep. 12)
- Lee Sun-bin as Jin-sang's Monday girlfriend (ep. 14)
- Woo Hyun as Woo Hyeon – Park Soon-taek's senior (ep. 15–18)
- Seo Jun-young as Hae-young (pretty)'s blind date (ep. 15)
- Seo Yea-ji as Oh Seo-hee – Hae-young (just)'s younger cousin (ep. 15)
- Oh Man-seok as Oh Man-seok – film director (ep. 18)

== Original soundtrack ==
=== Part 1 ===
No.	Title	Artist	Length
1.	"Little Miss Sunshine (사르르)"	Wable	2:47
2.	"Little Miss Sunshine (사르르)" (Inst.)		2:47
Total length:			5:34

=== Part 2 ===
No.	Title	Artist	Length
1.	"Just Like a Dream (꿈처럼)"	Ben	3:46
2.	"Just Like a Dream (꿈처럼)" (Inst.)		3:46
Total length:			7:32

=== Part 3 ===
No.	Title	Artist	Length
1.	"What Is Love (사랑이 뭔데)"	Seo Hyun-jin and Yoo Seung-woo	3:33
2.	"What Is Love (사랑이 뭔데)" (Inst.)		3:33
Total length:			7:06

=== Part 4 ===
No.	Title	Artist	Length
1.	"Maybe I (어쩌면 나)"	Roy Kim	3:30
2.	"Maybe I (어쩌면 나)" (Inst.)		3:30
Total length:			7:00

=== Part 5 ===
No.	Title	Artist	Length
1.	"If It Is You (너였다면)"	Jung Seung-hwan	4:33
2.	"If It Is You (너였다면)" (Inst.)		4:33
Total length:			9:06

=== Part 6 ===
No.	Title	Artist	Length
1.	"I'll Be There"	Lee Seok-hoon (SG Wannabe)	3:51
2.	"I'll Be There" (Inst.)		3:51
Total length:			7:42

=== Part 7 ===
No.	Title	Artist	Length
1.	"As I've Waited, More (기다린 만큼, 더)"	The Black Skirts	4:29
2.	"As I've Waited, More (기다린 만큼, 더)" (Inst.)		4:29
Total length:			8:58

=== Part 8 ===
No.	Title	Artist	Length
1.	"Scattered (흩어져)"	Kim EZ (GGot Jam Project)	4:01
2.	"Scattered (흩어져)" (Inst.)		4:01
Total length:			8:02

Title	Year	Peak chart positions	Sales	Streaming counts	Remarks
Title	Year	Gaon	Sales	Streaming counts	Remarks
"Just Like a Dream" (Ben)	2016	6	KOR: 993,525+	KOR: 49,138,331+	Part 2
"What Is Love" (Seo Hyun-jin and Yoo Seung-woo)	2016	6	KOR: 705,741+	KOR: 32,029,739+	Part 3
"Maybe I" (Roy Kim)	2016	11	KOR: 352,245+	KOR: 13,095,774+	Part 4
"If It Is You" (Jung Seung-hwan)	2016	7	KOR: 1,996,437+	KOR: 113,279,838+	Part 5
"I'll Be There" (Lee Seok-hoon (SG Wannabe))	2016	49	KOR: 75,492+	KOR: 1,531,600+	Part 6
"As I've Waited, More" (The Black Skirts)	2016	21	KOR: 135,427+	KOR: 5,732,151+	Part 7
"Scattered" (Kim EZ (GGot Jam Project))	2016	49	KOR: 37,619+	No data	Part 8
"—" denotes releases that did not chart or were not released in that region.

== Ratings ==
Average TV viewership ratings
Ep.	Original broadcast date	Title	Average audience share		
Ep.	Original broadcast date	Title	Nielsen Korea		TNmS
Ep.	Original broadcast date	Title	Nationwide	Seoul	Nationwide
1	May 2, 2016	Can I Cry? (울어도 되나요)	2.059%	2.796%	1.8%
2	May 3, 2016	A Relationship Completely Unplanned (미필적 고의에 의한 인연)	2.981%	4.311%	2.6%
3	May 9, 2016	Love If You Want to Live (살고싶을 땐, 사랑하기로)	2.996%	3.038%	3.9%
4	May 10, 2016	Let's Hum a Song and Go Home (콧노래를 사서 집으로 가자)	4.253%	5.201%	4.7%
5	May 16, 2016	The Suffering Heart to Frenzy (미치게 짠한)	5.031%	6.276%	4.9%
6	May 17, 2016	A Half Love, a Half Mercy (사랑 반, 측은 반)	6.068%	7.746%	5.4%
7	May 23, 2016	I Wish I Was the Only Woman in the World (세상에 여자는 나 하나였으면 좋겠어)	6.604%	8.038%	6.7%
8	May 24, 2016	I'm Not Crying Because of Him, I'm Crying Because of You (그 때문에 우는 게 아니야 너 때문에 우는 거야)	7.798%	9.386%	6.7%
9	May 30, 2016	The Wind Blew in That Heart (그 마음에 바람이 불었다)	7.990%	9.924%	7.1%
10	May 31, 2016	The Way to Go to You (너에게 가는 길)	8.425%	10.983%	7.2%
11	June 6, 2016	Pain, Sick and ... (아프고 아프고 ...)	9.022%	11.869%	7.9%
12	June 7, 2016	I Hope You to Be Unhappy Leaving Me (나 떠나 부디 불행하길)	9.353%	12.028%	7.8%
13	June 13, 2016	A Heart That Was Understood (헤아려 본 마음)	8.507%	10.506%	7.9%
14	June 14, 2016	All Sounds Except Love Should Be Silent (사랑이 아닌 모든 소리는 침묵하라)	8.836%	11.458%	8.1%
15	June 20, 2016	Those Days We Couldn't Love Much More (더더더 사랑 못한 지난날들)	7.929%	10.686%	7.4%
16	June 21, 2016	It Becomes Livable Because of You (너로 인해 살아진다)	8.027%	10.503%	7.7%
17	June 27, 2016	Enough Not to Care About Dying Today (오늘 죽어도 좋을만큼)	8.028%	10.310%	7.0%
18	June 28, 2016	Please Stay Alive. I'm Grateful That You're Alive, Dear. (살아주십시오 살아있어서 고마운 그대)	9.991%	13.428%	8.1%
Average			6.883%	8.805%	6.3%
Special	July 4, 2016		3.480%	4.198%	2.4%
Special	July 5, 2016		2.892%	3.334%	2.3%
In the table above, the blue numbers represent the lowest published ratings and the red numbers represent the highest published ratings.; This series aired on a cable channel/pay TV which normally has a relatively smaller audience compared to free-to-air TV/public broadcasters (KBS, SBS, MBC, and EBS).

== Awards and nominations ==
Year	Award	Category	Recipient	Result
2016	5th APAN Star Awards	Excellence Award, Actor in a Miniseries	Eric Mun	Nominated
2016	5th APAN Star Awards	Excellence Award, Actress in a Miniseries	Seo Hyun-jin	Won
2016	5th APAN Star Awards	Best Supporting Actress	Jeon Hye-bin	Nominated
2016	5th APAN Star Awards	Best Supporting Actress	Ye Ji-won	Won
2016	5th APAN Star Awards	Best Couple Award	Eric Mun and Seo Hyun-jin	Nominated
2016	9th Korea Drama Awards	Top Excellence Award, Actress	Seo Hyun-jin	Nominated
2016	tvN10 Awards	Best Actor	Eric Mun	Nominated
2016	tvN10 Awards	Best Actress	Seo Hyun-jin	Nominated
2016	tvN10 Awards	Best Content Award, Drama	Another Miss Oh	Won
2016	tvN10 Awards	Romantic-Comedy King	Eric Mun	Won
2016	tvN10 Awards	Romantic-Comedy Queen	Seo Hyun-jin	Won
2016	tvN10 Awards	Made in tvN, Actress in Drama	Seo Hyun-jin	Won
2016	tvN10 Awards	Two Star Award	Kim Ji-seok	Nominated
2016	tvN10 Awards	Scene-Stealer Award, Actor	Kim Ji-seok	Nominated
2016	tvN10 Awards	Scene-Stealer Award, Actress	Kim Mi-kyung	Nominated
2016	tvN10 Awards	Scene-Stealer Award, Actress	Ye Ji-won	Nominated
2016	tvN10 Awards	Best Kiss Award	Kim Ji-seok and Ye Ji-won	7th place
2016	tvN10 Awards	Best Kiss Award	Eric Mun and Seo Hyun-jin	2nd place
2017	11th Cable TV Broadcasting Awards	Cable Star Award – Scene-Stealer	Ye Ji-won	Won
2017	11th Cable TV Broadcasting Awards	Cable Star Award – Popular Star	Kim Ji-seok	Won
2017	11th Cable TV Broadcasting Awards	Cable Star Award – Best Couple	Kim Ji-seok and Ye Ji-won	Won
2017	53rd Baeksang Arts Awards	Best Director	Song Hyun-wook	Nominated
2017	53rd Baeksang Arts Awards	Best Screenplay	Park Hae-young	Nominated
2017	53rd Baeksang Arts Awards	Best Actress	Seo Hyun-jin	Won
