= Park Shin-woo =

South Korean director

- Born: South Korea
- Occupation: Television director
- Years active: 2012–present
- Employer: Next Scene

Korean name
- Hangul: 박신우
- RR: Bak Sinu
- MR: Pak Sinu

Park Shin-woo (Korean: 박신우) is South Korean television director. He is known for directing tvN television series Encounter (2018–2019), It's Okay to Not Be Okay (2020), and Our Unwritten Seoul (2025). For directing It's Okay to Not Be Okay, he was nominated for Best TV Movie or Miniseries at the 49th International Emmy Awards.

== Career ==
=== Beginnings in SBS ===
Park started his career in SBS and worked as an assistant director for Kim Hyung-shik in the drama Phantom in 2012. He continued as an assistant director for Jo Young-kwang in King of Ambition in 2013.

After gaining experience as an assistant director, Park made his directorial debut in the SBS Lunar Special Drama Wonderful Day in October in 2014, collaborating with assistant director Park Bo-ram. The drama was inspired by the song "One Fine Day in October" by Kim Dong-gyu and Jo Soo-mi. The story revolves around poet Lee Shin-jae (played by Lee Deok-hwa), a stubborn husband, and his loving wife Kang Yoon-geum (played by Kim Hae-sook) in their final years of a couple's life and the husband's journey to fulfill his wife's bucket list.

Park went on to direct the dramas Angel Eyes (2014). Followd by collaborating with writer Seo Sook-hyang in drama Don't Dare to Dream (2016). He left SBS in 2017.

=== Studio Dragon and Next Scene ===
In July 2018, it was reported that Park will be directing his first drama for tvN, Encounter. Produced by Bon Factory, it starred Song Hye-kyo and Park Bo-gum. It ran from November 28, 2018, to January 24, 2019, every Wednesday and Thursday at 21:30 (KST). It is one of the highest-rated Korean dramas in cable television history.

Park worked with screenwriter Jo Yong for tvN series It's Okay to Not Be Okay. It was planned by Studio Dragon and produced by Story TV and Gold Medalist. Jo Yong based the drama on her relationship with a man who had a personality disorder. The series received many accolades, including a nomination for Best TV Movie or Miniseries at 49th International Emmy Awards. Park delved into directing streaming series with Lovestruck in the City. Starring Ji Chang-wook and Kim Ji-won, the series portrays the love stories of young people navigating life in a busy city. As the first instalment in the multi-part City Couple's Way of Love project, it premiered on KakaoTV on December 22, 2020, and was released every Tuesday and Friday at 17:00 (KST). It is also available internationally on Netflix.

In 2021, Park and director Oh Chung-hwan co-founded Next Scene, a drama production company. Studio Dragon announced on March 28, 2022, that it had signed an equity investment contract with Next Scene, securing a 19.98% stake. In April 2025, Studio Dragon acquired 8,002 shares of Next Scene for 16 billion won, making Next Scene a wholly owned subsidiary.

On November 18, 2021, it was announced that Park had collaborated with writer Seo Sook-hyang on a drama tentatively titled Ask the Stars. Lee Min-ho and Gong Hyo-jin were confirmed as the lead actors on March 28, 2022. This marked Park's reunion with writer Seo and actress Gong for the second time after the drama Don't Dare to Dream. Filming began in April 2022, and wrapped up on February 8, 2023. The series depicts the serendipitous meeting of a space tourist and an astronaut on a space station. The English title of the drama When the Stars Gossip was revealed in 2025. It was broadcast on tvN every Saturday and Sunday at 21:20 (KST) from January 4 to February 23, 2025, and also available for streaming on Netflix in selected regions.

His next work Our Unwritten Seoul was initially a KBS drama. KBS then approached Studio Dragon to co-produce the series and signed a MOU with CJ ENM, transferring the drama to tvN. The series was planned by Studio Dragon and co-produced by Monster Union, Higround, and Next Scene. Park's involvement and writer Lee Kang of Youth of May (2021) were reported in December 2024.

== Filmography ==
=== Series ===
Key
| † | Denotes television productions that have not yet been released |

Park Shin-woo's drama credit
| Year | Title | | Network | Credited as | | | Ref. |
| Year | English | Korean | Network | Assistant director | Director | Producer | Ref. |
|---|---|---|---|---|---|---|---|
| 2012 | Phantom | 유령 | SBS | Yes | —N/a | | |
| 2013 | King of Ambition | 야왕 | SBS | Yes | —N/a | | |
| 2014 | Wonderful Day in October | 시월의 어느 멋진 날에 | SBS | Park Bo-ram | Yes | —N/a | |
| 2014 | Angel Eyes | 엔젤 아이즈 | SBS | —N/a | Yes | —N/a | |
| 2016 | Don't Dare to Dream | 질투의 화신 | SBS | —N/a | Co-directing (Note: Park Shin-woo (Ep. 1–24) and Lee Jung-heum (Ep. 5–24)) | —N/a | |
| 2018–2019 | Encounter | 남자친구 | tvN | —N/a | Yes | —N/a | |
| 2020 | It's Okay to Not Be Okay | 사이코지만 괜찮아 | tvN | —N/a | Yes | —N/a | |
| 2020–2021 | Lovestruck in the City | 도시남녀의 사랑법 | Kakao TV | —N/a | Yes | —N/a | |
| 2023 | Delightfully Deceitful | 이로운 사기 | tvN | —N/a | | Yes | |
| 2025 | When the Stars Gossip | 별들에게 물어봐 | tvN | —N/a | Yes | —N/a | |
| 2025 | Our Unwritten Seoul | 미지의 서울 | tvN | —N/a | Yes | —N/a | |
| 2026 | My Ghostly Running Mate † | 의원님이 보우하사 | tvN | —N/a | Yes | —N/a | |

== Accolades ==
List of awards and nominations received by Park
| Award ceremony | Year | Category | Work(s) / Nominee(s) | Result | Ref. |
|---|---|---|---|---|---|
| APAN Star Awards | 2021 | Best Drama | It's Okay to Not Be Okay | Nominated | |
| APAN Star Awards | 2025 | Best Drama | Our Unwritten Seoul | Nominated | |
| APAN Star Awards | 2025 | Best Director | Our Unwritten Seoul | Nominated | |
| Asia Contents Awards & Global OTT Awards | 2025 | Best Creative | Our Unwritten Seoul | Nominated | |
| Baeksang Arts Awards | 2021 | Best Drama | It's Okay to Not Be Okay | Nominated | |
| Baeksang Arts Awards | 2021 | Best Director – Television | It's Okay to Not Be Okay | Nominated | |
| Baeksang Arts Awards | 2026 | Best Director – Television | Our Unwritten Seoul | Won | |
| Bechdel Day | 2025 | Bechdel Choice 10 | Our Unwritten Seoul | Placed | |
| Cine21 Film Awards | 2025 | Series of the Year | Our Unwritten Seoul | Won | |
| Daejeon Visual Art Tech Awards | 2020 | Visual of the Year Award (Special Video) | It's Okay to Not Be Okay | Won | |
| FUNdex Awards | 2025 | Best TV Drama | Our Unwritten Seoul | Nominated | |
| International Emmy Awards | 2021 | Best TV Movie or Miniseries | It's Okay to Not Be Okay | Nominated | |
| Korean Academy of Theater Arts | 2020 | Art of the Year Award | It's Okay to Not Be Okay | Won | |
| Korea Drama Awards | 2025 | Best Drama | Our Unwritten Seoul | Nominated | |
