= Criminal Justice (British TV series) =

British television series (2008–2009)

- Genre: Thriller; Drama; Legal drama
- Written by: Peter Moffat
- Starring: Ben Whishaw (2008); Maxine Peake (2009)
- Country of origin: United Kingdom
- Original language: English
- No. of series: 2
- No. of episodes: 10

Production
- Executive producer: Hilary Salmon
- Producers: Pier Wilkie (2008); Steve Lightfoot (2009)
- Running time: 60 minutes
- Production company: BBC Productions

Original release
- Network: BBC One
- Release: 30 June 2008 – 9 October 2009

Related
- The Night Of (2016); Criminal Justice (2019); One Ordinary Day (2021)

Criminal Justice is a British television drama series produced by the BBC and first shown in 2008. Written by Peter Moffat, each five-episode series follows the journey of an individual through the justice system and was first broadcast over five successive nights on BBC One. The first series, first shown in 2008, starred Ben Whishaw as Ben Coulter, a young man who is accused of murder after a drunken and drug-filled night out, though is unable to remember committing the crime. It was directed by Otto Bathurst and Luke Watson. In 2009, the second series featured Maxine Peake as troubled housewife Juliet Miller whose husband was stabbed in their bed. Yann Demange and Marc Jobst directed the second series. The first series won two British Academy Television Awards for Best Drama Serial and Best Writer, three Royal Television Society Awards and an International Emmy. The first season has been re-made into an HBO miniseries The Night Of, an Indian Hindi-language series also called Criminal Justice, and a South Korean series titled One Ordinary Day.

== Series one ==
The first series was composed of five episodes, which were broadcast nightly from 30 June to 4 July 2008 on BBC One. The first series starred Ben Whishaw as Ben Coulter, a young man who is accused of murder after a drunken and drug-filled night out, though is unable to remember committing the crime. As well as Whishaw, the show starred Pete Postlethwaite, Con O'Neill, Lindsay Duncan, David Westhead, Ruth Negga and Bill Paterson.

=== Overview ===
Ben Coulter takes his parents' black cab out for the night. At a traffic light, a young woman gets into the cab. Despite telling her he does not take fares, she insists on going to the seaside. While there, she offers Ben ecstasy, which he accepts. The pair go back to her house, and after sleeping together, Ben awakes downstairs, seeing a knife on the table at which he was sleeping. He goes upstairs to find the girl dead, with a stab wound to the chest. Police stop Ben after he crashes the taxi in shock. They later find he matches a description given by a neighbour, who saw Ben break into the girl's house to wipe his DNA off the house. They also find a knife in Ben's pocket. He is arrested on suspicion of murder. He is later charged and refused bail.

Ben spends his first day in prison. He seeks protection after being beaten up by Milroy, a feared jailbird. In return for being protected, Ben must smuggle an item past the prison guard. He also re-employs his former lawyer. This episode sees the first appearance of Vineeta Rishi as Frances Kapoor, who becomes his new barrister.

He shares his cell mostly with Hooch, who has the status of "Listener" in the prison. His advice and support to Ben are marred by his own limitations and ties. Finally he makes the sacrifice to open the path to Ben's release and his own absolution.

Ben's expensive new barrister persuades him to plead self-defence despite his misgivings, he then takes to the witness box before returning to prison and getting into a brawl. Ben's barrister, Frances Kapoor, appears to be the only person who believes Ben's pleas of innocence and so tries to free him. However, Ben's solicitor persuades him to appeal on the grounds of inappropriate relationship with his (female) barrister, therefore perhaps ruining Frances' career as a barrister. Ben is freed when CCTV evidence is eventually released of a man who committed another murder in the area on the same night chasing the girl Ben is accused of killing. He also got help from Hooch who demanded the name of the real murderer from another prisoner. Ben wants to withdraw the chamber's inquiry against Frances, but his solicitor says it is too late, as the ball is already rolling, and Ben should get on with his life.

=== Cast and crew ===
Character	Description	Actor
Ben Coulter	Young man, accused of murder after a night out	Ben Whishaw
Barry Coulter	Ben's father	David Westhead
Mary Coulter	Ben's mother	Juliet Aubrey
Hooch	Ben's cell mate	Pete Postlethwaite
Freddie Graham	Prison gang leader	David Harewood
Milroy	Prison inmate	Ian Peck
Melanie Lloyd	The murder victim	Ruth Negga
Frances Kapoor	Ben's junior defence barrister	Vineeta Rishi
Ralph Stone	Ben's solicitor	Con O'Neill
Harry Box	Police Detective Superintendent	Bill Paterson
Alison Slaughter	Ben's senior defence barrister	Lindsay Duncan

The series was written by Peter Moffat, and produced by Pier Wilkie. Otto Bathurst directed the first three episodes, with Luke Watson directing the final two.

=== Ratings ===
Date	Episode	Viewers (millions)
30 June 2008	1	5.62
1 July 2008	2	4.67
2 July 2008	3	5.35
3 July 2008	4	5.06
4 July 2008	5	5.10

=== Reception ===
The first series was generally praised by critics, The Sunday Telegraph calling it "nerve-shreddingly exciting". However, the series received complaints from lawyers and solicitors over the way they were portrayed over the five episodes – the character of Stone (played by Con O'Neill) being particularly controversial for his attitude, saying that, in the criminal justice system, "the truth can go to hell".

== Series two ==
A second series of the drama was commissioned by the BBC and was broadcast from 5–9 October 2009 as part of the BBC's autumn drama line-up. It returned with another five episodes, starring Maxine Peake as Juliet Miller. The series follows Juliet as she struggles to lead a normal life and, after stabbing her abusive husband, following her trial through the criminal justice system. Matthew Macfadyen plays Joe, a barrister at the height of his professional powers. He is married to Juliet who is fragile and isolated at home. They have one daughter, 13-year-old Ella, played by Alice Sykes. Other cast members include Sophie Okonedo, Denis Lawson, Steven MacKintosh, Eddie Marsan, Zoe Telford and Kate Hardie.

=== Overview ===
Juliet prepares for her husband, Joe's, return from work. He arrives with flowers and greets wife and daughter but both seem jumpy. Unsettling clues as to what might be going on are revealed and that night, Juliet stabs Joe. She calls the emergency services but leaves the house and her daughter finds Joe seriously injured and removes the knife, before being instructed not to. The police and paramedics take Joe to hospital and Ella is taken to the police station. Juliet eventually arrives at the hospital where Joe is in intensive care, and is arrested. While in custody, she behaves abnormally, leading her solicitor to question her mental state, but she admits stabbing Joe in a second interview, without her solicitor.

Juliet's solicitor asks that Juliet be released on bail but this is refused due to fears of her absconding or attempting contact with Ella and/or Joe. Ella goes into emergency care but soon moves in with her best friend's family, suffering nightmares about the way she found Joe. She visits Juliet in prison but the visit only makes matters worse, thanks to Juliet's lack of remorse. Her solicitor tries to get Juliet to talk about her and Joe's marriage but get nowhere so her legal team try prompting her. They question if she was raped but that is revealed not to be the case and that she is pregnant. Only after Juliet gives birth to her second daughter amid fears of separation does she open up about her marriage.

Joe's condition, meanwhile, worsens and he dies in hospital. Juliet is charged with murder but pleads not guilty, due to provocation. She is found not guilty after revealing the domestic abuse she suffered at Joe's hands but does, however, plead guilty to manslaughter.

=== Cast and crew ===
Character	Description	Actor
Juliet Miller	Fragile and isolated wife	Maxine Peake
Joe Miller	Successful barrister	Matthew Macfadyen
Ella Miller	Daughter to Joe and Juliet	Alice Sykes
Jackie Woolf	Juliet's solicitor	Sophie Okonedo
Anna Klein	Criminal barrister, defending Juliet	Zoe Telford
Bill Faber	Detective Chief Inspector, leading the police investigation	Denis Lawson
Chris Sexton	Detective Inspector, assisting Faber with the investigation	Steven MacKintosh
Flo Sexton	Detective Sergeant, married to Sexton	Kate Hardie
Norma	Social worker	Nadine Marshall
Joao	Prison Inmate	Imdad Miah
Saul	Clerk, former assistant to Joe Miller and Ella's godfather	Eddie Marsan
Carmen	Colombian Drug Mule, prisoner	Marie-France Alvarez

Peter Moffat wrote the series, with Steve Lightfoot producing. Yann Demange directed the first three episodes, with Marc Jobst directing the final two.

=== Ratings ===
Date	Episode	Viewers (millions)
5 October 2009	1	4.94
6 October 2009	2	5.24
7 October 2009	3	4.84
8 October 2009	4	4.77
9 October 2009	5	5.06

=== Reception ===
The second series also garnered a positive reception from critics. John Preston of The Telegraph praised the first episode for successfully ratcheting up the tension with "Hitchcockian precision", and how writer Peter Moffat allowed "the weight of the character's dilemmas to drive the narrative forward". He also acclaimed Maxine Peake's performance as a "marvel".

In The Independent Brian Viner hailed the serial as a "well written" and "superbly acted" drama, and noted Moffat's script as "particularly clever" in how it "manipulated [audience] sympathies".

== Awards and nominations ==
Series One

- British Academy Television Awards 2008
  - Won Best Drama Serial
  - Won Best Writer – Peter Moffat
  - Nominated Best Actor – Ben Whishaw
  - Nominated Best Director (Fiction/Entertainment) – Otto Bathurst
  - Nominated Best Editing (Fiction/Entertainment) – Sarah Brewerton
- International Emmy Awards 2009
  - Won Best Performance by an Actor – Ben Whishaw
- Royal Television Society Awards 2008
  - Nominated Best Drama Serial
  - Won Best Actor (Male) – Ben Whishaw
  - Nominated Best Writer – Peter Moffat
- Royal Television Society Craft & Design Awards 2008
  - Won Best Music (Original Score) – John Lunn
  - Won Best Tape & Film Editing (Drama) – Sarah Brewerton
  - Nominated Best Sound (Drama) – Billy Quinn

Series Two

- British Academy Television Awards 2009
  - Won Supporting Actor – Matthew MacFadyen

== DVD releases ==
The first series of Criminal Justice is available on DVD. Series Two was released on 28 December 2009. Both titles are distributed by Acorn Media UK.

== International adaptations ==
=== American adaptation ===
An eight-episode miniseries produced by HBO debuted on 10 July 2016. In the adaptation, John Turturro portrays New York City lawyer John Stone, and the Pakistani-American murder suspect is played by Riz Ahmed.

=== Indian adaptation ===
An Indian series based on Criminal Justice was released on Hotstar Specials on 5 April 2019. It is directed by Tigmanshu Dhulia and Vishal Furia starring Jackie Shroff, Pankaj Tripathi, Vikrant Massey, Anupriya Goenka and Mita Vashist in lead roles. Background Score given by Sameer Phaterpekar. The official trailer of the series was launched by Hotstar Specials on 28 March 2019. The description accompanying the trailer reads, “A one night stand turns into a nightmare for Aditya when he wakes up with blood on his hands."

=== South Korean adaptation ===
On January 5, 2021, it was announced that Studio M, Chorokbaem Media and Gold Medalist will co-produce a South Korean adaptation of Criminal Justice. Kim Soo-hyun and Cha Seung-won are set to star, Kwon Soon-kyu will write the project, and Lee Myung-woo will direct. BBC Studios confirmed the adaptation on January 13, through its media centre. The series premiered on Coupang Play on 27 November 2021 in South Korea and in other Asian markets on Viu.

=== French adaptation ===
A six-episode adaptation titled Une Si Longue Nuit (literally A Really Long Night) starring among others Mathilde Seigner and Jean-Pierre Darroussin was released on French streaming service Salto on 20 December 2021, preceding a TV broadcast on La Une in Belgium starting on 2 January 2022 and on TF1 in France starting on 20 January 2022.
