= It's Okay to Not Be Okay =

2020 South Korean television series

- Promotional poster
- Hangul: 사이코지만 괜찮아
- Lit.: Psycho but It's Okay
- RR: Saikojiman gwaenchana
- MR: Saik'ojiman kwaench'ana
- Genre: Black comedy; Romantic comedy; Psychological drama
- Written by: Jo Yong
- Directed by: Park Shin-woo
- Starring: Kim Soo-hyun; Seo Yea-ji; Oh Jung-se
- Music by: Nam Hye-seung
- Opening theme: "Sketch Book" by Janet Suhh
- Country of origin: South Korea
- Original language: Korean
- No. of episodes: 16

Production
- Running time: 70–85 minutes
- Production companies: Story TV; Gold Medalist

Original release
- Network: tvN
- Release: June 20 – August 9, 2020

Related
- It's Okay to Not Be Okay (Philippines)

It's Okay to Not Be Okay (Korean: 사이코지만 괜찮아) is a 2020 South Korean romantic comedy drama television series written by Jo Yong, directed by Park Shin-woo, and starring Kim Soo-hyun, Seo Yea-ji, and Oh Jung-se. The series follows Ko Moon-young, an antisocial children's book writer who moves to her hometown to pursue her love interest Moon Gang-tae, a psych ward caretaker, who has dedicated his life to taking care of his autistic older brother Moon Sang-tae. It aired on tvN from June 20 to August 9, 2020, every Saturday and Sunday at 21:00 (KST). It is also available for streaming on Netflix in selected regions.

According to Nielsen Korea, the series recorded an average nationwide TV viewership rating of 5.4%. It was the most popular show of 2020 in the romance genre on Netflix in South Korea. Critical response were primarily positive; some commentators criticized the writing in the latter half of the series but praised the acting by the cast.

The New York Times named It's Okay to Not Be Okay one of "The Best International Shows of 2020". At the 57th Baeksang Arts Awards, it received eight nominations with two wins (Best Supporting Actor – Television and Best Technical Achievement – Television for costume design). It received a nomination at the 49th International Emmy Awards in the Best TV Movie or Miniseries categories.

== Plot ==
Moon Gang-tae lives with his older brother Moon Sang-tae, who has autism. They frequently move from town to town ever since Sang-tae witnessed their mother's murder. Gang-Tae works as a caregiver in a psychiatric ward at every place they settle in. While working in a hospital, he meets a famous children's book writer, Ko Moon-young, who is rumored to have antisocial personality disorder.

Circumstances lead Gang-tae to work at the OK Psychiatric Hospital in the fictional Seongjin City, the same city where they all lived when they were young. Meanwhile, Moon-young forms a romantic obsession for Gang-tae after finding out that their pasts overlap. She follows him to Seongjin, where the trio (including Sang-tae) slowly begins to heal each other's emotional wounds. They discover many secrets, seek comfort from each other, and move forward with their lives.

== Cast and characters ==
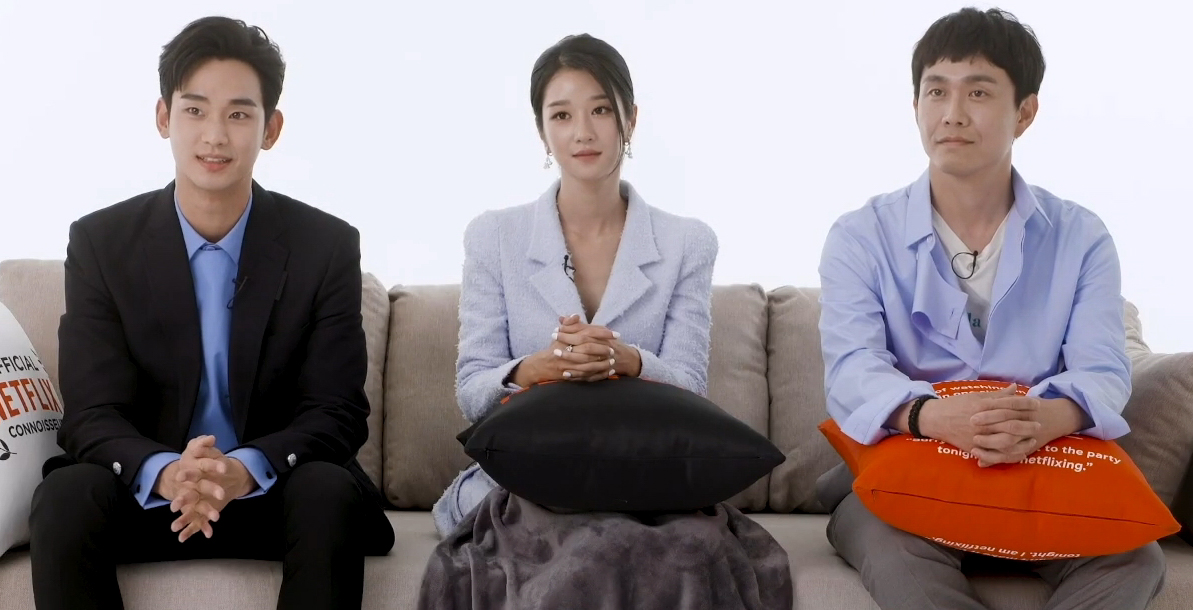
Kim Soo-hyun, Seo Yea-ji, and Oh Jung-se at a promotional interview.

=== Main ===
- Kim Soo-hyun as Moon Gang-tae
  - Moon Woo-jin as young Moon Gang-tae

An orphaned caregiver working at OK Psychiatric Hospital. While he is empathetic to everyone around him, he struggles with self-esteem as a result of his past experiences and avoids having close relationships with anyone other than his older brother.

- Seo Yea-ji as Ko Mun-yeoung
  - Kim Soo-in as young Ko Mun-yeoung

A popular children's book author with antisocial personality disorder. She had a troubled childhood and a turbulent relationship with her parents. She develops a romantic obsession over Gang-tae after a coincidental encounter, and often goes to extreme lengths to get his attention.

- Oh Jung-se as Moon Sang-tae
  - Lee Kyu-sung as young Moon Sang-tae

Moon Gang-tae's older brother that has autism, who is an aspiring illustrator and a fan of Mun-yeoung. He was the sole witness of his mother's murder, which resulted in his irrational fear of butterflies, as they remind him of his traumatic experience. His fear develops into nightmares every spring, and forces Gang-tae to move towns with him in order to "run away from the butterflies".

=== Supporting ===
SangsangESang Publishing Company

- Kim Joo-hun as Lee Sang-in

The CEO of SangsangESang Publishing Company, which publishes Moon-young's children's books.

- Park Jin-joo as Yoo Seung-jae

The art director at SangsangESang Publishing Company who assists Sang-in.

OK Psychiatric Hospital Officials

- Kim Chang-wan as Oh Ji-wang

The director of OK Psychiatric Hospital. Despite his use of unconventional methods, he genuinely cares for his patients and often succeeds at helping them get better.

- Park Gyu-young as Nam Ju-ri
  - Park Seo-kyung as young Nam Ju-ri

A nurse and Gang-tae's co-worker at OK Psychiatric Hospital. She has an unrequited crush on Gang-tae, and is shown to be shy and easily jealous of others who are close with her romantic interests. She dislikes Moon-young, with whom she had a brief friendship in elementary school.

- Kim Mi-kyung as Kang Soon-deok

A skilled chef at the hospital and Ju-ri's mother.

- Jang Young-nam as Park Haeng-ja

The head nurse of the hospital.

- Jang Gyu-ri as Sun Byul

A nurse with three years of experience who is Ju-ri's co-worker and friend.

- Seo Joon as Kwon Min-seok

A psychiatrist at the hospital.

- Choi Woo-sung as Oh Cha-yong

A young and careless caregiver who often sleeps at work. He is the son of hospital director Oh Ji-wang.

OK Psychiatric Hospital Patients

- Lee Eol as Ko Dae-hwan

Moon-young's father, who is a patient at the hospital. He suffers from dementia and is bedbound. He was an architect who designed the Ko's family house, which is nicknamed the "Cursed Castle" after his wife Do Hui-jae's disappearance.

- Kim Ki-cheon as Kan Pil-ong

A kind-hearted yet troubled Vietnam War veteran who suffers from post-traumatic stress disorder.

- Jung Jae-kwang as Joo Jeong-tae

A patient content with life who was originally admitted to the hospital for alcoholism. He is Lee Ah-reum's boyfriend.

- Ji Hye-won as Lee Ah-reum

A shy patient who was admitted for anxiety after escaping from her abusive ex-husband. She is Joo Jeong-tae's girlfriend.

- Kang Ji-eun as Park Ok-ran

A mysterious fan of Hui-jae who torments Dae-hwan.

- Joo In-young as Yoo Sun-hae
  - Ko Do-yeon as young Sun-hae (ep. 13)

A patient with dissociative identity disorder that she developed as a coping mechanism because of the troubled relationship with her father.

Others

- Kang Ki-doong as Jo Jae-soo

Moon Gang-tae's best friend, who follows him and Sang-tae whenever they move.

- Choi Hee-jin as Moon Sang-tae and Moon Gang-tae's mother

A single parent murdered over a decade ago under mysterious circumstances.

- Woo Jung-won / Jang Young-nam as Do Hui-jae

A best-selling novelist and Moon-young's mother. She was emotionally abusive to Moon-young and is a big part of the reason why she is the way she is. She disappeared under mysterious circumstances over a decade before Moon-young meets Gang-tae again.

=== Special appearances ===
- Kwak Dong-yeon as Kwon Ki-do

A patient at the hospital diagnosed with mania and the son of an assemblyman.

- Bae Hae-sun as Kang Eun-ja

A patient at the hospital diagnosed with psychotic depression after losing her daughter in a car accident.

- Jung Sang-hoon as a love motel owner
- Choi Daniel as CEO Choi Daniel

A fan of Ko Moon-young.

== Episodes ==
No.	Title	Original release date	South Korea viewers (millions)
1	"The Boy Who Fed On Nightmares"	June 20, 2020	N/A
2	"The Lady In Red Shoes"	June 21, 2020	N/A
3	"Sleeping Witch"	June 27, 2020	N/A
4	"Zombie Kid"	June 28, 2020	N/A
5	"Rapunzel and the Cursed Castle"	July 4, 2020	N/A
6	"Bluebeard's Secret"	July 5, 2020	N/A
7	"The Cheerful Dog"	July 11, 2020	N/A
8	"Beauty and the Beast"	July 12, 2020	N/A
9	"The King Has Donkey Ears"	July 18, 2020	N/A
10	"The Girl Who Cried Wolf"	July 19, 2020	N/A
11	"The Ugly Duckling"	July 25, 2020	N/A
12	"Romeo and Juliet"	July 26, 2020	N/A
13	"The Father of the Two Sisters"	August 1, 2020	N/A
14	"The Hand, The Monkfish"	August 2, 2020	N/A
15	"The Tale of Two Brothers"	August 8, 2020	N/A
16	"Finding The Real Face"	August 9, 2020	N/A

== Production ==
=== Development ===
It's Okay to Not Be Okay was planned by Studio Dragon, written by Jo Yong, directed by Park Shin-woo, and produced by Story TV and Gold Medalist. Jo Yong based the drama on her relationship with a man who had a personality disorder. She developed Moon Sang-tae's character by listening to the stories of people with autistic brothers and referred to the books recommended by the CEO of Bear Better, a social enterprise where people with developmental disabilities work. Fashion director Cho Sang-kyung managed costumes, while fashion designer Minju Kim designed some of Ko Moon-young's dresses.

=== Casting ===
In the second half of 2019, Kim Soo-hyun considered It's Okay to Not Be Okay to be his comeback drama following his obligatory military enlistment, and his casting was confirmed by his agency in February 2020. At the press conference for the drama, he said that he joined the project after being drawn to its title and Moon Gang-tae's character. In the same month, Seo Yea-ji was confirmed to be cast as Ko Moon-young. In March 2020, veteran actor Oh Jung-se accepted the role of Moon Sang-tae; when asked about his character at the press conference, he commented that "autism isn't an illness, but something you're born with".

=== Filming ===
The filming was completed on July 31, 2020, without a wrap party out of concerns for the COVID-19 pandemic. Filming locations for the drama included Cafe Sanida in Wonju, Gangwon, which provided the background for the "cursed castle", completed with CGI effects, and Secret Blue Cafe in Goseong County, Gangwon, which was transformed into OK Psychiatric Hospital for the shooting using props. Outside locations included streets and beaches in Goseong, as well as locations in Yangju (Gyeonggi Province) and Incheon. Some of the furniture used in the drama were antiques and 100 to 200 years old.

== Media ==
=== Tie-in literature ===
The five children's storybooks that appeared in the drama were written by Jo Yong and illustrated by concept artist Jamsan. They were published in Korean by Wisdom House in July and August 2020. According to the Kyobo Book Centre and YES 24, all five books were listed in the top 20 bestselling books of the month. Due to its popularity, Kyobo Book Centre recorded a ninefold increase in the number of drama and film-related books. In 2021, all five books were translated by Woo Jae-Hyung into Brazilian Portuguese and published by Intrínseca in March and May.

No.	Title (English translation)	Pages	Publication date	ISBN
1	The Boy Who Fed on Nightmares (악몽을 먹고 자란 소년) (Note: Though The Boy Who Fed on Nightmares was published after Zombie Kid, it is listed by the publisher as the first book of the series.)	16	July 18, 2020	979-1-1909-0815-3
2	Zombie Kid (좀비아이)	24	July 13, 2020	979-1-1909-0816-0
3	The Dog of Spring Day (봄날의 개)	16	July 30, 2020	979-1-1909-0817-7
4	The Hand, the Monkfish (손, 아귀)	20	August 15, 2020	979-1-1909-0868-9
5	Finding the Real Faces (진짜 진짜 얼굴을 찾아서)	24	August 31, 2020	979-1-1909-0874-0

The series' script, also illustrated by Jamsan, was published in two books; each covering eight episodes.

No.	Title (English translation)	Pages	Publication date	ISBN
1	It's Okay to Not Be Okay 1 (사이코지만 괜찮아)	504	July 30, 2020	978-8-9315-8984-9
2	It's Okay to Not Be Okay 2 (사이코지만 괜찮아)	520	August 27, 2020	978-8-9315-8985-6

=== Soundtrack ===
It's Okay to Not Be Okay

Soundtrack album by Various Artists
- Released: August 9, 2020
- Length: 102:09
- Languages: Korean; English
- Labels: NHN Bugs; Most Contents

The It's Okay to Not Be Okay soundtrack album, executively written by music director Nam Hye-seung, was digitally released on August 9, 2021. It contains sixteen songs (including singles) and twenty score pieces from the series. It features vocal performances from Janet Suhh, Heize, Sam Kim, Park Won, Lee Su-hyun, Kim Feel, Cheeze, Yongzoo and Elaine. Pre-orders for the physical version began on August 5, and was officially released on August 13. The physical version debuted at number fourteen on the weekly Gaon Album Chart for the week ending August 15, and peaked at number ten the following week.

==== Tracklist ====
Disc 1
No.	Title	Artist(s)	Length
1.	"Sketch Book" (It's Okay to Not Be Okay Opening Title)	Janet Suhh	0:45
2.	"You're Cold" (더 많이 사랑한 쪽이 아프대; The One Who Loved You More Hurts)	Heize	3:54
3.	"Breath" (숨)	Sam Kim	4:13
4.	"My Tale"	Park Won	3:46
5.	"In Your Time" (아직 너의 시간에 살아; I'm Still Living in Your Time)	Lee Su-hyun	4:28
6.	"Hallelujah" (나도 모르는 노래; A Song I Don't Know)	Kim Feel	4:27
7.	"Little by Little" (너라서 고마워; Thank You For Being You)	Cheeze	4:26
8.	"Puzzle" (퍼즐)	Yongzoo	3:55
9.	"Wake Up"	Elaine	4:14
10.	"Got You"	GA EUN	3:13
11.	"Your Day" (feat. Kim Bom)	Kim Ki-won	1:51
12.	"In Silence"	Janet Suhh	3:29
13.	"I'm Your Psycho"	Janet Suhh	3:09
14.	"Lighting Up Your World"	Janet Suhh	3:38
15.	"Quelemente" (괜찮은 병원 체조송; OK Hospital Gymnastics Song)	Lee Jong-soo, Na Byung-soo	1:57
16.	"Song for Election" (선거송 [기호1번 권만수]; Election [Symbol No. 1 Kwon Man-soo])	Funny J	2:50
Total length:			54:02

Disc 2
No.	Title	Artist(s)	Length
1.	"Sew Your Heart"	Kim Kyung-hee	3:24
2.	"Brother (Gang-tae, Sang-tae's Theme)"	Nam Hye-seung; Park Sang-hee	3:35
3.	"Her World (Moon-young's Theme)" (그녀의 세계)	Nam Hye-seung; Park Sang-hee	3:23
4.	"Destiny is Nothing" (운명이 별거)	Nam Hye-seung; Park Sang-hee	1:32
5.	"Gang-tae & Jae-soo's Speed Instinct" (강태와 재수의 질주본능)	Kim Kyung-hee	1:19
6.	"Facing the Fate" (운명을 맞잡고)	Nam Hye-seung; Park Sang-hee	1:46
7.	"River of Loneliness (Gang-tae's Theme)" (외로움의 강)	Nam Hye-seung; Park Sang-hee	3:08
8.	"On The Road, Left Alone" (혼자 남겨진 그 길 위에서)	Nam Hye-seung; Park Sang-hee	4:22
9.	"Through The Dark Tunnel of Time" (어두운 시간의 터널을 지나다)	Nam Hye-seung; Park Sang-hee	3:16
10.	"Their Own World" (그들만의 세계)	Lee So-young	2:12
11.	"It's Okay" (괜찮아)	Nam Hye-seung; Go Eun-jung	1:18
12.	"Woorunggakshi" (우렁각시)	Nam Hye-seung; Go Eun-jung	1:15
13.	"Rooftop March" (옥탑방 행진곡)	Nam Hye-seung; Park Sang-hee	0:53
14.	"Butterfly (Do Hui-jae's Theme)" (나비)	Nam Hye-seung; Park Sang-hee	2:34
15.	"Jae-soo and Alberto" (재수와 알베르토)	Nam Hye-seung; Jeon Jung-hoon	0:48
16.	"A Hidden Heart" (감춰진 마음)	Lee So-young	3:03
17.	"Bluebeard" (푸른수염)	Nam Hye-seung; Jeon Jung-hoon	2:17
18.	"The Dusk of The City" (도시의 해질녘)	Lee So-young	3:52
19.	"For Ju-ri (For Elise Variation)" (주리를 위하여)	Nam Hye-seung; Park Sang-hee	1:26
20.	"Publishing Company SangsangESang" (상상이상 출판사)	Nam Hye-seung; Park Sang-hee	2:44
Total length:			48:07

==== Singles ====
Title	Artist(s)	Peak chart position	
Title	Artist(s)	KOR Gaon	KOR Hot
"You're Cold"	Heize	62	57
"Breath"	Sam Kim	59	61
"My Tale"	Park Won	92	62
"In Your Time"	Lee Su-hyun	31	32
"Hallelujah"	Kim Feel	80	67
"Little By Little"	Cheeze	107	86
"Puzzle"	Yongzoo	–	–

== Reception ==
=== Commercial performance ===
According to the big data analytics firm Good Data Corporation, It's Okay to Not Be Okay was the most talked about drama online in South Korea for eight consecutive weeks. It became a hot topic on social media when Oh spent a day with an autistic fan. It also topped CJ E&M and AGB Nielsen Media Research's Content Power Index (CPI) (Note: The CPI is a weekly-based measurement of every television program in South Korea developed by CJ E&M and research firm Nielsen Korea. Unlike existing viewers' ratings indexes that measure the number of television viewers using their home TV sets, the CPI monitors more detailed variables, including numbers of mobile and Internet streaming viewers and online "buzz" in social media.) report during its eight-week run with its highest CPI of 373.2 in the first week of August; it was the highest rated tvN drama of 2020 in CPI. Smart Media Rep (SMR), which distributes VoD (video on demand) clips of major broadcasters to online platforms like Naver and YouTube, reported the drama had over 110 million cumulative views as of December 10, 2020. An analysis performed by SMR found that the majority of viewers were in their 20s.

Studio Dragon recorded its highest quarterly performance in the second quarter of 2020 with sales of ₩141.4 billion, which was attributed to the growth of overseas sales of major dramas including It's Okay to Not Be Okay. CJ ENM, parent company of tvN, found that operating profits for the third quarter of 2020 increased by 17.9% when compared to the same period of 2019, due to an increase in digital-related sales as a response to the COVID-19 pandemic. Following the popularity of the drama, the outfits worn by Seo Yea-ji garnered attention and raised the profile of Korean fashion designers and brands of earrings, handbag and nightwear. When the soft toys, nightmare doll (Mang-tae) and dinosaur doll that were used in the drama were put on sale, the site quickly sold out.

=== Critical response ===
It's Okay to Not Be Okay largely received positive critical feedback, primarily for its unique premise, visual storytelling, acting by the cast, and importance given to mental health. Joan MacDonald of Forbes called it "the most visually appealing drama of 2020" and said, "Not only are the actors beautiful, but the drama's graphics, cinematography, and costumes are also gorgeous." Contributors to Manila Bulletin considered it "unafraid to introduce fresh elements" with necessary clichés in a romantic K-drama, and praised Moon-young as a "headstrong" and "independent woman". However, when the series debuted, culture critic Chung Deok-hyun was concerned that Moon-young's "exaggerated words and actions" could decrease viewers' immersion in the drama. In the Filipino version of Cosmopolitan, Jacinda A. Lopez found that the "messages the drama was relaying are where the beauty truly lies". Rumaiysa M Rahman of Prothom Alo praised writing that "this drama makes people realise, societies should stop looking at those who seem different."

John Lui and Jan Lee of The Straits Times gave the drama a rating of 3.5/5 stars and said that Kim "pull[ed] off a sensitive portrayal of a young man whose life has been derailed by tragedy". The New York Times' Mike Hale called Seo's performance "mesmerizing" and made the drama work. S. Poorvaja of The Hindu, praised Moon-Young as a character "excellently played by Seo Yea-ji", but criticized the writing, saying that "the show could have gone into more nuance – especially after the character was marketed as someone having Anti-Social Personality disorder". Poorvaja also said that the show's portrayal of a person with autism spectrum disorder was good, commenting that "Oh Jung-se's Moon Sang-tae is perhaps the show's biggest victory." Edmund Lee from South China Morning Post gave a rating of 3/5 stars, pointing out that the series would disappoint "detective fiction fans" because of the limited explanation of mystery surrounding the murder. Kim Jae-Ha of Teen Vogue described the storyline as "vigorous" and said, "The series finale offers hope and a sense of peace. But it will also make even the most stoic viewers tear up."

==== Sexually inappropriate scenes ====
The series was criticized on social media and the Korea Communications Standards Commission received over 50 formal complaints, largely for a scene in which Moon-young overtly stares and touches Gang-tae's body as he gets dressed. In another scene a male character, who suffers from bipolar disorder and exhibitionism, reveals parts of his body, with his genitals being covered by a drawing of an elephant. Some viewers defended these scenes as ways of expressing the characters' personalities.

On August 26, 2020, the broadcast censorship body issued a legal sanction to the television series for sexually inappropriate scenes in episode three, judging it to be against the broadcast deliberation regulations. It cited Article 27, on duties of integrity, and Article 30, on gender equality. The subcommission gave the reasoning: "Even considering the fact that they were meant to exaggeratedly express a character's personality, (the scenes in question) show how insensitive the drama's producers are to gender equality in broadcasting content that may belittle a certain gender and hold the possibility to justify sexual harassment and molestation."

=== Viewership ===
It's Okay to Not Be Okay was the most popular show of 2020 on Netflix in South Korea in its romance genre. It was the most popular Korean drama series on Netflix in Taiwan, and the "most enduring Korean drama" in Malaysia, Philippines, Singapore, and Thailand, being in Netflix's top 10 list for more than 100 days. The series was also one of the most popular Korean dramas of 2020 on Netflix in Australia, Hong Kong, India, Japan, and South Africa.

It's Okay to Not Be Okay aired on tvN, which normally has a relatively smaller audience compared to free-to-air TV/public broadcasters (KBS, SBS, MBC, and EBS). The series logged 6.1% in viewership for its first episode on Saturday but dropped to 4.7% for the next one. The series maintained its ratings in 4–6% range throughout its run and received audience acclaim, with its final episode recording 7.4% in nationwide ratings, becoming the "highest viewership rating among tvN dramas" at that point of time.

It's Okay to Not Be Okay : South Korea viewers per episode (millions)

Season	Episode number																Average
Season	1	2	3	4	5	6	7	8	9	10	11	12	13	14	15	16	Average
1	1.680	1.247	1.428	1.400	1.407	1.701	1.572	1.584	1.565	1.633	1.758	1.694	1.704	1.683	1.759	2.065	1.618

Source: Audience measurement performed nationwide by Nielsen Korea.

Average TV viewership ratings
Ep.	Part	Original broadcast date	Title (Note: Each of the episode titles is excerpted from well-known works of fiction, such as fairy tales, fables, novels, and plays, both real and fictitious (from the series).)	Average audience share (Nielsen Korea)	
Ep.	Part	Original broadcast date	Title	Nationwide	Seoul
1		June 20, 2020	"The Boy Who Fed On Nightmares" (Note: Excerpted from the fairy tale of the same title written by Ko Moon-young in the drama.)	6.093% (1st)	7.036% (1st)
2		June 21, 2020	"The Lady In Red Shoes" (Note: Excerpted from The Red Shoes by Hans Christian Andersen.)	4.722% (1st)	5.474% (1st)
3		June 27, 2020	"Sleeping Witch" (Note: Excerpted from Sleeping Beauty.)	5.940% (1st)	6.529% (1st)
4		June 28, 2020	"Zombie Kid" (Note: Excerpted from the fairy tale of the same title written by Ko Moon-young in the drama.)	4.942% (1st)	6.000% (1st)
5	1	July 4, 2020	"Rapunzel and the Cursed Castle" (Note: Excerpted from Rapunzel by the Brothers Grimm.)	4.661% (2nd)	5.285% (2nd)
5	2	July 4, 2020	"Rapunzel and the Cursed Castle"	5.248% (1st)	5.782% (1st)
6	1	July 5, 2020	"Bluebeard's Secret" (Note: Excerpted from Bluebeard by Charles Perrault.)	5.056% (2nd)	5.114% (2nd)
6	2	July 5, 2020	"Bluebeard's Secret"	5.647% (1st)	5.748% (1st)
7	1	July 11, 2020	"The Cheerful Dog" (Note: Excerpted from the fairy tale of the same title written by Ko Moon-young in the drama.)	5.054% (2nd)	5.434% (2nd)
7	2	July 11, 2020	"The Cheerful Dog"	5.555% (1st)	5.753% (1st)
8	1	July 12, 2020	"Beauty and the Beast" (Note: Excerpted from Beauty and the Beast by Gabrielle-Suzanne de Villeneuve.)	4.744% (2nd)	5.160% (2nd)
8	2	July 12, 2020	"Beauty and the Beast"	5.634% (1st)	6.407% (1st)
9	1	July 18, 2020	"The King Has Donkey Ears" (Note: Excerpted from The King with Donkey Ears.)	4.995% (2nd)	5.416% (2nd)
9	2	July 18, 2020	"The King Has Donkey Ears"	5.814% (1st)	6.501% (1st)
10	1	July 19, 2020	"The Girl Who Cried Wolf" (Note: Excerpted from The Boy Who Cried Wolf in Aesop's Fables.)	4.212% (2nd)	4.669% (2nd)
10	2	July 19, 2020	"The Girl Who Cried Wolf"	5.481% (1st)	5.995% (1st)
11	1	July 25, 2020	"The Ugly Duckling" (Note: Excerpted from The Ugly Duckling by Hans Christian Andersen.)	4.552% (2nd)	4.681% (2nd)
11	2	July 25, 2020	"The Ugly Duckling"	5.681% (1st)	5.661% (1st)
12	1	July 26, 2020	"Romeo and Juliet" (Note: Excerpted from Romeo and Juliet by William Shakespeare.)	5.145% (2nd)	5.597% (2nd)
12	2	July 26, 2020	"Romeo and Juliet"	5.264% (1st)	6.108% (1st)
13	1	August 1, 2020	"The Father of the Two Sisters" (Note: Excerpted from The Story of Janghwa and Hongryeon, a Joseon-era Korean folktale.)	4.794% (2nd)	5.155% (2nd)
13	2	August 1, 2020	"The Father of the Two Sisters"	5.696% (1st)	6.151% (1st)
14	1	August 2, 2020	"The Hand, The Monkfish" (Note: Excerpted from the fairy tale of the same title written by Ko Moon-young in the drama.)	5.403% (2nd)	6.042% (2nd)
14	2	August 2, 2020	"The Hand, The Monkfish"	5.947% (1st)	6.654% (1st)
15	1	August 8, 2020	"The Tale of Two Brothers" (Note: Excerpted from Heungbu and Nolbu, a Joseon-era Korean story.)	5.567% (2nd)	6.198% (2nd)
15	2	August 8, 2020	"The Tale of Two Brothers"	6.492% (1st)	7.365% (1st)
16	1	August 9, 2020	"Finding The Real Face" (Note: Excerpted from the fairy tale of the same title written by Ko Moon-young in the drama.)	6.224% (2nd)	7.296% (2nd)
16	2	August 9, 2020	"Finding The Real Face"	7.348% (1st)	8.535% (1st)
Average				5.425%	6.025%
In the table above, the blue numbers represent the lowest ratings and the red numbers represent the highest ratings.; Starting from July 4, 2020, each episode was aired in two parts.; This drama airs on a cable channel/pay TV which normally has a relatively smaller audience compared to free-to-air TV/public broadcasters (KBS, SBS, MBC, and EBS).

== Accolades ==
=== Awards and nominations ===
Name of the award ceremony, year presented, category, work(s) nominated / nominee(s) of the award, and the result of the nomination
Award ceremony	Year	Category	Work(s) / Nominee(s)	Result	Ref.
APAN Star Awards	2021	Best Drama	It's Okay to Not Be Okay	Nominated	
APAN Star Awards	2021	Top Excellence Award, Actor in a Miniseries	Kim Soo-hyun	Nominated	
APAN Star Awards	2021	Excellence Award, Actress in a Miniseries	Seo Yea-ji	Won	
APAN Star Awards	2021	Best Supporting Actor	Oh Jung-se	Won	
APAN Star Awards	2021	Popular Star Award, Actor	Kim Soo-hyun	Won	
APAN Star Awards	2021	Popular Star Award, Actress	Seo Yea-ji	Won	
APAN Star Awards	2021	KT Seezn Star Award	Kim Soo-hyun	Nominated	
APAN Star Awards	2021	KT Seezn Star Award	Seo Yea-ji	Nominated	
APAN Star Awards	2021	Best OST	Lee Su-hyun – "In Your Time"	Nominated	
Asia Artist Awards	2020	Grand Prize (Daesang)	Kim Soo-hyun	Won	
Asia Artist Awards	2020	Best Artist Award	Seo Yea-ji	Won	
Asia Artist Awards	2020	AAA Hot Issue Award	Kim Soo-hyun	Won	
Asia Artist Awards	2020	AAA Hot Issue Award	Seo Yea-ji	Won	
Baeksang Arts Awards	2021	Best Drama	It's Okay to Not Be Okay	Nominated	
Baeksang Arts Awards	2021	Best Director – Television	Park Shin-woo	Nominated	
Baeksang Arts Awards	2021	Best Screenplay – Television	Jo Yong	Nominated	
Baeksang Arts Awards	2021	Best Actor – Television	Kim Soo-hyun	Nominated	
Baeksang Arts Awards	2021	Best Actress – Television	Seo Yea-ji	Nominated	
Baeksang Arts Awards	2021	Best Supporting Actress – Television	Jang Young-nam	Nominated	
Baeksang Arts Awards	2021	Best Supporting Actor – Television	Oh Jung-se	Won	
Baeksang Arts Awards	2021	Best Technical Achievement (costume design)	Jo Sang-gyeong	Won	
Baeksang Arts Awards	2021	Most Popular Actress – Television	Seo Yea-ji	Won	
Daejeon Visual Art Tech Awards	2020	Visual of the Year Award (Special Video)	It's Okay to Not Be Okay	Won	
Korean Academy of Theater Arts	2020	Art of the Year Award	It's Okay to Not Be Okay	Won	
Seoul Music Awards	2020	OST Award	Lee Su-hyun – "In Your Time"	Nominated	
International Emmy Awards	2021	Best TV Movie or Miniseries	It's Okay to Not Be Okay	Nominated	

=== Listicles ===
Name of publisher, year listed, name of listicle, and placement
Publisher	Year	Listicle	Placement	Ref.
Forbes	2020	The 13 Best Korean Dramas Of 2020	Top 13	
La Tercera	2020	The most applauded Netflix series of the past 2020	Included	
NME	2020	Korean dramas of 2020: the good	Included	
Teen Vogue	2020	11 Best K-Dramas of 2020	Top 11	
The New York Times	2020	The Best International Shows of 2020	Included	
Entertainment Weekly	2025	The 21 best Korean shows on Netflix to watch now	Top 21	

== Adaptation ==
A Philippine remake of the series was confirmed by ABS-CBN in May 2024. It premiered from July 21 to October 17, 2025 on Kapamilya Channel. The series is also available for streaming three days in advance on Netflix and two days in advance on iWant.
