= 49th International Emmy Awards =

2021 awards ceremony

- Promotional poster.
- Date: November 22, 2021
- Location: Great Hall of Casa Cipriani in New York, NY
- Hosted by: Yvonne Orji

Highlights
- Directorate Award: Thomas Bellut

Television/radio coverage
- Network: (Online); International Academy’s website

The 49th International Emmy Awards ceremony took place on November 22, 2021 at Casa Cipriani in New York City, recognizing excellence in television programs produced and aired originally outside the U.S., and non-English language US primetime program between January 1, 2020 and December 31, 2020.

The nominations were announced on September 23, 2021.

The ceremony was hosted by Yvonne Orji, with presenters Vanessa Williams, Method Man, Joshua Jackson, Brian Cox, Piper Perabo, Danielle Moné Truitt, Chiké Okonkwo, Aidan Quinn, Brian d'Arcy James, Emeraude Toubia, Luciano Huck, Felipe Santana, Henning Baum and Angélica. Former NBA star Dirk Nowitzki presented the Directorate Award to Thomas Bellut, managing director of German public broadcaster ZDF.

== Eligibility ==
The 49th International Emmy Awards Competition was opened for all categories December 9, 2020 and closed February 17, 2021.

== Ceremony ==
Nominations for the 49th International Emmy Awards were announced in September 23, 2021 by the International Academy of Television Arts & Sciences (IATAS). Nominees come from Argentina, Belgium, Brazil, Canada, Chile, China, Colombia, Egypt, France, India, Israel, Japan, Lebanon, Mexico, the Netherlands, New Zealand, Norway, Portugal, Singapore, South Korea, Spain, Thailand, the United Kingdom and the United States.

The International Academy also presented one special award. Thomas Bellut, director of the TV channel ZDF, received the Directorate Award.

== Broadcast ==
The 49th International Emmy Awards Gala was live-streamed on the International Academy’s website (iemmy.tv) from 7 pm Eastern Time.

== Winners and nominees ==
Best Actor	Best Actress
David Tennant as Dennis Nilsen in Des (United Kingdom) (New Pictures/ITV); Roy Nik as Noam Ashkenazi in Normali (Israel) (Dori Media/HOT); Nawazuddin Siddiqui as Ayyan Mani in Serious Men (India) (Bombay Fables/Cineraas Entertainment/Netflix); Christian Tappan as Jaime Molina "El Abogado" in The Great Heist (Colombia) (Dynamo Producciones/Netflix)	Hayley Squires as Jolene Dollar in Adult Material (United Kingdom) (Fifty Fathoms/Channel 4); Valeria Bertuccelli as María "Marie" Vázquez in El Cuaderno de Tomy (Argentina) (Pampa Films/Netflix); Ane Gabarain as Miren in Patria (Spain) (HBO Europe/Alea Media); Menna Shalabi as Nour in Every Week Has a Friday (Egypt) (Shahid/Meem/Film Factory)
Best Drama Series	Best Comedy Series
Tehran (Israel) (Donna and Shula Productions/Paper Plane Productions); Aarya (India) (Ram Madhvani Films/Endemol Shine Group); El Presidente (Chile) (Gaumont/Amazon Studios); There She Goes – Season 2 (United Kingdom) (Merman Television)	Call My Agent! – Season 4 (France) (France Télévisions/Netflix); Motherland: Christmas Special (United Kingdom) (Merman Television/Twofour/Lionsgate); Promesas de Campaña (Colombia) (Foxtelecolombia/Claro Video); Vir Das: For India (India) (Weirdass Comedy/Netflix)
Best TV Movie or Miniseries	Best Arts Programming
Atlantic Crossing (Norway) (Cinenord/Beta Film/NRK); Des (United Kingdom) (New Pictures/ITV); It's Okay to Not Be Okay (South Korea) (Studio Dragon/Story TV/Goldmedalist); Todas As Mulheres do Mundo (Brazil) (Globoplay)	Kubrick by Kubrick (France) (Temps Noir/Telemark/ARTE); Romeo and Juliet: Beyond Word (United Kingdom) (Footwork Films); Kabuki Actors’ Anguish – Is Entertainment Nonessential? (Japan) (Fuji TV/Kyodo Television); Emicida – Amarelo: E Tudo Para Ontem (Brazil) (Netflix)
Best Documentary	Best Telenovela
Hope Frozen: A Quest to Live Twice (Thailand) (2050 Productions/Netflix); Cercados (Brazil) (Globoplay); They Call Me Babu (Netherlands) (Pieter van Huystee Film); Toxic Beauty (Canada) (White Pine Pictures)	The Song of Glory (China) (Tencent Video/Oasis Studio); Amor de Mãe (Brazil) (TV Globo); Quer o Destino (Portugal) (Plural Entertainment); Wo De Nv Xia Luo Ming Yi (A Quest To Heal) (Singapore) (MediaCorp)
Best Short-Form Series	Best Non-Scripted Entertainment
INSiDE (New Zealand) (Luminous Beast); Beirut 6:07 (Lebanon) (Shahid/Imagic); Diário de Um Confinado (Brazil) (Globoplay); Gente Hablando – Season 2 (Spain) (Set Màgic Audiovisual/Atresmedia)	The Masked Singer (United Kingdom) (Bandicoot Scotland/ITV); Da’s Liefde! (Belgium) (Shelter); I-Land (South Korea) (CJ ENM/Studio Take One/Hybe Corporation); ¿Quién es la Máscara? – Season 2 (Mexico) (Televisa/Endemol Shine Group)
Best Non-English Language U.S. Primetime Program
21st Annual Latin Grammy Awards (United States) (The Latin Recording Academy/Univision); A Tiny Audience (United States) (A Tiny Audience, LLC); Covid 19 Adaptarnos O Morir (United States) (WAPA-TV); Premio Lo Nuestro 2020 (United States) (Univision Network)

== Multiple wins ==
Multiple wins by country
Wins	Country
3	United Kingdom
2	France

Multiple wins by network
Wins	network/platform
2	Netflix
2	ITV

== Multiple nominations ==
Multiple nominations by country
Nominations	Country
7	United Kingdom
5	Brazil
4	United States
3	India
2
2	Colombia
2	South Korea
2	Spain
2	France
2	Israel

Multiple nominations by program
Nominations	Program
2	Des

Multiple nominations by network
Nominations	network/platform
5	Netflix
3	Globoplay
2	Endemol
2	HBO
2	ITV
2	Univision
