= Grégory Monro =

French filmmaker, writer and actor (born 1975)

Grégory Monro (born September 10, 1975) is a French filmmaker, writer and actor.

== History ==
Born in Paris, he grew up with American culture, watching films by his favorite directors, Steven Spielberg, Alfred Hitchcock, Stanley Kubrick, Frank Capra, Sergio Leone. The films of French comedian Louis de Funès led to Monro starting acting at age 9 before making his first films at 13. After graduating from French Film School ESRA, in 1997, he attended Jack Waltzer's masterclass for a few years in Paris and New York.

From 1999, Monro has written, produced, performed and directed several professional short films, most of which toured international film festivals such as Toronto, Palm Beach, Bolzano and South Korea. Monro has worked as a production manager for numerous commercials and music videos, including Ayọ and Sepultura.

Monro has written about Calamity Jane: he created an exhibit about her in Paris in 2010, and directed a docudrama for European broadcaster Arte. He purchased Calamity Jane's diary and letters in 2004, which led to his projects.

Monro has directed several biographical documentaries, amongst them "Louis de Funès Forever", Calamity Jane: Wild West Legend" and "Jerry Lewis: The man behind the clown ", selected at the Telluride Film Festival, the Lumière Film Festival, and the Haifa International Film Festival. In 2019, his documentary Michel Legrand: Let the music play] was nominated for an International Emmy Award.

His film Kubrick by Kubrick premiered in 2020 at the Tribeca Film Festival, and won several awards in 2021: the Best Arts Programming category at the 49th International Emmy Awards; a Rockie Award at the Banff World Media Festival; and the prize for Best Use of Footage in an Arts & Entertainment Production category in the FOCAL International awards.

== Filmography ==
- 2000 : Choose or lose (short)
- 2001 : Destinées (short)
- 2005 : Adagio (short)
- 2005 : Behind (short)
- 2013 : Rose or the mute liars (short)
- 2013 : Louis de Funès forever (documentary)
- 2014 : Calamity Jane : Wild West Legend (docudrama)
- 2016 : Jerry Lewis : The man behind the clown (documentary)
- 2017 : James Stewart, Robert Mitchum: The Two Faces Of America (documentary)
- 2018 : Pierre Richard: The quiet one (documentary)
- 2018 : Michel Legrand: Let the music play (documentary)
- 2019 : Toulouse-Lautrec: Racing through life (documentary)
- 2020 : Kubrick by Kubrick (documentary)
- 2021 : Buffalo Bill: Showtime ! (documentary)
- 2022 : Rosa Bonheur, mother nature (documentary)
- 2022 : In the eyes of Elsa Triolet (documentary)
- 2022 : Sean Connery vs James Bond (documentary)
- 2025 : Chaplin's Modern Times, the path of silence (documentary)
- 2025 : Erik Satie : Reloaded (documentary)

== Awards ==
=== Rose or the mute liars ===
- Molins Horror Film Festival: Jury's prize

=== Kubrick by Kubrick ===
- International Emmy Awards 2021: Best Arts Programming
- BANFF World Media Festival 2021: Rockie Award
- FOCAL International awards 2021: Winner, Best Use of Footage in an Arts & Entertainment Production category

== Bibliography ==
- Calamity Jane : Letters to her daughter (2007), Payot & Rivages
- Calamity Jane – Mémoires de l'ouest (2010), Hoëbeke ISBN 9782842303891
- Les personnages dans Lucky Luke (2013), Historia, Le Point
- Calamity Jane, aventurière (2017), Amaterra
