= Yang Kyung-won =

South Korean actor (born 1981)

- 양경원
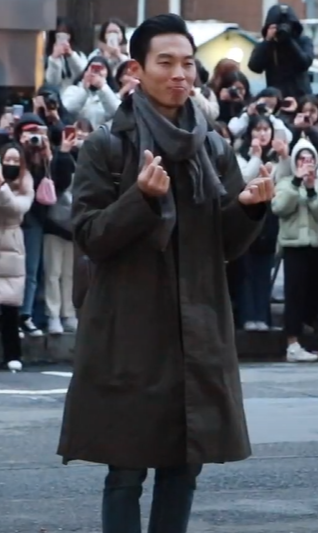
- Yang in 2020
- Born: Yang Kyung-won; 1 April 1981 (age 45); Seongbuk-dong, Seongbuk-gu, Seoul, South Korea
- Other name: Yang Gyeong-won
- Education: Kookmin University (Bachelor of Architecture)
- Occupations: Actor; model
- Years active: 2015–present
- Agent: HighZium Studio (Note: formerly History D&C)
- Known for: Crash Landing on You; Hi Bye, Mama! Arthdal Chronicles Part 1: The Children of Prophecy; Vincenzo
- Spouse: Cheon Eun-seong (m. 2018)

Korean name
- Hangul: 양경원
- RR: Yang Gyeongwon
- MR: Yang Kyŏngwŏn

Yang Kyung-won (Korean: 양경원; born 1981) is a South Korean actor and model. He is best known for his roles in Vincenzo, Crash Landing on You, Arthdal Chronicles Part 1: The Children of Prophecy and Hi Bye, Mama!.

== Early life ==
Yang Kyung-won was born on April 1, 1981, in Seongbuk-dong, Seongbuk-gu, Seoul. From a young age, he had a passion for interior design, architecture, dancing, and singing. When the time came to choose a college major at 19, he prioritized stability and opted for a field that offered more security. He enrolled to Kookmin University's Department of Architecture.

After completing his studies, he entered the workforce as an office worker in an architecture company. However, he soon realized that the job should be carried out by someone who could do it better and with more joy.

== Career ==
This realization led him to join a theater company, where he received training in dancing and singing, eventually making his debut in a musical. He debuted in the entertainment industry with the musical 42nd Street in 2010.

Although he initially lacked a strong passion for acting, everything changed when he encountered his current theater company, Theater Ganda, (Note: Performance Delivery Service - Ganda (Korean: 공연 배달 서비스-간다) or "Gongyeon Baedal Service-Ganda) was established as Study Group by nine fellow students from Korea National University of Arts, often referred to as "Theater Ganda" (극단 간다). In September 2004, they officially registered "Theater Ganda" (극단 간다) as a theater group called "Pitdeongi" (핏덩이), with the average age of the members being 25 years old. Current members include Kim Ji-hyun, Lee Hee-joon, Jin Seon-kyu, Kim Min-jae, Yang Kyung-won and Oh Eui-shik.) a performance delivery service, two years after his debut. From that point on, he began to truly enjoy the idea of acting and found satisfaction in being surrounded by people who shared his enthusiasm for the craft.

In 2019, a casting director who admired his current theater company, Theater Ganda, invited Yang to audition. During the second meeting with director Lee Jeong-hyo, Yang read a section of the Pyo Chi-soo role. However, when he received the script, the role wasn't as significant as he had expected. Nevertheless, he found it more appealing and felt thankful for the opportunity. Despite feeling pressure, he embraced the character's comedic aspects, even though he didn't consider himself naturally funny.

The role of North Korean soldier Pyo Chi-su in the drama Crash Landing on You became Yang's breakthrough role. He mentioned, "But the method was all in the script. The lines were written so attractively, and the situations themselves were written in an interesting way, so I thought I could execute it well without adding or subtracting. However, the atmosphere on set was so good, and everyone was working hard to film, support, and push me, so I forgot about it. That's it." Yang's wife also practiced the script with him and remarked, "Oppa, this character will be really attractive as long as you make the right choices." This made him nervous again. Everyone could feel it after reading the script. That's why, even if someone else played Pyo Chi-su, they would still have great material. "I guess they were loved because they were fresh and high-quality organic products. I was very lucky and took charge of them."

== Personal life ==
Yang Kyung-won married Cheon Eun-seong in 2018. Cheon Eun-seong is a musical actress who also holds multiple certifications in Pilates and works as an instructor. During her involvement in a musical production, she took a temporary break from her role as a Pilates instructor.

Social design brand INIF is working with Yang and his wife Cheon to help children and families in need through the "Family Photo" campaign. INIF is a campaign brand that addresses social issues. In 2020, INIF is launching a "Family Photo" campaign to help vulnerable children and families. To express the slogan of this campaign, "We were all children", the two actors' childhood photos and their current appearances were captured at one angle.

== Filmography ==
=== Film ===
Year	Title	Role	Language	Ref.
2016	SORI: Voice from the Heart	NIS agent	Korean	

=== Television series ===
Year	Title	Role	Ref.
2015-2016	Six Flying Dragons	Ahn-won	
2017	Fight for My Way	Cho-yun	
2017	The Liar and His Lover	Kim-eun	
2018	Let's Eat 3	Jang	
2019	Arthdal Chronicles	Teo-dae	
2019-2020	Crash Landing on You	Pyo Chi-su	
2020	Hi Bye, Mama!	Guk-bong	
2021	Vincenzo	Lee Cheol-woo	
2021	Drama Stage: "Deok Gu is Back"	Cheon Deok-gu	
2022	Big Mouth	Gong Ji-hoon	
2023	Welcome to Samdal-ri	Jeon Dae-young	
2024	Captivating the King	Yoo Hyun-bo	
2024	The Judge from Hell	Yang Seung-bin	

=== Web series ===
Year	Title	Role	Ref.
2021	One Ordinary Day	Park Doo-shik	
2022	Recipe for Farewell	Yang Soo-won	

=== Television show ===
Year	Title	Role	Ref.
2020	King of Mask Singer	Mistery singer (Don Quixote)	
2020	It's an Order	Cast member	

== Stage ==
=== Musical ===
List of Musical Play(s)
Year	Title		Role	Theater	Date	Ref.
Year	English	Korean	Role	Theater	Date	Ref.
2010	42nd Street	브로드웨이 42번가	Ensemble cast			
2011–2012	Zorro	조로	Ensemble cast	Blue Square Shinhan Card Hall	November 4 to January 15	
2012–2013	The Mirror Princess Pyeonggang Story	거울공주 평강이야기	Soldier two	Daehak-ro SH Art Hall	December 11 to March 31	
2012–2013	The Mirror Princess Pyeonggang Story	거울공주 평강이야기	Soldier two	JTN Art Hall 4	June 6 to September 1	
2014–2015	Oh While You're Sleeping	오 당신이 잠든 사이	Choi Byung-ho	Yegreen Theatre	August 29 to January 4	
2015	Logis	로기수	Lee Hwa-ryong	Yes 24 Stage 1	March 12 to May 31	
2015	The Mirror Princess Pyeonggang Story	거울공주 평강이야기	Soldier two	Gimpo Art Hall	March 28 to 29	
2015	Desirable Youth	바람직한 청소년	Physical education teacher Jong-cheol	Daehak-ro Arts Theatre Grand Theatre	December 4 to 20	
2016	The Mirror Princess Pyeonggang Story	거울공주 평강이야기	Soldier two	Gimpo Art Hall	September 23 to October 9	
2017	The Mirror Princess Pyeonggang Story	거울공주 평강이야기	Soldier two	Daehak-ro Arts Theatre Small Theatre	November 3 to 19	
2018	The Mirror Princess Pyeonggang Story	거울공주 평강이야기	Soldier two	Dongsung Art Centre Small Theatre	February 10 to 25	
2018	The Mirror Princess Pyeonggang Story	거울공주 평강이야기	Soldier two	Goyang Aram Nuri Sarasae Theatre	December 15 to 22	

=== Theater ===
List of Stage Play(s)
Year	Title		Role	Theater	Date	Ref.
Year	English	Korean	Role	Theater	Date	Ref.
2013	Me and Grandpa	나와 할아버지	Jun-hee	Daehangno Information Theater	Jul 11 – Aug 04	
2013–2014	Me and Grandpa	나와 할아버지	Jun-hee	Art One Theater Hall 3	Oct 11 – Jan 12	
2013–2014	Almost, Maine	올모스트 메인	East, Lendall, Chad, Dave	Sangmyung Art Hall 1	11.11–01.19	
2014	Me and Grandpa	나와 할아버지	Jun-hee	Art One Theater Hall 3	Feb 2 – April 20	
2014	Judo Boy	유도소년	Joseph	Art One Theater Hall 3	Apr 26–Jul 13	
2015	Judo Boy	유도소년	Joseph	Art One Theater Hall 3	February 7 – May 3	
2015	Me and Grandpa	나와 할아버지	Jun-hee	Yegreen Theater	May 5 — Aug 02	
2015	Judo Boy	유도소년	Joseph	Ansan Arts Center Dalmaji Theater	May 21–24	
2015	Judo Boy	유도소년	Joseph	Osan Culture and Arts Center Grand Theater	October 2–3	
2015	Judo Boy	유도소년	Joseph	Daegu Bongsan Cultural Center Grand Performance Hall (Gaon Hall)	October 9–10	
2015	Judo Boy	유도소년	Joseph	Uijeongbu Arts Center Small Theater	October 23–24	
2016	Almost, Maine	올모스트 메인	East, Lendall, Chad, Dave	Sangmyung Art Hall 1	Jan 08 – Jul 3	
2016	Almost, Maine	올모스트 메인	East, Lendall, Chad, Dave	Goyang Aram Nuri Sara Sae Theater	December 16–25	
2017	New Humanity's 100% Debate	신인류의 백분토론	Na Dae-soo	Arko Arts Theater Small Theater	February 10–26	
2017	New Humanity's 100% Debate	신인류의 백분토론	Na Dae-soo	Art One Theater 3	May 19 – July 9	
2017	New Humanity's 100% Debate	신인류의 백분토론	Na Dae-soo	Goyang Aram Nuri Sara Sae Theater	July 15–22	
2017	Tike	티케	Brother Lee Heon	Goyang Aram Nuri Sarasae Theatre, Goyang	December 21–23	
2018	New Humanity's 100% Debate	신인류의 백분토론	Na Dae-soo	Hongik University Daehangno Art Center Small Theater	July 20 – August 19	
2018	Shall We Go to Karaoke and Talk?	우리 노래방가서 얘기 좀 할까	Hee-jun	Goyang Aram Nuri Sarasae Theatre	August 25 to September 1	
2018	New Humanity's 100% Debate	신인류의 백분토론 - 성남	전진기	Seongnam Art Centre Ensemble Theatre	December 7–9	
2019	Hot Summer	뜨거운 여름	Adult Jae-hee and other roles	Goyang Aram Nuri Sara Sae Theater	April 6–14	
2019	Hot Summer	뜨거운 여름	Adult Jae-hee and other roles	Yes24 Stage 3	May 17 – June 30	
2019	Shall We Go to Karaoke and Talk?	우리 노래방가서 얘기 좀 할까	Father	Seongnam Art Centre Ensemble Theatre	June 14–16	
2021	Me and Grandpa	나와 할아버지	Grandfather	Art One Theater Hall 3	March 5	
2021	Perfetti Sconosciuti	완벽한 타인	Pepe	Sejong Centre for the Performing Arts M Theatre	May 18 – Aug 1	
2021	Me and Grandpa	나와 할아버지	Grandfather	Goyang Aram Nuri’s Sarasae Theater, Goyang	July 16–18	
2021	Perfetti Sconosciuti	완벽한 타인	Pepe	GS Caltex Yeulmaru Grand Theatre, Yeosu	August 13–14	
2022	Even Then Today	그때도 오늘	man 1	Seokyeong University Performing Art	Jan 08–Feb 20	
2022	Even Then Today	그때도 오늘	man 1	Sejong Arts Center	Jun 11–12	
2022	Even Then Today	그때도 오늘	man 1	Bupyeong Art Center Dalnuri Theater	Jul 08–09	
2022	Even Then Today	그때도 오늘	man 1	Busan Cultural Center Middle Theater	Sep 23–24	
2023	Even Then Today	그때도 오늘	man 1	Osan Culture and Arts Centre	June 2–3rd	
2023	Even Then Today	그때도 오늘	man 1	Cheongyang Culture and Arts Centre	June 22	
2023	Even Then Today	그때도 오늘	man 1	Incheon Namdong Sorae Art Hall	July 15	
2023	Even Then Today	그때도 오늘	man 1	Wonju Chiak Art Centre	August 27	
2023	Even Then Today	그때도 오늘	man 1	Changwon 3·15 Arts Center Small Theater	September 1–2	
2024	Even Then Today	그때도 오늘	man 1	Seokyeong University Performing Arts Center Scon Hall 2	March 15	
2026	Secret Passage	비밀통로	Dongjae	NOL Theater	Feb 13 – May 3	

== Awards and nominations ==
Award ceremony	Year	Category	Nominee / Work	Result	Ref.
Baeksang Arts Awards	2020	Best Supporting Actor	Crash Landing on You	Nominated	
Blue Dragon Series Awards	2022	Best Supporting Actor	One Ordinary Day	Nominated	
MBC Drama Awards	2022	Best Character Award	Big Mouth	Nominated	
