= One Ordinary Day =

2021 South Korea web series

- Promotional poster
- Also known as: That Night (former)
- Hangul: 어느 날
- Lit.: One Day
- RR: Eoneu nal
- MR: Ŏnŭ nal
- Genre: Crime; Thriller; Legal
- Created by: Chorokbaem Media
- Based on: Criminal Justice by Peter Moffat
- Developed by: Coupang Play
- Written by: Kwon Soon-kyu
- Directed by: Lee Myung-woo
- Starring: Kim Soo-hyun; Cha Seung-won; Kim Sung-kyu
- Music by: Gaemi (music manager)
- Country of origin: South Korea
- Original language: Korean
- No. of episodes: 8

Production
- Executive producers: Ahn Hye-yeon (Coupang Play); Kim Seong-han (Coupang Play); Yoo Ho-seong (Chorokbaem Media)
- Producers: Kim Sang-heon (Chorokbaem Media); Yu Jin-oh (Studio M); Kim Mi-hye (Gold Medalist); Lee Ro-be (Gold Medalist)
- Editors: Im Seon-kyung; Lee Ji-hye
- Running time: 55–79 minutes
- Production companies: Studio M; Chorokbaem Media; Gold Medalist
- Budget: ₩20 billion

Original release
- Network: Coupang Play
- Release: November 27 – December 19, 2021

One Ordinary Day (Korean: 어느 날; RR: Eoneu nal; lit. One Day) is a 2021 South Korean television series starring Kim Soo-hyun and Cha Seung-won. It is based on the British television series Criminal Justice written by Peter Moffat. It premiered on Coupang Play in South Korea on November 27, 2021, and aired a total of 8 episodes. It is streaming exclusively through Viu outside South Korea.

== Synopsis ==
On a day no different from any other, a straight-A university student Kim Hyun-soo (Kim Soo-hyun) makes the mistake of his life. Just as any other college kid would, Hyun-soo is on his way to hang out with his friends. Late at night, he takes his father's taxi to head over to where his friends are. Hong Gook-hwa (Hwang Se-on), a sad-looking mysterious girl mistakes Hyun-soo's taxi for an on-duty cab and hops in. That was the beginning of everything. All the choices Hyun-soo made that night leads the normal university student to becoming the prime suspect in a violent murder case. While Hyun-soo shivers from fear and the fact that he is falsely accused, everyone still points to him as the only possible murderer. In this hopeless situation, those who stretch out a helping hand are a low-life attorney, Shin Joong-han (Cha Seung-won), and a criminal kingpin who rules the prison food chain, Do Ji-tae (Kim Sung-kyu). To prove his innocence in any way possible, Hyun-soo gives everything he has to fight against the police and the Korean prosecution.

== Cast ==
=== Main ===
- Kim Soo-hyun as Kim Hyun-soo

A normal college student whose life turns upside down when he unexpectedly becomes the key suspect of the murder case.

- Cha Seung-won as Shin Joong-han

A lawyer who barely passed the bar exam and the only person who reaches out to help Kim Hyun-soo.

- Kim Sung-kyu as Do Ji-tae

A violent criminal who has been serving a prison sentence for 10 years and has control over the prison.

=== Supporting ===
- Kim Hong-pa as Park Sang-beom, the head of the detective department working on Hyun-soo's case
- Kim Shin-rok as Ahn Tae-hee, a prosecutor working on Hyun-soo's case
- Yang Kyung-won as Park Doo-sik
- Lee Seol as Seo Soo-jin, a rookie lawyer who follows Hyun-soo's case
- Jung Ji-ho, a National Forensic Service (NFS) staff
- Kim Young-ah as Hong Jeong-ah, a NFS staff
- Moon Ye-won as Kang Da-kyung, a journalist who investigates Hyun-soo's case to write exclusive articles

=== Others ===
- Hwang Se-on as Hong Gook-hwa
- Kim Yoo-jung as Joong-han's new client (cameo)

== Production ==
On January 5, 2021, it was announced that The Studio M, Chorokbaem Media and Gold Medalist would co-produce a television series based on the British Broadcasting Corporation (BBC) crime series Criminal Justice. BBC Studios confirmed the adaptation on January 13, through its media centre. Kim Soo-hyun and Cha Seung-won stars in leading roles, Kwon Soon-kyu wrote the screenplay, and Lee Myung-woo directed the series. Filming began in the first half of 2021. It is Coupang Play's first original series with exclusive broadcast rights in South Korea.

== International Broadcast ==
In the Philippines, the series was acquired and was bought by GMA Network. It is slated to air on 25 August 2025 in the country.

== Awards and nominations ==
Ceremony	Year	Award	Recipient	Result	Ref.
APAN Star Awards	2022	Top Excellence Award, Actor in an OTT Drama	Kim Soo-hyun	Nominated	
APAN Star Awards	2022	Popularity Star Award, Actor	Kim Soo-hyun	Nominated	
Asian Television Awards	2022	Best Original Digital Drama Series	One Ordinary Day	Nominated	
Asian Television Awards	2022	Best Leading Male Performance – Digital	Kim Soo-hyun	Nominated	
Asian Television Awards	2022	Best Direction (Fiction)	Lee Myung-woo	Won	
Blue Dragon Series Awards	2022	Best Supporting Actor	Yang Kyung-won	Nominated	
