= Kubrick by Kubrick =

2020 documentary film

- Poster
- Genre: Documentary
- Directed by: Gregory Monro
- Starring: Stanley Kubrick

Production
- Producers: Martin Laurent; Jeremy Zelnik
- Running time: 73 minutes

Original release
- Network: Arte
- Release: 12 May 2020

Kubrick by Kubrick is a 2020 documentary film directed by Gregory Monro about the film director Stanley Kubrick.

== Synopsis ==
Using archival footage (ranging from past interviews with people who worked with him to the director's own home movies) and rare audio interviews of the filmmaker explaining his own interpretations on his own works.

== Cast ==
- Stanley Kubrick
- Malcolm McDowell
- Jack Nicholson
- Shelley Duvall
- Sterling Hayden
- Arthur C. Clarke
- Vincent D'Onofrio
- Marisa Berenson
- Nicole Kidman
- Tom Cruise

== Production ==
The film is produced by Martin Laurent, and Jeremy Zelnik under the banners of Temps noir, Telemark, and Arte. The film premiered on Arte in France on 12 May 2020.

== Release ==
It was scheduled to premiere at the 2020 Tribeca Film Festival, but the festival was canceled due to COVID-19, but was once again selected for the 2021 edition. Kubrick by Kubrick has been selected in numerous festivals like Karlovy Vary International Film Festival and Deauville American Film Festival. Gregory Monro's film was also awarded at the Focus International Film Festival and with a Rockie Awards at the Banff World Media Festival.

== Reception ==
On the review aggregator website Rotten Tomatoes, 83% of 24 critics' reviews are positive, with an average rating of 6.8/10. The website's consensus reads: "It might be fairly standard in terms of format, but Kubrick by Kubrick still offers the rare treat of hearing the famously taciturn filmmaker address his own work."

Owen Gleiberman, writing for Variety, said, "Everything in a Kubrick movie is delivered to you; every aspect of it is visually, logically, spatially, metaphysically built. Yet in each case what that exquisite structure contains, in its very concreteness, is a mystery. Kubrick controlled every last dimension of his movies. Except what they meant". Sheri Linden of The Hollywood Reporter wrote, "As a look at Kubrick's methods, madness and burning intelligence, Kubrick by Kubrick is fluent and discerning". Eric Kohn of IndieWire said, "Kubrick by Kubrick lingers in the restless ingenuity at the heart of the filmmaker's work – a palpable desire to find new storytelling possibilities each time out".

The film won Best Arts Programming at the 49th International Emmy Awards in 2021.
