= Seongbuk-dong =

- Seongbuk-ro, Seongbuk-dong
- Interactive map of Seongbuk-dong
- Coordinates: 37°35′49″N 126°59′37″E
- Country: South Korea

Area
  - Total: 2.68 km^{2} (1.03 sq mi)

Population (2001)
  - Total: 16,444
  - Density: 6,140/km^{2} (15,900/sq mi)

Korean name
- Hangul: 성북동
- Hanja: 城北洞
- RR: Seongbuk-dong
- MR: Sŏngbuk-tong

Seongbuk-dong Community Service Center(Seongbuk-gu)

Seongbuk-dong (Korean: 성북동) is a dong (neighbourhood) of Seongbuk District, Seoul, South Korea.

Seongbuk-dong is a village located in the north of Seoul, nestled in the hills overlooking the city. A large proportion of the residences are owned by wealthy households. It is also where many ambassadorial residences are located (among them, the residences of the Chinese, Australian and Canadian ambassadors).

== Toponymy ==
Seongbuk-dong is a village located in the north of Seoul, nestled in the hills overlooking the city. When Yi Seong-gye (Taejo of Joseon) announced the capital of Joseon as Seoul, and naturally began to call the northern rampart connecting Sukjeongmun (a.k.a., Namdaemun) and Dongsomun (a.k.a., Hyehwamun), Seongbuk.

== History ==
=== Joseon dynasty ===
The town was originally called Nogumetgol. Nogume is a bowl of rice cooked in a brass or copper kettle prepared to offer the spirits of mountains and lakes during religious ceremonies. Ancient legends say that after a woman prayed every day with nogume, her husband came back after leaving the house. The village was also called Dodukgol, having steep mountains with many thieves. In mid-Joseon, Bukdun of Eoyeoungcheong was established to protect the city. The first settlers were sent then to farm the area, but because of the harsh environment, it was impossible to farm crops, and people began to leave the town. To solve the problem, King Yeongjo gave the citizens of Seongbuk-dong a privilege to whitewash clothes and ferment soybeans needed in the palace. These privileged jobs became the origin of the names of certain parts (e.g., Bballaegol, Bukjeokgol) of the city.

Although life in Seongbuk-dong was harsh for commoners, the noble class visited the village often because of its beautiful nature.

Also, Seongbuk-dong was the place where seongamrae was held. At 1400, Seongamdan was built at Seongbuk area and performed ancestral rites for Seoreung whom known as the first one to teach the method for breeding silkworms for the people. The unique point of this ceremony was the thing that women took the main role of management. Seongamrae was led by the queen of Joseon and managed by the women who worked at the palace. 1908, Shinwi had moved to Sagikdan and only the trace is left at the Seongbuk-dong, and seongamdan is the sageok 83th.

=== Japanese colonial era ===
In 1930–40, the town was such an underdeveloped rural area that pheasants and wolves were found in backyards. During the Japanese colonial period, the Japanese imperial family moved into the town to enjoy rural life in secluded mountains and brought in convenient facilities along with them. However, most of the original civilians were too poor that they have been unable to help themselves.

Also, the Japanese used the local administrative organization for the exploitation of the people. But the seongbukgeongheo (the local administrative organization at Seongbuk-dong) also had an identity of autonomy group of citizens. Seongbukgeongheo tried to solve problems of the region by the understanding of the citizens who belong to Seongbuk-dong.

=== Post-colonial era ===
==== Development of pondok villages ====
After the Korean War, as the economy got stabler, more people moved into the area. Especially refugees from Hamcheong of Hamgyeong-do moved in and developed a pondok village. Most of the pondoks then are now torn down for redevelopment.

==== Urbanization ====
Since 1968, the opening of Bukaksan Road and completion of Samcheong Tunnel have facilitated traffic after Samcheong-dong-gil and Seongbuk-dong-gil met. This development allowed many embassies to move into the city.

Seongbuk-dong has developed into a modern city, represented by the well-maintained Seongbukcheon, the remains of the castle, and highly raised apartments. The city is now a unique area where refugees and wealthy residents live together. There are large income gaps in this city. People who were wealthy in the 1960s have settled in this area. Multi-million dollar houses were built across the hill. However, Seongbuk-dong has a small area where low-income elders have also settled from 1960s.

== Administration ==
=== Geography ===
Seongbuk-dong totals 2.85 square kilometers in area. The city has Bukhan Mountain to the north and is surrounded by the old ramparts of Seoul in a fan shape.

=== Population ===
==== 2008 census ====
According to the 2008 census, Seoungbuk-dong's population was 19,308.

==== 2016 census ====
According to the 2016 census, Seongbuk-dong's population was 18,397.

==== 2017 census ====
According to the 2017 census, Seoungbuk-dong's population was 17,664.

=== Transportation ===
Seoul Subway Line 4 01,02,03 Seongbuk town bus

== Community residents ==
=== Artists-in-residence ===
During the Joseon period, many writers and painters set up their hometowns in Seongbuk-dong because the valley of the Seongbuk was the closest hunting grounds and shelter to the city.

Seongbuk-dong is the hometown of great literary talents such as Choi Sung-woo, Yeom Sang-seob, Lee Tae-jun, Han Yong-woon, Kim Kwang-seop.

=== Ambassador residence ===
Due to the good accessibility to the Blue House, Seongbuk-dong became home to many foreign embassies. Because of this, the city has many ambassador's residences, allowing the community to be rather diverse in race, nationality, and culture compared to other parts of Korea.

== Government and politics ==
=== Administration ===
Seongbuk-dong is located in the west of Seongbuk District. It has control over four dongs designated by customary law: Seongbuk-dong, Seongbuk-dong 1-ga, Dongso-mun 1-ga, and Dongso-mun-dong 4-ga.

== Income gap ==
After the war, the people of Hamgyeong Province started to evacuate and set up this valley as a slum. In the 1960s, when the economic development took place, the mountain villages were broken into one new residential area.

Then, since the late 1970s, Seongbuk-dong became popular for good prospects and environments, and luxury houses have begun to enter. In particular, this rumor has spread to the diplomatic community, so the embassy has begun to slowly enter the area, and now residences of 30 countries are established.

A large proportion of the residences are owned by wealthy households. It is also where many ambassadorial residences are located (among them, the residences of the Chinese, Australian and Canadian ambassadors). Seongbuk-dong is home to a lot of rich people, but also has the last slum of Seoul, Bukjeong town. Therefore, Seongbuk-dong is known for the large gap in economic power between the rich and the poor.

== Culture ==
=== Literature ===
==== Pigeons of Seongbuk-dong ====
성북동 산에 번지가 새로 생기면서
본래 살던 성북동 비둘기만이 번지가 없어졌다.

새벽부터 돌 깨는 산울림에 떨다가
가슴에 금이 갔다.
그래도 성북동 비둘기는
하느님의 광장 같은 새파란 아침 하늘에
성북동 주민에게 축복의 메시지나 전하듯
성북동 하늘을 한 바퀴 휘 돈다.

성북동 메마른 골짜기에는
조용히 앉아 콩알 하나 찍어 먹을
널찍한 마당은커녕 가는 데마다
채석장 포성이 메아리쳐서
피난하듯 지붕에 올라앉아
아침 구공탄 굴뚝 연기에서 향수를 느끼다가
산 1번지 채석장에 도로 가서
금방 따낸 돌 온기(溫氣)에 입을 닦는다.

예전에는 사람을 성자(聖者)처럼 보고
사람 가까이
사람과 같이 사랑하고
사람과 같이 평화를 즐기던
사랑과 평화의 새 비둘기는
이제 산도 잃고 사람도 잃고
사랑과 평화의 사상까지
낳지 못하고 쫓기는 새가 되었다.

— Kim Kwang-seop
Translation:

As Seongbuk-dong Mountain is newly developed
Only the Seongbuk-dong pigeon which originally lived lost their address

Trembling from the noise of breaking rocks since dawn,
their hearts cracked.
Still, the Seongbuk-dong pigeons,
in the morning sky, like the square of God,
seems to deliver a message of blessing to the people,
as they fly around the Seongbuk-dong sky.

In the barren valley of Seongbuk-dong,
there is even no yard
to sit down quietly to eat beans.
Everywhere they go the sound of firing from a quarry echoes
so they sit on a roof as if to evacuate,
feeling the homesickness in the smoke of the morning chimney stove
then goes back to the mountain quarry
wiping their mouth with the warmth of a stone

In the past, they looked at people as saints.
The bird pigeon of love and peace which
were close to people,
loved with people,
enjoyed peace with people,
now lost the mountains and the people
and became a chased bird that cannot even bear
the thought of love and peace.

The Pigeons of Seongbuk-dong poem was written by Kim Kwang-seop, who wrote ritual of loneliness and anxiety at his young ages, and in his old ages, he wrote a poem containing humanity with materials that could be found in daily life. The form of poetry is a three-verse modern lyrical poem, showing a satirical tendency. The theme of nostalgia destroys the nature of modern civilization. The internal rhythm is based on the external rhythm. It is a poem that depicts a soft, mellow description, such as "Trembling from the noise of breaking rocks since dawn, their hearts got cracked. ," or "the morning sky like the square of God," or "wiping their mouth with the warmth from a stone"

In the first verse, the mountain is being destroyed. The truth of nature destruction is revealed naked in a simple sentence of "the pigeon is cracked in the chest". There is nowhere to rest in the Seongbuk-dong valley as described in the second verse. In the third verse, the pigeons that was recognized as the symbol of peace were gone, and there was no place for love and peace that was full of human hearts. Humanity is destroyed. Now humans have become "a bird that is chased" by the civilization they have set up, "going to the heart" and "losing the mountains and losing people". It is the part where the theme is concentrated.

==== Moonlit night ====
The novel "Moonlit night" is a short novel based on Seongbuk-dong written by Lee tae-joon. In this work, though the compassion of first-person narrator perspective who views the main character forms the cast, the narrator reduces the information related to the misfortune of the main character "Hwang soo-gun" to a minimum and proceed to the narrative of other events and to prevent the reader from becoming immersed in the hero's misfortune. Because of this, the feelings of the reader who reads this work merely remain in the compassion that they see from afar.

In this novel, the writer shows the personality of the person named "Hwang soo-gun" and the perception of the world in which such a person can not live. In other words, since this world is a place where only the lucky ones who are fast and competitive can live, it is said that those who make only the newspaper delivery as the "Hwang soo-gun" are to be excluded from the urban competition. The artist shows through the main character that there is no way for these people to live even though they have the right to live as a person.

=== Cultural diversity ===
The embassies in Seoul often hold cultural exchange festivals for foreigners and local residents.

==== European Christmas market ====
The European Christmas market is held every winter to let people experience and celebrate Christmas. During the two-day festival, booths are held to offer dishes enjoyed during Christmas holidays from each country.

==== Seongbuk Global Village Center ====
The Seongbuk Global Village Center was established in 2009 for residents in the local area. The center is a place where Korean and foreign residents can share their cultures. This center is intended to help overcome cultural differences and be ready to a multicultural society.

== Parks and other attractions ==
=== Hanok village ===
==== Angdoo village ====
Angdoo Village is named after angdoo, a Korean fruit which is similar to cherry. The village was named after it for there are many angdoo trees. It is located at Seongbuk-dong 1-ga 105-11, right outside the Hyehwa-mun. The Angdoo Village is one of the first designated hanok areas outside of the Seoul's Sadaemun. The village totals 31,245 m^{2} in area and consists of 22.5% of hanok (38 dongs of hanok, 131 dongs of regular houses). Each hanok dong can be classified into 3 classes – Ga, Na, and Da, in order of quality. The village contains 10 of Ga class, 6 of Na class, 22 of Da class.

==== Seonjam Danji ====
Seonjam danji is an altar installed in the 1400s, where people prayed for the well of sericulture. It is located at Seongbuk-dong 62. Seonjam Danji totals 5,868 m^{2} in area, and consists of 45.4% of hanok(20 dongs of hanok, 24 dongs of regular houses). The hanoks can be classified to 2 of Ga class, 2 of Na class, and 16 of Da class.

=== Korea furniture museum ===
- Korea Furniture Museum

The Korea Furniture Museum houses more than 2,000 traditional furniture pieces, plus 10 hanoks (traditional Korean houses). The museum is a prominent architectural site in Seoul and a frequent destination for curators and designers visiting Seongbuk. Reservations are required to visit.

=== Gilsangsa Temple ===
Gilsangsa Temple is a temple located in the center of the city. It was priorly a restaurant owned by Kim Yeong-Han. Kim donated the area to Venerable Beopjeong, a Buddhist priest, who later changed the place to a temple. The temple includes the Hall of Paradise, Jijangjoeon Hall, and the Lecture Hall. The temple also features a library to read books about Buddhism.

=== Simwoojang ===
Simwoojang is a house built by Manhae Han Yong-un during the Japanese colonial era. Its name is derived from 'Simwoo', meaning 'to find a cow of its instinct'. The house is faced north to avoid seeing the Japanese Government-General of Korea but made the house dark and humid. There are many beautiful trees such as pine and juniper in the front yard. Han Yong-un died in the house while resisting against the Japanese Many writings, research papers, and records of trial prison are preserved in Han Yong-un's room.

=== Gansong Art and Culture Foundation ===
The Gansong Art and Culture Foundation is Korea's first private art museum, founded by Gansong Jeon Hyeong-Pil. Gansong's collection includes the Cheongja Sanggam Unhangmun Maebyeong and Hunminjeongeum. Despite the suppression of Japan towards Korea's cultural development, Gansong collected national cultural assets and established Bohwagak to protect and preserve the relics. The Bohwagak later became the Gansong Art and Culture Foundation. Gansong also put the effort in education and scholarship for Korean Culture and Arts, by taking over Bosung School to raise the younger generation in the area. The Gansong Art and Culture Foundation is not only an art museum pursuing beauty, but it is also a result of a pioneer's effort to protect the Koreans' spirit and soul.

=== Korean Stone Art Museum ===
The Korean Stone Art Museum is Korea's first museum for stone relics only, containing about 1,250 stone artifacts, 280 pieces of embroidery, and 100 pieces of modern and contemporary paintings. The museum has six exhibitions: Returned Artifacts Exhibition, Dongja Exhibition, Beoksu Exhibition, Embroidery Exhibition, Modern/Contemporary Exhibition, and the Outdoor Exhibition. It was established to pray for long life, happiness, and luck, allowing the visitors to feel the philosophy and the wisdom of ancestors.

== Notable people from Seongbuk-dong ==
- Kim Seon-ho, South Korean actor
- Um Ki-joon, South Korean actor
- Yang Kyung-won, South Korean actor
- Bumkey, South Korean R&B singer-songwriter
- Wendy, singer, dancer, model, MC and K-pop idol, member of K-pop girlgroup Red Velvet

== See also ==
- Administrative divisions of South Korea
