= Thomas Bellut =

German journalist

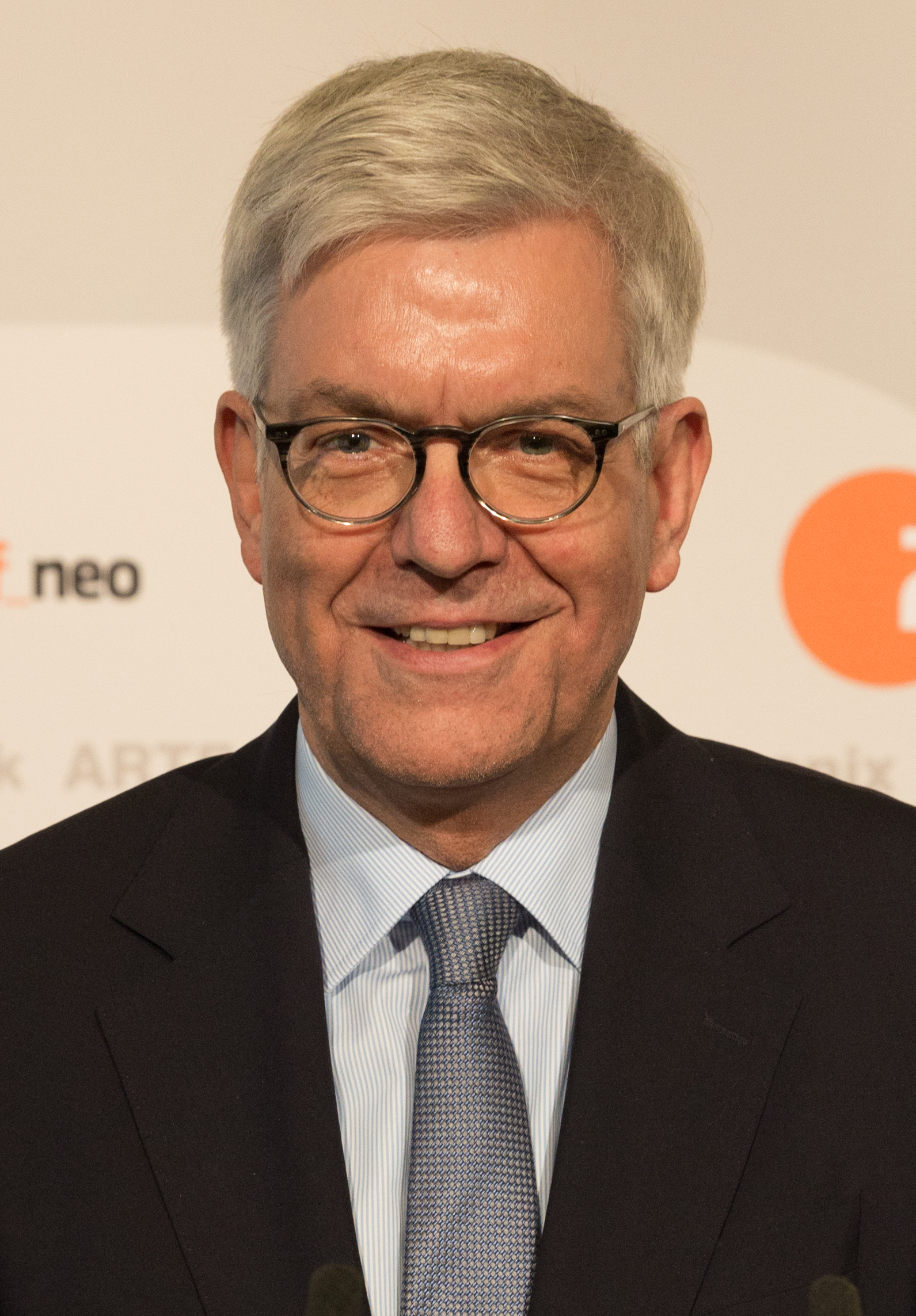
Bellut in 2016

Thomas Bellut (born 8 March 1955) is a German journalist. From 2012 to 2022, he was the director (German: Intendant) of the TV channel ZDF.

== Early life and education ==
Bellut was born in Osnabrück. After graduating from the school Antonianum in Vechta in 1974, he studied Political Science, History and Journalism at the Westphalian Wilhelms University in Münster from 1975 to 1982. During his studies he was a scholar of the Konrad Adenauer Foundation, finishing his studies with a PhD.

== Career ==
Before Bellut transferred to the TV channel ZDF in Mainz, he worked from 1983 to 1984 at the newspaper Westfälische Nachrichten in Münster.

At the ZDF channel Bellut was an editor of the Länderspiegel (lit. Federal State Mirror) TV magazine and ZDF correspondent in Berlin. He then became an assistant to the program director Oswald Ring responsible for shows like Familienmagazin (Family Magazine) and Reiselust (Wanderlust). After that, he was editorial director for special programs and the magazine blickpunkt (focal point). From 1997 he headed the main editorial department for domestic policy and presented specials and election broadcasts, like the Politbarometer, ZDF spezial, and the interview series Was nun, ..? (What now, ..?)

From 2002 to 2012 Bellut was Program Director of the ZDF channel. On 17 June 2011 he was elected as successor of Markus Schächter as ZDF Director. He is in office since 14/15 March 2012. As ZDF Director, Bellut has also been a member of the Global Task Force for Public Media, an initiative of the Public Media Alliance, since its founding in September 2019.

== Other activities ==
- Arte, Ex-Officio Vice President of the General Assembly
- Aktion Mensch, Ex-Officio Chairman of the Supervisory Board
- Deutsche Sporthilfe, Member of the Foundation's Council (since 2015)
- German Coordinating-Council for Christian-Jewish Cooperation Organizations, Member of the Board of Trustees
- German Foundation for Monument Protection, Member of the Board of Trustees
- International Journalists' Programmes (IJP), Member of the Board of Trustees
- Reporters Without Borders Germany, Member of the Board of Trustees
- Senckenberg Nature Research Society, Member of the Board of Trustees
- Stiftung Lesen, Chairman of the Board of Trustees
- Welthungerhilfe, Member of the Board of Trustees
