= Yongzoo =

South Korean singer (born 1994)

- Also known as: Jhomie
- Born: Park Yong-ju; 22 May 1994 (age 32); Masan, South Korea
- Genres: K-pop; R&B
- Occupations: Singer; songwriter
- Instrument: Vocals
- Years active: 2012–present
- Label: MostWorks Entertainment

Korean name
- Hangul: 박용주
- Hanja: 朴容主
- RR: Bak Yongju
- MR: Pak Yongju

Park Yong-ju (Korean: 박용주; born 22 May 1994), better known by his stage name Yongzoo, is a South Korean singer and songwriter signed to Mostworks Entertainment. He debuted with the song "In Your Eyes" in May 2018.

== Career ==
=== 2012–2016 ===
Park Yong-ju trained for three years at the entertainment agency SM Entertainment. He later became an associate member of the company's pre-debut training team SM Rookies, with the stage name "Yongju", (Note: Yongju isn't a publicly disclosed SM Rookies member. (2013 SM Rookies members non-official introduction (in Chinese)) although he did not get officially introduced. His only documented activity with the pre-debut team was a performance in "SM Town Week" in 2013 alongside the now-NCT members.

He participated as a contestant in a boy group survival reality show named Super Idol (season 1 and 2), which is co-hosted by China's Anhui Satellite TV and South Korea's MBC Music TV. In the final round of the first season, his team "B Swan" won. In the final round of the second season, he became the first winner of the show and also won a debut quota as a member of a new boy group.

=== 2017–present ===
In 2017, Park started to use the stage name Jhomie to launch songs. He collaborated with music composer Ferdy in "Ferdy's Project". They launched two songs in August 2017 and January 2018. The first single from "Ferdy's Project vol.1" was "See the Light", released in August 2017. In addition to participating the vocal part, Park also took part in the lyrical creation. In January 2018, they released "Ferdy's Project vol.2", with the single "At That Place", and Park again took part in singing and composing the track.

Park is signed to MostWorks Entertainment as a solo artist and debuted on 22 May 2018 under the stage name Yongzoo (용주). Since his debut, he has contributed to television soundtracks, including Are You Human? and The Third Charm.

In 2020, Park contributed the song "Sweet Home" to the soundtrack of the horror television series Sweet Home.

== Discography ==
=== EPs ===
Title	Album details	Peak chart positions	Sales
Title	Album details	KOR	Sales
This Time (이 시간)	Released: 10 April 2019; Label: MostWorks Entertainment; Formats: CD, digital download	69	—N/a

=== Singles ===
No.	Album	Title	Song Writers information
1st	《눈을 맞추면》（In Your Eyes）: Release Date：22 May 2018; Language：Korean; Remarks：용주（Yongzoo）feat. 예지(Yezi); Labels: OU, Nuplay	1. 눈을 맞추면; 2. 눈을 맞추면 (Inst.)	Composed by 허성진, 홍성준; Lyrics by 허성진, 이소원, 예지; Arranged by 허성진, 홍성준
2nd	《눈을 맞추면》（In Your Eyes）（Drama Ver.)「Are you Human too(너도 인간이니）」 OST Part.7: Release Date：22 July 2018; Language：Korean; Remarks：용주（Yongzoo）feat. 예지(Yezi); Labels: OU	1. 눈을 맞추면（Drama Ver.); 2. 눈을 맞추면 (Drama Ver.) (Inst.)	Composed by 허성진, 홍성준; Lyrics by 허성진, 이소원, 예지; Arranged by 허성진, 홍성준
3rd	《一見鍾情》(《눈을 맞추면》（In Your Eyes） Chinese Version): Release Date：23 July 2018; Language： Mandarin; Remark：용주（Yongzoo）(Solo version); Labels: OU, Nuplay	1. 一見鍾情	Composed by 허성진, 홍성준; Lyrics by Unknown; Arranged by 허성진, 홍성준
4th	《Think About You》The Third Charm(제3의매력）OST Part.3: Release Date：12 October 2018; Language： Korean; Labels: OU	1. Think About You	Composed by 서재하, 김영성; Lyrics by 황석주, 서재하, 김영성; Arranged by 서재하, 김영성
5th	더 팬 (The Fan) 2ROUND Part.2: Release Date：22 December 2018; Language： Korean; Labels: Kakao M	1. 우리 둘만 아는(Only we know)	Composed by 윤건; Lyrics by 윤건; Arranged by 권태은
6th	더 팬 (The Fan) 3ROUND Part.1: Release Date：29 December 2018; Language： Korean; Labels: Kakao M	1. 구애 (求愛) (Propose)	Composed by 선우정아; Lyrics by 선우정아; Arranged by 권태은
7th	더 팬 (The Fan) 4ROUND Part.2: Release Date：1 January 2019; Language： Korean; Labels: Kakao M	1. 잠시 길을 잃다(Lost my way)	Composed by 정석원; Lyrics by 정석원; Arranged by 권태은
8th	[레드슈즈] OST : 멀린 테마: Release Date：7 July 2019; Language： Korean; Labels: Locus, Line Friends	1. 아름다운 그대; 2. 아름다운 그대 (Inst.)	
9th	그게 좋더라구: Release Date：25 September 2019; Language： Korean; Labels: OU, MostWorks, Nuplay	1. 그게 좋더라구; 2. 그게 좋더라구 (Inst.)	

=== Other releases ===
No.	Release Date	Title	Remark
1–3	Oct 2015 – May 2016	– Top Now (Super Idol Season 1 Theme Song) – 準備好沒有 – Turn it up (Super Idol Season 2 Theme Song)	with other Super Idol contestants
4	25 August 2017	빛이 보여 (See the Light)	Ferdy's Project Vol.1; Ferdy X Jhomie: Produced by Ferdy; Composed by Ferdy; Lyrics by 리쥬, Ferdy, 제이호미(jhomie); Arranged by Ferdy
5	9 January 2018	그 자리에서 (at that place)	Ferdy's Project Vol.2; Ferdy X Jhomie: Produced by Ferdy; Composed by Ferdy, 제이호미(jhomie); Lyrics by Ferdy, 제이호미(jhomie); Arranged by Ferdy

== Filmography ==
	Date	Programme Title	Network	Results
1	4 March 2016 – 20 May 2016	Super idol Season 2 (슈퍼아이돌 시즌2)	China's Anhui Satellite TV and South Korea's MBC Music TV	The first winner of season 2

Television series
Date	Programme	Network	Role	Stage Performance	Remarks
24 November 2018	The Fan 더팬 Episode 1 – Round 1	SBS	Contestant	PARK WON (박원) – "Try" (노력)	Recommended by Han Chae-young
22 December 2018	The Fan더팬 Episode 5 – Round 2	SBS	Contestant	Yoon Gun (윤건) – "Only we know" (우리 둘만 아는)	
29 December 2018	The Fan더팬 Episode 6 – Round 3	SBS	Contestant	Sunwoo Jung A (선우정아) – "Propose" (구애)	
