= Story TV =

Korean drama production company

- Story TV logo
- Native name: 스토리티비
- Company type: Small and medium-sized enterprises
- Genre: Korean drama
- Founded: October 27, 2010
- Founder: Bae sun-hae
- Headquarters: 12th floor, Digital broadcasting contents support center "Bitmaru", 60 Taegeuk-ro, Ilsandong-gu, Goyang, Gyeonggi Province, South Korea
- Key people: Bae jin-sub (CEO)
- Products: TV series
- Services: TV series production
- Revenue: Less than 500 million won (December 2016)
- Number of employees: 1~20 (December 2016)
- Website: www.storytv.co.kr

Story TV (Korean: 스토리티비) is a Korean drama production company.

== Works ==
Year	Title	Original title	Network	Notes
2011	The Clinic for Married Couples: Love and War	부부클리닉 사랑과 전쟁2	KBS2	Drama anthology; Co-produced with KBS N, Celltrion Entertainment etc.
2011	While You Were Sleeping	당신이 잠든 사이	SBS TV	Co-produced with Jerry Boys Contents
2012	My Shining Girl	자체발광 그녀	KBS N	Co-produced with SH Creative Works
2012	Immortal Classic	불후의 명작	Channel A	
2013	Jang Ok-jung, Living by Love	장옥정, 사랑에 살다	SBS TV	
2014	Endless Love	끝없는 사랑	SBS TV	
2017	Jugglers	저글러스	KBS2	
2018	About Time	어바웃 타임	tvN	Co-produced with Studio Dragon
2020	It's Okay to Not Be Okay	사이코지만 괜찮아	tvN	Co-produced with Studio Dragon and Gold Medalist
2021	Undercover	언더커버	JTBC	Co-produced with JTBC Studios
2022	Love Is for Suckers	얼어죽을 연애 따위	ENA	
2023	Kokdu: Season of Deity	얼어꼭두의 계절	MBC TV	Co-produced with People Story Company
