= Goldmedalist =

South Korean entertainment management company

GOLDMEDALIST Co., Ltd.
- Logo since 2019
- Native name: 골드메달리스트
- Type: Private
- Industry: Entertainment
- Founded: 2019; 7 years ago in Seoul, South Korea
- Founder: Lee Sa-rang; Kim Mi-hye
- Headquarters: Seongdong-gu, Seoul, South Korea
- Area served: Asia
- Key people: Ahn Sung-soo (CEO)
- Services: Artist Management; Film/TV Production
- Owner: Lee Sa-rang; Kim Mi-hye
- Website: goldmedalist.com

Goldmedalist (Korean: 골드메달리스트; stylized in all caps) is a privately held South Korean entertainment company established in 2019 by Lee Sa-rang and Kim Mi-hye. It currently manages actors Kim Soo-hyun and Seol In-ah. It has also co-produced the television series It's Okay to Not Be Okay in 2020 and One Ordinary Day in 2021.

== Establishment ==
Goldmedalist was established by director Lee Sa-rang and producer Kim Mi-hye, who have worked with Kim Soo-hyun since the 2009 Korean drama Will It Snow for Christmas?. Along with Kim Soo-hyun, the company recruited actresses Seo Yea-ji and Kim Sae-ron.

== Artists ==
=== Current ===
- Kim Soo-hyun (2020–present)
- Seol In-ah (2022–present)
- Choi Hyun-wook (2020–present)
- Kim Su-gyeom (2020–present)
- Kim Seung-ho (2020–present)
- Lee Jong-hyun (2020–present)
- Yoo Eun-ji (2021–present)
- Jeong Han-seol (2022–present)
- Kim Si-eun (2023–present)
- Song Ga-yeon (2024–present)

=== Former ===
- Kim Sae-ron (2020–2022)
- Jo Seung-hee (2020–2023)
- Lee Chae-min (2020–2025)
- Seo Yea-ji (2020–2023)

== Works ==
=== Television series ===
Key
†	Denotes television series that have not yet been broadcast

Title	Year	Original title	Original Network	Associated production	Ref.
It's Okay to Not Be Okay	2020	사이코지만 괜찮아	tvN	Studio Dragon; Story TV	
One Ordinary Day	2021	어느 날	Coupang Play	Studio M; Chorokbaem Media	
