= List of South Korean films of 2009 =

This is a list of South Korean films that received a domestic theatrical release in 2009.

== Box office ==
The highest-grossing South Korean films released in 2009, by domestic box office gross revenue, are as follows:

Highest-grossing films released in 2009
Rank	Title	Distributor	Domestic gross
1	Tidal Wave	CJ Entertainment	$65,849,594
2	Take Off	Showbox	$46,786,488
3	Jeon Woo-chi: The Taoist Wizard	CJ Entertainment	$35,833,732
4	My Girlfriend Is an Agent	Lotte Cultureworks	$21,439,017
5	Running Turtle	Showbox	$16,756,015
6	Mother	CJ Entertainment	$16,245,295
7	Old Partner	IndieStory	$15,503,466
8	Good Morning President	CJ Entertainment	$15,089,690
9	Closer to Heaven	CJ Entertainment	$12,665,384
10	Thirst	CJ Entertainment	$12,074,516

== Released ==
Released	English title	Korean title	Director	Admissions	Ref.
15 January	Old Partner	워낭소리	Lee Chung-ryoul	2,936,650	
22 January	City of Damnation	유감스러운 도시	Kim Dong-weon	1,555,039	
5 February	Daytime Drinking	낮술	Noh Young-seok	24,895	
5 February	Marine Boy	마린보이	Yoon Jong-seok	833,696	
5 February	The Naked Kitchen	키친	Hong Ji-young	142,422	
12 February	The Scam	작전	Lee Ho-jae	1,536,642	
19 February	Handphone	핸드폰	Kim Han-min	629,463	
19 February	Oishii Man	오이시맨	Kim Jeong-joong	8,056	
26 February	My Heart Is Not Broken Yet	나의 마음은 지지 않았다	Ahn Hae-ryong	2,380	
26 February	Oh! My God 2	구세주 2	Hwang Seung-jae	118,288	
5 March	Sydney in Love	시드니 인 러브	Chang		
11 March	More Than Blue	슬픔보다 더 슬픈 이야기	Won Tae-yeon	724,206	
12 March	The Day After	어떤 개인 날	Lee Suk-gyung		
12 March	Members of the Funeral	장례식의 멤버	Baek Seung-bin	129	
12 March	The Room Nearby	그녀들의 방	Goh Tae-jeong		
12 March	The Story of Mr. Sorry	제불찰씨 이야기	Kim Il-hyeon; Kwak In-keun; Lee Eun-mi; Lee Hye-jeong; Ryoo Ji-na		
19 March	Grandmother's Flower	할매꽃	Moon Jeong-hyeon	928	
19 March	Missing	실종	Kim Seong-hong	651,508	
2 April	Calling	소명	Shin Hyeon-won	90,813	
2 April	Private Eye	그림자 살인	Park Dae-min	1,907,094	
9 April	Why Did You Come to My House	우리집에 왜왔니	Hwang Soo-ah	215,807	
16 April	Breathless	똥파리	Yang Ik-june	120,789	
16 April	To Live - Save Our Saemankum	살기 위하여	Lee Kang-kil	652	
23 April	My Girlfriend Is an Agent	7급 공무원	Sin Tae-ra	4,075,983	
23 April	Sisters on the Road	지금, 이대로가 좋아요	Boo Ji-young	18,997	
30 April	Insadong Scandal	인사동 스캔들	Park Hee-gon	1,201,006	
30 April	Land of Scarecrows	허수아비들의 땅	Roh Gyeong-tae		
30 April	Thirst	박쥐	Park Chan-wook	2,223,077	
7 May	Soon-ji	순지	Park Kwang-man		
14 May	Castaway on the Moon	김씨 표류기	Lee Hae-joon	728,273	
14 May	Cyborg She	싸이보그 그녀	Kwak Jae-yong	20,537	
14 May	Like You Know It All	잘 알지도 못하면서	Hong Sang-soo	38,497	
14 May	Old Man and the Land	길	Junho Kim		
21 May	One Step More to the Sea	바다 쪽으로, 한 뼘 더	Choi Ji-yeong	695	
28 May	Boat	보트	Kim Young-nam	12,879	
28 May	Mother	마더	Bong Joon-ho	3,002,572	
4 June	3xMTF	3xMTF	Kim Il-rhan		
4 June	Hello, Stranger	처음 만난 사람들	Kim Dong-hyun		
4 June	Thirsty, Thirsty	물 좀 주소	Hong Hyun-gi	980	
4 June	Where is Ronny...	로니를 찾아서	Sim Sang-kook		
11 June	Himalaya, Where the Wind Dwells	히말라야, 바람이 머무는 곳	Jeon Soo-il	8,373	
11 June	If You Were Me 4	시선 1318	Bang Eun-jin; Jeon Kye-soo; Kim Tae-yong; Lee Hyun-seung; Yoon Seong-ho	5,221	
11 June	Running Turtle	거북이 달린다	Lee Yeon-woo	3,052,223	
18 June	A Blood Pledge	여고괴담 5 - 동반자살	Lee Jong-yong	651,284	
18 June	The Pit and the Pendulum	약탈자들	Sohn Young-sung		
25 June	Bandhobi	반두비	Sin Dong-il	7,019	
1 July	Bronze Medalist	킹콩을 들다	Park Geon-yong	1,271,136	
9 July	Five Senses of Eros	오감도	Byeon Hyeok; Hur Jin-ho; Min Kyu-dong; Oh Ki-hwan; Yu Young-sik	437,714	
9 July	Something to do Before Dying	죽기 전에 해야할 몇가지 것들	Park Seong-beom		
15 July	Chaw	차우	Sin Jeong-won	1,791,124	
15 July	My Father	아부지	Bae Hae-seong	23,560	
23 July	Haeundae	해운대	Yoon Je-kyoon	11,396,153	
29 July	Take off	국가대표	Kim Yong-hwa	8,088,151	
6 August	The Code of a Duel	도시락	Yeo Myung-jun		
6 August	A Million	10억	Jo Min-ho	439,040	
6 August	Yasukuni	야스쿠니	Ying Li	243	
12 August	4th Period Mystery	4교시 추리영역	Lee Sang-yong	67,234	
12 August	Possessed	불신지옥	Lee Yong-ju	249,824	
20 August	The Pot	독	Kim Tae-gon		
20 August	Sophie's Revenge	소피의 연애 매뉴얼	Eva Jin	80,561	
20 August	Yoga	요가학원	Yoo Jae-yeon	269,952	
27 August	Treeless Mountain	나무없는 산	Kim So-yong	7,086	
3 September	Exhausted	고갈	Kim Gok		
9 September	Ae-ja	애자	Jeong Gi-hoon	1,904,713	
9 September	The Case of Itaewon Homicide	이태원 살인사건	Hong Ki-seon	534,939	
10 September	Short! Short! Short! 2009	황금시대	Chae-gi; Choi Ik-hwan; Kim Eun-kyeong; Kim Jong-kwan; Kim Seong-ho; Kim Young-nam; Lee Song-hee-il; Nam Da-jeong; Yang Hae-hoon; Yoon Seong-ho	3,456	
24 September	Closer to Heaven	내 사랑 내 곁에	Park Jin-pyo	2,146,279	
24 September	Fly, Penguin	날아라 펭귄	Yim Soon-rye	20,814	
24 September	How to Live on Earth	지구에서 사는 법	Ahn Seul-gi		
24 September	The Sword with No Name	불꽃처럼 나비처럼	Kim Yong-gyoon	1,681,640	
26 September	Flying Giants	나는 갈매기	Kwon Sang-joon	108,958	
8 October	Hello My Love	헬로우 마이 러브	Kim Aaron	9,800	
8 October	Let the Blue River Run	푸른 강은 흘러라	Kang Mi-ja	185	
8 October	A Good Rain Knows	호우시절	Hur Jin-ho	289,640	
8 October	Where is Jung Seung-pil	정승필 실종사건	Kang Seok-beom	322,501	
15 October	City of Fathers	부산	Park Ji-won	155,928	
15 October	Tears in the Arctic	북극의 눈물	Heo Tae-jeong; Jo Beom-goo	7,547	
22 October	Good Morning President	굿모닝 프레지던트	Jang Jin	2,206,589	
22 October	LaLa Sunshine	라라 선샤인	Kim Aaron		
22 October	Maybe	토끼와 리저드	Joo Ji-hong	5,964	
28 October	Sky and Sea	하늘과 바다	Oh Dal-gyoon	17,859	
29 October	A Brand New Life	여행자	Ounie Lecomte	12,947	
29 October	Paju	파주	Park Chan-ok	118,500	
29 October	Today and the Other Days	저녁의 게임	Choi Wee-an	2,159	
5 November	A Blind River	귀향	Ahn Sun-kyoung		
5 November	The Executioner	집행자	Choi Jin-ho	194,077	
5 November	Kiss Me, Kill Me	킬 미	Yang Jong-hyeon	39,769	
5 November	The Relation of Face, Mind and Love	내 눈에 콩깍지	Lee Jang-soo	41,970	
5 November	Searching for the Elephant	펜트하우스 코끼리	Jeong Seung-goo	98,220	
11 November	Fortune Salon	청담보살	Kim Jin-yeong	353,336	
12 November	19-Nineteen	19-Nineteen	Jang Yong-woo		
12 November	Heaven's Postman	천국의 우편배달부	Lee Hyung-min		
12 November	Visitors	어떤 방문	Hong Sang-soo; Lav Diaz; Naomi Kawase		
13 November	A Camel Doesn't Leave Desert	낙타는 말했다	Jo Kyoo-jang		
19 November	White Night	백야행 - 하얀 어둠 속을 걷다	Park Shin-woo	949,632	
19 November	Triangle	트라이앵글	Ji Yeong-soo		
26 November	Descendants of Hong Gil-dong	홍길동의 후예	Jeong Yong-ki		
26 November	I Am Happy	나는 행복합니다	Yoon Jong-chan		
26 November	Paradise	파라다이스	Lee Jang-soo		
26 November	Shared Streets	샘터분식 - 그들도 우리처럼	Tae Joon-sik		
26 November	Wish	바람	Lee Seong-han		
3 December	After the Banquet	결혼식 후에	Kim Yoon-cheol		
3 December	Dance of Time	시간의 춤	Song Il-gon		
3 December	Flight	비상	Park Jeong-hoon		
3 December	Secret	시크릿	Yoon Jae-goo		
10 December	Actresses	여배우들	E J-yong		
10 December	A Dream Comes True	돌멩이의 꿈	Jang Yong-woo		
17 December	Girlfriends	걸프렌즈	Kang Suk-bum	107,946	
17 December	Just Friends?	친구 사이?	Kim Jho Kwang-soo		
17 December	Missing Person	사람을 찾습니다	Lee Seo		
17 December	What Do You Do?	좋아서 만든 영화	Go Daloo; Kim Momo		
23 December	Jeon Woo-chi: The Taoist Wizard	전우치	Choi Dong-hoon		

== See also ==
- 2009 in South Korea
- 2009 in South Korean music
- List of 2009 box office number-one films in South Korea
