= 46th Grand Bell Awards =

2009 edition of award ceremony

- Date: November 6, 2009
- Site: Olympic Hall, Olympic Park, Seoul
- Hosted by: Han Ye-seul; Choi Ki-hwan

The Grand Bell Awards (Korean: 대종상 영화제; RR: Daejongsang Yeonghwajae), also known as Daejong Film Awards, are determined and presented annually by The Motion Pictures Association of Korea for excellence in film in South Korea. The Grand Bell Awards were first presented in 1962 and have gained prestige as the Korean equivalent of the American Academy Awards.

== 46th ceremony ==
The 46th Grand Bell Awards ceremony was held at the Olympic Hall, Olympic Park in Seoul on November 6, 2009 and hosted by Han Ye-seul and announcer Choi Ki-hwan.

== Nominations and winners ==
(Winners denoted in bold)

| Best Film | Best Director |
|---|---|
| **The Divine Weapon**; Haeundae; Mother; Sky and Sea; Take Off | **Kim Yong-hwa** - **Take Off**; Bong Joon-ho - Mother; Jeon Yun-su - Portrait of a Beauty; Jeong Gi-hun - Goodbye Mom; Yoon Je-kyoon - Haeundae |
| Best Actor | Best Actress |
| **Kim Myung-min** - **Closer to Heaven**; Ha Jung-woo - Take Off; Jung Jae-young - The Divine Weapon; Kim Yoon-seok - Running Turtle; Sul Kyung-gu - Haeundae | **Soo Ae** - **Sunny**; Choi Kang-hee - Goodbye Mom; Jang Na-ra - Sky and Sea; Kim Hye-ja - Mother; Kim Min-sun - Portrait of a Beauty |
| Best Supporting Actor | Best Supporting Actress |
| **Jin Goo** - **Mother**; Jang Keun-suk - The Case of Itaewon Homicide; Jung Kyung-ho - Sunny; Kim In-kwon - Haeundae; Kim Nam-gil - Modern Boy | **Kim Young-ae** - **Goodbye Mom**; Choo Ja-hyun - Portrait of a Beauty; Kim Bo-yeon - Possessed; Kim Hae-sook - Thirst; Nam Neung-mi - Closer to Heaven; Uhm Jung-hwa - Haeundae |
| Best New Actor | Best New Actress |
| **Kang Ji-hwan** - **My Girlfriend Is an Agent**; Cha Seung-woo - Go Go 70s; Kim Nam-gil - Modern Boy; So Ji-sub - Rough Cut; Song Chang-eui - Once Upon a Time in Seoul | **Kim Kkot-bi** - **Breathless**; Hyun Jyu-ni - Sky and Sea; Lee Young-eun - Summer Whispers; Park Bo-young - Scandal Makers; Sunwoo Sun - Running Turtle |
| Best New Director | Best Screenplay |
| **Lee Ho-jae** - **The Scam**; Jang Hoon - Rough Cut; Kim Eun-joo - Summer Whispers; Park Gun-yong - Lifting Kingkong; Yang Ik-june - Breathless | **Kim Ki-duk, Jang Hoon, Ok Jin-gon, Oh Se-yeon** - **Rough Cut**; Jeong Gi-hun - Goodbye Mom; Kim Mi-hyeon - Handphone; Lee Hae-jun - Castaway on the Moon; Lee Yong-ju - Possessed |
| Best Cinematography | Best Editing |
| **Park Hee-ju** - **Portrait of a Beauty**; Hong Kyung-pyo - Mother; Kim Young-ho - Haeundae; Lee Mo-gae - The Good, the Bad, the Weird; Park Hyun-cheol - Take Off | **Kim Hyeon** - **The Divine Weapon**; Kim Sang-bum, Kim Jae-bum - Go Go 70s; Nam Na-yeong - The Good, the Bad, the Weird; Nam Na-yeong - Scandal Makers; Park Gok-ji - Take Off |
| Best Art Direction | Best Lighting |
| **Kim Ki-chul** - **A Frozen Flower**; Cho Hwa-sung - The Good, the Bad, the Weird; Jeon Kyung-ran - Antique; Jo Sang-gyeong - Modern Boy; Lee Ha-jun - Portrait of a Beauty | **Park Hyun-won** - **Thirst**; Im Jae-young - The Divine Weapon; Kim Seung-gyu - Portrait of a Beauty; Lee Sung-jae - Scandal Makers; Yoon Ji-won - A Frozen Flower |
| Best Costume Design | Best Music |
| **Kwon Yu-jin** - **The Good, the Bad, the Weird**; Jo Sang-gyeong - Modern Boy; Lee Hye-soon, Jeong Jeong-eun - A Frozen Flower; Lee Yu-suk - Portrait of a Beauty; Shim Hyun-sub - Sunny | **Kim Jun-seok** - **A Frozen Flower**; Bang Jun-seok - Go Go 70s; Kim Jun-seok - Scandal Makers; Lee Byung-woo - Mother; Lee Eung-do - Sky and Sea |
| Best Visual Effects | Best Sound Effects |
| **Jeong Seong-jin** - **Take Off**; Hans Ulrich, Jang Seong-ho - Haeundae; Jeong Seong-jin, Han Young-woo - The Divine Weapon; Kang Jong-ik, Son Seung-hyeon - Modern Boy; Kim Wook - The Good, the Bad, the Weird | **Oh Se-jin** - **The Divine Weapon**; Eun Hee-soo - Haeundae; Kim Kyung-tae - The Good, the Bad, the Weird; Oh Seong-jin - Chaw; Park Jong-kun - Go Go 70s |
| Best Planning | Popularity Award |
| **Yoon Je-kyoon** - **Haeundae**; Kim Moo-ryoung - Castaway on the Moon; Kim So-yong - Treeless Mountain; Kim Yong-hwa, Kim Min-seok, Shim Young, Kim Ho-seong - Take Off; Lee Young-in - The Divine Weapon | **Kim Myung-min** - **Closer to Heaven**; **Park Bo-young** - **Scandal Makers** |
| Best Short Film | Best Short Film Director |
| **Last Homecoming** | **Kang Dong-hun** - **Good Night** |
| Special Jury Prize | Participation Prize |
| **Mommy, Kitty & Me** | **Meet Parents**; **Solo** |
Lifetime Achievement Award
**Kang Dae-seon**
