= 46th Baeksang Arts Awards =

2010 South Korean award ceremony

- Date: March 26, 2010
- Site: Hae Main Hall, National Theater of Korea
- Hosted by: Kim Ah-joong; Lee Hwi-jae

Television coverage
- Network: KBS2

The 46th Baeksang Arts Awards ceremony was held at Hae Main Hall of the National Theater of Korea in Seoul on March 26, 2010. It was presented by IS Plus Corp. and broadcast on KBS2. TV presenter Lee Hwi-jae and actress Kim Ah-joong hosted the ceremony.

== Nominations and winners ==
Complete list of nominees and winners:

(Winners denoted in bold)

=== Film ===
Grand Prize (Film)
**Yoon Je-kyoon – Haeundae**
Best Film	Best Screenplay
**Take Off**; Haeundae; Mother; Secret Reunion; Thirst	**Jang Min-seok** – **Secret Reunion**; Bong Joon-ho, Park Eun-kyo – Mother; Lee Hae-jun – Castaway on the Moon; Lee Yong-ju – Possessed; Park Geon-yong, Bae Se-young – Lifting King Kong
Best Actor (Film)	Best Actress (Film)
**Ha Jung-woo – Take Off as Heon-tae/Bob**; Jung Jae-young – Castaway on the Moon as Kim Seung-geun; Gang Dong-won – Secret Reunion as Song Ji-won; Kim Yoon-seok – Running Turtle as Jo Pil-seong; Won Bin – Mother as Do-joon	**Ha Ji-won** – **Closer to Heaven as Lee Ji-soo**; Choi Kang-hee – Goodbye Mom as Park Ae-ja; Kim Hye-ja – Mother as Mother; Kim Ok-vin – Thirst as Tae-ju; Seo Woo – Paju as Choi Eun-mo
Best New Actor (Film)	Best New Actress (Film)
**Lee Min-ki** – **Haeundae as Choi Hyung-sik**; Kim Ji-seok – Take Off as Chil-gu; Kim Mu-yeol – The Scam as Jo Min-hyeong; Yang Ik-june – Breathless as Sang-hoon; Yoo Seung-ho – 4th Period Mystery as Han Jung-hoon	**Jo An** – **Lifting King Kong as Park Young-ja**; Baek Jin-hee – Bandhobi as Min-seo; Kang Ye-won – Harmony as Kang Yu-mi; Kim Kkot-bi – Breathless as Yeon-hee; Sunwoo Sun – Jeon Woo-chi: The Taoist Wizard as Goblin
Best Director (Film)	Best New Director (Film)
**Jang Hoon** – **Secret Reunion**; Bong Joon-ho – Mother; Kim Yong-hwa – Take Off; Park Chan-ok – Paju; Yoon Je-kyoon – Haeundae	**Lee Ho-jae** – **The Scam**; Jeong Gi-hun – Goodbye Mom; Park Geon-yong – Lifting King Kong; Park Hee-gon – Insadong Scandal; Yang Ik-june – Breathless
Most Popular – Actor (Film)	Most Popular – Actress (Film)
**Jang Keun-suk** – **The Case of Itaewon Homicide as Robert J. Pearson**	**Choi Kang-hee** – **Goodbye Mom as Park Ae-ja**

=== Television ===
Grand Prize (Television)
**Go Hyun-jung** – **Queen Seondeok**
Best Drama	Best Screenplay
**Iris**; Brilliant Legacy; Queen of Housewives; Queen Seondeok; The Slave Hunters	**Chun Sung-il** – **The Slave Hunters**; Kim Young-hyun, Park Sang-yeon – Queen Seondeok; Park Ji-eun – Queen of Housewives; Shin Jae-won, Lee Ji-hyang, Choi Yi-rang, Lee Jae-yoon – Tamra, the Island; So Hyun-kyung – Brilliant Legacy
Best Educational Program	Best Entertainment Program
**Tears of the Amazon**	**High Kick Through the Roof**
Best Director (Television)	Best New Director (Television)
**Go Dong-sun** – **Queen of Housewives**; Hong Sung-chang – You're Beautiful; Kim Byeong-wook, Kim Chang-dong, Kim Young-ki- High Kick Through the Roof; Park Hong-gyun, Kim Geun-hong – Queen Seondeok; Yang Yun-ho, Kim Kyu-tae – Iris	**Yoo Hyun-ki** – **Master of Study**; Kwak Jung-hwan – The Slave Hunters; Jin Hyuk – Brilliant Legacy; Baek Soo-chan – Dream; Park Young-soo – Family's Honor
Best Actor (Television)	Best Actress (Television)
**Lee Byung-hun – Iris as Kim Hyun-jun**; Jang Hyuk – The Slave Hunters as Lee Dae-gil; Kim Soo-ro – Master of Study as Kang Suk-ho; So Ji-sub – Cain and Abel as Lee Cho-in/Oh Kang-ho; Yoon Sang-hyun – Queen of Housewives as Heo Tae-joon	**Kim Nam-joo – Queen of Housewives as Chun Ji-ae**; Go Hyun-jung – Queen Seondeok as Lady Mishil; Han Hyo-joo – Brilliant Legacy as Go Eun-sung; Kim So-yeon – Iris as Kim Seon-hwa; Kim Tae-hee – Iris as Choi Seung-hee
Best New Actor (Television)	Best New Actress (Television)
**Kim Nam-gil – Queen Seondeok as Bidam**; Choi Daniel – High Kick Through the Roof as Lee Ji-hoon; Lee Seung-gi – Brilliant Legacy as Sunwoo Hwan; Yoo Seung-ho – Master of Study as Hwang Baek-hyun; Yoon Shi-yoon – High Kick Through the Roof as Jeong Jun-hyeok	**Hwang Jung-eum – High Kick Through the Roof as Hwang Jung-eum**; Go Ah-sung – Master of Study as Gil Pul-ip; Lee Min-jung – Smile, You as Seo Jung-in; Seo Woo – Tamra, the Island as Jang Beo-jin; Shin Se-kyung – High Kick! (season 2) as Shin Se-kyung
Best Variety Performer – Male	Best Variety Performer – Female
**Park Seong-ho – Gag Concert**	**Kang Yu-mi, Ahn Young-mi – Gag Concert**
Most Popular – Actor (Television)	Most Popular – Actress (Television)
**Lee Seung-gi – Brilliant Legacy as Sunwoo Hwan**	**Lim Yoona – Cinderella Man as Seo You-jin**

=== Other awards ===
- **InStyle Fashionista Award** – Son Ye-jin
- **Lifetime Achievement Award** – Bae Sam-ryong
