= List of 2009 box office number-one films in South Korea =

This is a list of films which placed number-one at the South Korean box office during 2009, based on admissions.

== Number-one films ==
Tidal Wave became the highest grossing film of 2009 despite never reaching #1.

Weekend end date	Title	Weekend admissions	Ref.
4 January	A Frozen Flower	745,461	
11 January	A Frozen Flower	519,408	
18 January	Scandal Makers	372,457	
25 January	Red Cliff 2	443,452	
1 February	Red Cliff 2	535,835	
8 February	Marine Boy	415,360	
15 February	The Curious Case of Benjamin Button	394,962	
22 February	Old Partner	419,295	
1 March	Old Partner	365,402	
8 March	Watchmen	262,253	
15 March	More Than Blue	256,809	
22 March	Push	279,822	
29 March	Slumdog Millionaire	220,598	
5 April	Private Eye	466,560	
12 April	Private Eye	370,169	
19 April	Knowing	375,405	
26 April	My Girlfriend is an Agent	588,958	
3 May	Thirst	821,026	
10 May	My Girlfriend is an Agent	448,629	
17 May	Angels & Demons	682,550	
24 May	Terminator Salvation	1,415,780	
31 May	Mother	978,623	
7 June	Night at the Museum: Battle of the Smithsonian	863,156	
14 June	Running Turtle	480,293	
21 June	Running Turtle	581,212	
28 June	Transformers: Revenge of the Fallen	2,109,497	
5 July	Transformers: Revenge of the Fallen	1,404,129	
12 July	Transformers: Revenge of the Fallen	897,120	
19 July	Harry Potter and the Half-Blood Prince	1,208,418	
26 July	Haeundae	1,546,976	
2 August	Haeundae	1,594,033	
9 August	Haeundae	1,276,871	
16 August	Take Off	918,518	
23 August	Take Off	806,069	
30 August	Take Off	585,615	
6 September	Take Off	426,879	
13 September	Goodbye Mom	306,442	
20 September	Goodbye Mom	325,974	
27 September	Closer To Heaven	540,758	
4 October	Closer To Heaven	515,208	
11 October	Closer To Heaven	179,630	
18 October	District 9	302,072	
25 October	Good Morning President	713,116	
1 November	Good Morning President	548,626	
8 November	Good Morning President	337,057	
15 November	2012	1,310,291	
22 November	2012	1,045,817	
29 November	2012	644,451	
6 December	The Twilight Saga: New Moon	642,566	
13 December	The Twilight Saga: New Moon	419,913	
20 December	Avatar	1,388,797	
27 December	Avatar	1,579,028	

== Highest-grossing films ==
Highest-grossing films of 2009 (by admissions)
Rank	Title	Country	Admissions	Domestic gross
1.	Tidal Wave	South Korea	11,324,433	US$71.4 million
2.	Take Off	South Korea	8,035,181	US$50.7 million
3.	Transformers: Revenge of the Fallen	United States	7,392,990	US$44.7 million
4.	2012	United States	5,390,201	US$34.3 million
5.	Avatar	United States	5,150,667	US$38.3 million
6.	Terminator Salvation	United States	4,499,776	US$26.2 million
7.	My Girlfriend Is an Agent	South Korea	4,039,891	US$23.2 million
8.	Scandal Makers	South Korea	3,861,757	US$22.3 million
9.	A Frozen Flower	South Korea	3,296,474	US$19.8 million
10.	Running Turtle	South Korea	3,024,666	US$18.2 million

Highest-grossing domestic films of 2009 (by admissions)
Rank	Title	Admissions	Domestic gross
1.	Tidal Wave	11,324,433	US$71.4 million
2.	Take Off	8,035,181	US$50.7 million
3.	My Girlfriend Is an Agent	4,039,891	US$23.2 million
4.	Scandal Makers	3,861,757	US$22.3 million
5.	A Frozen Flower	3,296,474	US$19.8 million
6.	Running Turtle	3,024,666	US$18.2 million
7.	Mother	2,979,213	US$17.6 million
8.	Old Partner	2,933,897	US$16.8 million
9.	Good Morning President	2,554,960	US$16.4 million
10.	Jeon Woo-chi: The Taoist Wizard	2,453,883	US$15.6 million

== See also ==
- List of South Korean films of 2009
