= 30th Blue Dragon Film Awards =

2009 edition of award ceremony

- Date: December 2, 2009
- Site: KBS Hall, Yeouido, Seoul, South Korea
- Hosted by: Kim Hye-soo; Lee Beom-soo

Television coverage
- Network: KBS

The 30th Blue Dragon Film Awards ceremony was held on December 2, 2009 at the KBS Hall in Yeouido, Seoul, South Korea. Hosted by actors Kim Hye-soo and Lee Beom-soo, it was presented by Sports Chosun and was broadcast on KBS starting at 8PM KST.

== Nominations and winners ==
Complete list of nominees and winners:

(Winners denoted in bold)

Best Film	Best Director
**Mother**; Good Morning President; Haeundae; Take Off; Thirst	**Kim Yong-hwa - Take Off**; Bong Joon-ho - Mother; Jang Jin - Good Morning President; Park Chan-wook - Thirst; Yoon Je-kyoon - Haeundae
Best Actor	Best Actress
**Kim Myung-min - Closer to Heaven as Baek Jong-woo**; Ha Jung-woo - Take Off as Cha Heon-tae/Bob; Jang Dong-gun - Good Morning President as Cha Ji-wook; Kim Yoon-seok - Running Turtle as Jo Pil-seong; Song Kang-ho - Thirst as Sang-hyun	**Ha Ji-won** - **Closer to Heaven as Lee Ji-soo**; Choi Kang-hee - Goodbye Mom as Park Ae-ja; Kim Ha-neul - My Girlfriend Is an Agent as Ahn Soo-ji; Kim Hye-ja - Mother as Mother; Kim Ok-vin - Thirst as Tae-ju
Best Supporting Actor	Best Supporting Actress
**Jin Goo** - **Mother as Jin-tae**; Kim In-kwon - Haeundae as Oh Dong-choon; Lee Min-ki - Haeundae as Choi Hyeong-sik; Shin Ha-kyun - Thirst as Kang-woo; Sung Dong-il - Take Off as Coach Bang	**Kim Hae-sook** - **Thirst as Lady Ra**; Choo Ja-hyun - Portrait of a Beauty as Seol-hwa; Jang Young-nam - My Girlfriend Is an Agent as Team leader Hong; Kim Bo-yeon - Possessed as Mother; Kim Young-ae - Goodbye Mom as Young-hee
Best New Actor	Best New Actress
**Yang Ik-june** - **Breathless as Sang-hoon**; Choi Jae-woong - The Sword with No Name as Noe-jeon; Kim Ji-seok - Take Off as Chil-gu; Kim Mu-yeol - The Scam as Jo Min-hyeong; Song Chang-eui - Once Upon a Time in Seoul as Tae-ho	**Kim Kkot-bi** - **Breathless as Yeon-hee**; **Park Bo-young** - **Scandal Makers as Hwang Jeong-nam**; Kang Ye-won - Haeundae as Kim Hee-mi; Oh Yeon-seo - A Blood Pledge as Yoo-jin; Sunwoo Sun - Running Turtle as Kyeong-joo
Best New Director	Best Screenplay
**Kang Hyeong-cheol - Scandal Makers**; Jeong Gi-hun - Goodbye Mom; Lee Yong-ju - Possessed; Park Gun-yong - Lifting King Kong; Yang Ik-june - Breathless	**Lee Yong-ju** - **Possessed**; Bong Joon-ho, Park Eun-kyo - Mother; Jeong Gi-hun - Goodbye Mom; Kim Yong-hwa - Take Off; Lee Hae-jun - Castaway on the Moon
Best Cinematography	Best Art Direction
**Park Hyun-cheol** - **Take Off**; Choi Hyun-ki - A Frozen Flower; Chung Chung-hoon - Thirst; Hong Kyung-pyo - Mother; Kim Yeong-ho - Haeundae	**Cho Hwa-sung, Choi Hyeon-seok** - **Private Eye**; Kim Ki-chul - A Frozen Flower; Lee Ha-jun - Portrait of a Beauty; Min Eon-ok - The Sword with No Name; Ryu Seong-hui - Thirst
Best Lighting	Best Music
**Choi Cheol-su, Park Dong-sun** - **Mother**; Kim Seung-gyu - Portrait of a Beauty; Lee Seok-hwan - Take Off; Park Hyun-won - Thirst; Yoon Ji-won - A Frozen Flower	**Jo Yeong-wook** - **Thirst**; Kim Jun-seok - Scandal Makers; Lee Byung-woo - Mother; Lee Jae-hak - Take Off; Park Ki-heon - Closer to Heaven
Technical Award	Best Short Film
**Hans Uhlig, Jang Seong-ho** - **Haeundae (CG)**; Hong Seong-ho - Chaw (CG); Jeong Seong-jin - Take Off (CG); Lee Hye-soon, Jeong Jeong-eun - A Frozen Flower (Costume design); Yoon Ye-ryeong - Private Eye (Make-up)	**Gookgyeong**
Popular Star Award	Audience Choice Award for Most Popular Film
**Choi Kang-hee** - **Goodbye Mom**; **Ha Ji-won** - **Closer to Heaven**; **Ha Jung-woo** - **Take Off**; **Lee Byung-hun** - **G.I. Joe: The Rise of Cobra**	**Haeundae**
Special Award
**Jang Jin-young**
