= Ah, Wilderness! (disambiguation) =

Ah, Wilderness! is a 1932 play by Eugene O'Neill.

Ah, Wilderness may also refer to:

- Ah, Wilderness! (film), a 1935 film adaptation directed by Clarence Brown and starring Wallace Beery
- "Ah! Wilderness!", an episode of The Suite Life of Zack & Cody
- Wilderness (2017 film), directed by Yoshiyuki Kishi and starring Masaki Suda
