= Lee Ho-jae =

Lee Ho-jae may refer to:

- Lee Ho-jae (director)
- Lee Ho-jae (actor)
- Lee Ho-jae (footballer)
