= 2010 Shanghai International Film Festival =

Chinese film festival

- Location: Shanghai, China
- Language: International
- Website: http://www.siff.com

The 2010 Shanghai International Film Festival is the 13th such festival devoted to international cinema to be held in Shanghai, China. It was held from June 12–20, 2010.

2327 movies from 81 countries and regions have entered their names for Golden Goblet Award. Five northern European nations, Canada, Germany, Italy, Ireland, Japan, Israel, China and Taiwan showed their films during the Shanghai International Film Festival dedicate for the ongoing Shanghai Expo. In the festival the films echoing with environmental topics because of the World Expo Shanghai's theme "Better City, Better Life." 300 foreign and domestic films were screened in China at 25 cinemas.

The SIFF announced two film projects, CFPC (China Film Pitch and Catch) and Co-FPC (Co-production Film Pitch and Catch) to promote rising filmmakers.

In 2010 SIFFORUM successfully invited Weinstein Company CEO Harvey Weinstein, China Film Group Cooperation chairman Han San Ping, Polybona Films president Yu Dong, plus well-known Chinese directors Feng Xiaogang, He Ping, Wang Xiaoshuai, Leon Dai, Pang Ho-Cheung and Korean director Kang Je-Gyu.

The seven-member jury panel was chaired by Hollywood-based Chinese director John Woo. Many Chinese actresses and stars attended the open ceremony, like Lin Peng, Gan Tingting, Che Yongli, Zhang Jingchu and actor Huang Xiaoming, Gong Xinliang and Hong Kong actor Kar-Ying, Claire Danes and her husband, actor Hugh Dancy, Barbie Shu, Eddie Peng and Chinese actress Yuan Xinyu, Gong Li and actor John Cusack, Adam Brody, Li Bingbing and Hong Kong actor Daniel Wu, the Korean actress Da-hae Lee, Ruby Lin and actor Mike He, Miss World Zhang Zilin of China, Maria Grazia Cucinotta, Hong Kong actress and singer Gillian Chung and director Jeffrey Lau, the Hong Kong actress Cecilia Cheung, Chinese actress Zhao Wei, Director Feng Xiaogang and his actress wife Xu Fan and artists Wang Ziwen, Li Chen, Zhang Jingchu, Lu Yi and producer Wang Zhonglei, Yvonne Yung, Luc Besson, artists Zhang Yang, Gao Yuanyuan, Li Xiaorang, Ruby Lin, Wang Luodan and Liu Ye, and Malaysian-born international artist, Michelle Yeoh.

== Jury ==
The jury members were:

- John Woo (USA) (president of the jury)
- Zhao Wei (China)
- Leos Carax (French)
- Amos Gitai (Israel)
- Bill Guttentag (USA)
- Yōjirō Takita (Japan)
- Wang Xiaoshuai (China)

== In competition ==
Title	Director	Country
Shanghai	Mikael Håfström	United States
Deep in the Clouds	Liu Jie	China
Océans	Jacques Perrin	France
Ocean Heaven	Xue Xiaolu	China
Kiss Me Again	Gabriele Muccino	Italy
Fifty Dead Men Walking	Kari Skogland	Canada
The Wild Hunt	Alexandre Franchi	Canada
The Extraordinary Adventures of Adèle Blanc-Sec	Luc Besson	France
Cast Me If You Can	Atsushi Ogata	Japan
Goodbye Mom	Jeong Gi-hun	South Korea
Crossing the Mountain	Yang Rui	China
Lan	Jiang Wenli	China

== Winners ==
=== Golden Goblet Awards ===
Awards	Winners	Country
Best Film	Kiss Me Again	Italy
Jury Grand Prix	Deep in the Clouds	China
Best Director	Liu Jie for Deep in the Clouds	China
Best Screenplay	Gabriele Muccino for Kiss Me Again	Italy
Best Actor	Christian Ulmen	Germany
Best Actress	Vittoria Puccini	Italy

=== Asian New Talent Award ===
- Best Director
  - Jeong Gi-hun (Korea) for Goodbye Mom
- Best Film
  - Jiang Wenli (China) for Lan
- Jury Prix
  - Jin-ho Choi (Korea) for The Executioner

== See also ==
- 16th Shanghai Television Festival June 7 to June 11
- Yang Qing
