= Kim In-kwon =

South Korean actor

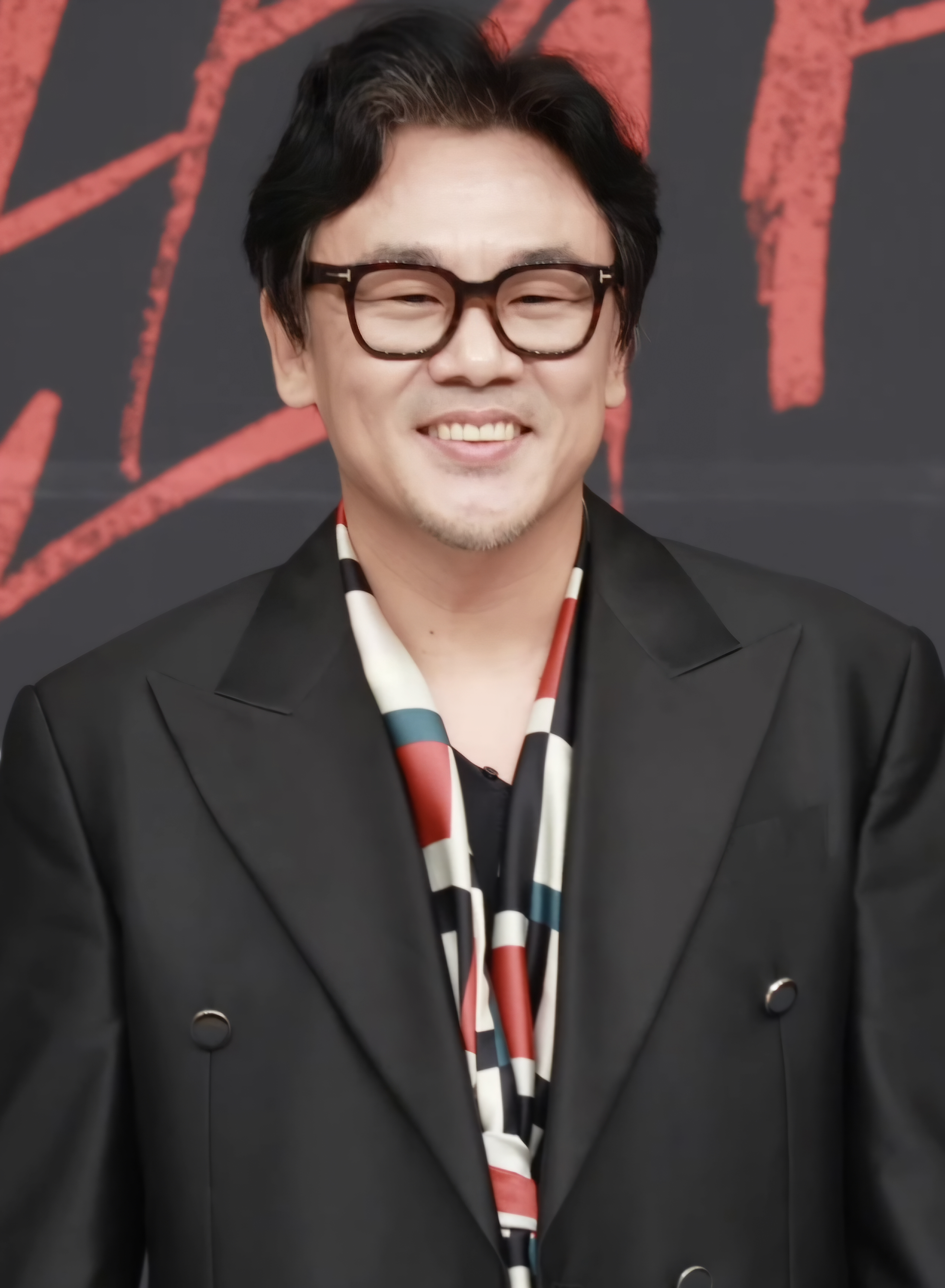
- Kim in September 2024
- Born: January 20, 1978 (age 48); Suyeong-gu, Busan, South Korea
- Education: Dongguk University - Theater and Film
- Occupation: Actor
- Years active: 1999–present
- Agent: YNK Entertainment

Korean name
- Hangul: 김인권
- Hanja: 金吝勸
- RR: Gim Ingwon
- MR: Kim In'gwŏn

Kim In-kwon (Korean: 김인권; born January 20, 1978) is a South Korean actor. Known for playing memorable supporting characters, he starred in his first leading role in the sleeper hit He's on Duty (2010), followed by Almost Che (2012), Born to Sing (2013), and Apostle (2014).

Kim also directed and starred in the 2002 short film Shivski.

== Filmography ==
=== Film ===
Year	Title	Role	Notes/Ref.
1999	Rainbow Trout	Tae-ju	
1999	Fanta Tropical		short film
2000	Peppermint Candy	Sergeant Lee	
2000	Anarchists	Sang-gu	
2000	Taxi of Terror	male teenager 2	
2001	My Wife Is a Gangster	Banse ("Underwear")	
2001	Ciao	adult Tae-won	short film
2002	H	Heo Young-taek	
2002	Shivski	Tae-ju	short film; also credited as director
2003	A Man Who Went to Mars	Ho-geol	
2003	Plastic Tree	Soo	
2003	Please Teach Me English	sergeant	
2004	Once Upon a Time in High School	Jjiksae	
2004	Love, So Divine	seminarian Seon-dal	
2004	Twentidentity		segment: "Fucked Up Shoes"
2007	My Father	Shin Yo-seob / Joseph	
2007	Two Faces of My Girlfriend	Gu-chang's sunbae (cameo)	
2007	Miss Gold Digger	Kim Yoon-cheol	
2008	Fate	Jeong Do-wan	
2009	Tidal Wave	Oh Dong-choon	
2009	Secret	Seok-joon	
2010	The Man Next Door	man with sausage (cameo)	
2010	He's on Duty	Bang Tae-shik / Bang-ga	
2010	Haunters	loan shark (cameo)	
2011	Quick	Kim Myung-shik	
2011	My Way	Jong-dae	
2012	Masquerade	Captain Do	
2012	Almost Che	Kang Dae-oh	
2012	The Tower	Oh Byung-man	
2013	Born to Sing	Bong-nam	
2014	Apostle: He Was Anointed by God	Joo Chul-ho	
2014	The Divine Move	Kkong-soo ("Tricks")	
2014	Tazza: The Hidden Card	Heo Gwang-chul	
2015	C'est Si Bon	Jo Young-nam	(cameo)
2015	Clown of a Salesman	Il-bum	
2015	Himalaya	Park Jeong-bok	
2016	The Map Against The World	Ba Woo	
2017	Daddy You, Daughter Me	Driver	(cameo)
2018	Monstrum	Sung-han	
2018	In Between Seasons	Manager Lee	
2018	Too Hot to Die	Byung Nam	
2018	Revenger	Captain Bau	
2019	The Battle of Jangsari	Ryu Tae-Seok	
2019	Spring, Again	Jinseol	(cameo)
2019	Close Game: Reversed War		
2019	How to Live in This World	Young Wook	
2020	Hot Blooded Detective	Dong Min	
2021	The Cursed: Dead Man's Prey		
2022	Hidden	Director of National Intelligence	
TBA	Executioner's Daughter		

=== Television series ===
Year	Title	Role
2000	Medical Center	Noh Kang-han
2000	8.15 Drama "Seongam Island"	
2001	Lovers	
2001	MBC Best Theater "Letters for Christmas"	
2003	The Bean Chaff of My Life	Jang Sang-doo
2003	Detectives	
2004	Good Morning Gong-ja	Go Kang-seok
2004	2004 Human Market	Sang-gu
2007	Surgeon Bong Dal-hee	Park Jae-bum
2009	You're Beautiful	Ma Hoon-yi
2010	I Live Without Anything	Shin Byung-dae
2012	My Kids Give Me a Headache	Joo Jae-won (cameo)
2016	Come Back Mister	Kim Young-soo
2017	The Liar and His Lover	Teacher Bong
2017	Criminal Minds	An Sang-Chul
2019	Angel's Last Mission: Love	Hoo
2020	How to Buy a Friend	Woo Tae-jung
2020–2021	Mr. Queen	Royal Chef Man-bok
2021	Times	Do Young-jae
2021	The King's Affection	Yang Moon-soo
2022	Cleaning Up	Cheon Deok-gyu
2022	The Good Detective 2	Lee Seong-gon
2023	Kokdu: Season of Deity	Oksin
2023	Heartbeat	Go Yang-nam
2024	The Judge from Hell	Gu Man-do
2025	The Haunted Palace	Kim Eung-soon

=== Variety show ===
Date	Title	Notes/Ref.
2000	Star Survival Dong-geo Dong-rak	
2011	Saturday Night Live Korea	Host

== Theater ==
Year	Title	Role	Ref.
2022	Sleuth	Andrew	

== Awards and nominations ==
Award	Year	Category	Nominated work	Result	Ref.
Blue Dragon Film Awards	2000	Best New Actor	Anarchists	Nominated	
Blue Dragon Film Awards	2009	Best Supporting Actor	Haeundae	Nominated	
Buil Film Awards	2009	Best Supporting Actor	Haeundae	Won	
Buil Film Awards	2012	Best Supporting Actor	My Way	Nominated	
22nd Chunsa Film Art Awards	2017	Popularity Award	—N/a	Won	
Grand Bell Awards	2009	Best Supporting Actor	Haeundae	Nominated	
Grand Bell Awards	2014	Best Supporting Actor	The Divine Move	Nominated	
KBS Drama Awards	2003	Best Actor in a One-Act/Special Drama	The Bean Chaff of My Life	Won	
Korea Film Actor Association Star Night - Korea Top Star Awards Ceremony	2015	Best Supporting Actor	C'est Si Bon	Won	
3rd KOFRA Film Awards	2012	Best Supporting Actor	My Way	Won	
SBS Drama Awards	2007	Best Supporting Actor in a Miniseries	Surgeon Bong Dal-hee	Nominated	
SBS Drama Awards	2016	Excellence Award, Actor in a Fantasy Drama	Come Back Mister	Nominated	
SBS Drama Awards	2024	Best Supporting Actor in a Miniseries	The Judge from Hell	Won	
Scene Stealer Festival	2021	Bonsang "Main Prize"	The King's Affection	Won	
