= Architecture 101 =

2012 South Korean romance film written and directed by Lee Yong-ju

- Theatrical poster
- Hangul: 건축학개론
- Hanja: 建築學槪論
- RR: Geonchukhak gaeron
- MR: Kŏnch'ukhak kaeron
- Directed by: Lee Yong-ju
- Written by: Lee Yong-ju
- Produced by: Shim Jae-myung; Lee Eun
- Starring: Uhm Tae-woong; Han Ga-in; Lee Je-hoon; Bae Suzy
- Cinematography: Jo Sang-yoon
- Edited by: Kim Sang-bum; Kim Jae-bum
- Music by: Lee Ji-soo
- Production company: Myung Films
- Distributed by: Lotte Entertainment
- Release date: March 22, 2012 (South Korea)
- Running time: 118 minutes
- Country: South Korea
- Language: Korean
- Box office: US$26.7 million

Architecture 101 (Korean: 건축학개론; RR: Geonchukhak gaeron; lit. 'Introduction to Architecture') is a 2012 South Korean romance film written and directed by Lee Yong-ju. The film tells the story of two students who meet in an introductory architecture class and fall in love. Fifteen years later, the girl tracks down her first love to seek his help in building her dream house.

== Plot ==
Seoul, the present day. Out of the blue, architect Lee Seung-min (Uhm Tae-woong) is approached by Yang Seo-yeon (Han Ga-in), whom he knew at college some 17 years previously, to design a new house for her on the site of her 30-year-old family home on Jeju Island. Seung-min reluctantly agrees but can't come up with a design that pleases her. In the end, they decide to renovate and expand the existing house, and he and Seo-yeon spend a considerable amount of time together down in Jeju, to the growing annoyance of his fiancée Eun-chae (Go Joon-hee), with whom he is soon to be married and move to the US. As Seo-yeon cares for her dying father (Lee Seung-ho) and Seung-min learns more about what became of Seo-yeon in the intervening years, he recalls their initial meeting at college in the early 1990s.

Seung-min and Seo-yeon (Lee Je-hoon and Suzy) had lived in the same neighborhood (Jeongneung-dong, Seoul) and attended the same architecture class. He remembers her liking rich student Jae-wook (Yoo Yeon-seok), his inability to declare his attraction to her, and the times being coached by his best friend, Nab-ddeuk (Jo Jung-suk) in how to get girls. Hoping to confess his feelings to her at the perfect timing, Seung-min asks Seo-yeon to meet him at the abandoned house they frequent, on the first day that it snows that coming winter. But one night he catches Jae-wook trying to forcibly kiss a drunk Seo-yeon and then makes her entering her house with him. Seung-min doesn’t save her and choose to run away. The first day of snow arrives, and Seo-yeon is left waiting in the abandoned house alone. Heartbroken, she leaves behind her portable CD player with a CD of her favorite artist.

Seo-yeon in the present day receives that very same CD player and CD from Seung-min, meaning that he actually went to the house later and remembered their promise. But despite the bitter-sweetness of their first love, in the end, Seung-min still chooses his fiancée Eun-chae and flies with her to America, while Seo-yeon sits in the house he built for her, listening to the CD.

== Cast ==
- Uhm Tae-woong as Lee Seung-min
  - Lee Je-hoon as young Lee Seung-min
- Han Ga-in as Yang Seo-yeon
  - Bae Suzy as young Yang Seo-yeon
- Go Joon-hee as Eun-chae, Seung-min's fiancée
- Jo Jung-suk as Nab-ddeuk, Seung-min's best friend
- Yoo Yeon-seok as Jae-wook, Seo-yeon's sunbae and Seung-min's rival
- Kim Dong-joo as Seung-min's mother
- Lee Seung-ho as Seo-yeon's father
- Kim Eui-sung as Professor Kang
- Park Soo-young as Architect Koo
- Park Jin-woo as the taxi driver

== Production ==
Director Lee Yong-ju has a bachelor's degree in architecture from Yonsei University, and collaborated with architect Gu Seung-hoe to accurately depict the architectural details shown and mentioned in the film. The film was shot on location in the Seoul neighborhood of Jeong-neung and in Jeju Island.

It was chosen as the closing film at the 15th Shanghai International Film Festival.

In late August 2012, Typhoon Bolaven, regarded as the most powerful storm to strike the Korean Peninsula in nearly a decade, severely damaged Seo-yeon's house that was constructed especially for the movie. The house was rebuilt and renovated, designed by architect Gu Seung-hoe (executive consultant of construction for the film), with the interior design by Woo Seung-mie (the film's art director). It opened in March 2013 as a cafe, called Cafe Seo-yeon's House.

== Music ==
The film reignited 1990s throwback fever among Koreans and made the fashion, music and celebrities of the period cool once again. Songs from the '90s, including duo Exhibition's "Etude of Memory" were included on the score. Characters also use pagers, hair mousse, and portable CD players. The protagonist is even obsessed with GUESS T-shirts - counterfeits that were popular among Koreans in the 1990s. Nostalgia-inducing scenes that feature characters expressing awe at a one gigabyte hard drive computer or communicating with each other via landline telephones also brought the audience back in time.

And the movie's impact on the present-day market was felt. Exhibition, the duo known as JeonRamHwe in Korea, saw a sudden increase in sales of its first EP, which was released in 1993, by 70 times in April compared to the previous month, with sales of the duo's following EPs also on the rise. Yes 24 temporarily made a page on its official website that lists EPs from the 1990s alongside contemporary artists who are known to emulate the sentiments of the 1990s.

== Release ==
Architecture 101 was released in South Korean theaters on March 22, 2012. It was subsequently released in Hong Kong on October 22, 2012.

=== Home video ===
On September 19, 2012, a two-disc limited edition DVD was released containing extra footage shot and edited by the director Lee Yong-ju, audio commentary by actors Uhm Tae-woong, Lee Je-hoon and Suzy, interviews and trailers, and a book containing pictures and production images from the set.

Among the deleted scenes are a flashback scene of Seung-min and Nab-ddeuk walking side by side; adult Seung-min taking a drunk Seo-yeon to her hotel room; and a longer, deeper kiss between Lee Je-hoon and Suzy. The scenes ended up on the cutting room floor because the director felt they did not fit the movie's tone.

== Reception ==
The film captured viewers' attention and earned critical plaudits with its restrained style and well drawn characters.

It held the No. 1 spot at the box office for three weeks after its release, attracting over 1 million viewers in only eight days, passing 2 million in seventeen days, and reaching 3 million on April 18. Male moviegoers are the backbone of the movie's sales, an unusual path to success for a romantic drama. Critics have said that Architecture 101 especially resonates with the nostalgia men feel for their first loves.

It was one of the ten most-watched films in Korea in the first quarter of 2012 (No. 4 with 3.4 million tickets sold). 9 weeks after its theater release, it reached over 4.1 million admissions, a new box office record for Korean melodramas.

== Awards and nominations ==
Year	Award	Category	Recipient	Result	Ref.
2012	48th Baeksang Arts Awards	Best New Actor	Lee Je-hoon	Nominated	
2012	48th Baeksang Arts Awards	Best New Actress	Suzy	Won	
2012	6th Mnet 20's Choice Awards	20's Male Movie Star	Lee Je-hoon	Won	
2012	6th Mnet 20's Choice Awards	20's Female Movie Star	Suzy	Won	
2012	6th Mnet 20's Choice Awards	20's Booming Actor	Jo Jung-suk	Won	
2012	5th Style Icon Awards	First Love Fantasies	Suzy	Won	
2012	16th Puchon International Fantastic Film Festival	Fantasia Award	Lee Je-hoon	Won	
2012	21st Buil Film Awards	Best Film	Architecture 101	Nominated	
2012	21st Buil Film Awards	Best Supporting Actor	Jo Jung-suk	Nominated	
2012	21st Buil Film Awards	Best New Director	Lee Yong-ju	Nominated	
2012	21st Buil Film Awards	Best New Actor	Jo Jung-suk	Nominated	
2012	21st Buil Film Awards	Best New Actress	Suzy	Nominated	
2012	21st Buil Film Awards	Best Screenplay	Lee Yong-ju	Won	
2012	21st Buil Film Awards	Best Cinematography	Jo Sang-yoon	Nominated	
2012	21st Buil Film Awards	Best Music	Lee Ji-soo	Nominated	
2012	49th Grand Bell Awards	Best Director	Lee Yong-ju	Nominated	
2012	49th Grand Bell Awards	Best Supporting Actor	Jo Jung-suk	Nominated	
2012	49th Grand Bell Awards	Best New Actor	Jo Jung-suk	Nominated	
2012	49th Grand Bell Awards	Best New Actress	Suzy	Nominated	
2012	49th Grand Bell Awards	Popularity Award	Suzy	Nominated	
2012	32nd Korean Association of Film Critics Awards	Best Music	Lee Ji-soo	Won	
2012	33rd Blue Dragon Film Awards	Best New Actor	Jo Jung-suk	Won	
2012	33rd Blue Dragon Film Awards	Best New Actress	Suzy	Nominated	
2012	33rd Blue Dragon Film Awards	Best Screenplay	Lee Yong-ju	Nominated	
2012	33rd Blue Dragon Film Awards	Best Cinematography	Jo Sang-yoon	Nominated	
2012	33rd Blue Dragon Film Awards	Best Art Direction	Woo Seung-mi	Nominated	
2012	33rd Blue Dragon Film Awards	Best Lighting	Park Se-mun	Nominated	
2012	33rd Blue Dragon Film Awards	Best Music	Lee Ji-soo	Nominated	
2012	33rd Blue Dragon Film Awards	Popularity Award	Suzy	Won	
2012	20th Korean Culture and Entertainment Awards	Best New Actor	Jo Jung-suk	Won	
2013	4th KOFRA Film Awards	Best New Actor	Jo Jung-suk	Won	
