= Revenger (film) =

2018 film directed by Lee Seung-won

- Teaser poster
- Hangul: 리벤져
- RR: Ribenjeo
- MR: Ribenjŏ
- Directed by: Lee Seung-won
- Written by: Bruce Khan; Ahn Seung-hwan
- Produced by: Yang Jong-gon
- Starring: Bruce Khan; Park Hee-soon; Yoon Jin-seo; Kim In-kwon
- Production company: Green Fish Pictures
- Distributed by: Little Big Pictures
- Release date: December 6, 2018
- Running time: 101 minutes
- Country: South Korea
- Language: Korean
- Box office: US$5,000,000

Revenger (Korean: 리벤져) is a 2018 South Korean action film directed by Lee Seung-won, from a story by Bruce Khan and Ahn Seung-hwan, and produced by Yang Jong-gon under Green Fish Pictures. It stars Bruce Khan in the lead role, alongside Park Hee-soon, Yoon Jin-seo and Kim In-kwon in supporting roles.

Revenger was released on December 6, 2018.

== Plot ==
Kim Yool, a police detective, attempts to kill mob boss Carlos Kun in order to avenge his family's death, but Yool gets arrested and transferred to an island called Sura island, which is a prison for deadly and blood-hungry criminals. Yool learns that Carlos is also serving his prison term on the island and sets out to finish him. Yool also meets a child Jin and his mother Maly, who despised Yool as he was the one who imprisoned her in the island. However, Maly later forgives him after he saved Jin's life from Carlos' henchmen. Along with Maly and other prisoners, Yool clashes with Carlos' henchman and kills them. Yool confronts Carlos at his hideout and a battle ensues, where Yool finally kills Carlos and escapes from the island, thus avenging his family's death.

== Cast ==
- Bruce Khan as Yool
- Park Hee-soon as Carlos Kun
- Yoon Jin-seo as Maly
- Kim In-kwon as Bau
- Park Chul-min
- Kim Na-yeon
- Jeon Soo-Jin as Kun's henchwoman

== Production ==
Principal photography began on October 9, 2017, and wrapped on April 27, 2018, with portions filmed in Indonesia.
