= Sunwoo Sun =

South Korean actress (born 1975)

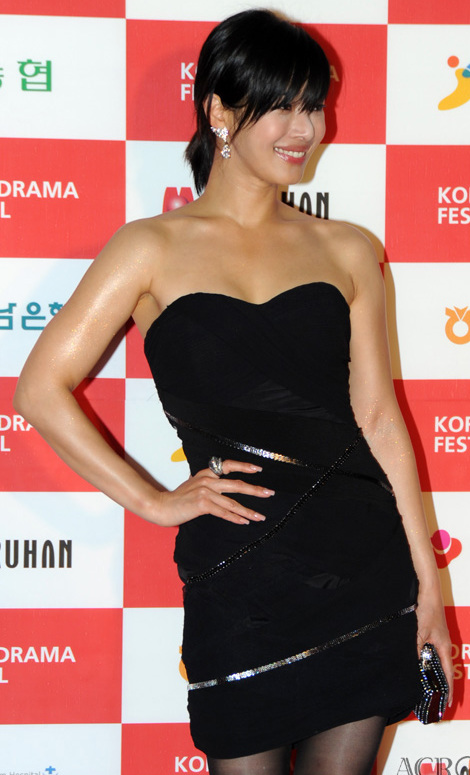
- Sunwoo in 2010
- Born: Jung Yoo-jin; March 21, 1975 (age 51); Incheon, South Korea
- Education: Incheon National University – Physical Education
- Occupation: Actress
- Years active: 2003–present
- Agent: Gwangyun International

Korean name
- Hangul: 정유진
- RR: Jeong Yujin
- MR: Chŏng Yujin

Stage name
- Hangul: 선우선
- RR: Seonu Seon
- MR: Sŏnu Sŏn

Sunwoo Sun (Korean: 선우선; born March 21, 1975), birth name Jung Yoo-jin, is a South Korean actress. She made her acting debut in 2003, but rose to stardom in 2009 with the television drama Queen of Housewives. Other notable films and series include My New Partner (2008), Running Turtle (2009), and Will It Snow for Christmas? (2009).

== Filmography ==
=== Film ===
Year	Title	Role	Notes
2003	My Wife Is a Gangster 2	Chinese mafia member	
2006	My Scary Girl	Jung-hwa	
2007	Off Road	Ji-soo	
2008	While You Were Sleeping	Wife	short film
2008	The Little Prince	Woman at the hangar (cameo)	
2008	A Man Who Was Superman	Writer Kim	
2008	My New Partner	Yoo-ri	
2008	A Boy Who Is Walking in the Sky	Maria	
2009	Running Turtle	Kyeong-joo	
2009	Jeon Woo-chi: The Taoist Wizard	Female doctor/Goblin	
2011	Battlefield Heroes	Gap-sun	
2012	Super Star	Herself (cameo)	
2012	Modern Family	Kim In-ah	segment: "E.D. 571"
2014	Innocent Thing	Seo-yeon	
2016	The Legend of a Mermaid		

=== Television series ===
Year	Title	Role
2004	Forbidden Love	Warrior bodyguard
2009	Queen of Housewives	Eun So-hyun
2009	Will It Snow for Christmas?	Lee Woo-jung
2010	KBS Drama Special: "The Woman Next Door"	Mi-joo
2011	Detectives in Trouble	Jin Mi-sook
2013	A Hundred Year Legacy	Uhm Ki-ok
2018	Risky Romance	

=== Variety show ===
Year	Title
2009	It City: Sunwoo Sun's Mariana - Something New
2010	It Travel: Sunwoo Sun in Guam and Rota
2010–2011	The Secret Manual of Money
2015	Some Guys, Some Girls

=== Music video appearances ===
Year	Song title	Artist
2006	"I Miss You"	F&F
2007	"If It Were a Dream"	Danny Ahn
2009	"30 Minutes Ago"	Lee Hyun
2009	"Salt Under the Tip of Your Nose"	M to M
2010	"It Hurts Because It's Love"	Min Kyung-hoon

== Discography ==
=== Singles ===
Year	Song title	Notes
2009	"Come Now... (Before It's Too Late)"	Track from Love Tonic: Muto Series Vol. 1

== Awards and nominations ==
Year	Award	Category	Nominated work	Result
2004	1st Cine Star Auditions	First Place	—N/a	Won
2009	46th Grand Bell Awards	Best New Actress	Running Turtle	Nominated
2009	30th Blue Dragon Film Awards	Best New Actress	Running Turtle	Nominated
2009	MBC Drama Awards	Best New Actress	Queen of Housewives	Nominated
2009	MBC Drama Awards	Best Couple Award with Yoon Sang-hyun	Queen of Housewives	Nominated
2010	46th Baeksang Arts Awards	Best New Actress – Film	Jeon Woo-chi: The Taoist Wizard	Nominated
