= Thirst (2009 film) =

2009 South Korean horror film by Park Chan-Wook

- Theatrical release poster
- Hangul: 박쥐
- RR: Bakjwi
- MR: Pakchwi
- Directed by: Park Chan-wook
- Screenplay by: Park Chan-wook; Jeong Seo-kyeong
- Based on: Thérèse Raquin by Émile Zola
- Produced by: Park Chan-wook; Ahn Soo-hyun
- Starring: Song Kang-ho; Kim Ok-vin
- Cinematography: Chung Chung-hoon
- Edited by: Kim Sang-bum; Kim Jae-bum
- Music by: Jo Yeong-wook
- Production company: Moho Films
- Distributed by: Focus Features (United States); CJ Entertainment (South Korea)
- Release date: 30 April 2009
- Running time: 134 minutes
- Countries: South Korea; United States
- Languages: Korean; English
- Budget: $5 million
- Box office: $13.5 million

Thirst (Korean: 박쥐; RR: Bakjwi; lit. 'Bat') is a 2009 horror film written, produced and directed by Park Chan-wook. Based on the 1867 novel Thérèse Raquin by Émile Zola, the film stars Song Kang-ho as Sang-hyun, a Catholic priest who turns into a vampire as a result of a failed medical experiment, and falls in love with Tae-ju (Kim Ok-vin), the wife of his childhood friend (Shin Ha-kyun).

An international co-production of South Korea and the United States, Thirst was released in South Korea on 30 April 2009, where it was a commercial success. It received generally positive reviews from critics and won the Jury Prize at the 2009 Cannes Film Festival, where it was also nominated for the Palme d'Or.

== Plot ==
Catholic priest Sang-hyun volunteers at a hospital, providing ministry to the patients. He eventually volunteers to participate in an experiment to find a vaccine for the deadly Emmanuel Virus (EV). The experiment fails, and Sang-hyun is infected with EV, but makes a complete and rapid recovery after receiving a blood transfusion.

News of his recovery spreads among the parishioners of Sang-hyun's congregation, and they begin to believe that he has a gift for healing. Soon, thousands flock to Sang-hyun's services. Among the new churchgoers are Kang-woo, Sang-hyun's childhood friend, and his family. Kang-woo eventually invites Sang-hyun to join the weekly mahjong night at his house. There, Sang-hyun finds himself attracted to Kang-woo's wife, Tae-ju. Sang-hyun later relapses into his illness and wakes in need of shelter from the sunlight, having become a vampire.

Sang-hyun soon finds himself drinking blood from a comatose patient. Aghast, Sang-hyun attempts to commit suicide, but finds himself irresistibly drawn to human blood. EV's symptoms return and only seem to go away when he drinks blood. Trying to avoid committing a murder, Sang-hyun resorts to stealing blood transfusion packs from the hospital.

Tae-ju, who lives with her ill husband and overprotective mother-in-law Mrs. Ra, eventually begins an affair with Sang-hyun. However, when she discovers the truth about Sang-hyun, she retreats in fear. When Sang-hyun pleads with her to run away with him, she turns him down, suggesting that they kill Kang-woo instead.

When Sang-hyun's superior at the monastery requests vampire blood so that his eyes may heal and he may see the world before dying, a disgusted Sang-hyun flees from the monastery. He moves into Mrs. Ra's house so that he may secretly have sex with Tae-ju. Sang-hyun notices bruises on Tae-ju and assumes that Kang-woo is the cause, a suspicion that she confirms. Sang-hyun decides to kill Kang-woo during a fishing trip with the couple. He pulls Kang-woo into the water and claims to his superior that he placed the body inside a cabinet in a house at the bottom of the lake, putting a rock on the body to keep it from floating to the surface. When Sang-hyun's symptoms return, he kills his superior and drinks his blood.

A police investigation ensues. Mrs. Ra drinks often after Kang-woo's death, sinking into a completely paralyzed state. Sang-hyun and Tae-ju are haunted by visions of Kang-woo's corpse. When Tae-ju lets slip that Kang-woo never abused her, Sang-hyun is enraged because he only killed Kang-woo to protect her. Distraught, she asks Sang-hyun to kill her and let her return to Kang-woo. Sang-hyun kills her, but after feeding on her blood, decides that he does not want to be alone forever and feeds her corpse his own blood. She awakens as a vampire. Mrs. Ra, knocked to the floor by a seizure, witnesses everything.

Tae-ju soon starts killing indiscriminately to feed, while Sang-hyun acts more conservatively, only killing when necessary. Their conflicting ethics result in a chase across the rooftops and a battle. Mrs. Ra eventually manages to communicate to Kang-woo's friends that Sang-hyun and Tae-ju killed her son. Tae-ju kills two of the friends, and Sang-hyun appears to eliminate a third one. Realizing the gravity of the situation, Sang-hyun tells Tae-ju that they must flee or be caught. Sang-hyun then places Mrs. Ra in his car and drives into the night with Tae-ju. Before leaving town, he makes a visit to the camp of people who worship him. He makes it seem like he tried to rape a girl, leading the campers to chase him away, no longer idolizing him.

At the house, the third friend escapes; whom Sang-hyun only pretended to kill to protect her from Tae-ju. Meanwhile, Sang-hyun drives to a desolate field with no cover from the imminent dawn. Realizing his plan to have them both burn when dawn breaks, Tae-ju tries to hide but Sang-hyun foils her every attempt. Resigning herself to her fate, she joins him on the car hood, and both are burnt to ash by the sun, as Mrs. Ra watches from the backseat of the car.

== Cast ==
- Song Kang-ho as Fr. Sang-hyun, a Catholic priest, who volunteers to be a patient of the "Emmanuel Virus," becoming a vampire after receiving blood from an unknown origin. He then struggles to deal with his newfound lust for blood.
- Kim Ok-vin as Tae-ju, a young wife of Sang-hyun's childhood friend, fed up with her mundane life while Sang-hyun develops a new love for her.
- Kim Hae-sook as Mrs. Ra, the overly protective mother of Kang-woo.
- Shin Ha-kyun as Kang-woo, Sang-hyun's sick childhood friend and Tae-ju's husband, whom he annoys and abuses according to her.
- Park In-hwan as Fr. Roh, a blind priest superior to Sang-hyun, who wishes to see again.
- Song Young-chang as Seung-dae, a retired cop and Kang-woo's friend.
- Oh Dal-su as Young-du, another one of Kang-woo's friends.
- Ra Mi-ran as Nurse Yu
- Eriq Ebouaney as Emmanuel Research Director
- Hwang Woo-seul-hye as Whistle Girl
- Mercedes Cabral as Evelyn, Young-du's Filipino girlfriend.

== Production ==
"This film was originally called The Bat to convey a sense of horror—after all, it is about vampires. But it is also more than that. It is about passion and a love triangle. I feel that it is unique because it is not just a thriller, and not merely a horror film, but an illicit love story as well."

— writer-director Park Chan-wook on Thirst.

Thirst had been in the works for a number of years prior to the film's shooting and release. As early as Joint Security Area, director Park Chan-wook had asked Song Kang-ho to star in a vampire film Park was developing. Park further developed the film's story with co-writer Chung Seo-kyung while the two collaborated on Lady Vengeance and I'm a Cyborg, But That's OK.

Once greenlit, Thirst became the first Korean feature made with both Korean and U.S. studio funding and distribution, with CJ Entertainment and Focus Features partnering on the film's production. The film is also the first mainstream Korean film to feature full-frontal adult male nudity.

== Reception ==
Thirst received positive reviews from critics on its original release; review aggregator website Rotten Tomatoes reports an approval rating of 81% based on reviews from 119 critics. The site's critics consensus reads, "The stylish Thirst packs plenty of bloody thrills to satisfy fans of both vampire films and director Chan Wook Park." At Metacritic, which assigns a normalized rating out of 100 to reviews from mainstream critics, the film has received an average score of 73 based on 21 reviews, indicating "generally favorable reviews".

Film critic Roger Ebert awarded Thirst three out of a possible four stars, citing that the director was "today's most successful director of horror films". IGN's Joe Utichi awarded the film three-and-a-half out of five stars and said "Thirst may not be the greatest vampire movie ever made, but Park's willingness to try something different makes it a decidedly fresh take on the genre."

=== Box office ===
On 3 May, Thirst debuted at #1 at the South Korean Box office and grossed ₩1,174,224,500 the first day and ₩4,369,977,022 for that three-day weekend. More than 2,223,429 tickets were sold nationwide becoming the 9th most attended film of 2009.

=== Accolades ===
Award	Year	Category	Recipient(s)	Result	Ref.
Cannes Film Festival	2009	Jury Prize	Thirst	Won	
Cannes Film Festival	2009	Palme d'Or	Thirst	Nominated	
Chunsa Film Art Awards	2009	Best Director	Park Chan-wook	Won	
Chunsa Film Art Awards	2009	Best Actor	Song Kang-ho	Won	
Chunsa Film Art Awards	2009	Best Supporting Actress	Kim Hae-sook	Won	
Chunsa Film Art Awards	2009	Best Lighting	Park Hyun-won	Won	
Grand Bell Awards	2009	Best Lighting	Park Hyun-won	Won	
Grand Bell Awards	2009	Best Supporting Actress	Kim Hae-sook	Nominated	
Blue Dragon Film Awards	2009	Best Supporting Actress	Kim Hae-sook	Won	
Blue Dragon Film Awards	2009	Best Music	Jo Yeong-wook	Won	
Blue Dragon Film Awards	2009	Best Film	Thirst	Nominated	
Blue Dragon Film Awards	2009	Best Director	Park Chan-wook	Nominated	
Blue Dragon Film Awards	2009	Best Actor	Song Kang-ho	Nominated	
Blue Dragon Film Awards	2009	Best Actress	Kim Ok-vin	Nominated	
Blue Dragon Film Awards	2009	Best Supporting Actor	Shin Ha-kyun	Nominated	
Blue Dragon Film Awards	2009	Best Cinematography	Chung Chung-hoon	Nominated	
Blue Dragon Film Awards	2009	Best Art Direction	Ryu Seong-hui	Nominated	
Blue Dragon Film Awards	2009	Best Lighting	Park Hyun-won	Nominated	
Director's Cut Awards	2009	Best Director	Park Chan-wook	Won	
Director's Cut Awards	2009	Best Actor	Song Kang-ho	Won	
Asian Film Awards	2010	Best Visual Effects	Lee Seon-hyeong	Won	
Asian Film Awards	2010	Best Actor	Song Kang-ho	Nominated	
Asian Film Awards	2010	Best Cinematography	Chung Chung-hoon	Nominated	
Baeksang Arts Awards	2010	Best Film	Thirst	Nominated	
Baeksang Arts Awards	2010	Best Actress	Kim Ok-vin	Nominated	

== Home media ==
Universal Studios Home Entertainment released a region 1 DVD of Thirst on 17 November 2009. No extras are included, but the film was produced in anamorphic widescreen with Korean DD5.1 Surround audio and subtitles in English, English SDH, French and Spanish. The director's cut, running 148 minutes, has been so far released in Korea only, on DVD and Blu-ray Disc.

== See also ==
- List of South Korean films of 2009
- Nudity in film (East Asian cinema since 1929)
