= Castaway on the Moon =

- Theatrical release poster
- Hangul: 김씨 표류기
- Hanja: 金氏漂流記
- RR: Gimssi pyoryugi
- MR: Kimssi p'yoryugi
- Directed by: Lee Hae-jun
- Written by: Lee Hae-jun
- Produced by: Kim Moo-ryoung; Kang Woo-suk
- Starring: Jung Jae-young; Jung Ryeo-won
- Cinematography: Kim Byeong-seo
- Edited by: Nam Na-yeong
- Music by: Kim Hong-jib
- Production companies: banzakbanzak Film Production; Cinema Service
- Distributed by: CJ Entertainment
- Release date: May 14, 2009
- Running time: 116 minutes
- Country: South Korea
- Language: Korean
- Budget: US$5 million
- Box office: US$3.7 million

Castaway on the Moon (Korean: 김씨 표류기; lit. 'Kim's drifting experience') is a 2009 South Korean romantic comedy-drama film written and directed by Lee Hae-jun. It is a love story between a suicidal man turned castaway on Bamseom in the Han River and a Hikikomori woman who is addicted to Cyworld.

== Plot ==
Kim Seong-geun (Jung Jae-young) is deep in debt and his life seems completely hopeless. He jumps off a bridge into the Han River and washes up on the shore of Bamseom, which lies directly below the bridge. After searching the island he finds it is filled mostly with vegetation and surrounded by the city, but too far to shout and he can't swim. He finds a duck-shaped paddle boat and begins to like living on the island—free of his debt and worries of city life—though it is not easy.

As he learns to survive on the island, his cry for help scrawled in the sand is seen by Kim Jung-yeon (Jung Ryeo-won), a hikikomori who spots him while engaging in her nightly habit of photographing the moon. They soon begin exchanging messages, with Jung-yeon venturing out of her house at night to throw bottled messages onto the island, and Seong-geun writing his replies in the sand. Seong-geun also manages to cultivate crops to prepare noodles for an instant noodles packet of jajangmyeon.

A torrential storm arrives, destroying Seong-geun's farm and sweeping away the possessions he has collected. He is found by a group of workers sent to clean up litter on the island and forced off. Seong-geun boards a bus in the city to jump off the 63 Building. After overcoming her anxiety and desperately running across the bridge to find Seong-geun, Jung-yeon manages to catch up to his bus after the civil defense drill stalls it. She boards and introduces herself to him.

== Cast ==
- Jung Jae-young as Kim Seong-geun
- Jung Ryeo-won as Kim Jung-yeon
- Park Young-seo as delivery man
- Yang Mi-kyung as Jung-yeon's mother
- Koo Kyo-hwan as utilities man #1
- Lee Sang-il as utilities man #2
- Min Kyeong-jin as apartment security guard
- Jang Nam-yeol as bus driver
- Lee Sang-hun as Seong-geun's father
- Jang So-yeon as Seong-geun's girlfriend

== Production ==
=== Development ===
Actor Jung Jae-young suggested the director, Lee Hae-jun, to change the name of the film to "the drifting experience of the Jungs" (정씨표류기) to reference the fact that the actor and actress playing the lead roles are part of the Jung family, but the director insisted on keeping the name since he deliberately chose the family name Kim to suggest the universal nature of the characters. (Note: The decision is influenced by the fact that the Kim family is the most common family name in korea.)

The two Kims in the film communicate with English since Lee wanted to reflect that they are different from the mainstream society that they are part of which use Korean and the isolates would have their own symbols rather than language.

=== Casting and filming ===
Actress Jung Ryeo-won said the favorite parts of the scenario were her character's scar on her forehead since she thought she would never do such makeup ever again on her career and the theme of hope. She also addressed the challenges while playing her character in the film because she felt lonely while filming most of her scenes alone. Actor Jung Jae-young had to lose 7 kg for three months and did not trim his fingernails and toe nails and cut his hair to portray the look of a person who drifted to an uninhabited island. They could only film the beach scenes in Bamseom since it was a nature reserve, so the forest scenes were filmed in Chungju and Changwon. The film was the first to film in Bamseom and the filming was specially authorized by the Seoul authorities.

== Props ==
The character Kim Seong-geun was originally going to wear a triangle underwear but was changed to square underwear because Jung Jae-young resisted to wear it.

== Marketing ==
Jung Jae-young had a jajangmyeon party with movie audiences on May 27, 2009 at the 63 Building.

== Accolades ==
Year	Award	Category	Recipient	Result
2009	29th Hawaii International Film Festival	NETPAC Award	Castaway on the Moon	Won
2009	46th Grand Bell Awards	Best Screenplay	Lee Hae-jun	Nominated
2009	46th Grand Bell Awards	Best Planning	Kim Moo-ryoung	Nominated
2009	32nd Golden Cinematography Awards	Best Actor	Jung Jae-young	Won
2009	30th Blue Dragon Film Awards	Best Screenplay	Lee Hae-jun	Nominated
2010	46th Baeksang Arts Awards	Best Actor	Jung Jae-young	Nominated
2010	46th Baeksang Arts Awards	Best Screenplay	Lee Hae-jun	Nominated
2010	12th Udine Far East Film Festival	Black Dragon Audience Award	Castaway on the Moon	Won
2010	9th New York Asian Film Festival	Audience Award	Castaway on the Moon	Won
2010	14th Fantasia International Film Festival	Special Jury Prize	Castaway on the Moon	Won
2010	14th Fantasia International Film Festival	Audience Award - Best Asian Film, Bronze	Castaway on the Moon	Won

== Remake ==
In 2011, CJ Entertainment announced an American remake, with Mark Waters attached as director and Michael Goldbach as screenwriter.
