= A Frozen Flower =

- Theatrical poster
- Hangul: 쌍화점
- Hanja: 霜花店
- RR: Ssanghwajeom
- MR: Ssanghwajŏm
- Directed by: Yoo Ha
- Written by: Yoo Ha
- Produced by: Lee Tae-heon
- Starring: Zo In-sung; Joo Jin-mo; Song Ji-hyo
- Cinematography: Choi Hyun-ki
- Edited by: Park Gok-ji
- Music by: Kim Jun-seok
- Production companies: United Pictures; Opus Pictures; Sponge Entertainment
- Distributed by: Showbox
- Release date: December 30, 2008
- Running time: 132 minutes
- Country: South Korea
- Languages: Korean; Mongol
- Budget: US$10 million
- Box office: US$18,980,564

A Frozen Flower (Korean: 쌍화점; RR: Ssanghwajeom) is a 2008 South Korean historical erotic thriller film. It is directed by Yoo Ha and stars Zo In-sung, Joo Jin-mo and Song Ji-hyo. The historical film is set during the Goryeo Dynasty and is loosely based on the reign of Gongmin of Goryeo (1330–1374), but it does not strictly comply with historical facts. The controversial story is about the characters' violation of royal family protocol and their pursuit of love.

It was released in South Korea on December 30, 2008, and was the 6th most attended film of 2008 with 3,772,976 tickets sold.

== Plot ==
The King (Joo Jin-mo) of Goryeo is married to a Yuan Dynasty princess (Song Ji-hyo), but they do not have any children. There is constant pressure on the King both from the Yuan emperor and his own counselors to produce a crown prince and ensure the continuity of the royal dynasty. The King's palace guard is composed of thirty six young soldiers, led by military commander Hong-rim (Zo In-sung), who is also the King's lover. The King finally decides to charge Hong-rim with a strange commission: penetrate the Queen to impregnate her. Hong-rim and the Queen are uncomfortable accepting the royal order, but they finally comply. However, their relationship does not stop at procreation, but an intense romance soon blossoms between the two, and in this strong intimate relationship there is no place for the King.

The two passionate lovers surpass their "official mission" and continue to meet each other at midnight in the library in secret. The King begins to suspect Hong-rim's infidelity and soon gains evidence through his junior commander. To punish them and to also gauge the depth of Hong-rim's affection for the Queen, the King calls the two together to his chamber. The king tells them that he has decided that the Queen will continue to try and beget an heir, but only with another subordinate. The King remains firm in his decision, despite entreaties from both the Queen and Hong-rim.

In despair, the Queen attempts to kill herself by slitting her wrists, but fails. In a last-ditch effort to change the King's mind, Hong-rim asks the Queen to stay away from him, and goes to the King to offer his own life in exchange for forgiveness. The King pardons him, believing Hong-rim's claim that his involvement with the Queen was purely lust. He decides to overlook everything that had happened, and instead orders Hong-rim to go away for a while to clear his mind and settle his emotions.

The night before Hong-rim's departure, the Queen's personal maid secretly informs him that the Queen wishes to meet him one last time. She also bears news that the Queen has finally conceived a child. Hong-rim sneaks out from the King's bedside to meet the Queen in the library. They end up having passionate sex in the library, but the King realizes what is happening and catches them in flagrante delicto. When the two lovers attempt to save each other by begging the King to kill them and not the other, the King realizes how strong their romantic love for each other is. In a jealous rage, he has Hong-rim castrated and sent to prison.

The Queen now realizes that the King will eliminate everyone who knows their secret, so she sends her maid to warn Hong-rim's loyal subordinates, and they manage to free Hong-rim from prison and flee the city with him.

Upon learning of the escape, the King demands to know Hong-rim's whereabouts from the Queen, but she refuses to answer. In response, he kills her maid. The King is then informed that the Queen is pregnant, and as the Queen had predicted, he then orders the execution of everyone who knows that he is not the child's father. Only his junior commander, who took over from Hong-rim, is spared.

Some time later, and having recovered from his wound, Hong-rim realizes that the Queen is still in the palace and not on the run, as his subordinates were ordered to tell him. Furious, he starts out for the city on horseback, despite their protests, but then he stops in his journey, realizing how futile it would be. However, on returning to the refuge, he finds that his men have been tracked down and captured.

At the palace, the King tortures the subordinates to discover the whereabouts of Hong-rim, but they remain silent, so the King has them executed and their heads put up on posts on the palace gates, along with that of the Queen's maid. Her head bears the Queen's necklace, in order to trick Hong-rim into believing the queen is dead and forcing him to return to exact revenge. When Hong-rim returns to the city, he indeed becomes enraged by this sight and determines to kill the King. Disguising himself as a soldier, he enters the palace grounds during the celebrations for the soldier who came back from war and hides out, awaiting his chance to reach the King and kill him.

Meanwhile, as the King returns to his private quarters, he encounters the Queen, but he snubs her, and orders his junior commander to escort her back to her room. As the commander is about to leave the Queen's chamber, she warns him that the King will surely have him killed as soon as the baby is born; she then says that if the commander assassinates the King, and her father takes over the throne, she will guarantee that his life will be spared. The junior commander then calls a meeting of his most trusted subordinates and reveals the truth about the King, the Queen and Hong-rim. However, before they can carry out the Queen's plan, Hong-rim goes into action.

Ignoring the palace guards, who plead with him to leave before he is captured and killed, he fights his way to the King's quarters, cutting down all who oppose him. Reaching the King's chamber, Hong-rim confronts the King and demands that he fight him. An intense duel ensues, during which Hong-rim slashes through the King's favorite painting, which depicts him and Hong-rim hunting together. As the desperate duel continues, the junior commander and his men arrive (their intentions not entirely clear), but the King orders them not to intervene, and the junior commander holds them back and awaits the outcome of the fight. At the climax of the duel, the King manages to break Hong-rim's sword, and stabs him in the shoulder. While Hong-rim is pinned by his sword, the King asks him a last question: whether or not Hong-rim had ever felt love for him. Hong-rim replies, "No". Hearing this, the King is shocked, giving Hong-rim time to throw himself forward on the blade and kill the King with the remaining half of his own sword.

As the King dies, Hong-rim staggers to his feet, pulls the King's sword from his shoulder and charges at the guards, but he is fatally stabbed by the junior commander. Moments later, the Queen arrives at the scene with the guards at her heels, who try to hold her back. Horrified, she tearfully calls out for Hong-rim. As she is taken away by the guards, Hong-rim realizes that the King had not killed her after all. He turns his head from her and dies facing the king, his eyes filled with realization of his test. The junior commander then declares that the King has been killed by an assassin, and he orders his men to quickly remove the bodies, and to tell no one of what has transpired.

The final scenes of the film show a flashback to when the King showed young Hong-rim the view of the city and asked if Hong-rim wished to live with him, to which the young Hong-rim replied "Yes." The film ends on a montage of the King and Hong-rim happily hunting together, referring back to a dream the King once had, as depicted in the King's painting.

== Cast ==
=== Main ===
- Zo In-sung as Hong-rim
  - Yeo Jin-goo as young Hong-rim
- Joo Jin-mo as the King
  - Lee Poong-woon as young King
- Song Ji-hyo as Queen

=== Supporting ===
- Shim Ji-ho as Seung-ki
  - Baek Seung-ho as young Seung-ki
- Lim Ju-hwan as Han-baek
  - Seo Young-joo as young Han-baek
- Yeo Wook-hwan as Im-bo
- Song Joong-ki as No-tak
- Jang Ji-won as Bo-duk
- Kim Choon-ki as Eunuch Hwang
- Lee Jong-goo as Tae-sa
- Kwon Tae-won as Jo Il-moon
- Do Yong-koo as Ki Won-hong
- Ko In-bum as Yeon Ki-mok
- Ham Kun-soo as Yuan Dynasty Four Symbols
- No Min-woo as Min-woo
- Do Ye-sung as Choi-Kwan
- Ham Sung-min as Seong-min
- Park Jong-soo as Eunuch Shin
- Son Jong-hak as 밀사
- Kang Poong as 밀사
- Jo Yong-hyun as a young eunuch
- Kim Pil-joong as a young eunuch
- Jung In-hwa as Court Lady Park
- Park Jong-bo as Lord Chil-Won
- Kim Ki-suk as a young Buddhist monk
- Park Min-kyoo as a young Buddhist monk
- Kim Ki-bang as a shop owner in Byeollak Province
- Lee Se-ryang as a shop owner in Hyangnang
- Lee Ye-na as a Royal consort
- Hong Ka-yeon as a Royal consort
- Min Ji-hyun as a Royal consort
- Lee Jung-joo as a Palace maid who dressed like a man
- Kim Min-ah as one of Queen Hall's Musuri
- Lee Jin-ah as one of Queen Hall's Musuri
- Kim Hee-seon as one of Yeongsu Hall's maid
- Kim Se-hee as one of Yeongsu Hall's maid
- Kim Kyung-hee as a Court Lady
- Choi Seung-hee as a Court Lady
- Choi Seung-il as a Eunuch
- Lee Seon-min as a Eunuch
- Kang Dong-kyoon as a Eunuch
- Cho Jin-woong as Lord Tae Ahn
- Im Hyun-sung

=== Cameo ===
Cast	Character
Kim Hyo-joo	Banquet Dancer
Han Sun-young	Banquet Dancer
Park Sun-young	Banquet Dancer
Choi Yoo-jin	Banquet Dancer
Im Ji-hyun	Banquet Dancer
Im Ji-young	Banquet Dancer
Lee Mi-yun	Banquet Dancer
Kim Se-jung	Banquet Dancer
Kim Ga-eun	Banquet Dancer
Kim Soo-ji	Banquet Dancer
Lee Keum-hee	Banquet Dancer
Yoon Hye-sun	Banquet Dancer
Jung Sung-il	Royal Guard
Lee Suk-woo	Royal Guard
Hyun Woo	Royal Guard
Baek Jae-ho	Royal Guard
Kim Ji-won	Royal Guard
Lee Jae-won	Royal Guard
Hwang Joon-hyuk	Royal Guard
Han Tae-sung	Royal Guard
Min Ji-hyuk	Royal Guard
Ri-Eul	Royal Guard
Park Sung-hoon	Royal Guard
Jung Woo-jin	Royal Guard
Kim Ki-bum	Royal Guard
Dae-Ho	Royal Guard
Kim Hyun-woong	Royal Guard
Kim Sung-joon	Royal Guard
Hong Jong-hyun	Royal Guard
Yoon Ho-kyoo	Royal Guard
Moon Suk-hee	Royal Guard
Jo Sang-min	Royal Guard
Kim Woo-hee	Royal Guard
Jo Kang-hyun	Royal Guard
Kim Tae-soo	Royal Guard
Cha Seung-joon	Royal Guard
Jung Ahn-woo	Young Royal Guard
Jung Kwang-min	Young Royal Guard
Kim Ki-yoon	Young Royal Guard
Kim Kwang-jo	Young Royal Guard
Park Jae-yun	Young Royal Guard
Oh Hyun-seung	Young Royal Guard
Lee Sung-woo	Young Royal Guard
Kim Jung-woo	Young Royal Guard
Baek Sang-heun	Young Royal Guard
Han Seung-bum	Young Royal Guard
Kim Hyun-soo	Young Royal Guard
Seo Young-hyun	Young Royal Guard
Park Ji-min	Young Royal Guard
Park In-kul	Young Royal Guard
Lee Seung-koo	Young Royal Guard
Wang Hyuk-joon	Young Royal Guard
Lee Kun-ho	Young Royal Guard
Han Ji-won	Young Royal Guard
Song Yoon-ho	Young Royal Guard
Yoo Dong-kyoo	Young Royal Guard
Park Yong-kang	Young Royal Guard
Park Sang-min	Young Royal Guard
Im Hyuk-joon	Young Royal Guard
Lee Hee-sung	Young Royal Guard
Lee Hee-chul	Young Royal Guard
Koo Dong-wook	Young Royal Guard
Hwang Bi-hong	Young Royal Guard
Yoo Jung-yun	Young Royal Guard
Lee Joo-hoon	Young Royal Guard
Ha Dong-hyun	Young Royal Guard

== Production ==
According to historical records, after the death of his Mongolian-born queen, Princess Noguk, King Gongmin descended into a life of homosexual debauchery, hiring a team of handsome male bodyguards of noble birth to serve in the palace in 1372. When one of the bodyguards made King Gongmin's second wife pregnant, Gongmin tried to kill him to quell the scandal, but was killed by the bodyguard's friends instead. But some historians disagree with this account, insisting that Gongmin was slandered in an attempt to justify the founding of the Joseon Dynasty, and that the youths were just bodyguards.

A Frozen Flower takes its title from a song of that era which described the sexual relationships between Hong-rim and the Queen. It is the fifth feature film by director Yoo Ha, who wanted to make a change from his previous works by doing a historical film, saying, "I always felt uncomfortable with the genre but I felt I should try to overcome those feelings. It is also a new challenge for me to focus on a melodrama." He also stated that the film was "a love story between men."

Zo In-sung was on board from the beginning of the project, and turned down other acting roles to make A Frozen Flower his last work before enlisting for military service. He chose to appear in the film without knowing the exact details, having faith in the director following their earlier collaboration in 2005 on A Dirty Carnival. Jo began training for the role in August 2007, learning martial arts, fencing, horse riding and geomungo. The casting of Joo Jin-mo as the king was announced in December 2007.

The budget for A Frozen Flower was $10 million, and the film went into production on April 16, 2008. It was the first film to shoot at the newly built Jeonju Cinema Studio.

== Awards and nominations ==
2009 Baeksang Arts Awards

- Best Actor - Joo Jin-mo
- Nomination - Most Popular Actress (Film) - Song Ji-hyo
- Nomination - Best Film

2009 Grand Bell Awards

- Best Art Direction - Kim Ki-chul
- Best Music - Kim Jun-seok
- Nomination - Best Lighting - Yoon Ji-won
- Nomination - Best Costume Design - Lee Hye-soon, Jeong Jeong-eun

2009 Blue Dragon Film Awards

- Nomination - Best Cinematography - Choi Hyun-ki
- Nomination - Best Art Direction - Kim Ki-chul
- Nomination - Best Lighting - Yoon Ji-won
- Nomination - Technical Award - Lee Hye-soon, Jeong Jeong-eun (Costume Design)

2010 Fantasporto

- Orient Express Section Special Jury Award - Yoo Ha

== International ==
The rights of the film were sold to Japan, Germany, Belgium, the Netherlands and Luxembourg before it was completed, and also a further seven countries at the European Film Market.

== See also ==
- List of Korean-language films
