= Living Death (film) =

- Theatrical poster
- Hangul: 불신지옥
- Hanja: 不信地獄
- RR: Bulsinjiok
- MR: Pulsinjiok
- Directed by: Lee Yong-ju
- Written by: Lee Yong-ju
- Produced by: Jeong Seung-hye; Lee Jeong-se; Jo Cheol-hyeon
- Starring: Nam Sang-mi; Shim Eun-kyung; Ryu Seung-ryong; Kim Bo-yeon
- Cinematography: Jo Sang-yoon
- Edited by: Kim Sang-bum; Kim Jae-bum
- Music by: Kim Hong-jib
- Production companies: Ahchim Production; DCG Plus
- Distributed by: Showbox
- Release date: August 12, 2009 (South Korea)
- Running time: 106 minutes
- Country: South Korea
- Language: Korean
- Box office: US$1,361,570

Living Death (Korean: 불신지옥; lit. 'Distrust Hell', also known as Possessed) is a 2009 South Korean horror film written and directed by Lee Yong-ju. The film received 248,503 admissions in South Korea.

== Plot ==
A college student named Hee-jin (Nam Sang-mi) returns home when her 14-year-old sister So-jin (Shim Eun-kyung) goes missing. Her mother (Kim Bo-yeon), a fanatic churchgoer, resorts to prayer and refuses to work with the lazy police to find So-jin. Meanwhile, a neighbor commits suicide and leaves a will for So-jin, and Hee-jin hears rumors that her sister had been possessed. The whereabouts of So-jin become increasingly elusive and the dead neighbor begins appearing in Hee-jin's dreams.

== Cast ==
- Nam Sang-mi as Hee-jin
- Shim Eun-kyung as So-jin
- Ryu Seung-ryong as Detective Tae-hwan
- Kim Bo-yeon as Mother
- Jang Young-nam as Su-kyeong
- Moon Hee-kyung as Kyeong-ja
- Shin Eun-jung as Tae-hwan's wife
- Kim You-jung as Tae-hwan's daughter Ji-eun
- Oh Ji-eun as Jeong-mi
- Kim Do-yeon as Locked up woman
- Lee Chang-jik

== Production ==
The early working title for the film was Bi-myeong ("Scream"). It was shown during the 2010 Tribeca Film Festival.

== Awards and nominations ==
Year	Award	Category	Recipient	Result
2009	10th Busan Film Critics Awards	Best New Director	Lee Yong-ju	Won
2009	46th Grand Bell Awards	Best Supporting Actress	Kim Bo-yeon	Nominated
2009	46th Grand Bell Awards	Best Screenplay	Lee Yong-ju	Nominated
2009	30th Blue Dragon Film Awards	Best Supporting Actress	Kim Bo-yeon	Nominated
2009	30th Blue Dragon Film Awards	Best New Director	Lee Yong-ju	Nominated
2009	30th Blue Dragon Film Awards	Best Screenplay	Lee Yong-ju	Won
2010	46th Baeksang Arts Awards	Best Screenplay	Lee Yong-ju	Nominated
