= The Sword with No Name =

2009 South Korean historical film

- Theatrical poster
- Hangul: 불꽃처럼 나비처럼
- RR: Bulkkotcheoreom nabicheoreom
- MR: Pulkkotch'ŏrŏm nabich'ŏrŏm
- Directed by: Kim Yong-gyun
- Written by: Lee Suk-yeon
- Based on: Like Fireworks, Like Butterflies by Yasulok
- Produced by: Yun Sang-oh; Kim Mi-hee; Park Min-hee
- Starring: Cho Seung-woo; Soo Ae
- Cinematography: Kim Myeong-joon
- Edited by: Kim Sang-bum; Kim Jae-bum
- Music by: Choi Yong-rak
- Production company: Sidus Pictures
- Distributed by: Showbox
- Release date: September 24, 2009
- Running time: 124 minutes
- Country: South Korea
- Language: Korean
- Box office: US$10,928,195

The Sword with No Name (Korean: 불꽃처럼 나비처럼; RR: Bulkkotcheoreom nabicheoreom; lit. 'Like Fireworks, Like Butterflies') is a 2009 South Korean historical action drama film, starring Cho Seung-woo and Soo Ae. This film is based on a fictionalized account of Empress Myeongseong. The film sold 1,671,387 tickets nationwide.

== Plot ==
Mu-myeong is a bounty hunter during the Joseon period who lives day-to-day by catching fugitives. His life is forever changed when, on one of his missions, he meets a beautiful noblewoman, Min Ja-young, and falls in love with her. Several years pass and Ja-young enters the royal palace to be married to Emperor Gojong as the next queen of Joseon. Lovesick, Mu-myeong joins the royal guard to be near Ja-young, staying loyally by her side as she navigates court politics and rises to the throne to become the Empress Myeongseong.

Myeongseong tries to modernize the dynasty by breaking it off from its hermit kingdom past while avoiding being colonized by Russia and Japan. She becomes embroiled in a political power struggle with the court's conservative Confucian faction, led by her own father-in-law, the regent Daewongun. As threats against the queen grow, Mu-myeong tries to protect her by fending off assassination attempts from foreign and domestic enemies.

== Cast ==
- Cho Seung-woo as Mu-myeong (literally "Nameless")
- Soo Ae as Min Ja-young, later Empress Myeongseong
- Chun Ho-jin as Daewongun, Gojong's father
- Choi Jae-woong as Noe-jeon
- Kim Young-min as Emperor Gojong
- Park Min-hee as Mi Woo-ra
- Go Soo-hee as So-hee
- Song Hee-yeon as Dae-doo
- Lee Yong-nyeo as Court lady Choi
- Yoon Young-bae as Min Young-ik
- Bong Man-dae as Lee Saeng-won/Ji Kyeong-chool
- Lee Joo-sil as Ja-young's mother
- Kim So-hee as Mu-myeong's mother
- Lee Joon-myeong as young Mu-myeong
- Shin Cheol-jin as Go Jong's eunuch
- Yeo Moo-young as Prime Minister
- Sophie Broustal as Isabel
- Jung Woon-sun as Ja Young's waiting lady
- Lee Moo-saeng as Noe-jeon's subordinate #2

== Awards and nominations ==
Year	Award	Category	Recipients	Result
2009	30th Blue Dragon Film Awards	Best Art Direction	Min Eon-ok	Nominated
2009	30th Blue Dragon Film Awards	Best New Actor	Choi Jae-woong	Nominated
2009	29th Korean Association of Film Critics Awards	Best New Actor	Choi Jae-woong	Won
2010	4th Asian Film Awards	Best Costume Designer	Shim Hyun-seob	Nominated
2010	Deauville Asian Film Festival	Lotus Action Asia	Kim Yong-gyun	Nominated
