= Wilderness (2017 film) =

- Film poster for Part One
- Directed by: Yoshiyuki Kishi
- Screenplay by: Takehiko Minato; Yoshiyuki Kishi
- Based on: Aa Koya; 1966 novel by Shūji Terayama
- Produced by: Hiromitsu Sugita; Junko Sato; Mitsunobu Kawamura; Ryo Yukizane; Yuko Nakamura; Masahiro Handa
- Starring: Masaki Suda; Yang Ik-june
- Cinematography: Kozo Natsumi
- Production company: TV Man Union
- Release dates: 7 October 2017 (Japan) (Part One); 21 October 2017 (Japan) (Part Two); October 2017 (BIFF)
- Running time: Part One: 157 minutes Part Two: 147 minutes
- Country: Japan
- Language: Japanese

Wilderness: Part One & Part Two (Japanese: あゝ、荒野, Hepburn: Ā, Kōya; lit: "Ah, Wilderness") is a 2017 Japanese two-part drama film based on arthouse screenwriter Shūji Terayama's one and only full length novel, Aa Koya, published in 1966. Directed by Yoshiyuki Kishi, it stars Masaki Suda and Yang Ik-june. It premiered in A Window on Asian Cinema at the 22nd Busan International Film Festival.

== Plot ==
Two "losers" meet by chance when they decide to join a rundown boxing gym by half-blind trainer Horiguchi (Yūsuke Santamaria). Ex-convict Shinji (Masaki Suda), whose father's suicide death impacts his mental health and outward aggressiveness, has just been released from a juvenile detention centre and is out to take revenge on Yuji Yamamoto (Yūki Yamada) who betrayed him and has since become a boxer. Kenji (Yang Ik-june), a mild-mannered half-Korean-half-Japanese barber, is extremely shy and stutters due to a traumatic past with his abusive father. They form an unlikely friendship as they journey their way to become professional boxers and a way back into an unforgiving society.

== Cast ==
- Masaki Suda as Shinji Sawamura
- Yang Ik-june as Kenji
- Yūsuke Santamaria as Horiguchi
- Yūki Yamada as Yuji Yamamoto
- Akari Kinoshita as Yoshiko Sone
- Anna Konno as Keiko Nishiguchi
- Kou Maehara as Keizo Kawasaki
- Tae Kimura as Kyoko Kimizuka

== Awards and nominations ==
Year	Award	Category	Recipient	Result
2017	60th Blue Ribbon Awards	Best Film	Wilderness	Won
2017	60th Blue Ribbon Awards	Best Actor	Masaki Suda	Nominated
2017	42nd Hochi Film Award	Best Actor	Masaki Suda	Won
2017	30th Nikkan Sports Film Award	Best Actor	Masaki Suda	Won
2018	91st Kinema Junpo Award	Best Actor	Masaki Suda	Won
2018	91st Kinema Junpo Award	Best Supporting Actor	Yang Ik-june	Won
2018	41st Japan Academy Prize	Best Actor	Masaki Suda	Won
2018	12th Asian Film Awards	Best Supporting Actor	Yang Ik-june	Won
2018	72nd Mainichi Film Awards	Best Actor	Masaki Suda	Won
2018	13th Osaka Cinema Festival	Best Actor	Masaki Suda	Won
2018	27th Tokyo Sports Film Award	Best Actor	Masaki Suda	Nominated
