= Tidal Wave (2009 film) =

- Theatrical release poster
- Hangul: 해운대
- Hanja: 海雲臺
- RR: Haeundae
- MR: Haeundae
- Directed by: Yoon Je-kyoon
- Written by: Yoon Je-kyoon; Kim Hwi
- Produced by: Yoon Je-kyoon; Lee Sang-yong; Gil Yeong-min
- Starring: Sul Kyung-gu; Ha Ji-won; Park Joong-hoon; Uhm Jung-hwa
- Cinematography: Kim Young-ho
- Edited by: Shin Min-kyung
- Music by: Lee Byung-woo
- Production companies: Doosaboo Film; CJ Entertainment
- Distributed by: CJ Entertainment
- Release date: 22 July 2009
- Running time: 120 minutes
- Country: South Korea
- Language: Korean
- Budget: US$16 million
- Box office: US$74.4 million

Tidal Wave (Korean: 해운대; RR: Haeundae) is a 2009 South Korean disaster film directed by Yoon Je-kyoon and starring Sul Kyung-gu, Ha Ji-won, Park Joong-hoon and Uhm Jung-hwa. Billed as South Korea's first disaster film, the film released theatrically on 22 July 2009 and received more than 11 million admissions nationwide.

== Plot ==
Man-sik, a local from the Haeundae District of Busan, unexpectedly loses Yeon-hee's father while based on a deep-sea fishing boat in the Indian Ocean during the 2004 tsunami, due to an error in judgement. Because of this, he avoids getting involved with Yeon-hee and his uncle Eok-jo, who was a shipowner for allowing Man-sik and Yeon-hee's father to set sail during the tsunami years prior.

Yeon-hee, who now runs an unlicensed seafood restaurant wants to start a relationship with Man-sik.

Eok-jo, now the head chairman of Busan, is pushing for redevelopment of Haeundae to designate it as a special tourist zone, causing backlash from the locals.

Dong-choon, who is Man-sik's half-brother, teams up with his son, Seung-hyun and get involved in illegal activity to earn money, but are caught by police. Man-sik finally plans to propose to Yeon-hee.

Geologist Kim Hwi runs into his ex-wife Yoo-jin. She has a daughter named Ji-min and a new boyfriend Hae-chan but she and her ex do not tell their daughter that Hwi is her birth father as they are worried about how she might react.

A wealthy college student from Seoul, Hee-mi, accidentally falls into the sea from a yacht. Hyeong-sik, Man-sik's younger brother, is a lifeguard who rescues Hee-mi. Hee-mi is angered by the "violent" rescue and annoys him by following him around, before the two eventually become close.

During the fireworks, Man-sik proposes to Yeon-hee. Yeon-hee says a ribbon hung outside her restaurant the day after means yes. On the day after, Man-sik sees no ribbon and meets Dong-choon, who was nearby. Dong-choon tells Man-sik that he told Yeon-hee why her father died several years ago. Man-sik grows furious, thinking that what Dong-choon told Yeon-hee caused her to snub hanging the ribbon and attacks him. During the fight, they see a flock of birds flying away.

Hwi notices that the Sea of Japan (known as the East Sea in Korea) is displaying similar activity to what was observed in the Indian Ocean five years prior. Despite his warnings, the Disaster Prevention Agency assures him that South Korea is at no risk, but a large megatsunami forms because of a landslide near Japan and starts to travel towards Busan, where millions of beachgoers are vacationing. Calculating the speed of the megatsunami, Hwi concludes that Busan residents have only 10 minutes to escape. A short earthquake (a minor aftershock) hits Busan before the trough of the wave reaches the shore, which causes the sea to start receding from the shore, causing mass hysteria as people notice an upcoming tsunami. Thousands run for their lives before the wave reaches Haeundae and continues into Busan. Dong-choon, Seung-hyun, his grandmother and others on the Gwangan Bridge are swept away by the sea. The height of this bridge is 116 metres (381 ft) tall, with the wave's height reaching around 130 metres (430 ft) tall.

Eok-jo and Dong-choon's mother are in the streets and attempt to escape as they see the wave approaching nearby. The tsunami hits the city, drowning several thousands.

A telephone pole collapses, electrocuting everyone in the water. Yeon-hee escapes, but Man-sik nearly loses his life, until Eok-jo shows up and sacrifices himself to save Man-sik, before being drifted away by the currents. Dong-choon awakens on the bridge, but when he tries and fails to light a cigarette and subsequently discards the lighter out of frustration, it falls into petrol leaking from a tanker, causing an explosion that severs the bridge in half, sending shipping containers flying into buildings on the shore.

Hyeong-sik jumps from a rescue helicopter and saves Hee-mi in the sea. When Hyeong-sik and Joon-ha are together on the rope, Hyeong-sik realizes the rope is about to break, and only one can go up to the helicopter. He cuts the connected rope and falls into the violent sea. The elevator Yoo-jin is trapped in floods with water, and she talks in tears to her daughter Ji-min on her phone. A worker saves Yoo-jin. On the roof, she meets Ji-min and Hwi. The two help their daughter get on a crowded rescue helicopter. Before the helicopter leaves, Hwi reveals to his daughter that he is her biological father. Yoo-jin and Hwi hug each other before another megatsunami kills them, with the same height as the first wave.

After the tsunami, a memorial service honors the thousands who died, including Hyeong-sik, Hwi, Yoo-jin, and Eok-jo. Dong-choon finds out that his mother died and breaks into tears. Many help reconstruct Busan. Man-sik, while cleaning the ruins of Yeon-hee's restaurant, finds the red ribbon, meaning she accepted his proposal. The movie ends with a scene of Haeundae in ruins but in a hopeful atmosphere.

== Cast ==
- Sul Kyung-gu as Man-sik
- Ha Ji-won as Yeon-hee
- Park Joong-hoon as Kim-hwi
- Uhm Jung-hwa as Yoo-jin
- Lee Min-ki as Hyung-sik
- Kang Ye-won as Hi-mi
- Kim In-kwon as Dong-choon
- Song Jae-ho as Eok-jo
- Kim Ji-yeong as Geum-ryeon
- Yeo Ho-min as Joon-ha
- Seong Byeong-suk as Dong-choon's mother
- Chun Bo-geun as Seung-hyun
- Kim You-jung as Ji-min
- Kim Yoo-bin as Jin-soo
- Kim Jeong-woon as Hyeong-cheol
- Son Chae-bin as Eun-so
- Lee Si-on as Gong-joo
- Seong Yoo-kyeong as You-kyung
- Kim In-gyoo as You-kyung's dad
- Hwang In-joon as You-kyung's dad
- Tae In-ho

== Release ==
Distribution rights for Haeundae was sold to Hong Kong, Taiwan, India, Indonesia, Japan, Malaysia, Philippines, Singapore, Thailand, Vietnam, the Czech Republic, Slovakia, Russia, Germany, Hungary, France, Quebec, Brazil, the United Kingdom, Australia and Turkey. The film was released in South Korea on 22 July 2009. As of 20 September 2009, Haeundae had received a total of 11,301,649 admissions in South Korean theatres.

In English-speaking countries, the film was released as Tidal Wave. In the United Kingdom, the DVD was released on October 12, 2009 from Entertainment One.

== Awards and nominations ==
Award ceremony	Category	Recipients	Result
30th Blue Dragon Film Awards	Best Film	Tidal Wave	Nominated
30th Blue Dragon Film Awards	Best Director	Yoon Je-kyoon	Nominated
30th Blue Dragon Film Awards	Best Supporting Actor	Kim In-kwon	Nominated
30th Blue Dragon Film Awards	Best Supporting Actor	Lee Min-ki	Nominated
30th Blue Dragon Film Awards	Best New Actress	Kang Ye-won	Nominated
30th Blue Dragon Film Awards	Best Cinematography	Kim Yeong-ho	Nominated
30th Blue Dragon Film Awards	Technical Award	Hans Uhlig, Jang Seong-ho (CG)	Won
30th Blue Dragon Film Awards	Audience Choice Award for Most Popular Film	Tidal Wave	Won
18th Buil Film Awards	Best Director	Yoon Je-kyoon	Won
18th Buil Film Awards	Best Supporting Actor	Kim In-kwon	Won
12th Director's Cut Awards	Best Producer	Yoon Je-kyoon	Won
46th Grand Bell Awards	Best Film	Tidal Wave	Nominated
46th Grand Bell Awards	Best Director	Yoon Je-kyoon	Nominated
46th Grand Bell Awards	Best Actor	Sol Kyung-gu	Nominated
46th Grand Bell Awards	Best Supporting Actor	Kim In-kwon	Nominated
46th Grand Bell Awards	Best Supporting Actress	Uhm Jung-hwa	Nominated
46th Grand Bell Awards	Best Cinematography	Kim Yeong-ho	Nominated
46th Grand Bell Awards	Best Visual Effects	Hans Uhlig, Jang Seong-ho	Nominated
46th Grand Bell Awards	Best Sound Effects	Eun Hee-soo	Nominated
46th Grand Bell Awards	Best Planning	Yoon Je-kyoon	Won
29th Korean Association of Film Critics Awards	Best Cinematography	Kim Young-ho	Won
2009 Mnet 20's Choice Awards	Female Movie Star	Ha Ji-won	Won
46th Baeksang Arts Awards	Grand Prize	Yoon Je-kyoon	Won
46th Baeksang Arts Awards	Best Film	Tidal Wave	Nominated
46th Baeksang Arts Awards	Best New Actor	Lee Min-ki	Won
46th Baeksang Arts Awards	Best Director	Yoon Je-kyoon	Nominated
