= Closer to Heaven (film) =

- Theatrical release poster
- Hangul: 내 사랑 내 곁에
- RR: Nae sarang nae gyeote
- MR: Nae sarang nae kyŏt'e
- Directed by: Park Jin-pyo
- Written by: Park Jin-pyo
- Produced by: Lee Eugene
- Starring: Kim Myung-min; Ha Ji-won
- Cinematography: Kim Tae-gyeong
- Edited by: Kang Kyeong-hwa
- Music by: Park Ki-heon
- Production company: Zip Cinema
- Distributed by: CJ Entertainment
- Release date: 24 September 2009 (South Korea)
- Running time: 121 minutes
- Country: South Korea
- Language: Korean
- Budget: US$3.3 million
- Box office: US$13.3 million

Closer to Heaven (Korean: 내 사랑 내 곁에; RR: nae sarang nae gyeote; lit. 'My Love by My Side') is a 2009 South Korean romantic drama film written and directed by Park Jin-pyo, starring Kim Myung-min and Ha Ji-won.

== Plot ==
Lee Ji-soo is a twice-divorced funeral director, and no stranger to death or loss. She reunites with old friend Baek Jong-woo when he arranges for funeral services for his deceased mother. Jong-woo has been battling Lou Gehrig's disease since he was a teenager. The two fall in love and get married. As Jong-woo's symptoms continue to worsen and he begins to lose control over his body, he lashes out at Ji-soo. Despite her hurt, all Ji-soo wants is to stay by his side and hope for a cure.

== Cast ==
- Kim Myung-min as Baek Jong-woo
- Ha Ji-won as Lee Ji-soo
- Nam Neung-mi as Joo Ok-yeon
- Im Ha-ryong as Park Geun-sook, Choon-ja's husband
- Choi Jong-ryeol as Ok-yeon's husband
- Shin Shin-ae as Jin Hee Mo (Jin-hee's mother)
- Im Jong-yoon as Bae Seok-joong
- Im Hyung-joon as Bae Seok-won
- Im Seong-min as Choon-ja
- Gain as Seo Jin-hee
- Jang Won-young as Mr. Choi
- Hong Seok-yeon as Elder Son
- Kim Yeo-jin as Professor Son Young-chan
- Kim Kwang-kyu as Kook Dong-sik
- Jung Eui-chul as Yoo Seung-wook
- Son Young-soon as Jong-woo's mother
- Yoo Seung-mok as Ex-husband Kim Eun-ho
- Kim Young-pil as Jong-woo's friend, Wook-joong
- Kim Young-hoon as Jong-woo's friend, Kwan-young
- Choi Yo-han as Jong-woo's friend, Jae-ho
- Jeon Su-ji as Kim Jong-do's wife
- Yoo Ji-yeon as Head nurse
- Kang Shin-il as Lee Hak-cheon, Ji-soo's father (cameo)
- Sul Kyung-gu as Kim Jong-do (cameo)
- Song Young-chang as Therapist (cameo)
- Seo Hyo-rim as Reporter (cameo)

== Release ==
Closer to Heaven was released in South Korean theaters on 24 September 2009, and it topped the box office chart for 3 consecutive weeks. It was the first melodrama to surpass the 2 million admissions mark since Maundy Thursday in 2006. Closer to Heaven received a total of 2,153,068 admissions at the end of its run, making it the 10th highest grossing film of 2009.

== Awards and nominations ==
Year	Award	Category	Recipient	Result
2009	46th Grand Bell Awards	Best Actor	Kim Myung-min	Won
2009	46th Grand Bell Awards	Popularity Award	Kim Myung-min	Won
2009	46th Grand Bell Awards	Best Supporting Actress	Nam Neung-mi	Nominated
2009	30th Blue Dragon Film Awards	Best Leading Actor	Kim Myung-min	Won
2009	30th Blue Dragon Film Awards	Best Leading Actress	Ha Ji-won	Won
2009	30th Blue Dragon Film Awards	Popular Star Award	Ha Ji-won	Won
2009	30th Blue Dragon Film Awards	Best Music	Park Ki-heon	Nominated
2010	46th Baeksang Arts Awards	Best Actress	Ha Ji-won	Won
2010	7th Max Movie Awards	Best Actor	Kim Myung-min	Nominated
