= Lee Ho-jae (director) =

South Korean filmmaker (born 1973)

- Born: January 3, 1973 (age 53); South Korea
- Occupations: Film director, screenwriter

Korean name
- Hangul: 이호재
- RR: I Hojae
- MR: I Hojae

Lee Ho-jae (Korean: 이호재; born January 3, 1973) is a South Korean film director and screenwriter. Lee debuted with the crime thriller The Scam (2009). It won Best New Director at the 46th Grand Bell Awards in 2009 and 46th Baeksang Arts Awards in 2010.

His second feature science fiction drama Robot, Sori (2016) is about a man who tracks down his missing daughter's voice with the help of a robot. As they continue their journey, they form an unforgettable bond.

== Filmography ==
- Forbidden Floor (2006) - screenwriter
- The Scam (2009) - director, screenwriter
- Vertical Limit (short film, 2010) - director, screenwriter, cinematographer, editor
- How to Use Guys with Secret Tips (2013) - script editor
- Robot, Sori (2016) - director, screenwriter

== Awards ==
- 2009 46th Grand Bell Awards: Best New Director (The Scam)
- 2010 46th Baeksang Arts Awards: Best New Director (Film) (The Scam)

=== Honours ===
- Jury member at the 2024 Busan International Film Festival for its main competition section 'DGK PLUS M Award'.
