= Chaw (film) =

- Directed by: Shin Jung-won
- Written by: Alyssa Leib; Shin Jung-won
- Produced by: Park Kyung-duk
- Starring: Uhm Tae-woong; Jung Yu-mi; Jang Hang-sun; Yoon Je-moon; Park Hyuk-kwon
- Cinematography: Kim Yung-chul
- Edited by: Choi Jae-geun
- Music by: Kim Jun-seong
- Production company: Soo Jack Films
- Distributed by: Lotte Entertainment; Finecut
- Release date: July 16, 2009
- Running time: 122 minutes
- Country: South Korea
- Language: Korean
- Budget: US$7 million
- Box office: US$10.8 million

Chaw (Korean: 차우), released in the United States as Chawz, is a 2009 South Korean action-adventure film about a mutant killer pig wreaking havoc on a small mountain town, and the ragtag team of five who set out to stop the beast. The Korean title is pronounced "chow", which means "trap" in Chungcheong dialect.

== Plot ==
The quiet town of Sammaeri near Jirisan has been crime-free for a decade until now. Bodies of villagers begin turning up, making the village leaders nervous just ahead of an organic food fair expected to be a financial windfall. Chun Il-man (Jang Hang-sun), whose granddaughter was one of the victims, is sure that a man-killing boar is behind the crimes. He joins forces with detective Shin (Park Hyuk-kwon) and Kim Kang-soo (Uhm Tae-woong), a reassigned cop from Seoul whose mother has gone missing in the woods. With Byun Soo-ryun (Jung Yu-mi), a biologist studying wild animals, and glory-seeking hunter Baek Man-bae (Yoon Je-moon) on the team to fight the giant killer beast, the five start up the mountain to face their enemy.

== Cast ==
- Uhm Tae-woong as Police officer Kim Kang-soo
- Jung Yu-mi as Byun Soo-ryun
- Jang Hang-sun as Chun Il-man
- Yoon Je-moon as Baek Man-bae
- Park Hyuk-kwon as Detective Shin
- Kim Gi-cheon as Village chief
- Lee Sang-hee as Head of village police
- Go Seo-hee as Deok-gu's "mom"
- Park Hye-jin as Kim's mother
- Heo Yeon-hwa as Mi-young, Kim's wife
- Jung Yoon-min as Officer Park
- Ha Sung-kwang as Soo-ryun's researcher seonbae
- Jo Moon-yi as President Kwak
- Park Chang-ik as Deok-gu
- Kong Ho-seok as Old Man in mountain cabin
- Ha Yoo-yi as Choon-hwa, Il-man's granddaughter
- Moon Jong-hun as Police officer
- Nam Sang-baek as Resident 1
- Jung Jae-sung as Resident 2
- Kwon Bum-taek as Pathologist
- Kwon Oh-jin as Cemetery owner
- Choi Won-young as Prosecutor

== Production ==
Director Shin Jung-won said his film adopted a typical Hollywood B movie monster narrative to tackle environmental issues, particularly the serious destruction inflicted on Korea's ecology. He said Korea had never had a film dealing with real-life killer creatures like Alligator and Anacondas: The Hunt for the Blood Orchid and was "intrigued by the idea of a familiar animal attacking and killing humans and wanted to create something out of this unexpectedness. But most of all, I wanted something funny and unique."

After filming in Seoul, the production crew and the main actors flew to the United States to shoot special effects scenes. The shooting lasted for 40 days in San Francisco. Misunderstandings in interpreting the nuance of a scene or dialogue sometimes arose between the U.S. special effects team and Korean actors due to different cultural backgrounds, but Uhm said, "after the shooting was over, we formed a strong team spirit, as if we battled together in a war."

It took three years and ₩3 billion to design and realize via animatronics, stuntmen with costumes, and CG ― provided by the creative team Polygon Entertainment and Stareast Digital Lab led by Hans Uhlig and Erik Jensen ― a mutated, super-sized pig that develops a taste for human flesh.

== Release ==
Chaw was screened Berlin Film Festival's Film Market, afterwards it was released in 15 countries, including Germany, Switzerland, India, Singapore, Thailand, the United States, and Japan. The film was released in South Korea on July 16, 2009.
