= Goodbye Mom =

- Hangul: 애자
- RR: Aeja
- MR: Aeja
- Directed by: Jeong Gi-hun
- Written by: Jeong Gi-hun
- Produced by: Kim Sang-min
- Starring: Choi Kang-hee; Kim Young-ae
- Cinematography: Park Yong-su
- Edited by: Lee Hyun-mee
- Music by: Kim Joon-seok; Jeong Se-rin
- Production company: Sirius Pictures
- Distributed by: Showbox
- Release date: September 9, 2009
- Running time: 110 minutes
- Country: South Korea
- Language: Korean
- Box office: US$12.6 million

Goodbye Mom (Korean: 애자) is a 2009 South Korean comedy drama film written and directed by Jeong Gi-hun in his feature debut. Starring Choi Kang-hee and Kim Young-ae, it depicts the story of an unsuccessful writer and her tumultuous relationship with her mother. A box office hit with more than 1.9 million admissions, Jeong also won Best Director for Asian New Talent Award at the 2010 Shanghai International Film Festival.

== Cast ==
- Choi Kang-hee as Park Ae-ja
- Kim Young-ae as Choi Young-hee
- Bae Soo-bin as Cheol-min
- Choi Il-hwa as Doctor Dong-pal
- Seong byeong-sook as Fish market lady
- Sa Hyun-jin as Hyun-jin
- Kim Jae-man as Min-seok
  - Baek Seung-hwan as young Min-seok
- Jang Young-nam as Editor
- Jung Hye-sun as Female monk
- Shin Jung-geun as Joon-won
- Oh Yeon-ah as Min-jung

== Awards and nominations ==
Year	Award	Category	Recipient	Result
2009	46th Grand Bell Awards	Best Director	Jeong Gi-hun	Nominated
2009	46th Grand Bell Awards	Best Actress	Choi Kang-hee	Nominated
2009	46th Grand Bell Awards	Best Supporting Actress	Kim Young-ae	Won
2009	46th Grand Bell Awards	Best Screenplay	Jeong Gi-hun	Nominated
2009	30th Blue Dragon Film Awards	Best Actress	Choi Kang-hee	Nominated
2009	30th Blue Dragon Film Awards	Best Supporting Actress	Kim Young-ae	Nominated
2009	30th Blue Dragon Film Awards	Best New Director	Jeong Gi-hun	Nominated
2009	30th Blue Dragon Film Awards	Best Screenplay	Jeong Gi-hun	Nominated
2009	30th Blue Dragon Film Awards	Popular Star Award	Choi Kang-hee	Won
2010	46th Baeksang Arts Awards	Best Actress (Film)	Choi Kang-hee	Nominated
2010	46th Baeksang Arts Awards	Most Popular - Actress (Film)	Choi Kang-hee	Won
2010	46th Baeksang Arts Awards	Best New Director (Film)	Jeong Gi-hun	Nominated
2010	13th Shanghai International Film Festival	Best Director for Asian New Talent Award	Jeong Gi-hun	Won
