= Jeong Gi-hun =

South Korean film director and screenwriter

- Born: 1974 (age 51–52); South Korea
- Education: Paekche Institute of the Arts
- Occupations: Film director screenwriter

Korean name
- Hangul: 정기훈
- RR: Jeong Gihun
- MR: Chŏng Kihun

Jeong Gi-hun (Korean: 정기훈; born 1974) is a South Korean film director and screenwriter. Jeong made his debut with the hit dramedy film Goodbye Mom (2009), which received numerous nominations and awards, including Best Director for Asian New Talent Award at the 2010 Shanghai International Film Festival. His second feature, the romantic drama Love 911 (2012), was also a box office hit.

== Filmography ==
- My Dear Keum-hong (1995) - directing dept
- A Promise (1998) - 1st assistant director
- Wild Card (2003) - 1st assistant director
- Death Bell (2008) - colorist, script editor
- Goodbye Mom (2009) - director, screenwriter
- Love 911 (2012) - director, screenwriter
- You Call It Passion (2015) - director, screenwriter

== Awards ==
- 2010 13th Shanghai International Film Festival: Best Director for Asian New Talent Award (Goodbye Mom)
