= Lee Yong-ju =

South Korean filmmaker (born 1970)

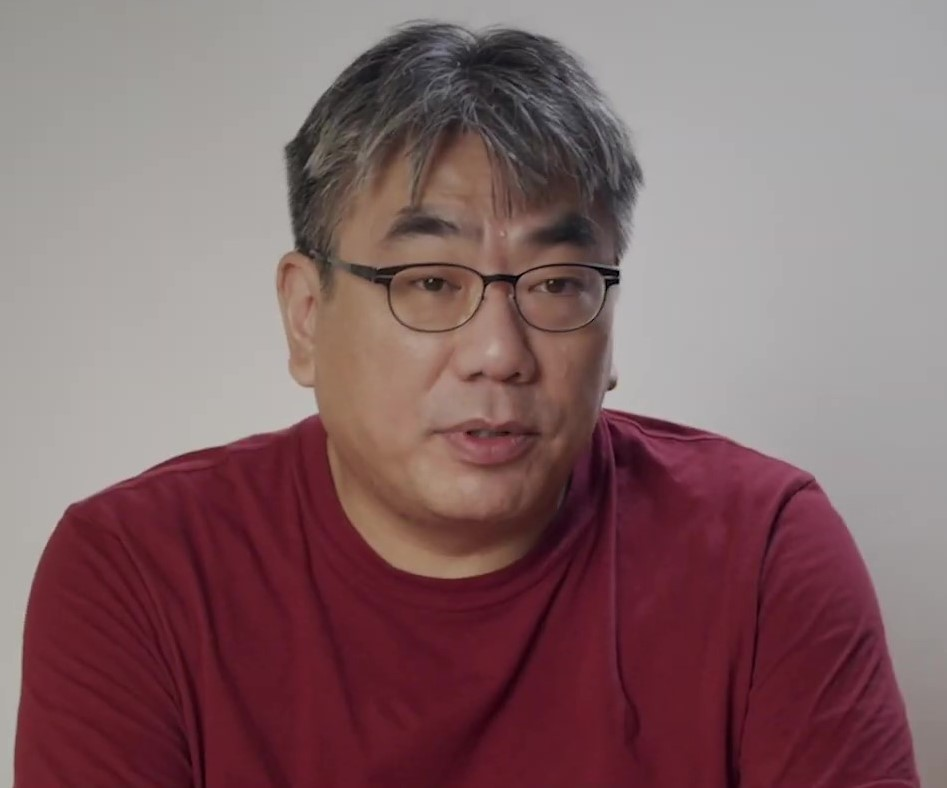
- Born: June 6, 1970 (age 56); Seoul, South Korea
- Education: Yonsei University - Architecture
- Occupations: Film director, screenwriter

Korean name
- Hangul: 이용주
- RR: I Yongju
- MR: I Yongju

Lee Yong-ju (Korean: 이용주; born June 6, 1970) is a South Korean film director and screenwriter.

== Career ==
Lee Yong-joo was born June 6, 1970. He entered the film industry in 2003 as assistant director for the film Memories of Murder. Afterwards, he debuted as a commercial film director with the movie Possessed in 2009. He is well known for the film Architecture 101 (2012).

== Filmography ==
- A.F.R.I.K.A. (2002) - production department
- Memories of Murder (2003) - assistant director
- Spider Forest (2004) - production department, actor
- Feathers in the Wind (2005) - actor
- Holy Daddy (2006) - production department
- The Mafia, the Salesman (2007) - line producer
- Possessed (2009) - director, screenwriter
- Architecture 101 (2012) - director, screenwriter
- The Silenced (2015) - script editor
- The Himalayas (2015) - production department
- Seo Bok (2020) - director

== Awards ==
- 2009 10th Busan Film Critics Awards: Best New Director (Possessed)
- 2009 30th Blue Dragon Film Awards: Best Screenplay (Possessed)
- 2012 12th Buil Film Awards: Best Screenplay (Architecture 101)
