= Yang Ik-june =

South Korean actor and filmmaker (born 1975)

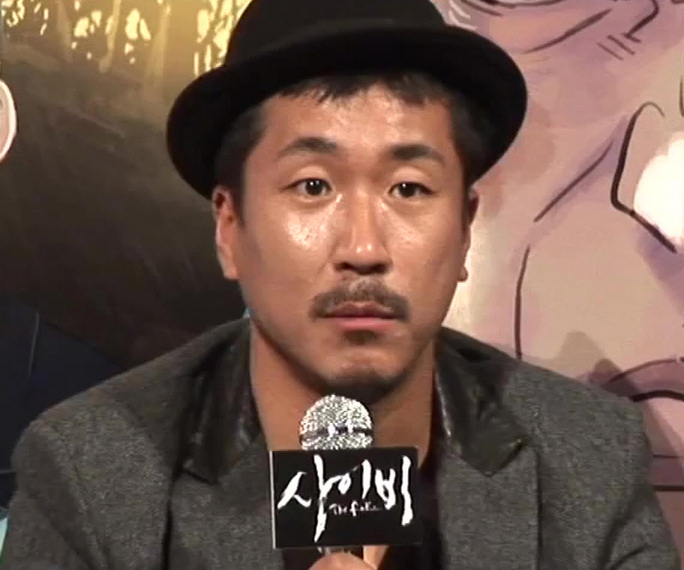
- Yang in 2013
- Born: October 19, 1975 (age 51); Seoul, South Korea
- Other name: Yang Ik-joon
- Occupations: Actor; film director; screenwriter; film editor
- Agent: Prain TPC

Korean name
- Hangul: 양익준
- Hanja: 梁益準
- RR: Yang Ikjun
- MR: Yang Ikchun

Yang Ik-june (born October 19, 1975) is a South Korean actor and film director. He is best known for the 2009 film Breathless, which he wrote, directed, edited, and starred in.

== Career ==
Born in Seoul in 1975, Yang graduated from the Department of Entertainment & Acting at the Kongju Communication Arts College. After discharge from his military service, Yang studied theatre and trained at the Actor's 21 Academy before delving into the film industry. In the next six years he starred in 30 short films, and won the Best Actor award at the Mise-en-scène Short Film Festival for the 2005 short film Ooh, You Make Me Sick. In 2005 he directed his first short film, Always Behind You, which earned him the Audience Award at the Seoul Independent Short Film Festival. He also played minor roles in more than ten mainstream films such as Les Formidables, Maundy Thursday, and Viva! Love.

But it was Breathless, his semi-autobiographical feature directorial debut in which he also played the lead role, that catapulted Yang into star director status. Breathless was selected for the Asian Cinema Fund which provided post-production support, and the low-budget film had its world premiere at the 2008 Busan International Film Festival. It proceeded to receive much critical acclaim, winning 23 prizes in the international film festival circuit including a Tiger Award at Rotterdam. Upon its theater release in Korea, the film performed better than expected at the box office with 130,000 admissions, a rare accomplishment for an independent film.

Yang then starred in a supporting role in the 2010 comedy/road movie Looking for My Wife (also known as Runaway from Home). In 2011, he was a voice actor for The King of Pigs, an adult animated film on violence and bullying. He also directed the short films Departure and Immature that same year. Immature was funded by the Jeonju International Film Festival and released as part of the omnibus A Time to Love. Another short film Shibata & Nagao, a comedy inspired by actor's workshops and co-produced with Japan, won the Best Korean Short Film Award at the Asiana International Short Film Festival in 2012. Yang made his television acting debut in the melodrama The Innocent Man, imbuing his supporting role as a small-time thug with an air of menace. In 2013 he was among four celebrities who directed a short film using smartphone Samsung Galaxy S4 with the theme "Meet a Life Companion"; his short Dance Together focused on a Japanese woman who encounters someone new through a cell phone after experiencing the pain of a parting.

== Filmography ==
Year	Title	Credited as						
Year	Title	Director	Writer	Editor	DP	Sound mixer	Actor	Role
2002	Conduct Zero	No	No	No	No	No	Yes	sesaem trio
2003	Happy Ero Christmas	No	No	No	No	No	Yes	henchman 2
2004	What Are You Doing, Chul-soo	No	No	No	No	No	Yes	Chul-soo
2004	Ain't No Maid (short film)	No	No	No	No	No	Yes	택배기사
2004	Arahan	No	No	No	No	No	Yes	drain pipe worker 2
2005	Ooh, You Make Me Sick (short film)	No	No	No	No	No	Yes	Yong-hee
2005	Always Behind You (short film)	Yes	Yes	Yes	No	Yes	Yes	Jun-ho
2005	Noryangjin Totoro (short film)	No	No	No	No	No	Yes	Kim Young-min
2005	Slowly (short film)	No	No	No	No	No	Yes	Man
2006	Monologue #1 (short film)	No	No	No	No	No	Yes	
2006	The Wind Stirs (short film)	No	No	No	No	No	Yes	Ki-suk
2006	Screwdriver (short film)	No	No	No	No	No	Yes	
2006	Just Leave Me Alone (short film)	Yes	No	Yes	Yes	No	No	
2006	Les Formidables	No	No	No	No	No	Yes	Yang Jin-soon
2006	Maundy Thursday	No	No	No	No	No	Yes	Hwan-kyu
2006	No Regret	No	No	No	No	No	Yes	
2007	Picnic (short film)	No	No	No	No	No	Yes	
2007	Lost (short film)	No	No	No	No	No	Yes	
2007	Thirsty, Thirsty (short film)	No	No	No	No	No	Yes	
2007	Speechless (short film)	Yes	Yes	Yes	No	Yes	No	
2007	The Worst Guy Ever	No	No	No	No	No	Yes	advertising company employee
2008	Viva! Love	No	No	No	No	No	Yes	student boarder 1
2008	Love is Protein (animated short)	No	No	No	No	No	Yes	Jae-ho
2008	Lovers (omnibus, includes Slowly, Screwdriver, Monologue #1, Lost)	No	No	No	No	No	Yes	
2009	One Step More to the Sea (short film)	No	No	No	No	No	Yes	cafe guest
2009	Breathless	Yes	Yes	Yes	No	No	Yes	Sang-hoon
2010	Looking for My Wife	No	No	No	No	No	Yes	Dong-min
2010	Magic and Loss	No	No	No	No	No	Yes	
2011	Departure (short film)	Yes	Yes	Yes	No	No	Yes	He
2011	Immature (from omnibus A Time to Love)	Yes	Yes	Yes	No	No	No	
2011	The King of Pigs (animated)	No	No	No	No	No	Yes	Jung Jong-suk (voice)
2012	Shibata & Nagao (short film)	Yes	Yes	No	No	No	No	
2012	Our Homeland	No	No	No	No	No	Yes	Mr. Yang
2012	The Innocent Man (TV)	No	No	No	No	No	Yes	Han Jae-shik
2013	Jury (short film)	No	No	No	No	No	Yes	
2013	Chuugakusei Maruyama	No	No	No	No	No	Yes	Korean star
2013	Dance Together (short film)	Yes	No	No	No	No	No	
2013	Let Me Out	No	No	No	No	No	Yes	himself
2013	The Fake (animated)	No	No	No	No	No	Yes	Min-chul (voice)
2014	Inspiring Generation (TV)	No	No	No	No	No	Yes	Hwang Bong-shik
2014	It's Okay, That's Love (TV)	No	No	No	No	No	Yes	Jang Jae-beom
2014	Set Me Free	No	No	No	No	No	Yes	Beom-tae's father
2014	Short Plays	Yes	No	No	No	No	No	
2015	Intimate Enemies	No	No	No	No	No	Yes	Eumbuki
2015	The Scholar Who Walks the Night (TV)	No	No	No	No	No	Yes	Hae-seo
2016	A Quiet Dream	No	No	No	No	No	Yes	Ik-june
2016	Canola	No	No	No	No	No	Yes	Choong-seop
2017	Queen of Mystery	No	No	No	No	No	Yes	Jang Do-jang
2017	The Poet and the Boy	No	No	No	No	No	Yes	Hyon Taek-gi
2017	Bad Guys 2	No	No	No	No	No	Yes	Jang Sung-cheol
2017	Wilderness: Part One	No	No	No	No	No	Yes	Kenji
2017	Wilderness: Part Two	No	No	No	No	No	Yes	Kenji
2018	To. Jenny (TV)	No	No	No	No	No	Yes	Kim Hyung-soo
2024	Confession	No	No	No	No	No	Yes	Ryu Ji-yong

=== Television shows ===
Year	Title	Role	Notes	Ref.
2023	Black: I Saw the Devil	Cast member	Crime Thriller Crime Documentary (Season 2)	

== Awards and nominations ==
Year	Award	Category	Nominated work
2005	Mise-en-scène Short Film Festival	Best Actor	Ooh, You Make Me Sick
2005	31st Seoul Independent Film Festival	Audience Award	Always Behind You
2009	38th International Film Festival Rotterdam	VPRO Tiger Award	Breathless
2009	10th Las Palmas de Gran Canaria International Film Festival	Best Actor	Breathless
2009	11th Deauville Asian Film Festival	Best Film; International Critics' Prize	Breathless
2009	13th Fantasia Festival	Best Feature Film; Best Male Performance	Breathless
2009	Buenos Aires International Festival of Independent Cinema	Audience Award (International)	Breathless
2009	3rd Asia Pacific Screen Awards	High Commendation	Breathless
2009	Fantastic Fest	New Wave Award - Best Director	Breathless
2009	Tokyo FILMeX Festival	Grand Prize; Special Jury Prize	Breathless
2009	17th Chunsa Film Art Awards	Special Jury Prize	Breathless
2009	18th Buil Film Awards	Best New Director	Breathless
2009	10th Busan Film Critics Awards	Best Director	Breathless
2009	30th Blue Dragon Film Awards	Best New Actor	Breathless
2009	12th Director's Cut Awards	Best Independent Film Director	Breathless
2010	1st KOFRA (Korea Film Reporters Association) Awards	Discovery Award	Breathless
2010	10th Asiana International Short Film Festival	Best Korean Short Film	Shibata & Nagao
2018	91st Kinema Junpo Awards	Best Supporting Actor	Wilderness
2018	12th Asian Film Awards	Best Supporting Actor	Wilderness
