= Breathless (2008 film) =

- French theatrical poster
- Directed by: Yang Ik-june
- Written by: Yang Ik-june
- Produced by: Jang Seong-jin
- Starring: Yang Ik-june; Kim Kkot-bi
- Cinematography: Yun Jong-ho
- Edited by: Lee Yeon-jung
- Music by: Park Ji-woong
- Release dates: October 8, 2008 (Busan International Film Festival); April 16, 2009 (South Korea)
- Running time: 130 minutes
- Country: South Korea
- Language: Korean
- Box office: US$686,703

Breathless (Korean: 똥파리; RR: Ttongpari; lit. 'shitfly') is a 2008 South Korean drama film by Yang Ik-june and the story revolves around child abuse and loan sharking. A loan shark named Sang-Hoon finds himself striking a friendship with a troubled schoolgirl, Yeon-Hee, as he faces his own troubled past with his abusive father.

Breathless has won the Grand Prize at the 2009 Tokyo Filmex, the Silver Screen Award at the 2009 Singapore International Film Festival, the Tiger Award at the 2009 Rotterdam International Film Festival, the NETPAC Award at the 2009 Karlovy Vary International Film Festival, and the 30th Blue Dragon Awards for Best New Actor (Yang Ik-june) and Best New Actress (Kim Kkot-bi tied with Park Bo-young From Scandal Makers). It saw over 100,000 admissions in South Korea.

== Plot ==
Sang-hoon is a foul-mouthed and violent gangster working for an illegal money-lending organization run by his long-time friend and loan shark, Man-shik. He is first seen attacking protestors who are disrupting the work of a construction company with the other members of the organization. Sang-hoon has a nephew, Hyung-in, whom he adores. His sister cares about the nephew also, even inviting him to dinner. Sang-hoon and her are on less than friendly terms and he avoids her. It is revealed that when he was a kid, his abusive father once had a quarrel with his mother and stabbed his sister by accident. His mother was then hit by a car. It is implied that his father has remarried.

One day, after visiting his nephew, he accidentally spits on a high school student, Han Yeon-hee, who demands that he apologize. They get into an argument and he punches her, knocking her unconscious. When she wakes up, she realizes that Sang-hoon was waiting for her to awake and has wiped her clothes clean. Undaunted by his ferocity, she demands compensation from him. He is intrigued by her spunk and they form a tenuous friendship. While Sang-hoon believes that Yeon-hee comes from a rich family, they, in fact, have trouble regularly paying the rent. Her father is a war veteran who has delusions that Yeon-hee's mother is still alive. Both her father and brother, Han Young-jae, frequently threaten and verbally abuse her.

A junior colleague of Sang-hoon recruits a friend, Young-jae, to work as a debt collector for Man-shik. On his first day, he accompanies Sang-hoon and his friend on their rounds. He is hesitant and Sang-hoon berates him.

One day, as Sang-hoon visits his father – recently released from prison for stabbing Sang-hoon's sister with a knife – his father has already cut his own wrists. It is then that he realizes how much he still loves his father. That same day, Yeon-hee's father is even more paranoid and threatens her with a knife. Sang-hoon and Yeon-hee meet up for a drink and both weep, overcome with emotion.

Sang-hoon tells Man-shik that it will be his last day as a gangster and invites him to meet Yeon-hee, his sister and Hyun-in. Man-shik also decides that he has had enough and wants to open a gogi gui restaurant. On his last day as a debt collector, he is doing the rounds with Young-jae. Young-jae beats a debtor against Sang-hoon's wishes, and the debtor responds by hitting Sang-hoon with a hammer. As Sang-hoon walks away with Young-jae, blood starts to flow out of his nose. He asks Young-jae for a handkerchief, but Young-jae attacks him with a hammer, and leaves him dying by the road.

In the epilogue, it is strongly suggested that Sang-hoon died. Yeon-hee, Hyung-in, Sang-hoon's sister and father enjoy dinner together at Man-shik's newly opened restaurant. On leaving, Yeon-hee sees her brother destroying a street-side food stall like her late mother's.

== Cast ==
- Yang Ik-june as Sang-hoon
- Kim Kkot-bi as Yeon-hee
- Jung Man-sik as Man-shik
- Lee Hwan as Young-jae
- Yun Seung-hun as Hwan-kyu
- Kim Hee-su as Yeong-in
- Park Jung-sun as Seung-chul (Sang-hoon's father)
- Lee Seung-yeon as Hyeon-seo (Sang-hoon's sister)
- Oh Ji-hye as Yeon-hee's teacher
- Gil Hae-yeon as Yeon-hee's mother
- Park Byung-eun as Restaurant customer
