= The Scam (film) =

- Film poster
- Directed by: Lee Ho-jae
- Written by: Lee Ho-jae
- Produced by: Kim Su-jin; Yoon In-beom; David Cho
- Starring: Park Yong-ha; Kim Min-jung; Park Hee-soon
- Cinematography: Gi Se-hun
- Edited by: Shin Min-kyung
- Music by: Mok Young-jin
- Production companies: Sponge Entertainment; Bidangil Pictures; Silk Road
- Distributed by: Showbox
- Release date: February 12, 2009
- Running time: 119 minutes
- Country: South Korea
- Language: Korean

The Scam (Korean: 작전; RR: Jakjeon) is a 2009 South Korean crime thriller film and was the first South Korean film to tackle the stock market.

== Plot ==
After losing everything, Hyun-soo (Park Yong-ha) spends five years glued to the computer screen as an unshaven, full-time "ant" (individual investor). He eventually reaches the top of the game after a painful diet of instant noodles and sacrificing the cost of three luxury sedans. He vows to quit once and for all when he achieves his goal, a nine-digit savings account that will support his mother and studious younger brother.

One day he hits the jackpot, not knowing that there are repercussions to disrupting a stock market scam. He ignites the fury of Hwang Jong-gu (Park Hee-soon), a gangster-turned-financier bidding for entry into the top percentile of the rich and powerful. A fresh mobster persona, Hwang feigns elegance in his initialized Italian shoes, only to resort to kicking people for dramatic effect. He also begins every sentence with an "OK" even though he cannot tolerate the full English phrasings of his Korean-American partner.

Hwang, however, doesn't dwell on past indiscretions. He recognizes Hyun-soo's talents and employs him for the biggest scam yet, also giving him a nice makeover. Hyun-soo joins the other members of Hwang's dream team for the 60 billion won heist: Jo Min-hyeong, an elite stock broker who doubles as the think tank of fraudulent trades (musical star Kim Mu-yeol makes his big screen debut); sexy private banker Yoo Seo-yeon (Kim Min-jung); Park Chang-joo, a second-generation chaebol CEO facing a management crisis (veteran supporting actor Jo Deok-hyun); and Bryan Choi (Kim Jun-seong), a Korean-American fund manager who fakes foreign investment as a "black-haired foreigner."

These are professional stock gamblers who win the house by reading everyone else's cards. They opt for new scientific technology, the cream of the crop for stock scams. Park's chaebol company invests heavily in a friend's new environmental research and Seo-yeon has one of her clients buy the company's shares. They have a famous broadcaster hype public attention while Bryan creates the illusion of foreign investment, and the cash starts flowing in from blind "ants."

A bigger scam, however, unfolds within the ring of scam artists. Outsider Hyun-soo becomes the ultimate insider as he becomes the pawn in a tangled web of backstabbing intrigue.

== Cast ==
- Park Yong-ha as Kang Hyun-soo, individual investor
- Kim Min-jung as Yoo Seo-yeon, financial planner
- Park Hee-soon as Hwang Jong-gu, gangster-turned-financier
- Kim Mu-yeol as Jo Min-hyeong, bond broker
- Jo Deok-hyun as Park Chang-joo, big stockbroker
- Kim Jun-seong as Brian Choi, Korean-American fund manager
- Lee Dong-yong as Department chief Han
- Jo Jae-yoon as Deputy Lee
- Park Jae-woong as Deok-sang
- Shin Hyun-jong as Scholar Woo
- Kwon Hyung-joon as Kin Seung-beom
- Yoo Seung-mok as Yoon Sang-tae
- Kim Seung-hoon as Lee Jae-hak
- Jeon Gook-hwan as Masan Chang-too
- Lee Yeong-ih as Hyun-soo's mother
- Park Yong-yeon as Kang Joon-soo
- Bae Ho-geun as Park Ji-hyeok
- Kim Young-hoon as Secretary Nam
