= Running Turtle =

- Theatrical poster
- Hangul: 거북이 달린다
- RR: Geobugi dallinda
- MR: Kŏbugi tallinda
- Directed by: Lee Yeon-woo
- Written by: Lee Yeon-woo
- Produced by: Lee Choon-yeon; Lee Mi-yeong
- Starring: Kim Yoon-seok; Jung Kyung-ho
- Cinematography: Jo Yong-gyu
- Edited by: Steve M. Choe; Jin Lee
- Music by: Lee Byung-hoon; Jang Young-gyu
- Distributed by: Showbox
- Release date: June 11, 2009
- Running time: 117 minutes
- Country: South Korea
- Language: Korean
- Box office: US$16,823,955

Running Turtle (Korean: 거북이 달린다; RR: Geobugi dallinda) is a 2009 South Korean martial arts action comedy film about a countryside detective trying to capture a legendary prison breaker. Released on June 11, 2009, it was directed by Lee Yeon-woo and starred Kim Yoon-seok and Jung Kyung-ho.

== Plot ==
Jo Pil-seong is an idle detective who spends his time scratching off lottery tickets in his office, while his wife and children work in a manhwa shop. Pil-seong secretly takes his wife's emergency money of ₩300,000 and tells his friend to bet it on a bull named Gomi in a bullfight. Gomi is declared a winner, and Pil-seong's friends celebrate their victory later that night as they wait for him to arrive.

Meanwhile, an escaped prisoner named Song Gi-tae intervenes in the celebration and steals Pil-seong's money. When Pil-seong finds out what has happened he confronts the criminal but suffers a humiliating defeat.

Pil-seong reports to his colleagues and his boss that he encountered the infamous Gi-tae, but none of them believed in him. In an attempt to recapture Gi-tae, Pil-seong decides to recruit his friends (who were beaten up by Gi-tae earlier) and find him inside a house with his girlfriend, Kyeong-joo. Formulating a plan, Pil-seong tells his friends to stand by the outside window of where Gi-tae is, while Pil-seong himself sneaks into the house, armed with pepper spray. Gi-tae, however, was aware of Pil-seong's presence and once escaped before the police arrived. Before leaving, Gi-tae takes out his knife, stabs Pil-seong's right hand, and warns him that the next time he'll kill him if he tries to capture him again.

Suffering from public humiliation as well as being kicked out of the house by his wife (because of her money), Pil-seong decides to train himself to fight Gi-tae. When taking taekwondo lessons one day, Pil-seong learns that the upper part of the human rib cage is the vulnerable area for taking his opponents down. He later buys himself his handgun as his own personal defense weapon.

In the next encounter with Gi-tae, Pil-seong got him surrounded by keeping Kyeong-joo hostage. As he forced Gi-tae to keep moving on, Pil-seong's friends intervened, causing Gi-tae to escape once again. Pil-seong's friends beg him to give up capturing Gi-tae for his own sake, but he refuses.

Meanwhile, one of Gi-tae's accomplices, Pyo Jae-seok, was arrested by Pil-seong. He confiscates Jae-seok's handphone and orders him to bring back the money that Gi-tae stole from him. Learning that Gi-tae is hiding somewhere in a fishing village, Pil-seong uses a bullhorn and asks Gi-tae to reveal himself.

Realizing that Pil-seong has the money and Jaeseok's cell phone, Gi-tae calls him and tells him that he is next to the manhwa shop where his family works. Holding a gasoline tank, he gives Pil-seong one hour to meet him and bring the money, or else he'll destroy the manhwa shop with his family inside.

Pil-seong did as he was told but also asked his colleagues and policemen to arrive at his family's manhwa shop. Pil-seong arrived in a small fenced area and buried the money before Gi-tae came. Wanting to capture Gi-tae, he non-fatally shoots him in the stomach with his handgun. He discards his handgun and takes Gi-tae's knife and asks for a fair fight. The battle then ensures as both Pil-seong and Gi-tae beat each other up to the pulp.

Finally cornering Pil-seong, Gi-tae asks him for the money and threatens to kill him if he doesn't. Gi-tae finds the money and walks off. However, Pil-seong regained consciousness and eventually defeated his opponent by accurately striking him in the upper rib cage. Pil-seong is barely conscious of the fight but is satisfied with his efforts to capture Gi-tae. Pil-seong's colleagues later find him in the cell sleeping with Gi-tae handcuffed.

A few days later, Pil-seong and his colleagues were awarded a higher position as officers and led a ceremonial parade to Pil-seong's daughter's school. The film ends as Pil-seong and their fellow officers give a salute.

== Cast ==
- Kim Yoon-seok as Jo Pil-seong
- Jung Kyung-ho as Song Gi-tae
- Kyeon Mi-ri as Detective Jo's wife
- Sunwoo Sun as Kyeong-joo, Gi-tae's girlfriend
- Kim Ji-na as Ok-soon
- Shin Jung-geun as Yong-bae
- Choi Kwon as Pyo Jae-seok
- Kim Hye-ji as Joo-rang
- Joo Jin-mo as Team leader Yang
- Lee Moo-saeng as Detective Lee

== Release and box office ==
Running Turtle opened in South Korea on June 11, 2009 and topped the box office over its first weekend with a total of 480,293 admissions. It led the box office for a second consecutive weekend, and as of August 2 had accumulated a total of 3,051,136 admissions and grossed US$16,823,955.
