= No Tail to Tell =

2026 South Korean television series

- Promotional poster
- Also known as: Human from Today
- Hangul: 오늘부터 인간입니다만
- Lit.: Starting Today, I am Human
- RR: Oneulbuteo inganimnidaman
- MR: Onŭlbut'ŏ in'ganimnidaman
- Genre: Romantic comedy; Fantasy
- Written by: Park Chan-young; Jo Ah-young
- Directed by: Kim Jung-kwon
- Starring: Kim Hye-yoon; Lomon
- Country of origin: South Korea
- Original language: Korean
- No. of episodes: 12

Production
- Running time: 60 minutes
- Production companies: Binge Works; MOG Films

Original release
- Network: SBS TV
- Release: January 16 – February 28, 2026

No Tail to Tell (Korean: 오늘부터 인간입니다만) is a 2026 South Korean television series co-written by Park Chan-young and Jo Ah-young, directed by Kim Jung-kwon, and starring Kim Hye-yoon and Lomon. The series depicts the story of a nine-tailed fox woman, after an unexpected accident with a renowned soccer star transforms her into a human. It aired on SBS TV from January 16, to February 28, 2026 every Friday and Saturday at 21:50 (KST). It is also available for streaming on Netflix globally.

== Synopsis ==
The series follows the story of Eun-ho, a quirky gumiho who revels in the pleasures of the human world while deliberately avoiding good deeds to maintain her immortality. Eun-Ho embraces her eternal youth, savoring life's delights without the burden of moral obligations.

Her carefree existence is upended when an unexpected incident involving Kang Si-yeol, a world-class soccer player known for his dazzling talent and overwhelming narcissism, alters the course of her life. Following a fateful accident, Eun-ho finds herself transformed into an ordinary human, forcing her to navigate the complexities of human emotions and responsibilities for the first time.

== Cast ==
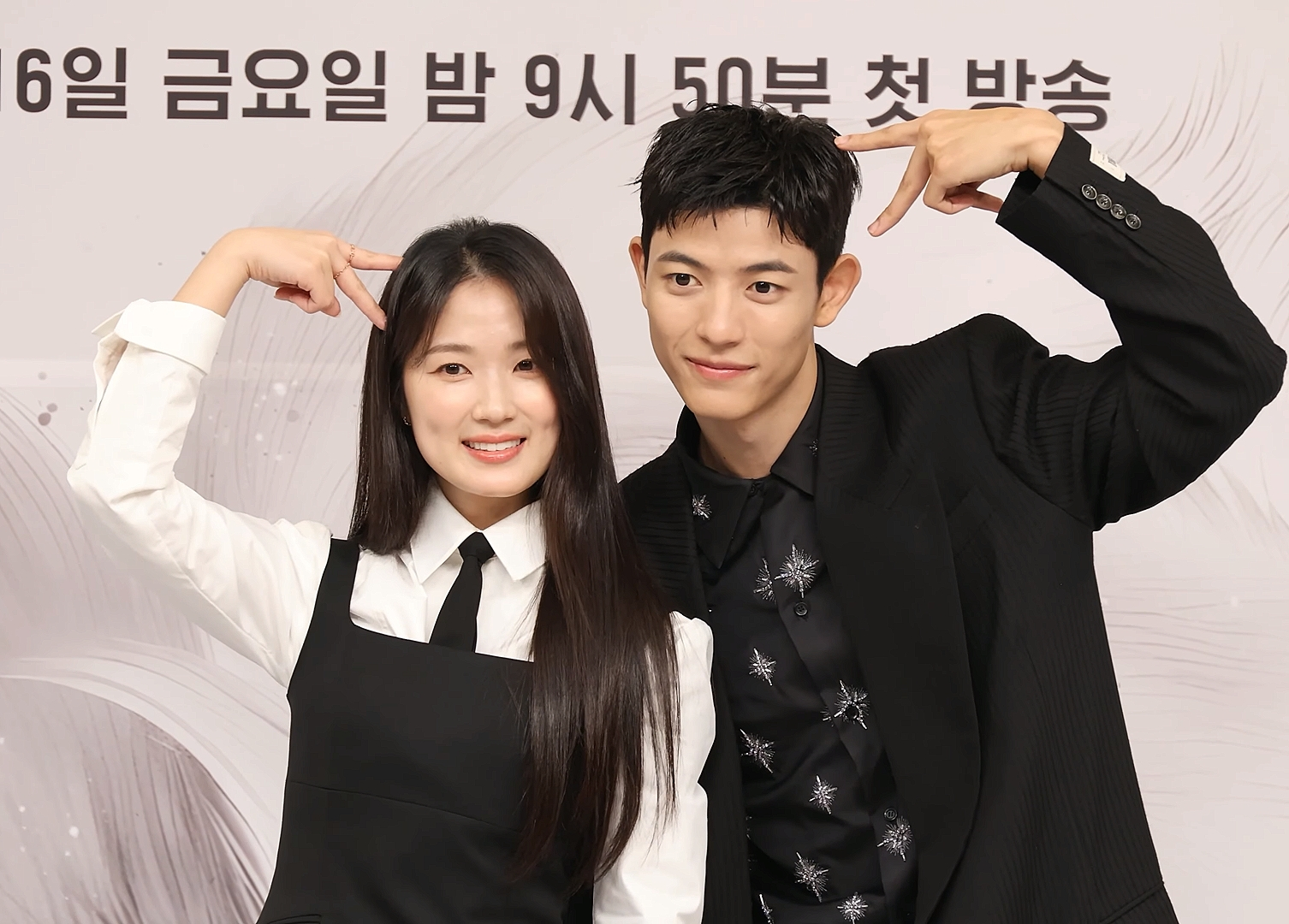
Kim Hye-yoon and Lomon at the press conference for the series in January 2026

=== Main ===
- Kim Hye-yoon as Eun-ho / Kim Ok-soon (Note: Eun-ho is the character's name as a gumiho, while Kim Ok-soon is her name in human form.)

A nine-tailed fox (gumiho) from Mount Myohyang who has lived for centuries. Having abandoned her pursuit of becoming human, she maintains a careful balance between good and evil while amassing wealth, until her orderly life is disrupted.

- Lomon as Kang Si-yeol

A world-class football striker, known for his exceptional talent and obsessive self-discipline. Despite his fame and wealth, he lives a strictly regimented life centered on football, until his routine is disrupted by a chance of reconnection.

=== Supporting ===
People around Eun-ho

- Lee Si-woo as Geum-ho

A mysterious character who suddenly becomes entangled with Eun-ho through a fateful connection.

- Kim Tae-woo as Jang Do-cheol

A local troublemaker who is secretly a shaman. He risks everything to track down traces of a gumiho.

- Choi Seung-yoon as Lee Yoon

A wealthy and arrogant fourth-generation heir of Geumsu Group. Known for his reckless behavior and sociopathic tendencies.

- Joo Jin-mo as Pagun

He is the seventh of the Seven Stars, the deity of the Big Dipper, known as Pagunseonggun.

People around Si-yeol

- Jang Dong-joo as Hyun Woo-seok

A former youth national soccer team prospect who suffers from a changed future due to an unfortunate accident.

- Lee Seung-joon as Hyun Sang-chul

He is the father of the soccer player Hyun Woo-seok.

- Hong Soo-hyun as Hong Yeon-su

An agent who discovers Kang Si-yeol's talent and potential and has been his partner for nine years.

- Cha Mi-kyung as Kim Bok-soon

Si-yeol's grandmother who has sacrificed much to support his football career.

Daheung Citizen Club

- In Gyo-jin as Park Yong-gil

A former youth national football team assistant coach who becomes the manager of a fourth-division citizen club.

- Yoo Hwan as Seo Beom

An attacking midfielder of the team nearing the end of his career.

- Ji Seung-joon as Bae Jeong-bae

A key player on the soccer team, he contributes both in attack and defense with his high energy.

- Kim Tae-jung as Hwang Chi-su

The center back of the team.

- Kim Tae-hee as Kim Kyung-hoon

The backup goalkeeper of the team.

=== Guest ===
- Woo Da-vi as Department store girl

== Production ==
=== Development ===
The series is directed by Kim Jung-kwon, a filmmaker known for his notable films and television series such as Ditto (2000), Miracle of a Giving Fool (2008), Lie After Lie (2020), Love to Hate You (2023), and Maestra: Strings of Truth (2023–2024). The script is co-written by Park Chan-young and Jo Ah-young who previously collaborated on Best Chicken (2019). It is planned by Studio S and co-produced by Binge Works and MOG Films.

=== Casting ===
On July 10, 2024, several news outlets reported that Shin Se-kyung and Lomon were in discussions to star in the series. However, on August 16, Kim Hye-yoon was announced as a new candidate for the female lead role. By September 4, SBS officially confirmed that Kim and Lomon as the lead actors for the series. On September 26, it was revealed that Lee Si-woo would be co-starring alongside Kim and Lomon. The following day, Jang Dong-joo announced the he would also be joining the cast.

=== Filming ===
Filming began in September 2024, with director Kim Jung-kwon revealing on September 28 through an Instagram post that the cast had held their first script reading.

== Release ==
The series was originally slated to air in the second half of 2025 in SBS's Monday–Tuesday time slot. However, following revisions to the network's 2025 programming lineup, the broadcast was postponed to the first half of 2026. The series was later confirmed to premiere on January 16, 2026, airing in the Friday–Saturday time slot. Netflix announced that the series would additionally be made available for global streaming on its platform.

== Reception ==
=== Critical response ===
The series received mixed-to-positive reviews from critics. Internationally, it was praised for its lead performances and unique take on the supernatural genre. Pierce Conran of the South China Morning Post described it as a "lively fantasy romcom," highlighting the "impressive chemistry" between leads Kim Hye-yoon and Lomon, as well as the show's "spot-on" pacing. Similarly, Mashable Middle East noted that Kim's "expressive acting" and Lomon's "grounded charm" successfully anchored the show's more whimsical supernatural elements.

Screen Rant characterized the series as an "instant hit" that effectively blended Korean folklore with the complexities of a "love-hate relationship", using its fantasy themes as tools to explore deeper concepts of identity, freedom, and human connection. Domestically, Sports Chosun praised the script's "mature emotional depth" and its successful subversion of the traditional gumiho myth into a "refreshing salvage fantasy romance".

Domestically, evaluations were more divided later in its run, with media highlighting a sharp decline in viewer engagement. Despite high anticipation due to Kim's established track record in the fantasy-romance genre, the series struggled to retain domestic viewers, with ratings continuously dropping to a series low of 2.2% by its eighth episode. Kim Won-hee of Sports Khan pointed out that the show's novel premise was ultimately undermined by weak scriptwriting, juvenile dialogue, and unconvincing computer-generated imagery (CGI) that disrupted viewer immersion.

A significant point of discussion was the evolution of Kim Hye-yoon's screen image. Critics observed that after playing "heroic protagonists" in titles like Extraordinary You (2019) and Lovely Runner (2024), her role as the "complicated antihero" Eun-ho—a gumiho who grants wishes in exchange for "negative karma"—showcased a broader acting range. Hurtado for Screen Rant praised her transition from a "self-assured" supernatural being to a character seeking redemptive growth and humanity. Joel Keller of Decider concluded the critical consensus with a "Stream It" verdict, remarking that the series' unique blend of whimsy and its redemption-focused arc set it apart from typical romantic comedies. Meanwhile, local commentary regarding her performance noted that her high-pitched vocal delivery and cartoonish acting tone caused viewer fatigue. Kim Wonhee of Sports Khan argued that instead of conveying a charmingly abrasive "MZ gumiho," the performance felt overly one-dimensional and failed to deliver the necessary directional nuance to rescue a failing script.

=== Viewership ===
Upon its release, the Korean drama became an immediate streaming hit. According to data from Netflix, it entered the Global Top 10 chart for non-English television shows at number six during its debut week, accumulating 2.1 million views with only its first two episodes available. Additionally, the series reached the number one spot in several individual countries shortly after its premiere.

No Tail to Tell : South Korea viewers per episode (thousands)

Season	Episode number												Average
Season	1	2	3	4	5	6	7	8	9	10	11	12	Average
1	731	653	608	536	506	564	545	482	808	679	696	777	632

Source: Audience measurement performed nationwide by Nielsen Korea.

Average TV viewership ratings
Ep.	Original broadcast date	Average audience share (Nielsen Korea)	
Ep.	Original broadcast date	Nationwide	Seoul
1	January 16, 2026	3.7% (16th)	3.6% (14th)
2	January 17, 2026	2.7% (23rd)	2.7% (20th)
3	January 23, 2026	3.1% (18th)	3.0% (17th)
4	January 24, 2026	2.4% (25th)	2.1% (27th)
5	January 30, 2026	2.4% (21st)	2.2% (23rd)
6	January 31, 2026	2.7% (20th)	2.6% (20th)
7	February 6, 2026	2.7% (20th)	2.3% (23rd)
8	February 7, 2026	2.2% (26th)	2.3% (23rd)
9	February 20, 2026	4.2% (12th)	3.8% (11th)
10	February 21, 2026	3.2% (18th)	3.0% (16th)
11	February 27, 2026	3.7% (14th)	3.6% (13th)
12	February 28, 2026	3.7% (15th)	3.8% (11th)
Average		3.1%	2.9%
In the table above, the blue numbers represent the lowest ratings and the red numbers represent the highest ratings.; N/A denotes ratings that were not published.

=== Accolades ===
Name of the award ceremony, year presented, category, nominee of the award, and the result of the nomination
Award ceremony	Year	Category	Nominee / Work	Result	Ref.
Blue Dragon Ranking Awards (Note: The Blue Dragon Ranking is a popularity award hosted by Sports Chosun, the organizer of the Blue Dragon Film Awards and Blue Dragon Series Awards. It recognizes trend-setting actors by presenting semiannual awards for Best Actor and Best Actress.)	2026	Best Actress (Note: First Half of 2026.)	Kim Hye-yoon	Won	
iMBC Awards (Note: iMBC Awards, hosted by iMBC Entertainment, MBC Group's only entertainment news outlet, honors artists and actors with outstanding achievements in the industry.)	2026	Best Actress	Kim Hye-yoon	Pending	
Korea Broadcasting Prizes (Note: The Korea Broadcasting Prizes, which began in 1973 to commemorate Broadcasting Day, is a ceremony awards that honors outstanding broadcast programs and broadcasters.)	2026	Best Actress	Kim Hye-yoon	Pending	
Seoul International Drama Awards	2026	Outstanding Asian Star (Female)	Kim Hye-yoon	Nominated	
