= Man on the Edge (film) =

- Theatrical release poster
- Directed by: Jo Jin-kyu
- Screenplay by: Park Gyu-tae
- Produced by: Kim Woo-jae
- Starring: Park Shin-yang
- Cinematography: Jung Ki-won
- Edited by: Shin Min-kyung
- Music by: Jang Young-gyu; Dalpalan
- Distributed by: Showbox
- Release date: 9 January 2013
- Running time: 128 minutes
- Country: South Korea
- Language: Korean
- Box office: US$21.9 million

Man on the Edge (Korean: 박수건달; RR: Baksugeondal) is a 2013 South Korean film directed by Jo Jin-kyu. The story follows Gwang-ho (Park Shin-yang), the right-hand man of a powerful crime boss, as he struggles with the realization that he is destined to become a shaman. Man on the Edge is Jo's fifth film; his debut feature, My Wife Is a Gangster, is credited with sparking the popularity of gangster themes in Korean cinema. In a press conference for the film, lead actor Park Shin-yang told the audience that among his other preparations, he went to a shaman to learn more about the traditional practices.

== Plot ==
After a knife wound alters the fate line on his palm, high-class gangster Gwang-ho experiences a series of strange events, including voices beckoning him and objects inexplicably moving around him. One such event occurs when a newspaper, seemingly blown by the wind, persistently follows Gwang-ho as he tries to run away. The newspaper features a large ad for a fortune teller, whom Gwang-ho decides to visit. The fortune teller reveals that the strange events are being caused by a spirit. In order to accept the spirit and begin fulfilling his destiny as a shaman, he must perform a ritual. Unable to escape his fate, Gwang-ho begins a double life, working as a fortune teller by day and a criminal by evening—a life that is increasingly difficult to maintain. Meanwhile, Tae-joo (Kim Jung-tae), a rival member of the gang, is plotting to get rid of Gwang-ho and take his place. Tae-joo's henchmen spy on Gwang-ho, and as they begin to discover his secret, they use their discoveries to try to destroy him.

== Cast ==
- Park Shin-yang as Park Gwang-Ho
- Kim Jung-tae as Cha Tae-Joo
- Uhm Ji-won as Fortune Teller Myung
- Jung Hye-young as Dr. Choi Mi-Sook
- Yoon Song-yi as Han Soo-Min
- Kim Sung-kyun as Ko Choon-Bong
- Choi Ji-ho as Wang Dae-Sik
- Choi Il-hwa as the boss
- Park Jung-ja as the elder fortune teller
- Kim Hyeong-beom as Cha Tae-Joo's henchman
- Cho Jin-woong as the prosecutor

== Release and reception ==
The film was released on January 9, 2013. It remained at #1 at the South Korean box office throughout the month, selling 3,897,969 tickets during its theatrical run.

It received mixed reviews, with audiences generally rating it higher than film critics. Many reporters described it as a fun movie with compelling performances; some criticized the story's unrealistic circumstances, while others hailed the story as unique and interesting.

When the film was released in Japan, Japanese production and distribution company SPO held a 'Park Shin-yang Festival 2014' at Toho Cinemas Roppongi Hills. The festival ran from February 1–14, screening other films featuring the actor in addition to the main feature.

== Awards and nominations ==
Year	Awards	Category	Recipient	Result	Ref.
2013	49th Baeksang Arts Awards	Most Popular - Actor (Film)	Park Shin-yang	Nominated	
2013	49th Baeksang Arts Awards	Most Popular - Actress (Film)	Uhm Ji-won	Nominated	
2013	22nd Buil Film Awards	Best Supporting Actress	Uhm Ji-won	Nominated	
2013	50th Grand Bell Awards	Best Supporting Actress	Uhm Ji-won	Nominated	
2013	50th Grand Bell Awards	Best New Actress	Chun Min-hee	Nominated	
