= Teo Yoo =

German and Korean actor (born 1981)

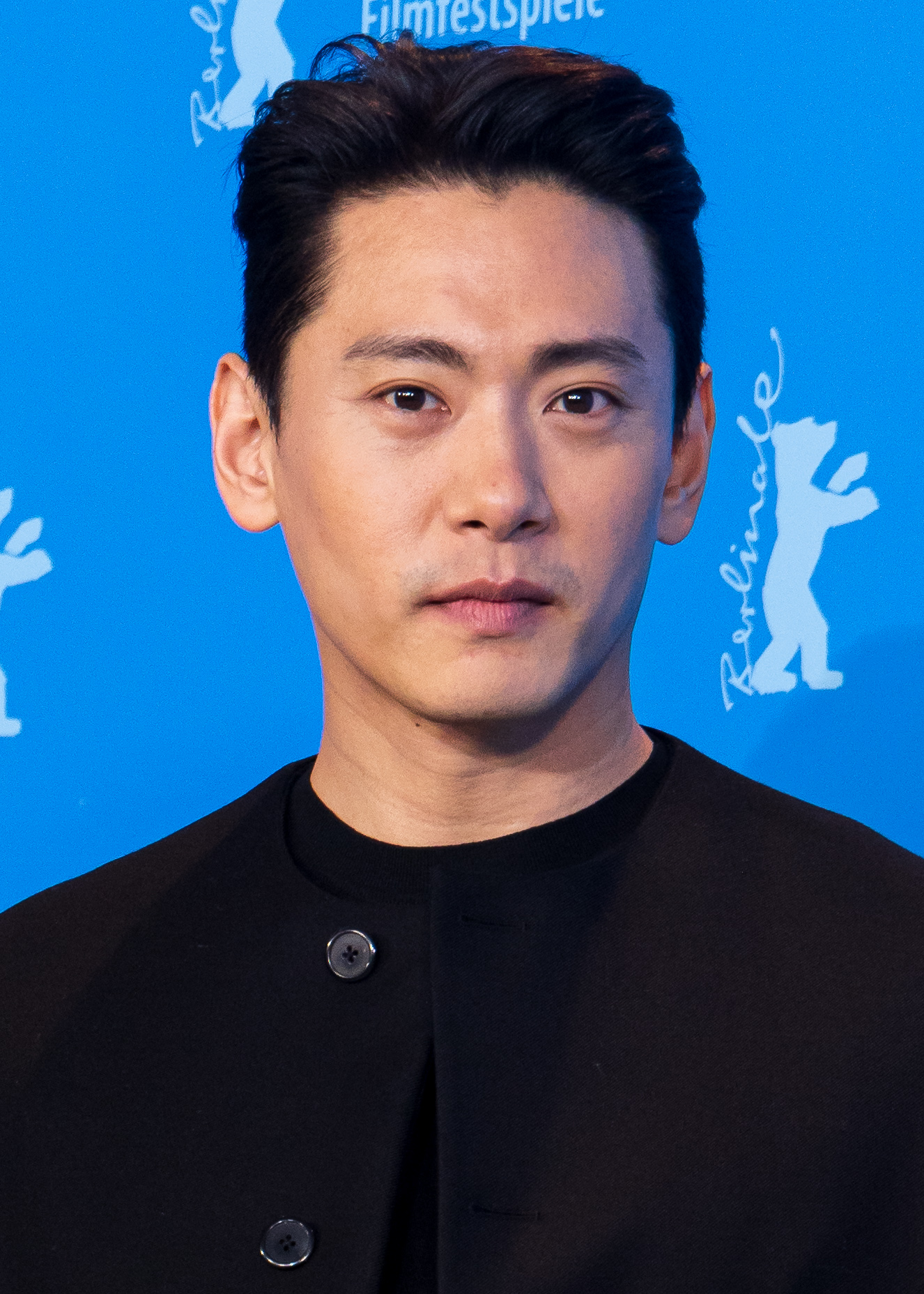
- Yoo in February 2023
- Born: April 11, 1981 (age 45); Cologne, West Germany
- Education: Royal Academy of Dramatic Art
- Occupation: Actor
- Years active: 2003–present
- Agent: CAA
- Spouse: Nikki S. Lee (m. 2007)

Korean name
- Hangul: 유태오
- RR: Yu Taeo
- MR: Yu T'aeo
- Website: c-jes.com

Teo Yoo (Korean: 유태오) is a German-South Korean actor. He has starred as Viktor Tsoi in the biographical musical film Leto (2018), and won the Blue Dragon Film Award for Best New Actor in 2021. In 2023, he gained wider recognition for starring in the Netflix original series Love to Hate You and romantic drama film Past Lives, earning a nomination for the BAFTA Award for Best Actor in a Leading Role. In June 2024, he was invited to become a member of the Academy of Motion Picture Arts and Sciences.

== Early life and education ==
Yoo was born on April 11, 1981 in Cologne, West Germany to South Korean parents. His father was a miner and his mother was a nurse. After graduating from high school in Germany, he enrolled in the Lee Strasberg Theatre and Film Institute in New York City and later, the Royal Academy of Dramatic Art in London to study acting.

== Personal life ==
In 2007, Yoo married artist Nikki S. Lee. They reside in Seoul, South Korea.

He is fluent in German, English, and Korean.

== Filmography ==
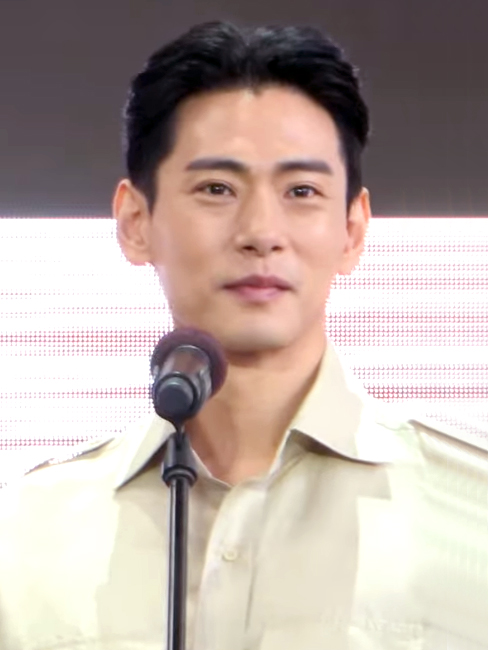
Yoo during 2019 Busan International Film Festival

=== Film ===
| Year | Title | Role | Notes | Ref. |
|---|---|---|---|---|
| 2003 | Kim Bab | Kim | Short film | |
| 2004 | Brooklyn Bound | Tommy Woo | | |
| 2006 | Day Night Day Night | Driver | | |
| 2009 | Actresses | Emile | | |
| 2010 | Innocent When You Dream | Gustav Zerga | Short film | |
| 2012 | Love Fiction | Secretary | | |
| 2012 | Shanghai Strangers | The Lover | Short film | |
| 2012 | Code Name: Jackal | Moustache | | |
| 2014 | One on One | Shadow | | |
| 2015 | Seoul Searching | Klaus Kim | | |
| 2015 | Equals | Peter | | |
| 2015 | You Call It Passion | Jey | | |
| 2016 | Bitcoin Heist | Thomas | | |
| 2017 | The Moment | Mr. Kim | | |
| 2017 | TV Cello | Nam June Paik | Short film | |
| 2018 | Lim | Teo | Short film | |
| 2018 | Leto | Viktor Tsoi | | |
| 2019 | Vertigo | Lee Jin-soo | | |
| 2019 | Black Money | Steve Jung | Cameo | |
| 2020 | Pawn | Yoo Deok-hwa | | |
| 2021 | New Year Blues | Rae-hwan | | |
| 2021 | Log in Belgium | —N/a | Director, writer, and editor | |
| 2022 | Decision to Leave | Director Lee | Cameo | |
| 2023 | Past Lives | Hae-sung | | |
| 2027 | Karoshi | TBA | | |

=== Television series ===
| Year | Title | Role | Notes | Ref. |
|---|---|---|---|---|
| 2016 | The Cravings | Teo | | |
| 2019 | Arthdal Chronicles | Ragaz | Cameo | |
| 2019 | Vagabond | Jerome | | |
| 2019 | Chocolate | Kwon Min-sung | | |
| 2020 | The School Nurse Files | Mackenzie | | |
| 2020 | Money Game | Eugene Han | | |
| 2021 | Drama Stage | Yoo Jae-ho | One-act drama Season 4; episode: "Proxy Emotion" | |
| 2021 | Dr. Brain | Secretary Yoon | | |
| 2021 | The Window | Cho Jae-yeon | | |
| 2023 | Love to Hate You | Nam Kang-ho | | |
| 2025 | The Recruit | Jang Kyu | Season 2 | |
| TBA | The Baddest Boy | TBA | | |

=== Television shows ===
| Year | Title | Role | Notes | Ref. |
|---|---|---|---|---|
| 2017 | Buzzer Beater | Himself / cast member | Episode 1–8 | |
| 2021 | Honeymoon Tavern | Himself / cast member | Episode 1–9 | |

=== Music video appearances ===
| Year | Song title | Artist | Ref. |
|---|---|---|---|
| 2017 | "Courting" | Lena Park | |
| 2018 | "Our Last Day" | Noel | |
| 2020 | "Tender Love" | Kim Jae-joong | |

== Discography ==
=== Soundtrack appearances ===
| Title | Year | Album |
|---|---|---|
| "Overwhelming" | 2021 | Log in Belgium OST |
| "Texas Summer" | 2024 | Music Adventure by Accident OST, Part 2 |
| "Like a Friend" with Kian84 & Pani Bottle | 2024 | Music Adventure by Accident OST, Part 3 |

== Accolades ==
=== Awards and nominations ===
Name of the award ceremony, year presented, category, nominated work, and the result of the nomination
| Award ceremony | Year | Category | Nominated work | Result | Ref. |
|---|---|---|---|---|---|
| British Academy Film Awards | 2024 | Best Actor in a Leading Role | Past Lives | Nominated | |
| Blue Dragon Film Awards | 2021 | Best New Actor | Vertigo | Won | |
| Chicago Film Critics Association Awards | 2023 | Best Actor | Past Lives | Nominated | |
| Chicago Film Critics Association Awards | 2023 | Most Promising Performer | Past Lives | Nominated | |
| Chunsa Film Art Awards | 2020 | Best New Actor | Vertigo | Nominated | |
| Film Independent Spirit Awards | 2024 | Best Lead Performance | Past Lives | Nominated | |
| Korea Arts and Culture Awards | 2021 | Film Division | | Won | |
| Korea Cultural Entertainment Awards | 2018 | Best New Actor | Leto | Won | |
| Marie Claire Asia Star Awards | 2023 | Asia Star Award | Past Lives | Won | |
| Marie Claire Film Festival | 2023 | Marie Claire Award | Log in Belgium | Won | |
| MBC Entertainment Awards | 2024 | Popularity Award (Reality) | I'm Born to Play Music | Won | |
| Starpics Thai Film Awards | 2017 | Best Supporting Actor | The Moment | Won | |

=== Listicles ===
Key
| ‡ | Indicates a sole placement listicle |

Name of publisher, year listed, name of listicle and placement
| Publisher | Year | Listicle | Placement | Ref. |
|---|---|---|---|---|
| GQ Korea | 2021 | ‡ Man of the Year | Won | |
| Korean Film Council | 2021 | Korean Actors 200 (Note: The list introduces the 200 actors that best represent the present and future of Korean cinema to the people in the film industry all over the world.) | Placed | |
