= Three Friends (TV series) =

South Korean television series

- Hangul: 세 친구
- RR: Se chingu
- MR: Se ch'in'gu
- Genre: Sitcom; Comedy; Medical drama
- Written by: Lee Sung-eun; Mok Yun-hee; Kim Sung-duk
- Directed by: Song Chang-ui; Lee Taek-joo
- Starring: Jung Woong-in; Park Sang-myun; Yoon Da-hoon
- Country of origin: South Korea
- Original language: Korean
- No. of episodes: 58

Production
- Producers: Song Chang-ui; Jang Tae-yun

Original release
- Network: MBC
- Release: February 14, 2000 – April 16, 2001

Three Friends (Korean: 세 친구) is a South Korean drama/sitcom. It was first broadcast on MBC (Korean language version only). It ran from February 14, 2000 to April 16, 2001, airing 58 episodes. It ran with an average viewership of 20%.

== Cast ==
=== Main Cast ===
- Jung Woong-in as Psychiatrist Jung Woong-in (director of mental health clinic)
- Park Sang-myun as Park Sang-myun (chief of wardrobe sales)
- Yoon Da-hoon as Yoon Da-hoon (gym manager)

=== Supporting Cast ===
- Lee Eui-jung as Eui-jung (Woong In's younger sister)
- Lee Dong-gun as Eui-jung's boyfriend
- Choi Jong-won as the cafe owner (three friends' senior)
- Ban Hyo-jung as Park Hyo-jung (Sang Myun's older sister)
- Jo Eun-sook as a Gym trainer (Sang Myun's lover)
- Ahn Moon-sook as Woong-in's junior (deputy of hospital director)
- Jung Yang as staff nurse
- Park Eun-hye as staff nurse
- Jun Chang-gul as health club president
- Ahn Yun-hong as gym receptionist
- Choi Sang-hak as Yun-hong's younger brother
- Lee Soo-na as Yun-hong's mother
- Jung Sang-hoon as Part time worker at Jong-won's cafe
- Park Ji-soo
- Lee Jung-yong as Gym trainer
- Kim Hyung-il as Woong-in's neighbor
- No Hyun-hee as Woong-in's neighbor
- Kim Yong-gun as Professor (Eui-jung's first love)
- Park Hyun-young as worker at Park Hyo-jung's shop
- Son So-young as Miss Thank You So Young (Yoon Da-hoon's girlfriend)

=== Guests ===
- Seol Soo-jin as Woong-in's patient
- Woo Hee-jin as Drunk girl
- Jung Eun-chan as Eui-jung's stalker
- Kim Soo-yong
- Park Yong-shik as Prof. Kim Yong-gun's friend
- Im Sung-hoon
- Hwang Shin-hye
- Lee Seung-yun
- Jung Jae-gon as Jung Jae-gon
- Im Won-hee as Im Won-hee
- Seo Yoo-jung
- Heo Jae
- Jun Kwang-ryul as Acupuncturist
- Park Hyung-sun
- Kim Se-ah
- Kwon Min-joong as Kwon Min-joong
- Lee Kyung-shil as Lee Kyung-shil
- Oh Jung-hae
- Lee Ah-hyun
- Uhm Ji-won
- Choi Ji-na
- Yu Seo-jin
- Yoon Jung-soo
- Kim Ga-yun
- Choi Soo-rin as Choi Jung-mi
- Kim Jung-nan
- Lee Hyun-kyung
- Im Ho
- Bae Do-hwan
- Go Soo-hee
- Park Shi-eun as Park Shi-eun
- Chae Min-hee
- Yang Taek-jo
- Shin Shin-ae
- Hong Seung-wook
- Lee Yoon-sung
- Son So-young
- Myung Ro-jin
- Kim Chul-sung
- Lee Sung-min
- Jo Won-joon
- Kim Shin-il
- In Gyo-jin
- Jung So-young
- Park Woong
- Choi Ho-joong
- Im Ji-eun
- Kim Sun-kyum
- Park Kyu-jum
- Park Joon-gyu
- Shin Eun-jung
- Kim Jung-kyun
- Son Min-woo
- Lee Sang-chul
- Choi Young-jae
- Oh Kyung-soo
- Park Seung-chan
- Im Dae-ho
- Lee Shi-eun
- Kim So-won
- Kim Bok-hee
- Yoo Myung-soon
- Park Joong-hoon
- Baek Jong-hun
- Kim Chul-ki
- Han Tae-i
- Park Jong-sul
- Kim Ki-hyun
- Kim Dong-soo
- Jo Jae-hyuk
- Kim Sun-young
- You Na-young
- Seo Kwon-soon
- Park Hyung-sun
- Son Yoo-kyung
- Lee Hye-geun
- Go Yong-hwa
