= Downfall (1997 film) =

- Film poster
- Hangul: 창
- Hanja: 娼
- RR: Chang
- MR: Ch'ang
- Directed by: Im Kwon-taek
- Written by: Im Kwon-taek; Kim Dae-seung
- Produced by: Lee Tae-won
- Starring: Shin Eun-kyung; Han Jung-hyun; Choi Dong-joon
- Cinematography: Chun Jo-myuong
- Edited by: Park Soon-duk
- Music by: Kim Soo-chul
- Production company: Taehung Pictures
- Release date: September 13, 1997 (South Korea)
- Running time: 105 minutes
- Country: South Korea
- Language: Korean

Downfall (Korean: 창; RR: Chang) is a 1997 South Korean film by Im Kwon-taek on the history of Korea's modern sex industry. The story revolves around an orphan girl who is tricked into prostitution and finds love with one of her clients, but she cannot break free of the pimps and procurers exploiting her.

== Cast ==
- Shin Eun-kyung
- Han Jung-hyun
- Choi Dong-joon
- Chung Kyung-soon
- An Byung-kyung
- Bang Eun-mi
- Oh Jee-hye
- Kim Dong-soo
- Park Sang-myun
- Kim Sung-ryong
- Yoon Yoo-sun
