= White Lie (TV series) =

2008–2009 South Korean television series

- Promotional poster
- Also known as: White Lies
- Genre: Family; Romance; Melodrama; Revenge
- Written by: Jo Eun-jung
- Directed by: Bae Han-chun; Lee Min-soo
- Starring: Shin Eun-kyung; Kim Hae-sook; Kim Yu-seok; Kim Tae-hyun; Im Ji-eun
- Country of origin: South Korea
- Original language: Korean
- No. of episodes: 179

Production
- Executive producer: Lee Dae-young
- Producer: Jeongho Kim
- Running time: 30 minutes

Original release
- Network: MBC; MBC Dramanet; MBC ON
- Release: November 10, 2008 – July 17, 2009

White Lie (Korean: 하얀 거짓말; RR: Hayan geojinmal) is a South Korean television series starring Shin Eun-kyung, Kim Hae-sook, Kim Yu-seok, Kim Tae-hyun and Im Ji-eun. The morning daily drama aired on MBC on Mondays to Fridays at 7:50 a.m. from November 10, 2008, to July 17, 2009, for 179 episodes.

White Lie recorded ratings of over 20% — unusually popular for a morning show. It was also shortlisted for Best Telenovela at the International Emmys.

== Plot ==
Seo Eun-young (Shin Eun-kyung) is happily engaged to marry Kang Jung-woo (Kim Yu-seok) until he suddenly dumps her to marry a rich woman, Hong Na-kyung (Im Ji-eun). Eun-young, alone and pregnant, is left behind as her ex-fiancé and his new bride go abroad. Managing to get a job as a nurse at a hospital, she supports herself while five years go by.

Meanwhile, one of her patients, Kang Hyung-woo (Kim Tae-hyun) falls in love with her and wholeheartedly pursues her. With Hyung-woo's wealthy mother Madam Shin, a department store owner, in support of the match, Eun-young has no reason to refuse him beyond her memories of Jung-woo. But then Jung-woo suddenly returns, and Eun-young discovers that Hyung-woo is his half-brother. Hyung-woo is autistic, and with Eun-young, he is able to express himself and open his mind to the world. And though Eun-young initially marries him for money and revenge, with time she starts to genuinely love Hyung-woo.

== Cast ==
Seo family

- Shin Eun-kyung as Seo Eun-young
- Yoon Hye-kyung as Seo Bo-young (sister)
- Ahn Suk-hwan as Seo Heo-gu (father)
- Kim Hye-ok as Na Jin-sun (mother)

Kang family

- Kim Yu-seok as Kang Jung-woo
- Im Ji-eun as Hong Na-kyung (Jung-woo's wife)
- Kim Young-ran as Joo Ae-sook (Jung-woo's birth mother)

Madam Shin's family

- Kim Tae-hyun as Kang Hyung-woo (Jung-woo's half brother)
- Jung Yoon-jo as Kang Shin-woo (Jung-woo's half sister)
- Kim Hae-sook as Shin Jung-wook, or Madam Shin (Hyung-woo and Shin-woo's mother)

Extended cast

- Kim Jin as Joo Hong-jin
- Jung Hee-tae as Ahn Bi-seo
- Lee Eun-soo as Hwang Bi-an
- Kang Suk-jung as Cha Min-jae (photographer)
- Ha Ji-young as Ms. Han
- Song Ji-eun as Song Yeon-hee (Madam Shin's new housekeeper)
- Seol Ji-yoon as Lawyer Kang
- Min Joon-hyun as doctor
- Seo Dong-hyun as Bi-an's friend
- Han Young-kwang
- Heo Tae-hee

== International Broadcast ==
- The series has been aired in 2012 in the Philippines via TV5, airing weekday afternoons at 2:45pm.
- The series has been aired since 2021 in the United States via MBC Drama America, airing weeknights at 10:20PM (EST).

== See also ==
- Munhwa Broadcasting Corporation
- List of South Korean television series
