= My Wife Is a Gangster 2 =

My Wife Is a Gangster 2: The Return Fable
- Poster for My Wife is a Gangster 2
- Hangul: 조폭 마누라 2: 돌아온 전설
- Hanja: 組暴 마누라 2: 돌아온 傳說
- RR: Jopok manura 2: doraon jeonseol
- MR: Chop'ok manura 2: toraon chŏnsŏl
- Directed by: Jeong Heung-sun
- Written by: Choi Hae-cheol
- Produced by: Lee Sun-yeol
- Starring: Shin Eun-kyung; Park Jun-gyu; Jang Se-jin
- Cinematography: Jo Dong-gwan
- Edited by: Ko Im-pyo
- Music by: Park Jeong-hyeon
- Distributed by: CJ Entertainment
- Release date: September 5, 2003
- Running time: 110 minutes
- Country: South Korea
- Language: Korean

My Wife Is a Gangster 2: The Return Fable (Korean: 조폭 마누라 2 - 돌아온 전설) is a 2003 South Korean action comedy film. It is the sequel to My Wife Is a Gangster and is itself followed by My Wife Is a Gangster 3.

== Plot ==
In the beginning of the movie the Scissor gang are fighting some unknown gang on the rooftop. The other gang starts to get the upper hand and are about to kill Robocop but he is saved by Eun-jin (Shin Eun-kyung), the Scissor gang's boss also known as 'Silverfish'. However, during the fight she falls from the top of the building. Due to a lucky break, the fall doesn't kill her, but it does cause her to suffer amnesia. Luckily for Eun-jin, she's found by Choi Yoon-jae (Park Jun-gyu), the kindly owner of a small-scale Chinese restaurant. She worked as a delivery girl under the name of Tsu Tsu. She tries several times to regain her memory but fails in each attempt.

During one of her deliveries, she happens to be at the bank which is being put under heist when one of the robber starts kicking a pregnant woman. Regaining a part of her memory about she getting kicked by Nanman, she then beats up all three of the robbers and prevents the bank robbery.

Meanwhile, the White Shark from the earlier movie along with his several henchmen has survived the fire and have returned to the neighborhood. He plans to demolish the buildings from the neighborhood of Yoon-jae's restaurant and build a big mall there, but he happens to see Eun-jin as she is being awarded for her bravery of preventing a bank robbery. He inquires about her and learns from a local hoodlum that she is working as a delivery girl. He asks the hoodlum to make an order so that they may get to know her. But when she appears with the delivery he immediately recognizes her as the 'Silverfish' and hires Jun-man, brother of Nanman, to kill her.

Once, in a feud with Ji-hyun, Tsu Tsu fell from the roof and recovered her past memories with White Shark, who had recruited Jun-man to kill her. Jun-man became impotent when Yoon-jae's motorbike accidentally hit him in the groin. Ji-hyun was later kidnapped by the White Shark gang and they call Yoon-jae and threaten him to sell his daughter to brothel if he doesn't tell them about Eun-jin's whereabouts. When Eun-jin hears of these events she goes to save Ji-hyun but while she was being rescued by Eun-jin, Yoon-jae gets stabbed in the stomach and killed. Eun-jin was saved by the 132-members of the Scissor gang. Ji-hyun later joined Eun-jin's gang to fight against some Chinese illegal drug dealers. Zhang Ziyi appears in cameo in a short fight scene at the end of the film.

== Cast ==
- Shin Eun-kyung as Cha Eun-jin
- Park Jun-gyu as Yun Jae-cheol
- Jang Se-jin
- Ryu Hyun-kyung
- Joo Hyun
- Jo Mi-ryung
- Choi Joon-yong
- Kim Seung-wook
- Kim Tae-hoon
- Shim Won-cheol
- Lee Ki-yeol
- Kim Gyung-ae
- Jo Sun-mook
- Byun Joo-yun
- Sunwoo Sun
- Kim Kyung-ryong
- Go Gwan-jae
- Oh Sang-hoon
- Lee In-ok
- Kim Tae-ok
- Hong Soo-ah
- Hong Seung-il
- Kim Jin-yang
- Choi Hae-cheol

Guest appearance

- Kim Young-ho
- Lee Won-jong
- Choi Eun-joo
- Ryu Shi-hyun
- Choi Wang-soon
