= Love to Hate You (TV series) =

2023 South Korean television series

- Promotional poster
- Hangul: 연애대전
- Hanja: 戀愛大戰
- Lit.: Love Battle
- RR: Yeonaedaejeon
- MR: Yŏnaedaejŏn
- Genre: Romantic comedy
- Written by: Choi Soo-young
- Directed by: Kim Jung-kwon
- Starring: Kim Ok-vin; Teo Yoo; Kim Ji-hoon; Go Won-hee
- Music by: Howl
- Country of origin: South Korea
- Original language: Korean
- No. of episodes: 10

Production
- Producers: Kim Dong-hyeon; Jeon Gyu-ah
- Editor: Lee Yeong-rim
- Running time: 44–63 minutes
- Production company: Binge Works

Original release
- Network: Netflix
- Release: February 10, 2023

Love to Hate You (Korean: 연애대전) is a 2023 South Korean romantic comedy television series written by Choi Soo-young, directed by Kim Jung-kwon, and starring Kim Ok-vin, Teo Yoo, Kim Ji-hoon and Go Won-hee. It was released on Netflix on February 10, 2023.

== Synopsis ==
Yeo Mi-ran (Kim Ok-vin) is a free-spirited lawyer with a strong interest in social justice, especially when it relates to women. She enjoys sex, but has a low opinion of men and is not afraid to use her martial arts skills to beat up the bad guys. A change of circumstances forces her to take up a job in a big male-dominated law firm which specialises in sorting out celebrities' scandals. One of its clients is Nam Kang-ho (Teo Yoo), a big star of romantic movies who has an aversion to women. Mi-ran overhears Kang-ho making angry misogynistic remarks about women labeling them as nothing more than gold diggers and she adds him to her personal database of jerks. She has a hunch that he's up to no good with a schoolgirl and schemes to get close to him to find evidence exposing his nefarious deeds and bring him down...

== Cast ==
=== Main ===
- Kim Ok-vin as Yeo Mi-ran, a new lawyer at Gilmu, an entertainment law firm
- Teo Yoo as Nam Kang-ho, Korea's top actor
- Kim Ji-hoon as Do Won-jun, who gave up his dream of becoming an actor to start a management business and guided Nam Kang-ho's career
- Go Won-hee as Shin Na-eun, Yeo Mi-ran's housemate and close friend

=== Supporting ===
- Lee Joo-bin as Oh Se-na, Nam Kang-ho's first love, who is called "the nation's first love"
- Kim Sung-ryung as Choi Soo-jin
- Song Ji-woo as Hwang Ji-ye, a rookie actress acting alongside Nam Kang-ho
- Han Seo-jun as Yoon Sang-seop, a manager of Nam Kang-ho
- Choi Yoon-so as Grace
- Jeon Shin-hwan as Lee Jin-seo, Yeo Mi-ran's ex-boyfriend
- Kim Ye-ryeong as Kim Eun-hee, Mi-ran's and Dae-jun's mother
- Kim Do-yeon as drama series director
- Jo Seung-hee as Kim Ji-woo
- Tak Aeon as a stuntman

=== Special appearance ===
- Song Jae-hee as passenger on the plane (ep.5)
- Hong Woo-jin as Yeo Dae-jun (ep.8)
- Yeon Jung-hoon as celebrity (ep.9)
- Eugene as celebrity (ep.9-10)
- Lee Yu-ri as celebrity (ep.9-10)

== Production ==
On November 4, 2021, Netflix announced their new series Love to Hate You with Kim Ok-vin as Yeo Mi-ran, an entertainment lawyer, and Teo Yoo as Nam Kang-ho, Korea's top actor, who hates dating. The series would be directed by Kim Jung-kwon, written by Choi Soo-young, and produced by Binge Works, a subsidiary of Studio S.

This series marks the reunion of Kim Ji-hoon and Lee Joo-bin after working together in Money Heist: Korea – Joint Economic Area.

== Episodes ==
No.	Title	Original release date
1	"Bad Girl"	February 10, 2023
2	"Bad Boy"	February 10, 2023
3	"Nice Guys Get a Pass Bad Boys Have It Coming"	February 10, 2023
4	"You Are Not What I Expected"	February 10, 2023
5	"Love is Just an Experiment, Life is the Real Thing"	February 10, 2023
6	"Femme Fatale vs Homme Fatale"	February 10, 2023
7	"Trigonometry: The Love Triangle Edition"	February 10, 2023
8	"The Way You Change Me"	February 10, 2023
9	"You Made Me Who I Am"	February 10, 2023
10	"A Passionate Goodbye"	February 10, 2023

== Release ==
The series premiered on Netflix on February 10, 2023, and was available for streaming worldwide.

== Original soundtrack ==
=== Part 1 ===
Released on February 6, 2023
No.	Title	Lyrics	Music	Artist	Length
1.	"Sweet Dream"	Howl	Park Geun-cheol; Jeong Su-min	Miyeon and Yuqi ((G)I-dle)	3:39
2.	"Sweet Dream" (Inst.)		Park Geun-cheol; Jeong Su-min		3:39
Total length:					7:18

=== Part 2 ===
Released on February 9, 2023
No.	Title	Lyrics	Music	Artist	Length
1.	"Lovey Dovey"	Howl	Park Geun-cheol; Jeong Su-min	Taeil (NCT)	3:24
2.	"Lovey Dovey" (Inst.)		Park Geun-cheol; Jeong Su-min		3:24
Total length:					6:48

=== Part 3 ===
Released on February 13, 2023
No.	Title	Lyrics	Music	Artist	Length
1.	"Love to Hate You" (그러니까 하고 싶은 내 말은)	Big Naughty; Dani	Big Naughty; Dani; Park Geun-cheol; Jeong Su-min	Big Naughty	3:20
2.	"Love to Hate You" (그러니까 하고 싶은 내 말은; Inst.)		Big Naughty; Dani; Park Geun-cheol; Jeong Su-min		3:20
Total length:					6:40

=== Part 4 ===
Released on February 16, 2023
No.	Title	Lyrics	Music	Artist	Length
1.	"The Moment" (너를 만난 순간)	Howl	Park Geun-cheol; Jeong Su-min	Lily and Sullyoon (Nmixx)	3:11
2.	"The Moment" (너를 만난 순간; Inst.)		Park Geun-cheol; Jeong Su-min		3:11
Total length:					6:22

== Reception ==
On the review aggregator website Rotten Tomatoes, 80% of 5 critics' reviews are positive, with an average rating of 7/10.

Reviewer Joel Keller of Decider wrote, "The plot of Love To Hate You is definitely contrived, but the story of Mi-ran and the performance of Kim Ok-vin makes the series very watchable."
