= Kim Jung-kwon =

South Korean filmmaker (born 1969)

Kim Jung-Kwon
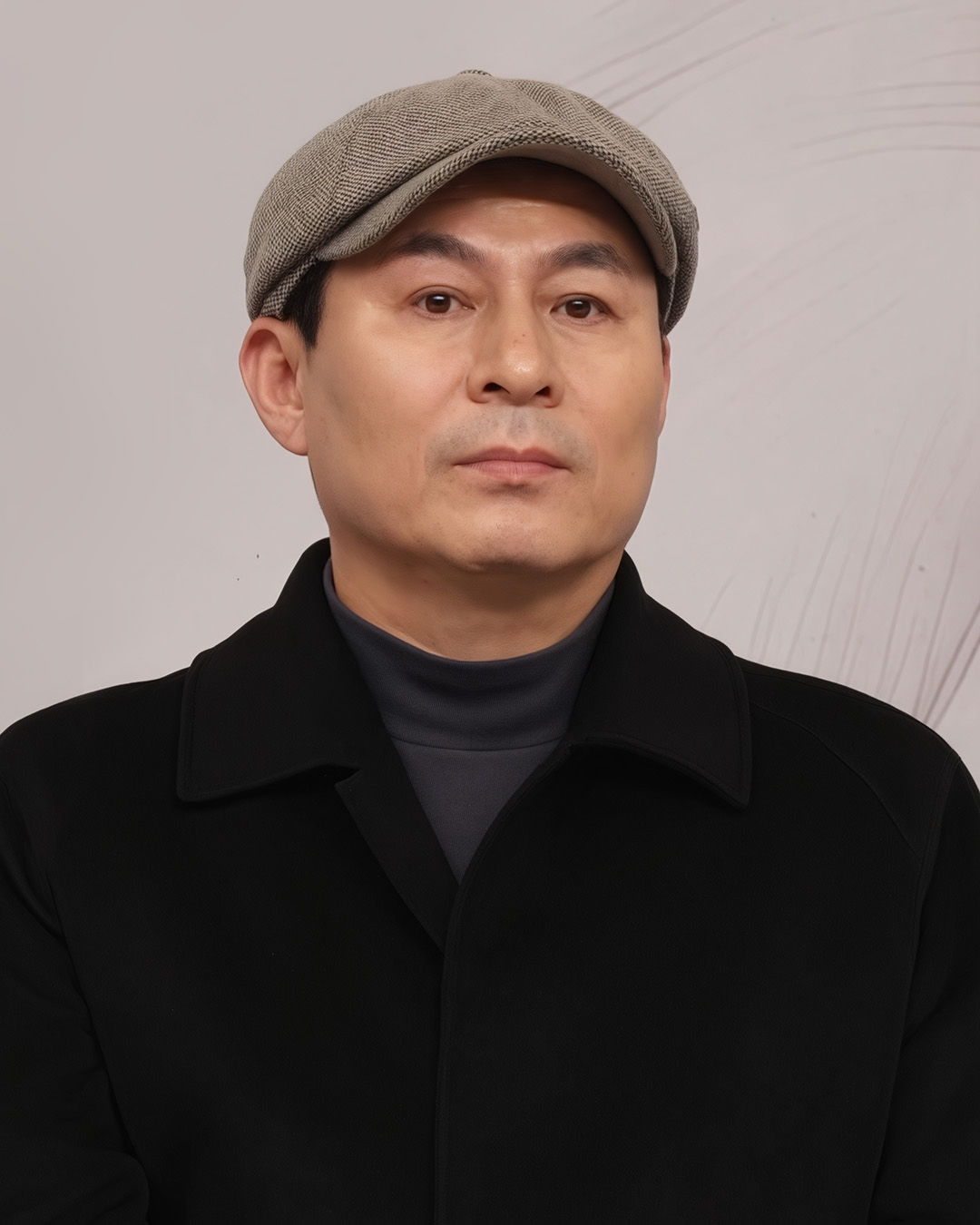
- Born: July 7, 1969 (age 57); South Korea
- Education: Seoul Institute of the Arts
- Occupations: Film director, screenwriter
- Years active: 2000–present

Korean name
- Hangul: 김정권
- Hanja: 金正權
- RR: Gim Jeonggwon
- MR: Kim Chŏnggwŏn

Kim Jung-Kwon (Korean: 김정권; born July 7, 1969) is a South Korean film director and screenwriter. He made his directorial debut with the film Ditto (2000), which earned him the Best New Director award at the Chunsa Film Art Awards. Following his successful debut, his other notable works include Miracle of a Giving Fool (2008), Lie After Lie (2020), Love to Hate You (2023), and Maestra: Strings of Truth (2023–2024).

== Filmography ==
- Ivan the Mercenary (1997) - assistant director
- Sky Doctor (1997) - assistant director
- The Happenings (1998) - assistant director
- The Spy (1999) - assistant director
- Ditto (2000) - director, script editor
- A Man Who Went to Mars (aka A Letter From Mars) (2003) - director, writer
- BA:BO (2008) - director, screenwriter
- Heartbreak Library (2008) - director, planner
- Autumn Story (short film) (2009) - director, scripter
- Snow in Sea Breeze (2015) - director, screenwriter
- Lie After Lie (2020) - director
- Love to Hate You (2023) - director
- Maestra: Strings of Truth (2023–2024) - director
- No Tail to Tell (2026) - director

== Awards ==
- 2000 8th Chunsa Film Art Awards: Best New Director (Ditto)
