= Shin Shin-ae =

South Korean actor (born 1959)

- 신신애
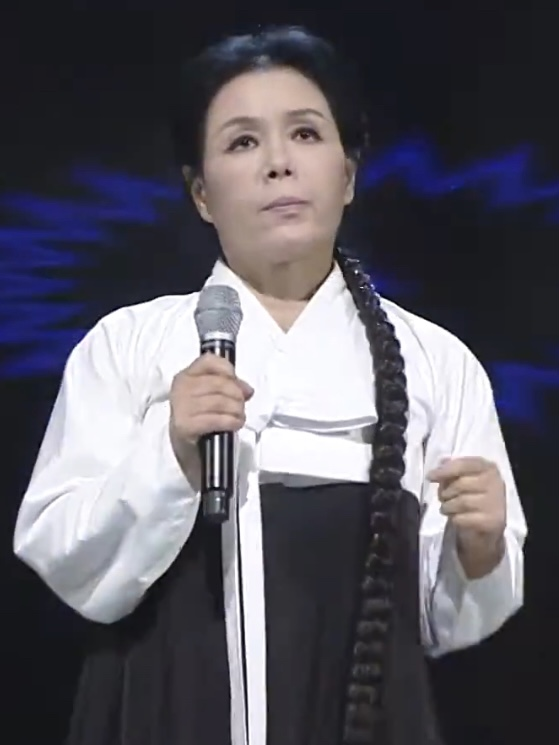
- Shin in 2018
- Born: August 22, 1959 (age 67); Sunchang County, South Korea
- Other name: Shin Geum-mae
- Education: Korea University - Bachelor of Nursing
- Occupations: Actress; singer
- Years active: 1977–present

Korean name
- Hangul: 신신애
- Hanja: 申信愛
- RR: Sin Sinae
- MR: Sin Sinae

Shin Shin-ae (Korean: 신신애; born June 3, 1959) is a South Korean actress and trot singer. She is best known for her roles in popular South Korean television series such as Hometown Cha-Cha-Cha and Lost.

Shin reached the height of her music career as a singer in the 1990s with the hit song "The World is a Wonderful World." Due to the lyrical content of her music, she is frequently referred to as the "Queen of Satire Songs." In the 2020s, she has expanded her public profile by working as an advocate for the elderly.

== Early life and education ==
Shin Shin-ae was born on June 3, 1959, in Sunchang County, North Jeolla Province, South Korea. She enrolled in the Department of Nursing at Korea University. After graduation, she worked as a nurse at Hyehwa Hospital, the predecessor of Korea University Anam Hospital, for about two years.

== Career ==
=== Career as an actress ===
Shin debuted in the entertainment industry in 1977 after passing the MBC 9th Open Recruitment Talent audition.Despite this early start, she continued to work as a professional nurse for several years before transitioning fully into acting.

Her first public appearance following her debut was as an assistant host for the MBC program Scholarship Quiz. During the initial phase of her career, she performed under the stage name Shin Geum-mae (Korean: 신금매; Hanja: 申錦梅). Her final project using this pseudonym was the 1986 MBC drama Birthday Hand. Later that same year, she began using her birth name, Shin Shin-ae, while starring as Mrs. Cheon in the drama Winter Flower.

Shin's breakthrough occurred in 1990 with her role as Park Bok-nyeo in the MBC Drama Yeombanggakha. Her portrayal of the character earned her the 1990 MBC Actor Choice Award for Best Actress. The same year, she made her film debut in Ghost Baseball Team. This was followed in 1992 by another movie, Romance Emperor (1992).

=== Career as a singer ===
Shin's musical career began in the spring of 1993 after she portrayed Bong-chan in the KBS2 miniseries Hope. The role required her to perform numerous trot songs, prompting record producer and singer Kim Soo-hee to encourage Shin to record a studio album. The lead single, "The World is a Wonderful World," featuring lyrics written by Shin, became a nationwide success. This triggered a cultural trend often referred to as the "Shin Shin-ae craze." Following the song's success, she starred in a film of the same name.

"The World Is a Wonderful World" reached the top tiers of major music programs, peaking at third on KBS2's Music Top 10 and fourth on MBC's Decision! Popular Songs. Her performance, characterized by an expressionless delivery and the "Lee-pan-sa-pan" dance, was considered a unique phenomenon during an era dominated by pop acts like Seo Taiji and Boys. For her work that year, she received the Grand Prize at the 1993 MBC All-Star Music Festival.

Music historian Jang Yu-jeong, a professor at Dankook University's College of Liberal Arts, noted that the song is a modern adaptation of two 1930s tracks by Kim Jung-gu. While based primarily on the 1939 song "The World is a Wonderful World," it also incorporates modified lyrics from the 1938 track "Anchhwa Storm." Due to this stylistic lineage, the Encyclopedia of Korean Culture identifies Shin, alongside Kim Jung-gu, as a representative of Manyo: a genre of satirical or comic songs that originated during the Japanese colonial period.

In 1994, Shin released "Money, Money, Money-Money," a satirical trot song. Although it did not replicate the massive success of her debut, it remained a significant hit. While she focused primarily on music throughout the 1990s, she effectively paused her singing career in 2003 following the release of the album Amusement Song to return to acting.

After a 14 year hiatus from the music industry, Shin returned in 2017 with the album Yonggungga. The title track, based on the Korean folk tale Byeoljujeon, utilizes satire to critique the exploitation of the weak by those in power. On January 13, 2018, she was honored in the popular song development category at the Proud Korean People Awards held at the National Assembly Hall.

Shin experienced a resurgence in public interest in 2020 following her appearance on the Lunar New Year Trot Special of JTBC's Two Yoo Project Sugar Man (Season 3, Episode 8). Her performance of "The World is a Wonderful World" led to further media engagements, including an appearance on the MBC variety show Radio Star.

=== Other activities ===
In 2020, Shin participated in "My Job-Happy Tomorrow," the third installment of the "We Together Campaign" sponsored by the Ministry of Culture, Sports, and Tourism. This initiative focuses on fostering intergenerational empathy and addressing the challenges of an aging society. As a job ambassador for seniors, Shin visited various workplaces to experience the labor conditions of elderly workers firsthand, documenting these experiences to raise public awareness.

The campaign’s broader objectives include addressing low fertility rates, promoting joint parenting, and improving communication between different age groups. In December 2020, the Minister of Culture, Sports, and Tourism presented Shin with a formal commendation. This award recognized her efforts in publicizing employment information for the elderly and her contributions to shifting social perceptions regarding South Korea's aging population.

== Personal life ==
Shin has remained single throughout her life, citing a personal philosophy that individuals enter and depart from the world alone. She was the primary caregiver for her mother, who suffered from diabetes and pancreatic cancer until her death. In recognition of her dedicated care, the Mayor of Seoul presented Shin with a filial piety award in 2005.

== Filmography ==
=== Film ===
Year	Title	Role	Note	Ref.
1978	Outing after 5 years	A wealthy real estate speculator	Cultural film	
1979	Dad's Merry-go-round	In-sook's mother	Main Character in Savings Enlightenment Film	
1979	Chul-i's Gift	Young-i's mother	cultural film	
1984	Happy Holidays	Lee Bu-in (Deputy Chief Han's wife)	cultural film	
1990	Ghost Baseball Team	Han Soo's mother	Main character	
1993	Emperor of Romance	Heo Mal-bun		
1997	Push! Push!	Park Shin-ae (head nurse)		
1999	The Harmonium in My Memory	Sangju-daek		
2000	Black Honeymoon	Kwon Jeong-geum		
2001	One Fine Spring Day	aunt		
2001	My Wife Is a Gangster	Marriage Counseling Director		
2007	Happiness	The director of a nursing home	special appearance	
2009	Closer to Heaven	Jin Hee-mo		
2012	The Ugly Duckling	Shin Shin-ae (the head nurse)	special appearance	
2012	Space Insurance King	Kim Yeo-seon	Main character	
2016	The Last Princess	Hangeul School Principal	Special Appearance	
2017	Two Light:Relumino	Kyung-a	Short Film	
2019	Extreme Job	3rd floor aunt	Special Appearance	
2020	Gukdo Theater	Ki-tae's mother	Main character	
2021	What Happened to Mr. Cha?	Bok-soon		
2022	Stellar: A Magical Ride	Dongsik's mother		
2022	Life Is Beautiful	Aunt Dong-tan	Special appearance	

=== Television drama series ===
Year	Title	Role	Network	Ref.
1977	Investigation Team Leader: "Evidence"	Jang Hee-suk	MBC	
1977	113 Investigation Headquarters	Nurse	MBC	
1977	MBC The 3rd Class: "Oil Flower"	Deputy Chief of Staff	MBC	
1977	Jeonghwa	gisaeng	MBC	
1977	Wife	female employee	MBC	
1977	You	Nurse	MBC	
1977	Why is that	Nurse	MBC	
1977	Oknyeo	Aran	MBC	
1978	X Reconnaissance Team		MBC	
1978	South Wind Flower	shop girl	MBC	
1978	Smile	Mun-gi's mother	MBC	
1978	113 Investigation Headquarters: "Stairway to Heaven"	wife	MBC	
1978	113 Investigation Headquarters: "Bird and Rat"	Choi Min-ja	MBC	
1978	MBC The 3rd Class: "Blue Mountains"	Ahjumma of the hole shop	MBC	
1979	The Last Witness		MBC	
1979	Investigation Team Leader: "Handle"	Mi-soon	MBC	
1979	Becoming a Mountain, Becoming a River	Dabang Reji	MBC	
1980	Hongsa Chorong	Staff	MBC	
1980	Investigation Team Leader: "Suspect"	Wife	MBC	
1980	Investigation Team Leader: "Box 6"	Nurse	MBC	
1980	Frugal Family	Saedak	MBC	
1980	Royal Diary		MBC	
1981	Investigation Team Leader: "Informant"	Love In (Gyeongsil)	MBC	
1981	Winners and Losers	Daughter-in-law	MBC	
1981	Gyodong Madame Suwondae		MBC	
1981	Women's Enthusiasm Series: "Jang Hee-bin"	Yoo Sang-gung	MBC	
1982	National Customs Rate		MBC	
1982	Hundred-year-old Geek's Son-in-law'	So-Nang-Ja		
1982	Investigation Team Leader: "Finding People"	Gilja	MBC	
1982	Women's Enthusiasm Series: "Mama Seo-gung"	Yoon Sang-gung	MBC	
1982	Annals of Rejection Series: "Baeksan Ahn Heejee"	Bunrye	MBC	
1982	Investigation Team Leader: "Duel of Shaolin Temple"	Aspiring writer	MBC	
1982	Park Soon-kyung, The Drunkard	wife	MBC	
1982	We'll Awaken the Dawn	Yang, wife of Heung-soo, a conservative in Ttukbang Village	MBC	
1982	Naraya	Young-ok	MBC	
1983	Legendary Night Story: "Yeonyeonyeon"	Satou's wife, Mrs. Kim	MBC	
1983	25 Poems of Ambition	Kim Yang-sook	MBC	
1983	The Market People: "Finding the Groom"	Kim Jeom-rye	MBC	
1983	The Market People: "The Poor People"	poor woman Kim	MBC	
1983	Teacher Tiger		MBC	
1983	Cool Special Midnight Footprints	Crazy Country Maiden		
1983	Eom Bok-dong	Eom Bok-dong's wife Choi Soon-i	MBC	
1983	Amhaengeosa		MBC	
1983	The Dumb	eldest daughter		
1983	Amhaengeosa: "Gongmyeongcheop"	Do Gaek-ju's wife	MBC	
1983	Gannani	Old virgin saint	MBC	
1984	Teacher Tiger: "Problem Drama Series Moving Classroom, We Are Here"	Teacher couple	MBC	
1984	MBC Best Seller Theater: "Looking for a Woman"	Country girl Chil-rye	MBC	
1984	Spray	Jin-sook	MBC	
1985	Gaet Village	Dangjindaek, wife of a fishing village chief	MBC	
1985	Pampas Grass – Park Pan-do	Lee Jang's wife	MBC	
1986	Birthday Hand	Kongkongi	MBC	
1986	MBC Best Seller Theater: "Celebrity"	Madame	MBC	
1986	Dalgung	Daughter Gmani	MBC	
1986	Winter Flower	Mrs. Cheon	MBC	
1987	Investigation Team Leader: "A Pair of Gloves"	Song Jeong-ja	MBC	
1987	MBC Best Seller Theater: "Fragrance of Chestnut Flowers"	Stepmother	MBC	
1988	Investigation Team Leader: "Divorce Uprising"	Hwasuni's mother	MBC	
1988	Haeho	North Korean female moderator	MBC	
1988	My Age and Turi	Yang Ran-i's mother	MBC	
1989	Encounter Meeting	Seed Concubine	MBC	
1989	Armband	Seungpil's mother	MBC	
1989	Investigation Team Leader: "Have You Seen the Fairy"	Ji-Young, the wife of a security guard	MBC	
1989	My Friend Angel	Geum Joo	MBC	
1990	Yeombanggakha	Park Bok-nyeo	MBC	
1990	My Mother	Inok	MBC	
1991	Park Ok-ju	MBC		
1991	Brother	Hammer wife Geumsandaek	KBS2	
1992	MBC Best Theater: "Living in a Cottage by the Railroad"	Jo Young-sook	MBC	
1992	Taepyeong Cheonha	Counseling Director	MBC	
1992	Three Families Under One Roof: "Why Do You Look at the Dots"	Mi-sook	MBC	
1992	Biryuncho	Chae Geum-Hwa	SBS	
1992	Bandy's House	Oh Jong-ji	SBS	
1993	Hope	Aunt Pongjjak	KBS2	
1993	Han River Cuckoo	Jeong Chun-mae	SBS	
1994	Magpie	Lee Kyung-ok	SBS	
1994	KBS Drama Game: "Pear Flower"	Mr. Park	KBS2	
1995	Seogung	Mae Hong	KBS2	
1996	KBS Drama Game: "There is a Crucian Carp in Bungeoppang"	Saeteodak	KBS2	
1996	Scent of Apple Blossom	Seo Jeong-ran	MBC	
1997	KBS Drama Game: "Pup-Duck Mother and Hong Gil-Dong"	Pup-Duck Mother/Hye-Ran (1 person, 2 roles)	KBS2	
1997	MBC Best Theater: "Spring and Snow Is Ridiculous"	Mokpo House	MBC	
1997	Spring Day Goes	Jeon Jeon	KBS2	
1997	MBC Best Theater: "This Happens"	Son Hee-suk	MBC	
1997	The Mistress	Bulne	KBS2	
1997	Beyond the Horizon	Kwak Seo-Woon	SBS	
1998	For Love	Jung Eun-mi	MBC	
1999	Crystal	Bae Geum-ja	SBS	
1999	KBS Sunday Best	Paper Flower	KBS2	
2000	The Gibbs Family	Chief Nurse Cha Sook-ja	MBC	
2000	Dukyi	Seoul House Ahjumma	SBS	
2001	Hotelier	Shin Geum-soon	MBC	
2002	MBC Best Theater: "The Pied Piper"	Shin Jeong-suk	MBC	
2003	Drama City: "Crime-Free Village"	Seok Gu-ne	KBS2	
2004	Jang Gil-san	Jukjip Grandmother	SBS	
2004	The Age of Heroes	In-gyu's mother	MBC	
2004	Second Proposal	Heeja	KBS2	
2005	KBS TV Literary Museum: "Showers"	Yangpyeong-daek	KBS1	
2005	Drama City: "Remodeling is Barefoot"	Lee Jang-daek	KBS2	
2007	Bad Woman, Good Woman	Gwi-ok	MBC	
2007	Air City	Go Eun-ah	MBC	
2007	Catch up with Gangnam Mom	Senior Kitchen Senior	SBS	
2007	Drama City: "The Song of an Old Chick"	Yeongcheondaek	KBS2	
2008	Lawyer of Great Republic of Korea	a real estate agent	MBC	
2009	Siru Island	Shaman Lim	CBS	
2010	Giant	Inn's hostess	SBS	
2011	Romance Town	Kim Soon-ok	KBS2	
2014	There Are Blue Birds	Lee Sang-hee	TV Chosun	
2014	The Most Beautiful Thing in the World	Sandongnee Auntie	MBC	
2019	Everything is Kungdari	Hong Ja-ya	MBC	
2021	Hometown Cha-Cha-Cha	Park Sook-ja		
2021	Lost	Book Min-ja	JTBC	

=== Television Sitcom ===
Year	Title	Role	Note	Ref.
2000	Three Friends	Park Sang-myeon as Stalker	MBC	

== Stage ==
=== Theater ===
Year	Title	Role	Ref.
1979	The Sergeant of Maengjinsa's house	Pretty-yi	
1985	Valley of Death	Deborah	
1987	These People	Worker's wife	
1998	Prosecutor and Female Teacher	female teacher	
2008	MBC Madangnori-Student Confidentiality	aunt	

== Discography ==
=== Album ===
List of Albums(s)
Year	Production		Released Date	Ref.
Year	English Title	Original Title	Released Date	Ref.
1993	The World is a Wonderful World, Trot Medley	세상은 요지경	1993-08-10	
1995	Ppongjjak's medley 1	뽕짝네 메들리 1	1995-05-30	
1994	People, money, money, money, money	사람아, 돈아 돈아 돈 돈	1994-03-01	
2001	Shin Shin-ae 2002 Best	신신애 2002 Best	2001-07-20	
2003	Amusement Song	오락가락	2003-06-01	
2017	Yonggungga	용궁가	2017-03-10	
2020	Let's Live with a Smile	웃으며 살자	2020-10-20	
2022	What Age	나이가 웬수다	2022-02-10	

== Ambassadorship and advertisement ==
=== Ambassadorship ===
Year	Description
1999	Hanam International Environment Expo Organizing Committee Public Relations Member
2006	People Helping Small Business Success Member
2007	Rose Association (Good People of Saenuri) Cooperation Ambassador
2015	Joyple Love Ambassador
2017	Korea Pediatric Diabetes Association PR ambassador
2017	BGN Bright Eyes Ophthalmic Blind Prevention Ambassador

== Awards ==
=== Acting ===
List of award(s)
Award ceremony	Year	Category	Nominee	Result	Ref.
MBC Actor's Choice	1990	Actor Award	Shin Shin-ae	Won	
Korea New Generation Culture and Arts	2004	Best Acting Award	Shin Shin-ae	Won	
Korea Press Association World Luxury Brand Grand Prize	2016	Luxury Acting Grand Prize	Shin Shin-ae	Won	

=== Music ===
List of award(s)
Award ceremony	Year	Category	Nominee	Result	Ref.
MBC "All-Star Song Festival"	1993	Grand Prize	The World is a Wonderful World	Won	
Korean Culture and Arts Newspaper	2016	Korea's Best Grand Prize, Talent Category, Grand Prize	Shin Shin-ae	Won	
Korea Entertainment Arts Awards	2017	Exemplary Singer Award	Yonggungga	Won	
Song Writer's Day hosted by the Korea Music Writers (Lyricist, Composer) Association	2017	Singer Achievement Award	Yonggungga	Won	
The 24th Republic of Korea Entertainment and Arts Awards	2018	Ye General Assembly President Award	Yonggungga	Won	
12th Song Writer's Day Korea Forced Writers (Lyricist, Composer) Association "Special Singer Award"	2018	Special Singer Award	Yonggungga	Won	
The 2018 Proud Korean People Awards Singer and Talent Korea Press Association	2018	Popular Music Development Contribution Award	Shin Shin-ae	Won	
The 20th Korea Culture and Arts Awards	2019	Ten Singer Grand Prize	Shin Shin-ae	Won	

=== Culture ===
List of award(s)
Award ceremony	Year	Category	Nominee	Result	Ref.
SBS Comedy Joint	1996	Grand Prize	Shin Shin-ae (as Nam Joo-na from Learning)	Won	
Korea's Best Grand Prize, Talent Category, Grand Prize (Korean Culture and Arts Newspaper)	2004	Grand Prize	Shin Shin-ae	Won	
The 33rd Mother's Day	2005	Seoul Mayor's Filial Person Award	Shin Shin-ae	Won	
The 2018 Korea Humanity Award	2018	Humanity Award	Shin Shin-ae	Won	
Minister of Culture, Sports and Tourism Award	2020	Minister of Culture, Sports and Tourism Award	Shin Shin-ae	Won	
