= My Wife Is a Gangster =

2001 film by Jo Jin-kyu

- Theatrical poster
- Hangul: 조폭 마누라
- Hanja: 組暴 마누라
- RR: Jopok manura
- MR: Chop'ok manura
- Directed by: Jo Jin-kyu
- Written by: Kang Hyo-jin; Kim Moon-sung
- Produced by: Suh Se-won; Park Mi-jeong; Lee Soon-yeol
- Starring: Shin Eun-kyung; Park Sang-myun; Ahn Jae-mo; Kim In-kwon
- Cinematography: Yang Hee-man; Jeon Jo-myeong
- Edited by: Park Gok-ji
- Music by: Jang Dae-seong
- Production companies: Hyun Jin Films; Korea Pictures; Suh Se-Won Production Co. Ltd.
- Release date: September 27, 2001
- Running time: 107 minutes
- Country: South Korea
- Language: Korean
- Box office: $26.4 million

My Wife Is a Gangster (Korean: 조폭 마누라) is a 2001 South Korean action romantic comedy film directed by Jo Jin-kyu and written by Kang Hyo-jin and Kim Moon-sung. A sequel titled My Wife Is a Gangster 2 was released in 2003, with a third film (My Wife Is a Gangster 3) released in 2006.

== Plot ==
Eun-jin is separated from her older sister Yu-jin when they were kids at an orphanage. While growing up, Eun-jin becomes a Kkangpae gangster and adopts the nickname "Mantis". Upon discovering that Yu-jin is suffering from cancer, Eun-jin demands the doctors to perform an operation, but they refuse. The dying Yu-jin tells Eun-jin to marry as soon as possible, where Eun-jin goes on a blind date under the advice of her underling Romeo, who invited a stylist to design the appropriate makeup for Eun-jin. However, the date becomes a disaster and Romeo is sent to find someone more suitable.

While Eun-jin is smashing up a car in retaliation against two men, a man ran up to protect her, but was accidentally hit in the head by Eun-jin. The man named Kang Soo-il is simple and kind-hearted. He seems perfect for Eun-jin and later marries her. Yu-jin spoke to Eun-jin about her desire to have children and Eun-jin sets out to get pregnant. She forces her husband into several occasions of sexual intercourse. While Eun-jin is out for a meal with her group, she is approached by a man from a rival gang called White Sharks. He is asked to leave after he had a drink from Eun-jin, but still lingered. Annoyed, she stabs him in the head, barely missing his eyes. The next day, there is a meeting between Eun-jin and the White Sharks and a showdown is arranged between Eun-jin and Nanman.

Eun-jin and Nanman fought fiercely. It seemed that Nanman had the upper hand after stabbing Eun-jin. As he is about to finish her off, Eun-jin moves out the way and Nanman fell down a cliff. Nanman manages to climb back up and tries to strangle Eun-jin. Eun-jin finds a way to escape and stomps on Nanman's groin after she stabs the ground right next to his face, refusing to kill him. Soo-il eventually finds that Eun-jin was a gangster after seeing her tattoo on her back and wanted her to give it up. Eun-jin discovers that she was pregnant and told Yu-jin. Later, Yu-jin dies in front of Eun-jin after telling Eun-jin that her baby deserves a father.

Later, Romeo dies in the arms of Sherry after being stabbed by five street punks. Sherry uses the public telephone to call Andy that Romeo has been stabbed. Andy mistakenly believes it was Nanman and the White Sharks who killed Romeo and set out to take revenge on them. Upon arriving at the White Sharks' warehouse, Andy and the rest of his group discovers that they were heavily outnumbered. The pregnant Eun-jin went out to fight the gangsters, but suffered a miscarriage after suffering a vicious attack by Nanman. Eun-jin tells Nanman to stop kicking her in the belly as she was pregnant. Nanman then revealed that he has become a eunuch after his earlier showdown with Eun-jin.

As Nanman is about to stab Eun-jin, her boss turns up and pleads the White Shark to spare her life in exchange for some documents. Soo-il finds out that Eun-jin is pregnant, where he takes revenge on White Shark by dousing the gang and him with kerosene. As he is holding up the lighter, Soo-il is restrained. The White Shark foolishly ignites himself, along with 64 other men, when attempting to light his cigarette. Soo-il becomes the leader alongside Eun-jin, who is starting a showdown with another gang leader.

== Title ==
The title, 조폭 마누라, is pronounced Jopok Manura. 조폭 (jopok) is a Sino-Korean word: 組暴. The first character, 組, is pronounced "jo" in Korean, and refers to a group, gang, or organization. The second character, 暴, is pronounced "Pok" (or sometimes Po) in Korean, and refers to violence and cruelty. The word itself, 조폭, connotes organized crime such as the Mafia, as opposed to random thuggery, and this explains some of the references to "professionalism" in the film.

The second word of the title, 마누라, is pronounced manura. This word means wife, with local flavor. There are at least two other words in Korean, 아내 (a-nay) and 집사람 (jipsaram), that can be used by a man to refer to his own wife in a deferential but respectful way. An approximate translation in American English would be "the old Lady".

The complete title, Jopok Manura, thus epitomizes the central paradox of the film. It is probably best translated as "Gangster Wife". The heroine, Eun-jin, is a respected professional (jopok) in the world of organized crime, but a romantic (manura) in the world of traditional Korean gender relations.

The paradox is resolved when Soo-il takes vengeance on his wife's enemies by dousing them with kerosene. When he ultimately appears as his wife's second in the film's final showdown, the conflict between their social roles is resolved. At the end, both are outlaws in terms of legal acceptability, but they have become a legitimate married couple in the context of their referential peer group, the gangster underworld.

== Cast ==
- Shin Eun-kyung as Cha Eun-jin
- Park Sang-myun as Kang Su-il
- Lee Eung-kyung as Yu-jin
- Kim In-kwon as Banse
- Ahn Jae-mo as Bada
- Jang Se-jin as Baek sang-eo
- Choi Min-soo
- Eun-ju Choi
- Kim In-mun as Oden Food
- Yeon Jung-hoon as Hyo-min
- Gye-nam Myeong as Boss
- Shin Shin-ae as Marriage Centre Consultant

== Reception ==
It was the fourth highest-grossing film for the year in Korea with 1.46 million admissions. It grossed $26.4 million worldwide.

== See also ==
- James Bond, a 2015 Indian Telugu-language remake of My Wife Is a Gangster (2001)
- Singh is Bling, a 2015 Indian Hindi-language remake of My Wife Is a Gangster 3 (2006)
