= Park Sang-myun =

South Korean actor

- Born: January 27, 1968 (age 58); Seoul, South Korea
- Education: Seoul Institute of the Arts – Theater
- Occupation: Actor
- Years active: 1988–present
- Agent: Imagine Asia

Korean name
- Hangul: 박상면
- Hanja: 朴相勉
- RR: Bak Sangmyeon
- MR: Pak Sangmyŏn

Park Sang-myun (Korean: 박상면; born January 27, 1968) is a South Korean actor. He is best known for his comic roles, notably in My Wife Is a Gangster (2001).

== Career ==
Park Sang-myun graduated in 1987 with a Theater degree from Seoul Institute of the Arts. He made his acting debut in 1993 in a Korean staging of the musical Guys and Dolls. Park first broke into the film industry with minor roles such as "Ashtray" in the hit 1997 comedy No. 3, but his strong acting talent soon captured the attention of audiences and filmmakers. His first major success came in 2000 via the wrestling comedy The Foul King, followed by a memorable role in firefighting drama Libera Me. Park's TV sitcom Three Friends further cemented his popularity as a character actor, and he became a common sight on TV programs and advertisements as well as on film.

In late 2001, Park scored his biggest hit with the comedy My Wife Is a Gangster, which attracted over 5 million viewers nationwide. As the "straight man," he played a mild-mannered government clerk who doesn't realize that his wife is a fearsome gang boss. Hi! Dharma!, released a couple months later, also became a runaway hit with audiences for its comic showdown between gangsters and Buddhist monks.

The year 2002 was less kind, however, with comedies Can't Live Without Robbery and Baby Alone both bombing at the box-office, effectively ending Park's career as a leading actor. Since then, he returned to supporting roles, in television dramas such as Seoul 1945 (2006) and Bread, Love and Dreams (2010).

Aside from his prolific film and TV career, Park also appears in small-scale stage plays and musicals, notably How Are You, Sister? about a soldier and a nun who meet during the Korean War (in Kim Sang-jin's debut as a theatre director), and Really Really Like You, a 1970s-set nostalgic romance between an English teacher and a high school baseball coach (adapted from the same-titled 1977 film).

== Filmography ==
=== Film ===
Year	Title	Role
1996	Boss	
1997	The Rocket Was Launched	
1997	No. 3	Jae-cheol ("Ashtray")
1997	Downfall	
1998	Two Cops 3	Underling 1
1999	Dr. K	Park Ho-dong
1999	A Growing Business	Chef
1999	Nowhere to Hide	Jjang-gu (cameo)
2000	The Foul King	Tae Baek-san
2000	Just Do It!	Shim Chung-eon
2000	Libera Me	Park Han-mu
2001	The Humanist	Amoeba
2001	My Wife Is a Gangster	Kang Su-il
2001	Hi! Dharma!	Bul-kom ("Brown Bear")
2002	A Perfect Match	Kim Hyo-jin's client (cameo)
2002	Can't Live Without Robbery	Kang Sang-tae
2002	Baby Alone	Man-su
2003	Silver Knife	Man next door (cameo)
2005	She's on Duty	Homeroom teacher (cameo)
2005	Never to Lose	Police captain (cameo)
2007	A Good Day to Have an Affair	Dew's husband (cameo)
2007	Mission Possible: Kidnapping Granny K	Ahn Jae-do
2007	The Mafia, the Salesman	Daegari ("Ox head")
2010	Attack the Gas Station 2	Mang-chi
2013	Miracle in Cell No. 7	Ppabaki ("Bar-eyed") (cameo)
2014	Mr. Perfect	Lee Byung-joo's father

=== Television series ===
Year	Title	Role
1999	The Boss	Hippo
2000	Three Friends	Park Sang-myun
2000	Bad Friends	Hong Joo-gon
2001	Her House	Kim Dae-woong
2001	Lovers	Sang-myun
2002	Shoot for the Stars	Han Ba-da
2003	All In	Im Dae-chi
2003	Detective	
2004	More Beautiful Than a Flower	Park Young-min
2004	Into the Storm	Ahn Dong-soo
2005	Green Rose	Lee Choon-bok
2006	The King of Head-butts	Kim Cheol-seok
2006	Seoul 1945	Park Chang-joo
2006	Look Back with a Smile	Lee Sang-myun
2007	Moon Hee	Kim Young-chul
2007	Urban Legends Deja Vu 2	Storyteller
2008	Our Happy Ending	Kang Joong-ki
2008	My Lady Boss, My Hero	Kim Sang-joong
2008	Love Marriage	Company president Ryu
2009	Three Men	Park Sang-myun
2010	Give Me Your Memory ~ Pygmalion's Love	Minerva
2010	Bread, Love and Dreams	Yang In-mok
2010	Marry Me, Mary!	Wi Dae-han
2011	Color of Women	Park Woo-chul
2012	History of a Salaryman	Jin Ho-hae
2012	Feast of the Gods	Im Do-shik
2012	12 Signs of Love	Dong-gun
2012	Suspicious Family	Chun Eok-man
2012	Lovers of Haeundae	Boo Young-do
2012	Ohlala Couple	Trainer (cameo)
2013	KBS Drama Special – "Glass Bandage"	Seo Kyeong-do
2014	Wife Scandal – The Wind Rises	Husband
2014	Into the Flames	Park Jong-yeol
2014	Triangle	Sabuk gangster boss
2014	Healer	Chae Chi-soo
2016	Sweet Stranger and Me	Bae Byung-woo
2020	Zombie Detective	Lee Gwang-sik
2021	The Penthouse: War in Life	Bang Chi-soon (cameo, season 3 episode 1)
2021	Dali & Cocky Prince	Ahn Sang-tae (cameo)

=== Web series ===
Year	Title	Role	Ref.
2021	The Birth of a Nation	Kwak Sung-wook	

=== Variety show ===
Year	Title	Notes/Ref.
2008	Star King	Panelist, episodes 66, 68-69
2012	The Duet	Contestant (with Lee Haeri)
2012	Roller Coaster - Season 2	
2012	E-King	MC
2012	Law of the Jungle W - Season 3	Cast member
2013	Treasure Island	MC

== Theater ==
Year	Title	Role
2000	Guys and Dolls	
2003	속 불효자는 웁니다	
2006	How Are You, Sister?	
2008	Really Really Like You	Coach Gu
2009	The Thing About Men	
2009	Really Really Like You	Coach Gu
2013	Tomorrow Morning	Jack

== Awards and nominations ==
Year	Award	Category	Nominated work	Result
1999	20th Blue Dragon Film Awards	Best Supporting Actor	A Growing Business	Nominated
2000	21st Blue Dragon Film Awards	Best Supporting Actor	The Foul King	Nominated
2000	MBC Drama Awards	Favorite Character Actor of the Year, Viewer's Choice	The Boss	Won
2001	MBC Entertainment Awards	Special Talent Award	Bad Friends	Won
2006	KBS Drama Awards	Best Supporting Actor	Seoul 1945	Won
2008	SBS Entertainment Awards	Best Entertainer	Star King	Won
2010	18th Korean Culture and Entertainment Awards	Acting Award for TV	Bread, Love and Dreams	Won
2010	KBS Drama Awards	Best Supporting Actor	Mary Stayed Out All Night, Bread, Love and Dreams	Nominated
