= Jo Jin-kyu =

South Korean film director (born 1960)

- Born: 1960 (age 65–66); South Korea
- Occupations: Film director television director

Korean name
- Hangul: 조진규
- RR: Jo Jingyu
- MR: Cho Chin'gyu

Jo Jin-kyu (Korean: 조진규; born 1960) is a South Korean film director. Jo's directorial debut was the hit gangster comedy My Wife Is a Gangster (2001). He returned to the series with My Wife Is a Gangster 3 in 2006. In 2016, he directed a joint Korean-Chinese film Sweet Sixteen (2016) starring Joo Won.

== Filmography ==
=== Film ===
- Agada (1984) - script editor
- Good Morning, Ms. President (1989) - assistant director
- My Wife Is a Gangster (2001) - director
- Who's Got the Tape? (2004) - director
- My Wife Is a Gangster 3 (2006) - director
- Man on the Edge (2013) - director, executive producer
- Sweet Sixteen (2016) - director

=== Television ===
- Bolder By the Day (MBN, 2011–2012)
