= Diary of June =

- Directed by: Im Kyeong-soo
- Written by: Go Jeong-woon
- Produced by: Choe Hyeon-sik; Jo Won-jang
- Starring: Shin Eun-kyung; Yunjin Kim; Eric Mun
- Cinematography: Kim Cheol-ju
- Edited by: Kyung Min-ho
- Distributed by: Showbox
- Release date: December 1, 2005
- Running time: 105 minutes
- Country: South Korea
- Language: Korean
- Box office: US$3,867,958

Diary of June (Korean: 6월의 일기; RR: Yuwolui ilgi; also known as Bystanders) is a 2005 South Korean mystery thriller film starring Shin Eun-kyung, Yunjin Kim and Eric Mun. The film was released to South Korean cinemas December 1st, 2005 where it received a total of 697,980 admissions nationwide.

== Plot ==
Two boys from the same school are murdered. In their stomachs, are capsules containing scraps from a diary that describes the next victims. Suspecting the possibility that a killer is at the same school, detective Chu Ja-young (Shin Eun-kyung), with her rookie partner Kim Dong-wook (Eric Mun) search the school to find identical handwriting that matches that of the diary excerpts. When they finally find the matching one, they're told that Jin-mo, the student who wrote the text, had already died in a car accident one month ago. As Ja-young and Dong-wook discover Jin-mo's secret diary, more clues are revealed concerning the next victim. They also discover that Jin-mo was bullied by his schoolmates, and that there is a darker secret to be revealed.

== Cast ==
- Shin Eun-kyung as Chu Ja-young
- Yunjin Kim as Seo Yoon-hee
- Eric Mun as Kim Dong-wook
- Yoon Joo-sang as Squad leader Yang
- Maeng Se-chang as Jang Joon-ha
- Kim Kkot-bi as young Yoon-hee
- Park Hyun-young as Dong-wook's friend
- Oh Jung-se as pickpocket
- Kim Ji-min as Choi Hae-joon
- Yoo Hyun-ji as sesame leaves girl
- Jang Ki-bum as nobleman
