= Nikki S. Lee =

Korean visual artist (born 1970)

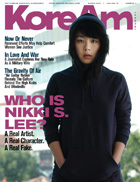
- On the March 2007 cover of KoreAm
- Born: Lee Seung-hee; 1970 (age 55–56); Geochang County, South Gyeongsang Province, South Korea
- Citizenship: United States
- Education: Chung-Ang University (BFA); Fashion Institute of Technology; New York University (MA)
- Occupation: Photographer
- Spouse: Teo Yoo (m. 2007)
- Awards: The Louis Comfort Tiffany Foundation Award; 2001 The Louis Comfort Tiffany Foundation

Korean name
- Hangul: 이승희
- RR: I Seunghui
- MR: I Sŭnghŭi

Lee Seung-hee (Korean: 이승희; born 1970), known professionally as Nikki S. Lee, is a South Korean visual artist with a focus on performance, photography, and film. Lee often explores themes of identity through her work — specifically as it relates to others, rather than individual identity. Her photography series Projects (1997–2001) is her first and most notable work, where she camouflages herself as a member of the social and ethnic groups she poses with. Lee now lives and works in Seoul, South Korea.

== Early life and education ==
Lee was born in Geochang (거창군), South Korea. During her childhood, Lee was exposed to a variety of foreign cultures through American media. She developed an interest in learning about various cultures and their people. However, because she knew it was difficult for a woman artist to gain recognition––and because she didn't think it was particularly "cool"––she was hesitant to pursue a career in art. Lee wanted to pursue an acting career instead, but decided not to due to insecurities about her physical appearance. She also wanted to be a filmmaker, but her parents didn't want her to attend cinema school. Lee thought she might get around that by going to school for photography, which her parents did accept.

Lee earned a Bachelor of Fine Arts in photography at Chung-Ang University (중앙대학교) in South Korea in 1993. After a year, she moved to New York City to study commercial photography at the Fashion Institute of Technology. Lee completed this program in 1996, receiving an Associate in Applied Science. She subsequently earned her Master of Arts in photography at New York University (NYU) in 1999. During her first year at NYU, she nearly quit because it was so technical and documentary focused. She disliked that she had to go out to the streets and take photographs because she did not like "bothering people". In the years after, however, she became interested in the conceptual aspect of photography.

Lee chose her "American" name, 'Nikki' after she moved to America in 1994. She asked a friend of hers to compile a list of American sounding names for her to choose from. It was not until much later that Lee found out that her friend had made the list from that month's edition of Vogue, and that "Nikki", came from the model Niki Taylor.

== Work ==
In Lee's early career, she started as a photo assistant for the LaChapelle Studio. She carried lighting, helped set up the studio, and loaded film as an intern. Although she enjoyed working for commercial photography, she was drawn to make "something of [her] own", as she had desired when she was a child. She quit her job in the fashion world and began to focus on her own work.

=== Projects, 1997–2001 ===
Lee's most noted series of work, Projects (1997–2001), began as a graduation requirement. Photographs were of herself with twelve groups of people, as published in the photobook with the same title: Projects. They were titled according to the subculture she transformed herself to appear as: The Punk Project (1997), The Tourist Project (1997), The Young Japanese (East Village) Project (1997), The Lesbian Project (1997), The Hispanic Project (1998), The Yuppie Project (1998), The Swingers Project (1998–99), The Seniors Project (1999), The Ohio Project (1999), The Exotic Dancers Project (2000), The Skateboarders Project (2000), and The Schoolgirls Project (2000). Additional projects not included in this publication were The Drag Queen Project (1997), and The Hip-Hop Project (2001).

In preparation for each project, Lee would select a subculture, research it, and adopt the clothing, customs, and mannerisms of the group to fully integrate herself. She would try out many types of makeup, hairstyles, and multicolored contact lenses. Then, she either got her clothes from various thrift stores or places that people of the subculture she wanted to pose as frequented. For The Seniors Project, where Lee had to appear as an older woman, she had to get her makeup done professionally instead of doing the look herself––as she had done with all her other projects. Some projects required a specific skill: for The Skateboarders Project Lee had to learn how to skateboard, and for The Exotic Dancers Project she dieted and trained for three months with a personal trainer. After three or more months of developing the identity, Lee would ask a person to take a picture of her with the group.

The use of an automatic camera for all of the photographs in Projects provided Lee with a red timestamp, which captured the moment when the picture was taken. As Lee herself was in the photos, she had her friends take them. She has said that the use of this type of camera made people around her more comfortable because they were used to seeing and/or using it. Though it was a lower quality camera, that did not really matter to Lee; she was more focused on investigating notions of identity and the uses of vernacular photography, instead of creating beautiful pictures.

The use of snapshot photography, which refers to a "shot" taken very spontaneously, helped her truly become one with the group to the perspective of the audience. Especially as Lee believed that individual personalities are fluid and that her exploration of other identities were simply extensions of themselves, this unprepared nature of photography perfectly encapsulated how each and every group was simply her own reality.

Lee was open with her intentions as an artist, that she was an artist, as she went through this process, but not all of them believed her. Some of the seniors depicted in The Senior Project did not believe that Lee was actually a young woman under her old lady disguise.

While Lee's projects appear completely unique from one another, there is a common thread among all of the subcultures she portrays. One such is that each of the groups she chose to create an identity has a distinctive look that functions as a connection between the members of their community. Lee's projects highlight her underlying concept of how other people make her a certain kind of person and the influence of inner relationships on the idea of identity.

Since the 1990s, Lee has spoken often about her motivations behind her work. She has emphasized the importance of group identity and social performance in Asia, as opposed to the more personal sense of identity in the US. In an interview with curator RoseLee Goldberg published in 2006, she stated: "Western culture is very much about the individual, while Eastern culture is more about identity in the context of society. You simply cannot think of yourself out of context."

Due to the cultural stereotypes that her transformations utilize, Lee's work in Projects has received criticism of cultural appropriation and blackface. Furthermore, critics have argued that her style of interpretive authorship is rather a representation of authoritarian power over the identity of other subcultures.

=== Parts, 2002-2005 ===
Lee began her Parts (2002–5) series during the fall of 2002, in London. The inspiration behind it emerged from thoughts she had as she was working on her Projects series. Her various identities in those projects drew out men of equal variety and it made her think about the way identity changes within romantic relationships. For Parts, Lee created stories around each of the heterosexual couples she depicted.

In each photograph, Lee plays the role of the woman, posing in different settings with a man––a romantic partner. However, every image is cropped to make it impossible to directly see who she is with, leaving only a trace of the man, such as an arm or a foot. This cropping directs the viewer's focus to the woman but evokes curiosity about the partner.

When asked about the cropping, Lee said that it was not supposed to be reminiscent of a break-up; how one might cut their ex out of every photo of them together. Instead, the cropping was an aesthetic, and it was meant to make the viewer curious about the part which was missing and how the parts missing alter the person who is still pictured.

One of the series included in Parts, called The Wedding Series was commissioned by The Jewish Museum. The work was part of one of the museum's exhibitions titled The Jewish Identity Project: New American Photography. It was open from September 23, 2005 to January 29, 2006.

=== a.k.a. Nikki S. Lee (2006) ===
In 2006, Lee released the film, A.K.A. Nikki S. Lee. The project, described as a "conceptual documentary", alternates segments presenting Lee as two distinct personalities, one a reserved academic and another an outgoing socialite. It had its premiere at the Museum of Modern Art in New York, October 5–7, 2006. The film appears to be a true Nikki documentary, a young woman who is serious about making a second documentary about herself. Nikki No. 2, an impulsive personality, flaunts in the photo. Lee explained in an interview, "Nikki number one should be Nikki, and Nikki number two should be fake. But both are Nikki fake."

Through this work, she aims to point out the interesting concept of showing reality and non-reality at the same time, what is acting and what is not. Lee decided on making a documentary, or a fake documentary, because she felt that it was the best medium to convey the concepts and common themes of her work.

=== Layers (2008) ===
One of her most recent works is Layers (2008), which is a series of photographs that show layers of the portraits she collected from 14 different cities, across various parts of the world. Lee provided tracing paper to each of the street artists she asked to draw her portrait, so that she would be able to later layer them together on top of a light box. She only layered three sketches at a time––three from each city she visited––put them together with the lightbox and took a picture of the resulting mix. The purpose of this project was to find out how people from different cities and of different ethnicities would perceive Lee and her features. With this project, Lee asserts that everyone has complex, multilayered personalities, in which any small parts can be viewed by others of different ethnicities.

=== Other Work ===
During her career, Lee's only work for commercial magazines was with BlackBook and The New York Times Magazine. Lee collaborated with BlackBook on the theme of bourgeois, creating photographs of herself and her companion as a bourgeois couple. This series was titled The Bourgeoisie and was later published, along with Paris––a series where various couples are depicted in Paris, with Lee as the focus––from Lee's Parts series.

== Personal life ==
In 2007, Lee married actor Teo Yoo.

== Awards ==
- 2001: The Louis Comfort Tiffany Foundation Award from The Louis Comfort Tiffany Foundation

== Collections ==
Lee's work is held in the following permanent collections:

- Museum of Contemporary Art, Los Angeles
- Museum of Contemporary Photography, Chicago
- Hirshhorn Museum and Sculpture Garden, Washington, D.C.
- International Center of Photography, New York
- Solomon R. Guggenheim Museum, New York: 5 prints (as of 10 April 2023)
- Fukuoka Asian Art Museum, Japan
- National Museum of Women in the Arts, Washington, D.C.
- Indianapolis Museum of Art, Indianapolis
- Kemper Museum of Contemporary Art, Kansas City
- University of Michigan Museum of Art, Ann Arbor
- Harvard Art Museums, Cambridge
- Museum of Fine Arts, Houston
- Metropolitan Museum of Art, New York City
- San Francisco Museum of Modern Art
- Princeton University Art Museum, Princeton

== General references ==
- Coles, Alex (2000). Site-Specificity: The Ethnographic Turn. London: Black Dog Publishing. pp. 74–91.
