= Ha Ji-young =

South Korean actress (born 1982)

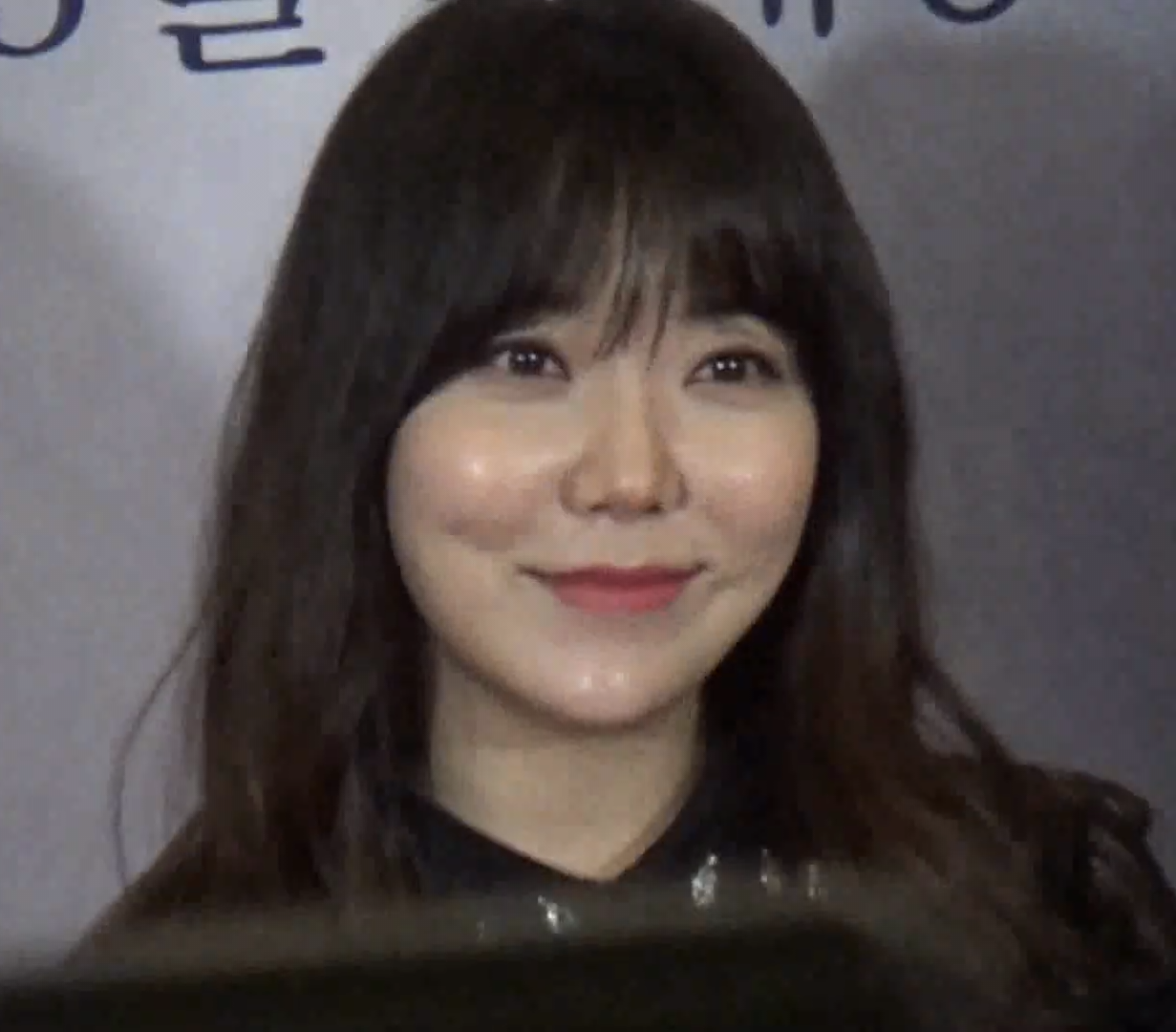
- Ha in May 2018
- Born: Seo Ji-young; 4 December 1982 (age 43); Daegu, South Korea
- Other names: Seo Ji-young, Ha Jiyoung
- Education: Seoil University
- Occupations: Actress; model
- Years active: 2003–present
- Agent: A9 Media
- Known for: Divorce Lawyer in Love; White Lie; You Call It Passion

Ha Ji-young is a South Korean actress and model. She made her acting debut in the 2003 on KBS 18th Public Bond Comedy. She is known for her roles in Divorce Lawyer in Love, You Call It Passion and The Legend.

== Filmography ==
=== Television ===
Year	Title	Role	Ref.
2008	White Lie	Ms.Han	
2009	The Legend	Personal writer	
2014	Sing Again, Hera Gu	Choi	
2015	Divorce Lawyer in Love	Kim Ji	
2015	Hogu's Love	Jung-eun	
2018	Joseon Beauty Pageant	Mi	
2019	The Witch Store	The Witch	
2020	Lie After Lie	Hye-yeong's mom	
2021	Be My Dream Family	Kim Ji-yeon	
2022	Insider	No Seung-hwan's wife	
2023	Maestra: Strings of Truth	Kim Song-yi	

=== Film ===
Year	Title	Role	Language	Ref.
2005	When Romance Meets Destiny	Junior	Korean	
2006	Oh! My God	School affairs division girl	Korean	
2006	A Dirty Carnival	Bookstore employee	Korean	
2006	Holy Daddy	Student	Korean	
2010	Yeouido	Announcer	Korean	
2015	You Call It Passion	SBS Reporter	Korean	
2023	Tales of Nobody	Na-yoon	Korean	
