= Still You =

2012 South Korean television series

- Promotional poster
- Also known as: You're Still the One
- Hangul: 그래도 당신
- Hanja: 그래도 當身
- RR: Geuraedo dangsin
- MR: Kŭraedo tangsin
- Genre: Romance; Melodrama; Family
- Written by: Park Eon-hee; Lee Hyun-jung
- Directed by: Park Kyung-ryul
- Starring: Shin Eun-kyung; Kim Seung-soo; Wang Bit-na; Song Jae-hee
- Country of origin: South Korea
- Original language: Korean
- No. of episodes: 124

Production
- Production location: South Korea
- Running time: 30 minutes on Mondays to Fridays at 19:20 (KST)
- Production companies: Shinyoung E&C Group; SBS Plus

Original release
- Network: Seoul Broadcasting System
- Release: 21 May – 3 December 2012

Still You (Korean: 그래도 당신) is a 2012 South Korean television series starring Shin Eun-kyung, Kim Seung-soo, Wang Bit-na and Song Jae-hee. It aired on SBS from May 21 to December 3, 2012 on Mondays to Fridays at 19:30 for 124 episodes.

== Plot ==
Soon-young divorces her husband, Han-joon legally due to his business troubles, but they carry on having a happy married life. But the "fake divorce" turns real when Han-joon's old flame Chae-rin comes back and offers him her financial assistance in exchange for choosing her. In order to get her husband back, Soon-young tries to make Han-joon jealous by dating his rival Woo-jin. But Soon-young and Woo-jin begin to develop feelings for each other.

== Cast ==
- Shin Eun-kyung as Cha Soon-young
- Kim Seung-soo as Na Han-joon
- Wang Bit-na as Kang Chae-rin
- Song Jae-hee as Kang Woo-jin

Han-joon's family

- Jang Seo-won as Na Doo-joon
- Kim Sung-eun as Shin Na-ra
- Lee Se-na as Na Se-hee
- Yoon Mun-sik as Na Yoo-seok
- Lee Chae-mi as Na Mi-so

Chae-rin's family

- Kim Sung-kyum as Kang Beom-seok
- Park Jung-soo as Kim Yi-hyun
- Lee Eun-jung as Kang Hee-jin

Extended cast

- Lee Deok-hee as Seo Nam-joo
- Yoon Hyun-min as Lee Jae-ha
- Go Myung-hwan as Sung Dong-chul
- Hwang Hyo-eun as Lee Kyung-joo
- Nam Kyung-eub as Baek Hwa-soo
- Jung Ye-ji as Jang Hyun-hee
- Seo Yun-ah as Son Myung-ji
- Jang Ka-hyun
