= Shin Eun-kyung =

South Korean actress

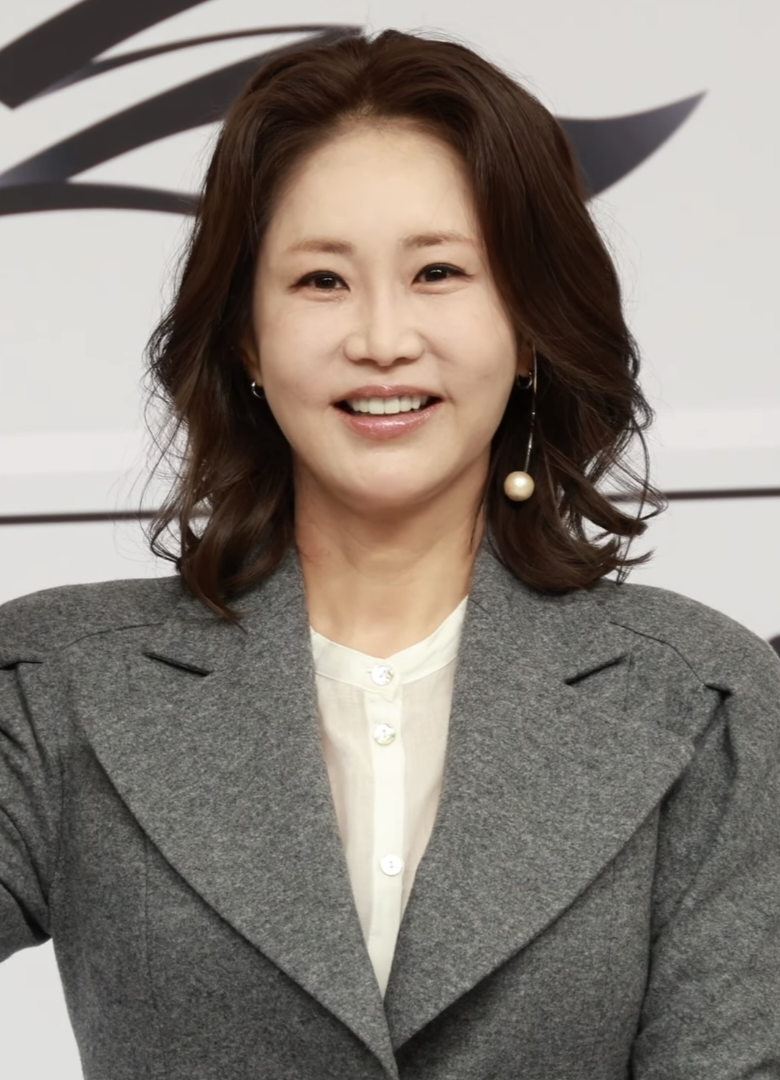
- Shin in March 2024
- Born: 15 February 1973 (age 53); Busan, South Korea
- Education: Dankook University – Theater and Film
- Occupation: Actress
- Years active: 1988–present
- Agent: Run Entertainment
- Spouse: Kim Jung-soo (m. 2003; div. 2007)
- Children: 1

Korean name
- Hangul: 신은경
- Hanja: 申恩慶
- RR: Sin Eungyeong
- MR: Sin Ŭn'gyŏng

Shin Eun-kyung (Korean: 신은경; born 15 February 1973) is a South Korean actress. She is best known for her leading roles in Downfall (1997) and My Wife Is a Gangster (2001). Shin is one of the most prominent Korean actress in the 1990s, alongside Shim Eun-ha, Ko So-young and Jeon Do-yeon, whom she starred with in General Hospital (1994).

== Career ==
Shin began appearing in commercials in 1986 at the age of 13, and made her television debut in 1988 on KBS. Throughout the late eighties and early nineties, she acted in a great number of films and TV dramas (notably in the 2001 medical drama General Hospital), garnering fame for her warm screen presence. In 1997, however, she took on her most daring role as a prostitute in veteran director Im Kwon-taek's Downfall. The film was a box-office success, leading her to star status.

In 1999, she starred in two films, including the Korean-Japanese co-produced horror film The Ring Virus, based on the novel by Koji Suzuki. Her success in this role led to her being cast in a small role for a Japanese film, Uzumaki (also known as Spiral). Around this time, Shin was also working as an MC for a television game show.

In 2002, Shin starred in her most famous role as a tough, female gang boss in My Wife Is a Gangster. The film drew more than 5 million spectators and became a strong hit throughout Asia. She also appeared in the sequel, My Wife Is a Gangster 2, but the film faltered at the box office in 2003. Other roles Shin starred in around this time were as a detective in This Is Law (also known as Out of Justice), as a professional matchmaker in the romantic comedy A Perfect Match, and as a naval officer in the box office bomb Blue.

Shin went on a short hiatus after she married and had a baby, and returned to acting in 2005, starring in films such as Bystanders and Mr. Housewife, and television series such as Bad Couple, Mom's Dead Upset, White Lie, Still You and The Scandal. She gained praise for her impassioned portrayals of ruthless and ambitious women in the 2010 melodrama Flames of Desire and the 2014 revenge thriller The Plan.

== Other activities ==
Shin has been a professor at Seoul Hoseo Art College's Department of Performing Arts since 2011.

== Personal life ==
On 22 September 2003, Shin married Kim Jung-soo, who was then the CEO of her talent agency Good Player Entertainment. The following year, she gave birth to a son, who was later diagnosed with hydrocephalus. On 24 August 2007, Shin filed for divorce when she learned that Kim had used her private seal without her permission to misappropriate ₩400 million (US$424,800) for his business after its merger with Fantom Entertainment and the box office failure of several films he'd produced. In November, Shin sued Kim for forgery of private documents. In a separate case, she was sued by KM Culture, the company from whom Kim had taken a loan which amounted to ₩290 million (US$218,000). On 28 December 2008, the court ruled that Shin was not liable for her ex-husband's debts, stating that although Shin's seal is on the loan contract, Shin had not seen any of the money loaned, had not authorized her seal's use, and is therefore not responsible for the debt.

She again landed in the entertainment headlines in 2011 when she underwent bimaxillary osteotomy surgery (or jaw realignment surgery), reportedly because she felt making her strong jawline "slimmer and more rounded" would give her a "younger, softer, more feminine" look, which would result in more acting roles. Shin later spoke candidly that she regretted having undergone the procedure for pure cosmetic purposes, saying the public should be better informed about the pain and danger associated with the invasive surgery. In 2012, she sued an oriental medicine clinic for violating her portrait rights and privacy after it posted false ads on the internet without her permission, featuring her photo and treatment process; she had gone to the clinic to decrease the swelling of her face, a side effect of her jaw reconstruction surgery, but the clinic's treatments proved ineffective. The court ruled in Shin's favor and awarded her damages amounting to ₩35 million.

== Filmography ==
=== Film ===
Year	Title	Role
1989	Kuro Arirang	Sook-hee
1990	This Is the Beginning of Love	Hyeon-im
1991	The Lover on the Bicycle	
1992	Life Isn't a Multiple Choice Test	Min Cho-hee
1993	No Emergency Exit	
1994	Love on a Rainy Day	Peng Young-mi
1994	The Young Man	Jae-yi
1997	Downfall	Eun-young
1998	A Mystery of the Cube	Shin Tae-kyung
1999	The Ring Virus	Hong Sun-joo
2000	Uzumaki	Chie Maruyama
2000	General Hospital the Movie: A Thousand Days	Kang Eun-soo
2001	My Wife Is a Gangster	Cha Eun-jin
2001	This Is Law	Kang Min-joo
2002	A Perfect Match	Kim Hyo-jin
2002	Baby Alone	
2003	Blue	Kang Su-jin
2003	My Wife Is a Gangster 2	Cha Eun-jin
2005	Mr. Housewife	Go Soo-hee
2005	Diary of June	Chu Ja-young
2010	Love, In Between	Han So-young
2013	Born to Sing	Moon Bo-ri's mother
2014	The Plan	Se-hee
2020	Shiho	Su-jeong
2022	It's Alright	TVING Shorts Film

=== Television series ===
Year	Title	Role	Network
1988	Door of Desire		KBS1
1990	What the Women Live		MBC
1990	Pacheonmu	Queen Jeongsun	KBS2
1991	Thief's Wife		KBS2
1991	Velvet Grass of the Old Days		KBS2
1992	Self-Portrait in Black		KBS2
1993	January		KBS2
1993	Pilot	Do Jin-sook	MBC
1994	The Last Match	Kim Soo-jin	MBC
1994	General Hospital	Lee Jung-hwa	MBC
1995	Yeo (Woman)	Yong-seol	MBC
1996	Salted Mackerel	Yoo Young-woo	MBC
1998	Song of the Wind	Jung Sun-joo	SBS
1999	Wave	Lee Ok-jeom	SBS
2007	Bad Couple	Kim Dang-ja	SBS
2008	Mom's Dead Upset	Na Young-su	KBS2
2008	White Lie	Seo Eun-young	MBC
2010	Flames of Desire	Yoon Na-young	MBC
2012	Still You	Cha Soon-young/ Baek In-ah	SBS
2013	The Scandal	Yoon Hwa-young	MBC
2013	Your Neighbor's Wife	Hong Kyung-joo	jTBC
2014	Wife Scandal: "The Wind Rises"	Wife (episode 1: "Lie")	TV Chosun
2014	Family Secret	Han Jung-yeon	tvN
2015	Oh My Ghost	Jo Hye-young	tvN
2015	The Time We Were Not in Love	Gu Yeon-jung	SBS
2015	The Village: Achiara's Secret	Yoon Ji-sook	SBS
2017			SBS
2017	Drama Special: "Bad Families"	Park Myung-hwa	KBS
2018	The Last Empress	Empress Kang	SBS
2020–2021	The Penthouse: War in Life	Kang Ma-ri	SBS
2023–2024	The Escape of the Seven	Cha Joo-ran	SBS

=== Variety shows ===
Year	Title	Notes
1997	Beautiful Morning with Shin Eun-kyung and Kim Chang-wan	Host
1999	Creating a Better World	
2011–2012	She and Him	
2014	A Man Who Satisfies 99 Women	Host

=== Music video appearances ===
Year	Song title	Artist
2001	"Fixing My Makeup"	Wax
2002	"Ace of Sorrow"	Jo Sung-mo
2005	"Smile Again"	KCM

== Awards and nominations ==
Year	Award	Category	Nominated work	Result
1994	TV Journal Star of the Year Awards	Excellence Award, TV Acting category	General Hospital	Won
1994	MBC Drama Awards	Excellence Award, Actress	General Hospital	Won
1995	31st Baeksang Arts Awards	Best New Actress (TV)	General Hospital	Won
1997	18th Blue Dragon Film Awards	Best Leading Actress	Downfall	Won
1997	18th Blue Dragon Film Awards	Popular Star Award	Downfall	Won
1998	34th Baeksang Arts Awards	Most Popular Actress (Film)	Downfall	Won
1999	20th Blue Dragon Film Awards	Best Leading Actress	The Ring Virus	Nominated
2001	22nd Blue Dragon Film Awards	Popular Star Award	My Wife Is a Gangster	Won
2002	1st Korean Film Awards	Best Actress	A Perfect Match	Nominated
2007	SBS Drama Awards	Top Excellence Award, Actress	Bad Couple	Nominated
2007	SBS Drama Awards	Top 10 Stars	Bad Couple	Won
2008	KBS Drama Awards	Excellence Award, Actress in a Serial Drama	Mom's Dead Upset	Nominated
2009	MBC Drama Awards	Top Excellence Award, Actress	White Lie	Nominated
2010	MBC Drama Awards	Top Excellence Award, Actress	Flames of Desire	Won
2012	SBS Drama Awards	Excellence Award, Actress in a Weekend/Serial Drama	Still You	Won
2012	SBS Drama Awards	Top 10 Stars	Still You	Won
2013	21st Korean Culture and Entertainment Awards	Top Excellence Award, Actress in a Drama	The Scandal	Won
2013	MBC Drama Awards	Top Excellence Award, Actress in a Special Project Drama	The Scandal	Won
2020	SBS Drama Awards	Excellence Award, Actress in a Mid-Length Drama	The Penthouse: War in Life	Won
2021	57th Baeksang Arts Awards	Best Supporting Actress – Television	The Penthouse: War in Life	Nominated
