= You Call It Passion =

- Theatrical release poster
- Hangul: 열정 같은 소리 하고 있네
- Lit.: Talking About Things Like Passion
- RR: Yeoljeong gateun sori hago inne
- MR: Yŏlchŏng kat'ŭn sori hago inne
- Directed by: Jeong Gi-hun
- Screenplay by: Jeong Gi-hun; Seo Yoo-min
- Based on: You Call It Passion by Lee Hye-rin
- Produced by: Jung Du-hwan
- Starring: Jung Jae-young; Park Bo-young
- Production company: Banzakbanzak Film
- Distributed by: NEW
- Release date: November 25, 2015
- Running time: 106 minutes
- Country: South Korea
- Language: Korean
- Box office: US$3.9 million

You Call It Passion (Korean: 열정 같은 소리 하고 있네) is a 2015 South Korean comedy-drama film based on the novel of the same name written by Lee Hye-rin. It is about a new graduate who struggles to survive in the war of entertainment news.

== Plot ==
Do Ra-hee (Park Bo-young) enters Dongmyung, a newspaper company, as an intern in the entertainment section. She soon discovers the dirty and hidden aspects of the journalism industry and learns the passion and enthusiasm of the press. She has to make non-existing news by corroborating stories. Her first assignment as an official journalist is to do a write up of a sexual assault scandal involving an upcoming young actor, Woo Ji-han (Yoon Kyun-sang), of a film studio JS. From her investigation of the new evidence of the scandal given to her for the write up, she found the evidence to be fabricated. So she told her boss, Ha Jae-kwan (Jung Jae-young) she is not going to do the write up. Her boss did the write up and post the scandalous article on their website.

Later, from her ex-mentor Seon-woo's (Bae Sung-woo) suggestion, she do a write up exposing the fabricated evidence used against the actor. The company refuses to use the write up. So, Ra-hee's colleagues assisted by posting the write up in the internet using public computers. This results in the arrest and prosecution of the film studio manager Jang (Jin Kyung) for corruption. The actor thanked her for clearing his name of the scandal. The movie ends with Ra-hee rushing out of the airport terminal where she send off her boyfriend Seo-jin (Ryu Deok-hwan) after receiving a tip off of a potential entertainment scoop.

== Cast ==
- Jung Jae-young as Ha Jae-kwan
- Park Bo-young as Do Ra-hee
- Oh Dal-su as General manager Ko
- Jin Kyung as Jang, film studio manager
- Bae Sung-woo as Seon-woo
- Ryu Hyun-kyung as Chae-eun
- Ryu Deok-hwan as Seo-jin
- Yoon Kyun-sang as Woo Ji-han
- Lee Kyu-hyung as Young-hwa
- Lee Byung-joon as Chairman (cameo)
- Jang Hee-soo as Ra-hee's mother (cameo)
- Lee Young-jin as Jae-kwan's sister-in-law (cameo)
- Kim Sung-oh as Section chief Ma (cameo)
- Hyun Jyu-ni as Reporter Hyun (cameo)
- Yoon Joo as Leisure control person (cameo)
- Ha Ji-young as Supporting
