= Lie After Lie =

2020 South Korean television series

- Promotional poster
- Hangul: 거짓말의 거짓말
- Lit.: Lies of Lies
- RR: Geojinmarui geojinmal
- MR: Kŏjinmarŭi kŏjinmal
- Genre: Revenge; Mystery; Romance
- Written by: Kim Ji-eun
- Directed by: Kim Jung-kwon
- Starring: Lee Yu-ri; Yeon Jung-hoon
- Country of origin: South Korea
- Original language: Korean
- No. of episodes: 16

Production
- Executive producer: Park Jong-eun (Channel A)
- Producers: Kim Dong-rae; Choi Ji-young
- Running time: 70 minutes
- Production company: Raemongraein

Original release
- Network: Channel A
- Release: September 4 – October 24, 2020

Lie After Lie (Korean: 거짓말의 거짓말) is a South Korean television series starring Lee Yu-ri and Yeon Jung-hoon. It aired on Channel A from September 4 to October 24, 2020, every Friday and Saturday at 22:50 (KST). The drama was also simulcast on Drama Cube, Dramax and Sky TV.

As of October 10, the drama has soared to a new all-time high in viewership. Going by Nielsen Korea, the latest episode of Lie After Lie scored average ratings of 5.8 percent nationwide and 6.3 percent in the Seoul metropolitan area, marking the drama's highest ratings to date—and breaking its own record for the highest viewership ratings achieved by any drama in Channel A history. By the end of its run, the drama became one of the highest-rated Korean dramas in cable television history.

== Synopsis ==
Ji Eun-soo is the daughter-in-law of a chaebol family who appears to have everything. Her life falls apart when she is accused of murdering her abusive husband and sentenced to ten years in prison. While in prison, she gives birth to a baby girl, but is forced to place her into adoption. She and her father reach out to Kang Ji-min, a journalist who suspected foul play behind Eun-soo's case and the only one willing to hear Eun-soo's side of the story. However, after a while, her letters to Ji-min are mysteriously returned, while her father is later killed in a hit-and-run accident right before meeting Ji-min. Ji-min is also sent on an overseas assignment just as he gets closer to the truth. A determined Eun-soo tracks down her daughter upon her release and, in doing so, uncovers a complex web of lies and betrayal beginning with her former mother-in-law, CEO and respected businesswoman Kim Ho-ran.

== Cast ==
=== Main ===
- Lee Yu-ri as Ji Eun-soo, a woman who has been recently released from prison. A decade ago, she had been imprisoned for allegedly murdering her abusive ex-husband while pregnant. Following her release, she embarks on a mission to find the baby she had placed into adoption back then.
- Yeon Jung-hoon as Kang Ji-min, a respected TV reporter who is popular with his colleagues and a devoted father. He has no qualms about using his position as a journalist to uncover corruption and fight for justice. At the time of Ji Eun-soo's release from prison, he had been investigating DO Cosmetics for some time despite being told to drop it by his supervisor.

=== Supporting ===
- Lee Il-hwa as Kim Ho-ran, Ji Eun-soo's former mother-in-law. She is the CEO of DO Cosmetics who is known for her philanthropy and connections.
- Lim Ju-eun as Eun Se-mi, Kang Ji-min's ex-wife and a successful sports agent. She and Ji-min had adopted Woo-joo as an infant. They were initially a happy family until Ji-min's frequent traveling for work and a series of events led to the couple's bitter divorce. Ji-min received sole custody of Woo-joo and refused to grant Se-mi visitation rights.
- Kwon Hwa-woon as Kim Yeon-joon (David Kim), a pro golfer based in the U.S. that returns to South Korea to find his first love.
- Go Na-hee as Kang Woo-joo, adopted daughter of Kang Ji-min and Eun Se-mi whom Ji-min discovers to be Ji Eun-soo's biological child.

=== Recurring ===
- Lee Won-jong as Yoon Sang-gyu, Kim Ho-ran's former secretary and right hand man.
- Go Soo-hee as Jung Mi-jin, Eun-soo's cellmate who starts a new life after being released.
- Kim Seung-hwan as Kang Seung-hwa, Ji-min's father. He and his wife run a restaurant named after their granddaughter.
- Im Ye-jin as Hwang Hyo-soon, Ji-min's mother
- Jung Si-a as Kang Ji-gyung, Ji-min's younger sister
- Kwon Hyuk-hyun as Kim Woong, Kim Ho-ran's secretary

==== Channel A press office ====
- Choi Dae-sung as Seo Hyeong-guk, Ji-min's boss
- Yoon Sung-mo as Choi Hyun-bin, an outgoing junior colleague of Kang Ji-min.
- Baek Song-yi as Jung So-ri

=== Others ===
- Ha Ji-young as Hye-yeong's mom
- Im Han-bin as Jeon Jin-guk, Mi-jin's son
- Im Seung-dae as Jeon Bong-gu, Mi-jin's husband
- Moon Soo-bin as Chae Ryung
- Kim Tae-yeon as Young Hye

=== Special appearances ===
- Nam Myung-ryul as Ji Dong-ri, Eun-soo's father
- Song Jae-hee as Jeon Gi-bum, Eun-soo's abusive ex-husband and biological father of Woo-joo.
- Lee Chae-kyung, a prison guard
- Oh Jin-young
- Lee Chae-won

== Viewership ==
A 4.276% viewership rating was recorded nationwide for the series' fourth episode, making it the highest rating registered on Channel A history for a drama. However, its subsequent episodes continue to exceed its own rating record.

Lie After Lie : South Korea viewers per episode (millions)

Season	Episode number																Average
Season	1	2	3	4	5	6	7	8	9	10	11	12	13	14	15	16	Average
1	N/A	N/A	N/A	N/A	0.582	0.839	N/A	0.938	N/A	0.897	1.120	1.182	1.055	1.178	1.294	1.784	N/A

Source: Audience measurement performed nationwide by Nielsen Korea.

Average TV viewership ratings
Ep.	Original broadcast date	Average audience share (Nielsen Korea)	
Ep.	Original broadcast date	Nationwide	Seoul
1	September 4, 2020	1.169%	—N/a
2	September 5, 2020	2.608%	—N/a
3	September 11, 2020	2.577%	3.089%
4	September 12, 2020	4.276%	4.281%
5	September 18, 2020	2.895%	3.016%
6	September 19, 2020	4.210%	4.396%
7	September 25, 2020	2.710%	—N/a
8	September 26, 2020	4.542%	5.148%
9	October 2, 2020	3.332%	4.189%
10	October 3, 2020	4.165%	4.265%
11	October 9, 2020	5.160%	5.360%
12	October 10, 2020	5.847%	6.336%
13	October 16, 2020	5.604%	5.676%
14	October 17, 2020	5.828%	6.463%
15	October 23, 2020	6.393%	6.437%
16	October 24, 2020	8.203%	8.649%
Average		4.345%	— (Note: Due to some ratings not recorded, the exact average rating is unknown.)
The blue numbers represent the lowest ratings and the red numbers represent the highest ratings.; N/A denotes that the rating is not known.; This drama airs on a cable channel/pay TV which normally has a relatively smaller audience compared to free-to-air TV/public broadcasters (KBS, SBS, MBC and EBS).
