= Maestra: Strings of Truth =

2023–2024 South Korean television series

- Promotional poster
- Hangul: 마에스트라
- Lit.: Maestra
- RR: Maeseuteura
- MR: Maësŭt'ŭra
- Genre: Mystery; Thriller; Music
- Based on: Philharmonia by Marine Gacem
- Developed by: Studio Dragon (planning)
- Written by: Choi Yi-yoon; Hong Jung-hee
- Directed by: Kim Jung-kwon
- Starring: Lee Young-ae; Lee Moo-saeng; Kim Young-jae; Hwang Bo-reum-byeol
- Music by: Cho Seung-woo
- Country of origin: South Korea
- Original language: Korean
- No. of episodes: 12

Production
- Cinematography: Ha Kyung-ho
- Running time: 60–70 minutes
- Production companies: RaemongRaein; Group 8
- Budget: ₩17.5 billion

Original release
- Network: tvN
- Release: December 9, 2023 – January 14, 2024

Maestra: Strings of Truth (Korean: 마에스트라) is a South Korean television series starring Lee Young-ae, Lee Moo-saeng, Kim Young-jae, and Hwang Bo-reum-byeol. Based on the France 2 TV series titled Philharmonia, it is about the struggles and growth of one of the only 5% female conductors in the world. It aired on tvN from December 9, 2023 to January 14, 2024, every Saturday and Sunday at 21:20 (KST). It is also available for streaming on TVING in South Korea, and on Disney+ in selected regions.

== Synopsis ==
The series is about a secretive female conductor who faces the truth surrounding her by digging into the mysterious incidents that happen within her orchestra.

== Cast ==
=== Main ===
- Lee Young-ae as Cha Se-eum: a former violinist and a world-renowned conductor of an orchestra named The Hangang Philharmonic, who fascinates performers and audience members with her bold and determined personality.
  - Woo Da-bi as young Cha Se-eum
- Lee Moo-saeng as Yoo Jung-jae: Se-eum's ex-lover who is an investment tycoon and the chairman of UC Financial.
  - Lim Sung-kyun as young Yoo Jung-jae
- Hwang Bo-reum-byeol as Lee Ru-na: a violinist and the youngest concertmaster of The Hangang Philharmonic.
- Kim Young-jae as Kim Pil: Se-eum's overly dependent husband who seems to be affectionate and considerate, but feels inferior to his wife due to her success.
  - Jin Geon-woo as young Kim Pil

=== Supporting ===
==== People around Cha Se-eum ====
- Jung Dong-hwan as Cha Ki-baek: Se-eum's father who is a musical instrument maker.
- Ye Soo-jung as Bae Jeong-hwa: Se-eum's mother who is a former violinist.
- Kim Young-ah as Lee Hye-jeong: best friend and workshop manager of Se-eum.
- Kang Ji-eun as Woo Young-seon: Jeong-hwa's doctor.

==== People around Yoo Jung-jae ====
- Choi Yun-so as Go Yu-ra: the director of KVN Broadcasting Station and Jung-jae's ex-wife.
- Kim Hyun-jun as Go Han-gil: Jung-jae's long-time friend and Yu-ra's older brother.
- Kim Tae-Geun as Secretary Park: Jung-jae's secretary.

==== The Hangang Philharmonic ====
- Park Ho-san as Jeon Sang-do: the cheerful and quick-witted CEO of The Hangang Philharmonic.
- Yang Jun-mo as Ma Yo-seop: a timpanist and the orchestra's union leader.
- Jin Ho-eun as Kim Bong-ju: the principal oboist.
- Lee Jung-yeol as Park Jae-man: a concertmaster and the oldest member of The Hangang Philharmonic.
- Lee Si-won as Lee Ah-jin: a horn player.
- Kim Min-kyu as Kim Tae-ho: Se-eum's secretary and her long-time fan.
- Jin So-yeon as Kwon Su-jin: an associate concertmaster.
- Jung Seon-ah as Heo Young-mi: the principal second violinist.
- Min A-ram as Shin Ji-ae: assistant principal second violinist.
- Han Jin-hee as Kang In-han: the principal first violinist.
- Hwang Geon as Novaha: the principal cellist.
- Lee Byung-joon as Oh Hyun-seok: the assistant conductor.
- Lim Se-joo as Chief Hwang: Sang-do's secretary.

==== Others ====
- Ha Ji-young as Kim Song-yi: a reporter
- Choi Soo-gyun as Lee Hae-na: Ru-na's older sister.
- Baek Sung-cheol as Chu Dong-sik: a detective.
- as Baek Joo-won: a detective.

== Production ==
Filming began soon after the first script reading of the cast, which was held at the end of February 2023. Lee Young-ae started learning conducting and playing violin from November 2022, while Hwang Bo-reum-byeol practiced playing violin for about eight months.

Filming of the series had completed by November 1, 2023.

In July 2023, production company RaemongRaein announced that it had signed a supply contract with Studio Dragon for the production of the series worth 17.5 billion won.

== Viewership ==
Maestra: Strings of Truth : South Korea viewers per episode (thousands)

Season	Episode number											
Season	1	2	3	4	5	6	7	8	9	10	11	12
1	809	978	1087	N/A	N/A	N/A	N/A	N/A	913	1148	1160	1471

Source: Audience measurement performed nationwide by Nielsen Korea.

Average TV viewership ratings
Ep.	Original broadcast date	Average audience share (Nielsen Korea)	
Ep.	Original broadcast date	Nationwide	Seoul
1	December 9, 2023	4.192% (1st)	4.546% (1st)
2	December 10, 2023	4.844% (2nd)	5.699% (1st)
3	December 16, 2023	5.402% (1st)	6.013% (1st)
4	December 17, 2023	6.010% (1st)	6.1%
5	December 23, 2023	5.186% (1st)	N/A
6	December 24, 2023	5.275% (1st)	N/A
7	December 30, 2023	5.256% (1st)	6.2%
8	December 31, 2023	4.978% (1st)	N/A
9	January 6, 2024	4.656% (1st)	4.893% (1st)
10	January 7, 2024	5.421% (1st)	5.497% (1st)
11	January 13, 2024	5.997% (1st)	6.746% (1st)
12	January 14, 2024	6.784% (1st)	6.740% (1st)
Average		5.333%	— (Note: Due to multiple unpublished ratings, the exact average rating is unknown.)
In the table above, the blue numbers represent the lowest ratings and the red numbers represent the highest ratings.; N/A denotes ratings that were not published.; This series aired on a cable channel/pay TV which normally has a relatively smaller audience compared to free-to-air TV/public broadcasters (KBS, SBS, MBC, and EBS).
