= My Wife Is a Gangster 3 =

2006 Korean film by Jo Jin-kyu

- Theatrical release poster
- Hangul: 조폭 마누라 3
- Hanja: 組暴 마누라 3
- RR: Jopok manura 3
- MR: Chop'ok manura 3
- Directed by: Jo Jin-kyu
- Written by: Seo Se-young; Jo So-yeon; Kang Su-jin; Jeong Ui-mok; Gye Yun-sik
- Produced by: Charles Kim; Chu Chen On
- Starring: Shu Qi; Lee Beom-soo; Hyun Young; Oh Ji-ho; Ti Lung
- Cinematography: Baek Dong-hyeon
- Edited by: Park Gok-ji; Jung Jin-hee
- Music by: Park Se-jun
- Distributed by: Showbox; Mediaplex; Paramount Pictures
- Release date: December 28, 2006
- Running time: 115 minutes
- Country: South Korea
- Languages: Korean; Chinese

My Wife is a Gangster 3 (Korean: 조폭 마누라 3) is a 2006 South Korean-American film. It is a sequel to My Wife Is a Gangster 2.

Despite bearing the My Wife Is a Gangster title, the film has little to no relation to the previous films.

== Plot ==
Korean gangster Han Ki-Chul is put in charge by his Big Boss of looking after Lim Aryong who comes from Hong Kong. They expect Lim Aryong to be some big male gangster but she turns out to be a woman and acts very cold toward him and his associates. Moreover, none of them speak her language and she doesn't understand Korean. A translator called Yeon-Hee arrives. She is immature and very scared of the gangsters so at the beginning, instead of translating Aryong's rather rude answers, she changes them to nice ones. Quickly, Aryong shows her fierce fighting skills beating other bosses to save her companions. Ki-Chul and his associates, who are rather unskilled, are impressed and become afraid of her while, upon finding that they are actually nice, she's trying to be more friendly. Her efforts are ruined by Yeon-Hee who, taking advantage of Aryong's fearsome aura, 'translates' very threatening sentences.

Soon after, they are attacked by professional assassins. They think that they are after Ki-Chul while, in fact, they want to kill Aryong who is the daughter of a boss in Hong Kong and is accused of having killed another boss, triggering a gangster war there. They then separate and Aryong and Ki-Chul's car is chased by the assassins but they manage to take refuge in his family. His parents believe that she is his girlfriend and give him a family necklace to give her. The assassins find her again but she overcomes them, especially the woman who really killed the boss. She then goes to meet her mother who is the reason why she chose to hide in Korea, but seeing that she found a new family and is happy, she gives up speaking to her.

After that, she leaves Korea despite Ki-Chul's confession, even if she accepts the necklace. In Hong Kong, her father dies from his injuries caused by an explosion decided by the other boss. Even though Ki-Chul comes to support her, she leaves to take revenge. She then fights the other boss's gangsters with success and eventually she faces the boss. After cheating, he was going to shoot her as Ki-Chul arrives, distracting him. The boss shoots Ki-Chul first, allowing Aryong to come close to him and to kill him. Ki-Chul is not dead but is going to leave Hong Kong. Aryong, after becoming the new boss, succeeding her father, is advised by her father's right-hand man not to let him leave, as did her father who let her mother leave and then regretted it all his life. She follows the advice, stopping him on his way to the airport with all her gangsters and proposes to Ki-Chul, the right-hand man making the translation (not always a very accurate one, like Yeon-Hee). Ki-Chul accepts it and they embrace on the motorway.

== Cast ==
- Shu Qi as Lim Yaling (Chinese: 林雅玲; pinyin: Lín Yǎlíng)
- Lee Beom-soo as Ki-chul (기철, Gi-cheol)
- Hyun Young as Yeon-hee (연희, Yeon-hui)
- Oh Ji-ho as Pacific Saury
- Ti Lung as Chairman Im (special appearance)

== See also ==
- Singh is Bling, a 2015 Indian Hindi-language remake of My Wife Is a Gangster 3
- James Bond, a 2015 Indian Telugu-language remake of My Wife Is a Gangster (2001)
