= Im Ji-eun =

South Korean actress (born 1973)

- Born: February 27, 1973 (age 53); South Korea
- Education: Seoul Institute of the Arts - Film; Sangmyung University - Theater and Film Studies
- Occupation: Actress
- Years active: 1998–present
- Agent: DMCC Entertainment
- Spouse: Go Myung-hwan (m. 2014)

Korean name
- Hangul: 임지은
- Hanja: 林志恩
- RR: Im Jieun
- MR: Im Chiŭn

Im Ji-eun (Korean: 임지은; born February 27, 1973) is a South Korean actress.

== Filmography ==
=== Television series ===
Year	Title	Role	Network
2000	Pardon	Go Joo-hee	SBS
2001	Flower Story	In-ae	KBS1
2001	Everyday With You	Yoo Sun-mi	MBC
2002	Golden Wagon	Hwang Yoo-jung	MBC
2002	Let's Get Married	Moon Yeo-kyung	KBS2
2002	Inspector Park Mun-su	Lee Yeon-hee	MBC
2003	A Problem at My Younger Brother's House	Park Mi-ri	SBS
2004	My Hidden Love	Park Chan-joo	MBC
2004	The Age of Heroes	Kang Hye-young	MBC
2005	Pharmacist Kim's Daughters	Kim Yong-bin	MBC
2005	Recipe of Love	Baek So-ra	MBC
2006	Rude Woman	Kim Eun-young	MBC
2008	Birth of a Newly Married Couple	Eun-jeong	KBS2
2008	Painter of the Wind	Queen Jeongsun	SBS
2008	White Lie	Hong Na-kyung	MBC
2010	Master of Study	Lee Eun-yoo	KBS2
2010	Three Sisters	Kang Mi-ran	SBS
2010	The President	Oh Jae-hee	KBS2
2011	Brain	Hong Eun-sook	KBS2
2012	The Moon and Stars For You	Park Na-rae	KBS1
2012	Big	Kang Hee-soo	KBS2
2013	A Tale of Two Sisters	Choi Il-young	KBS1
2014	Cunning Single Lady	Wang Ji-hyun	MBC
2014	KBS Drama Special: "The Dirge Singer"	Do-hwa	KBS2
2014	Make Your Wish	Jo Myung-hee	MBC
2014	The King's Face	Queen Uiin	KBS2
2015	Hello Monster	Hyun Ji-soo	KBS2
2016	My Mind's Flower Rain	Chun Il-ran	KBS2
2016	You Are a Gift	Kong Eul-sook	SBS

=== Film ===
Year	Title	Role	Note
1999	Fly Low	Ju-kyeong	
2000	Vanishing Twin	Jung-hwa	
2002	Sympathy for Mr. Vengeance	Ryu's sister	
2002	Family	Dong-gu's bride	
2007	Going by the Book	Kim Sung-mi	
2007	Girl Scout	Seong Hye-ran	
2013	Hwayi: A Monster Boy	Young-joo	

== Awards and nominations ==
Year	Award	Category	Nominated work	Result
2002	MBC Drama Awards	Best New Actress	Golden Wagon	Won
2010	SBS Drama Awards	Best Supporting Actress in a Weekend/Daily Drama	Three Sisters	Won
2010	KBS Drama Awards	Best Supporting Actress	Master of Study	Nominated
