= Song Jae-hee =

South Korean actor

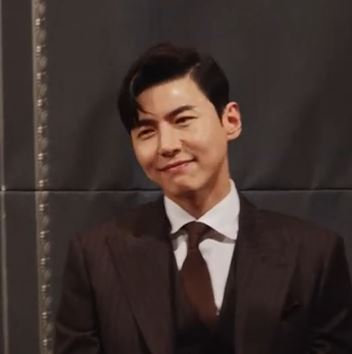
- Born: December 11, 1979 (age 46); South Korea
- Education: Seoul Institute of the Arts - Film
- Occupation: Actor
- Years active: 2006–present
- Agent: Han Ah-reum Company
- Spouse: Ji So-yeon (m. 2017)
- Children: 3

Korean name
- Hangul: 송재희
- Hanja: 宋在熙
- RR: Song Jaehui
- MR: Song Chaehŭi

Song Jae-hee (Korean: 송재희; born December 11, 1979) is a South Korean actor.

== Personal life ==
In August 2022, Song announced that his wife was pregnant with their first child. His wife gave birth to a daughter on January 20, 2023. The couple welcomed twins, a boy and a girl, on September 15, 2025.

== Filmography ==
=== Film ===
Year	Title	Role
2006	Monopoly	NSI LA agent 3
2007	Temptation of Eve: Kiss	Ji-hoon
2007	Swindler in My Mom's House	Ppak-se
2009	Lifting King Kong	Waiter
2011	Metamorphoses (short film)	
2012	Star	Jae-hyun
2014	Finally (short film)	Joon-seok
2015	Snow Is on the Sea	Coach Nam
2024	In the Realm of Ripley	

=== Television series ===
Year	Title	Role	Network	Notes/Ref.
2007–08	One Thousand and One Nights of Erotic Fantasy	Tae-sung (season 1), Jung-in (season 2)	OCN	
2010	Road No. 1	Yang Kang-tae	MBC	Supporting role
2010	I'm Glad I Loved You	Deputy section chief Song	KBS2	Minor role
2012	Moon Embracing the Sun	Heo Yeom	MBC	Supporting role
2012	Rooftop Prince	Park-ha's blind date	SBS	cameo, episodes 8–9
2012	Still You	Kang Woo-jin	SBS	Main role
2013	Hur Jun, The Original Story	Lee Jung-myung	MBC	Minor role
2013	Blue Tower	Geeky recruit	tvN	Minor role
2014	You're Only Mine	Kang Sung-jae	SBS	Main role
2014	Only Love	Kang Sung-jae	SBS	cameo
2014	What Happens to My Family?	Byun Woo-tak	KBS2	Supporting role
2015	All Is Well	Yoo Hyung-joon	KBS2	Main role
2016	You Are a Gift	Ma Seong-jin	SBS	Main role
2016	My Horrible Boss	Ji Yoon-ho	JTBC	Supporting role
2018	Grand Prince	King	TV Chosun	Minor role
2018	The Last Empress	The Late King or Lee Hyuk's father	SBS	Minor role, episodes 14 and 19
2019	Babel	Tae Soo Ho	TV Chosun	Supporting role
2020	Lie After Lie	Jeon Gi-bum	Channel A	Guest appearance
2022	Cleaning Up	Yoon Tae-kyung	JTBC	

== Discography ==
=== Soundtrack appearances ===
Year	Song title	Notes
2012	"If You Can Be Happy"	Still You OST
