= Jo Hee-bong =

South Korean actor

- Born: August 23, 1971 (age 55); South Korea
- Education: Sogang University - Economics
- Occupation: Actor
- Years active: 1997–present
- Agent: Billions

Korean name
- Hangul: 조희봉
- Hanja: 曺熙奉
- RR: Jo Huibong
- MR: Cho Hŭibong
- Website: starvillent.com/starvillage-artist

Jo Hee-bong (born August 23, 1971) is a South Korean actor. Hee-bong began his acting career in 1997 as part of the theatre troupe Bipa (비파). He later became known as a supporting actor onscreen, in films such as Blind (2011) and Incomplete Life: Prequel (2013), and the television dramas Hong Gil-dong (2008), Joseon X-Files (2010), and Good Doctor (2013).

In a collaboration with director Kim Tae-yong, Jo is also the live narrator (or byeonsa) for Crossroads of Youth (1934), Korea's oldest surviving silent film. Aside from local performances in 2008 and 2012, Jo has performed at the 2009 New York Film Festival, the 2011 International Film Festival in Mexico, the 2011 Thames Festival in London, and the 2013 Berlin International Film Festival.

== Filmography ==
=== Film ===
Year	Title	Role	Notes
2003	Singles	Director Cheon	
2004	The Wolf Returns	Kwang-soo	
2004	Twentidentity		segment: "Pass Me"
2004	The Big Swindle	Detective Park	
2004	Superstar Mr. Gam	Kim Sam-yong	
2005	All for Love	Businessman (cameo)	
2006	One Shining Day		
2006	Family Ties	Man searching on train platform (cameo)	
2006	Three Fellas	Police substation chief	
2006	Mission Sex Control	Bok-man	
2006	Cruel Winter Blues	Village head	
2006	Midnight Ballad for Ghost Theater	Projectionist / Japanese lieutenant Hiroshi / Tetsuo	
2006	My Wife Is a Gangster 3	Domi	
2007	Femme Fatal	Gangster boss Choi	
2007	The Worst Guy Ever	Jung-kil	
2008	Once Upon a Time	Chef	
2008	A Man Who Was Superman	Audio engineer (cameo)	
2008	Antique	Boxer (cameo)	
2008	The Accidental Gangster and the Mistaken Courtesan	Delivery man 1 (cameo)	
2008	Ten Ten	Chang-nam	segment: "Blind Date"
2009	Oishii Man	(cameo)	
2009	If You Were Me 4		segment: "U and Me"
2009	The Righteous Thief	Detective Park	
2010	Bestseller	Middle-aged man 2	
2011	Moby Dick	Photographer Im (cameo)	
2011	Blind	Detective Jo	
2012	Pacemaker	Jong-soo	
2012	Love Fiction	Publisher Kwak / Detective squad chief Kwak	
2012	A Millionaire on the Run	Gangster boss Jo	
2013	Montage	Detective Kang	
2013	Incomplete Life: Prequel	Oh Sang-shik	
2014	The Pirates	Oh Man-ho	
2014	Phantoms of the Archive		segment: "A Hat's Journey"
2014	Wild Flowers		
2015	Empire of Lust	Hwajeon owner (cameo)	
2015	The Long Way Home	Drunkard	

=== TV films ===
Year	Title	Role
2015	I'm After You	Sang-Jin

=== Television series ===
Year	Title	Role	Notes/Ref.
2006	A Farewell to Arms		
2006	Drama City		Episode "The Stars Shine Brightly"
2007	Lucifer		
2008	Hong Gil-dong	King Gwanghae	
2008	Drama City	Park Hak-seok	Episode "Disciplinary Committee"
2008	Night After Night	Jo Sang-chul	
2008	Love Marriage	Park Hyun-seong	
2009	Kyung-sook, Kyung-sook's Father	Myung-rang	
2009	Partner	Taxi driver	recurring character, episodes 9-13
2010	The Slave Hunters	Kkeut-bong	
2010	Joseon X-Files	Jang-man	
2010	Sunday Drama Theater	Nephew	Episode "It's Me, Grandma"
2010	The Fugitive: Plan B	James Bong	
2010	KBS Drama Special		Episode "Pianist"
2011	You're So Pretty	Jang Dae-poong	
2011	Deep Rooted Tree	Han Myung-hoi/Han Ga-nom	
2011	KBS Drama Special	In-ho	Episode "My Wife Disappeared"
2012	Man from the Equator	Mr. Koon	
2012	I Do, I Do	Seol Bong-soo	
2012	KBS Drama Special	Lee Soo-chul	Episode "The Whereabouts of Noh Sook-ja"
2012	Only Because It's You	Ma Do-yo	
2012	KBS Drama Special	Lee Kang-seok	Episode "Daddy's Coming"
2013	The Virus	Go Soo-kil	
2013	Good Doctor	Go Choong-man	
2013	Basketball	One-man band	
2013	KBS Drama Special	Jae-kwan	Episode "My Dad Is a Nude Model"
2013	My Love from the Star	Company president Ahn	
2014	Three Days	Go Young-hoon	
2014	Golden Cross	Kang Joo-dong	
2014	Steal Heart	Hong Gye-pal	
2014	My Lovely Girl	Kang Tae-min	
2015	A Girl Who Sees Smells	Detective Ki	
2015	Love on a Rooftop	Byun Joon-bae	
2015	Six Flying Dragons	Ha Ryun	
2015	KBS Drama Special	Detective Park	Episode "Secret"
2016	Beautiful Gong Shim	Salon's CEO	
2016	Love in the Moonlight	Eunuch Sung	
2016	The K2	Police officer	Cameo
2017	Naked Fireman	Kwon Jeong-nam	
2017	My Sassy Girl	Gyeon Pil-hyung	
2017	Tunnel	Jeon Sung-sik	
2017	Distorted	Yang Dong-sik	
2018	Switch	Director Bong	
2018	Your House Helper	Go Tae-soo	
2018	Four Men		
2019–2020	Unasked Family	Nam Il-nam	
2020	Oh My Baby	Nam Soo-cheol	
2020	Drama Special	Hwang Geum-song	Episode "One Night"
2020–2022	The Good Detective	Woo Bong-shik	Season 1–2
2021	The Red Sleeve	Hong Jung-yeo	
2022	Bloody Heart	Ma Seo-bang	
2022–2023	The First Responders	Yang Chi-young	Season 1–2
2023	Joseon Attorney	Park Je-soo	
2023	Numbers	Chief Koo	
2023–2024	Korea–Khitan War	Yoo Jin	
2024	Dreaming of a Freaking Fairy Tale	Ban Dan-ah's dad	Cameo
2024	KBS Drama Special	cloth dealer	Episode "The Two Women"
2025	Shin's Project	Kim Yong-Woo	
2025	Nice to Not Meet You	CEO Son	

== Theater ==
Year	Title	Role	Reprised
2004	Art	Soo-hyun	2005, 2008
2008	Crossroads of Youth	Byeonsa	2009, 2011, 2012, 2013
2009	University of Laughs	Playwright	2010
2010	Yi	Eunuch Hong	

== Awards and nominations ==
Year	Award	Category	Nominated work	Result
2006	KBS Drama Awards	Excellence Award, Actor in a One-Act/Special/Short Drama	The Stars Shine Brightly	Nominated
2008	KBS Drama Awards	Excellence Award, Actor in a One-Act/Special/Short Drama	Disciplinary Committee	Nominated
2008	KBS Drama Awards	Best Supporting Actor	Hong Gil-dong	Nominated
2011	48th Grand Bell Awards	Best Supporting Actor	Blind	Nominated
2012	SBS Drama Awards	Special Acting Award, Actor in a Weekend/Daily Drama	Only Because It's You	Nominated
2013	KBS Drama Awards	Best Supporting Actor	Good Doctor	Nominated
