= Lee Bo-young =

South Korean actress (born 1979)

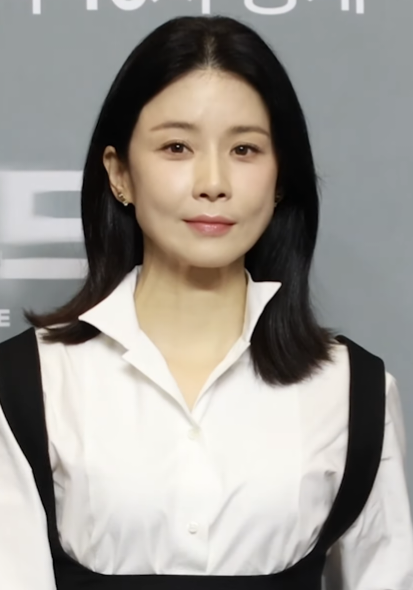
- Lee in March 2024
- Born: January 12, 1979 (age 47); Seoul, South Korea
- Education: Seoul Women's University (B.A. in Korean Literature)
- Occupation: Actress
- Years active: 2002–present
- Agent: J-Wide Company
- Spouse: Ji Sung (m. 2013)
- Children: 2
- Beauty pageant titleholder
- Major competition: Miss Korea 2000

Korean name
- Hangul: 이보영
- RR: I Boyeong
- MR: I Poyŏng
- Website: jwide.co.kr

Lee Bo-young (Korean: 이보영; born January 12, 1979) is a South Korean actress, model and beauty pageant titleholder. She is best known for starring in the television dramas Seoyoung, My Daughter (2012–2013), I Can Hear Your Voice (2013), Whisper (2017), Mother (2018), Mine (2021), and Agency (2023). Lee was Gallup Korea's Television Actor of the Year in 2013.

== Career ==
She began her career in the industry with winning the Daejeon entry for the Miss Korea 2000. Having majored in Korean literature at Seoul Women's University, she originally dreamed of becoming a news presenter. She was one of 15 finalists in MBC's annual recruitment drive in 2002, but ended up not getting the job. Instead, she turned to modeling, and was chosen as the exclusive advertising model for Asiana Airlines, considered a gateway to stardom.

Lee made her acting debut in 2003, and among her early roles were in People of the Water Flower Village (2004) opposite Song Il-gook, and as the antagonist in Save the Last Dance for Me (2004).

In 2005, Lee played her first leading role in the daily drama My Sweetheart, My Darling, followed by the Silla-set historical epic Ballad of Seodong with Jo Hyun-jae. She spent the next several years in television dramas — Mr. Goodbye with Ahn Jae-wook, Queen of the Game with Joo Jin-mo, and Becoming a Billionaire with Ji Hyun-woo — but none struck a chord with audiences or critics. After playing the love interest in My Brother (2004) and A Dirty Carnival (2006), Lee was cast in her first major big screen role in Once Upon a Time (2008). The heist comedy is set during colonial rule in the 1940s, and she and Park Yong-woo played notorious swindlers out to steal a diamond from the Japanese army.

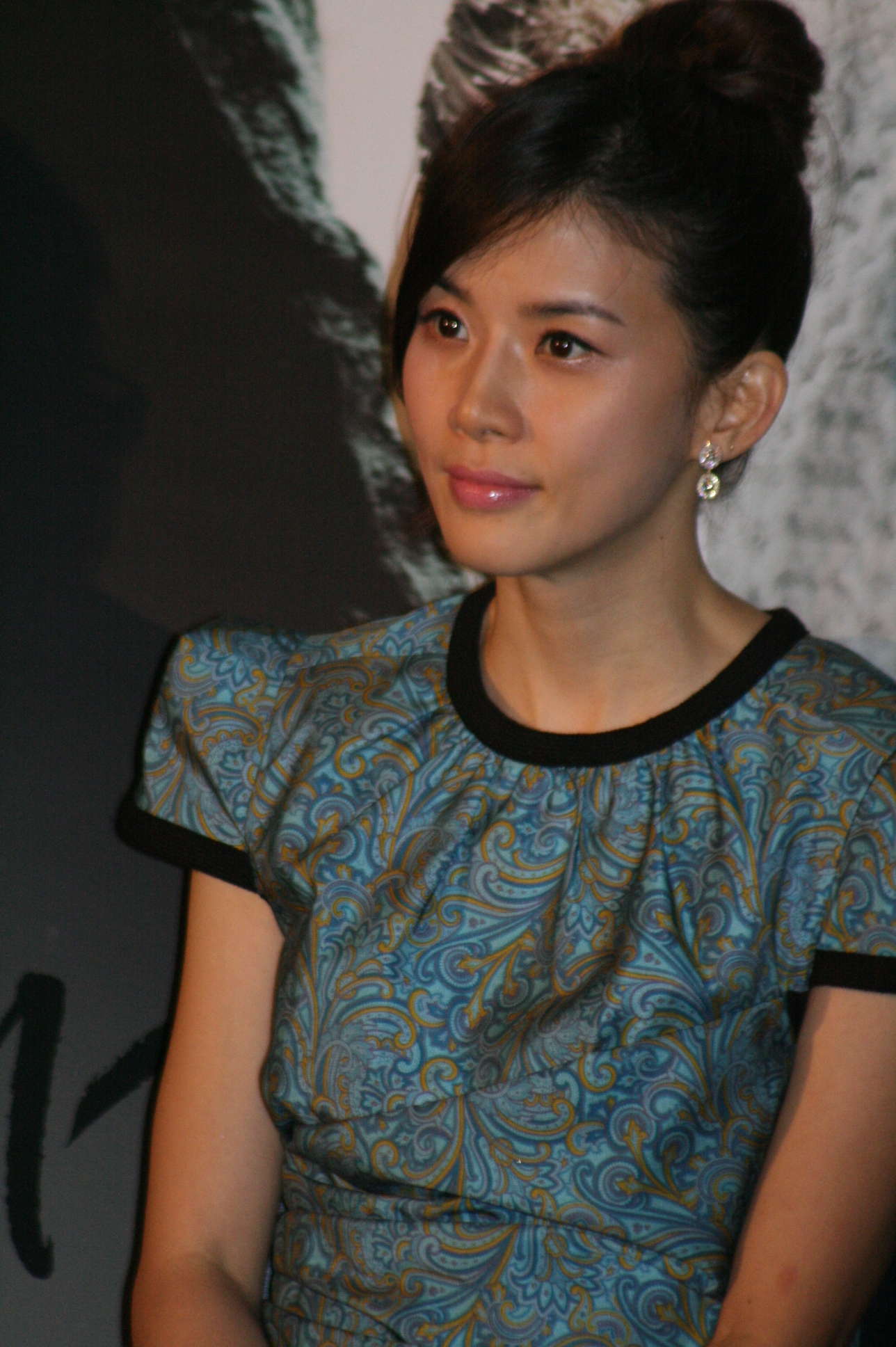
Lee in November 2009

Her two films released in 2009 were both melodramas. In More than Blue, Lee plays the soulmate of a terminally ill man (Kwon Sang-woo), but their love ends in a tragedy undercut with a poetic sparseness. While in I Am Happy, Lee played a nurse who falls for a patient in the psychiatric ward (Hyun Bin), and in each other they find consolation to see them through their harsh and miserable reality.

Lee returned to television in 2010, playing a seductress in the quirky cable drama Golden House opposite Shin Ha-kyun. She then had a guest arc as the president's daughter in spy series Athena: Goddess of War, followed by post-divorce romance series Bravo, My Love! with Lee Tae-sung, and revenge drama Man from the Equator (2012) with Uhm Tae-woong.

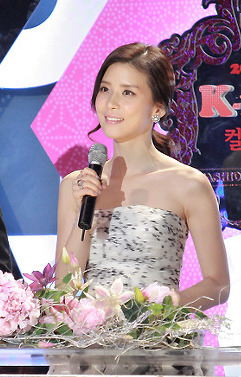
Lee in March 2012

She then played the titular character in Seoyoung, My Daughter (2012–2013), a career woman who is angry at her father (Chun Ho-jin), whose gambling addiction led to her mother's death, yet she struggles to keep the family together and make ends meet. Lee said playing Seo-young required a greater depth of emotion than any of her previous roles, which left her drained but also feeling a greater sense of achievement. The family drama was the biggest hit yet of Lee's career; it dominated the weekly ratings chart for 22 straight weeks, and recorded a series high of 47.6% on its last episode, the highest Korean drama rating in 2013.

Her follow-up series I Can Hear Your Voice (2013) was also popular during its run. In it, Lee played a materialistic public defender who testified on behalf of a boy with supernatural abilities (Lee Jong-suk) a decade ago after she witnessed the boy's father being murdered. Critics said with her stubborn and argumentative character, Lee was able to break free of her previous calm and elegant image. She won several awards for her performance, including the Daesang ("Grand Prize"), the highest honor at the SBS Drama Awards. Lee was selected as Gallup Korea's Television Actor of the Year in 2013.

In 2014, Lee played a mother who travels back in time two weeks before her daughter's kidnapping and murder in God's Gift: 14 Days.

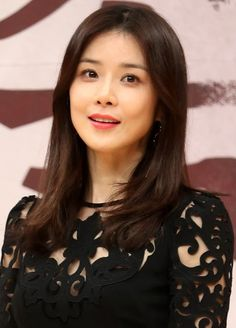
Lee in 2017

In 2017, Lee starred in SBS legal thriller Whisper, playing the role of a section chief of criminal division who gets dismissed from the police and later on disguise herself and work as an undercover at a law firm.

In 2018, Lee played the titular character in the tvN drama Mother - a role for which she won Best Actress at the 2018 Seoul International Drama Awards - a story adapted from the Japanese television series of the same name. She then starred in the melodrama When My Love Blooms in 2020 and black comedy Mine in 2022.

== Other activities ==
Lee is active in environmental causes, including the United Nations Convention to Combat Desertification. She and husband Ji Sung also makes donations to charitable causes regularly.

While on acting hiatus in 2015 during her pregnancy, she published the book Time of Love, a collection of essays on 23 books with themes of love, consolation and growth that have impacted Lee throughout her childhood and adulthood; they include The Little Prince, José Mauro de Vasconcelos's My Sweet Orange Tree, and Alain de Botton's Essays in Love.

Lee was confirmed to host 2017 SBS Drama Awards together with Shin Dong-yup. Previously, Lee has emceed the same award ceremony in 2013 together with Lee Hwi-jae and Kim Woo-bin.

In February 2023, Lee hosted the Accompanying charity concert to support Ukrainian children oppressed by the ongoing war.

== Personal life ==
=== Marriage and family ===
Lee met actor Ji Sung on the set of 2004 TV series Save Last Dance for Me, and they confirmed their relationship in 2007. On August 2, 2013, they announced their engagement by uploading handwritten letters on their respective official fan sites. They married at Aston House, W Seoul Walkerhill Hotel on September 27, 2013. Their first child, daughter Kwak Ji-yoo was born on June 13, 2015. Their second child, a son named Kwak Woo-sung, was born on February 5, 2019.

=== Philanthropy ===
In 2015, Lee donated 100 million won to the Children's Cancer Center at Seoul National University Hospital.

== Filmography ==
=== Film ===
Year	Title	Role
2004	My Brother	Mi-ryung
2006	A Dirty Carnival	Hyun-joo
2008	Once Upon a Time	Haruko / Choon-ja
2009	More than Blue	Eun-won ("Cream")
2009	I Am Happy	Soo-kyung

=== Television series ===
Year	Title	Role	Notes	Ref.
2003	Escape from Unemployment	Cha Mi-rim		
2003–2004	Long Live Love	Se-ryung		
2004	People of the Water Flower Village	Yoo Yeo-kyung		
2004	Jang Gil-san	Kwi-rye		
2004–2005	Save the Last Dance for Me	Yoon Soo-jin		
2005	Encounter	Choi Eom-ji		
2005	My Sweetheart, My Darling	Yoo In-young		
2005–2006	Ballad of Seodong	Princess Seonhwa of Silla		
2006	Mr. Goodbye	Choi Young-in		
2006–2007	Queen of the Game	Kang Eun-seol		
2010	Becoming a Billionaire	Lee Shin-mi		
2010	Golden House	Yoon Seo-rin		
2010	Athena: Goddess of War	Jo Soo-young	guest appearance (episodes 3–5)	
2011–2012	Bravo, My Love!	Kang Jae-mi		
2012	Man from the Equator	Han Ji-won		
2012–2013	Seoyoung, My Daughter	Lee Seo-young		
2013	I Can Hear Your Voice	Jang Hye-sung		
2014	God's Gift: 14 Days	Kim Soo-hyun		
2014	Pinocchio	Hye-sung car navigation	voice cameo (episode 3)	
2017	Whisper	Shin Young-joo		
2018	Mother	Kang Soo-jin		
2020	When My Love Blooms	Yoon Ji-soo		
2020	Start-Up	Woman at pub	Cameo (Episode 10)	
2021	Mine	Seo Hee-soo		
2023	Agency	Go Ah-in		
2023	See You in My 19th Life	Lee Sang-ah	Special appearance	
2024	Hide	Na Moon-young		
2025	Mary Kills People	Woo So-jung		

=== Television shows ===
Year	Title	Role	Ref.
2007	She's Olive - Lee Bo-young from Grasse to Paris	Host	
2013	eat CITY - Lee Bo-young's Italian Cafe	Host	

=== Music video appearances ===
Year	Song title	Artist	Ref.
2011	"Crying, Calling"	Zia & 4Men	

== Awards and nominations ==
Name of the award ceremony, year presented, category, nominee of the award, and the result of the nomination
Award ceremony	Year	Category	Nominee / Work	Result	Ref.
Andre Kim Best Star Awards	2007	Female Star Award	Lee Bo-young	Won	
Andre Kim Best Star Awards	2009	Female Star Award	Lee Bo-young	Won	
APAN Star Awards	2013	Top Excellence Award, Actress	I Can Hear Your Voice, Seoyoung, My Daughter	Won	
APAN Star Awards	2013	Best Couple Award	Lee Bo-young with Lee Jong-suk; I Can Hear Your Voice	Won	
APAN Star Awards	2018	Top Excellence Award, Actress in a Miniseries	Mother	Nominated	
Baeksang Arts Awards	2008	Best New Actress – Film	Once Upon a Time	Nominated	
Baeksang Arts Awards	2013	Best Actress – Television	Seoyoung, My Daughter	Nominated	
Baeksang Arts Awards	2014	Best Actress – Television	I Can Hear Your Voice	Won	
Baeksang Arts Awards	2018	Best Actress – Television	Mother	Nominated	
Brand Customer Loyalty Awards	2023	Best Actress – Drama	Agency	Won	
Chunsa Film Art Awards	2006	Best New Actress	A Dirty Carnival	Won	
Grimae Awards	2013	Best Actress	I Can Hear Your Voice	Won	
KBS Drama Awards	2005	Best New Actress	My Sweetheart, My Darling	Won	
KBS Drama Awards	2006	Excellence Award, Actress	Mr. Goodbye	Nominated	
KBS Drama Awards	2010	Excellence Award, Actress in a Mid-length Drama	Becoming a Billionaire	Nominated	
KBS Drama Awards	2012	Top Excellence Award, Actress	Man from the Equator, Seoyoung, My Daughter	Nominated	
KBS Drama Awards	2012	Excellence Award, Actress in a Mid-length Drama	Man from the Equator	Won	
KBS Drama Awards	2012	Excellence Award, Actress in a Serial Drama	Seoyoung, My Daughter	Nominated	
KBS Drama Awards	2012	Best Couple Award	Lee Bo-young with Lee Sang-yoon; Seoyoung, My Daughter	Won	
Korea Drama Awards	2013	Grand Prize (Daesang)	I Can Hear Your Voice, Seoyoung, My Daughter	Won	
Korea Drama Awards	2013	Best Couple Award	Lee Bo-young with Lee Jong-suk; I Can Hear Your Voice	Won	
MBC Drama Awards	2011	Excellence Award, Actress in a Miniseries	Bravo, My Love!	Won	
SBS Drama Awards	2005	New Star Award	Ballad of Seodong	Won	
SBS Drama Awards	2005	Top 10 Stars	Ballad of Seodong	Nominated	
SBS Drama Awards	2006	Excellence Award, Actress in a Miniseries	Queen of the Game	Nominated	
SBS Drama Awards	2006	Top 10 Stars	Queen of the Game	Won	
SBS Drama Awards	2013	Grand Prize (Daesang)	I Can Hear Your Voice	Won	
SBS Drama Awards	2013	Top Excellence Award, Actress in a Miniseries	I Can Hear Your Voice	Nominated	
SBS Drama Awards	2013	Producer's Award	I Can Hear Your Voice	Won	
SBS Drama Awards	2013	Top 10 Stars	I Can Hear Your Voice	Won	
SBS Drama Awards	2014	Top Excellence Award, Actress in a Miniseries	God's Gift: 14 Days	Nominated	
SBS Drama Awards	2017	Top Excellence Award, Actress in a Monday-Tuesday Drama	Whisper	Won	
Seoul International Drama Awards	2018	Best Actress	Mother	Won	
The Seoul Awards	2017	Best Actress	Whisper	Nominated	
