= Kim Bum-soo discography =

- Studio albums: 9
- Compilation albums: 1
- Singles: 34
- Remake albums: 2

Kim Bum-soo is a South Korean singer, regarded as one of the country's best vocalists. His discography consists of nine studio albums, one compilation album, two remake albums, and thirty four singles. He debuted in 1999 with the album A Promise and in 2001, became the first Korean to chart on the Billboard's Hot Singles Sales chart. He is best known for the single "I Miss You" which was released in December 2002 and has sold 2,500,000 copies on Gaon. Its parent album is also his most successful album to date, selling more than 170,000 copies in South Korea where it also peaked at number 6 on the Recording Industry Association of Korea's (RIAK) Monthly Album Sales chart.

After releasing his fifth album So Long..., Kim enlisted in the army to serve his mandatory military service. He returned in 2008 with the album Kim Bum Soo Vol. 6. In 2011, his popularity rose after appearing on the singing competition show I Am a Singer in which he was rewarded a "meritorious graduation" by the show after winning seven consecutive times. All of his covers from the show charted well, with his version of Lee So-ra's "Please" (제발) reaching 2.8 million copies sold on Gaon. His single "Last Love" (끝사랑) from his album Solista Part 2 was also a commercial success, selling over 2,500,000 copies on Gaon. He has since released moderately successful albums and singles as the lead artist and as a featured artist and singles for various films' and television series' soundtracks. He has also collaborated with a number of artists, most notably for the single "Different" (달라) with Girls' Generation member Taeyeon which peaked at number 2 on the Gaon Digital Chart and the singles "Person, Love (사람, 사랑)" and "White Winter (하얀 겨울)" with Lena Park which charted at number 6 and 7 on the Gaon Digital Chart respectively.

== Albums ==
=== Studio albums ===
List of studio albums, with selected details and chart positions
Title	Album details	Peak chart positions		Sales
Title	Album details	KOR (RIAK)	KOR (Circle)	Sales
A Promise	Released: March 2, 1999; Label: Team Entertainment; Formats: CD, cassette	36	—	KOR: 20,101
Remember	Released: November 7, 2000; Label: Team Entertainment; Formats: CD, cassette	27	—	KOR: 17,399
I Miss You (보고 싶다)	Released: December 17, 2002; Label: Team Entertainment; Formats: CD, cassette	6	5	KOR: 174,356
The 4th Episode	Released: April 20, 2004; Label: Team Entertainment; Formats: CD, cassette	5	—	KOR: 77,770
So Long...	Released: April 4, 2006; Label: Manwaldang Music Entertainment; Formats: CD, cassette	—	—	
Kim Bum Soo Vol. 6	Released: August 19, 2008; Label: Polaris Entertainment; Formats: CD	9	77	KOR: 18,547
Solista Part 1	Released: September 29, 2010; Label: Polaris Entertainment; Formats: CD, digital download	—N/a	17	
Solista Part 2	Released: June 16, 2011; Label: Polaris Entertainment; Formats: CD, digital download	—N/a	6	KOR: 4,572
Him	Released: November 21, 2014; Label: Polaris Entertainment; Formats: CD, digital download	—N/a	12	KOR: 2,165

=== Compilation albums ===
Title	Album details	Peak chart positions	Sales
Title	Album details	KOR (RIAK)	Sales
New Song & Special	Released: September 20, 2001; Label: Team Entertainment; Formats: CD, cassette	22	KOR: 25,523

=== Remake albums ===
Title	Album details	Peak chart positions	Sales
Title	Album details	KOR (RIAK)	Sales
Friends	Released: July 29, 2003; Label: Team Entertainment; Formats: CD, cassette	15	KOR: 21,573
Again	Released: January 22, 2005; Label: Team Entertainment; Formats: CD, cassette	5	KOR: 48,797

== Singles ==
List of singles, with selected chart positions, showing year released and album name
Title	Year	Peak chart positions			Sales	Album
Title	Year	KOR Gaon	KOR Hot	US Sales	Sales	Album
As lead artist
"A Promise" (약속)	1999	—N/a*	—N/a†	—		A Promise
"Once Upon a Day" (하루)	2000	—N/a*	—N/a†	—		Remember
"Tears"	2001	—N/a*	—N/a†	—		New Song & Special
"Hello Goodbye Hello"	2001	—N/a*	—N/a†	51		I Miss You
"I Miss You" (보고 싶다)	2002	—N/a*	—N/a†	—	KOR: 2,500,000	I Miss You
"You're Leaving Me" (니가 날 떠나)	2003	—N/a*	—N/a†	—		Friends
"Sun Sets in My Heart" (가슴에 지는 태양)	2004	—N/a*	—N/a†	—		The 4th Episode
"Consolation" (위로)	2006	—N/a*	—N/a†	—		So Long...
"Sadness Guide" (슬픔활용법)	2008	—N/a*	—N/a†	—		Kim Bum-soo 6th Album
"Regrets to Forget" (잊은만큼 후회해)	2009	—N/a*	—N/a†	—		Non-album single
"Color Of City (Blue)"	2009	—N/a*	—N/a†	—		Color of City Project
"Slow Man" feat. Chanyang	2009	—N/a*	—N/a†	—		Non-album single
"It Will Pass" (지나간다)	2010	19	62	—		Solista Part 1
"Last Love" (끝사랑)	2011	12	42	—	KOR: 2,500,000	Solista Part 2
"Rock Star"	2012	42	45	—	KOR: 139,180	Non-album single
"Higher"	2013	99	—	—	KOR: 18,670	Non-album single
"Teardrop of My Heart" (눈물나는 내 사랑)	2014	26	—N/a†	—	KOR: 98,779	Non-album single
"Home Meal" (집 밥) feat. Geeks, Mrs. Kim	2014	17	—N/a†	—	KOR: 197,682	Him
"Pain Poem" (서툰 시)	2016	97	—N/a†	—	KOR: 26,548	SM Station Season 1
"I Love You" (난 널 사랑해)	2018	—	—	—	—	re.MAKE20 #1 single album
"Shattered" (와르르)	2019	175	—	—	—	Non-album single
Collaborations
"Taste of Separation" (이별의 맛) with Sim Hyun-Bo	2009	—N/a*	—N/a†	—		Non-album single
"Different" (달라) with Taeyeon	2011	2	—	—	KOR: 1,109,724	Solista Part 2
"Person, Love" (사람, 사랑) with Lena Park	2011	6	20	—	KOR: 870,011	Non-album single
"White Winter" (하얀 겨울) with Lena Park	2012	7	—	—	KOR: 674,881	Non-album single
"Going to You" (너에게 간다) with Yoon Jong-shin	2013	52	—	—	KOR: 73,352	Yoon Jong-shin Monthly Project May 2013
"—" denotes song did not chart or was not released in that region. * The Gaon Digital Chart was established in 2010. † The Kpop Hot 100 was established in 2011, discontinued in 2014, and re-established in 2017.

== Soundtrack appearances ==
Title	Year	Peak chart positions		Sales	Album
Title	Year	KOR Gaon	KOR Hot 100	Sales	Album
"A Story Sadder Than Sadness"	2008	—N/a*	—N/a†		More Than Blue OST
"Loving You"	2010	87	—N/a†		Giant OST
"Appear (나타나)"	2010	45	—N/a†		Secret Garden OST
"Though I Don't Say It" (말하지 않아도)	2011	19	16	KOR: 652,230	Deep Rooted Tree OST
"Callus" (굳은살)	2012	63	55	KOR: 55,732	The Chaser OST
"Only You" (오직 너만)	2015	16	—N/a†	KOR: 177,075	Hyde Jekyll, Me OST
"Love Begins With a Confession"	2015	11	—N/a†	KOR: 442,157	The Producers OST
"I Love You" (사랑해요)	2016	19	—N/a†	KOR: 373,583	Uncontrollably Fond OST
"Amnesia" (기억상실증)	2017	—	—	—	Saimdang, Memoir of Colors OST
"Winter of May" (오월의 겨울)	2021	—	—	—	Youth of May OST
"—" denotes song did not chart or was not released in that region. * The Gaon Digital Chart was established in 2010. † The Kpop Hot 100 was established in 2011, discontinued in 2014, and re-established in 2017.

== Covers ==
Title	Year	Peak chart positions		Sales	Album
Title	Year	KOR Gaon	KOR Hot 100	Sales	Album
"I Loved But..." (사랑했지만) originally by Kim Kwang-seok	2011	17	52	KOR: 389,369	I Am a Singer
"Never Ending Story" originally by Boohwal	2011	41	—	KOR: 809,820	I Am a Singer
"Please" (제발) originally by Lee So-ra	2011	57	—	KOR: 2,848,317	I Am a Singer
"Scars Deeper Than Love" (사랑보다 깊은 상처) with Lena Park, originally by Lena Park	2011	10	20	KOR: 672,220	I Am a Singer
"Swamp" (늪) originally by Jo Kwan-woo	2011	3	—	KOR: 1,656,985	I Am a Singer
"I Love You" (사랑하오) originally by Kim Hyun-chul, Yoon Sang	2011	20	—	KOR: 638,584	I Am a Singer
"To Be Alone" (홀로 된다는 것) originally by Byun Jin-sub	2011	8	22	KOR: 473,480	I Am a Singer
"Wet Firewood" (희나리) originally by Koo Chang-mo	2011	10	76	KOR: 677,548	I Am a Singer
"With You" (님과 함께) originally by Nam Jin	2011	6	—	KOR: 836,767	I Am a Singer
"I Have a Lover" (애인 있어요) originally by Lee Eun-mi	2012	7	13		I'm 21 Part 3 single album
"—" denotes song did not chart or was not released in that region.

== Other charted songs ==
Title	Year	Peak chart positions	Sales	Album
Title	Year	KOR Gaon	Sales	Album
"My Baby (Feat. Wheesung)"	2012	61	KOR: 175,853	Solista Part 2
"Walking on the Memory" (기억을 걷다)	2012	78	KOR: 75,900	Solista Part 2
"I Wish This Rain Would Stop" (이 비가 그치길 바래)	2012	93	KOR: 59,624	Solista Part 2
