= When Women Powder Twice =

2011 South Korean television series

- Promotional poster
- Hangul: 여자가 두번 화장할 때
- RR: Yeojaga dubeon hwajanghal ttae
- MR: Yŏjaga tubŏn hwajanghal ttae
- Genre: Drama
- Written by: Ji Sang-hak
- Directed by: Han Jung-hee
- Starring: Danny Ahn; Im Jung-eun; Ahn Jae-mo; Lim Yeo-won
- Country of origin: South Korea
- Original language: Korean
- No. of episodes: 85

Production
- Executive producer: Yoo Jung-joon
- Producer: Yoon Jae-won
- Running time: 35 minutes

Original release
- Network: JTBC
- Release: December 5, 2011 – April 4, 2012

When Women Powder Twice (Korean: 여자가 두번 화장할 때; RR: Yeojaga dubeon hwajanghal ttae) is a 2011–2012 South Korean television series starring Danny Ahn, Im Jung-eun, Ahn Jae-mo and Lim Yeo-won. It aired on JTBC's Monday–Friday time slot from December 5, 2011 to March 7, 2012.

== Synopsis ==
Suzy Hamilton (Im Jung-eun), who was adopted by Americans when she was young, falls in love with Joon-soo (Kang Sung-jin) and gets pregnant. When he abandons her and goes back to South Korea, she follows him and meets a rich woman named Young-woo (Ahn Jae-mo). With her help, she prepares her revenge. During the process, she falls in love with Han Sun-woo (Danny Ahn), Young-woo's brother.

== Cast ==
=== Main ===
- Danny Ahn as Han Sun-woo
- Im Jung-eun as Suzy Hamilton
- Ahn Jae-mo as Han Young-woo
- Lim Yeo-won

=== Supporting ===
- Kang Sung-jin as Joon-soo
- Shin Soo-yeon as So-young
- Kim Chang-sook
- Yeon Kyu-jin
- Eom Yoo-shin
- Cha Hyun-jung
- Shin Woo-chul
- Ryu Sung-hoon
- Lee Hye-ri

== Original soundtrack ==
Released on March 29, 2012
No.	Title	Artist	Length
1.	"Are You Okay?" (괜찮은가요?)	Barbara	3:50
2.	"Parting and Longing" (이별 그리고 그리움)	Park Ji-soo and Lee Ji-soo	3:56
3.	"Don't Forget" (잊지 말아요)	JN	4:00
4.	"I Was Hurt" (아프고 아파서)	Da-rae	4:01
Total length:			15:47

== Production ==
The series was originally scheduled to air for 120 episodes but, due to the low ratings, it was cut down by 55 episodes, bringing the total number of episodes to 65.
