= Once Upon a Time (2008 film) =

- Theatrical poster
- Directed by: Jeong Yong-ki
- Written by: Cheon Seong-il
- Produced by: Kang Hyun-woo
- Starring: Park Yong-woo; Lee Bo-young
- Cinematography: Moon Yong-sik
- Edited by: Kim Sun-min
- Music by: Kim Woo-chul
- Distributed by: CH Entertainment
- Release date: January 30, 2008
- Running time: 110 minutes
- Country: South Korea
- Language: Korean
- Box office: US$10.6 million

Once Upon a Time (Korean: 원스 어폰 어 타임) is a 2008 South Korean film, directed by Jeong Yong-ki and adapted from a screenplay by Cheon Seong-il. The film is a heist comedy film set in 1940s Korea, and stars Park Yong-woo and Lee Bo-young as a con artist and a jazz singer, respectively, who each plot to steal a valuable diamond from the Japanese authorities. Once Upon a Time was the first major investment by SK Telecom's film division, established late 2007, and was released in South Korea on January 30, 2008, under the company's CH Entertainment banner.

== Plot ==
The film is set in Seoul, 1945, during the final days of Japanese rule. Kanemura is a well-connected con artist who makes money by selling ancient Korean artifacts to wealthy Japanese collectors. His eyes are set on Haruko, a beautiful jazz singer in a downtown nightclub; unbeknownst to anyone, Haruko has been moonlighting as "Haedanghwa" ("Rugosa Rose"), a cat burglar who has carried out a succession of high-profile thefts. She is also pursued by Yamada, a colonel in the Japanese military police, who is jealous of Kanemura's affections towards her. The owner of the nightclub and his chef, Hee-bong, secretly work for the Korean independence movement.

After a twenty-year search, the Japanese Chief of State—a high-ranking official in Korea—has recovered the "Light of the East", a 3,000 carats (600 g) diamond and lost treasure from the ancient kingdom of Silla. Receiving orders to send the diamond to Japan, a lavish send-off party is arranged. Kanemura attends the event with Haruko; he plans to steal the diamond, but she has the same idea, and both are surprised to see the other when they get to the safe where it is kept. After a brief struggle, it is Haruko who makes her escape with the diamond, leaving Kanemura to face the authorities. But the nightclub owner and his chef are also at the party, and their bungled assassination attempt on the Chief of State results in a fire, allowing Kanemura to slip away in the confusion.

Yamada is given the task of retrieving the diamond, much to the chagrin of Suzimura, the chief of police, who feels that he has jurisdiction. Hasekawa, a police inspector, immediately suspects Haruko, but Yamada won't hear of it, blinded by his feelings for her. Meanwhile, Kanemura manages to track down Haruko, finding her on a train to Soviet Russia disguised as a geisha. She refuses to hand over the diamond, but he has planted explosives on the railway track, and, having cut off her escape route, succeeds in dragging her back to Seoul.

Unable to discover the diamond's whereabouts, Yamada rounds up 100 Korean civilians and orders them to be executed if it is not returned. Kanemura is also unsuccessful in getting Haruko to give up the diamond, so he allows her to slip away and then secretly follows her. She leads him to a local pawn shop, but her accomplice Jang-cheon is really an agent of the Korean independence movement, and when Kanemura reveals himself as the leader of the Korean secret intelligence, the two men turn against her. Disguised in Japanese military uniforms and with the diamond now in their possession, they are about to make their getaway when Hasekawa arrives on the scene and holds them at gunpoint. Suzimura and his other police officers soon follow, but he misreads the situation; believing Hasekawa to be a traitor who has taken Japanese soldiers captive, he orders his men to shoot him. This allows Kanemura and Jang-cheon to escape through a hidden tunnel, but Haruko is captured.

Jang-cheon thinks that he has the diamond, but Kanemura has switched it, and, feigning injury, he tells Jang-cheon to go on without him; he does, but is soon after arrested and thrown in with the other hostages. Now on his own, Kanemura negotiates a deal with the Chief of State: he will return the diamond in exchange for Haruko and ten crates of gold. Yamada is sent to make the exchange, but the Chief is stopped by the chef and nightclub owner, who are trying to make good on their assassination attempt. The two independence fighters are injured in a shootout with Japanese soldiers, but succeed in their objective, blowing up the Chief's car. Yamada makes the exchange with Kamemura, but attempts to double cross him, and the two men fight. The diamond is broken, and Kanemura manages to escape with Haruko and the gold. He later reveals that the diamond was in fact a fake, and that he manipulated the whole event to secure gold from the Japanese for the purposes of rebuilding Korea. Back in Seoul, the execution of civilians is halted by the radio broadcast announcing the surrender of Japan.

== Cast ==
Note: While most characters in the film are Korean, some are referred to by both their Japanese name and Korean name. For the historical context of forced name changes in Korea during this period, see Sōshi-kaimei.

- Park Yong-woo as Kanemura (Korean name: Oh Bong-gu)
- Lee Bo-young as Haruko (Korean name: Choon-ja)
- Kim Su-hyeon as Yamada
- Sung Dong-il as the nightclub owner
- Kim Eung-soo as the Chief of State
- Ahn Gil-kang as Jang-cheon
- Jo Hee-bong as Hee-bong, the cook
- Kim Goo-taek as Suzimura (Korean name: Hwang Choon-duk)
- Kim Hyeong-beom as Hasekawa (Korean name: Oh Duk-soo)

== Release ==
Once Upon a Time was released in South Korea on January 30, 2008, and was ranked third at the box office on its opening weekend, grossing US$1,971,473. It topped the box office on its second weekend, and by March 23 had grossed a total of US$10,614,012. As of March 31, 2008, the total number of tickets sold was 1,562,752. It was released on DVD in South Korea on March 31, 2008.

The film screened at the 7th New York Korean Film Festival, which took place in August 2008. It was also shown at the Hawaii International Film Festival's 2008 Summer Fest, held during the same month.

== Critical reception ==
In a review for the Korean Film Council, Yi Ch'ang-ho described Once Upon a Time as being "technically excellent" and "a well balanced heist comedy," also praising the film for its use of music and portrayal of 1940s Korea. Yang Sung-jin of The Korea Herald commended the "solid performances of the leading characters," while also giving credit to the comic relief provided by supporting actors Sung Dong-il and Jo Hee-bong. Susan Yoon of the Korea JoongAng Daily noted that although the film shows the harsh realities of life under Japanese colonialism, it could also be enjoyed as a comedy "because it focuses on personal journeys, not just historical events," and that the film was "Funny from beginning to end," with "a delightful finish." James Mudge of BeyondHollywood.com regarded Jeong's direction as being "slick and confident throughout," and commented that while the film lacked originality, "it stands as a solid, entertaining action comedy that should be enjoyed by all."

== Awards and nominations ==
Lee Bo-young was nominated for Best New Actress at the 44th Baeksang Arts Awards. Yang Min-hye was also nominated for Best Costume Design at the 45th Grand Bell Awards.
