= Lee Jeong-beom =

South Korean filmmaker (born 1971)

- Born: September 21, 1971 (age 54); South Korea
- Education: Korea National University of Arts - Film
- Occupations: Film director, screenwriter

Korean name
- Hangul: 이정범
- RR: I Jeongbeom
- MR: I Chŏngbŏm

Lee Jeong-beom (Korean: 이정범; born September 21, 1971) is a South Korean film director and screenwriter. He is best known for such films as Cruel Winter Blues (2006) and The Man from Nowhere (2010). With more than 6 million admissions and a revenue of ₩47.1 billion, The Man from Nowhere was the best-selling film (domestic and foreign) in Korea in 2010.

== Filmography ==
- Jo Pil-ho: The Dawning Rage (2019) – director, screenplay
- No Tears for the Dead (2014) - director, screenplay
- Hoya (2011) - cameo
- The Man from Nowhere (2010) - director, screenplay
- Cruel Winter Blues (2006) - director, screenplay
- Goodbye Day (short film, 2003) - director, screenplay, editor
- The Last Night (short film, 2002) - PD
- Gwihyu (short film, 2001) - director, screenplay, editor

== Awards ==
- 2011 8th Max Movie Awards: Best Director (The Man from Nowhere)
- 2010 6th University Film Festival of Korea: Best Director (The Man from Nowhere)
- 2007 15th Chunsa Film Art Awards: Best New Director (Cruel Winter Blues)
