= Joseon X-Files =

2010 South Korean television series

- Promotional poster for Joseon X-Files
- Also known as: Secret Investigation Records; Joseon X-Files: Secret Book
- Hangul: 기찰비록
- Hanja: 奇察秘錄
- RR: Gichalbirok
- MR: Kich'albirok
- Genre: Period drama Mystery; Science fiction Drama
- Written by: Kim Nam; Kim Jung-hee; Ha Won-gi; Lee Dong-gyu; Hong Seung-yeon; Ham Chang-seok; Park Doo-il
- Directed by: Kim Heung-dong; Kang Kyung-hoon
- Starring: Kim Ji-hoon; Im Jung-eun; Kim Kap-soo; Jo Hee-bong
- Country of origin: South Korea
- Original language: Korean
- No. of episodes: 12

Production
- Producers: Ahn Hoon-chan; Song Jin-hwa
- Running time: Fridays at 24:00 (KST)
- Production company: MBC Production

Original release
- Network: tvN
- Release: 20 August – 29 October 2010

Joseon X-Files (Korean: 기찰비록) is a 2010 South Korean television series starring Kim Ji-hoon, Im Jung-eun, Kim Kap-soo and Jo Hee-bong. It aired on tvN from August 20 to October 29, 2010, on Fridays at 24:00 for 12 episodes.

The historical drama is based on cases detailed in the Annals of the Joseon Dynasty while incorporating mysterious and supernatural elements.

The original Korean title's literal translation is Secret Investigation Records, and the series is also known as Joseon X-Files: Secret Book (조선X파일: 기찰비록; JoseonXpail: gichalbirok).

== Plot ==
Mysterious incidents are recorded in the Annals of the Joseon Dynasty that cannot be explained through science.

In this Joseon-era alternate history, Kim Hyung-do (Kim Ji-hoon) is an inspector with a strong focus on investigating into administrative misdeeds. This brings him into direct contact with a secret organization within the government. Dealing with strange, paranormal and possibly alien phenomena, the duty of this organization is to keep everything under control, leaving only secret records. Occurring during the reign of King Gwanghae, the episodes make various allusions to the political turmoils of the period. These individual stories are:

E01–02: The Secret Light (Parts 1 & 2)
E03: The Curse of Shilla's Gold
E04: Behind Those Crimson Eyes
E05: The Sealed Tale
E06: Ghosts at Yi Du's House
E07: The Four Dimensions Village
E08: The Immortal Prophet
E09: Attack of the Changgwi
E10: Return to Dragon Palace
E11-E12: The Rebirth of the Dubak God (Parts 1 & 2)

In these various contexts, investigator Kim Hyung-do avoids superstition and searches for realistic explanations while investigator Heo Yoon-yi (Im Jung-eun) is more open to supernatural possibilities, including secrets of her own. The finale doesn't explain everything. Kim Hyung-do's last reply to Heo Yoon-yi is only "I know who you are".

== Cast ==
=== Main ===
- Kim Ji-hoon as Kim Hyung-do, inspector of the Saheonbu, senior 6th rank.
- Im Jung-eun as Heo Yoon-yi, bookshop owner, the other inquirer.
- Jo Hee-bong as Jang Man, adjutant of Kim Hyung-do.
- Kim Kap-soo as Ji Seung, one of the six Royal Secretaries, 3rd senior rank. Head of the inquirers.

=== Cameos ===
83 other actors are named in the hard-subbed credits. Among them:

- Noh Young-guk as Yi Hyeong-wuk, revoked governor of the Gangwon Province, former teacher of Kim Hyung-do (E01–02).
- Jo Jung-eun as Suk-mi, daughter of the magistrate and lover of the cursed boy (E04)
- Yun Jong-hwa as Oh Gyeong-wun, son of Baek-yi, writer of prophetic stories (E05)
- Jo An as Bu-ok, the gisaeng from a previous life (E05)
- Jeon So-min as shaman Choi Eui-shin, avenging her father (E06)
- Kim Eung-soo as Yi Du, Chief of Royal Palace Guards (E06, E08)
- Jang Dae-yoon as Lee Bang-hyeon, the mercy killer (E09)
- Kim Ji-won as Ja-geun, little girl at Noryang Island (E10)
- Myung Gye-nam as Eo Sun-kwon, the mayor of the island (E10)
- Kim Yoon-tae as Kang Yu-seok, deceased leader of the Dubak sect (E11–12)
- Go Seo-hee as Su-hee, head shaman, daughter of Kang Yu-seok (E11–12)
- Choi Min as executive of the Dubak sect (E11–12)
