= Friends (2002 TV series) =

2002 South Korean-Japanese drama

- Official poster
- Directed by: Nobuhiro Doi; Han Chul-soo
- Starring: Won Bin; Kyoko Fukada
- Country of origin: South Korea; Japan
- No. of episodes: 4

Production
- Running time: 129 minutes (per 2 episodes)

Original release
- Network: TBS; MBC
- Release: February 4 – February 5, 2002

Friends (Korean: 프렌즈; Japanese: フレンズ) is a 2002 South Korean–Japanese television series starring Won Bin and Kyoko Fukada. The four-episode series was co-produced by TBS (Japan) and MBC (South Korea). This was the first time in history that the two countries collaborated on a series. It was originally broadcast on February 4–5 in Japan and February 15–16 in South Korea.

== Plot ==
Tomoko, a Japanese tourist, and Ji-hoon, a South Korean film student and aspiring movie director, meet in Hong Kong. Despite a rocky meeting and the language barrier, they become friends. Over time, they eventually head back to their respective countries but only after exchanging email addresses, promising to keep in touch and meeting again. Tomoko decides to go to Korea to work as a tour guide and sees Ji-hoon again, but problems occur.

== Cast ==
=== Korean ===
- Won Bin as Kim Ji Hoon
- Lee Dong-gun as Park Kyoung-joo
- Han Hye-jin as Park Hye-jin
- Dokgo Young-jae as Gyu-han
- Sunwoo Eun-sook as Soo-kyung

=== Japanese ===
- Kyoko Fukada as Tomoko Asai
- Akiko Yada as Yuko Yamagishi
- Naho Toda as Midori Kaneda
- Yukiyoshi Ozawa as Shota Sakamaki
- Keiko Takeshita as Satoko Asai

== Production ==
The series was created to commemorate the 2002 FIFA World Cup, which was co-hosted by South Korea and Japan. Filming took about two years. Episodes one and two were produced by TBS, and episodes three and four were produced by MBC.
