= Shin Ha-kyun =

South Korean actor (born 1974)

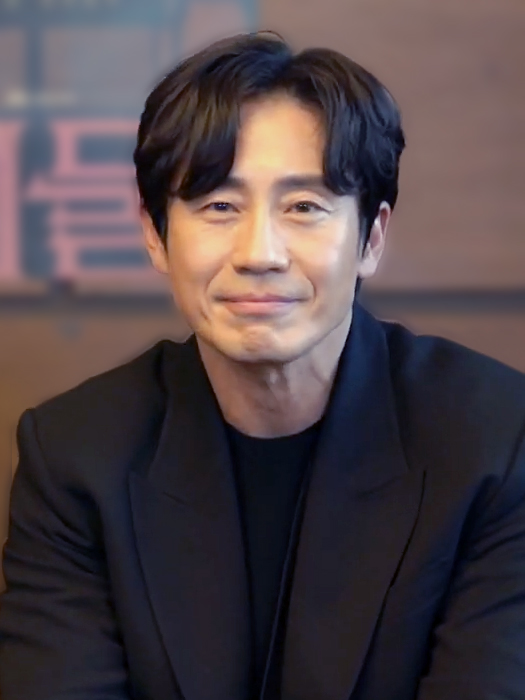
- Shin in 2021
- Born: May 30, 1974 (age 52); Jungnang-gu, Seoul, South Korea
- Education: Seoul Institute of the Arts
- Occupation: Actor
- Years active: 1998–present
- Agent: Hodoo

Korean name
- Hangul: 신하균
- Hanja: 申河均
- RR: Sin Hagyun
- MR: Sin Hagyun

Shin Ha-kyun (Korean: 신하균; born May 30, 1974) is a South Korean actor. He first gained recognition for his role in Joint Security Area (2000), followed by notable performances in Sympathy for Mr. Vengeance (2002), Save the Green Planet! (2003), and Welcome to Dongmakgol (2005). Shin has also been active in television, earning praise for his roles in Brain (2011), Less Than Evil (2018–2019), and Beyond Evil (2021), the latter of which earned him the Baeksang Arts Award for Best Actor.

His more recent works include the box-office hit Extreme Job (2019), the heartwarming drama Inseparable Bros (2019), and the legal drama The Auditors (2024).

== Career ==
Shin Ha-kyun first trained as a stage actor at the Seoul Institute of the Arts before acting in a large number of plays by Jang Jin. Shin was cast in Jang's first movie, The Happenings, and he has since appeared in almost all of Jang's feature films. Impressed by his acting abilities, director Kim Jee-woon cast him in minor roles in The Foul King and his 30-minute internet film Coming Out.

Shin first became a superstar with his role as a young North Korea soldier in Park Chan-wook's smash hit Joint Security Area in late 2000. He developed a large fan following which, together with that of co-star Won Bin, helped make his next film Guns & Talks a huge commercial hit.

In Park Chan-wook's acclaimed 2002 film, Sympathy for Mr. Vengeance, Shin played a deaf man with bright green dyed hair who is driven by desperation to kidnap a young girl. In Jang Joon-hwan's Save the Green Planet! (2003), Shin played a mentally unbalanced man who believes that aliens are plotting to invade the earth.

Also noteworthy are Shin's performances in two films set during the Korean War: Welcome to Dongmakgol, a dramedy that takes place in a small mountainous village, and The Front Line, a harrowing tale of soldiers fighting over a small, heavily-contested hill which frequently changes hands. His other film roles include: a developmentally disabled man in My Brother, a rural postman in A Letter From Mars, a suspect under interrogation in Murder, Take One, an eccentric hitman in No Mercy for the Rude, a struggling artist who makes an unwise bet in The Devil's Game, a sickly cuckolded husband in Thirst, a macho cop in Foxy Festival, and a music teacher involved in an affair in Cafe Noir.

Primarily a film actor, Shin's first TV series was 2003's Good Person on MBC. In 2010 he returned to television in Golden House. His portrayal of a cold, ambitious neurosurgeon in the 2011 medical drama Brain, brought him new levels of popularity. For his performance in Brain, he won the Grand Prize ("Daesang") at the KBS Drama Awards.

In 2013, Shin headlined the romantic comedy series All About My Romance about two legislators from rival political parties who fall in love, followed by the high-profile action film Running Man about an ordinary man forced to become a fugitive after he gets framed for murder.

He then played a septuagenarian whose body magically reverts to his thirties in the 2014 romantic comedy series Mr. Back. Shin’s next turn was as a villainous mastermind game planner in the action-thriller Big Match. In 2015, he headlined his first period film with Empire of Lust, playing a distinguished admiral of the recently established Joseon empire.

In 2016, Shin starred in the police procedural crime drama Piped Piper (2016), playing a negotiator. He then starred in the comedy film Detour, followed with comedy thriller Room No.7. He also played a supporting role in the action film The Villainess co-starring Kim Ok-vin.

In 2018, Shin starred in the romantic comedy What a Man Wants. The same year, he was cast in the comedy film Inseparable Bros. He returned to the small screen in the Korean remake of the British crime drama Luther.

In 2020, Shin starred in the medical drama Soul Mechanic.

In 2021, Shin starred in the psychological thriller drama Beyond Evil, directed by Shim Na-yeon, as an impulsive and eccentric police officer. His performance earned him the award for Best Actor - Television at 57th Baeksang Arts Awards.

In 2022, he appeared in the mystery-thriller film Anchor and in the Coupang Play sitcom Unicorn.

== Personal life ==
His niece, Park Eun-young, is a former member of the Korean idol group Brave Girls.

Shin and Kim Go-eun were in a relationship from 2016 to 2017.

== Filmography ==
Key
†	Denotes films that have not yet been released

=== Film ===
Year	Title		Role	Note	Ref.
Year	English	Korean	Role	Note	Ref.
1998	The Happenings	기막힌 사내들	Kim Choo-rak		
1999	The Spy	간첩 리철진	Oh Woo-yeol		
2000	The Foul King	반칙왕	Bully	Cameo	
2000	Coming Out	커밍 아웃	Jae-min	Short film	
2000	Joint Security Area	공동경비구역 JSA	Jung Woo-jin		
2001	Guns & Talks	킬러들의 수다	Jung-woo		
2002	Sympathy for Mr. Vengeance	복수는 나의 것	Ryu		
2002	Surprise	서프라이즈	Kim Jung-woo		
2003	Save the Green Planet!	지구를 지켜라!	Lee Byung-gu		
2003	A Man Who Went to Mars	화성으로 간 사나이	Lee Seung-jae		
2004	My Brother	우리형	Kim Sung-hyun		
2004	Hair	털	Kang Woon-do	Short film	
2005	Lady Vengeance	친절한 금자씨	Hired assassin #2	Cameo	
2005	Welcome to Dongmakgol	웰컴 투 동막골	Pyo Hyun-chul		
2005	Murder, Take One	박수칠 때 떠나라	Kim Young-hoon		
2006	No Mercy for the Rude	예의없는 것들	Killa		
2007	My Son	아들	Uncle Goose	Voice cameo	
2008	The Devil's Game	더 게임	Min Hee-do		
2009	Thirst	박쥐	Kang-woo		
2010	The Quiz Show Scandal	퀴즈왕	Ph.D.	Cameo	
2010	Foxy Festival	페스티발	Kwak Jang-bae		
2010	Cafe Noir	카페 느와르	Young-soo		
2011	The Front Line	고지전	Kang Eun-pyo		
2012	The Thieves	도둑들	Lee Ha-cheol	Cameo	
2013	Running Man	런닝맨	Cha Jong-woo		
2014	Big Match	빅매치	Ace		
2015	Empire of Lust	순수의 시대	Kim Min-jae		
2016	Detour	올레	Joong-pil		
2017	The Villainess	악녀	Joong-sang		
2017	Room No.7	7호실	Doo-shik		
2018	What a Man Wants	바람 바람 바람	Bong-soo		
2019	Extreme Job	극한직업	Lee Moo-bae		
2019	Inseparable Bros	나의 특별한 형제	Kang Se-ha		
2019	Present	선물	Sang-goo	Short film	
2020	Mr. Zoo: The Missing VIP	미스터 주: 사라진 VIP	Ali (voice)		
2022	Anchor	앵커	In-ho		
2026	Wild Sing	와일드 씽	Park Yong-gu	Special appearance	

=== Television series ===
Year	Title		Role	Ref.
Year	English	Korean	Role	Ref.
2003	Good Person	좋은 사람	Park Joon-pil	
2010	Golden House	위기일발 풍년빌라	Oh Bok-kyu	
2011–2012	Brain	브레인	Lee Kang-hoon	
2013	All About My Romance	내 연애의 모든 것	Kim Soo-young	
2014	Mr. Back	미스터 백	Choi Go-bong / Choi Shin-hyung	
2016	Pied Piper	피리부는 사나이	Joo Sung-chan	
2018–2019	Less Than Evil	나쁜 형사	Woo Tae-seok	
2020	Soul Mechanic	영혼수선공	Lee Shi-joon	
2021	Beyond Evil	괴물	Lee Dong-sik	
2022	Unicorn	유니콘	CEO Steve	
2022	Yonder	욘더	Jae-hyun	
2023	Evilive	악인전기	Han Dong-soo	
2024	The Auditors	감사합니다	Shin Cha-il	
2026	Fifties Professionals	오십프로	Jeong Heo-myung	

=== Music video appearances ===
Year	Title		Artist
Year	English	Korean	Artist
2000	"I Love You" with Cha Seung-won		Position (포지션)
2004	"Hwi-li-li"	휠릴리	Lee Soo-young
2004	"Andante"	안단테	Lee Soo-young
2010	"Just Laugh"	웃음만	Zia

== Stage ==
=== Theater ===
List of Theater Play(s)
Year	Title		Role	Theater	Date	Ref.
Year	English	Korean	Role	Theater	Date	Ref.
1993	Dropping a bomb	폭탄 투하 중				
1997	Taxi Driver - Where are you going?	택시 드리벌 - 당신은 어디까지 가십니까?	Passenger one (어깨1), drunk passenger (취객), Protest student (시위학생)	Arts and Culture Center Small Theater	February 27 – March 18	
1997	(21st) Seoul Theater Festival: Taxi Driver - Where are you going?	(제21회) 서울연극제: 택시 드리벌 - 당신은 어디까지 가십니까?	Passenger one (어깨1), drunk passenger (취객), Protest student (시위학생)	Arts and Culture Center Small Theater	October 10–15	
1998	Magic Time	매직타임	Ha-kyun (하균)			
1999	Heotang	허탕	Yoo Dal-soo (유달수)	Academic Green Small Theater	August 7 to October 31	
2000	Leave When They're Applauding	박수칠 때 떠나라	The bellboy (벨보이)	LG Arts Center	June 16–30	
2002	Welcome to Dongmakgol	웰컴 투 동막골	Pyo Hyun-chul (표현철)	LG Arts Center	December 14–29	

== Discography ==
=== Soundtrack appearances ===
Soundtrack appearances
Year	Title		Artist	Music	Album
Year	English	Korean	Artist	Music	Album
2004	"Brother's Letter"	형의 편지	Shin Ha-kyun; Won Bin	Don Spike	My Brother OST
2005	"Interogation"	심문(審問)	Shin Ha-kyun; Cha Seung-won	Han Jae-kwon	Murder, Take One OST
2019	"Happy"		Shin Ha-kyun; Lee Kwang-soo; Esom	Korean Version: 17Holic; Yug Sang-hyo; Original Song: Mocca	Inseparable Bros OST
2020	"Sigh"	휴(休)	Shin Ha-kyun; BIG Naughty	Shin Ha-kyun; BIG Naughty	Soul Mechanic OST

== Accolades ==
=== Awards and nominations ===
Year	Award	Category	Nominated work	Result
2000	3rd Director's Cut Awards	Best New Actor	Joint Security Area	Won
2000	8th Chunsa Film Art Awards	Best Supporting Actor	Joint Security Area	Won
2000	21st Blue Dragon Film Awards	Best Supporting Actor	Joint Security Area	Won
2001	38th Grand Bell Awards	Best Supporting Actor	Joint Security Area	Nominated
2001	22nd Blue Dragon Film Awards	Best Supporting Actor	Guns & Talks	Nominated
2001	16th Golden Disk Awards	Popular Music Video Award	Position – I Love You	Won
2003	4th Busan Film Critics Awards	Best Actor	Save the Green Planet!	Won
2003	2nd Korean Film Awards	Best Actor	Save the Green Planet!	Nominated
2009	30th Blue Dragon Film Awards	Best Supporting Actor	Thirst	Nominated
2011	KBS Drama Awards	Grand Prize (Daesang)	Brain	Won
2011	KBS Drama Awards	Top Excellence Award, Actor	Brain	Nominated
2011	KBS Drama Awards	Excellence Award, Actor in a Miniseries	Brain	Nominated
2011	KBS Drama Awards	Netizen Award, Actor	Brain	Won
2011	KBS Drama Awards	Best Couple Award with Choi Jung-won	Brain	Won
2012	48th Baeksang Arts Awards	Best Actor (TV)	Brain	Nominated
2012	7th Seoul International Drama Awards	Best Actor	Brain	Nominated
2012	24th Korean PD Awards	Best Actor	Brain	Won
2012	1st K-Drama Star Awards	Top Excellence Award, Actor	Brain	Nominated
2013	SBS Drama Awards	Top Excellence Award, Actor in a Miniseries	All About My Romance	Nominated
2014	MBC Drama Awards	Top Excellence Award, Actor in a Miniseries	Mr. Back	Nominated
2014	MBC Drama Awards	Popularity Award, Actor	Mr. Back	Won
2018	MBC Drama Awards	Grand Prize (Daesang)	Less Than Evil	Nominated
2018	MBC Drama Awards	Top Excellence Award, Actor in a Monday-Tuesday Drama	Less Than Evil	Won
2018	MBC Drama Awards	In Awe Award	Less Than Evil	Won
2019	39th Korean Association of Film Critics Awards	Best Actor	Inseparable Bros	Won
2020	34th KBS Drama Awards	Top Excellence Award, Actor	Soul Mechanic	Nominated
2020	34th KBS Drama Awards	Excellence Award, Actor in a Miniseries	Soul Mechanic	Nominated
2021	57th Baeksang Arts Awards	Best Actor (TV)	Beyond Evil	Won

=== State honors ===
Name of country, year given, and name of honor
Country Or Organization	Year	Honor Or Award	Ref.
National Tax Service	2007	41st Taxpayer's Day — Exemplary Taxpayer Commendation	
