= Guns & Talks =

2001 South Korean film directed by Jang Jin

- Theatrical release poster
- Hangul: 킬러들의 수다
- RR: Killeodeurui suda
- MR: K'illŏdŭrŭi suda
- Directed by: Jang Jin
- Written by: Jang Jin
- Produced by: Kang Woo-suk
- Starring: Shin Hyun-joon; Shin Ha-kyun; Won Bin; Jung Jae-young; Jung Jin-young
- Cinematography: Hong Kyung-pyo
- Edited by: Kim Sang-bum
- Music by: Han Jae-kwon
- Distributed by: Cinema Service
- Release date: 12 October 2001
- Running time: 120 minutes
- Country: South Korea
- Language: Korean

Guns & Talks is a 2001 South Korean action comedy film written and directed by Jang Jin. Starring Shin Hyun-joon, Shin Ha-kyun, Won Bin, Jung Jae-young and Jung Jin-young, the black comedy is about a group of four assassins-for-hire, with a dogged prosecutor on their trail.

== Plot ==
In the middle of downtown Seoul, mysterious bombings and murders are taking place. Four men leave a crime scene, skillfully evading the police. This eccentric band of killers consists of team leader Sang-yeon (Shin Hyun-joon), bomb specialist Jung-woo (Shin Ha-kyun), sniper Jae-young (Jung Jae-young), and computer hacker Ha-yoon (Won Bin). These hitmen believe they're doing a vital job in society, just like any other profession. They run a private business where people from all walks of life come to them and place an order. After they meet their clients and discuss the time, place and method by which they want their targets to be eliminated, they sign a formal contract. They even have a discount rate for students. When the deal is done, they carry out their mission and finish it like a typical day at work. The four live and work together in mundane harmony, eating Ha-yoon's bad cooking and watching their crush (Go Eun-mi) read the news on TV. One day, a persistent high school girl (Gong Hyo-jin) shows up at their door and keeps trying to hire them, while Jung-woo falls for his target, a pregnant woman (Oh Seung-hyun). Then Sang-yeon gets approached for a big job he can't turn down, one far riskier than what they're used to. The client wants someone killed in the middle of a sold-out Hamlet play with high-profile businessmen, politicians and law officers in attendance. Meanwhile, the determined and intelligent prosecutor Jo (Jung Jin-young) is on to them, and mobilizes the police force to catch them in the act.

== Cast ==
- Shin Hyun-joon as Sang-yeon
- Shin Ha-kyun as Jung-woo
- Won Bin as Ha-yoon
- Jung Jae-young as Jae-young
- Jung Jin-young as Prosecutor Jo
- Oh Seung-hyun as Hwa-yi
- Gong Hyo-jin as Yeo-il
- Ko Eun-mi as Oh Young-ran
- Jung Gyu-soo as Detective Kim
- Kim Hak-chul as Chief Choi
- Yoon Joo-sang as Mr. Ju
- Son Hyun-joo as Tak Mun-bae
- Jo Deok-hyun as thug
- Min Yoon-jung as Detective Jin
- Im Seung-dae as Hwa-yi's lover
- Lee Ha-ra as secretary of Hwa-yi's lover
- Kim Ji-young as grandmother
- Kim Il-woong as man in Mercedes Benz
- Ryoo Seung-bum as motorcyclist
- Im Won-hee as priest
- Song Geum-sik as man 1
- Kim Young-woong as man 2
- Heo Ki-ho as man 3
- Yang Dong-jae as man 4
- Park Kyung-won as agent 1
- Kim Joon-seok as agent 2
- Kim Young-hoon as agent 3
- Park Jin-taek as agent 4
- Seon Hak as agent 5
- Kim Min-kyo as soldier 2

== Reception ==
The film was released in South Korea on 12 October 2001 and topped the box office for three weeks. It was the No. 7 best selling domestic movie in South Korea in 2001 with 2,227,000 admissions.
