= I Am Happy =

2009 South Korean drama film

- Theatrical release poster
- Hangul: 나는 행복합니다
- RR: Naneun haengbokhamnida
- MR: Nanŭn haengbokhamnida
- Directed by: Yoon Jong-chan
- Screenplay by: Yoon Jong-chan
- Based on: Mr. Cho, Man-deuk by Yi Chong-jun
- Produced by: Yoon Il-joong; Bae Yong-guk
- Starring: Hyun Bin; Lee Bo-young
- Cinematography: Lee Chang-jae
- Edited by: Kyung Min-ho
- Music by: Kim Dong-ki
- Distributed by: Jinjin Pictures
- Release date: November 26, 2009
- Running time: 113 minutes
- Country: South Korea
- Language: Korean

I Am Happy (Korean: 나는 행복합니다; RR: Naneun haengbokhamnida) is a 2009 South Korean drama film directed by Yoon Jong-chan, starring Hyun Bin and Lee Bo-young. It is a film adaptation of Yi Chong-jun's short novel Mr. Cho, Man-deuk, which tells a story about wounded souls and an encounter between a patient and a nurse who met in a mental institution. The film was released in theaters on November 26, 2009.

The film was selected to be screen at the 13th Busan International Film Festival in 2008. However, it was not released in theaters until late 2009.

== Plot ==
The deeply troubled Man-soo (Hyun Bin) becomes a patient at a psychiatric ward. He has a mother who has dementia and a brother who is addicted to gambling. These sad and angry memories about his family always tie Man-soo down and are the reasons why he has mental illness. Now institutionalized, Man-soo falls in love with Soo-kyung (Lee Bo-young), a nurse, who is also dealing with her own personal issues.

== Cast ==
- Hyun Bin as Man-soo
- Lee Bo-young as Soo-kyung
- Kim Sung-min as Hyung-cheol
- Son Young-soon as Man-soo's mom
- Jung Jae-jin as Soo-kyung's dad
- Choi Jong-ryul as village headman
- Lee Yoon-gun as Man-cheol
- Park Hyo-joo as Nurse Young-sook
- Park No-shik as Bong-cheol
- Kim Dae-ho as Song-sik
- Park Young-seo as Seung-bok
- Kang Hye-ryun as nurse
- Jung Min-sung as scoundrel
- Eun Joo-hee as Sang-mi
- Uhm Tae-goo as bar employee

== Production ==
The film was supported by the Jeonnam Film Commission and started shooting on March 27, 2008.
