= I Can Hear Your Voice =

South Korean television series

- Promotional poster
- Also known as: I Hear Your Voice
- Hangul: 너의 목소리가 들려
- RR: Neoui moksoriga deullyeo
- MR: Nŏŭi moksoriga tŭllyŏ
- Genre: Legal drama; Romance; Fantasy; Comedy
- Written by: Park Hye-ryun
- Directed by: Jo Soo-won
- Starring: Lee Bo-young; Lee Jong-suk; Yoon Sang-hyun; Lee Da-hee
- Opening theme: "Echo" by Every Single Day
- Country of origin: South Korea
- Original language: Korean
- No. of episodes: 18

Production
- Executive producers: Son Jung-hyun; Kim Uno; Son Ki-won
- Producers: Lee Seong-hoon; Shin Bong-cheol; Kim Jung-mi; Park Bo-gyeong
- Cinematography: Lee Jae-woo
- Editor: Ahn Cheol-hwan
- Running time: 60 minutes
- Production companies: Doremi Entertainment; Kim Jong-hak Production

Original release
- Network: SBS TV
- Release: June 5 – August 1, 2013

I Can Hear Your Voice (Korean: 너의 목소리가 들려) is a 2013 South Korean television series starring Lee Bo-young, Lee Jong-suk, Yoon Sang-hyun, and Lee Da-hee. It aired on SBS from June 5 to August 1, 2013, on Wednesdays and Thursdays at 21:55 for 18 episodes.

Originally set for 16 episodes, due to its successful ratings, the series was extended by 2 episodes.

== Synopsis ==
After overcoming a difficult childhood, Jang Hye-sung (Lee Bo-young) becomes a public defender, but she is pragmatic, self-preserving, and jaded. Her life changes when she encounters Park Soo-ha (Lee Jong-suk), a high school senior with the supernatural ability to read other people's thoughts by looking into their eyes. Soo-ha gained his mind-reading ability when witnessing his father's murder ten years previously. His father's death had initially been dismissed as a car accident until Hye-sung, then a high school girl (Kim So-hyun), gave a decisive testimony in court despite the killer's threats (Jung Woong-in). Soo-ha has been searching for her ever since. As Hye-sung works with Soo-ha and a cop-turned-lawyer Gwan-woo (Yoon Sang-hyun), she gradually lets go of her pursuit of money and glory. Together, the unlikely team uses unconventional methods to solve their cases.

== Cast ==
=== Main ===
- Lee Bo-young as Lawyer Jang Hye-sung
  - Kim So-hyun as 15-year-old Hye-sung

Smart and hardworking, Hye-sung was raised by a poor but loving mother. After being falsely accused of causing an incident involving fireworks, she gets expelled from high school. She bravely testifies on the witness stand, causing the murderer of Park Soo-ha's father to be convicted and imprisoned. But both experiences change her, and ten years later, Hye-sung is an apathetic public defender who doesn't care about her clients and only does her job for the salary.

- Lee Jong-suk as Park Soo-ha
  - Goo Seung-hyun as 9-year-old Soo-ha

After witnessing his father's death (and almost getting killed himself), 9 year old Soo-ha gains the supernatural ability to read people's minds by looking at their eyes. When high school teenager Hye-sung testified in court to corroborate his testimony regarding the killer, he swore that he would always protect and guard her. He nurses a crush on her for a decade, but when he meets her again, he's dismayed to find her completely different from what he has expected.

- Yoon Sang-hyun as Cha Gwan-woo

A cop who brings his idealism, empathy and attention to detail to his new job as a public defender. Though outwardly geeky and meek, he has a keen intelligence that sees new angles in his cases.

- Lee Da-hee as Seo Do-yeon
  - Jung Min-ah as 15-year-old Do-yeon

A prosecutor who comes from a rich, well-connected family, with her father being a judge and her mother a doctor. Do-yeon has always pushed herself to become the perfect daughter to please her parents. She had a rivalry with Hye-sung in high school and when a fireworks accident nearly caused her to lose her eyesight, she blames Hye-sung for it, despite the latter's denials. Do-yeon was also a witness to the murder of Park Soo-ha's father, but at the last minute, she lost her courage and didn't testify.

=== Supporting ===
- Jung Woong-in as Min Joon-gook, the murderer of Soo-ha's father, whom he had a grudge on. He was jailed for 10 years as a result of Hye-sung's testimony, which decisively led to him convicted of murder. After his release, he is bent on getting revenge on Hye-sung and Soo-ha for them getting him convicted of murder.
- Yoon Joo-sang as Lawyer Shin Sang-deok
- Choi Sung-joon as Choi Yoo-chang, clerk of the public defenders' office
- Kim Kwang-kyu as Judge Kim Gong-sook
- Kim Ga-eun as Go Sung-bin, Soo-ha's classmate
- Park Doo-shik as Kim Choong-ki, Soo-ha's classmate
- Kim Hae-sook as Eo Choon-shim, Hye-sung's mother
- Kim Byeong-ok as Hwang Dal-joong, Joon-gook's cellmate
- Jung Dong-hwan as Judge Seo Dae-seok, Do-yeon's father
- Lee Jung-hyuk as Lee Jung-hoon
- Jang Hee-soo as Do-yeon's mother
- Jo Deok-hyeon as Park Joo-hyeok, Soo-ha's father
- Kim Soo-yeon as Moon Dong-hee, Sung-bin's classmate who is an up-and-coming entertainer
- Jang Hee-woong as Prosecutor Jo, nicknamed "Mr. Grass-like Hair"
- Kim Hye-yoon as Kim Yun-jin (Ep. 1)

=== Special appearances ===
- So Yi-hyun as Joon-gook's lawyer (cameo, ep 1, 12)
- Kim Sung-kyun as detective (cameo, ep 1)
- Jeon Soo-kyeong as dental pad lady (cameo, ep 1)
- Lee Si-hoo as Student (cameo, ep 1)
- Han Ki-won as Jeong Pil-jae, the elder twin (guest appearance, ep 4–6)
- Han Ki-woong as Jeong Pil-seung, the younger twin (guest appearance, ep 4–6)
- Lee Byung-joon as head of free newspaper company (cameo, ep 7)
- Kim Hwan as newscaster (voice only, ep 8)
- Kim Gi-cheon as swindler disguised as a visually handicapped person (cameo, ep 9)
- Kim Hak-rae as spa customer (cameo, ep 10)
- Kim Mi-kyung as Jeon Young-ja/Seon Chae-ok, Dal-joong's wife (guest appearance, ep 12–14, 16)
- Ahn Moon-sook as head of the orphanage (cameo, ep 13)
- Kim Min-jong as Lawyer Choi Yoon (cameo, ep 14)
- Um Ki-joon as Lawyer Um Ki-joon (cameo, ep 14)
- Pyeon Sang-wook as newscaster (cameo, ep 15)
- Kim Mi-ryu as necklace shop clerk (cameo, ep 16)
- Ahn Young-mi as necklace shop customer (cameo, ep 16)
- Kangnam as pickpocket (cameo, ep 17)
- Jung Man-sik as police academy interviewer (cameo, ep 18)

== Original soundtrack ==
I Can Hear Your Voice OST

Soundtrack album by Various Artists
- Released: 2013
- Genre: Soundtrack
- Language: Korean
- Label: KT Music

=== Part 1 ===
Released on June 13, 2013
No.	Title	Lyrics	Music	Artist	Length
1.	"Echo" ((에코))	Moon Seong-nam	Moon Seong-nam, Jeong Jae-Woo	Every Single Day	03:04
2.	"Echo (Acoustic Ver.)"	Moon Seong-nam	Moon Seong-nam, Jeong Jae-Woo		03:20
3.	"Echo" (Inst.)		Moon Seong-nam, Jeong Jae-Woo		03:04
Total length:					10:50

=== Part 2 ===
Released on June 17, 2013
No.	Title	Lyrics	Music	Artist	Length
1.	"Why did you just come now?" ((왜 이제야 왔니?))	Jung Yeop, Eco Bridge	Jung Yeop, Eco Bridge	Jung Yeop	3:55
2.	"Why did you just come now?" (Inst.)		Jung Yeop, Eco Bridge		3:55
Total length:					7:50

=== Part 3 ===
Released on July 1, 2013
No.	Title	Lyrics	Music	Artist	Length
1.	"In My Eyes, In My Cheeks, In My Heart" ((두눈에 두볼에 가슴에))	Kim Beom-Ji	Kim Beom-Ji, Na Rae	Kim Yeon Ji	3:55
2.	"In My Eyes" (Inst.)		Kim Beom-Ji, Na Rae		3:55
Total length:					7:50

=== Part 4 ===
Released on July 13, 2013
No.	Title	Lyrics	Music	Artist	Length
1.	"Words you can't hear" ((너에겐들리지))	Yang Jae Seon	Yang Jae Seon, Shin Seung Hun	Shin Seung-Hun	3:42
2.	"Words you can't hear" (Inst.)		Yang Jae Seon, Shin Seung Hun		3:42
Total length:					7:28

=== Part 5 ===
Released on July 16, 2013
No.	Title	Lyrics	Music	Artist	Length
1.	"Sweety Lalala" ((달콤하게랄랄라))	Lee Boo Mi	Lee Boo Mi, Woo Ji-hoon	Melody Day	3:42
2.	"Sweety Lalala" (Inst.)		Lee Boo Mi, Woo Ji-hoon		3:23
Total length:					6:46

Disc 2:
No.	Title	Artist	Length
1.	"Breaking Moment"	Various Artists	3:13
2.	"Circus in Court Strings"	Various Artists	2:36
3.	"Don't Forget"	Various Artists	2:31
4.	"Echo Strings"	Various Artists	3:18
5.	"Echo Arp"	Various Artists	4:03
6.	"Return"	Various Artists	3:18
7.	"Sea and Stars"	Various Artists	3:23
8.	"Sun4"	Various Artists	2:28
9.	"Return"	Various Artists	3:18
10.	"Unhappy Misery"	Various Artists	4:21

== Ratings ==
Ep.	Broadcast date	Episode title (Note: Each of the episode titles is excerpted from the titles or lyrics of well-known songs.)	Average audience share			
Ep.	Broadcast date	Episode title	Nielsen Korea		TNmS	
Ep.	Broadcast date	Episode title	Nationwide	Seoul	Nationwide	Seoul
1	June 5, 2013	"I Hear Your Voice" (Note: Excerpted from the lyrics of "Chau Chau" (챠우챠우; Chauchau), performed by Delispice.)	7.7%	9.0%	7.8%	8.9%
2	June 6, 2013	"Bad Girl, Good Girl" (Note: Excerpted from the song of the same title, performed by Miss A.)	12.7%	14.0%	11.6%	13.6%
3	June 12, 2013	"I'll Be There" (Note: Excerpted from the song of the same title, performed by The Jackson 5.)	15.0%	16.5%	14.0%	16.5%
4	June 13, 2013	"Him in My Vague Memory" (Note: Excerpted from the song of the same title (흐린 기억 속의 그대; Heurin gieok sogui geudae), performed by Hyun Jin-young.)	16.1%	17.5%	17.3%	20.1%
5	June 19, 2013	"Words That Can't Be Trusted" (Note: Excerpted from the song of the same title (믿어선 안 될 말; Mideoseon an doel mal), performed by Nell.)	16.1%	17.7%	16.6%	19.3%
6	June 20, 2013	"Me, Abandoned All Alone at the Edge of the World" (Note: Excerpted from the lyrics of "You Are Another Me" (넌 또 다른 나; Neon tto dareun na), performed by Lee Seung-chul.)	17.8%	19.9%	16.6%	19.9%
7	June 26, 2013	"Why Is a Sad Premonition Never Wrong?" (Note: Excerpted from the lyrics of "Heart for Only One" (한 사람을 위한 마음; Han sarameul wihan maeum), performed by Lee Seung-hwan.)	16.1%	18.4%	15.1%	17.0%
8	June 27, 2013	"For Whom Are You Living?" (Note: Excerpted from the song of the same title (누구를 위한 삶인가?; Nugureul wihan salminga?), performed by Leessang featuring Hwang Jung-min and Ryoo Seung-bum.)	16.4%	18.1%	18.1%	20.7%
9	July 3, 2013	"If Even You Leave in Difficult Days" (Note: Excerpted from the lyrics of "My Love by My Side" (내 사랑 내 곁에; Nae sarang nae gyeote), performed by Kim Hyun-sik.)	17.9%	19.4%	17.3%	20.5%
10	July 4, 2013	"Why Am I Lost Searching for Painful Memories?" (Note: Excerpted from the lyrics of "Past Days" (지난 날; Jinan nal), performed by Yu Jae-ha.)	19.7%	20.9%	19.8%	23.2%
11	July 10, 2013	"I'm Sorry, I Hate You" (Note: Excerpted from the song of the same title (미안해, 널 미워해; Mianhae, neol miwohae), performed by Jaurim.)	22.1%	24.6%	22.2%	26.0%
12	July 11, 2013	"Etude of Memories" (Note: Excerpted from the song of the same title (기억의 습작; Gieogui seupjak), performed by Exhibition.)	22.8%	24.8%	22.2%	25.8%
13	July 17, 2013	"The One Word in My Heart That I Can't Keep Inside" (Note: Excerpted from the lyrics of "I Love You" (사랑합니다; Saranghamnida), performed by Tim.)	21.6%	23.7%	22.6%	25.7%
14	July 18, 2013	"Things That I Have to Be Silent in My Memory" (Note: Excerpted from the lyrics of "The Days" (그날들; Geunaldeul), performed by Kim Kwang-seok.)	23.1%	26.2%	23.6%	27.9%
15	July 24, 2013	"I Don't Ruin Anything" (Note: Excerpted from the lyrics of "Left-Handed" (왼손잡이; Oensonjabi), performed by Panic.)	23.0%	24.8%	24.2%	27.4%
16	July 25, 2013	"The Thieving Magpie Overture" (Note: Excerpted from the overture to The Thieving Magpie (도둑까치 서곡; Dodukkkachi seogok), written by Gioachino Rossini.)	24.1%	26.7%	25.2%	28.1%
17	July 31, 2013	"Without Your Eyes, I Can't Even See in Front of Myself" (Note: Excerpted from the lyrics of "Without You", performed by 1TYM.)	22.3%	24.7%	23.7%	25.8%
18	August 1, 2013	"Through the Light in the Darkness, You Remain with Me" (Note: Excerpted from the lyrics of "White Night" (백야; Baegya), performed by Zitten.)	23.1%	24.8%	26.2%	29.0%
Average			19.1%	22.0%	18.8%	20.7%
In the table above, the blue numbers represent the lowest ratings and the red numbers represent the highest ratings.

== Awards and nominations ==
Award	Category	Recipient	Result
6th Korea Drama Awards	Grand Prize (Daesang)	Lee Bo-young	Won
6th Korea Drama Awards	Best Drama	I Can Hear Your Voice	Nominated
6th Korea Drama Awards	Best Production Director	Jo Soo-won	Won
6th Korea Drama Awards	Top Excellence Award, Actor	Jung Woong-in	Won
6th Korea Drama Awards	Excellence Award, Actor	Lee Jong-suk	Won
6th Korea Drama Awards	Excellence Award, Actress	Lee Da-hee	Nominated
6th Korea Drama Awards	Best Writer	Park Hye-ryun	Nominated
6th Korea Drama Awards	Best New Actress	Kim Ga-eun	Nominated
6th Korea Drama Awards	Best Couple Award	Lee Jong-suk and Lee Bo-young	Won
APAN Star Awards	Top Excellence Award, Actress	Lee Bo-young	Won
APAN Star Awards	Excellence Award, Actor	Lee Jong-suk	Won
APAN Star Awards	Acting Award, Actor	Jung Woong-in	Won
APAN Star Awards	Best Couple Award	Lee Jong-suk and Lee Bo-young	Won
Mnet Asian Music Awards	Best OST	"Why Did You Just Come Now?" – Jung Yeop	Nominated
Korean Culture and Entertainment Awards	Top Excellence Award, Actor in Drama	Lee Jong-suk	Won
Korean Culture and Entertainment Awards	Hallyu Grand Award	Lee Jong-suk	Won
26th Grimae Awards	Best Actress	Lee Bo-young	Won
SBS Drama Awards	Grand Prize (Daesang)	Lee Bo-young	Won
SBS Drama Awards	Top Excellence Award, Actress in a Miniseries	Lee Bo-young	Nominated
SBS Drama Awards	Excellence Award, Actress in a Miniseries	Lee Da-hee	Nominated
SBS Drama Awards	Excellence Award, Actor in a Miniseries	Lee Jong-suk	Won
SBS Drama Awards	Excellence Award, Actor in a Miniseries	Yoon Sang-hyun	Nominated
SBS Drama Awards	Special Award, Actress in a Miniseries	Kim Hae-sook	Nominated
SBS Drama Awards	Special Award, Actor in a Miniseries	Jung Woong-in	Won
SBS Drama Awards	Special Award, Actor in a Miniseries	Kim Kwang-kyu	Nominated
SBS Drama Awards	Actor/Actress of the Year (selected by directors)	Lee Bo-young	Won
SBS Drama Awards	Top 10 Stars	Lee Bo-young	Won
SBS Drama Awards	Top 10 Stars	Lee Jong-suk	Won
SBS Drama Awards	New Star Award	Lee Da-hee	Won
50th Baeksang Arts Awards	Best Drama	I Can Hear Your Voice	Nominated
50th Baeksang Arts Awards	Best Director	Jo Soo-won	Nominated
50th Baeksang Arts Awards	Best Actor	Lee Jong-suk	Nominated
50th Baeksang Arts Awards	Best Actress	Lee Bo-young	Won
