= Won Tae-yeon =

South Korean film director, screenwriter and poet

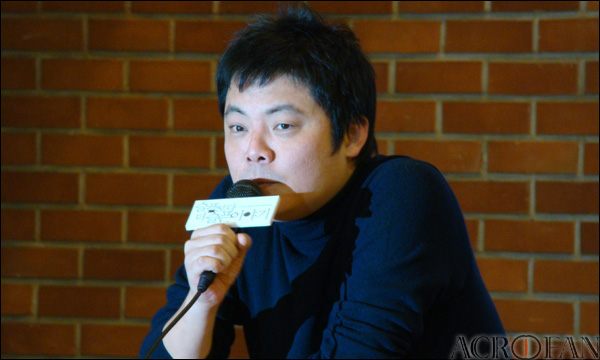
- Born: 21 May 1971 (age 55); Seoul, South Korea
- Occupations: director, screenwriter, poet, lyricist
- Years active: 1992–present
- Employer: LOEN Entertainment

Korean name
- Hangul: 원태연
- Hanja: 元泰橪
- RR: Won Taeyeon
- MR: Wŏn T'aeyŏn

Won Tae-yeon (Korean: 원태연; born 21 May 1971) is a South Korean film director, screenwriter and poet. He is currently working for LOEN Entertainment, a South Korean record label and talent agency.

== Filmography ==
Year	English title	Korean title	Role(s)
1997	Rocket Has Launched!	로켓트는 발사됐다	Actor
2000	Il Mare	시월애	Screenwriter
2006	Love Me Not	사랑따윈 필요없어	Narrator
2009	More than Blue	슬픔보다 더 슬픈 이야기	Director, screenwriter
2014	Another Parting	어떤 안녕	Director, screenwriter

== Works ==
- 넌 가끔가다 내 생각을 하지 난 가끔가다 딴 생각을 해 (1992)
- 손 끝으로 원을 그려봐 네가 그릴 수 있는 한 크게 그걸 뺀만큼 널 사랑해 (1993)
- 원태연 알레르기 (1994)
- 사랑해요 당신이 나를 생각하지 않는 시간에도 (1996)
- 사용설명서 (1998)
- Burying The Face in Tears (눈물에 얼굴을 묻는다) (2000)
- 그녀와 나 사이엔 무엇이 있을까 (2000)
- 안녕 (2003)
- 너에게 전화가 왔다 (2022)

== See also ==
- List of Korean film directors
- List of Korean-language poets
- Cinema of Korea
