= Im Jung-eun =

South Korean actress

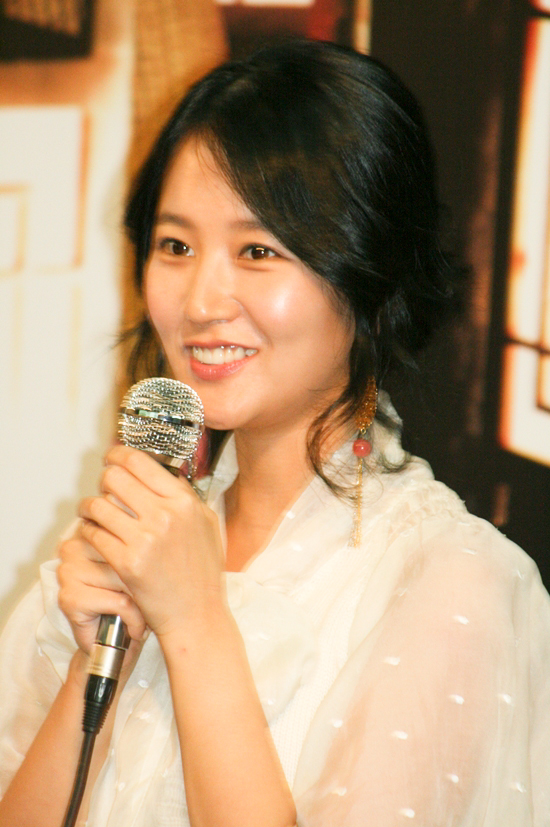
- Born: Busan, South Korea
- Other name: Lim Jeong-eun
- Education: Kyung Hee University - Theater and Film
- Occupation: Actress
- Years active: 2002–present
- Agent: Management Koo

Korean name
- Hangul: 임정은
- RR: Im Jeongeun
- MR: Im Chŏngŭn

Im Jung-eun (Korean: 임정은) is a South Korean actress. She is best known for her roles in Joseon X-Files (also known as Secret Investigation Record) and Man from the Equator.

== Filmography ==
=== Television series ===
Year	Title	Role	Network	Notes	Ref.
2005	Lawyers	Kim Se Hee	MBC		
2006	Cloud Stairs	Oh Yoon-hee	KBS2		
2007	Ground Zero		MBC		
2008	Aquarius		SBS		
2008	The Kingdom of the Winds	Princess Seryu	KBS2		
2009	Swallow the Sun	Ahn Mi-yeon	SBS		
2010	Joseon X-Files	Heo Yoon-yi	tvN		
2011	When Women Powder Twice	Suzy Hamilton	JTBC		
2012	Man from the Equator	Choi Soo-mi	KBS2		
2012	KBS Drama Special: "Glass Prison"	Soo-jeong	KBS2	Season 3 Episode 10	
2013	Ruby Ring	Jung Runa/Jung Ruby	KBS2		
2019	Babel	Na Yeong-eun	TV Chosun		
2020	Once Again	Sung Hyun-kyung	KBS		

=== Films ===
- Rainbow Goddess (2020)
- My Little Brother (2016)
- Tone-deaf Clinic aka Love Clinique (2012)
- My Love (2007)
- Shadows in the Palace (2007)
- Tazza: The High Rollers (2006)
- Cinderella (2006)
- Fly High (2006)
- Same Pillow, Different Dream (2005)
- Make It Big (2002)

=== Variety shows ===
- Fun TV Rollercoaster "Hongdae 정태" (tvN, 2011)
- Sunday Sunday Night: Hot Brothers (MBC, 2010)
- Sunday Sunday Night (MBC, 2009)
- Ya Shim Man Man: Entertainment Village (SBS, 2009)

=== Music video appearances ===
- "Be With You" (The SeeYa, 2012)

== Awards ==
- 2012 Korean Culture and Entertainment Awards: Best Supporting Actress (Tone-deaf Clinic)
- 2008 SBS Drama Awards: New Star Award (Aquarius)
