= Golden House (TV series) =

South Korean television series

- Promotional poster
- Also known as: Good Harvest Villa
- Hangul: 위기일발 풍년빌라
- Lit.: Harvest Villa
- RR: Wigiilbal pungnyeonbilla
- MR: Wigiilbal p'ungnyŏnbilla
- Genre: Comedy, Thriller
- Written by: Jang Hang-jun; Kim Eun-hee
- Directed by: Jo Hyun-tak
- Starring: Shin Ha-kyun; Lee Bo-young; Baek Yoon-sik
- Country of origin: South Korea
- Original language: Korean
- No. of episodes: 20

Production
- Production company: JS Pictures

Original release
- Network: tvN
- Release: March 5 – May 27, 2010

Golden House (Korean: 위기일발 풍년빌라; RR: Wigiilbal pungnyeonbilla; lit. 'Harvest Villa') is a 2010 South Korean television series starring Shin Ha-kyun, Lee Bo-young, and Baek Yoon-sik. It aired on cable channel tvN from March 5 to May 27, 2010 on Fridays at 23:00 for 20 episodes.

== Plot ==
When the owner of a shabby, soon-to-be-demolished villa in a run-down part of Seoul mysteriously dies, it sets in motion a chain of events that touches many lives. His son Oh Bok-gyu (Shin Ha-kyun), a struggling actor who was previously completely unaware of his inheritance, arrives to take possession of Apartment Number 201, only to find that rumors are swirling everywhere that his father has left a huge fortune of ₩50 billion in gold bars hidden somewhere in the villa — and that his father was murdered. As Bok-gyu navigates his way through the web of mystery surrounding his father's death, he encounters intrusive neighbors, oddball residents, a hardcore gangster and a beautiful girl — any of whom may have their eyes set on his money. When he meets orphaned, lovely Yoon Seo-rin (Lee Bo-young), he thinks that she's the girl of his dreams, but is unsure whether to trust her.

== Cast ==
- Shin Ha-kyun as Oh Bok-gyu
- Lee Bo-young as Yoon Seo-rin
- Baek Yoon-sik as Park Tae-chon
- Kim Chang-wan as Kim Sang-chul
- Jo Mi-ryung as Madam Hong
- Go Soo-hee as Kim Choo-ja
- Moon Hee-kyung as Noh Mae-ja
- Kang Byul as Park Song-yi
- Jung Kyung-ho as Sang-geun
- Park Hyo-jun as Ha-geun
- Choi Joo-bong as Kim Pil-choong
- Park Hye-jin as Lee Soon-yi
- Kwon Byung-gil as Choi Sung-shik
- Jeon Se-hong as Yoo-ra
- Jung Tae-won as Hang-joon
- Lee Joo-shil
- Lee Hee-jung
- Yoon Byung-hee
- Kim Dong-hyeon
- Lee Seung-joon

== Awards ==
Director Jo Hyun-tak won the New Media Award at the 3rd Korea Drama Awards in 2010.
