= My Brother (2004 film) =

- Theatrical poster
- Hangul: 우리형
- Hanja: 우리兄
- RR: Urihyeong
- MR: Urihyŏng
- Directed by: Ahn Gwon-tae
- Written by: Ahn Gwon-tae
- Produced by: Yang Jung-gyeong; Park Sung-keun; Lee Seong-chan
- Starring: Shin Ha-kyun; Won Bin
- Cinematography: Hwang Ki-seok
- Edited by: Kyung Min-ho
- Music by: Kim Hyeong-seok
- Distributed by: CJ Entertainment
- Release date: 8 October 2004
- Running time: 112 minutes
- Country: South Korea
- Language: Korean

My Brother (Korean: 우리형) is a 2004 South Korean buddy drama film written and directed by Ahn Gwon-tae.

== Plot ==
Kim Jong-hyeon, a tough high school student who excels at fighting, has trouble getting along with his older brother Seong-hyeon, a studious type with a cleft palate. They were born within a year of each other, and attend the same classes at the same school, though Jong-hyeon largely ignores Seong-hyeon. Jong-hyeon also harbors some resentment towards his single mother, who seems to prefer the elder son. The conflict between them increase when both brothers fall for the same girl.

== Cast ==
- Won Bin as Kim Jong-hyeon
- Shin Ha-kyun as Kim Seong-hyeon
- Kim Hae-sook as their mother
- Lee Bo-young as Jo Mi-ryeong
- Jung Ho-bin as Young-chun
- Kim Tae-wook as Tight pants
- Cho Jin-woong as Du-sik
- Kim Jong-man as Danchugu

== Reception ==
The film was released in South Korea on 8 October 2004 and topped the box office for two weeks. It was the sixth best-selling South Korean film of 2004 with 2,479,585 admissions.

== Awards and nominations ==
Year	Awards	Category	Recipient	Results
2004	25th Blue Dragon Film Awards	Best Supporting Actress	Kim Hae-sook	Nominated
2004	3rd Korean Film Awards	Best Actor	Won Bin	Nominated
2004	3rd Korean Film Awards	Best Actress	Kim Hae-sook	Nominated
