= Cruel Winter Blues =

- Poster for Cruel Winter Blues (2006)
- Hangul: 열혈남아
- Hanja: 熱血男兒
- RR: Yeolhyeollama
- MR: Yŏrhyŏllama
- Directed by: Lee Jeong-beom
- Written by: Lee Jeong-beom
- Produced by: Cha Seung-jae; Kim Mi-hee
- Starring: Sul Kyung-gu; Jo Han-sun; Na Moon-hee
- Cinematography: Kim Dong-cheon
- Edited by: Shin Min-kyung
- Music by: Kim Jun-seok
- Distributed by: CJ Entertainment
- Release date: 9 November 2006
- Running time: 118 minutes
- Country: South Korea
- Language: Korean
- Budget: US$4 million
- Box office: US$2.5 million

Cruel Winter Blues (Korean: 열혈남아; RR: Yeolhyeollama; lit. 'A Hot-Blooded Man') is a 2006 South Korean neo-noir crime drama film written and directed by Lee Jeong-beom. It stars Sul Kyung-gu, Jo Han-sun and Na Moon-hee in the lead roles. The narrative centers around a small-time crook who partners with a retired taekwondo practitioner to seek revenge on the man who killed his mentor, and ends up befriending the killer's mother who reminds him of his hometown.

The film was released on 9 November 2006.

== Synopsis ==
A mob captain, Jae-mun (Sul Kyung-gu) is the seasoned veteran of a mob family. He decides to go after rival mobster Dae-sik, the man who killed his boss and childhood friend a few years earlier. He takes Chi-guk with him as his partner in the assassination. Although a physically imposing black belt in taekwondo, Chi-guk (Jo Han-sun) is a soft-spoken newcomer to gang life, who is quietly offended by Jae-mun's arbitrary and random acts of cruelty and rudeness against him and others. Together, they travel to Dae-sik's hometown, a remote rural village called Bulgyo in South Jeolla Province.

While waiting for an opportunity to perform the hit, Jae-mun coincidentally befriends Dae-sik's mother Jeon-sim (Na Moon-hee) and spends some time with her. She comes to lovingly treat him as another son, and Jae-mun begins to feel conflicted. A tragic plot develops, culminating in a bloody showdown between Jae-mun and Dae-sik.

== Cast ==
- Jo Han-sun as Chi-guk
- Sul Kyung-gu as Jae-mun
- Na Moon-hee as Jeong-sim
- Kim Kwak-kyung-hee as Flat woman

== Awards and nominations ==
2006 Women in Film Korea Awards

- Best Actress - Na Moon-hee

2007 Baeksang Arts Awards

- Nomination - Best Actress - Na Moon-hee
- Nomination - Best New Director - Lee Jeong-beom

2007 Chunsa Film Art Awards

- Best Supporting Actor - Jo Han-sun

2007 Blue Dragon Film Awards

- Best Supporting Actress - Na Moon-hee
- Nomination - Best Supporting Actor - Jo Han-sun
- Nomination - Best New Director - Lee Jeong-beom

2007 Korean Film Awards

- Nomination - Best Actor - Sul Kyung-gu
- Nomination - Best Supporting Actor - Jo Han-sun
- Nomination - Best New Director - Lee Jeong-beom
