= Man from the Equator =

South Korean television series

- Promotional poster
- Also known as: The Equator Man
- Hangul: 적도의 남자
- Hanja: 赤道의 男子
- RR: Jeokdoui namja
- MR: Chŏktoŭi namja
- Genre: Revenge; Melodrama
- Created by: KBS Drama
- Written by: Kim In-young
- Directed by: Kim Yong-soo; Han Sang-woo
- Starring: Uhm Tae-woong; Lee Joon-hyuk; Lee Bo-young; Im Jung-eun
- Music by: Park Seung-jin
- Country of origin: South Korea
- Original language: Korean
- No. of episodes: 20

Production
- Executive producer: Jung Hae-ryong (KBS Drama)
- Producers: Kang Byung-taek; Moon Jung Soo; Kim Hee Yul
- Production locations: South Korea; Phuket, Thailand
- Running time: 60 minutes
- Production company: Pan Entertainment

Original release
- Network: KBS2
- Release: March 21 – May 24, 2012

Man from the Equator (Korean: 적도의 남자; RR: Jeokdoui namja; also known as The Equator Man) is a 2012 South Korean television series, starring Uhm Tae-woong, Lee Joon-hyuk, Lee Bo-young and Im Jung-eun. A tense, emotionally charged tale of brotherhood and betrayal, it follows two best friends with a tragic, twisted history that follows them from youth to adulthood. It aired on KBS2 from March 21 to May 24, 2012 on Wednesdays and Thursdays at 21:55 (KST) for 20 episodes.

After premiering in last place among its more high-profile competitors The King 2 Hearts and Rooftop Prince, the viewership ratings for Man from the Equator steadily climbed due in large part to Uhm Tae-woong's praise-worthy acting and the well-combined plot of romance, fate, revenge and success. Out of a total of 20 episodes, 16 rated number one in its timeslot.

== Plot ==
One the driven top student and the other a happy-go-lucky troublemaker, Jang-il (Siwan) and Sun-woo (Lee Hyun-woo) become unlikely buddies in high school, both poor but proud in their own ways. Their fathers both have ties to a powerful businessman who orders Jang-il's father to kill Sun-woo's father. One desperate crime begets another, and the boys' friendship derails in a shocking betrayal. The attack leaves Sun-woo blind and in a coma. Thirteen years later, their fates will come to a head when they meet again as adults. Jang-il (Lee Joon-hyuk) has become a prosecutor haunted by his past, while Sun-woo (Uhm Tae-woong), the young CEO of investment trust company Royal Tree, is plotting his revenge. Their fates are intertwined with the women they love—Ji-won (Lee Bo-young), a volunteer reader for visually impaired people who now works as a VIP party planner at a five-star hotel, and Soo-mi (Im Jung-eun), a hyper-realism painter. As Jang-il and Sun-woo vow to destroy each other, the truth unravels in a harrowing cycle of deception and revenge as the crimes and secrets of yesteryear come to light.

== Cast ==
- Uhm Tae-woong as Kim Sun-woo
  - Lee Hyun-woo as teenage Sun-woo

Formerly a problem child with a penchant for getting into fist fights, Sun-woo discovers his new-found passion for learning after he befriends top student Jang-il. One day, Kyung-pil, whom he looked up to as a father, dies mysteriously. While trying to discover the truth behind his death, Sun-woo gets into a fatal accident. Years later, he establishes himself as a successful businessman. His new goal now is to solve the mystery behind Kyung-pil's death while coming face to face with his former childhood best friend and nemesis, Jang-il.

- Lee Joon-hyuk as Lee Jang-il
  - Yim Si-wan as teenage Jang-il

Jang-il is from a poor family and grew up in the countryside. From a young age, he excelled in his academic studies, dreaming of one day making it in the real world. His efforts pay off and he becomes a celebrated public prosecutor. Jang-il's greed and ambition for fame and fortune makes him betray his childhood best friend Sun-woo, and he must now live with his dark and lonely secret.

- Lee Bo-young as Han Ji-won
  - Kyung Soo-jin as young Ji-won
- Im Jung-eun as Choi Soo-mi
  - Park Se-young as young Soo-mi
- Kim Yeong-cheol as Jin No-shik

Sun-woo's biological father

- Lee Won-jong as Lee Yong-bae
- Lee Jae-yong as Choi Kwang-chun
- Lee Dae-yeon as Kim Kyung-pil

Sun-woo's adoptive father, a timid but kind man.

- Cha Hwa-yeon as Ma Hee-jung
- Lee Seung-hyung as Department head Cha
- Jeong Ho-bin as Moon Tae-joo
- Kim Soo-hyun as Mr. Koon
- Kang Ji-sub as Prosecutor Choi Yoon-suk
- Kim Hye-eun as Park Yoon-joo
- Park Hyo-jun as Geumjool
- Lee Chan-ho as teenage Geumjool

== Ratings ==
In the table below, the blue numbers represent the lowest ratings and the red numbers represent the highest ratings.

Episode #	Original broadcast date	Average audience share			
Episode #	Original broadcast date	TNmS Ratings		AGB Nielsen	
Episode #	Original broadcast date	Nationwide	Seoul National Capital Area	Nationwide	Seoul National Capital Area
1	21 March 2012	7.9%	8.7%	7.7%	8.0%
2	22 March 2012	8.1%	9.1%	8.1%	8.2%
3	28 March 2012	8.7%	9.0%	8.1%	8.2%
4	29 March 2012	8.9%	9.5%	8.5%	8.9%
5	4 April 2012	11.4%	12.6%	10.2%	10.7%
6	5 April 2012	9.6%	11.1%	10.2%	10.5%
7	11 April 2012	13.1%	15.8%	14.3%	15.4%
8	12 April 2012	11.7%	13.4%	10.8%	11.2%
9	18 April 2012	12.1%	13.4%	12.0%	12.6%
10	19 April 2012	13.3%	14.7%	13.1%	13.9%
11	25 April 2012	15.6%	16.7%	15.0%	15.7%
12	26 April 2012	13.6%	15.7%	15.2%	16.1%
13	2 May 2012	13.4%	15.0%	14.7%	15.3%
14	3 May 2012	13.1%	14.6%	13.9%	14.9%
15	9 May 2012	12.5%	15.5%	14.6%	16.0%
16	10 May 2012	12.9%	14.5%	14.2%	15.5%
17	16 May 2012	13.5%	15.4%	15.1%	15.3%
18	17 May 2012	13.6%	16.4%	14.2%	14.9%
19	23 May 2012	12.8%	14.8%	14.3%	15.5%
20	24 May 2012	13.8%	16.3%	14.1%	15.1%
Average		12.0%	13.6%	12.4%%	13.1%

== Awards and nominations ==
Year	Award	Category	Recipient	Result
2012	5th Korea Drama Awards	Grand Prize (Daesang)	Uhm Tae-woong	Nominated
2012	5th Korea Drama Awards	Excellence Award, Actress	Kim Hye-eun	Nominated
2012	1st K-Drama Star Awards	Excellence Award, Actor	Uhm Tae-woong	Nominated
2012	KBS Drama Awards	Top Excellence Award, Actor	Uhm Tae-woong	Nominated
2012	KBS Drama Awards	Top Excellence Award, Actress	Lee Bo-young	Nominated
2012	KBS Drama Awards	Excellence Award, Actor in a Mid-length Drama	Uhm Tae-woong	Won
2012	KBS Drama Awards	Excellence Award, Actor in a Mid-length Drama	Lee Joon-hyuk	Nominated
2012	KBS Drama Awards	Excellence Award, Actress in a Mid-length Drama	Lee Bo-young	Won
2012	KBS Drama Awards	Actor of the Year (awarded by PDs from all three broadcasters)	Uhm Tae-woong	Won
2012	KBS Drama Awards	Best New Actor	Lee Hyun-woo	Nominated
2012	KBS Drama Awards	Best New Actress	Park Se-young	Nominated
2012	KBS Drama Awards	Best Supporting Actor	Lee Jae-yong	Nominated
2012	KBS Drama Awards	Best Supporting Actress	Cha Hwa-yeon	Nominated
2013	49th Baeksang Arts Awards	Best TV Actor	Uhm Tae-woong	Nominated
