= Won Bin =

South Korean actor (born 1977)

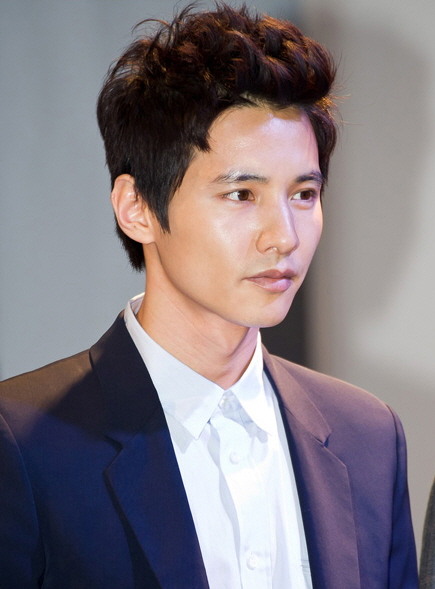
- Won in January 2011
- Born: Kim Do-jin; November 10, 1977 (age 49); Jeongseon County, Gangwon Province, South Korea
- Education: Paekche Institute of the Arts; Yong In University
- Occupation: Actor
- Years active: 1997–2010
- Agent: Eden 9
- Spouse: Lee Na-young (m. 2015)
- Children: 1

Korean name
- Hangul: 김도진
- RR: Gim Dojin
- MR: Kim Tojin

Stage name
- Hangul: 원빈
- RR: Won Bin
- MR: Wŏn Pin

Signature
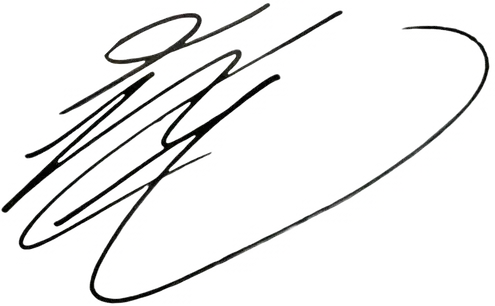

Kim Do-jin (Korean: 김도진; born November 10, 1977), known professionally as Won Bin (원빈), is a South Korean actor. He first gained wide popularity in 2000 after starring in the television series Autumn in My Heart. One of the most selective actors in the Korean entertainment industry, he has starred in only five films to date: Guns & Talks (2001), Taegukgi (2004), My Brother (2004), Mother (2009), and The Man from Nowhere (2010). He was Gallup Korea's Film Actor of the Year in 2010 and 2011.

== Early life ==
Won was born on November 10, 1977, in Jeongseon County, (Note: In 2019, the mayor of Jeongseon announced the development of a tourist course named after Won to boost the local economy.) Gangwon Province, South Korea. He is the fifth and youngest child, with one brother and three sisters. His father was employed in a mine, and his mother worked on a farm. Like other children living in mountainous areas, Won spent most of his time playing with friends in the mountains and rivers. He was often shy, introspective, and quiet—traits that would follow him into adulthood. Although not talkative or outgoing, he excelled in sports. Won began taking taekwondo lessons and holds a black belt. He graduated from Chuncheon Mech Tech High School and initially planned to become a car mechanic due to his interest in car racing and motorcycling.

In November 1995, a cable television network was looking for new actors; Won applied and was accepted in his last semester of high school. He played bit parts on cable television, where he was noticed by fashion designer André Kim, who invited him to appear in his fashion show. Afterward, Won signed with a talent agency and decided to adopt the stage name "Won Bin".

== Career ==
Won's official acting debut is considered to be the 1997 television series Propose, in which he played a supporting role. He then starred in the series Ready Go! (1998) and Kwangki (1999). In 1998, Won graduated from the Broadcasting and Entertainment Department at Paekche Institute of the Arts.

Won had his big breakthrough in 2000. He played the rebellious youngest son in the critically acclaimed drama Tough Guy's Love (Kkokji). However, it was Autumn in My Heart that brought him widespread recognition not only in Korea but throughout Asia. The series became widely popular outside of Korea, ushering in the cultural phenomenon known as the "Korean Wave". Vogue Korea called Won "the original flower boy" and "the original Hallyu star".

In 2001, Won graduated from the Department of Theater at Yong In University. In 2002, he appeared in the series Friends, the first South Korean–Japanese co-production. That same year, he enrolled in the master's program at the Department of Film, the Graduate School of Arts, Yong In University.

Won's first major success on the big screen was the war drama Taegukgi, in which he played a sensitive younger brother who was forcibly drafted into the South Korean army at the start of the Korean War. Taegukgi became the highest-grossing film in South Korea in 2004, selling 11.75 million tickets. Won also starred in such popular films as Guns & Talks (2001) and My Brother (2004).

In November 2005, Won enlisted for mandatory military service. He was stationed in the Korean Demilitarized Zone, a position for which he volunteered. On June 2, 2006, the military officially confirmed that Won would no longer be active. The decision was made by the military when Won sustained injury to his ACL. He underwent surgery and was officially discharged on June 7, 2006. Rehabilitation from the injury took more than a year.

In September 2007, Won was appointed as a special representative of the Korean Committee for UNICEF. Over the years, he has participated in various programs and charity events for the organization. In June 2024, he was appointed UNICEF Goodwill Ambassador in Korea.

After a five-year break, Won returned to the big screen with the film Mother, directed by Bong Joon Ho. The film premiered in the Un Certain Regard section at the 2009 Cannes Film Festival. This was followed by The Man from Nowhere, which became the highest-grossing film in South Korea in 2010 and is Won's final appearance as an actor to date.

Despite his prolonged hiatus from acting, Won retains his popularity with the public. In 2024, Gallup Korea conducted a survey on "The actor you want to see again", in which Won took first place.

== Personal life ==
On May 30, 2015, Won married actress Lee Na-young in a small, private ceremony in a wheat field in Won's hometown of Jeongseon County. (Note: The wheat field where the wedding took place became a tourist attraction.) The couple reportedly began dating in August 2012. Lee gave birth to their son in December 2015.

Won has investments in real estate. He also does some farming, growing chokeberries and making chokeberry juice and sesame oil.

== Endorsements ==
Won is a successful commercial model. In 2018, a news program claimed that Won had earned more than ₩24 billion from advertising since 2010. He has modeled for more than 50 brands since the late 1990s.

Won also worked as a fashion model for André Kim, appearing in several of his fashion shows in the 1990s and early 2000s. Kim wrote in his book, "I happened to see Won Bin by chance. His exquisite sculptural features, the overall balance of his face, his lonely gaze, and his elegant aura. Very young yet somehow profound. His inner depth was radiating beautifully."

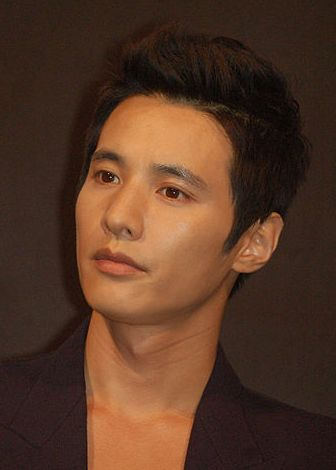
Won in 2010

== Public image ==
Won is one of the most elusive actors in South Korea. Due to the rarity of meeting him in person, other celebrities refer to him as a "legendary dragon". His long hiatus from acting adds to his mystique.

Won is considered one of the best examples of a good-looking man in South Korea; he has been nicknamed "Godbin" and "CG" by Korean internet users. The director of Mother, Bong Joon Ho, said that he added the line, "Do-joon's eyes are like a work of art. They're like deer's eyes," after casting Won for the role.

Won is often referenced in popular culture, from songs to dramas. The first Korean cyber singer, Adam, who debuted in 1998, was modeled after him. Screenwriter Kim Eun-sook, who has often said she would like to work with Won, named the main character of the 2012 series A Gentleman's Dignity Kim Do-jin, which is Won's real name. The hair-cutting scene from The Man from Nowhere has spawned numerous parodies.

== Filmography ==
=== Film ===
Year	Title	Role	Notes	Ref.
1998	Saturday, 2:00 pm	Delivery man	Special appearance	
2001	Guns & Talks	Ha-yun		
2004	Taegukgi	Lee Jin-seok		
2004	My Brother	Jong-hyun		
2009	Mother	Yoon Do-joon		
2010	The Man from Nowhere	Cha Tae-sik		

=== Television series ===
Year	Title	Role	Notes	Ref.
1997	Propose	Hyun-woo		
1997–1998	Ready, Go!	Han Seung-joo		
1999	Jump	Won Bin	Special appearance	
1999–2000	Kwangki	Kang Min		
2000	Drama City – "Small Station"	Min-ho		
2000	Kkokji	Song Myung-tae		
2000	Autumn in My Heart	Han Tae-suk		
2002	Friends	Kim Ji-hoon	South Korea–Japan co-production	

=== Music video appearances ===
Year	Song title	Artist	Ref.
1999	"Goodbye Day"	Han Sung-ho	
2001	"For You"	Yim Jae-beom	

== Accolades ==
=== Awards and nominations ===
Name of the award ceremony, year presented, category, nominee of the award, and the result of the nomination
Award ceremony	Year	Category	Nominee / Work	Result	Ref.
Asian Film Awards	2010	Best Supporting Actor	Mother	Nominated	
Baeksang Arts Awards	2001	Best New Actor – Television	Autumn in My Heart	Won	
Baeksang Arts Awards	2010	Best Actor – Film	Mother	Nominated	
Baeksang Arts Awards	2011	Best Actor – Film	The Man from Nowhere	Nominated	
Blue Dragon Film Awards	2001	Best New Actor	Guns & Talks	Nominated	
Blue Dragon Film Awards	2010	Best Actor	The Man from Nowhere	Nominated	
Blue Dragon Film Awards	2010	Popular Star Award	Won Bin	Won	
Buil Film Awards	2010	Best Actor	The Man from Nowhere	Nominated	
Bvlgari Brilliant Dreams Award	2002	—N/a	Won Bin	Won	
Chunsa Film Art Awards	2004	Best New Actor	Taegukgi	Won	
Cine21 Film Awards	2010	Actor of the Year	The Man from Nowhere	Won	
Golden Cinematography Awards	2004	Best New Actor	Taegukgi	Won	
Grand Bell Awards	2010	Best Actor	The Man from Nowhere	Won	
Grand Bell Awards	2010	Popularity Award	Won Bin	Won	
Grand Bell Awards	2011	Popularity Award	Won Bin	Won	
Japan Best Jewellery Wearer Award	2011	Special Award	Won Bin	Won	
KBS Drama Awards	1999	Best New Actor	Kwangki	Won	
KBS Drama Awards	2000	Excellence in Acting Award	Autumn in My Heart	Won	
KOFRA Film Awards	2011	Best Actor	The Man from Nowhere	Won	
Korea Best Dresser Swan Awards	2000	Best Dressed (Actor)	Won Bin	Won	
Korea International Youth Film Festival	2010	Favorite Actor	Won Bin	Won	
Korea International Youth Film Festival	2011	Favorite Actor	Won Bin	Won	
Korean Film Awards	2002	Best New Actor	Guns & Talks	Nominated	
Korean Film Awards	2004	Best Actor	My Brother	Nominated	
Korean Film Awards	2010	Best Actor	The Man from Nowhere	Won	
Max Movie Awards	2011	Best Actor	The Man from Nowhere	Won	
University Film Festival of Korea	2010	Best Actor	The Man from Nowhere	Won	

=== Listicles ===
Name of publisher, year listed, name of listicle, and placement
Publisher	Year	Listicle	Placement	Ref.
Forbes	2011	Korea Power Celebrity 40	17th	
Forbes	2012	Korea Power Celebrity 40	37th	
Gallup Korea	2010	Film Actor of the Year	1st	
Gallup Korea	2011	Film Actor of the Year	1st	
The Screen	2009	1984–2008 Top Box Office Powerhouse Actors in Korean Movies	37th	
