= More than Blue =

2009 South Korean film

More Than Blue
- Theatrical release poster
- Hangul: 슬픔보다 더 슬픈 이야기
- RR: Seulpeumboda deo seulpeun iyagi
- MR: Sŭlp'ŭmboda tŏ sŭlp'ŭn iyagi
- Directed by: Won Tae-yeon
- Written by: Won Tae-yeon
- Produced by: Kim Jho Kwang-soo
- Starring: Kwon Sang-woo; Lee Bo-young; Lee Beom-soo
- Cinematography: Lee Mo-gae
- Edited by: Moon In-dae
- Music by: Kim Tae-seong
- Production company: Mnet Media
- Distributed by: Showbox
- Release date: March 11, 2009 (South Korea)
- Running time: 105 minutes
- Country: South Korea
- Language: Korean
- Budget: $2 million (approx.)
- Box office: $4 million

More Than Blue (Korean: 슬픔보다 더 슬픈 이야기) is a 2009 South Korean romantic drama film. The directorial debut of poet Won Tae-yeon, it stars Kwon Sang-woo, Lee Bo-young and Lee Beom-soo in the lead roles. The film's Korean title translates as "A Story Sadder Than Sadness". In 2018, a Taiwanese remake of the same name was released. Later, in 2021 a second Taiwanese remake was released on Netflix as a ten-episode series titled More than Blue: The Series.

== Plot ==
K and Cream first meet each other in high school & both are orphans; K was abandoned by his mother after his father died of cancer who nevertheless left him a sizeable sum of money, while Cream lost her entire family. The two become soulmates and decided to share a home. Knowing that Cream's biggest fear is to be left alone, K keeps the fact that he has leukemia a secret, and instead urges her to marry a kind and healthy man. When Cream announces that she is in love with an affluent dentist, K is left heartbroken, but he is satisfied that she has met her ideal partner.

Believing Cream has really found someone she loves, K asked Joo-hwan's fiancée to break up with him. Joo-hwan's fiancée agrees under the condition that K lets her take photographs of him for her exhibit about death. It is revealed that Cream first learned about K's illness when she rummaged through his belongings to find inspiration to write a song, but in fact turned out to be pain medication for terminal cancer patients. Earlier in the series, Cream with her knowledge of K's illness, decided to test him and asked K, "What defines as a good man?" To which K replied to find a good and healthy man to spend her life with. With her knowledge of his illness, Cream thus faked falling in love with Joo-hwan, in order to appease K. This perspective of Cream's is revealed in her diary.

K's health takes a drastic turn, K and Cream spend their last day celebrating Cream's birthday. Cream asks what K wishes for and which he replies, It's a secret. Cream teases K saying that she doesn't believe in it and has given him her wish just years before. She reveals that she wishes that in the next lifetime, that he can find her sooner. K replies, idiot, and that he will definitely find each other in the next life time. As they take there last picture together as a family, K passes away.

In the end, Cream apologises to Joo-hwan for cheating him and Joo-hwan then visits their grave, implying Cream committed suicide after K's death.

== Cast ==
- Kwon Sang-woo as Kang Chul-gyu ("K")
- Lee Bo-young as Eun-won ("Cream")
- Lee Beom-soo as Cha Joo-hwan
- Jung Ae-yeon as Jenna
- Lee Han-wi as President Kim
- Shin Hyun-tak as Min-cheol
- Kim Jeong-seok as Organization manager
- Seon Ho-jin as DJ Sapami
- Park Yeong-jin as Handsome guy at guardhouse
- Jung Joon-ho as President Im
- Kim Do-yeon as Screenwriter
- Lee Seung-chul as Singer A
- Ji Dae-han as Singer A's audio engineer
- Nam Gyu-ri as Catgirl
- Kim Heung-gook as Traffic broadcast DJ

== Production ==
More Than Blue marked the directorial debut of poet Won Tae-yeon, who also wrote the script. The film was made on a budget of just under US$2 million, with all three of the main cast members investing a portion of their salaries into the production. Lead actor Kwon Sang-woo drew inspiration from his own then-recent marriage, saying, "I think being married enables me to think more deeply about playing melodramatic parts... K braves his circumstances for love, and I thought I might have done the same if I were in his shoes".

== Release ==
More Than Blue was released in South Korea on 11 March 2009, and topped the domestic box office on its opening weekend with 256,809 admissions. The film had grossed $3,577,302 in South Korea by 12 April 2009, and had accumulated a total of 724,206 admissions as of 19 April 2019, with a total gross of ₩4,774,850,499 ($3,739,320) in South Korea.

Overseas, the film grossed US$218,272 in Hong Kong, bringing the film's total gross to $3,957,592 in East Asia.

== Critical response ==
Lee Hyo-won of The Korea Times commented that despite its familiar premise, More Than Blue "feels more classic than clichéd and the undying fidelity of the love-struck characters nostalgically evokes old romances. The talented actors also bring freshness to their parts, making them very believable and worthy of every ounce of one's empathy." Kwon Sang-woo in particular was singled out for his performance, with Lee commenting, "Kwon wins the audience's heart by bringing a certain tenderness to his character, suggesting a maturation in his acting, a palpable break away from his previous roles as a romantic tough guy."
