= Koo Hye-sun =

South Korean actress (born 1984)

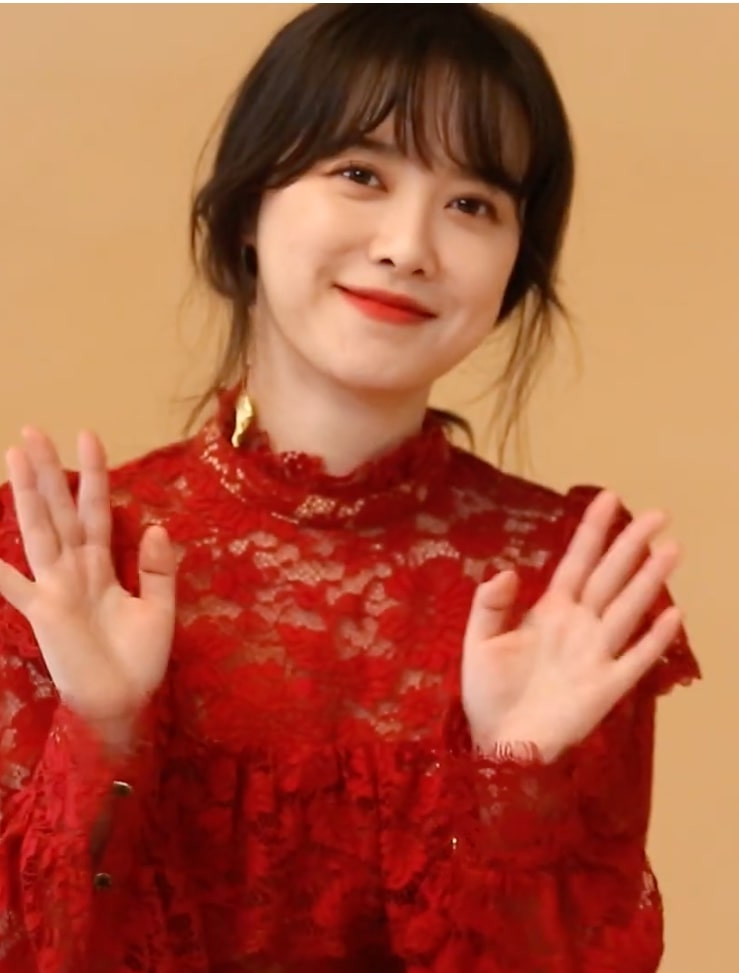
- Koo in September 2020
- Born: November 9, 1984 (age 41); Incheon, South Korea
- Education: Korea Advanced Institute of Science and Technology; Sungkyunkwan University
- Occupations: Actress; singer-songwriter; director; artist
- Years active: 2002–present
- Agents: Mimi Entertainment; IOK Company
- Spouse: Ahn Jae-hyun (m. 2016; div. 2019)

Korean name
- Hangul: 구혜선
- Hanja: 具惠善
- RR: Gu Hyeseon
- MR: Ku Hyesŏn

Koo Hye-sun (Korean: 구혜선; born November 9, 1984) is a South Korean actress, singer-songwriter, director and artist. She gained widespread recognition in the television dramas Hearts of Nineteen (2006), The King And I (2007), Boys Over Flowers (2009), Take Care of Us, Captain (2012), Angel Eyes (2014), Blood (2015).

== Career ==
=== As actress ===
Koo Hye-sun entered the entertainment industry after gaining popularity on the Internet as an ulzzang. She used to be a trainee under SM Entertainment, before switching over to DSP Media and preparing to debut in a girl group called Ria. But after it didn't work out she then signed under YG Entertainment. Originally set to debut as a singer (supposedly in a three-member girl group with 2NE1's Park Bom and Sandara Park), YG Entertainment CEO Yang Hyun-suk advised Koo to pursue acting rather than music. She made her debut in a CF for Sambo computers and then made her television debut in the KBS horror series Anagram, and continued to appear in one-act dramas. Her performance as Hye-jin in the 2004 MBC sitcom Nonstop 5 attracted the audience's attention.

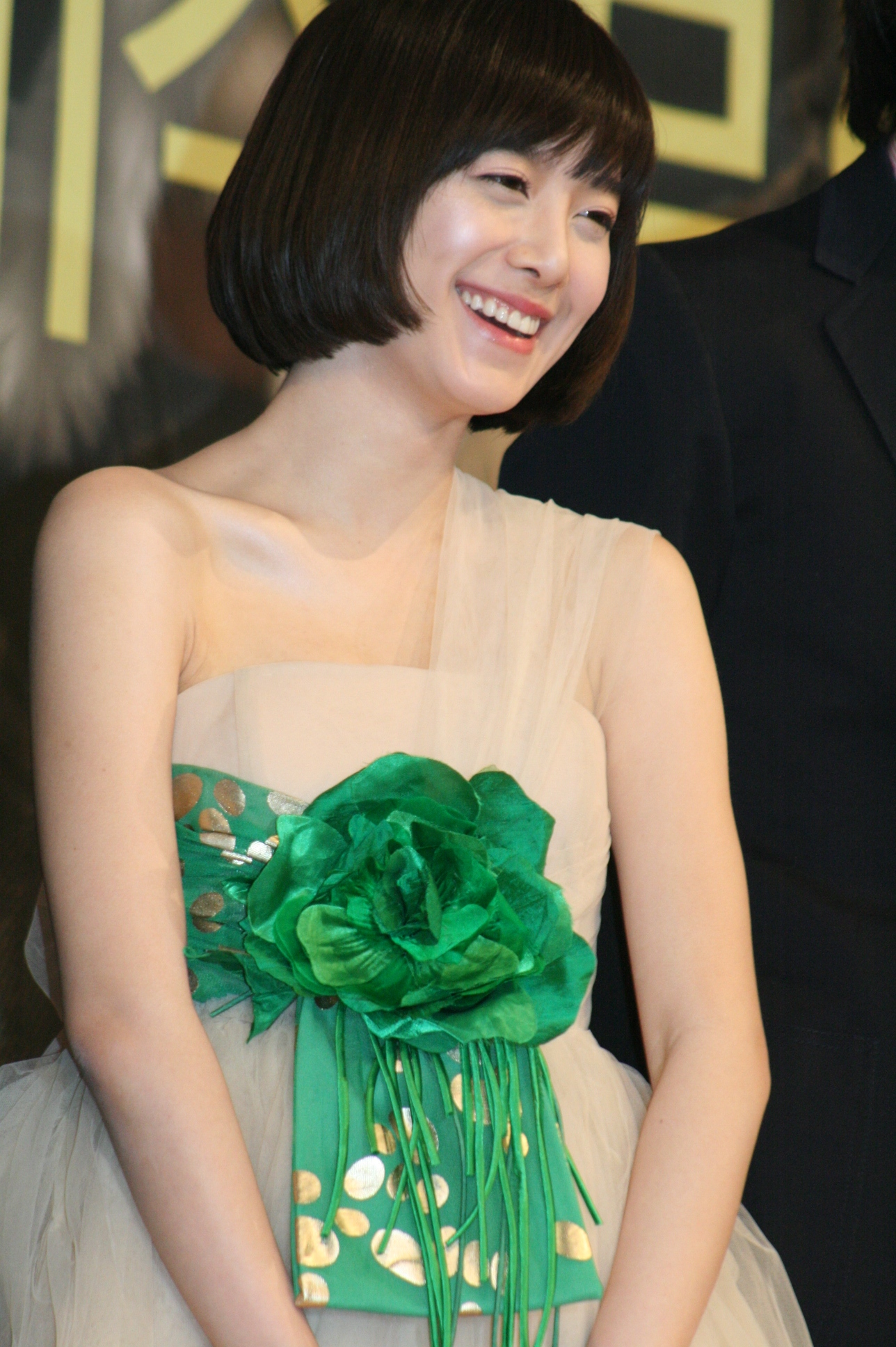
In December 2008

Koo soon rose to fame in the 2006 television drama Hearts of Nineteen and surprised critics with her performance in the historical drama The King and I. She then starred in the historical drama Strongest Chil Woo.

Koo rose to fame for her role as Geum Jan-di in the mega hit KBS2 drama Boys Over Flowers opposite Lee Min-ho, which gained her pan-Asia popularity.

After a year in limbo with no broadcasting slot, her first pre-produced drama The Musical finally aired in September 2011. Koo next starred as a female pilot in the SBS series Take Care of Us, Captain, followed by Absolute Darling, the Taiwanese drama adaptation of the manga Absolute Boyfriend.

After two years break from acting career, Koo appears in MBC channel's two-part documentary drama Heo Nanseolheon. She took part in the program's narration and production as well.

Koo then made a small screen comeback acting in SBS's weekend drama Angel Eyes in 2014. She played a legally blind woman who gets her vision back in an operation and decides to embrace life with passion by becoming an emergency rescue worker.

In February 2015, Koo starred in KBS's vampire drama Blood. She plays an arrogant genius physician who entered medical school at a young age of 17. Blood suffered low ratings in Korea and was criticized for her acting. On November 6, 2015, Koo was confirmed to be starring in a Chinese drama The Legendary Tycoon which tells the life story of Run Run Shaw, a self-made entertainment mogul from Hong Kong.

Koo was cast in the MBC's weekend drama You're Too Much alongside Uhm Jung-hwa. However, she left the show after two weeks for health reasons.

In June 2019, Koo signed with HB Entertainment, same agency as her ex-husband Ahn Jae-hyun. Koo contract with HB Entertainment was terminated on April 29, 2020, after it was initiated by her. On July 23, 2020, Koo signed with Mimi Entertainment. On November 8, 2021, Koo signed with IOK Company.

=== As singer-songwriter ===
In recent years, Koo has displayed her vocal talents through soundtrack releases as well as digital singles. In 2005, she released her first single "Happy Birthday to You" for Nonstop 5. In 2006, she released the track "Sarang Ga" ("Love Story"), which became the title song of Hearts of Nineteen. In 2012, Koo released her first self-composed soundtrack, titled "Fly Again" for SBS's Take Care of Us, Captain, which she stars in.

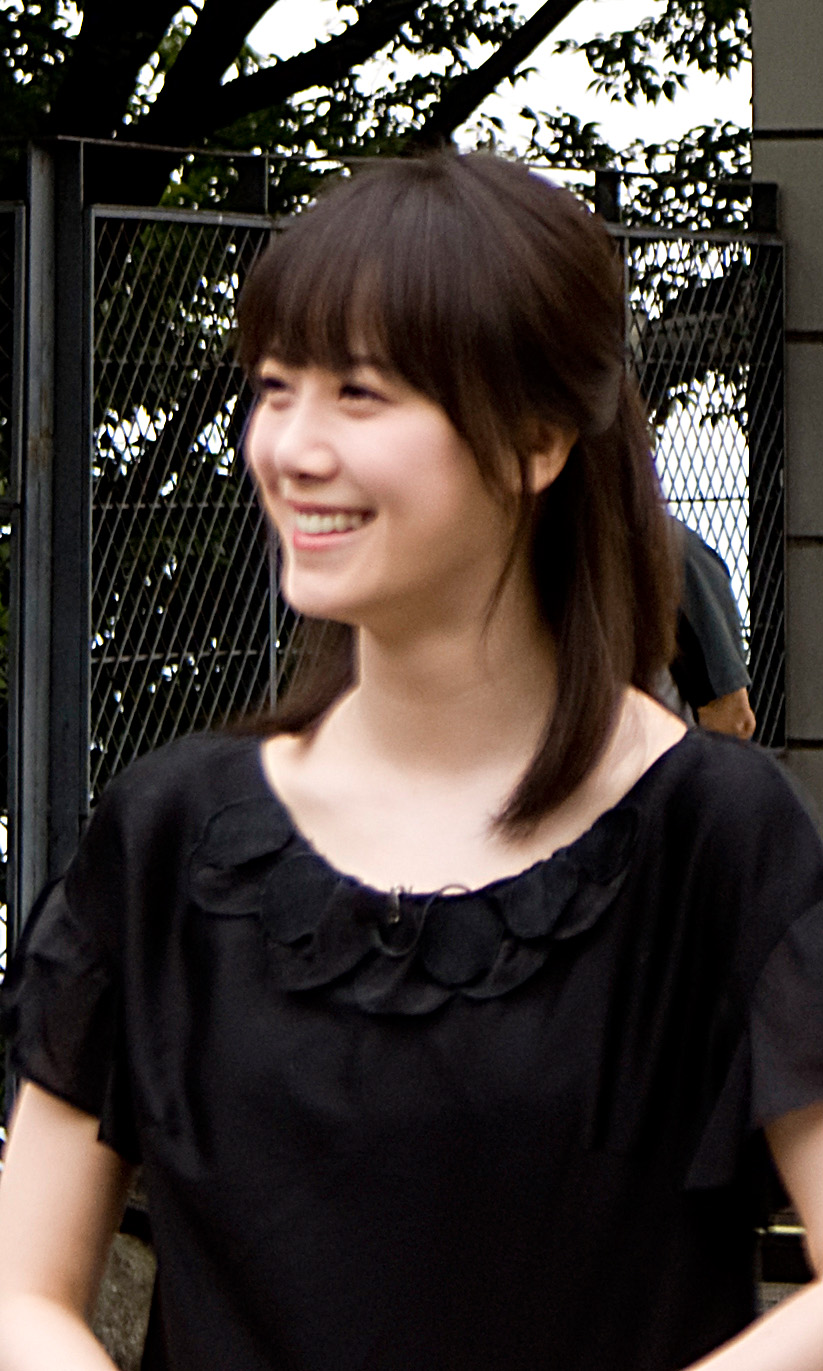
In July 2009

Koo released her first album Breath in 2009, an album of new-age music which included her composed song for her friend and singer, Gummy, entitled "Around the Alley". She then released her self composed and written digital single "Brown Hair" in 2010, with the music rearranged by bossa nova pianist Choi In-young. In 2012, Koo released "It's You" and its music video. She not only wrote the music and lyrics of "It's You", but also filmed and edited the music video. In 2014, Koo released her 5th digital single "Happy", which is also a remake to Seo In-guk's song "Were We Happy". She released another self-written single titled "Must" the same year, which also serves as the soundtrack of her film Daughter.

In 2015, she released a second album titled Breath 2, which serves as a follow-up to her 2009 album Breath. The title track "After 10 Years 100 Years" is a remake of the OST from the film The Peach Tree. Koo held her first concert the same year.

In 2016, Koo released the song "Written and Erased", which is a collaboration song of Koo with The Blind. On April 28, she released her first regular album And Spring that consist of 11 tracks including her singles "Stupid", "Brown Hair", and "It's You."

In May 2022, Koo released Piano New Age Best Album on May 6, 2022.

=== As director ===
Koo made her debut as a director through her short film The Madonna. The film which was centered around the topic of assisted suicide, debuted at the 2009 Puchon International Fantastic Film Festival. The film was featured in several film events, including the Asiana International Short Film Festival and the Pusan Asian Short Film Festival where it won "Audience Award" category. The Madonna also won the "Spotlight Award" at the 12th Short Shorts Film Festival which was held in Tokyo from June 10 through 20, 2010. She shared that the reason of herself making film was "It's not like I dreamed of becoming a filmmaker since I was young. I'm interested in many things, including music, art and literature, and I thought I could incorporate all those things by making a film."

The following year, Koo directed her first feature-length film Magic. The film was invited and screened at the 6th Jecheon International Music & Film Festival (JIMFF) from August 12 to 17, 2010 and the 23rd Annual Tokyo International Film Festival. She continued directing short films such as You (2010) Fragments of Sweet Memories (2012), as well as trailers for film festivals. Fragment of Sweet Memories was selected as one of Korea's outstanding 3D films, and was shown at the Cinemountain in Busan Cinema Center during the International 3D Festival (I3DF), which Koo serves as the promotional ambassador of. The film was also selected as a finalist for the Seoul Senior Film Festival, and received citation from the Mayor Park Won-soon.

In 2011, Koo established her own company, Koo Hye-sun Film, under which she would produce and film her projects. Her second directorial feature The Peach Tree was the first film made under her newly established production company. She also wrote the theme song and novel version of the film. On October 25, 2012, she was awarded the Minister Commendation at the 14th Annual Republic of Korea Design Award for The Peach Tree.

In 2013, Koo directed a short film for Samsung Galaxy S4, as part of the project "Story of Me and S4". The same year, she served as the jury for the 9th Jecheon International Music and Film Festival.

In 2014, Koo released her fifth directed film, Daughter. Not only did she took part in producing, script-writing and directing of the movie, she also plays the main character as a mother who gives her daughter an oppressive corporal punishment. The film aims to address and make known to society the problems of child abuse. Daughter was invited to Busan International Film Festival.

In 2021, her short film Dark Yellow had a special screening at 25th Bucheon International Fantastic Film Festival on July 11. She addressed a press conference and met with the audience. She also acted in the film as a woman working at a flower shop.

In 2022, Koo was a judge at the Chunsa Film Art Awards 2022 Film Festival.

=== As artist and an ambassador ===
Aside from her acting and directional works, Koo participates in a wide range of projects, including writing and drawing as well as ambassador activities. In recognition of her versatility and talents, Koo was voted as the Best Female Artist in the Entertainment Industry in 2012. She also received the Korea Fulfillment Award, and the Ministry Award for "sharing happiness" for her charitable acts.

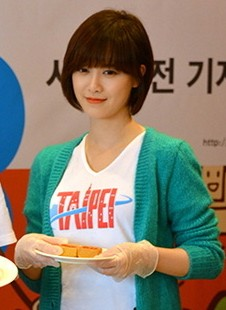
In May 2013

In 2009, Koo published her first illustrated novel Tango (탱고), centered around a 20-something young girl who goes through two separate relationships to finally mature into a woman. The book was a bestseller, selling 30,000 copies within a week. Its release coincided with her first solo art exhibition, also titled "Tango" which was held in July 2009 at La Mer Gallery and attracted a total of 10,000 visitors. The exhibition featured around 40 of Koo's illustrations, some from her novel. She held her second art exhibition in 2012, titled "Afterimage" at the Hangaram Design Arts Center in the Seoul Arts Center. She donated all proceeds from the sale of her artwork toward purchasing "clean cars" (germ-free automobiles) for the Korea Leukemia Patient Group.

From August 17 to 31, 2013, she held exhibition entitled "Anything That Leaves Yearning Is All Beautiful". The same year, Koo attended the Hong Kong Contemporary Art Fair. The illustration poster of her cat 'Mango' will be sold at this exhibition, where the profit will be donated to charity organization 'Community Chest Hong Kong'. Koo was also appointed as the 2013 Cheongju International Craft Biennale (CICB) ambassador, as well as the ambassador for ArtisTree, an organization to encourage arts.

== Personal life ==
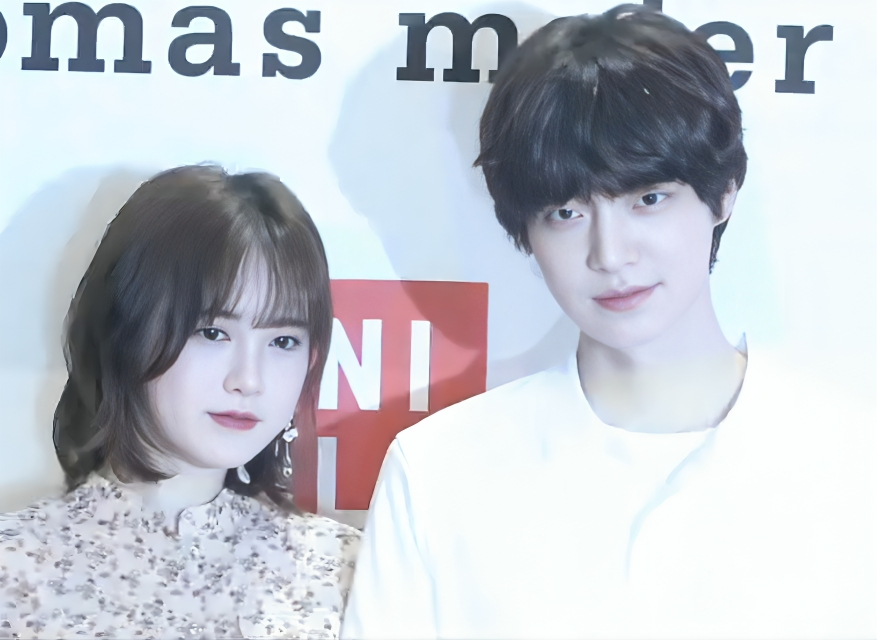
Koo and Ahn in 2018

On March 11, 2016, Koo was confirmed to be dating her Blood co-star Ahn Jae-hyun since April 2015. The couple officially registered their marriage at the Gangnam district office on May 20, 2016, and married on May 21, 2016. They announced that instead of holding a wedding party, they would donate the money to the pediatric ward of Severance Hospital. The pair appeared in the reality show Newlywed Diary produced by Na Young-seok, which showcased their married life.

In August 2019, it was reported Ahn requested a divorce from Koo. On August 18, 2019, Koo posted an image of text messages between her and her husband Ahn Jae-hyun discussing divorce to her Instagram account. Another image was posted with a caption that explained she wanted to preserve her marriage, while Ahn did not. The posts were later deleted. Koo suffered numerous malicious comments on social media every time she criticized Ahn publicly. Ahn submitted an application to the Seoul Family Court on September 9, 2019, for divorce against Koo, and it was delivered to Koo on September 18, 2019.

On September 1, 2019, Koo revealed in Instagram post that she would be taking a break from the entertainment industry to resume college.

== Philanthropy ==
On July 12, 2022, Koo made a donation to her alma mater, Sungkyunkwan University, to help the needy through the Senior Love Learning Support Fund. The prize money came from the 24th Short Shorts International Short Film Festival.

In December 2022, Koo donated a trusted pet companion animal separation anxiety and anxiety solution to Korea Abandoned Animal Welfare Association.

== Filmography ==
=== As actress ===
==== Film ====
| Year | Title | Role | Notes |
|---|---|---|---|
| 2007 | August Rush | Girl on couch | Cameo; american production |
| 2014 | Daughter | San | Also director and screenwriter |

==== Television series ====
| Year | Title | Role | Notes |
|---|---|---|---|
| 2004 | Nonstop 5 | Hye-sun | |
| 2004 | Anagram | Nurse | Drama City |
| 2005 | All Together Cha Cha Cha | Yeong-ae | Drama City |
| 2005 | Ballad of Seodong | Eun-jin | |
| 2006 | Hearts of Nineteen | Yang Guk-hwa | |
| 2007 | The King and I | Queen Je-heon / Yoon So-hwa | |
| 2008 | Strongest Chil Woo | Yoon So-yoon | |
| 2009 | Boys Over Flowers | Geum Jan-di | |
| 2010 | Ku Cine | Herself | |
| 2011 | The Musical | Go Eun-bi | |
| 2012 | Take Care of Us, Captain | Han Da-jin | |
| 2012 | Absolute Boyfriend | Guan Xiao Fei | Taiwanese drama |
| 2014 | Angel Eyes | Yoon Soo-wan | |
| 2015 | Blood | Yoo Ri-ta / Yoo Chae-yoon | |
| 2017 | You Are Too Much | Jung Hae-dang | Eps. 1–6 (Note: replaced by Jang Hee-jin) |

==== Narration ====
| Year | Title | Notes | Ref. |
|---|---|---|---|
| 2012 | The Hospice for the Children Who Live for Today | | |
| 2013 | Prime | I Love Wood segment | |
| 2014 | Heo Nanseolheon | Also director and actor; documentary | |
| 2014 | Miracles in December | Angel Bread segment | |
| 2016 | Rookie | | |

==== Reality show ====
| Year | Title | Role | Notes |
|---|---|---|---|
| 2017 | The Lovebirds | Cast member | With Ahn Jae-hyun (Episode 1–6) |

==== Music video appearances ====
| Year | Song title | Artist |
|---|---|---|
| 2002 | "We Make a Good Pair" | Sung Si-kyung |
| 2004 | "The Reason I Close My Eyes" | Taebin |
| 2006 | "Forget You" | Soul Star |
| 2007 | "Yesterday Is Different from Today" | Kim Ji-eun |
| 2010 | "Touch Your Heart" | Fahrenheit |
| 2010 | "Brown Hair" | Koo Hye-sun |
| 2012 | "Marry Me" | Koo Hye-sun |
| 2013 | "With Laughter or with Tears" | Seo In-guk |
| 2013 | "It's You" | Koo Hye-sun |
| 2013 | "Happy" | Koo Hye-sun |
| 2014 | "She's So High" | Beatburger |
| 2014 | "Floral Rain" | Koo Hye-sun |
| 2015 | "After 10 Years 100 Years" | Koo Hye-sun |
| 2015 | "A Day Without Sound" | Koo Hye-sun |

=== As director ===
==== Feature film ====
| Year | Title | Credited as | Cast | Ref. |
|---|---|---|---|---|
| 2010 | Magic | Director, screenwriter, cameo | Im Ji-kyu; Seo Hyun-jin; Kim Jung-wook | |
| 2012 | The Peach Tree | Director, screenwriter, music director | Cho Seung-woo; Ryu Deok-hwan; Nam Sang-mi | |
| 2014 | Daughter | Director, screenwriter, actor | Koo Hye-sun; Shim Hye-jin | |

==== Short film ====
| Year | Title | Credited as | Cast | Ref. |
|---|---|---|---|---|
| 2009 | The Madonna (aka The Cheerful Caretaker) | Director, screenwriter, editor | Seo Hyun-jin; Kim Myung-soo; Jun Tae-soo | |
| 2010 | You | Director, screenwriter | Nam Sang-mi; Choi Il-hwa | |
| 2012 | Fragments of Sweet Memories (3D) | Director, screenwriter, music director | Yoo Seung-ho; Choi Il-hwa; Ryu Young-jae; Yang Hyun-mo; Yang Kyung-mo; Seo Hyun-jin | |
| 2013 | White Dog (Samsung Galaxy S4) | Director, singer of theme song | Cristina Fernandez Lee; Moon Mason; Koo Hye-sun | |
| 2018 | Mystery Pink | Director, Screenwriter | Seo Hyun-jin; Yang Dong-geun; Yoon Da-kyoung; Hyun Seung-min; Park Jeong-uk | |
| 2021 | Dark Yellow | Director, Screenwriter | Ahn Seo-hyun; Im Ji-kyu; Yeon Je-hwan; Yoon Hyuk-jin | |

==== Trailer ====
| Year | Event | Cast | Ref. |
|---|---|---|---|
| 2009 | 7th Asiana International Short Film Festival | Seo Hyun-jin | |
| 2011 | 13th International Women's Film Festival in Seoul | Koo Hye-sun | |
| 2013 | 14th Persons with Disabilities Film Festival | Koo Hye-sun | |
| 2014 | 10th Jecheon International Music & Film Festival | Koo Hye-sun, Seong Seung-han, Choi In-young | |

== Discography ==
=== Albums ===
| Year | Album | Label | Notes | Ref. |
|---|---|---|---|---|
| 2009 | Breath | YG Entertainment | Singer, composer | |
| 2015 | Breath 2 | YG Entertainment | Singer, composer | |
| 2016 | And Spring | YG Entertainment | Singer, composer | |
| 2020 | Breath 3 | YG Plus | Composer | |
| 2021 | Breath 4 | YG Plus | Composer | |

=== Singles ===
| Year | Title | Album | Label | Notes | Ref. |
|---|---|---|---|---|---|
| 2005 | "Happy Birthday to You" | Nonstop 5 OST | EMI | Singer | |
| 2006 | "Sarang Ga (Love Story)" | Hearts of Nineteen OST | YG Entertainment | Singer | |
| 2010 | "Brown Hair" | | YG Entertainment | Singer, composer | |
| 2012 | "Fly Again" | Take Care of Us, Captain OST | Pony Canyon | Composer | |
| 2012 | "Marry Me" | | YG Entertainment | Singer, composer | |
| 2013 | "Flying Galaxy" | | YG Entertainment | Singer, composer | |
| 2013 | "It's You" | | YG Entertainment | Singer, composer | |
| 2013 | "Happy" | | YG Entertainment | Singer, composer | |
| 2014 | "Floral Rain" | | YG Entertainment | Singer, composer | |
| 2014 | "Must" | | YG Entertainment | Singer, composer | |
| 2015 | "A Day Without Sound" | | YG Entertainment | Singer | |
| 2016 | "Written and Erased" | | YG Entertainment | In collaboration with The Blind | |
| 2016 | "Winter Story" | | YG Entertainment | for Newlywed Diary | |
| 2016 | "Summer Day" | | YG Entertainment | for Newlywed Diary | |

== Concert ==
| Year | Concert | Artist |
|---|---|---|
| 2009 | With You | Koo Hye-sun participated in Isao Sasaki's concert |
| 2009 | Over the Rainbow | Koo Hye-sun, Isao Sasaki |
| 2015 | Summer, Autumn, Winter, and Spring | Koo Hye-sun, Choi In-young |
| 2021 | New Age Piano Concert | Koo Hye Sun, Choi In-young |

== Bibliography ==
| Year | Title | Notes | Ref. |
|---|---|---|---|
| 2009 | Tango | Novel | |
| 2010 | Koo Hye-sun's The Story Behind the Making of "Magic" | Non-fiction | |
| 2012 | The Peach Tree | Novelization | |
| 2017 | Koo Hye Sun's Music Collection | Music Book | |
| 2018 | Koo Hye Sun's Scenario Collection | Scenario Book | |
| 2019 | Heart Shaped Tears | Novel | |
| 2019 | I am Your Pet | Non-fiction | |

== Art exhibitions ==
| Year | Title | Location | Notes | Ref. |
|---|---|---|---|---|
| 2009 | Tango | La Mer Gallery, South Korea | Solo exhibition | |
| 2012 | Red Bull Collective Art | Gwanggyo Gallery, Cheonggyecheon | Participation | |
| 2012 | Afterimage | Hangaram Design Arts Center, Seoul Arts Center | Solo exhibition | |
| 2013 | Afterimage | Harbor City Gallery, Hong Kong | Solo exhibition | |
| 2013 | Anything That Leaves Yearning Is All Beautiful | Korean Cultural Center in Shanghai | Solo exhibition | |
| 2016 | Dark Yellow | MBC Sangam-dong, Mapo District, Seoul | Participated in "We, 颜(Face)" the DMC Festival 2016 | |
| 2017 | Dark Yellow | Hangaram Art Museum, Seoul | Solo Exhibition | |
| 2018 | Mystery Pink | Hangaram Art Museum, Seoul | Solo Exhibition | |
| 2018 | Non Existence | Galerie 89, Paris | Solo Exhibition | |
| 2019 | A World Without You, Stillness For Me | Jinsan Gallery, Seoul | Solo Exhibition | |
| 2020 | Voyage: Again and Again | Jinsan Gallery, Seoul | Solo Exhibition | |
| 2021 | Koo Hye Sun's New Age Under Seo Tai-ji Lyrics | Hangaram Art Museum, Seoul | Solo Exhibition | |

== Fashion ==
- André Kim's Fashion Show with Song Chang-eui (2009)
- Lie Sang Bong's Fashion Show at CICB (2013)

== Ambassadorship ==
- 2012: Goodwill Ambassador for International 3D Festival
- 2013: Promotional Ambassador for Cheongju International Craft Biennale
- 2013: Promotional Ambassador for Artistree
- 2013: Honorary Ambassador for 14th Persons with Disabilities Film Festival
- 2015: Honorary Ambassador for Seoul 2015 International Blind Sports Association (IBSA) World Games
- 2015: Honorary Ambassador for Korean Leukemia Association
- 2016: Honorary Ambassador for Social Contribution Donation Bank
- 2022: Ambassador for the 2nd Global Art Fair
- 2022: Public Relations Ambassador for Yangju Barrier-Free Film Festival 2022

== Awards and nominations ==
Year presented, name of the award ceremony, award category, nominated work and the result of the nomination
| Year | Award | Category | Nominated work | Result |
|---|---|---|---|---|
| 2006 | KBS Drama Awards | Best New Actress | Hearts of Nineteen | Won |
| 2006 | KBS Drama Awards | Popularity Award, Actress | Hearts of Nineteen | Won |
| 2006 | KBS Drama Awards | Best Couple Award with Seo Ji-seok | Hearts of Nineteen | Nominated |
| 2007 | 43rd Baeksang Arts Awards | Best New Actress (TV) | Hearts of Nineteen | Nominated |
| 2007 | SBS Drama Awards | New Star Award | The King and I | Won |
| 2008 | KBS Drama Awards | Netizen Award, Actress | Strongest Chil Woo | Nominated |
| 2008 | KBS Drama Awards | Best Couple Award with Eric Mun | Strongest Chil Woo | Nominated |
| 2009 | 26th Pusan Asian Short Film Festival | Audience Award | The Madonna | Won |
| 2009 | 4th Andre Kim Best Star Awards | Best Female Star | Boys Over Flowers | Won |
| 2009 | 6th Yahoo! Taiwan Asia Buzz Awards | Best Asian Actress | Boys Over Flowers | Won |
| 2009 | KBS Drama Awards | Top Excellence Award, Actress | Boys Over Flowers | Won |
| 2009 | KBS Drama Awards | Excellence Award, Actress in a Mid-length Drama | Boys Over Flowers | Won |
| 2009 | KBS Drama Awards | Netizen Award, Actress | Boys Over Flowers | Won |
| 2009 | KBS Drama Awards | Best Couple Award with Lee Min-ho | Boys Over Flowers | Won |
| 2009 | 14th Asian Television Awards | Best Drama Actress | Boys Over Flowers | Nominated |
| 2009 | 3rd Mnet 20's Choice Awards | Hot Drama Star (Female) | Boys Over Flowers | Nominated |
| 2010 | 12th Short Shorts Film Festival & Asia | Spotlight Award | The Madonna | Won |
| 2010 | 23rd Tokyo International Film Festival | Best Asian-Middle Eastern Film | Magic | Nominated |
| 2011 | 5th Mnet 20's Choice Awards | Popular Star Award, Actress | —N/a | Won |
| 2012 | 31st Brussels International Fantastic Film Festival | Orbit Competition | The Peach Tree | Nominated |
| 2012 | SBS Drama Awards | Top Excellence Award, Actress in a Drama Special | Take Care of Us, Captain | Nominated |
| 2012 | Korea Fulfillment Awards | Grand Prize (Daesang) | —N/a | Won |
| 2012 | 14th Annual Republic of Korea Design Award by Ministry of Knowledge Economy | Design Merits Division-Minister Commendation Award | —N/a | Won |
| 2013 | Ministry of Health and Welfare | 2nd Happiness Sharing Talent Award | —N/a | Won |
| 2014 | Ministry of Gender Equality and Family | Grand Prize in Gender Equality | —N/a | Won |
| 2014 | SBS Drama Awards | Excellence Award, Actress in a Drama Special | Angel Eyes | Won |
| 2014 | SBS Drama Awards | Best Couple Award with Lee Sang-yoon | Angel Eyes | Won |
| 2014 | Asian Drama Awards Pilipinas | Best Actress of the Year 2014 | Angel Eyes | Won |
| 2014 | Asian Drama Awards Pilipinas | Best Couple Award with Lee Sang-yoon | Angel Eyes | Won |
| 2014 | 6th Seoul Senior Film Festival | Best Young Director | —N/a | Won |
| 2015 | KBS Drama Awards | Netizen Award, Actress | Blood | Nominated |
| 2015 | KBS Drama Awards | Best Couple Award with Ahn Jae-hyun | Blood | Nominated |
| 2015 | WorldFest-Houston International Film Festival | Grand Remi Award in the Biography & Autobiography Category | Heo Nanseolheon | Won |
| 2022 | 24th Short Shorts Film Festival & Asia | Audience Award | Dark Yellow | Won |
| 2022 | Art Korea Broadcasting Culture and Arts Awards | Person of the Year | —N/a | Won |
| 2025 | Thailand Headline Person of the Year Awards | Asian Artist Award | —N/a | Won |
