= Lee Eon =

South Korean actor and model

- Portrait of Lee
- Born: Park Sang-min; 5 February 1981; Busan, South Korea
- Died: 21 August 2008 (aged 27); Hannam-dong, Seoul, South Korea
- Occupations: Actor; model
- Years active: 1999–2008

Korean name
- Hangul: 박상민
- RR: Bak Sangmin
- MR: Pak Sangmin

Stage name
- Hangul: 이언
- RR: I Eon
- MR: I Ŏn

Lee Eon (Korean: 이언; 5 February 1981 – 21 August 2008) was a South Korean actor and model best known for his performance in the Korean television series Coffee Prince.

== Early life and career ==
Lee Eon was born Park Sang-min on 5 February 1981. Lee began practicing ssireum while in elementary school, going on to win gold medals at Korean national ssireum competitions in 1997 and 1998. As a freshman at university, he was inspired by Cha Seung-won to become a model, and after losing 30 kg (66 lb) made his debut at a fashion show in Busan in 1999. His later fashion show appearances included the Seoul Fashion Artists Association Collection.

Lee branched out into acting, making his film debut in 2006; he played a ssireum wrestler in Like a Virgin, putting his skills to good use and helping lead actor Ryu Deok-hwan learn the moves. He later appeared in the 2007 hit drama series Coffee Prince, and made his final appearance in KBS period drama Strongest Chil Woo.

== Death and commemorations ==
Lee died in a motorcycle accident on 21 August 2008. He had been riding home from a party celebrating the airing of the last episode of Strongest Chil Woo, when his motorcycle hit the guardrail of an overpass in Hannam-dong, Seoul, at around 2 a.m. He died at the scene from a broken neck and was taken to the nearby Soonchunhyang University Hospital. Many of his colleagues attended his funeral, including Gong Yoo, his co-star in Coffee Prince, who took leave from his military service to hold Lee's memorial tablet in the procession to the grave site.

== Filmography ==
Year	Title	Role
2006	Like a Virgin	Park Joon-woo
2007	When Spring Comes (TV)	Gi-dong
2007	Coffee Prince (TV)	Hwang Min-yeop
2008	Who Are You? (TV)	Kwon Yong-deok
2008	Strongest Chil Woo (TV)	Ja-ja

== Awards and nominations ==
Year	Award	Category	Nominated work	Result
2007	1st Korea Drama Awards	Most Popular Actor	Coffee Prince	Won
2007	MBC Drama Awards	Best New Actor	Coffee Prince	Nominated
