= Lee Hae-jun =

South Korean film director and screenwriter

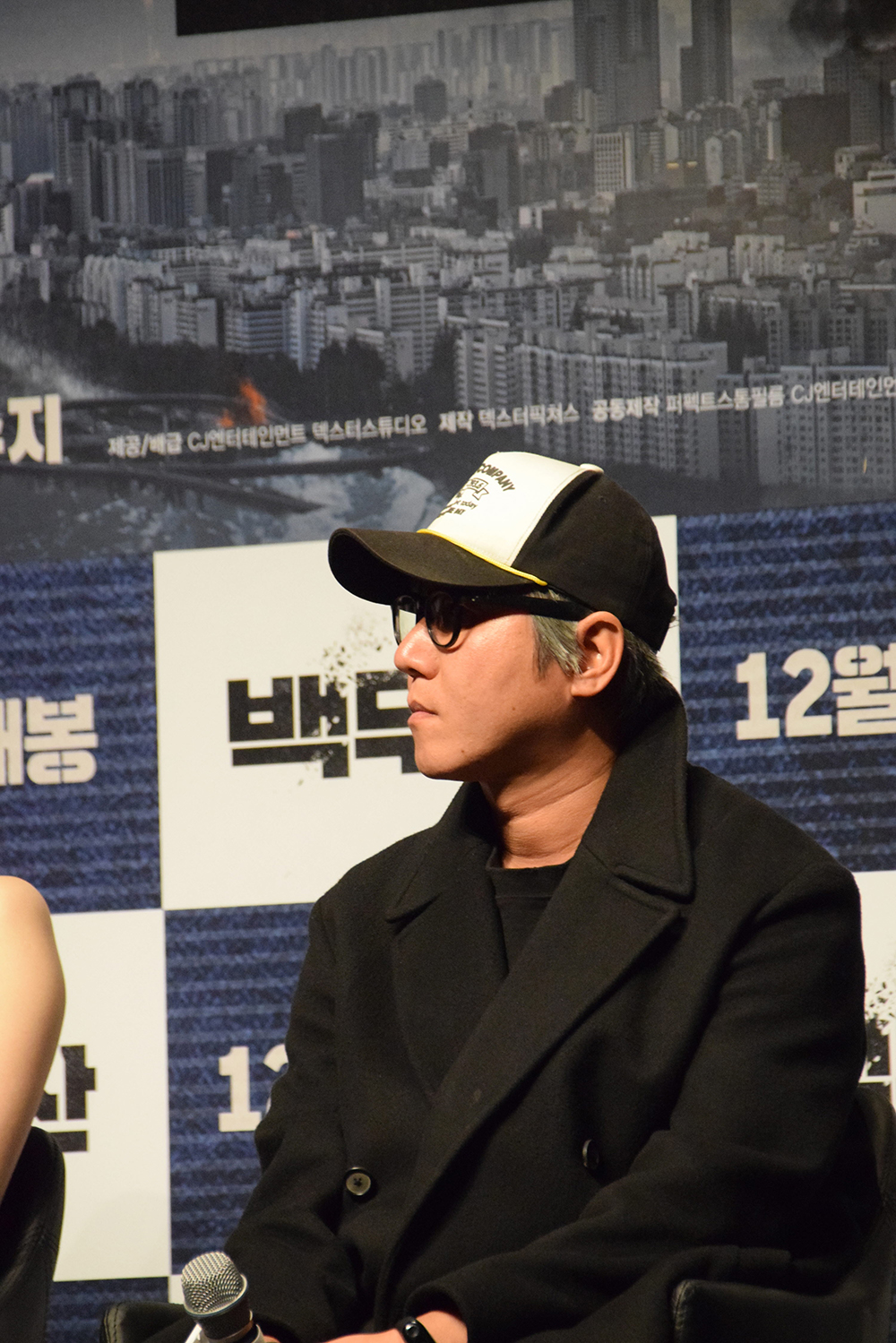
- Born: August 18, 1973 (age 53); Seoul, South Korea
- Other names: Lee Hey-jun; Lee Hae-joon
- Education: Seoul Institute of the Arts
- Occupations: Film director, screenwriter
- Years active: 2000-present

Korean name
- Hangul: 이해준
- RR: I Haejun
- MR: I Haejun

Lee Hae-jun (born August 18, 1973) is a South Korean film director and screenwriter. He wrote and directed Like a Virgin (2006), Castaway on the Moon (2009), and My Dictator (2014).

== Career ==
=== As screenwriter ===
Lee Hae-jun studied advertising at Seoul Institute of the Arts, but he soon made a name for himself in the Korean film industry for writing screenplays in various genres, such as Kim Jee-woon's vampire short film Coming Out, Jo Keun-shik's 1980s-set high school comedy Conduct Zero (2002), Kim Jin-min's small-town romance Au Revoir, UFO (2004), and Yim Pil-sung's psychological thriller Antarctic Journal (2005).

=== Like a Virgin ===
In 2006, he and Lee Hae-young co-wrote and co-directed the coming-of-age film Like a Virgin, in which Ryu Deok-hwan played an overweight trans woman teenager who idolizes Madonna and joins the high school ssireum team, hoping to use the prize money, if they win the national tournament, for sex change surgery. The filmmakers gained praise for their directorial debut and its sensitive portrayal of a potentially controversial subject, which resulted in several nominations and awards, including Best New Director(s) at the 7th Busan Film Critics Awards, Best Screenplay and Best New Director(s) at the 27th Blue Dragon Film Awards, Best New Director(s) at the 5th Korean Film Awards, and Best Screenplay at the 43rd Baeksang Arts Awards. Like a Virgin was also invited to international film festivals, including the Generation section of the 57th Berlin International Film Festival, and the 20th Singapore International Film Festival where it won the NETPAC Award.

=== Castaway on the Moon ===
Three years later, Lee made his first solo directorial effort Castaway on the Moon (2009), in which he continued whimsically exploring themes of alienation in modern life. Titled in Korean "The Adventures of Kim" or "Kim's Island," Jung Jae-young played Mr. Kim, a businessman who after a suicide attempt gets marooned on a tiny, uninhabited island on the Han River in the middle of metropolitan Seoul, while he's observed by hikikomori Miss Kim (Jung Ryeo-won) through a telescope in her bedroom, which compels her to step outside again. Lee said that in making the quirky romantic/black comedy, he wanted to give viewers a message of hope. Like his previous film, Lee's Castaway on the Moon traveled the international film festival circuit, winning the NETPAC Award at the 29th Hawaii International Film Festival, the Black Dragon Audience Award at the 12th Udine Far East Film Festival, the Audience Award at the 9th New York Asian Film Festival, and the Special Jury Prize at the 14th Fantasia International Film Festival. In 2011, CJ Entertainment announced an American remake with Mark Waters attached as director.

Despite critical acclaim for both Like a Virgin and Castaway on the Moon, both films did not do well at the domestic box office. Lee said, "I realized that as a commercial film director I can't just make the film that I want to make... instead, I have to consider the audience. I had to understand the fact that my interests don't always match the audience's, and there was also the pressure of making a return on the investments in my film."

=== My Dictator ===
In 2014, Lee cast Sul Kyung-gu and Park Hae-il in his third film, My Dictator. Set in the 1970s, the film is about a bit part theater actor (played by Sol) whom the Korean Central Intelligence Agency hires as the body double for Kim Il Sung in the rehearsals for a historic North-South summit between Kim and Park Chung Hee. Lee spoke candidly, "I thought I could tell a story about an actor, and at the same time, about one individual who lived in tumultuous times. Moreover I felt like I could tell a story about the lives of fathers who went through those times. I once saw a photograph of my father a long time ago. He was so young. But I was curious what made my father, who had been so young, into the dictator-like father that he was now. Thinking about it, it seemed that having passed through an era rife with dictators in both the North and the South, he couldn't just stay young. [...] Like all the fathers of our time, he is awkward at communicating affectionately with his offspring. I think that hurt me a little bit, too. [...] In that way, my father was someone who made me follow his own stride. Now that father of mine has fallen into a condition where he is ill and cannot even speak properly, I want to broach and speak of the things that made me most uncomfortable with him. The greatest way I can do that is through a film. So in a sense, My Dictator is a film in which I have put my heart's desire to reconcile with my father."

== Filmography ==
- Coming Out (2000) - screenwriter
- Kick the Moon (2001) - original idea
- Conduct Zero (2002) - screenwriter
- Au Revoir, UFO (2004) - screenwriter
- Arahan (2004) - script editor
- Antarctic Journal (2005) - screenwriter
- Like a Virgin (2006) - director, screenwriter
- Castaway on the Moon (2009) - director, screenwriter
- A Hard Day (2014) - script editor
- My Dictator (2014) - director, screenwriter
- Golden Slumber (2017) - screenwriter
- Ashfall (2019) - director

== Awards and nominations ==
Year	Award	Category	Recipient	Result
2006	7th Busan Film Critics Awards	Best New Director	Like a Virgin (Note: co-wrote and co-directed with he and Lee Hae-young)	Won
2006	27th Blue Dragon Film Awards	Best New Director	Like a Virgin	Won
2006	27th Blue Dragon Film Awards	Best Screenplay	Like a Virgin	Won
2006	5th Korean Film Awards	Best New Director	Like a Virgin	Won
2006	5th Korean Film Awards	Best Screenplay	Like a Virgin	Nominated
2007	20th Singapore International Film Festival	NETPAC Award	Like a Virgin	Won
2007	43rd Baeksang Arts Awards	Best New Director	Like a Virgin	Nominated
2007	43rd Baeksang Arts Awards	Best Screenplay	Like a Virgin	Won
2007	44th Grand Bell Awards	Best Screenplay	Like a Virgin	Nominated
2009	17th Chunsa Film Art Awards	Best Screenplay	Castaway on the Moon	Won
