= The Peach Tree =

- Hangul: 복숭아 나무
- RR: Boksunga namu
- MR: Poksunga namu
- Directed by: Ku Hye-sun
- Written by: Ku Hye-sun
- Produced by: Cho Dae-eun
- Starring: Cho Seung-woo; Ryu Deok-hwan; Nam Sang-mi
- Cinematography: Kim Sun-yong
- Edited by: Kim Hyeok
- Music by: Ku Hye-sun; Choi In-young
- Production companies: Joy & Content Production
- Distributed by: Next Entertainment World
- Release dates: October 8, 2011 (Busan International Film Festival); October 31, 2012 (South Korea)
- Running time: 106 minutes
- Country: South Korea
- Language: Korean

The Peach Tree (Korean: 복숭아나무; RR: Boksunganamu) is a 2012 South Korean film directed by actress Ku Hye-sun. It stars Cho Seung-woo and Ryu Deok-hwan as conjoined twin brothers who fall in love with the same woman played by Nam Sang-mi.

The film premiered at the 2011 Busan International Film Festival, and was released in theaters a year later. In 2013 it was also invited to the Brussels International Fantastic Film Festival, Taiwan's Golden Horse Fantastic Film Festival, and the New York Asian Film Festival.

== Plot ==
Sang-hyun and Dong-hyun were born as conjoined twins with two heads sharing one body. Dong-hyun has the full control of their shared body, except his brother's head which is attached to the back of his. They can never look at each other directly since their heads are always turned in opposing directions. Dong-hyun looks "normal" as long as he wears his hoodie, which fully covers his brother's face. The two have lived nearly 30 years in a remote house with their father, who tells them not to go outside the property. However, things change when their father brings Seung-ah, a bubbly, good-hearted young artist, to the house to help Dong-hyun publish a children's book ― one of his lifelong dreams.

Despite having the same body, the brothers share little else. While Sang-hyun is patient and generous, Dong-hyun is always questioning something and extremely selfish. Dong-hyun gradually builds a grudge against Sang-hyun, blaming him for his unhappiness and isolated life. Sang-hyun, who lets his brother do whatever he wants, does not recognize his own wants and needs until he gets to know Seung-ah. And things worsen as Dong-hyun, who wants to appear as a "normal writer" for his upcoming book, desperately tries hiding what he thinks as his ultimate flaw ― his own brother.

Throughout the film, peaches appear frequently. Before the twins were born, their parents enjoyed a date near a peach tree. Near the same tree is where the young twins saw their mother for the last time, since she gradually lost her sanity and health after giving birth to them. The tree and its fruits are witness to Sang-hyun and Dong-hyun's history; it sees the twins' beginning, their loss, and their isolated dreams and experiences.

== Cast ==
- Cho Seung-woo - Sang-hyun
- Ryu Deok-hwan - Dong-hyun
- Nam Sang-mi - Park Seung-ah
- Choi Il-hwa
- Kim Hye-na - Ji-hyun
- Kim Byung-oh - Reporter Kim
- Shin Hye-jung - publishing company manager
- Baek Gyeong-min - Tae-seong
- Jeon Mi-ra
- Sun Yeong-sun
- Choi Daniel - cameo
- Lee Joon-hyuk - cameo
- Seo Hyun-jin - cameo
- Im Ji-kyu - cameo

== Music ==
Cho Seung-woo sang the track to the film's music video.
