= Daughter (2014 film) =

- Theatrical poster
- Directed by: Ku Hye-sun
- Written by: Ku Hye-sun
- Produced by: Choi Seo-young; Son Gui-yong
- Starring: Ku Hye-sun; Shim Hye-jin
- Cinematography: Yoon Ju-hwan
- Edited by: Hyun Jung-hoon
- Music by: Choi In-young
- Production company: Yes Production
- Distributed by: M-Line Distribution
- Release dates: October 4, 2014 (Busan); November 6, 2014 (South Korea)
- Running time: 84 minutes
- Country: South Korea
- Language: Korean

Daughter (Korean: 다우더; RR: Daudeo) is a 2014 South Korean drama film directed, written, and starring Ku Hye-sun.

Daughter premiered at the 19th Busan International Film Festival ahead of its theatrical release on November 6, 2014.

== Plot ==
San experienced a grim childhood and adolescence with her emotionally, verbally and physically abusive mother. Unrelentingly critical and demanding, San's mother was particularly obsessed with preventing her teenage daughter from taking full possession of her sexuality. San's only reprieve was her piano lessons with a kindly next-door neighbor, Jeong-hee. Years later, when the adult San learns that she is pregnant, she visits her estranged, terminally ill mother at the hospital. Despite awaiting her imminent death, her mother has not changed at all, and San wonders if she will ever be free of the painful memories.

== Cast ==
- Koo Hye-sun as San
  - Jung Ji-so as young San
- Shim Hye-jin as Mom
- Yoon Da-kyung as Jeong-hee
- Lee Hae-woo as Jin-woo
- Yang Hyun-mo
