= Like a Virgin (film) =

- Film poster
- Hangul: 천하장사 마돈나
- Hanja: 天下壯士 마돈나
- RR: Cheonhajangsa Madonna
- MR: Ch'ŏnhajangsa Madonna
- Directed by: Lee Hae-jun; Lee Hae-young
- Written by: Lee Hae-jun; Lee Hae-young
- Produced by: Cha Seung-jae; Kim Mi-hee; Kim Moo-ryoung; Im Choong-ryul; Yun Sang-oh
- Starring: Ryu Deok-hwan; Baek Yoon-sik; Lee Eon; Lee Sang-ah; Kim Yoon-seok
- Cinematography: Jo Yong-gyu
- Edited by: Nam Na-yeong
- Music by: Kim Hong-jib
- Distributed by: CJ Entertainment
- Release date: 31 August 2006
- Running time: 116 minutes
- Country: South Korea
- Language: Korean
- Budget: US$2.5 million
- Box office: US$3,547,188

Like a Virgin (Korean: 천하장사 마돈나; lit. 'Strong Man Under Heaven Madonna') is a 2006 South Korean comedy-drama film written and directed by Lee Hae-jun and Lee Hae-young. Ryu Deok-hwan stars in the lead role as transgender teenager Oh Dong-ku, and won several domestic awards for his performance, as well as a nomination for the Asia Pacific Screen Award Best Performance by an Actor. The film's English title is a reference to a Madonna song of the same name.

== Plot ==
Chubby high school student and Madonna-devotee Oh Dong-ku is a trans woman living with her abusive, alcoholic father. Dong-ku works part-time to save money for the sex reassignment surgery she craves. Despite being told that she has the perfect physique for ssireum, Dong-ku has no interest in taking up sports—but when she finds out about an upcoming ssireum tournament with a large cash prize going to the winner, she changes her mind and signs up for the team.

== Cast ==
- Ryu Deok-hwan as Oh Dong-ku
- Baek Yoon-sik as Coach
- Lee Sang-ah as Dong-ku's mother
- Lee Eon as Park Joon-woo
- Moon Se-yoon as Song Young-bae (Big guy 1)
- Kim Yong-hoon as Big guy 2
- Yoon Won-seok as Big guy 3
- Park Young-seo as Jong-man
- Tsuyoshi Kusanagi as Japanese teacher
- Kim Yoon-seok as Dong-ku's father
- Kim Kyeong-ik as Jin-chul
- Oh Yoon-hong as Company president's wife
- Choi Jung-woo as Company president
- Kwak Min-seok as Priest
- Kim Do-yeon as Large female employee
- Kim Won-sik as Oh Dong-chul
- Kwon Oh-jin as Worker
- Jang Nam-yeol as Homeroom teacher
- Lee Jae-gu as Employee at labor office
- Kim Tae-joon as Choir member at concert hall
- Kwon Jae-won as Lawyer

== Awards and nominations ==
Year	Award	Category	Recipient	Result
2006	7th Busan Film Critics Awards	Best New Director	Lee Hae-jun, Lee Hae-young	Won
2006	7th Busan Film Critics Awards	Best New Actor	Ryu Deok-hwan	Won
2006	27th Blue Dragon Film Awards	Best New Director	Lee Hae-jun, Lee Hae-young	Won
2006	27th Blue Dragon Film Awards	Best New Actor	Ryu Deok-hwan	Won
2006	27th Blue Dragon Film Awards	Best Screenplay	Lee Hae-jun, Lee Hae-young	Won
2006	5th Korean Film Awards	Best Actor	Ryu Deok-hwan	Nominated
2006	5th Korean Film Awards	Best New Director	Lee Hae-jun, Lee Hae-young	Won
2006	5th Korean Film Awards	Best New Actor	Moon Se-yun	Nominated
2006	5th Korean Film Awards	Best Screenplay	Lee Hae-jun, Lee Hae-young	Nominated
2006	9th Director's Cut Awards	Best New Actor	Ryu Deok-hwan	Won
2007	4th Max Movie Awards	Best New Actor	Ryu Deok-hwan	Won
2007	20th Singapore International Film Festival	NETPAC Award	Like a Virgin	Won
2007	43rd Baeksang Arts Awards	Best New Director	Lee Hae-jun, Lee Hae-young	Nominated
2007	43rd Baeksang Arts Awards	Best New Actor	Ryu Deok-hwan	Nominated
2007	43rd Baeksang Arts Awards	Best Screenplay	Lee Hae-jun, Lee Hae-young	Won
2007	11th Fantasia International Film Festival	Best Actor	Ryu Deok-hwan	Won
2007	44th Grand Bell Awards	Best New Actor	Ryu Deok-hwan	Won
2007	44th Grand Bell Awards	Best Screenplay	Lee Hae-jun, Lee Hae-young	Nominated
2007	1st Korea Movie Star Awards	Best Young Star	Ryu Deok-hwan	Won
2007	1st Asia Pacific Screen Awards	Best Actor	Ryu Deok-hwan	Nominated
