= Once in a Summer =

- Theatrical poster
- Hangul: 그해 여름
- RR: Geuhae yeoreum
- MR: Kŭhae yŏrŭm
- Directed by: Joh Keun-shik
- Written by: Kim Eun-hee
- Produced by: Park Mu-seung; Bang Chu-sung
- Starring: Lee Byung-hun; Soo Ae
- Cinematography: Lee Hyung-deok
- Edited by: Kim Sang-bum
- Music by: Shim Hyeon-jeong
- Production company: KM Culture
- Distributed by: Showbox/Mediaplex
- Release date: November 30, 2006
- Running time: 121 minutes
- Country: South Korea
- Language: Korean
- Box office: US$1,593,491

Once in a Summer (Korean: 그해 여름) is a 2006 South Korean romantic drama film directed by Joh Keun-shik. The film stars Lee Byung-hun and Soo Ae. It won Best Film and Best Director (for Joh) at the 15th Chunsa Film Art Awards in 2007.

== Plot ==
To make up for her poor performance as an assistant producer, a girl promises to have her reserved but very renowned professor appear on their television series. The show involves locating the long-lost loved ones of the participant's past. Although hesitant at first, the professor finally agrees. His story takes the assistant back 50 years—1969—when the world is in chaos.

President Park Chung Hee is a dictator and the students are furious. Suk-young and a group of his classmates travel to the country to escape the tense city and help a small village become up-to-date with newly invented technology. It is there he meets Jung-in, a very pretty girl who is the custodian of the only library. Cheerful and happy, they first run across each other when Suk-young hears Jung-in singing while hanging up laundry. Over the period of time that Suk-young is at the village, they get to know each other more. Although Jung-in is hesitant, she gradually opens up to Suk-young. However, their bumpy courtship is threatened by dark secrets that Jung-in hides about her family and their history in the village, secrets that will haunt the pair as the volatile political climate catches up with them.

== Cast ==
- Lee Byung-hun as Yun Suk-young
- Soo Ae as Seo Jung-in/Lee Jung-in
- Choi Deok-moon as Suk-young's senior
- Jeong Seok-yong as Mr. Kim
- Lee Hye-eun as Bok-ja/Elena
- Lee Se-eun as Lee Su-jin
- Na Ki-soo as Suk-young's father
- Oh Dal-su as Nam Gyun-soo
- Yoo Hae-jin as PD Kim
- Kim Kwak-kyung-hee as Condom woman
- Park Nam-hee
- Kim Jung-ki
- Ko Jun

== Release ==
Distribution rights to Japan were sold for US$4 million.

== Awards and nominations ==
Year	Award	Category	Recipient	Result.
2007	15th Chunsa Film Art Awards	Best Film	Once in a Summer	Won
2007	15th Chunsa Film Art Awards	Best Director	Joh Keun-shik	Won
2007	15th Chunsa Film Art Awards	Best Actor	Lee Byung-hun	Nominated
2007	15th Chunsa Film Art Awards	Best Actress	Soo Ae	Nominated
2007	15th Chunsa Film Art Awards	Best Supporting Actor	Oh Dal-su	Won
2007	15th Chunsa Film Art Awards	Best New Actress	Lee Se-eun	Won
2007	15th Chunsa Film Art Awards	Best Music	Shim Hyun-jung	Won
