= Lee Hae-young =

South Korean filmmaker (born 1973)

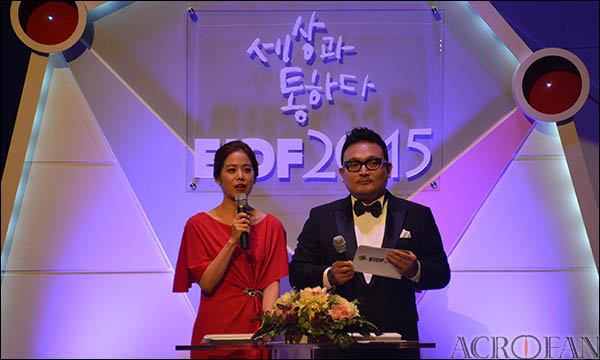
- Lee (right) in 2015
- Born: October 18, 1973 (age 52); South Korea
- Education: Seoul Institute of the Arts
- Occupations: Film director; screenwriter

Korean name
- Hangul: 이해영
- RR: I Haeyeong
- MR: I Haeyŏng

Lee Hae-young (Korean: 이해영; born 1973) is a South Korean film director and screenwriter. Lee wrote and directed his debut feature Like a Virgin (2006) (with director Lee Hae-jun), which won several awards for Best New Director and Best Screenplay. His first solo feature was Foxy Festival (2010). His third feature was a mystery film called The Silenced (2015).

== Personal life ==
Lee is openly gay.

== Filmography ==
=== As director ===
- Like a Virgin (2006)
- Foxy Festival (2010)
- The Silenced (2015)
- Believer (2018)
- Phantom (2023)
- Aema (2025)

=== As screenwriter ===
- Coming Out (short film, 2000)
- Conduct Zero (2002)
- Au Revoir, UFO (2004)
- Like a Virgin (2006)
- Foxy Festival (2010)
- 26 Years (2012)
- The Silenced (2015)
- Believer (2018)

=== For original idea ===
- Kick the Moon (2001)

=== As script editor ===
- Arahan (2004)

== Awards ==
- 2006 7th Busan Film Critics Awards: Best New Director (Like a Virgin)
- 2006 27th Blue Dragon Film Awards: Best New Director (Like a Virgin)
- 2006 27th Blue Dragon Film Awards: Best Screenplay (Like a Virgin)
- 2006 5th Korean Film Awards: Best New Director (Like a Virgin)
- 2007 43rd Baeksang Arts Awards: Best Screenplay (Like a Virgin)
