= Joh Keun-shik =

South Korean filmmaker (born 1968)

- Born: 1968 (age 57–58); South Korea
- Education: Seoul Institute of the Arts; Korean Academy of Film Arts
- Occupations: Film director screenwriter

Korean name
- Hangul: 조근식
- RR: Jo Geunsik
- MR: Cho Kŭnsik

Joh Keun-shik (Korean: 조근식; born 1968) is a South Korean film director and screenwriter. Joh debuted with Conduct Zero (2002), a creative and interesting comedy, as well as a box-office hit. His second feature Once in a Summer (2006), which displays his nostalgia and warm approach to directing, clinched Best Film, Best Director and Best Supporting Actor (for Oh Dal-su) at the 15th Chunsa Film Art Awards in 2007.

His latest film is the South Korean-Chinese romantic comedy My New Sassy Girl (2016), which is a sequel to My Sassy Girl (2001), also starred Cha Tae-hyun as the male lead.

== Personal life ==
A graduate from the film department of Seoul Institute of the Arts, Jo majored in directing at the Korean Academy of Film Arts.

== Filmography ==
- Seventeen (short film, 1997) - cinematographer
- Free To Fly (short film, 1997) - cinematographer
- Wan-Na-Be (short film, 1998) - director, editor, cinematographer
- Lies (2000) - assistant director
- Interview (2000) - actor
- Conduct Zero (2002) - director, writer
- Twentidentity (short film: "Secrets and Lies", 2004) - actor
- Once in a Summer (2006) - director, screenwriter
- Wish (2009) - directing department
- My New Sassy Girl (2016) - director

== Awards ==
- 2007 15th Chunsa Film Art Awards: Best Director (Once in a Summer)
