= Lee Sang-ah =

South Korean actress (born 1972)

- 이상아
- Lee at the 2017 Bucheon International Fantastic Film Festival
- Born: February 14, 1972 (age 54)
- Education: Seoul Institute of the Arts
- Occupation: Actress
- Years active: 1984–present
- Spouses: Kim Han-seok (m. 1997; div. 1998) Jeon Cheol (m. 2000; sep. 2001) unknown (m. 2003; div. 2016)
- Children: 1

Korean name
- Hangul: 이상아
- Hanja: 李尙雅
- RR: I Sanga
- MR: I Sanga

Lee Sang-ah (Korean: 이상아; born February 14, 1972) is a South Korean actress. She made her debut as a child in a 1984 KBS television drama and became one of the best-known teen stars of the late 1980s. Her films include Gilsotteum (1985), Like a Virgin (2006) and Scene (2024), and her television dramas include Love Tree (1987), Shaman (1994) and My Son-in-Law's Woman (2016).

== Early life and education ==
Lee was born on February 14, 1972. She was cast in her first television role the day after an audition at an acting academy. She later studied at the Seoul Institute of the Arts, where she graduated in February 1992.

== Career ==
=== 1984–1995: Child actress and teen star ===
Lee made her debut in April 1984 in the KBS1 drama TV Literature: Standing at a Mountain Temple, in which she played a child monk and shaved her head for the role. She made her film debut the following year as the young Hwa-young in Im Kwon-taek's Gilsotteum. Lee later said that during the filming, while she was still a minor, she was told to perform a full nude scene. When she refused, Im asked her whether she had money and told her that if she did, she should pay for all the film shot so far and leave, and she then performed the scene. In a 2023 article, TenAsia cited her experience as an example of the sexual exploitation of underage actors in the South Korean film industry. In 1986, she played Na-young in Great March of Tomboys, alongside Ha Hee-ra, and Sin-hye, a wealthy only daughter, in No Regret. She also appeared in the MBC drama Tiger Teacher while in her second year of middle school. In 1987, she played Su-jeong in the KBS1 drama Love Tree, a series that launched several teen stars and led its time slot in the ratings from 1987 to 1991. Her other films of the period include School Report (1987), I Will Give It All (1989), in which she played Hye-rim, and Coming-of-Age Ceremony (1990), in which she played Da-bi.

Lee was named with Lee Mi-yeon and Kim Hye-soo as one of the "troika" of teen stars of the 1980s. She was also called the "goddess" of the 1980s craze for photographs of stars printed on plastic writing pads. She appeared in many commercials and magazine pictorials, and she has said that she made well over 100 commercials, which included advertisements for computers, clothing, stationery and cameras. In a 2016 retrospective, the Lady Kyunghyang reporter Lee Yu-jin noted that Lee had relatively few acting roles in the late 1980s and no signature work, and suggested that the heavy commercial use of her teen image may have contributed.

In the early 1990s, Lee appeared in the dramas Perfect Love and Three-Day Promise. She was also active in films and commercials in 1991. She appeared in the dramas Walking All the Way to Heaven, Hot River and The Last Match in 1993 and 1994. She took the lead role in the 1994 KBS miniseries Shaman, which she described as a turning point toward deeper acting. In 1995, she appeared in the SBS drama Challenge and played So-young in the film Daddy Is a Bodyguard.

=== 1996–2015: Hiatus and return ===
Lee appeared in the drama How to Meet a Perfect Man in 1997. In 2001, she played Choi Young-hye in I Still Love You and appeared in Good for You, Sister-in-Law, and in 2002 she played Oh Hye-mi in Five Siblings. After about five years away from the public eye, during which she ran a bar, she returned in 2006 with a special appearance as the mother of the main character, Dong-gu, in the film Like a Virgin. It was her first film role in 11 years, and she said that she had hesitated before accepting the part of a mother. Lady Kyunghyang described her as having long been the subject of gossip and public criticism, and reported that she wanted to be known again as an actress.

In 2008, she played Seo Yoo-hee in the SBS morning drama Innocent You, which premiered on December 22 of that year. She played a daughter-in-law in "Mother's Island", a 2013 episode of KBS Drama Special, and Mi-ja in the 2015 film Speed.

=== 2016–present ===
In January 2016, Lee returned to television in the SBS drama My Son-in-Law's Woman, playing Jung Mi-ja. In the same year, she played Jung Hae-sun in Always Spring and Oh Deul-hee in the web series Investigator Alice 2. She played Choi Tae-ran in the 2017 drama Enemies from the Past. In January 2018, she appeared as Sung Joo-ran in the film Bittersweet Brew. In 2020, she played Jang Hye-sook in the drama Touch.

In April 2024, Lee appeared as Chairwoman Yoon in the occult horror film Scene, directed by Han Dong-seok and co-starring Kim Yoon-hye. The film had been shot about three years earlier, and she asked the director to time its release to the 40th anniversary of her acting debut. She bleached her own hair for the role instead of wearing a wig, and she received dermatological treatment for scalp irritation throughout filming.

=== Television presenting and reality programs ===
By 1991, Lee had hosted the music program Youth March for more than a year. In 2015, she appeared in the program What Is Mom. In February 2021, she joined the SBS reality program Burning Youth as a new cast member. In December 2023, the tvN Story program It's Alive! It's Alive featured her home in Icheon, which she shares with her mother and daughter.

== Personal life ==
Lee has been married and divorced three times. She married the broadcaster Kim Han-seok in 1997, and they divorced about a year later. In 2000, she married the singer and film producer Jeon Cheol, and they separated about a year later. Their daughter, Yoon Seo-jin, works as an influencer. Lee's third marriage, to a businessman, began in 2003 and ended in divorce in 2016. She runs a dog café.

== Filmography ==
=== Film ===
Year	Title	Role	Ref.
1985	Gilsotteum	Young Hwa-young	
1986	Great March of Tomboys	Na-young	
1986	No Regret	Sin-hye	
1987	School Report		
1987	Yalsugi's Age of Individuality	Kyung-a	
1987	Our Secret Diary		
1989	I Will Give It All	Hye-rim	
1990	Coming-of-Age Ceremony	Da-bi	
1992	Hyacinth in the Vines		
1995	Daddy Is a Bodyguard	So-young	
2006	Like a Virgin	Dong-gu's mother (special appearance)	
2015	Speed	Mi-ja	
2018	Bittersweet Brew	Sung Joo-ran	
2024	Scene	Chairwoman Yoon	

=== Television series ===
Year	Title	Role	Ref.
1984	TV Literature: Standing at a Mountain Temple	Child monk	
1986	Tiger Teacher		
1987	Love Tree	Su-jeong	
1990	Perfect Love		
1991	Three-Day Promise		
1993	Walking All the Way to Heaven		
1993	Hot River		
1994	The Last Match		
1994	Shaman	Lead role	
1995	Challenge		
1997	How to Meet a Perfect Man		
2001	I Still Love You	Choi Young-hye	
2001	Good for You, Sister-in-Law		
2002	Five Siblings	Oh Hye-mi	
2008	Innocent You	Seo Yoo-hee	
2013	KBS Drama Special: "Mother's Island"	Daughter-in-law	
2016	My Son-in-Law's Woman	Jung Mi-ja	
2016	Always Spring	Jung Hae-sun	
2016	Investigator Alice 2	Oh Deul-hee	
2017	Enemies from the Past	Choi Tae-ran	
2020	Touch	Jang Hye-sook	

=== Television shows ===
Year	Title	Notes/Ref.
1991	Youth March	Host
2015	What Is Mom	Cast member
2021	Burning Youth	Cast member
2023	It's Alive! It's Alive	Guest
