= 43rd Baeksang Arts Awards =

2007 South Korean award ceremony

- Date: April 25, 2007
- Site: National Theater of Korea, Seoul

Television coverage
- Network: SBS

The 43rd Baeksang Arts Awards ceremony took place on April 25, 2007, at the National Theater of Korea in Seoul. It was presented by IS Plus Corp. and broadcast on SBS.

== Nominations and winners ==
Complete list of nominees and winners:

(Winners denoted in bold)

=== Film ===
Grand Prize (Film)
**Tazza: The High Rollers**
Best Film	Best Director (Film)
**The Host**; I'm a Cyborg, But That's OK; Midnight Ballad for Ghost Theater; Radio Star; Tazza: The High Rollers	**Choi Dong-hoon** - **Tazza: The High Rollers**; Bae Chang-ho - Road; E J-yong - Dasepo Naughty Girls; Hong Sang-soo - Woman on the Beach; Kim Tae-yong - Family Ties
Best Actor (Film)	Best Actress (Film)
**Ryoo Seung-bum** - **Bloody Tie**; Byun Hee-bong - The Host; Jo In-sung - A Dirty Carnival; Cho Seung-woo - Tazza: The High Rollers; Gang Dong-won - Maundy Thursday	**Yum Jung-ah** - **The Old Garden**; Im Soo-jung - I'm a Cyborg, But That's OK; Jang Jin-young - Between Love and Hate; Kim Hye-soo - Tazza: The High Rollers; Na Moon-hee - Cruel Winter Blues
Best New Actor (Film)	Best New Actress (Film)
**Jung Ji-hoon** - **I'm a Cyborg, But That's OK**; Jin Goo - A Dirty Carnival; Lee Yeong-hoon - No Regret; On Joo-wan - The Peter Pan Formula; Ryu Deok-hwan - Like a Virgin	**Park Si-yeon** - **The Fox Family**; Choi Jung-yoon - Radio Star; Choo Ja-hyun - Bloody Tie; Go Ah-sung - The Host; Go Hyun-jung - Woman on the Beach
Best New Director (Film)	Best Screenplay (Film)
**Jeon Kye-soo** - **Midnight Ballad for Ghost Theater**; Cho Chang-ho - The Peter Pan Formula; Lee Hae-jun, Lee Hae-young - Like a Virgin; Lee Jeong-beom - Cruel Winter Blues; Son Jae-gon - My Scary Girl	**Lee Hae-jun, Lee Hae-young** - **Like a Virgin**; Kim Tae-yong, Sung Ki-young - Family Ties; Son Jae-gon - My Scary Girl; Won Shin-yun - A Bloody Aria; Yoo Ha - A Dirty Carnival
Most Popular - Actor (Film)	Most Popular - Actress (Film)
**Lee Joon-gi** - **Fly, Daddy, Fly**	**Kim Tae-hee** - **The Restless**

=== Television ===
Grand Prize (Television)
**Jumong**
Best Drama	Best Director (Television)
**Seoul 1945**; Alone in Love; Behind the White Tower; Hwang Jini; Jumong	**Ahn Pan-seok** - **Behind the White Tower**; Han Ji-seung - Alone in Love; Kim Chul-kyu - Hwang Jini; Lee Joo-hwan - Jumong; Yoon Chang-beom - Seoul 1945
Best Educational Program	Best Entertainment Program
**Urgent Deploy SOS 24**; Complaint Zero; Love in Asia; Knowledge Channel e; Special Project: The Yellow River	**Global Talk Show**; Infinite Challenge; Shin Dong-yup's Yes! No?; Space Empathy; Unstoppable High Kick!
Best Actor (Television)	Best Actress (Television)
**Kim Myung-min** - **Behind the White Tower**; Hyun Bin - The Snow Queen; Lee Beom-soo - Surgeon Bong Dal-hee; Ryu Soo-young - Seoul 1945; Song Il-gook - Jumong	**Son Ye-jin** - **Alone in Love**; Ha Ji-won - Hwang Jini; Han Hye-jin - Jumong; Han Ye-seul - Couple or Trouble; Park Jin-hee - Please Come Back, Soon-ae
Best New Actor (Television)	Best New Actress (Television)
**Park Hae-jin** - **Famous Chil Princesses**; Lee Min-ki - Love Truly; Lee Sun-kyun - Behind the White Tower; Oh Man-seok - The Vineyard Man; Park Gun-hyung - When Spring Comes	**Go Ara** - **Snow Flower**; Ku Hye-sun - Hearts of Nineteen; Lee Ha-na - Alone in Love; Park Si-yeon - When Spring Comes; Song Ji-hyo - Jumong
Best New Director (Television)	Best Screenplay (Television)
**Kim Hyung-shik** - **Surgeon Bong Dal-hee**; Kim Sang-ho - Couple or Trouble; Park Man-young - The Vineyard Man; Shin Yoon-sub - My Lovely Fool	**Jung Hyung-soo** - **Jumong**; Choi Soon-shik - Please Come Back, Soon-ae; Hong Jung-eun, Hong Mi-ran - Couple or Trouble; Lee Han-ho, Jung Sung-hee - Seoul 1945; Yoon Sun-joo - Hwang Jini
Best Variety Performer - Male	Best Variety Performer - Female
**Jeong Jong-cheol** - **Gag Concert**; Jeong Jun-ha - Infinite Challenge; Jo Won-seok - It's a Gag; Shin Dong-yup - Hey Hey Hey 2; Yoo Se-yoon - Gag Concert	**Kim Mi-ryeo** - **It's a Gag**; Hyun Young - Happy Sunday; Kang Yumi - Gag Concert; Kim Won-hee - Come to Play; Park Bodre - People Looking for a Laugh
Most Popular - Actor (Television)	Most Popular - Actress (Television)
**Lee Beom-soo** - **Surgeon Bong Dal-hee**	**Han Ye-seul** - **Couple or Trouble**
