= Conduct Zero =

2002 film by Joh Keun-shik

- Film poster
- Hangul: 품행제로
- Hanja: 品行제로
- RR: Pumhaengjero
- MR: P'umhaengjero
- Directed by: Joh Keun-shik
- Written by: Lee Hae-jun; Lee Hae-young
- Starring: Ryoo Seung-bum; Lim Eun-kyung; Gong Hyo-jin; Kim Kwang-il
- Cinematography: Jo Yong-gyu
- Edited by: Kim Sang-bum; Kim Jae-bum
- Music by: Lee Do-sa; Lee Ji-i
- Distributed by: Big Blue Film
- Release date: December 27, 2002
- Running time: 99 minutes
- Country: South Korea
- Language: Korean
- Box office: US$9,837,044

Conduct Zero (also known as No Manners) is a 2002 South Korean romantic comedy film directed by Joh Keun-shik. The film was released on December 27, 2002.

== Plot ==
Joong-pil is the undisputed "king" of his high school due to his fighting skills. His life as a delinquent is comfortable until he falls in love with Min-hee, a pretty girl from a neighbouring school, and is challenged by Sang-man, a tough new student. Min-hee also faces competition from Na-young, leader of the "Five Princesses Gang", who has a crush on Joong-pil.

== Cast ==
- Ryoo Seung-bum ... Joong-pil
- Lim Eun-kyung ... Min-hee
- Gong Hyo-jin ... Na-young
- Kim Kwang-il ... Sang-man
- Bong Tae-gyu ... Soo-dong
