= Strongest Chil Woo =

2008 South Korean television series

- Promotional poster
- Also known as: Chilwu the Mighty
- Hangul: 최강칠우
- Hanja: 最強七迂
- RR: Choegang Chilu
- MR: Ch'oegang Ch'iru
- Genre: Historical drama; Action
- Created by: Park Sang-yeon; Kim Young-hyun
- Written by: Baek Wun-cheol
- Directed by: Park Man-yeong
- Starring: Eric Mun; Koo Hye-sun; Yoo Ah-in; Lee Eon; Song Ha-yoon
- Country of origin: South Korea
- Original language: Korean
- No. of episodes: 20

Production
- Executive producers: Jung Sung-hyo; Kim Tae-won; Lee Dong-ik
- Producer: lee Jin-seo
- Cinematography: Kim Yong-su; Kim Jae-hwang; Park Seong
- Editors: Lee Dong-hyun; Kim Na-young
- Running time: Mondays and Tuesdays at 21:55
- Production companies: Olive 9; Future One

Original release
- Network: KBS2
- Release: 17 June – 19 August 2008

Strongest Chil Woo (Korean: 최강칠우), also known as Chilwu the Mighty, is a 2008 South Korean historical drama that aired on KBS2. The titular hero is similar to a Zorro during the Joseon period.

The drama served as the last project of actor Lee Eon, who died on August 21, 2008, in a motorcycle accident.

== Synopsis ==
The series starts by stating: "Rather than being a person born in chaotic times, better to be reborn as a dog in peaceful times. However, there are some people who are born as dogs in chaotic times. This is their story."

The series occurs during the reign (1623–1649) of King Injo, the 16th ruler of Joseon. Injo was the son of Prince Jeongwon, who himself was the 7th son of King Seonjo, the 14th ruler of Joseon with Royal Noble Consort In of the Suwon Kim clan. The 15th ruler, King Gwanghaegun, was the 3rd son of Seonjo with Gongbin of the Gimhae Kim clan and therefore the Injo's uncle. In 1623, Gwanghaegun was ousted of power by a political plot from the Western faction, that puts Injo on the throne. The turmoil of the civil war was thereafter increased by the Manchu invasions of 1627 and 1636.

Two events are the cornerstones of the series and are stepwise described during numerous flashbacks. Both of them were instigated by the conservative Western faction. One of them is the bloody extermination of the "Rising Sun Utopia" (Muryundang), occurring during the year of the Snake (Gisa year, 1629, Injo '6), and the other is the assassination of Crown Prince Sohyeon by his father in 1645 (Injo '22). The main action is situated circa 1648. While elements of these former plots are re-emerging from the past despite a series of murders, a group of mysterious assassins is avenging the sadness of the poor people.

=== Episodes ===
There are 20 episodes. The action is not linear, with many flash-backs.

1. A sister to avenge
2. The zealous murderer of his daughter-in-law
3. Random murders at Naksu Bridge
4. Manchu varlet takes a riding lesson
5. Last love song of a betrayed poetess
6. A thief behind an elephant at Inseong-gun
7. The murder of the Unggi's leader
8. Eight years ago
9. Fake maebungu, true rapists
10. Russian attack at Qing's border
11. A broken sword
12. Headbands from the past
13. Malaria
14. Encounter at Muryun Dang
15. Legacy of Crown Prince Sohyeon
16. The Secret Record disappears
17. Prince's son presentation
18. A cursed twist of fate
19. A treacherous king
20. Bad guys are dying, too

== Cast ==
=== Main cast ===
- Eric Mun as Chil-woo (칠우), sergeant at the Uigeumbu in Seoul
  - Choi Su-han as young Chil-woo
- Koo Hye-sun as Yun So-yun (윤소윤), government slave at Uigeumbu
  - Lee Han-na as young So-yun
- Yoo Ah-in as Heuk-san (흑산), adopted as Kim Hyuk (김혁) by Kim Ja-seon
  - Ku Bon-sung as young Heuk-san
- Jeon No-min as Min Seung-guk (민승국), historiographer of Ch'unch'ugwan
- Lee Eon as Jaja (자자), former bodyguard of Crown Prince Sohyeon
- Im Ha-ryong as Choi Nam-deuk (최남득), Chil-woo's adoptive father
- Song Ha-yoon (Note: Credited as Kim Byul.) as Yeon-du (연두)
- Jang Jun-yeong as Cheol-seok (철석)

=== Extended cast ===
- Kim Young-ok as Chil-woo's adoptive grandmother
- Choi Ran as Chil-woo's adoptive mother
- Im Hyuk as Chief State Councilor Kim Ja-seon (김자선)
- Choi Jung-woo as King Injo
- Song Yong-tae as Uigeumbu Commissioner
- Jeong Won-jung as Uigeumbu Captain
- Son Kwang-eob as Lieutenant at Uigeumbu
- Jeong Jin as Sergeant Sa (사 나장)
- Shin Seung-hwan as Sergeant Oh (오 나장)
- Park Jun-seo as Sergeant Jeong (정 나장)
- Nam Myung-ryul as Jin Mu-yang (진무양), birth father of Heuk-san
- Park Yong-gi as Heo Won-do (허원도)
- Park Bo-young as Woo-yeong (우영), Chil-woo's younger sister
- Kim Byeong-chan, as Butler Song (송 집사)
- Oh Ji-young as Han Do-yeong's mother
- Cha Jae-dol as Han Do-yeong (한도영)
- Kang Jae as Jo An-jung (조안중), Son of Jin Sang-gun
- Lee Ho-seong as Jinsang-gun (진상군)
- Han Ye-in as Seo Geum-ok (서금옥), daughter of the murdered night watchman
- Woo Hyun as Kim Mal-jung (김말중), interpreter
- Park Hyo-bin as Sam-wol (삼월)
- Ko Jeong-min as Ok-byong (옥봉), famous woman poet Seok Hyeong
- Kim Hong-pyo as Kim Jo-hyeon (김조현)
- Lee Ji-eun as Song Ju-hee (송주희)
- Jeon Yeong-bin as Mak-su (막수), leader of Heuk-san's militia
- Lee Seung-hyo as Boon-nyeo (분녀)
- Min Ah-ryeong as Min Eun-hee (민은희), Min Seung-guk's sister
- Kim Ju-yong as Yong Gol Dae (용골대), General of Qing
- Son Il-kwon as Lee Chi-seo (이치서)
- Kim Kyu-chul as Choe Won-sik (최원식)
- Nam Seong-jin as Jo Seong-du (조성두)
- Yang So-min as Crown Princess Minhoe (민회 황태자비) of the Gang clan, Wife of Crown Prince Sohyeon (소현 황태자)
- Lee Seung-hyung as spy Yusaeng (유생)
- Moon Won-joo as Villager
- Cha Soon-bae as Park Geom-yeol (박검열)

=== Cameos ===
- Nam Il-wu as Kim Hong-jo (김홍조), Woo-yeong's adoptive father (episode 1~3 & 13)
- Oh Man-seok as Kang San-ha (강산하), Chil-woo's birth father (episode 1)
- Kim Ji-seok as Petitioner (episode 1)
- Kang In-duk as boss Woong-gi (episode 7)
- Im Ho as Crown Prince Sohyeon (episode 13)

== Ratings ==
Date	Episode	Nationwide	Seoul
2008-06-17	1	11.5% (7th)	11.3% (8th)
2008-06-17	2	9.1% (14th)	8.9% (15th)
2008-06-23	3	10.5% (10th)	10.1% (12th)
2008-06-24	4	11.3% (9th)	10.6% (8th)
2008-06-30	5	9.9% (11th)	9.3% (11th)
2008-07-01	6	10.5% (9th)	10.2% (8th)
2008-07-07	7	9.4% (13th)	9.0% (14th)
2008-07-08	8	10.6% (9th)	10.5% (8th)
2008-07-14	9	10.5% (9th)	10.0% (8th)
2008-07-15	10	9.8% (9th)	9.4% (10th)
2008-07-21	11	9.5% (10th)	9.2% (11th)
2008-07-22	12	10.6% (8th)	10.0% (9th)
2008-07-28	13	9.4% (12th)	8.7% (13th)
2008-07-29	14	9.4% (10th)	8.9% (11th)
2008-08-04	15	9.2% (13th)	8.9% (15th)
2008-08-05	16	9.3% (11th)	9.0% (11th)
2008-08-11	17	9.9%	12.9%
2008-08-12	18	13.5% (17th)	14.0% (16th)
2008-08-18	19	10.9% (12th)	11.1% (13th)
2008-08-19	20	13.4% (7th)	13.4% (7th)
Average		10.4%	-

Source: TNS Media Korea
