= My Dictator =

- Theatrical release poster
- Directed by: Lee Hae-jun
- Written by: Lee Hae-jun; Baek Cheol-hyeon
- Produced by: Kim Moo-ryoung
- Starring: Sul Kyung-gu; Park Hae-il
- Cinematography: Kim Byeong-seo
- Edited by: Nam Na-yeong
- Music by: Lee Jin-hee; Kim Hong-jib
- Production company: banzakbanzak Film Production
- Distributed by: Lotte Entertainment
- Release date: October 30, 2014
- Running time: 127 minutes
- Country: South Korea
- Language: Korean
- Budget: US$3.64 million

My Dictator (Korean: 나의 독재자; RR: Naui dokjaeja) is a 2014 South Korean film directed and co-written by Lee Hae-jun, starring Sul Kyung-gu and Park Hae-il.

== Plot ==
After the North-South Korea Joint Statement on July 4, 1972, reunification fervor briefly sweeps over the Korean Peninsula. The Korean Central Intelligence Agency is forced to prepare for what could soon be the first inter-Korean summit and they are worried about South Korean president Park Chung Hee's meeting with the reclusive and potentially dangerous North Korean leader Kim Il Sung. They decide to stage an imaginary summit so that they can prepare Park for a variety of scenarios and outcomes. So the KCIA looks for an unknown (and bad) actor to play the body double for Kim Il Sung.

Kim Sung-geun earns his living doing odd jobs for a theater company, occasionally playing a walk-on part, and waiting for his big break. He gets cast in a small role as The Fool in Shakespeare's King Lear, but he forgets his lines due to stage fright. Sung-geun not only ruins the show, but he feels shamed in front of his son Tae-sik, who was in the audience and had believed his father to be the greatest actor in the world.

Backstage, the devastated Sung-geun is approached by Professor Heo, who praises his performance and tells him to show up at a "special audition." At the audition, Sung-geun is confused when the casting directors all seem to be government scientists, and even when his performance goes terribly, he is told that it's exactly what they were looking for. He and 11 other actors pass the first round, then they're put on a bus and taken to the basement of the KCIA building where they are stripped, dragged into separate rooms and tortured. Too dumb to lie to his interrogators, Sung-geun is the only one left and gets chosen for the job. For Sung-geun, this is the role of a lifetime, and he puts his heart and soul into the performance, determined to have his acting acknowledged and to impress his son.

But when the summit gets cancelled, Sung-geun cannot let go of his Kim Il Sung persona and continues to act like the North Korean leader. Frustrated at his father, the adult Tae-sik places Sung-geun in a nursing home and refuses to visit him for the next 20 years. But when Tae-sik gets in trouble with loan sharks in the 1990s, he is forced to reconnect with his estranged father, whose dilapidated home could solve his problem.

== Cast ==
=== Main characters ===
- Sul Kyung-gu as Kim Sung-geun
- Park Hae-il as Tae-sik
- Yoon Je-moon as KCIA section chief Oh
- Lee Byung-joon as Professor Heo
- Ryu Hye-young as Yeo-jung

=== Additional cast ===
- Lee Kyu-hyung as Cheol-ju
- Bae Sung-woo as President Baek
- Kim Dae-myung as Stage Actor
- Shin Cheol-jin as Village foreman
- Heo Joon-seok
- Lee Hyun-geol
- Jung In-gyeom
- Kim Chul-moo
- Chae Soo-bin
- Sung Yu-bin as Tae-sik (Middle school student)
- Kim Young-woong as Mart staff
- Park Ji-hwan as Chief Adviser

== Production ==
According to director Lee Hae-jun, "A few years ago, I came across an old photograph of my father and stared at it for a long time. In the picture, my father looked so young and strong. Is this really my father? He looked like a completely different person from the strict, somber, dictatorial dad I've known my entire life. I was suddenly curious to know what made my father the man he is now. I realized that, for one thing, he lived through a period filled with dictators, both in North and South Korea. The son never gets to see his father as a young man, but a father is only ever an old man to his children. It's a lonely fate, and he must blame and resent others for it. This film is a belated confession to my weak, frail, dictator of a father, and to fathers like him all over the world."

My Dictator was among the 32 films chosen by the Hong Kong Asian Film Financing Forum (HAF) in 2012. Financed by Lotte Entertainment with a budget of ₩4 billion, filming began at a small theater in Namwon, North Jeolla Province on March 26, 2014. The three-month shoot finished on July 8, 2014, in Changsin-dong, Seoul.

== Awards and nominations ==
Year	Award	Category	Recipient	Result
2014	22nd Korea Culture and Entertainment Awards	Grand Prize (Daesang) in Film	Sul Kyung-gu	Won
2014	35th Blue Dragon Film Awards	Best New Actress	Ryu Hye-young	Nominated
2014	35th Blue Dragon Film Awards	Technical Award	Song Jong-hee (special make-up)	Nominated
2014	1st Korean Film Producers Association Awards	Best Actor	Sul Kyung-gu	Won
2014	1st Korean Film Producers Association Awards	Best Screenplay	Lee Hae-jun, Baek Cheol-hyeon	Won
2015	10th Max Movie Awards	Best New Actress	Ryu Hye-young	Nominated
2015	51st Baeksang Arts Awards	Best Actor	Sul Kyung-gu	Nominated
