= Take Care of Us, Captain =

- Promotional poster
- Also known as: Please, Captain
- Genre: Romance; Drama
- Written by: Jung Na-myung
- Directed by: Joo Dong-min
- Starring: Koo Hye-sun; Ji Jin-hee
- Country of origin: South Korea
- Original language: Korean
- No. of episodes: 20

Production
- Running time: 70 minutes
- Production company: Story 365

Original release
- Network: SBS TV
- Release: January 4 – March 8, 2012

Take Care of Us, Captain (Korean: 부탁해요 캡틴; RR: Butakhaeyo kaeptin) is a 2012 South Korean television series starring Koo Hye-sun as a passionate female co-pilot who gets paired with the youngest pilot of a Boeing 747 (played by Ji Jin-hee). It aired on SBS TV from January 4 to March 8, 2012, on Wednesdays and Thursdays at 21:55 for 20 episodes.

== Synopsis ==
Kim Yoon-sung (Ji Jin-hee) is excited that he is flying as co-pilot with a legendary Captain Han Gyu-pil (Kim Chang-wan). One of the passengers on the plane is Han Da-jin's (Ku Hye-sun) pregnant mother. She is flying to San Francisco to attend Han Da-jin's graduation ceremony from a flight training school.

While the plane is making its way across the Pacific Ocean, the Captain leaves the cockpit to go to the restroom. Co-Pilot Kim Yoon-sung is left alone in the cockpit. When Kim Yoon-sung reaches for something, he accidentally hits a lever. This causes the autopilot to become disengaged. Kim Yoon-sung pulls on the yoke toward him and tries to get the airplane leveled. He manages to get the plane flying safely again.

Meanwhile, in the cabin, Da-jin's pregnant mother asks flight attendant Choi Ji-won (Yoo Sun), who is working her first flight, to take her to the restroom. At this time, a star passenger calls for flight attendant Choi Ji-won. Choi Ji-won turns around and attends to the star passenger. Da-jin's pregnant mother goes to the restroom alone. While Da-jin's mother is in the restroom, the airplane suddenly rolls heavily. Da-jin's mother bumps against the bathroom. She then collapses on the floor of the restroom. After the plane settles down, flight attendant Choi Jin-won becomes worried about the pregnant passenger and goes to the restroom to check on her. Choi Jin-won finds the passenger on the restroom floor. Flight attendant Choi Ji-won helps the woman back to her seat. Choi Ji-won covers the passenger with a blanket, but notices blood on her skirt. Choi Ji-won tells herself that the pregnant will be fine.

A little bit later, flight attendant Choi Ji-won goes back to the pregnant woman and this time finds her unconscious and covered with blood. Choi Ji-won is shocked and shouts for help. Other flight attendants move the pregnant woman to a camp bed. There are no doctors on board the flight. A baby girl is born on the camp bed. Flight attendant Choi Ji-won goes to get a pair of scissors and gives it to the head flight attendant. The chief flight attendant confirms with Choi Ji-won that she did indeed disinfect the scissors, takes her drawn out silence as confirmation and proceeds to cut the umbilical cord. Choi Ji-won is still in shock and froze, because she in fact did not disinfect the scissors. She can't do anything by this point, but just watch. After giving birth, the passenger becomes unconscious again and the bleeding does not stop.

The Captain hears of the situation and checks to see which airport they should make an emergency landing at. The nearest airport is in Anchorage, but the weather there would make the landing risky. Captain Han Gyu-pil tells co-pilot Yoon-sung that they should make an emergency landing at the original destination of San Francisco airport. Yoon-sung opposes the decision and asks him what if the pregnant woman was part of your family? Captain Han Gyu-pil replies that the pregnant woman is indeed his wife, but the collective lives of the 300 other passengers are outweighs that of his family member.

Han Da-jin's mother dies. The new born baby girl is in serious condition with sepsis. At the funeral for Da-jin's mother, flight attendant Choi Ji-won cries and co-pilot Yoon-sung cries from a distance. Later that night, a drunken Yoon-sung waits in front of Captain Han Gyu-pil's home. Captain Han Gyu-pil then takes a walk with him by the home's garden. Yoon-sung tells Captain Han Gyu-pil that he still can't understand his decision and that he does not want to fly anymore. Yoon-sung then leaves.

The next day, Han Da-jin asks her father Captain Han Gyu-pil what her mother meant to him. He also tells him that her mother was also his passenger.

On the way from his wife's grave, Captain Han Gyu-pil receives a text message from his daughter apologizing for what she said. Captain Han Gyu-pil pulls over his car to reply back to her, but a truck then hit's Han Gyu-pil's parked car. Captain Han Gyu-pil dies from the collision. Now, Han Da-jin is left alone with her sick younger baby sister. Co-pilot Yoon-sung leaves South Korea without knowing that Captain Han Gyu-pil died.

Seven years later, Han Da-jin is now a pilot. She is excited to hear that she will fly with well-regarded Captain Yoon-sung. On their first flight together, Han Da-jin makes some mistakes. Captain Yoon-sung believes that Han Da-jin is incapable of becoming a competent pilot, but Han Da-jin thinks otherwise.

== Cast ==
=== Main characters ===
- Ji Jin-hee as Kim Yoon-sung
- Koo Hye-sun as Han Da-jin
- Lee Chun-hee as Kang Dong-soo
- Yoo Sun as Choi Ji-won
- Clara Lee (Note: Credited as Lee Sung-min.) as Hong Mi-joo
  - Kim Ji-young as young Hong Mi-joo

=== Supporting characters ===
- Kal So-won as Han Da-yeon
- Im Seong-eon as Jang Min-ah
- Joo Sung-min as Heo Jae-soo
- Park Jae-rang as Jo Wan-joon
- Ha Joo-hee as Lee Joo-ri
- Kang Nam-gil as Choi Dal-ho
- Kim Jin-geun as flight director
- Sean Richard Dulake as James
- Kim Chang-wan as Han Gyu-pil
- Jung In-seo as Jung
- Lee Hwi-hyang as Yang Mi-hye
- Lee Saet-byul as Cha Geum-hee
- Lee Ah-hyun as Yang Mal-ja
- Jo Hyung-ki as Kang Pal-bong
- Choi Il-hwa as Hong In-tae
- Seo In-seok as Hong Myung-jin
- Park Eun-seok as Park Eun-seok
- Jung Gyu-woon (cameo)
- Kwon Nara (cameo)
- Lee Hwa-kyum (Note: Credited as Lee Yoo-young.) (cameo)
- Son Hyun-joo as Jang Dae-young
- Florian Juergens (cameo)

== Reception ==
According to AGB Nielsen Media Research, the third episode aired on 11 January recorded a nationwide rating of 9.4 percent in viewership, behind its rivals Moon Embracing the Sun on MBC at 23.2 percent; but ahead of Wild Romance on KBS at 6.4 percent.

== International broadcast ==
In Thailand aired on Channel 7 beginning 19 February 2016 on Mondays to Thursdays at 03:10.
