= Private Eye (film) =

- Theatrical poster
- Hangul: 그림자 살인
- Hanja: 그림자 殺人
- RR: Geurimja sarin
- MR: Kŭrimja sarin
- Directed by: Park Dae-min
- Written by: Park Dae-min; Lee Yeong-jong; Yoon Seon-hui
- Produced by: Lee Sang-yong; Han Seon-kyu
- Starring: Hwang Jung-min; Ryu Deok-hwan
- Cinematography: Choi Chan-min
- Edited by: Nam Na-yeong
- Music by: Hwang Sang-jun
- Production company: CJ Entertainment
- Distributed by: CJ Entertainment
- Release date: April 2, 2009
- Running time: 111 minutes
- Country: South Korea
- Languages: Korean; Japanese
- Box office: US$10.1 million

Private Eye (Korean: 그림자 살인; lit. 'Shadow Murder') is a 2009 South Korean neo-noir mystery thriller film directed by Park Dae-min.

== Plot ==
Seoul, 1910. Hong Jin-ho, Joseon's first detective, travels around solving trivial family disputes for pocket money as a private detective. However, he is determined to go to America someday and is saving up for the trip. Then one night, Gwang-soo, a medical physician in training, discovers a corpse in the woods and secretly takes it to practice dissecting. But the corpse turns out to be the son of Seoul's most powerful man. While planning to flee in the middle of the night and afraid of murder accusations, Gwang-soo meets Jin-ho, and asks him to find the killer. When another corpse turns up in the woods, murdered in the same way as the first victim, Jin-ho and Gwang-soo use a piece of cloth they find in the victim's mouth as the lead they need to bring them one step closer to the real killer.

== Cast ==
- Hwang Jung-min as Hong Jin-ho (private detective)
- Ryu Deok-hwan as Jang Gwang-soo (medical student)
- Uhm Ji-won as Soon-deok (inventor)
- Oh Dal-su as Oh Young-dal (police officer)
- Yoon Je-moon as Eok-kwan (circus master)
- Go Jun as Herb doctor
- Yoo Seung-mok

== Box office ==
According to its distributor CJ Entertainment, Private Eye attracted more than 554,000 viewers nationwide in the four days since its premiere on April 2, 2009, making it #1 at the South Korean box office. As of May 10, 2009, the total tickets sold domestically was 1,907,094.
