= My New Sassy Girl =

- Chinese poster
- Directed by: Joh Keun-shik
- Written by: Lee Dong-ha; Park Eun-kyung; Lee Jae-yun; Lee Ji-min
- Produced by: Park Geon-seop; Ryu Jong-ho
- Starring: Cha Tae-hyun; Victoria Song
- Cinematography: Kang Seung-gi
- Edited by: Park Kyoung-suk; Kim Chang-ju
- Music by: Kim Hyeong-seok
- Production companies: ShinCine Communications; Beijing Sky Wheel Media
- Distributed by: Little Big Pictures (South Korea)
- Release dates: April 22, 2016 (China); May 12, 2016 (South Korea)
- Running time: 99 minutes
- Countries: South Korea; China
- Languages: Korean; Mandarin
- Budget: CN¥32 million
- Box office: CN¥34.2 million

My New Sassy Girl (Korean: 엽기적인 그녀 2; RR: Yeopgijeogin geunyeo 2; Chinese: 我的新野蛮女友) is a 2016 South Korean-Chinese romantic comedy film directed by Joh Keun-shik, and starring Cha Tae-hyun and Victoria Song. This film, a sequel to My Sassy Girl (2001), was released in China on April 22, 2016 and released in South Korea on May 12, 2016.

== Plot ==
Gyun-woo is having difficulty forgetting The Girl of My Sassy Girl (2001) since she decides to leave him and take refuge as a Buddhist. He then reunites with his childhood sweetheart Sassy, an elementary school classmate from China who was often teased because of her broken Korean. They manage to get married despite an initial opposition from Gyun-woo's mother. Unbeknownst to Gyun-woo, his wife sends in his job application to a telecommunication company in China. Somehow he and another fellow Korean, Yong-sub, are recruited by the company and are assigned to Team Oxford, which they later found out is meant for recruits selected by the company Chairman's bull dog named Oxford. Sometime later Team Oxford is disbanded, his Korean colleague is fired and Gyun-woo is assigned to do degrading tasks for the company's Executive Director Kim. While trying to keep his wife happy, he does not let her know his employment status. But when his wife learns of it, she confronts the Executive Director at his home during a party, and things go out of hand as she kicks him into the swimming pool. As a result of the turn of events, Gyun-woo has to leave the company and his relationship with his wife is strained, forcing them to separate. As he is about to leave the company with his things, a female colleague whom he befriended, Yuko, tells him how his wife defended him in front of the Executive Director. After going home to find his wife not there and recalling the happy times they had together, he decides to go and find her. His tough journey through mountain trails in China is finally rewarded when he finds her on the plains with her grandfather and other villagers herding livestock on horseback. Both of them reconcile and later have children of their own. The movie ends with the family receiving a phone call from The Girl telling them that she is coming back to normal life and finding Gyun-woo.

== Cast ==
- Cha Tae-hyun as Gyun-woo
- Victoria Song as Sassy
- Bae Seong-woo as Yong-sub
- Mina Fujii as Yuko
- Choi Jin-ho as Executive Director Kim
- Song Ok-sook as Gyun-woo's mother

== Production ==
Budgeted at CN¥32 million, the film began principal photography on September 29, 2014.

== Boxoffice ==
Country	Released date	Boxoffice
China	2016-4-22	US$5.3 million
Korea	2016-5-12	US$479,605-$522,427
Singapore	2016-5-12	TBA
Malaysia	2016-5-19	TBA
Vietnam	2016-5-27	US$5.5 million
Philippines	2016-6-1	US$9.2 million
