= Au Revoir, UFO =

2004 film

- Film poster
- Hangul: 안녕! 유에프오
- Hanja: 安寧! 유에프오
- RR: Annyeong! yuepeuo
- MR: Annyŏng! yuep'ŭo
- Directed by: Kim Jin-min
- Written by: Kim Ji-hye; Lee Hae-jun; Lee Hae-young
- Produced by: Kim Jae-won
- Starring: Lee Beom-soo; Lee Eun-ju
- Cinematography: Lee Doo-man
- Edited by: Kim Hyeon
- Music by: Kim Tae-seong
- Distributed by: Tube Entertainment
- Release date: January 30, 2004
- Running time: 105 minutes
- Country: South Korea
- Language: Korean

Au Revoir, UFO (Korean: 안녕! 유에프오; RR: Annyeong! yuepeuo) is a 2004 South Korean film.

== Plot ==
Sang-hyeon is a bus driver who lives out his daydreams by recording his own "radio shows" for the people who ride his bus. He falls in love with Kyeong-woo, a blind woman who has moved into his neighborhood, but pretends to be someone else.

== Cast ==
- Lee Beom-soo as Sang-hyeon
- Lee Eun-ju as Kyeong-woo
- Bong Tae-gyu as Sang-gyu
- Byun Hee-bong as Real estate agent
- Jeon Jae-hyeong
- Go Seo-hee
- Kim Eung-soo as Landlord
- Kim Seon-hwa
- Seon Ji-hyeon as High school student
- Kim Young-jae as Jung-hoon
- Kim Hak-joon
- Jo Jae-yoon as Employee at last stop
