= Choi Il-hwa =

South Korean actor (born 1959)

- Born: May 9, 1959 (age 67); Gochang-gun, Jeollabuk-do, South Korea
- Education: Dongsan High School
- Occupation: Actor
- Years active: 1983–present
- Agent: Faith Entertainment

Korean name
- Hangul: 최일화
- Hanja: 崔日和
- RR: Choe Ilhwa
- MR: Ch'oe Irhwa

Choi Il-hwa (Korean: 최일화; born May 9, 1959) is a South Korean actor. He joined the Madang Sesil Theatre Group in 1983, and has since continued acting in Korean theater, television and film.

== Filmography ==
=== Film ===
- No Tomorrow (2016)
- Wonderful Nightmare (2015) (cameo)
- The Treacherous (2015)
- The Divine Move (2014)
- New World (2013)
- Man on the Edge (2013)
- The Peach Tree (2012)
- Fragments of Sweet Memories (short film, 2012)
- The Traffickers (2012)
- Deranged (2012)
- Two Weddings and a Funeral (2012)
- Helpless (2012)
- Perfect Game (2011)
- The Suicide Forecast (2011)
- The Showdown (2011)
- You (short film, 2010)
- Finding Mr. Destiny (2010) (cameo)
- Magic (2010)
- The Case of Itaewon Homicide (2009)
- Goodbye Mom (2009)
- My Dear Enemy (2008)
- My New Partner (2008)
- My Tutor Friend 2 (2007)
- The Show Must Go On (2007)
- Ad-lib Night (2006)
- Hanbando (2006)
- King and the Clown (2005)
- Typhoon (2005)
- When Spring Comes (2004)
- Someone Special (2004)
- Iron Mountain (2003)
- Where Has My Sooni Gone (2003)
- The Road Taken (2003)
- Wild Card (2003)
- KT (2002)
- Kiss Me Much (2001)
- The Uprising (1999)

=== Television series ===
- Two Cops (MBC, 2017)
- Tunnel (OCN, 2017)
- Night Light (MBC, 2016)
- Oh My Venus (KBS2, 2015)
- Save the Family (KBS1, 2015)
- The Jingbirok: A Memoir of Imjin War (KBS1, 2015)
- Enchanting Neighbor (SBS, 2015)
- Temptation (SBS, 2014)
- A New Leaf (MBC, 2014)
- Bride of the Century (TV Chosun, 2014)
- Inspiring Generation (KBS2, 2014)
- The Fugitive of Joseon (KBS2, 2013)
- Like a Fairytale (KBS2, 2013)
- Cheer Up, Mr. Kim! (KBS1, 2012)
- Dream of the Emperor (KBS1, 2012)
- The Moon and Stars for You (KBS1, 2012)
- Angel's Choice (MBC, 2012)
- Korean Peninsula (TV Chosun, 2012)
- Take Care of Us, Captain (SBS, 2012)
- Saving Mrs. Go Bong-shil (TV Chosun, 2011)
- Brain (KBS2, 2011)
- Deep Rooted Tree (SBS, 2011)
- Gwanggaeto, The Great Conqueror (KBS1, 2011)
- Poseidon (KBS2, 2011)
- Birdie Buddy (tvN, 2011)
- City Hunter (SBS, 2011)
- Dream High (KBS2, 2011)
- I Believe in Love (KBS2, 2011)
- Big Thing (SBS, 2010)
- Drama City: "I'm a Butterfly" (KBS2, 2010)
- Freedom Fighter, Lee Hoe-young (KBS1, 2010)
- Bread, Love and Dreams (KBS2, 2010)
- Cinderella's Stepsister (KBS2, 2010)
- Dong Yi (MBC, 2010) (cameo)
- The Reputable Family (KBS1, 2010)
- Son of Man (KBS1, 2009)
- City Hall (SBS, 2009)
- Belle (KBS1, 2007)
- In-soon Is Pretty (KBS2, 2007)
- Hometown Over the Hill (KBS1, 2007)
- Coffee Prince (MBC, 2007)
- H.I.T (MBC, 2007)
- Lovers (SBS, 2006)
- Wolf (MBC, 2006)
- Golden Apple (KBS2, 2005)
- Fashion 70s (SBS, 2005)
- Rustic Period (SBS, 2002)

=== Variety shows ===
- King of Mask Singer (MBC, 2017)

== Theater ==
- The Most Beautiful Goodbye in the World (2010)
- A Third-rate Actor (2004)
- Hwan (2004)
- Train to Seo-an (2003)
- Chujeok (The Pursuit) (2003)
- Goodfellas
- Silence of My Beloved
- Oedipus Rex
- Yun Dong-ju
- Kalman
- The Night of the Iguana
- Who Am I

== Controversy ==
On February 25, 2018, Choi admitted to being guilty of sexual harassment, and was subsequently removed from the MBC drama Hold Me Tight, as well as his position on the board of directors for the Korean Actors Association and academic advisor at Sejong University. However, on February 28, it was revealed later by an actress that he had actually committed sexual assault by raping her 25 years ago. Choi came under harsh criticism, as the possibility that Choi may have only confessed because he knew his name would be mentioned by the media was raised.

== Awards ==
- 2004 Beautiful Theatre Awards (selected by netizens on the portal site Gong-yeon): Highest Award in Theater Acting (The Pursuit)
- 2003 Actors' Association: Best Actor (The Pursuit)
- 2003 Dong-A Theatre Awards: Best Actor (The Pursuit)
