= Ryu Deok-hwan =

South Korean actor

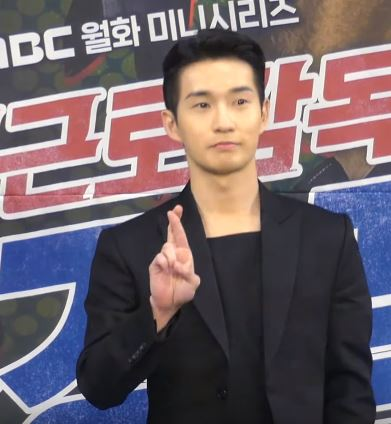
- Ryu in April 2019
- Born: June 12, 1987 (age 39); Anyang, Gyeonggi Province, South Korea
- Other name: Ryoo Duk-hwan
- Education: Chung-Ang University – Theater and Film
- Occupation: Actor
- Years active: 1992–present
- Agent: Andmarq
- Spouse: Jeon Su-rin (m. 2021)

Korean name
- Hangul: 류덕환
- RR: Ryu Deokhwan
- MR: Ryu Tŏkhwan
- Website: clownryu.com

Ryu Deok-hwan (Korean: 류덕환; born June 12, 1987) is a South Korean actor and director.

== Career ==
Ryu Deok-hwan began his career as a child actor on stage at age 6. Among his early TV drama appearances was a role on the popular Lifetime in the Country which he played for 8 years.

While he had played minor roles in several films, it was Ryu's breakout lead performance in Like a Virgin that earned him critical praise and industry recognition. He gained 28 kg in three months to play the role of a transgender teenager who joins the ssireum team.

Other notable roles include a high schooler desperate for a pair of Nikes in No Comment, a North Korean soldier in Welcome to Dongmakgol, a boy meeting his estranged father in My Son, a serial killer in Our Town, a medical student in Private Eye, a top neurosurgeon and forensic examiner in Quiz of God, and King Gongmin in Faith. He has also acted in the stage plays Equus, and Jang Jin's Clumsy People.

In 2012, he directed the short film Waiting for Jang Joon-hwan for the Olleh Smartphone Film Festival.

== Personal life ==
Ryu's mother is musical producer Jung Ok-young.

On August 26, 2020, Ryu announced in his fan cafe that he would be marrying his girlfriend of seven years, CEO and model Jeon Su-rin. In April 2021, Ryu announced that he would be holding a wedding with Jeon, after the wedding had been postponed from October 2020 due to COVID-19. It was a private event with only family members and close friends.

== Filmography ==
=== Film ===
==== As actor ====
Year	Title	Role
1999	Weathering the Storm	Pool boy
2000	Spooky School	
2002	My Beautiful Girl, Mari (animated)	Kim Nam-woo (voice)
2002	No Comment "My Nike"	Myung-jin
2004	My Little Bride	Dong-goo
2005	Welcome to Dongmakgol	Seo Taek-ki
2006	Like a Virgin	Oh Dong-ku
2007	Yobi, the Five Tailed Fox (animated)	Hwang Geum-ee (voice)
2007	My Son	Lee Joon-seok
2007	Our Town	Hyo-yi
2009	Private Eye	Gwang-soo
2010	The Quiz Show Scandal	Oh Cheol-joo
2011	Earth Rep Rolling Stars (animated)	Lucky (voice)
2011	The Last Blossom	Jung Jung-soo
2011	Head	Shin Hong-jae
2011	Link	Lee Jae-hyun
2012	The Peach Tree	Dong-hyun
2013	Nobody's Daughter Haewon	Dong-joo
2013	Behind the Camera	editor
2015	You Call It Passion	Cameraman Seo-jin
2016	The Last Ride	Go Hwan
2016	Hide and Never Seek	BJ Yagwang
2018	Default	

==== As director ====
Year	Title	Cast	Notes/Ref.
2012	Waiting for Jang Joon-hwan	Oh Jung-se; Park Shin-hye	Short film
2013	The Story of Man & Woman; Part 1: "Couple"; Part 2: "Friend"; Part 3: "Unrequited Love"; Part 4: "Sincerely"	Go Kyung-pyo; Kang Han-na	Short film
2022	Non-visit (All viewer +: Short Buster)	Lee Seok-hyung	TVING Short film

=== Television ===
Year	Title	Role	Ref.
1992	Ppo Ppo Ppo (Kiss Kiss Kiss)		
1996	Countryside Life	Soon-gil	
2000	Full of Sun		
2001	The Stepmother	young Heo Sang-wook	
2002	Five Siblings	young Han Jung-shik	
2003	MBC Best Theater: "Do You Love Me?"	Yoon Gyeong	
2004	People of the Water Flower Village	Jae-kyung	
2004	Sharp	Hwang Tae-min	
2008	U-Turn	Hwan	
2010–2019	Quiz of God	Han Jin-woo	
2012	Faith	King Gongmin	
2013	Good Doctor	adult Park Si-deok (cameo, episode 10)	
2015	I'm After You	Park Hee Tae	
2018	Ms. Hammurabi	Jung Bo-wang	
2019	Special Labor Inspector	Woo Do-ha	
2020	Nobody Knows	Lee Sun-woo	
2024	LTNS	Jung Gi-seok	
2025	Heavenly Ever After	Ko Eun-ho / Pastor	

=== Television shows ===
Year	Title	Role	Ref.
2021	Honeymoon Tavern	Guest	
2021	Country Diaries 2021	Lee Soon-Gil	

=== Music video appearances ===
Year	Song title	Artist
2009	"Sign"	Brown Eyed Girls
2011	"Index Finger"	Raspberry Field

== Theater ==
Year	Title	Role
1992	The Emperor's New Clothes	
2009–10	Equus	Alan Strang
2012	Clumsy People	Jang Deok-bae

== Discography ==
=== Soundtrack appearances ===
Year	Song title	Notes
2006	"Like a Virgin" (featuring Super Kidd)	Track from Like a Virgin OST
2011	"That Is You"	Track from Quiz of God Season 2 OST

== Awards and nominations ==
Year	Award	Category	Nominated work	Result
2005	4th Korean Film Awards	Best New Actor	Welcome to Dongmakgol	Nominated
2006	7th Busan Film Critics Awards	Best New Actor	Like a Virgin	Won
2006	27th Blue Dragon Film Awards	Best New Actor	Like a Virgin	Won
2006	5th Korean Film Awards	Best Actor	Like a Virgin	Nominated
2006	9th Director's Cut Awards	Best New Actor	Like a Virgin	Won
2007	4th Max Movie Awards	Best New Actor	Like a Virgin	Won
2007	43rd Baeksang Arts Awards	Best New Actor (Film)	Like a Virgin	Nominated
2007	11th Fantasia International Film Festival	Best Actor	Like a Virgin	Won
2007	44th Grand Bell Awards	Best New Actor	Like a Virgin	Won
2007	최고의 영화상 기자가 뽑은	Best New Actor	Like a Virgin	Won
2007	1st Korea Movie Star Awards	Best Young Star	Like a Virgin	Won
2007	1st Asia Pacific Screen Awards	Best Actor	Like a Virgin	Nominated
2011	7th Korea Drama Awards	Special Award for Cable TV	Quiz of God - Season 2	Nominated
2012	SBS Drama Awards	Special Acting Award, Actor in a Miniseries	Faith	Nominated
2020	SBS Drama Awards	Top Excellence Award, Actor in a Miniseries Genre/Action Drama	Nobody Knows	Nominated
