= List of awards and nominations received by Ryu Seung-ryong =

Ryu Seung-ryong awards and nominations
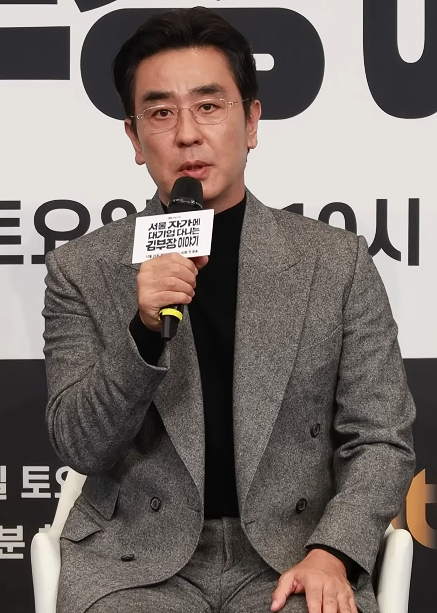
- Ryu in 2025
Awards and nominations
Award	Wins	Nominations
APAN Star Awards	1	1
Asia Contents Awards & Global OTT Awards	1	1
Baeksang Art Awards	2	7
Blue Dragon Film Awards	2	5
Blue Dragon Series Awards	1	1
Buil Film Awards	1	3
Chunsa Film Art Awards	0	1
Cine21 Film Awards	1	1
CJ ENM Visionary Awards	1	1
Director's Cut Awards	0	1
Dong-A.com's Pick	1	1
Golden Cinematography Awards	1	1
Grand Bell Awards	2	5
Korea Best Star Awards	1	1
KOFRA Film Awards	1	1
Korea Advertising Awards	1	1
Korean Advertisers Association Awards	1	1
Korean Association of Film Critics Awards	0	1
Korean Culture and Entertainment Awards	2	2
Korean Film Awards	0	1
Max Movie Awards	0	3
Mnet 20's Choice Awards	1	1
New York Asian Film Festival	1	1
SBS Drama Awards	0	1
Seoul Institute of the Arts	2	2
Seoul International Drama Awards	1	1
Star Night — Korea Top Star Awards	2	2

Totals (Note: Certain award groups do not simply award one winner. They acknowledge several different recipients, have runners-up, and have third place. Since this is a specific recognition and is different from losing an award, runner-up mentions are considered wins in this award tally. For simplification and to avoid errors, each award in this list has been presumed to have had a prior nomination.)
- Wins: 27
- Nominations: 48

Ryu Seung-ryong (Korean: 류승룡; born November 29, 1970) is a South Korean actor. For his performance in Miracle in Cell No. 7, Ryu won the Grand Prize in Film at 21st Korean Culture and Entertainment Awards. At the 49th Baeksang Arts Awards and The Dream Life of Mr. Kim, Grand Prize in Television At the 62nd Baeksang Arts Awards. he also received the Grand Prize for the same role. In addition to his Grand Prize win, Ryu has received four other nominations from the Baeksang Arts Awards throughout his career.

His further accolades in films include two Blue Dragon Film Awards, two Grand Bell Awards, a Buil Film Award, and a Golden Cinematography Award. In 2022, he received the Best from the East Award at the 21st New York Asian Film Festival for his role in Perhaps Love.

His contributions to the arts have been further recognized with the 2012 SAC Art Award from the Seoul Institute of the Arts, 2024 CJ ENM Visionary Awards and a Commendation from the Minister of Culture, Sports and Tourism at the Korean Popular Culture and Arts Awards.

== Awards and nominations ==
Sortable table of awards and nominations
Award	Year	Category	Nominated work	Result	Ref.
APAN Star Awards	2023	Top Excellence Award, Actor in a Miniseries	Moving	Won	
Asia Contents Awards & Global OTT Awards	2023	Best Lead Actor	Moving	Won	
Baeksang Arts Awards	2013	Grand Prize – Film	Miracle in Cell No. 7	Won	
Baeksang Arts Awards	2013	Best Actor – Film	Miracle in Cell No. 7	Nominated	
Baeksang Arts Awards	2013	Best Supporting Actor – Film	All About My Wife	Nominated	
Baeksang Arts Awards	2019	Best Actor – Film	Extreme Job	Nominated	
Baeksang Arts Awards	2024	Best Actor – Television	Moving	Nominated	
Baeksang Arts Awards	2026	Grand Prize – Television	The Dream Life of Mr. Kim	Won	
Baeksang Arts Awards	2026	Best Actor – Television	The Dream Life of Mr. Kim	Nominated	
Blue Dragon Film Awards	2010	Best Supporting Actor	Secret	Nominated	
Blue Dragon Film Awards	2011	Best Supporting Actor	War of the Arrows	Won	
Blue Dragon Film Awards	2012	Best Supporting Actor	All About My Wife	Won	
Blue Dragon Film Awards	2013	Best Actor	Miracle in Cell No. 7	Nominated	
Blue Dragon Film Awards	2019	Best Actor	Extreme Job	Nominated	
Blue Dragon Series Awards	2024	Best Actor	Moving	Nominated	
Buil Film Awards	2012	Best Supporting Actor	All About My Wife	Nominated	
Buil Film Awards	2013	Best Supporting Actor	Masquerade	Won	
Buil Film Awards	2019	Best Actor	Extreme Job	Nominated	
Chunsa Film Art Awards	2019	Best Actor	Extreme Job	Nominated	
Cine21 Film Awards	2025	Series Category – Actor of the Year	The Dream Life of Mr. Kim	Won	
CJ ENM Visionary Awards	2024	2024 Visionary	Ryu Seung-ryong	Won	
Director's Cut Awards	2019	Male Actor of the Year	Extreme Job	Nominated	
Dong-A.com's Pick	2023	"Moving" from "Cell No.7"	Ryu Seung-ryong	Won	
Golden Cinematography Awards	2022	Cinematographers' Choice Popularity Award	Perhaps Love	Won	
Grand Bell Awards	2012	Best Supporting Actor	Masquerade	Won	
Grand Bell Awards	2012	Best Supporting Actor	All About My Wife	Nominated	
Grand Bell Awards	2013	Best Actor	Miracle in Cell No. 7	Won	
Grand Bell Awards	2022	Best Actor	Life Is Beautiful	Nominated	
Grand Bell Awards	2023	Best Series Actor	Moving	Nominated	
Korea Best Star Awards	2012	Best Star of 2012	Ryu Seung-ryong	Won	
KOFRA Film Awards	2013	Best Supporting Actor	All About My Wife	Won	
Korea Advertising Awards	2014	Best Model Award	Ryu Seung-ryong	Won	
Korean Advertisers Association Awards	2013	Best Model Award	Ryu Seung-ryong	Won	
Korean Association of Film Critics Awards	2013	Best Actor	Miracle in Cell No. 7	Nominated	
Korean Culture and Entertainment Awards	2011	Top Excellence Award, Actor in a Film	War of the Arrows	Won	
Korean Culture and Entertainment Awards	2013	Grand Prize (Film)	Miracle in Cell No. 7	Won	
Korean Film Awards	2007	Best New Actor	Hwang Jin Yi	Nominated	
Max Movie Awards	2010	Best Supporting Actor	Secret	Nominated	
Max Movie Awards	2014	Best Actor	Miracle in Cell No. 7	Nominated	
Max Movie Awards	2015	Best Supporting Actor	The Admiral: Roaring Currents	Nominated	
Mnet 20's Choice Awards	2013	20's Movie Star – Male	Miracle in Cell No. 7	Won	
New York Asian Film Festival	2022	Best from the East Award	Perhaps Love	Won	
SBS Drama Awards	2008	Best Supporting Actor in a Drama Special	Painter of the Wind	Nominated	
Seoul Institute of the Arts	2012	SAC Art Award	Ryu Seung-ryong	Won	
Seoul Institute of the Arts	2026	Light of Life	Ryu Seung-ryong	Won	
Seoul International Drama Awards	2026	Best Actor	The Dream Life of Mr. Kim	Won	
Star Night — Korea Top Star Awards	2013	Top Star Actor	Miracle in Cell No. 7	Won	
Star Night — Korea Top Star Awards	2019	Top Star Actor	Extreme Job	Won	

== State honors ==
Name of country, year given, and name of honor
Country	Ceremony	Year	Honor or Award	Ref.
South Korea	Korean Popular Culture and Arts Awards (Note: Honors are given at the Korean Popular Culture and Arts Awards, arranged by the Korea Creative Content Agency and hosted by the Ministry of Culture, Sports and Tourism. They are awarded to those who have contributed to the arts and South Korea's pop culture.)	2012	Minister of Culture, Sports and Tourism Commendation	

== Listicles ==
Name of publisher, year listed, name of listicle, and placement
Publisher	Year	Listicle	Placement	Ref.
Forbes Korea	2013	Korea Power Celebrity 40	34th	
Gallup Korea	2014	Gallup Korea's Favorite Actor	6th	
Korean Film Council	2021	Korean Actors 200 (Note: Introduces 200 actors that best represent the present and future of Korean cinema to the people in the film industry all over the world.)	Included	
The Screen	2019	2009–2009 Top Box Office Powerhouse Actors in Korean Movies	4th	
