= Hey Sinamika =

2022 film directed by Brinda

Hey! Sinamika
- Theatrical release poster
- Directed by: Brinda
- Written by: Madhan Karky
- Story by: Pablo Solarz
- Based on: A Boyfriend for My Wife (2008)
- Produced by: Jio Studios; Global One Studios
- Starring: Dulquer Salmaan; Aditi Rao Hydari; Kajal Aggarwal
- Cinematography: Preetha Jayaraman
- Edited by: Radha Sridhar
- Music by: Govind Vasantha
- Production companies: Jio Studios; Global One Studios
- Distributed by: Viacom18 Studios; Phars Film Co
- Release date: 3 March 2022
- Running time: 148 minutes
- Country: India
- Language: Tamil
- Budget: ₹15 crore
- Box office: ₹5 crore

Hey! Sinamika (transl. Hey! Angry Belle) is a 2022 Indian Tamil-language romantic comedy film directed by Brinda, (in her directorial debut), and produced by Jio Studios and Global One Studios. It is an adaptation of the 2008 Argentine film A Boyfriend for My Wife, but has the roles switched. The film stars Dulquer Salmaan and Aditi Rao Hydari as a married couple, Kajal Aggarwal as a relationship counselor and Nakshathra Nagesh as a radio jockey. It follows Yaazhan, a software engineer, whose wife, Mouna, tries to end their marriage as she starts to find him annoying.

== Plot ==
In Kochi, Yaazhan, a software engineer, and Mouna, a paleotempestologist, fall head over heels in love with each other after meeting for the first time in a cafe and get married. After two years of marital life, Mouna becomes annoyed by Yaazhan's overly affectionate and talkative nature. She decides to separate from him to live a life of her own and on her own terms. She gets a transfer to Pondicherry so that she can have some me-time, but he lands there as well as he doesn't want her to miss him. Mouna recruits Dr. Malarvizhi, a relationship counsellor and Mouna's neighbour, who thinks all men are cheats because she was cheated on, and has facilitated the separation of many couples, as a final resort. The women's idea is to get Malarvizhi to make Yaazhan fall in love with her, so that Mouna can use that as an excuse to divorce him. However, Malar strikes a rapport with Yaazhan and the two form a close bond. Malar begins to fall in love with Yaazhan, and although he is unaware, he blossoms with his newfound career as an RJ and with his colleagues.

Tension arises between Yaazhan and Mouna when he discovers that she came to Pondicherry to get away from him. He then leaves for Chennai. Mouna realises she is losing Yaazhan and schemes to separate them, setting Malar up to be discovered by Yaazhan. Malar indirectly professes her love to Yaazhan, who is confused and troubled. Mouna tells Yaazhan the truth about their scheme. Yaazhan is devastated and leaves after telling Mouna that she gave up on him and doesn't deserve his love anymore. He starts divorce proceedings, leaving Mouna heartbroken. Malar is happy at first, as she thinks Yaazhan reciprocates her love. However, Yaazhan tells her that though he can't be with his wife, he does not see anyone else in her place. Yaazhan tells Malar that he believed she was truthful in her time with him and leaves a heartbroken Malarvizhi. Mouna learns about Yaazhan's conversation and realises how much she had hurt Malar, and apologises to her for involving her in the scheme and causing her heartbreak.

Six months later, Mouna and Yaazhan meet at family court, where he ignores her. Mouna asks Yaazhan about why he smiled the day he saw Malar sitting opposite him at the shop. Yaazhan tells her that he was thinking about Mouna the day he met her for the first time in a similar cafè, and didn't even realise it was Malar who was sitting across from him because he was thinking of Mouna. As Yaazhan starts walking away, Mouna realises how much he had loved her and she had tested him. She runs after him and begs for forgiveness, telling him how much she loves him, and the two reunite. Malar takes up Yaazhan's RJ job and decides to spend the rest of her life fixing troubled marriages through her new job. Yaazhan and Mouna end up happily with their daughter, Sinamika.

== Cast ==
- Dulquer Salmaan as Yaazhan "Yaazh" (later RJ Yaazhan)
- Aditi Rao Hydari as Mouna Yaazhan
- Kajal Aggarwal as Dr. Malarvizhi / RJ Malar
- Baby Sara as Sinamika - Yaazh and Mouna's daughter (Cameo)
- Nakshathra Nagesh as RJ Divya
- Yogi Babu as Paalmali Baba
- RJ Vijay as Ram
- VJ Kaushick Gabriell as Samanth
- Asiaville Abdulkalam
- Abishek Kumar as Shiva
- Soundariya Nanjundan as Paarvathy
- Shyam Prasad as Raja
- Pradeep K Vijayan as Kaundhi
- Sharmila Thapa as Sheeba
- Sangeetha V as Meenakshi
- Shakthi Rithvik as Aadhav

== Production ==
In January 2020, it was reported that Jio Studios had signed dance choreographer Brinda to make her directorial debut through a romantic comedy film featuring Dulquer Salmaan, Aditi Rao Hydari and Kajal Aggarwal in the lead roles. Titled Hey Sinamika, as inspired from a song from Mani Ratnam's O Kadhal Kanmani (2015), the film was launched at an event in Chennai during mid-March 2020. Madhan Karky was credited as the film's story, screenplay, dialogues and lyric writer, while Govind Vasantha and Preetha Jayaraman were announced as the film's music composer and cinematographer, respectively.

The shoot commenced in Chennai after the launch ceremony, with filmmakers K. Bhagyaraj and Mani Ratnam being guest directors for the first shot. Actresses Suhasini and Khushbu, close friends of Brinda, also participated in the first shot by handling the clapperboard. The film's shoot continued in Chennai with Salmaan and Hydari throughout March 2020 until it was stopped as a result of the COVID-19 pandemic in India. The shoot of the film recommenced in early November 2020, with Kajal Aggarwal joining the set after her wedding. The shoot of the film was completed in Chennai during late December 2020.

== Music ==
The songs of the film is composed by Govind Vasantha.

Hey! Sinamika

Soundtrack album by Govind Vasantha
- Released: 17 February 2022
- Recorded: 2021
- Genre: Feature film soundtrack
- Length: 3:46
- Language: Tamil
- Label: Sony Music South

Govind Vasantha chronology
Writer (2021)	Hey! Sinamika (2022)	Jo and Jo (2022)

Singles from Hey Sinamika
- 1. "Achamillai" Released: 14 January 2022; 2. "Thozhi" Released: 27 January 2022; 3. "Megham" Released: 10 February 2022

All tracks are written by Madhan Karky.

Tracklist
No.	Title	Singer(s)	Length
1.	"Achamillai"	Dulquer Salmaan	3:46
2.	"Thozhi"	Pradeep Kumar	5:05
3.	"Megham"	Govind Vasantha	4:01
4.	"Siragaai"	Keerthana Vaidyanathan, Sai Prabha	4:12
5.	"Yarissaikka"	Bombay Jayashri	5:13
6.	"Viduthalai"	Govind Vasantha, Prarthana Indrajith	2:52

== Release ==
Hey Sinamika was released in theatres on 3 March 2022. The film was originally planned to release on 12 February 2021 as Valentine's Day special, but was postponed due to ongoing COVID-19 Pandemic in India. The film was then scheduled to be released in July 2021 but was again delayed. The film was scheduled to release in December 2021 but was again postponed. Then the film was scheduled to release on 25 February 2022, but again got postponed for the same reason.

The film opened to positive reviews, but it couldn't perform up to the mark. The film released on 31 March 2022 on Netflix and JioCinema.

== Related ==
Year	Film	Language	Notes
2008	Un Novio Para Mi Mujer	Argentine	Original
2012	All About My Wife	Korean	Remake
2014	Un fidanzato per mia moglie	Italian	Remake
2016	Busco novio para mi mujer	Mexican Spanish	Remake
2017	Se busca novio… para mi mujer	Chilean Spanish	Remake
2018	Kế hoạch đổi chồng	Vietnamese	Remake
2022	Hey Sinamika	Tamil	Remake
2022	A Boyfriend for My Wife	Spanish	Remake

== Reception ==
Hey Sinamika was released in theatres on 3 March 2022. M Suganth, critic from Times of India gave 3 out of 5 stars and noted that "Hey Sinamika works better as a comedy than as a drama". The Hindu critic gave a mixed review, saying, "Dulquer Salmaan and Aditi Rao Hydari salvage this messy love triangle". A critic from Indian Express rated the movie 2 stars out of 5.

Sudhir Srinivasan from Cinema Express gave 3 out of 5 stars and said, "Invested performances lift this interesting, but flawed romance". Hindustan Times critic noted, "Hey Sinamika needed to be a breezy romantic comedy but what it ends up becoming is a problematic love triangle." P Ayyappadas from Onmanorama opined, "One of those films you really need to watch with your family."
