= List of highest-grossing films in South Korea =

The following are lists of the highest-grossing domestic films in South Korea by admissions and gross nationwide.

== Characteristics ==
Story-wise, films with more than 10 million admissions tend to have a single protagonist, emotional bond with the audience, multi-layered conflicts, a central idea, and familiar stories. They also reflect the social situation and history of Korea. Power of the distributor and marketing, social issues, and summer and winter vacation release also affect performance.

== Domestic films by admissions ==
This is listed by the tickets sold nationwide, as of April 12, 2026, according to the Korean Film Council (KOFIC). However, information on KOFIC was accrued since 2004, making some films that released before 2004 either not included or not accurate regarding number of admissions. Number of admissions for films that released before 2004 was collected from trusted articles or news.

Background shading indicates films are currently playing in theaters.

Rank	English title	Korean title	Director	Main Cast	Admissions	Year
1	The Admiral: Roaring Currents	명량	Kim Han-min	Choi Min-sik, Ryu Seung-ryong, Cho Jin-woong	17,616,661	2014
2	The King's Warden	왕과 사는 남자	Jang Hang-jun	Yoo Hae-jin, Park Ji-hoon, Yoo Ji-tae, Jeon Mi-do	16,918,111	2026
3	Extreme Job	극한직업	Lee Byeong-heon	Ryu Seung-ryong, Lee Hanee, Jin Seon-kyu, Lee Dong-hwi, Gong Myung	16,266,641	2019
4	Along With the Gods: The Two Worlds	신과함께-죄와 벌	Kim Yong-hwa	Ha Jung-woo, Cha Tae-hyun, Joo Ji-hoon, Kim Hyang-gi	14,414,658	2017
5	Ode to My Father	국제시장	Yoon Je-kyoon	Hwang Jung-min, Yunjin Kim, Oh Dal-su	14,265,007	2014
6	Veteran	베테랑	Ryoo Seung-wan	Hwang Jung-min, Yoo Ah-in, Yoo Hae-jin, Oh Dal-su	13,414,484	2015
7	12.12: The Day	서울의 봄	Kim Sung-su	Hwang Jung-min, Jung Woo-sung, Lee Sung-min, Park Hae-joon, Kim Sung-kyun	13,126,578	2023
8	The Host	괴물	Bong Joon-ho	Song Kang-ho, Park Hae-il, Bae Doona, Go Ah-sung	13,019,740	2006
9	The Thieves	도둑들	Choi Dong-hoon	Kim Yoon-seok, Kim Hye-soo, Lee Jung-jae, Jun Ji-hyun	12,984,701	2012
10	Miracle in Cell No. 7	7번방의 선물	Lee Hwan-kyung	Ryu Seung-ryong, Kal So-won, Park Shin-hye, Oh Dal-su	12,812,144	2013
11	Assassination	암살	Choi Dong-hoon	Jun Ji-hyun, Lee Jung-jae, Ha Jung-woo	12,706,855	2015
12	The Roundup	범죄도시 2	Lee Sang-yong	Ma Dong-seok, Son Suk-ku	12,693,322	2022
13	Masquerade	광해, 왕이 된 남자	Choo Chang-min	Lee Byung-hun, Ryu Seung-ryong, Han Hyo-joo	12,324,062	2012
14	King and the Clown	왕의 남자	Lee Joon-ik	Kam Woo-sung, Jung Jin-young, Lee Joon-gi	12,302,831	2005
15	Along with the Gods: The Last 49 Days	신과함께-인과 연	Kim Yong-hwa	Ha Jung-woo, Joo Ji-hoon, Kim Hyang-gi, Ma Dong-seok, Kim Dong-wook	12,278,010	2018
16	A Taxi Driver	택시운전사	Jang Hoon	Song Kang-ho, Thomas Kretschmann, Yoo Hae-jin, Ryu Jun-yeol	12,189,698	2017
17	Exhuma	파묘	Jang Jae-hyun	Choi Min-sik, Kim Go-eun, Yoo Hae-jin, Lee Do-hyun	11,914,798	2024
18	Taegukgi	태극기 휘날리며	Kang Je-gyu	Jang Dong-gun, Won Bin	11,746,135	2004
19	Train to Busan	부산행	Yeon Sang-ho	Gong Yoo, Jung Yu-mi, Ma Dong-seok, Kim Su-an	11,567,662	2016
20	The Roundup: Punishment	범죄도시4	Heo Myung-haeng	Ma Dong-seok, Kim Mu-yeol, Park Ji-hwan, Lee Dong-hwi	11,502,779	2024
21	The Attorney	변호인	Yang Woo-suk	Song Kang-ho, Kim Young-ae, Oh Dal-su, Yim Si-wan	11,375,223	2013
22	Tidal Wave	해운대	Yoon Je-kyoon	Sul Kyung-gu, Ha Ji-won, Park Joong-hoon, Uhm Jung-hwa	11,324,958	2009
23	Silmido	실미도	Kang Woo-suk	Sul Kyung-gu, Ahn Sung-ki, Jung Jae-young, Huh Joon-ho	11,074,000	2003
24	The Roundup: No Way Out	범죄도시3	Lee Sang-yong	Ma Dong-seok, Lee Joon-hyuk, Munetaka Aoki	10,681,998	2023
25	Parasite	기생충	Bong Joon-ho	Song Kang-ho, Lee Sun-kyun, Cho Yeo-jeong, Choi Woo-shik	10,316,367	2019
26	A Violent Prosecutor	검사외전	Lee Il-hyung	Hwang Jung-min, Kang Dong-won	9,707,581	2016
27	Exit	엑시트	Lee Sang-geun	Jo Jung-suk, Im Yoon-ah	9,428,172	2019
28	Snowpiercer	설국열차	Bong Joon-ho	Chris Evans, Song Kang-ho	9,353,799	2013
29	The Face Reader	관상	Han Jae-rim	Song Kang-ho, Lee Jung-jae, Kim Hye-soo, Jo Jung-suk	9,135,806	2013
30	Take Off	국가 대표	Kim Yong-hwa	Ha Jung-woo, Kim Dong-wook, Kim Ji-seok, Sung Dong-il	8,845,330	2009
31	The Pirates	해적: 바다로 간 산적	Lee Seok-hoon	Kim Nam-gil, Son Ye-jin	8,666,208	2014
32	Miss Granny	수상한 그녀	Hwang Dong-hyuk	Shim Eun-kyung, Na Moon-hee	8,660,651	2014
33	D-War	디 워	Shim Hyung-rae	Jason Behr, Amanda Brooks	8,426,973	2007
34	Ashfall	백두산	Lee Hae-jun, Kim Byeong-seo	Lee Byung-hun, Ha Jung-woo, Ma Dong-seok, Jeon Hye-jin, Suzy	8,252,909	2019
35	Scandal Makers	과속 스캔들	Kang Hyeong-cheol	Cha Tae-hyun, Park Bo-young, Wang Suk-hyun	8,245,523	2008
36	Friend	친구	Kwak Kyung-taek	Jang Dong-gun, Yu Oh-seong	8,134,500	2001
37	Welcome to Dongmakgol	웰컴 투 동막골	Park Kwang-hyun	Jung Jae-young, Shin Ha-kyun, Kang Hye-jung	8,008,622	2005
38	Confidential Assignment	공조	Kim Sung-hoon	Hyun Bin, Yoo Hae-jin, Kim Joo-hyuk	7,817,654	2017
39	The Himalayas	히말라야	Lee Seok-hoon	Hwang Jung-min, Jung Woo	7,759,761	2015
40	I, The Executioner	베테랑 2	Ryoo Seung-wan	Hwang Jung-min, Jung Hae-in	7,523,315	2024
41	The Age of Shadows	밀정	Kim Jee-woon	Song Kang-ho, Gong Yoo	7,500,457	2016
42	War of the Arrows	최종병기 활	Kim Han-min	Park Hae-il, Ryu Seung-ryong, Moon Chae-won, Kim Mu-yeol	7,482,180	2011
43	Sunny	써니	Kang Hyeong-cheol	Shim Eun-kyung, Kang So-ra, Yoo Ho-jeong, Jin Hee-kyung	7,453,393	2011
44	May 18	화려한 휴가	Kim Ji-hoon	Kim Sang-kyung, Ahn Sung-ki	7,307,993	2007
45	Hansan: Rising Dragon	한산: 용의 출현	Kim Han-min	Park Hae-il, Byun Yo-han, Ahn Sung-ki, Son Hyun-joo	7,264,572	2022
46	1987: When the Day Comes	1987	Jang Joon-hwan	Kim Yoon-seok, Ha Jung-woo, Yoo Hae-jin, Kim Tae-ri	7,232,452	2017
47	The Berlin File	베를린	Ryoo Seung-wan	Ha Jung-woo, Han Suk-kyu, Ryoo Seung-bum, Jun Ji-hyun	7,166,513	2013
48	Master	마스터	Cho Ui-seok	Lee Byung-hun, Kang Dong-won, Kim Woo-bin	7,150,586	2016
49	Inside Men	내부자들	Woo Min-ho	Lee Byung-hun, Cho Seung-woo, Baek Yoon-sik	7,126,925	2015
50	The Tunnel	터널	Kim Seong-hoon	Ha Jung-woo, Bae Doona, Oh Dal-su	7,120,780	2016
51	A Werewolf Boy	늑대 소년	Jo Sung-hee	Song Joong-ki, Park Bo-young	7,069,127	2012
52	Operation Chromite	인천상륙작전	John H. Lee	Lee Jung-jae, Lee Beom-soo, Liam Neeson, Jin Se-yeon	7,051,237	2016
53	Confidential Assignment 2: International	공조2: 인터내셔날	Lee Seok-hoon	Hyun Bin, Yoo Hae-jin, Im Yoon-ah, Daniel Henney, Jin Seon-kyu	6,982,840	2022
54	Luck Key	럭키	Lee Gae-byok	Yoo Hae-jin	6,975,631	2016
55	Secretly, Greatly	은밀하게 위대하게	Jang Cheol-soo	Kim Soo-hyun, Park Ki-woong, Lee Hyun-woo	6,963,821	2013
56	The Outlaws	범죄도시	Kang Yoon-sung	Ma Dong-seok, Yoon Kye-sang	6,880,546	2017
57	The Wailing	곡성	Na Hong-jin	Kwak Do-won, Hwang Jung-min, Chun Woo-hee	6,879,989	2016
58	Tazza: The High Rollers	타짜	Choi Dong-hoon	Cho Seung-woo, Kim Hye-soo, Kim Yoon-seok, Baek Yoon-sik	6,847,777	2006
59	The Good, the Bad, the Weird	좋은 놈, 나쁜 놈, 이상한 놈	Kim Jee-woon	Song Kang-ho, Lee Byung-hun, Jung Woo-sung	6,686,949	2008
60	200 Pounds Beauty	미녀는 괴로워	Kim Yong-hwa	Kim Ah-joong, Joo Jin-mo	6,619,498	2006
61	The Battleship Island	군함도	Ryoo Seung-wan	Hwang Jung-min, So Ji-sub, Song Joong-ki	6,592,151	2017
62	The Man from Nowhere	아저씨	Lee Jeong-beom	Won Bin, Kim Sae-ron	6,282,774	2010
63	The Throne	사도	Lee Joon-ik	Song Kang-ho, Yoo Ah-in	6,247,745	2015
64	Jeon Woo-chi: The Taoist Wizard	전우치	Choi Dong-hoon	Kang Dong-won, Kim Yoon-seok, Im Soo-jung	6,136,928	2009
65	My Boss, My Teacher	투사부일체	Kim Dong-won	Jung Joon-ho, Kim Sang-joong	6,105,431	2006
66	Northern Limit Line	연평해전	Kim Hak-soon	Kim Mu-yeol, Jin Goo, Lee Hyun-woo	6,045,199	2015
67	Colony	군체	Yeon Sang-ho	Jun Ji-hyun, Koo Kyo-hwan, Ji Chang-wook, Kim Shin-rok, Shin Hyun-been, Go Soo	5,952,656	2026
68	Joint Security Area	공동경비구역 JSA	Park Chan-wook	Song Kang-ho, Lee Byung-hun, Lee Young-ae	5,830,000	2000
69	Shiri	쉬리	Kang Je-gyu	Han Suk-kyu, Choi Min-sik, Song Kang-ho	5,820,000	1999
70	Midnight Runners	청년경찰	Jason Kim	Park Seo-joon, Kang Ha-neul	5,653,444	2017
71	My Daughter Is a Zombie	좀비딸	Pil Gam-sung	Jo Jung-suk, Choi Yu-ri, Lee Jung-eun	5,640,223	2025
72	Marrying the Mafia II	가문의 위기	Jeong Yong-ki	Shin Hyun-joon, Kim Won-hee	5,635,266	2005
73	Hide and Seek	숨바꼭질	Huh Jung	Son Hyun-joo, Moon Jeong-hee, Jeon Mi-seon	5,604,106	2013
74	The Last Princess	덕혜옹주	Hur Jin-ho	Son Ye-jin, Park Hae-il	5,599,995	2016
75	The Terror Live	더 테러 라이브	Kim Byung-woo	Ha Jung-woo	5,584,295	2013
76	Cold Eyes	감시자들	Cho Ui-seok	Sul Kyung-gu, Jung Woo-sung, Han Hyo-joo	5,509,019	2013
77	Secret Reunion	의형제	Jang Hoon	Song Kang-ho, Kang Dong-won	5,507,106	2010
78	The Priests	검은 사제들	Jang Jae-hyun	Kim Yoon-seok, Kang Dong-won	5,443,232	2015
79	The Great Battle	안시성	Kim Kwang-sik	Zo In-sung, Nam Joo-hyuk, Park Sung-woong	5,441,020	2018
80	The King	더 킹	Han Jae-rim	Zo In-sung, Jung Woo-sung, Bae Seong-woo, Ryu Jun-yeol	5,318,007	2017
81	Punch	완득이	Lee Han	Kim Yoon-seok, Yoo Ah-in	5,311,350	2011
82	Intimate Strangers	완벽한 타인	Lee Jae-kyoo	Yoo Hae-jin, Cho Jin-woong	5,294,154	2018
83	The Tower	타워	Kim Ji-hoon	Sul Kyung-gu, Son Ye-jin, Kim Sang-kyung	5,181,244	2012
84	My Wife Is a Gangster	조폭 마누라	Jo Jin-kyu	Shin Eun-kyung, Park Sang-myun	5,180,900	2001
85	Marathon	말아톤	Jeong Yoon-cheol	Cho Seung-woo, Kim Mi-sook	5,148,022	2005
86	Smugglers	밀수	Ryoo Seung-wan	Kim Hye-soo, Yum Jung-ah, Zo In-sung, Park Jeong-min	5,141,186	2023
87	Memories of Murder	살인의 추억	Bong Joon-ho	Song Kang-ho, Kim Sang-kyung	5,101,645	2003
88	The Chaser	추격자	Na Hong-jin	Kim Yoon-seok, Ha Jung-woo	5,071,619	2008
89	Believer	독전	Lee Hae-young	Cho Jin-woong, Ryu Jun-yeol, Kim Joo-hyuk	5,064,323	2018
90	Marrying the Mafia	가문의 영광	Jeong Heung-sun	Jung Joon-ho, Kim Jung-eun, Yoo Dong-geun	5,021,001	2002
91	The Spy Gone North	공작	Yoon Jong-bin	Hwang Jung-min, Lee Sung-min, Cho Jin-woong, Joo Ji-hoon	4,975,517	2018
92	Harbin	하얼빈	Woo Min-ho	Hyun Bin, Park Jeong-min	4,910,181	2024
93	The Grand Heist	바람과 함께 사라지다	Kim Joo-ho	Cha Tae-hyun	4,909,937	2012
94	My Sassy Girl	엽기적인 그녀	Kwak Jae-yong	Jun Ji-hyun, Cha Tae-hyun	4,852,845	2001
95	My Tutor Friend	동갑내기 과외하기	Kim Kyung-hyung	Kim Ha-neul, Kwon Sang-woo	4,809,871	2003
96	The Battle: Roar to Victory	봉오동 전투	Won Shin-yun	Yoo Hae-jin, Ryu Jun-yeol, Kazuki Kitamura	4,787,579	2019
97	Detective K: Secret of the Virtuous Widow	조선명탐정: 각시투구꽃의 비밀	Kim Sok-yun	Kim Myung-min, Han Ji-min, Oh Dal-su	4,786,259	2011
98	Kundo: Age of the Rampant	군도: 민란의 시대	Yoon Jong-bin	Ha Jung-woo, Kang Dong-won	4,775,811	2014
99	The Man Standing Next	남산의_부장들	Woo Min-ho	Lee Byung-hun, Lee Sung-min, Kwak Do-won	4,750,345	2020
100	Nameless Gangster: Rules of the Time	범죄와의 전쟁: 나쁜놈들 전성시대	Yoon Jong-bin	Choi Min-sik, Ha Jung-woo	4,720,172	2012

== Foreign films by admissions ==
Foreign films are listed by the tickets sold nationwide, as of December 9, 2022.

Background shading indicates films are currently playing in theaters.

Rank	English title	Title in Korean	Director	Admissions	Year
1	Avengers: Endgame	어벤져스: 엔드게임	Anthony Russo & Joe Russo	13,977,602	2019
2	Frozen 2	겨울왕국 2	Chris Buck & Jennifer Lee	13,747,792	2019
3	Avatar	아바타	James Cameron	13,351,368	2009
4	Aladdin	알라딘	Guy Ritchie	12,723,777	2019
5	Avengers: Infinity War	어벤져스: 인피니티 워	Anthony Russo & Joe Russo	11,233,176	2018
6	Avatar: The Way of Water	아바타: 물의 길	James Cameron	10,804,938	2022
7	Avengers: Age of Ultron	어벤져스: 에이지 오브 울트론	Joss Whedon	10,504,007	2015
8	Interstellar	인터스텔라	Christopher Nolan	10,326,240	2014
9	Frozen	겨울왕국	Chris Buck & Jennifer Lee	10,303,508	2014
10	Bohemian Rhapsody	보헤미안 랩소디	Bryan Singer	9,948,386	2018
11	Iron Man 3	아이언맨 3	Shane Black	9,001,679	2013
12	Captain America: Civil War	캡틴 아메리카: 시빌 워	Anthony Russo & Joe Russo	8,678,117	2016
13	Top Gun: Maverick	탑건: 매버릭	Joseph Kosinski	8,173,617	2022
14	Spider-Man: Far From Home	스파이더맨: 파 프롬 홈	Jon Watts	8,023,606	2019
15	Transformers: Dark of the Moon	트랜스포머 3	Michael Bay	7,785,189	2011
16	Mission: Impossible – Ghost Protocol	미션 임파서블: 고스트 프로토콜	Brad Bird	7,552,324	2011
17	Spider-Man: No Way Home	스파이더맨: 노 웨이 홈	Jon Watts	7,551,990	2021
18	Transformers	트랜스포머	Michael Bay	7,440,531	2007
19	Transformers: Revenge of the Fallen	트랜스포머: 패자의 역습	Michael Bay	7,437,602	2009
20	Spider-Man: Homecoming	스파이더맨: 홈커밍	Jon Watts	7,258,678	2017
21	The Avengers	어벤져스	Joss Whedon	7,087,068	2012
22	Mission: Impossible – Fallout	미션 임파서블: 폴아웃	Christopher McQuarrie	6,584,915	2018
23	The Dark Knight Rises	다크 나이트 라이즈	Christopher Nolan	6,428,574	2012
24	Kingsman: The Secret Service	킹스맨 : 시크릿 에이전트	Matthew Vaughn	6,129,681	2015
25	Mission: Impossible – Rogue Nation	미션 임파서블: 로그네이션	Christopher McQuarrie	6,126,488	2015
26	Inception	인셉션	Christopher Nolan	5,998,647	2010
27	The Lord of the Rings: The Return of the King	반지의 제왕: 왕의 귀환	Peter Jackson	5,960,137	2003
28	Les Misérables	레 미제라블	Tom Hooper	5,938,769	2012
29	Doctor Strange in the Multiverse of Madness	닥터 스트레인지: 대혼돈의 멀티버스	Sam Raimi	5,884,595	2022
30	Captain Marvel	캡틴 마블	Anna Boden and Ryan Fleck	5,802,810	2019
31	Mission: Impossible III	미션 임파서블 3	J. J. Abrams	5,740,789	2006
32	Jurassic World: Fallen Kingdom	쥬라기 월드: 폴른 킹덤	J. A. Bayona	5,661,128	2018
33	Jurassic World	쥬라기 월드	Colin Trevorrow	5,547,463	2015
34	Ant-Man and the Wasp	앤트맨과 와스프	Peyton Reed	5,448,134	2018
35	Doctor Strange	닥터 스트레인지	Scott Derrickson	5,447,269	2016
36	2012	2012	Roland Emmerich	5,431,440	2009
37	Black Panther	블랙 팬서	Ryan Coogler	5,399,327	2018
38	Transformers: Age of Extinction	트랜스포머: 사라진 시대	Michael Bay	5,295,836	2014
39	Joker	조커	Todd Phillips	5,255,308	2019
40	World War Z	월드 워 Z	Marc Forster	5,244,336	2013
41	Beauty and the Beast	미녀와 야수	Bill Condon	5,156,372	2017
42	The Lord of the Rings: The Two Towers	반지의 제왕: 두 개의 탑	Peter Jackson	5,145,193	2002
43	Kung Fu Panda 2	쿵푸팬더 2	Jennifer Yuh Nelson	5,064,796	2011
44	Aquaman	아쿠아맨	James Wan	5,041,187	2018
45	Inside Out	인사이드 아웃	Pete Docter	4,969,735	2015
46	Pirates of the Caribbean: At World's End	캐리비안의 해적: 세상의 끝에서	Gore Verbinski	4,966,571	2007
47	Kingsman: The Golden Circle	킹스맨: 골든 서클	Matthew Vaughn	4,945,484	2017
48	Spider-Man 3	스파이더맨 3	Sam Raimi	4,935,660	2007
49	The Martian	마션	Ridley Scott	4,887,144	2015
50	Thor: Ragnarok	토르: 라그나로크	Taika Waititi	4,858,572	2017

== Animated films by admissions ==
Rank	English title	Title in Korean	Admissions	Year	Country
1	Frozen II	겨울왕국 2	13,750,668	2019	United States
2	Frozen	겨울왕국	10,305,051	2013	United States
3	Inside Out 2	인사이드 아웃 2	8,799,611	2024	United States
4	Zootopia 2	주토피아 2	8,604,185	2025	United States
5	Elemental	엘리멘탈	7,238,453	2023	United States
6	Demon Slayer: Kimetsu no Yaiba – The Movie: Infinity Castle	귀멸의 칼날: 무한성편	5,686,958	2025	Japan
7	Suzume	스즈메의 문단속	5,542,245	2023	Japan
8	Kung Fu Panda 2	쿵푸팬더 2	5,064,796	2011	United States
9	Inside Out	인사이드 아웃	4,971,192	2015	United States
10	The Lion King	라이온 킹	4,743,295	2019	United States
11	Zootopia	주토피아	4,707,962	2016	United States
12	The First Slam Dunk	더 퍼스트 슬램덩크	4,702,083	2023	Japan
13	Kung Fu Panda	쿵푸팬더	4,650,000	2008	United States
14	Kung Fu Panda 3	쿵푸팬더 3	3,984,814	2016	United States
15	Your Name	너의 이름은	3,864,065	2016	Japan
16	Coco	코코	3,516,880	2017	United States
17	Chainsaw Man – The Movie: Reze Arc	극장판 체인소 맨: 레제편	3,427,755	2025	Japan
18	Toy Story 4	토이 스토리 4	3,400,623	2019	United States
19	Despicable Me 3	슈퍼배드 3	3,324,874	2017	United States
20	Shrek 2	슈렉 2	3,300,000	2004	United States

=== Korean domestic animated films ===
Rank	English title	Title in Korean	Admissions	Year
1	Leafie, A Hen into the Wild	마당을 나온 암탉	2,204,870	2011
2	Heartsping: Teenieping of Love	사랑의 하츄핑	1,232,364	2024
3	The Dino king: Speckles the Tarbosaurus 3D	점박이: 한반도의 공룡 3D	1,051,710	2012
4	Pororo, The Racing Adventure	뽀로로 극장판 슈퍼썰매 대모험	931,953	2013
5	The Haunted House: The Sky Ghost VS Jormungandr	신비아파트 극장판 하늘도깨비 대 요르문간드	894,826	2019
6	Hello Carbot: The Cretaceous Period	극장판 헬로카봇: 백악기 시대	880,776	2018
7	Pororo, Dinosaur Island Adventure	뽀로로 극장판 공룡섬 대모험	827,338	2017
8	Red Shoes and the Seven Dwarfs	레드슈즈	817,729	2019
9	Heartsping: Legend of the Whale Heartstone	사랑의 하츄핑: 고래보석의 전설	765,000	2026
10	Pororo: Treasure Island Adventure	뽀로로 극장판 보물섬 대모험	762,000	2019

== Domestic films by gross ==
This is a list of box office gross of domestic films in South Korea (adjusted for inflation) from 2004 to July 7, 2022, in South Korean won and US dollar according to the Korean Film Council.

Background shading indicates films are currently playing in theaters.

Rank	Title	Genre	Number of Screens	Distributor	Gross (₩)	Gross ($)	Year
1	The King's Warden	Historical drama film	2,262	Showbox	153,156,177,222	101,412,485	2026
2	Extreme Job	Action comedy film	2,003	CJ Entertainment	139,616,194,600	118,689,919	2019
3	The Admiral: Roaring Currents	Historical war film	1,587	CJ Entertainment	135,754,920,310	121,480,913	2014
4	The Roundup	Crime action film	2,521	ABO Entertainment	129,279,608,240	99,506,310	2022
5	12.12: The Day	Historical action drama	2,463	Megabox Plus M	119,139,145,117	90,911,213	2023
6	Along With the Gods: The Two Worlds	Fantasy drama film	1,912	Lotte Entertainment	115,706,188,137	103,540,502	2017
7	Exhuma	Supernatural horror	2,367	Showbox	114,768,824,260	83,128,633	2024
8	Ode to My Father	Drama film	1,044	CJ Entertainment	110,937,282,730	99,272,736	2014
9	The Roundup: Punishment	Crime action film	2,980	ABO Entertainment	110,032,719,817	79,337,169	2024
10	Veteran	Action crime comedy	1,115	CJ Entertainment	105,169,264,250	94,111,198	2015
11	Along with the Gods: The Last 49 Days	Fantasy drama film	2,235	Lotte Entertainment	102,659,157,909	91,861,637	2018
12	Assassination	Espionage action film	1,519	Showbox	98,467,187,781	88,113,815	2015
13	A Taxi Driver	Drama film	1,906	Showbox	95,868,830,649	85,789,845	2017
14	The Thieves	Heist film	1,091	Showbox	93,667,250,500	83,818,569	2012
15	Train to Busan	Zombie apocalypse thriller	1,788	Next Entertainment World	93,182,579,048	83,384,858	2016
16	Miracle in Cell No. 7	Comedy drama film	866	Next Entertainment World	91,433,282,670	81,819,492	2013
17	Masquerade	Historical drama film	1,001	CJ Entertainment	88,909,157,769	79,560,973	2012
18	Parasite	Comedy crime drama thriller film	1,948	CJ Entertainment	87,460,503,095	79,799,729	2019
19	The Attorney	Courtroom drama film	925	Next Entertainment World	82,872,378,800	74,158,728	2013
20	Tidal Wave	Disaster film	764	CJ Entertainment	81,025,841,000	72,506,345	2009
21	Exit	Action comedy film	1,660	Filmmaker R & K	79,234,922,162	72,294,637	2019
22	A Violent Prosecutor	Crime film	1,812	Showbox	77,320,403,264	69,190,517	2016
23	Inside Men	Political crime drama	1,129	Showbox	73,578,935,864	65,842,529	2015
24	Snowpiercer	Science fiction film	1,128	CJ Entertainment	67,012,370,200	59,966,401	2013
25	The Host	Monster film	647	Showbox	66,716,104,300	59,701,285	2006
26	The Pirates	Period adventure film	910	Lotte Entertainment	66,372,140,706	59,393,415	2014
27	King and the Clown	Historical drama	313	CJ Entertainment	66,015,436,600	59,074,290	2005
28	The Face Reader	Historical drama	1,240	Showbox	66,009,791,500	59,069,196	2013
29	Confidential Assignment	Action film	1,392	CJ Entertainment	63,783,051,326	57,076,809	2017
30	Miss Granny	Comedy drama film	1,027	CJ Entertainment	62,714,008,819	56,121,653	2014
31	The Age of Shadows	Action spy film	1,444	Warner Bros	61,270,079,831	54,827,812	2016
32	The Himalayas	Drama film	1,095	CJ Entertainment	60,175,363,015	53,848,200	2015
33	1987: When the Day Comes	Drama film	1,299	CJ Entertainment	58,166,910,145	52,051,008	2017
34	Master	Crime action film	1,501	CJ Entertainment	58,068,236,865	51,947,863	2016
35	Take Off	Drama action comedy	570	Showbox	57,570,773,000	51,517,470	2009
36	Tunnel	Survival drama film	1,105	Showbox	57,530,028,417	51,481,010	2016
37	Luck Key	Comedy film	1,234	Showbox	56,445,023,256	50,510,088	2016
38	The Outlaws	Crime action film	1,315	Megabox Plus M	56,322,098,349	50,400,137	2017
39	The Wailing	Horror film	1,485	20th Century Fox	55,864,308,382	49,990,433	2016
40	War of the Arrows	Period action film	615	Lotte Entertainment	55,827,861,500	49,957,818	2011
41	Operation Chromite	War drama film	1,049	CJ Entertainment	55,105,606,303	49,311,505	2016
42	Sunny	Comedy drama film	546	CJ Entertainment	54,037,760,700	48,356,631	2011
43	Scandal Makers	Comedy film	408	Lotte Entertainment	53,801,341,400	48,144,377	2008
44	The Berlin File	Spy thriller film	894	CJ Entertainment	52,537,006,637	46,852,013	2013
45	The Battleship Island	Action drama film	2,027	CJ Entertainment	50,510,565,168	45,166,848	2017
46	D-War	Fantasy action film	622	Showbox	49,340,084,700	44,152,201	2007
47	The Throne	Historical period drama	1,210	Showbox	48,845,771,500	43,710,108	2015
48	Secretly, Greatly	Action comedy film	1,341	Showbox	48,700,887,413	43,580,212	2013
49	The Man from Nowhere	Action thriller film	501	CJ Entertainment	47,103,592,500	42,151,283	2010
50	A Werewolf Boy	Fantasy romance film	854	CJ Entertainment	46,594,767,400	41,695,583	2012

== Highest grossing films by year ==
The highest grossing films of each year, annually.

Background shading indicates film is currently the highest-grossing film of that year.

Year	English title	Title in Korean	Distributor
1990	Ghost	사랑과 영혼	United International Pictures
1991	Terminator 2: Judgement Day	터미네이터 2	
1992	Basic Instinct	원초적 본능	
1993	Cliffhanger		
1994	The Lion King	라이온 킹	Buena Vista International
1995	Die Hard with a Vengeance	다이하드 3	20th Century Fox
1996	Independence Day	인디펜던스 데이	20th Century Fox
1997	The Lost World: Jurassic Park	쥬라기 공원 2: 잃어버린 세계	United International Pictures
1998	Titanic	타이타닉	20th Century Fox
1999	Shiri	쉬리	Samsung Entertainment
2002	Marrying the Mafia	가문의 영광	Cinema Service
2003	My Tutor Friend	동갑내기 과외하기	CJ Entertainment
2004	No data		
2005	Welcome to Dongmakgol	웰컴 투 동막골	Showbox
2006	The King and the Clown	왕의 남자	Cinema Service
2007	Transformers		CJ Entertainment
2008	The Good, the Bad, and the Weird	좋은 놈, 나쁜 놈, 이상한 놈	CJ Entertainment
2009	Tidal Wave	해운대	CJ Entertainment
2010	Avatar		20th Century Fox
2011	Transformers: Dark of the Moon		CJ Entertainment
2012	Masquerade	광해, 왕이 된 남자	CJ Entertainment
2013	Miracle in Cell No. 7	7번방의 선물	Next Entertainment World
2014	The Admiral: Roaring Currents	명량	CJ Entertainment
2015	Veteran	베테랑	CJ Entertainment
2016	Train to Busan	부산행	Next Entertainment World
2017	A Taxi Driver	택시운전사	Showbox
2018	Avengers: Infinity War		Walt Disney Studios Motion Pictures
2019	Extreme Job	극한직업	CJ Entertainment
2020	The Man Standing Next	남산의 부장들	Hive Media Corp.
2021	Spider-Man: No Way Home		Sony Pictures Releasing
2022	The Roundup	범죄도시2	ABO Entertainment, Megabox
2023	12.12: The Day	서울의 봄	Megabox
2024	Exhuma	파묘	Showbox
2025	My Daughter is a Zombie	좀비딸	Next Entertainment World
2026	The King's Warden	왕과 사는 남자	Showbox
