= Ryu Seung-ryong =

South Korean actor

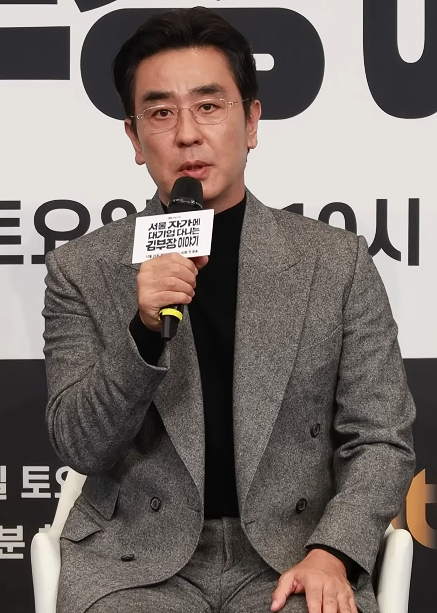
- Ryu in October 2025
- Born: November 29, 1970 (age 55); Seoul, South Korea
- Other name: Ryoo Seung-yong
- Education: Seoul Institute of the Arts (Theatre)
- Occupations: Actor; professor
- Years active: 1985–present
- Agent: Prain TPC
- Spouse: Undisclosed (m. 2004)
- Children: 2
- Awards: Full list

Korean name
- Hangul: 류승룡
- Hanja: 柳承龍
- RR: Ryu Seungryong
- MR: Ryu Sŭngnyong

Ryu Seung-ryong (Korean: 류승룡; born November 29, 1970) is a South Korean actor. Ryu began his acting career in theater, subsequently becoming one of the most versatile supporting actors in Korean film and television. He gained recognition by starring in the films War of the Arrows (2011), All About My Wife (2012), Masquerade (2012), Miracle in Cell No. 7 (2013), and The Admiral: Roaring Currents (2014), with the latter being the highest-grossing film in South Korea. For his performance in Miracle in Cell No. 7, Ryu won the Grand Prize at the 49th Baeksang Arts Awards. In 2019, he headlined the comedy film Extreme Job, which is currently the second highest-grossing film of all time in South Korea. Ryu is the first Korean to star in four movies that have drawn over 10 million viewers each.

In television, his notable works include Painter of the Wind (2008), Personal Taste (2010), Kingdom (2019–2020), and Moving (2023). He is currently an adjunct professor in the department of acting arts at Seoul Arts College.

== Early life and education ==
Ryu Seung-ryong was born on November 29, 1970 in Seoul and spent part of his childhood in his father's hometown at Seocheon County, South Chungcheong Province. He developed an interest in acting after watching a production of Faust, starring Kim Jin-tae, during his third year of middle school. Despite financial difficulties, his parents supported this interest by taking him to several stage performances annually.

While attending Pungsaeng High School, Ryu experienced bullying attributed to his rebellious nature. He found solace in the school's drama club, where his participation solidified his ambition to become an actor. In 1986, he made his debut in a musical. He also remained academically successful, serving as class president and ranking third in his class and consistently placing in the top 50 students in the school.

In 1990, Ryu enrolled in the Theatre Department at the Seoul Institute of the Arts. His fellow 1990 batch were Ahn Jae-wook and Lee Hae-young. For his graduation project, he played the lead in the play Road, directed by Professor Kang Man-hong, known for the avant-garde production "Kka." The production also featured his classmates Hwang Jung-min, Jung Jae-young, Im Won-hee, and Jang Jin, who was one year his senior in college. Ryu subsequently earned a bachelor's degree in Theatre.

== Career ==
=== 1998–2003: Beginning in theater and Nanta ===
After graduating, Ryu joined the Dongrang Theater Company and performed in several large-scale musicals in a small roles. To support himself and gain life experience, Ryu took on various part-time jobs, including interior decorating, delivering food, carrying cabbage at Garak Market, and washing cars. Notably, he developed a unique venture on Jeju Island where he charged 30,000 won to take Polaroid photos of newlyweds flying paper kites with their wishes, a method that sometimes earned him approximately three million won per day. He also worked part-time at a bidet assembly factory in Jocheon alongside fellow actor Yoo Hae-jin.

A turning point in Ryu's career occurred in 1997 in New York, where he and Yoo Hae-jin performed the avant-garde play Duta (The Road to Gudo) at the La MaMa Experimental Theatre Club in New York. While there, he observed groundbreaking happening shows like Stomp, Blue Man Group, and Tube. These performances inspired him to question the prevailing didactic nature of Korean plays and the lack of similar non-verbal shows.

Ryu found his answer in October 1997, when he attended the premiere of the non-verbal performance Nanta at Hoam Art Hall, produced by PMC Production. Impressed by the show, he auditioned and became a substitute member, eventually joining as a core cast member in 1998. He worked closely with founding members Kim Moon-soo and Kim Won-hae, and later Jang Hyuk-jin, forming the ensemble that practiced and performed Nanta worldwide. The show quickly gained immense popularity, setting the record for the longest-running open run performance in Korea.

Following its participation in the 1999 Edinburgh Festival Fringe, Nanta embarked on a global tour across over 20 countries, including Japan, Europe, Australia, and North America, maintaining an audience occupancy rate of over 90%. It became a major cultural draw, attracting 70% of foreign tourists to Korea. Nanta was also the first Korean performance to utilize the concept of a dedicated theater, opening locations in Jeong-dong (2000) and Cheongdam-dong (2002). By 2003, PMC was operating seven theaters. The production made its New York debut in 2002, with a performance on Broadway and an appearance on NBC's Today Show, predating other major Korean acts like Psy. Ryu's dedication to Nanta lasted five years. He later reflected on this period, stating: "I had dreams of performing on Broadway. Nanta is a top-tier show... I eventually left because I felt like a mute without any lines."

After leaving in 2002, Ryu focused on roles requiring dialogue and reunited with director Jang Jin, having previously declined a script for Jang's play Heotang due to his Nanta commitments. They successfully collaborated on the play Welcome to Dongmakgol, performed at the LG Arts Center in December 2002. Although Ryu felt he had only regained about 70% of his original linguistic sensitivity after the performance, his acting skills were clearly evident.

=== 2004–2018: Screen debut and rise as Jang Jin's muses ===
Ryu made his film debut in a small role in Jang Jin's film Someone Special (2004) as a bank robber. He quickly followed this by acting in Jang Jin's environmental short film, Has the Rain Stopped?. In this short, he appeared as a slow-speaking, sagging-bellied farmer from Jeolla province. He delivered a reliable performance as a father who, though disdainful of his son's first love, still embraced him. In 2005, he appeared as a rival prosecutor, Seong-jun, a colleague of Choi Yoon-gi (Cha Seung-won) in Jang Jin's feature film, Murder, Take One (2005). Although he did not have an entirely independent scene, his low voice and smooth manner of speaking left a distinct impression.

His potential as a mature actor was further showcased in another Jang Jin short film, Someone Grateful, which screened at the 2005 Jeonju Film Festival. He played a contractual torture technician, effectively portraying a middle-aged worker permeated with fatigue who was unable to receive proper overtime pay despite working overnight shifts. His acting potential was noted in this, his third film collaboration with director Jang Jin. In September 2005, his work with the director extended to the stage as he rehearsed for Jang Jin's play, Death of a Salesman.

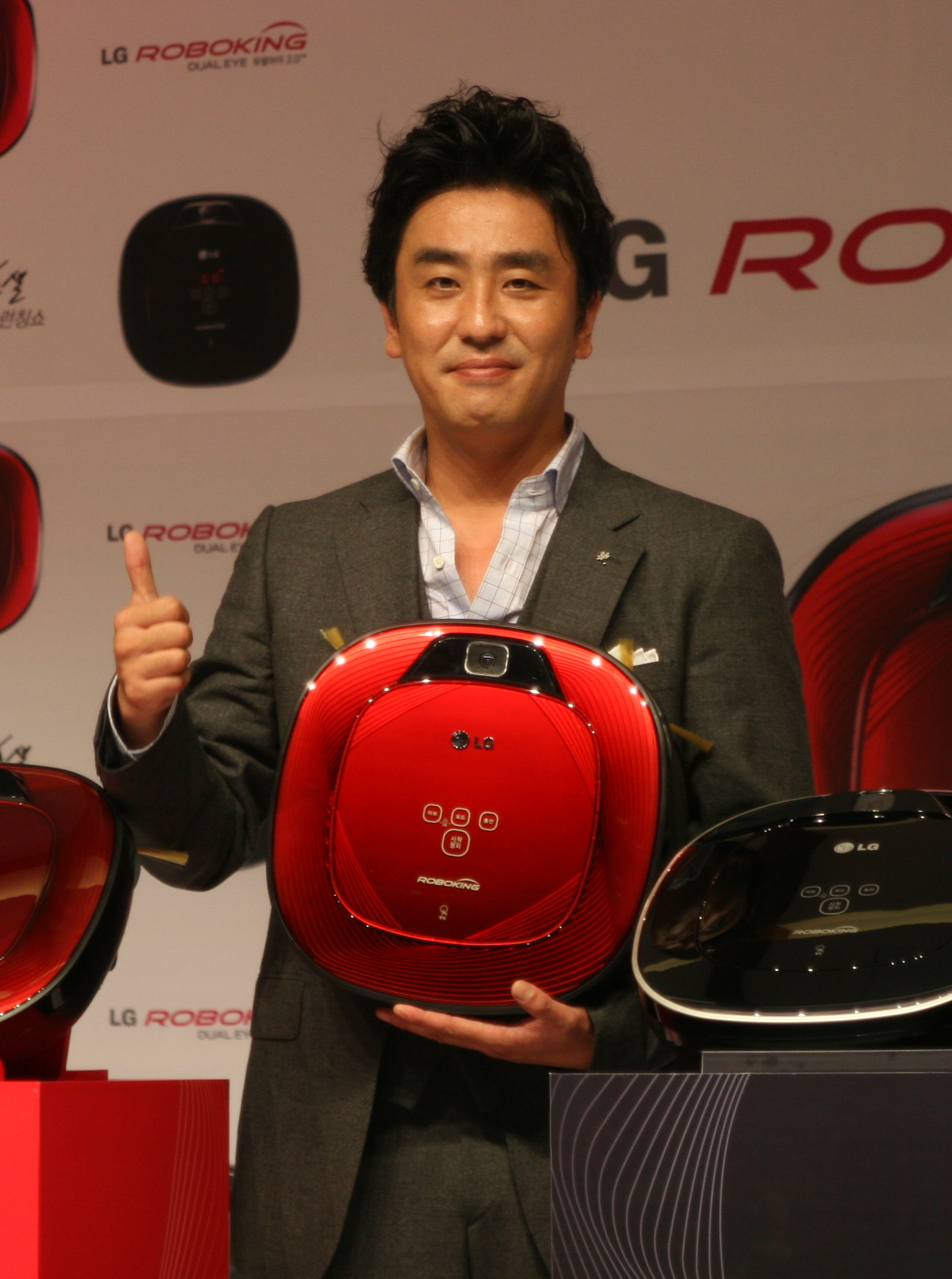
Ryu in September 2012

His run of collaborations continued in 2006 when he appeared in Jang Jin's Righteous Ties. He then appeared in a series of the director's films, including Good Morning President (2009) and Quiz Show (2010), making a solid impression on Chungmuro. He subsequently became a major star in Chungmuro with the box-office success of War of the Arrows (2011), All About My Wife (2012), and Masquerade (2012).

He has since become a versatile character actor in Korea. A sampling of the various roles he has played over the years: a mentally handicapped father in Miracle in Cell No. 7, the royal adviser Heo Gyun in Masquerade, an officer of the North Korean People's Army in The Front Line, a hard-nosed general of the Qing Dynastyin War of the Arrows, a ladies' man in All About My Wife, a gambling husband who fears his wife in The Quiz Show Scandal, a refined gay man in Personal Taste, a vengeful gangster in Secret, a reporter on the trail of a story in The Recipe, and the titular figure in The Piper.

=== 2019–Present: Second career heyday ===
In 2017, Ryu was cast in Kim Eun-hee's Netflix period zombie thriller Kingdom. The series premiered on January 25, 2019, and featured Ryu in the role of Lord Cho Hak-ju. Lord Cho is the Chief State Councilor of Joseon and the ruthless head of the Haewon Cho clan, positioning him as Lee Chang's (Ju Ji-hoon) primary political rival. As the father of the Queen Consort Cho, he desperately seeks to secure his power by making her unborn child the heir to the throne, replacing Lee Chang.

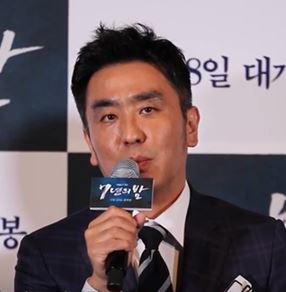
Ryu in March 2018

In 2019, Ryu starred in director Lee Byeong-heon's comedy film Extreme Job, which went on to become the second highest-grossing film of all time in South Korea. Ryu played Chief Detective Go, known as "The Zombie" for surviving 12 stab wounds. To catch a drug gang, he and his team set up an undercover surveillance post in a chicken restaurant. They end up buying the restaurant and accidentally create a popular rib marinade recipe, turning their operation into a successful fried chicken business.

Ryu reunited with director Park In-je, with whom he had previously collaborated on Season 2 of Kingdom, to join the Disney+ original series, Moving. This action-packed fantasy sci-fi series was written by Kang Full based on Kang's webtoon of the same name. The show features an ensemble cast including Ryu, Han Hyo-joo, Zo In-sung, Cha Tae-hyun, and others. In Moving, Ryu plays Jang Ju-won, a former gangster and ex-ANSP agent (code name Guryongpo) who runs a fried chicken shop and is the father of Hui-soo (Go Youn-jung). His character possesses healing abilities and superhuman strength, though he remains susceptible to pain. The series was released from August 9 to September 20, 2023. Just seven days after its debut, Moving became the most-watched Korean original series on Disney+ globally and Hulu in the United States, measured by hours streamed.

Continuing his work in streaming, Ryu reunited with director Lee Byeong-heon to lead the Netflix comedy series Chicken Nugget alongside Ahn Jae-hong. In the series, Ryu portrayed Choi Seon-man, the president of More Than Machines. The series follows Choi's desperate search for a method to return his daughter, Min-ah (Kim You-jung), to human form after her transformation into a chicken nugget by a mysterious machine.

In 2026, Ryu won the Grand Prize (Daesang) in the television category at the 62nd Baeksang Arts Awards for his performance in 'The Story of Manager Kim, Who Works at a Large Company and Owns a Home in Seoul'.

== Other ventures ==
=== Endorsements ===
Following the box-office success of All About My Wife (2012), Ryu Seung-ryong became a sought-after endorser for major brands, including Samsung Life Insurance, Kumon Learning Center, and SK Telecom. His endorsement deals were strategically finalized just before the release of Miracle in Cell No. 7 (2013). The timing of these commercials airing alongside the film's theatrical screening proved highly beneficial for the advertisers. Samsung Life Insurance, for example, noted an increase in advertising interest after the movie surpassed 10 million views. Similarly, SK Telecom experienced a surge in sales after airing its commercial, making it the top-selling new product in March, and the 90-second YouTube version of the ad neared 1 million views.

Following the success of 2014 historical film The Admiral: Roaring Currents, Ryu starred in The Baedal Minjok advertisement with the memorable slogan, "What kind of nation are we?" His campaigns ranged from cinematic broadcast ads to clever outdoor campaigns strategically placed in relevant locations. He won multiple advertising awards that year. The popularity of his CF (commercial film) for the BBQ chicken franchise, particularly the Paris Chicken line, led to a 500% increase in sales. His influence was formally recognized when he was named the Advertising Model of the Year at the 2014 Korea Advertising Awards.

In April 2024, Home Chicken SASE announced the selection of Ryu as its new brand model and launched a related campaign.

=== Philanthropy ===
In 2015, Ryu Seung-ryong donated 10 million won to support the independent film The Claws of the Five Generals, an adaptation of an award-winning play. The film's production costs were notably raised through citizen participation. Known for his interest in independent cinema and stage performances, Ryu contributed to the project after learning about the production.

On September 3, 2020, Ryu and actress Park Jin-hee lent their talents to a Greenpeace climate crisis campaign, both providing narration for the organization's television commercial.

== Personal life ==
Ryu Seung-ryong is a devout Christian and reportedly reads the Bible with his family every evening.

In addition to his acting career, Ryu is noted for his proficiency in a variety of skills, including bloodletting (phlebotomy), wooden swordsmanship, swimming, and singing. He is also skilled in woodworking and can construct simple furniture.

== Filmography ==
=== Film ===
Year	Title	Role	Notes	Ref.
2004	Someone Special	Robber 1	Bit part	
2005	Murder, Take One	Sung-joon		
2006	If You Were Me 2	Kim Joo-joong	Short film	
2006	Righteous Ties	Jung Soon-tan		
2006	Cruel Winter Blues	Lee Min-jae		
2007	Beyond the Years	Yong-taek		
2007	Hwang Jin-yi	Hee-yeol		
2007	Eleventh Mom	Jae-soo's father		
2007	My Love	Jeong-seok		
2009	My Girlfriend Is an Agent	Won-seok		
2009	Possessed	Detective Tae-hwan		
2009	Good Morning President	North Korean emissary	Cameo	
2009	Secret	"Jackal"		
2010	Bestseller	Park Young-joon		
2010	Blades of Blood	Nobleman Jung		
2010	The Quiz Show Scandal	Kim Sang-do		
2010	The Recipe	Choi Yoo-jin		
2011	Battlefield Heroes	Yeon Nam-geon		
2011	Children...	Hwang Woo-hyuk		
2011	The Front Line	Hyeon Jeong-yoon		
2011	War of the Arrows	Jyuushinta		
2012	All About My Wife	Jang Sung-ki		
2012	Masquerade	Heo Gyun		
2013	Miracle in Cell No. 7	Lee Yong-gu		
2014	The Target	Baek Yeo-hoon		
2014	The Admiral: Roaring Currents	Kurushima Michifusa		
2015	The Piper	Woo-ryong		
2015	The Sound of a Flower	Shin Jae-hyo		
2018	Psychokinesis	Suk-hun		
2018	Seven Years of Night	Hyun-soo		
2019	Extreme Job	Squad Chief Go		
2021	What Happened to Mr. Cha?	Himself	Cameo	
2021	The Book of Fish	Doctor	Cameo	
2021	Perhaps Love	Kim Hyun		
2022	Life Is Beautiful	Kang Jin-bong		
2022	20th Century Girl	Woon-ho's father	Voice cameo	
2024	Amazon Bullseye	Cho Jin-bong		
2026	Portrait of a Family	Hwang Jung-goo		
2026	Cattle Run	Man-soo		

=== Television ===
Year	Title	Role	Notes	Ref.
1998	Shadows of an Old Love	Sinawe		
2000	Foolish Love			
2005	Diamond Tears			
2007	Chosun Police 1	Kang Seung-jo		
2008	Mystery X-Files			
2008	U-Turn	Yong		
2008	Painter of the Wind	Kim Jo-nyeon		
2009	IRIS	Leader of IRIS mercenaries		
2010	Personal Taste	Choi Do-bin		
2014	My Love from the Star	Heo Gyun	Cameo (Episode 19)	
2019–2020	Kingdom	Lord Cho Hak-ju	Season 1–2	
2021	Jirisan	Narrator	Cameo (Episode 1)	
2023	The Good Bad Mother	Tailor	Cameo (Episode 13)	
2023	Moving	Jang Joo-won		
2024	Chicken Nugget	Choi Seon-man		
2025	Low Life	Oh Gwan-seok		
2025	The Dream Life of Mr. Kim	Kim Nak-soo		
2027	Miracles of the Namiya General Store †			

=== Music video appearances ===
Year	Song Title	Artist	Ref.
2004	"Close Your Eyes Quietly"	Jaewook Jeong	
2005	"Are You Happy?"	Kim Jang-hoon	
2005	"Snowman"	Gabi NJ	
2009	"Sign"	Brown Eyed Girls	
2021	"Keep Your Head Up" (네가 아는 너)	Lee Dong-hwi	

== Stage ==
=== Musical ===
Musical play performances
Year	Title		Role	Theater	Date	Ref.
Year	English	Korean	Role	Theater	Date	Ref.
	Jang Bogo	장보고	Jang Bogo			
1998	Nanta	난타	Head Chef	Dongsung Art Center Dongsung Hall	March 26 to May 3	
1999	Nanta	난타	Head Chef	Myeongdong Jeongdong Theater (foundation)	May 10	
1999	Nanta	난타	Head Chef	Edinburgh Festival Fringe	August 15 to September 4	
2000	12th Geochang International Theatre Festival: Nanta	(제12회) 거창국제연극제; 난타	Head Chef	Suseungdae Outdoor Theater	August 4	
2000–2006	Nanta	난타	Head Chef	PMC Nanta Theater	Open Run (2000–2006)	

=== Theater ===
Teater play performances of Ryu
Year	Title		Role	Venue	Date	Ref.
Year	English	Korean	Role	Venue	Date	Ref.
1998	The Reason She is Beautiful	그 여자가 아름다운 이유		Donrang Theater Ensemble	June 3 to 15	
2002	Welcome to Dongmakgol	웰컴 투 동막골	Villager	LG Arts Center in Yeoksam-dong	December 14 to 29	
2004	Taxi Driver	택시 드리벌	Taxi passenger	Arts Center Small Theater	Jul 16 to Aug 29	
2006	Death of a Salesman	세일즈맨의 죽음		Namsan Drama Center	September 29 to October 14	
2007–2008	Clumsy People	서툰 사람들 - 장진이 만든 코믹소란극	Jang Deok-bae	Dongsung Art Centre Small Theatre	Dec 7 to Mar 16	
