= Chicken Nugget (TV series) =

2024 South Korean television series

- Promotional poster
- Hangul: 닭강정
- RR: Dakgangjeong
- MR: Takkangjŏng
- Genre: Comedy; Mystery
- Based on: Chicken Nugget by Park Ji-dok
- Developed by: Kwon Mi-kyung
- Written by: Lee Byeong-heon
- Directed by: Lee Byeong-heon
- Starring: Ryu Seung-ryong; Ahn Jae-hong; Kim You-jung
- Music by: Kim Tae-seong
- Country of origin: South Korea
- Original language: Korean
- No. of episodes: 10

Production
- Producers: Kang Mi-kyung; Jang Jae-ho; Lee Jong-seok
- Cinematography: Noh Seung-bo
- Editor: Nam Na-young
- Running time: 28–37 minutes
- Production companies: Studio N; Plus Media Entertainment

Original release
- Network: Netflix
- Release: March 15, 2024

Chicken Nugget (Korean: 닭강정) is a 2024 South Korean comedy mystery television series written and directed by Lee Byeong-heon, and starring Ryu Seung-ryong, Ahn Jae-hong, and Kim You-jung. Based on the Naver webtoon of the same name, it is a comic mystery chase drama about the struggles of a father to recover his daughter who entered a mysterious machine and turned into a chicken nugget, assisted by a man who has a crush on her. It was released on Netflix in selected regions on March 15, 2024.

== Synopsis ==
Choi Min-ah, the daughter of a company president, mistakes a new machine as a device which helps her with her fatigue, and she is accidentally turned into a chicken nugget. As her father, Choi Seon-man and intern Go Baek-joong who has a crush on her, try to turn her back into a human, they discover unexpected secrets.

== Cast and characters ==
=== Main ===
- Ryu Seung-ryong as Choi Seon-man

The president of More Than Machines, who tries to turn his daughter back into a human.

- Ahn Jae-hong as Go Baek-joong

An intern who has a crush on his boss's daughter, Min-ah.

- Kim You-jung as Choi Min-ah

Choi Seon-man's daughter who enters a mysterious machine thinking it is a fatigue recovery machine and turns into a chicken nugget.

=== Special appearances ===
- Jung Ho-yeon as Hong Cha

Korea's best taste columnist.

- Park Jin-young as Yoo Tae-young

Yoo Tae-man's handsome older brother.

- Ko Chang-seok as Baek-joong's father
- Moon Sang-hoon as Jeong Hyo-bong

A man who is entangled with a mysterious machine and appears at the right time.

- Yoo Seung-mok as Yoo In-won

A doctor crazy about mechanical research.

- Jeong Seung-gil as Yoo Tae-man

A man who has the strongest presbyopia complex.

- Kim Tae-hoon as employee of More Than Machines
- Hwang Mi-young as employee of More Than Machines
- Jeong Sun-won as employee of More Than Machines
- Lee Ha-nui as employee of More Than Machines
- Kim Nam-hee as Kim Hwan-dong, an employee
- Yang Hyun-min
- Heo Jun-seok
- Park Hyung-soo as Interviewer
- Lee Joo-bin

== Episodes ==
| No. | Title | Directed by | Written by | Original release date |
|---|---|---|---|---|
| 1 | "Episode 1" | Lee Byeong-heon | Lee Byeong-heon | March 15, 2024 |
| 2 | "Episode 2" | Lee Byeong-heon | Lee Byeong-heon | March 15, 2024 |
| 3 | "Episode 3" | Lee Byeong-heon | Lee Byeong-heon | March 15, 2024 |
| 4 | "Episode 4" | Lee Byeong-heon | Lee Byeong-heon | March 15, 2024 |
| 5 | "Episode 5" | Lee Byeong-heon | Lee Byeong-heon | March 15, 2024 |
| 6 | "Episode 6" | Lee Byeong-heon | Lee Byeong-heon | March 15, 2024 |
| 7 | "Episode 7" | Lee Byeong-heon | Lee Byeong-heon | March 15, 2024 |
| 8 | "Episode 8" | Lee Byeong-heon | Lee Byeong-heon | March 15, 2024 |
| 9 | "Episode 9" | Lee Byeong-heon | Lee Byeong-heon | March 15, 2024 |
| 10 | "Episode 10" | Lee Byeong-heon | Lee Byeong-heon | March 15, 2024 |

== Production ==
Filming began in progress in November 2022.

In an interview, director Lee Byeong-heon said: "We recently finished filming and will be released on Netflix at the earliest at the end of 2023, or early next year at the latest".

== Reception ==
=== Critical response ===
On the review aggregator website Rotten Tomatoes, 100% of 5 critics' reviews are positive, with an average rating of 7.5/10. Pierce Conran of South China Morning Post wrote that "even among Netflix's growing catalogue of dystopian dramas, twisty thrillers and sci-fi tentpoles, Chicken Nugget stands out, thanks to its saturated colours, heightened tone and absurd sense of humour". Jonathan Wilson of Ready Steady Cut rated it a 3.5/5 and wrote that the series is a "work of sneaky genius". Joel Keller of Decider wrote that this series "is silly as hell, but it promises to be one of those shows where two people go on a crazy adventure" and "just happens to involve a woman who becomes a chicken nugget". Sarah Musnicky of But Why Tho? rated it a 8/10 and wrote it "dials everything up to a ten and then some" and "it is absurdist, comedic fun and spares no expense or time in embracing its quirky energy". Joly Herman of Common Sense Media wrote that "some sinister undertones and the copious use of language makes this show a better choice for older teens" and "fans of irrational sci-fi will appreciate this one the most".

=== Viewership ===
Chicken Nugget ranked tenth in Netflix's Global Top 10 TV (Non-English) category for the week of March 18–24, 2024, and received a warm response in seven countries including South Korea.

=== Accolades ===
==== Awards and nominations ====
Name of the award ceremony, year presented, category, nominee of the award, and the result of the nomination
| Award ceremony | Year | Category | Nominee | Result | Ref. |
|---|---|---|---|---|---|
| International Emmy Awards | 2025 | Best Comedy | Chicken Nugget | Nominated | |

==== Listicles ====
Name of publisher, year listed, name of listicle, and placement
| Publisher | Year | Listicle | Placement | Ref. |
|---|---|---|---|---|
| NME | 2024 | The 10 best K-dramas of 2024 – so far | Placed | |
