= Kim Tae-seong (composer) =

- Born: August 4, 1979 (age 47); South Korea
- Occupations: Composer, music director
- Years active: 2002–present
- Website: kimtaeseong-studio.com

Korean name
- Hangul: 김태성
- RR: Gim Taeseong
- MR: Kim T'aesŏng

Kim Tae-seong (Korean: 김태성; born August 4, 1979) is a South Korean film and television composer. His credits include the films Crossing (2008), War of the Arrows (2011), The Admiral: Roaring Currents (2014), 1987: When the Day Comes (2017), Extreme Job (2019), Space Sweepers (2021), The Roundup (2022) and the television series Emergency Couple (2014), Squad 38 (2016), Bad Guys 2 (2017), The Guest (2018), and My Liberation Notes (2022).

== Filmography ==
=== Short film ===
Year	Title	Notes
2002	It Was Raining (2002; short film)	
2003	The Girl With Red Shoes (2003; short film)	
2003	My Daddy (2003; short film)	
2004	Her Earring (2004; featurette)	
2004	A Grand Day Out (2004; featurette)	
2005	Goodbye (2005; featurette)	
2005	Waiting for Youngjae (2005; short film)	
2005	HD209458b (2005; featurette)	
2005	Slowly (2005; short film)	
2006	No Sympathy (2006; short film)	
2006	Monologue #1 (2006; short film)	
2006	Screw-driver (2006; short film)	
2006	Son's (2006; short film)	
2007	Enemy's Apple (2007; short film)	
2007	Their Familiar Date (2007; short film)	
2007	Lost (2007; short film)	
2007	Waiting (2007; short film)	
2007	Thank You (2007; short film)	
2008	Trend Of This Fall (2008; short film)	
2008	Hey, Tom (2008; short film)	
2008	I Hope To Be Cloud! (2008; short film)	
2008	The Great Player (2009; short film)	
2008	The Newly Coming Seasons (2009; short film)	
2010	Dart (2010; short film)	
2015	Hunting (2015; short film)	

=== Feature film ===
Feature film credit
Year	Title	Role		
Year	Title	Music	Music Dept.	Other
2004	Au Revoir, UFO	Yes	Yes	NA
2005	The Red Shoes	—N/a	Yes	Sound Dept.
2005	Duelist	—N/a	Yes	Trailer
2005	Bee Season	—N/a	Yes	
2005	Haan	—N/a	Yes	
2006	One Shining Day	Yes	—N/a	Sound
2006	A Millionaire's First Love	Yes	—N/a	
2008	A Tale of Legendary Libido	Yes	—N/a	
2008	Crossing	Yes	—N/a	
2008	The Accidental Gangster and the Mistaken Courtesan	Yes	—N/a	
2008	Lovers	Yes	—N/a	
2009	More than Blue	Yes	—N/a	Piano
2010	Bedevilled	Yes	—N/a	
2010	Eighteen	Yes	—N/a	
2010	Cyrano Agency	Yes	—N/a	Orchestra Arranged
2010	Come, Closer	Yes	—N/a	Composition arrangement
2011	Officer of the Year	Yes	—N/a	Sound Dept.
2011	S.I.U.	Yes	—N/a	Sound Dept.
2011	War of the Arrows	Yes	—N/a	
2011	Perfect Game (2011)	Yes	—N/a	Sound Dept.
2012	As One	Yes	—N/a	
2012	The Grand Heist	Yes	—N/a	
2012	Ghost Sweepers	Yes	—N/a	Music by
2012	Wonderful Radio	—N/a	Yes	
2012	The Tower	Yes	—N/a	Music Compose
2012	Cheer Up Mr. Lee	—N/a	Yes	The ending guitar song Composing the ending song
2013	The Flu	Yes	—N/a	
2013	Steel Cold Winter	Yes	—N/a	
2013	Black Gospel	Yes	—N/a	
2013	It's Time to Love	Yes	—N/a	
2013	Han Gong-ju	Yes	—N/a	
2014	Innocent Thing	Yes	—N/a	
2014	Apostle	Yes	—N/a	
2014	Bad Sister	Yes	—N/a	
2014	A Midsummer's Fantasia	—N/a	Yes	
2014	The Admiral: Roaring Currents	Yes	—N/a	
2015	Granny's Got Talent	Yes	—N/a	
2015	Twenty	Yes	—N/a	
2015	Office	Yes	—N/a	
2015	The Priests	Yes	—N/a	
2015	The Sound of a Flower	Yes	—N/a	
2016	Mood of the Day	Yes	—N/a	
2016	Phantom Detective	Yes	—N/a	
2016	The Hunt	Yes	—N/a	
2016	Familyhood	Yes	—N/a	
2016	My Annoying Brother	Yes	—N/a	Music Director; Composed; Arranged; String Arranged; Programming; Mixed
2017	The King's Case Note	Yes	—N/a	
2017	Fabricated City	Yes	—N/a	
2017	Steel Rain	Yes	—N/a	
2017	1987: When the Day Comes	Yes	—N/a	
2017	Need for Speed: Edge (2017; video game)	Yes	—N/a	
2018	Be-Bop-A-Lula	Yes	—N/a	
2018	Golden Slumber	Yes	—N/a	
2018	What a Man Wants	Yes	—N/a	
2018	Sovereign Default	Yes	—N/a	
2019	Extreme Job	Yes	—N/a	
2019	Svaha: The Sixth Finger	Yes	—N/a	
2019	Idol	Yes	—N/a	
2021	Space Sweepers	Yes	—N/a	
2021	Miracle: Letters to the President	Yes	—N/a	
2021	I Want to Know Your Parents	Yes	—N/a	
2022	The Roundup	Yes	—N/a	
2024	Exhuma	Yes	—N/a	
2025	Your Letter	Yes	—N/a	

=== Television series ===
Year	Title	Notes
2014	Emergency Couple	
2016	Squad 38	
2017	Bad Guys 2	
2018	The Guest	
2018–19	Sky Castle	
2019	Watcher	
2019	Be Melodramatic	
2020	Money Game	
2021	L.U.C.A.: The Beginning	
2021	Law School	
2021	Nevertheless	
2021	Yumi's Cells	
2021	Inspector Koo	
2021	Happiness	
2021–22	Snowdrop	
2022	Juvenile Justice	
2022	My Liberation Notes	
2022	Money Heist: Korea – Joint Economic Area	
2023	Behind Your Touch	
2023	Arthdal Chronicles 2	
2023	Gyeongseong Creature	S1-2
2023	Vigilante	Web series
2023	Decoy	Web series
2023	A Bloody Lucky Day	
2024	Chicken Nugget	
2024	Hierarchy	
2024	Mr. Plankton	
2025	Heavenly Ever After	
2025	Dear Hongrang	
2025	Our Movie	
2025	The Manipulated	
2026	The Wonderfools	
2026	Perfect Crown	
2026	The Perfect Lie	
2026	100 Days of Deception	
2026	The Remarried Empress	

== Awards and nominations ==
Year	Award	Category	Nominated work	Result	Ref.
2008	28th Korean Association of Film Critics Awards	Best Music	Crossing	Won	
2008	16th Chunsa Film Art Awards	Best Music	Crossing	Won	
2010	31st Blue Dragon Film Awards	Best Music	Cyrano Agency	Nominated	
2011	32nd Blue Dragon Film Awards	Best Music	War of the Arrows	Nominated	
2014	23rd Buil Film Awards	Best Music	The Admiral: Roaring Currents	Nominated	
2014	35th Blue Dragon Film Awards	Best Music	The Admiral: Roaring Currents	Nominated	
2014	51st Grand Bell Awards	Best Music	The Admiral: Roaring Currents	Nominated	
2016	37th Blue Dragon Film Awards	Best Music	The Priests	Nominated	
2018	14th Jecheon International Music & Film Festival	JIMFF OST	1987: When the Day Comes	Won	
2018	27th Buil Film Awards	Best Music	1987: When the Day Comes	Nominated	
2018	55th Grand Bell Awards	Best Music	1987: When the Day Comes	Nominated	
2018	38th Korean Association of Film Critics Awards	Best Music	1987: When the Day Comes	Won	
2021	42nd Blue Dragon Film Awards	Best Music	Miracle: Letters to the President	Nominated	
2025	46th Blue Dragon Film Awards	Best Music	My Daughter is a Zombie	Nominated	
