= List of 2026 box office number-one films in South Korea =

The following is a list of 2026 box office number-one films in South Korea by weekend. When the number-one film in gross is not the same as the number-one film in admissions, both are listed.

== Number-one films ==
†	This implies the highest-grossing movie of the year.

#	Date	Film	Weekend gross	Admissions	Ref.
1	January 4, 2026	Avatar: Fire and Ash	$5,053,912	630,616	
2	January 11, 2026	Once We Were Us	$2,256,019	340,270	
3	January 18, 2026	Once We Were Us	$2,101,393	316,404	
4	January 25, 2026	Once We Were Us	$1,694,889	254,287	
5	February 1, 2026	Once We Were Us	$1,187,621	179,738	
6	February 8, 2026	The King's Warden†	$4,838,320	761,820	
7	February 15, 2026	The King's Warden†	$6,194,449	956,716	
8	February 22, 2026	The King's Warden†	$9,178,749	1,414,164	
9	March 1, 2026	The King's Warden†	$11,442,057	1,750,964	
10	March 8, 2026	The King's Warden†	$11,254,468	1,725,718	
11	March 15, 2026	The King's Warden†	$8,213,941	1,253,681	
12	March 22, 2026	The King's Warden†	$5,282,606	803,658	
13	March 29, 2026	The King's Warden†	$3,377,309	511,881	
14	April 5, 2026	Project Hail Mary	$2,412,267	328,750	
15	April 12, 2026	Salmokji: Whispering Water	$3,775,048	536,419	
16	April 19, 2026	Salmokji: Whispering Water	$3,282,805	472,100	
17	April 26, 2026	Salmokji: Whispering Water	$2,410,807	343,455	
18	May 3, 2026	The Super Mario Galaxy Movie	$3,799,893	575,457	
19	May 10, 2026	The Devil Wears Prada 2	$1,362,280	195,513	
20	May 17, 2026	Michael	$3,833,809	470,371	
21	May 24, 2026	Colony	$10,105,948	1,283,342	
22	May 31, 2026	Colony	$7,220,143	970,996	
23	June 7, 2026	Colony	$4,372,727	603,857	
24	June 14, 2026	Colony	$2,200,178	301,041	
25	June 21, 2026	Toy Story 5	$5,211,577	713,028	
26	June 28, 2026	Toy Story 5	$3,634,774	502,935	
27	July 5, 2026	Toy Story 5	$3,068,266	429,032	
28	July 12, 2026	Moana	$3,185,171	403,920	
29	July 19, 2026	Hope	$11,866,323	1,503,945	
30	July 26, 2026	Hope	$5,737,967	767,345	
31	August 2, 2026	Spider-Man: Brand New Day	$17,103,229	2,252,881	
32	August 9, 2026	The Odyssey	$10,334,966	1,333,469	
33	August 16, 2026	The Odyssey	$13,240,956	1,691,746	
34	August 23, 2026	The Odyssey	$10,657,529	1,321,199	
35	August 30, 2026	The Odyssey	$8,711,159	1,058,651	
36	September 6, 2026	The Odyssey	$5,968,980	698,376	
37	September 13, 2026	The Odyssey	$3,947,376	449,474	
38	September 20, 2026	The Intern	$1,978,659	275,183	
39	September 27, 2026	The Assassin(s)	$8,212,846	1,119,154	
40	October 4, 2026	The Assassin(s)	$3,044,640	412,006	
41	October 11, 2026	Chiikawa the Movie: The Secret of the Mermaid Island	$3,156,207	407,895	
42	October 18, 2026	Chiikawa the Movie: The Secret of the Mermaid Island	$2,898,237	378,474	

== Highest-grossing films ==
International film South Korean film

Highest-grossing films of 2026 (In year release)
Rank	Title	Distributor	Domestic gross
1	The King's Warden	BA Entertainment	$121,512,896
2	The Odyssey	Universal Pictures	$91,172,013
3	Spider-Man: Brand New Day	Sony Pictures Releasing	$68,381,226
4	Colony	Showbox	$45,398,558
5	Hope	Megabox Plus M	$36,293,368
6	Salmokji: Whispering Water	Showbox	$24,227,144
7	Project Hail Mary	Sony Pictures Releasing International	$24,012,648
8	The Assassin(s)	Hive Media Corp	$22,419,732
9	Toy Story 5	Walt Disney Studios Motion Pictures	$22,434,036
10	Avatar: Fire and Ash	20th Century Studios	$19,269,094

== See also ==
- List of South Korean films of 2026
- List of 2025 box office number-one films in South Korea
- 2026 in South Korea
- List of 2024 box office number-one films in South Korea
