= List of 2025 box office number-one films in South Korea =

The following is a list of 2025 box office number-one films in South Korea by weekend. When the number-one film in gross is not the same as the number-one film in admissions, both are listed.

#	Date	Film	Weekend gross	Admissions	Ref.
1	January 5, 2025	Harbin	$3,236,588	483,915	
2	January 12, 2025	Harbin	$2,056,877	308,018	
3	January 19, 2025	Harbin	$1,215,711	182,107	
4	January 26, 2025	Dark Nuns	$3,984,501	588,481	
5	February 2, 2025	Hitman 2	$2,788,548	450,753	
6	February 9, 2025	Hitman 2	$1,328,486	201,550	
7	February 16, 2025	Captain America: Brave New World	$4,099,342	583,859	
8	February 23, 2025	Captain America: Brave New World	$2,224,843	316,146	
9	March 2, 2025	Mickey 17	$6,680,139	980,549	
10	March 9, 2025	Mickey 17	$3,853,633	562,205	
11	March 16, 2025	Mickey 17	$2,218,222	323,564	
12	March 23, 2025	Mickey 17	$928,450	140,159	
13	March 30, 2025	The Match	$3,540,410	544,261	
14	April 6, 2025	The Match	$2,744,027	427,002	
15	April 13, 2025	The Match	$2,117,857	306,447	
16	April 20, 2025	Yadang: The Snitch	$4,230,043	610,184	
17	April 27, 2025	Yadang: The Snitch	$3,634,517	521,450	
18	May 4, 2025	Yadang: The Snitch	$2,712,902	391,185	
19	May 11, 2025	Yadang: The Snitch	$1,681,085	242,432	
20	May 18, 2025	Mission: Impossible – The Final Reckoning	$5,531,203	759,457	
21	May 25, 2025	Mission: Impossible – The Final Reckoning	$5,065,902	688,138	
22	June 1, 2025	Hi-Five	$2,614,586	380,325	
23	June 8, 2025	How to Train Your Dragon	$4,016,721	541,015	
24	June 15, 2025	How to Train Your Dragon	$2,395,387	318,949	
25	June 22, 2025	How to Train Your Dragon	$1,587,535	213,523	
26	June 29, 2025	F1	$2,804,727	347,431	
27	July 6, 2025	Jurassic World Rebirth	$5,654,295	804,661	
28	July 13, 2025	Jurassic World Rebirth	$3,125,892	456,134	
29	July 20, 2025	F1	$2,649,607	332,898	
30	July 27, 2025	Omniscient Reader: The Prophet	$3,202,684	427,336	
31	August 3, 2025	My Daughter Is a Zombie	$8,308,330	1,167,883	
32	August 10, 2025	My Daughter Is a Zombie	$3,612,010	515,617	
33	August 17, 2025	My Daughter Is a Zombie	$5,392,796	763,403	
34	August 24, 2025	Demon Slayer: Kimetsu no Yaiba – The Movie: Infinity Castle	$8,788,064	1,124,283	
35	August 31, 2025	Demon Slayer: Kimetsu no Yaiba – The Movie: Infinity Castle	$6,332,090	800,828	
36	September 7, 2025	Demon Slayer: Kimetsu no Yaiba – The Movie: Infinity Castle	$3,884,628	498,839	
37	September 14, 2025	Demon Slayer: Kimetsu no Yaiba – The Movie: Infinity Castle	$2,664,076	330,436	
38	September 21, 2025	The Ugly	$1,918,287	254,973	
39	September 28, 2025	No Other Choice	$4,611,543	609,277	
40	October 5, 2025	Boss	$4,524,546	666,659	
41	October 12, 2025	Chainsaw Man – The Movie: Reze Arc	$2,418,758	324,164	
42	October 19, 2025	Chainsaw Man – The Movie: Reze Arc	$1,845,221	246,133	
43	October 26, 2025	Chainsaw Man – The Movie: Reze Arc	$1,655,216	219,686	
44	November 2, 2025	The First Ride	$1,551,680	230,777	
45	November 9, 2025	Predator: Badlands	$1,164,231	160,174	
46	November 16, 2025	Now You See Me: Now You Don't	$2,861,688	435,288	
47	November 23, 2025	Wicked: For Good	$2,672,739	376,084	
48	November 30, 2025	Zootopia 2	$10,902,308	1,623,889	
49	December 7, 2025	Zootopia 2	$8,352,863	1,252,876	
50	December 14, 2025	Zootopia 2	$6,844,990	1,006,398	
51	December 21, 2025	Avatar: Fire and Ash	$10,493,485	1,299,978	
52	December 28, 2025	Avatar: Fire and Ash	$8,608,520	1,053,487	

== Highest-grossing films ==
International film South Korean film

Highest-grossing films of 2025 (In year release)
Rank	Title	Distributor	Domestic gross
1	Zootopia 2	Walt Disney	$50,692,343
2	Demon Slayer: Kimetsu no Yaiba – The Movie: Infinity Castle	Crunchyroll	$42,741,491
3	F1	Warner Bros. Pictures	$38,302,620
4	My Daughter Is a Zombie	Next Entertainment World	$37,045,879
5	Avatar: Fire and Ash	20th Century Studios	$33,684,141
6	Chainsaw Man – The Movie: Reze Arc	Crunchyroll	$25,136,717
7	Mission: Impossible – The Final Reckoning	Paramount Pictures	$23,188,902
8	Yadang: The Snitch	Plus M Entertainment	$22,313,441
9	Mickey 17	Warner Bros. Pictures	$20,713,359
10	No Other Choice	CJ Entertainment	$20,057,380

== See also ==
- List of South Korean films of 2025
- List of 2024 box office number-one films in South Korea
- 2025 in South Korea
- List of 2026 box office number-one films in South Korea
