= Lee El =

South Korean actress (born 1982)

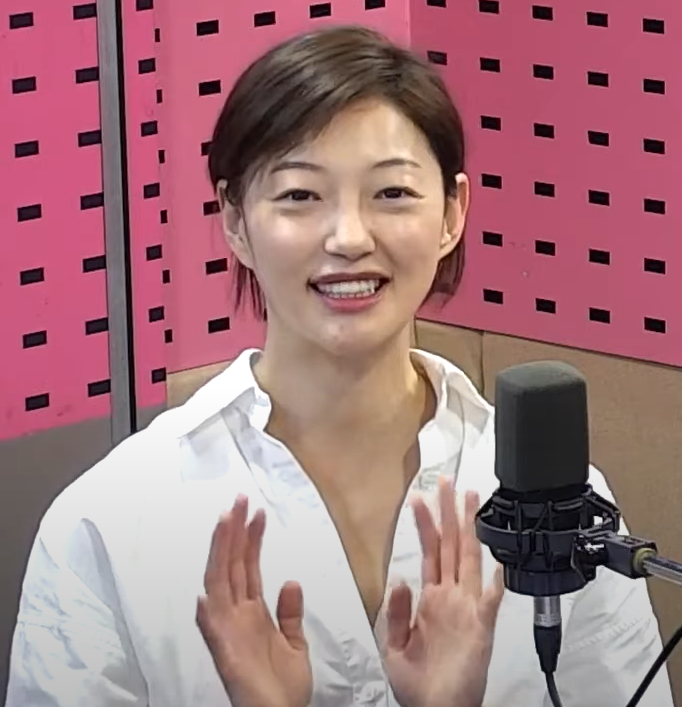
- Lee in May 2022
- Born: Kim Ji-hyun; June 26, 1982 (age 44); Seoul, South Korea
- Education: Sungkyunkwan University
- Occupation: Actress
- Years active: 2009–present
- Agent: Kiul Company

Korean name
- Hangul: 김지현
- RR: Gim Jihyeon
- MR: Kim Chihyŏn

Stage name
- Hangul: 이엘
- RR: I El
- MR: I El

Kim Ji-hyun (Korean: 김지현; born June 26, 1982), known professionally as Lee El (이엘) is a South Korean actress. She is best known for her supporting roles in the film Inside Men (2015), the television series It's Okay, That's Love (2014), Guardian: The Lonely and Great God (2016–2017), A Korean Odyssey (2017–2018), and Black (2017) as well as her leading roles in the film What a Man Wants (2018) and television series My Liberation Notes (2022).

== Filmography ==
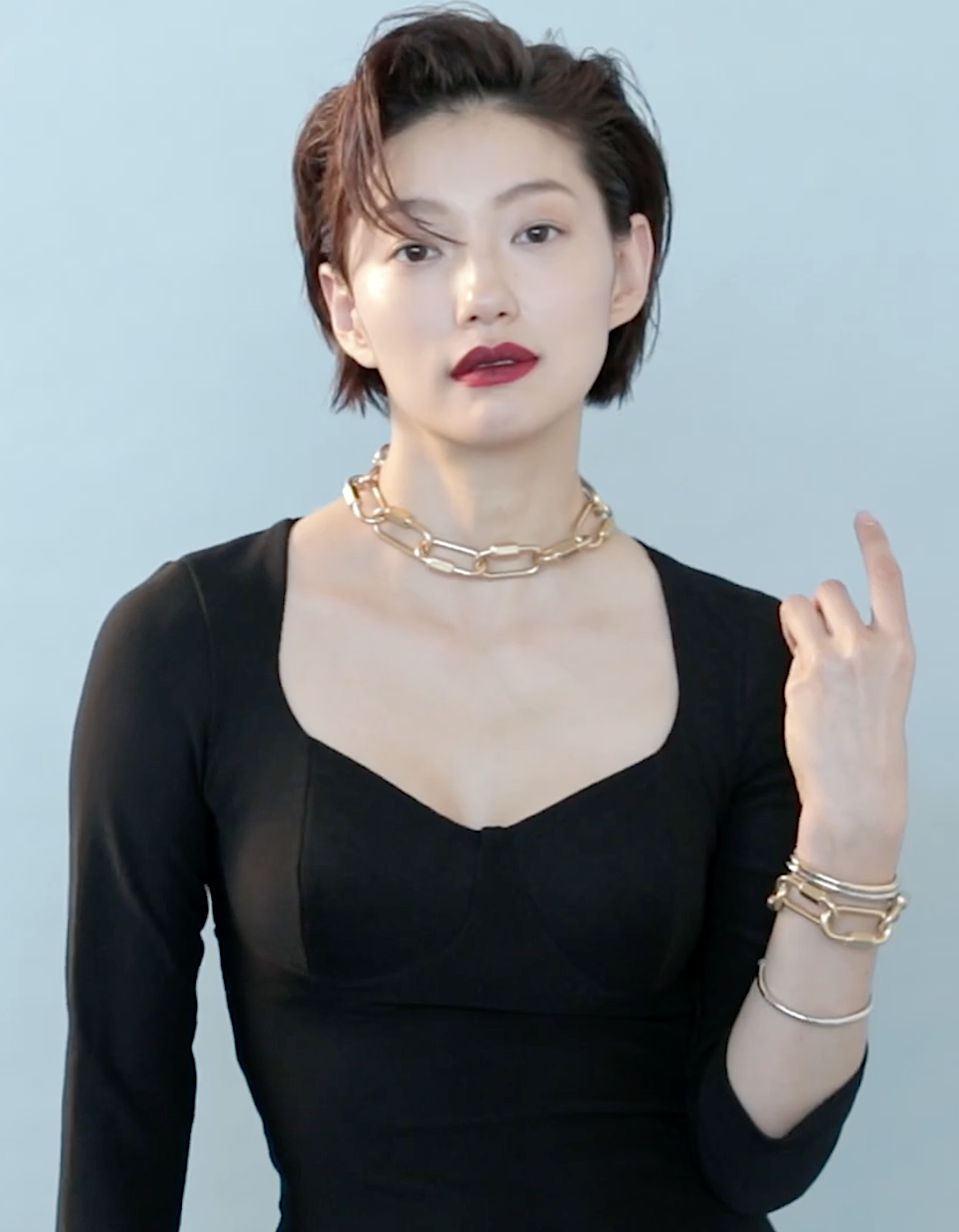
Lee in 2018

=== Film ===
Year	Title	Role	Notes	Ref.
2009	Secret	Young-sook		
2010	The Yellow Sea	Joo-young		
2012	Pacemaker	Choi Min-kyung		
2012	Masquerade	Ahn Gae-shi		
2014	One Thing She Doesn't Have	Se-ra		
2014	Man on High Heels	Do Do		
2015	Inside Men	Joo Eun-hye		
2018	What a Man Wants	Jenny		
2019	Scent of a Ghost	Ji-yun		
2020	The Call	Sunwoo Ja-ok	Netflix film	
2022	Love and Leashes	Hye-Mi	Netflix film	
2022	Yaksha: Ruthless Operations	Hee-won	Netflix film	
2024	Following	Oh Young-joo		
TBA	Heaven: To the Land of Happiness			

=== Television series ===
Year	Title	Role	Notes	Ref.
2009	Good Job, Good Job	Min-joo		
2011	Drama Special Series: "White Christmas"	Oh Jung-hye		
2011	Detectives in Trouble	Yoo Hye-min		
2011	The Princess' Man	Mae-hyang		
2012	Wild Romance	Mi-jin		
2013	7th Grade Civil Servant	Park Soo-young		
2013	Drama Festival: "Swine Escape"	Wol-hyang		
2014	Mother's Garden	Kim Ja-kyung		
2014	It's Okay, That's Love	Se-ra	Cameo (Ep 1–2)	
2014	Liar Game	Oh Jung-ah (Jaime)		
2015	More Than a Maid	Lady Kang		
2015	Divorce Lawyer in Love	Han Mi-ri		
2015	My Beautiful Bride	Son Hye-jung		
2015	Hello Monster	Kang Sung-eun	Cameo (Ep 9–10)	
2015	Imaginary Cat	Dokgo Soon		
2016	Monster	Ok Chae-ryung		
2016	Entourage	Herself	Cameo (Ep 13–16)	
2016	Guardian: The Lonely and Great God	Samsin Halmeoni		
2017	Black	Yoon Soo-wan		
2017	A Korean Odyssey	Ma Ji-young		
2018	Matrimonial Chaos	Jin Yoo-young		
2019	When the Devil Calls Your Name	Ji Seo-young		
2022	My Liberation Notes	Yeom Ki-jeong		
2023	Battle for Happiness	Jang Mi-ho		
2024	Mr. Plankton	Bong Ju-ri		
2025	When the Stars Gossip	Kang Tae-hee		
2025	Queen Mantis	Kim Na-hee		
2025	My Troublesome Star	Ko Hui-yeong		
2025	Surely Tomorrow	Seo Ji-yeon		

=== Web series ===
Year	Title	Role	Notes	Ref.
2018	Ambergris	AI	Voice	

== Theater ==
Year	Title	Role	Ref.
2011–2012	Return to Hamlet	So-hee	

== Awards and nominations ==
Name of the award ceremony, year presented, category, nominee of the award, and the result of the nomination
Award ceremony	Year	Category	Nominee / Work	Result	Ref.
APAN Star Awards	2022	Best Supporting Actress	My Liberation Notes	Nominated	
Baeksang Arts Awards	2023	Best Supporting Actress – Television	My Liberation Notes	Nominated	
Blue Dragon Film Awards	2021	Best Supporting Actress	The Call	Nominated	
Grand Bell Awards	2016	Best Supporting Actress	Inside Men	Nominated	
KBS Drama Awards	2018	Excellence Award, Actress in a Miniseries	Matrimonial Chaos	Nominated	
MBC Drama Awards	2016	Golden Acting Award, Actress in a Special Project Drama	Monster	Nominated	
