= A Boyfriend for My Wife (2022 film) =

- Theatrical release poster
- Spanish: Un novio para mi mujer
- Directed by: Laura Mañá
- Written by: Pol Cortecans; Laura Mañá
- Based on: A Boyfriend for My Wife by Pablo Solarz
- Starring: Diego Martín; Belén Cuesta; Hugo Silva
- Cinematography: Sergi Gallardo
- Edited by: Paula González
- Music by: Alfred Tapscott
- Production companies: Arcadia Motion Pictures; Athos Pictures
- Distributed by: Universal Pictures International Spain
- Release date: 22 July 2022
- Country: Spain
- Language: Spanish

A Boyfriend for My Wife (Spanish: Un novio para mi mujer) is a 2022 Spanish romantic comedy film directed by Laura Mañá, remaking the 2008 Argentine film of the same name. It stars Diego Martín, Belén Cuesta, and Hugo Silva.

== Plot ==
Diego wants to separate from his wife Lucía, but rather than facing the issue upfront, he hires a purportedly professional handsome devil (Cuervo Flores) to seduce Lucía, so Lucía is the one to bring their marriage to an end.

== Cast ==
- Diego Martín as Diego
- Belén Cuesta as Lucía
- Hugo Silva as Cuervo Flores
- Joaquín Reyes as Carlos
- Eric Masip
- Andreu Castro
- Ángela Cervantes as Sara
- Roger Berruezo

== Production ==
A remake of A Boyfriend for My Wife's original script by Pablo Solarz, the adapted screenplay was penned by Laura Mañá and Pol Cortecans. The film was produced by Arcadia Motion Pictures and Athos Pictures, and it had the participation of Amazon Prime Video, the funding from ICAA, and support from ICEC. It was shot in Barcelona in 2021.

== Release ==
Distributed by Universal Pictures International Spain, the film was theatrically released in Spain on 22 July 2022.

== Reception ==
Andrea G. Bermejo of Cinemanía rated the film 2½ out of 5 stars considering that the film loses its initial punch as it advances, otherwise highlighting Cuesta's "superb" performance as a disenchanted woman.

Blai Morell of Fotogramas rated the film 3 out of 5 stars, assessing that Mañá "takes everything that was good, which was not much", from Juan Taratuto's film, giving it a more sophisticated look, polishing dialogues and situations, and letting the lead trio shine.

Beatriz Martínez of El Periódico de Catalunya rated the film 2 out of 5 stars, considering that the cast (except Silva), including an "uninspiring" couple played by Cuesta and Martín, is largely interchangeable, although she conceded that "at least it does not insult the viewer's intelligence like other [comedies]", has some good gags and it runs without embarrassing jolts.

Carmen L. Lobo of La Razón rated the film 3 out of 5 stars, considering that Mañá managed to deliver a "funny comedy with really salacious situations thanks to its excellent cast".

== Accolades ==
Year	Award	Category	Nominee(s)	Result	Ref.
2023	2nd Carmen Awards	Best Actress	Belén Cuesta	Nominated	

== See also ==
- List of Spanish films of 2022
