= What a Man Wants =

2018 film by Lee Byeong-heon

- Theatrical release poster
- Hangul: 바람 바람 바람
- Lit.: Wind Wind Wind
- RR: Baram baram baram
- MR: Param param param
- Directed by: Lee Byeong-heon
- Written by: Jang Kyu-sung; Lee Byeong-heon
- Produced by: Kim Chul-yong; Lee Min-su
- Starring: Lee Sung-min; Shin Ha-kyun; Song Ji-hyo; Lee El
- Cinematography: Noh Seung-bo
- Edited by: Jeong Gye-hyeon; Nam Na-yeong
- Music by: Kim Tae-seong
- Production company: Hive Mediacorp
- Distributed by: Next Entertainment World
- Release date: April 5, 2018
- Running time: 100 minutes
- Country: South Korea
- Language: Korean
- Box office: US$9.1 million

What a Man Wants (Korean: 바람 바람 바람; RR: Baram baram baram) is a 2018 South Korean romantic comedy film directed by Lee Byeong-heon. It stars Lee Sung-min, Shin Ha-kyun, Song Ji-hyo and Lee El.

== Premise ==
Set against the backdrop of Jeju Island, the film follows four people seeking adventure and finding the loves of their lives.

== Cast ==
- Lee Sung-min as Seok-geun

A womanizer and older brother of Mi-young

- Shin Ha-kyun as Bong-soo

An aspiring chef and submissive husband

- Song Ji-hyo as Mi-young

Bong-soo's wife and Seok-geun's younger sister

- Lee El as Jenny

A woman whom Bong-soo is attracted to

- Jang Young-nam as Dam-deok

Seok-geun's wife

- Go Jun as Hyo-bong

== Production ==
Filming began on March 13, 2017.

== Release ==
The film was released in local cinemas on April 5, 2018.
