= Extreme Job =

2019 film by Lee Byeong-heon

- Theatrical release poster
- Hangul: 극한직업
- RR: Geukhan jigeop
- MR: Kŭkhan chigŏp
- Directed by: Lee Byeong-heon
- Written by: Bae Se-young
- Produced by: Kim Seong-hwan; Lee Jong-suk; Go Dae-suk
- Starring: Ryu Seung-ryong; Lee Hanee; Jin Seon-kyu; Lee Dong-hwi; Gong Myung
- Cinematography: Noh Seung-bo
- Edited by: Nam Na-yeong
- Music by: Kim Tae-seong
- Production companies: About Film; Haegrim Pictures
- Distributed by: CJ Entertainment
- Release date: January 23, 2019
- Running time: 111 minutes
- Country: South Korea
- Language: Korean
- Budget: ₩6.5 billion (US$5.8 million)
- Box office: US$120 million

Extreme Job (Korean: 극한직업) is a 2019 South Korean action comedy film directed by Lee Byeong-heon and written by Bae Se-young. It follows a police narcotics unit that runs a fried chicken restaurant as an undercover front for their investigation. It stars Ryu Seung-ryong, Lee Hanee, Jin Seon-kyu, Lee Dong-hwi and Gong Myung. The film was released on January 23, 2019.

The film became a major box office success in South Korea, grossing ₩91.5 billion (US$81.6 million) on a production budget of ₩6.5 billion (US$5.8 million) and surpassing 10 million ticket sales in just 15 days.

As of June 2022, Extreme Job is the highest-grossing film and the second most viewed film in South Korean film history.

== Plot ==
A group of young narcotics detectives led by squad chief Go are dispatched to apprehend a minor drug trafficker, but are unable to catch him before a foot chase breaks out. The group is made up of detectives Jang, Ma, Young-Ho, and Jae-Hoon under Squad Chief Go. They chase the trafficker into traffic, where he is hit by a bus, causing a large car pileup. For the inability to capture the target and causing massive property damage, the team is reprimanded by their superintendent, who blames their reckless behavior on Go's not being promoted to Captain.

After leaving the station for dinner with the organized crime squad, Squad Chief Choi lets Go know that the crime boss Moo-Bae is coming back to South Korea, and his underling Hong is building a gang in preparation. Choi proposes that the two squads cooperate to bring them down, letting narcotics take credit for the capture of Hong, while they get Moo-Bae. Seeing the chance to save their jobs, they accept.

They carry out an undercover surveillance of an international drug gang. Their stakeout location is a chicken restaurant. Things seem to work, but Go is informed that the restaurant will soon go out of business. Go and his colleagues decide to purchase the restaurant, still planning to use it for their undercover operation.

However, a rib marinade they improvise for a sticky chicken recipe becomes an instant hit, and their chicken restaurant becomes known for its food.

== Cast ==
=== Main ===
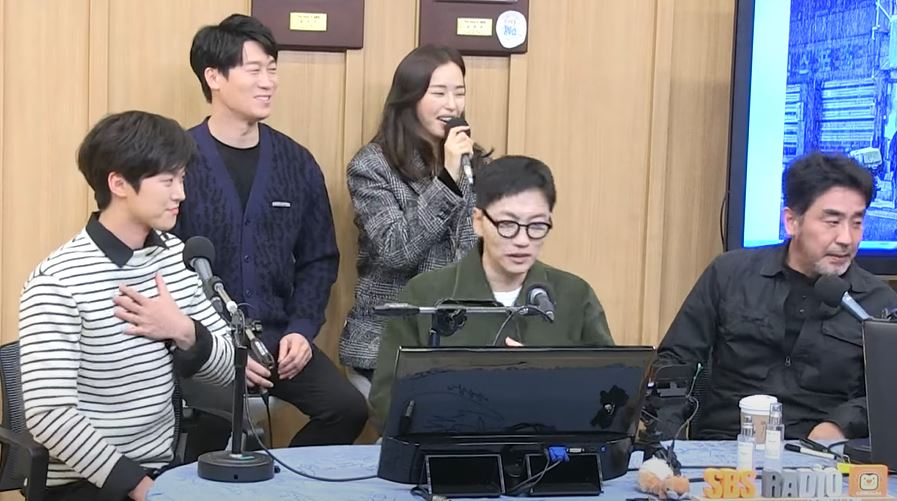
The cast of the movie at SBS Radio

- Ryu Seung-ryong as Squad chief Go

A determined but poorly performing cop. He is a dedicated worker who invests his retirement fund into the fried chicken business. Nicknamed the Zombie as he has survived 12 stab wounds.

- Lee Hanee as Detective Jang

The team's not-always-efficient problem solver. Nicknamed Jang-Bak (from Ong Bak) due to having been a kickboxing (Muay Thai) champion previously. She has a love/hate relationship with Ma.

- Jin Seon-kyu as Detective Ma

A financially unreliable cop with gambling tendencies. The key figure behind the success of the fried chicken restaurant. He uses his parents' rib marinade recipe for exquisite taste. He is a showboater and an overconfident cop. He was a member of the South Korean judo team in the past and has a love/hate relationship with Detective Jang.

- Lee Dong-hwi as Detective Young-ho

The team's determined goal-setter and the most serious member of the team. He was rumored to have been an ex-military and a member of the elite UD team with kills under his belt.

- Gong Myung as Detective Jae-hoon

The enthusiastic, youngest team member and cheerleader. He is extremely gullible and childish. He has extraordinary resilience to blows due to being a high school baseball star and enduring brickbats for years.

=== Supporting ===
- Shin Ha-kyun as Lee Moo-bae
- Oh Jung-se as Ted Chang
- Han Joon-woo as Detective
- Kim Eui-sung as Police superintendent
- Song Young-kyu as Detective squad chief Choi
- Heo Joon-suk as General manager Jung
- Kim Ji-young as Squad chief Go's wife
- Kim Jong-soo as Chicken restaurant owner
- Lee Joong-ok as Hwan-dong
- Jung Jae-kwang as Gungpyeong Port uniformed police
- Yang Hyun-min as Hong Sang-pil
- Shin Shin-ae 3rd floor aunt (special appearance)

== Box office ==
By the second day since the release of the film, it topped the box office by selling 720,000 tickets.

On January 25, 2019, just three days after release, Extreme Job surpassed 1 million viewers. It set a record of exceeding 1 million views in the shortest period of time for a January comedy film in Korea. It has also tied with the 2016 film Luck Key as the fastest comedy film to reach 1 million views.

Soon after, on January 26, 2019, the film reached a total of 2 million moviegoers and broke the record for the fastest comedy film to hit the 2 million mark in just four days. The previous record holders Miracle in Cell No. 7 and Miss Granny took six days to achieve that.

The film continued becoming a box office hit as it reached the 3.1 million mark in five days at a faster rate than previous films that reached 10 million moviegoers such as Veteran and The Thieves which took six days to achieve the 3 million milestones. The film also broke the January daily ticket sales record previously held by Along with the Gods: The Two Worlds with 916,652 admissions on January 1, 2018.

Topping the local box office for nine straight days since its January 23 release, the film surpassed 5 million admissions on February 1, way beyond its 2.3 million tickets break-even point.

Two weeks after its initial release on February 6, the film finally reached a grand domestic total of 10 million admissions, making it the 23rd film to pass the 10 million mark. It also becomes the second comedy film in six years to reach 10 million moviegoers after Miracle in Cell No. 7.

On February 10, just in 19 days, Extreme Job became the highest-grossing Korean comedy film of all time by reaching 12,835,396 moviegoers setting a new record. The previous record was held by Miracle in Cell No. 7 which drew a total of 12,811,206 moviegoers during its run.

According to statistics released by the Korean Film Council on February 18, Extreme Job has set a new record for the second-most-watched film in Korea of all time, coming in at 14,536,378. It is now second place behind The Admiral: Roaring Currents which still reigns on top with 17.61 million moviegoers in total. It has also become the highest-grossing film of all time in South Korea (unadjusted).

It was projected to gross around $100–120 million by the end of its theatrical run.

== Awards and nominations ==
Year	Awards	Category	Recipient	Result	Ref.
2019	55th Baeksang Arts Awards	Best Actor	Ryu Seung-ryong	Nominated	
2019	55th Baeksang Arts Awards	Best Supporting Actor	Jin Seon-kyu	Nominated	
2019	55th Baeksang Arts Awards	Best Supporting Actress	Lee Hanee	Nominated	
2019	55th Baeksang Arts Awards	Best New Actor	Gong Myung	Nominated	
2019	55th Baeksang Arts Awards	Best Screenplay	Bae Se-young	Nominated	
2019	21st Udine Far East Film Festival	Audience Award	Lee Byeong-heon	Won	
2019	24th Chunsa Film Art Awards	Director Award	Lee Byeong-heon	Nominated	
2019	24th Chunsa Film Art Awards	Best Screenplay	Moon Chung-il	Nominated	
2019	24th Chunsa Film Art Awards	Best Actor Award	Ryu Seung-ryong	Nominated	
2019	24th Chunsa Film Art Awards	Best Supporting Actor	Jin Seon-gyu	Nominated	
2019	24th Chunsa Film Art Awards	Rookie of the Year Award	Gong Myung	Won	
2019	24th Chunsa Film Art Awards	Audience Choice Award for Most Popular Film	Extreme Job	Won	
2019	Golden Cinematography Award	Achievement Award	Kim Seong-hwan	Won	
2019	Chungbuk International Martial Arts and Action Film Festival	Box Office of the Year	Kim Mi-hye	Won	
2019	Chungbuk International Martial Arts and Action Film Festival	Rookie Actor of the Year Award	Jang Jin-hee	Won	
2019	28th Buil Film Awards	Best Director Award	Lee Byeong-heon	Nominated	
2019	28th Buil Film Awards	Best Supporting Actor	Jin Seon-kyu	Nominated	
2019	28th Buil Film Awards	Best New Actor	Gong Myung	Nominated	
2019	28th Buil Film Awards	Best Screenplay	Moon Chung-il	Nominated	
2019	39th Korean Association of Film Critics Awards	Best Supporting Actor	Jin Seon-kyu	Won	
2019	39th Korean Association of Film Critics Awards	Youngpyeong Award	Extreme Job	Won	
2019	40th Blue Dragon Film Awards	Best Film	Extreme Job	Nominated	
2019	40th Blue Dragon Film Awards	Best Director	Lee Byeong-heon	Nominated	
2019	40th Blue Dragon Film Awards	Best Leading Actor	Ryu Seung-ryong	Nominated	
2019	40th Blue Dragon Film Awards	Best Supporting Actor	Jin Seon-kyu	Nominated	
2019	40th Blue Dragon Film Awards	Best Supporting Actress	Lee Hanee	Nominated	
2019	40th Blue Dragon Film Awards	Best New Actor	Gong Myung	Nominated	
2019	40th Blue Dragon Film Awards	Best Screenplay	Bae Se-young	Nominated	
2019	40th Blue Dragon Film Awards	Best Editing	Nam Na-yeong	Nominated	
2019	40th Blue Dragon Film Awards	Popular Star Award	Lee Hanee	Won	
2019	40th Blue Dragon Film Awards	Audience Choice Award for Most Popular Film	Extreme Job	Won	
2019	8th Korea Best Star Award	Best Director	Lee Byeong-heon	Won	
2019	8th Korea Best Star Award	Best Actor	Ryu Seung-ryong	Won	
2019	8th Korea Best Star Award	Best New Actor	Gong Myung	Won	
2019	19th Director's Cut Awards	Male Actor of the Year	Ryu Seung-ryong	Nominated	
2019	19th Director's Cut Awards	Screenplay of the Year	Moon Chung-il	Nominated	
2019	19th Director's Cut Awards	Director of the Year	Lee Byeong-heon	Nominated	
2019	6th Korean Film Writers Association Award	Best Editing	Nam Na-yeong	Won	
2020	56th Grand Bell Awards	Best Film	Extreme Job	Nominated	
2020	56th Grand Bell Awards	Best Director	Lee Byeong-heon	Nominated	
2020	56th Grand Bell Awards	Best Supporting Actor	Jin Seon-kyu	Won	
2020	56th Grand Bell Awards	Best Supporting Actress	Lee Hanee	Nominated	
2020	56th Grand Bell Awards	Best New Actor	Gong Myung	Nominated	
2020	56th Grand Bell Awards	Best Screenplay	Bae Se-young	Nominated	
2020	56th Grand Bell Awards	Best Film Editing	Nam Na-yeong	Nominated	
2020	56th Grand Bell Awards	Best Planning	Lee Jong-suk	Won	

== Remakes ==
Extreme Job and Chinese film Lobster Cop (龍蝦刑警, released in June 2018) were developed in the same project called the 'Korean-Chinese story co-development project' that was a cooperation between Chinese and Korean companies, with the same script localized differently in their respective countries.

In April 2019, it was reported that a Hollywood remake was being worked on, starring Kevin Hart.
