= Secret (2009 film) =

- Film poster
- Hangul: 시크릿
- RR: Sikeurit
- MR: Sik'ŭrit
- Directed by: Yoon Jae-goo
- Written by: Yoon Jae-goo
- Produced by: Kwak Joong-hoon; Lee Hyeon-Myeong; Jang Jin-seung
- Starring: Cha Seung-won; Song Yoon-ah; Ryu Seung-ryong
- Cinematography: Lee Seong-je
- Edited by: Shin Min-kyeong
- Music by: Koo Jawan; Mok Young-jin
- Production company: JK Films
- Distributed by: CJ Entertainment
- Release date: 3 December 2009
- Running time: 105 minutes
- Country: South Korea
- Language: Korean
- Box office: US$6,883,251

Secret (Korean: 시크릿) is a 2009 South Korean crime thriller film directed by Yoon Jae-goo, starring Cha Seung-won, Song Yoon-ah and Ryu Seung-ryong.

== Synopsis ==
Kim Seong-yeol is a young Detective in Homicide with the Seoul police. A year earlier, he'd had an affair with his colleague's wife and, slightly drunk on his way back from meeting her, had caused his daughter's death in a car accident. Wracked with guilt but unable to explain what had happened on that day, he is no longer on speaking terms with his wife, Ji-yeon, who obviously blames him for their only child's death. One day, Ji-yeon goes out all dressed up but comes home unexpectedly disheveled and with blood spatters on her blouse but refusing to explain herself. Seong-yeol is called out to investigate the murder of a man with gang connections and is horrified to find trace evidence that hints at his wife's presence at the scene. He assumes that his wife is connected to the murder, and does all he can to keep her from being identified as a suspect. When a mystery man contacts him, claiming to know Ji-yeon is involved and asking for money, the situation is made worse by Ji-yeon refusing to tell him anything at all.

== Cast ==
- Cha Seung-won as Detective Kim Seong-Yeol
- Song Yoon-ah as Yoo Ji-Yeon
- Ryu Seung-ryong as Cho Gwang-Cheol, called Jae-kal ("Jackal")
- Park Won-sang as Detective Choi
- Oh Jung-se as Kyung-Ho
- Kim In-kwon as Seok-Joon
- Lee El as Young-Sook
- Ye Soo-jung as Ji-yeon's mother
- Ham Sung-min as Boy

== Awards ==
- 2010 18th Chunsa Film Art Awards: Best Screenplay (Yoon Jae-goo)
