= All About My Wife =

- Film poster
- Hangul: 내 아내의 모든 것
- RR: Nae anaeui modeun geot
- MR: Nae anaeŭi modŭn kŏt
- Directed by: Min Kyu-dong
- Written by: Heo Sung-hye; Min Kyu-dong
- Based on: Un novio para mi mujer by Pablo Solarz
- Produced by: Park Joon-ho; Min Jin-soo; Lee Yoo-jin
- Starring: Im Soo-jung; Lee Sun-kyun; Ryu Seung-ryong
- Cinematography: Kim Dong-young
- Edited by: Kim Sun-min
- Music by: Lee Jin-hee; Kim Jun-seong
- Production companies: Soo Film; Zip Cinema
- Distributed by: Next Entertainment World; M-Line Distribution
- Release date: May 17, 2012
- Running time: 121 minutes
- Country: South Korea
- Language: Korean
- Box office: US$29.4 million

All About My Wife (Korean: 내 아내의 모든 것) is a 2012 South Korean romantic comedy film directed by Min Kyu-dong, about a timid husband who hires a professional Casanova to seduce his seemingly perfect but fearsome wife, hoping this will make her divorce him. Starring Im Soo-jung, Lee Sun-kyun and Ryu Seung-ryong, the movie was released in theaters on May 17, 2012.

It is a remake of the Argentine film Un novio para mi mujer ("A Boyfriend for My Wife").

== Plot ==
After seven years of marriage, the mild-mannered Doo-hyun (Lee Sun-kyun) is at the end of his rope as Jung-in (Im Soo-jung), his wife, is driving him crazy with her endless nagging and complaining. He can't even bring himself to ask for a divorce because of the fights that will follow. When Doo-hyun's company transfers him out of state, it seems like his dream of getting away is coming true. But to his horror, Jung-in surprises him by moving across the country to be with him. Desperate but too afraid to ask for a divorce, Doo-hyun recruits his next-door neighbor and legendary Casanova Sung-ki (Ryu Seung-ryong) to seduce his wife and make her divorce him first. After scoping her out, Sung-ki is intrigued by the challenge and confidently agrees to seduce Jung-in as his career finale. Meanwhile, to give her something to do, Doo-hyun has already arranged for Jung-in to get a spot on the local radio station, shooting her mouth off about life's injustices. As time goes on, Sung-ki eventually succeeds in grabbing Jung-in's attention, and the two slowly grow closer. But Doo-hyun grows to regret his decision and decides to spy on his wife and her lover. He starts to have feelings for his wife again, and does not want to divorce her anymore. In the meantime Sung-ki falls in love with Jung-in. Doo-hyun asks Sung-ki to stop seducing his wife, but the latter threatens that he would disclose to his wife that Doo-hyun recruited him if he comes in-between them. The rest of the plot is about who wins Jung-in's heart.

== Cast ==
- Im Soo-jung - Yeon Jung-in
- Lee Sun-kyun - Lee Doo-hyun
- Ryu Seung-ryong - Jang Sung-ki
- Lee Kwang-soo - PD Choi, radio host
- Kim Ji-young - Song, radio writer
- Kim Jung-tae - Park Kwang-shik, Doo-hyun's colleague
- Lee Sung-min - Company Director Na, Doo-hyun's boss
- Kim Do-young - Na's wife
- Jung Sung-hwa - newspaper delivery man
- Lee Dal-hyeong - captain at police station
- Park Hee-von - female cop at police station
- Jo Han-cheol - public officer at divorce court
- Nam Myung-ryul - judge at divorce court
- Lee Do-ah - Pyeongchang Company employee
- Kim Sun-ha - waitress at noodle shop

== Box office ==
With 594,195 tickets sold during the opening weekend of May 18 to 20, the film's debut made a splash atop the local box office, putting up a strong fight against Hollywood films The Avengers and Men in Black 3. Benefiting from positive word-of-mouth, it continued its impressive commercial run, with over 4.5 million admissions in total.

== Awards and nominations ==
Year	Award	Category	Recipient	Result	Ref.
2012	21st Buil Film Awards	Best Actress	Im Soo-jung	Nominated	
2012	21st Buil Film Awards	Best Supporting Actor	Ryu Seung-ryong	Nominated	
2012	21st Buil Film Awards	Best Screenplay	Min Kyu-dong, Heo Sung-hye	Nominated	
2012	49th Grand Bell Awards	Best Actress	Im Soo-jung	Nominated	
2012	49th Grand Bell Awards	Best Supporting Actor	Ryu Seung-ryong	Nominated	
2012	33rd Blue Dragon Film Awards	Best Actress	Im Soo-jung	Won	
2012	33rd Blue Dragon Film Awards	Best Supporting Actor	Ryu Seung-ryong	Won	
2012	33rd Blue Dragon Film Awards	Best New Actor	Lee Kwang-soo	Nominated	
2012	33rd Blue Dragon Film Awards	Best Screenplay	Min Kyu-dong, Heo Sung-hye	Nominated	
2012	33rd Blue Dragon Film Awards	Best Art Direction	Jeon Kyung-ran	Nominated	
2012	33rd Blue Dragon Film Awards	Best Music	Kim Jun-seong, Lee Jin-hee	Nominated	
2012	55th Asia-Pacific Film Festival	Best Actress	Im Soo-jung	Nominated	
2012	Women in Film Korea Awards	Best Actress	Im Soo-jung	Won	
2013	4th KOFRA Film Awards	Best Supporting Actor	Ryu Seung-ryong	Won	
2013	49th Baeksang Arts Awards	Best Director	Min Kyu-dong	Nominated	
2013	49th Baeksang Arts Awards	Best Actress	Im Soo-jung	Nominated	
2013	49th Baeksang Arts Awards	Best Supporting Actor	Ryu Seung-ryong	Nominated	
2013	49th Baeksang Arts Awards	Best Screenplay	Min Kyu-dong, Heo Sung-hye	Nominated	
