= Lee Byeong-heon (filmmaker) =

South Korean film director and screenwriter

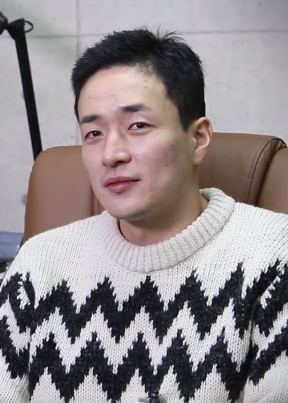
- Lee in 2015
- Born: 23 July 1980 (age 46); South Korea
- Occupation: Filmmaker
- Years active: 2008–present

Korean name
- Hangul: 이병헌
- Hanja: 李炳憲
- RR: I Byeongheon
- MR: I Pyŏnghŏn

Lee Byeong-heon (Korean: 이병헌; born 23 July 1980) is a South Korean film director and screenwriter. He is best known for his 2015 film Twenty and 2019 film Extreme Job, the latter of which broke the record for the highest-grossing South Korean film.

== Filmography ==
=== Film ===
Year	Film	Credited as			Notes
Year	Film	Director	Writer	Producer	Notes
2008	Scandal Makers	No	Adaptation	No	
2009	Smell	Yes	No	No	
2011	Sunny	No	Adaptation	No	
2012	Cheer Up Mr. Lee	Yes	Yes	Yes	
2012	Never Ending Story	No	Yes	No	
2014	Tazza: The Hidden Card	No	Adaptation	No	
2015	Love Forecast	No	Yes	No	
2015	Twenty	Yes	Yes	No	
2018	What a Man Wants	Yes	Adaptation	No	
2019	Extreme Job	Yes	No	No	
2023	Dream	Yes	Yes	No	
2023	Honey Sweet	No	Yes	No	

=== Television series ===
Television series
Year	Film	Credited as		Notes
Year	Film	Director	Writer	Notes
2019	Be Melodramatic	Yes	Yes	

=== Web series ===
Web series
Year	Title		Credited as		Notes
Year	English	Korean	Director	Writer	Notes
2013	Peckish Women	출출한 여자 - 2화 금기의 맛	Yes	Yes	web series
2016	Be Positive	긍정이 체질	Yes	Yes	Naver TV Series; Aired at JTBC2 in 2017
2022	Alice, the Ultimate Weapon	최종병기 앨리스	Yes	No	Watcha original drama
2024	Chicken Nugget	닭강정	Yes	Yes	Netflix series

== Awards and nominations ==
Year	Award	Category	Nominated work	Result
2012	38th Seoul Independent Film Festival	Audience Award	Smell	Nominated
2013	50th Grand Bell Awards	Best New Director	Cheer Up Mr. Lee	Nominated
2015	51st Baeksang Arts Awards	Best New Director (Film)	Twenty	Nominated
2015	52nd Grand Bell Awards	Best New Director	Twenty	Nominated
2015	36th Blue Dragon Film Awards	Best New Director	Twenty	Nominated
2015	The Korea Film Actors Association Awards	Best New Director Award	Twenty	Won
2019	21st Udine Far East Film Festival	Audience Award	Extreme Job	Won
2019	24th Chunsa Film Art Awards	Director Award	Extreme Job	Nominated
2019	8th Buil Film Awards	Best Director	Extreme Job	Nominated
2019	40th Blue Dragon Film Awards	Best Director	Extreme Job	Nominated
2019	8th Korea Best Star Award	Best Director	Extreme Job	Won
2019	19th Director's Cut Awards	Director of the Year	Extreme Job	Nominated
2020	56th Grand Bell Awards	Best Director	Extreme Job	Nominated
