= War of the Arrows =

2011 South Korean period action film

- Theatrical release poster
- Hangul: 최종병기 활
- Hanja: 最終兵器 활
- RR: Choejongbyeonggi hwal
- MR: Ch'oejongbyŏnggi hwal
- Directed by: Kim Han-min
- Written by: Kim Han-min
- Produced by: Jang Won-seok; Kim Sung-hwan
- Starring: Park Hae-il; Ryu Seung-ryong; Moon Chae-won; Kim Mu-yeol
- Cinematography: Kim Tae-seong; Park Jong-chul
- Edited by: Kim Chang-ju; Steve M. Choe; Heo Sun-mi
- Music by: Kim Tae-seong
- Distributed by: Lotte Entertainment
- Release date: August 11, 2011
- Running time: 122 minutes
- Country: South Korea
- Languages: Korean; Manchu
- Box office: US$51.4 million US$79,578 (director's cut version)

War of the Arrows (Korean: 최종병기 활), alternately titled Arrow: The Ultimate Weapon, is a 2011 South Korean historical action film starring Park Hae-il, Ryu Seung-ryong, and Moon Chae-won. Set after the Qing invasion of Joseon, the film is about an archer who risks his life to save his sister from slavery under Qing-Prince Dorgon's rule.

Praised by critics for its fast pacing and combat sequences, the film drew an audience of 7.48 million, making it the highest grossing Korean film of 2011. It was also honored at the 48th Grand Bell Awards and the 32nd Blue Dragon Film Awards, including Best Actor for Park, Best Supporting Actor for Ryu, and Best New Actress for Moon. The film is also notable for the rare use of the Manchu language in some of its dialogue, and the demonstrative use of archery techniques, including a tongah arrow guide.

== Plot ==
The film begins with two children, Nam-yi and his younger sister Ja-in, being chased by King Injo's guards and saved by their father Choi Pyeong-ryung, an officer of King Gwanghae and a skilled archer. He sends his children to find a place of refuge with his best friend Kim Mu-seon. As they escape, Ja-in begs her brother to go back to their father, but Choi Pyeong-ryung is killed in front of Nam-yi. Nam-yi, though bitten by the guard dogs, kills them and escapes with Ja-in.

13 years later, Nam-yi (Park Hae-il) has become a skilled archer and hunter with his companions Gang-du, Gab-yong, and Seo-goon, Mu-seon's son. He learns from Seo-goon (Kim Mu-yeol) that he and Ja-in (Moon Chae-won) plan to get married, with the approval of Mu-seon, who is also Ja-in's godfather. During the wedding, Nam-yi is up in the mountains hunting deer when he hears the rumble of invading Manchu forces. When Nam-yi makes it back to the village, he finds his foster father slaughtered and his sister taken away. Nam-yi then sets out to find the Qing army and rescue his sister, who was taken directly to the camp of Manchu prince Dorgon (Park Ki-woong). After he ambushes a scouting party to gain information, the Qing royal guard, led by army commander Jyuushinta (Ryu Seung-ryong), sets out to find Nam-yi.

Before being taken into Manchuria, the prisoners, led by Seo-goon, rebel, with Nam-yi arriving in the nick of time to assist them. Nam-yi, Seo-goon, Gang-du, and Gab-yong seek out the Manchu camp, finding it well guarded and Ja-in still alive. Nam-yi captures the Manchu prince, douses him with alcohol, and holds him hostage until sun rise so his sister and Seo-goon can escape, promising to meet them at a hut. He then sets the prince and his tent on fire, sowing chaos in the camp. Jyuushinta arrives at the camp at daybreak to find the prince dead, and sets out to find Nam-yi. Gang-du and Gab-yong both sacrifice themselves to buy Nam-yi time to get away. At a gorge, Nam-yi leaps across and is pinned down by the Manchu. As they cross, he is able to kill three of them but misses the chance to kill Jyuushinta.

At the rendezvous hut, two Manchu ambush Seo-goon and Ja-in but are killed. On the other side of the gorge, Nam-yi gets shot in the arm, but is able to lure a tiger into attacking the Manchu and elude them again. After gaining a lead, he prepares a final ambush and kills two of his remaining four pursuers. Finally, predicting where Jyuushinta is placed, he bends the trajectory of his last arrow, but Jyuushinta is saved by his last serviceman, who takes the fatal shot in his stead.

Nam-yi rides away to find Ja-in, as he assumes that Jyuushinta is dead. They are about to reunite when Ja-in sees Jyuushinta aiming at Nam-yi from a cliff; but before the arrow hits, Ja-in shoots the horse and Nam-yi falls. As Nam-yi and Jyuushinta face off, Ja-in runs in between them. Nam-yi's arrow barely touches Ja-in's dress, but Jyuushinta's finds its mark and sinks into Nam-yi's heart. Despite Ja-in's protests, Nam-yi pulls it out and fatally shoots Jyuushinta with it. As he lies dying in Ja-in's lap, Nam-yi says that they should go back to their old home in Hanyang. Ja-in lays Nam-yi into a boat, and she and Seo-goon cross back over the river into their homeland.

== Cast ==
- Park Hae-il as Choi Nam-yi
  - Lee David as young Nam-yi
- Ryu Seung-ryong as Jyuushinta
- Moon Chae-won as Choi Ja-in
  - Jeon Min-seo as young Ja-in
- Kim Mu-yeol as Kim Seo-goon
- Park Ki-woong as Dorgon, Prince of Qing Manchu-China
- Ryohei Otani as Nogami
- Kim Ku-taek as Gang-du
- Lee Han-wi as Gab-yong
- Lee Geung-young as Kim Mu-seon
- Kang Eun-jin as Eun-yi
- Lee Seung-joon as Wan-han
- Lee Jae-gu as Hoo-man
- Park No-shik as Jang-soon
- Yoon Dong-hwan as Choi Pyeong-ryung
- Jo Woo-jin as Qing messenger
- Lee Ji-hyun as Gisaeng

=== English dubbed cast ===
- Travis Willingham as Choi Nam-yi (voice)
- Alexis Tipton as Choi Ja-in (voice)
- Mirra Capper as Ja-in as a small girl (voice)

== Reception ==
On the review aggregator website Rotten Tomatoes, 100% of 5 critics' reviews are positive.

== Awards and nominations ==
| Year | Award | Category | Recipient | Result |
|---|---|---|---|---|
| 2011 | 48th Grand Bell Awards | Best Film | War of the Arrows | Nominated |
| 2011 | 48th Grand Bell Awards | Best Actor | Park Hae-il | Won |
| 2011 | 48th Grand Bell Awards | Best New Actress | Moon Chae-won | Won |
| 2011 | 48th Grand Bell Awards | Best Cinematography | Kim Tae-seong, Park Jong-chul | Nominated |
| 2011 | 48th Grand Bell Awards | Best Art Direction | Jang Chun-seop | Nominated |
| 2011 | 48th Grand Bell Awards | Best Costume Design | Kwon Yu-jin | Nominated |
| 2011 | 48th Grand Bell Awards | Best Visual Effects | Han Young-woo | Won |
| 2011 | 48th Grand Bell Awards | Best Sound Effects | Choi Tae-young | Won |
| 2011 | 31st Korean Association of Film Critics Awards | Best Cinematography | Kim Tae-seong, Park Jong-chul | Won |
| 2011 | 31st Korean Association of Film Critics Awards | Best Visual Effects | Han Young-woo | Won |
| 2011 | 32nd Blue Dragon Film Awards | Best Film | War of the Arrows | Nominated |
| 2011 | 32nd Blue Dragon Film Awards | Best Director | Kim Han-min | Nominated |
| 2011 | 32nd Blue Dragon Film Awards | Best Actor | Park Hae-il | Won |
| 2011 | 32nd Blue Dragon Film Awards | Best Supporting Actor | Ryu Seung-ryong | Won |
| 2011 | 32nd Blue Dragon Film Awards | Best New Actress | Moon Chae-won | Won |
| 2011 | 32nd Blue Dragon Film Awards | Best Cinematography | Kim Tae-seong | Nominated |
| 2011 | 32nd Blue Dragon Film Awards | Best Art Direction | Jang Chun-seop | Nominated |
| 2011 | 32nd Blue Dragon Film Awards | Best Lighting | Kim Gyeong-seok | Nominated |
| 2011 | 32nd Blue Dragon Film Awards | Best Music | Kim Tae-seong | Nominated |
| 2011 | 32nd Blue Dragon Film Awards | Technical Award | Oh Se-young | Won |
| 2011 | 32nd Blue Dragon Film Awards | Audience Choice Award for Most Popular Film | War of the Arrows | Won |
| 2011 | 19th Korean Culture and Entertainment Awards | Grand Prize ("Daesang") for Film | Park Hae-il | Won |
| 2011 | 19th Korean Culture and Entertainment Awards | Top Excellence Award, Actor in a Film | Ryu Seung-ryong | Won |
| 2011 | 19th Korean Culture and Entertainment Awards | Excellence Award, Actress in a Film | Moon Chae-won | Won |
| 2012 | 6th Asian Film Awards | Best Actor | Park Hae-il | Nominated |
| 2012 | 6th Asian Film Awards | People's Choice Award for Favorite Actor | Park Hae-il | Nominated |
| 2012 | 48th Baeksang Arts Awards | Best Actor | Park Hae-il | Nominated |
