= Busco novio para mi mujer =

- Directed by: Enrique Begne
- Written by: Enrique Begne; Leticia López Margalli; Gabriel Ripstein
- Based on: Un novio para mi mujer by Pablo Solarz
- Produced by: Sandra Echeverría; Laura Imperiale; Inna Payán
- Starring: Sandra Echeverría; Arath de la Torre; Jesús Ochoa Como; Mauricio Isaac; Mónica Huarte; Yago Muñoz
- Cinematography: Javier Zarco
- Edited by: Santiago Torre
- Music by: Joan Valent
- Production companies: Animal de Luz Films; Azucar Films; Cacerola Films
- Distributed by: Pantelion Films (US)
- Release date: 12 February 2016
- Running time: 92 minutes
- Country: Mexico
- Language: Spanish
- Box office: $1.1 million (Mexico)

Busco novio para mi mujer is a 2016 Mexican romantic comedy film directed by Enrique Begne and co-written by Begne, Leticia López Margalli, and Gabriel Ripstein based on Pablo Solarz's 2008 Argentine film Un novio para mi mujer.

== Plot ==
Fed up with his nagging and nitpicking wife Dana, Paco devises a plan to end his marriage: he hires professional womanizer/seducer "El Taiger" to sweep his wife off her feet.

== Cast ==
- Arath de la Torre as Paco
- Sandra Echeverría as Dana
- Jesús Ochoa as El Taiger
- Alejandro Cuétara as Gabriel

== Release ==
Busco novio para mi mujer opened theatrically in Mexico on 12 February 2016, and in the United States on 19 February 2016.

=== Box office ===
The film earned $1,133,078 in its opening weekend, ranking second behind Deadpool ($7,141,097).

=== Critical reception ===
The film received positive reviews from critics. On Rotten Tomatoes, the film has an 78% score based on 9 reviews, with an average rating of 4.75/10.
