= A Boyfriend for My Wife =

- Theatrical release poster
- Spanish: Un novio para mi mujer
- Directed by: Juan Taratuto
- Written by: Pablo Solarz
- Starring: Adrián Suar; Valeria Bertuccelli; Gabriel Goity
- Edited by: Pablo Barbieri Carrera
- Music by: Iván Wyszogrod
- Production company: Patagonik Film Group
- Distributed by: Buena Vista International
- Release date: 14 August 2008
- Running time: 107 minutes
- Country: Argentina
- Language: Spanish

A Boyfriend for My Wife (Spanish: Un Novio Para Mi Mujer) is a 2008 Argentine romantic comedy film directed by Juan Taratuto and starring Adrián Suar, Valeria Bertuccelli, and Gabriel Goity.

It was the highest grossing Argentine film in 2008. In 2009, Warner Bros. bought the rights of the film. A South Korean remake directed by Min Kyu-dong, All About My Wife, was released in 2012. Pantelion Films released a Mexican remake called Busco novio para mi mujer in 2016. Patagonik (Argentina) and Picardía Films released a Chilean remake called Se busca novio... para mi mujer in 2017. An Italian remake was also released, titled Un fidanzato per mia moglie, in 2014. An Indian Tamil-language version with the roles reversed, Hey Sinamika, was released in 2022, with dubbed versions in other Indian languages.

== Plot ==
The film is about "Tenso" (Suar), a timid husband who is fed up with his wife "Tana" (Bertuccelli) who dislikes and complains about everything. He hires "Cuervo" Flores (Goity), a professional Casanova to seduce Tana, hoping this will make her divorce him. To aid with that seduction, Tenso gets Tana a job at a local radio station where her morning talk show complaining about what she dislikes becomes popular. Cuervo proceeds to try to seduce Tana and professes to Tenso that he has fallen in love with Tana. Tenso confesses to Tana that he had set up the seduction, and she confesses that she has been seduced by the radio station manager. Tenso and Tana proceed with a divorce, but reconcile before the divorce can be finalized.

== Cast ==
- Adrián Suar as Diego "Tenso" Polski
- Valeria Bertuccelli as Andrea "Tana" Ferro
- Gabriel Goity as "Cuervo" Flores
- Marcelo Xicarte as Carlos, "Tenso"'s friend
- Luis Herrera as "Negro", "Tenso"'s friend
- Martín Salazar as Gabriel, "Tenso"'s friend
- Oscar Núñez as Amílcar, an employee of the football club "Tenso" and his friends play at and "Cuervo"'s former mentor
- Benjamín Amadeo as Damián Kepelsky, a local radio station's host and "Tana"'s boss
- Mercedes Morán as the voice of Blanca, a couples therapist
- Julieta Zylberberg as María, a receptionist at Kepelsky's radio station
- Violeta Urtizberea as Paola, Carlos' younger wife
- Lucía Maciel as Lorena, Paola's sister
- Daniel Casablanca as Marito

== Remakes ==
Year	Film	Language	Director
2012	All About My Wife	Korean	Min Kyu-dong
2014	Un fidanzato per mia moglie	Italian	Davide Marengo
2015	Isteri Untuk Dijual	Malay	Eyra Rahman
2016	Busco novio para mi mujer	Mexican Spanish	Enrique Begne
2017	Se busca novio... para mi mujer	Chilean Spanish	Diego Rougier
2018	Kế hoạch đổi chồng	Vietnamese	Trần Nhân Kiên
2022	Hey Sinamika	Tamil	Brinda (choreographer)
2025	Everything About My Wife	Tagalog	Real Florido
