= List of 2024 box office number-one films in South Korea =

The following is a list of 2024 box office number-one films in South Korea by weekend. When the number-one film in gross is not the same as the number-one film in admissions, both are listed.

== Number-one films ==
†	This implies the highest-grossing movie of the year.

#	Date	Film	Weekend gross	Admissions	Ref.
1	January 7, 2024	Wish	$3,290,407	441,950	
2	January 14, 2024	Alienoid: Return to the Future	$3,572,733	480,241	
3	January 21, 2024	Alienoid: Return to the Future	$2,048,888	277,619	
4	January 28, 2024	Citizen of a Kind	$2,590,981	363,077	
5	February 4, 2024	Wonka	$3,972,251	526,708	
6	February 11, 2024	Wonka	$3,882,376	522,183	
7	February 18, 2024	Wonka	$3,224,593	442,708	
8	February 25, 2024	Exhuma †	$14,455,880	1,963,577	
9	March 3, 2024	Exhuma †	$17,223,570	2,335,947	
10	March 10, 2024	Exhuma †	$9,575,300	1,275,219	
11	March 17, 2024	Exhuma †	$5,796,994	780,915	
12	March 24, 2024	Exhuma †	$4,580,266	618,055	
13	March 31, 2024	Exhuma †	$3,007,121	417,995	
14	April 7, 2024	Exhuma †	$1,563,422	216,776	
15	April 14, 2024	Kung Fu Panda 4	$2,821,258	408,570	
16	April 21, 2024	Kung Fu Panda 4	$1,903,513	282,377	
17	April 28, 2024	The Roundup: Punishment	$20,858,786	2,918,560	
18	May 5, 2024	The Roundup: Punishment	$13,787,140	1,922,362	
19	May 12, 2024	The Roundup: Punishment	$5,539,944	777,324	
20	May 19, 2024	The Roundup: Punishment	$3,042,384	418,746	
21	May 26, 2024	Furiosa: A Mad Max Saga	$3,351,006	429,320	
22	June 2, 2024	Furiosa: A Mad Max Saga	$2,255,692	298,686	
23	June 9, 2024	Wonderland	$1,659,882	237,797	
24	June 16, 2024	Inside Out 2	$12,361,675	1,750,424	
25	June 23, 2024	Inside Out 2	$10,411,087	1,477,688	
26	June 30, 2024	Inside Out 2	$7,112,439	1,013,709	
27	July 7, 2024	Inside Out 2	$6,324,064	906,346	
28	July 14, 2024	Inside Out 2	$3,507,276	502,776	
29	July 21, 2024	Escape	$2,648,069	372,295	
30	July 28, 2024	Deadpool & Wolverine	$5,545,676	722,569	
31	August 4, 2024	Pilot	$7,582,117	1,095,445	
32	August 11, 2024	Pilot	$5,133,710	723,224	
33	August 18, 2024	Alien: Romulus	$3,466,650	441,213	
34	August 25, 2024	Alien: Romulus	$2,657,469	342,438	
35	September 1, 2024	Alien: Romulus	$1,652,737	223,216	
36	September 8, 2024	Alien: Romulus	$902,322	119,364	
37	September 15, 2024	I, the Executioner	$15,043,114	2,077,375	
38	September 22, 2024	I, the Executioner	$6,784,582	914,496	
39	September 29, 2024	I, the Executioner	$3,041,258	413,689	
40	October 6, 2024	I, the Executioner	$1,619,481	226,125	
41	October 13, 2024	I, the Executioner	$1,073,231	145,970	
42	October 20, 2024	A Normal Family	$1,422,255	206,898	
43	October 27, 2024	Venom: The Last Dance	$4,206,807	584,454	
44	November 3, 2024	Venom: The Last Dance	$2,186,514	305,975	
45	November 10, 2024	Hear Me: Our Summer	$1,173,108	168,546	
46	November 17, 2024	Gladiator II	$2,308,994	318,546	
47	November 24, 2024	Wicked	$3,591,512	500,674	
48	December 1, 2024	Moana 2	$7,080,839	1,071,019	
49	December 8, 2024	Moana 2	$4,001,734	610,389	
50	December 15, 2024	Firefighters	$4,333,219	657,121	
51	December 22, 2024	Firefighters	$3,373,881	510,973	
52	December 29, 2024	Harbin	$5,988,626	903,860	

== Highest-grossing films ==
International film South Korean film

Highest-grossing films of 2024 (In year release)
Rank	Title	Distributor	Domestic gross
1	Exhuma	Showbox	$86,188,981
2	The Roundup: Punishment	ABO Entertainment	$82,364,087
3	Inside Out 2	Walt Disney	$64,716,939
4	I, the Executioner	CJ Entertainment	$47,349,201
5	Pilot	Lotte Entertainment	$32,187,575
6	Wonka	Warner Bros. Pictures	$25,418,279
7	Moana 2	Walt Disney	$21,144,400
8	Firefighters	By4m Studio	$21,172,448
9	Harbin	CJ Entertainment	$17,834,854
10	Escape	Plus M Entertainment	$16,469,491

== See also ==
- List of South Korean films of 2024
- List of 2023 box office number-one films in South Korea
- 2024 in South Korea
