= Ma Dong-seok filmography =

Filmography of South Korean and American actor

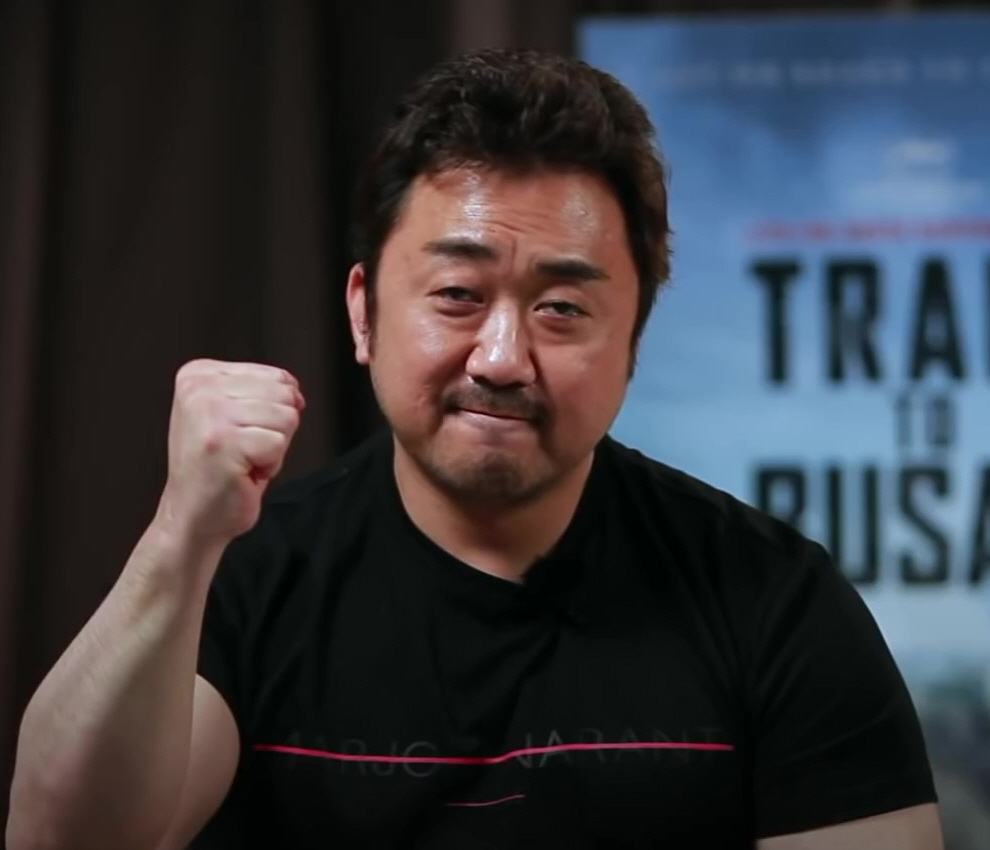
- Ma Dong-seok in 2016
- Film: 64
- Television series: 11
- Music videos: 1

Ma Dong-seok (Korean: 마동석, born March 1, 1971) is a South Korean and American actor. He is also known as Don Lee.

== Film ==
Year	Title	Role	Notes	Ref.
2004	Dance with the Wind	Tteokbokki's younger brother		
2005	Heaven's Soldiers	Hwang Sang-wook		
2006	Ssunday Seoul	Detective 1		
2007	H.I.T.	Nam Seong-shik		
2007	The Worst Guy Ever	Ho-seob		
2008	The Moonlight of Seoul	Chang-woo		
2008	The Good, the Bad, the Weird	Gom ("Bear")		
2008	Ten Ten	Fund manager	Segment: "The Rabbit"	
2009	Insadong Scandal	Sang-bok		
2009	Take Off		Cameo	
2010	Midnight FM	Son Deok-tae		
2010	The Unjust	Ma Dae-ho		
2010	Try to Remember	Seung-hwan		
2011	Quick	Kim Joo-chul		
2011	Pained	Bum-no		
2011	Perfect Game	Park Man-soo		
2011	Showtime!		Short film	
2012	Never Ending Story	Tow car driver	Cameo	
2012	Dancing Queen	Choi Seon-ho	Cameo	
2012	Nameless Gangster: Rules of the Time	Pimp Kim		
2012	Doomsday Book	Zombie in school uniform	Segment: "A Brave New World"	
2012	The Neighbor	Ahn Hyuk-mo		
2012	Love 911	Fire station captain		
2013	New World	Section chief Jo	Cameo	
2013	Norigae	Lee Jang-ho		
2013	Azooma	Detective Ma		
2013	Rockin' on Heaven's Door	Moo-sung		
2013	Mr. Go	Baseball commentator	Cameo	
2013	The Flu	Jeon Gook-hwan		
2013	Marriage Blue	Geon-ho		
2013	Rough Play	"Tenacious" gang boss	Cameo	
2013	Fasten Your Seatbelt	Haneda Airport Staff	Cameo	
2013	The Five	Jang Dae-ho		
2014	Murderer	Joo-hyub		
2014	One on One	Leader of Shadow		
2014	Kundo: Age of the Rampant	Chun-bo		
2014	The Royal Tailor	Pan-soo		
2015	The Chronicles of Evil	Detective Oh		
2015	Veteran	Big guy with sportswear	Cameo	
2015	Deep Trap	Park Sung-chul		
2016	Familyhood	Pyeong-gu		
2016	Train to Busan	Sang-hwa		
2016	Derailed	Hyung-Seok		
2017	The Mayor	Priest	Cameo	
2017	The Outlaws	Ma Seok-do		
2017	The Bros	Lee Seok-bong		
2017	Along With the Gods: The Two Worlds	God of House	Special appearance	
2018	Champion	Mark		
2018	Along with the Gods: The Last 49 Days	God of House		
2018	The Soul-Mate	Jang-su		
2018	The Villagers	Yeok Gi-cheol		
2018	Unstoppable	Kang Dong-chul		
2019	The Gangster, The Cop, The Devil	Jang Dong-soo		
2019	Long Live the King	Gwangju Brown Bear	Special appearance	
2019	The Bad Guys: Reign of Chaos	Park Woong-cheol		
2019	Start-Up	Geo-seok		
2019	Ashfall	Kang Bong-rae		
2021	Ground Zero	Ma Kang-jae	Short film	
2021	Eternals	Gilgamesh	Hollywood debut (Also dubs himself in the Korean version)	
2022	The Roundup	Ma Seok-do	Also producer	
2022	Men of Plastic	Dae Gook	Also producer	
2023	The Roundup: No Way Out	Ma Seok-do	Also producer	
2024	Badland Hunters	Nam-san	Also producer	
2024	The Roundup: Punishment	Ma Seok-do	Also producer	
2025	Holy Night: Demon Hunters	Bau	Also producer	
2026	Street Fighter	Gouken		
TBA	Tygo	Tygo	Also producer	
TBA	The Roundup 5	Ma Seok-do		
TBA	Extraction 3	Tygo		

== Television ==
=== As actor ===
Year	Title	Role	Notes
2007	H.I.T	Nam Seong-shik	
2008	Robber	Jong-goo	
2008	Tazza	Pincers	
2008	Formidable Rivals	Pyo Chul-ho	
2008	Alibi Inc.	Park Sang-bak	
2009	Swallow the Sun	Lee Kang-rae	
2010	Dr. Champ	Oh Jung-dae	
2011	Me Too, Flower!	Detective	(cameo)
2012	Flower Band	Teacher Silva	
2014	Bad Guys	Park Woong-cheol	
2015	Sense8	Club Bodyguard	
2016	Squad 38	Baek Sung-il	
2016	Tong Memories	Hwang Tae-yeol's elder brother	(cameo)
2025	Twelve	Taesan	
TBA	HYBE		

=== As creator ===
Year	Title
2006	I Not Stupid Too
2020	Team Bulldog: Off-Duty Investigation

== Video games ==
Year	Title	Role	Notes
2025	Death Stranding 2: On the Beach	Samson Hook	
TBA	Physint	TBA	
TBA	Gang of Dragon	Shin Ji-Seong	

== Music video appearances ==
Year	Song title	Artist
2007	"A Man"	Monday Kiz
