= List of South Korean films of 2024 =

The following is a list of South Korean films released in 2024.

== Box office ==
The highest-grossing South Korean films released in 2024, by domestic box office gross revenue, are as follows:

Highest-grossing films released in 2024
Rank	Title	Distributor	Domestic gross
1	Exhuma	Showbox	$83,140,371
2	The Roundup: Punishment	ABO Entertainment	$79,450,123
3	I, the Executioner	CJ Entertainment	$52,307,355
4	Harbin	CJ Entertainment	$32,170,324
5	Pilot	Lotte Cultureworks	$31,186,022
6	The Firefighters	By4M Studio	$25,071,837
7	Escape	Megabox Plus M	$17,494,704
8	Hijack 1971	Sony Pictures Entertainment Korea	$12,160,822
9	Handsome Guys	Next Entertainment World	$11,976,956
10	Citizen of a Kind	Showbox	$11,676,947

== Released ==
=== January–March ===
Opening		English title	Native title	Director(s)	Cast	Ref.
J A N U A R Y	10	Alienoid: Return to the Future	외계+인 2부	Choi Dong-hoon	Ryu Jun-yeol, Kim Tae-ri, Kim Woo-bin	
J A N U A R Y	24	Citizen of a Kind	시민덕희	Park Young-joo	Ra Mi-ran, Gong Myung, Yeom Hye-ran, Park Byung-eun, Jang Yoon-ju, Ahn Eun-jin	
J A N U A R Y	24	Ms. Apocalypse	세기말의 사랑	Lim Seon-ae	Lee Yoo-young, Im Seon-woo, Noh Jae-won	
J A N U A R Y	26	Badland Hunters	황야	Heo Myung-haeng	Ma Dong-seok, Lee Hee-joon, Lee Jun-young, Roh Jeong-eui	
F E B R U A R Y	1	The Birth of Korea	건국전쟁	Kim Deok-young	Syngman Rhee	
F E B R U A R Y	7	Dead Man	데드맨	Ha Jun-won	Cho Jin-woong, Kim Hee-ae, Lee Soo-kyung	
F E B R U A R Y	7	Dog Days	도그데이즈	Kim Deok-min	Youn Yuh-jung, Yoo Hae-jin, Kim Yun-jin, Jung Sung-hwa, Kim Seo-hyung, Daniel Henney	
F E B R U A R Y	7	Picnic	소풍	Kim Yong-gyun	Na Moon-hee, Kim Young-ok, Park Geun-hyung	
F E B R U A R Y	22	Exhuma	파묘	Jang Jae-hyun	Choi Min-sik, Kim Go-eun, Yoo Hae-jin, Lee Do-hyun	
M A R C H	1	My Name Is Loh Kiwan	로기완	Kim Hee-jin	Song Joong-ki, Choi Sung-eun, Jo Han-chul, Kim Sung-ryung, Lee Il-hwa	
M A R C H	13	Dolphin	돌핀	Bae Du-ri	Kwon Yu-ri, Gil Hae-yeon	
M A R C H	27	Troll Factory	댓글부대	Ahn Gooc-jin	Son Suk-ku, Kim Sung-cheol, Kim Dong-hwi, Hong Kyung	

=== April–June ===
Opening		English title	Native title	Director(s)	Cast	Ref.
A P R I L	3	Yumi's Cells: The Movie (Note: Animated film)	유미의 세포들 더 무비	Kim Da-hee	Yoon Ah-young, Shin Beom-sik	
A P R I L	10	Again 1997	죽어도 다시 한번	Shin Seung-hoon	Jo Byeong-kyu, Han Eun-soo, Koo Jun-hoe, Han Seo-joon, Choi Hui-seung	
A P R I L	24	A Traveler's Needs	여행자의 필요	Hong Sang-soo	Isabelle Huppert, Lee Hye-young, Kwon Hae-hyo	
A P R I L	24	The Roundup: Punishment	범죄도시4	Heo Myung-haeng	Ma Dong-seok, Kim Mu-yeol, Park Ji-hwan, Lee Dong-hwi	
M A Y	15	Following	그녀가 죽었다	Kim Se-hwi	Byun Yo-han, Shin Hye-sun, Lee El	
M A Y	29	The Plot	설계자	Lee Yo-seob	Gang Dong-won	
J U N E	5	Wonderland	원더랜드	Kim Tae-yong	Tang Wei, Bae Suzy, Park Bo-gum, Jung Yu-mi, Choi Woo-shik	
J U N E	12	Drive	드라이브	Park Dong-hee	Park Ju-hyun, Kim Yeo-jin, Kim Do-yoon, Jung Woong-in	
J U N E	19	Cabriolet	카브리올레	Cho Kwang-jin	Keum Sae-rok, Ryu Kyung-soo, Kang Young-seok	
J U N E	19	The Daechi Scandal	대치동 스캔들	Kim Soo-in	Ahn So-hee, Park Sang-nam, Takuya Terada, Jo Eun-yoo, Oh Tae-kyung	
J U N E	21	Hijack 1971	하이재킹	Kim Seong-han	Ha Jung-woo, Yeo Jin-goo, Sung Dong-il, Chae Soo-bin	
J U N E	26	Handsome Guys	핸섬가이즈	Nam Dong-hyeop	Lee Sung-min, Lee Hee-joon, Gong Seung-yeon, Park Ji-hwan, Lee Kyu-hyung	

=== July–September ===
Opening		English title	Native title	Director(s)	Cast	Ref.
J U L Y	3	Escape	탈주	Lee Jong-pil	Lee Je-hoon, Koo Kyo-hwan, Hong Xa-bin	
J U L Y	12	Project Silence	탈출: 프로젝트 사일런스	Kim Tae-gon	Lee Sun-kyun, Ju Ji-hoon, Kim Hee-won	
J U L Y	31	Pilot	파일럿	Kim Han-gyeol	Jo Jung-suk, Lee Ju-myoung, Han Sun-hwa, Shin Seung-ho	
A U G U S T	7	Revolver	리볼버	Oh Seung-uk	Jeon Do-yeon, Ji Chang-wook, Lim Ji-yeon	
A U G U S T	9	Mission: Cross	크로스	Lee Myeong-hun	Hwang Jung-min, Yum Jung-ah, Jeon Hye-jin	
A U G U S T	14	Land of Happiness	행복의 나라	Choo Chang-min	Jo Jung-suk, Lee Sun-kyun, Yoo Jae-myung	
A U G U S T	14	The Haunted House Special: Red Eyed Reaper	신비아파트 특별편: 붉은 눈의 사신	Park Hong-geun	Kim Young-eun, Kim Chae-ha, Shin Yong-woo, Jo Hyeon-jeong	
A U G U S T	14	Victory	빅토리	Park Bum-soo	Lee Hye-ri, Park Se-wan, Lee Jung-ha, Jo Ah-ram	
A U G U S T	21	Spring Garden	늘봄가든	Koo Tae-jin	Jo Yoon-hee, Kim Joo-ryoung	
A U G U S T	21	The Desperate Chase	필사의 추격	Kim Jae-hoon	Park Sung-woong, Kwak Si-yang, Yoon Kyung-ho	
A U G U S T	28	Because I Hate Korea	한국이 싫어서	Jang Kun-jae	Go Ah-sung, Joo Jong-hyuk, Kim Woo-kyum	
S E P T E M B E R	13	I, the Executioner	베테랑2	Ryoo Seung-wan	Hwang Jung-min, Jung Hae-in	
S E P T E M B E R	13	Officer Black Belt	무도실무관	Jason Kim	Kim Woo-bin, Kim Sung-kyun	
S E P T E M B E R	18	By the Stream	수유천	Hong Sang-soo	Kim Min-hee, Kwon Hae-hyo	

=== October–December ===
Opening		English title	Native title	Director(s)	Cast	Ref.
O C T O B E R	1	Love in the Big City	대도시의 사랑법	Lee Eon-hee	Kim Go-eun, Noh Sang-hyun	
O C T O B E R	11	Uprising	전,란	Kim Sang-man	Gang Dong-won, Park Jeong-min, Kim Shin-rok, Jin Seon-kyu, Jung Sung-il, Cha Seung-won	
O C T O B E R	16	A Normal Family	보통의 가족	Hur Jin-ho	Sul Kyung-gu, Jang Dong-gun, Kim Hee-ae, Claudia Kim	
O C T O B E R	17	Dirty Money	더러운 돈에 손대지 마라	Kim Min-soo	Jung Woo, Kim Dae-myung, Park Byung-eun	
O C T O B E R	23	Heavy Snow	폭설	Yoon Su-ik	Han Hae-in, Han So-hee	
O C T O B E R	30	Amazon Bullseye	아마존 활명수	Kim Chang-ju	Ryu Seung-ryong, Jin Seon-kyu	
N O V E M B E R	6	Deadline	데드라인	Kwon Bong-geun	Gong Seung-yeon, Park Ji-il, Jung Suk-yong, Hong Seo-joon	
N O V E M B E R	6	Hear Me: Our Summer	청설	Jo Seon-ho	Hong Kyung, Roh Yoon-seo, Kim Min-ju	
N O V E M B E R	6	Idiot Girls and School Ghost: School Anniversary	아메바 소녀들과 학교괴담: 개교기념일	Kim Min-ha	Kim Do-yeon, Son Ju-yeon, Jeong Ha-dam, Kang Shin-hee	
N O V E M B E R	14	Devils Stay	사흘	Hyun Moon-seop	Park Shin-yang, Lee Min-ki, Lee Re	
N O V E M B E R	20	Hidden Face	히든 페이스	Kim Dae-woo	Song Seung-heon, Cho Yeo-jeong, Park Ji-hyun	
D E C E M B E R	4	The Firefighters	소방관	Kwak Kyung-taek	Joo Won, Kwak Do-won, Yoo Jae-myung, Lee Yoo-young, Kim Min-jae, Oh Dae-hwan, Lee Joon-hyuk, Jang Young-nam	
D E C E M B E R	4	One Win	1승	Shin Yeon-shick	Song Kang-ho, Park Jeong-min, Jang Yoon-ju	
D E C E M B E R	11	About Family	대가족	Yang Woo-suk	Kim Yoon-seok, Lee Seung-gi, Kim Sung-ryung, Kang Han-na, Park Soo-young	
D E C E M B E R	24	Harbin	하얼빈	Woo Min-ho	Hyun Bin, Park Jeong-min, Jo Woo-jin, Jeon Yeo-been, Park Hoon, Yoo Jae-myung, Lee Dong-wook	
D E C E M B E R	31	Bogota: City of the Lost	보고타: 마지막 기회의 땅	Kim Seong-je	Song Joong-ki, Lee Hee-joon, Kwon Hae-hyo	

== See also ==
- 2024 in South Korea
- 2024 in film
- List of 2024 box office number-one films in South Korea
