= Crime City =

Crime City may refer to:

== Games ==
- Crime City (video game), a 1989 arcade video game
- Crime City, a 1992 video game by Impressions Games for DOS, Atari ST and Commodore Amiga
- Crime Cities, a 2000 video game
- Gangstar: Crime City, a 2006 open-world action-adventure video game
- CSI: Crime City, a 2010 video game
- MicroMacro: Crime City, a board game published in 2020

== Film ==
- New Crime City, a 1994 film
- Whispering City, a 1947 Canadian film also known as Crime City
- The Roundabout (film series), South Korean crime action film series also called Crime City
  - The Outlaws (2017 film), first film in the series with literal title Crime City
  - The Roundup (2022 film), second film in the series with literal title Crime City 2
  - The Roundup: No Way Out (2023), third film in the series with literal title Crime City 3
  - The Roundup: Punishment (2024), fourth film in the series with literal title Crime City 4

== Other ==
- Crime City Rollers, a women's flat track roller derby league based in Malmö, Sweden

== See also ==
- Crime & the City Solution
