= The Roundup (film series) =

South Korean crime action film series

- Hangul: 범죄도시
- Hanja: 犯罪都市
- RR: Beomjoedosi
- MR: Pŏmjoedosi
- Directed by: Kang Yoon-sung (1); Lee Sang-yong (2, 3); Heo Myung-haeng (4)
- Screenplay by: Kang Yoon-sung (1); Kim Min-seong (2)
- Release dates: October 3, 2017 (1); May 18, 2022 (2); May 31, 2023 (3); April 24, 2024 (4)
- Country: South Korea
- Language: Korean

The Roundup, also known by the first film's title as The Outlaws, (Korean: 범죄도시; RR: Beomjoedosi; lit. 'Crime City') is a South Korean crime action film series, starring Ma Dong-seok in the lead role. Each film follows true crime stories of Detective Lieutenant Ma Seok-do (played by Ma Dong-seok) hunting down vicious criminals; the character is based on real-life police detective Lieutenant Yoon Seok-ho.

The first film The Outlaws, directed by Kang Yoon-sung, starring Yoon Kye-sang as the antagonist was released in 2017. The second film titled The Roundup, directed by Lee Sang-yong and Son Suk-ku playing the antagonist, was released in 2022. The third film titled The Roundup: No Way Out, directed by Lee Sang-yong, was released on May 31, 2023. The fourth film The Roundup: Punishment had its world premiere at the 74th Berlin International Film Festival on February 23, 2024.

== Overview ==
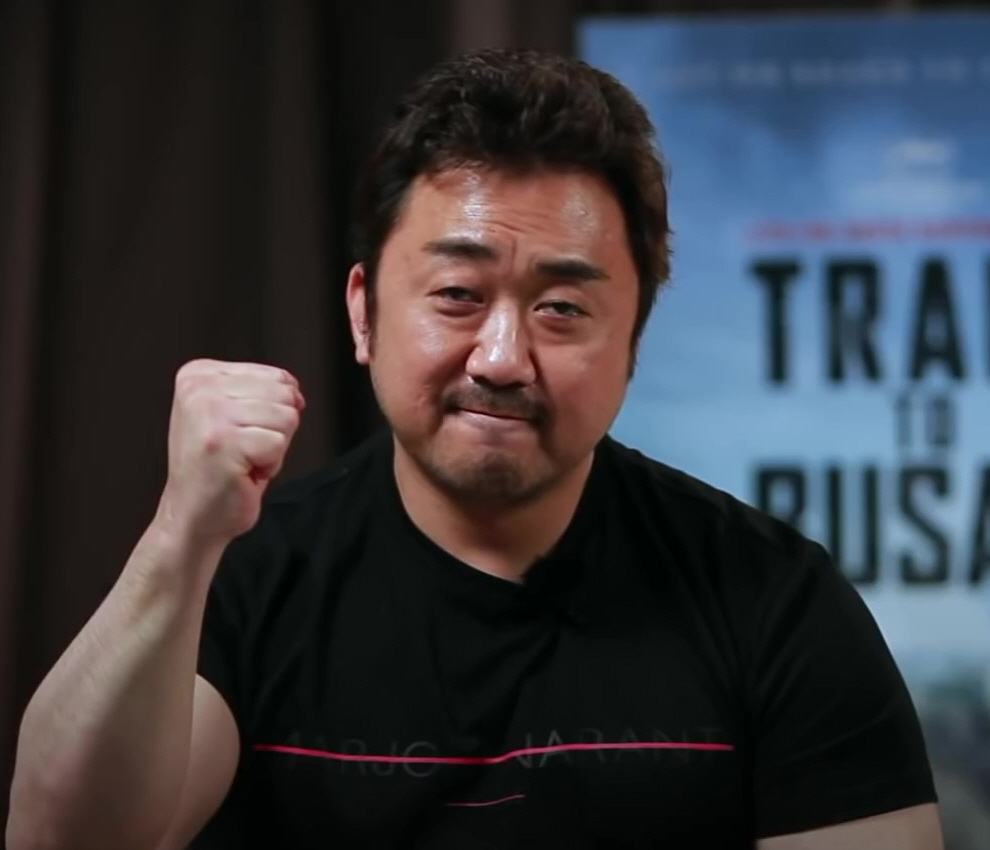
Ma Dong-seok portrays Detective Ma Seok-do in the film series.

	The Outlaws (2017)	The Roundup (2022)	The Roundup: No Way Out (2023)	The Roundup: Punishment (2024)
Native title	범죄도시	범죄도시2	범죄도시3	범죄도시4
Release date	October 3, 2017	May 18, 2022	May 31, 2023	April 24, 2024
Director	Kang Yoon-sung	Lee Sang-yong		Heo Myung-haeng
Writer	Kang Yoon-sung	Kim Min-seong		Oh Sang-ho
Production companies	Hong Film, B.A. Entertainment	Hong film, B.A. Entertainment, Big Punch Pictures		
Distributor	Megabox	ABO Entertainment, Megabox	ABO Entertainment	
Running time	121 minutes	106 minutes	105 minutes	109 minutes
Box office	US$52.9 million	US$101.2 million	US$83.4 million	US$83.5 million

== Films ==
=== The Outlaws (2017) ===
Detective Ma Seok-do and his team tries to catch a vicious crime lord named Zhang Qian, from Harbin, China who is willing to commit crimes for money and comes to Garibong-dong to collect debts.

With 6.87 million admissions and a gross of US$51.8 million, the film became the 5th highest-grossing domestic film of the year in South Korea and the third best-selling R-rated Korean film of all time.

=== The Roundup (2022) ===
Ma Seok-do and his team arrive at Ho Chi Minh City, Vietnam to interrogate a suspect, but later learn about Kang Hae-sang, a psychotic killer with a severe EDS issue, who has been committing crimes against Korean tourists for several years and decide to hunt him down.

The Roundup is directed by Lee Sang-yong who served as an assistant director in the first film. Unlike the previous film which was rated for "restricted screening" by KMRB, The Roundup was rated for "audiences 15 and over".

The film became commercially successful beyond expectations, grossing over ₩130 billion with a ₩10.5 billion budget, and was dubbed as the highest performing South Korean film since COVID-19 pandemic. It opened with a record of 467,525 admissions, the highest opening for a film released in South Korea in the last 882 days since Ashfall (2019). It registered 10 million viewers on 25th day, becoming the first film of the year 2022 and first Korean film since Parasite (2019) to achieve the feat. Surpassing US$100 million gross and 12.6 million admissions, The Roundup became 11th most-viewed and 3rd highest-grossing South Korean film in the history.

=== The Roundup: No Way Out (2023) ===
Ma Seok-do and his team are promoted to Metropolitan Investigation Unit where they battle against Ricky, a deadly yakuza and a wily dirty cop named Joo-Sung cheol, who are involved in the manufacture and distribution of a newly-invented drug called "Hyper" which is becoming popular at the clubs around Seoul.

=== The Roundup: Punishment (2024) ===
Ma Seok-do joins the Cyber Investigation Team to catch Baek Chang-ki, a former mercenary and the leader of the most notorious illegal online gambling organization.

The film was invited at the 74th Berlin International Film Festival, where it had its world premiere on February 23, 2024. It was released theatrically in South Korea on April 24, 2024, after its world premiere.

=== Tokyo Burst: Crime City (2026) ===
The Japanese adaptation of the film, titled Tokyo Burst: Crime City, was announced in the third week of February 2026. The main protagonist will be portrayed by Koshi Mizukami, co-starring with TVXQ's Yunho.

== Recurring cast and characters ==
Character	Film			
Character	The Outlaws	The Roundup	The Roundup: No Way Out	The Roundup: Punishment
Character	2017	2022	2023	2024
Ma Seok-do	Ma Dong Seok	Ma Dong Seok	Ma Dong Seok	Ma Dong Seok
Jang Yi-soo	Park Ji-hwan	Park Ji-hwan	Park Ji-hwan	Park Ji-hwan
Jeon Il-man	Choi Gwi-hwa	Choi Gwi-hwa		
Oh Dong-gyun	Heo Dong-won	Heo Dong-won		
Kang Hong-seok	Ha Jun	Ha Jun		
Chief of Police	Jung In-gi	Jung In-gi		
Jang Tae-soo			Lee Beom-soo	Lee Beom-soo
Kim Man-jae			Kim Min-jae	Kim Min-jae
Yang Jong-su			Lee Ji-hoon	Lee Ji-hoon
Jung David			Kim Do-geon	Kim Do-geon

== Future ==
In May 2022, at a press event for The Roundup, Ma Dong-seok introduced Crime City as a Korean franchise that will be produced as a series of eight films. In July 2022, in an interview with Deadline, he revealed that apart from the eight films, two additional spinoffs have been suggested, hence Crime City, in a way, would be akin to Universal's Fast & Furious franchise. Lee Sang-yong, who directed The Roundup (2022) and The Roundup: No Way Out (2023), is expected to return to direct the fifth installment in the series.

== See also ==
- Radhe (2021 film), an Indian remake of The Outlaws
