= Jin Sun-Kyu =

South Korean actor (born 1977)

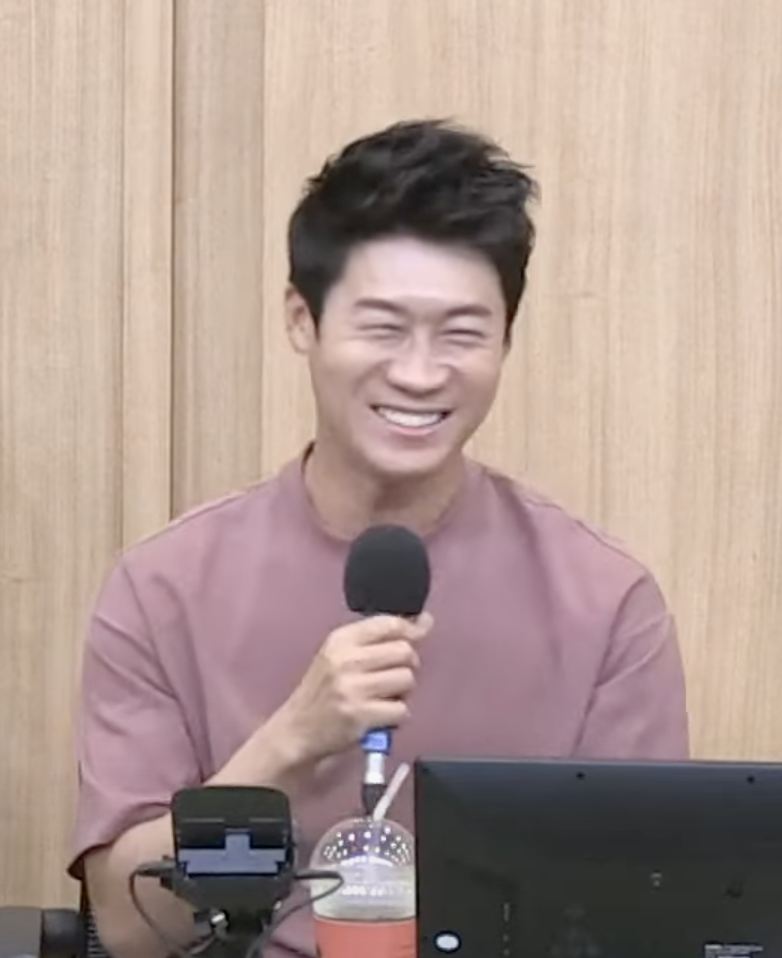
- Jin in 2019
- Born: September 13, 1977 (age 49); Jinhae, South Gyeongsang Province, South Korea
- Education: Korea National University of Arts
- Occupation: Actor
- Years active: 2004–present
- Agent: L'July Entertainment
- Spouse: Park Bo-kyung (m. 2011)

Korean name
- Hangul: 진선규
- RR: Jin Seongyu
- MR: Chin Sŏn'gyu

Jin Sun-Kyu (Korean: 진선규; born September 13, 1977) is a South Korean actor. He is best known for his roles on the big screen, such as The Outlaws (2017) and Extreme Job (2019). He won Best Supporting Actor award at the 38th Blue Dragon Film Awards in 2017 for his performance in the film The Outlaws.

== Early life and education ==
Jin was born on September 13, 1977, in Jinhae-gu, South Gyeongsang Province, South Korea. He attended Jinhae High School and enjoyed sports such as weightlifting, taekwondo, and Hapkido. Jin had a timid personality, but when he started exercising, he became more vibrant.

In 1996, during his final year of high school, Jin's aspirations took a different direction when he visited a small theater company in Jinhae with a friend. As he watched the cast practice together, he instantly fell in love with acting. Looking back, Jin realizes that he had always been shy and lived in the shadows, while others laughed and talked freely. Seeing this, he longed to immerse himself in that carefree atmosphere. Acting as someone else on stage brought him immense joy.

During the summer vacation of Jin's senior year in high school, he informed his family about his intention to attend Korea National University of Arts to pursue acting. Some family members questioned if he would consider taking the comedian exam, as they believed that acting required a good-looking face. His father also discouraged him. As the eldest son in the family, Jin's father wanted him to pursue a stable job due to their family's financial difficulties. Jin said, "This school has lower tuition compared to others, so why not go for it?" Jin's mother borrowed 1.2 million won for the entrance fee, allowing him to secretly enroll in the school. His father only learned about it when Jin presented his acceptance letter from Korea National University of Arts after the summer vacation. Jin then moved to Seoul to join the 3rd batch of the acting department at the university.

He acted in graduation performance of Jang Yu-jeong's musical.

== Career ==
Jin was one of the three founding members of Performance Delivery Service Ganda (簡多), along with Park Bo-kyung and Kim Ji-hyun. Theater Ganda was created during the time when Min Jun-ho was actively participating in regional performances, particularly in the production of The Mirror Princess Pyeonggang Story. In order to receive support funds and participate in festivals, they needed to have a theater company. That's why Min Jun-ho decided to establish Theater Ganda. The second batch of members included actors Kim Min-jae, Lee Hee-joon, Jeong Seon-ah, Park Min-jung, Jeong Yeon, Woo Ji-soon, and director Lee Jae-jun.

Jin Seon-gyu debuted in 2004 with the play The Mirror Princess Pyeonggang Story.

Jin Seon-gyu, who made his television debut with the MBC drama Road Number One (directed by Kim Jin-min) in 2010, appeared in dramas such as Mushin (2012, directed by Kim Jin-min), Pride and Prejudice (2014, directed by Kim Jin-min) and Three Days (2014, directed by Shin Kyung-soo). Recently, he confirmed his appearance in the sequel to MBC's weekend drama Rosy Lovers, The Woman (directed by Kim Geun-hong).

Jin auditioned for the role of Wen Sung-rok, a member of the Black Dragon faction from Yanbian, China, in Kang Yun-seong's movie The Outlaws. After winning the, Best, Supporting Actor award unanimously from the judges at the Blue Dragon Film Awards for his performance in that role, he rose to stardom in the film industry.

He appears in movie Confidential Assignment 2: International as Jang Myeong-jun. He portrays a villain from North Korea who serves as the head of a global criminal organization.

== Personal life ==
Jin Seon-kyu married actress Park Bo-kyung in 2011 and has two children, a son and a daughter.

== Filmography ==
=== Film ===
Year	Title	Role	Notes	Ref.
2008	The Good, the Bad, the Weird	Ghost Market Gang		
2011	Poongsan	North Korean army		
2011	Mama	Dong-sook's Doctor		
2012	Helpless	Purser		
2012	All Bark No Bite	Choong-mo		
2012	Mr. XXX-Kisser	Tunnel Reporter		
2014	Tabloid Truth	Nam-heung		
2014	Venus Talk	Deputy Kim		
2015	The Sound of a Flower	School Magazine Manager		
2015	Love Guide for Dumpees	Man at the cafe		
2016	The Hunt	Kim Joong-hyeon (Yang-soon's father)		
2016	Tunnel	Equipment Officer		
2017	The Mayor	Gil-soo		
2017	The Merciless	Security Section Chief		
2017	The Outlaws	Wi Seong-rak		
2017	The Fortress	Cho-gwan Lee Doo-gap		
2017	The Swindlers	Cousin Brother	Cameo	
2018	Herstory	Photographer's voice	Cameo	
2018	Dark Figure of Crime	Detective Jo		
2018	Intimate Strangers	Facebook man's voice	Cameo	
2018	The Villagers	Kwak Byeong-doo		
2018	Unfinished	Kim Cham-sa's Bodyguard 3, Kkong-chi		
2019	Extreme Job	Detective Ma		
2019	Svaha: The Sixth Finger	Monk Hae-an		
2019	Money	Park Chang-goo		
2019	Roman	Young Nam-bong	Cameo	
2019	Long Live the King	Jo Gwang-choon		
2019	Warning: Do Not Play	Kim Jae-hyeon		
2019	Man of Men	Dae-gook		
2021	Space Sweepers	Tiger Park / Park Kyung-soo	Netflix film	
2021	Taeil	Tae-il's Father	Animated film	
2022	Kingmaker	A farmer who goes to Seo Chang-dae's drugstore	Special appearance	
2022	Confidential Assignment 2: International	Jang Myung-jun		
2023	Count	Si-heon		
2023	Honey Sweet	Byeong-hoon		
2024	Alienoid: Return to the Future	Neung-pa		
2024	Uprising	Kim Ja-ryeong	Netflix film	
2024	Amazon Bullseye	Bang-sik		
2025	Rectangle, Triangle	Jun-ho		
2026	Husbands in Action	Hwang Chung-sik		

=== Television series ===
Year	Title	Role	Notes	Ref.
2010	Road No. 1	Go Man-yong		
2012	The Great Seer	Lee Han-baek		
2012	God of War	Gab-i		
2014	Three Days	Tattoo man killer		
2015	Make a Woman Cry	Hwang Kyeong-soo		
2015	Man of Men		Extra	
2015	Six Flying Dragons	Nam-eun		
2016	Marriage Contract	Oh Mi-ran's doctor		
2016	The Doctors	Kim Chi-hyeon		
2016	Entourage	Eun-gab's friend	Cameo (episode 3–4 & 6)	
2017	Man to Man		Cameo	
2017	Live Up to Your Name	Yeon-i's father		
2018	Lawless Lawyer	Motorcycle Officer Park	Cameo (episode 1)	
2019–2020	Kingdom	Deok-seong	Season 1–2	
2019	Be Melodramatic	Drama hero	Cameo (episode 1 & 16)	
2021	Vincenzo	unnamed robber #1, acting as a limousine taxi driver	Cameo (episode 1)	
2021	One the Woman	Chicken delivery man	Cameo (episode 1)	
2022	Through the Darkness	Gook Young-soo		
2022	Love All Play	A sushi restaurant owner	Cameo (episode 1)	
2022	Bargain	Noh Hyung-soo		
2022	Behind Every Star	himself	Cameo (episode 2–3)	
2022	Big Bet	So Jin-seok		
2023	King the Land	the policeman	Cameo (episode 4)	
2023	Revenant	Gu Kang-mo	Cameo	
2023	The Uncanny Counter	Ma Joo-seok	Season 2	
2025	The Witch	Hwang Jung-sik	Cameo	
2025	Aema	Gu Jung-ho		
2025	Heroes Next Door	Gwak Byung-nam		
2025	Typhoon Family	Park Yoon-cheol		
2025	The Price of Confession	Jang Jung-gu		
2026	100 Days of Deception	Shinichi Sato		

=== Television shows ===
Year	Title	Role	Notes	Ref.
2022–2023	Europe Outside Your Tent	Cast Member	Season 1 and 3	

=== Music video ===
Year	Song name	Artist	Ref.
2017	"Cold"	Yoon Jong-shin and Jung-in	

== Stage ==
=== Musical ===
Musical play performances
Year	Title		Role	Theater	Date	Ref.
Year	English	Korean	Role	Theater	Date	Ref.
2001	Flower Shop of Fear	공포의 꽃가게	guest number 1, Stein	KNUA Arts Theater	May 9 to 12	
2003	Dressing... Shall We Do It?	드레싱 해드릴까요?		KNUA Arts Theatre		
2004	The Wormwood	쑥부쟁이	Hunter, Immature younger siblings	Jeonju Jarimwon Auditorium	April 26	
2004	The Wormwood	쑥부쟁이	Hunter, Immature younger siblings	Iksan Circle Rehabilitation Center Outdoor Stage	April 27	
2004	The Wormwood	쑥부쟁이	Hunter, Immature younger siblings	Jinan Jinsol Alternative School outdoor stage	April 29	
2004	The Wormwood	쑥부쟁이	Hunter, Immature younger siblings	Gyeongsan Cheonggu Rehabilitation Center Auditorium	May 1	
2004	The Wormwood	쑥부쟁이	Hunter, Immature younger siblings	Yangsan Evergreen House Auditorium	May 3	
2004	The Wormwood	쑥부쟁이	Hunter, Immature younger siblings	Jeongseon Kangwon Land Resort Grand Volume	May 5	
2004	The Wormwood	쑥부쟁이	Hunter, Immature younger siblings	Hapcheon Wongyeong High School Auditorium	May 7	
2004	The Wormwood	쑥부쟁이	Hunter, Immature younger siblings	Goryeong St. Joseph Rehabilitation Center Auditorium	May 8	
2004	The Wormwood	쑥부쟁이	Hunter, Immature younger siblings	Uiryeong Eunkwang School Auditorium	May 10	
2004	The Mirror Princess Pyeonggang Story	거울공주 평강이야기	Wild boy	Hansung Art Hall 4	October 12 to November 7	
2004	The Mirror Princess Pyeonggang Story	거울공주 평강이야기	Wild boy	Seoul Arts Center	December 13 to 15	
2004	Finding Mr. Destiny	김종욱 찾기	Multiman	Seoul Arts Center	December 17 to 19	
2005	The Mirror Princess Pyeonggang Story; Small Theater Festival	거울공주 평강이야기	Wild boy	Small Theater Festival	January 25, 27 to February 20	
2005	The Mirror Princess Pyeonggang Story; Small Theater Festival	거울공주 평강이야기	Wild boy	Small Theater Festival	March 1 to 27	
2005	The Mirror Princess Pyeonggang Story; The 2nd Busan International Theater Festival	거울공주 평강이야기	Wild boy	Busan Cultural Center and Busan Citizens' Center	May 5 to 15	
2005	The Mirror Princess Pyeonggang Story; The Uijeongbu International Music Theatre Festival	의정부국제음악극축제; 거울공주 평강이야기 – 아카펠라 뮤지컬	Wild boy	Uijeongbu Arts Center (Foundation) small theater	May 21 to 22	
2005	The Mirror Princess Pyeonggang Story; The Chuncheon International Theater Festival	거울공주 평강이야기	Wild boy	Gangwon-do Chuncheon City Culture and Arts Center	June 26 to 30	
2005	The Mirror Princess Pyeonggang Story; The Milyang Summer Performing Arts Festival	거울공주 평강이야기	Wild boy	Miryang Summer Performing Arts Festival	July 26 to October 30	
2005	The Mirror Princess Pyeonggang Story; 17th Geochang International Theater Festival	(제17회) 거창국제연극제; 거울공주 평강이야기	Wild boy	Gamnamu Theater	July 31	
2005	The Mirror Princess Pyeonggang Story; The 2005 Gwacheon Hanmadang Festival	거울공주 평강이야기	Wild boy	Civic Center Small Theater	September 23 to 24	
2005	The Mirror Princess Pyeonggang Story	거울공주 평강이야기	Wild boy	Daehakro Guerrilla Theater	September 27 to October 5	
2005	The Mirror Princess Pyeonggang Story; The 2005 Seoul Arts Market	거울공주 평강이야기	Wild boy	National Theater in Jangchung-dong, Seoul	October 6 to 8	
2005	The Mirror Princess Pyeonggang Story	거울공주 평강이야기	Wild boy	Inkel Art Hall Building 2	October 12 to November 7	
2005–2006	Oh! While You were, Sleeping	오! 당신이 잠든사이		Daehakro Yeonwoo Small Theater	December 1 to January 8	
2006	The Mirror Princess Pyeonggang Story	거울공주 평강이야기	Wild Boy	Arko Arts Theater small theater	February 3 to 19	
2006	The Mirror Princess Pyeonggang Story	거울공주 평강이야기 – 당신을 뮤지컬 마니아로 만들 새로운 응원가; 살롱드라마시리즈 2	Wild Boy	Ansan Arts Center (Foundation) Byulmuri Theater	July 14 to 15	
2007–2008	Finding Mr. Destiny Season 3	김종욱 찾기 시즌3	Multiman	JTN Art Hall 1 (Daehakro Arts Plaza Hall 1)	October 23 – February 17	
2008	The Story of Mirror Princess Pyeonggang	거울공주 평강이야기	Wild Boy	Daehakro Naeon Theater	August 10	
2008	Finding Mr. Destiny Season 3	김종욱 찾기 시즌3	Multiman	JTN Art Hall 1 (Daehakro Arts Plaza Hall 1)	September 5	
2009	Finding Mr. Destiny Season 3	김종욱 찾기 시즌3	Multiman	Daegu Bongsan Cultural Center Grand Performance Hall (Gaon Hall)	January 14 – February 15	
2009	Finding Mr. Destiny Season 3	김종욱 찾기 시즌3	Multiman	Daejeon Arts Center Ensemble Hall	February 26 – March 1	
2009–2010	Jeomjeom	점점	Kim Bo-sal	Chungmu Art Hall Medium theater black	November 25 to February 7	
2012–2013	Legally Blonde	리걸리 블론드	Emmet	COEX Artium Hyundai Art Hall	Nov 17 – Mar 17	
2012–2013	Mirror Princess Pyeonggang Story	거울공주 평강이야기	wild boy	Daehakro SH Art Hall	December 11 – March 31	
2013–2014	Agatha	아가사	Roy	Lee Hae-rang Arts Theatre	Dec 31 – Feb 23	
2014	Agatha	아가사	Roy	Yes 24 Stage 2	Mar 1 – Apr 27	
2014	The Goddess is Watching	여신님이 보고 계셔	Lee Chang-seop	Doosan Art Center Yeongang Hall	Apr 26 – Jul 27	
2015	The Dwarfs	난쟁이들	Big	Chungmu Art Center Medium Theater Black	Feb 27 – April 26	
2019	Navillera	나빌레라	Shim Deok-chul	Seoul Arts Centre CJ Towol Theatre	May 1–12	
2021	Taeil	태일	Taeil	Daehakro Team	Feb 23 – May 2	

=== Theater ===
Theater play performances
Year	Title		Role	Theater	Date	Ref.
Year	English	Korean	Role	Theater	Date	Ref.
2000	Woyzeck	보이첵	businessman, soldier	KNUA Arts Theater	April 20	
2001	Barbarian Woman Ongnyeo	오랑캐 여자 옹녀		KNUA Arts Theater	May 17–19	
2001	Hamlet in Blue	햄릿인 블루		KNUA Arts Theatre	November 1 to 3	
2002	Our Country's Right	우리나라 우투리		Seoul Arts Center Jayu Small Theater	August 23 to September 1	
2002	The Hen Who Came Out of the Yard	마당을 나온 암탉	traveler, green hair	Cultural Center small theater	January 23 to February 17	
2003	De La Guarda	델라구아다	acrobat	Sejong Center for the Performing Arts	April 31	
2003	Lovers of the Greek Drama	희랍극의 연인들				
2003	Open Couple		Lighting Staff	Cultural Arts Foundation Academic Blue	April 18–19	
2004	The Story of Hareuk	하륵이야기	Emmett	Seoul Arts Center Jayu Small Theater	January 15 to February 8	
2006	The Mask	더 마스크	Cleaning lady			
2007	Chilsu and Mansu	칠수와 만수	Man-su	Yeonwoo Small Theater	March 30 to July 29	
2007	That Bastard Loved	그자식 사랑했네		Arko Art Theater	December 11 to 30	
2007–2008	Annapurna of My Heart	내 마음의 안나푸르나	son-in-law	Daehakro Theater	May 16 to June 18	
2008	Shall we go to karaoke... and talk?	우리 노래방 가서... 얘기 좀 할까?	father	Parade to commemorate the opening of Daehakro Naeon Theater	March 7 to April 6	
2008	That Bastard Loved	그자식 사랑했네		Parade to commemorate the opening of Daehakro Naeon Theater	April 12 to May 12	
2008	Annapurna of My Heart	내 마음의 안나푸르나	son-in-law	Parade to commemorate the opening of Daehakro Naeon Theater	May 16 to June 18	
2008	End Room	끝방		Parade to commemorate the opening of Daehakro Naeon Theater	June 24 – July 20	
2008	The Mask	더 마스크		Parade to commemorate the opening of Daehakro Naeon Theater	September 1	
2008	Once Upon a Time	옛날 옛적에		Parade to commemorate the opening of Daehakro Naeon Theater	September 3	
2009	Shall we go to karaoke... and talk?	우리 노래방 가서... 얘기 좀 할까?	Karaoke owner	Arirang Art Hall in Seongbuk-gu	March 6	
2009	The Tale of a Slow Thief	늘근도둑 이야기	younger thief	Sangmyung Art Hall		
2011	Bald Female Singer	대머리 여가수	Mr. Seo	Daehakro SM Art Hall	Jan 14 – Mar 31	
2011	If I'm with You	너와 함께라면	father	Gyeonggi Arts Center Cozy Small Theater	Oct 22–23	
2011–2012	If I'm with You	너와 함께라면	Koiso Kunitaro	COEX Art Hall	April 22 – Jan 1	
2012	Chilsu and Mansu	칠수와 만수	Mansu	Daehakro T.O.M. Building 1	May 4 – July 8	
2012–2013	That place	거기	Byeongdo	Art One Theater Hall 3	Seo 7 – Feb 4	
2013	Me and Grandpa	나와 할아버지	Grandpa	Art One Theater Hall 3	Feb 2 – April 20	
2013	The Story of Fairy	선녀씨 이야기	Jong-woo	Art Center K Nemo Theater	Aug 16 – Sep 15	
2013–2014	Almost, Maine	올모스트 메인	East	Art Plaza 4, Daehak-ro	Nov 11 – Jan 19	
2014	Me and Grandpa	나와 할아버지 – 고양	Jun-hee	Art One Theater Hall 3	Feb 2 – April 20	
2014	Autumn Fireflies	가을 반딧불이	Bunpei	Seoul Arts Center Jayu Small Theater	Jun 19 – Jul 20	
2014	Shall We Go to the Karaoke and Talk?	우리 노래방가서 얘기 좀 할까	Min-jae	Dongsung Art Centre Small Theatre	Aug 9 – Oct 19	
2014	Shall We Go to the Karaoke and Talk?	우리 노래방가서 얘기 좀 할까	Min-jae	Dongsung Art Centre Small Theatre	Oct 6	
2014	Shall We Go to the Karaoke and Talk?	우리 노래방가서 얘기 좀 할까	Min-jae	Gyeonggi Art Centre Small Theatre	Dec 24–25	
2014–2015	Hot Summer	뜨거운 여름	Jae-hee	Dongsung Art Center Small Theater	Nov 1 – Jan 11	
2015	Me and Grandpa	나와 할아버지 – 고양	Grandpa	Yegreen Theater	May 5 – Aug 2	
2015	Hot Summer	뜨거운 여름	Jae-hee	Daehak-ro Jayu Theater	August 11 to November 1	
2016	Me and Grandpa	나와 할아버지 – 고양	Grandpa	Gangdong Art Center Small Theater Dream	June 9–11	
2017	New Humanity's 100% Debate	신인류의 백분토론	Jeon Jin-ki	Arko Arts Theater Small Theater	February 10 to 26	
2017	New Humanity's 100% Debate	신인류의 백분토론	Jeon Jin-ki	Art One Theater 3	May 19 to July 9	
2017	New Humanity's 100% Debate	신인류의 백분토론	Jeon Jin-ki	Goyang Aram Nuri Sara Sae Theater	July 15 to 22	
2018	Doosan Humanities Theater 2018 Altruism – Nassim	두산인문극장 2018 이타주의자 – 낫심		Doosan Art Center Space111	April 10–29	
2018	New Humanity's 100% Debate	신인류의 백분토론	Jeon Jin-ki	Hongik University Daehangno Art Center Small Theater	July 20 to August 19	
2019	Me and Grandpa	나와 할아버지 – 고양	Grandpa	Seokyeong University Performing Arts Center Scone Hall 1	Feb 8 – Mar 8	
2020	Shall We Go to the Karaoke and Talk?	우리 노래방가서 얘기 좀 할까	Min-jae	Seokyeong University Performing Arts Center Scone Hall 1	Feb 8 – Mar 8	
2024	Flower, Past the Stars	꽃, 별이 지나	Jeong-hu	Seokyeong University Performing Arts Center Scone Hall 1	June 8, 2024	

== Ambassadorship ==
- KRX Gold Market Ambassador (2019–present)
- President of the Alumni Association of Korea National University of Arts

== Accolades ==
=== Awards and nominations ===
Name of the award ceremony, year presented, category, nominee of the award, and the result of the nomination
Award ceremony	Year	Category	Nominee / Work	Result	Ref.
APAN Star Awards	2022	Excellence Award, Actor in a Miniseries	Through the Darkness	Won	
Baeksang Arts Awards	2018	Best Supporting Actor – Film	The Outlaws	Nominated	
Baeksang Arts Awards	2019	Best Supporting Actor – Film	Extreme Job	Nominated	
Baeksang Arts Awards	2026	Best Supporting Actor – Television	Aema	Nominated	
Blue Dragon Film Awards	2017	Best Supporting Actor	The Outlaws	Won	
Blue Dragon Film Awards	2019	Best Supporting Actor	Extreme Job	Nominated	
Blue Dragon Film Awards	2021	Best Supporting Actor	Space Sweepers	Nominated	
Blue Dragon Series Awards	2023	Best Actor	Bargain	Nominated	
Blue Dragon Series Awards	2026	Best Supporting Actor	Aema	Nominated	
Brand of the Year Awards	2019	Film Actor of the Year	—N/a	Won	
Buil Film Awards	2019	Best Supporting Actor	Extreme Job	Nominated	
Chunsa Film Art Awards	2018	Best Supporting Actor	The Outlaws	Nominated	
Chunsa Film Art Awards	2019	Best Supporting Actor	Extreme Job	Nominated	
Film Award of the Year	2018	Best Supporting Actor	The Outlaws	Won	
Grand Bell Awards	2018	Best Supporting Actor	The Outlaws	Nominated	
Grand Bell Awards	2020	Best Supporting Actor	Extreme Job	Won	
Grand Bell Awards	2023	Best Actor in a Series	Bargain	Nominated	
Korean Association of Film Critics Awards	2019	Best Supporting Actor	Extreme Job	Won	
SBS Drama Awards	2022	Excellence Award, Actor in a Miniseries Genre/Fantasy Drama	Through the Darkness	Won	
SBS Drama Awards	2022	Best Supporting Team	Through the Darkness	Nominated	
SBS Drama Awards	2023	Best Performance	Revenant	Won	
Scene Stealer Festival	2021	Bonsang "Main Prize"	Space Sweepers	Won	
The Seoul Awards	2018	Best Supporting Actor (Film)	The Outlaws	Nominated	

=== State honors ===
Name of country, year given, and name of honor
Country or Organization	Year	Honor or Award	Ref.
South Korea (Note: Honors are given at the Korean Popular Culture and Arts Awards, arranged by the Korea Creative Content Agency and hosted by the Ministry of Culture, Sports and Tourism. They are awarded to those who have contributed to the arts and South Korea's pop culture.)	2019	Minister of Culture, Sports and Tourism Commendation	

=== Listicles ===
Name of publisher, year listed, name of listicle, and placement
Publisher	Year	Listicle	Placement	Ref.
The Screen	2019	2009–2019 Top Box Office Powerhouse Actors in Korean Movies	44th	
Korean Film Council	2021	Korean Actors 200 (Note: Introduces 200 actors that best represent the present and future of Korean cinema to the people in the film industry all over the world.)	Included	
