= The Villagers (film) =

- Theatrical release poster
- Hangul: 동네사람들
- RR: Dongne saramdeul
- MR: Tongne saramdŭl
- Directed by: Lim Jin-sun
- Screenplay by: Lim Jin-sun
- Produced by: Seo Jong-hae
- Starring: Ma Dong-seok; Kim Sae-ron; Lee Sang-yeob; Jin Seon-kyu; Jang Gwang
- Production company: DayDream
- Distributed by: Little Big Pictures
- Release date: November 7, 2018
- Running time: 99 minutes
- Country: South Korea
- Language: Korean
- Box office: US$2.8 million

The Villagers (Korean: 동네사람들; lit. 'Neighborhood') is a 2018 South Korean action thriller film directed by Lim Jin-sun, starring Ma Dong-seok and Kim Sae-ron (in her final film appearance during her lifetime). It was released on November 7, 2018.

== Plot ==
Gi-cheol, a former boxing champion, is appointed as a PE teacher at an all girls' high school in a small village, where a student named Han Soo-Yeon had recently gone missing. The girl's disappearance is largely a mystery, but Gi-cheol gets a strange feeling about the town after his arrival as all the villagers seem uptight and highly agitated.

After he gets acquainted with one student, Yoo-jin, when he finds her skipping out on class at afternoon to go look for Soo-Yeon, who is her best friend, Gi-cheol realizes that Yoo-jin is actually the only person in the entire town, who seems to care about finding the missing school girl and finds that many girls are missing in the village with the police not caring about the case. Gi-cheol writes a letter to request a search warrant and begins the investigation with his friend Inspector Dong-soo.

While at school Gi-cheol finds a group of girls smoking tobacco in the bathroom, but they pretend they weren't. While searching for the cigarettes, Gi-cheol finds a cameras hidden in the girl's toilet and discovers it was placed by the art teacher, Ji-Sung. Gi-cheol realizes Ji-Sung to be Soo-Yeon's kidnapper after checking the man's text messages between him and Soo-Yeon. Realizing that Ji-Sung is about to meet Yoo-jin, Gi-cheol rushes to save her. Yoo-jin (after Gi-cheol had told her about Ji-Sung's involvement in Soo-Yeon's kidnapping) questions Ji-Sung about his involvement in Soo-Yeon's kidnapping, and he knocks her unconscious before taking her to his house.

Gi-cheol finds Ji-Sung at his house, where he attacks Ji-Sung and interrogates him. Ji-Sung explains that Soo-Yeon had called him to pick her up and Soo-Yeon told Ji-Sung to leave her at a petrol bunk as someone will arrive to pick her up. Ji-Sung then drops her off and leaves, but feels uneasy for leaving her alone and returns, only to finds she has disappeared and left behind her cell-phone. After the confession, Yoo-jin calls the police and Ji-Sung is held into custody. The police chief is revealed to be in cahoots with the kidnapper.

Later, Gi-cheol receives a call from Dong-Soo, who reveals that Soo-Yeon's corpse has been found, which leaves Yoo-jin devastated. The Police Chief finds out that Dong-soo is involved in the case investigation and calls the kidnapper. Dong-Soo checks Soo-Yeon's phone and finds her chat conversation with Lee Seul, who is the madam of a club named Janus which he reports to Gi-cheol before being knocked unconscious by someone. Gi-cheol leaves for Janus to meet Lee Seul, who reveals that Soo-Yeon was a part time singer at the club where she was molested by the club's bar owner, whom she attacked him before escaping.

Gi-cheol interrogates Gwak-Sajang, the owner of the club, after he defeats his henchmen. Sajang claims Ji-Sung was the one who killed Soo-Yeon as Ji-Sung had loved Soo-Yeon, but she had rejected his advances, and also that Ji-Sung is actually politician Ki-Tae's son. Gi-cheol reports it to Dong-Soo, who learns that Ji-Sung has been released and deduces that Yoo-jin is also in danger. Ji-Sung kidnaps Yoo-jin and takes her to another location where he hides her in a closet. Ki-Tae arrives and tells Ji-Sung to leave for US.

Ji-Sung reveals that Ki-Tae himself was actually Soo-Yeon's killer. Ki-Tae had choked Soo-Yeon to death to save his political career and reputation due to Ji-Sung's antics. Later, Yoo-jin tries to escape from Ji-Sung and is severely wounded before Gi-cheol reaches the hideout and attacks Ji-sung, while learning Ki-tae's true colors. Gi-cheol admits Yoo-jin to the hospital and Ki-tae wins the election and is elected as the Governor.

Furious, Gi-cheol attacks Ki-Tae's convoy at night. With Dong-Soo's help, Gi-cheol reveals Ki-Tae and the police chief's involvement in Soo-Yeon's murder to the media. Ki-Tae and the police chief are stripped of their respective positions and are arrested. Gi-cheol visits Yoo-jin at the hospital, who thanks him for solving her friend's disappearance. Gi-cheol leaves for another village to start a new life.

== Cast ==
- Ma Dong-seok as Yeok Gi-cheol
- Kim Sae-ron as Kang Yoo-jin
- Lee Sang-yeob as Ji Sung
- Jin Seon-kyu as Byung-doo
- Jang Gwang as Ki-tae
- Oh Hee-joon as Dong-soo
- Shin Se-hwi as Han Soo-yeon

== Production ==
Filming began July 21, 2017 and finished September 30, 2017.

== Release ==
The film was released on November 7, 2018, alongside Goosebumps 2: Haunted Halloween, Ode to the Goose (November 8), and The Wrath (November 8).

== Reception ==
Yoon Min-sik from The Korea Herald gave a mixed review and wrote, "The Villagers has an interesting premise, a promising set-up, good acting and a strong first act -- but maybe not enough thrill, and bit of a letdown in the third act."
