= The Roundup: Punishment =

2024 film by Heo Myung-haeng

- Theatrical release poster
- Hangul: 범죄도시4
- Hanja: 犯罪都市4
- Lit.: Crime City 4
- RR: Beomjoedosi4
- MR: Pŏmjoedosi4
- Directed by: Heo Myung-haeng
- Written by: Oh Sang-ho
- Produced by: Ma Dong-seok
- Starring: Ma Dong-seok; Kim Mu-yeol; Park Ji-hwan; Lee Dong-hwi
- Cinematography: Lee Sung-je
- Edited by: Kim Sun-min
- Music by: Yoon Il-sang
- Production companies: Bigpunch Pictures; Hong Film; B.A. Entertainment
- Distributed by: ABO Entertainment
- Release dates: February 23, 2024 (Berlinale); April 24, 2024 (South Korea)
- Running time: 109 minutes
- Country: South Korea
- Language: Korean
- Box office: US$80.4 million

The Roundup: Punishment (Korean: 범죄도시4; RR: Beomjoedosi4) is a 2024 South Korean action crime film directed by Heo Myung-haeng and stars Ma Dong-seok, Kim Mu-yeol, Park Ji-hwan and Lee Dong-hwi. It is the fourth installment of The Roundup series. The film is based on the November 2015 Pattaya murder case of Thailand in which South Koreans in Thailand kidnapped, imprisoned and exploited computer programmers to operate an illegal gambling website.

The Roundup: Punishment was selected in the 'Berlinale Special Gala' section at the 74th Berlin International Film Festival and was screened on February 23, 2024. It was released theatrically on April 24, 2024, in IMAX and 4DX screening formats. It received positive reviews from critics and grossed $80.4 million worldwide, becoming the second-highest-grossing Korean film of 2024 and the eight-highest-grossing Korean film of all time.

== Plot ==
In the Philippines, Baek Chang-gi, a former Korean Special Forces and current head of an online gambling organization, kills his worker Jo Sung-jae as he attempts an escape. Chang Dong-cheol, the casino administrator, promises to increase Baek's share in exchange for shutting down a rival casino and take over their patrons. Baek stages a violent raid on the rival's server and takes the members' data, but Chang does not fulfill his promise. Baek flies back to South Korea to confront Chang.

Meanwhile, Detective Ma Seok-do investigates a possible case of online money laundering committed by Jo, but he learns about Jo's gruesome death. Jo's body is sent back to South Korea, where Ma studies the autopsy report and realizes that the case might have much deeper implications. Jo's grieving mother pleads with Ma to get justice for her son and takes her own life, which makes Ma determined to capture the culprits. Ma joins the agency's Cyber Investigation team. They trace Jo's employment history and data backup in the cloud to a money laundering joint, where they apprehend the manager, Choi Yu-seong. Ma discovers that they are dealing with an online gambling ring, so he approaches Jang Yi-soo for help, as he had previously ventured into the industry.

Jang reveals his establishment was raided by the Emperor's Casino, which seeks to monopolize the online gambling industry. Baek meets with Chang in his isolated villa, who reveals he is working on a cryptocurrency scheme under the name of QM Holdings, with President Kwon as the public face, and is pushing to register it in the exchange. Chang tells Baek to accompany Ko to bribe the exchange representative. Impatient, Baek kills Ko and threatens the representative into accepting the bribe. Baek also assassinates Choi to stop him from becoming a witness against him. Concerned about Baek's actions, Chang orders Kwon to eliminate Baek.

Ma attempts to crash Chang's cryptocurrency opening event to investigate the possible link between QM Holdings and the Emperor's Casino, but is ambushed by Baek and his men. Ma manages to subdue one of the attackers, but Baek escapes and injures a civilian. Furious with lack of progress, the police chief disbands Ma's team. However, Ma begs the police agency commissioner to continue with the investigation. With the approval from the police agency commissioner and Jang's know-how, the team launches a fake casino operation to lure those behind the Emperor's Casino into raiding them.

In conjunction with the Philippine National Police, they seize the Emperor's Casino server and trace the data to Korea, confirming that QM Holdings is indeed the front for the Emperor's Casino. After defeating Kwon's goons, Baek conspires with Kwon to obtain Chang's admin key and kills the latter. After duping and killing Chang, Baek takes the server data stored in the villa to reestablish the ring overseas, while leaving the rest for Kwon. The police storm the villa before Kwon finishes gathering the money. Ma personally confronts Baek and a brutal fight ensues; Ma defeats Baek and arrests him. Jang gets arrested for impersonating a cop after flaunting his fake badge which Ma had given him.

== Cast ==
=== Main ===
- Ma Dong-seok as Ma Seok-do, Lieutenant of the Seoul Metropolitan Police Agency Investigation team.
- Kim Mu-yeol as Baek Chang-ki, a former Korean Special Forces and current head of an online gambling organization.
- Park Ji-hwan as Jang Yi-soo (Chinese: 張夷帥, Zhang Yishuai), an arcade's chairman.
- Lee Dong-hwi as Chang Dong-cheol, an IT genius and young CEO of the coin industry.

=== Supporting ===
==== Metropolitan Investigation Unit ====
- Lee Beom-soo as Jang Tae-soo, Captain of the Seoul Metropolitan Police Agency Investigation team.
- Kim Min-jae as Kim Man-jae, a detective of the Seoul Metropolitan Police Agency Investigation team and Seok-do's dependable right-hand man.
- Lee Ji-hoon as Yang Jong-su, a detective sergeant of the Seoul Metropolitan Police Agency Investigation team.
- Kim Do-geon as Jung David, a rookie detective of the Seoul Metropolitan Police Agency Investigation team.

==== Cyber Investigation Team ====
- Lee Joo-bin as Han Ji-soo, a detective of the Seoul Metropolitan Police Agency Cyber Investigation Team.
- Kim Shin-bi as Kang Nam-soo, a detective of the Seoul Metropolitan Police Agency Cyber Investigation Team.

==== Emperor Casino (Villain) ====
- Kim Ji-hoon as Cho Ji-hoon, a former Korean Special Forces and Baek Chang-gi's subordinate, director of the online gambling organization. He is the secondary antagonist in the film.
- Ahn Sung-bong as Jason, a former Korean Special Forces, Chang-gi's subordinate, and member of the online gambling organization.
- Ryu Ji-hoon as Manager Lee, a manager of the Philippines online gambling organization.
- Bae Jae-won as Choi Yu-seong, a member of the online gambling organization and in charge of money laundering. He was killed by Chang-ki.

==== QM Holdings (Dissolution) ====
- Hyun Bong-sik as President Kwon
- Kim Myung-ki as Representative Ko Jae-hyuk. He was killed by Chang-ki.

==== Seoul Night Club ====
- Kim Young-woong as a man of President Cheon
- Kwak Ja-hyung as President Cheon

=== Others ===
- Lee Sang-jin as a drug delivery man
- Baek Seung-hwan as Jo Sung-jae, Dong-cheol's subordinate and a worker who was killed by Chang-ki.
- Im Seo-ah as Yi-soo's girlfriend 1
- Komleva Zoia as Yi-soo's girlfriend 2
- Lee Han-sol as Yi-soo's subordinate 1
- Hong Sang-woo as Yi-soo's subordinate 2
- Kim Ho-jun as a casino salesman
- Nico Antonio as a Philippine National Police officer. He was killed by Chang-ki.
- Celeste Jomer as a casino wholesaler who deals with Yi-Soo speaking in Tagalog.
- Kwon Il-yong as Commissioner of the Seoul Metropolitan Police Agency
- Park Bo-kyung as a Pathologist
- Bae Hae-sun as Sung-jae's mother
- Kmi Soo-jin as Kim Jin-sook

=== Special appearance ===
- Jung In-gi as Chief of Metropolitan Police Station

== Production ==
In August 2022, it was reported that Kim Mu-yeol and Lee Dong-hwi joined the cast of the film as villains. In September of the same year Lee Beom-soo and Kim Min-jae confirmed in separate interviews during filming of The Roundup: No Way Out that they will be appearing in the next film of the series.

The cast of the film was confirmed on November 18, 2022, and the same day principal photography began. In February 2023, it was reported that on February 19 filming in the Philippines began.

Heo Myung-haeng, the martial arts director of the first three films, was chosen to direct the fourth part, director Lee Sang-yong was to direct the third and fourth films simultaneously but that did not come to fruition due to production constraints.

== Release ==
The film launched its pre-sales in May 2023 at Cannes Film Market held in conjunction with the 2023 Cannes Film Festival. It was sold to United States, Europe and Asia.

The film was accepted to the 74th Berlin International Film Festival, where it had its world premiere on February 23, 2024.

The film was pre-sold in 164 countries globally. It will be released in May 2024 in Australia, New Zealand, Taiwan, Mongolia, Hong Kong, Singapore, Malaysia, Brunei, North America, the United Kingdom, Cambodia, and Thailand.

After its world premiere, it was released theatrically in South Korea on April 24, 2024, in IMAX and 4DX formats.

The film was screened in 'Midnight Screenings' at the 58th Karlovy Vary International Film Festival on June 28, 2024.

The film was showcased in 'Prime Picks' at the 23rd New York Asian Film Festival on July 27, 2024.

The film screened at the 28th Fantasia International Film Festival on July 31, 2024.

== Soundtrack ==
The Roundup: Punishment

Soundtrack album by Yoon Il-sang
- Released: April 30, 2024
- Recorded: 2024
- Genre: Soundtrack
- Languages: Korean; English
- Labels: 142 music; sound press
- Producer: Yoon Il-sang
Audio Full Album
- The Roundup: Punishment OST on YouTube

All Composition and Arrangement by Yoon Il-sang and lyrics by Lee Seung-ho.

There are 30 tracks in the album:
No.	Title	Length
1.	"The Beginning"	2:40
2.	"Hiding Drugs"	1:03
3.	"Homicide Detective"	0:50
4.	"Surprise Attack"	1:49
5.	"Workplace"	1:36
6.	"Shut It Down"	4:17
7.	"Keep Your Promise"	0:49
8.	"Restart"	0:50
9.	"Operation Begins"	1:20
10.	"Small Fries"	2:01
11.	"Dividend"	2:03
12.	"Mr. Jang"	0:46
13.	"Jang's Plan"	1:59
14.	"Believe Jang"	1:39
15.	"He's crazy"	1:00
16.	"Fugitive"	1:01
17.	"Easy Kill"	1:04
18.	"Evidence from Death"	0:58
19.	"Bad News"	1:05
20.	"Round One"	3:19
21.	"Attack the Devil"	3:10
22.	"Operation Instructions"	4:18
23.	"To the Philippines"	1:22
24.	"Jang Dong-Chul's End"	3:05
25.	"It's Time to Move Out"	2:54
26.	"Police Rally"	1:54
27.	"Good Will Win"	4:50
28.	"Final Punishment"	4:34
29.	"City Cleaner"	3:12
30.	"Rough Life feat. Park Ji-hwan"	3:18

== Reception ==
=== Box office ===
The film was released on April 24, 2024, on 2,930 screens. On its opening day, the film finished in first place at the South Korean box office with 821,631 admissions and a gross of US$4,911,392, breaking the highest opening for a film released in 2024 in South Korea, additionally surpassing the opening of The Roundup (2022) of 467,525 people and The Roundup: No Way Out (2023) of 740,874 people, thus setting a new record for the highest opening in the history of The Roundup (film series). It is also among the top 4 openings for the Korean films of all time. The film topped the South Korean weekend box office in its opening weekend, grossing US$20,858,786 from 2,918,560 admissions. It kept its number position on the South Korean box office for consecutive four weekends from April 28 to May 19, 2024.

On April 27, the fourth day of its release, the film exceeded 2 million admissions, and the next day on April 28, it surpassed 4 million viewers. On May 26, within 33 days of its release it registered 11 million viewers.

As of July 19, 2024, the film has grossed US$79,337,169 from 11,500,775 admissions, making it the second highest-grossing film among the South Korean films released in 2024. The film has grossed $83,539,202 worldwide as per Box Office Mojo.

=== Critical response ===
On the review aggregator Rotten Tomatoes website, the film has an approval rating of 91% based on 23 reviews, with an average rating of 7/10. The website consensus reads: "The Roundup: Punishment embraces its bruising simplicity with confidence, pairing bone-rattling fight choreography and playful banter to deliver an unpretentious action showcase."

Clarence Tsui of the South China Morning Post rated the film 3/5 and lauded the sound effects writing, "The simple story is bolstered by brilliant sound effects, Ma's endearing tech illiteracy, and Park Ji-hwan's performance as his sidekick."

Wendy Ide reviewing the film at Berlinale, wrote in ScreenDaily "Don Lee packs a punch in the fourth instalment of the popular Korean action comedy series."

Stephanie Bunbury, in her review at Berlinale for Deadline said, "The Roundup: Punishment makes no intellectual demands on its audience, as that isn't what it's there for." Concluding her review she wrote, "In a genre where constant bafflement over plot details is the norm, this series stands out as carefully crafted, and fun, obviously."

Writing for RogerEbert.com, Robert Daniels said, "Punishment" is a rock 'em, sock 'em edition that pretty much delivers all the open-hand slaps, booming punches, and flying knees to the head you want."

Jessica Kiang writing in Variety gave positive review and praised; the director Heo Myung-haeng, saying "Heo Myeong-haeng proves to be a very efficient action director"; the cinematographer Lee Sung-je, expressing, "Lee Sung-je has an unerring instinct for placing the camera where it can best exploit the contrast between the speed of Lee's movements and the resigned stoicism of his expression"; and the sound designer Gong Tae-won, stating, "But if there's a below-the-line standout craftsperson it's probably Gong Tae-won, who manages to foley consistently satisfying punch noises." Kiang opined, "[the film] sees Don Lee's Detective Ma find a new bunch of bad guys to beat up and is basically perfect, no notes."

Niklas Michels, in his Berlinale-related review for the German Arthaus magazine Kino-Zeit, wrote that The Roundup: Punishment is a film for the cinema in which villains are simply evil without being a perversion of a hero. He drew parallels to the John Wick franchise, in which he emphasized that although the films could keep up in terms of action, John Wick was a much more subversive story. In The Roundup, dramaturgy was only located in the thrill of the final battle. He praised the film for its craft, but added that the series was treading water.

Darcy Paquet writing on Korean Film Organisation website said, "Director Heo balances this perfectly, delivering what may well be the most dynamic and entertaining Roundup film yet."
