= The Outlaws (2017 film) =

2017 South Korean film by Kang Yoon-sung

- Theatrical release poster
- Hangul: 범죄도시
- Hanja: 犯罪都市
- Lit.: Crime City
- RR: Beomjoedosi
- MR: Pŏmjoedosi
- Directed by: Kang Yun-seong
- Written by: Kang Yun-seong
- Produced by: Yoo Yeong-chae
- Starring: Ma Dong-seok; Yoon Kye-sang
- Cinematography: Ju Sung-lim; Kim Yong-seong
- Edited by: Kim Sun-min; Hwang Eun-ju
- Music by: Mowg
- Production companies: Hong Film; B.A. Entertainment
- Distributed by: Megabox Plus M
- Release date: October 3, 2017 (South Korea)
- Running time: 121 minutes
- Country: South Korea
- Language: Korean
- Box office: US$52.9 million

The Outlaws, also written as The Roundup: The Outlaws, (Korean: 범죄도시; lit. 'Crime City') is a 2017 South Korean crime action film written and directed by Kang Yoon-sung, and starring Ma Dong-seok, and Yoon Kye-sang. It was released on October 3, 2017. Set in 2004, the film revolves around Detective Ma Seok-do, who tries to control the gang-wars between Chinese-Korean gangs while also dealing with a savage loan shark named Zhang Qian.

The film is based on a May 2004 incident in the Chinatown of Garibong-dong, Guro District, Seoul when 14 Chinese-Koreans from the "Wang Geon-i faction" were arrested on charges of attempted murder, and an April 2007 incident in which 7 members of the Yanbian organization "Heuksa-pa", also based in the Garibong-dong, were arrested and 26 were indicted without detention.

The Outlaws is the first installment of The Roundup series. It was followed by three sequels: The Roundup (2022), The Roundup: No Way Out (2023), and The Roundup: Punishment (2024).

== Plot ==
Ma Suk-Do is a detective in Geumcheon, Guro District, Seoul. Ma and Captain Jeon Il-man try to keep the peace while two local Chinese-Korean gangs, the Venom Gang headed by Ahn Sung-Tae and the Cobra Gang headed by Jang-I-Soo, battle over control of Chinatown.

Zhang Qian, the bloodthirsty leader of the Chinese loansharking Black Dragon Gang, makes his own brutal moves to take over Chinatown along with his henchmen Wei Chengluo and Yang Tai. They kill Sung-Tae and take over Jang-I-Soo's casino. Enraged, Jang-I-Soo attempts to retake the casino and his men fight Sung-Rak and Yung-Tae; however they are interrupted by Ma, who arrests Chengluo but Yang-Tai escapes and informs Qian.

Ma and Jeon learn about Qian's crimes and make moves to arrest him. Qian and Yang-Tai attack Jang-I-Soo at his mother's birthday party, apparently killing him. Hwang, a hotelier whose men Qian had also killed, sends his men to kill Qian in revenge but he manages to escape; Qian later tries to kill Hwang in return but fails. Desperate to stop the escalating violence, Ma turns to Chinatown's residents for help to catch Chen and the Chinese loan sharks; they agree and start secretly taking photos of the gang members to identify them.

Ma and his fellow police officers set a trap and arrest all of the gang members, including Yang-Tai, but Qian escapes. Police officer Kang Hong-seok sees Qian and pursues him; Qian almost runs him over with a car before Ma saves him by crashing into him. Ma chases after Qian but loses sight of him, only to discover that he has attacked some of the Chinatown residents who had helped Ma, who tell him that Qian plans to fly to China.

Zhang Qian reaches the airport, where Ma confronts him in the restroom. They fight and Ma manages to knock down Qian and leaves him handcuffed. The gang members are arrested and Jeon is congratulated by the commissioner. As Ma and his team head out to celebrate, Ma is called by the commissioner to investigate another case.

== Cast ==
- Ma Dong-seok as Ma Seok-do, a Detective Lieutenant in Seoul's Crime Unit, assigned to put an end to Chinese-Korean gang wars in the Garibong district, of Seoul.
- Yoon Kye-sang as Zhang Qian (Chinese: 張謙 / 张谦), a notorious crime lord, from Harbin, China, leader of the "black dragon gang" (Heilungbo, 黒龙波) a Triad gang, who comes to Garibong to collect debts, and is known for dismembering anyone who resists.
- Jo Jae-yoon as Boss Hwang Choon-sik
- Choi Gwi-hwa as Captain Jeon Il-man
- Im Hyung-joon as Do Seung-woo
- Jin Seon-kyu as Wei Chengluo (Chinese: 魏成洛), Qian's dependable right-hand man.
- Hong Ki Joon as Sergeant Park Byeong-sik
- Heo Dong-won as Detective Oh Dong-gyoon
- Ha Jun as Detective Kang Hong-seok
- Kim Sung-kyu as Yang Tai (Chinese: 樣態), Zhang Qian's dependable left-hand man.
- Park Ji-hwan as Jang Yi-soo (Chinese: 張夷帥, Zhang Yishuai)
- Heo Sung-tae as Ahn Sung-tae (Viper)
- Min Kyung-jin as Yeon Gil Restaurant CEO
- Uhm Ji-sung as Wang-oh
- Kim Gu-taek as CEO Kwak
- Park Sang-gyu as CEO Won
- Yoo Ji-yeon as Ahn Hye-kyeong

=== Special appearances ===
- Cho Jin-woong as Chief of Regional police investigation unit
- Jung In-gi as Chief of police
- Oh Min-ae as Garibong-dong female merchant
- Ye Jung-hwa as Airport head
- Yoon Joo as Kang Hong-seok's fiancée

== Production ==
=== Filming ===
Principal photography began on February 27, 2017, and ended on July 19, 2017.

=== Original soundtrack ===
Released on September 7, 2017
No.	Title	Lyrics	Music	Artist	Length
1.	"Dirty Dog"	Killagramz	Big Banana	Killagramz	3:04
2.	"Dirty Dog" (Inst.)		Big Banana		3:04
Total length:					6:08

== Reception ==
The Outlaws opened in South Korea on October 3, 2017. By October 23, it grossed US$36.3 million from more than 5 million admissions. One month after it was released, the film marked 6.05 million admissions, with US$44.1 million gross. By December 1, the film had reached 6.87 million admissions with a gross of US$51.8 million, making it the 3rd highest-grossing domestic film of the year in South Korea and the third best-selling R-rated Korean film of all time.

== Awards and nominations ==
Year	Award	Category	Recipient	Result	Ref.
2017	37th Korean Association of Film Critics Awards	Top 10 Films	The Outlaws	Won	
2017	37th Korean Association of Film Critics Awards	Best New Director	Kang Yoon-sung	Won	
2017	38th Blue Dragon Film Awards	Best New Director	Kang Yoon-sung	Nominated	
2017	38th Blue Dragon Film Awards	Best Technical Achievement-Stunts	The Outlaws	Nominated	
2017	38th Blue Dragon Film Awards	Best Film Editing	The Outlaws	Nominated	
2017	38th Blue Dragon Film Awards	Best Supporting Actor	Jin Seon-kyu	Won	
2018	9th Korea Film Reporters Association Film Awards (KOFRA)	Best Supporting Actor	Jin Seon-kyu	Won	
2018	54th Baeksang Arts Awards	Best Actor	Ma Dong-seok	Nominated	
2018	54th Baeksang Arts Awards	Best Supporting Actor	Jin Seon-kyu	Nominated	
2018	54th Baeksang Arts Awards	Best New Actor	Kim Sung-kyu	Nominated	
2018	54th Baeksang Arts Awards	Best New Actor	Heo Sung-tae	Nominated	
2018	54th Baeksang Arts Awards	Best New Director	Kang Yoon-sung	Won	
2018	54th Baeksang Arts Awards	Best Screenplay	Kang Yoon-sung	Nominated	
2018	23rd Chunsa Film Art Awards	Best Screenplay	Kang Yoon-sung	Nominated	
2018	23rd Chunsa Film Art Awards	Best New Director	Kang Yoon-sung	Won	
2018	23rd Chunsa Film Art Awards	Best Actor	Ma Dong-seok	Nominated	
2018	23rd Chunsa Film Art Awards	Best Supporting Actor	Jin Seon-kyu	Nominated	
2018	27th Buil Film Awards	Best New Director	Kang Yoon-sung	Nominated	
2018	55th Grand Bell Awards	Best New Director	Kang Yoon-sung	Nominated	
2018	55th Grand Bell Awards	Best Supporting Actor	Jin Seon-kyu	Nominated	
2018	55th Grand Bell Awards	Best Planning	The Outlaws	Nominated	
2018	2nd The Seoul Awards	Best Supporting Actor	Jin Seon-kyu	Nominated	
2018	2nd The Seoul Awards	Best New Actor	Kim Sung-kyu	Nominated	
2018	18th Director's Cut Awards	Best New Director	Kang Yoon-sung	Won	

== Sequels ==
The Roundup (2022)

A sequel of the film titled The Roundup directed by Lee Sang-yong was released on May 18, 2022. Ma Dong-seok, Choi Gwi-hwa, Park Ji-hwan, Heo Dong-won, and Ha Jun reprised their roles. The film became the highest-grossing film of the year surpassing 10 million ticket sales on the 25th day since its release. It also became the 3rd highest-grossing film and 9th most viewed film in South Korean cinema history.

The Roundup: No Way Out (2023)

The second sequel, The Roundup: No Way Out, released in 2023.

The Roundup: Punishment (2024)

The third sequel, The Roundup: Punishment, released in 2024.

== Remake ==
It was remade in India as Radhe by Prabhu Deva, starring Salman Khan in the title role.
