= Unstoppable (2018 film) =

2018 film by Kim Min-ho

- Theatrical release poster
- Hangul: 성난황소
- RR: Seongnanhwangso
- MR: Sŏngnanhwangso
- Directed by: Kim Min-ho
- Written by: Kim Min-ho
- Produced by: Park Joon-shik
- Starring: Ma Dong-seok; Song Ji-hyo; Kim Sung-oh; Kim Min-jae; Park Ji-hwan; Bae Noo-ri
- Production companies: Plusmedia Ent. B.A. Entertainment
- Distributed by: Showbox
- Release date: November 22, 2018
- Running time: 116 minutes
- Country: South Korea
- Language: Korean
- Box office: US$11.6 million

Unstoppable (Korean: 성난황소) is a 2018 South Korean action thriller film written and directed by Kim Min-ho. It stars Ma Dong-seok, Song Ji-hyo, Kim Sung-oh, Kim Min-jae, Park Ji-hwan and Bae Noo-ri. In the film, a former legendary gangster turned seafood distributor goes on a crusade to rescue his wife from a human trafficking ring.

Unstoppable was released on November 22, 2018.

== Plot ==
Kang Dong-cheol is a meek seafood distributor who tries to hit big bucks with various business opportunities that eventually go bust, losing a lot of money, much to the annoyance of his wife Ji-su. One evening, while trying to convince her about a new opportunity in the fishing industry with the supply of king crab and opening a new restaurant. Dong-cheol's car is rear-ended by the car of Gi-tae, a human trafficker, who is attracted to Ji-su and kidnaps her the next night. When Dong-cheol arrives home after work, he learns that Ji-soo is kidnapped, where he receives a bag full of money from Gi-tae in exchange for the "purchase" of his wife.

However, Gi-tae is unaware that Dong-cheol was a legendary fighter and gangster, now living a quiet life upon his wife's insistence. Dong-cheol, along with his friend Choon-sik and retired Inspector named Gomsajang, begins a search which leads them to a casino where they find that the gangsters are smuggling Lorazepam and plates from Jangseang port. They find the manager Park In-chang of "Business Club". Dong-cheol checks In-chang's car where he finds that In-chang was present at the time of Ji-su's kidnapping. Dong-cheol tries to nab In-chang but the latter escapes.

With the help of the police department, Dong-cheol meets and learns from a deceased wife's husband. The husband reveals that Gi-tae had offered him money in exchange to sell his wife, who was in coma. The husband reluctantly accepted and felt guilty for his actions, he then gives a file to Dong-cheol before committing suicide by jumping off the roof of the police headquarters. In the file Dong-cheol finds the business card of a finance company headed by Dae-sung, who is Gi-tae's associate (Dae-sung had given him an identical card previously when they accidentally crashed their car).

Dong-cheol confronts Dae-sung where he kidnaps him, which is witnessed by Gi-tae from the CCTV cameras. Gi-tae calls Dong-cheol and blackmails him to kill Dae-sung in exchange for Ji-su's survival. Dong-cheol strangles Dae-Sung to the point of unconsciousness, appearing to kill him. This convinces Gi-tae, who spares Ji-su, and tells Dong-cheol to bring the money. The trio revive Dae-sung and interrogate him, from whom they learn that the husbands and fathers of the trafficked girls are convinced into selling their wives or daughters in exchange for money.

They manage to steal the money from the police station (as Dong-cheol had given the bag to the police). Dong-cheol reaches Gangwon Province and defeats all of the syndicate's henchmen including In-chang and a car chases ensues between Gi-tae and Dong-cheol where Dong-cheol manages to defeat Gi-tae, hand him over to the cops and reunites with Ji-su, where he also testifies about the syndicate's activities. The king crab is delivered, where Dong-cheol, Ji-su, and Choon-sik inaugurate their restaurant and celebrate with a happy meal.

== Cast ==
=== Main ===
- Ma Dong-seok as Kang Dong-cheol
- Song Ji-hyo as Ji-soo

=== Supporting ===
- Kim Sung-oh as Gi-tae
- Kim Min-jae as Private Eye Kwon
- Park Ji-hwan as Choon-sik
- Bae Noo-ri as So-yeon
- Shim So-young as Auntie
- Park Gwang-jae as Giant
- Lee Sung-woo as Doo-sik
- Park Ji-hoon as Jak-doo

== Production ==
Principal photography began on May 4, 2018, and wrapped on August 3, 2018.

== Reception ==
On Rotten Tomatoes, Unstoppable has a score of 80%, an average rating of 5.9/10, based on five reviews.
