= The Bad Guys: Reign of Chaos =

2019 film by Son Young-ho

- US theatrical release poster
- Hangul: 나쁜 녀석들: 더 무비
- RR: Nappeun nyeoseokdeul: deo mubi
- MR: Nappŭn nyŏsŏktŭl: tŏ mubi
- Directed by: Son Yong-ho
- Written by: Son Yong-ho
- Based on: Bad Guys by Han Jung-hoon
- Produced by: Kim Su-jin; Yoon In-beom
- Starring: Ma Dong-seok; Kim Sang-joong; Kim Ah-joong; Jang Ki-yong
- Cinematography: Lee Jae-hyuk
- Edited by: Shin Min-kyung
- Music by: Mok Young-jin
- Production companies: CJ Entertainment; Bidangil Pictures
- Distributed by: CJ Entertainment
- Release date: September 11, 2019
- Running time: 114 minutes
- Country: South Korea
- Language: Korean
- Budget: ₩8.1 billion
- Box office: US$22.3 million

The Bad Guys: Reign of Chaos (Korean: 나쁜 녀석들) is a 2019 South Korean action film directed by Son Yong-ho and is based on the OCN drama series Bad Guys. Ma Dong-seok and Kim Sang-joong reprise their roles from the series, while Kim Ah-joong and Jang Ki-yong appear in new roles.

== Plot ==
During an inmate transportation, a truck collided with the prison transport bus. It is reveled that this collision was pre-planned and several policemen were attacked and killed by men in suits. A former gangster's boss named No Sang-sik is freed amongst others in the prison transport bus. After capturing some of the escaped prisoners, Oh Goo-tak, who is the former boss of an unusual special forces unit called "Crime Unit", is called by the Police Chief.

The Police Chief tells Oh Goo-tak that Sang-Sik was about to testify the real leader of the yakuza, and tells Oh Goo-tak to reassemble his unit of misfit to capture them. Oh Goo-tak hires Woong-Cheol, a muscleman for a crime syndicate serving time in prison, and Yoo-Sung, a former police officer serving time in prison, to capture them. It is revealed that Woong-cheol accepted this mission as he wants to settle a score with the gangster's boss for killing his best friend Nam Myeong-seok. The duo are promised a reduction of their prison sentences if they manage to capture the escapees. The unit soon manage to capture one of the prisoners named Kwak No-soon/Jessica, who later becomes a part of the unit as she has useful information which helps the team to close in one of the other escaped prisoners named Kim Chang-min.

The unit manages to track down Kim with the help of Jessica's criminal analysis on Kim's past escape routes. During the confrontation between the unit and Kim, Detective Choi arrested Kim and interfered with the unit's operation. Oh Goo-tak is als seen clutching in pain and incapacitated during the arrest. After admitting Oh Goo-tak to the hospital due to liver cancer, the unit manages to retrieve Kim from the police station and also other prisoners, including Sang-sik. They interrogate Sang-sik and learn that the yakuza leader's real name is Yoshihara. He reveals that Yoshihara had killed Myeong-seok for protesting against his drug operations. Sang-sik felt guilty and decided to testify against Yoshihara by listing about his operations in his diary.

However, the Police Chief, who is revealed to be Yoshihara's mole, forcibly retrieves the diary and Sang-sik, and leaves the unit to die in a fire accident which the unit manages to escape. Choi helps the unit to trace Yoshihara's location to a factory. Along with Woong-Cheol's friend, the unit attacks factory and defeated Yoshihara's goons. Woong-Cheol confronts Yoshihara and brutally thrashes him for Myeong-seok's death. Yoshihara and his men, along with the Police Chief are arrested by Choi team after the attack.

Oh Goo-tak once again is hospitalized but refused a matching liver transplant, gets encouraged by Woong-Cheol to have the transplant operation and in order to continue with police work. With the arrests of Yoshira's associates, the team's prison sentence are reduced. Kwak No-soon/Jessica is seen holding a seminar for the police officers while Woong-Cheol is hired for another mission in the mid-credit scene.

== Cast ==
- Ma Dong-seok as Park Woong-cheol
- Kim Sang-joong as Oh Gu-tak
- Kim Ah-joong as Kwak No-soon / Jessica
- Jang Ki-yong as Ko Yoo-sung
- Park Won-sang as Kim Chang-sik
- Park Hyung-soo as Park Sung-tae
- Ji Seung-Hyun as Nam Young-Gyu
- Bang Jae-ho as a police officer
- Kang Min-tae as a warehouse gangster

=== Cameo appearance ===
- Kang Ye-won as Yoo Mi-yeong
- Kong Jung-hwan as Nam Myeong-seok
- Kim Hye-yoon as Oh Ji-yun, Oh Gu-tak's daughter

== Production ==
Principal photography began on September 10, 2018 and wrapped on January 11, 2019.

== Box office ==
The cumulative total of 4,561,520 visitors and 39,483,632,444 won in cumulative sales. The break-even point turned out to be 2.55 million.
