= Amazon Bullseye =

2024 South Korean film by Kim Chang-ju

- Theatrical release poster
- Hangul: 아마존 활명수
- Hanja: 아마존 活命水
- RR: Amajon hwalmyeongsu
- MR: Amajon hwalmyŏngsu
- Directed by: Kim Chang-ju
- Written by: Bae Se-young
- Produced by: Choi Seon-jung; Lee Jin-eun; Lim Ji-young
- Starring: Ryu Seung-ryong; Jin Seon-kyu; Yeom Hye-ran; Go Kyung-pyo
- Cinematography: Hong Jae-sik
- Edited by: Kim Chang-ju
- Music by: Kim Tae-seong; Jeong Sang-woo
- Production companies: Rod Pictures; CJ Entertainment
- Distributed by: Barunson E&A
- Release date: October 30, 2024
- Running time: 113 minutes
- Country: South Korea
- Language: Korean
- Box office: US$6.5 million

Amazon Bullseye (Korean: 아마존 활명수; RR: Amajon hwalmyeongsu) is a 2024 South Korean comedy film directed by Kim Chang-ju, starring Ryu Seung-ryong, Jin Seon-kyu, Yeom Hye-ran, and Go Kyung-pyo. The film was released theatrically on October 30, 2024.

== Plot ==
Former national archery team medalist Jin-bong, now a top candidate for corporate downsizing, is given one last chance to prove himself by his company. His journey takes him deep into the Amazon, where he narrowly escapes death and encounters three warriors, Sika, Iva, and Walbu, each possessing divine archery skills. Believing he has found his way to survival, Jin-bong teams up with Korean-descended Boledoran interpreter Bbang-sik to bring the master archers back to Korea.

== Cast ==
- Ryu Seung-ryong as Cho Jin-bong
- Jin Seon-kyu as Bbang-sik
- Yeom Hye-ran as Cha Soo-hyun
- Jeon Seok-ho as Manager Park
- Lee Soon-won as Jeong-hwan
- Go Kyung-pyo as Director Choi
- Igor Pedroso as Sika
- Luan Brum as Iva
- J.B. Oliveira as Walbu
- Jo Woo-jin as Boss

== Production ==
=== Filming ===
Principal photography started in July 2023 and concluded in November 2023, with parts of the film shot on location in the Amazon rainforest.

== Reception ==
=== Box office ===
As of November 7, 2024, Amazon Bullseye has grossed $2,864,104 with a running total of 447,776 tickets sold.
