= Park Ji-hwan =

South Korean actor (born 1980)

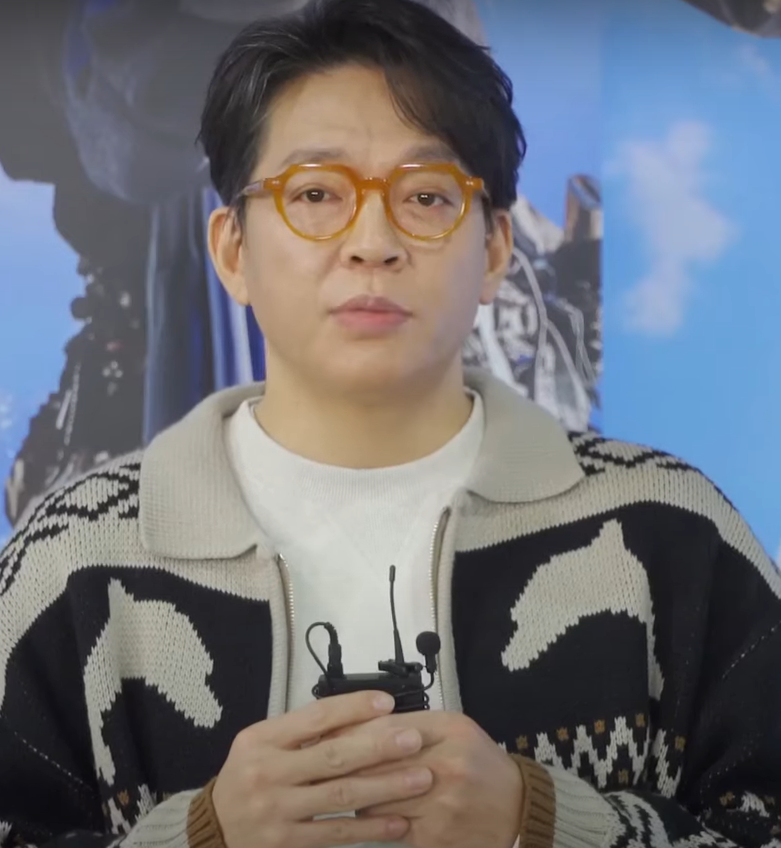
- Park in 2022
- Born: September 5, 1980 (age 45); South Korea
- Occupation: Actor
- Agent: Just Entertainment
- Spouse: Unknown (m. 2024)
- Children: 1

Korean name
- Hangul: 박지환
- RR: Bak Jihwan
- MR: Pak Chihwan

Park Ji-hwan (Korean: 박지환; born September 5, 1980) is a South Korean actor. He initially appeared in Yellow Hair (1999) and made his feature film debut in The City of Violence (2006). Since then, Park has performed in numerous movies and television dramas, including The Outlaws (2017), Untouchable (2017), and Black Dog (2019). Initially interested in a career in fashion design, Park changed track and decided to attend the Korean Academy of Film Arts. After working in many projects as a minor character, he has recently played more central roles, including that of a conflicted single father in Our Blues (2022).

== Personal life ==
On March 8, 2024, Just Entertainment announced that Park would be holding a wedding ceremony next month after already registering his marriage and having a son. The couple held the ceremony on April 27.

== Filmography ==
=== Film ===
Year	Title	Role	Notes	Ref.
2006	The City of Violence	teen gang boss		
2008	A Cheonggyecheon Dog	Min-soo		
2009	Exhausted	Ko-gal		
2009	A Blind River		Cameo	
2013	Anti Gas Skin	Bo-Sik		
2013	Way Back Home	Ha Tae-gwang		
2014	Virgin Theory: 7 Steps to Get on the Top	intoxicated man		
2014	Man in Love	"Gold Teeth"		
2014	My Dictator	leader of Advisory Team		
2014	Big Match	homeless man		
2014	Love Clinic	senior in medical school		
2015	The Shameless	Son Kyoung-Soo		
2015	Bad Man	Kim Joo-Won		
2015	The Tiger: An Old Hunter's Tale	Hwan		
2016	A Violent Prosecutor	Chul-goo		
2016	The Great Actor	Jung-bong		
2017	Warriors of the Dawn	Gorruta		
2017	The Outlaws	Jang Yi-soo		
2017	1987: When the Day Comes	detective		
2018	Unstoppable	Choon-sik		
2018	The Drug King	Wang Moon-ho		
2019	Svaha: The Sixth Finger	Jang-seok		
2019	The Battle: Roar to Victory	Shigeru Arayoshi		
2020	Beasts Clawing at Straws	Carp		
2021	Spiritwalker	Haengryeo		
2022	The Pirates: The Last Royal Treasure	A-gwi		
2022	The Roundup	Jang Yi-soo		
2022	Hansan: Rising Dragon	Na Dae-yong		
2023	The Roundup: No Way Out	Jang Yi-soo	Cameo	
2024	The Roundup: Punishment	Jang Yi-soo		
2024	Hijack 1971	Chief Kim	Cameo	
2024	Handsome Guys	Chief Choi		
2025	Boss	Pan-ho		
2026	Heartman: Rock and Love	Lee Won-dae		
2026	The King's Warden		Cameo	
2026	Tokyo Burst: Crime City	Jang Yi-soo	Japanese–Korean film	
TBA	The Roundup 5	Jang Yi-soo		

=== Television series ===
Year	Title	Role	Notes	Ref.
2016	Pied Piper	Heo Tae-woong		
2017–2018	Untouchable	Goo Do-soo		
2019	Touch Your Heart	Lee Doo-seob		
2019	Nokdu Flower	Kim Ga		
2019	Black Dog	Song Young-tae		
2020	The Good Detective	Kang Eun-Hee's ex-husband	Cameo (ep.4,14,16)	
2022	Our Blues	Jung In-gwon		
2023	My Lovely Boxer	Kim Oh-bok		
2023–2024	Gyeongseong Creature	Gap-pyeong	Season 1	
2024	The Frog	Jong-du		
2024	Seoul Busters	Mu Jung-nyok		
2024	Queen Woo	Mugol		
2025	A Hundred Memories	Noh Sang-sik		
2025	The Murky Stream	Mudeok		
2026	Sold Out on You	a celebrity guest	Cameo (ep. 1)	

=== Television shows ===
Year	Title	Role	Notes	Ref.
2021	House on Wheels: For Rent	Cast Member	Spin-off of House on Wheels; with The Pirates 2 cast	
2022–2023	Europe Outside Your Tent	Cast Member	Season 1 and 3	

== Awards and nominations ==
Name of the award ceremony, year presented, category, nominee of the award, and the result of the nomination
Award ceremony	Year	Category	Nominee / Work	Result	Ref.
APAN Star Awards	2022	Best Supporting Actor	Our Blues	Nominated	
Baeksang Arts Awards	2023	Best Supporting Actor – Film	The Roundup	Nominated	
Blue Dragon Film Awards	2022	Best Supporting Actor	The Roundup	Nominated	
Buil Film Awards	2022	Best Supporting Actor	The Roundup	Nominated	
Chunsa Film Art Awards	2022	Best Supporting Actor	The Roundup	Won	
Grand Bell Awards	2022	Best Supporting Actor	The Roundup	Nominated	
Grand Bell Awards	2022	People's Choice Award	The Roundup	Won	
