= The Roundup: No Way Out =

2023 film by Lee Sang-yong

- Promotional poster
- Hangul: 범죄도시3
- Hanja: 犯罪都市3
- Lit.: Crime City 3
- RR: Beomjoedosi3
- MR: Pŏmjoedosi3
- Directed by: Lee Sang-yong
- Written by: Kim Min-seong; Cha Woo-jin
- Produced by: Ma Dong-seok
- Starring: Ma Dong-seok; Lee Joon-hyuk; Munetaka Aoki
- Cinematography: Lee Hyun
- Edited by: Kim Seon-min
- Music by: Mok Young-jin
- Production companies: Bigpunch Pictures; Hong Film; B.A. Entertainment
- Distributed by: ABO Entertainment
- Release date: May 31, 2023
- Running time: 105 minutes
- Country: South Korea
- Language: Korean
- Box office: US$83.4 million

The Roundup: No Way Out (Korean: 범죄도시3; RR: Beomjoedosi3) is a 2023 South Korean action crime film directed by Lee Sang-yong, starring Ma Dong-seok, Lee Joon-hyuk and Munetaka Aoki. It is the third installment of The Roundup series and the sequel to The Roundup (2022). The film is based on a real-life 2017–2018 illegal drug smuggling case in South Korea involving methamphetamine, which was caught through a collaborative effort of South Korea, Japan and Taiwan.

The Roundup: No Way Out was released theatrically on May 31, 2023. A sequel, The Roundup: Punishment, was screened at the 74th Berlin International Film Festival on February 23, 2024.

== Plot ==
After a promotion, Detective Ma Seok-do and his team join the Metropolitan Investigation Unit. Their first major case involves the mysterious death of a woman named Go Sun-hee. An autopsy reveals she had a new, potent drug called "Hiper" in her system. Ma's investigation leads him to a local nightclub, where he uncovers a connection to a yakuza member named Hiroshi, who is supplying the drug from Incheon. Ma's team successfully apprehends Hiroshi and seizes a significant shipment of 20 kilos of Hiper. However, their victory is short-lived. A corrupt police captain, Joo Sung-chul, orchestrates an ambush, steals the confiscated drugs, and kills Hiroshi to cover his tracks. It is revealed that Joo is working for a powerful criminal syndicate known as the White Shark Clan. The theft of the Hiper angers the original Japanese yakuza owners, who dispatch a ruthless and skilled hitman named Ricky to Korea to reclaim their product.

As Ma Seok-do closes in on another supplier named Tomo, Ricky assassinates the man, sparking a violent turf war between the hitman and the corrupt cop. Ma finds himself caught in the middle of this escalating conflict. He sets up a sting operation on a yacht to recover the drugs and trap Joo Sung-chul, using an informant named Chorong. The plan goes awry when Joo double-crosses everyone, making a separate deal with Ricky. Ma Seok-do is captured and taken to a remote location by the yakuza hitman. After a brutal interrogation, Ma manages to turn the tables and overpower his captor. Using a hidden tracker, he follows the stolen Hiper to Joo Sung-chul's office for a final confrontation. The police subsequently move in, arresting Joo and dismantling the yakuza network, allowing Ma and his team to celebrate another hard-won victory.

A mid-credits scene sets up the next sequel, showing Ma Seok-do recruiting the informant Jang Yi-soo for a new investigation.

== Cast ==
=== Main ===
- Ma Dong-seok as Ma Seok-do, Lieutenant of the Seoul Police Agency Metropolitan Investigation.
- Lee Joon-hyuk as Joo Sung-cheol (Japanese: チュ・ソンチョル, Hepburn: Chu Sonchoru), a dirty cop and the Captain of Seoul Guryong Police Station Narcotics Investigation.
- Munetaka Aoki as Ricky (Japanese: リッキー, Hepburn: Rikkī) Ichijo-gumi's Gang Leader.

=== Supporting ===
==== Metropolitan Investigation Unit ====
- Lee Beom-soo as Jang Tae-soo, Captain of the Seoul Police Agency Metropolitan Investigation.
- Kim Min-jae as Kim Man-jae, Seok-do's subordinate detective of the Seoul Police Agency Metropolitan Investigation.
- Lee Ji-hoon as Yang Jong-soo, a detective sergeant of Seoul Police Agency Metropolitan Investigation.
- Kim Do-geon as Jung David, a rookie detective of Seoul Police Agency Metropolitan Investigation

==== Ma Seok-do's aid ====
- Ko Kyu-pil as Cherry (Chorong), a White Shark Gang member and Used Car Dealer.
- Jeon Seok-ho as Kim Yang-ho, Good Distribution Boss.

==== Bukbu Police Station ====
- Ryu Sung-hyun as Jung Gyung-sik, Captain of the Incheon Bukbu Police Station Narcotics Investigation.
- Choi Dong-gu as Hwang Dong-goo a detective of the Incheon Bukbu Police Station Narcotics Investigation.
- Lee Se-ho as Gong Tae-il, a detective of the Incheon Bukbu Police Station Narcotics Investigation

==== Guryong Police Station (Villain) ====
- Han Kyu-won as Kim Yong-guk, Joo Sung-cheol's subordinate detective of the Gyeonggi Guryong Police Station Narcotics Investigation.
- Choi Woo-jun as Lee Kang-ho, Joo Sung-cheol's subordinate detective of the Gyeonggi Guryong Police Station Narcotics Investigation.

==== Ichiji-gumi's Japan Chapter (Villain) ====
- Hong Joon-young as Maha (Japanese: マハ, Hepburn: Maha), Ichijo-gumi's Gang member and Ricky's subordinate.
- Lee Tae-kyu as Martha (Japanese: マーサ, Hepburn: Masa), Ichijo-gumi's Gang member and Ricky's subordinate.

==== Ichiji-gumi's Korea Chapter (Villain and Dissolution) ====
- An Se-ho as Ryo Tomokawa (Japanese: 友川 亮, Hepburn: Tomokawa Ryō), Ichijo-gumi's Korean Branch Manager.
- Kang Yoon as Hiroshi Kimu (Japanese: キム ヒロシ Hepburn: Kimu Hiroshi), Ichijo-gumi's Gang Member and Tomokawa Ryo's subordinate.

==== Cyber Club ====
- Bae Noo-ri as Mimi (Japanese: ミミ), a Cyber Club's MD.

==== Chinese Drug Gang Member ====
- Shim Young-eun as Chairman Jin, China Narcotics Gang's Boss.
- Kim Ki-ho as President Baek, Chairman Jin's Confidant.

==== Club Orange ====
- Choi Kwang-je as Lee Sang-cheol, Club Orange's Boss.

=== Others ===
- Park Sang-nam as Club Orange's MD
- Shin Hyun-yong as Automatic Door
- Kim Won-kyung as Yasuda Ryuichi (Japanese: 安田 龍一, Hepburn: Ryuichi Yasuda), Tomokawa Ryo's subordinate.
- Park Sang-won as Hayashi Yoshiaki (Japanese: 林 義明, Hepburn: Yoshiaki Hayashi), Tomokawa Ryo's subordinate.
- Gong Teyu as Kimura Shokichi (Japanese: 木村 翔吉, Hepburn: Shokichi Kimura), Ricky's subordinate.
- Park Joon-hyuk as Ricky's subordinate.
- Gong Kyeong-bae as Ricky's subordinate.
- Kim Min as Ricky's subordinate.
- Choi Won-seok as Ricky's subordinate.
- Jeon Ah-hee as a forensic doctor
- Lee Jin-han as Tattooed man 1
- Kim Tae-yoon as Tattooed man 2
- Baek Nam-jun as Tattooed man 3
- Park Tae-san as Tattooed man 4
- Kang Hee-jae as a Cyber Club Prayer Yakuza
- Kang Han-byeol as a Yacht interpreter Yakuza
- Hong Lee-joo as Sang-cheol's girlfriend.
- Bae So-young as Sang-cheol's junior.
- Park Sang-nam as a Club Orange's MD.
- Go Gun-han as Speed, a Club Orange's staff.
- You In-hyuk as Candy, a Club Orange's staff.
- Cha Jae-hyun as Yellow Hair, a Club Orange's staff.
- Yeon Ye-rim as a party girl from Club Orange
- Lee Hye-ji as a party girl from Club Orange
- Lee Jae-sung as a Club Orange Gang Prayer
- Lee Jae-hyuk as a Club Orange Gang Prayer
- Seo Moon-ho as a Seoul Guryong Police Station Watchtower 1
- Han Ki-chang as a Seoul Guryong Police Station Watchtower 2
- Moon Kyung-rin as a Tomo Hotel Yakuza
- Kim Lee-woo as Golden Hair, Ichizo-gumi's Vice-Chairman and Ichizō's Subordinate.
- Shim Ha-neuri as a Ichizō's Interpreter
- Lee Myung-ro as Tomo betrays Subordinate 1
- Jung Ho-jin as Tomo betrays Subordinate 2
- Jung Woo-tak as Tomo betrays Subordinate 3
- Jung Hyun-ok as Tomo betrays Subordinate 4

=== Special appearance ===
- Jun Kunimura as Ichizō Yoshio (Japanese: 一条 吉雄 Hepburn: Ichijō Yoshio), Ichijo-gumi's chairman
- Park Ji-hwan as Jang Yi-soo (Chinese: 張夷帥, Zhang Yishuai), Cookie Video

== Production ==
In May, 2022, Lee Joon-hyuk was reported to play the new antagonist in the third installment of Crime City series. In an interview in June 2022, Lee Sang-yong revealed that he is currently auditioning for Crime City 3. Principal photography began on July 20, 2022. On November 15, 2022, Ma Dong-seok posted on Instagram that the filming of The Roundup: No Way Out has ended.

== Awards and nominations ==
Name of the award ceremony, year presented, category, nominee of the award, and the result of the nomination
Award ceremony	Year	Category	Nominee / Work	Result	Ref.
Buil Film Awards	2023	Best Supporting Actor	Ko Kyu-pil	Nominated	
Grand Bell Awards	2023	Best Supporting Actor	Ko Kyu-pil	Nominated	
Blue Dragon Film Awards	2023	Best Supporting Actor	Lee Joon-hyuk	Nominated	
