= The Roundup (2022 film) =

2022 film by Lee Sang-yong

- Theatrical release poster
- Hangul: 범죄도시2
- Hanja: 犯罪都市2
- Lit.: Crime City 2
- RR: Beomjoedosi2
- MR: Pŏmjoedosi2
- Directed by: Lee Sang-yong
- Written by: Kim Min-seong
- Produced by: Ma Dong-seok; Kim Hong-baek; Jang Won-seok
- Starring: Ma Dong-seok; Son Suk-ku; Choi Gwi-hwa; Park Ji-hwan
- Cinematography: Ju Seong-rim
- Edited by: Kim Sun-min
- Music by: Kim Tae-seong
- Production companies: Hong Film; B.A. Entertainment; Big Punch Pictures
- Distributed by: ABO Entertainment; Megabox
- Release date: May 18, 2022
- Running time: 106 minutes
- Country: South Korea
- Language: Korean
- Budget: ₩10.5 billion
- Box office: US$101.2 million

The Roundup (Korean: 범죄도시2; RR: Beomjoedosi2) is a 2022 South Korean action crime film directed by Lee Sang-yong, starring Ma Dong-seok, Son Suk-ku, Choi Gwi-hwa, and Park Ji-hwan. It is the second installment of The Roundup series and the sequel to The Outlaws. The film was released theatrically on May 18, 2022 in IMAX format. Set 4 years after the previous film, Detective Ma Seok-do travels to Vietnam to extradite a suspect, but comes across some gruesome murders of Korean tourists by a vicious killer named Kang Hae-sung.

The film became the highest performing South Korean release since the COVID-19 pandemic. It grossed $101.2 million worldwide, becoming the highest-grossing Korean film of 2022 and the third-highest-grossing Korean film of all time. A sequel The Roundup: No Way Out was released in May 2023.

== Plot ==
Four years after the sweeping operation in Garibong-dong, Detective Ma Seok-do and Captain Jeon Il-man head to Ho Chi Minh City, Vietnam to extradite a Korean criminal, Yoo Jong-hoon. Jong-hoon tells them that he turned himself in because his friend Lee Jong-du had tried to kill him. Ma and Il-man investigate Jong-du's hideout, only to find him dead; after further interrogating Jong-hoon they learn about the duo's involvement with Kang Hae-sang, a vicious killer who has kidnapped and killed Korean tourists before extorting their families for money, with his latest victim a wealthy young entrepreneur named Choi Yong-gi, the son of Choi Choon-baek, a business tycoon.

Ma, Il-man and Park Chang-su (the resident officer at the consulate) dig into the hideout's garden, where they find Yong-gi's body, but the local police order them to drop the investigation. Despite the setback, Ma and Il-man learn from other Korean criminals that Yong-gi's father has sent mercenaries to kill Kang in revenge for his son's death. Kang arrives at his hideout and kills all the mercenaries waiting for him, discovering that Choon-baek had sent them. Kang ambushes Ma and Il-man as they come to investigate, wounding Il-man before escaping. Ma and Il-man are deported back to Korea, where they learn that Kang has left Vietnam and may be on his way to Korea to confront Choon-baek.

Ma interrogates former Cobra Gang leader Jang I-soo, who has survived the Chinatown gang war and is now running an export business with criminal connections. From him, Ma learns about a recently arrived smuggling boat and they check the CCTV footage at Gongping port, confirming that Kang has arrived in the country. In response, Choon-baek announces a hefty bounty for his men to bring Kang in alive. After learning that Kang's case has been handed over to Foreign Affairs, Ma and Il-man convince their superiors to give them more time and receive a week deadline to catch him. Kang discreetly arrives at Yong-gi's funeral, where he kidnaps Choon-baek. Kang then contacts Choon-baek's wife Kim In-sook and demands money in exchange for his return.

In-sook cooperates with Ma and his team, and they set up a plan to rescue Choon-baek and catch Kang. Ma recruits a reluctant Jang I-soo to be In-sook's driver and the two follow Kang's instructions with the ransom money in possession, ultimately being sent on a wild goose chase while being shadowed by Kang's two accomplices. Meanwhile, Ma's colleague Dong-gyun finds Kang's hideout and rescues Choon-baek, but is stabbed by Kang who escapes after seeing the police arrive. After Kang calls off the ransom pick up, his accomplices decide to continue on their own, leading Jang I-soo to drop In-sook off at a shopping complex and drive off with the money. Ma and his team manage to subdue Kang's two accomplices before they can harm In-sook.

With the plan gone awry, Kang decides to escape from Korea with the money that Jang I-soo took. He finds Jang I-soo's smuggler contact and learns that Jang I-soo is planning to escape to China by boat. At the port, Kang intimidates Jang I-soo into giving him the money, and boards a bus to escape the police in the area. Following a tip-off by Jang I-soo, Ma boards the bus while it is stuck in a tunnel, and after a fight he defeats Kang and has him arrested. In the aftermath, Ma and his team celebrate solving the case.

== Cast ==
=== Main ===
- Ma Dong-seok as Ma Seok-do, Lieutenant of the Major Crimes Unit at Geumcheon Police Station.
- Son Suk-ku as Kang Hae-sang, a vicious criminal who has been kidnapping and murdering Koreans in Vietnam.
- Choi Gwi-hwa as Jeon Il-man, Captain of the Major Crimes Unit at Geumcheon Police Station.

=== Supporting ===
- Park Ji-hwan as Jang Yi-soo (Chinese: 張夷帥, Zhang Yishuai), a tour agent and former gangster.
- Heo Dong-won as Oh Dong-gyun, Detective Sergeant of the Major Crimes Unit at Geumcheon Police Station.
- Ha Jun as Kang Hong-seok, a detective of the Geumcheon Police Station Major Crimes Unit.
- Jung Jae-kwang as Kim Sang-hoon, the Rookie Detective of the Geumcheon Police Station Major Crimes Unit.
- Nam Moon-chul as Choi Choon-baek, Choi Yong-gi's father and a business tycoon.
- Park Ji-young as Kim In-sook, Choi Yong-gi's mother and Choi Choon-baek's wife.
- Lee Joo-won as Park Chang-soo, Consulate General of South Korea in Ho Chi Minh City.
- Eum Moon-suk as Jang Ki-cheol, Kang Hae-sang's subordinate, Jang Soon-cheol's brother.
- Kim Chan-hyung as Jang Soon-cheol, Kang Hae-sang's subordinate, Jang Ki-cheol's brother.
- Lee Kyu-won as Doo-ik, Kang Hae-sang's subordinate.
- Cha Woo-jin as Choi Yong-gi, Choi Choon-baek's son who was kidnapped and murdered by Kang Hae-sang.
- Jeon Jin-oh as Yoo Jong-hoon, a self-surrendered criminal who is the reason why Ma and Jeon initially goes to Vietnam.

=== Special appearance ===
- Jung In-gi as Chief of Geumcheon Police Station

== Inspiration ==
The plot is loosely based on the story of Yoon Cheol-wan, a missing South Korean soldier who was a suspected victim of a serial kidnapping and murder case that took place in the Philippines between 2008 and 2012, in which several other Koreans who disappeared were among the victims of the case. Unlike the film in which the perpetrators are punished, the real incident has not been solved completely due to the unconfirmed number of victims and the uncertainty of Yoon's final fate. The real-life perpetrators of the case were all sentenced to life imprisonment for only a few out of all the killings they committed.

== Production ==
The film was scheduled to be filmed in Vietnam in March 2020, but due to COVID-19 pandemic, filming schedule in Vietnam was postponed and the domestic part was filmed first. Later, it was decided to complete the post-production in Korea by mobilizing local filming, sets, and CG. Filming concluded in June 2021. The net production cost of the film was about 10.5 billion won. Including marketing and promotional costs, the total production cost was about 13 billion won.

== Release ==
The Roundup was pre-sold to 132 countries around the world ahead of its release in South Korea. North America, Taiwan, Mongolia, Hong Kong, Singapore, and the Philippines were preparing for the simultaneous release with Korea. It was released on 2,521 screens on May 18, 2022, in South Korea.

The film was released in the Philippines on June 22, 2022. The local release was made possible by the partnership between South Korean content investment and distribution company Laon Company Plus (led by CEO Hongkyu Cho) and Philippines-based content production and distribution company Glimmer Studio (formerly Glimmer Production) owned by Grace Lee.

The film was banned from screening in Vietnam by censorship authorities on the grounds that "there are too many violent scenes" while some speculated that it might be because of the negative portrayal of Vietnamese Ho Chi Minh City in the movie.

== Reception ==
=== Box office ===
The Roundup opened with a record 467,525 admissions, which is the highest opening for a film released in South Korea in the last 882 days since Ashfall. It is also the best opening for a Korean film in 2022 so far and post-pandemic era. The film crossed 1 million cumulative admissions in 2 days of release, by recording 1,016,695 cumulative viewers. It surpassed 1.5 million viewers on 3rd day of its release, and 2 million on 4th day, thereby becoming the fastest film to achieve the record since 2020 film Deliver Us from Evil, which achieved the feat in first weekend. It crossed 3 million viewers on 5th day of release, this is achieved in the shortest time among Korean films since Parasite (2019). Then it went on to cross 5 million cumulative audiences in 10 days, which is fastest in last 882 days since Ashfall, which also registered 5 million on the 10th day of its release on December 28, 2019. Continuing its success it registered 10 million viewers on 25th day, thereby becoming the first film of the year 2022 and first Korean film since Parasite (2019) to garner 10 million admissions. It surpassed 11 million viewers in 31 days, and then surpassed 11,565,479 theatregoers of Train to Busan on the 35th day of its release by gathering 11,572,603 audiences. It created another record by surpassing 12 million viewers in 40 days and was placed 9th in the List of highest-grossing domestic films by admissions.

As of July 10, 2022 it is the top-grossing film of the year 2022 in South Korea, with gross of US$100,064,909 and 12,592,880 admissions. And, as per Box Office Mojo it ranks 21 at 2022 Worldwide Box Office.

=== Critical response ===
The review aggregator website Rotten Tomatoes reported a 96% approval rating based on 25 reviews, with an average rating of 7.7/10.

James Marsh of South China Morning Post gave 4 stars out of 5, and praised Ma Dong-seok's performance as "a truly unique, utterly captivating leading man." Baek Geon-woo in his review for Oh My News praised the performance of Ma Dong-seok and described his character as "the Korean version of the 'superhero' shown in the West." Xports' Kim Ye-eun appreciated the direction of the action sequences presented by the main character Ma Seok-do and the villain Kang Hae-sang. Whang Yee Ling of The Straits Times rated the film 3 out of 5 and wrote, "Lee and his returning teammates share slapstick camaraderie, and their investigation maintains rambunctious energy to climax in a thrilling extended car chase." Dennis Harvey writing for Variety appreciated the direction of Lee Sang-yong and praised the comic elements of the film, stating "the movie manages with deceptive ease, maximizing both humor and extreme harm."

=== Criticism ===
Several organizations dedicated to the rights of disabled people criticized the film for fueling prejudices by depicting a character with a mental disability as a danger to the public: a scene in the beginning of the film where a man escaped from a mental hospital, threatens the police and public with a knife as he holds two women hostage inside a supermarket. On 7 July 2022, group of seven organizations, including the Korea Association for Mental Disorders and the Research Institute of the Differently Abled Person's Rights in Korea, held a press event in front of the National Human Rights Commission of Korea building in Seoul, calling on authorities to ban screenings of the film. Responding to the matter, the production crew stated that they had no intention of giving off that sort of message.

== Sequel ==
A sequel under title The Roundup: No Way Out, directed by Lee Sang-yong and produced by Big Punch Pictures, Hong film and B.A. Entertainment, with the cast of Ma Dong-seok, Lee Jun-hyuk, Aoki Munetaka, Lee Beom-soo, Kim Min-jae, Jeon Seok-ho, and Ko Kyu-pil began filming on July 20, 2022. It was released in 2023.

== Accolades ==
Name of the award ceremony, year presented, category, nominee of the award, and the result of the nomination
Award ceremony	Year	Category	Nominee / Work	Result	Ref.
Baeksang Arts Awards	2023	Best New Director	Lee Sang-yong	Nominated	
Baeksang Arts Awards	2023	Best Actor	Ma Dong-seok	Nominated	
Baeksang Arts Awards	2023	Best Supporting Actor	Park Ji-hwan	Nominated	
Blue Dragon Film Awards	2022	Audiences Choice Award for Most Popular Film	The Roundup	Won	
Blue Dragon Film Awards	2022	Technical Award	Huh Myung-haeng, Yoon Seong-min	Won	
Blue Dragon Film Awards	2022	Best Editing	Kim Seon-min	Nominated	
Blue Dragon Film Awards	2022	Best New Director	Lee Sang-yong	Nominated	
Blue Dragon Film Awards	2022	Best Supporting Actor	Park Ji-hwan	Nominated	
Buil Film Awards	2022	Best New Actor	Son Suk-ku	Nominated	
Buil Film Awards	2022	Best Supporting Actor	Park Ji-hwan	Nominated	
Chunsa Film Art Awards	2022	Audiences Choice Award for Most Popular Film	The Roundup	Won	
Chunsa Film Art Awards	2022	Best Supporting Actor	Park Ji-hwan	Won	
Chunsa Film Art Awards	2022	Best New Director	Lee Sang-yong	Won	
Chunsa Film Art Awards	2022	Best Supporting Actor	Son Suk-ku	Nominated	
Grand Bell Awards	2022	Best Cinematography	Ju Seong-rim	Won	
Grand Bell Awards	2022	Best Film Editing	Kim Seon-min	Won	
Grand Bell Awards	2022	People's Choice Award	Park Ji-hwan	Won	
Grand Bell Awards	2022	Best New Director	Lee Sang-yong	Nominated	
Grand Bell Awards	2022	Best Supporting Actor	Park Ji-hwan	Nominated	
Grand Bell Awards	2022	Best Supporting Actor	Son Suk-ku	Nominated	
Korean Association of Film Critics Awards	2022	Best New Actor	Son Suk-ku	Won	
Korean Film Producers Association Award	2022	Best Actor	Ma Dong-seok	Won	
Sitges International Fantastic Film Festival	2022	Focus Asia People's Choice Award	The Roundup	Won	
Women in Film Korea Festival	2022	Best Technology	Kim Sun-min	Won	
