= Cyber Terror Response Center =

- 사이버테러대응센터

Agency overview
- Formed: 2000
- Preceding agency: Computer Crime Investigation Squad (1997)
- Jurisdiction: South Korea
- Headquarters: Korean National Police Agency main building, Seoul
- Employees: 900+ (as of 2008)
- Agency executive: Director
- Parent agency: Korean National Police Agency

Footnotes
- Investigates cybercrimes, Cyberterrorism, and provides digital forensics services to the Korean police.

Cyber Terror Response Center (abbr. CTRC, also from 2007 known as NETAN, from net+an, an meaning safety in Korean language) is a cybercrime section of the Korean National Police Agency in South Korea.

The Center was established in 2000, from the Computer Crime Investigation Squad (itself established in 1997). It is headquartered in the KNPA main building.

== Services ==
As of July 2008, the Center had over 900 employees; majority of them police officers specializing in the cybercrime investigations.

The Center investigates cybercrimes, incidents of cyber terrorism, and provides digital forensics services to the Korean police. As of 2012, the Center website stated that each year, about 80,000 incidents of cybercrimes are reported in South Korea; and cites a 2006 breakdown into fraud (41%), intrusion and malware (23%), online defamation (10%), illegal web content (8%), copyright violations (3%) and other crimes (15%).

Examples of the Center's actions include a campaign to reduce online slander and cyber bullying in 2008 (launched in the aftermath of the suicide of an actress Choi Jin-sil), a raid on Korean Google offices to investigate privacy issues concerning Google's Street View service in 2010, cracking down on online discussions about bomb making in 2011, and busting an illegal online gambling operation in 2012.

== International connections ==
The Center hosts an international conference, the Annual Symposium on Cyber Terror (or International Symposium on Cybercrime Response), inaugurated together with the Center in 2000. The Center has numerous international connections, from Interpol to hotlines and memorandums of understandings with a number of foreign cybercrime investigations agencies.

== See also ==
- Internet censorship in South Korea
