= Badland Hunters =

2024 South Korean film

- Promotional poster
- Hangul: 황야
- Hanja: 荒野
- Lit.: Wilderness
- RR: Hwangya
- MR: Hwangya
- Directed by: Heo Myung-haeng
- Screenplay by: Kim Bo-tong; Kwak Jae-min
- Produced by: Byun Seung-min; Ma Dong-seok
- Starring: Ma Dong-seok; Lee Hee-joon; Lee Jun-young; Roh Jeong-eui
- Cinematography: Byun Bong-sun
- Edited by: Nam Na-yeong; Ha Mi-ra
- Music by: Kim Dong-wook
- Production companies: Lotte Entertainment; Climax Studio; Big Punch Pictures; Nova Film
- Distributed by: Netflix
- Release date: January 26, 2024
- Running time: 107 minutes
- Country: South Korea
- Language: Korean

Badland Hunters (Korean: 황야) is a 2024 South Korean post-apocalyptic action film directed by Heo Myung-haeng in his directorial debut. A standalone sequel to Concrete Utopia (2023), it follows characters trying to survive in post-earthquake Seoul, now an orderless wasteland, three years after the original film's events. Producer Byun Seung-min is the only key crew member to return from the original film.

Starring Ma Dong-seok, Lee Hee-joon, Lee Jun-young, and Roh Jeong-eui, the film is an original Netflix production and was released on January 26, 2024.

== Plot ==
In a post-apocalyptic Seoul, (Note: The Earthquake that devastated Seoul in the first film is stated to have happened three years prior.) Nam-san, a relentless wasteland hunter, along with his friend Choi Ji-wan and other survivors, are living a hard life in their village. Nam-san and Ji-wan navigate the desolate wastelands and scavenge for resources to sustain their community. Trouble ensues when Su-na, who is from their village, is kidnapped by a rogue scientist, Dr. Yang Gi-su, who has been illegally experimenting with making humans immortal by injecting them with a certain serum, which has led to the death of many teenagers.

Gi-su needed more supplies for the serum, and he had set up a network to bring more teenagers to his camp, in an apartment complex. (Note: The apartment complex is the same as the one the original film was set in.) Nam-san, Ji-wan, and Lee Eun-ho, a military sergeant of the camp, discover Gi-su's experiments and go to rescue Su-na. It is revealed that Gi-su had been conducting experiments to revive his daughter So-yeon, who had died around the time when Seoul became a wasteland.

Nam-san, Ji-wan, and Eun-ho arrive at the camp and fight with mutant soldiers. They manage to rescue Su-na, while Gi-su escapes with So-yeon's body in a suitcase. However, he is surrounded by a mob of people, who are prepared to beat him to death. While shooting at the crowd, he accidentally damages the suitcase, killing So-yeon. Nam-san kills Gi-su and returns to his village, along with Su-na and Ji-wan.

== Cast ==
- Ma Dong-seok as Nam-san, a relentless wasteland hunter
- Lee Hee-joon as Yang Gi-su, a doctor who survived the catastrophe
- Lee Jun-young as Choi Ji-wan, Nam-san's trusted partner
- Roh Jeong-eui as Han Su-na, a bold girl who is kidnapped by Gi-su
- Ahn Ji-hye as Lee Eun-ho, a special forces sergeant
- Jang Young-nam as a teacher
- Lee Han-joo as Lee Joo-ye, a teenage girl kidnapped by Gi-su
- Park Hyo-jun as Tiger, a former rival of Nam-san
- Seong Byeong-suk as Su-na's grandmother

== Production ==
Planning for the film began after the production of Concrete Utopia, on November 14, 2021. Filming began on February 15, 2022, and finished on May 18, 2022.

On November 2, 2023, Netflix confirmed that the film was directed by martial arts director Heo Myung-haeng and produced by Climax Studios, with Big Punch Pictures and Nova film as co-producers.

An Ji-hye, who plays special forces sergeant Eun-ho, performed 99% of her action scenes in the film.

== Release ==
As per KOFIC's integrated computer network for movie theater admissions announcements, Badland Hunters was released on January 26, 2024, on Netflix.

== Reception ==
=== Critical response ===
On the review aggregator Rotten Tomatoes, the film has an approval rating of 75%, based on 20 reviews, with an average rating of 6/10.

Romey Norton, writing in Ready Steady Cut, rated the film 4/5 and wrote, "Badland Hunters is thrilling from beginning to end, filled with action, danger, brutality, and a tiny bit of humor to take the edge off." Christopher Cross of Asynchronous Media rated it 3.5/5 and said, "Badland Hunters [...] has just enough momentum to string together a series of fisticuffs and close-quarters combat that will elate any action fan." Roger Moore of Movie Nation graded the film 2.5/4 and opined, "The story is recycled and nothing that should hold the interest of anybody who's seen a single post-apocalyptic zombie movie", adding, "but the action beats are first-rate, the fight-choreography next level and the trash talk...is top drawer B-movie pithy." Whang Yee Ling of The Straits Times rated the film 3/5 and wrote, "Don Lee is true to form, pummelling bad guys in an adequate if unsurprising star vehicle."

=== Viewership ===
Badland Hunters ranked first globally in the Netflix movie category, just one day after its release, and from January 22 to 28, with 14.3 million views, was in first place in the Global Top 10 weekly list of the most-watched Netflix TV films (non-English). It retained this position in the following weeks, from January 29 to February 4, with 18.1 million views, and from February 5 to 11, with 6.1 million views.
