= Kim Min-jae (actor, born 1979) =

South Korean actor (born 1979)

- 김민재
- Born: March 20, 1979 (age 47); Anyang, Gyeonggi-do, South Korea
- Occupation: Actor
- Years active: 2000–present
- Agent: iNKODE

Korean name
- Hangul: 김민재
- RR: Gim Minjae
- MR: Kim Minjae

Kim Min-jae (Korean: 김민재; born March 20, 1979) is a South Korean actor. He starred in TV series such as Reset (2014), Spy (2015), The Village: Achiara's Secret (2015), and Feel Good to Die (2018).

== Career ==
After debuting in 2000 as part of a small theatre company in Daegu, Kim decided to try his luck in Seoul. While on the set of Lee Chang-dong’s Secret Sunshine (2007), he was inspired to take the entrance exam for the Korea National University of Arts to study film directing. By the time he graduated, Kim realized directing wasn’t for him and resumed his acting career. After a few minor roles in A Little Pond (2010), Poetry (2010), and The Spies (2012), Kim gained recognition for his portrayal of an incorruptible detective in Ryoo Seung-wan’s crime drama The Unjust (2010). Following more supporting roles in blockbusters like Ode to My Father (2014), The King (2016), and The Battleship Island (2017), as well as appearances in critically-acclaimed films The Truth Beneath (2015) and Mothers (2018), Kim joined the main cast of first-time writer-director Kim Min-ho's crime action film Unstoppable along with Don Lee and Song Ji-hyo.

== Filmography ==
=== Film ===
Year	Title	Role	Notes/Ref.
2007	Secret Sunshine	outdoor prayer volunteer	
2008	Fate	waiter in Mi-jin's room	
2008	The Good, the Bad, the Weird	member of Gwi group	
2010	A Little Pond	cop	
2010	I Came from Busan	Woo-chan	
2010	The Unjust	Detective Lee	
2010	Poetry	Detective Kim	
2011	Moby Dick	Kim Yong-sung	
2011	The Cat	animal rescue administrator	
2011	Countdown	office staff	
2011	Sector 7	helicopter pilot	
2011	Perfect Game	Bong-soo	
2011	SIU	Lee Jae-wi	
2012	Helpless	Dong-woo	
2012	Mr. XXX-Kisser	loan shark	
2012	Deranged	Detective Park	
2012	The Spies	suspicious man	
2012	26 Years	Police Officer Park	
2013	How to Use Guys with Secret Tips	assistant director Jo Seung-hwan	
2013	The Suspect	Reporter Joo	
2013	Commitment	North Korean agent	
2014	The Fatal Encounter	Choi Se-bok	
2014	A Girl at My Door	Jun-ho, Young-nam's senior colleague	
2014	No Tears for the Dead	Team Leader Park	
2014	Ode to My Father	Yoon Do-Joo (Deok-soo's son)	
2015	The Shameless	Min Young-ki	
2015	Veteran	police officer in charge of case	
2015	The Beauty Inside	Woo-jin	
2015	The Exclusive: Beat the Devil's Tattoo	Reporter Choi	
2016	The Truth Beneath	General Secretary	
2017	The King	Reporter Baek	
2017	Yongsoon	music teacher	
2017	The Battleship Island	Song Jong-goo	
2017	Memoir of a Murderer	prosecutor	cameo
2018	Psychokinesis	CEO Min	
2018	Mothers	Kyung-taek	
2018	Unstoppable	Gomsajang	
2019	Money	Yoon Min-joon	
2019	Jo Pil-ho: The Dawning Rage	Internal Affairs Officer Kim Min-jae	
2019	Birthday	Immigration Service Officer 1	cameo
2019	Start-Up	Kwak Sung-Moo	
2020	Peninsula	Sergeant Hwang	
2021	The Asian Angel	Jung-woo	
2022	The Contorted House	Hyeon-min	
2022	Delusion	Seok-ho	
2022	Hansan: Rising Dragon	Lee Eon-ryang	
2023	The Devil's Deal	Jang-ho	
2023	The Roundup: No Way Out	Kim Man-jae	
2023	Cobweb	Chief Kim	
2024	The Roundup: Punishment	Kim Man-jae	
2024	The Firefighters	Shin Yong-tae	

=== Television series ===
Year	Title	Role
2012	Arang and the Magistrate	Geo-deol
2014	Three Days	Hwang Yoon-jae
2014	Big Man	Prosecutor Yong (cameo)
2014	Reset	Detective Park
2015	Spy	Song Joong-hyeok
2015	The Village: Achiara's Secret	Inspector Han
2016	Uncontrollably Fond	actor (ep.1)
2017	Queen of Mystery	Lee Dong-ki
2017–2018	Bad Guys: Vile City	Detective Hwang Min-gab
2018	Feel Good to Die	Park Yoo-deok
2019	The Fiery Priest	Lee Joong-kwon
2019	My Fellow Citizens!	Kim Nam-hwa
2020	The Cursed	Lee Hwan
2024	Nothing Uncovered	Joo Young-seok

=== Web series ===
Year	Title	Role	Notes/Ref.
2022–2023	Shadow Detective	Detective Han	Season 1–2
2022–2023	Big Bet	Ahn Chi-young	Part 1–2
2024	Uncle Samsik	Yoo Yeon-cheol	

=== TV Movies ===
Year	Title	Role	Network
2014	Drama Special: The Final Puzzle	Tae-sik	KBS2

== Awards and nominations ==
Awards and nominations
Award ceremony	Year	Category	Nominee / Work	Result	Ref.
Golden Cinematography Awards	2024	Best New Actor	The Roundup: Punishment	Won	
