= Ma Dong-seok =

South Korean and American actor (born 1971)

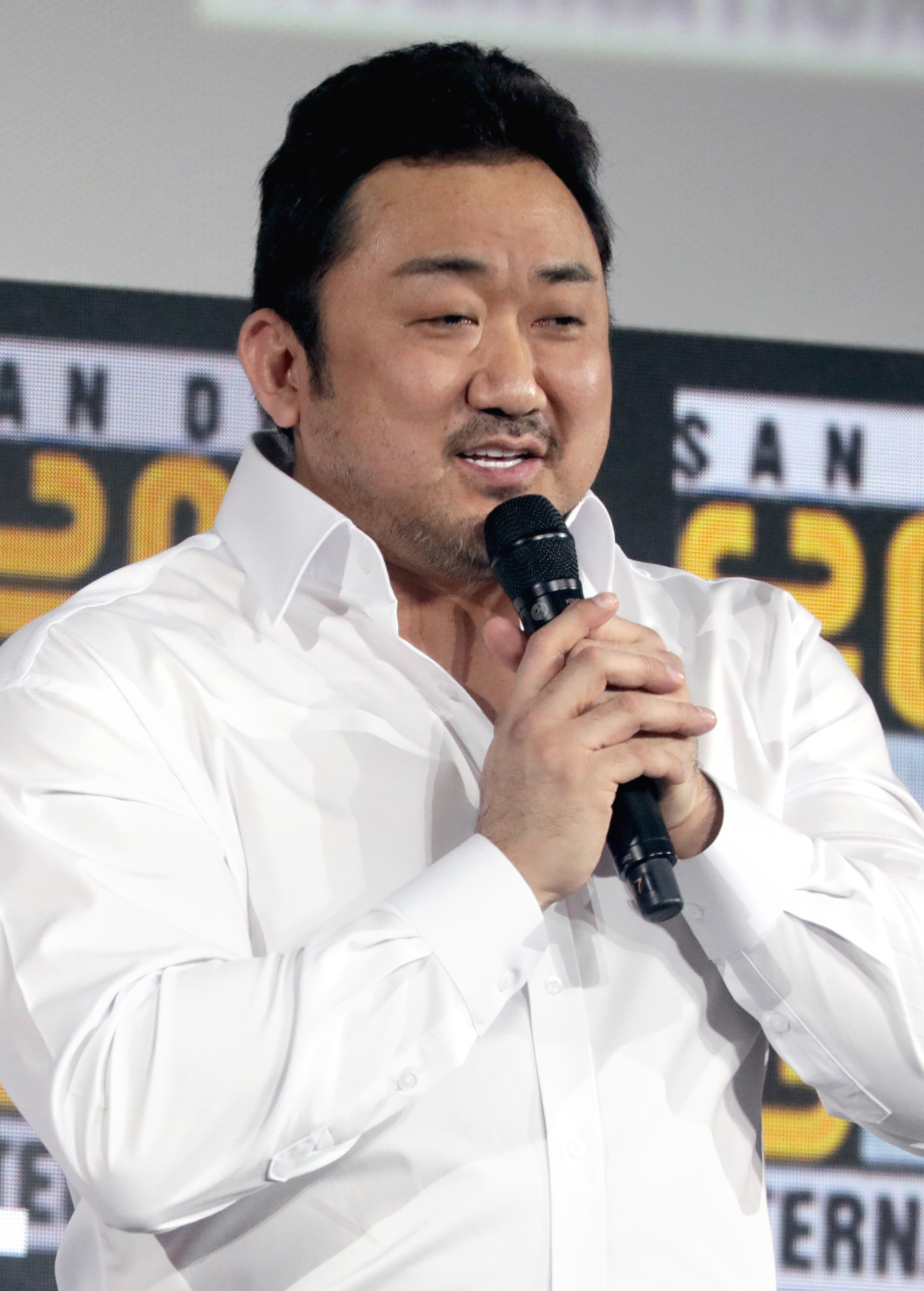
- Ma at the 2019 San Diego Comic-Con
- Born: Lee Dong-seok; March 1, 1971 (age 55); Seoul, South Korea
- Other name: Don Lee
- Citizenship: United States
- Education: Columbus State Community College
- Occupations: Actor; film producer
- Years active: 2003–present
- Agent: Big Punch Entertainment
- Spouse: Ye Jung-hwa (m. 2021)
- Sports career
- Height: 178 cm (5 ft 10 in)
- Weight: 120 kg (260 lb)
- Sport: Arm wrestling

Korean name
- Hangul: 이동석
- RR: I Dongseok
- MR: I Tongsŏk

Stage name
- Hangul: 마동석
- RR: Ma Dongseok
- MR: Ma Tongsŏk

Lee Dong-seok (Korean: 이동석; born March 1, 1971), better known by the stage names Ma Dong-seok (마동석) and Don Lee, is a South Korean and American actor and film producer based in South Korea. He gained early recognition for his supporting roles in Nameless Gangster: Rules of the Time (2012) and The Neighbor (2012).

Ma rose to prominence with his breakout performance in Train to Busan (2016), where he played a tough yet compassionate survivor, earning widespread acclaim. He cemented his status as a leading action star with The Outlaws (2017), in which he portrayed the relentless detective Ma Seok-do, a role he reprised in the highly successful The Roundup film series. His subsequent leading roles include Along with the Gods: The Last 49 Days (2018), The Gangster, the Cop, the Devil (2019), The Bad Guys: Reign of Chaos (2019), Start-Up (2019), and Ashfall (2019).

In 2021, Ma made his Hollywood debut in the Marvel Cinematic Universe film Eternals, which further expanded his global recognition. He remains one of South Korea's most bankable stars and was named Gallup Korea's Film Actor of the Year in 2018, 2023, and 2024.

== Early life ==
Ma was born in South Korea. He had South Korean citizenship until 1989 (when he was aged 18), after which he forfeited his South Korean citizenship and became an American citizen. He returned to South Korea at age 30 and began acting.

== Career ==
Ma rose to fame for supporting roles in the films The Neighbor, Nameless Gangster: Rules of the Time, and The Unjust. He played leading roles in Norigae, Murderer, and One on One.

Ma's role in the zombie film Train to Busan propelled him to international popularity. His subsequent leading roles in films include Derailed, The Bros, The Outlaws, Unstoppable, Champion, The Gangster, the Cop, the Devil, The Bad Guys: Reign of Chaos, and The Roundup, along with supporting roles in Along with the Gods: The Last 49 Days and Ashfall, have met with critical and commercial successes led him to Most Bankable Star of Korean Cinema. Although known for his 'tough guy' persona roles, Ma is often celebrated and criticized for playing similar roles in his movies. In 2019, he joined the cast of the MCU film Eternals as Gilgamesh which marked his Hollywood debut. On television, Ma is known for his roles in the hit OCN series Bad Guys and Squad 38.

In 2022, Ma signed a contract with LDH Japan, another large Japanese agency. His 2022 release action crime thriller The Roundup, sequel to his 2017 film The Outlaws not only opened to unanimous positive reviews but also became the highest-grossing film of 2022 by surpassing 12 million admissions for the first time since 2019 and all time 3rd highest grosser in South Korea. In 2024, dystopian film Badland Hunters in which Ma is playing role of wasteland hunter was released on January 26 on Netflix.

In 2025, Ma was revealed as the lead in Toshihiro Nagoshi's crime video game Gang of Dragon. However, in March 2026, it was reported that NetEase would stop funding the game's development. In October 2026, developer Nagoshi Studio was closed.

Ma is set to appear in Hideo Kojima's upcoming action video game Physint.

== Other activities ==
Under his Westernized name, Don Lee, and before he turned to acting, Ma was the personal trainer of mixed martial artists Mark Coleman and Kevin Randleman.

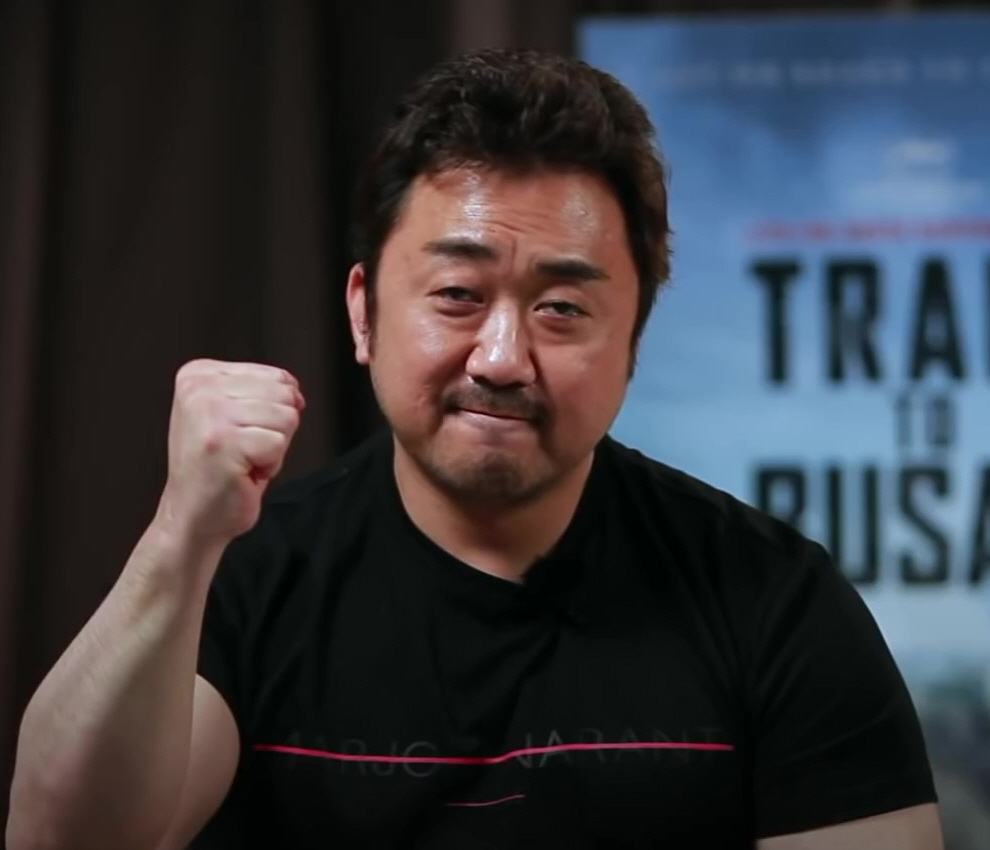
Ma in 2016

With his production company Team Gorilla, Ma is currently involved in planning and writing screenplays. He worked on the screenplay for the film Deep Trap, in which he starred. He is also the co-creator of the OCN Dramatic Cinema series Team Bulldog: Off-Duty Investigation.

=== Armwrestling ===
Ma has been an amateur armwrestler since 2008, and he became the president of Korea Armwrestling Federation in 2018.

== Personal life ==
In 2016, Ma was reportedly dating sports reporter and media personality Ye Jung-hwa. On October 20, 2022, Ma's agency stated that he and Ye had registered their marriage the previous year. The wedding ceremony would be held at a later date, due to the COVID-19 pandemic and busy schedules.

== Accolades ==
=== Awards and nominations ===
Year	Award	Category	Nominated work	Result	Ref.
2012	33rd Blue Dragon Film Awards	Best Supporting Actor	The Neighbor	Nominated	
2013	49th Baeksang Arts Awards	Best Supporting Actor	The Neighbor	Won	
2013	22nd Buil Film Awards	Best Supporting Actor	The Neighbor	Nominated	
2013	17th Puchon International Fantastic Film Festival	It Award	—N/a	Won	
2016	5th APAN Star Awards	Best Supporting Actor	Squad 38	Nominated	
2016	25th Buil Film Awards	Best Supporting Actor	Familyhood	Nominated	
2016	37th Blue Dragon Film Awards	Best Supporting Actor	Train to Busan	Nominated	
2017	8th KOFRA Film Awards	Best Supporting Actor	Train to Busan	Won	
2017	11th Asian Film Awards	Best Supporting Actor	Train to Busan	Nominated	
2017	53rd Baeksang Arts Awards	Best Supporting Actor	Train to Busan	Nominated	
2017	22nd Chunsa Film Art Awards	Best Supporting Actor	Train to Busan	Nominated	
2018	Golden Egg Awards	Best Actor	The Outlaws	Won	
2018	54th Baeksang Arts Awards	Best Actor (Film)	The Outlaws	Nominated	
2018	23rd Chunsa Film Art Awards	Best Actor	The Outlaws	Nominated	
2018	2nd Korea China International Film Festival	Best Actor	The Outlaws	Won	
2022	Beautiful Artist Awards (Shin Young-kyun Arts and Culture Foundation)	Film Artist Award	The Roundup	Won	
2022	9th Korean Film Producers Association Awards	Best Actor	The Roundup	Won	
2022	2022 Kinolights Awards	Actor of the Year (Domestic)	The Roundup	5th	
2023	Visionary Awards (Note: Visionary Awards, which started in 2020, selects and awards people who lead roles in the Korean entertainment industry. It highlights the meaning and achievements of a person whose chosen trend keywords penetrated the entertainment industry, including broadcasting, movies, music, and performances, and presents the next vision of the cultural sector with outstanding achievements and influence.)	2023 Visionary	—N/a	Won	
2023	59th Baeksang Arts Awards	Best Actor – Film	The Roundup	Nominated	

=== Listicles ===
Name of publisher, year listed, name of listicle, and placement
Publisher	Year	Listicle	Placement	Ref.
Cine21	2021	Actors that will lead Korean Video Content Industry in 2022	6th (Note: mentioned together with Wi Ha-joon, Kim Soo-hyun, Jo Jung-suk, Park Jeong-min, Kim Seon-ho, Song Kang-ho, Ahn Bo-hyun, Ryu Jun-yeol, Choi Woo-shik)	
Forbes	2025	Korea Power Celebrity	27th	
Gallup Korea	2017	Film Actor of the Year	2nd	
Gallup Korea	2018	Film Actor of the Year	1st	
Gallup Korea	2019	Film Actor of the Year	2nd	
Gallup Korea	2020	Film Actor of the Year	3rd	
Gallup Korea	2021	Film Actor of the Year	3rd	
Gallup Korea	2022	Film Actor of the Year	2nd	
Gallup Korea	2023	Film Actor of the Year	1st	
