= Jang Kyung-ik =

South Korean filmmaker (born 1972)

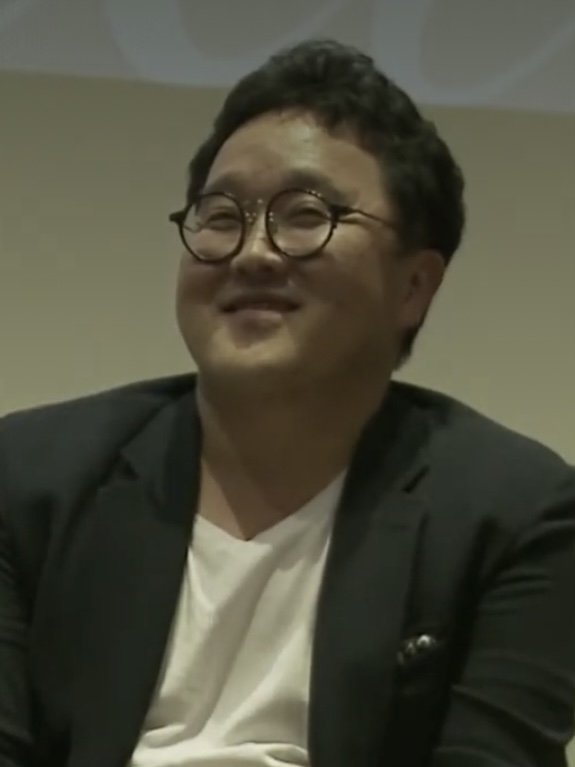
- Jang Kyung-ik (2017)
- Born: January 12, 1972 (age 54); South Korea
- Education: Kyungpook National University
- Occupation: Filmmaker
- Years active: 2002·present
- Employers: Shinsegi Telecommunications (2000 prior); Megabox (2002–2008); NEW (2008–2024); Studio Dragon (2024–present)

Korean name
- Hangul: 장경익
- RR: Jang Gyeongik
- MR: Chang Kyŏngik

Jang Kyung-ik (Korean: 장경익, born January 12, 1972) is a South Korean filmmaker, producer and entertainment executive. He established himself as a prominent producer in South Korea through his work on blockbuster films such as Miracle in Cell No. 7 and Train to Busan, which attracted over 10 million viewers. He is also known for producing series Descendants of the Sun, as well as Moving and Doctor Cha, for which he received the Best Series Producer award from Cine21.

Jang co-founded of Next Entertainment World (NEW) and served as the head of its film division, as well as the CEO of its subsidiary, Studio&NEW. After leaving NEW, in July 2024, CJ ENM appointed Jang as CEO of its subsidiary, Studio Dragon.

== Early life ==
Jang Kyung-ik was born on January 12, 1972. During his school years, he did not have specific aspirations for the future; however, he developed a strong interest in cinema. He was particularly drawn to films such as The Sound of Music and Graduation, which he watched multiple times. While he did not have a particular favorite director, he admired actors like Tom Hanks, Daniel Day-Lewis, and Meg Ryan.

His life film is Chungking Express, which provided solace during his most turbulent periods. In his twenties, he struggled with self-image, finding his path in life, and navigating romantic relationships. To cope, he took breaks from school and later enlisted in the military after receiving his mandatory service warrant. He also took a leave of absence to focus on exam preparation and departed Korea for language training just one semester before graduation.

== Career ==
=== Early career at Megabox ===
Jang graduated with a degree in economics and began his career as an office worker in the mobile telecommunications industry. Dissatisfied with the routine corporate environment at Shinsegi Telecommunications, he made the bold decision to leave and start his own business. After trying his hand at a web animation venture for two years, Jang realized he was seeking something more fulfilling. In early 2002, he secured a position at Megabox, where his interviewer saw his talent as a movie theater programmer. With dedication and perseverance, Jang rapidly progressed in his role, eventually leading the programming team.

As the head of Megabox's programming team, Jang Kyung-ik was responsible for tasks such as theater placement and movie purchasing. His team determined which movies will be shown at Megabox's 19 theater sites nationwide. Despite not hiring film majors, the team consists of members with movie theater experience who judge movie success based on the preferences of the general audience. They focused on capturing audience emotions by carefully examining movie titles, posters, trailers, and considering press reactions, online community responses, and preview screenings. The team acknowledged the significant influence of word-of-mouth in the film industry.

During his seven years at Megabox, Jang had the opportunity to work closely with Kim Woo-taek. In his role as team leader during his second to third year, Jang Kyung-ik organized Japanese and European film festivals and launched the 'Movie On Style' brand. He actively engaged in marketing and distributing high-art films, which he found immensely enjoyable. As Jang approached his mid-30s, his love for movies grew stronger, solidifying his lifelong aspiration of a career in the film industry. When considering the idea of starting a film company, Kim Woo-taek proposed that they embark on the venture together.

=== Career at Next Entertainment World (NEW) ===
In 2008, Jang Kyung-ik joined Kim Woo-taek as co-founder in Kim newly established Next Entertainment World (NEW) alongside Kim Hyeong-cheol, Kim Jae-min, and Park Jun-kyung. Jang led the film division, while his co-founders managed investment, distribution, and marketing respectively. The name "NEW" was chosen to represent innovation and a departure from outdated industry concepts. Unlike competitors, NEW operates without owning multiplex cinema chains. This unique position focuses the company's strategy entirely on investment and distribution. To make the company more agile, Jang and Kim established a "club culture" defined by flat hierarchies and minimal formal meetings. This system prioritizes individual responsibility and open communication, allowing employees to challenge ideas regardless of rank. This collegiate environment emphasizes thorough consensus over rapid decision-making.

In 2010, NEW distributed nine mid-range and low-budget films, including Poongsan and Blind. Of these releases, six exceeded their break-even points, resulting in a 66.7% success rate. This performance was notably high compared to the broader industry, as the Korean Film Council estimated that only 24.6% of Korean films released that year were profitable.

In 2012, NEW saw significant success with the distribution of Unbowed, All About My Wife, The Grand Heist, and Pieta, defying market predictions. Unbowed, director Chung Ji-young's return after a 13-year hiatus, was produced and distributed by Aura Pictures on a modest budget of ₩1.5 billion. Following a 13-minute standing ovation at the 2011 Busan International Film Festival, the film was released on January 18, 2012, during the Lunar New Year holiday. Despite initially opening on only 245 screens, the second lowest among its competitors, strong word of mouth led to a peak of 456 screens by January 24. By the end of the first quarter of 2012, the Korean Film Council (KOFIC) ranked Unbowed as the third most-watched film in South Korea, totaling 3.4 million viewers.

Released following the success of Architecture 101, All About My Wife was initially not expected to be a major hit. However, during its opening weekend from May 18 to 20, the film surpassed expectations by selling 594,195 tickets. It secured the top position at the local box office, outperforming Hollywood blockbusters such as The Avengers and Men in Black 3. Within 19 days of its release, The Grand Heist reached 4 million viewers, becoming the seventh Korean film of 2012 to achieve this milestone. The film eventually recorded over 4.9 million total admissions. During its first week, it ranked second at the box office with a gross of ₩9,615,802,659. Over a five week theatrical run, it amassed a domestic total of ₩33,693,067,319, establishing itself as a major summer hit alongside titles such as The Dark Knight Rises and The Thieves.

Director Kim Ki-duk's Pietà also emerged as a significant success for the company. After premiering at the 69th Venice International Film Festival on September 4, 2012, it won the Golden Lion. This victory marked the first time a Korean film received the top prize at any of the three major international film festivals: Venice, Cannes, or Berlin. Following its theatrical release in South Korea on September 6, 2012, the film's distribution rights were sold to 20 countries, including Italy, Germany, and Russia. The North American theatrical release was handled by the independent distributor Drafthouse Films.

Building on its momentum from 2012, NEW continued to dominate the market in 2013 with the release of the hit film Miracle in Cell No. 7. Within its first two weeks, the production attracted 4.6 million admissions and earned over US$30 million. Despite competition from The Berlin File, the film's audience grew by 15% in its third week, maintaining a high seat-occupancy rate of 75.8%. On its 32nd day of release, Miracle in Cell No. 7 became the eighth film in Korean cinema history to surpass 10 million ticket sales. Given its modest budget and break-even point of only 1.7 million admissions, it became the most profitable film to ever reach the 10 million mark at that time. By March 15, 2013, the film had reached 12.32 million admissions, securing its position as the seventh highest grossing Korean film of all time. Driven by the success of Miracle in Cell No. 7, Hide and Seek (5.6 million viewers), and New World (4.68 million viewers), NEW outperformed major competitors such as CJ E&M, Showbox, and Lotte to claim the top spot in domestic audience share for the year.

In 2013, NEW secured the distribution rights for The Attorney after Jang Kyung-ik and CEO Kim Woo-taek personally intervened to outbid competitors CJ and Showbox. The film, which marked the directorial debut of Yang Woo-suk, was inspired by the real-life 1981 Burim case during the Chun Doo-hwan regime. Starring Song Kang-ho as a tax lawyer undergoing a moral transformation through five intense trials, the project was produced by withUs Film. Produced for ₩7.5 billion, the film became a massive commercial success, selling over 11 million tickets and grossing ₩82.9 billion.

Following the peak of 2013, NEW entered a period of recession in 2014. High-profile releases such as Sea Fog and the action film Big Match failed to meet commercial expectations. Recognizing this as a downturn, Jang Kyung-ik reorganized the company's internal structure to prepare for future growth.

By 2016, the company experienced its most significant period of success since its inception. In the first half of the year, NEW's drama division achieved a massive hit with Descendants of the Sun, which surpassed 38% in viewership ratings. The film division saw equal success with the zombie thriller Train to Busan. Directed by Yeon Sang-ho and written by Park Joo-suk, Train to Busan premiered at the 2016 Cannes Film Festival before its domestic release. The film, starring Gong Yoo, Ma Dong-seok, and Jung Yu-mi, follows passengers on a KTX train from Seoul to Busan struggling to survive a sudden zombie apocalypse. It was the first Korean production of 2016 to surpass 10 million admissions. Against a budget of $8.5 million, it achieved a cumulative worldwide gross of $98.5 million, including $80.5 million in South Korea and over $15 million in international territories.

=== Studio&NEW ===
In September 2016, Jang Kyung-ik played a central role in establishing Studio&NEW as a subsidiary of Next Entertainment World (NEW). The company was founded to leverage the production capabilities demonstrated by the success of Descendants of the Sun and to diversify the parent company's reach into both the film and television sectors. Jang was officially appointed CEO of Studio&NEW at the end of 2016. Following this, on June 28, 2017, NEW Chairman Kim Woo-taek appointed Park Jun-kyung to succeed Jang as the head of the parent company's Film Division, allowing Jang to focus on the subsidiary's operations. Later that year, Jang unveiled Studio&NEW's inaugural drama lineup and announced a memorandum of understanding (MOU) with the broadcaster JTBC.

Under Jang's oversight, production for the historical epic The Great Battle took place from August 2017 to January 2018. Due to a scarcity of historical records regarding the battle and the figure Yang Manchun, director Kim Kwang-sik consulted approximately 100 Japanese and Chinese publications. Due to a lack of sources, the director just referenced sources he had and filled the gaps with his own imagination. The film premiered in South Korea on September 19, 2018, with an age 12-rating. It opened during one of the most competitive weeks at the 2018 Korean box office, debuting alongside Fengshui, The Negotiation, and The Nun. Despite a high net production cost of 15 billion won, the film reached its break-even point, recording 4.52 million viewers by September 30. Following its domestic success, the film secured distribution deals in over 32 countries

Under Jang's direction, Studio&NEW secured significant capital to fuel its expansion. In January 2018, the studio attracted 34.3 billion won in Series A funding from KT Skylife and other investors. In early September 2019, Studio&NEW attracted Series B investment worth 22 billion won through common stock issuance. The cumulative investment amount is 56.3 billion won. By early 2019, Jang's leadership role within the parent company was reinstated when NEW Chairman Kim Woo-taek appointed him to lead the Film Division once again. Starting February 1, 2019, Jang concurrently served as the head of NEW's film division and the CEO of Studio&NEW.

Jang continued to drive high-level partnerships, including a November 2020 equity investment contract with Geumwol, a production house owned by director Park Hoon-jung. In April 2021, Jang announced a long-term content partnership with Disney, establishing a pipeline for Studio&NEW content to be featured globally on Disney+. In August 2023, the studio shifted its strategic focus exclusively to content planning and production. As part of this transition, Jang oversaw the closure of the actor management division, providing support to displaced employees and talent during their move to new agencies.

Jang transitioned from his executive duties in 2024, serving as the Content Strategy CEO of Studio&NEW from January to April. As of May 2024, he transitioned into an advisory role for the company.

=== Studio Dragon ===
In July 2024, CJ ENM has appointed Jang as CEO of its subsidiary Studio Dragon.

== Filmography ==
=== Film ===
Feature film credit produced by NEW
Year	Title		Ref.
Year	English	Original	Ref.
2008	Cyborg She	僕の彼女はサイボーグ	
2009	A Season of Good Rain	호우시절	
2010	Poetry	시	
2010	Death Bell 2: Bloody Camp	고死 두번째 이야기 : 교생실습	
2010	Haunters	초능력자	
2010	Late Blossom	그대를 사랑합니다	
2010	Hello Ghost	헬로우 고스트	
2011	Poongsan	풍산개	
2011	Blind	블라인드	
2011	Marrying the Mafia IV	가문의 영광4 - 가문의 수난	
2011	Unbowed	부러진 화살	
2011	Come Rain, Come Shine	사랑한다, 사랑하지 않는다	
2011	The Cat	고양이: 죽음을보는 두개의눈	
2012	Dangerously Excited	나는 공무원이다	
2012	Miss Conspirator	미쓰 GO	
2012	The Grand Heist	바람과 함께 사라지다	
2012	Pietà	피에타	
2012	Ghost Sweepers	점쟁이들	
2012	Love Fiction	러브 픽션	
2012	All About My Wife	내 아내의 모든 것	
2012	Love 911	반창꼬	
2013	The Attorney	변호인	
2013	Cold Eyes	감시자들	
2013	Miracle in Cell No. 7	7번방의 선물	
2013	New World	신세계	
2013	The Fake	사이비	
2013	Hide and Seek	숨바꼭질	
2014	Sea Fog	해무	
2014	For the Emperor	황제를 위하여	
2014	Fashion King	패션왕	
2014	Man in Love	남자가 사랑할 때	
2015	Twenty	스물	
2015	Chronicle of a Blood Merchant	허삼관	
2015	The Phone	더 폰	
2015	Northern Limit Line	연평해전	
2015	The Beauty Inside	뷰티 인사이드	
2015	You Call It Passion	열정 같은 소리 하고 있네	
2015	The Tiger	대호	
2016	Train to Busan	부산행	
2016	Pandora	판도라	
2017	Because I Love You	사랑하기 때문에	
2017	The Mimic	장산범	
2017	The King	더킹	
2017	Lucid Dream	루시드 드림	
2017	One Line	원라인	
2017	What a Man Wants	바람 바람 바람	
2017	The Villainess	악녀	
2017	Steel Rain	강철비	
2018	Psychokinesis	염력	
2018	Herstory	허스토리	
2018	Believer	독전	
2018	The Great Battle	안시성	
2018	Rampant	창궐	
2019	Homme Fatale	기방도령	
2019	Birthday	생일	
2019	Inseparable Bros	나의 특별한 형제	
2019	Cheer Up, Mr. Lee	힘을 내요, 미스터 리	
2019	Start-Up	시동	
2020	Honest Candidate	정직한 후보	
2020	Peninsula	반도	
2020	Night in Paradise	낙원의 밤	
2020	The Call	콜	
2021	Hostage: Missing Celebrity	인질	
2021	Perhaps Love	장르만 로맨스	
2022	Special Delivery	특송	
2022	The Witch: Part 2. The Other One	마녀 2: the other one	
2022	Honest Candidate 2	정직한 후보 2	
2022	The Night Owl	올빼미	
2023	Soulmate	소울메이트	
2023	Long D	롱디	
2023	The Childe	귀공자	
2023	Smugglers	밀수	
2023	Marrying the Mafia: Returns	가문의 영광:리턴즈	

=== Television series ===
Television drama credits
Year	Title		Network	Director	Production house	Ref.
Year	English	Korean	Network	Director	Production house	Ref.
2016	Descendants of the Sun	태양의 후예	KBS2	Lee Eung-bok; Baek Sang-hoon	KBS; Next Entertainment World; Barunson Inc.; Descendants of the Sun SPC	
2018	Ms. Hammurabi	미스 함무라비	JTBC	Kwak Jung-hwan	Studio&NEW	
2018	The Beauty Inside	뷰티 인사이드	JTBC	Song Hyun-wook	Studio&NEW; Yong Film	
2019	Chief of Staff	보좌관	JTBC	Kwak Jung-hwan	Studio&NEW	
2020	Oh My Baby	오 마이 베이비	tvN	Nam Ki-hoon	Studio&NEW; Studio Dragon	
2020	Graceful Friends	우아한 친구들	JTBC	Song Hyun-wook	Studio&NEW; SLL; JCN	
2020–2021	Delayed Justice	날아라 개천용	SBS TV	Kwak Jung-hwan	Studio&NEW	
2021	Doom at Your Service	어느 날 우리 집 현관으로 멸망이 들어왔다	tvN	Kwon Young-il	Studio&NEW; Studio Dragon	
2021	The Devil Judge	악마판사	tvN	Choi Jung-kyu	Studio&NEW; Studio Dragon	
2023	Doctor Cha	닥터 차정숙	JTBC	Kim Dae-jin; Kim Jung-wook	Studio&NEW; SLL; JCN	
2023–2024	Tell Me That You Love Me	사랑한다고 말해줘	ENA	Kim Yoon-jin	Studio&NEW; Artist Studio	

=== Web series ===
Web series
Year	Title		OTT	Director	Production house	Credited as		Ref.
Year	English	Korean	OTT	Director	Production house	Planner	Investor	Ref.
2022	Rookie Cops	너와 나의 경찰수업	Disney+	Kim Byung-soo	Studio&NEW; The Walt Disney Company (Korea)	No	Yes	
2023	Moving	무빙	Disney+	Park In-je	Studio&NEW; Mr. Romance; The Walt Disney Company (Korea)	Yes	Yes	

== Accolades ==
=== Award and nomination ===
Award	Year	Category	Nominee(s) / work(s)	Result	Ref.
APAN Star Awards	2023	Drama of the Year	Moving	Nominated	
Asia Contents Awards & Global OTT Awards	2023	Best Creative	Moving	Won	
Asia Contents Awards & Global OTT Awards	2023	Best Visual Effects	Moving	Won	
Cine21 Film Awards	2023	Series Producer of the Year	Doctor Cha; Moving	Won	
Critics' Choice Awards	2024	Best Foreign Language Series	Moving	Nominated	
Grand Bell Awards	2023	Best Series	Moving	Won	

=== State honors ===
Name of country, year given, and name of honor
Country	Award Ceremony	Year	Honor	Ref.
South Korea	Korean Content Awards (Note: Honors are given at the Korean Content Awards (대한민국 콘텐츠 대상) arranged by the Korea Creative Content Agency and hosted by the Ministry of Culture, Sports and Tourism. The 2022 Korea Content Awards Ceremony, which started in 2009 and celebrated its 14th this year, aims to inspire pride in the content industry and develop the Korean cultural content industry by discovering and awarding contributors and excellent content that have contributed to the development of the content industry in 2022. It is a place to promote. The winners (works) of honor, which are recommended through the website of the Korea Creative Content Agency (www.kocca.kr) and announced through careful examination by experts and three-step verification, play a leading role in shining the Korean content industry in the world.)	2024	Order of Cultural Merit for Contribution to the development of the broadcasting and video industry	
