= Train to Busan (film series) =

South Korean zombie film series

- Official franchise logo
- Based on: Characters by Park Joo-suk
- Starring: Various actors (See details)
- Distributed by: Next Entertainment World
- Country: South Korea
- Language: Korean
- Budget: $25,075,000 (Total of 3 films)
- Box office: $111,330,565 (Total of 3 films)

Train to Busan is a South Korean zombie film series produced by Next Entertainment World. The installments include a theatrical film, an animated prequel that was released in theaters in the international market, and a standalone sequel that had a limited theatrical release. Based on an original story by Park Joo-suk, the premise centers around a zombie epidemic outbreak that originates in South Korea. Each respective installment details the struggles of the primary characters to withstand the advances of the undead, and survive the events to make their escape.

The original film, Train to Busan, was met with critical and box office success. The prequel, Seoul Station was also met with positive critical reception, with praise directed at its expansion to the story; while it also attained monetary gains for the studios. However, the sequel, Peninsula, received mixed reviews from critics with the film being perceived as inferior to its predecessors. Despite its overall reception, and being released during the COVID-19 coronavirus pandemic impact on the film industry, it was a financial success.

An American remake and a sequel to Peninsula is in development.

== Films ==
Title	Korean title	World-wide release date	Director	Screenwriter(s)	Producer(s)
Train to Busan	부산행	May 13, 2016	Yeon Sang-ho	Park Joo-suk	Lee Dong-ha
Seoul Station	서울역	August 18, 2016	Yeon Sang-ho		Lee Dong-ha, Youngjoo Suh and Yeon Sang-ho
Peninsula	반도	July 5, 2020	Yeon Sang-ho	Park Joo-Suk & Yeon Sang-ho	Lee Dong-ha
The Last Train to New York	TBA	TBA	Timo Tjahjanto	Gary Dauberman	James Wan, Gary Dauberman, Michael Clear, Nicolas Atlan and Terry Kalagian
Untitled Peninsula sequel	TBA	TBA	TBA	Yeon Sang-ho	TBA

=== Train to Busan (2016) ===
A man named Seok-woo, his estranged daughter Su-an, and other passengers become trapped on a speeding train in South Korea during a zombie outbreak. As the passengers become overtaken by the undead passengers, and gradually become infected, the number of defenders dwindle as the safety of available space within the railroad vehicle dwindles. With each station at each stop proving to also be overtaken, the train continues along as its passengers hope to escape before they are all infected. Despite insurmountable odds, the father-daughter duo fight to survive by mending their relationship and creating alliances with the remaining passengers, all while overcoming the rising forces of the army of undead plaguing the limited train space.

=== Seoul Station (2016) ===
Prior to the events of the zombie outbreak in Busan, Hye-sun and her boyfriend Ki-woong arrive at a train station in Seoul, South Korea. Hye-sun, who recently escaped her life of slavery at a brothel, now lives with Ki-woong in a troubled relationship. As they face financial troubles, Ki-woong approaches Hye-sun with plans to procuring her for services on an adult online website. As their argument at the station begins, the pair separate just as a bloodied homeless man stumbles into the train station area and collapses. The man's younger brother frantically asks onlookers for help, though they are repulsed by the lack of cleanliness and social status of the men; the ailing man is left alone to die. This quickly changes however, when the man reanimates and attacks the crowd in a ravenous frenzy. As the infection begins to spread to those who are bitten, Hye-sun witnesses the ongoing bloodbath, while Ki-woong's search is intensified when her father Suk-gyu arrives looking for her. As the trio reunites, they fight for survival and race to stay ahead of the pandemonious epidemic. As their window for escape narrows, militant officials assemble to contain what the interpret as an insurrection. Despite their differences, the family struggles to board a train and avoid the ongoing attacks from the undead.

=== Peninsula (2020) ===
As a zombie epidemic quickly spreads over South Korea and the country is defeated in a day, Korean Marine Jung-seok races to get his family to a ship to escape the outbreak. The family passes a couple with a young daughter that pleads for assistance, though they leave them behind in their frantic escape. The passengers aboard the ship begin to succumb to similar ailments including Jung-seok's nephew. As his sister refuses to leave her child, Jung-seok is left to lock down the quarters to save the rest of the ship. As military officials arrive, his brother-in-law named Chul-min watches on mournfully watching his wife and son die. He resentfully states that Jung-seok should have done more to save his family. The forces of the world quarantine South Korea and lockdown its borders.

Four years later, the guilt-ridden pair are approached by a criminal mob group in Hong Kong, China to infiltrate South Korea to retrieve a truck filled with US$20 million. As the group creates a plan to reach their goal, Jung-seok and Chul-min negotiate half of the money as their earnings. Upon arrival, the team is ambushed and overtaken by a rogue militia named Unit 631, and an attracted army of undead. As Unit 631 escapes with the truck of money, Jung-seok and Chul-min are separated in the chaotic events. Jung-seok is rescued by two young girls, Joon and Yu-jin, who drive him back to their sanctuary community. As he meets with their mother and grandfather, Min-jung and Elder Kim, respectively, he quickly learns that she was the woman who begged him for help and he chose to leave behind four years ago. The group devise a plan to retrieve the money-filled truck from the criminal military that took it, by infiltrating their arena of underground zombie survival games; after which they will escape the country. In the course of events Jung-seok learns that Chul-min is alive and held therein, and sets out to rescue his estranged brother-in-law.

As the events escalate, he fights with determination to keep the members of his team alive, and seeks to redeem his mistake in leaving them behind years before. As they fight for survival against the advances of the undead, they race against the clock when an arriving helicopter will provide their escape.

=== Future ===
==== The Last Train to New York (TBA) ====
In September 2018, an English language adaptation of Train to Busan was announced to be in development. Following a competitive bidding war for the distribution rights to the project, New Line Cinema was announced to serve the distributing company.

In February 2021, it was announced that the film will be directed by Timo Tjahjanto, with a script written by Gary Dauberman, the premise be similar to that of the original film. The project will be a joint-venture production between New Line Cinema, Atomic Monster, Gaumont, and Coin Operated Productions. James Wan, Michael Clear, Nicolas Atlan, Terry Kalagian, and Dauberman will serve as producers. In November 2021, the title was officially revealed to be The Last Train to New York. In December of the same year, Yeon Sang-ho stated that the film would be a reimagining separate story that was inspired by the original, as opposed to a direct remake.

The Last Train to New York was originally scheduled to be released theatrically on April 21, 2023; though this was changed to an as-of-yet unspecified date. In June 2025, James Wan stated that the movie is still in development, while announcing that rather than being a remake, The Last Train to New York the plot takes place within the same fictional continuity as the previous installments. As of March 2026, the film's status remains unknown.

==== Untitled Peninsula sequel (TBA) ====
In August 2020, Yeon Sang-ho confirmed plans to continue the film series with various films set within the same Train to Busan universe, while announcing development on another film had begun. Sang-ho stated that though he may not direct the film, he is involved with the project. In November 2021, the filmmaker stated that after considering expanding the film series into a franchise with a potential television series, film industry conditions on Korea made him decide on making another film. Sang-ho elaborated that work on the third film is ongoing while stating that the plot will be restricted to a confined space more similar to the first film, as opposed to the action-packed sequences of the second movie.

== Principal cast and characters ==
List indicators

This section includes characters who will appear or have appeared in the franchise in main roles.

- An empty grey cell indicates the character was not in the film, or that the character's official presence has not yet been confirmed.
- ^{C} indicates a cameo role.
- ^{V} indicates a voice-only role.

Character	Films		
Character	Train to Busan	Seoul Station	Peninsula
Character	2016		2020
Seok-woo	Gong Yoo		
Su-an	Kim Su-an		
Sang-hwa	Ma Dong-seok		
Seong-kyeong	Jung Yu-mi		
Yong-guk	Choi Woo-shik		
Jin-hee	Ahn So-hee		
Yon-suk	Kim Eui-sung		
Hye-sun	Shim Eun-kyung^{C}	Shim Eun-kyung^{V}	
Suk-gyu		Ryu Seung-ryong^{V}	
Ki-woong		Lee Joon^{V}	
Han Jung-seok			Gang Dong-won
Min-jung			Lee Jung-hyun
Elder Kim Noh-in			Kwon Hae-hyo
Sgt. Hwang			Kim Min-jae
Capt. Seo			Koo Kyo-hwan
Chul-min			Kim Do-yoon
Joon-yi			Lee Re
Yu-jin			Lee Ye-won
Dong-hwan			Moon Woo-jin

== Additional crew and production details ==
Film	Crew/Detail					
Film	Composer	Cinematographer	Editor(s)	Production companies	Distributing companies	Running time
Train to Busan	Jang Young-gyu	Lee Hyung-deok	Yang Jin-mo	Well Go USA Entertainment, N.E.W.: Next Entertainment World, RedPeter Films	Next Entertainment World, Well Go USA Entertainment	1 hr 58 mins
Seoul Station	Jang Young-gyu	Art director: Ryun Ki-hyun	Yeon Sang-ho & Lee Yeon-jung	N.E.W.: Next Entertainment World, Studio Dadashow, Finecut Studios, Myung Films, FilmRise, Shudder Original Films	Finecut, Shudder	1 hr 32 mins
Peninsula	Lee "Mowg" Sung-hyun	Lee Hyung-deok	Yang Jin-mo	N.E.W., Next Entertainment World, Shudder Original Films, RedPeter Films, Festival de Cannes Official Selection 2020	N.E.W.: Next Entertainment Word, Well Go USA Entertainment	1 hr 56 mins
The Last Train to New York	TBA	TBA	TBA	New Line Cinema, Atomic Monster, Gaumont, Coin Operated Productions	Warner Bros. Pictures	TBA

== Reception ==
=== Box office and financial performance ===
Film	Box office gross			Box office ranking		Budget	Worldwide total net income	Ref.
Film	North America	Other territories	Worldwide	All-time North America	All-time worldwide	Budget	Worldwide total net income	Ref.
Train to Busan	$2,129,768	$93,569,875	$95,699,643	#1	#1	$8,500,000	$87,199,643	
Seoul Station	—N/a	$1,032,650	$1,032,650	—N/a	#1	$575,000	$1,032,650	
Peninsula	$1,231,407	$38,441,865	$39,673,272	—N/a	—N/a	$16,000,000	$23,673,272	
Totals	$3,361,175	$133,044,390	$136,405,565	x̄ #2,481	x̄ #342	$25,075,000	$111,330,565	

=== Critical and public response ===
Film	Rotten Tomatoes	Metacritic
Train to Busan	94% (117 reviews)	72/100 (16 reviews)
Seoul Station	100% (23 reviews)	—N/a
Peninsula	53% (116 reviews)	51/100 (26 reviews)
