= Lee Joo-ahn =

South Korean actor (born 1996)

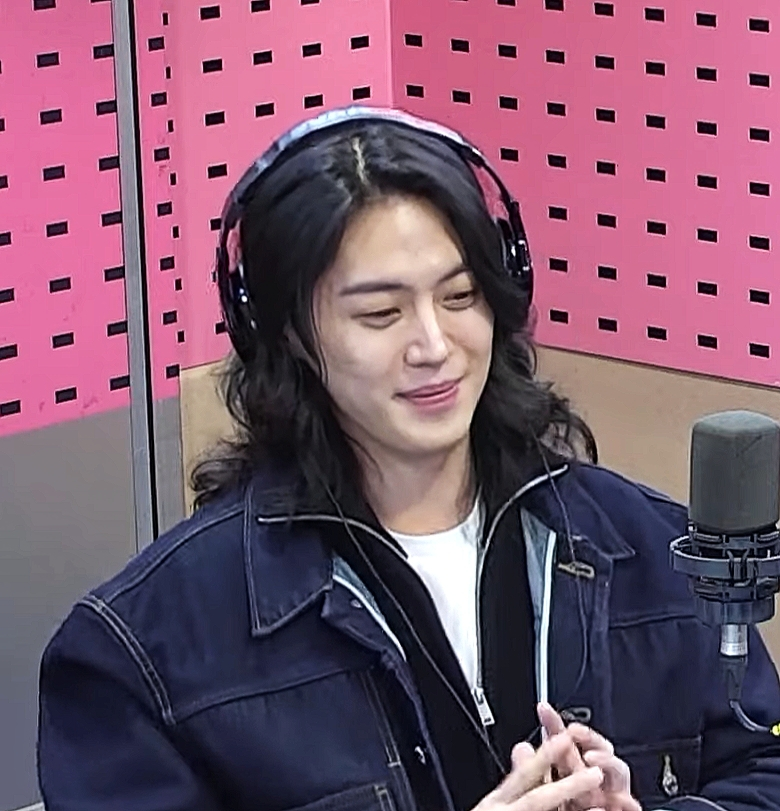
- Lee in 2025
- Born: January 24, 1996 (age 30); Yangsan, South Gyeongsang Province, South Korea
- Education: Dankook University
- Occupation: Actor
- Years active: 2018–present
- Agent: YY Entertainment
- Height: 184 cm (6 ft 0 in)

Korean name
- Hangul: 이주안
- RR: I Juan
- MR: I Chuan

Lee Joo-ahn (Korean: 이주안; born January 24, 1996) is a South Korean actor under YY Entertainment.

== Early life ==
Lee Joo-ahn was born on January 24, 1996. He attended Dankook University, majoring in Acting at the School of Performing Arts and Film.

== Career ==
Lee made his acting debut in JTBC's Sky Castle in 2018. The following year, he appeared in the second seasons of Save Me and Chief of Staff. In 2020, he signed an exclusive contract with Artist Company and appeared on tvN's True Beauty and JTBC's Sweet Munchies. He moved to YY Entertainment in 2023, and made his first reality show appearance on Magic Lamp, a travel program. From 2024 to 2025, he appeared in the historical fantasy dramas Love Song for Illusion and Bon Appétit, Your Majesty, gaining recognition for his portrayal of Gong Gil in the latter. In 2026, he made a special appearance in ENA's Dream to You and was cast as the lead in KBS2's A Love Other Than Yours, co-starring with Seo Kang-joon, Ahn Eun-jin, and Jo Aram.

== Personal life ==
At age 22, he was exempted from mandatory military service after donating 70% of his liver to his mother.

== Filmography ==
=== Television series ===
Key
†	Denotes television productions that have not yet been released

Year	Title	Role	Notes	Ref.
2018	Sky Castle	Lee Dong-min	Acting debut	
2019	Save Me 2			
2019	Chief of Staff	Park Jung-seok	Season 2	
2020	True Beauty	Choi Man-shik		
2020	Sweet Munchies			
2021	Youth of May			
2021–2022	Snowdrop			
2024	Love Song for Illusion	Ha Rang		
2025	Bon Appetit, Your Majesty	Gong Gil		
2026	Dream to You	Geum Seong-mu		
2026	A Love Other Than Yours	Han Tae-seung		

=== Television show ===
Year	Title	Role	Ref.
2023	Magic Lamp		

== Awards and nominations ==
Name of the award ceremony, year presented, award category, nominee(s) of the award, and the result of the nomination
Award ceremony	Year	Category	Nominee(s) / Work(s)	Result	Ref.
33rd Korea Culture and Entertainment	2025	Best Actor Award	—N/a	Won	
