= Seoul Station (film) =

2016 South Korean animated film

- Theatrical release poster
- Directed by: Yeon Sang-ho
- Written by: Yeon Sang-ho
- Based on: Train to Busan by Park Joo-suk
- Produced by: Suh Youngjoo; Lee Dong-ha; Yeon Sang-ho
- Starring: Shim Eun-kyung; Ryu Seung-ryong; Lee Joon
- Edited by: Lee Yeon-jung; Yeon Sang-ho
- Music by: Jang Young-gyu
- Production companies: Finecut; Next Entertainment World; Studio Dadashow
- Distributed by: Next Entertainment World
- Release date: August 18, 2016 (South Korea)
- Running time: 92 minutes
- Country: South Korea
- Language: Korean
- Budget: $575,000
- Box office: $2,021,735

Seoul Station (Korean: 서울역) is a 2016 South Korean adult animated post-apocalyptic zombie horror film written and directed by Yeon Sang-ho. It is the second installment in the Train to Busan film series, and a prequel of its eponymous film. The aeni (South Korean animation) depicts the onset of the zombie epidemic, and revolves around the three main characters; Hye-sun, a young woman and prostitute attempting to survive in the world which sees her as disposable, Suk-gyu, her father who is searching for his runaway daughter with help from her boyfriend, Ki-woong.

Released on 18 August 2016, the film stars Shim Eun-kyung, Ryu Seung-ryong and Lee Joon in the lead roles. The film was shown at the 2016 Brussels International Fantastic Film Festival. The film was awarded the Best Animated Feature Film at the 10th edition of the Asian Pacific Screen Awards in 2016.

== Plot ==
A homeless man walks around the Seoul Station area with a bloody wound on his neck until he reaches Seoul Station and lays down. A fellow squatter sits next to him, notices the blood and tries to get help, but the injured man is no longer alive when he returns. The squatter goes to the transit police to report the man's death; the officers follow him, but the man is gone. The squatter goes to search for the old man and finds him as a zombie, who attacks him.

Hye-sun, who ran away from her former life in a brothel, now lives with her boyfriend, Ki-woong, who wants to pimp Hye-sun out again due to money problems. When Hye-sun refuses, Ki-woong abandons her at Seoul Station, where she is eventually swarmed by homeless people fleeing the infected. Hye-sun escapes with a few survivors into a police station, where they shelter in a jail cell with a policeman. When the policeman draws his gun on the survivors, Hye-sun drops her phone, leaving them with no communication as a zombie bites the policeman. Meanwhile, Suk-gyu meets Ki-woong through the advertisement prostituting Hye-sun, demanding to know his daughter's location. The two go to Ki-woong and Hye-sun's home, only to find that the landlady has been infected. Suk-gyu and Ki-woong hide in the bathroom as zombies approach them, escaping through the bathroom window and climbing onto the roof. Suk-gyu devises a plan for Ki-woong to draw the zombies' attention while he retrieves a car for them to go find Hye-sun.

At the police station, the bitten officer calls for backup before succumbing to his infection, reanimating and biting another survivor in the cell. Riot police arrive and draw the infected away, allowing Hye-sun and an old man to escape the cell and get into an ambulance. The ambulance crew is oblivious to the crisis. Hye-sun calls Ki-woong and tells him to meet her at the hospital. The old man panics when he realizes that the hospital is already full of the infected. He attempts to stop the ambulance, finally taking the wheel from the driver and causing the vehicle to crash. Hye-sun and the old man flee through the subway tunnels, and when Hye-sun cries that she wants to go home, the old man cries that he has no home to go home to. Meanwhile, Suk-gyu and Ki-woong discover that zombies have taken over the hospital. They locate the overturned ambulance and continue their search.

Outside Hoehyeon Station, Ki-woong calls Hye-sun, but their conversation alerts the nearby infected. A group of survivors fighting off the infected call Hye-sun and the old man to a makeshift barricade. The two are saved, only to find their next exit quarantined by riot police who believe the crisis to be an insurrection. On the other side of the quarantine, Suk-gyu and Ki-woong fail to persuade the riot police to let them through and are told martial law could be declared. As survivors crowd the quarantine, riot police use water cannons against survivors attempting to climb out. After delivering a speech on his poor position in society, the old man attempts to climb out of the quarantine, but he is shot down by the summoned military. The military launches smoke grenades into the quarantine, and the infected overrun the barricade; Hye-sun narrowly escapes with the help of a stranger.

Hye-sun finds an empty model apartment and notifies Ki-woong of her location. Ki-woong finds Hye-sun and reunites her with her father, only to discover that Suk-gyu is actually her previous pimp. Suk-gyu says that Hye-sun still owes him money after running away from him, even though he has already stolen from her late father. Ki-woong tries to subdue Suk-gyu with a knife, but the latter takes the knife from the former and kills him. Hye-sun flees and tries to hide, but Suk-gyu finds her and beats her. As Suk-gyu prepares to rape her, Hye-sun dies. Suk-gyu frantically begins CPR, but then he notices a scratch on Hye-sun's foot and realizes that she is infected. As Hye-sun reanimates and kills Suk-gyu, the camera zooms past a dead Ki-woong and the infected overrunning the quarantine.

== Cast ==
- Shim Eun-kyung as Hye-sun
- Ryu Seung-ryong as Suk-gyu
- Lee Joon as Ki-woong

== Release ==
The film debuted on 5 April 2016 at the Brussels International Fantastic Film Festival. Created by Yeon San-ho, this animated film is considered as the prequel to his critically acclaimed movie, Train to Busan. American distributor Filmrise released the DVD and Blu-ray versions of Seoul Station on 25 July 2017.

The film had special screening in the Korean Horizons section of the 25th New York Asian Film Festival on 13 July 2026 as part of the 25th anniversary of the festival.

== Reception ==
On the review aggregator website Rotten Tomatoes, 100% of 24 critics' reviews are positive, with an average rating of 7.0/10. The website's consensus reads: "Thrilling and relentless from start to finish, Yeon Sang-ho's Seoul Station is a layered and vicious entry into the zombie genre." Clarence Tsui of The Hollywood Reporter called the film "a simple, thrilling ride through a fiend-infested world." James Marsh of South China Morning Post gave a rating of 3/5. He commented that the film addresses South Korea's societal issues including prostitution and homelessness. Gwilym Mumford of The Guardian also gave the film a 3/5 rating. He stated that this film is different from Train to Busan because it focuses on the "desperate souls trapped in life's margins." According to Box Office Mojo, the film has a cumulative gross of $2,021,735 worldwide.
