= The Killer's Shopping List =

2022 South Korean television series

- Promotional poster
- Also known as: The Murderer's Shopping List
- Hangul: 살인자의 쇼핑목록
- Hanja: 殺人者의 쇼핑目錄
- RR: Sarinjaui syopingmongnok
- MR: Sarinjaŭi syop'ingmongnok
- Genre: Comedy; Mystery; Thriller
- Based on: The Murderer's Shopping List by Kang Ji-young
- Developed by: Studio Dragon
- Written by: Han Ji-wan
- Directed by: Lee Eon-hee
- Starring: Lee Kwang-soo; Kim Seol-hyun; Jin Hee-kyung
- Music by: Hwang Chan-hee
- Country of origin: South Korea
- Original language: Korean
- No. of episodes: 8

Production
- Running time: 60 minutes
- Production company: Beyond J

Original release
- Network: tvN
- Release: April 27 – May 19, 2022

Related
- A Shop for Killers

The Killer's Shopping List (Korean: 살인자의 쇼핑목록) is a South Korean television series starring Lee Kwang-soo, Kim Seol-hyun, and Jin Hee-kyung. It aired on tvN from April 27 to May 19, 2022, every Wednesday and Thursday at 22:30 (KST) for 8 episodes.

== Synopsis ==
It tells the story of Ahn Dae-sung (Lee Kwang-soo) and Do Ah-hee (Kim Seol-hyun) setting out to find the murderer after a body was found near the apartment where Ah-hee resides.

== Cast ==
=== Main ===
- Lee Kwang-soo as Ahn Dae-sung

He used to be a memorization genius, but has failed the 9th-grade civil service exam for 3 years, resulting in him being unable to find other jobs and having to work in MS Mart owned by his mother Han Myeong-sook.

- Kim Seol-hyun as Do Ah-hee

Dae-sung's girlfriend who is a police officer from the Odong district.

- Jin Hee-kyung as Han Myeong-sook

Dae-sung's supportive and caring mother who owns the MS Mart.

=== Supporting ===
==== People around Ahn Dae-sung ====
- Shin Sung-woo as Ahn Young-choon

Dae-sung's father and Myeong-sook's husband.

- Lee Gyo-yeop as Jeong-yuk

An employee of MS Mart and close friend of Dae-sung.

==== People around Do Ah-hee ====
- Lee Yoon-hee as Kim Doo-hyun

A good-hearted, compassionate police officer who helps a young ex-convict get back into society. Doo-hyun is someone who knows all about the events of 10-year-old Dae-sung at MS Mart and is always taking care of him.

- Bae Myung-jin as Detective Ji Woong

==== MS Mart people ====
- Oh Hye-won as Ya-chae

An employee of MS Mart's vegetable department.

- Kim Mi-hwa as Gong-san

An employee of MS Mart with 10 years of experience.

- Jo Aram as Al-ba

An part-timer employee with 7 years of experience.

- Park Ji-bin as Saeng-sun

An employee of MS Mart's seafood department.

==== Others ====
- Moon Hee-kyung as Young-sun

Nau-dong's daughter-in-law as the president of a neighborhood woman with a beautiful appearance and arrogant personality.

- Kwon So-hyun as Lee Kyung-ah

MS Mart's loyal customers at major events happening at the mall.

- Jang Won-young as Oh Cheon-won
- Ryu Yeon-seok as Seo Cheon-gyu

Seo Yul's father.

- Ahn Se-bin as Seo Yul

=== Special appearance ===
- Park Chul-min as Ah-hee's father

== Production ==
On February 23, 2022, the photos from the script reading held in Sangam-dong, Seoul were published.

== Original soundtrack ==
=== Part 1 ===
Released on April 28, 2022
No.	Title	Lyrics	Music	Artist	Length
1.	"Why, Why, Why, Why?" (왜,왜,왜,왜)	Kim Tae-gyun; Park Jeong-beom	Kim Tae-gyun; Lee Kwan-hyung; Park Jeong-beom; SungA; Hwang Chan-hee	6band	3:01
2.	"Why, Why, Why, Why?" (왜,왜,왜,왜; Inst.)		Kim Tae-gyun; Lee Kwan-hyung; Park Jeong-beom; SungA; Hwang Chan-hee		3:01
Total length:					6:02

=== Part 2 ===
Released on May 5, 2022
No.	Title	Lyrics	Music	Artist	Length
1.	"Orange Dream"	Q.PD (Chansline)	Q.PD (Chansline); Hwang Chan-hee	Nokdu	4:36
2.	"Orange Dream" (Inst.)		Q.PD (Chansline); Hwang Chan-hee		4:36
Total length:					9:12

=== Part 3 ===
Released on May 12, 2022
No.	Title	Lyrics	Music	Artist	Length
1.	"Nothing"	Antaswell (Chansline)	Jang Joo-na (Chansline); Antaswell (Chansline); Hwang Chan-hee	Koonta	3:02
2.	"Nothing" (Inst.)		Jang Joo-na (Chansline); Antaswell (Chansline); Hwang Chan-hee		3:02
Total length:					6:04

=== Part 4 ===
Released on May 19, 2022
No.	Title	Lyrics	Music	Artist	Length
1.	"Que Sera Sera"	Choi Min-ji (Chansline)	Choi Min-ji (Chansline); Kim Si-won (Chansline); Kim Seong-min (Chansline); Hwang Chan-hee	Lim Yeon	3:32
2.	"Que Sera Sera" (Inst.)		Choi Min-ji (Chansline); Kim Si-won (Chansline); Kim Seong-min (Chansline); Hwang Chan-hee		3:32
Total length:					7:04

== Viewership ==
The Killer's Shopping List : South Korea viewers per episode (thousands)

Season	Episode number								Average
Season	1	2	3	4	5	6	7	8	Average
1	816	786	570	640	535	735	571	866	690

Source: Audience measurement performed nationwide by Nielsen Korea.

Average TV viewership ratings
Ep.	Original broadcast date	Average audience share (Nielsen Korea)	
Ep.	Original broadcast date	Nationwide	Seoul
1	April 27, 2022	3.625% (1st)	4.034% (1st)
2	April 28, 2022	3.482% (2nd)	3.759% (2nd)
3	May 4, 2022	2.443% (2nd)	2.398% (3rd)
4	May 5, 2022	2.793% (2nd)	2.534% (2nd)
5	May 11, 2022	2.253% (2nd)	2.207% (3rd)
6	May 12, 2022	3.270% (2nd)	3.217% (2nd)
7	May 18, 2022	2.517% (2nd)	2.721% (2nd)
8	May 19, 2022	3.688% (2nd)	3.808% (2nd)
Average		3.009%	3.085%
In the table above, the blue numbers represent the lowest ratings and the red numbers represent the highest ratings.; This drama airs on a cable channel/pay TV which normally has a relatively smaller audience compared to free-to-air TV/public broadcasters (KBS, SBS, MBC and EBS).
