= A Love Other Than Yours =

2026 South Korean television series

- Promotional poster
- Hangul: 너 말고 다른 연애
- Lit.: A Romance with Someone Other Than You
- RR: Neo malgo dareun yeonae
- MR: Nŏ malgo tarŭn yŏnae
- Genre: Romance; Melodrama
- Written by: Yoo Soo-ji
- Directed by: Hwang Seung-ki; Lee Ga-ram
- Starring: Seo Kang-joon; Ahn Eun-jin; Lee Joo-ahn; Jo Aram
- Music by: Baek Sung-jin
- Country of origin: South Korea
- Original language: Korean
- No. of episodes: 14

Production
- Executive producer: Yoon Jae-hyeok
- Producers: Kim Soo-jin; Bae Sung-soo
- Cinematography: Yeom Ho-wang; Jung Seung-hwan; Lee Eun-bi; Yoon Tae-hoon
- Editors: Kim Byung-rok; Lee Soo-ji
- Running time: 63–64 minutes
- Production companies: Uni Chem; A Love Other Than Yours Culture Industry Specialized Company

Original release
- Network: KBS2
- Release: September 12 – November 1, 2026

A Love Other Than Yours (Korean: 너 말고 다른 연애) is a 2026 South Korean romance melodrama television series written by Yoo Soo-ji, directed by Hwang Seung-ki and Lee Ga-ram, and starring Seo Kang-joon, Ahn Eun-jin, Lee Joo-ahn, and Jo Aram. The series follows the emotional shifts of long-term couples who encounter new romantic interests while approaching marriage. It aired on KBS2 from September 12, to November 1, 2026, every Saturday and Sunday at 21:20 (KST). It is also available for streaming on Amazon Prime Video.

== Synopsis ==
The series tells the story of Namgung Ho and Lee Mi-do, a couple who have been dating for 10 years. As unfamiliar feelings emerge between them, their relationship begins to change. Namgoong Ho is an office worker who, after facing doubts about his long-term relationship, makes a bold proposal. Lee Mi-do is a film director who becomes conflicted after meeting a new love interest despite having a boyfriend.

== Cast and characters ==
=== Main ===
- Seo Kang-joon as Namgung Ho

Ace of TF Snack Team 3 at Hunmin Confectionery.

- Ahn Eun-jin as Lee Mi-do

A film director.

- Lee Joo-ahn as Han Tae-seung

An attorney at Jaekang Law Firm.

- Jo Aram as Park Su-a

The new member of TF Snack Team 3 at Hunmin Confectionery.

=== Supporting ===
Mi-do's family

- Kim Mi-kyung as Ma Suk-hui

Mi-do's mother and the owner of Queens Hair Salon.

- Kim Nam-hee as Lee Young-do

Mi-do's older brother, who is the CEO of a cleaning company.

- Lee Min-jae as Lee Wan-do

Mi-do's younger brother, a former freediver, lives with guilt following the loss of his lover. He runs a karaoke bar.

- Hur Ji-na as Go Mun-yeong

Sang-su's mother and a private academy instructor.

- Lee Joo-won as Lee Sang-su

A middle school student addicted to short-form content.

Hunmin Confectionery

- Lee Jun-hyeok as Eom Ho-sik

Manager of TF Snack Team 3 at Hunmin Confectionery.

- Kim Hyun-mok as Baek Sang-hun

A member of TF Snack Team 3 at Hunmin Confectionery.

Jaekang Law Firm

- Kwak Si-yang as Seo Jae-hyuk

Managing Partner at Jaekang Law Firm.

Su-a's place

- Kim Seung-hee as Ji Su-yeon

Su-a's friend.

Film Industry

- Cheon Yi-seul as Oh Yeon-ju

PD at Nobu Film Production.

- Song Ji-woo as Song Hae-na

An arrogant top actress.

- Jung Saet-byeol as Hong Jang-mi

Mi-do's junior 1.

- Kang Pil-jun as Kim Guk-jin

Mi-do's junior 2.

- Park Ju-eun as Go Yeong-rae

Mi-do's junior 3.

Others

- Choi Hee-jin as Choi Hwa-yeong

Ho's mother.

=== Special appearance ===
- Oh Dong-min as an actor in Mi-do's film

== Episodes ==
No.	Title	Original release date
1	"Will Ten Years Together End in Marriage or a Breakup?"; Transliteration: "10nyeoneul yeonaehan uri gyeolhonhalkkayo? Gyeolbyeolhalkkayo?" (Korean: 10년을 연애한 우리 결혼할까요? 결별할까요?)	September 12, 2026
2	"Can We Ever Be Strangers?"; Transliteration: "Uriga nami doel su isseulkka?" (Korean: 우리가 남이 될 수 있을까?)	September 13, 2026
3	"Can We Feel That Spark Again?"; Transliteration: "Uriga dasi seollel su isseulkka?" (Korean: 우리가 다시 설렐 수 있을까?)	September 19, 2026
4	"Are We Dreaming the Same Dream?"; Transliteration: "Urineun gateun kkumeul kkugo isseulkka?" (Korean: 우리는 같은 꿈을 꾸고 있을까?)	September 20, 2026
5	"Are There Any Untold Stories Between Us?"; Transliteration: "Uriegedo bihaindeu sini isseulkka?" (Korean: 우리에게도 비하인드 신이 있을까?)	October 3, 2026
6	"Who Is Our Best Hero?"; Transliteration: "Uriga aneun choegoui hieoroneun?" (Korean: 우리가 아는 최고의 히어로는?)	October 4, 2026
7	"Are We Allies or Enemies?"; Transliteration: "Urineun [agun]ilkka? [Jeokgun]ilkka?" (Korean: 우리는 [아군]일까? [적군]일까?)	October 10, 2026
8	"What Remains of Our Passionate Love?"; Transliteration: "Uriga tteugeopge saranghan jarie nameun geoseun?" (Korean: 우리가 뜨겁게 사랑한 자리에 남은 것은?)	October 11, 2026
9	"Do You Remember When We Fell in Love?"; Transliteration: "Uriga cheonnune banhan sunganeun?" (Korean: 우리가 첫눈에 반한 순간은?)	October 17, 2026
10	"What Do Our Scars Look Like?"; Transliteration: "Uriui hyungteoneun museun moyangilkka?" (Korean: 우리의 흉터는 무슨 모양일까?)	October 18, 2026
11	"How Do We Love, How Do We Live?"; Transliteration: "Uriga saranghaneun, saraganeun bangbeobeun?" (Korean: 우리가 사랑하는, 살아가는 방법은?)	October 24, 2026
12	"Who Do We Love the Most?"; Transliteration: "Uriga gajang saranghaneun sarameun nugulkka?" (Korean: 우리가 가장 사랑하는 사람은 누굴까?)	October 25, 2026
13	"Who Will We Be With in Ten Years?"; Transliteration: "Urineun 10nyeon hue nuguwa isseulkka?" (Korean: 우리는 10년 후에 누구와 있을까?)	October 31, 2026
14	"What Brought Us Together?"; Transliteration: "Uriga mannam iyuneun?" (Korean: 우리가 만난 이유는?)	November 1, 2026

== Production ==
=== Development ===
The series is co-directed by Hwang Seung-ki, who helmed The Matchmakers (2023) and Memorials (2020), and Lee Ga-ram. The screenplay was written by rookie writer Yoo Soo-ji, marking her first miniseries, and production was handled by Uni Chem.

=== Casting ===
In late 2025, Seo Kang-joon had been cast in the lead role of Namgung Ho. His character is described as an office worker embroiled in a complex emotional conflict following a "shocking proposal" and the instability of a long-term relationship.

On January 28, 2026, Ahn Eun-jin was reported to be in talks for the female lead. Her agency, UAA, confirmed that she was "positively reviewing" the script for the role of Lee Mi-do. Ahn's character is described as a charismatic and sensual film director who experiences confusion upon meeting a new love interest despite having a long-term boyfriend. Seo and Ahn's appearances were confirmed by March 2026, with Lee Joo-ahn and Jo Aram joining the cast as the secondary couple. Lee Min-jae, Kim Nam-hee, Kwak Si-yang, Cheon Yi-seul, and Song Ji-woo were cast for supporting roles.

== Release ==
A Love Other Than Yours was slated for broadcast on KBS2 in the second half of 2026. Later, the series was confirmed to premiere on September 12, airing every Saturday and Sunday at 21:20 (KST). It is also available for streaming on Amazon Prime Video.

== Viewership ==
A Love Other Than Yours : South Korea viewers per episode (thousands)

Season	Episode number													
Season	1	2	3	4	5	6	7	8	9	10	11	12	13	14
1	516	511	488	523	391	444	474	N/A	N/A	N/A	N/A	N/A	N/A	525

Source: Audience measurement performed nationwide by Nielsen Korea.

Average TV viewership ratings
Ep.	Original broadcast date	Average audience share (Nielsen Korea)	
Ep.	Original broadcast date	Nationwide	Seoul
1	September 12, 2026	2.6% (19th)	2.1% (23rd)
2	September 13, 2026	2.8% (13th)	2.6% (12th)
3	September 19, 2026	2.5% (16th)	2.1% (20th)
4	September 20, 2026	2.6% (17th)	2.6% (14th)
5	October 3, 2026	2.1% (21st)	1.7% (25th)
6	October 4, 2026	2.3% (18th)	N/A
7	October 10, 2026	2.3% (27th)	2.0% (26th)
8	October 11, 2026	1.9% (30th)	N/A
9	October 17, 2026	1.8% (34th)	1.3% (NR)
10	October 18, 2026	1.8% (36th)	N/A
11	October 24, 2026	1.8% (32nd)	1.6% (NR)
12	October 25, 2026	1.9% (34th)	1.9% (26th)
13	October 31, 2026	1.6% (35th)	N/A
14	November 1, 2026	2.4% (27th)	2.3% (23rd)
Average		2.2%	— (Note: Due to multiple unpublished ratings, the exact average rating is unknown.)
In the table above, the blue numbers represent the lowest ratings and the red numbers represent the highest ratings.; N/A denotes ratings that were not published.; NR denotes that the drama did not rank in the top 20 daily programs on that date.
