= Doctor Cha =

2023 South Korean television series

- Promotional poster
- Hangul: 닥터 차정숙
- Lit.: Doctor Cha Jeong-suk
- RR: Dakteo Cha Jeongsuk
- MR: Takt'ŏ Ch'a Chŏngsuk
- Genre: Medical; Comedy; Family drama
- Written by: Jung Yeo-rang
- Directed by: Kim Dae-jin; Kim Jung-wook
- Starring: Uhm Jung-hwa; Kim Byung-chul; Myung Se-bin; Min Woo-hyuk
- Music by: Jeon Jong-hyuk
- Country of origin: South Korea
- Original language: Korean
- No. of episodes: 16

Production
- Executive producers: Lee Kyung-sik; Jang Kyung-ik; Shin Dae-sik
- Producers: Production team: Kim Woo-taek; Lim Jong-hwa; Kim Jun-sung; Kang Yu-ri
- Production companies: Studio&NEW; SLL; JCN
- Budget: ₩15 billion

Original release
- Network: JTBC
- Release: April 15 – June 4, 2023

Doctor Cha (Korean: 닥터 차정숙) is a 2023 South Korean television series starring Uhm Jung-hwa in the title role, along with Kim Byung-chul, Myung Se-bin, and Min Woo-hyuk. It aired on JTBC from April 15 to June 4, 2023, every Saturday and Sunday at 22:30 (KST) for 16 episodes. It is also available for streaming on TVING in South Korea and on Netflix in selected regions.

The series was a commercial hit and became one of the highest-rated series in Korean cable television history.

== Synopsis ==
The series follows the story of Cha Jeong-suk, a housewife of twenty years who becomes a first-year medical resident.

== Cast ==
=== Main ===
- Uhm Jung-hwa as Cha Jeong-seok: a full-time housewife of twenty years who decides to return to her medical career after surviving an unexpected crisis.
  - Park Joo-won as young Cha Jeong-seok
- Kim Byung-chul as Seo In-ho: the perfectionist husband of Jeong-suk and the chief surgeon at a university hospital, who has an affair with his first love Seung-hee, and is the father of her illegitimate daughter who is the same age as his daughter.
  - Park Tae-in as young Seo In-ho
- Myung Se-bin as Choi Seung-hee: In-ho's first love who is a family medicine professor and is mother to In-Ho's illegitimate daughter.
  - Moon Ye-jin as young Choi Seung-hee
- Min Woo-hyuk as Roy Kim: a charismatic surgeon who gets entangled with Jeong-suk. He was adopted by American parents and tries to find his biological family by registering his DNA

=== Supporting ===
- Song Ji-ho as Seo Jung-min: Jeong-suk and In-ho's son who is a first-year surgical resident.
- Jo Aram as Jeon So-ra: Jung-min's girlfriend who is a third-year surgical resident.
- Baek Joo-hee as Baek Mi-hee: Jeong-suk's friend who is a dermatologist.
- Park Joon-geum as Kwak Ae-sim: In-ho's mother and Jeong-suk's mother-in-law.
- Kim Mi-kyung as Oh Deok-rye: Jeong-suk's mother who works as a caregiver in a geriatric hospital.
- Lee Seo-yeon as Seo Yi-rang: Jeong-suk and In-ho's daughter.
- So A-rin as Choi Eun-seo / Seo Eun-seo: Seung-hee and In-ho's daughter. Yi-rang and Jung-min's half sister
- Park Chul-min as Yoon Tae-sik: the chief of surgery department.
- Kim Byung-chun as Im Jong-kwon: the chief of the family medicine department.
- Lim Hyun-soo as Lee Do-gyeom: a first-year resident in the family medicine department.
- Kim Ye-eun as Min Chae-yoon: an intern in the family medicine department.

=== Extended ===
- Jo Eun-yoo as Hwang Mi-ra: a surgeon at a university hospital.
- Song Young-ah as Park Ji-yeon: a third-year chief resident.
- Song Young-chang as Chairman Oh Chang-gyu: a VIP patient.
- Sung Byung-sook as Jang Hae-nam: a patient who was imprisoned for killing her husband.
- Kim Hyun-mok as Hwang Seong-gyu: a patient who has Crohn's disease.
- Seo Yoon-ji as Seo-yeon: Seong-gyu's wife.
- Nam Myeong-ryeol as Park Ho-won

=== Special appearances ===
- Kang Ji-young as Yoo Ji-seon: a single mother.
- Choi Eun-kyung as a shaman

== Release ==
It was reported that Doctor Cha was initially scheduled for release in October 2022. However, in November 2022, JTBC announced that the series was included in their 2023 drama lineup.

== Original soundtrack ==
The original soundtrack for Doctor Cha includes five singles, released between April 15 and May 20, 2023. These singles, as well as 46 score tracks, were later included in the original soundtrack album for Doctor Cha, released on June 3, 2023 by Music&NEW.

=== Part 1 ===
Released on April 15, 2023
No.	Title	Lyrics	Music	Artist	Length
1.	"Alone" (홀로)	Song Yang-ha; Kim Jae-hyun; Gong Hye-won	Song Yang-ha; Kim Jae-hyun; Gong Hye-won	Rothy	2:50
2.	"Alone" (Inst.)				2:50
Total length:					5:40

=== Part 2 ===
Released on April 22, 2023
No.	Title	Lyrics	Music	Artist	Length
1.	"Shine Like a Star"	Song Yang-ha; Kim Jae-hyun; Lee Jua	Song Yang-ha; Kim Jae-hyun; Lee Jua; Vlue	Sondia	2:43
2.	"Shine Like a Star" (Inst.)				2:43
Total length:					5:26

=== Part 3 ===
Released on April 29, 2023
No.	Title	Lyrics	Music	Artist	Length
1.	"Breath" (숨)	Ha Hyung-eon; Susan; Jeon Jong-hyeok	Ha Hyung-eon; Susan	Jung Seung-hwan	3:41
2.	"Breath" (Inst.)				3:41
Total length:					7:22

=== Part 4 ===
Released on May 13, 2023
No.	Title	Lyrics	Music	Artist	Length
1.	"After This Night" (이 밤이 지나면)	Kim Su-bin (Aiming); No Young-won	Kim Chang-rak (Aiming); Kim Su-bin (Aiming); No Young-won	Park Min-hye	4:16
2.	"After This Night" (Inst.)				4:16
Total length:					8:32

=== Part 5 ===
Released on May 20, 2023
No.	Title	Lyrics	Music	Artist	Length
1.	"A Day For Me" (나를 위한 하루)	Jeon Jong-hyeok; Heo Seok	Jeon Jong-hyeok; Heo Seok	Shinae An	2:28
2.	"A Day For Me" (Inst.)				2:28
Total length:					4:56

== Reception ==
=== Viewership ===
Doctor Cha : South Korea viewers per episode (millions)

Season	Episode number																Average
Season	1	2	3	4	5	6	7	8	9	10	11	12	13	14	15	16	Average
1	1.125	1.644	1.700	2.330	2.437	2.846	2.856	3.696	3.411	4.061	3.552	4.005	3.143	4.088	3.232	4.030	3.010

Source: Audience measurement performed nationwide by Nielsen Korea.

Average TV viewership ratings
Ep.	Original broadcast date	Average audience share (Nielsen Korea)	
Ep.	Original broadcast date	Nationwide	Seoul
1	April 15, 2023	4.937% (1st)	5.464% (1st)
2	April 16, 2023	7.780% (1st)	8.632% (1st)
3	April 22, 2023	7.814% (1st)	8.488% (1st)
4	April 23, 2023	11.205% (1st)	11.715% (1st)
5	April 29, 2023	10.856% (1st)	12.007% (1st)
6	April 30, 2023	13.203% (1st)	13.317% (1st)
7	May 6, 2023	12.874% (1st)	13.019% (1st)
8	May 7, 2023	16.181% (1st)	16.868% (1st)
9	May 13, 2023	15.588% (1st)	15.708% (1st)
10	May 14, 2023	17.958% (1st)	18.925% (1st)
11	May 20, 2023	16.225% (1st)	17.059% (1st)
12	May 21, 2023	18.493% (1st)	19.336% (1st)
13	May 27, 2023	14.420% (1st)	14.560% (1st)
14	May 28, 2023	18.168% (1st)	17.920% (1st)
15	June 3, 2023	14.676% (1st)	14.742% (1st)
16	June 4, 2023	18.546% (1st)	19.383% (1st)
Average		13.683%	14.196%
In the table above, the blue numbers represent the lowest ratings and the red numbers represent the highest ratings.; This series aired on a cable channel/pay TV which normally has a relatively smaller audience compared to free-to-air TV/public broadcasters (KBS, SBS, MBC, and EBS).

=== Accolades ===
==== Awards and nominations ====
Name of the award ceremony, year presented, category, nominee of the award, and the result of the nomination
Award ceremony	Year	Category	Nominee / Work	Result	Ref.
APAN Star Awards	2023	Top Excellence Award, Actress in a Miniseries	Uhm Jung-hwa	Won	
APAN Star Awards	2023	Excellence Acting Award, Actress	Myung Se-bin	Nominated	
APAN Star Awards	2023	Best New Actress	Jo Aram	Won	
Baeksang Arts Awards	2024	Best Actress	Uhm Jung-hwa	Nominated	
Brand of the Year Awards	2023	Best New Actress	Jo Aram	Won	
KCA Consumer Rights Day Awards	2023	Viewers' Choice Actor of the Year	Uhm Jung-hwa	Won	
KCA Consumer Rights Day Awards	2023	Best Director	Kim Dae-jin	Won	
KCA Consumer Rights Day Awards	2023	Best Director	Kim Jung-wook	Won	
KCA Consumer Rights Day Awards	2023	Best Screenplay	Jung Yeo-rang	Won	
KCA Consumer Rights Day Awards	2023	Best Production Company	SLL	Won	
KCA Consumer Rights Day Awards	2023	Best Production Company	Studio&NEW	Won	
New York Festivals TV and Film Awards	2023	Entertainment Special, Mini-series	Doctor Cha	Finalist	

==== Listicle ====
Publisher	Year	Listicle	Placement	Ref.
Time	2023	The 10 Best Korean Dramas of 2023 on Netflix	Included	

== Remake ==
The Turkish adaptation, Bahar, began being broadcast on Show TV in February 13, 2024. The protagonist is played by Demet Evgar.

The Indian adaptation, Dr. Aarambhi being broadcast on Colors TV from 27 January 2026. The protagonist is being played by Aishwarya Khare.
