= Cine Q =

South Korean movie theater chain

- Company type: Division
- Industry: Entertainment
- Founded: 2017
- Headquarters: Seoul
- Area served: South Korea
- Parent: Next Entertainment World
- Website: Official Website

Cine Q, formerly known as Cine Station Q, is a South Korean movie theater chain. It has 41 screens in 6 theatres in South Korea.
