= Project Silence =

2023 South Korean film

- Theatrical release poster
- Hangul: 탈출: 프로젝트 사일런스
- Hanja: 脫出: 프로젝트 사일런스
- Lit.: Escape: Project Silence
- RR: Talchul: peurojekteu sailleonseu
- MR: T'alch'ul: p'ŭrojekt'ŭ saillŏnsŭ
- Directed by: Kim Tae-gon
- Written by: Kim Tae-gon; Park Joo-suk; Kim Yong-hwa
- Produced by: Kim Yong-hwa; Seo Ho-jin; Jeon Pil-do
- Starring: Lee Sun-kyun; Ju Ji-hoon; Kim Hee-won; Kim Su-an; Park Ju-hyun; Ye Soo-jung; Moon Sung-keun; Kim Tae-woo
- Cinematography: Hong Kyung-pyo
- Edited by: Heo Seon-mi; Jo Han-ol; Lee Geon-moon
- Music by: Shim Hyun-jung
- Production companies: CJ Entertainment; Blaad Studio
- Distributed by: CJ Entertainment Encore Films/Warner Bros. (Singapore)
- Release dates: May 21, 2023 (Cannes); July 12, 2024 (South Korea); July 11, 2024 (Singapore); August 7, 2024 (Philippines)
- Running time: 96 minutes
- Country: South Korea
- Budget: US$15 million
- Box office: US$6.3 million

Project Silence (Korean: 탈출: 프로젝트 사일런스; RR: Talchul: peurojekteu sailleonseu) is a 2023 South Korean disaster thriller film co-written and directed by Kim Tae-gon. It was screened at the Midnight Screening section in the 76th Cannes Film Festival on May 21, 2023.The film stars Lee Sun-kyun, Ju Ji-hoon, Kim Hee-won, Kim Su-an, Park Ju-hyun, Ye Soo-jung, Moon Sung-keun and Kim Tae-woo.The film was released theatrically in South Korea on July 12, 2024.

== Plot ==
The airport bridge is on the verge of collapse, and all survivors have become targets. Due to worsening weather conditions, the airport bridge has become unpredictable. People are isolated on the bridge, which is on the verge of collapse due to a chain of collisions and an explosion. Amidst this chaos, the military experimental dogs of 'Project Silence', which were being transported in secret, are released, and all survivors become their targets. These dogs indiscriminately attack the survivors, creating an uncontrollable situation.

It is revealed that the dogs are originally developed to be a far more effective rescue dogs by making them react to human voices so they can come and rescue the victims. However, the South Korean military with the backing of the US and many European governments decide to turn the dogs into powerful attack dogs to hunt and eliminate terrorists instead, giving birth to Project Silence. The project eventually failed since the dogs are uncontrollable as they often attack its handlers. It is revealed the dogs aggression is due to E9, the dog who is the genetic basis for all the dogs. Several litters of her puppies were vivisected in front of her to make her vicious. Dr. Yang reveals she is hunting the survivors to get even with humans for harming her children.

Joe Park, Miran, Jung-Won, Kyung-Min, Dr. Yang, Yoo-Ra, and Joe’s dog Jodie manage to escape from the bridge just before it collapses. They are greeting by the press, emergency responders, and Hyun Baek. Dr. Yang and Jung-Won reveal his crimes in front of the media.

E9 and one of her puppies survive after they swim ashore and stare at the collapsed bridge.

== Cast ==
- Lee Sun-kyun as Cha Jung-won, a presidential aide who is trapped on the airport bridge after disaster strikes.
- Ju Ji-hoon as Joe Park, a tow truck driver.
- Kim Hee-won as Doctor Yang, the head researcher of "Project Silence".
- Moon Sung-keun as Byeong-hak
- Ye Soo-jung as Soon-ok
- Kim Tae-woo as Jung Hyun-baek
- Park Hee-von as Mi-ran
- Park Ju-hyun as Shim Yoo-ra
- Kim Su-an as Cha Kyung-min, Jung-won's daughter.
- Ha Do-kwon as Captain Kang

== See also ==
- Project Wolf Hunting
