= NEW ID =

South Korean digital streaming service

- Type: Subsidiary
- Industry: Entertainment, media
- Founded: October 7, 2019; 6 years ago in South Korea
- Headquarters: Gangnam, Seoul, South Korea
- Area served: Worldwide
- Key people: June Park (CEO), Johan Kim (Co-Founder)
- Products: Streaming service, Television/FAST channels, platform CMS, AI Post Production, BINGE Korea
- Parent: Next Entertainment World
- Website: its-newid.com

NEW ID is a digital streaming service and television channel established in 2019 that broadcasts Korean entertainment content, including K-dramas, K-pop, and Korean movies. It is available on various international platforms such as Xumo, LG Channels, Pluto TV, and Samsung TV Plus.

== History ==
NEW ID was founded in 2019, initially available on platforms such as Xumo and LG TV. Over time, it expanded its offerings to include Samsung TV Plus, aiming to reach a broader international audience in the US.

== Content and Programming ==
NEW ID broadcasts a variety of Korean programming, ranging from K-dramas and K-pop concerts to classic Korean movies. The service regularly updates its content library and has obtained FAST/AVOD broadcasting rights for several shows and events. Additionally, NEW ID distributes content from other Asian markets, including channels like OnDemand China and Rakuten Viki.

- NEW KPOP
- NEW KMOVIES
- NEW KFOOD
- My Little Pet
- PINKFONG BABY SHARK TV
- RAKUTEN VIKI
- ON DEMAND CHINA
- World Billiards TV
- Toony Planet
- MUBEAT
- SBS KDrama
- ROMCOM K-DRAMA
- YTN News

== BINGE Korea ==
BINGE Korea is another streaming service focusing on Korean content. In 2023, it was made available on BMW's in-car systems, allowing vehicle owners to access its content through the multimedia systems. BINGE Korea also expanded its availability in the United States by launching on several major streaming devices and platforms including Samsung, LG, Roku, and Amazon Fire TV.

=== Launched Platforms (BINGE Korea) ===
- Samsung
- LG
- Roku
- Amazon Fire TV
- VIZIO
