= Jin Hee-kyung =

South Korean actress (born 1968)

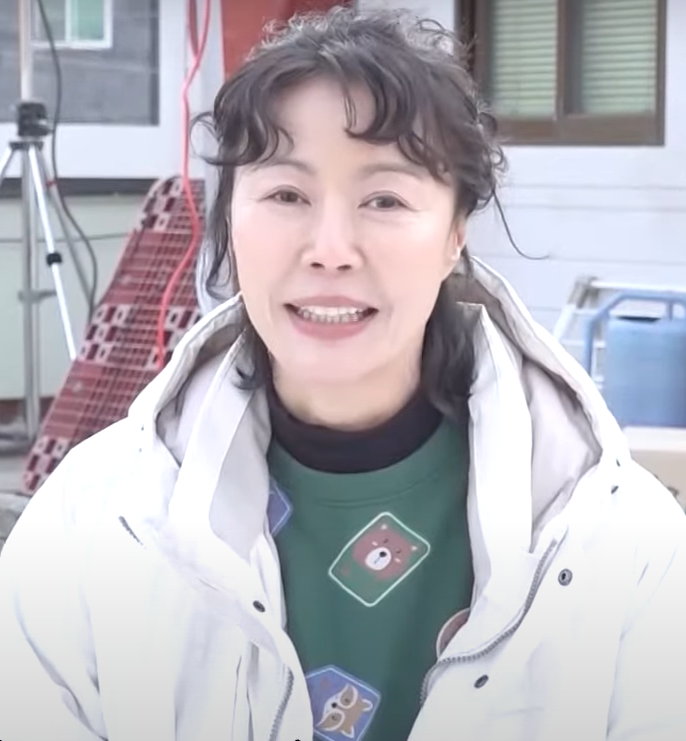
- Jin in May 2022
- Born: September 7, 1968 (age 58); Iri, North Jeolla, South Korea
- Education: Kunsan National University
- Occupation: Actress • model • TV host
- Years active: 1994–present
- Agent: C-JeS Entertainment

Korean name
- Hangul: 진희경
- Hanja: 陳熙瓊
- RR: Jin Huigyeong
- MR: Chin Hŭigyŏng

Jin Hee-kyung (Korean: 진희경; born September 7, 1968) is a South Korean actress.

== Filmography ==
=== Film ===
Year	Title	Role
1994	Coffee, Copy and a Bloody Nose	Kang Ji-soo
1994	Deep Scratch	Oh Hye-ran
1996	The Gingko Bed	Mi-dan
1997	Holiday in Seoul	Leg model
1997	Motel Cactus	Choi Hyun-joo
1998	Girls' Night Out	Yeon
1999	A Growing Business	President Wang's wife
2000	General Hospital, the Movie: A Thousand Days	Lee Seung-hyun
2000	Plum Blossom	Yun Jeong-hye
2000	Jakarta	Red
2001	I Wish I Had a Wife	Tae-ran (cameo)
2001	Ciao	Mother
2002	Marrying the Mafia	Won Hye-sook
2004	Dance with Solitude	Soon-ah
2006	Now and Forever	Nurse Won
2011	Sunny	Ha Chun-hwa
2025	Hi-Five	Choon-hwa

=== Television series ===
Year	Title	Role	Network
1998	White Nights 3.98	Oh Seong-shim	SBS
2001	Lovers	Hee-kyung	MBC
2003	Lady Next Door	Kim Soo-mi	MBC
2004	Passion	Seok In-hee	MBC
2005	Sad Love Story	Lee Mi-sook/Audrey, Hye-in's aunt	MBC
2006	Jumong	Yeo Mi-eul	MBC
2011	Poseidon	Hyun Hye-jung	KBS2
2013	The Eldest	Kim Eun-soon	JTBC
2014	The Idle Mermaid	Hong Myung-hee	tvN
2015	Heart to Heart	Hwang Moon-sun	tvN
2015	More Than a Maid	Lady Han	JTBC
2015	My Mom	Na-mi	MBC
2017	Fight for My Way	Hwang Bok-hee	KBS2
2018	Suits	Kang Ha-yeon	KBS2
2019	Doctor Prisoner	Mo Yi-ra	KBS2
2020	When the Weather Is Fine	Shim Myeong-joo	JTBC
2020	Was It Love?	Joo Bong-hye	JTBC
2021	Hello, Me!	Kim Writer (Cameo, Ep.4)	KBS2
2022	The Killer's Shopping List	Jeong Myeong-sook	tvN
2023	The Matchmakers	The Queen	KBS2

== Awards ==
Year	Award	Category	Nominated work
1995	33rd Grand Bell Awards	Best New Actress	Deep Scratch
