= The Auditors =

2024 South Korean television series

- Promotional poster
- Hangul: 감사합니다
- Lit.: Thank You
- RR: Gamsahamnida
- MR: Kamsahamnida
- Genre: Workplace; Action drama
- Developed by: Studio Dragon
- Written by: Choi Min-ho
- Directed by: Kwon Young-il; Joo Sang-gyu
- Starring: Shin Ha-kyun; Lee Jung-ha; Jin Goo; Jo Aram
- Music by: Lim Ha-young
- Country of origin: South Korea
- Original language: Korean
- No. of episodes: 12

Production
- Running time: 70 minutes
- Production company: Filcon Studio

Original release
- Network: tvN
- Release: July 6 – August 11, 2024

The Auditors (Korean: 감사합니다) is a 2024 South Korean television series written by Choi Min-ho, co-directed by Kwon Young-il and Joo Sang-gyu, and starring Shin Ha-kyun, Lee Jung-ha, Jin Goo and Jo Aram. It aired on tvN from July 6, to August 11, 2024, every Saturday and Sunday at 21:20 (KST). It streamed on Viki.

== Synopsis ==
The Auditors tells the story of a talented audit team leader and a young new employee working together to uncover widespread corruption in the company.

== Cast and characters ==
=== Main ===
- Shin Ha-kyun as Shin Cha-il

A pragmatic audit team leader at JU Construction. He is known for his sharp wit and analytical mind.

- Lee Jung-ha as Goo Han-soo

A warm-hearted new employee in the audit office. He is known for his more emotional approach in contrast to Shin Cha-il.

- Jin Goo as Hwang Dae-woong

The vice president of JU Construction.

- Jo Aram as Yoon Seo-jin

A member of the audit office of JU Construction and a new employee of the MZ generation.

- Jung Moon-sung as Hwang Se-woong

Current President of JU Construction.

=== Supporting ===
==== Audit team staff ====
- Hong In as Yeom Kyung-seok

Audit Team Deputy Manager of JU Construction.

- Lee Ji-hyun as Ok Ah-jung

Audit Team Manager of JU Construction.

- Oh Hee-joon as Moon Sang-ho

Audit Team Deputy Manager of JU Construction.

==== JU Construction ====
- Lee Do-yeop as Hwang Geon-woong

Former President of JU Construction.

- Kim Hong-pa as Seo Gil-pyo

Executive Director of JU Construction.

- Baek Hyun-jin as Yang Jae-seung

Managing Director of JU Construction.

- Woo Ji-hyun as Im Jeong Yun

Manager of JU Subcontracts & Procurement Department.

- Jung Dong-hwan as Bang Ki-ho

The major shareholder of JU Construction.

- Lee Joong-ok as Park Jae-hwa

Manager of JU Construction Technology Development Department.

- Lee Chae-kyung as Lim Yoo-sun

Geon-woong's wife.

==== Han-soo's family ====
- Park Soo-young as Goo Suk-goo

Han-soo's father.

- Woo Mi-hwa as Ahn Hye-young

Han-soo's mother.

==== Seo-jin's family ====
- Kim Bi-bi as Lee Mi-jin

Seo-jin's mother.

==== Others ====
- Jeon Su-ji as Chae Jong-u's wife

== Viewership ==
Viewers per episode (millions)

Season	Episode number												Average
Season	1	2	3	4	5	6	7	8	9	10	11	12	Average
1	0.927	1.326	1.220	1.686	1.324	1.787	1.507	1.750	1.194	1.568	1.598	2.143	1.503

Source: Audience measurement performed nationwide by Nielsen Korea.

Average TV viewership ratings
Ep.	Original broadcast date	Average audience share (Nielsen Korea)	
Ep.	Original broadcast date	Nationwide	Seoul
1	July 6, 2024	3.514% (1st)	3.371% (1st)
2	July 7, 2024	5.902% (1st)	6.523% (1st)
3	July 13, 2024	5.262% (1st)	5.688% (1st)
4	July 14, 2024	7.213% (1st)	7.277% (1st)
5	July 20, 2024	5.943% (1st)	6.418% (1st)
6	July 21, 2024	7.314% (1st)	7.492% (1st)
7	July 27, 2024	6.698% (1st)	6.298% (1st)
8	July 28, 2024	7.789% (1st)	8.168% (1st)
9	August 3, 2024	5.463% (1st)	5.958% (1st)
10	August 4, 2024	7.114% (1st)	7.236% (1st)
11	August 10, 2024	7.307% (1st)	7.266% (1st)
12	August 11, 2024	9.543% (1st)	10.126% (1st)
Average		6.589%	6.818%
In the table above, the blue numbers represent the lowest ratings and the red numbers represent the highest ratings.; This drama aired on a cable channel/pay TV which normally has a relatively smaller audience compared to free-to-air TV/public broadcasters (KBS, SBS, MBC, and EBS).

== Accolades ==
=== Listicles ===
Name of publisher, year listed, name of listicle, and placement
Publisher	Year	Listicle	Placement	Ref.
South China Morning Post	2024	The 15 best K-dramas of 2024	7th place	
