= Train to Busan =

2016 film by Yeon Sang-ho

- Theatrical release poster
- Hangul: 부산행
- Hanja: 釜山行
- Lit.: Busan Bound
- RR: Busanhaeng
- MR: Pusanhaeng
- Directed by: Yeon Sang-ho
- Written by: Park Joo-suk
- Produced by: Lee Dong-ha
- Starring: Gong Yoo; Jung Yu-mi; Ma Dong-seok; Kim Su-an; Choi Woo-shik; Ahn So-hee; Kim Eui-sung
- Cinematography: Lee Hyung-deok
- Edited by: Yang Jin-mo
- Music by: Jang Young-gyu
- Production company: RedPeter Film
- Distributed by: Next Entertainment World
- Release dates: May 13, 2016 (Cannes); July 20, 2016 (South Korea)
- Running time: 118 minutes
- Country: South Korea
- Language: Korean
- Budget: $8.5 million
- Box office: $98.5 million

Train to Busan (Korean: 부산행) is a 2016 South Korean action horror film directed by Yeon Sang-ho and written by Park Joo-suk. It stars Gong Yoo, Jung Yu-mi, Ma Dong-seok, Kim Su-an, Choi Woo-shik, Ahn So-hee, and Kim Eui-sung. The film takes place primarily on a KTX from Seoul to Busan as a zombie apocalypse suddenly breaks out in Korean Peninsula and threatens the safety of the passengers.

A co-production between Next Entertainment World and RedPeter Film, Train to Busan premiered in the Midnight Screenings section of the 2016 Cannes Film Festival on May 13. It was released by Next Entertainment World on July 20 in South Korea; by August 7, it became the first Korean film of the year to break the audience record of over 10 million theatergoers. It received positive reviews and was a commercial success, grossing $98.5 million on a budget of $8.5 million.

The film spawned the Train to Busan series, and was followed by the animated prequel Seoul Station (2016) and the standalone sequel Peninsula (2020).

== Plot ==
A deer is hit by a truck and reanimates after the truck leaves. Seok-woo, a cynical workaholic and divorced father in Seoul, South Korea, bungles a birthday present for his estranged daughter Su-an, and missed out on her recital of the Hawaiian folk song "Aloha ʻOe". He agrees with Su-an to take her to see her mother, Na-young, in Busan.

The next day, they board the KTX 101 for Busan at Seoul Station, along with blue-collar worker Sang-hwa and his pregnant wife Seong-kyeong, high-ranking executive Yon-suk, a high school baseball team including player Yong-guk and his cheerleader girlfriend Jin-hee, elderly sisters In-gil and Jong-gil, and a traumatized homeless man. Just before departure, a scraped up woman boards the train unnoticed at the last minute. News reports reveal that an outbreak is occurring across the Korean Peninsula and the scraped up lady then turns into a zombie. She bites and infects a train attendant, sparking a rapid outbreak on the train.

The survivors flee to other carriages and secure the doors, trapping the horde in the process. The train passes through Cheonan station and continues onto Daejeon Station, where a group of soldiers were deployed to keep the infection at bay. Seok-woo is notified that his company sent an extraction team to pick him and Su-an up. After stopping at Daejeon, the passengers disembark from the train, only to find that the soldiers and those from Seok-woo's company had also fallen to the horde. The passengers flee to the train, becoming separated in different carriages in the commotion.

The conductor cancels all stops except for Busan, where the army has established a quarantine. Seok-woo, Sang-hwa, and Yong-guk arm themselves, sneak and fight through the zombie horde to reunite with Su-an, Seong-kyeong, In-gil and the homeless man in another carriage. The remaining passengers, fearing that the survivors are infected, refuse to let them into their carriage and block the door. Seok-woo and the others start to try to get into the safe carriage, but Sang-hwa is bitten during the process. He tells Seok-woo to look after Seong-kyeong and gives her a name for their child before sacrificing his life to buy the others time to force open the door; In-gil sacrifices herself to ensure Seong-kyeong and Su-an's survival in the process.

Yon-suk, train attendant Ki-chul, and the other passengers demand that the new passengers leave their train compartment and isolate themselves in the front vestibule. Jong-gil, disgusted at everyone else's selfishness and paranoia, opens the door to let the zombies in and kill everyone else left onboard. Yon-suk and Ki-chul manage to escape by hiding in a bathroom. Seok-woo learns from a phone call that his company was indirectly responsible for the outbreak. A blocked track at Dongdaegu Station forces the train to stop and the driver disembarks to find another train. Yon-suk escapes after pushing Ki-chul into the zombies.

A flaming locomotive arrives and crashes into some of the zombie-filled passenger carriages, trapping Seok-woo, Su-an, Seong-kyeong, and the homeless man beneath a toppled carriage. Yong-guk and Jin-hee get split up from the party and are used as bait by Yon-suk, who escapes on the new train as Jin-hee is bitten by a zombie; distraught, Yong-guk allows a reanimated Jin-hee to bite him. The conductor starts up another train on a separate track and tries to help an injured Yon-suk, who throws him to the zombies to save himself. The homeless man sacrifices himself so Seok-woo, Su-an and Seong-kyeong find their way out from under the carriage.

Seok-woo, Su-an, and Seong-kyeong board the new train, only to find an infected Yon-suk, who desperately begs them for help before turning into a zombie. Seok-woo fights him off and manages to throw him off the train to his death, but in the struggle, he is bitten on the hand. In his last moments of consciousness, he puts Su-an and Seong-kyeong inside the engine room, tells Seong-kyeong how to operate the train, and says goodbye to Su-an. Just before he turns into a zombie, Seok-woo reminisces about Su-an's birth and throws himself off the train.

The surviving pair arrive at a blockade of corpses and barbed wire outside a tunnel near Busan and both walk through the tunnel. A group of soldiers mistake them for zombies, but just as they are about to shoot, Su-an sings "Aloha 'Oe" to calm her nerves and pay tribute to her father as the soldiers realize they are not zombies.

== Cast ==
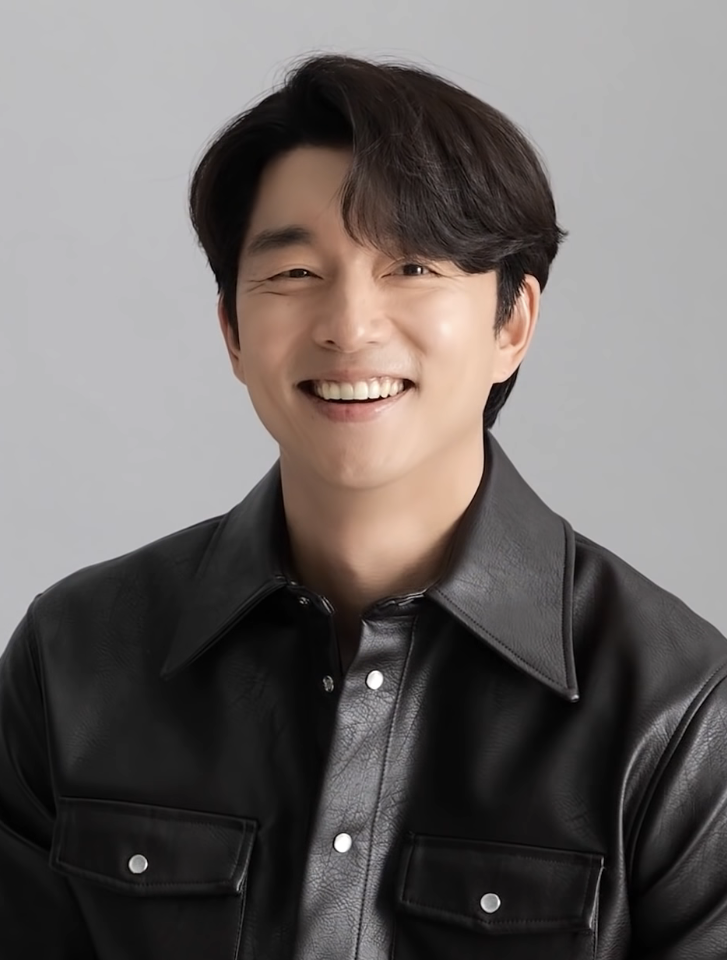
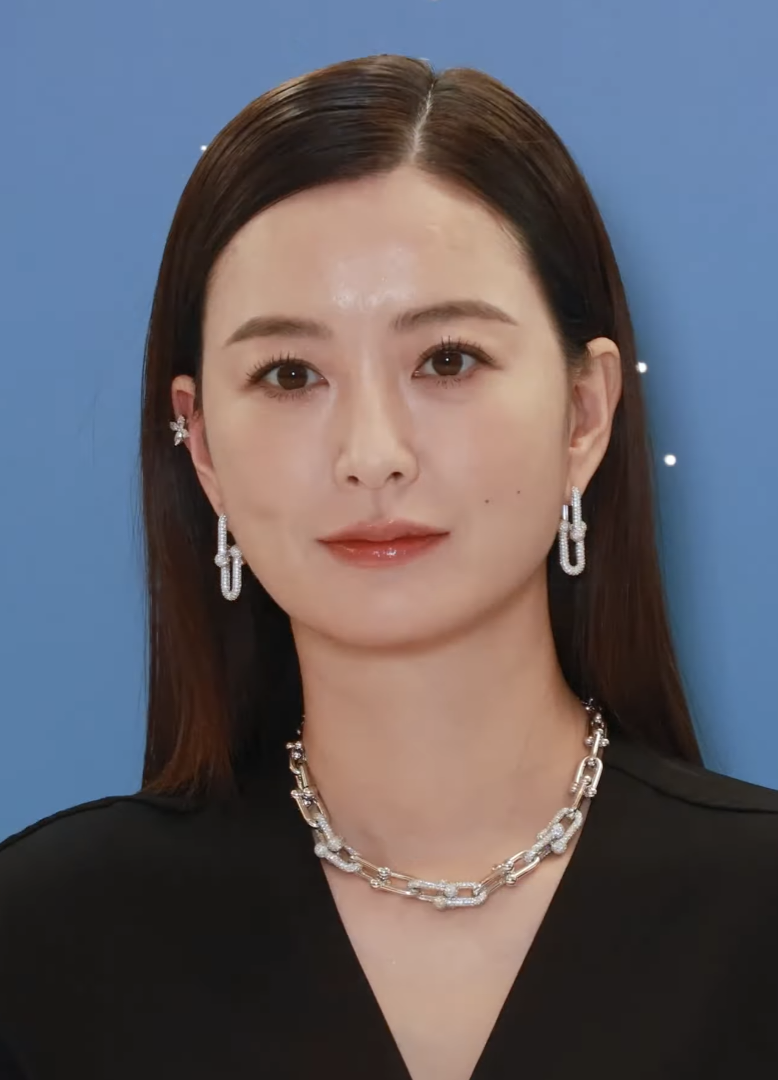
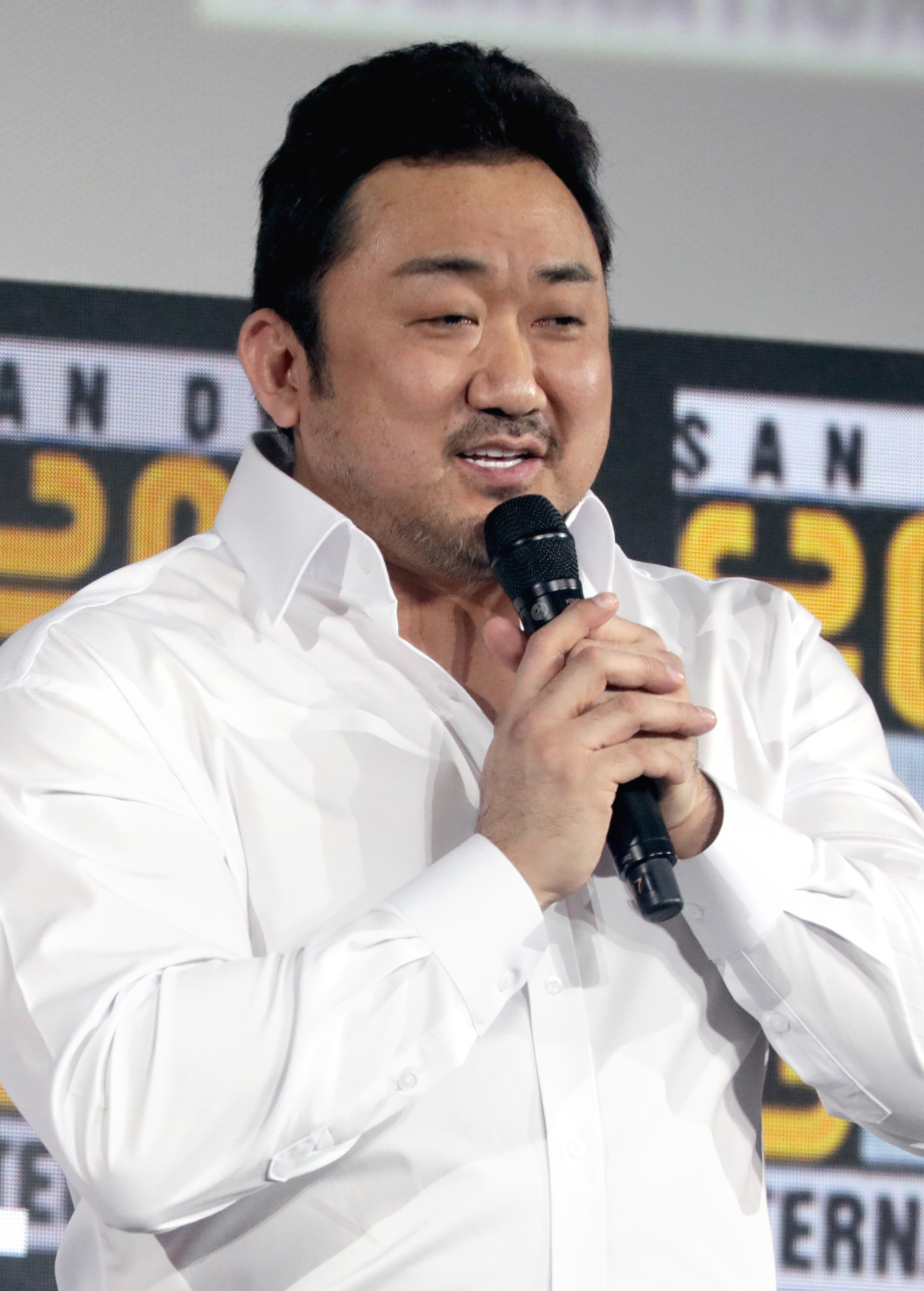
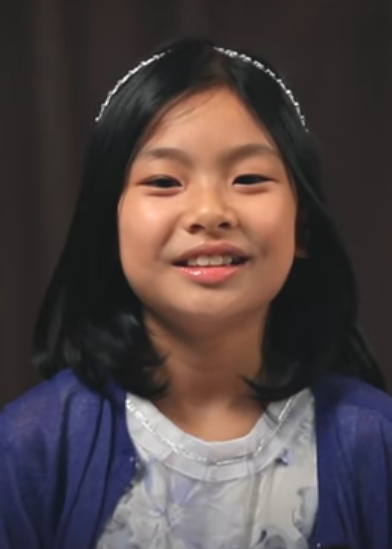
Lead actors Gong Yoo, Jung Yu-mi, Ma Dong-seok, and Kim Su-an
- Gong Yoo as Suh Seok-woo, a workaholic fund manager
- Jung Yu-mi as Seong-kyeong, Sang-hwa's pregnant wife
- Ma Dong-seok as Sang-hwa, Seong-kyeong's husband
- Kim Su-an, Suh Seok-woo's daughter
- Choi Woo-shik as Yong-guk, a high school baseball player
- Sohee as Jin-hee, Yong-guk's cheerleader girlfriend
- Kim Eui-sung as Yon-suk, a high-ranking executive
- Choi Gwi-hwa as a homeless man
- Jang Hyuk-jin as Ki-chul, a train attendant
- Park Myung-sin as Jong-gil, In-gil's younger sister
- Ye Soo-jung as In-gil, Jong-gil's older sister
- Jeong Seok-yong as the KTX driver
- Han Seong-soo as the KTX team leader
- Kim Chang-hwan as Deputy Kim Jin-mo
- Shim Eun-kyung as a bitten woman who comes onto the train
- Lee Joo-shil as Seok-woo's mother and Su-an's grandmother
- Woo Do im as Min-ji, a train attendant
- Cha Chung-hwa as a middle-aged woman
- Kim Joo-hun as a baseball coach
- Han Ji-eun as a woman wearing headphones
- Lee Joong-ok as a man in western clothes
- Kim Yool-ho as a man in a black suit

== Production ==
The film is based on an original story by Park Joo-suk. To develop the zombie movements, the production team referenced the game 7 Days to Die and the movements of the dolls from Ghost in the Shell 2: Innocence, in addition to reviewing the nurses' movements in Silent Hill. Technical Art Studio Cell handled the special effects makeup for the zombies. The team used an airbrush to draw the zombies' blood vessels, and their styling was varied depending on the stage of infection. Filming took place in various stations in Daejeon, Cheonan, and East Daegu. The deer featured in the movie was created using a combination of real footage and 3D modeling through CGI. The scenery outside the train was achieved using an LED plate rear screen technique positioned behind the set, which was based on the interior of the KTX-I. This method facilitated a greater focus on the characters and made it easier than using greenscreen.

== Release ==
Train to Busan premiered in the Midnight Screenings section of the 2016 Cannes Film Festival on May 13. It was released by Next Entertainment World on July 20 in South Korea; by August 7, it became the first Korean film of the year to break the audience record of over 10 million theatergoers, and soon surpassed 11 million.

The film had special screening in the Korean Horizons section of the 25th New York Asian Film Festival on 11 July 2026 as part of the 25th anniversary of the festival.

In 2026, Train to Busan was scheduled to be re-released in a 4K remastered version in several major countries around the world to commemorate its 10th anniversary.

== Reception ==
=== Box office ===
Train to Busan was a commercial success; on a budget of $8.5 million, it grossed $80.5 million in South Korea, $2.2 million in the United States and Canada, and $15.8 million in other territories for a total worldwide gross of $98.5 million. It became the highest-grossing Korean film in Malaysia, Hong Kong, and Singapore. In South Korea, it was the highest-grossing film of the year.

=== Critical response ===
Train to Busan received positive reviews from critics. The review aggregator Rotten Tomatoes reported that 95% of 129 critics have given the film a positive review with an average rating of 7.70/10. The website's critics consensus states: "Train to Busan delivers a thrillingly unique—and purely entertaining—take on the zombie genre, with fully realized characters and plenty of social commentary to underscore the bursts of skillfully staged action." Metacritic, which assigns a normalized rating to reviews, assigned the film an average score of 73 out of 100, based on 17 critics, indicating "generally favorable reviews".

Clark Collis of Entertainment Weekly wrote that the film "borrows heavily from World War Z in its depiction of the fast-moving undead masses while also boasting an emotional core the Brad Pitt-starring extravaganza often lacked [...] the result is first-class throughout". Jeannette Catsoulis of The New York Times selected the film as her "Critic's Pick" and noted its depiction of class warfare. Brian Tallerico of RogerEbert.com wrote, "After the near-perfect first hour of Train to Busan, the film slows its progress and makes a few stops that feel repetitive, but the journey recovers nicely for a memorable finale. You could call it Train of the Living Dead or Snowpiercer with Zombies. Whatever you call it, if it's playing in your city and you've ever been entertained by a zombie movie, it's hard to believe you wouldn't be entertained by this one."

In a more mixed review, David Ehrlich of IndieWire commented that "as the characters whittle away into archetypes (and start making senseless decisions) the spectacle also sheds its unique personality".

English filmmaker Edgar Wright applauded the film, writing on Twitter, "Best zombie movie I've seen in forever. A total crowd pleaser. Highly recommend. Go see Train To Busan."

Rotten Tomatoes placed the film at No. 2 on its list of the "100 Best Zombie Movies" as ranked by the Tomatometer. In 2025, it was ranked at No. 308 on the "Readers' Choice" edition of The New York Times' list of the "Best Movies of the 21st Century".

=== Accolades ===
Award	Date of ceremony	Category	Recipient(s)	Result	Ref(s)
Asian Film Awards	March 21, 2017	Best Actor	Gong Yoo	Nominated	
Asian Film Awards	March 21, 2017	Best Supporting Actor	Ma Dong-seok	Nominated	
Asian Film Awards	March 21, 2017	Best Editor	Yang Jin-mo	Nominated	
Asian Film Awards	March 21, 2017	Best Visual Effects	Jung Hwang-su	Nominated	
Asian Film Awards	March 21, 2017	Best Costume Designer	Kwon Yoo-jin and Rim Seung-hee	Nominated	
Blue Dragon Film Awards	November 25, 2016	Best Film	Train to Busan	Nominated	
Blue Dragon Film Awards	November 25, 2016	Best Supporting Actor	Kim Eui-sung	Nominated	
Blue Dragon Film Awards	November 25, 2016	Best Supporting Actor	Ma Dong-seok	Nominated	
Blue Dragon Film Awards	November 25, 2016	Best Supporting Actress	Jung Yu-mi	Nominated	
Blue Dragon Film Awards	November 25, 2016	Best New Director	Yeon Sang-ho	Nominated	
Blue Dragon Film Awards	November 25, 2016	Best Art Direction	Lee Mok-won	Nominated	
Blue Dragon Film Awards	November 25, 2016	Best Screenplay	Park Joo-seok	Nominated	
Blue Dragon Film Awards	November 25, 2016	Best Editing	Yang Jin-mo	Nominated	
Blue Dragon Film Awards	November 25, 2016	Best Cinematography	Lee Hyeong-deok	Nominated	
Blue Dragon Film Awards	November 25, 2016	Best Lighting	Park Jeong-woo	Nominated	
Blue Dragon Film Awards	November 25, 2016	Technical Award	Kwak Tae-yong and Hwang Hyo-gyoon (special make-up)	Won	
Blue Dragon Film Awards	November 25, 2016	Audience Choice Award for Most Popular Film	Train to Busan	Won	
Buil Film Awards	October 7, 2016	Best Film	Train to Busan	Nominated	
Buil Film Awards	October 7, 2016	Best Supporting Actor	Kim Eui-sung	Won	
Buil Film Awards	October 7, 2016	Best Supporting Actress	Jung Yu-mi	Nominated	
Buil Film Awards	October 7, 2016	Best Cinematography	Lee Hyeong-deok	Nominated	
Buil Film Awards	October 7, 2016	Best Art Direction	Lee Mok-won	Nominated	
Buil Film Awards	October 7, 2016	Yu Hyun-mok Film Arts Award	Yeon Sang-ho	Won	
Fangoria Chainsaw Awards	N/A	Best Foreign-Language Film	Train to Busan	Won	
Fangoria Chainsaw Awards	N/A	Best Actor	Gong Yoo	Nominated	
Korean Association of Film Critics Awards	November, 24, 2016	Technical Award	Train to Busan	Won	
Saturn Awards	June 28, 2017	Best Horror Film	Train to Busan		
Baeksang Arts Awards	May 3, 2017	Best Film	Train to Busan		
Baeksang Arts Awards	May 3, 2017	Best Supporting Actor	Kim Eui-sung		Won
Baeksang Arts Awards	May 3, 2017	Best Supporting Actor	Ma Dong-seok		Nominated
Baeksang Arts Awards	May 3, 2017	Best New Director	Yeon Sang-ho		Won
Chunsa Film Awards	May 24, 2017	Technical Award	Kwak Tae-yong	Won	
Chunsa Film Awards	May 24, 2017	Special Audience Award for Best Film	Train to Busan	Won	

== Home media ==
American distributor Well Go USA released DVD and Blu-ray versions of Train to Busan on 17 January 2017. FNC Add Culture released the Korean DVD and Blu-ray versions on 22 February 2017. It is also available on Rakuten Viki and Amazon Prime Video streaming. The Indian version is a minute shorter than the original version due to a few violent zombie shots being censored.

In the United Kingdom, it was 2017's fourth best-selling foreign language film on home video (below Operation Chromite, Your Name, and Guardians). It was later 2020's sixth best-selling foreign language film in the UK, and third best-selling Korean film (below Parasite and Train to Busan Presents: Peninsula).

== Follow-ups ==
=== Prequel ===
An animated prequel, Seoul Station, also directed by Yeon, was released on August 18, 2016. Shim Eun-kyung, who played as the runaway girl that triggered the spread of the virus inside the train, appeared as a voice actress for the main character Hye-sun.

=== Sequel ===
Peninsula, a standalone sequel set four years after Train to Busan and also directed by Yeon, was released in South Korea on July 15, 2020 to mixed reviews. Yeon has stated that,

Peninsula is not a sequel to Train to Busan because it's not a continuation of the story, but it happens in the same universe.

=== Spin-off ===
In 2016, Gaumont acquired the rights for the English-language remake of the film from Next Entertainment World. In 2018, New Line Cinema, Atomic Monster and Coin Operated were announced to be the co-producing partners for the remake, with Warner Bros. Pictures distributing worldwide, except for France and South Korea. Indonesian director Timo Tjahjanto is in talks to helm the film, while Gary Dauberman adapts the screenplay and co-produces the film alongside James Wan. In December 2021, the film's official title was revealed to be The Last Train to New York, scheduled to be released on April 21, 2023. However, in July 2022, Warner Bros. removed the film from the release schedule with Evil Dead Rise, another New Line Cinema film, taking its original release date.

On June 26, 2025, James Wan told Entertainment Weekly that the film was a passion project for them and confirmed that the Last Train to New York would not be a remake but more of a spin-off and he also add that the film would be set at the same time as the original film.

== See also ==
- Snowpiercer: Post-apocalyptic South Korean action movie set on a train
- Trip Ubusan: The Lolas vs. Zombies: Filipino comedy movie whose name is inspired by this film's
