= Peninsula (film) =

2020 film directed by Yeon Sang-ho

- Theatrical release poster
- Hangul: 반도
- RR: Bando
- MR: Pando
- Directed by: Yeon Sang-ho
- Written by: Yeon Sang-ho; Ryu Yong-jae
- Produced by: Lee Dong-ha
- Starring: Gang Dong-won; Lee Jung-hyun; Kwon Hae-hyo; Kim Min-jae; Koo Kyo-hwan; Kim Do-yoon; Lee Re
- Cinematography: Lee Hyung-deok
- Edited by: Yang Jin-mo
- Music by: Mowg
- Production companies: RedPeter Films; Contents Panda
- Distributed by: Next Entertainment World
- Release date: July 15, 2020
- Running time: 116 minutes
- Country: South Korea
- Languages: Korean; English; Cantonese
- Budget: $16 million
- Box office: $42.7 million

Peninsula (Korean: 반도; Hanja: 半島; RR: Bando; marketed internationally as Train to Busan Presents: Peninsula) is a 2020 South Korean post-apocalyptic horror action film co-written and directed by Yeon Sang-ho. It is a standalone sequel to the 2016 film Train to Busan, the second live-action feature film and the third overall installment in the Train to Busan film series. The story follows a former soldier tasked with retrieving a truck full of money from the wastelands of South Korea, now inhabited by zombies, rogue militia, and survivors. The film stars an ensemble cast featuring Gang Dong-won and Lee Jung-hyun.

Peninsula was chosen to premiere in the 2020 Cannes Film Festival, which was cancelled due to the COVID-19 pandemic. The film was instead released theatrically in South Korea on 15 July 2020, while also being shown at the 25th Busan International Film Festival on 21 October 2020. It grossed $42.7 million worldwide on a $16 million budget but received generally mixed reviews from critics, who found it inferior to the first film.

== Plot ==
A zombie outbreak overwhelms South Korea, (Note: As depicted in Train to Busan) prompting international evacuations before the peninsula is quarantined in Busan. ROKMC officer Jung-seok flees aboard an evacuation ship with his sister, her husband Chul-min, and their young son Dong-hwan. He refuses to help a distressed family after noticing the father is bleeding. An infected passenger soon turns into a zombie and bites several people, including Dong-hwan. Jung-seok's sister remains behind with her son and is bitten; Jung-seok seals the cabin, preventing Chul-min from reaching them as soldiers intervene.

Four years later in Hong Kong, Jung-seok, Chul-min, and two other Korean refugees are recruited by Chinese mobsters to return to South Korea and retrieve a truck containing US$20 million, in exchange for half the money. They locate the truck at night and kill its zombie driver, but the noise attracts a horde. While escaping towards Incheon Port, they are ambushed by a rogue militia squad from Unit 631, led by Sergeant Hwang. Their vehicles crash, killing one team member; Hwang kills another. Chul-min hides in the truck while Jung-seok flees and is rescued by sisters Joon-yi and Yu-jin. They take him to their hideout, where they live with their mother Min-jung and grandfather Elder Kim, who believes his military friend Jane will respond to his radio transmission. Jung-seok realises that Min-jung and Yu-jin are the mother and daughter he refused to help four years earlier.

Unit 631 takes the truck to its base, unaware of the money inside, and forces Chul-min into a survival game against zombies. Private Kim discovers the money and informs Captain Seo, who secretly contacts the mobsters and plans to escape the peninsula alone. Jung-seok tells Min-jung that an extraction ship awaits at Incheon, prompting her to devise a plan to steal the truck and escape with her family and Jung-seok.

That night, Jung-seok and Min-jung infiltrate the militia base. After learning from Private Kim that Chul-min is alive, Jung-seok interrupts the survival game to rescue him. Chul-min saves Jung-seok from a zombie bite but is shot dead by Hwang. Min-jung escapes with Jung-seok in the truck, but a zombie horde blocks their route. Joon-yi, Yu-jin, and Elder Kim arrive and distract the zombies with their car, enabling both vehicles to escape. Hwang and Unit 631 pursue them, but their vehicles are destroyed and Hwang is killed by zombies.

At Incheon Port, Seo kills Private Kim, ambushes the family, and takes Joon-yi hostage. Yu-jin distracts him, allowing Joon-yi to escape, but Elder Kim is fatally shot and Min-jung is wounded. Seo reaches the extraction ship with the truck, only for the mobsters to betray and shoot him. Before dying, he reverses the truck into the cargo ramp, allowing zombies to overrun the ship and kill everyone aboard.

Jung-seok and the family signal a passing U.N. Chinook, which responds to Elder Kim's radio transmission. Min-jung stays behind to hold off the zombies while Jung-seok and her daughters reach the helicopter, intending to shoot herself afterwards. Remembering Chul-min's regret over failing to protect his family, Jung-seok returns for her and kills the pursuing zombies. Min-jung escapes, and the family safely boards the helicopter and evacuates the peninsula. The rescuing soldier's name tag shows "Jane", meaning elder Kim wasn't hallucinating or fabricating his story about the UN rescue.

== Cast ==
- Gang Dong-won as Han Jung-seok, a former South Korean Marine Corps Captain who suffers from guilt as a result of his nephew and sister's deaths.
- Lee Jung-hyun as Min-jung, a mysterious lady who had run into Jung-seok four years back while attempting to get out of Korea.
- Kwon Hae-hyo as Elder Kim Noh-in, Min-jung's father and grandfather of Joon-yi and Yu-jin.
- Kim Min-jae as Sergeant Hwang, the sadistic former sergeant of Unit 631 and co-manager of an underground fight club.
- Koo Kyo-hwan as Captain Seo, the captain of Unit 631 and the cynical head of an underground fight club, who went insane years after the virus ravaged Korea.
- Kim Do-yoon as Chul-min, Jung-seok's brother-in-law and a member of his team.
- Lee Re as Joon-yi, Min-jung's eldest daughter who drives an armored car to help survivors.
- Lee Ye-won as Yu-jin, Min-jung's youngest daughter who uses loud toy vehicles to draw out zombies and kill them.
- Jang So-yeon as Jung-seok's older sister
- Moon Woo-jin as Dong-hwan, Jung-seok's nephew who was infected four years back.
- Kim Kyu-baek as Private Kim, the private of Unit 631 and the vice leader of the underground fight club, and Seo's right-hand man.
- Bella Rahim as Major Jane, a Malaysian UN soldier

== Release ==
Peninsula was selected to be shown at the 2020 Cannes Film Festival as part of the Official Selection. However, the festival was eventually cancelled due to the ongoing COVID-19 pandemic. It was theatrically released in South Korea on 15 July 2020, and was also shown in the Panorama section of the 25th Busan International Film Festival on 21 October 2020.

The film was initially set to release in theaters in the United States on 21 August 2020, but moved to streaming via Shudder and released on 1 April 2021 as "a Shudder exclusive". It was released in India on 27 November 2020.

The film had special screening in the Korean Horizons section of the 25th New York Asian Film Festival on 25 July 2026 as part of the 25th anniversary of the festival.

=== Home media ===
In the United Kingdom, it was 2020's fourth best-selling foreign language film on physical home video formats (below Parasite, Weathering with You, and Mulan: Legendary Warrior).

== Reception ==
=== Box office ===
Peninsula grossed $1.2 million in the United States and Canada, and $41.5 million in other territories (including $28.7 million from South Korea), for a worldwide total of $42.7 million.

In South Korea, the film made $2.4 million from 2,338 screens on its opening day, the best total of 2020, and $4 million through its first two days of release. It also opened in Taiwan and Singapore, making a combined $905,000 on its first day. The film went on to debut to $13.2 million over its first five days in South Korea, and a total $20.8 million (including $750,000 from 45 IMAX screens) worldwide. It was the first time since mid-March that the global box office totaled over $1 million. After ten days of release, the film had totaled $19.3 million in South Korea. In its second weekend the film also made another $265,000 from 51 IMAX screens in six countries, becoming the highest grossing local-language title ever for IMAX in Singapore, Malaysia, and Vietnam with $1 million. By August 7, the film had grossed nearly $27 million in South Korea. The film made around $100,000 from 47 theaters from its Canadian debut, and $213,415 from 151 theaters the following weekend from its United States opening.

=== Critical response ===
On review aggregator Rotten Tomatoes, the film holds an approval rating of 55% with an average rating of 5.9/10, based on 131 reviews. The website's critics consensus reads: "Although a disappointing sense of familiarity threatens to derail Train to Busan Presents: Peninsula, fans of the original may find it a thrilling enough ride." On Metacritic, the film has a weighted average score of 51 out of 100, based on 23 critics, indicating "mixed or average reviews".

Rob Hunter of Film School Rejects said the "film forgoes much of what makes Train to Busan so intensely affecting in favor of a somewhat more generic setting" but said "it's a fantastic idea blending a zombie movie with a heist film, and Yeon has fun with the concept."

Rotten Tomatoes lists the film on its 100 Best Zombie Movies, Ranked by Tomatometer.

=== Accolades ===
Year	Award	Category	Recipient(s)	Result	Ref.
2021	26th Chunsa Film Art Awards	Best Director	Yeon Sang-ho	Nominated	
2021	26th Chunsa Film Art Awards	Best Supporting Actor	Koo Kyo-hwan	Nominated	
2021	26th Chunsa Film Art Awards	Best Supporting Actress	Lee Re	Nominated	
2021	26th Chunsa Film Art Awards	Best New Actor	Kim Do-yoon	Nominated	
2021	26th Chunsa Film Art Awards	Best Technical Award	Lee Mok-won, Yoo Chung, Park Joon-young (Production design)	Won	

== Sequel ==
In August 2020, Yeon Sang-ho confirmed plans to continue the film series with various films set within the same Train to Busan universe, while announcing development on another film had begun. Sang-ho stated that though he may not direct the film, he is involved with the project. In November 2021, the filmmaker stated that after considering expanding the film series into a franchise with a potential television series, film industry conditions on Korea made him decide on making another film. Sang-ho elaborated that work on the third film is ongoing while stating that the plot will be restricted to a confined space more similar to the first film, as opposed to the action-packed sequences of the second movie.
