= Kim Su-an =

South Korean actress (born 2006)

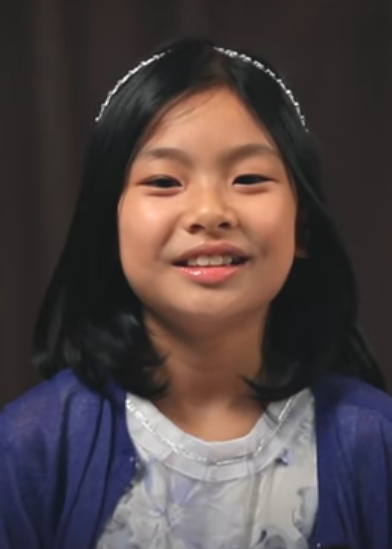
- Kim in May 2016
- Born: January 27, 2006 (age 20); Seoul, South Korea
- Occupation: Actress
- Years active: 2011–present
- Agent: Blossom Entertainment

Korean name
- Hangul: 김수안
- Hanja: 金秀安
- RR: Gim Suan
- MR: Kim Suan

Kim Su-an (Korean: 김수안; born January 27, 2006) is a South Korean actress. She had her first film role when she was five years old, and has since starred in several films and television series. She is best known internationally for her role in Train to Busan (2016).

== Career ==
=== 2011–2015: Beginnings ===
Kim debuted as an actress in the film Sorry, Thanks in 2011. Since then, she has become an in-demand child actress in both independent and big-budget films like Sprout (2013) Mad Sad Bad (2014) and Coin Locker Girl (2015).

=== 2016–present: Rising popularity ===
In 2016, she gained wider recognition for playing the daughter of Gong Yoo's character in the box-office zombie hit Train to Busan. The same year, she signed an exclusive contract with talent management agency Blossom Entertainment.

In 2017, she starred in the action film The Battleship Island, playing Hwang Jung-min's daughter. She was awarded the Best Supporting Actress award at the Buil Film Awards. She also appeared in Along with the Gods: The Two Worlds (2017).

== Filmography ==
=== Film ===
Year	Title	Role	Notes
2011	Sorry, Thanks	Bo-eun	Segment: "My Younger Brother"
2011	A Reason to Live	Church kid	
2013	Hide and Seek	Baek Soo-ah	
2013	Sprout	Bo-ri	
2014	Mad Sad Bad	Soo-min	Segment: "Picnic"
2014	Gyeongju	Little kid	
2014	Whistle Blower	Shim Soo-bin	
2014	Cart	Min-yeong	
2014	Late Spring	Song-i	
2014	Twinkle-Twinkle Pitter-Patter	Onew	Short film
2015	Coin Locker Girl	Young Il-yeong	
2015	Memories of the Sword	Goo-seul	
2015	The Exclusive: Beat the Devil's Tattoo	Little kid	
2016	Love, Lies	Young So-yool	
2016	Kid, Tickling	Kid	Short film
2016	Horror Stories 3	Girl	Segment: "A Girl from Mars"
2016	Sports Day	Seung-hee	
2016	Train to Busan	Su-an	
2016	The Net	North Korean flower girl	
2016	Moonlight Palace	Hyeon Joo-ri	Voice only
2017	Along with the Gods: The Two Worlds	Great King Taesan	
2017	The Mayor	Yoon-hak	
2017	The Battleship Island	Lee So-hee	
2017	The Mimic	Soon-ja's older sister (voice)	Special appearance
2019	A Little Princess	Gong-joo	
2024	Project Silence	Cha Kyeong-min	

=== Television series ===
Year	Title	Role	Notes	Ref.
2015–2016	Mom	Ha-na		
2021	Reflection of You	Ahn Li-sa		
2022	Poong, the Joseon Psychiatrist	Ip-bun		
2025	When Life Gives You Tangerines	Oh Jenny	Cameo (episode 7,8)	

=== Web series ===
Year	Title	Role	Ref.
2016	The Cravings - Temple Stay		

== Accolades ==
=== Awards and nominations ===
Year	Award	Category	Nominated work	Result	Ref.
2014	Busan International Short Film Festival	Acting Award	Sprout	Won	
2014	Great Short Film Festival	Great Actress Award	Sprout	Won	
2015	2nd Wildflower Film Awards	Best New Actress	Mad Sad Bad	Won	
2016	BloodGuts UK Horror Awards	Best Actress in an International Film	Train to Busan	Nominated	
2017	1st The Seoul Awards	Special Acting Award – Film	The Battleship Island	Won	
2017	38th Blue Dragon Film Awards	Popular Star Award	The Battleship Island	Won	
2017	6th Korean Film Actor's Association Awards	Star Night Awards: Popular Star	The Battleship Island	Won	
2017	26th Buil Film Awards	Best Supporting Actress	The Battleship Island	Won	
2018	23rd Chunsa Film Art Awards	Best Supporting Actress	The Battleship Island	Nominated	
2018	Brand of the Year Awards	Young Actress of the Year	The Battleship Island	Won	

=== Listicles ===
Name of publisher, year listed, name of listicle, and placement
Publisher	Year	Listicle	Placement	Ref.
Korean Film Council	2021	Korean Actors 200 (Note: Introduces 200 actors that best represent the present and future of Korean cinema to the people in the film industry all over the world.)	Included	
