= Next Entertainment World =

South Korean media content production and distribution company

- Native name: 넥스트엔터테인먼트월드
- Type: Joint-stock
- Traded as: KRX: 160550
- Industry: Entertainment; Mass media; Production
- Founded: June 25, 2008 (as Domeo Holdings)
- Headquarters: 5, Hakdong-ro 9-gil, Gangnam-gu, Seoul, South Korea
- Area served: South Korea
- Key people: Kim Woo-taek (Chairman)
- Subsidiaries: Movie&NEW; Music&NEW; Studio&NEW; Bravo&NEW; Cine Q Contents Panda eNgine; NEW ID; NEW Point
- Website: its-new.co.kr

Next Entertainment World (Korean: 넥스트엔터테인먼트월드, Acronym: NEW) is a South Korean media content production and distribution company. The film investment and distribution business was founded in 2008 by former Showbox president Kim Woo-taek. Seo Dong-wook and Jang Kyung-ik are the founding members of NEW.

NEW has since evolved into a comprehensive entertainment company with subsidiaries venturing into other industries including music, sports, production, management, international distribution, and cinema.

== History ==
Domeo Holdings was the name of the holding company established in 2008. In 2012, it changed its name after a merger through absorption with the wholly owned subsidiary Next Entertainment World.

The music distribution corporation Music&NEW was established in 2012.

In 2013, it surpassed CJ E&M and ranked first in terms of audience with the success of Miracle in Cell No. 7 (12.81 million viewers), Hide and Seek (5.6 million viewers), and New World (4.68 million viewers).

In 2013, global distribution corporation Contents Panda was established.

In 2014, Huace Media Group invested $52.7 million, and NEW was listed on KOSDAQ. Huace Media Group was listed on the KOSDAQ market with a 15% stake in NEW and Chairman Kim Woo-taek with a 45% stake. In 2015, NEW set up sports corporation Bravo&NEW and Korea-China joint venture Huace&NEW.

2016 marked the establishment of contents production corporation Studio&NEW.

The Cine Q movie theater branch opened in 2017. CINEQ opened its first branch in Gyeongju and its second branch in Gumi in 2017 and its Sindorim branch in Seoul in 2018.

In 2017, the subsidiary Music & New Co., Ltd. acquired shares of Windmill Ent Co., Ltd. in order to expand its business area into music and music distribution, and in June 2018, through a small-scale and simple merger, Music & New Co., Ltd. absorb Windmill ENT and merged.

In 2019, NEW established VFX company eNgine and digital contents business NEW ID.

In 2025, after selling its majority stake in eNgine, NEW spun off the remaining non-visual effects side of it into a new company named NEW Point, which became the parent company's second production subsidiary after Studio&NEW.

== Business ==
=== Movie&NEW ===
Movie&NEW (stylized in all caps) is NEW's film investment, distribution, marketing, and public relations division. Notable distributed works include Miracle in Cell No. 7, The Attorney, Train to Busan, The Villainess, and Peninsula.

In March 2021, NEW's film division signed a three-year contract with Hollywood investment company Library Pictures International.

=== Music&NEW ===
Music&NEW (stylized in all caps) is the music production, management, and distribution business.

=== Studio&NEW ===
Studio&NEW (stylized in all caps) is a film and drama media content production company that has also expanded to management. Notable productions include the 2016 premiere project Descendants of the Sun and The Great Battle. The studio has attracted more than ₩56 billion (USD$47 million) in investment within five years of establishment.

In April 2021, Studio&NEW signed a five-year contract with OTT streaming service Disney+ with a commitment of supplying at least one project per year. Local media named Moving, a live adaptation of Kang Full's webtoon, and Star original series Rookie Cops as shows that are in the works.

=== NEW Point ===
NEW Point - which was the result of NEW spinning off the non-visual effects businesses of its now-minority owned affiliate (formerly wholely-owned subsidiary) eNgine - is the parent company's second production subsidiary focusing on adaptation of intellectual property such as webtoons, novels, and games into global projects.

Its debut production is the Netflix original series Take Charge of My Heart, based on the Naver webtoon of the same name by Hae Beon and co-produced by WhyNot Media. It will premiere on October 9, 2026.

=== Others ===
==== Current ====
- Cine Q is NEW's movie theater brand.
- Contents Panda handles global copyright distribution and has distributed more than 660 works. Efforts are being made to sign overseas remakes.
- NEW ID is the digital content or platform subsidiary. It has partnered with global content platforms such as Samsung Electronics, LG Electronics, Vizio, Amazon, and Roku to launch digital broadcasting channels. It has also partnered with major broadcasters such as MBC Plus, KBS World, SBS Contents Hub, YG Entertainment, Starship Entertainment, and SK Telecom to provide solutions to export Korean wave content.
- eNgine provides visual effects services and has signed business agreements with 3D graphics companies Wysiwyg Studios and Vive Studios. As of 2025, its status was changed from wholely-owned subsidiary to minority-owned affiliate within NEW, with its non-visual effects business units spun off as NEW Point.

==== Former ====
- Bravo&NEW focuses on sports broadcasting rights distribution, athlete management, and event planning. In 2022, NEW sold it to Fidelity Management Group, a holding company formed two years ago by some ex-Bravo&NEW employees, and subsequently merged into FMG's subsidiary Wow Management.

== Filmography ==
=== Film ===
Feature film
Year	Title		Director	Production House	Ref.
Year	English	Original	Director	Production House	Ref.
2008	Cyborg She	僕の彼女はサイボーグ	Kwak Jae-yong		
2009	A Season of Good Rain	호우시절	Hur Jin-ho	Pancinema; Zonbo Media	
2010	Poetry	시	Kim Ki-duk	Pine House Film; UniKorea Pictures; Diaphana Films; Finecut	
2010	Death Bell 2: Bloody Camp	고死 두번째 이야기 : 교생실습	Yoo Sun-dong	Core Content Media	
2010	Haunters	초능력자	Kim Min-seok	Zip Cinema	
2010	Late Blossom	그대를 사랑합니다	Choo Chang-min	St. Paul Cinema Co., Ltd.; Your Ambassador Entertainment	
2010	Hello Ghost	헬로우 고스트	Kim Young-tak	Water and Tree	
2010	The Trouble-solving Broker	해결사	Kwon Hyuk-jae	Filmmaker R&K	
2011	Poongsan	풍산개	Juhn Jai-hong	Kim Ki Duk Films	
2011	Blind	블라인드	Ahn Sang-hoon	Moon Watcher	
2011	Marrying the Mafia IV	가문의 영광4 - 가문의 수난	Jung Tae-won	Taewon Entertainment	
2011	Unbowed	부러진 화살	Chung Ji-young	Aura Pictures	
2011	Come Rain, Come Shine	사랑한다, 사랑하지 않는다	Lee Yoon-ki	Yeonghwasa Bom Co., Ltd.	
2011	The Cat	고양이: 죽음을보는 두개의눈	Byun Seung-wook	Pinehouse Film	
2012	Dangerously Excited	나는 공무원이다	Koo Ja-hong	Mapo Film	
2012	Miss Conspirator	미쓰 GO	Park Chul-kwan		
2012	The Grand Heist	바람과 함께 사라지다	Kim Joo-ho	AD406 and DHUTA	
2012	Pietà	피에타	Kim Ki-duk	Kim Ki-duk Film	
2012	Ghost Sweepers	점쟁이들	Shin Jung-won		
2012	Love Fiction	러브 픽션	Jeon Kye-soo		
2012	All About My Wife	내 아내의 모든 것	Min Kyu-dong		
2012	Love 911	반창꼬	Jeong Gi-hun		
2013	The Attorney	변호인	Yang Woo-suk	withUs Film	
2013	Cold Eyes	감시자들	Cho Ui-seok; Kim Byeong-seo	Zip Cinema	
2013	Miracle in Cell No. 7	7번방의 선물	Lee Hwan-kyung	Fineworks; CL Entertainment	
2013	New World	신세계	Park Hoon-jung	Man Pictures; Peppermint & Company	
2013	The Fake	사이비	Yeon Sang-ho	Studio Dada Show	
2013	Montage	몽타주	Jeong Keun-seob	Finecut	
2013	Hide and Seek	숨바꼭질	Huh Jung	Studio Dream Capture	
2014	Sea Fog	해무	Shim Sung-bo		
2014	For the Emperor	황제를 위하여	Huh Jung		
2014	Fashion King	패션왕	Oh Ki-hwan		
2014	Man in Love	남자가 사랑할 때	Park Sang-jun		
2015	Twenty	스물	Lee Byeong-heon		
2015	Chronicle of a Blood Merchant	허삼관	Ha Jung-woo		
2015	The Phone	더 폰	Kim Bong-ju		
2015	Northern Limit Line	연평해전	Kim Hak-soon		
2015	The Beauty Inside	뷰티 인사이드	Baik	Yong Film	
2015	You Call It Passion	열정 같은 소리 하고 있네	Jeong Gi-hun	Banzakbanzak Film	
2015	The Tiger	대호	Park Hoon-jung	Man Pictures	
2016	Train to Busan	부산행	Yeon Sang-ho	Next Entertainment World; RedPeter Film	
2016	Seoul Station	서울역	Yeon Sang-ho	Next Entertainment World; Studio Dadashow	
2016	Pandora	판도라	Park Jung-woo	CAC Entertainment	
2017	Because I Love You	사랑하기 때문에	Joo Ji-hoong	AD406 Pictures	
2017	The Mimic	장산범	Huh Jung	Studio Dream Capture	
2017	The King	더킹	Han Jae-rim	WooJoo Film	
2017	Lucid Dream	루시드 드림	Kim Joon-sung	Rod Pictures	
2017	One Line	원라인	Yang Kyung-mo	MiiN Pictures	
2017	What a Man Wants	바람 바람 바람	Lee Byeong-heon	Hive Mediacorp	
2017	The Villainess	악녀	Jung Byung-gil	Independent Filmmakers Group BFG	
2017	Steel Rain	강철비	Yang Woo-suk	Mofac & Alfred	
2018	Psychokinesis	염력	Yeon Sang-ho	Redpeter Film	
2018	Herstory	허스토리	Min Kyu-dong	Soo Film	
2018	Believer	독전	Baik	Yong Film	
2018	The Great Battle	안시성	Kim Kwang-sik	Soojak Film; Studio&NEW	
2018	Rampant	창궐	Kim Sung-hoon	Leeyang Film; Rear Window; VAST Entertainment & Media	
2019	Homme Fatale	기방도령	Nam Dae-joong		
2019	Birthday	생일	Lee Jong-un	Nowfilm; Pinehouse Film; Redpeter Films	
2019	Inseparable Bros	나의 특별한 형제	Yook Sang-hyo	Myung Films; Joy Rabbit	
2019	Cheer Up, Mr. Lee	힘을 내요, 미스터 리	Lee Gae-byok	Yong Film	
2019	Start-Up	시동	Choi Jung-yeol	Filmmaker R&K	
2020	Honest Candidate	정직한 후보	Jang Yu-jeong	Hong Film; Soo Film	
2020	Peninsula	반도	Yeon Sang-ho	RedPeter Films; Contents Panda	
2020	Night in Paradise	낙원의 밤	Park Hoon-jung	Sageumwol Film (Goldmoon Film); Studio&NEW	
2020	The Call	콜	Lee Chung-hyun	Yong Film	
2021	Hostage: Missing Celebrity	인질	Pil Kam-sung	Secret Warrior; Filmmaker R&K	
2021	Perhaps Love	장르만 로맨스	Jo Eun-ji	Bleaf Co., Ltd.; Library Pictures International	
2022	Special Delivery	특송	Park Dae-min	M Pictures Co., Ltd	
2022	The Witch: Part 2. The Other One	마녀 2: the other one	Park Hoon-jung	Sageumwol Film (Goldmoon Film); Studio&NEW	
2022	Honest Candidate 2	정직한 후보 2	Jang Yu-jeong	Hong Film; Soo Film	
2022	The Night Owl	올빼미	Ahn Tae-jin	C-JeS Entertainment; Cinema DahmDahm	
2023	Soulmate	소울메이트	Min Yong-geun	Climax Studio; Andmarq Studio; Studio&NEW; KeyEast	
2023	Long D	롱디	Lim Jae-wan	Twelve Journey; Baselevs; Universal Use; Gramercy	
2023	The Childe	귀공자	Park Hoon-jung	Sageumwol Film (Goldmoon Film); Studio&NEW	
2023	Smugglers	밀수	Ryoo Seung-wan	Filmmaker R&K	
2023	Marrying the Mafia: Returns	가문의 영광:리턴즈	Jeong Yong-gi; Jeong Tae-won	Taewon Entertainment Co., Ltd.	
2025	My Daughter Is a Zombie	좀비딸	Pil Kam-sung	Studio N	
2026	Humint	휴민트	Ryoo Seung-wan	Filmmaker R&K	

=== Television series ===
==== Studio&NEW ====
Television drama credits
Year	Title		Network	Director	Production house	Ref.
Year	English	Korean	Network	Director	Production house	Ref.
2016	Descendants of the Sun	태양의 후예	KBS2	Lee Eung-bok; Baek Sang-hoon	Barunson; Next Entertainment World	
2018	Ms. Hammurabi	미스 함무라비	JTBC	Kwak Jung-hwan	Studio&NEW	
2018	The Beauty Inside	뷰티 인사이드	JTBC	Song Hyun-wook	Studio&NEW; Yong Film	
2019	Chief of Staff	보좌관	JTBC	Kwak Jung-hwan	Studio&NEW	
2020	Oh My Baby	오 마이 베이비	tvN	Nam Ki-hoon	Studio&NEW; Studio Dragon	
2020	Graceful Friends	우아한 친구들	JTBC	Song Hyun-wook	Studio&NEW; SLL; JCN	
2020–2021	Delayed Justice	날아라 개천용	SBS TV	Kwak Jung-hwan	Studio&NEW	
2021	Doom at Your Service	어느 날 우리 집 현관으로 멸망이 들어왔다	tvN	Kwon Young-il	Studio&NEW; Studio Dragon	
2021	The Devil Judge	악마판사	tvN	Choi Jung-kyu	Studio&NEW; Studio Dragon	
2022	Rookie Cops	너와 나의 경찰수업	Disney+	Kim Byung-soo	Studio&NEW; The Walt Disney Company (Korea)	
2023	Doctor Cha	닥터 차정숙	JTBC	Kim Dae-jin; Kim Jung-wook	Studio&NEW; SLL; JCN	
2023	Moving	무빙	Disney+	Park In-je	Studio&NEW; Mr. Romance; The Walt Disney Company (Korea)	
2023–2024	Tell Me That You Love Me	사랑한다고 말해줘	ENA	Kim Yoon-jin	Studio&NEW; Artist Studio	
2024	Good Partner	굿파트너	SBS TV	Kim Ga-ram	Studio S; Studio&NEW	
2024	The Tyrant	폭군	Disney+	Park Hoon-jung	Goldmoon; Studio&NEW	
2025	Good Boy	굿보이	JTBC	Shim Na-yeon	SLL; Drama House Studio	
2025	Nice to Not Meet You	알미운 사랑	tvN	Kim Ga-ram	Studio Dragon; Studio&NEW; Artist Company	

==== NEW Point ====
Television drama credits
Year	Title		Network	Director	Production house	Ref.
Year	English	Korean	Network	Director	Production house	Ref.
2026	Take Charge of My Heart	나를 충전해줘	Netflix	Park Soo-won	NEW Point; WhyNot Media	
