= Jo Aram =

South Korean actress (born 2000)

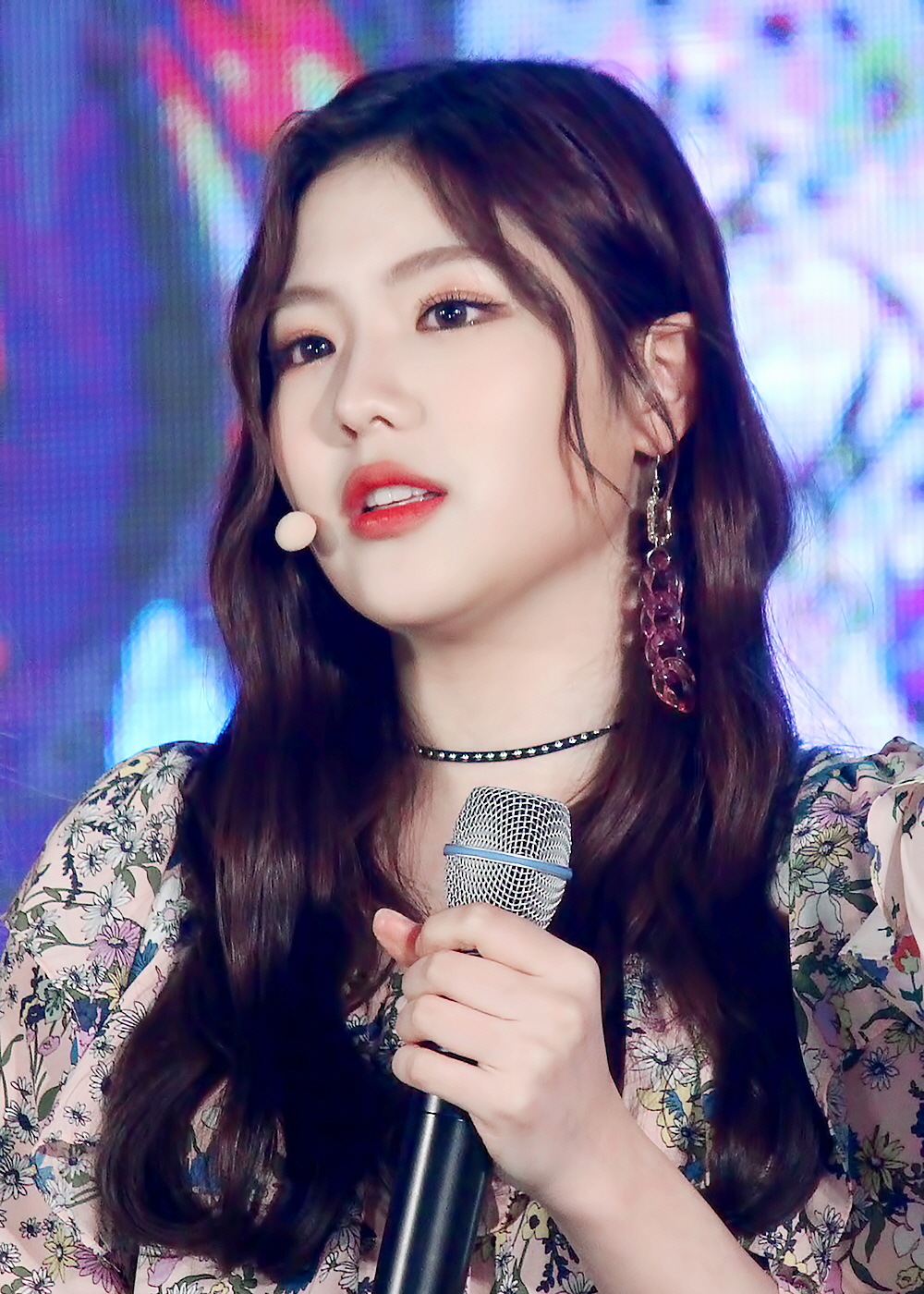
- Jo in May 2017
- Born: August 5, 2000 (age 26); South Korea
- Education: School of Performing Arts Seoul
- Occupations: Actress; singer
- Years active: 2016–present
- Agent: Beyond J
- Musical career
- Genres: K-pop
- Instrument: Vocals
- Years active: 2016–2018
- Label: Jellyfish
- Formerly of: Gugudan; Gugudan 5959

Korean name
- Hangul: 조혜연
- RR: Jo Hyeyeon
- MR: Cho Hyeyŏn

Stage name
- Hangul: 조아람
- RR: Jo Aram
- MR: Cho Aram

Jo Hye-yeon (Korean: 조혜연; born August 5, 2000), also known by her stage name Jo Aram (조아람), is a South Korean actress and former singer. She is a former member of South Korean girl group Gugudan, formed by Jellyfish Entertainment in 2016. After leaving the group in late 2018, she signed with Beyond J in March 2022 to pursue her career as an actress. She gained recognition for her role as Jeon So-ra in Doctor Cha (2023).

== Early life and education ==
Jo was born on August 5, 2000. Jo graduated from School of Performing Arts Seoul in 2019.

== Career ==
=== 2016–2020: Gugudan ===
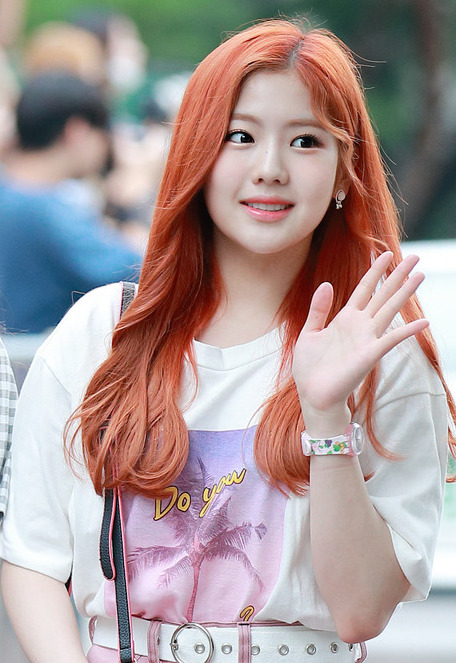
Jo during Gugudan 5959's promotion

In June 2016, Jo was introduced by her mononymous real name, Hyeyeon, as the maknae line of Jellyfish Entertainment's upcoming girl group. The group, Gugudan, debuted on June 28, 2016 with a mermaid concept in EP Act. 1 The Little Mermaid.

In July 2017, Jellyfish Entertainment announced that Jo will debut in a subunit with Kang Mi-na as Gugudan 5959 (구구단 오구오구; spelled as "Ogu-ogu") with the release of a single titled "Ice Chu" on August 10.

On May 17, 2018, it was announced that Jo would go on a temporary hiatus from all Gugudan's activities due to health issues, then departed from the group to focus on her study and health in October 2018.

=== 2022–present: Acting debut ===
After her contract expirations with Jellyfish Entertainment in 2021, Jo signed contract with Beyond J to pursue her acting career as Jo Aram. In 2022, she debuted as an actress in The Killer's Shopping List where she played a 7-years experienced part-time worker.

In 2023, she starred in JTBC's Doctor Cha as Jeon So-ra, a third year surgical resident with an intelligent appearance, urban vibe, tough personality, and strong work ethic. The role gave her recognition from the public and earned her two Best New Actress awards that year. During the same year, she was cast as one of the lead role in KBS Drama Special 2023: Overlap Knife, Knife.

== Discography ==
=== Soundtrack appearances ===
List of soundtrack appearances, showing year released and album name
Title	Year	Album
"Together" (달까지 가자) (with Lee Sun-bin and Ra Mi-ran)	2025	To the Moon OST Part 5

== Filmography ==
=== Film ===
Year	Title	Role	Ref.
2024	Victory	Kim Se-hyeon	

=== Television series ===
Year	Title	Role	Notes	Ref.
2022	The Killer's Shopping List	Alba		
2023	Doctor Cha	Jeon So-ra		
2023	KBS Drama Special: Overlap Knife, Knife	Yeon-hui	Season 14	
2024	The Auditors	Yoon Seo-jin		
2025	To the Moon	Kim Ji-song		
2026	A Love Other Than Yours	Park Su-ah		

== Awards and nominations ==
Award ceremony	Year	Category	Nominee(s)/Work(s)	Result	Ref.
APAN Star Awards	2023	Best New Actress	Doctor Cha	Won	
Brand of the Year Awards	2023	New Female Actress of the Year	Doctor Cha	Won	
MBC Drama Awards	2025	Best New Actress	To the Moon	Won	
