= Kim Yong-hwa =

South Korean filmmaker (born 1971)

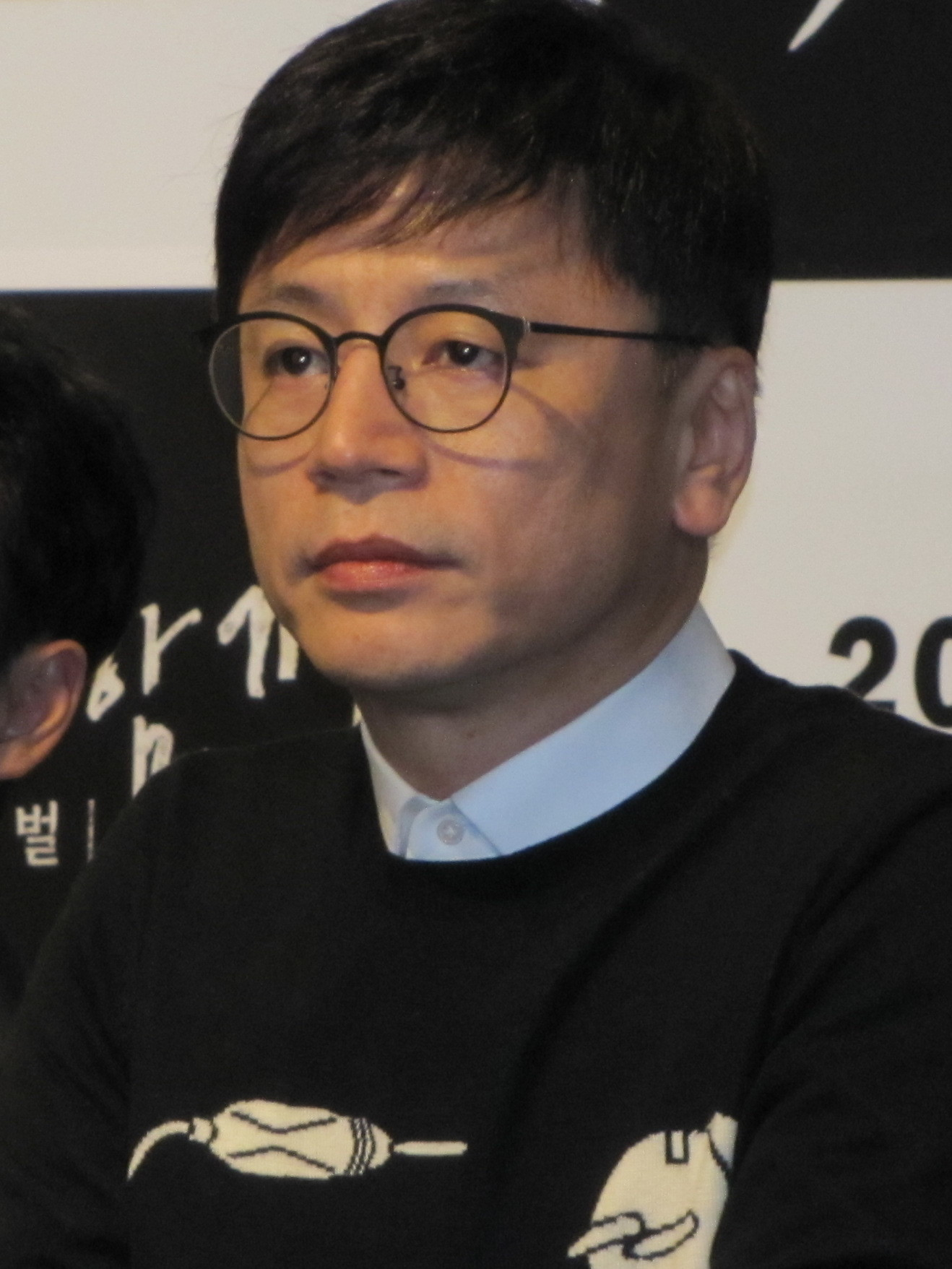
- Kim in 2017
- Born: September 25, 1971 (age 55); Chuncheon, South Korea
- Education: Chung Ang University
- Occupations: Film director, screenwriter
- Years active: 2003-present

Korean name
- Hangul: 김영화
- RR: Gim Yeonghwa
- MR: Kim Yŏnghwa

Kim Yong-hwa (Korean: 김영화; born September 25, 1971) is a South Korean filmmaker. His works included Oh! Brothers (2003), 200 Pounds Beauty (2006), Take Off (2009) and Mr. Go (2013).

== Career ==
Kim Yong-hwa majored in Film Studies at Chung-Ang University, but because of financial difficulties, it took him a decade to graduate. His graduation project in 1999 was the short film In the Jungle (titled "Salted Mackerel" in Korean), about two brothers (one of whom is a deaf-mute) taking care of a terminally ill mother, who are ordered to leave the hospital after they are late in paying the bills. In the Jungle won prizes at the 42nd Rochester International Film Festival and the 33rd Houston International Film Festival in 2000.

For his feature directorial debut, Kim wrote and directed Oh! Brothers, a comedy about an amoral, debt-ridden private detective who upon his father's death learns he has a younger half-brother with progeria, played by Lee Jung-jae and Lee Beom-soo. Oh! Brothers was the sixth best-selling Korean film of 2003, with 3.2 million tickets sold.

In 2006, Kim cast Kim Ah-joong in a star-making role as the protagonist of 200 Pounds Beauty (titled "It's Hard to Be a Beauty" in Korean), based on the Japanese manga Kanna-san Daiseikō Desu! by Yumiko Suzuki about an overweight ghost singer/phone sex operator who transforms her life after intensive plastic surgery and becomes a pop star. A romantic comedy as well as a satirical indictment of a hypocritical society that places too much value on appearance, the film's themes on beauty and self-esteem resonated with female Korean audiences, and 200 Pounds Beauty became a sleeper hit with 6.6 million admissions, making it the year's third best-selling domestic film. Kim won Best New Director at the 30th Golden Cinematography Awards in 2007, and received several nominations for directing and screenwriting.

Critics praised Kim for his smart, well-made commercial films, as well as for challenging the bias against physical disability and obesity in Korean society. Kim said, "Comedy starts off with pain. But is it really best to portray that pain in a painful way? If one has really experienced pain, and really gone to the depth of it, I doubt one will really put a raw edge on it. I am drawn to a movie that contains both joy and sadness, and at the same time remains simple and light. My answer to comedy is to include both 'a teardrop and a smile.'"

2009 sports film Take Off (titled "National Athlete" or "National Team" in Korean) became Kim's third consecutive box office hit. Starring Ha Jung-woo, Kim Dong-wook, Kim Ji-seok, Choi Jae-hwan, Lee Jae-eung and Sung Dong-il as a rag-tag group of athletes formed to support Muju City's 1996 Olympics bid but whose passion and competitive spirit won them a berth at the 1998 Nagano Winter Olympics, it was based on the true story of the oft-overlooked Korean national ski jumping team, which faced poor domestic support and unfavorable conditions but went on to win successive medals in the Winter Universiade. According to Kim, the protagonist played by Ha Jung-woo, an ex-U.S. junior alpine skier and adoptee who returns to Korea in search of his birth mother, was inspired by real-life athlete Toby Dawson. Take Off became the second highest-grossing Korean film of the year, with 8.8 million tickets sold. Kim won Best Director at the 29th Korean Association of Film Critics Awards, the 46th Grand Bell Awards, and the 30th Blue Dragon Film Awards, while Take Off won Best Film at the 17th Chunsa Film Art Awards and the 46th Baeksang Arts Awards.

Kim next took on his most ambitious project to date with Mr. Go, which had a ₩25 billion (US$22.5 million) budget (one of the largest budgets in Korean cinema history), with US$5 million funded by China-based Huayi Brothers. Based on Huh Young-man's 1984 manhwa The 7th Team, the film centers on a 15-year-old girl (played by Xu Jiao) who tries to save her grandfather's circus after the 2008 Sichuan earthquake by becoming the sports agent of a baseball-playing gorilla named Ling Ling (inspired by Christian the lion). Mr. Go was filmed in stereoscopic 3D, and Kim founded a new visual effects company Dexter Studios to develop and innovate motion capture and facial motion capture techniques, and a digital fur production program to make the gorilla as realistic as possible; a team of more than 500 animators and CG professionals spent four years on the production and over a year editing. Mr. Go was released in South Korea and China simultaneously in 2013; it was not a commercial success in South Korea, ending Kim's winning streak at the domestic box office. However, it fared better in Mainland China where it was marketed as a children's film and shown exclusively in 3D theaters (with premium ticket prices), making more than double the South Korean gross. Mr. Go also made a name for Dexter Studios, now recognized as a VFX pioneer in Korea.

In April 2022, Kim signed a contract with United Talent Agency

His next film, a sci-fi survival drama titled The Moon, was pre-sold in 155 countries even before the release, scheduled for August 2, 2023.

== Filmography ==
Feature films credits
Year	Title		Credited as			Ref.
Year	English	Korean	Director	Screenplay	Producer	Ref.
1999	In the Jungle	자반고등어	Yes	Yes	No	short film
2003	Oh! Brothers	오! 브라더스	Yes	Yes	No	
2006	200 Pounds Beauty	미녀는 괴로워	Yes	Yes	No	
2009	Take Off	국가대표	Yes	Yes	Yes	
2011	My Way	마이 웨이	No	No	executive producer	
2013	Mr. Go	미스터 고	Yes	Yes	executive producer	also editor
2017	Along With the Gods: The Two Worlds	신과함께: 죄와 벌	Yes	Yes	No	
2018	Along with the Gods: The Last 49 Days	신과함께: 인과 연	Yes	Yes	No	
2023	The Moon	더 문	Yes	Yes	Yes	

== Accolades ==
=== Awards and nominations ===
Year	Award	Category	Recipients	Result	Ref.
2000	the 42nd Rochester International Film Festival	Best short film	In the Jungle	Won	
2000	the 33rd Houston International Film Festival	Best short film	In the Jungle	Won	
2007	30th Golden Cinematography Awards	Best New Director	200 Pounds Beauty	Won	
2007	44th Grand Bell Awards	Best Film	200 Pounds Beauty	Nominated	
2007	44th Grand Bell Awards	Best Director	200 Pounds Beauty	Nominated	
2007	28th Blue Dragon Film Awards	Best Film	200 Pounds Beauty	Nominated	
2007	28th Blue Dragon Film Awards	Best Director	200 Pounds Beauty	Nominated	
2007	28th Blue Dragon Film Awards	Best Screenplay	200 Pounds Beauty	Nominated	
2009	17th Chunsa Film Art Awards	Best Film	Take Off	Won	
2009	29th Korean Association of Film Critics Awards	Best Director	Take Off	Won	
2009	46th Grand Bell Awards	Best Film	Take Off	Nominated	
2009	46th Grand Bell Awards	Best Director	Take Off	Won	
2009	46th Grand Bell Awards	Best Planning	Take Off	Nominated	
2009	30th Blue Dragon Film Awards	Best Film	Take Off	Nominated	
2009	30th Blue Dragon Film Awards	Best Director	Take Off	Won	
2009	30th Blue Dragon Film Awards	Best Screenplay	Take Off	Nominated	
2009	Young Artist of Today	Film category	Take Off	Won	
2010	46th Baeksang Arts Awards	Best Film	Take Off	Won	
2010	46th Baeksang Arts Awards	Best Director – Film	Take Off	Nominated	
2017	12th Asian Film Awards	Best Action Film	Along with the Gods: The Two Worlds	Nominated	
2017	12th Asian Film Awards	Best Production Design	Along with the Gods: The Two Worlds	Nominated	
2018	54th Baeksang Arts Awards	Best Film	Along with the Gods: The Two Worlds	Nominated	
2018	54th Baeksang Arts Awards	Best Director – Film	Along with the Gods: The Two Worlds	Won	
2018	39th Blue Dragon Film Awards	Best Film	Along with the Gods: The Two Worlds	Nominated	
2018	39th Blue Dragon Film Awards	Audience Choice	Along with the Gods: The Two Worlds	Won	
2018	39th Blue Dragon Film Awards	Best Director	Along with the Gods: The Two Worlds	Nominated	
2018	39th Blue Dragon Film Awards	Audience Choice Award for Most Popular Film	Along with the Gods: The Two Worlds	Won	
2018	23rd Chunsa Film Art Awards	Special Audience Award for Best Film	Along with the Gods: The Two Worlds	Won	
2018	9th KOFRA Film Awards	Film Person of the Year	Along with the Gods: The Two Worlds	Won	
2018	2nd The Seoul Awards	Best Film	Along with the Gods: The Two Worlds	Nominated	
2018	27th Buil Film Awards	Best Director	Along with the Gods: The Last 49 Days	Nominated	
2018	27th Buil Film Awards	Best Art Direction	Along with the Gods: The Last 49 Days	Nominated	
2018	55th Grand Bell Awards	Best Film	Along with the Gods: The Last 49 Days	Nominated	
2018	55th Grand Bell Awards	Best Director	Along with the Gods: The Last 49 Days	Nominated	
2018	55th Grand Bell Awards	Best Planning	Along with the Gods: The Last 49 Days	Nominated	

=== State honors ===
Name of country, year given, and name of honor
Country	Award Ceremony	Year	Honor	Ref.
South Korea	Korean Content Awards (Note: Honors are given at the Korean Content Awards (대한민국 콘텐츠 대상) arranged by the Korea Creative Content Agency and hosted by the Ministry of Culture, Sports and Tourism. The 2022 Korea Content Awards Ceremony, which started in 2009 and celebrated its 14th this year, aims to inspire pride in the content industry and develop the Korean cultural content industry by discovering and awarding contributors and excellent content that have contributed to the development of the content industry in 2022. It is a place to promote. The winners (works) of honor, which are recommended through the website of the Korea Creative Content Agency (www.kocca.kr) and announced through careful examination by experts and three-step verification, play a leading role in shining the Korean content industry in the world.)	2015	Presidential Commendation; Contribution to Overseas Expansion Category for Dexter Studio's works	

== See also ==
- List of Korean-language films
- Cinema of South Korea
- Contemporary culture of South Korea
