= Along with the Gods: The Last 49 Days =

- Theatrical release poster
- Hangul: 신과함께: 인과 연
- Hanja: 神과함께: 因와 緣
- RR: Singwa hamkke: ingwa yeon
- MR: Sin'gwa hamkke: in'gwa yŏn
- Directed by: Kim Yong-hwa
- Screenplay by: Kim Yong-hwa
- Based on: Along with the Gods by Joo Ho-min
- Produced by: Kim Yong-hwa; Won Dong-yeon; Kim Ho-Sung
- Starring: Ha Jung-woo; Ju Ji-hoon; Kim Hyang-gi; Ma Dong-seok; Kim Dong-wook
- Cinematography: Kim Byung-seo
- Edited by: Kim Hye-jin; Zino Kim
- Music by: Bang Jun-seok
- Production companies: Realies Pictures; Dexter Studios
- Distributed by: Lotte Entertainment
- Release date: August 1, 2018
- Running time: 141 minutes
- Country: South Korea
- Language: Korean
- Budget: ₩20 billion (US$18.3 million)
- Box office: US$92.5 million (South Korea)

Along with the Gods: The Last 49 Days (Korean: 신과함께: 인과 연) is a 2018 South Korean fantasy action film directed by Kim Yong-hwa and based on a webtoon by Joo Ho-min, Along With the Gods. It is a sequel to the 2017 film Along with the Gods: The Two Worlds. It stars Ha Jung-woo, Ju Ji-hoon, Kim Hyang-gi, Ma Dong-seok and Kim Dong-wook. The film was released on August 1, 2018.

== Plot ==
The three grim reapers Gang-rim, Haewonmak and Lee Deok-choon will guide their 49th soul Kim Soo-hong to the afterlife trials. Meanwhile, God of the House will recover the grim reapers' memories from 1,000 years ago.

== Cast ==
- Ha Jung-woo as Gang-rim, the wise and careful Grim Reaper and leader of his group.
- Ju Ji-hoon as Hae Won-mak, the young, energetic, and sarcastic Grim Reaper proficient in swords.
- Kim Hyang-gi as Lee Deok-choon, the youngest of the Grim Reapers with psychic abilities.
- Ma Dong-seok as Seongju, a house deity who becomes an ally to Gang-rim and his team.
- Kim Dong-wook as Kim Soo-hong, a vengeful spirit now relieved of his torment.
- Doh Kyung-soo as Private Won Dong-yeon
- Lee Joon-hyuk as First Lieutenant Park Moo-shin
- Nam Il-woo as Heo Choon-sam
- Ye Soo-jung as Soo-hong's mother
- Jung Ji-hoon as Heo Hyun-dong
- Jung Ah-mi as Kang Rim
- Oh Hee-joon as the Translator soldier of Goryeo
- Kim Myung-gon
- Jo Han-chul as Judge
- Jung Yoo-ahn
- Lee Jung-jae as Yeomra
- Sung Dong-il
- Kim Min-jong as Afterlife Messenger

== Production ==
- Along With the Gods Part 1 and 2 took ₩40 billion (around US$36.6 million) to produce. Both parts of the film were shot simultaneously. Dexter Studios, one of Asia's largest film production and visual effects studios, which was behind director Kim Yong-hwa's previous film Mr. Go (2013), created the visual effects for the film. It was reported that around 300 artists and technicians took part in the film's production.
- Chinese production company Alpha Pictures invested $2.2 million.
- Filming began on May 26, 2016, and ended on March 22, 2017, for parts 1 and 2.
- Some scenes that featured actors Oh Dal-su and Choi Il-hwa were re-shot due to their controversies as they were replaced with substitute actors.

== Reception ==
=== Critical response ===
On review aggregator Rotten Tomatoes, the film has an approval rating of 44% based on nine reviews and an average rating of 5.5/10. James Marsh of the South China Morning Post rated it 2/5.

Elizabeth Kerr of The Hollywood Reporter gave a mixed review and wrote, "Though the two films were shot simultaneously, there's a sense of 'more' to Along with the Gods: The Last 49 Days that doesn't do it any service. Like many a sequel bent on topping its predecessor to prove the first entry wasn't a fluke, the result is just a bigger, noisier, less focused slog rather than continued world-building."

Noel Murray of the Los Angeles Times gave a mixed review and wrote, "While Along with the Gods: The Last 49 Days is awkwardly bloated, it does eventually develop some momentum. Once viewers get accustomed to a movie that can move within minutes from courtroom drama to dinosaur attacks, they may enjoy the overwhelming spectacle of it all."

Adeline Tan of The Strait Times gave 3.5 ticks and wrote: "the 141-minute movie, with its complex storyline, can be draggy at times, and the constant scene-changing can be confusing."

Yoon Min-sik of The Korea Herald wrote: "The film is one that had the potential to be great but ended up just being OK, and that is not OK."

Jason Bechervaise of Screen International wrote: "Although at times, the special effects look clunky, some of the more ambitious set-pieces are impressive given how such a film produced in Hollywood would invariably require a more sizeable budget."

=== Box office ===
==== South Korea ====
Prior to its release, Along with the Gods: The Last 49 Days set the record for the highest pre-sale tickets in South Korea's box office history with a 60.5% reservation rate. The rate reached 42 million, outdoing the record of the 2017 film The Battleship Island which reached the same number of reservations on the day before the opening of the film.

The film also broke the opening day record in South Korea by attracting 1,263,788 viewers on the first day of its release, which is more than twice the amount of Along with the Gods: The Two Worlds (422,339 viewers). On the second day of its release, the film attracted more than 2 million viewers. On August 4, the film attracted 1,466,416 viewers, making the film set a record of the most viewers in a single day, surpassing Avengers: Infinity War which attracted 1,333,310 viewers in a single day before. On August 5, it was reported that Along with the Gods had attracted 5,409,817 viewers on its fifth day, making the film the fastest to reach such number, surpassing Along with the Gods: The Two Worlds which set the record in a week, and The Admiral: Roaring Currents, the first most viewed film in Korea, which set the record in a six days. Along with the Gods placed first in the weekly box office. The film accumulated $46.2 million from 6.2 million admissions. Along with the Gods holds the record for the fastest film to reach 7, 8 and 9 million views in South Korean box office history. It passed 10 million views on August 16, 2018. The film passed 12 million views as of August 30, 2018, becoming the 13th most-watched film of all time in South Korea.

==== Taiwan ====
On its first day of release, Along with the Gods: The Last 49 Days scored 37 million. It became the film with the biggest opening week gross for any Korean film in Taiwan, scoring 5.8 million in ticket sales in a week. The film had the third-highest first week sales after Avengers: Infinity War and Jurassic World: Fallen Kingdom in Taiwan.

==== Hong Kong ====
Before its official release, Along with the Gods: The Last 49 Days scored 8 million in pre-sales in Hong Kong. On its day of release in Hong Kong, the film earned 3.18 million, topping the box office. On August 9, the film reached 10 million and scored 20 million on its fourth day of release, achieving the highest first week sales in Hong Kong.

==== Other countries ====
Along with the Gods: The Last 49 Days had the biggest opening week gross for any Korean film in North America, Australia, New Zealand and Taiwan.

== Awards and nominations ==
Awards	Category	Recipient	Result	Ref.
27th Buil Film Awards	Best Director	Kim Yong-hwa	Nominated	
27th Buil Film Awards	Best Art Direction	Lee Mok-won	Nominated	
55th Grand Bell Awards	Best Film	Along with the Gods: The Last 49 Days	Nominated	
55th Grand Bell Awards	Best Director	Kim Yong-hwa	Nominated	
55th Grand Bell Awards	Best Editing	Kim Jin-oh, Kim Hye-jin	Nominated	
55th Grand Bell Awards	Best Art Direction	Lee Mok-won	Nominated	
55th Grand Bell Awards	Best Costume Design	Jo Sang-kyung	Nominated	
55th Grand Bell Awards	Technical Award	Jin Jong-hyun	Won	
55th Grand Bell Awards	Best Planning	Along with the Gods: The Last 49 Days	Nominated	
39th Blue Dragon Film Awards	Audience Choice Award for Most Popular Film	Along with the Gods: The Last 49 Days (2nd)	Won	
18th Director's Cut Awards	Best New Actor	Do Kyung-soo	Won	
55th Baeksang Arts Awards	Technical Award	Jin Jong-hyun (VFX)	Nominated	

== Sequels ==
Third and fourth installments are currently in development, with Kim Yong-hwa returning to direct the sequels.
