= Along with the Gods: The Two Worlds =

- Theatrical release poster
- Hangul: 신과함께: 죄와 벌
- Hanja: 神과함께: 罪와 罰
- Lit.: Together with God: Sin and Punishment
- RR: Singwa hamkke: joewa beol
- MR: Sin'gwa hamkke: choewa pŏl
- Directed by: Kim Yong-hwa
- Screenplay by: Kim Yong-hwa
- Based on: Along with the Gods by Joo Ho-min
- Produced by: Kim Yong-hwa; Won Dong-yeon; Kim Ho-Sung
- Starring: Ha Jung-woo; Cha Tae-hyun; Ju Ji-hoon; Kim Hyang-gi
- Cinematography: Kim Byung-seo
- Edited by: Kim Hye-jin; Zino Kim; Nam Na-young
- Music by: Bang Jun-seok
- Production companies: Realies Pictures; Dexter Studios
- Distributed by: Lotte Entertainment
- Release date: 20 December 2017
- Running time: 140 minutes
- Country: South Korea
- Language: Korean
- Budget: ₩20 billion ($18.3 million)
- Box office: $109.4 million

Along with the Gods: The Two Worlds (Korean: 신과함께: 죄와 벌) is a 2017 South Korean fantasy action film directed by Kim Yong-hwa and based on the webtoon series by Joo Ho-min, Along with the Gods, which was inspired by the Korean Joseon dynasty Buddhist paintings and early Buddhist texts of the Ten Kings of Hell. It stars Ha Jung-woo, Cha Tae-hyun, Ju Ji-hoon and Kim Hyang-gi.

The film was shot as one but presented in two parts. The first part, Along with the Gods: The Two Worlds, was released on 20 December 2017. In June 2018, it was announced that another two sequels are scheduled to be filmed in 2019. The sequel, titled Along with the Gods: The Last 49 Days, was released on 1 August 2018.

As of May 2019, Along with the Gods: The Two Worlds was the third highest-grossing film in South Korean cinema history.

== Plot ==
Firefighter Kim Ja-hong dies in the line of duty and is escorted to the afterlife by three Grim Reapers: Hae Won-maek, Lee Deok-choon and their leader Gang-rim. They are to escort and defend Ja-hong as his guardians in seven trials within 49 days. If he passes, he will be reincarnated and his guardians will be given credit towards their own reincarnation.

In the first court, Hell of Murder, Ja-hong is tried for the death of his colleague, who was trapped beneath rubble during a fire and seemingly left to die by Ja-hong. Just as he is about to be sentenced, it is revealed that his colleague told him to prioritize saving civilians over himself. After rescuing eight others, Ja-hong attempted to go back for his colleague only to be held back as the building collapsed. The judge acquits Ja-hong.

In the second court, Hell of Indolence, Ja-hong's guardians present his selflessness and diligence. Ja-hong blurts out that he only worked for money and is about to be punished when Gang-rim interjects, stating that the money was to support his brother and ailing mother, and thus secures his second acquittal.

On the way to the Hell of Deceit, ghouls attack as the physics of Hell begins to morph. This change indicates that a member of Ja-hong's families had died and became a vengeful spirit. Gang-rim leaves the party to investigate while the remaining group proceeds. In the court, Ja-hong is accused of writing fake letters to the family of those who had died, one of whom is Ji-yeon, the daughter of his fallen colleague. Gang-rim supernaturally links with Deok-choon from the living world to defend Ja-hong, stating that he had also written fake letters to his mom to cheer her up, allowing her to focus on her health, and that the letters to Ji-Yeon, despite her understanding that her father was dead, helped her cope with her loss. The evidence is thrown out and the charges are dismissed.

Gang-rim determines that it is Ja-hong's brother Soo-hong who has become the vengeful spirit. He finds that Soo-hong has been accidentally killed while on guard duty by his partner Dong-yeon, and his death was covered up by their superior, Lieutenant Park Moo-shin. Gang-rim foils an attempt by Soo-hong to kill Dong-yeon and learns that Soo-hong's grudge was not against Ja-hong, but rather Dong-yeon and Moo-shin. Dong-yeon tips off Soo-hong's mother on the location of his body and attempts suicide. He is saved by Gang-rim at Soo-hong's request after the latter agreed to cooperate.

The trio passes through the Hells of Injustice and Betrayal without trial. In the Hell of Violence, Ja-hong is tried for beating Soo-hong when they were younger while the latter was malnourished. As Ja-hong was not forgiven, he was convicted and was about to be punished when Gang-rim instructed Deok-choon to request a combined trial at the next court, the Hell of Filial Impiety. The request is granted. Ja-hong reveals that, due to poverty, he intended to commit familicide by killing his mother but was discovered by Soo-hong. In a fit, he beat up Soo-hong and fled out of guilt, opting not to be a burden and dedicating his life to supporting them.

Gang-rim and Soo-hong arrive at the army base, only to witness the mother's shabby treatment at the hands of Park. Enraged, Soo-hong transforms back into a vengeful spirit and lashes out at the base by conjuring up a massive tornado, only stopping when he realizes how his actions are affecting Ja-hong in the afterlife.

At the Hell of Filial Impiety, Ja-hong is immediately judged by Yeomra to be guilty. He learns that on the night of his attempted murder-suicide, his mother was actually awake and had decided to allow it, knowing that she was a burden on her family. Soo-hong, with the help of Gang-rim and Won-maek, enters his mother's dream and learns that she had already forgiven Ja-hong for that night. Since sins that have been forgiven in the living world are not allowed to be judged in the afterlife, Ja-hong is allowed to reincarnate.

Afterward, Gang-rim realizes that Yeomra had been meddling with his investigation of Soo-hong. He decides to confront Yeomra directly and chooses Soo-hong as the group's final soul before their own reincarnation.

== Cast ==
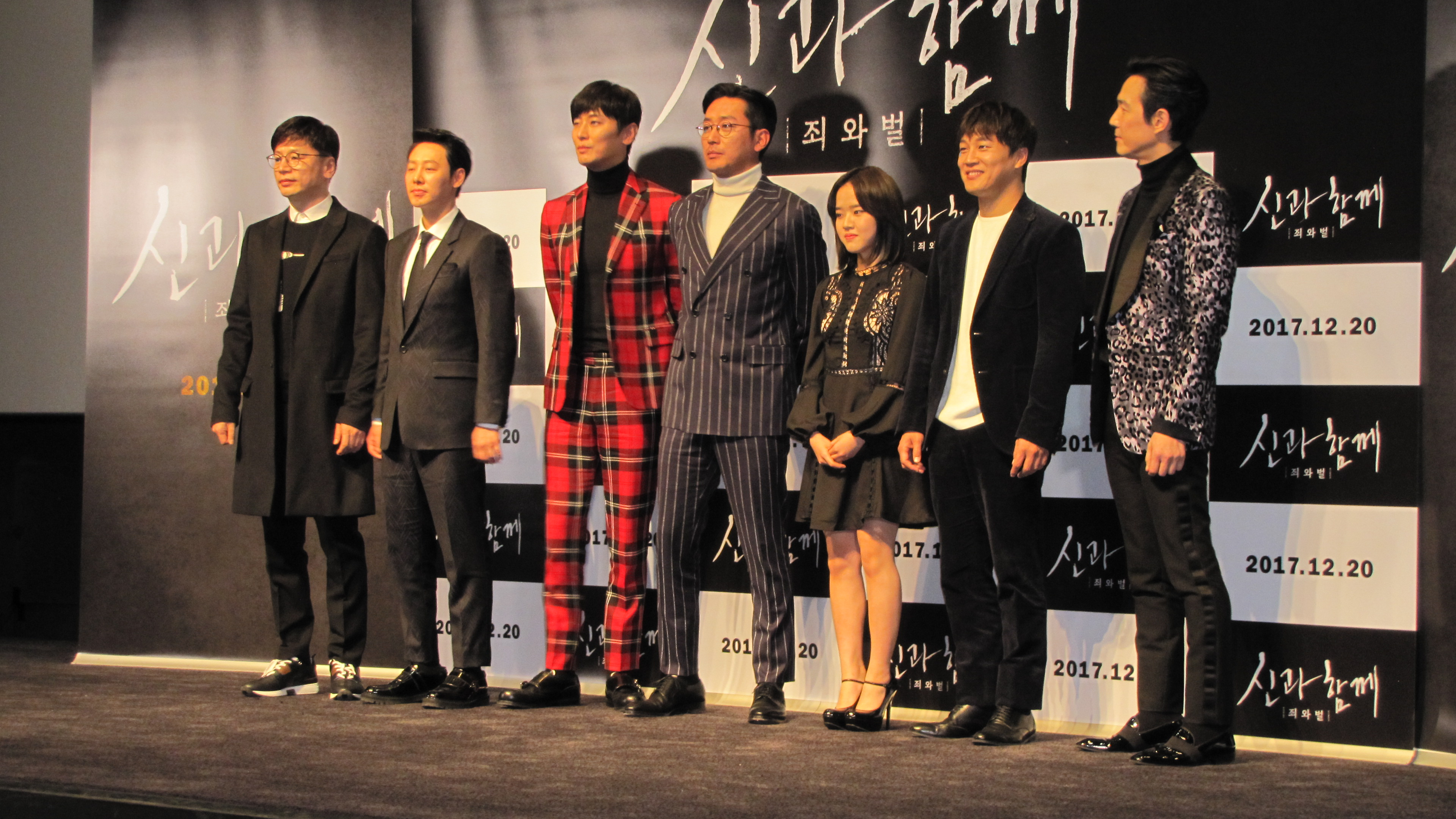
Director Kim Yong-hwa (left) with the cast of the film.

=== Main ===
- Ha Jung-woo as Gang-rim, a wise and careful Grim Reaper and the leader of Haewonmak and Deok-choon.
- Cha Tae-hyun as Kim Ja-hong, a firefighter with a heart of gold and kindness.
- Ju Ji-hoon as Haewonmak, a younger, energetic, and sarcastic Grim Reaper who is proficient with sword fighting. He is represented by the Sun.
- Kim Hyang-gi as Lee Deok-choon, the youngest of the Grim Reapers who even though weak and less experienced, has powerful psychic powers. She is represented by the Moon.

=== Supporting ===
- Kim Dong-wook as Kim Soo-hong, the main antagonist of the film and Kim Ja-hong's younger brother. An aspiring lawyer, he was serving in the military until he was murdered and buried alive by his comrades Won Dong-yeon and Park Moo-shin. As a result, he became a vengeful spirit and starts terrorizing the underworld.
- Doh Kyung-soo as Private Won Dong-yeon
- Jang Gwang as Jingwang, God of Violence Hell
- Jung Hae-kyun as Byeonseong, God of Murder Hell
- Oh Dal-su as Prosecutor
- Im Won-hee as Prosecutor
- Lee Joon-hyuk as First Lieutenant Park Moo-shin
- Kim Su-an as Taesan, goddess of deceit hell
- Kang Da-hyun as Ji-yeon
- Yoon Ji-on as Soo-hong's legionnaire
- Ye Soo-jung as Ja-hong's mother
- Jung Ji-hoon as Heo Hyun-dong
- Nam Il-woo as Heo Choon-sam
- Oh Hee-joon as Interpreter soldier
- Sung Yu-bin as young Ja-hong
- Goo Seung-hyun as young Soo-hong
- Kim Keu-rim as First Lieutenant Park's wife
- Jung A-mi as Kang Rim-moo

=== Special appearance ===
- Yoo Jun-sang as Ja-hong's fellow firefighter
- Lee Jung-jae as Yeomra, king of the underworld.
- Kim Soo-ro as girl's father
- Kim Ha-neul as Songje, God of Betrayal Hell
- Kim Hae-sook as Chogang, God of Indolence Hell
- Lee Geung-young as Ogwan, Great King of the Senses
- Kim Min-jong as Afterlife Messenger
- Ma Dong-seok as Seongju, a house deity.

== Production ==
Along with the Gods took ₩40 billion (around US$36.6 million) to produce. Both parts of the film were shot simultaneously. Dexter Studios, one of Asia's largest film production and visual effects studios, who was behind director Kim Yong-hwa's previous film Mr. Go (2013), created the visual effects for the film. It was reported that around 300 artists and technicians took part in the film's production. Chinese production company Alpha Pictures invested $2.2 million. Filming began on 26 May 2016 and ended on 22 March 2017.

== Release ==
Along with the Gods: The Two Worlds was released in the Korean cinemas on 20 December 2017. The film was pre-sold to 12 countries and regions including: Taiwan, Hong Kong, Macau, Singapore, Malaysia, Indonesia, Brunei, the Philippines, Cambodia, Laos, the U.S and Canada at the Asian Film Market in Busan. Further, the film was pre-sold to another 90 countries at the American Film Market (AFM) in Santa Monica, California, U.S.A, increasing the number of countries released to 103 in total.

== Reception ==
=== Box office ===
==== South Korea ====
Upon its release in the theaters, the film attracted 422,339 viewers on its first day and topped the box office with nearly US$2.9 million gross. By 22 December 2017, it surpassed the 1 million viewer mark and grossed a total of US$9.3 million.

By 31 December 2017, the film had attracted 8,523,149 viewers with a total earning of US$63.9 million. As of 3 January 2018, it attracted 10 million viewers in just 15 days.

By 10 February 2018, Along with the Gods: The Two Worlds grossed more than US$105 million and became the second highest-grossing film in South Korea.

==== Taiwan ====
Upon its release in the theaters in Taiwan on 22 December 2017, the film grossed NT$5 million. In the first week of its release, the film grossed NT$30 million, topping the weekend box office and became the second highest-grossing Korean film of all time in Taiwan. After a week of its release, the film grossed NT$50 million. On the 10th day of its release, the film grossed NT$100 million. On 16 January 2018, the film overtook Train to Busan to become the highest-grossing Korean film in Taiwan, after grossing near to NT$350 million. A month after its release in Taiwan, the film grossed NT$404 million.

==== Hong Kong ====
Prior to its official release, the film grossed HK$2.4 million from preview tickets sales. On its opening day, the film grossed HK$5 million. As of 14 January, the film attracted more than 280,000 viewers and grossed HK$12.5 million. As of 16 January, the film grossed more than HK$16 million, surpassing The Battleship Island to become the second highest-grossing Korean film in Hong Kong. As of 28 January, the film grossed over HK$40 million.

=== Critical response ===
Review aggregator Rotten Tomatoes reports that 67% of critics have given the film a positive review based on nine reviews, with an average rating of 6.8/10. Andy Webster of The New York Times wrote: "Kim Yong-hwa's delirious fantasy "Along With the Gods: The Two Worlds" is a harmless romp flirting at profundity without coming close. But it certainly offers plenty to occupy the eye. Rarely has a director so reveled in the possibilities of digital effects (with the exception of Robert Rodriguez during his "Adventures of Sharkboy and Lavagirl" period). That said, story clarity and emotional depth tend to evaporate amid the visual pyrotechnics." James Marsh of the South China Morning Post gave the film three out of five stars, stating that it is "engulfed by melodrama towards the end, but along the way there is fun to be had." Yip Wai Yee of The Straits Times wrote that the film "may be soap-opera melodrama, but at least it is unapologetic about it." In a negative review, Robert Abele of the Los Angeles Times wrote, "Along With the Gods strains to whimsically entertain, but routinely fails its smaller human-sized moments due to convoluted plot twists." Elizabeth Kerr of The Hollywood Reporter wrote: "In general, the film is strong technically, but appropriate though it may be, Bang Jun-suk's syrupy, string-heavy score in the last act is likely to cause cavities."

== Adaptation ==
On 28 December 2017, Realies Pictures, the production company of Along with the Gods: The Two Worlds, announced a television adaptation of the film. According to the company, the script will be written in 2018, and the drama would be produced in 2019.

== Awards and nominations ==
Award	Category	Nominee	Results	Ref.
9th KOFRA Film Awards	Film Person of the Year	Kim Yong-hwa	Won	
12th Asian Film Awards	Best Action Film	Along with the Gods: The Two Worlds	Nominated	
12th Asian Film Awards	Best Production Design	Lee Mok-won	Nominated	
12th Asian Film Awards	Best Visual Effects	Jin Jong-hyun	Nominated	
54th Baeksang Arts Awards	Best Film	Along with the Gods: The Two Worlds	Nominated	
54th Baeksang Arts Awards	Best Director	Kim Yong-hwa	Won	
54th Baeksang Arts Awards	Technical Award	Jin Jong-hyun	Won	
54th Baeksang Arts Awards	Best Supporting Actor	Kim Dong-wook	Nominated	
23rd Chunsa Film Art Awards	Special Audience Award for Best Film	Along with the Gods: The Two Worlds	Won	
23rd Chunsa Film Art Awards	Best Supporting Actor	Kim Dong-wook	Won	
23rd Chunsa Film Art Awards	Best Supporting Actress	Kim Hyang-gi	Nominated	
23rd Chunsa Film Art Awards	Technical Award	—N/a	Nominated	
27th Buil Film Awards	Best Director	Kim Yong-hwa	Nominated	
27th Buil Film Awards	Best Art Direction	Lee Mok-won	Nominated	
2nd The Seoul Awards	Best Film	Along with the Gods: The Two Worlds	Nominated	
2nd The Seoul Awards	Best Actor	Ha Jung-woo	Won	
2nd The Seoul Awards	Best Supporting Actor	Ju Ji-hoon	Won	
2nd The Seoul Awards	Best Supporting Actress	Ye Soo-jung	Won	
38th Korean Association of Film Critics Awards	Best Technology (Visual Effects)	Jin Jong-hyun	Won	
39th Blue Dragon Film Awards	Best Film	Along with the Gods: The Two Worlds	Nominated	
39th Blue Dragon Film Awards	Audience Choice	Along with the Gods: The Two Worlds	Won	
39th Blue Dragon Film Awards	Best Director	Kim Yong-hwa	Nominated	
39th Blue Dragon Film Awards	Best Actor	Ha Jung-woo	Nominated	
39th Blue Dragon Film Awards	Best Supporting Actor	Kim Dong-wook	Nominated	
39th Blue Dragon Film Awards	Best Supporting Actress	Kim Hyang-gi	Won	
39th Blue Dragon Film Awards	Best Cinematography and Lightning	Kim Byung-seo & Shin Kyung-man	Nominated	
39th Blue Dragon Film Awards	Best Editing	Kim Jin-oh & Kim Hye-jin	Nominated	
39th Blue Dragon Film Awards	Best Art Direction	Lee Mok-won	Nominated	
39th Blue Dragon Film Awards	Technical Award (Visual Effects)	Along with the Gods: The Two Worlds	Won	
39th Blue Dragon Film Awards	Popular Star Award	Kim Hyang-gi	Won	
39th Blue Dragon Film Awards	Audience Choice Award for Most Popular Film	Along with the Gods: The Two Worlds (1st)	Won	
5th Korean Film Producers Association Awards	Technical Award	Jin Jong-hyun	Won	
