= Shim Eun-kyung =

South Korean actress (born 1994)

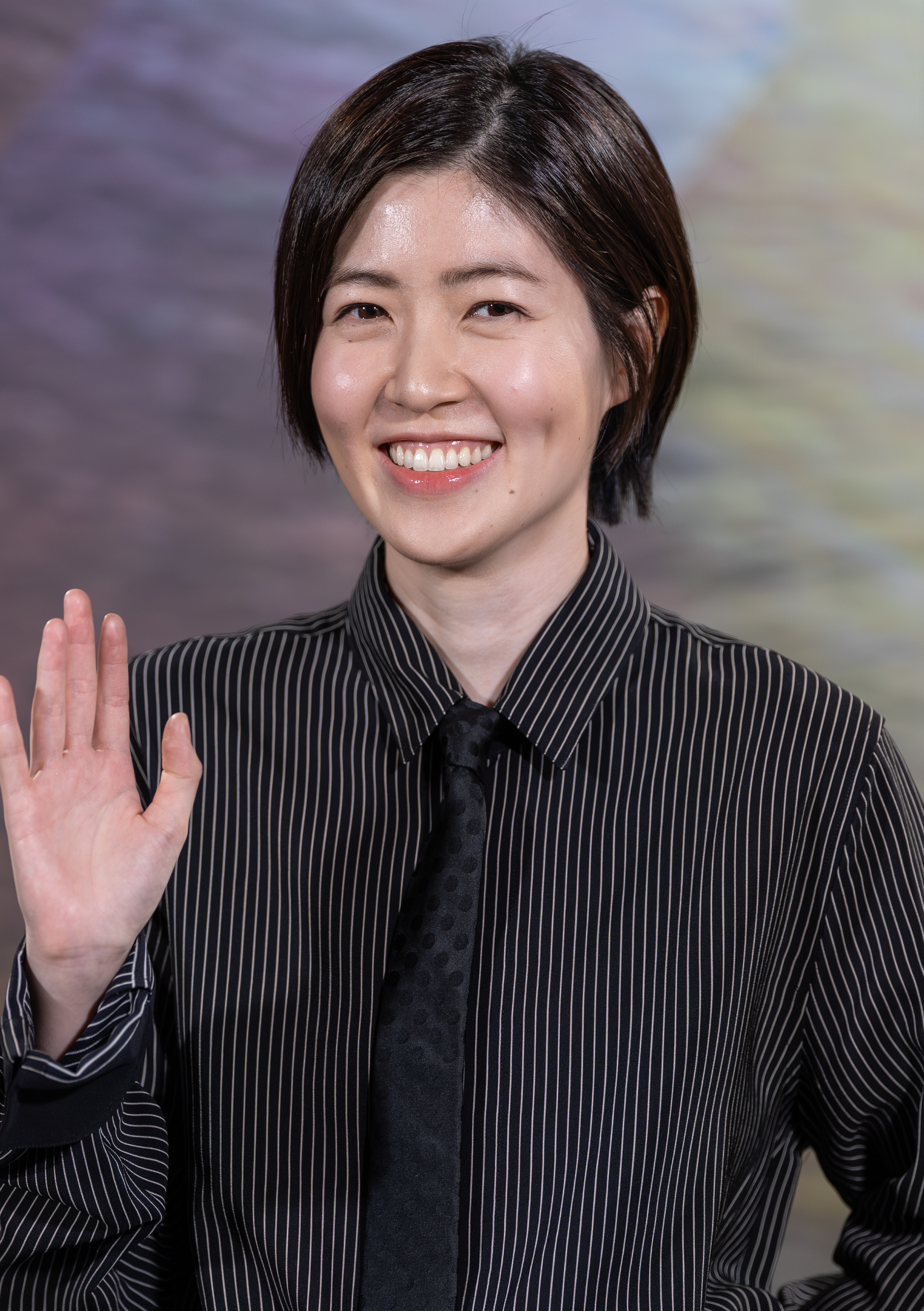
- Shim at the 2025 Locarno Film Festival
- Born: May 31, 1994 (age 32); Gangneung, South Korea
- Education: Professional Children's School
- Occupation: Actress
- Years active: 2004–present
- Agents: PanPare Inc. (South Korea); Humanité (Japan)

Korean name
- Hangul: 심은경
- RR: Sim Eungyeong
- MR: Sim Ŭn'gyŏng

Shim Eun-kyung (Korean: 심은경; born May 31, 1994) is a South Korean actress. She starred in the box office hits Sunny (2011), Miss Granny (2014) and Fabricated City (2017), as well as television series Naeil's Cantabile (2014). She has starred in both Korean and Japanese language entertainment. In 2020, she became the first Korean to win Best Actress at the Japanese Academy Awards (Japan's equivalent of the Oscars).

== Career ==
Shim made her acting debut at age 9 in the 2004 TV series The Woman Who Wants to Marry, and subsequently made a career as one of the best child actresses of her generation. She first gained attention for her role as a sexually abused girl in the horror fairytale Hansel and Gretel, and also starred in TV series such as Hwang Jini, The Legend, Women of the Sun, and The Great Merchant; critics say at times she even outshone her adult counterparts.

In 2011, she successfully transitioned to a lead actress role in the retro dramedy Sunny, which tells the story of seven women, crosscutting between their lives in the present and the experiences that first brought them together as teenagers in the 1980s. Recognized for its period detail, witty dialogue and the performances of its ensemble cast, the film shattered the commonly-held belief that women-centric pictures can't be blockbusters. By appealing to a wide range of age groups, Sunny's box office total reached more than 7 million admissions by the end of its long run. Director Kang Hyeong-cheol described Shim as someone "who is already complete as an actress."

Shim's other notable roles include a girl caught up in chaos of the Korean War in black comedy Kyung-sook, Kyung-sook's Father (also known as My Dad Loves Trouble), a sister with seemingly supernatural abilities in Possessed, a depressive in The Quiz Show Scandal, and a court taster in Masquerade.

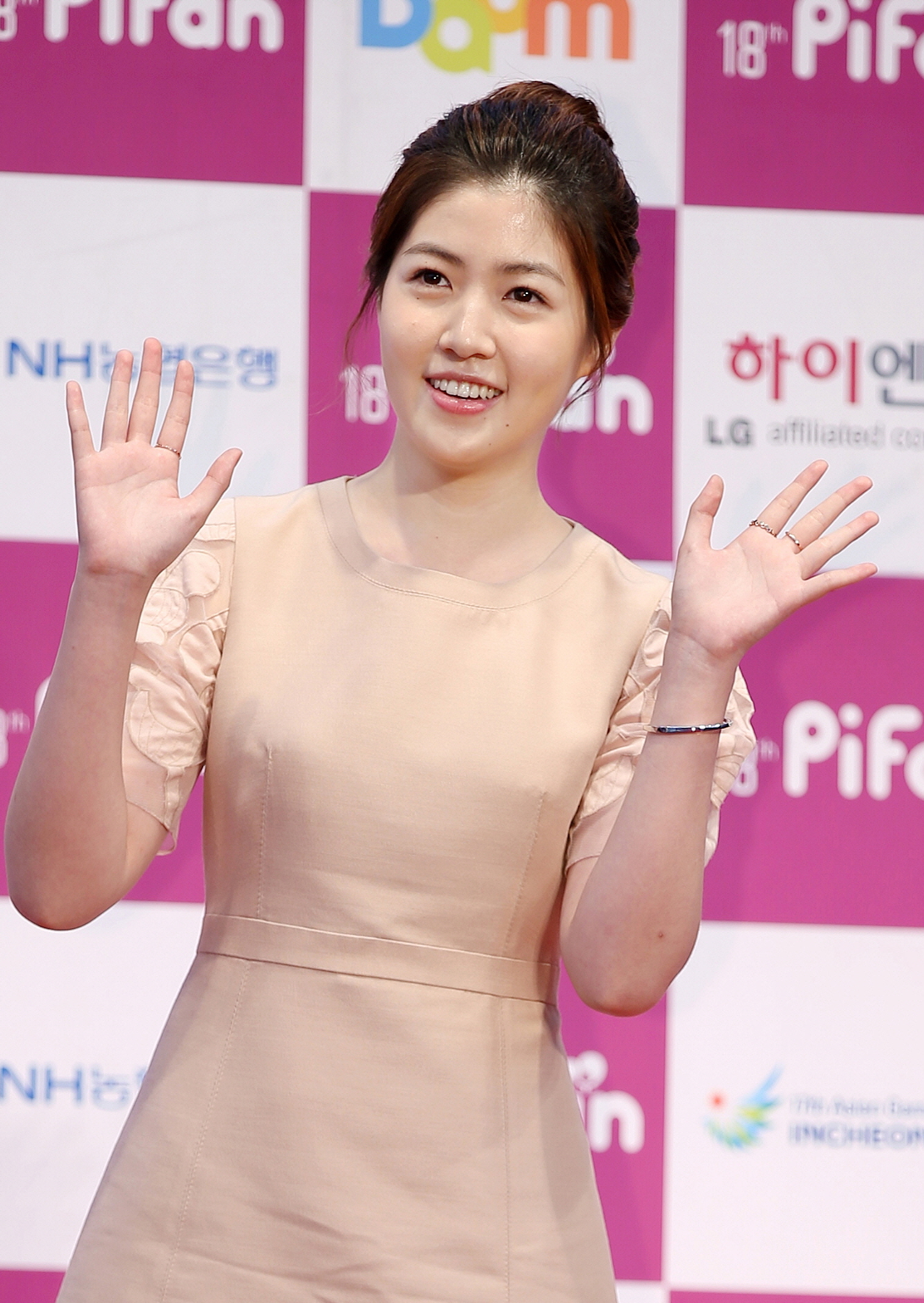
Shim at the 2014 PiFan Film Festival

In the 2014 comedy Miss Granny, Shim played a woman in her 70s who miraculously finds herself back in her 20-year-old body. She said, "This film is quite close to my heart as it is the first film for me to star in not as a child actor, but as full-fledged actress." With 8.65 million admissions, its box office success surpassed Sunny's, proving Shim's ability to carry a film. She also won Best Actress at the Chunsa Film Art Awards, the Baeksang Arts Awards, the Director's Cut Awards, and the Buil Film Awards.

Shim next starred as the eccentric savant pianist heroine in Naeil's Cantabile, a Korean drama adaptation of Japanese manga Nodame Cantabile. However, the series was a critical and commercial flop, and Shim took criticism for her acting in the series.

Shim returned to film, starring in Seoul Station directed by Yeon Sang-ho, who also directed Train to Busan (where she also made a cameo appearance), revenge thriller Missing You, and Queen of Walking, which Shim calls a turning point in her career. In 2017, she starred alongside Ji Chang-wook in the action thriller Fabricated City and alongside Choi Min-shik in the election film The Mayor. In 2018, she starred in The Princess and the Matchmaker, the second installment of the "divining art trilogy" after The Face Reader; and black comedy Psychokinesis.

In 2019, Shim made her Japanese film debut in The Journalist and received positive notices for her performance as a Japanese reporter who looks into a government corruption scandal centered on the Abe administration. She won the Best Actress award at the Mainichi Film Awards, and subsequently the Best Actress award at 43rd Japanese Academy Awards the next year. She also starred in the film Blue Hour, a story of an unusual friendship. She won the Best Actress award at the Takasaki Film Festival for her performance.

In 2020, Shim returned to Korean entertainment with the finance drama Money Game.

In 2022, Shim was invited to sit on the jury bench of the 35th Tokyo International Film Festival.

In May 2023, Shim signed an exclusive contract with PanPare Inc.

== Personal life ==
Shim's hobbies are listening to music, reading science fiction comics, and doing taekwondo. She is the drummer of a band she formed with friends, Chick and Candy.

After graduating from Eonbuk Elementary School and Cheongdam Middle School, Shim temporarily quit acting in 2010 to move to the U.S., explaining, "I chose a place where there aren't a lot of Korean people and decided on a high school in Pittsburgh. Studying is a goal, but I also chose this because I've grown tired mentally and physically after having acted since a young age." She finished her high school at the Professional Children's School in 2013.

She shot a commercial with rocker Seo Taiji in 2008 and played the younger version of Lee Ji-ah's character Sujini in The Legend, but she didn't know that Lee and Seo were secretly married until 2011 when Shim was implicated in rumors that she was Seo and Lee's daughter, which she denied.

Originally nominated for the Best Actress award at the 2011 Grand Bell Awards for her role in Sunny, Shim complained publicly through her Twitter account when the awards committee removed her name from the official list of the nominees after she notified them she could not attend the event because she was then studying in the U.S. She was one of four actors and actresses removed from the initial nomination. Shim ended up winning Best Supporting Actress for her role in Romantic Heaven; Chun Woo-hee, her castmate in Sunny, accepted the honor on Shim's behalf.

== Filmography ==
Key
†	Denotes films that have not yet been released

=== Film ===
Year	Title	Role	Notes	Ref.
2004	Thomas An Jung-geun	An Jung-geun's daughter		
2007	Hansel and Gretel	Kim Young-hee		
2009	Possessed	So-jin		
2010	Happy Killers	Kim Ha-rin		
2010	The Quiz Show Scandal	Kim Yeo-na		
2010	A Night on Earth		Short film	
2011	Earth Rep Rolling Stars	Soo-ji (voice)	Animated film	
2011	Sunny	young Im Na-mi		
2011	Romantic Heaven	young Kim Boon-yi		
2012	Masquerade	Sa-wol		
2014	Miss Granny	Oh Doo-ri		
2016	Sori: Voice From The Heart	Sori (voice)		
2016	Missing You	Hee-joo		
2016	Train to Busan	Runaway Girl	Cameo appearance	
2016	Seoul Station	Daughter (voice)	Animated film	
2016	Queen of Walking	Man-bok		
2017	Fabricated City	Yeo-wool		
2017	The Mayor	Park Kyeong		
2018	Psychokinesis	Roo-mi		
2018	The Princess and the Matchmaker	Princess Songhwa		
2019	The Journalist	Erika Yoshioka		
2019	Blue Hour	Asami Kiyoura		
2020	Fictitious Girl's Diary	So-yeon		
2021	A Garden of Camellias	Nagisa		
2022	7 Secretaries: The Movie	Park Sa-ran		
2024	The Killers		Short film	
2025	Two Seasons, Two Strangers	Lee		
2026	The Table: Day and Night	Hye-jin	Opening film of BIFF	
TBA	Starlight Falls †	Lee Hyeon-jeong (B)		

=== Television series ===
Year	Title	Role	Notes	Ref.
2003	Jewel in the Palace	Saenggaksi		
2004	The Woman Who Wants to Marry	young Lee Shin-young		
2004	Jang Gil-san	young Bong-soon		
2004	Sweet Buns	young Han Ka-ran		
2004	Emperor of the Sea	student under Lady Jung-hwa	Uncredited	
2005	That Summer's Typhoon	Young Kang Soo-min		
2005	Drama City: "Goblins Are Alive"	Ji-won	One act-drama	
2005	I Love You, My Enemy	Kim Ga-ram		
2005	The Secret Lovers			
2005	Lovers in Prague	student in Hangul class	Uncredited	
2006	641 Family	Jin Dal-rae		
2006	Spring Waltz	Young Song Yi-na		
2006	Drama City: "Kkot-nim-yi"	Kkot-nim-yi	One act-drama	
2006	Hwang Jini	Young Hwang Jini		
2007	The Legend	Young Sujini		
2008	Women in the Sun	Young Shin Do-young		
2009	Kyung-sook, Kyung-sook's Father	Jo Kyung-sook		
2009	Hilarious Housewives	Shim Eun-kyung		
2010	The Great Merchant	Young Kim Man-deok		
2010	Bad Guy	Moon Won-in		
2014	Naeil's Cantabile	Seol Nae-il		
2020	7 Secretaries	Park Sa-ran		
2020	Money Game	Lee Hye-joon		
2021	Anonymous: Keishicho "Yubisatsujin" Taisakushitsu"	Kuraki Sena		
2021	Gunjo Ryoiki	Kim Jun-hee		
2023	Why Didn't I Tell You a Million Times?	Song Ha-young		
2025	Queen of Mars	Galle-J0517	Miniseries	
2026	Mad Concrete Dreams	Yona		

=== Web series ===
Year	Title	Role	Notes	Ref.
2023	One Day Off	Lee Jin-sol	Cameo	

=== Hosting ===
Year	Title	Notes	Ref.
2021	44th Japan Academy Film Prize	with Shinichi Hatori	

== Discography ==
Year	Song title	From the Album	Notes
2008		Seo Taiji: Record of the 8th - 398	Narration
2010	"Fly High"	Happy Killers OST	duet with Kim Dong-wook
2014	"If You Go to Los Angeles"	Miss Granny OST	
2014	"White Butterfly"	Miss Granny OST	
2014	"Once More"	Miss Granny OST	
2014	"Raindrop"	Miss Granny OST	
2014	"If You Go to Los Angeles"	Miss Granny OST	with Rose Motel

== Accolades ==
=== Awards and nominations ===
Year	Award	Category	Nominated work	Result	Ref.
2006	KBS Drama Awards	Best Young Actress	Hwang Jini, Kkot-nim-yi	Won	
2008	KBS Drama Awards	Best Young Actress	Women of the Sun	Won	
2009	KBS Drama Awards	Best Young Actress	Kyung-sook, Kyung-sook's Father	Nominated	
2010	31st Blue Dragon Film Awards	Best New Actress	The Quiz Show Scandal	Nominated	
2010	47th Grand Bell Awards	Best New Actress	Happy Killers	Nominated	
2011	47th Baeksang Arts Awards	Best New Actress	Happy Killers	Nominated	
2011	48th Grand Bell Awards	Best Supporting Actress	Romantic Heaven	Won	
2012	48th Baeksang Arts Awards	Best Actress	Sunny	Nominated	
2014	18th Puchon International Fantastic Film Festival	Fantasia Award	—N/a	Won	
2014	KBS Drama Awards	Excellence Award, Actress in a Miniseries	Naeil's Cantabile	Nominated	
2014	50th Baeksang Arts Awards	Best Actress	Miss Granny	Won	
2014	14th Director's Cut Awards	Best Actress	Miss Granny	Won	
2014	19th Chunsa Film Art Awards	Best Actress	Miss Granny	Won	
2014	10th Jecheon International Music & Film Festival	Best Actress	Miss Granny	Won	
2014	23rd Buil Film Awards	Best Actress	Miss Granny	Won	
2014	51st Grand Bell Awards	Best Actress	Miss Granny	Nominated	
2014	35th Blue Dragon Film Awards	Best Actress	Miss Granny	Nominated	
2014	1st Korean Film Producers Association Awards	Best Actress	Miss Granny	Won	
2015	10th Max Movie Awards	Best Actress	Miss Granny	Nominated	
2015	10th Max Movie Awards	Best Supporting Actress	Miss Granny	Nominated	
2016	53rd Grand Bell Awards	Best Actress	Missing You	Nominated	
2019	Tama Cinema Forum Awards	Best New Actress	The Journalist	Won	
2020	39th Zenkoku Eiren Awards	Best Actress	The Journalist	Won	
2020	43rd Japan Academy Film Prize	Best Actress	The Journalist	Won	
2020	74th Mainichi Film Awards	Best Actress	The Journalist	Won	
2020	74th Mainichi Film Awards	Best Supporting Actress	Blue Hour	Nominated	
2020	34th Takasaki Film Festival	Best Actress	Blue Hour	Won	
2025	38th Nikkan Sports Film Awards	Best Actress	Two Seasons, Two Strangers	Nominated	
2026	80th Mainichi Film Awards	Best Lead Performance	Two Seasons, Two Strangers	Nominated	
2026	99th Kinema Junpo Awards	Best Actress	Two Seasons, Two Strangers	Won	
2026	8th Newsis K-Expo Cultural Awards	Seoul Mayor's Award	—N/a	Won	

=== Listicles ===
Name of publisher, year listed, name of listicle, and placement
Publisher	Year	Listicle	Rank	Ref.
Korean Film Council	2021	Korean Actors 200 (Note: Introduces 200 actors that best represent the present and future of Korean cinema to the people in the film industry all over the world.)	Included	
The Screen	2019	2009–2019 Top Box Office Powerhouse Actors in Korean Movies	29th	

=== Other ===
In September 2022, she was appointed to the committee at the 35th Tokyo International Film Festival.
