= Mr. Go (film) =

- China poster
- Hangul: 미스터 고
- RR: Miseuteo Go
- MR: Misŭt'ŏ Ko
- Directed by: Kim Yong-hwa
- Written by: Kim Yong-hwa
- Based on: The 7th Team by Huh Young-man
- Produced by: Yoo Jin-woo
- Starring: Xu Jiao; Sung Dong-il
- Cinematography: Jeon Dae-seong; Park Hyun-cheol
- Edited by: Zino Kim
- Music by: Lee Jae-hak
- Production company: Dexter Films
- Distributed by: Showbox/Mediaplex (South Korea); Huayi Brothers (China)
- Release dates: July 17, 2013 (South Korea); July 18, 2013 (China)
- Running time: 132 minutes
- Countries: South Korea; China
- Languages: Korean; Japanese; Chinese
- Budget: US$18.62 million
- Box office: US$8.65 million (South Korea); US$18.12 million (China)

Mr. Go (Korean: 미스터 고) is a 2013 South Korean sport-comedy film written and directed by Kim Yong-hwa based on Huh Young-man's 1984 comic The 7th Team (제7구단). About a gorilla who becomes a baseball superstar and his 15-year-old female manager, it stars Xu Jiao and Sung Dong-il. Mr. Go was the first South Korean film to be fully shot in 3D. A co-production between South Korea and China, it was released simultaneously in both countries on July 17 and 18, respectively.

== Plot ==
Young circus ringmaster Wei Wei has only bat-swinging gorilla Ling Ling to depend on as her only family member and friend, when her grandfather dies in the Great Sichuan earthquake, leaving behind an insurmountable debt. When a loan shark threatens to sell Ling Ling and the circus kids to cover the debt, Wei Wei has no choice but to allow Ling Ling to be scouted in the Korean Baseball League by the materialistic sports agent Sung. Ling Ling, now dubbed "Mr. Go," becomes an instant hit with fans and leads his team Doosan Bears to a miraculous winning streak.

== Cast ==
- Xu Jiao as Zhao Wei Wei
- Sung Dong-il as Seong Chung-su
- Joe Odagiri as Ito Hiroshi, owner of Chunichi Dragons
- Kim Hee-won as Lin Xiaogang, loan shark
- Kim Kang-woo as Kim, Doosan Bears general manager
- Kim Jung-tae as NC Dinos general manager
- Kim Eung-soo as Jin Yoon-tae, Korea Baseball Organization commissioner
- Jung In-gi as Gong In-gu, KBO secretary-general
- Jo Jae-yoon as Orthopedic doctor
- Kim Heung-rae as Ling Ling/Mr. Go
- Lee Jun-hyeok as Leiting/Zeroz
- Kim Bo-yoon as Sunny
- Kim Gi-cheon as Circus manager
- Kim Go-eun as Xiuni/Sunny, circus orphan
- Kim Ye-won as Zhuni/Junny, circus orphan
- Kim Hong-su as Lin Xiaogang's henchman
- Shin Se-yong as Bamboo tube man
- Na Ju-ho as Fan signal man
- Tamura Hiroto as Inoue Daichi, owner of Yomiuri Giants
- Kim Jeong-seok as Doosan Bears director
- Seong Mun-su as NC Dinos director
- Kim Ji-young as young Weiwei
- Jesse Day as Frederic Pearl, Primate Protection Association representative
- Yun Yuk as Sports commentator
- Kim Hak-ryeong as Sports commentator
- Yu Seung-ho as Sportscaster
- Lee Jae-ho as Sportscaster
- Kim In-woo as Lotte Giants general manager
- Song Min-soo as NC Dinos coach
- Cha Jong-ho as Gang member
- Kim Tae-joon as Judge
- Kim In-cheol as Judge
- Ham Jin-seong as Doosan Bears bench member
- Byun Hee-bong as Weiwei's grandfather
- Han Joon-woo as Reporter
- Ma Dong-seok as Baseball commentator
- Jung Ji-yoon as herself, home-shopping show host
- Kim Jung-eun as herself, TV musical show MC
- Shin-Soo Choo as himself, baseball player
- Hyun-jin Ryu as himself, baseball player
- Kim Sung-joo as himself

== Production ==
Kim Yong-hwa, director of box-office hits 200 Pounds Beauty (2006) and Take Off (2009), decided to adapt Huh Young-man's 28-year-old comic after seeing the YouTube video of Christian the lion, which demonstrated that humans are capable of taming animals. But for the film to work, the gorilla had to look like a living creature. Kim decided to shoot entirely in 3D, and of the 2,000 shots in the film, 1,000 are special effects shots of the gorilla Ling Ling. For four years, a team of more than 500 animators and CG professionals led by visual effects director Jeong Seong-jin developed motion capture technology, facial motion capture technology and a digital fur production program to make the gorilla as realistic as possible, followed by another year of editing. The images were so precise and delicate that all the 3.8 million hairs on Ling Ling could sway with the wind.

With consultant Kim Tae-yong of Rhythm and Hues Studios (famous for its work on Life of Pi), the production team established a new company Dexter Studios (with 180 employees), which created the software Zelos System to process large amounts of data efficiently so that the film cost 10 percent of the budget demanded by most Hollywood movies. The budget was ₩20 billion (or US$18.62 million), with ₩12 billion spent on visual effects. 25% of the budget (or US$5 million) came from Chinese investor Huayi Brothers. It also received ₩30 million from the International Co-Production Incentive Support 2013, a project run by the Korean Film Council (KOFIC), and director Kim spent ₩3 billion from his own pocket.

== Music ==
The movie's theme song "Bye" was sung by Kim Tae-yeon, a member of Girls' Generation. Composed by music director Lee Jae-hak, "Bye" had a Korean version and a Chinese version. The score was recorded by the Hollywood Symphony Orchestra at Sony Pictures' Scoring Stage in Los Angeles, CA.

== Release ==
The film opened on 1,000 screens in South Korea on July 17, 2013, and on 5,000 screens (all in 3D) in China on July 18. It was also released in other Asian countries, namely Singapore on July 25, Malaysia and Thailand on August 1, Indonesia on August 6, Taiwan on August 9, Hong Kong on August 15, and the Philippines on October 16.

== Box office ==
Due to competition with other summer blockbusters such as The Wolverine, Snowpiercer and The Terror Live, Mr. Go had a disappointing box-office performance on its opening weekend in South Korea, drawing 540,411 moviegoers at 788 screens. It grossed a total of ₩9,311,311,000 (US$8.65 million) domestically on 1,325,039 tickets sold.

In China, the film topped the box office on its opening day, earning CN¥12.2 million, which is the highest single-day record for a Korean film in the country. It grossed a total of CN¥112.73 million (US$18.12 million) in China.

== Awards and nominations ==
Year	Award	Category	Recipient	Result
2013	22nd Buil Film Awards	Best Art Direction	Yang Hong-sam	Nominated
2013	34th Blue Dragon Film Awards	Best Art Direction	Yang Hong-sam	Nominated
2013	34th Blue Dragon Film Awards	Technical Award	Jeong Seong-jin	Won
2013	33rd Korean Association of Film Critics Awards	Best Technical Achievement	Jeong Seong-jin	Won
2014	19th Chunsa Film Art Awards	Technical Award	Jeong Seong-jin	Won
2014	8th Asian Film Awards	Best Visual Effects	Jeong Seong-jin	Won
