= Missing You (2016 film) =

- Poster
- Hangul: 널 기다리며
- RR: Neol gidarimyeo
- MR: Nŏl kidarimyŏ
- Directed by: Mo Hong-jin
- Screenplay by: Mo Hong-jin
- Release date: March 10, 2016
- Running time: 108 minutes
- Country: South Korea
- Language: Korean
- Box office: US$4.6 million

Missing You (Korean: 널 기다리며) is a 2016 South Korean revenge psychological thriller film written and directed by Mo Hong-jin. It was released in South Korea on March 10, 2016.

== Plot ==
When Hee-Joo (Shim Eun-Kyung) was 7-years-old her father was murdered. Her father worked as a detective and was working on a serial killer case. The killer, Ki-Bum (Kim Sung-Oh), was eventually arrested, but found guilty for only one murder. 15 years later, Ki-Bum is released from prison. Detective Dae-Young (Yoon Je-Moon) worked on the original case with Hee-Joo's father and he has not given up getting a murder conviction for his former partner. Meanwhile, Hee-Joo has waited patiently for Gi-beom's release.

== Cast ==
- Shim Eun-kyung as Hee-joo
- Yoon Je-moon as Dae-yeong
- Kim Sung-oh as Gi-beom

== Reception ==
On its second weekend in South Korea, the film was fourth placed, with US$1 million.

== Awards and nominations ==
Year	Award	Category	Recipient	Result
2016	53rd Grand Bell Awards	Best Actress	Shim Eun-kyung	Nominated
2016	53rd Grand Bell Awards	Best New Director	Mo Hong-jin	Nominated
