= Ye Soo-jung =

South Korean actress (born 1955)

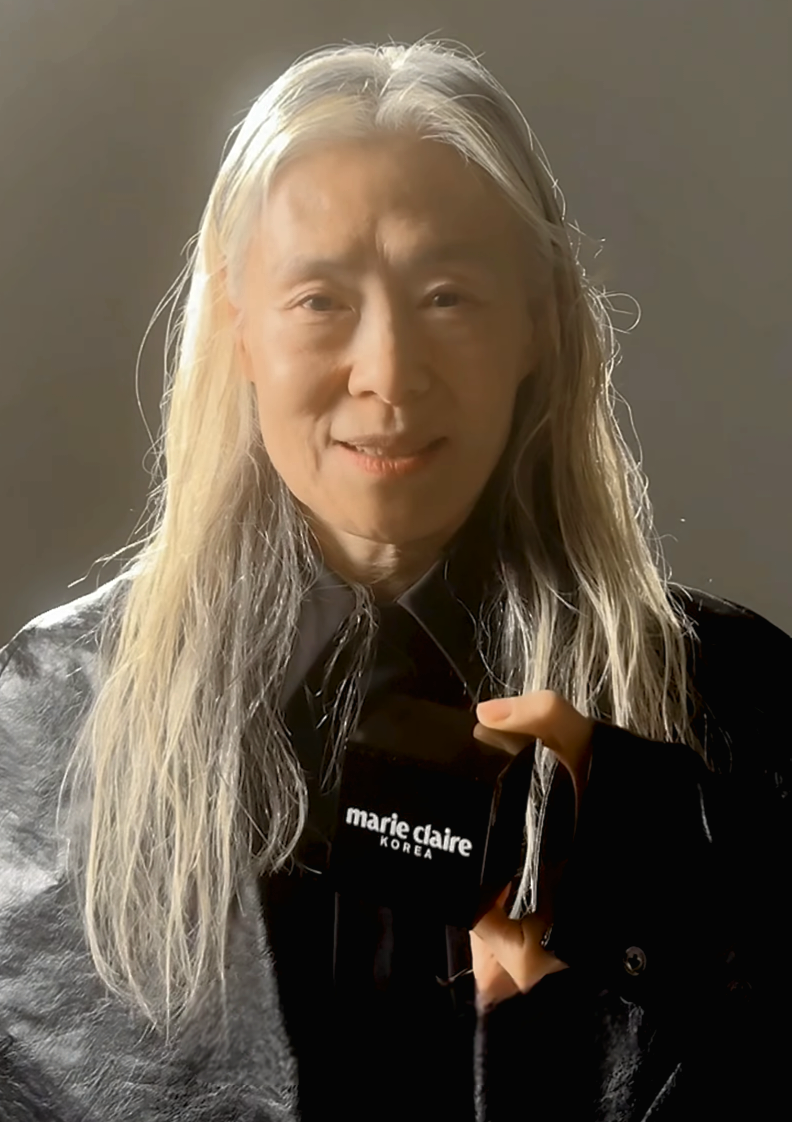
- Ye in February 2025
- Born: Kim Soo-jung; 25 March 1955 (age 71); Pyeongtaek, South Korea
- Other name: Ye Su-jeong
- Education: Korea National University of Arts (Bachelor and Master Degree in German Language & Literature); LMU Munich (Master Degree in Theater)
- Occupation: Actress
- Years active: 1973–present
- Agent(s): S&A Entertainment
- Known for: The King of Tears, Lee Bang-won; Link: Eat, Love, Kill; Do You Like Brahms?
- Spouse: Kim Chang-hwa (m. 1980)
- Children: Kim Ye-na (daughter) and a son
- Parent: Jeong Ae-ran (mother)
- Relatives: Kim Soo-ok (sister); Han Jin-hee (brother-in-law)

Korean name
- Hangul: 김수정
- Hanja: 金秀貞
- RR: Gim Sujeong
- MR: Kim Sujŏng

Stage name
- Hangul: 예수정
- Hanja: 芮秀貞
- RR: Ye Sujeong
- MR: Ye Sujŏng

Ye Soo-jung (Korean: 예수정; born on 25 March 1955) is a South Korean actress. In 1979, she made her debut in the play A Woman Named Solitude, and she presented a well-balanced and solid performance with her solid interpretive skills and broad perspectives that she developed while studying abroad in Germany. She has appeared in numerous stage productions such as Long Day's Journey into Night, Gift of Gorgon, The Cherry Orchard, Widows, Green Bench, Guest, Hanako, Death of a Salesman, I Am You, Hwajeonga, and Agnes of God.

She has been called the godmother of the theater world. She has garnered prestigious awards in the theater industry, including the Hi-seo Theater Award, Kim Dong-hoon Theater Award, Dong-A Theater Award for Best Actress, Seoul Theater Festival Acting Award, and Lee Hae-rang Theater Award, showcasing her skill and expertise as an actress.

In the 2000s, she expanded her activities to the film and TV drama industry. She left a lasting impression on the public through numerous films, including Tunnel, Sea Fog, The Client, The Thieves, Train to Busan, and Along with the Gods: The Two Worlds, which attracted over 10 million viewers, as well as hit dramas like Secret Forest, Do You Like Brahms?, Mine, Search: WWW, and One the Woman, where she appeared as a supporting role. In 2018, she won the Best Supporting Actress award at the Seoul Awards for her role in Along with the Gods: The Two Worlds, and in 2020, she received the "Female Film of the Year" award for her first leading role in the film 69 Years Old.

Ye's most recent TV works include: The King of Tears, Lee Bang-won, Link: Eat, Love, Kill, and Becoming Witch., and she also starred in the MBC four-part series Wild Boar Hunting and made special appearance in Revenant.

== Early life and education ==
Ye Soo-jung was born as Kim Soo-jeong in March 1955 in Jongno, Seoul, South Korea. Ye attended Susong Elementary School, Soongui Girls' Middle School and High School. In 1973, she enrolled in Departement of German Literature of Korea National University of Arts.

== Career ==
When studying from Korea National University of Arts with a degree in German Literature, She watched film The Godfather and extremely impressed by Marlon Brando's acting which made her want to try acting too. After that, Ye joined a theater class at the German Cultural Center Above the Theater and started acting secretly. Later she encounter works of German playwright Bertolt Brecht. Knowing Brecht's words, "Theater is a space for civic enlightenment," Jung thought, "Oh, it's really wonderful to live here (theater) all my life."

In 1975, Ye acted in Arthur Miller's play Broken Glass (play). Followed by Henrik Ibsen's play Ghosts produced by Korea University Theatre Arts Research Society (고려대학교 극예술연구회).

After graduating from university, she worked as a German tutor and editor-in-chief of the Full Gospel Church magazine to earn pocket money while acting in plays. Ye debuted professionally onstage in 1979 with Han Tae-suk's play A Woman Named Solitude. After watching play A Woman Named Solitude, Yoo Deok-Hyung (director, former chairman of the Seoul Institute of the Arts) scouted her for his work When Spring Comes to the Mountains and Fields. One day, Yoo noticed that Ye, who participated in his practice, was acting without her mother's Jeong Ae-ran permission. "You can't do that," he said and Yoo went to her house and to ask Jeong personally, Jeong said to her, "Do it with a guarantee."

After this play Ye got married and went to Germany with her husband. In 1984, Ye decided to study theater in Graduate School at LMU Munich. After she was back to South Korea, Ye worked in Customer Call Center for two years.

Ye was only active in films since 2003. She has done minor and supporting roles mostly as mother. Her most notable supporting role was in the film Along with the Gods: The Two Worlds, which was released in 2017. She reprised her role in the sequel Along with the Gods: The Last 49 Days.

Her most notable role was in Lim Seon-a's film An Old Lady, as 69-year-old Hyo-jeong. She is sexually assaulted by a 29-year-old male nurse while receiving treatment at a hospital. She reports it to the police, but faces society's prejudice because she is an elderly person! a dementia patient. The court, considers the elderly woman to be asexual and dismisses the arrest warrant, saying that there is insufficient probability that a young man would do such a thing. With this role Ye gained critical acclaim, She was nominated for several Best Actress award and won the 21st 'Female Filmmaker of the Year' for this film.

When I read the scenario, it felt unique but rather realistic. Do old people really live like that? I've seen a lot of unfamiliar scenes that raise questions. Isn't it hard to look into the inside of our mothers, aunts, and grandmothers? When you reach that age, you hide well in reality. This work calmly reveals that hidden thing.

— Ye Soo-jung on Film An Old Lady, Harper Bazaar Korea Interview

== Personal life ==
Soo-jung is the daughter of Jeong Ae-ran who was a popular actress of 50s, 60s and 70s. She is the sister-in-law of actor Han Jin-hee who has married her sister Kim Soo-ok.

Ye married Kim Chang-hwa in 1980 after completing the play When Spring Comes to the Mountains and Fields. Ye gave birth to a daughter (currently an actress and theater director Kim Ye-na) in 1982 and left to study at LMU Munich in Germany with her husband in 1984. In 1986, a son was born. During their 8-year stay in Germany, her husband received a doctorate in theater theory and Ye completed a master's degree in theater theory. They returned in 1991.

== Filmography ==
=== Film ===
Year	Title		Role	Note	Ref.
Year	English	Korean	Role	Note	Ref.
2003	Save the Green Planet!	지구를 지켜라!	Byung-goo's mother		
2006	Shin Sung-il is Lost	신성일의 행방불명	Director		
2007	Epitaph	기담	Director of Ansang hospital		
2007	Shadows in the Palace	궁녀	Queen Mother		
2009	Like You Know It All	잘 알지도 못하면서	Mother of actress		
2009	Secret	시크릿	Ji-yeon's mother		
2011	Detective K: Secret of the Virtuous Widow	조선명탐정: 각시투구꽃의 비밀	Im's wife		
2011	The Client	의뢰인	Jung-ah's mother		
2012	Hand in Hand	해로	Hee-jung		
2012	The Thieves	도둑들	Tiffany		
2014	Sea Fog	해무	Dong-shik's grandmother		
2015	Cancelled Faces	마이 올드 프렌드	Mother		
2016	Train to Busan	부산행	In-gil		
2016	Tunnel	터널	Old mother		
2016	The Bacchus Lady	죽여주는 여자	Bok-hee		
2017	The Cage		Nick's mother		
2017	Along with the Gods: The Two Worlds	신과함께: 죄와 벌	Ja-hong's mother		
2018	Psychokinesis	염력	Mr. Jung's older sister		
2018	Herstory	허스토리	Park Soon-nyeo		
2018	The Land of Happiness	행복의 나라	Hee-ja		
2018	Along with the Gods: The Last 49 Days	신과함께-인과 연	Soo-hong's mother		
2019	Mal-Mo-E: The Secret Mission	말모이	Madame Jo	Special appearance	
2019	Kim Ji-young: Born 1982	82년생 김지영	Kim Ji-young's mother		
2020	Intruder	침입자	Yoon-hee		
2020	Again	어게인	Han Mal-soon		
2020	An Old Lady	69세	Shim Hyo Jung		
2021	New Year Blues	새해전야	Oh Hye-sim		
2021	The Prayer	간호중	Nurse Sabina		
2023	Project Silence	사일런스	Soon-ok		
2024	The Desperate Chase	필사의 추격	Chairperson Yoo		
2025	People and Meat	사람과 고기	Hwa-jin		
2026	Beach Fictions	그날의 태주		Premiere at 2026 BIFF	

=== Television series ===
Television drama appearances
Year	Title		Role	Note	Ref.
Year	English	Korean	Role	Note	Ref.
2006	Someday	썸데이	Gumiko		
2007	Prince Hours	궁S	Han Sang-gong		
2013	The End of the World	세계의 끝	Na-hyun's mother		
2015	Heard It Through the Grapevine	풍문으로 들었소	Joo-young's mother		
2016	On the Way to the Airport	공항가는 길	Go Eun-hee		
2016	Listen to Love	이번 주, 아내가 바람을 핍니다	Hyun-woo's mother		
2016	My Old Friend	마이 올드 프렌드	Ae-sim		
2017	Innocent Defendant	피고인	Myung Geum-ja		
2017	Stranger	비밀의 숲	Park Soo-sung's mother		
2017	Strongest Deliveryman	최강 배달꾼	Jung-im		
2017	Prison Playbook	슬기로운 감빵생활	Park Seon-ja		
2017	Untouchable	언터처블	Park Young-sook		
2018	Mother	마더	Clara		
2018	Suits	슈츠	Yoon-woo's grandmother		
2018	SF8	에스 에프 에잇	Sabina		
2018	The Ghost Detective	오늘의 탐정	Da-il's mother		
2018	Twelve Nights	열두밤	Lee Ri		
2018	Top Star U-back	톱스타 유백이	Kang-soon's mother		
2019	Search: WWW	검색어를 입력하세요 WWW	Jang Hee-eun		
2019	The Lies Within	모두의 거짓말	Coroner		
2019	Black Dog: Being A Teacher	블랙독	Yoon Yeo-hwa		
2020	The Game: Towards Zero	더 게임: 0시를 향하여	Mrs. Jeong		
2020	A Piece of Your Mind	반의 반	Eun Soo-jung		
2020	Do You Like Brahms?	브람스를 좋아하세요?	Na Moon-sook		
2021	Mine	마인	Mother Emma		
2021	One the Woman	원 더 우먼	Kim Kyung-shin		
2021	Jirisan	지리산	Geum-ri		
2021	The King of Tears, Lee Bang-won	태종 이방원	Queen Sinui		
2022	Link: Eat, Love, Kill	링크: 먹고 사랑하라, 죽이게	Na Chun-ok		
2022	Insider	인사이더	Shin Dal-soo		
2022	The Fabulous	더 패뷸러스	Pyo Ji-eun's grandmother		
2022	Becoming Witch	마녀는 살아있다	Oh lak-eul		
2022	Hunted	멧돼지 사냥	Ok-soon		
2023	Revenant	악귀	Kim Seok-ran		
2023	The Worst of Evil	최악의 악	Yoon Won-gil		
2023	Maestra: Strings of Truth	마에스트라	Bae Jeong-hwa		
2024	Dog Knows Everything	개소리	Ye Soo-jung		
2024	When the Silver Bell Rings	실버벨이 울리면	Park Soo-hyang		

== Theater ==
=== Amateur ===
Amateur theater play performance(s)
Year	Title		Role	Venue	Date	Ref.
Year	English	Korean	Role	Venue	Date	Ref.
1973	Broken Jar	깨어진 항아리		A club belonging to the German Cultural Centre in Korea Freie Buehne A public performance		
1975	Ghost	유령	Mrs. Helen Alving	Ancient Audiovisual Education Room (Clock Tower Building Korea University of Arts)	November 28–30	
1975	The Great Wall	만리장성	Mother	Sogang University Theater	June 13–15	
1976	Macbeth	맥베드	Lady Macbeth	Korea University of Arts Auditorium	June 13–15	
1976	The Glass Menagerie	유리동물원				
1977	Where and what will we meet again?	어디서 무엇이 되어 다시 만나랴				
1978	Prince Popo and Princess Phi Phi	포포왕자와 피피공주	Tutor	Theater Hall Cecil Theater Directed by Go Geum-seok	June 14–20	

=== Professional ===
Professional theater play performance(s)
Year	Title		Role	Theater	Date	Ref.
Year	English	Korean	Role	Theater	Date	Ref.
1979	A Women Named Solitude	고독이란 이름의 여인	Solitude	—N/a	—N/a	
1979	When Spring Comes to the Mountains and Fields	봄이 오면 산에 들에	Wild rocambole	—N/a	—N/a	
1980	When Spring Comes to the Mountains and Fields	봄이 오면 산에 들에	Wild rocambole	Directing Yoo Deok-hyung		
1983	Layered Story	겹괴기담		Cultural Arts Promotion Agency Arts Theater Small Theater	May 17–24	
1983	Danton's Death	당통의 죽음	Woman	Culture and Art Hall small theater, directed by Kim Chang-hwa	April 12–23	
1983	River of History	역사의 강	Sam-hui	Culture and Art Hall Grand theater, directed by Kim Chang-hwa	July 22–28	
1989	Division of the soul	영혼의 분열		Theatre Company Munich Unter Dem Baum		
1991	The Effect of Gamma Rays on Man-in-the-Moon Marigolds	감마선은 달무늬진 금잔화에 어떤 영향을 미쳤는가?		Theatre company Seongshim Original fish theatre performance		
1992	Last Report for Freedom - (Original Title: Death of the Black Seagull)	자유를 위한 마지막 보고서 - (원제: 검은 갈매기의 죽음)		Culture and Art Hall Small Theater	March 22 – April 8	
1993	Riding together	동승		Theatre Company Shinhyup, directing		
1993	Light up	빛보라		Directing a special performance for the 90th anniversary of Sungui Girls' High School		
1993	The death of a rich man	어떤 부자의 죽음		Directing a charity performance to help the disabled in the theatre company Yesori		
1994	Death of a Salesman	세일즈맨의 죽음	Linda Roman	Culture and Art Hall Small Theater	May 3 – June 30	
1995	King Lear	리어왕	Dramaturgy research	Culture and Arts Center Grand Theater	March 23–28	
1995	Women in Crisis	위기의 여자	daughter, friend, doctor	Small Theater Sanwoolim, directed by Lim Young-woong	August 17 – October 8	
1996	Face behind Face	얼굴 뒤의 얼굴	Lee Ji-yeon	Seoul Arts Center Jayu Small Theater	February 22 – March 31	
1996	32 years of King Sejong	세종 32년	Sejong-bi	National Gugak Centre from main theatre, the music hall, directed by Han Tae-sook	November 22 – December 2	
1997	Death of a Salesman	세일즈맨의 죽음	Linda Roman	Theatre Company Shinhyup, directed by Lee Jong-hwan		
1997	Father	아버지	Young Shin	Sejong Center for the Performing Arts small auditorium, directed by Pyo Jae-soon	July 5–27	
1998	Road to Mecca	메카로 가는 길	Elsa	Constellation Small Theatre, Directed by Park Cheol-wan	July 2 – August 2	
1998	Shopalovic's Traveling Theater	쇼팔로비치 유랑극단	Instructor	Culture and Art Hall Small Theater	December 4–8	
1999	Orestes Trilogy	오레스테스 3부작		Dumul Workshop, Directed by Song Seon-ho	March 4–14	
1999	Na Un-gyu	나운규	Jo Jung-ok	Culture Art Hall Small Theater, directing Han Tae-sook	May 6–23	
1999	Media waltz	메디아 왈츠		Theater Laboratory 1 Hyehwa-dong, Directed by Son Jung-woo	November 26 – December 19	
2000	The Lady from the Sea	바다의 여인		Culture Art Hall Grand Theater Directed by Robert Wilson	August 27 – September 3	
2001	The Name of Oedipus - The Song of the Forbidden Body	오이디푸스의 이름 - 금지된 육체의 노래	Queen	Seoul Art Center Jayu Theater, Directed by Jang Yoon-kyung	March 13–18	
2001	The woman's little theory of happiness	그 여자의 작은 행복론	female doctor	Small Theater Sanwoolim	October 30 – November 25	
2001	The story of a soldier	병사의 이야기		Dumul Workshop, Direction		
2002	Long Journey into The Night	밤으로의 긴 여로	Mary	Theatre Company Independence Theatre, Directed by Choi Beom-soon		
2003	The Gift of the Gorgon	고곤의 선물	Helen Dawson	Dongsoong Art Center Grand Theater	November 30	
2003	19 and 80	19 그리고 80	Cheyson	Jeongmiso Small Theater, Directing Jang Doo-i	January 9 – March 16	
2003	Sea and Parasol	바다와 양산	Kim Jeong-sook	Arungguji Theater in Daehangno		
2004	The Cherry Orchard	벚꽃동산	Madame Lyubov Andreievna Ranevskaya	Dongguk University Arts Theater	March 1–10	
2004	Ah! Nanseolheon-That Beautiful Promise	아! 난설헌-그 아름다운 기약	Heo Nan-seol-heon	Stargazing at the National Gugak Center	May 7–9	
2004	Sea and Parasol	바다와 양산	Kim Jeong-sook	Arungguji Theater in Daehangno	September 9–26	
2005	Green Bench	고양이늪	Haruyama Taiko (Hester Swayne)	Cultural Arts Promotion Agency Arts Theater Small Theater	May 18–22	
2005	Customer	손님		Arko Arts Center Theater, Directed by Yoon Kwang-jin	December 2–11	
2005	The story of an old couple	늙은 부부 이야기	Lee Jom-sun	Daehakro Small Theater	December 29 – January 1	
2006	Green Bench	고양이늪	Haruyama Taiko (Hester Swayne)	Arko Arts Theater Small Theater	February 23 – March 12	
2006	Dream of Autumn	가을날의 꿈	Wife	Arunguji Theater Daehakro, Directed by Song Seon-ho	July 7–30	
2007	Doubt	다우트	Sister Eloise, Director.	Hakjeon Blue Small Theater, Directed by Choi Yong-hoon	February 23 – April 3	
2007	Sea and Parasol	바다와 양산	Kim Jung-sook	Theatre Company Wandering Line, Directed by Song Seon-ho	June 24 – July 30	
2007	Agnes of God	신의 아그네스	Director Miriam's Sister	Seoul Art Center Jayu Theater, Directed by Yoon Kwang-jin	December 8–30	
2008–2009	Good night mom	잘자요 엄마	Telma	wonder Space Nemo Theater Moon Sam-hwa	August 39 – January 4	
2009	30th Seoul Theater Festival: Sound of the Organ	(제30회) 서울연극제: 풍금소리	Lee Gil-rye	Arko Arts Theater Grand Theater, Directed by Yoon Kwang-jin	March 2–6	
2009–2010	Mom, do you want to go travelling?	엄마, 여행갈래요?	Kwon Soon-hee	Baekam Art Hall in Samseong-dong, Seoul, Directing Ryu Jang-ha	November 17 – January 17	
2010	Marvellous Trip	기묘여행	the victim's mother	Arko Arts Theater Small Theater, directed by Ryu Joo-yeon	April 20 – May 22	
2010	There is No Sleepless Night	잠 못 드는 밤은 없다	Ikuko	Doosan Art Center Space111, Directed by Park Geun-hyung	May 11 – June 6	
2010	Road to Mecca	메카로 가는 길	Helen	Daehak-ro Arts Theatre Grand Theatre until the 22nd, Directed by Song Seon-ho	August 6–22	
2011	There is No Sleepless Night	잠 못 드는 밤은 없다	Ikuko	Doosan Art Center Space111, Directed by Park Geun-hyung	November 29 – December 31	
2012	The Widows	과부들	Sophia Fuentés	Arko Arts Theater Grand Theater	June 1–10	
2012	Molly Sweeney	몰리 스위니	Molly Sweeney	Mimaji Art Center Snow Theater	September 3–9	
2012	Long Journey into The Night	밤으로의 긴 여로	Mary	Myeongdong Arts Theater	October 12 – November 11	
2014	The Widows	과부들	Sophia	Arko Arts Theater Grand Theater	March 14–23	
2014–2015	I Am You	나는 너다	Jo Maria	BBCH Hall, Gwanglim Art Center	November 27 – January 31	
2015	Korea University Theater, 110th anniversary performance 'Cherry Blossom Orchard'	고대극회, 개교 110주년 기념공연 '벚꽃동산'	Madame Lyubov Andreievna Ranevskaya	Sejong Center for the Performing Arts M Theater	August 25–30	
2015–2016	Hanako	하나코	One person (Hanako)	Arko Arts Theater Small Theater	December 24 – January 10	
2016	Death of a Salesman	세일즈맨의 죽음	Linda Roman	Seoul Arts Center's CJ Towol Theater	April 25 – May 8	
2017	Hanako	하나코	One person (Hanako)	Daehakro Space Owl	Feb 7–19	
2017	Death of a Salesman	세일즈맨의 죽음	Linda Roman	Seoul Arts Center CJ Towol Theater	April 12–30	
2017	(2017) SPAF Seoul International Performing Arts Festival: White Rabbit Red Rabbit <Lee Ho-jae>	(2017) SPAF 서울국제공연예술제: 하얀 토끼 빨간 토끼 <이호재>	herself	Arko Arts Theater small theater	September 24	
2018	Electra — Directed by Han Tae-Suk	한태숙 연출 엘렉트라	Chorus-Diana	LG Art Center	April 26 – May 5	
2019	Ensemble de Fabio Marra	앙상블	Isabella	Small Theater Samwoonlim	September – October 20	
2019–2020	Mary Jane	메리 제인	Rudy, TenK	Hongik University Daehangno Art Center Small Theater	Dec 7 – Jan 19	
2020	Slasher	화전가	Ms. Kim	Myeongdong Art Center	August 8–30	
2021	Buried Child	파묻힌 아이	Halley	Gyeonggi Art Centre Small Theatre	May 27 – June 6	

== Accolades ==
=== Awards and nominations ===
Award and nominations received by Ye Soo-jung
Year	Award ceremony	Category	Work	Result	Ref.
2004	5th Kim Dong-hoon Theater Award (Note: The Kim Dong-hoon Theater Award (김동훈 연극상에) was established in 2000 to honor Kim Dong-hoon (1939–1996), a theater director and theater actor. Kim Dong-hoon, who studied aesthetics at Gyeonggi High School and Seoul National University, and worked in the theater company's experimental theater, left his mark in Korean theater as an actor, director, theater troupe operator, and theater administrator.)	Best Actress	—N/a	Won	
2005	41st Dong-A Theater Awards (Note: The Dong-A Theater Awards (동아연극상) established in 1964 to expand and develop the base of Korean theater, have contributed to the revitalization of Korean theater by selecting and awarding performers, theater troupes and organizations that have performed outstandingly every year.)	Best New Actress	The Cherry Orchard	Won	
2005	26th Seoul Theater Festival	Acting Award	Green Bench	Won	
2005	10th Hi-seo Theater Awards (Note: The Hi-seo Theater Awards (히서연극상) was established in 1996 by theatre critic Gu Hee-seo (구히서) (1939 to 2019). In 1996, the first year started with the Theatre of the Year Award. Since 1997, two winners were selected, one each for The Theater Man of the Year and The Theatre Award. Winners were given plaques and prizes funded from The Metaa wine party auction that takes place a month before the awards ceremony. The last award ceremony was in 2015.)	Best Actress	—N/a	Won	
2006	1st Korean Female Performer Award	Best Acting Award	Sea and Parasol; Green Bench	Won	
2012	32nd Best Artist of the Year Award	Best Actress in Theater	—N/a	Won	
2017	27th Lee Hae-rang Theater Award (Note: The Lee Hae-rang Theater Award was established by the Lee Hae-rang Theater Foundation to commemorate the Lee Hae-rang, a pioneer in the Korean theater industry.)	Best Actress	—N/a	Won	
2018	22nd Bucheon International Fantastic Film Festival	Best Actress Award	The Land of Happiness	Won	
2018	22nd The Seoul Awards	Best Supporting Actress in Film	Along with the Gods: The Last 49 Days	Won	
2021	57th Baeksang Art Awards	Best Actress in Film	An Old Lady	Nominated	
2021	Buil Film Awards	Best Actress	An Old Lady	Nominated	
2021	21st Female Film Actor of the Year Award for Acting Award	Best Actress	An Old Lady	Won	
2021	2021 Chunsa Film Art Awards	Best Actress	An Old Lady	Nominated	
2022	Director's Cut Awards	Best New Actress	An Old Lady	Nominated	
2022	2022 MBC Drama Awards	Best Supporting Actress	Hunted	Won	
2026	Korean Association of Film Critics Awards	Best Supporting Actress	People and Meat	Won	

=== Listicles ===
Name of publisher, year listed, name of listicle, and placement
Publisher	Year	Listicle	Placement	Ref.
Korean Film Council	2021	Korean Actors 200 (Note: The list introduces the 200 actors that best represent the present and future of Korean cinema to the people in the film industry all over the world.)	Placed	
