= Happy Killers =

- Theatrical poster
- Hangul: 반가운 살인자
- RR: Bangaun sarinja
- MR: Pan'gaun sarinja
- Directed by: Kim Dong-wook
- Written by: Kim Dong-wook
- Based on: Happy Killers by Seo Mi-ae
- Produced by: Kim Hyun-shin; Eo Ji-yeon
- Starring: Kim Dong-wook; Yu Oh-seong; Shim Eun-kyung
- Cinematography: Lee Ki-won
- Edited by: Kim Chang-ju; Steve M. Choe
- Music by: Lee Hyeong-ju; Gang Hak-seon
- Distributed by: Lotte Entertainment
- Release date: 8 April 2010
- Running time: 107 minutes
- Country: South Korea
- Language: Korean
- Box office: US$3,799,385

Happy Killers (Korean: 반가운 살인자; RR: Bangaun sarinja) is a 2010 South Korean comedy-thriller film. It was adapted from a mystery short story of the same title written by Seo Mi-ae in 2005.

== Plot ==
Jung-min is the new detective assigned to a neighborhood where a serial killer commits murder every rainy Thursday. Laidback and blundering at his job, Jung-min is actually secretly studying for a civil servant exam to get away from his boss who's always picking on him. Every day, residents protest outside the police station, shouting that the police should make up for the falling apartment prices and catch the murderer. To make matters worse, Jung-min's mother who happens to be the president of the women's association is leading the protest. He vows to catch the killer this time in order to save his dignity as a detective and a son. However, his elaborate plans are upset by the appearance of Young-seok, the neighborhood unemployed bum. Because of the reward for the killer's capture, Young-seok is trying to catch him well, and his natural detective skills lead him to always arrive at the crime scene one step ahead of the police. Furthermore, he criticizes every little thing that Jung-min does and is a royal pain in the neck. Jung-min absolutely cannot let Young-seok solve the case and take away his chance of a lifetime, so a rivalry forms between the two as they both race to catch the killer.

== Cast ==
- Kim Dong-wook as Detective Choi Jung-min
- Yu Oh-seong as Kim Young-seok
- Shim Eun-kyung as Kim Ha-rin, Young-seok's daughter
- Kim Eung-soo as Team leader
- Kim Seon-hyuk as Detective Im
- Lee Mi-do as Jjookkoomi ("webfoot octopus")
- Han Seong-sik as Distributor
- Jin Kyung as Mi-young
- Lee Jae-gu as Young-seok's friend
- Lee Yul as Yi-kyung
- Jeong Jong-yeol as Detective 1
- Jeong Mi-seong as Detective 2
- Lee Ho-yeon as Detective 3
- Shin Jeong-min as Player 1
- Baek Eun-kyeong as Player 2
- Lee Soo-jin as Player 3
- Lee Myeong-ho as Jae-won
- Kim Ri-ah as First victim
- Lee Jang-mi as Second victim
- Kim Mi-yeong as Third victim
- Jo Kyeong-sook as Small store owner
- Kwon Oh-jin as Drunkard
- Tak Seong-eun as Nurse
- Jeon Seong-ae as Adviser for studying abroad
- Kim Ji-eun as Homeroom teacher
- Kim Jeong-sik as Teacher 1
- Shin Hye-jeong as Teacher 2
- Oh Ki-hwan as Apartment security guard
- Kim Kang-woo as Male demonstrator 1
- Choi In-soo as Male demonstrator 2
- Kim Mi-joon as Female demonstrator 1
- Jeong Mi-hye as Female demonstrator 2
- Kwon Beom-taek as Chief of police
- Seong Hyeon-joon as Criminal psychologist
- Son Kyeong-min as Pretty boy in adult entertainment district
- Heo Haeng-wook as Convenience store worker
- Kim Tae-hyeong as Delivery worker
- Ok Ja-yeong as Weather forecaster
- Ryoo Sang-woo as Scooter man
- Kim Hyo-je as Airport security worker
- Oh Yeon-seo as Magazine model
- Sung Ji-ru as Taxi driver (cameo)
- Song Ok-sook as Jung-min's mother (cameo)

== Reception ==
Shim Eun-kyung received Best New Actress nominations at the 47th Grand Bell Awards in 2010 and the 47th Baeksang Arts Awards in 2011.
