= Sung Dong-il =

South Korean actor (born 1967)

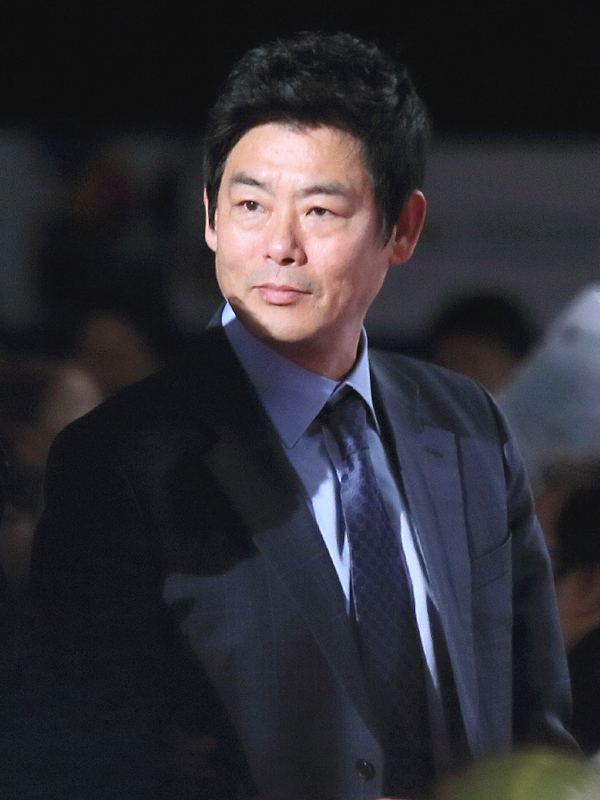
- Sung in 2015
- Born: April 27, 1967 (age 59); Incheon, South Korea
- Education: Yuhan University (Mechanical Design)
- Occupation: Actor
- Years active: 1987–present
- Agent: Star Entertainment
- Spouse: Park Kyung-hye (m. 2003)
- Children: 3

Korean name
- Hangul: 성동일
- Hanja: 成東鎰
- RR: Seong Dongil
- MR: Sŏng Tongil

Sung Dong-il (Korean: 성동일; born April 27, 1967) is a South Korean actor. Sung made his acting debut in theater in 1987, then was recruited at the 1991 SBS open talent auditions. He rose to fame as the comic, Jeolla dialect-speaking character "Red Socks" in the television drama Eun-shil, though he later tried to fight typecasting by playing the son of a chaebol tycoon in Love in 3 Colors and a university professor in March.

Following years of supporting roles in TV, Sung's film career was jumpstarted by hit romantic comedy 200 Pounds Beauty in 2006. Subsequently, he became one of Korean cinema's most reliable supporting actors, displaying his comic skills and easy charm in films such as Take Off, Foxy Festival, Children..., The Suicide Forecast, and The Client. He also had major roles in The Suck Up Project: Mr. XXX-Kisser, 3D blockbuster Mr. Go, and mystery-comedy The Accidental Detective. On the small screen, Sung garnered praise as a villain in The Slave Hunters, and a gruff but caring father in Reply 1997 and its spin-offs Reply 1994 and Reply 1988.

Sung gained a new surge of popularity in 2013 when he and his son Joon starred in Dad! Where Are We Going?, a reality/variety show featuring five male celebrities and their children on camping missions; his daughter Bin also joined him for the show's second season.

== Filmography ==
=== Film ===
Year	Title	Role	Notes	Ref.
2001	Running 7 Dogs	Pipe Kang		
2006	200 Pounds Beauty	Record company executive Choi		
2007	Myodoyahwa			
2008	Once Upon a Time	Nightclub owner		
2009	Take Off	Coach Bang		
2009	The Righteous Thief	Song Jae-pil		
2010	Hearty Paws 2	Hyeok-pil		
2010	Foxy Festival	Gi-bong		
2011	Children...	Park Kyung-sik		
2011	The Suicide Forecast	Manager Park Jin-seok		
2011	The Client	Jang Ho-won		
2011	S.I.U.	Detective Park In-moo		
2012	Miss Conspirator	Boss Sung		
2012	The Suck Up Project: Mr. XXX-Kisser	Heo Go-soo		
2012	The Grand Heist	Jang Soo-gyun		
2012	Return of the Mafia	Jang Seok-tae		
2013	Pinocchio	Gideon	(Korean dubbed)	
2013	Mr. Go	Seong Chung-su		
2013	Iris 2: The Movie	Park Joon-han		
2014	Miss Granny	Ban Hyun-chul		
2014	Thread of Lies	Kwak Man-ho		
2015	Chronicle of a Blood Merchant	Mr. Bang		
2015	Emperor's Holidays			
2015	The Accidental Detective	Noh Tae-soo		
2015	Circle of Atonement	Detective Lee Sang-won		
2015	A Letter from Prison			
2015	Sacrifice Revival Report			
2017	Because I Love You	Detective Park		
2017	The King	Tae-soo's home room teacher		
2017	I'm Doing Fine in Middle School	Police chief	special appearance	
2017	Real	Jo Won-geun		
2017	Midnight Runners	Professor Yang		
2017	RV: Resurrected Victims	Son Young-tae		
2017	The Chase	Park Pyung-dal		
2018	The Accidental Detective 2: In Action	Noh Tae-soo		
2018	Love+Sling	Seong-soo		
2018	The Great Battle	Woo-dae		
2018	Along with the Gods: The Last 49 Days			
2019	Metamorphosis	Gang-Goo		
2020	Pawn	Doo-seok		
2021	The Cursed: Dead Man's Prey	Jin Jong-hyun		
2022	The Pirates: The Last Royal Treasure	Merchant	Special appearance	
2022	Project Wolf Hunting	Dae-woong		
2024	Hijack 1971	Captain Gyu-sik		
2025	Forbidden Fairytale	Representative Hwang		
2025	Pretty Crazy	Jeong Jang-soo		

=== Television series ===
Year	Title	Role	Notes	Ref.
1992	Gwanchon Essay			
1993	Faraway Songba River	Private Yang Yong-cheon		
1995	Korea Gate	Ahn Jae-song / Kim Shin-jo		
1996	The Bicycle-Riding Woman			
1997	Snail			
1998	Eun-shil	Yang Jung-pal		
1999	Love in 3 Colors	Ahn Yoon-gi		
2000	March	Philosophy Professor		
2000	Wang Rung's Land			
2001	Cool	Jang Myung-ho		
2001	KBS TV Novel – "Plum Sonata"			
2002	Glass Slippers	Mr. Chan		
2002	Rustic Period	Adult Gae-ko		
2002	Open Drama Man and Woman – "My Love Soon-jung"	Man-soo		
2003	Drama City – "Why I Want to Get Married"	Manager		
2003	South of the Sun	Choi Tae-sik		
2003	Open Drama Man and Woman – "I'll Fall in Love This Fall"	Dal-woong		
2004	Lovers in Paris	Kang Pil-bo		
2005	Best Mother			
2005	Green Rose	Driver Jung Taek-soo		
2005	Fashion 70s			
2006	Drama City – "Scrubber No.3"	Jong-gu		
2006	I Want to Love	Baek Seung-tae		
2006	Please Come Back, Soon-ae	Airline passenger		
2006	MBC Best Theater – "A Walk Around the Neighborhood"			
2007	Witch Yoo Hee	Team leader Lee		
2007	Blue Fish	Jo Dong-man		
2007	Get Karl! Oh Soo-jung	Jung Seung-gyu		
2007	New Heart	Lee Seung-jae		
2008	Don't Be Swayed	Park Ki-chul		
2008	Lawyers of the Great Republic of Korea	Oh Ryu-dong		
2009	Green Coach	Yoon Chun-geun		
2010	The Slave Hunters	Chun Ji-ho		
2010	My Girlfriend Is a Gumiho	Ban Doo-hong		
2010	The Fugitive: Plan B	Nakamura Hwang		
2011	Can't Lose	Jo Jung-goo		
2011	Color of Woman	Park Chan-ho		
2012	Reply 1997	Sung Dong-il		
2012	Lovers of Haeundae	Impostor Prosecutor	Cameo (episode 15)	
2012	Jeon Woo-chi	Bong-goo		
2013	Iris II: New Generation	Park Joon-han	Cameo (episode 1–2)	
2013	Jang Ok-jung, Living by Love	Jang Hyun		
2013	Reply 1994	Sung Dong-il		
2014	Gap-dong	Yang Cheol-gon		
2014	It's Okay, That's Love	Jo Dong-min		
2015	Reply 1988	Sung Dong-il		
2016	Pied Piper	Police Officer	Cameo	
2016	Dear My Friends	Park Gyo-soo	Cameo	
2016	Moon Lovers: Scarlet Heart Ryeo	General Park Soo-kyung		
2016	The K2	Police Officer	Cameo	
2016	The Legend of the Blue Sea	Ma Dae-young		
2016	Hwarang: The Poet Warrior Youth	Kim Wi-hwa		
2017	The Package	Travel Agency President	Special appearance	
2017–2018	Prison Playbook	Chief Jo Ji-ho		
2018	Live	Ki Han-sol		
2018	Ms. Hammurabi	Han Sae-sang		
2018	Your Honor	Sa Ma-ryong		
2019	Trap	Go Dong-kook		
2019	Chief of Staff 2	Judge	Cameo (episode 10)	
2020	The Cursed	Jin Jong-hyun		
2020	Hospital Playlist	Ahn Jung-won's older brother	Special appearance	
2021	Sisyphus: The Myth	Park Hyeong-do		
2021	Somehow Family	Himself		
2021	Hospital Playlist 2	Ahn Dong-il	Cameo (episode 5)	
2021	Jirisan	Jo Dae-jin		
2022	Ghost Doctor	Tess		
2022	If You Wish Upon Me	Kang Tae-shik		
2022	Desperate Mr. X	Heo Jun / Master of Pack Pok		
2022	Curtain Call	Jeong Sang-cheol		
2023	Han River Police	Do Won-Il		
2024	The Tale of Lady Ok	Sung Kyu-Jin		
2025	The Art of Negotiation	Song Jae-sik		
2025	Butterfly	Dootae Kim		
2025	Twelve	Marok		
2025	Typhoon Family	Kang Jin-Young	Cameo	
2026	Bloody Flower	Park Han-joon		
TBA	Late Night Studio	Choi Seon-saeng		

=== Television shows ===
Year	Title	Role	Notes	Ref.
2006–2008	Good Day	Co-host		
2006–2007	Choi Hong-man and Strong Friends	Cast member		
2007	Delicious Asia			
2007	Grand Prix Show – Bad Dad Club			
2007	Brain Power Plant Q			
2008	Dream of Goose			
2013–2015	Dad! Where Are We Going?	Cast member		
2013	Saturday's Generation to Generation – Star Plus			
2014–2015	Off to School	Cast member	episodes 1-25, 27-33	
2020–2022	House on Wheels	Cast member	Season 1–4	
2022	Take Care of Me This Week	Host		
2025	Before It's Too Late ShalaShala	Cast member		
2025	House on Wheels - Beyond the Ocean	Cast member	Season 5	
2025–2026	Reply 1988 10th Anniversary	Cast member		

== Ambassadorship ==
- Public relations ambassador of the police with Park Hae-soo, Son Eun-seo (2019)
- Public relations ambassador of the national park with Lee Eung-bok (2021)

== Discography ==
Album information	Track listing
Red Socks Trot Medley (Romance Blues for Young-sook): Album; Released: May 10, 1999; Label: Doremi	Track listing: 1. 순정블루스 ( Romance Blues) # 쌈바의 여인 (Lady Ssamba ); 2. 다함께 차차차 ( Cha Cha Cha Together) # 찬찬찬 (Chan Chan Chan ); 3. 사랑은 나비인가봐 ( Love Is Like a Butterfly) # 남행열차 (South-bound Train ); 4. 봉선화 연정 ( Garden Balsam Love) # 신라의 달밤 (Moonlight of Silla ); 5. 뜨거운 안녕 ( Hot Greetings) # 순정블루스 (Romance Blues ); 6. 고향역 ( Hometown Station) # 소양강 처녀 (A Girl in Soyang River ); 7. 부산 갈매기 ( Busan Seagulls) # 옥경이 (Ok-gyeong ); 8. 베사메무쵸 ( Besame Mucho) # 불효자는 웁니다 (Undutiful Son Is Crying ); 9. 차표 한 장 ( A Ticket) # 순정블루스 (Romance Blues )

== Accolades ==
=== Awards and nominations ===
Name of the award ceremony, year presented, category, nominee of the award, and the result of the nomination
Award ceremony	Year	Category	Nominee / Work	Result	Ref.
Blue Dragon Film Awards	2009	Best Supporting Actor	Take Off	Nominated	
Chunsa Film Art Awards	2009	Best Supporting Actor	Take Off	Won	
KBS Drama Awards	2010	Best Supporting Actor	The Slave Hunters, The Fugitive: Plan B	Won	
KBS Drama Awards	2022	Best Supporting Actor	Curtain Call, If You Wish Upon Me	Won	
Korea Best Star Awards	2018	Best Popular Star Award	The Accidental Detective 2: In Action	Won	
Max Movie Awards	2010	Best Supporting Actor	Take Off	Won	
MBC Drama Awards	2005	Special Award, MC category	정보토크 팔방미인	Won	
SBS Drama Awards	2013	Excellence Award, Actor in a Drama Special	Jang Ok-jung, Living by Love	Won	
SBS Drama Awards	2014	Excellence Award, Actor in a Miniseries	It's Okay, That's Love	Won	
SBS Drama Awards	2016	Special Acting Award, Actor in a Fantasy Drama	The Legend of the Blue Sea	Won	
tvN10 Awards	2016	Best Actor	Reply 1997, Reply 1994, Reply 1988	Nominated	

=== Listicles ===
Name of publisher, year listed, name of listicle, and placement
Publisher	Year	Listicle	Rank	Ref.
Korean Film Council	2021	Korean Actors 200 (Note: Introduces 200 actors that best represent the present and future of Korean cinema to the people in the film industry all over the world.)	Included	
The Screen	2019	2009–2019 Top Box Office Powerhouse Actors in Korean Movies	38th	
