= Kim Dong-wook =

South Korean actor (born 1983)

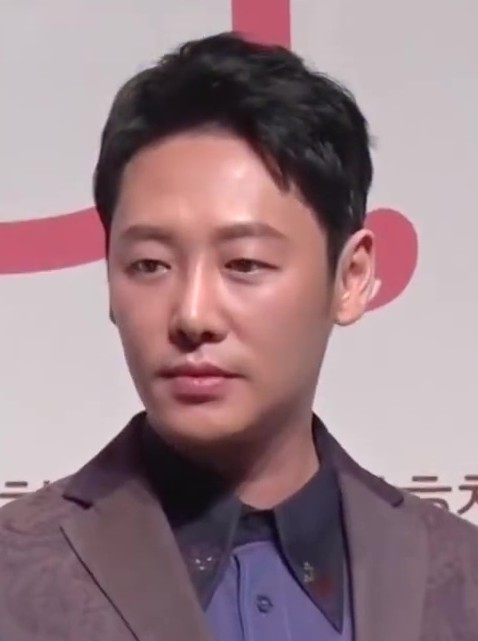
- Kim in January 2019
- Born: July 29, 1983 (age 43); Chuncheon, Gangwon, South Korea
- Education: Korea National University of Arts – School of Drama
- Occupation: Actor
- Years active: 2004–present
- Agent: Management Allum
- Height: 175 cm (5 ft 9 in)
- Spouse: Stella Kim (m. 2023)
- Children: 1

Korean name
- Hangul: 김동욱
- RR: Gim Donguk
- MR: Kim Tonguk

Kim Dong-wook (Korean: 김동욱; born July 29, 1983) is a South Korean actor. After appearing in student short films and several minor parts, Kim became a star through his supporting role in the popular TV series Coffee Prince (2007), followed by box office hit Take Off (2009). He then starred in Happy Killers (2010), Romantic Heaven (2011), The Guest (2018) and The King of Pigs (2022). His acclaimed performance as an obsessed and tormented king in the 2012 period drama The Concubine, along with his appearance in the fantasy action films Along with the Gods 1 and 2 has brought Kim the best reviews of his career yet.

== Career ==
After officially debuting in A Crimson Mark, Kim Dong-wook's first notable role was the angry, impoverished teenager in director Byun Young-joo's 2004 coming-of-age film Flying Boys. He then broke into the mainstream as the bubbly waiter in MBC's 2007 hit romantic comedy series Coffee Prince.

In the popular 2009 sports flick Take Off, he starred as a former night club bouncer who ends up being a member of Korea's national ski jumping team. In spite of the enormous physical challenge, Kim said it was a character he genuinely enjoyed playing.

His musical theatre debut was in On Air: Season 2, which was produced by his fellow alumni from the Korea National University of Arts. A loose spin-off of the TV series On Air, it takes place at a radio station and centers around an idol singer-turned-DJ and an older female PD. His follow-up the year after was the Korean production of Legally Blonde, the Broadway musical based on the 2011 Hollywood film of the same name. He played Luke Wilson's role Emmett. Kim said "the show must go on, no matter what" mentality was what he found appealing yet tough about doing musicals.

Kim then played lead roles in the omnibus film Five Senses of Eros, thriller Happy Killers, and melodrama Romantic Heaven. But it was his performance in period thriller The Concubine that he gained significant attention on the big screen. According to critics one of the finest of achievements of the 2012 period thriller is Kim's engrossing performance as the tormented Prince Sung-won, who gradually loses his sense of judgment and emotional control in the face of obsessive love. Kim said of playing the intense role, "While feeling sorry for him, I also found the complexity of the character fascinating. That's what drew me in."

In 2014, Kim made his acting comeback in the period drama series More Than a Maid. He had his big screen comeback in action comedy Three Summer Nights (2015). Kim then played the leading role in the cable slice-of-life drama Riders: Get Tomorrow (2015), which won him the Best Character Award at the Korea Cable TV Awards.

Kim played a significant role in the fantasy blockbuster Along With the Gods: The Two Worlds (2017) and its sequel, Along with the Gods: The Last 49 Days (2018); which won him several Best Supporting Actor accolades.

Kim was then cast in OCN's supernatural thriller The Guest (2018). The series was a hit and received positive reviews.

In 2019, Kim starred alongside Ko Sung-hee in the romantic comedy film Trade Your Love. In April, Kim is set to star in the comedy drama Special Labor Inspector.

In 2020, Kim was cast in the romance drama Find Me in Your Memory.

In 2021, Kim played the role of a psychiatrist in the new drama You Are My Spring, co-starring with Seo Hyun-jin.

In 2022, Kim as Hwang Kyung-min, who lives without forgetting the memories of school violence 20 years ago in the web series The King of Pigs.

In February 2025, Kim signed an exclusive contract with Plum A&C, later moving to Studio Uhoo in August 2025. On September 14, 2026, it was officially announced that he had signed with Management Allum.

== Personal life ==
=== Military service ===
Kim enlisted for his mandatory military service on August 30, 2012, at a training camp in Nonsan, South Chungcheong Province. He underwent five weeks of basic training and served for two years as a riot policeman for the Seoul Metropolitan Police Agency. Kim was discharged on May 29, 2014.

=== Philanthropy ===
On March 8, 2022, Kim donated ₩50 million to the Hope Bridge Disaster Relief Association to help the victims of the massive wildfire that started in Uljin, Gyeongbuk and has spread to Samcheok, Gangwon.

=== Marriage ===
On August 30, 2023, KeyEast confirmed that Kim is getting married with his non-celebrity girlfriend in this winter. The wedding ceremony will be held privately somewhere in Seoul. Their private wedding ceremony was held on December 22, 2023, at Myeongdong Cathedral. His wife is Stella Kim, a Korean-American and a former trainee under SM Entertainment. Before she was able to debut in the group Girls' Generation, she returned to the United States and currently works as a marketing expert. On November 24, 2025, Kim's agency announced that the couple was expecting their first child. On February 10, 2026, Stella Kim announced the birth of a daughter named Rowan Grace.

== Filmography ==
=== Film ===
Year	Title	Role	Notes	Ref.
2001	Monitor		Short film	
2002	Seoul			
2003	Tube			
2003	Super		Short film	
2003	My Wife is a Gangster 2	Na Nam-Ja		
2004	A Crimson Mark			
2004	Flying Boys			
2005	My Lovely Week			
2005	The Fever in Deep Blue Sea		Short film	
2005	The Apple		Short film	
2006	No Regret	Ga-ram		
2006	Burning Coals on His Head		Short film	
2006	My Night with Miss Marple		Short film	
2006	APT	Shin Jung-soo		
2007	A Nymph of a Lamp			
2008	Lost and Found	Han Ji-Hoon		
2008	Living Together, Happy Together			
2009	Five Senses of Eros	Han Ji-Woon		
2009	Take Off	Choi Hong-cheol		
2010	Cafe Seoul			
2010	Happy Killers	Choi Jung-min		
2010	Finding Mr. Destiny	Dr. Jung	Cameo	
2011	Romantic Heaven	Dong Ji-wook		
2011	The Cat	Jun-seok		
2011	Countdown	Nalpari		
2012	The Concubine	Prince Sung-won		
2015	Three Summer Nights	Myung-seok		
2017	Along With the Gods: The Two Worlds	Kim Soo-hong		
2018	The Accidental Detective 2: In Action	Kwon Chul-in	Cameo	
2018	Along with the Gods: The Last 49 Days	Kim Soo-hong		
2019	Trade Your Love	Sung-seok		
2025	The People Upstairs	Hyun-soo		

=== Television series ===
Year	Title	Role	Notes	Ref.
2006	Break	Yeong-hun	8 episodes	
2007	Coffee Prince	Jin Ha-rim		
2007	Unstoppable Marriage	Wang Sam-baek		
2009	Partner	Eul-su		
2009	Soul Special	Yoon-joon		
2009	Hometown of Legends: Silent Village	Yoogil		
2010	Blossom Sisters	Lee Jae-ha		
2011	The Great Gift	Goo-Ram	SBS Chuseok Special	
2011	I Trusted Him	Moon Hyun-soo		
2015	Riders: Catch Tomorrow	Cha Gi-jun		
2015	Cheo Yong 2	Lee Cheol-gyu	Cameo (Episode 1–2)	
2015	More Than a Maid	Kim Eun-gi		
2017	Radiant Office	Seo Hyun		
2018	The Guest	Yoon Hwa-pyung		
2019	Special Labor Inspector	Jo Jin-gap		
2020	Find Me in Your Memory	Lee Jung-hoon		
2021	You Are My Spring	Joo Young-do		
2022	Shooting Stars	Lee Jung-hoon	Cameo (Episode 8)	
2023	My Perfect Stranger	Yoon Hae-jun		
2023	Delightfully Deceitful	Han Moo-yeong		
2024	Seoul Busters	Dongbang Yu-bin		
2026	We Are All Trying Here	Jeong-min	Cameo (Episode 11)	

=== Web series ===
Year	Title	Role	Notes	Ref.
2022	The King of Pigs	Hwang Kyung-min		
2027	Born Guilty †	Yang Joong-sik	Cameo	

=== Television shows ===
Year	Title	Role	Notes	Ref.
2011	Saturday Night Live Korea	Host	Season 1 (Episode 5)	
2021	Saturday Night Live Korea	Host	Season 10 (Episode 8)	

=== Music video appearances ===
Title	Year	Artist	Notes/Ref.
"Forget About Love and Sing"	2007	8Eight	
"Please Take Care of My Boyfriend"	2013	Younha	
"Snowfall"	2018	g.o.d	featured with Shin Hye-sun

== Musical theater ==
Year	Title	Role	Ref.
2008	On Air: Season 2		
2009	Brave Brothers		
2010	Legally Blonde		
2015	Brave Brothers		

== Discography ==
=== Soundtrack appearances ===
Title	Year	Album
"You Are to Me"	2009	Soul Special OST
"Fly High" (with Shim Eun-kyung)	2010	Happy Killers OST
"Please Wait"	2015	Riders: Catch Tomorrow OST

== Accolades ==
=== Awards and nominations ===
Name of the award ceremony, year presented, category, nominee of the award, and the result of the nomination
Award ceremony	Year	Category	Nominee / Work	Result	Ref.
Baeksang Arts Awards	2018	Best Supporting Actor – Film	Along with the Gods: The Two Worlds	Nominated	
Blue Dragon Film Awards	2018	Best Supporting Actor	Along with the Gods: The Two Worlds	Nominated	
Chunsa Film Art Awards	2009	Ensemble Acting Award	Take Off	Won	
Chunsa Film Art Awards	2018	Best Supporting Actor	Along with the Gods: The Two Worlds	Won	
Director's Cut Awards	2009	Best New Actor	Take Off	Won	
Golden Cinematography Awards	2018	Best Supporting Actor	Along with the Gods: The Two Worlds	Won	
Korea Best Star Awards	2018	Best Supporting Actor	Along with the Gods: The Two Worlds	Won	
Korea Cable TV Awards	2016	Best Character	Riders: Catch Tomorrow	Won	
Korea Drama Awards	2007	Netizen Popularity Award	Coffee Prince	Won	
Korea Drama Awards	2019	Top Excellence Award, Actor	Special Labor Inspector	Won	
Max Movie Awards	2010	Best New Actor	Take Off	Won	
MBC Drama Awards	2017	Excellence Award, Actor in a Miniseries	Radiant Office	Nominated	
MBC Drama Awards	2019	Grand Prize (Daesang)	Special Labor Inspector	Won	
MBC Drama Awards	2019	Top Excellence Award, Actor in a Monday-Tuesday Miniseries	Special Labor Inspector	Won	
MBC Drama Awards	2020	Top Excellence Award, Actor in a Wednesday-Thursday Miniseries	Find Me in Your Memory	Nominated	
MBC Drama Awards	2020	Best Couple Award	Kim Dong-wook (with Moon Ka-young); Find Me in Your Memory	Won	
Seoul International Drama Awards	2019	Best Actor	Special Labor Inspector	Won	

=== Listicles ===
Name of publisher, year listed, name of listicle, and placement
Publisher	Year	Listicle	Placement	Ref.
Korean Film Council	2021	Korean Actors 200 (Note: Introduces 200 actors that best represent the present and future of Korean cinema to the people in the film industry all over the world.)	Included	
The Screen	2019	2009–2019 Top Box Office Powerhouse Actors in Korean Movies	41st	
