= Kanna-san Daiseikō Desu! =

Japanese manga series

カンナさん大成功です!
- Genre: Romantic comedy
- Manga
- Written by: Yumiko Suzuki
- Published by: Kodansha
- Imprint: KC Kiss
- Magazine: Kiss
- Original run: 1997 – 1999
- Volumes: 5
- Adaptations
- 200 Pounds Beauty (film, 2006); Kanna-san Daiseikō Desu! (film, 2009); 200 Pounds Beauty (stage play, 2008)

Kanna-san Daiseikō Desu! (カンナさん大成功です!) is a Japanese manga series written and illustrated by Yumiko Suzuki. It was serialized in Kodansha's josei manga magazine Kiss from 1997 to 1999. Its individual chapters were collected into five volumes. The manga was adapted into two films: one in South Korea in 2006 and one in Japan in 2009; it was also adapted into a stage play.

== Plot ==
Kannazuki Kanna was treated badly by everyone due to her look. In order to win the heart of Kosuke Rendaiji, the only man who is kind to her, she spends several million yen on full-body plastic surgery to become a beautiful woman. However, because she has internalized her ugly nature, she behaves in a way that is unbecoming of a beautiful woman, and she is unable to make the most of her good looks.

== Media ==
=== Manga ===
Written and illustrated by Yumiko Suzuki, the series began serialization in Kodansha's josei manga magazine Kiss in 1997. Its serialization was completed in 1999. The series' individual chapters were collected into five tankōbon volumes.

==== Volumes ====
No.	Japanese release date	Japanese ISBN
1	September 8, 1997	978-4-06-325738-0
2	February 4, 1998	978-4-06-325762-5
3	September 1, 1998	978-4-06-325788-5
4	February 3, 1999	978-4-06-325816-5
5	August 5, 1999	978-4-06-325845-5

=== Films ===
The manga was adapted into a live-action film in South Korea under the title 200 Pounds Beauty. It was released in South Korean theaters on December 14, 2006. The film was a critical and commercial success, surpassing six million views in South Korean theaters and becoming the ninth highest-grossing film in South Korea at the time.

The manga was also adapted into a live-action animation hybrid film in Japan. It was released in Japanese theaters on January 17, 2009. It underperformed and received mixed reviews from critics.

=== Stage play ===
A stage play adaptation, produced by the same company that produced the South Korean film adaptation, was performed at the Chungmu Arts Hall in Seoul from November 27, 2008, to February 1, 2009. Upon announcing plans for a performance to be held in Osaka, Kodansha filed an application for an injunction to the Tokyo District Court on September 14, 2011, alleging that the performance infringed the author's copyright. This request was denied by the Tokyo District Court and the performance was held as scheduled on October 6, 2011.

== Reception ==
Comedian Inagakisaki Sakura praised the characters. She also felt the story, especially the ending, was emotional. Manga scholar Yukari Fujimoto compared the story to Never Say Ugly, noting their common theme of lookism. She also felt that, despite its age, the manga was not outdated.

Upon its release in South Korea, the manga became popular, especially among young women.
