= 200 Pounds Beauty =

2006 South Korean film

- Promotional poster
- Hangul: 미녀는 괴로워
- Hanja: 美女는 괴로워
- Lit.: Beauty Is Painful
- RR: Minyeoneun goerowo
- MR: Minyŏnŭn koerowŏ
- Directed by: Kim Yong-hwa
- Written by: Kim Yong-hwa
- Based on: Kanna-san Daiseikō Desu! by Yumiko Suzuki
- Produced by: Park Mu-seung; Won Dong-yeon; Bang Chu-sung
- Starring: Kim Ah-joong; Joo Jin-mo
- Cinematography: Park Hyun-cheol
- Edited by: Park Gok-ji; Jeong Jin-hee
- Music by: Lee Jae-hak
- Production companies: REALies Pictures; KM Culture
- Distributed by: Showbox
- Release date: December 14, 2006
- Running time: 120 minutes
- Country: South Korea
- Language: Korean
- Budget: US$4 million
- Box office: US$42 million

200 Pounds Beauty (Korean: 미녀는 괴로워; lit. 'Beauty Is Painful') is a 2006 South Korean musical romantic comedy film written and directed by Kim Yong-hwa. It is based on the Japanese manga series Kanna-san Daiseikō Desu! (カンナさん大成功です!) by Yumiko Suzuki about an overweight ghost singer who undergoes intensive plastic surgery to become a pop sensation.

The film was a critical and commercial success. It was the third best-selling domestic film of 2006 with 6,619,498 admissions nationwide, grossing US$42,013,016. 200 Pounds Beauty also received several awards and nominations, including Best Actress for Kim Ah-joong at the 2007 Grand Bell Awards.

== Plot ==
Hanna Kang is an obese phone sex part-timer and a ghost singer for Ammy, a famous pop singer who actually lip syncs her songs instead of singing live. Hanna has a crush on Sang-jun Han, a director whose arrogant father Choi Han owns the record label Ammy is signed to. One day, Ammy sends Hanna an outfit supposedly from Sang-jun to wear to his birthday party, and wears the same outfit there just to humiliate her. While crying in the restroom, Hanna overhears Sang-jun tell Ammy to be nice to her in order to keep using her voice. Heartbroken, Hanna attempts suicide but is interrupted by a phone call from one of her phone sex clients, plastic surgeon Kong-hak Lee, and persuades him to perform extensive plastic surgery on her.

After a year of seclusion while recovering from the surgery, Hanna is so incredibly beautiful and slender that even her best friend Jung-min Park cannot recognize her at first. With Jung-min's help, Hanna reinvents herself as a Korean-American from California named Jenny. After re-auditioning to be Ammy's secret vocalist, she earns her own recording contract instead. Meanwhile, Ammy fears her own inability to sing will be exposed if the release of her second album is delayed. She desperately tries to find Hanna by spending time with Hanna's father who is suffering with Alzheimer's, but Sang-jun orders her to give up her search, threatening to terminate her contract if she does not stop. After many encounters with Jenny, they both realize that Jenny is actually Hanna.

Jenny's debut single "Maria" becomes a hit and at the release party, Ammy brings Hanna's father in an attempt to blow her cover. Desperate to keep her true identity a secret, Hanna ignores her father, infuriating Jung-min with her indifference. After the party, Sang-jun tells Hanna that he knows who she is, and cannot forgive her for lying to him. Hanna confesses her love for him and reveals she got plastic surgery in order to make him love her back. After realizing how worthless she was to him even as Jenny, Hanna decides that she is better off without him.

The next day, Ammy threatens to reveal Hanna's deception unless Sang-jun cancels Hanna's concert. Though Choi agrees, Sang-jun stands up to them and refuses, and encourages a distraught Hanna to do this concert, not for her fans or the record label but for herself. Before performing, Hanna apologizes to Jung-min for her earlier behavior, but Jung-min rebukes Hanna for the way she treated her own father. At the concert, Hanna tearfully confesses to the audience that she was a ghost singer to an ungrateful Ammy while she was overweight, and had extensive plastic surgery and abandoned everything that is dear to her, including her best friend and father, for her career. Sang-jun plays a tape of the old, obese Hanna, singing, which Hanna remarks is the real her. The crowd are moved by her sincere confession and praise her for showing her true self. Hanna reconciles with her father and Jung-min, drops the stage-name Jenny and becomes a highly successful music artist in her own name. Sang-jun realizes that he has always been in love with Hanna, and continues to promote her in hopes of pursuing a relationship with her.

== Cast ==
- Kim Ah-joong as Hanna Kang/Jenny
- Joo Jin-mo as Sang-jun Han
- Sung Dong-il as Choi Han
- Kim Hyun-sook as Jung-min Park
- Im Hyun-sik as Hanna's father
- Lee Han-wi as Kong-hak Lee
- Ji Seo-yun as Ammy
- Park No-sik as Jenny's fan
- Lee Beom-soo as Taxi driver (cameo)
- Kim Yong-gun as Record company CEO (cameo)
- Lee Won-jong as Fortune teller (cameo)
- Ryu Seung-soo as Traffic officer (cameo)

== Awards and nominations ==
2007 Chunsa Film Art Awards

- Best Actress – Kim Ah-joong
- Best Cinematography – Park Hyun-cheol
- Best Editing – Park Gok-ji
- Technical Award – Lee Seung-chul (Sound)

2007 Grand Bell Awards

- Best Actress – Kim Ah-joong
- Best Cinematography – Park Hyun-cheol
- Best Music – Lee Jae-hak
- Nomination – Best Film
- Nomination – Best Director – Kim Yong-hwa
- Nomination – Best Editing – Park Gok-ji
- Nomination – Best Art Direction – Jang Geun-young
- Nomination – Best Costume Design – Jo Sang-gyeong
- Nomination – Best Visual Effects – Jeong Seong-jin
- Nomination – Best Sound – Jeon Sang-jun, Lee Seung-chul

2007 Korea Movie Star Awards

- Best New Actress – Kim Ah-joong
- Best Couple Award – Kim Ah-joong and Joo Jin-mo
- Best Special Appearance – Lee Beom-soo

2007 Blue Dragon Film Awards

- Nomination – Best Film
- Nomination – Best Director – Kim Yong-hwa
- Nomination – Best Actress – Kim Ah-joong
- Nomination – Best Screenplay – Kim Yong-hwa
- Nomination – Best Music – Lee Jae-hak

2007 Korean Film Awards

- Nomination – Best Actress – Kim Ah-joong
- Nomination – Best Supporting Actress – Kim Hyun-sook
- Nomination – Best Editing – Park Gok-ji
- Nomination – Best Music – Lee Jae-hak
- Nomination – Best Visual Effects – Jeong Seong-jin

== Soundtrack ==
The soundtrack album was released by KM Culture and SBS Contents Hub on December 13, 2006.

The title track is a cover of the Blondie song "Maria," sung in Korean by the film's star, Kim Ah-joong.

Director Kim Yong-hwa has been friends with music director Lee Jae-hak since their college days. Lee is a member of the modern rock band Loveholic, which is also featured in the soundtrack.

| No. | Title | Artist | Length |
|---|---|---|---|
| 1. | "Beautiful Girl" | Kim Ah-joong | 1:49 |
| 2. | "별" (Star) | Youme | 5:02 |
| 3. | "Maria" | Kim Ah-joong | 3:07 |
| 4. | "Dance with My Daddy" | Alex Chu | 3:00 |
| 5. | "You Don't Know I Love You" | U | 4:08 |
| 6. | "슈퍼스타" (Superstar) | Loveholic | 3:19 |
| 7. | "튜울립" (Tulip) | Venny (Sangsang Band) feat. Jong-hwi | 3:19 |
| 8. | "Miss You Much" | Youme | 3:26 |
| 9. | "Beautiful Girl (teaser edit)" | Kim Ah-joong feat. Alex Chu | 1:29 |
| 10. | "바보처럼" (Like a Fool) | Kim Hyung-joong | 4:01 |
| 11. | "별 (original dialog ver.)" (Star (original dialog ver.)) | Kim Ah-joong | 2:04 |
