= Take Off (2009 film) =

- Theatrical release poster
- Hangul: 국가대표
- Hanja: 國家代表
- RR: Gukgadaepyo
- MR: Kukkadaep'yo
- Directed by: Kim Yong-hwa
- Written by: Kim Yong-hwa
- Produced by: Park Mu-seung; Bang Chu-sung
- Starring: Ha Jung-woo; Kim Dong-wook; Kim Ji-seok; Choi Jae-hwan; Lee Jae-eung; Sung Dong-il
- Cinematography: Park Hyun-cheol
- Edited by: Park Gok-ji; Jeong Jin-hee
- Music by: Lee Jae-hak
- Production company: KM Culture
- Distributed by: Showbox
- Release date: July 30, 2009
- Running time: 139 minutes
- Country: South Korea
- Language: Korean
- Box office: US$52.1 million

Take Off (Korean: 국가대표; lit. 'National Representative') is a 2009 South Korean sports drama film written and directed by Kim Yong-hwa. The film was the 2nd most attended film of the year in South Korea with 8,392,953 admissions.

== Plot ==
Cha Heon-tae, a Korean-American whose English name is Bob, was adopted with his sister to American parents. He appears on a Korean television program in search of his mother. Since Heon-tae is a trained alpine skier, he is approached by Coach Bang who wants to recruit members for a new national ski jumping team for the approaching 1998 Winter Olympics. The other members are Choi Hong-cheol, a night club waiter who quit being an athlete for drugs; Ma Jae-bok, who works at a meat restaurant and has a strict father; and Kang Chil-gu, who lives with his grandmother and autistic brother Bong-gu. Bob initially refuses to lead the team but after meeting Bang su-yeon, the mysterious scam artist who is the daughter of Coach Bang, and seeing his mother who still suffers from insults from a rich family, decides to prove himself to his mother through the team project. All eventually become good skiers, but are out of practice. To gear up for the qualifying match at the World Cup, they overcome their fear and train in unusual places, such as from the top of cars, amusement park roller coasters, etc. After almost getting disqualified because of a fight the night before, they succeed in qualifying at the World Cup. But the victory is bittersweet once they hear the IOC opted for Salt Lake City over Korea's Muju County. Unfortunately, because of deep fog, Chil-gu injures his leg and becomes unable to compete. Bong-gu decides to jump as a substitute but does not make the required distance for a gold medal and nearly loses his life. Despite their loss, the athletes rejoice because Bong-gu survived the jump, and the Koreans back home are proud of them.

== Cast ==
- Ha Jung-woo - Cha Heon-tae/Bob
- Kim Dong-wook - Choi Hong-cheol
- Kim Ji-seok - Kang Chil-gu
- Choi Jae-hwan - Ma Jae-bok
- Lee Jae-eung - Kang Bong-gu
- Sung Dong-il - Coach Bang
- Lee Eun-sung - Su-yeon
- Shin Soo-yeon - Ri Ji-hye (young)
- Ma Dong-seok (Cameo)
- Lee Hye-sook - Bob's birth mother
- Lee Se-rang - Middle-aged woman from Yanbian, China
- Juni - Young woman from Yanbian, China
- Lee Han-wi - Company president Ma
- Kim Yong-gun - Chairman of the organizing committee
- Hwang Ha-na - Ji-eun (Bob's younger sister)
- Seo Min-yi - 3 year old Ji-eun
- Kim Ji-young - Bong-gu's grandmother
- Oh Kwang-rok - Pharmacist
- Kim Soo-ro - Loan shark boss
- Jo Seok-hyeon - Employee at Military Manpower Administration
- Park Seong-taek - Japanese broadcaster
- Kim Sung-joo - Korean broadcaster
- Cho Jin-woong - Korean broadcaster 2
- Lee Geum-hee - Korean broadcaster 3
- Lee Seol-ah - Hye-ra
- Jung Min-sung - Classifieds journalist
- Henny Savenije - German sports anchor
- Richard Wilson - Finnish sports anchor

== Relevance ==
Korea is new to the venue of ski jumping, and there were only five members of the national team, so this event is not well known to the Korean people. Film director Kim Yong-hwa made this movie to introduce the ski jumping event to Koreans, in order to pique their interest and therefore improve national support for the event. In order to do that, he cast top actor Ha Jung-woo. Kim also introduced the background on the players and the environment in which they practiced. This was the first Olympics in which the Korean ski jump team competed, so they did not receive much financing. Therefore, they had to practice in a bad training area. Despite this, they managed to attend the Olympics.

== Accolades ==
Year	Award	Category	Recipients	Result	Ref.
2009	5th University Film Festival of Korea	Best Actor	Ha Jung-woo	Won	
2009	17th Chunsa Film Art Awards	Best Film	Take Off	Won	
2009	17th Chunsa Film Art Awards	Best Supporting Actor	Sung Dong-il	Won	
2009	17th Chunsa Film Art Awards	Best Supporting Actress	Lee Hye-sook	Won	
2009	17th Chunsa Film Art Awards	Technical Award	Lee Seung-chul, Lee Sang-joon (Sound)	Won	
2009	17th Chunsa Film Art Awards	Ensemble Acting Award	Ha Jung-woo, Kim Dong-wook, Kim Ji-seok, Choi Jae-hwan, Lee Jae-eung	Won	
2009	29th Korean Association of Film Critics Awards	Best Director	Kim Yong-hwa	Won	
2009	29th Korean Association of Film Critics Awards	Best Music	Lee Jae-hak	Won	
2009	29th Korean Association of Film Critics Awards	Technical Award	Jeong Seong-jin (Visual Effects)	Won	
2009	46th Grand Bell Awards	Best Film	Take Off	Nominated	
2009	46th Grand Bell Awards	Best Director	Kim Yong-hwa	Won	
2009	46th Grand Bell Awards	Best Actor	Ha Jung-woo	Nominated	
2009	46th Grand Bell Awards	Best Cinematography	Park Hyun-cheol	Nominated	
2009	46th Grand Bell Awards	Best Visual Effects	Jeong Seong-jin	Won	
2009	46th Grand Bell Awards	Best Editing	Park Gok-ji	Nominated	
2009	46th Grand Bell Awards	Best Planning	Kim Yong-hwa, Kim Min-seok, Shim Young, Kim Ho-seong	Nominated	
2009	30th Blue Dragon Film Awards	Best Film	Take Off	Nominated	
2009	30th Blue Dragon Film Awards	Best Director	Kim Yong-hwa	Won	
2009	30th Blue Dragon Film Awards	Best Actor	Ha Jung-woo	Nominated	
2009	30th Blue Dragon Film Awards	Popular Star Award	Ha Jung-woo	Won	
2009	30th Blue Dragon Film Awards	Best Supporting Actor	Sung Dong-il	Nominated	
2009	30th Blue Dragon Film Awards	Best New Actor	Kim Ji-seok	Nominated	
2009	30th Blue Dragon Film Awards	Best Screenplay	Kim Yong-hwa	Nominated	
2009	30th Blue Dragon Film Awards	Best Cinematography	Park Hyun-cheol	Won	
2009	30th Blue Dragon Film Awards	Best Lighting	Lee Seok-hwan	Nominated	
2009	30th Blue Dragon Film Awards	Best Music	Lee Jae-hak	Nominated	
2009	30th Blue Dragon Film Awards	Technical Award	Jeong Seong-jin (Visual Effects)	Nominated	
2009	32nd Golden Cinematography Awards	Best New Actor	Kim Ji-seok	Won	
2009	12th Director's Cut Awards	Best New Actor	Kim Dong-wook	Won	
2010	7th Max Movie Awards	Best Actor	Ha Jung-woo	Won	
2010	7th Max Movie Awards	Best Supporting Actor	Sung Dong-il	Won	
2010	7th Max Movie Awards	Best New Actor	Kim Dong-wook	Won	
2010	46th Baeksang Arts Awards	Best Film	Take Off	Won	
2010	46th Baeksang Arts Awards	Best Director	Kim Yong-hwa	Nominated	
2010	46th Baeksang Arts Awards	Best Actor	Ha Jung-woo	Won	
2010	46th Baeksang Arts Awards	Best New Actor	Kim Ji-seok	Nominated	

== Sequel ==
The sequel Take Off 2 is directed by Kim Jong-hyun, and its predominantly female cast is led by Soo Ae, playing a North Korean defector who becomes a national ice hockey player. Also starring Kim Seul-gi, Jin Ji-hee and Oh Dal-su, the film began shooting in October 2015.
