= Im Soo-jung =

South Korean actress (born 1979)

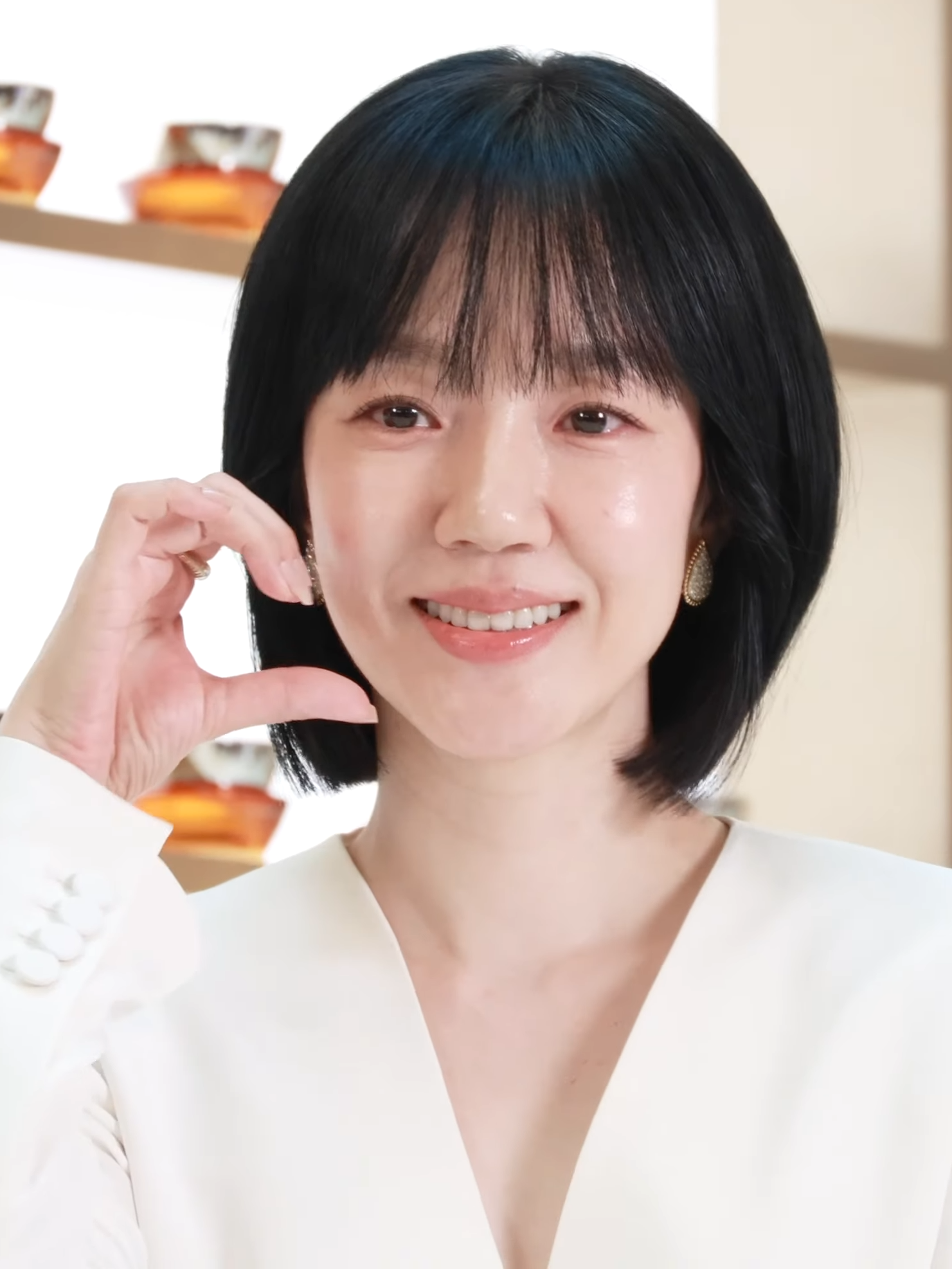
- Im in September 2024
- Born: July 11, 1979 (age 47); Seoul, South Korea
- Occupation: Actress
- Years active: 1998–present
- Agent: MYM Entertainment

Korean name
- Hangul: 임수정
- RR: Im Sujeong
- MR: Im Sujŏng
- Website: imsoojung.com

Im Soo-jung (Korean: 임수정; born July 11, 1979) is a South Korean actress and former model. After modeling for teen magazines, Im made her acting breakthrough in Kim Jee-woon's horror film A Tale of Two Sisters (2003), followed by the popular television series I'm Sorry, I Love You (2004). She has since appeared in numerous films, notably Lump Sugar (2006), I'm a Cyborg, But That's OK (2006), Happiness (2007), Jeon Woo-chi: The Taoist Wizard (2009), Finding Mr. Destiny (2010) and All About My Wife (2012), for which she won Best Actress at the 33rd Blue Dragon Film Awards.

Recently, she starred in the television series Chicago Typewriter (2017), Search: WWW (2019), and Melancholia (2021).

== Career ==
Im Soo-jung made her debut in 1998 as a cover model for teen magazines. She then moved onto acting and debuted in the teen drama School 4, but it was Kim Jee-woon's 2003 stylish horror A Tale of Two Sisters that first drew her critical notice and newcomer awards.

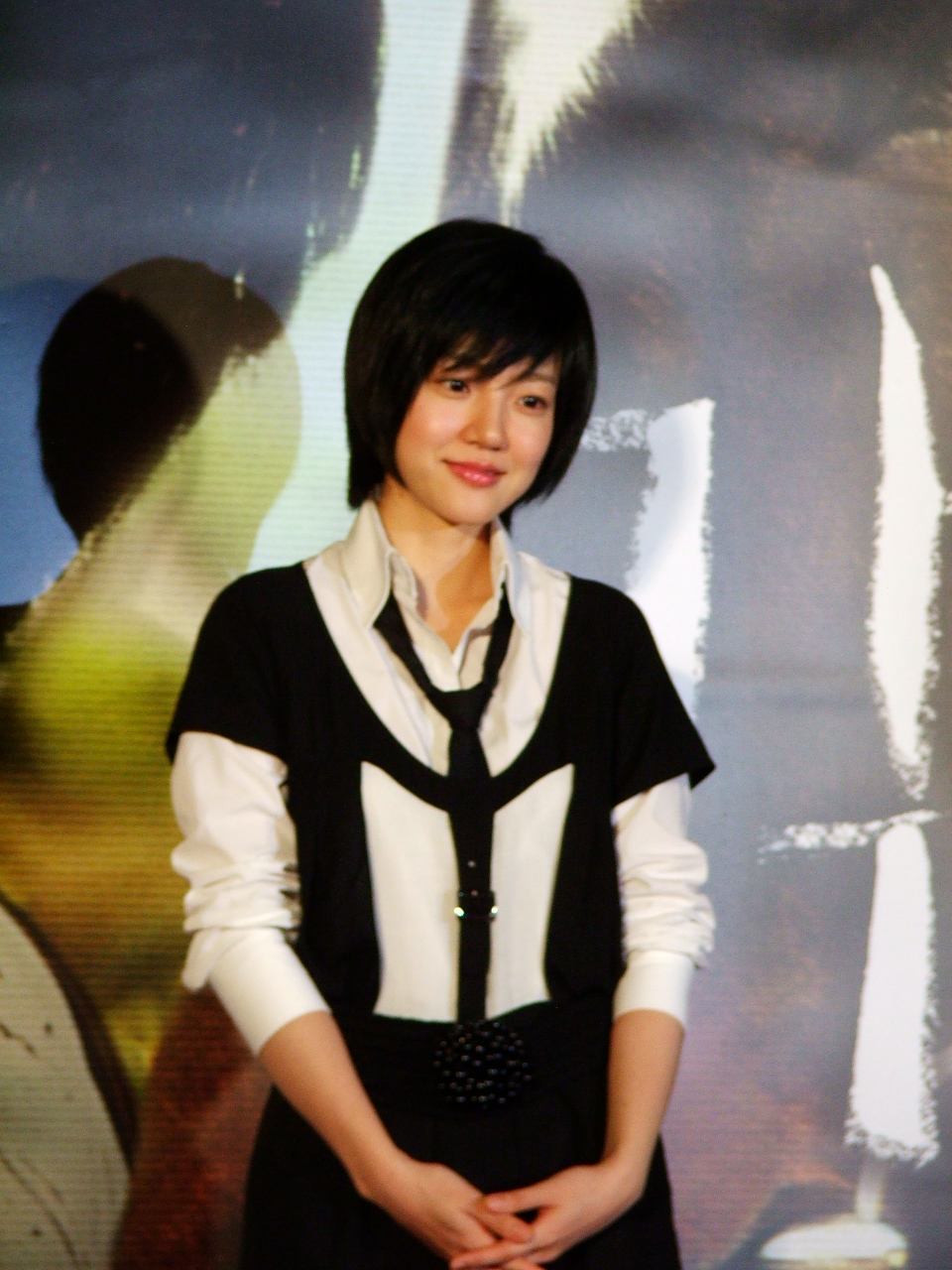
Im in January 2004

A year later in 2004, the KBS2 drama series I'm Sorry, I Love You brought her into the public eye. With Im looking much younger than her age, those projects solidified her image as an eternal ingenue, as did touching character study ...ing, horse jockey film Lump Sugar, and Park Chan-wook's surrealist I'm a Cyborg, But That's OK.

In 2007, she began shedding that image by taking on more adult roles, notable among them Hur Jin-ho's romantic melodrama Happiness, Choi Dong-hoon's blockbuster fantasy Jeon Woo-chi: The Taoist Wizard, romantic comedy Finding Mr. Destiny and Lee Yoon-ki's minimalist breakup indie Come Rain, Come Shine. For her performance in All About My Wife, she won Best Actress at the Blue Dragon Film Awards, and the Women in Film Korea Awards.

Im and Lee Jung-jae played two artists in a post-apocalyptic environment in the short film El Fin del Mundo ("The End of the World"), which screened at the prestigious contemporary art exhibition dOCUMENTA. She also acted opposite veteran Thai actor Sorapong Chatree in Aditya Assarat's short film Phuket, which was commissioned jointly by the Ministry of Foreign Affairs and the Association of Tourism and Hotel Operators of Phuket.

Im was previously part of the SidusHQ agency, but moved to being managed by KeyEast. KeyEast launched her official website in June 2012. According to the actress, the online space will be a place where she can converse with her fans directly.

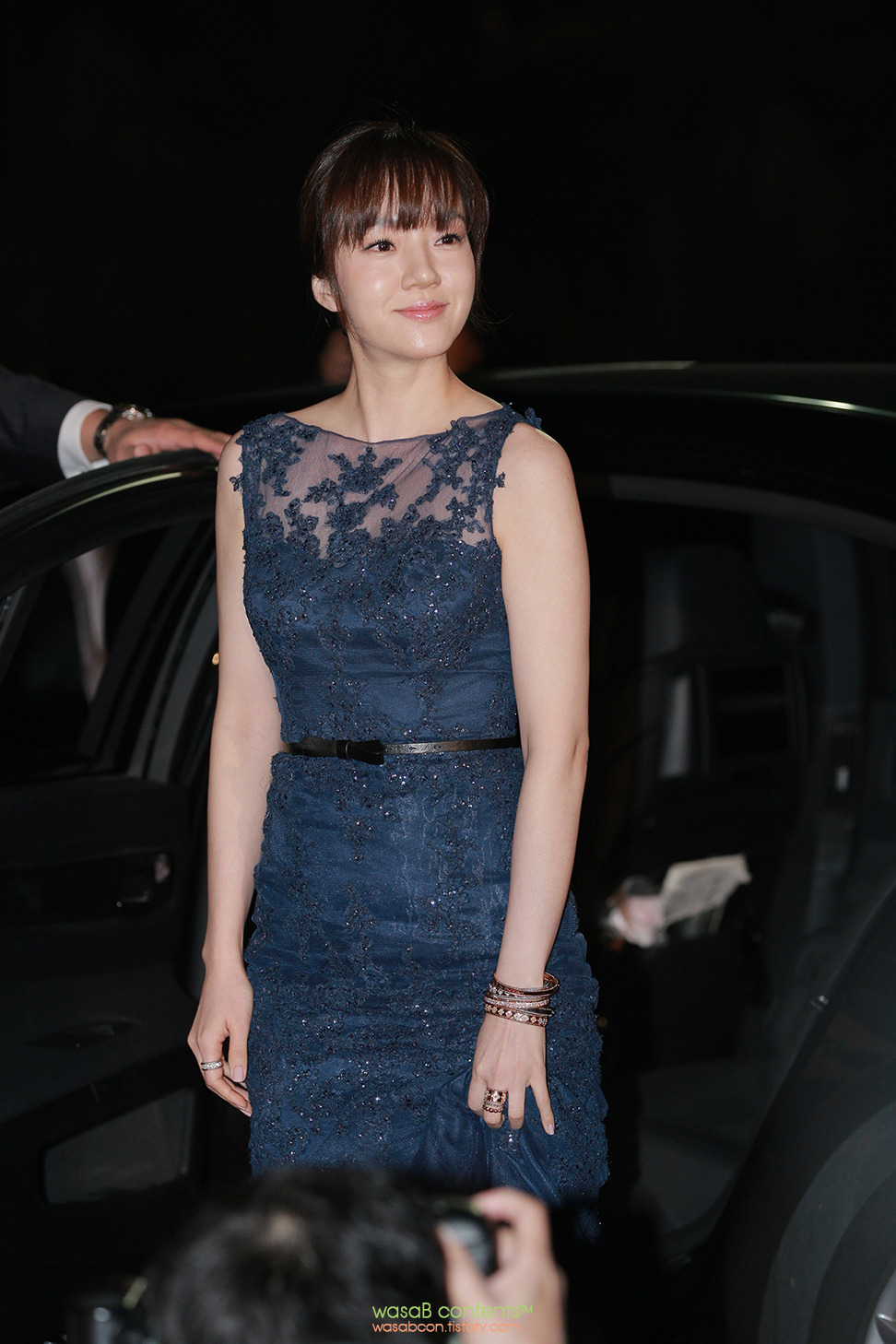
Im in November 2013

In 2015, Im starred in Perfect Proposal, a remake of British crime thriller Woman of Straw that was partly shot in Macau. She next starred in Time Renegades, a time-hopping romantic thriller where she played dual roles.

In October 2015, her contract with KeyEast expired and she decided to sign with new management agency YNK Entertainment.

Im then starred in the female-centric indie film The Table directed by Kim Jong-kwan, which premiered at the 21st Busan International Film Festival.

In February 2017, Im was cast in the drama Chicago Typewriter alongside Yoo Ah-in. This marks Im's small screen come back after thirteen years since 2004. The same year, she was named the cultural ambassador for the UK-Korea Creative Futures mutual exchange. She then returned to the big screen with Mothers based on the book Your Request - My Other Mother by Lee Dong-eun, who also directs the film.

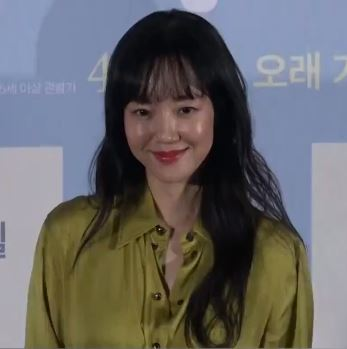
Im in April 2018

In 2019, Im returned to the small screen with the series Search: WWW.

In 2020, Im appeared the film Single in Seoul with Lee Dong-wook.

In 2021, Im starred in the tvN drama Melancholia alongside Lee Do-hyun.

In 2022, Im's contract with King Kong by Starship expired in August, and she decided not to renew the contract.

In November 2024, Im signed with new agency MYM Entertainment.

== Personal life ==
In an interview with Kwak Soo-jung in 2021, Im Soo-jung stated that she had become a vegan and was an advocate of animal rights.

On how she became a vegan, she said: "After going on a vegan trip with an acquaintance, my lifestyle became completely different from before. As a result, I naturally became interested in animal welfare and the environment. In the end, it was all connected."

On her thoughts on the difficulty in maintaining a vegan diet, she said: "The number of vegetarian restaurants is limited in some neighbourhoods [of Seoul]... It's important to have more vegetarian restaurants, but it's okay if there are vegetarians options... even if it's not vegan, I hope more restaurants will have one or two vegetarian options so that people don't feel alienated. If we do that, I think we can enjoy a sustainable vegetarian culture together into the future."

Concerning animal products, she said: "[On set] I have to wear leather clothes or bags because of my role, and I can have trouble locating alternative materials. There are times when stylists can't pick up these clothes or accessories as much as they want. No one says anything because it's acting, but I sometimes falter a little by myself. That's a bit agonizing. Fortunately, fake fur and artificial leather are so good these days, so I wear them mainly, but I try not to even do that. Some people may think it's a little too much, but I think that artificial leather and faux fur should be avoided as well. Because even if it's fake, it's true that if it looks good, it will eventually lead to more consumption of leather and fur materials without recognizing the boundaries between fake and real."

== Filmography ==
Key
†	Denotes films that have not yet been released

=== Film ===
Film performances
Year	Title	Role	Ref.
2002	The Romantic President	Han Young-hee	
2003	A Tale of Two Sisters	Bae Su-mi	
2003	...ing	Kang Min-ah	
2005	Sad Movie	Ahn Soo-jung	
2006	Lump Sugar	Kim Shi-eun	
2006	I'm a Cyborg, But That's OK	Cha Young-goon	
2007	Happiness	Eun-hee	
2009	Jeon Woo-chi: The Taoist Wizard	Seo In-kyung	
2010	Finding Mr. Destiny	Seo Ji-woo	
2011	Come Rain, Come Shine	Young-shin	
2012	All About My Wife	Yeon Jung-in	
2015	Perfect Proposal	Ji-yeon	
2016	Time Renegades	Seo Yoon-jung / Jung So-eun	
2017	The Table	Hye-gyeong	
2018	Mothers	Hyo-jin	
2019	Our Cat	Narration (voice)	
2023	Cobweb	Lee Min-jae	
2023	Single in Seoul	Joo Hyeon-jin	

=== Television series ===
Television series performances
Year	Title	Role	Ref.
2001	School 4	Oh Hye-ra	
2004	I'm Sorry, I Love You	Song Eun-chae	
2017	Chicago Typewriter	Jeon Seol	
2019	Search: WWW	Bae Ta-mi	
2021	Melancholia	Ji Yoon-soo	
2025	Low Life	Yang Jung-sook	
2026	Mad Concrete Dreams	Kim Seon	

=== Music video appearances ===
Year	Song title	Artist	Ref.
1999	"Deep Sadness"	Y2K	
2001	"I'm Sorry"	Kim Jang-hoon	
2012	"White Night"	Nell	
2024	"Jealous"	Sunwoo Jung-a	

== Awards and nominations ==
Name of the award ceremony, year presented, category, nominee of the award, and the result of the nomination
Award ceremony	Year	Category	Nominee / Work	Result	Ref.
Asia-Pacific Film Festival	2012	Best Actress	All About My Wife	Nominated	
Asian Film Awards	2007	Best Actress	I'm a Cyborg, But That's OK	Nominated	
Baeksang Arts Awards	2005	Best New Actress – Television	I'm Sorry, I Love You	Nominated	
Baeksang Arts Awards	2007	Best Actress – Film	I'm a Cyborg, But That's OK	Nominated	
Baeksang Arts Awards	2008	Best Actress – Film	Happiness	Nominated	
Baeksang Arts Awards	2013	Best Actress – Film	All About My Wife	Nominated	
Baeksang Arts Awards	2026	Best Supporting Actress – Television	Low Life	Won	
Blue Dragon Film Awards	2003	Best New Actress	A Tale of Two Sisters	Won	
Blue Dragon Film Awards	2006	Best Actress	Lump Sugar	Nominated	
Blue Dragon Film Awards	2007	Best Actress	Happiness	Nominated	
Blue Dragon Film Awards	2012	Best Actress	All About My Wife	Won	
Blue Dragon Series Awards	2026	Best Supporting Actress	Low Life	Nominated	
Buil Film Awards	2008	Best Actress	Happiness	Nominated	
Buil Film Awards	2012	Best Actress	All About My Wife	Nominated	
Busan Film Critics Awards	2003	Best New Actress	A Tale of Two Sisters	Won	
Chunsa Film Art Awards	2008	Best Actress	Happiness	Nominated	
Cine21 Film Awards	2003	Best New Actress	A Tale of Two Sisters	Won	
Director's Cut Awards	2003	Best New Actress	A Tale of Two Sisters	Won	
Director's Cut Awards	2026	Best Actress in a Series	Low Life	Won	
Fantasporto Film Festival	2004	Best Actress in an International Fantasy Film	A Tale of Two Sisters	Won	
Grand Bell Awards	2004	Best New Actress	A Tale of Two Sisters	Nominated	
Grand Bell Awards	2008	Best Actress	Happiness	Nominated	
Grand Bell Awards	2012	Best Actress	All About My Wife	Nominated	
Hong Kong International Film Festival	2007	Best Actress	I'm a Cyborg, But That's OK	Nominated	
KBS Drama Awards	2004	Best Couple Award	Im Soo-jung (with So Ji-sub); I'm Sorry, I Love You	Won	
KBS Drama Awards	2004	Best New Actress	I'm Sorry, I Love You	Won	
KBS Drama Awards	2004	Netizen Award	I'm Sorry, I Love You	Won	
KBS Drama Awards	2004	Popularity Award	I'm Sorry, I Love You	Won	
Korea Drama Awards	2019	Top Excellence Award, Actress	Search: WWW	Nominated	
Korean Association of Film Critics Awards	2003	Best New Actress	A Tale of Two Sisters	Won	
Korean Film Awards	2003	Best New Actress	A Tale of Two Sisters	Won	
Premiere Rising Star Awards	2006	Best Actress	Lump Sugar	Won	
Screamfest Horror Film Festival	2003	Best Actress	A Tale of Two Sisters	Won	
Style Icon Awards	2012	Style Icon	Im Soo-jung	Won	
Women in Film Korea Awards	2003	Best New Actress	A Tale of Two Sisters	Nominated	
Women in Film Korea Awards	2012	Best Actress	All About My Wife	Won	
