= 24th Beijing College Student Film Festival =

2017 film festival in Beijing, China

The 24th annual Beijing College Student Film Festival (Chinese: 第24届北京大学生电影节) took place in Beijing, China between April 8 and May 7, 2017. This Is Not What I Expected was selected as the festival's opening night film.

== Winners and nominees ==
Best Film: The Wasted Times; The Summer Is Gone; Soul Mate; Kaili Blues; I Am Not Madame Bovary	Best Director: Feng Xiaogang – I Am Not Madame Bovary; Bi Gan – Kaili Blues; Zhang Dalei – The Summer Is Gone; Cheng Er – The Wasted Times; Cao Baoping – Cock and Bull
Best Screenplay: Soul Mate – Lam Wing Sum, Li Yuan, Xu Yi-meng, Wu Nan; The Wasted Times – Cheng Er; Cock and Bull – Cao Baoping, Zhang Tianhui, Yang Jianjun; Happiness – Andy Lo; I Am Not Madame Bovary – Liu Zhenyun	Jury Award: The Summer Is Gone
Best Actor: Zhang Yi – Cock and Bull; Dong Zijian – De Lan; Eddie Peng – Operation Mekong; Zhang Hanyu – Operation Mekong; Li Xuejian – Old Aunt	Best Actress: Wan Qian – The Insanity; Zhou Dongyu – Soul Mate; Ma Sichun – Soul Mate; Kara Wai – Happiness; Liu Mintao – Black Butterfly
Best Newcomer: Su Xiaodan – What's in the Darkness; Kong Weiyi – The Summer Is Gone; Chen Yongzhong – Kaili Blues	Best Directorial Debut: Wang Yichun – What's in the Darkness; Liu Yulin – Someone to Talk To; Wang Xuebo – Knife in the Clear Water
Best Visual Effects: Operation Mekong; Cold War 2; Crosscurrent	Students' Choice Award for Favorite Film: Operation Mekong
Students' Choice Award for Favorite Director: Tsui Hark	Students' Choice Award for Favorite Actor: Zhang Hanyu
Students' Choice Award for Favorite Actress: Zhao Liying	Artistic Exploration Award: Kaili Blues; I Am Not Madame Bovary; The Summer Is Gone; Crosscurrent
Organizing Committee Award: Old Aunt; China Salesman
