= Seoul Arts College =

Seoul Arts College may refer to either of two schools in Seoul, South Korea:

- Seoul Institute of the Arts (SeoulArts), in Ansan (main site) and Seoul
- Seoul Arts College (Gangnam) in Gangnam District
