= Single in Seoul =

2023 South Korean romantic comedy film

- Theatrical release poster
- Hangul: 싱글 인 서울
- Lit.: Single in Seoul
- RR: Singgeul in Seoul
- MR: Singgŭl in Sŏul
- Directed by: Park Beom-soo
- Written by: Lee Ji-min
- Starring: Lee Dong-wook; Im Soo-jung
- Cinematography: Seong Seung-taek
- Edited by: Kim Seon-min
- Music by: Kim Dong-wook
- Production companies: DCG Plus; Myung Films
- Distributed by: Lotte Entertainment
- Release date: November 29, 2023
- Running time: 103 minutes
- Country: South Korea
- Language: Korean
- Box office: US$3 million

Single in Seoul (Korean: 싱글 인 서울) is a 2023 South Korean romantic comedy film directed by Park Beom-soo, starring Lee Dong-wook and Im Soo-jung. The film follows Yeong-ho, who likes to be alone, and Hyeon-jin a gregarious publisher, who writes an essay about single life. It was released theatrically on November 29, 2023.

== Synopsis ==
The story revolves around two people who have different temperament and lifestyle. They meet via an essay about single life, and then old memories are rekindled, opening the past wounds.

Park Yeong-ho (Lee Dong-wook) is an instructor and influencer with 300,000 followers, who enjoys being single. Joo Hyeon-jin (Im Soo-jung) is Park Yeong-ho's college junior and an editor-in-chief of a publishing company and in-charge of the essay series titled "Single in the City".

== Cast ==
- Lee Dong-wook as Park Yeong-ho, a successful essay instructor and power influencer.
- Im Soo-jung as Joo Hyeon-jin, chief editor of a publishing company.
- Esom as Agatha Hong, best-selling author of a mysterious romantic novel.
- Jang Hyun-sung as Jin-pyo, president of the publishing company.
- Kim Ji-young as co-owner of the publishing company.
- Lee Mi-do as Yoon Jeong, Joo Hyeon-jin's coworker, senior employee of the editorial team.
- Lee Sang-yi as Byeong-soo, an intern.
- Ji Yi-soo as Ye-ri, member of editorial team.
- Yoon Jung-eun as member of editorial team.
- Ryu Hye-rin as Park Joon-hee

=== Special appearance ===
- Yoon Kye-sang as Seon-woo

== Production ==
=== Casting ===
In June 2020, Lee Dong-wook and Im Soo-jung were offered to play Park Yeong-ho, an instructor and influencer, and Lim Soo-jung, the editor-in-chief of a publishing company respectively. Lee Dong-wook and Im Soo-jung worked in Search: WWW, though Dong-wook's appearance was short.

=== Filming ===
The principal photography began on November 14, 2020, and is scheduled to last for three months.

== Music ==
OST of the film was released on November 23, 2023. The OST features Kim Hyeon-cheol's "After a Long Time" and Akdong Musician's "Long Day, Long Night".

== Release ==
The film theatrically released on November 29, 2023, by Lotte Entertainment.

== Reception ==
=== Box office ===
The film was released on November 29 on 917 screens. It opened at first place on the Korean box-office with 71,003 cumulative admissions and a collection of US$460,615.

As of December 24, 2023, it is at 25th place among the Korean films released in 2023, with gross of US$2,834,842 and 394,683 admissions.

=== Critical response ===
Park Ji-yoon writing in The Fact criticised the story but praised the performance of actors, writing, "it was the actors' passionate performances that saved the somewhat sloppy story." Park Jae-hwan wrote in review that "the film shows the sensibility between coldness and passion and does not have the same gap as "Men are from Venus, Women are from Mars"." Park praised the performances of Lee Dong-wook and Lim Soo-jung, Jang Hyun-seong, Kim Ji-young, Lee Mi-do, Ji I-soo, and Lee Sang-i. Park concluded, "It cannot be denied that this is a work that reveals the true skills of Myeong Film."
