= Koo Kyo-hwan =

South Korean filmmaker and actor (born 1982)

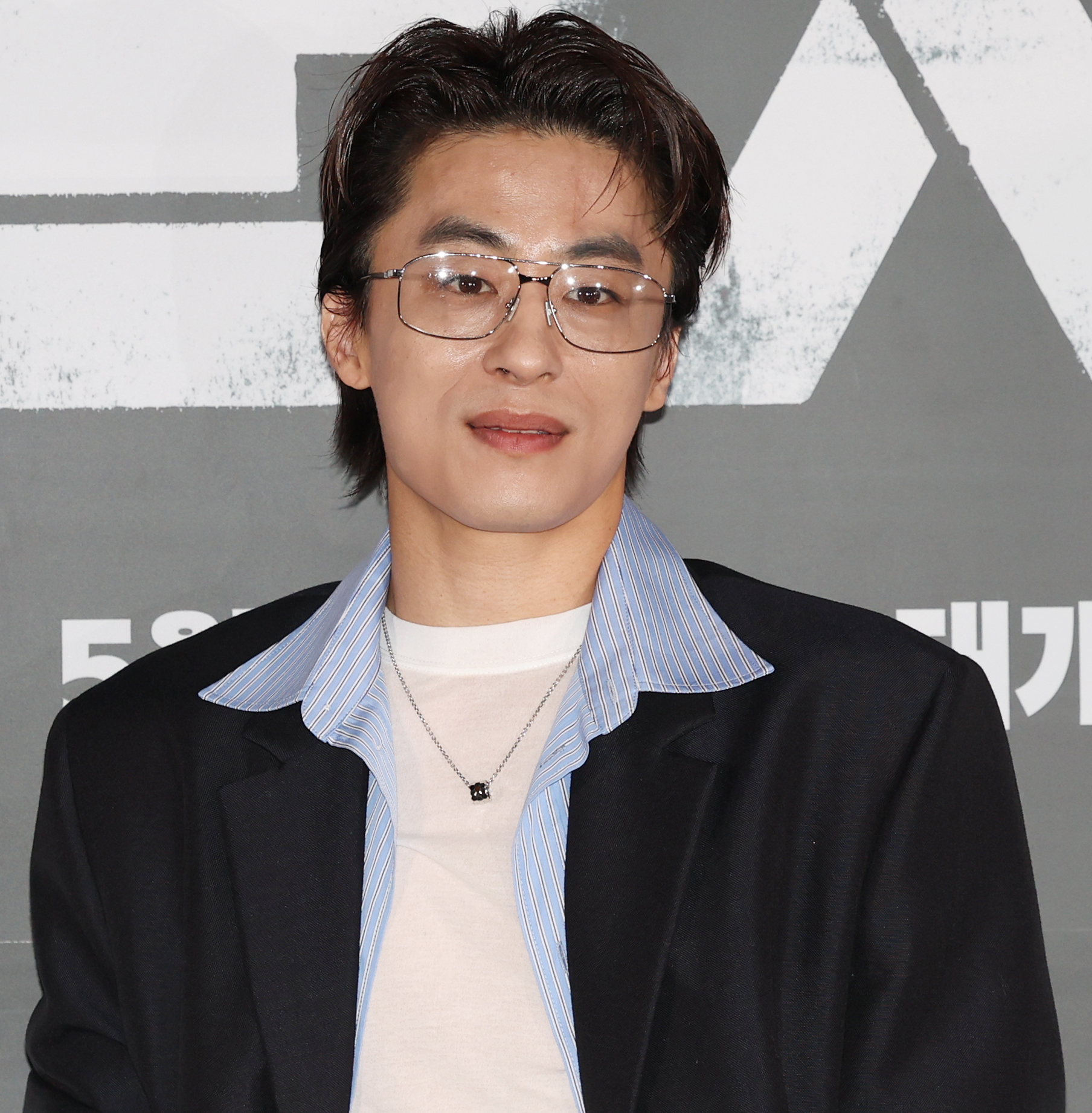
- Koo in 2026
- Born: December 14, 1982 (age 43); Seoul, South Korea
- Education: Seoul Institute of the Arts
- Occupations: Actor; film director
- Years active: 2006–present
- Agent: Namoo Actors
- Spouse: Lee Ok-seop (m. 2022)

Korean name
- Hangul: 구교환
- Hanja: 具敎煥
- RR: Gu Gyohwan
- MR: Ku Kyohwan
- Website: namooactors.com

Koo Kyo-hwan (Korean: 구교환; born December 14, 1982) is a South Korean actor and filmmaker. He first gained recognition for his performances in the films Jane (2016) and Maggie (2018), before achieving wider recognition with Peninsula (2020), Escape from Mogadishu (2021), and the Netflix original D.P. (2021–2023).

Koo subsequently starred in the films Kill Boksoon (2023), Escape (2024), and Once We Were Us (2025), as well as the Netflix series Parasyte: The Grey (2024). In 2026, he appeared in the film Colony and starred in the television series We Are All Trying Here.

== Early life and education ==
Koo Kyo-hwan was born on December 14, 1982, and raised in Isu, Dongjak-gu, Seoul. His father is a photographer who operated a photo studio in Bangbae-dong for three decades. In his school records, Koo was noted for a talent for comedy, which led to early ambitions to become a comedian. He later expanded his interests to acting and broadcasting, eventually pursuing careers as an actor, comedian, and television personality.

While Koo originally planned to major in acting at the Seoul Institute of the Arts, he applied to the film department because he was unaware of the theater department existence. His training in directing, cinematography, producing, and editing subsequently increased his interest in filmmaking, which became a stronger focus than acting.

== Career ==
=== Career beginnings (2008–2015) ===
Koo made his acting debut in the 2008 short film Boys, directed by his Seoul Institute of the Arts peer Yoon Sung-hyun. In the film, he portrayed a high school student with a specialized interest in kite-making. That same year, he appeared in a minor role as a utility worker in Castaway on the Moon.

He began to garner attention for both his acting and directing after winning the Ting-Geurang Coin Award at the Jeongdongjin Independent Film Festival for his 2011 film Turtles, which he also directed. In 2014, he served as the director, screenwriter, producer, editor, and lead actor for the segment "Dating Documentary" within omnibus film Now Playing, the opening feature of the Seoul Independent Film Festival.

=== Critical recognition in independent films (2016–2019) ===
In 2016, Koo starred alongside Lee Min-ji in Cho Hyun-hoon's independent film Jane. He portrayed the title character, a transgender woman. To prepare for the role, Koo lost 10 kilograms and developed a distinctive high-pitched vocal delivery. His performance earned him Actor of the Year at the Busan International Film Festival and the Best New Actor Award at the 54th Baeksang Arts Awards. That same year, he won the Grand Prize in the Domestic Competition at the Asiana International Short Film Festival for Fly to the Sky, a project he co-directed and starred in.

Koo continued to establish a unique presence in the industry through his collaborations with director Lee Ok-seop. For the 2018 film Maggie, he served as the producer, screenwriter, editor, and lead actor. The film received significant acclaim, winning the Audience Award at the 44th Seoul Independent Film Festival, the CGV Art House Award at the Busan International Film Festival, and the KBS Independent Film Award.

In the summer of 2019, while planning to attend the Taiwan Film Festival, Koo and director Lee Ok-seop discussed the trip at Gyeongui Line Forest Park in Yeonnam-dong. The experience of falling asleep in the park and waking up at sunset reportedly served as the inspiration for the film Romeo: The Sin of Having Eyes.

=== Transition to commercial film (2020–Present) ===
Koo's first major role in a commercial production was Captain Seo in Yeon Sang-ho's 2020 film Peninsula. The director initially doubted Koo's suitability for commercial cinema but cast him after a personal meeting. Yeon later noted that Koo's interpretation added complexity to a character that might otherwise have been a conventional villain. His performance in the blockbuster garnered significant public and critical attention.

== Personal life ==
Koo has been in a long-term relationship with director Lee Ok-seop since 2013. The two are fellow alums of the Seoul Institute of the Arts and began dating after Koo appeared in one of Lee's film projects. The pair co-manages 2x9HD, their YouTube channel, on which they showcase their creative collaborations. The channel features co-directed short films, experimental works, and vlogs documenting unique or overlooked aspects of daily life. In October 2026, their agency confirmed they married in 2022.

== Filmography ==
=== Endorsements ===
Year	Company / Brand	Product / Campaign	Ref.
2021	Musinsa	Brand Ambassador (Fall/Winter Season)	
2021	Musinsa	Brand Ambassador (Fall/Winter Season)	
2021	Subway	Ultra Cheese Campaign	
2022	Metrocity	Brand Ambassador (Spring/Summer Campaign)	
2022	Primera (Amorepacific)	Men in the Pink Campaign	
2022	Malboeoca (e-booster)	Brand Model	
2024	Lotte Chilsung	Chum Churum (Soju)	
2024	Chong Kun Dang	Kkenoni Thank You Shot	
2026	Brooks Brothers	Spring/Summer Season Brand Model	
2026	Dongwon F&B	Yangban (Yangban 100-Bab)	

=== As actor ===
==== Film ====
Key
†	Denotes films that have not yet been released

Year	Title	Role	Notes	Ref.
2008	Boys	Gyo-hwan	Short film	
2009	Just Before They Died	Do-young	Short film	
2009	Castaway on the Moon	Utilities man 1	Bit part	
2009	Don't Step Out Of The House	Ra-oh	Short film	
2012	Winter Sleep	Gu-byeong	Short film	
2012	A Werewolf Boy	Drunk man	Bit part	
2013	Where is My DVD?	Gi-hwan	Short film	
2013	Welcome to My Home	Gyo-hwan	Short film	
2014	A Dangerous Woman	Duk-woo	Short film (First collaboration with Lee Ok-seop)	
2014	Dempsey Roll: A Confession	Gyo-hwan	Short film	
2014	We Called Him Heeya	Gi-tae	Short film	
2015	Now Playing Episode 3: Love Docu	Goo Gyo-hwan	Omnibus Film	
2015	Robot Revival	Jong-pil	Short film	
2015	Romance in Seoul Episode 3. Fly to the Sky	Gi-cheol / Gyo-hwan	Omnibus Film	
2016	Dishonor	Jeong-hoon	Short film	
2016	Beaten Black and Blue	Gyo-hwan		
2017	Jane	Jane		
2018	Leave a Message After Beep	Animal Communicator	Short film	
2018	Maggie	Lee Sung-won		
2019	Romeo: The Sin of Having Eyes	Romeo	Short film	
2020	Peninsula	Captain Seo		
2021	Escape from Mogadishu	Tae Joon-gi		
2022	Super Star Lee Hyo-ri	eldest brother	Short film	
2022	Love Villain	Gyo-hwan	Short film	
2023	Kill Boksoon	Han Hee-seong		
2024	Escape	Ri Hyeon-sang		
2025	Once We Were Us	Lee Eun-ho		
2026	Colony	Seo Young-cheol		
2026	Reawaken Man: The Red	Seok Hwan		
2026	Paradise Lost	Server	Cameo	
2026	White Blast	Hyun-taek		
2027	Typhoon †	Jin-mo		
TBA	Seeking the King †	Kim Do-jin		

==== Television ====
Year	Title	Role	Notes	Ref.
2016	Dance From Afar	Sin Pa-rang	Drama Special	
2021	Kingdom: Ashin of the North	Ai Da Gan	Special episode	
2021–2023	D.P.	Han Ho-yul	Season 1–2	
2022	Monstrous	Jeong Ki-hoon		
2022	Extraordinary Attorney Woo	Bang Gu-ppong	Cameo (episode 9)	
2023	One Day Off	Lee Chang-jin	Cameo (episode 3)	
2024	Parasyte: The Grey	Seol Kang-woo		
2026	We Are All Trying Here	Hwang Dong-man		

=== As filmmaker ===
Year	Title	Credited as				Notes	Ref.
Year	Title	Director	Writer	Editor	Producer	Notes	Ref.
2011	Turtles	Yes	Yes	Yes	No	Short film; Acting	
2013	Play Tag	Yes (Note: Teamed with Ji Yeon-tae and Kim Young-kwan)	Yes	No	No	Short film	
2013	Welcome to My Home	Yes	No	No	No	Acting	
2013	Boy's Night	No	No	No	No		
2014	Where is My DVD?	Yes	Yes	Yes	Yes	Costumes, Art Direction, Acting	
2014	A Dangerous Woman	No	No	Yes	No	Acting	
2014	We Called Him Heeya	No	No	Yes	No	Acting	
2014	Now Playing Ep. 3. Love Docu	Yes	Yes	Yes	Yes	Cinematography, Acting	
2015	Romance in Seoul Ep. Fly to the Sky	Yes (Note: Teamed with Lee Ok-sup)	Yes	Yes	Yes	Omnibus film; also credited as director of the trailer, CG, and acting	
2015	After School	Yes	Yes	Yes	Yes	—N/a	
2016	Beaten Black and Blue (Great Patrioteers)	No	No	No	No	Acting	
2017	Girls on Top	Yes	Yes	Yes	No	Costumes	
2018	Leave a Message After Beep (Three)	No	Yes	Yes	Yes	Acting	
2019	Maggie	No	Yes	Yes	Yes	Acting	
2019	Romeo: The Sin of Having Eyes	No	No	Yes	Yes	Short film, Acting	
2021	Film Director Koo Kyo-hwan's Vlog	Yes	No	Yes	Yes (Note: Teamed with Lee Jun-seok and Ok-seop)	Short film, Acting	
2022	Replacement Driver Vlog	Yes	Yes	Yes	No	Acting	
2022	Super Star Lee Hyo-ri	Yes	Adaptation	Yes	Yes	Acting	
2024	Jinx Montage	Yes	Yes	Yes	No	50th Seoul Independent Film Festival opening video; acting	
TBA	Your Country	Yes	Yes	Yes	Yes	Acting	

== Music videos ==
Year	Title	Artist(s)	Ref.
2024	"UP!"	Balming Tiger	
2025	"Rich Man"	Aespa	

== Theater ==
Year	Title		Role	Theater	Date	Ref.
Year	English	Korean	Role	Theater	Date	Ref.
2018	Doosan Humanities Theater 2018 Altruism - Nassim	두산인문극장 2018 이타주의자 - 낫심	Actor	Doosan Art Center Space111	April 10–29	

== Accolades ==
=== Awards and nominations ===
Name of the award ceremony, year presented, category, nominee of the award, and the result of the nomination
Award ceremony	Year	Category	Nominee / Work	Result	Ref.
APAN Star Awards	2022	Excellence Award, Actor in an OTT Drama	D.P.	Nominated	
Asiana International Short Film Festival	2016	Grand Prize (Domestic competition)	Fly to the Sky	Won	
Annual Plus	2021	Annual Awards Stars Who Shined in 2021 — Trending Actor Chungmuro	Koo Kyo-hwan	Won	
Baeksang Arts Awards	2018	Best New Actor – Film	Jane	Won	
Baeksang Arts Awards	2021	Best Supporting Actor – Film	Peninsula	Nominated	
Baeksang Arts Awards	2022	Best Supporting Actor – Film	Escape from Mogadishu	Nominated	
Baeksang Arts Awards	2022	Best New Actor – Television	D.P.	Won	
Baeksang Arts Awards	2025	Best Supporting Actor – Film	Escape	Nominated	
Baeksang Arts Awards	2026	Best Actor – Film	Once We Were Us	Nominated	
Blue Dragon Film Awards	2017	Best New Actor	Jane	Nominated	
Blue Dragon Film Awards	2021	Best Supporting Actor	Escape from Mogadishu	Nominated	
Blue Dragon Film Awards	2021	Popular Star Award	Escape from Mogadishu	Won	
Blue Dragon Film Awards	2024	Popular Star Award	Escape	Won	
Blue Dragon Film Awards	2026	Best Actor	Once We Were Us	Pending	
Blue Dragon Film Awards	2026	Best Supporting Actor	Colony	Pending	
Blue Dragon Series Awards	2022	Best New Actor	D.P.	Won	
Brands of the Year (Note: Hosted by the Korea Consumer Brand Committee and the Korea Consumer Forum, the Korea First Brand Awards selected its winners based on a nationwide South Korean survey. Annually, every September, the awards ceremony recognizes outstanding brands across various industries.)	2024	Male actor (OTT)	D.P.	Won	
Buil Film Awards	2017	Best New Actor	Jane	Won	
Buil Film Awards	2020	Best Supporting Actor	Peninsula	Nominated	
Buil Film Awards	2021	Best Supporting Actor	Escape from Mogadishu	Nominated	
Buil Film Awards	2026	Best Actor	Once We Were Us	Nominated	
Busan Film Critics Awards	2017	Best New Actor	Jane	Won	
Busan International Film Festival	2016	Actor of the Year	Jane	Won	
Busan International Short Film Festival	2014	Busan Cinephile Awards	Where is My DVD?	Won	
Chunsa Film Art Awards	2017	Best New Actor	Beaten Black and Blue	Won	
Chunsa Film Art Awards	2018	Best Supporting Actor	Jane	Nominated	
Chunsa Film Art Awards	2021	Best Supporting Actor	Peninsula	Nominated	
Chunsa Film Art Awards	2022	Best Supporting Actor	Escape from Mogadishu	Nominated	
Cine21 Film Awards	2016	New Actor of the Year	Beaten Black and Blue	Won	
Cine21 Film Awards	2021	Series actor of the Year	D.P. Kingdom: Ashin of the North	Won	
Director's Cut Awards	2019	Best New Actor	Maggie	Nominated	
Director's Cut Awards	2022	Best Actor in series	D.P.	Won	
Director's Cut Awards	2022	Best New Actor in series	D.P.	Nominated	
Director's Cut Awards	2022	Best New Actor in film	Peninsula	Won	
Dong-A.com's Pick (Note: Award winners are selected by Dong-a Ilbo entertainment reporters.)	2017	Acknowledged? Yeah, Acknowledged!	Jane	Won	
Great Short Film Festival	2015	Great Audience Award - Best Poster	After School Tea Time Returns	Won	
Kino Lights Awards	2021	Actor of The Year (Domestic)	Escape from Mogadishu; Kingdom: Ashin of the North	1st place	
Jeongdongjin Independent Film Festival	2011	Ding-Dong Coin Award	Turtle	Won	
Korea First Brand Awards (Note: Hosted by the Korea Consumer Brand Committee and the Korea Consumer Forum, the Korea First Brand Awards based its winners on a nationwide South Korean survey.)	2025	Male actor (film)	Escape	Won	
Mise-en-scène Film Festival	2014	Best Work Award in the King of Comedy (Comedy) category	Where is My DVD?	Won	
Seoul International Drama Awards	2026	International Competition — Best Actor	We Are All Trying Here	Nominated	
Seoul International Drama Awards	2026	Outstanding Korean Actor	We Are All Trying Here	Won	
Wildflower Film Awards	2017	Best New Actor	Beaten Black and Blue	Nominated	

=== Listicles ===
Name of publisher, year listed, name of listicle, and placement
Publisher	Year	Listicle	Placement	Ref.
Cine21	2010	Chungmuro Palpal Generation 50	Included	
Cine21	2020	Actors to watch out for in 2021	6th (Note: Koo Kyo-hwan mentioned together with, Kang Dong-won, Kang Ha-neul, Gong Yoo, Yim Si-wan, Kim Soo-hyun, Kim Woo-bin, Ryu Seung-ryong, Park Jeong-min, Byun Yo-han, Song Kang, Song Kang-ho, Teo Yoo, Lee Je-hoon, Jung Sung-hwa, Jung Woo-sung, Son Suk-ku, Hyun Bin)	
Cine21	2021	Actors to watch out for in 2022	1st	
Cine21	2023	Actors to watch out for in 2023	3rd	
Cine21	2024	Actors to watch out for in 2024	2nd (Note: Tied with Hwang Jung-min)	
Cine21	2024	Next Korean Movie Actor	Included	
Cine21	2026	Actors to watch out for in 2026	1st	
Joy News 24	2021	Best Actor of the Year	3rd	
Korean Film Council	2021	Korean Actors 200 (Note: Introduces 200 actors that best represent the present and future of Korean cinema to the people in the film industry all over the world.)	Included	
Sisa Journal (Note: Sisa Journal Next Generation Leader-Society was founded by Sisa Journal in 2008.)	2021	Next Generation Leaders - Culture & Arts	Included	
