= Myung Films =

South Korean film production and distribution company

Myung Film Co., Ltd.
- Native name: 명필름
- Company type: Private
- Industry: film
- Founded: 1995
- Headquarters: Jongno District, Seoul, South Korea
- Area served: South Korea
- Key people: Sim Jae-myung (CEO)
- Services: distribution, film production
- Website: myungfilm.com

Myung Film Co., Ltd. (Korean: 명필름) is a South Korean film production and distribution company. It has produced and distributed many films since 2002.

== History ==
The company was established in South Korea by Shim Jae-myung, and has distributed films throughout South Korea since its founding in September 1995. In 2004, it merged with Kang Je-gyu Films, forming a joint-venture distribution label, MK Pictures.

== Productions ==
The institute's first feature film In Between Seasons (2016) was directed by first-time director Lee Dong-eun who graduated from its first Film Directing major graduating class. In Between Seasons was screened in the New Currents section at the 21st Busan International Film Festival where it won the KNN Award. Lee went on to make his second feature, the critically acclaimed Mothers (2017) which won the NETPAC Award at the 2018 Vesoul International Film Festival of Asian Cinema.
