= One Sentence Is Ten Thousand Sentences =

Chinese novel by Liu Zhenyun

One Sentence Is Ten Thousand Sentences is a novel written by Liu Zhenyun from 2006 to 2008. It was awarded the Mao Dun Literature Prize in 2011.

It depicts the futility of a search for love among a group of lower class people over the span of two generations. Although the character's lives are boisterous, they experience profound loneliness.

The phrase "One Sentence for ten thousand sentences" frames the novel and is a quotation from Lin Biao shortly before the beginning of the Cultural Revolution.

The novel has been adapted into a 2016 film Someone to Talk To, directed by Liu Zhenyun's daughter Liu Yulin.
