= In Between Seasons =

- Theatrical poster
- Hangul: 환절기
- RR: Hwanjeolgi
- MR: Hwanjŏlgi
- Directed by: Lee Dong-eun
- Screenplay by: Lee Dong-eun
- Based on: a comic book by Lee Dong-eun
- Produced by: Kim Ji-young
- Starring: Bae Jong-ok; Lee Won-keun; Ji Yoon-ho
- Cinematography: Lee Kun-sol
- Edited by: Oh Byeong-joo
- Music by: Lee In-gyeong
- Production company: Myung Films
- Distributed by: Little Big Pictures
- Release dates: October 2016 (BIFF); February 22, 2018 (South Korea)
- Running time: 101 minutes
- Country: South Korea
- Language: Korean
- Box office: US$48,431

In Between Seasons (Korean: 환절기; RR: Hwanjeolgi) is a 2016 South Korean drama film directed by first-time director Lee Dong-eun. The film is a remake of his own graphic novel. It made its world premiere at the 21st Busan International Film Festival and won KNN Award.

== Synopsis ==
Soo-hyun (Ji Yoon-ho) is in a coma after an accident while on a trip with Yong-joon (Lee Won-keun). His mother Mi-kyung (Bae Jong-ok) soon discovers that his close friend Yong-joon is actually his boyfriend.

== Cast ==
- Bae Jong-ok as Mi-kyung
- Lee Won-keun as Yong-joon
- Ji Yoon-ho as Soo-hyun
- Park Won-sang as Jin-gyu
- Seo Jeong-yeon as Hee-yeong
- Woo Ji-hyun as Han-sung
- Kim Ye-eun as Ji-yeon
- Kwon Dong-ho as Kyung-joon
- Kim Ja-young as Geum-sun
- Baek Ji-won as Sook-jung
- Park Hye-jin as Ms Park
- Kim In-kwon as Manager Lee
- Bae Yong-geun as Homeroom teacher

== Awards and nominations ==
Year	Award	Category	Nominee	Result
2016	21st Busan International Film Festival	New Currents Award	In Between Seasons	Nominated
2016	21st Busan International Film Festival	KNN Award	In Between Seasons	Won
2017	5th QCinema International Film Festival	Pylon Award for Best Picture – Asian Next Wave	In Between Seasons	Nominated
