= Ji Yoon-ho =

South Korean actor

- Born: Yoon Byung-ho; March 16, 1991 (age 35); Busan, South Korea
- Education: Chung-Ang University – Department of Theater
- Occupation: Actor
- Years active: 2011–present
- Agent: Huayi Brothers

Korean name
- Hangul: 윤병호
- Hanja: 尹炳護
- RR: Yun Byeongho
- MR: Yun Pyŏngho

Stage name
- Hangul: 지윤호
- RR: Ji Yunho
- MR: Chi Yunho

Ji Yoon-ho (born Yoon Byung-ho; March 16, 1991) is a South Korean actor.

== Filmography ==
=== Television series ===
Year	Title	Role	Ref.
2011	Bolder By the Day	Cha Min-gook	
2012	Faith	Ji-ho	
2014	High School King of Savvy	Park Gi-hoon	
2015	Girls' Love Story	Yoon Ho	
2016	Cheese in the Trap	Oh Young-gon	
2016	Sweet Stranger and Me	Lee Yong-gyoo	
2017	Argon	Oh Seung-yong	
2018	Marry Me Now	Han Tae-soo	

=== Films ===
Year	Title	Role	Ref.
2015	Love Clinic	Ahn Gong-joo's high school student	
2016	Like for Likes	Jae-byung	
2016	In Between Seasons	Soo-hyun	
2019	Warning: Do Not Play	Kim Joon-seo	
