= 21st Busan International Film Festival =

2016 edition of film festival

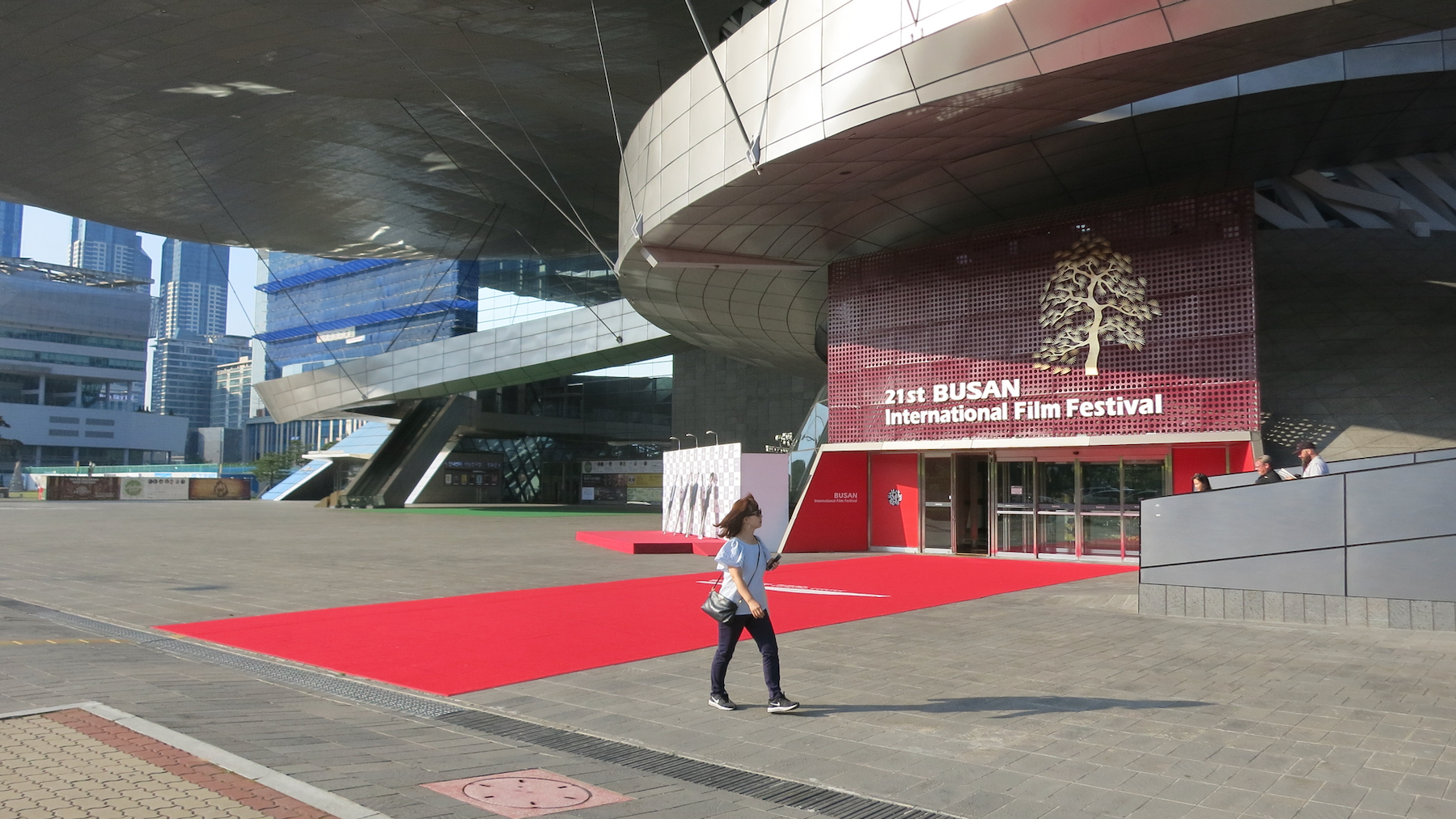
- Opening film: A Quiet Dream
- Closing film: The Dark Wind
- Location: Busan Cinema Center
- Founded: 1995
- Hosted by: Sul Kyung-gu; Han Hyo-joo
- Festival date: Opening: October 6, 2016; Closing: October 15, 2016

Busan International Film Festival
- 22nd 20th

The 21st Busan International Film Festival was held from October 6 to October 15, 2016 at the Busan Cinema Center and was hosted by Sul Kyung-gu and Han Hyo-joo. A total of 301 films from 69 countries were screened at the festival, including 96 world premieres and 27 international premieres.

A new Vision-Director Award was given to two promising directors of newly produced independent films in the Korean Cinema Today-Vision section, who have shown the most outstanding production skills. The winner will get a cash prize reward of 5,000 USD sponsored by MEGABOX.

Five major South Korean domestic filmmakers' groups, including the Producers' Guild of Korea and the Directors' Guild of Korea, have boycotted this year's festival over a bitter dispute with the municipal government of Busan since the screening in 2014 of a controversial documentary about the Sewol ferry disaster in spite of the opposition from Busan mayor and BIFF organizing committee Chairman Suh Byung-soo.

== Program ==
=== Opening ===
- A Quiet Dream - Zhang Lü (Korea)

=== Gala Presentation ===
- Bleed for This - Ben Younger (United States)
- Daguerrotype - Kiyoshi Kurosawa (France/Belgium/Japan)
- Rage - Lee Sang-il (Japan)
- Your Name - Makoto Shinkai (Japan)

=== A Window on Asian Cinema ===
- #BKKY - Nontawat Numbenchapol (Thailand)
- Reward - Kamal Tabrizi (Iran)
- The Nights of Zayandeh-rood - Mohsen Makhmalbaf (Iran/United Kingdom)
- 4+1 - Farkhat SHARIPOV (Kazakhstan)
- 500M800M - YAO Tian (Hong Kong, China)
- A Death in the Gunj - Konkona Sen Sharma (India)
- A Gas Station - Tanwarin SUKKHAPISIT (Thailand)
- A Lullaby to the Sorrowful Mystery - Lav Diaz (Philippines)
- A Woman from Java - Garin Nugroho (Indonesia)
- A Yellow Bird - K. Rajagopal (Singapore/France)
- Apprentice - Boo Junfeng (Singapore/France/Germany/Hong Kong, China/Qatar)
- Bangkok Nites - TOMITA Katsuya (Japan/France/Thailand/Laos)
- Blessed Benefit - Mahmoud AL MASSAD (Germany/Jordan/Netherlands/Qatar)
- By the Time It Gets Dark - Anocha Suwichakornpong (Thailand/Netherlands/France/Qatar)
- Chronicles of Hari - Ananya Kasaravalli (India)
- Desperate Sunflowers - Hitomi Kuroki (Japan)
- Diamond Island - Davy Chou (Cambodia/France/Germany/Thailand/Qatar)
- Duck Neck - WEI Shujun (China)
- Emma' (Mother) - Riri Riza (Indonesia)
- Expressway - Ato Bautista (Philippines)
- Fan - Maneesh Sharma (India/Croatia)
- Ghashang & Farang - Vahid MOUSAIAN (Iran)
- Happiness - Sabu (Japan/Germany)
- Harmonium - FUKADA Koji (Japan/France)
- Hema Hema: Sing Me a Song While I Wait - Khyentse Norbu (Bhutan)
- Her Love Boils Bathwater - NAKANO Ryota (Japan)
- Honeygiver Among the Dogs - Dechen RODER (Bhutan)
- Hotel Salvation - Shubhashish BHUTIANI (India)
- Lost Daughter - CHEN Yu-Jie (Taiwan)
- Ma' Rosa - Brillante Mendoza (Philippines)
- Madaari - Nishikant Kamat (India)
- Malaria - Parviz Shahbazi (Iran)
- Mi Amor - Suman Ghosh (United States/India)
- Mrs K - HO Yuhang (Malaysia/Hong Kong, China)
- Muhammad: The Messenger of God - Majid Majidi (Iran)
- My Egg Boy - FU Sola Tien-yu (Taiwan)
- One Night Only - Matt Wu (China)
- Over the Fence - Nobuhiro Yamashita (Japan)
- Revelations - Vijay Jayapal (India)
- Singing in Graveyards - Bradley LIEW (Malaysia/Philippines)
- Solo, Solitude - Yosep Anggi NOEN (Indonesia)
- Soul on a String - Zhang Yang (China)
- Suffering of Ninko - NIWATSUKINO Norihiro (Japan)
- Tam Cam: The Untold Story - Ngô Thanh Vân (Vietnam)
- The Bait - Buddhadeb Dasgupta (India)
- The City of Mirrors: A Fictional Biography - TRUONG Minh Quy (Vietnam)
- The Dream of Water - Farhad MEHRANFAR (Iran)
- The Long Excuse - Miwa Nishikawa (Japan)
- The Road to Mandalay - Midi Z (Taiwan/France/Germany/Myanmar)
- The Salesman - Asghar Farhadi (Iran/France)
- Three - Johnnie To (Hong Kong, China/China)
- Travelling with the Bomb - Nurlan ABDYKADYROV (Kyrgyzstan)
- Violinist - Mohammad Ali TALEBI (Iran)
- Wandering - Boonsong NAKPHOO (Thailand)
- White Sun - Deepak RAUNIYAR (Nepal)
- Woven Wings of Our Children - Anton JUAN (Philippines)

=== New Currents ===
- A Billion Colour Story - Padmakumar NARASIMHAMURTHY (India)
- Burning Birds - Sanjeewa Pushpakumara (France/Sri Lanka/Qatar/ The Netherlands)
- Her Mother - SATO Yoshinori (Japan)
- In Between Seasons - Lee Dong-eun (Korea)
- Knife in the Clear Water - WANG Xuebo (China)
- Lady of the Lake - Haobam PABAN KUMAR (India)
- Merry Christmas Mr. Mo - Lim Dae-hyung (Korea)
- Parting - Navid MAHMOUDI (Iran/Afghanistan)
- Someone to Talk To - Liu Yulin (China/Hong Kong, China)
- The Donor - ZANG Qiwu (China)
- White Ant - CHU Hsien-Che (Taiwan)

=== Korean Cinema Today - Panorama ===
- Coffee Mate - YI Hyun-ha (Korea)
- Derailed (a.k.a. No Way To Go) - LEE Seong-tae (Korea)
- Fatal Intuition - YUN Jun-hyeong (Korea)
- Inside Men - Woo Min-ho (Korea)
- Road to Utah - KIM Jeong-jung (Korea/United States)
- SORI: Voice from the Heart - Lee Ho-jae (Korea)
- The Age of Shadows - Kim Jee-woon (Korea)
- The Bacchus Lady - E J-yong (Korea)
- The Handmaiden - Park Chan-wook (Korea)
- The Last Princess - Hur Jin-ho (Korea)
- The Map Against the World - Kang Woo-suk (Korea)
- The Net - Kim Ki-duk (Korea)
- The Priests - Jang Jae-hyun (Korea)
- The Table - Kim Jong-kwan (Korea)
- The Truth Beneath - Lee Kyoung-mi (Korea)
- The Wailing - Na Hong-jin (Korea/United States)
- The World of Us - YOON Ga-eun (Korea)

=== Korean Cinema Today - Vision ===
- Autumn, Autumn - JANG Woo-jin (Korea)
- Baby Beside Me - SON Tae-gyum (Korea)
- Come, Together - Shin Dong-il (Korea)
- Hyeon's Quartet - AHN Seon-kyoung (Korea)
- Jamsil - LEE Wanmin (Korea)
- Jane - CHO Hyunhoon (Korea)
- Lost to Shame - Nam Yeon-woo (Korea)
- Picture of Hell - PARK Ki-yong (Korea/Japan)
- Second Winter - KIM Euigon (Korea)
- The Noises - MIN Je-hong (Korea)
- Yongsoon - SHIN Joon - (Korea)

=== Korean Cinema Retrospective ===
==== Lee Doo-yong: The Pathfinder of Korean Genre Films ====
- Eunuch - Lee Doo-yong (Korea)
- Manchurian Tiger - Lee Doo-yong (Korea)
- Police Story - Lee Doo-yong (Korea)
- Spinning the Tales of Cruelty Towards Women - Lee Doo-yong (Korea)
- The Early Years - Lee Doo-yong (Korea)
- The Hut - Lee Doo-yong (Korea)
- The Last Witness - Lee Doo-yong (Korea)
- The Oldest Son - Lee Doo-yong (Korea)

=== World Cinema ===
- A Possible Life - Ivano De Matteo (Italy/France)
- A Woman's Life - Stéphane Brizé (France)
- Afterimage - Andrzej Wajda (Poland)
- Aquarius - Kleber Mendonça Filho (Brazil)
- Arrival - Denis Villeneuve (United States)
- Boys in the Trees - Nicholas VERSO (Australia)
- Brightness - Souleymane Cissé (Mali)
- Brooks, Meadows and Lovely Faces - Yousry Nasrallah (Egypt)
- Clair Obscur - Yeşim Ustaoğlu (Turkey/Germany/Poland/France)
- Death in Sarajevo - Danis Tanović (Bosnia and Herzegovina/France)
- Egon Schiele: Death and the Maiden - Dieter BERNER (Austria/Luxembourg)
- Endless Poetry - Alejandro Jodorowsky (Chile/France)
- Epifanía - Oscar RUIZ NAVIA, Anna EBORN (Colombia/Sweden/Denmark)
- Foreign Body - Raja Amari (France/Tunisia)
- Frantz - François Ozon (France/Germany)
- From the Land of the Moon - Nicole Garcia (France)
- Heaven Will Wait - Marie-Castille MENTION-SCHAAR (France)
- I, Daniel Blake - Ken Loach (United Kingdom)
- It's Not the Time of My Life - Szabolcs HAJDU (Hungary)
- It's Only the End of the World - Xavier Dolan (Canada/France)
- Julieta - Pedro Almodóvar (Spain/United States)
- King of the Belgians - Peter BROSENS, Jessica WOODWORTH (Belgium/Netherlands/Bulgaria)
- Koblic - Sebastián Borensztein (Spain/Argentina)
- La La Land - Damien Chazelle (United States)
- May God Save Us - Rodrigo SOROGOYEN (Spain)
- Monte - Amir Naderi (Italy/United States/France)
- Original Bliss - Sven TADDICKEN (Germany)
- Other People - Chris Kelly (United States)
- Paterson - Jim Jarmusch (United States)
- Personal Shopper - Olivier Assayas (France)
- Scarred Hearts - Radu Jude (Romania/Germany)
- Sieranevada - Cristi Puiu (Romania)
- Sweet Dreams - Marco Bellocchio (Italy/France)
- The Death of Louis XIV - Albert Serra (France/Portugal/Spain)
- The Distinguished Citizen - Gastón Duprat & Mariano Cohn (Argentina/Spain)
- The Oath - Baltasar Kormákur (Iceland)
- The Ornithologist - João Pedro Rodrigues (France/Portugal/Brazil)
- The Reconquest - Jonás TRUEBA (Spain)
- The Teacher - Jan Hřebejk (Slovak Republic/Czech Republic)
- The Together Project - Sólveig Anspach (France/Iceland)
- Toni Erdmann - Maren Ade (Germany)
- United States of Love - Tomasz Wasilewski (Poland/Sweden)

=== Flash Forward ===
- 1:54 - Yan England (Canada)
- A Pact Among Angels - Richard ANGERS (Canada)
- Aloys - Tobias NÖLLE (Switzerland/France)
- Amerika Square - Yannis SAKARIDIS (Greece/United Kingdom/Germany)
- As You Are - Miles JORIS-PEYRAFITTE (United States)
- Bad Girl - Fin EDQUIST (Australia)
- Between Worlds - Miya HATAV (Israel)
- Bonfire - Dmitry Davydov (Russia)
- Fräulein - A winter’s tale - Caterina CARONE (Italy)
- Glory - Kristina GROZEVA, Petar VALCHANOV (Bulgaria/Greece)
- Godless - Ralitza PETROVA (Bulgaria/Denmark/France)
- Heartstone - Guðmundur ARNAR GUðMUNDSSON (Iceland/Denmark)
- Hounds of Love - Ben YOUNG (Australia)
- Maria and Everybody Else - Nely REGUERA (Spain)
- Marija - Michael Koch (Germany/Switzerland)
- Mimosas - Oliver Laxe (Spain/France/Morocco/Qatar)
- Night of a 1000 Hours - Virgil Widrich (Luxembourg/Austria/Netherlands)
- One Week and a Day - Asaph POLONSKY (Israel)
- Starfish - Bill CLARK (United Kingdom)
- The Bear Skin - Marco SEGATO (Italy)
- The Dancer - Stéphanie Di Giusto (France)
- The Empty Box - Claudia SAINTE-LUCE (Mexico/France)
- The Giant - Johannes NYHOLM (Sweden/Denmark)
- The Happiest Day in the Life of Olli Mäki - Juho Kuosmanen (Finland/Germany/Sweden)
- The Idea of a Lake - Milagros MUMENTHALER (Argentina/Switzerland/Qatar)
- The Long Night of Francisco Sanctis - Francisco MARQUEZ, Andrea TESTA (Argentina)
- The Poisoning Angel - Stephanie PILLONCA (France/Belgium)
- The Saint - Andrius BLAZEVICIUS (Lithuania/Poland)
- The Unseen - Perivi KATJAVIVI (Namibia)
- Una - Benedict Andrews (United Kingdom)
- We are the Tide - Sebastian HILGER (Germany)
- Wolf and Sheep - Shahrbanoo SADAT (Denmark/France/Sweden/Afghanistan)
- Worldly Girl - Marco DANIELI (Italy/France)
- Worlds Apart - Christopher Papakaliatis (Greece)
- Zoology - Ivan I. TVERDOVSKY (Russia/France/Germany)

=== Wide Angle ===
==== Korean Short Film Competition ====
- Confessions - KIM Woo-hyun (Korea)
- Family Plan - CHUNG Jiyun (Korea)
- Heart On Fire - SUN Jonghoon (Korea)
- Her Secret Day - JUNG Inbong (Korea)
- Here with Me - Antoine AHN (Korea)
- Missing - YOO Dong-gyu (Korea)
- Mom's Rice Ball - YOO Yong-ji (Korea)
- Parade - NA Jihyun (Korea)
- Sleepless Night - HUR Jung-jae (Korea)
- The Bird Fights Its Way Out of The Egg - CHO Changgeun (Korea)
- The Boy is with Us - YOON Heewon (Korea)
- The Distance between Us - LEE Jung-gon (Korea)
- The Girl Burying Bodies - CHUN Juyoung (Korea)
- The Master : An Ordinary Man - YUN Puhui (Korea)
- The Noodle - KIM Sujin (Korea)
- Viewer - KIM Soyoun (Korea)

==== Asian Short Film Competition ====
- A Little Tiger - Nutthapon RAKKHATHAM (Thailand)
- Memoria - Kamila Andini (Indonesia/East Timor)
- Night-Fly - Aziz ZHAMBAKIYEV (Kazakhstan)
- Off-season - Yelzat ESKENDIR (Kazakhstan)
- Pain in Silence - LI Yujian (China)
- Supot - Phil GIORDANO (Philippines/United States)
- The Doomed Way - GUO Sanpi (China)
- The Limit - Sonia SAHARAN (India)
- The Robe - Wera AUNG (Myanmar)
- Year of the Bird - Shenang Gyamjo TAMANG (Nepal)

==== Short Film Showcase ====
- Art Through Our Eyes - Eric Khoo, HO Yuhang, Joko Anwar, Apichatpong Weerasethakul, Brillante Mendoza (Singapore/Indonesia/Malaysia/Philippines/Thailand)
- Autumn Days - Tsai Ming-liang (Taiwan)
- Dadyaa - Bibhusan BASNET, Pooja GURUNG (Nepal/France)
- Following - Leesong Hee-il (Korea)
- Gerontophobia - Boris SVERLOW (Belgium/Netherlands)
- Imago - Raymund GUTIERREZ (Philippines)
- Madly - Sion Sono, Gael García Bernal, Anurag Kashyap, Natasha Khan, Sebastián Silva, Mia Wasikowska (United States/Argentina/Australia/India/Japan/United Kingdom)
- On the Origin of Fear - Bayu Prihantoro FILEMON (Indonesia)
- Single Belief - Lee Kang-sheng (Taiwan)
- Special Screening of Pixar Short Animations - Alvy Ray Smith and 14 others (United States)
- The Cameraman - Connor Gaston (Canada)
- Wind - SAW Tiong Guan (Malaysia)

==== Documentary Competition ====
- A Whale of a Tale - SASAKI Megumi (Japan/United States)
- Absent Without Leave - LAU Kek-Huat, CHEN Jing-Lian (Taiwan/Malaysia)
- Burmese on the Roof - OH Hyunjin, KO Duhyun (Korea)
- Farming Boys - BYUN Siyeon, JANG Sejung, KANG Hojun (Korea)
- Neighborhood - SUNG Seungtaek (Korea)
- Railways Sleepers - Sompot CHIDGASORNPONGSE (Thailand)
- SUN - WON Hoyeon (Korea)
- Sunday Beauty Queen - Baby Ruth VILLARAMA (Philippines/Hong Kong, China/Japan/United Kingdom)
- The Crescent Rising - Sheron DAYOC (Philippines)
- Those from the Shore - Tamara Stepanyan (Lebanon/Qatar/Armenia/France)
- Time to Read Poems - LEE Soojung (Korea)

==== Documentary Showcase ====
- A Journey Through French Cinema - Bertrand Tavernier (France)
- An Insignificant Man - Khushboo RANKA, Vinay Shukla (India)
- Becoming Who I Was - MOON Changyong, JEON Jin (Korea)
- Doomed Beauty - Helena Třeštíková, Jakub HEJNA (Czech Republic)
- Fake - Tatsuya Mori (Japan)
- Gentleman Rissient - Benoît Jacquot, Pascal Mérigeau, Guy Seligman (France)
- In Exile - Tin Win NAING (Germany/Myanmar)
- J: Beyond Flamenco - Carlos Saura (Spain)
- Safari - Ulrich Seidl (Austria/Denmark)
- Ta'ang - Wang Bing (Hong Kong, China/France)
- Tempestad - Tatiana HUEZO (Mexico)
- The Apology - Tiffany Hsiung (Canada)
- The Cinema Travellers - Shirley ABRAHAM, Amit Madheshiya (India)
- The Marvelous Spiral - Massimo D’ANOLFI, Martina PARENTI (Italy/Switzerland)
- The Remnants - LEE Hyuk-sang, KIM Il-rhan (Korea)
- The Revolution Won't Be Televised - Rama Thiaw (Senegal/France)
- Weekends - LEE Dongha (Korea)

==== Cinekids ====
- Friends Forever - A Pig's Tale - Theresa STROZYK, Tony LOESER (Germany)
- Get Santa - Jacob LEY (Denmark)
- McDull: Rise of the Rice Cooker - Brian Tse (Hong Kong, China)
- Mercy Street - Stefan BUZEA (Romania)
- The Mobarak - Mohammad Reza EMAMI (Iran)

==== Animation Showcase ====
- Iqbal: the Tale of a Fearless Child - Michel FUZELLIER, Babak Payami (Italy/France)
- Louise by the Shore - Jean-François Laguionie (France/Canada)
- Window Horses - Ann Marie Fleming (Canada)

=== Open Cinema ===
- At Cafe 6 - Neal WU (Taiwan/China)
- At War with Love - Pierfrancesco Diliberto (Italy)
- Between Sea and Land - Manolo CRUZ, Carlos DEL CASTILLO (Colombia)
- Shin Godzilla - Shinji Higuchi, Hideaki Anno (Japan)
- Heart of Stone - Johannes NABER (Germany)
- Mirzya - Rakeysh Omprakash Mehra (India)
- Sultan - Ali Abbas Zafar (India/Hungary)
- The Birth of a Nation - Nate Parker (United States)

=== Special Programs in Focus ===
==== And Film Goes On: Abbas Kiarostami Retrospective ====
- 24 Frames - Abbas Kiarostami (Iran)
- 76 Minutes and 15 Seconds with Abbas Kiarostami - Seifollah SAMADIAN (Iran)
- And Life Goes on - Abbas Kiarostami (Iran)
- Certified Copy - Abbas Kiarostami (France/Iran/Italy/Belgium)
- Close-Up - Abbas Kiarostami (Iran)
- Roads of Kiarostami - Abbas Kiarostami (Iran)
- Taste of Cherry - Abbas Kiarostami (Iran/France)
- The Wind Will Carry Us - Abbas Kiarostami (Iran/France)
- Through the Olive Trees - Abbas Kiarostami (Iran/France)
- Where Is the Friend's Home? - Abbas Kiarostami (Iran)

==== Cali Group: Root of Colombian Cinema ====
- Araucaima Mansion - Carlos MAYOLO (Colombia)
- Asuncion - Carlos MAYOLO, Luis OSPINA (Colombia)
- Blood and Rain - Jorge NAVAS (Colombia/Argentina)
- Crab Trap - Oscar RUIZ NAVIA (Colombia/France)
- Flesh of Your Flesh - Carlos MAYOLO (Colombia)
- Hammock - Carlos MAYOLO (Colombia)
- It All Started at the End - Luis OSPINA (Colombia)
- Listen Look - Luis OSPINA, Carlos MAYOLO (Colombia)
- Liveforever - Carlos MORENO (Colombia/Mexico)
- Pollution is... - Carlos MAYOLO (Colombia)
- Pure Blood - Luis OSPINA (Colombia)
- That 19th - Carlos MAYOLO (Colombia)
- The Towrope - William VEGA (Colombia/France/Mexico)
- The Vampires of Poverty - Luis OSPINA, Carlos MAYOLO (Colombia)

=== Midnight Passion ===
- Aroused by Gymnopedies - Isao Yukisada (Japan)
- Blair Witch - Adam Wingard (United States)
- Headshot - Timo TJAHJANTO, Kimo STAMBOEL (Indonesia)
- Museum - OTOMO Keishi (Japan)
- The Girl with All the Gifts - Colm McCarthy (United Kingdom)
- The Wailing - Na Hong-jin (Korea/United States)
- Transpecos - Greg KWEDAR (United States)
- Wet Woman in the Wind - Akihiko Shiota (Japan)
- White Lily - Hideo Nakata (Japan)

=== Closing ===
- Reseba: The Dark Wind - Hussein Hassan (Iraq/Germany/Qatar)

== Awards ==
- New Currents Award
  - The Donor - ZANG Qiwu (China)
  - Knife in the Clear Water - WANG Xuebo (China)
- BIFF Mecenat Award
  - Neighborhood - SUNG Seungtaek (Korea)
  - The Crescent Rising - Sheron DAYOC (Philippines)
- Sonje Award
  - Viewer - KIM Soyoun (Korea)
  - Off-season - Yelzat ESKENDIR (Kazakhstan)
- Actor & Actress of the Year Award
  - Koo Kyo-hwan - Jane (Korea)
  - Lee Min-ji - Jane (Korea)
- FIPRESCI Award
  - White Ant - CHU Hsien-Che (Taiwan)
- NETPAC Award
  - Merry Christmas Mr. Mo - Lim Dae-hyung (Korea)
- Daemyung Culture Wave Award
  - Yongsoon - SHIN Joon - (Korea)
- KNN Award
  - In Between Seasons - Lee Dong-eun (Korea)
- Busan Bank Award
  - Night of a 1000 Hours - Virgil Widrich (Luxembourg/Austria/Netherlands)
- Citizen Critics' Award
  - Jamsil - LEE Wanmin (Korea)
- Busan Cinephile Award
  - The Apology - Tiffany HSIUNG (Canada)
- CGV Arthouse Award
  - Jane - CHO Hyunhoon (Korea)
- Vision-Director's Award
  - JANG Woo-jin - Autumn, Autumn (Korea)
  - AHN Seon-kyoung - Hyeon's Quartet (Korea)
- The Asian Filmmaker of the Year
  - Abbas Kiarostami (Iran)
- Korean Cinema Award
  - Laurence Herszberg (France)
