= Jane (2016 film) =

- Film poster
- Hangul: 꿈의 제인
- RR: Kkumui jein
- MR: Kkumŭi chein
- Directed by: Cho Hyun-hoon
- Written by: Cho Hyun-hoon; Kim So-mi
- Produced by: Baek Jae-ho
- Starring: Lee Min-ji; Koo Kyo-hwan
- Cinematography: Cho Young-jik
- Edited by: Choi Hyun-sook
- Music by: Flash Flood Darlings
- Production company: House in Seoul
- Distributed by: Atnine Film; CGV Arthouse
- Release dates: October 2016 (BIFF); May 31, 2017 (South Korea)
- Running time: 104 minutes
- Country: South Korea
- Language: Korean
- Box office: US$161,991

Jane (Korean: 꿈의 제인) is a 2016 South Korean drama film directed by Cho Hyun-hoon. This is Cho's first feature-length film. The film was premiered at the 21st Busan International Film Festival.

== Plot ==
So-hyun is a runaway who is left alone after her boyfriend Jung-ho disappears. By accident, she gets to know a transgender woman named Jane. She joins Jane and her group of misfit runaways, who are as comforting and loving as a real family.

== Cast ==
- Lee Min-ji as So-hyun
- Koo Kyo-hwan as Jane
- Lee Joo-young as Ji-su
- Park Kang-seop as Dae-po
- Kim Young-woo as Jong-gu
- Park Kyung-hye as Na-gyeong

== Reception ==
=== Box office ===
The movie was released in South Korean theatres on May 31st, 2017. It grossed $34,707 on its opening week and $161,991 overall.

=== Critical response ===
Elizabeth Kerr of The Hollywood Reporter gave a mixed review, commenting "A compelling turn by Gu Gyohwan as the title character should stoke interest among LGBT festivals, but after that, Jane is destined for oblivion."

=== Awards and nominations ===
Year	Award	Category	Recipient	Result
2016	21st Busan International Film Festival	Actor of the Year	Koo Kyo-hwan	Won
2016	21st Busan International Film Festival	Actress of the Year	Lee Min-ji	Won
2016	21st Busan International Film Festival	CGV Arthouse Award	Jane	Won
2017	26th Buil Film Awards	Best New Director	Cho Hyun-hoon	Nominated
2017	26th Buil Film Awards	Best New Actor	Koo Kyo-hwan	Won
2017	26th Buil Film Awards	Best New Actress	Lee Min-ji	Nominated
2017	26th Buil Film Awards	Best New Actress	Lee Joo-young	Nominated
2017	26th Buil Film Awards	Best Screenplay	Cho Hyun-hoon; Kim So-mi	Nominated
2017	26th Buil Film Awards	Best Music	Flash Flood Darlings	Won
2017	37th Korean Association of Film Critics Awards	Best Independent Film	Jane	Won
2017	18th Busan Film Critics Awards	Best New Actor	Koo Kyo-hwan	Won
2017	38th Blue Dragon Film Awards	Best New Director	Cho Hyun-hoon	Nominated
2017	38th Blue Dragon Film Awards	Best New Actor	Koo Kyo-hwan	Nominated
2017	38th Blue Dragon Film Awards	Best New Actress	Lee Min-ji	Nominated
2017	38th Blue Dragon Film Awards	Best Screenplay	Cho Hyun-hoon; Kim So-mi	Nominated
2017	17th Director's Cut Awards	Best New Director	Cho Hyun-hoon	Won
2018	9th Korea Film Reporters Association Film Awards (KOFRA)	Best Independent Film	Jane	Won
2018	54th Baeksang Arts Awards	Best New Actor	Koo Kyo-hwan	Won
2018	54th Baeksang Arts Awards	Best New Actress	Lee Joo-young	Nominated
2018	54th Baeksang Arts Awards	Best New Director	Cho Hyun-hoon	Nominated
2018	23rd Chunsa Film Art Awards	Best New Director	Cho Hyun-hoon	Nominated
2018	23rd Chunsa Film Art Awards	Best Actress	Lee Min-ji	Nominated
2018	23rd Chunsa Film Art Awards	Best Supporting Actor	Koo Kyo-hwan	Nominated
2018	23rd Chunsa Film Art Awards	Best New Actress	Lee Joo-young	Nominated
