= Guo Jianmei =

Chinese lawyer and human rights activist

- 郭建梅
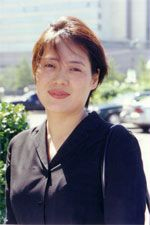
- Pronunciation: Guō Jiànméi
- Born: March 1960 (age 65–66)
- Occupation: Lawyer
- Spouse: Liu Zhenyun
- Children: Liu Yulin

Guo Jianmei (Chinese: 郭建梅; pinyin: Guō Jiànméi; born March 27, 1960) is a Chinese lawyer, human rights activist and director of a women's legal aid NGO. In 2005, she was one of 1000 women put forward as nominees for the Nobel Peace Prize. Guo is the recipient of the 2010 Simone De Beauvoir Prize and the International Women of Courage Award in 2011. She received the Right Livelihood Award in 2019. She is married to writer Liu Zhenyun.

== Career ==
Guo was born into a family of peasants in the impoverished region of Hua County, Henan Province. Seeing the poverty, underdevelopment and violation of women's rights in both the previous generations of her own family as well as the village where she lived was the stimulus for her lifelong dedication to improving the rights of women in China.

When she was 18 Guo attended Law School at Peking University, graduating in 1983. She subsequently worked at the Ministry of Justice, The All China Federation of Women and The All China Association of Lawyers. She is currently Executive Director of the Women's Legal Research and Service Centre of the Law School of Beijing University.

In 1995, Guo attended the Fourth International Forum for Women Lawyers and the United Nations international World Conference on Women in Beijing.

Later that same year, she and others founded the Beijing University Law School Women's Legal Research and Services Centre, the first non-profit-making non-governmental organization specializing in women's legal aid in China. The Centre grew to become an influential force in safeguarding the rights and interests of women. In 2010, Beijing University officially disassociated itself from the centre, meaning The Women's Legal Research and Service Centre was no longer affiliated with the university. In 2016 the centre was ordered by the Chinese government to shut down.

Guo participated in a revision of China's Marriage Law in 2001 and the enactment of the Regulations for Legal Aid in 2003. She has published 8 books, and is editor of three volumes of the popular law readers' "Everyday Life Law", and "A Guide to Women's Legal Aid Cases".

== Achievements ==
In 2010 Guo Jianmei was awarded the Simone De Beauvoir Prize, and was announced as China's first anti-AIDS discrimination ambassador by ILO, the International Labor Organisation. In 2011 she was awarded the International Women of Courage Award by the United States Department of State.

In 2019 she received the Right Livelihood Award for her pioneering and persistent work in securing women’s rights in China.
