= Before the Vigil =

- Film poster

Japanese name
- Kanji: つやのよる ある愛に関わった、女たちの物語
Transcriptions
- Revised Hepburn: Tsuya no Yoru Aru Ai ni Kakawatta
- Directed by: Isao Yukisada
- Screenplay by: Chihiro Itō; Isao Yukisada
- Based on: Tsuya no Yoru by Areno Inoue
- Produced by: Tatsuhiko Taniguchi; Shin Torisawa; Kazuhito Amano
- Cinematography: Jun Fukumoto
- Edited by: Tsuyoshi Imai
- Production companies: Happinet; Toei Video Company; Gambit; Dwango; Second Sight; King Records
- Distributed by: Toei Company
- Release date: January 15, 2013 (Japan)
- Running time: 138 minutes
- Country: Japan
- Language: Japanese

Before the Vigil (Japanese: つやのよる ある愛に関わった、女たちの物語, Hepburn: Tsuya no Yoru: Aru Ai ni Kakawatta, Onna Tachi no Monogatari) is a 2013 Japanese drama film directed by Isao Yukisada. It is based on the novel Tsuya no Yoru by Areno Inoue.

== Plot ==
Mastuyo and Tsuya have an unusual relationship, in that Tsuya's out of the ordinary behaviour includes the fact she has various lovers. Matsuya still loves here, and after moving to Oyima, he discovers that she has cancer. Matsuya takes it upon himself to contact her lovers and let them know of her fate.

== Cast ==
- Hiroshi Abe as Matsuoi
- Kyoko Koizumi as Tamaki Ishida
- Maho Nonami as Minato Hashimoto
- Jun Fubuki as Sakiko Hashikawa
- Yōko Maki as Momoko Ikeda
- Shioli Kutsuna as Machiko Yamada
- Shinobu Otake as Sachiko Yamada
