= Someone to Talk To =

2016 Chinese-Hong Kong film by Liu Yulin

- Traditional Chinese: 一句頂一萬句
- Simplified Chinese: 一句顶一万句
- Hanyu Pinyin: Yī Jù Dǐng Yīwàn Jù
- Directed by: Liu Yulin
- Screenplay by: Liu Zhenyun
- Based on: One Sentence Is Ten Thousand Sentences by Liu Zhenyun
- Produced by: William Kong
- Starring: Mao Hai; Li Qian; Liu Bei; Fan Wei
- Cinematography: Wu Di
- Edited by: Zhong Yijuan
- Music by: Gong Tianpeng; Li Jian
- Production companies: Beijing Tugu Culture Communication; Beijing Weiying Shidai Technology Co.; Beijing Yuanshan Culture & Communication; Old Western Village Pictures
- Release dates: September 19, 2016 (XI’AN Silk Road International Film Festival); November 4, 2016 (China)
- Running time: 107 minutes
- Countries: China; Hong Kong
- Language: Mandarin
- Box office: $2,812,850

Someone to Talk To is a 2016 drama film directed by Liu Yulin, a student at the Tisch School of the Arts and a silver medalist at the 41st Student Academy Awards, in her feature film directorial debut.

Liu Zhenyun, Liu Yulin's father, wrote the screenplay based on his award-winning novel, One Sentence Is Ten Thousand Sentences.

== Plot ==
Cobbler Niu Aiguo is in conflict with his wife, while his older sister, street food vendor Niu Aixiang, considers marriage later in life. Both desperately want to communicate with someone, despite their vastly different situations. Aiguo eventually breaks up with his wife and Aixiang marries divorcée Song Jiefang. While searching for his wife, Aiguo runs into his childhood friend Chuhong and strikes up a conversation with her. It turns out that she is also divorced due to communication failure. Meanwhile, it seems Aixiang and Jiefang struggle to get along.

== Cast ==
- Mao Hai as Niu Aiguo
- Li Qian as Pang Lina
- Liu Bei as Niu Aixiang
- Fan Wei as Song Jiefang
- Yu Entai as Jiang
- Qi Xi as Xinting
- Sun Qian as Chuhong
- Li Nuonuo as Baihui

== Release ==
The movie had its world premiere at the New Currents section at the 21st Busan International Film Festival in October 2016. It was subsequently released in theaters in Mainland China, the United Kingdom, New Zealand, and the United States in November 2016. It has also been selected for more than 50 film festivals around the world, including, but not limited to, the New York Asian Film Festival, Cairo International Film Festival, Hong Kong Asian Film Festival, and XI’AN Silk Road International Film Festival.

== Reception ==
Elizabeth Kerr of The Hollywood Reporter wrote that despite "a few missteps, Liu’s first effort is an assured examination of the world right now, and proves she’s one to watch."

== Accolades ==
Award	Date of ceremony	Category	Recipient(s) and nominee(s)	Result	Ref(s)
China Film Director's Guild Awards	April 23, 2017	Best Actor	Fan Wei	Nominated	
China Film Director's Guild Awards	April 23, 2017	Best Young Director	Liu Yulin	Nominated	
Golden Horse Awards	November 26, 2016	Best Supporting Actress	Liu Bei	Nominated	
Busan International Film Festival	October 15, 2016	New Currents Award	Liu Yulin	Nominated	
Beijing College Student Film Festival	May 7, 2017	Best Directorial Debut	Liu Yulin	Nominated	
