= Woo Ji-hyun =

South Korean actor

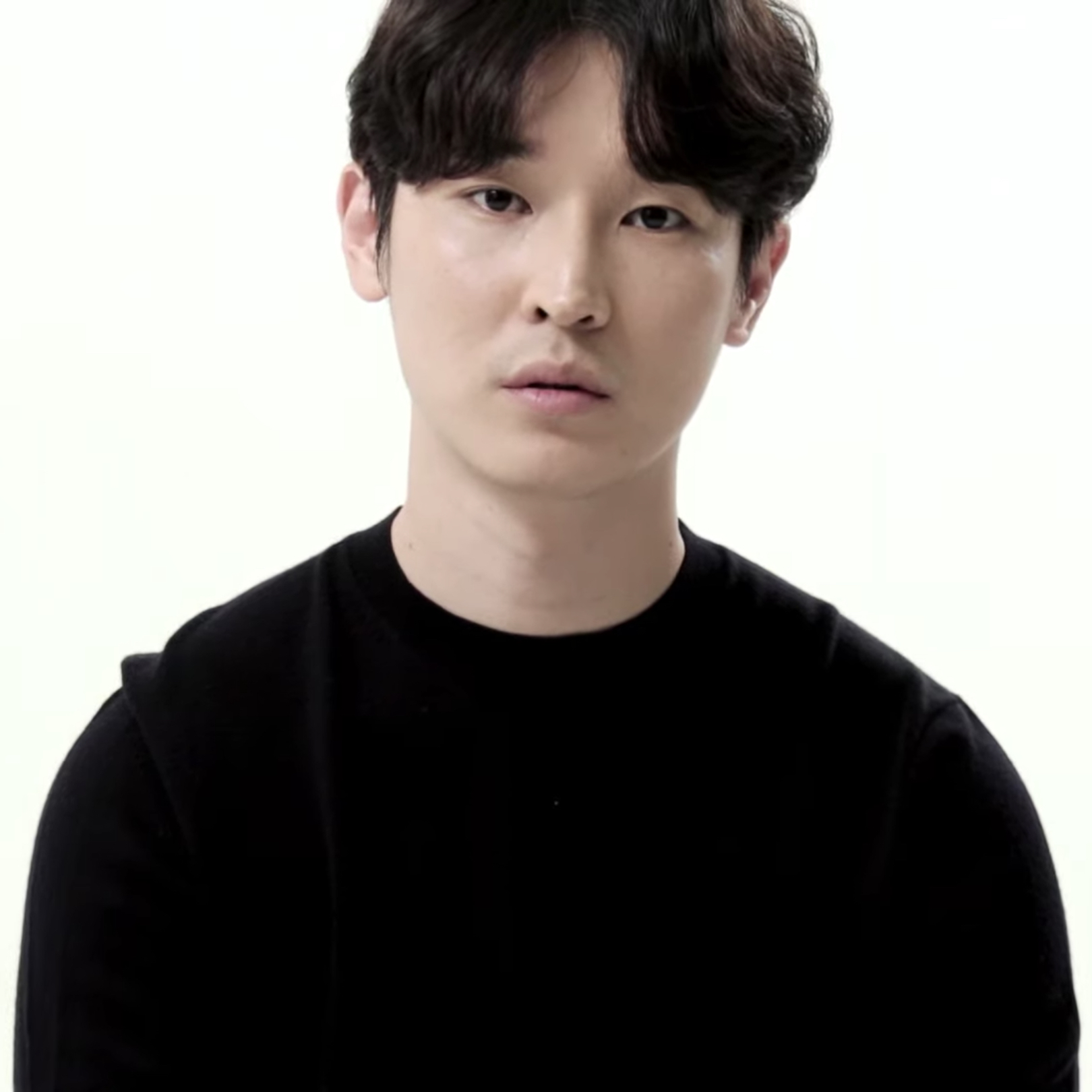
- Woo for Marie Claire Korea in 2020
- Born: June 3, 1986 (age 40); Busan, South Korea
- Other name: Woo Ji-hyeon
- Education: Hanyang University (Bachelor of Theater and Film)
- Occupation: Actor
- Years active: 2014–present
- Agent: Noon Company
- Known for: Mouse; The Veil; All of Us Are Dead

Woo Ji-hyun (Korean: 우지현; born June 3, 1986) is a South Korean actor. He is known for his roles in dramas such as The Veil, Mouse, A Piece of Your Mind and All of Us Are Dead. He also appeared in movies In Between Seasons, The Witness, I Can Speak and Kim Ji-young: Born 1982.

== Filmography ==
=== Film ===
Year	Title		Role	Ref.
Year	English	Korean	Role	Ref.
2014	A Fresh Start	새출발	Ji-hyeon	
2017	I Can Speak	아이 캔 스피크	Public service employee	
2017	Black Summer	검은 여름	Ji-hyeon	
2017	Room No.7	7호실	Cafe manager	
2018	In Between Seasons	환절기	Han-sung	
2018	Mothers	당신의 부탁	Police officer	
2018	Park Hwa Young	박화영	Sang-sik's group	
2018	The Witness	목격자	Newspaper delivery guy	
2018	Autumn, Autumn	춘천, 춘천	Ji-hyun	
2019	Inseparable Bros	나의 특급 형제	Ahn Nyung-yi	
2019	The King's Letters	나랏말싸미	Confucianism scholar	
2019	Kim Ji-young: Born 1982	82년생 김지영	Byung-shik	
2020	Dust-Man	더스트 맨	Tae-san	
2020	Somewhere in Between	국도극장	National Theater photo man	
2020	Somewhere in Between - Director's Cut	국도극장: 감독판	National Theater photo man	
2020	Sparrow	제비	Lee Ho-yeon	
2021	Ghost Image	유령 이미지	Jung-hoo	
2022	Highway Family	고속도로 가족		
2022	Everyone's Lover	만인의 연인		
2022	Transit	트랜짓	Min-ho	
2022	Decibel	데시벨	Kim Yoo-taek	
2023	Swallow	제비	Ho-yeon	
2023	Her Hobby	그녀의 취미생활	Kwang Jae	

=== Television series ===
Year	Title	Role	Notes	Ref.
2016	KBS Drama Special – A Dance From Afar	Kim Jung-bin	one act-drama	
2018–2019	Sky Castle	Jeon Jin-man		
2019	Search: WWW	Choi Bong-ki		
2020	A Piece of Your Mind	Bae Jin-hwan		
2020	The King: Eternal Monarch	Rookie		
2021	The Veil	Wie Goo-pyung		
2021	Mouse	Gu Dong-gu		
2022	The Empire	Wang Jung-jin		
2023	The Kidnapping Day	Choi Taek-gyun		
2023	Dr. Romantic Season 3	Jeon Kyung-soo		
2024	The Auditors	Im Jeong-yun		
2025	Trigger	Yoo Jung-tae		
2025	The Murky Stream	Bang		

=== Web series ===
Year	Title	Role	Ref.
2022	All of Us Are Dead	Kim Woo-shin	
2022	Anna	Seon-woo	
2023	The Deal	Cha Jae-kyung	
2023	Gyeongseong Creature	Ryu Sachimoto	

=== Music video appearances ===
Year	Title	Artist	Length	Ref.
2018	"Between Us"	Lee Moon-sae	3:25	

=== Hosting ===
Year	Title	Notes	Ref.
2020–present	Jeongdongjin Independent Film Festival	with Lee Sang-hee	

== Awards and nominations ==
Name of the award ceremony, year presented, category, nominee of the award, and the result of the nomination
Award ceremony	Year	Category	Result	Ref.
Shanghai International Film Festival	2015	Asian New Talent Award	Nominated	
