= Mothers (2017 South Korean film) =

2017 film by Lee Dong-eun

- Promotional poster
- Hangul: 당신의 부탁
- Lit.: Your Request
- RR: Dangsinui butak
- MR: Tangsinŭi put'ak
- Directed by: Lee Dong-eun
- Screenplay by: Lee Dong-eun
- Based on: Your Request - My Other Mother by Lee Dong-eun
- Produced by: Kim Ji-young
- Starring: Im Soo-jung; Yoon Chan-young
- Cinematography: Sung Seung-taek
- Edited by: Choi Hyun-sook
- Music by: Park In-young
- Production company: Myung Films
- Release dates: October 13, 2017 (BIFF); April 19, 2018 (South Korea)
- Running time: 119 minutes
- Country: South Korea
- Language: Korean
- Box office: US$189,141

Mothers (Korean: 당신의 부탁) is a 2017 South Korean drama film directed by Lee Dong-eun, based on his 2015 novel Your Request - My Other Mother. The film stars Im Soo-jung and Yoon Chan-young.

== Plot ==
A woman who lost her husband to an accident has to cope with raising her sixteen-year-old stepson from her husband's previous marriage.

== Cast ==
- Im Soo-jung as Hyo-jin
- Yoon Chan-young as Jong-wook
- Lee Sang-hee as Mi-ran
- Oh Mi-yeon as Myeong-ja
- Seo Shin-ae as Joo-mi
- Han Joo-wan as Jeong-woo
- Kim Sun-young as Yeon-hwa
- Seo Jeong-yeon as Seo-yeong
- Kim Min-jae as Kyung-taek
- Jang Hye-jin as Jeong-hee
- Woo Ji-hyun as Police officer
- Kim Ja-young as Mom
- Kim Tae-woo as Kyung-soo (special appearance)

== Production ==
Principal photography began on June 20, 2017. Filming wrapped on July 27, 2017, in Cheongju.

== Release ==
Mothers had its world premiere at the 22nd Busan International Film Festival and was released on April 19, 2018, in local cinemas.

== Awards and nominations ==
Award	Category	Recipient	Result	Ref.
Vesoul International Film Festival of Asian Cinema	NETPAC Award	Mothers	Won	
