= Cock and Bull (film) =

- Poster
- Chinese: 追凶者也
- Directed by: Cao Baoping
- Written by: Yang Jianjun; Zhang Tianhui
- Produced by: Cao Baoping; Fu Yunyun; Liu Bo; Wu Huijun
- Starring: Liu Ye; Zhang Yi; Duan Bowen; Wang Ziwen; Tan Zhuo; Wang Yanhui; Yan Bei; Sun Lei
- Cinematography: Yang Shu
- Edited by: Li Yongyi
- Music by: Ou Ge; Wang Tongyu
- Production companies: Hehe (Shanghai) Pictures; Dream Sky Entertainment; Shanghai Qianyi Zhicheng Culture & Media; Xingguang Maite Media Group; Shanghai Film Group; Wanda Media; Beijing Biaozhun Yingxiang Media
- Distributed by: Huaxia Film Distribution; Sihai Distribution Association; Lianrui (Shanghai) Pictures; Hehe (Shanghai) Pictures; Beijing Zhonglian Huameng Media Investment; Shanghai Tao Piao Piao Entertainment; Tianjin Huyu Times Technology
- Release dates: 17 June 2016 (Shanghai); 14 September 2016
- Running time: 113 minutes
- Country: China
- Language: Mandarin
- Box office: CN¥135.89 million

Cock and Bull (Chinese: 追凶者也) is a 2016 Chinese crime comedy drama film directed by Cao Baoping and starring Liu Ye, Zhang Yi, Duan Bowen, Wang Ziwen, Tan Zhuo, Wang Yanhui, Yan Bei and Sun Lei. It was released in China on 14 September 2016.

== Synopsis ==
Three interlocking stories revolve around a murder in a small town in Southeast China. A local mechanic, known for his honesty, comes under suspicion from the police. A young, unemployed man has been seen with the victim's scooter. And the boyfriend of a bar hostess has been hanging around the town.

== Cast ==
- Liu Ye
- Zhang Yi
- Duan Bowen
- Wang Ziwen
- Tan Zhuo
- Wang Yanhui
- Yan Bei
- Sun Lei

== Reception ==
The film has grossed CN¥135.89 million at the Chinese box office.

== Awards and nominations ==
Award ceremony	Category	Recipient(s)	Result	Ref.
19th Shanghai International Film Festival	Best Film	Cock and Bull	Nominated	
19th Shanghai International Film Festival	Best Actor	Liu Ye	Won	
8th International Chinese Film Festival	Best Director	Cao Baoping	Won	
8th China Film Director's Guild Awards	Best Actor	Zhang Yi	Won	
31st Golden Rooster Awards	Best Supporting Actor	Zhang Yi	Nominated	
12th Chinese Young Generation Film Forum Awards	Best New Sound Mixer	Dukar Tserang	Won	
17th Chinese Film Media Awards	Best Supporting Actor	Zhang Yi	Nominated	
24th Beijing College Student Film Festival	Best Director	Cao Baoping	Nominated	
24th Beijing College Student Film Festival	Best Screenplay	Cao Baoping, Zhang Tianhui, Yang Jianjun	Nominated	
24th Beijing College Student Film Festival	Best Actor	Zhang Yi	Won	
