= Liu Yulin =

Chinese film director

- Born: 1987 (age 38–39); Beijing
- Education: NYU Tisch (M.F.A.); Communication University of China (B.A.) in Television & Journalism
- Occupation: Film Director
- Years active: 2013–present
- Notable work: Someone to Talk To
- Parents: Liu Zhenyun (father); Guo Jianmei (mother)
- Awards: Student Academy Awards

Liu Yulin is a Chinese film director, a graduate with the Master of Fine Arts degree from the Graduate Film program of the Tisch School of the Arts at New York University. In 2014, her short narrative film Door God, which is about a girl in China awaiting the return of her mother, won her the first international film prize - silver medal under the narrative category at the 41st Student Academy Awards. The same film later won in the category of Best Woman Student Filmmaker at the 20th Annual Directors Guild of America Student Film Awards - East Region. With her NYU thesis film Someone to Talk To, which is adapted from her father Liu Zhenyun's award-winning novel One Sentence Is Ten Thousand Sentences, she made her feature film debut in October 2016 at the New Currents section at the 21st Busan International Film Festival.

== Filmography ==
Year	Title	Role
2013	Door God	Director
2016	Someone to Talk To	Director
2018	Half the Sky	Director
2022	In Our Prime	Director
2023	Just for Meeting You	Director

== Accolades ==
Award	Date of ceremony	Category	Result	Ref(s)
China Film Director's Guild Awards	April 23, 2017	Best Young Director	Nominated	
Busan International Film Festival	October 15, 2016	New Currents Award	Nominated	
Directors Guild of America Student Film Awards - East Region	December 11, 2014	Best Woman Student Filmmaker	Won	
Student Academy Awards	June 6, 2014	Narrative - Silver Medal	Won	
Beijing College Student Film Festival	May 7, 2017	Best Directorial Debut	Nominated	
