= Reseba: The Dark Wind =

- Film poster
- Directed by: Hussein Hassan
- Written by: Mehmet Aktaş; Hussein Hassan
- Produced by: Mehmet Aktaş
- Starring: Rekesh Shabaz; Diman Zandi
- Cinematography: Touraj Aslani
- Edited by: Ebrahim Saeedi
- Music by: Mustafa Biber
- Production company: mîtosfilm
- Release date: September 9, 2016 (Duhok International Film Festival)
- Running time: 92 minutes
- Countries: Kurdistan; Germany
- Languages: Kurdish; Arabic

Reseba: The Dark Wind (Kurdish: Reṣeba) is a 2016 Iraqi film directed and co-written by Kurdish director Hussein Hassan. It made its world premiere as the opening film of the 4th Duhok International Film Festival in September 2016 and its international premiere as the closing film of the 21st Busan International Film Festival on October 15, 2016.

During its screening at the Duhok International Film Festival, the film was received angrily by some in the audience as it struck close to still open wounds. Crowds flooded out before the end of the film, upset, believing the female lead Pero (who was captured and sold by the Islamic State and then raped) was killed in the film.

On December 14, 2016, the Dubai Film Festival gave the Best Fiction Feature award to Hussein Hassan for this movie. Diman Zandi also received the Special Jury Award as Best Actress at the Los Angeles Asian Pacific Film Festival for her performance.

It was selected as the Iraqi entry for the Best Foreign Language Film at the 90th Academy Awards, but it was not nominated.

It held its North American Premiere at Miami Film Festival 2017.

== Plot ==
A young Yazidi couple struggle during the Islamic State's seizure of Sinjar and the massacre that follows.

== Cast ==
- Rekesh Shabaz as Reko
- Diman Zandi as Pero
- Maryam Boobani
- Adil Abdulrahman

== See also ==
- List of submissions to the 90th Academy Awards for Best Foreign Language Film
- List of Iraqi submissions for the Academy Award for Best Foreign Language Film
