= Seoul Institute of the Arts =

University in Seoul, South Korea

Coordinates: 37.3343°N 126.8360°E

- 서울예술대학교
- Motto: 창의, 성실, 협동
- Motto in English: "Creativity, Sincerity, Cooperation"
- Type: Private
- Established: September 1962
- Founder: Yoo Chi-Jin
- President: Yoo Tay Guhn
- Total staff: 449 (2022)
- Students: 4,169 (2022)
- Location: Ansan, Gyeonggi Province, South Korea
- Campus: Urban
- Website: www.seoularts.ac.kr

- Seoul Institute of the Arts
- Hangul: 서울예술대학교
- Hanja: 서울藝術大學校
- RR: Seoul yesul daehakgyo
- MR: Sŏul yesul taehakkyo

Seoul Institute of the Arts (Korean: 서울예술대학교) is an arts university in Ansan, Gyeonggi Province, South Korea. The Namsan campus in Seoul is used for presentation of arts productions and convergence with industry. The Ansan Campus opened in 2001 and is used for educational training.

== History ==
- August 1958 – Korean Theatre Research Institute was founded.
- April 1962 – Drama Center and Theatre Library were opened.
- June 1962 – Korean Theatre Academy was founded (closed March 1964).
- March 1964 – Seoul Drama School was founded (closed December 1973)
- December 1973 – Seoul Art Academy was founded.
- December 1978 – Seoul Art Academy was renamed to Seoul Art College.
- February 1982 – Korean Theatre Research Institute was renamed to Korea Research Center for Arts.
- February 1998 – Korea Research Center for Arts was renamed to Dongnang Art Center.
- June 1998 – Seoul Art College was renamed to Seoul Institute of the Arts.
- March 2001 – Namsan Education Center was opened.
- September 2002 – Dongnang Acting Class for the Youth was opened.

=== Former presidents ===
- Prof. Yoo Duk-hyung (December 1978 – March 1994)
- Prof. Yang Jung-hyun (March 1994 – March 1998)
- Prof. Kim Ki-duk (March 1998 – March 2001)
- Ahn Min-soo (March 2001 – February 2004)
- Ro Kun-il (March 2004 – February 2007)
- Prof. Yoo Duk-hyung (March 2007 – July 2019)
- Lee Nam-shik (August 2019 - July 2022)
- Prof. Yoo Tay Guhn (August 2022)

== Departments ==
Department	Established
Applied Music	November 1987
Broadcasting	December 1978
Creative Advertising	November 1988
Creative Writing	December 1978
Dance	December 1978
Digital Arts	March 2003
Film	December 1978
Interior Design	November 1987
Korean Music	December 1980
Photography	December 1980
Dramatic Writing	November 1987
Theatre	December 1978
Visual Arts	March 1989
Visual Design	November 1987
Acting	March 2007
School of Arts and Humanities
School of Media Arts (Bachelor's degree)
School of Performing Arts (Bachelor's degree)
School of Experimental Media and Performing Arts (Master's degree)

== Notable alumni ==
=== Actors and actresses ===
- Ahn Jae-wook
- Bang Eun-hee
- Cha Tae-hyun
- Choi Ja-hye
- Choi Jong-hwan
- Choi Jong-won
- Choi Min-soo
- Choi Myung-gil
- Dokgo Young-jae
- Ga Deuk-hee
- Go Bo-gyeol
- Han Hye-jin
- Han Joo-wan
- Han Jung-soo
- Han Sang-jin
- Hong Ah-reum
- Hong Eun-hee
- Huh Joon-ho
- Hwang Jung-min
- Hyun Jyu-ni
- Im Hyung-joon
- Im Ji-eun
- Im Won-hee
- Jang Hyuk
- Jang Hyun-sung
- Jang Jin
- Jang Yong
- Jang Young-nam
- Jeon Do-yeon
- Jeon Mi-seon
- Jeon Moo-song
- Jin Tae-hyun
- Jo Jae-yoon
- Jo Jung-suk
- Jo Mi-ryung
- Jo Sung-ha
- Jung Dong-hwan
- Jung Eun-pyo
- Jung Hye-young
- Jung Il-woo
- Jung Jae-young
- Jung Woo
- Jung Woong-in
- Jung Yu-mi
- Kang Eun-tak
- Kang Hye-jung
- Kang Sung-yeon
- Kil Yong-woo
- Kim Bo-kyung
- Kim Bum
- Kim Eung-soo
- Kim Ha-neul
- Kim Hee-won
- Kim Ho-jin
- Kim Hye-ok
- Kim Jae-wook
- Kim Joo-hun
- Kim Ji-han
- Kim Kyu-chul
- Kim Min-jong
- Kim Min-kyo
- Kim Myung-min
- Kim Na-woon
- Kim San-ho
- Kim Seon-ho
- Kim Seul-gi
- Kim Su-ro
- Kim Won-hae
- Kim Won-jun
- Kim Yoo-mi
- Kim Young-hoon
- Ko Chang-seok
- Koo Hye-sun
- Koo Kyo-hwan
- Kwon Hyuk-soo
- Lee Cho-hee
- Lee Chun-hee
- Lee Dong-gun
- Lee Dong-hwi
- Lee Elijah
- Lee Ho-jae
- Lee Hwi-hyang
- Lee Jong-hyuk
- Lee Joon-gi
- Lee Kan-hee
- Lee Ki-young
- Lee Pil-mo
- Lee Seung-joon
- Lee Si-eon
- Lee Yi-kyung
- Min Young-won
- Moon Ji-in
- On Joo-wan
- Park Eun-hye
- Park Eun-seok
- Park Gun-hyung
- Park Hee-soon
- Park Hyuk-kwon
- Park Jin-joo
- Park Joo-mi
- Park Sang-myun
- Park Sang-won
- Park Seo-joon
- Park Sun-young
- Park Hae-jin
- Park Yeong-gyu
- Ra Mi-ran
- Ryu Seung-ryong
- Ryu Seung-soo
- Ryoo Seung-bum
- Seo Bum-june
- Seo Ji-seok
- Seol In-ah
- Shin Eun-jung
- Shin Goo
- Shin Ha-kyun
- Shin Seung-hwan
- Son Ye-jin
- Son Seung-won
- Song Chang-eui
- Song Jae-hee
- Sunwoo Eun-sook
- Sunwoo Jae-duk
- Woo Hee-jin
- Yang Hee-kyung
- Ye Ji-won
- Yoo Ara
- Yoo Dong-geun
- Yoo Gun
- Yoo Hae-jin
- Yoo Ho-jeong
- Yoo Se-rye
- Yoon Je-moon
- Yoon Ji-hye
- Yoon Jin-seo
- Yoon Yoo-sun

=== Music ===
- Chae Yeon
- Dia
- Jang Do-yoon
- Jang Gyu-ri
- Jang Wooyoung
- Jang Yun-jeong
- Kim Bum-soo
- Kim Gun-mo
- Kim Jae-wook
- Kim Min-seok
- Kim Se-yong
- Kim Yeon-woo
- Lee Bo-ram
- Lee Jin-ah
- Lee Ki-chan
- Lee Mu-jin
- Lee Sung-min
- Lim Jeong-hee
- Lu Han
- Maya
- Meng Jia
- Nana
- Park Shin-won
- Sangah Noona
- Wang Feifei

=== TV hosts ===
- Euna Lee
- Jang Yoon-ju
- Lee Hwi-jae
- Shin Dong-yup
- Yoo Jae-suk

=== Authors & screenwriters ===
- Choi In-hun
- Jang Jin
- Noh Hee-kyung
- Kim Ryeo-ryeong
- Shin Kyung-sook
- Kim Eun-sook
- Ha Seong-nan

=== Directors & filmmakers ===
- Han Jae-rim
- Jang Jin
- Jang Hang-jun
- Kim Jee-woon
- Lee Myung-se
- Lee Ok-seop
- Lee Hwan-kyung
- Roh Deok

=== Fashion designers ===
- Lie Sang Bong
