= Aroused by Gymnopedies =

Aroused By Gymnopedies
- Promotional release poster
- Japanese: ジムノペディに乱れる
- Directed by: Isao Yukisada
- Written by: Isao Yukisada; Anne Horiizumi
- Produced by: Saori Nishio; Seiichi Tanaka
- Starring: Itsuji Itao; Sumire Ashina; Izumi Okamura
- Cinematography: Takahiro Imai
- Edited by: Tsuyoshi Imai
- Music by: Tony McIntosh
- Production company: Django Film
- Distributed by: Nikkatsu
- Release date: 26 November 2016 (Japan)
- Running time: 83 minutes
- Country: Japan
- Language: Japanese

Aroused By Gymnopedies (Japanese: ジムノペディに乱れる, Hepburn: Gymnopedies ni Midareru) is a 2016 Japanese pornographic drama film written and directed by Isao Yukisada and starring Itsuji Itao, Sumire Ashina and Izumi Okamura. It was released on 26 November 2016.

== Cast ==
- Itsuji Itao
- Sumire Ashina
- Izumi Okamura
- Yuki Tayama
- Mayumi Tajima
- Noriko Kijima
- Sho Nishino
- Yuko Miyamoto
- Kisetsu Fujiwara
- Kenji Iwaya

== Production ==
In 2016, the films was announced by Nikkatsu as part of Roman Porno Reboot Project.

== Release ==
The film was screened at the 21st Busan International Film Festival and New York Asian Film Festival.

== Reception ==
James Marsh of the South China Morning Post gave the film 3.5/5 stars.

Elizabeth Kerr of The Hollywood Reporter and Richard Kuipers of Variety reviewed the film.

=== Accolades ===
Date	Award	Category	Recipients	Result	Ref.
2016	Blue Ribbon Awards	Best Newcomer	Izumi Okamura	Won	
