= The Dream of Water =

- Directed by: Farhad Mehranfar
- Written by: Farhad Mehranfar
- Produced by: Farhad Mehranfar
- Starring: Hossein Mahjoub; Payam Fazli, Maryam Nahvi; Behzad Jafarimazhab Haghighi
- Distributed by: Farabi Cinema Foundation
- Release date: May 12, 2016 (Iran International Green Film Festival)
- Running time: 95 minutes
- Country: Iran
- Language: Persian

The Dream of Water (in Persian : Khab-e Ab) is a 2016 Iranian drama film directed by Farhad Mehranfar. It has been shot in the desert areas of Mehriz/Yazd in Iran, and more than half of the film takes place in the underground labyrinth of ancient step wells. It premiered at the Iran International Green Film Festival (IIGFF).

== Plot ==
After the breakdown of his car in the desert, a young man who works for the water supply organization reaches an abandoned village. With the help of an old man who is also the remaining inhabitant of that region, he goes down the aqueduct. The old man's condition to get him out is finding the spring that he believes is hidden somewhere beneath the ground.

== Reception ==
It has been nominated for the best film and the best director in 5th Iran International Green Film Festival in May 2016.

It was screened in 21st Busan International Film Festival, in the Window on Asian Cinema section.
