= Lee Min-ji (actress, born 1988) =

South Korean actress (born 1988)

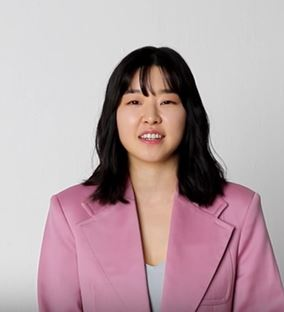
- Lee in 2019
- Born: November 1, 1988 (age 38); South Korea
- Occupation: Actress
- Years active: 2009–present
- Agent: Noon Company

Korean name
- Hangul: 이민지
- RR: I Minji
- MR: I Minji

Lee Min-ji (Korean: 이민지; born November 1, 1988) is a South Korean actress. She began her career acting in short films See You Tomorrow (2011) and Safe (2013) as well as independent feature film End of Animal (2011). In 2016, she had her first leading role in the drama film Jane (2016) for which she received several accolades including nominations at the 26th Buil Film Awards, 38th Blue Dragon Film Awards, and 23rd Chunsa Film Art Awards. On television, she is known for her roles in Schoolgirl Detectives (2014), Reply 1988 (2015–2016), The Red Sleeve (2021–2022), and Undercover High School (2025).

== Filmography ==
=== Film ===
Year	Title	Role	Notes	Ref.
2009	Nineteen in 21st Century	Na-ru	Short film	
2010	Incubation Period	Hyun-min	Short film	
2010	Broken Night	Cho-hye	Short film	
2011	See You Tomorrow	Hyo-jung	Short film	
2011	Slip	Mi-ae	Short film	
2011	End of Animal	Jang Soon-young		
2012	I Am a Fish	Mi-jung	Short film	
2012	The Fish Is Mute	Hyun-heup	Short film	
2012	Summer Semester	Park Joo-young	Short film	
2012	Picnic Together	Yoon-joo	Short film	
2012	Invitation	Soo-jung	Short film	
2013	Where Is My Pepper	Eun-ji	Short film	
2013	Dirty Harry	Oh Mi-ja	Short film	
2013	When the Moon Is on the Wane	Jae-ah	Short film	
2013	Safe	Min-ji	Short film	
2014	Shoooo	Ji-eun	Short film	
2014	VIB	Ye-eun's mother		
2014	Dear Emily	Man-soo's girlfriend		
2014	Romance in Seoul	Min-ji	Segment 6: "Dempsey Roll: Confessions"	
2014	Entangled	Jung-hye		
2015	Bitch Heart Asshole	Sam-joo		
2015	Chinatown	Stowaway mother		
2015	The Piper	Min-young		
2015	The Office	Eun-yi		
2016	Jane	So-hyun		
2018	The Vanished	Sook-kyung		
2021	Zombie Crush: Heyri	Min Hyun-ah		
2022	Confidential Assignment 2: International	NIS agent		

=== Television series ===
Year	Title	Role	Notes	Ref.
2014	Schoolgirl Detectives	Kim Ha-jae		
2015	Reply 1988	Jang Mi-ok		
2016	Entourage	Mi-na	Cameo (episode 14)	
2017	I'm Not a Robot	Sun-hye		
2018	100 Days My Prince	Kkeut-nyeo		
2019	My Lawyer, Mr. Jo 2: Crime and Punishment	Yoon So-mi		
2019	Psychopath Diary	Oh Min-joo		
2019	Eunju's Room		Cameo (episode 11)	
2020	Kkondae Intern	Kim Mi-jin	Cameo (episode 1 and 8)	
2021–2022	The Red Sleeve	Kim Bok-yeon		
2023	Poong, the Joseon Psychiatrist	Deok-hee	Cameo (episode 1–2); Season 2	
2023	Our Blooming Youth	Bok-soon		
2025	Undercover High School	Kim Mi-ran		
2025	A Hundred Memories			

=== Television show ===
Year	Title	Role	Notes	Ref.
2025–2026	Reply 1988 10th Anniversary	Cast member		

=== Web series ===
Year	Title	Role	Ref.
2014	Flirty Boy and Girl	Assistant director	

=== Music video appearances ===
Year	Song title	Artist	Ref.
2014	"Spring Waltz"	Jeon Je-duk	

== Accolades ==
=== Awards and nominations ===
Year	Award	Category	Nominated work	Result	Ref.
2010	7th Dubai International Film Festival	Special Mention (Muhr AsiaAfrica – Feature)	End of Animal	Won	
2011	37th Seoul Independent Film Festival	Independent Star Award	See You Tomorrow	Won	
2012	29th Busan International Short Film Festival	Best Actress	See You Tomorrow	Won	
2016	21st Busan International Film Festival	Actress of the Year Award	Jane	Won	
2017	26th Buil Film Awards	Best New Actress	Jane	Nominated	
2017	38th Blue Dragon Film Awards	Best New Actress	Jane	Nominated	
2018	23rd Chunsa Film Art Awards	Best Actress	Jane	Nominated	

=== Listicles ===
Name of publisher, year listed, name of listicle, and placement
Publisher	Year	Listicle	Placement	Ref.
Korean Film Council	2021	Korean Actors 200 (Note: Introduces 200 actors that best represent the present and future of Korean cinema to the people in the film industry all over the world.)	Included	
