= Lee Ok-seop =

South Korean filmmaker (born 1987)

- 이옥섭
- Born: May 29, 1987 (age 39); South Korea
- Occupations: Filmmaker film director screenwriter
- Years active: 2007 - present

Korean name
- Hangul: 이옥섭
- RR: I Okseop
- MR: I Oksŏp

Lee Ok-seop (Korean: 이옥섭; born May 29, 1987) is a South Korean film director and screenwriter.

== Career ==
Lee graduated from the Korea Academy of Film Arts after studying film at Seoul Institute of the Arts.

Lee continued to establish a unique presence in the industry through her collaborations with director Koo Kyo-hwan. For the 2018 film Maggie, she served as the producer, screenwriter, editor, and director. The film received significant acclaim, winning the Audience Award at the 44th Seoul Independent Film Festival, the CGV Art House Award at the Busan International Film Festival, and the KBS Independent Film Award.

In the summer of 2019, while planning to attend the Taiwan Film Festival, Koo and director Lee Ok-seop discussed the trip at Gyeongui Line Forest Park in Yeonnam-dong. The experience of falling asleep in the park and waking up at sunset reportedly served as the inspiration for the film Romeo: The Sin of Having Eyes.

== Personal life ==
Lee has been in a long-term relationship with director Koo Kyo-hwan since 2013. The two are fellow alums of the Seoul Institute of the Arts and began dating after Koo appeared in one of Lee's film projects. The pair co-manages 2x9HD, their YouTube channel, on which they showcase their creative collaborations. The channel features co-directed short films, experimental works, and vlogs documenting unique or overlooked aspects of daily life.

== Filmography ==
=== Short film ===
Filmmaking credits
Year	Title	Credited as				Notes	Ref.
Year	Title	Director	Screenwriter	Editor	Producer	Notes	Ref.
2012	Raz on Air	Yes	Yes	Yes	—N/a	Short film	
2014	A Dangerous Woman	Yes	Yes	Yes	—N/a	Short film	
2014	Now Playing Ep. 3. Love Docu	Co-director (Note: Teamed with Koo Kyo-hwan)	Co-writer	Co-editor	Co-producer	Omnibus film	
2015	Romance in Seoul Ep. Fly to the Sky	Co-director	Co-writer	Co-editor	Co-producer	Omnibus film	
2015	After School	Co-director	Co-writer	Co-editor	Co-producer	Short film	
2017	Girls on Top	Co-director	Co-writer	Co-editor	Co-producer	Short film	
2018	Leave a Message After Beep (Three)	Yes	Co-writer	Co-editor	Yes	Short film	
2019	Romeo: The Sin of Having Eyes	Yes	Yes	Yes	Yes	Short film	
2021	Film Director Koo Kyo-hwan's Vlog	Co-director	Co-writer	Co-editor	Co-producer	Short film	
2022	Replacement Driver Vlog	—N/a	—N/a	—N/a	Co-producer	Short film	
2022	Super Star Lee Hyo-ri	Co-director	Co-writer	Co-editor	Co-producer	Short film	

=== Feature film ===
Filmmaking credits
Year	Title	Credited as				Notes	Ref.
Year	Title	Director	Screenwriter	Editor	Producer	Notes	Ref.
2019	Maggie	Yes	Co-writer	Yes	—N/a	Feature film debut	
TBA	Your Country †	Co-director	Co-writer	Co-editor	Co-producer		

== Accolades ==
=== Awards and nominations ===
Awards and nominations
Award	Year	Category	Work	Result	Ref.
12th Asiana International Short Film Festival	2014	Domestic Competition Jury Special Award	A Dangerous Woman	Won	
14th Asiana International Short Film Festival	2016	Grand Prize (Domestic Competition)	Fly to the Sky	Won	
40th Blue Dragon Film Awards	2019	Best New Director	Maggie	Nominated	
29th Buil Film Awards	2020	Best New Director	Maggie	Nominated	
23rd Busan International Film Festival	2018	Citizen Critics' Award	Maggie	Won	
23rd Busan International Film Festival	2018	CGV Arthouse Award	Maggie	Won	
23rd Busan International Film Festival	2018	KBS Independent Film Award	Maggie	Won	
25th Chunsa Film Art Awards	2020	Best New Director	Maggie	Nominated	
48th International Film Festival Rotterdam	2019	Bright Future Competition	Maggie	Nominated	
19th Jeongdongjin Independent Film Festival	2017	Clink of Coins Award	Girls on Top	Won	
7th Muju Film Festival	2019	Korean Feature Competition	Maggie	Nominated	
14th Osaka Asian Film Festival	2019	Best Picture	Maggie	Won	
40th Seoul Independent Film Festival	2014	Audience Award	A Dangerous Woman	Won	
44th Seoul Independent Film Festival	2018	Audience Award	Maggie	Won	
7th Wildflower Film Awards	2020	Best Director (Narrative Films)	Maggie	Won	
7th Wildflower Film Awards	2020	Grand Prize	Maggie	Nominated	
