= Lee Dong-eun =

South Korean filmmaker (born 1978)

- Born: 1978 (age 47–48); Busan, South Korea
- Education: Sungkyunkwan University
- Occupations: Film director, screenwriter

Korean name
- Hangul: 이동은
- RR: I Dongeun
- MR: I Tongŭn

Lee Dong-eun (Korean: 이동은; born 1978) is a South Korean film director and screenwriter.

== Career ==
Lee, an economics major at Sungkyunkwan University, is from Myung Films Institute's Film Directing major graduating class. He developed and produced his first feature film In Between Seasons (2016) in Myung Films Lab. In Between Seasons world premiered and won KNN Award at the 21st Busan International Film Festival. His second feature Mothers (2017) is based on his 2015 book Your Request - My Other Mother where the script also won the annual spring literary contest conducted by The Dong-A Ilbo newspaper.

== Filmography ==
=== As director ===
- In Between Seasons (2016)
- Mothers (2017)

=== As screenwriter ===
- In Between Seasons (2016)
- Mothers (2017)

=== As producer ===
- In Between Seasons (2016)

=== As script coordinator ===
- Intruders (2013)

=== Production department ===
- The Customer Is Always Right (2006)
- Love Phobia (2006)
- Hanbando (2006)
- Fly High (2006)
- Puzzle (2006)
- Radio Star (2006)
- Righteous Ties (2006)
- Project Makeover (2007)
- A Good Day to Have an Affair (2007)
- Soo (2007)
- Secret Sunshine (2007)
- Hwang Jin Yi (2007)
- Love Now (2007)
- Mission Possible: Kidnapping Granny K (2007)
- Shadows in the Palace (2007)
- Venus and Mars (2007)
- Crazy Waiting (2008)
- Hellcats (2008)
