= Liu Zhenyun =

Chinese novelist and screenwriter (born 1958)

- 刘震云
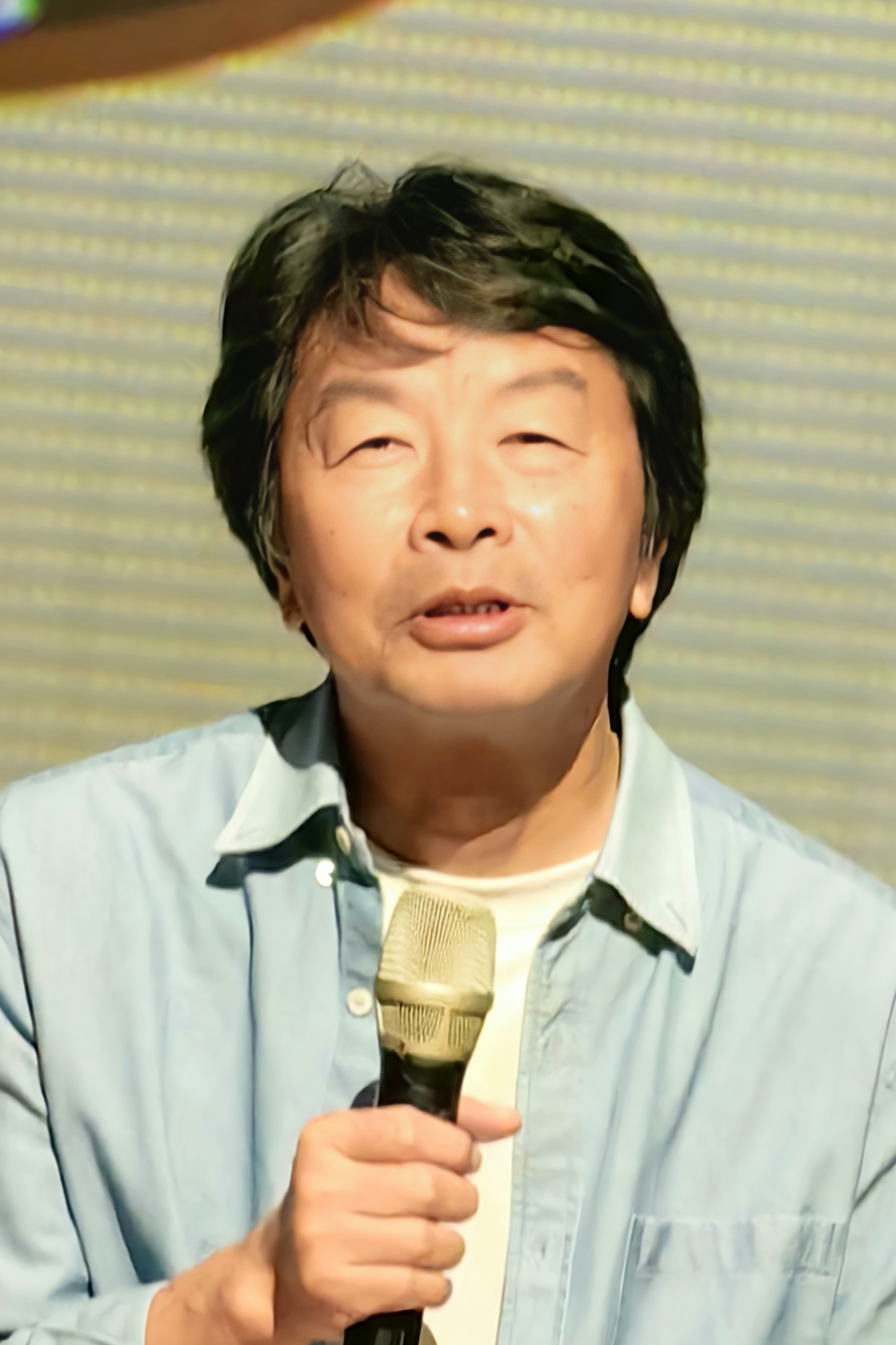
- Liu Zhenyun (2025)
- Born: May 1958 (age 68); Yanjin County, Henan, China
- Education: Peking University
- Occupation: Writer
- Spouse: Guo Jianmei 郭建梅
- Children: Liu Yulin
- Writing career
- Language: Chinese
- Notable work: One Sentence Is Ten Thousand Sentences
- Notable awards: Mao Dun Literature Prize; 2011

Liu Zhenyun (born May 1958) is a Chinese novelist and screenwriter. He is best known for his novel One Sentence Is Ten Thousand Sentences (awarded the 2011 Mao Dun Literature Prize) as well as his involvement with the many film adaptions of his books. Among these is I Am Not Madame Bovary, produced in collaboration with director Feng Xiaogang, a frequent collaborator of Liu. He is married to noted human rights activist Guo Jianmei.

== Life and work ==
Liu grew up in the village of Laozhuang in Yanjin County, Henan, China. At age 14, he left his village and joined the army. At age 20, he took the national college entrance exam, achieved the highest score in Henan province, and was accepted at Peking University. After graduation, he became a journalist. In the 1980s Liu began to concentrate seriously on his literary career, publishing his debut novella Tapu, in 1987.

He went on to publish novels such as Hometown, Regime and Blood (故乡天下黄花), Anecdotes in the Hometown (故乡相处流传), Material and Spirit in the Hometown (故乡面和花朵), Nonsense Talk (一腔废话), Cell Phone (手机), The Cook, the Crook, and the Real Estate Tycoon (我叫刘跃进).

His novels One Sentence Is Ten Thousand Sentences (一句顶一万句) and I Am Not Madame Bovary (我不是潘金莲) have sold over a million copies each. Someone to Talk To was awarded with Mao Dun Literature Prize in 2011 and has sold more than 1.6 million copies.

He has also authored novellas such as A Small Town: Tapu (塔铺), Recruits (新兵连), The Office (单位), Ground Covered with Chicken Feathers (一地鸡毛), Remembering 1942 (温故一九四二). Throughout the years, Liu's works have been translated into over 28 languages.

Many of Liu's books have been adapted into TV series and movies. He has written the screenplays for some of them including: A Small Town: Tapu, Ground Covered with Chicken Feathers, The Cook, the Crook, and the Real Estate Tycoon, Remembering 1942, Someone to Talk To, I Did Not Kill My Husband. Several of these adapted films have been awarded in the film festivals around the world, including the Toronto International Film Festival, the Rome Film Festival, the Busan International Film Festival, and the Hong Kong International Film Festival, among others.

== Themes and influences ==
Liu often credits his upbringing in Yanjin county as influencing his work, especially growing up in the shadow of the 1942 famine. He also is noted for including political criticism as well as advocating for social justice in his works.

== Works ==
Year	Title	Chinese Publisher	English Publisher	Translator
1989	A Small Town: Tapu (塔铺)	Writers Publishing House		
1991	Hometown, Regime and Blood (故乡天下黄花)	中国青年出版社 (China Youth Press)		
1992	Corridors of Power (官场)	华艺出版社 (Hua Yi Publishing House)	Chinese Literature Press	David Kwan
1992	Ground Covered with Chicken Feathers (一地鸡毛)	China Youth Press	Foreign Languages Press	David Kwan
1992	Official (官人)	长江文艺出版社 (Yangtze River Literature & Art Publishing House)		
1993	Anecdotes in the Hometown (故乡相处流传)	Hua Yi Publishing House		
1998	Material and Spirit in the Hometown (故乡面和花朵)	Hua Yi Publishing House		
2002	Nonsense Talk (一腔废话)	中国工人出版社 (China Workers Publishing House)		
2003	Cellphone (手机)	Writers Publishing House	MerwinAsia	Howard Goldblatt
2007	The Cook, the Crook, and the Real Estate Tycoon (我叫刘跃进)	Yangtze River Literature & Art Publishing House	Arcade Publishing	Howard Goldblatt & Sylvia Li-chun Lin
2009	Someone to Talk To (一句顶一万句) (also known as One Sentence Is Ten Thousand Sentences)	Yangtze River Literature & Art Publishing House	Duke University Press	Howard Goldblatt & Sylvia Li-chun Lin
2009	Remembering 1942 (温故一九四二)	People's Literature Publishing House	Arcade Publishing	Howard Goldblatt & Sylvia Li-chun Lin
2012	I Did Not Kill My Husband (我不是潘金莲)	Yangtze River Literature & Art Publishing House	Arcade Publishing	Howard Goldblatt & Sylvia Li-chun Lin
2017	The Era of Watermelon Eaters (吃瓜时代的儿女们)	Yangtze River Literature & Art Publishing House		
2021	One Day Three Autumns (一日三秋)	花城出版社 (Huacheng Publishing House)	Sinoist Press	Howard Goldblatt & Sylvia Li-chun Lin

== Awards ==
- 2011: Mao Dun Literature Prize, winner, Someone to Talk To
