= Isao Yukisada =

Japanese film director (born 1968)

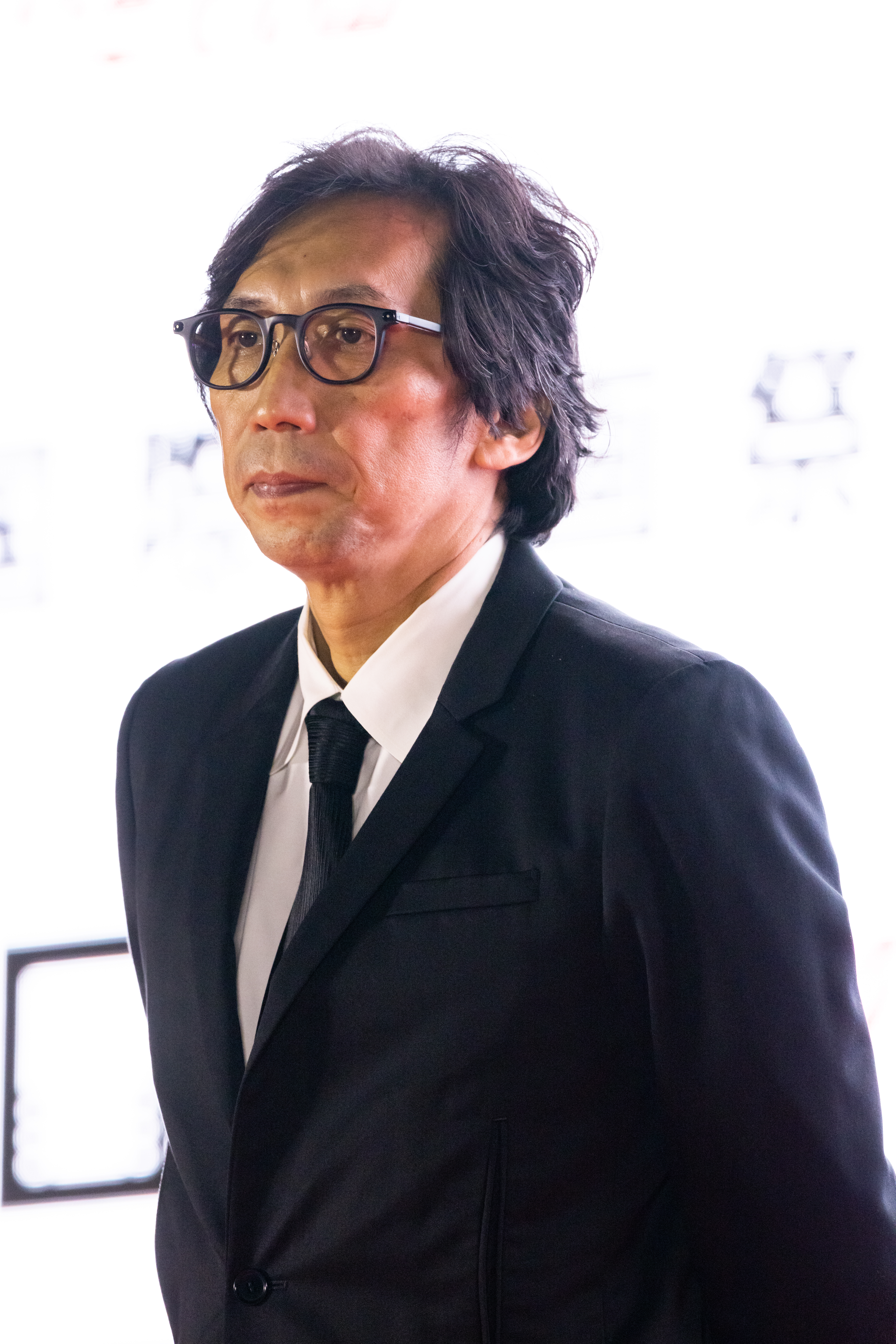
- Yukisada in 2022
- Born: August 3, 1968 (age 58); Kumamoto, Japan

Isao Yukisada (行定 勲, Yukisada Isao; born August 3, 1968) is a Japanese film director from Kumamoto. He served as assistant director on Shunji Iwai's Love Letter, April Story, and Swallowtail Butterfly.

== Filmography ==
=== As director ===
==== Film ====
- Open House (1998)
- Himawari (ひまわり) (Sunflower) (2000)
- Enclosed Pain, aka A Closing Day (閉じる日) (2000)
- Luxurious Bone (贅沢な骨) (2001)
- Go! (2001)
- Rock 'n' Roll Missing (2002)
- Justice (2002)
- Sinking into the Moon (2002)
- Seventh Anniversary (2003)
- A Day on the Planet (Kyō no dekigoto) (2003)
- Crying Out Love in the Center of the World (2004)
- Kita no Zeronen (Year One in the North) (2005)
- Spring Snow (2005)
- Yubisaki (2006)
- Toku no Sora ni Kieta (Into the Faraway Sky) (2007)
- Closed Note (2007)
- A Good Husband (2009)
- Parade (2009)
- Camellia (2010)
- Before the Vigil (2013)
- The Round Table (Entaku: Kokko, hito natsu no imajin) (2014)
- Five Minutes to Tomorrow (2014)
- Pink and Gray (2016)
- Aroused by Gymnopedies (2016)
- Asian Three-Fold Mirror 2016: Reflections (2016; segment: "Pigeon")
- Utsukushii hito saba? (2017)
- Narratage (2017)
- River's Edge (2018)
- That Moment, My Heart Cried (2019; segment: "Sea Breeze")
- The Cornered Mouse Dreams of Cheese (2020)
- Theatre: A Love Story (2020)
- Revolver Lily (2023)
- Kaede (2025)

==== Television ====
- Shiritsu tantei Hama Maiku (2002)
- Kanon (2003)
- Rōdoku kikō: Nippon no meisaku (2003, 1 episode)
- Women Play Twice (2010)
- Pātī wa owatta (2011)
- Monkey and Crab: Battle of the Heisei Era (Heisei sarukani gassenzu) (2014, 6 episodes)
- Perfect Family (2024)

=== As producer ===
==== Film ====
- Side by Side (2023)

== Accolades ==
=== Wins ===
- 2000: FIPRESCI Prize: Himawari
- 2001: Hochi Film Award: Best Film Go!
- 2001: Nikkan Sports Film Award: Best Director Go!
- 2002: Award of the Japanese Academy: Best Director for Go!
- 2002: Blue Ribbon Award: Best Director for Go!
- 2002: Kinema Junpo Award: Best Director and Film for Go!
- 2002: Golden Star: Go!
- 2002: FIPRESCI Prize: Go! - Palm Springs International Film Festival
- 2002: Festival Prize: Best Director for Go!
- 2010: "Fipresci Prize" - 2010 (60th) Berlin International Film Festival

=== Nominations ===
- 2005: Award of the Japanese Academy: Best Director for Crying Out Love in the Center of the World
- 2006: Award of the Japanese Academy: Best Director for Kita no Zeronen
