= Kim Jin-young (actress) =

South Korean actress (born 2003)

- Born: February 13, 2003 (age 23); South Korea
- Other name: Kim Jin-yeong
- Education: Korea National University of Arts
- Occupation: Actress
- Years active: 2016–present
- Agent: Snowball Entertainment
- Known for: The Fault Is Not Yours; All of Us Are Dead; Family Affair

Kim Jin-young (born February 13, 2003) is a South Korean actress. She appeared in films such as Sleeping, The Fault Is Not Yours, Family Affair and Girl Malsuk. She is best known for her role as Kim Ji-min in the 2022 South Korean television series, All of Us Are Dead.

== Early life and education ==
Kim Jin-young was born on February 12, 2003, in South Korea. She attended Korea National University of Arts. In 2016 she made her debut as an actress in film Sleeping and she joined Snowball Entertainment.

== Career ==
After her debut she appeared in film Family Affair as Gyu-rim with Jang Hye-ji and Lee Sang-hee the movie was premiered at 24th Busan International Film Festival and her performance was praised. The same year she appeared in film The Fault Is Not Yours as Hyun-jung with Yoon Chan-young, Son Sang-yeon and Kim Min-ju the film was premiered at Jeonju International Film Festival. In 2020 she appeared in music video opposite with Son Sang-yeon That's It by Hoppipolla her performance was praised by portraying the role of a student. In 2022 she became known for role in Netflix series All of Us Are Dead as Kim Ji-min.

== Filmography ==
=== Web series ===
Year	Title	Role	Ref.
2022	All of Us Are Dead	Kim Ji-min	
2025	Spirit Fingers	Yeom Se-ra	

=== Film ===
Year	Title		Role	Ref.
Year	English	Korean	Role	Ref.
2016	Sleeping	단잠	Jin-young	
2019	Family Affair	니나 내나	Gyu-rim	
2019	The Fault Is Not Yours	어제 일은 모두 괜찮아	Hyun-jung	
2020	Girl Malsuk	소녀 말숙	Jin-yeong	
2024	Tarot	타로	Dong-In	

=== Music video appearances ===
Year	Title	Artist	Length	Ref.
2020	"That's it"	Hoppipolla	3:00	
