= All of Us Are Dead (webtoon) =

South Korean webtoon

Creator Joo Dong-geun

All of Us Are Dead (Korean: 지금 우리 학교는; RR: Jigeum uri hakgyoneun), also known as School Attack in an early English translation, is a South Korean manhwa series written and illustrated by Joo Dong-geun. This webtoon was released on internet portal Naver WEBTOON from May 13, 2009 to November 2, 2011 with a total 130 chapters. Adapted into the live-action series, the story is about a group of high-schoolers surviving the zombie apocalypse in their school.

== Volumes ==
No.	Korean release date	Korean ISBN
1	July 31, 2017	978-89-54679-68-8
2	July 31, 2017	978-89-54679-69-5
3	July 31, 2017	978-89-54679-70-1
4	July 31, 2017	978-89-54679-71-8
5	July 31, 2017	978-89-54679-72-5

== Adaptation ==
In April 2020, the news of the production of a Netflix original series was announced, and director Lee Jae-gyu is in charge of directing it.

In July 2020, an official report came out that the final casting of the five main students who will lead the play has been confirmed. They are Yoon Chan-young as Lee Cheong-san, Park Ji-hu as Nam On-jo, Cho Yi-hyun as Choi Nam-ra, Lomon as Lee Su-hyeok, and Yoo In-soo as Yoon Gwi-nam.

The series was featured on the South Korean reality music show Webtoon Singer, premiered on the streaming service TVING on February 17, 2023, which featured K-pop artists' performances combining webtoons with extended reality technology.
