= The Fault Is Not Yours =

2019 South Korean film

- Promotional poster
- Directed by: Lee Seong-han
- Screenplay by: Lee Seong-han; Jeon Jung
- Based on: Yomawari Sensei by Osamu Mizutani
- Produced by: Lee Seong-han
- Starring: Kim Jae-cheol; Yoon Chan-young; Son Sang-yeon; Kim Min-ju
- Cinematography: Lee Seong-han
- Edited by: Shin Hyun-jin
- Music by: Lee Seong-han; Yang Sang-ho
- Production company: Booyoung Entertainment
- Distributed by: 300 & Co.
- Release dates: 4 May 2019 (Jeonju); 21 November 2019 (South Korea)
- Running time: 108 minutes
- Country: South Korea
- Language: Korean

The Fault Is Not Yours (Korean: 어제 일은 모두 괜찮아) is a 2019 South Korean drama film directed and produced by Lee Seong-han and written by Lee Seong-han and Jeon Jung. The film is based on the book Yomawari Sensei by Osamu Mizutani.

The film premiered at the Jeonju International Film Festival in May 2019, and was released in South Korea on November 21, 2019.

== Plot ==
Minjae is a teacher who feels responsible for dropout students, especially from his past where he fails to protect his students. Soon, he meets four students who are left out from school and their homes.

== Cast ==
- Kim Jae-cheol as Min-jae
- Yoon Chan-young as Joon-young / Ji-geun
- Son Sang-yeon as Yong-joo
- Kim Jin-young as Hyun-jung
- Kim Min-ju as Soo-yeon
- Lee Eun-saem as Mi-ran

== Awards and nominations ==
Year	Award	Category	Recipient	Result	Ref.
2020	Cine Rewind	Special New Actor of the Year	Kim Min-ju	Won	
