= Golden Child (band) =

South Korean boy band

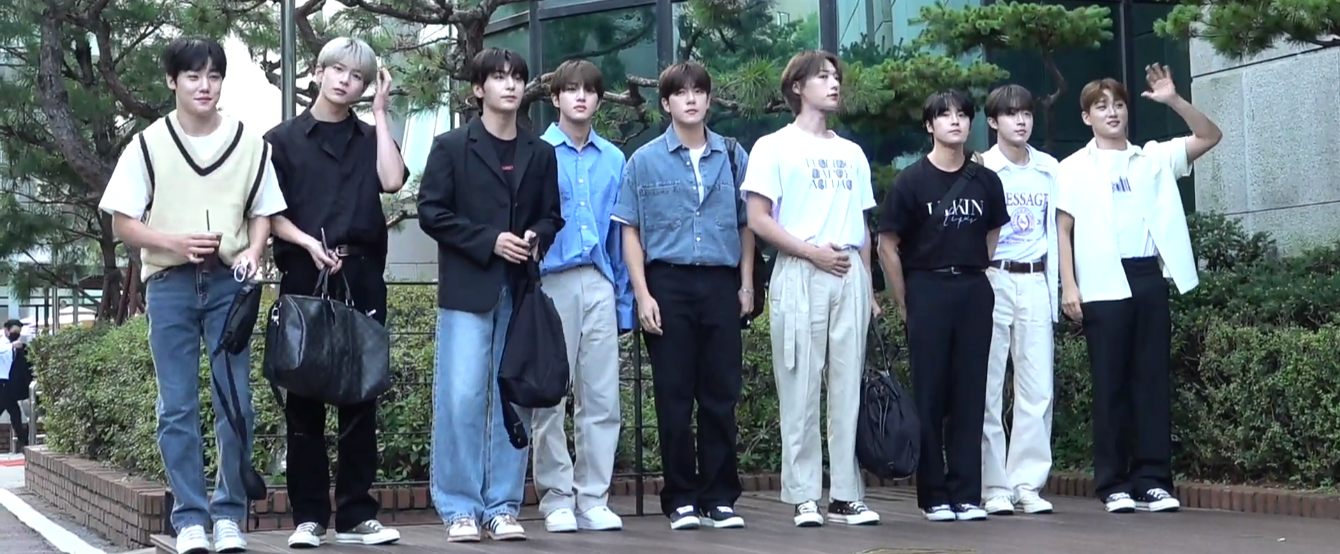
- Golden Child in August 2022

Background information
- Origin: Seoul, South Korea
- Genres: K-pop; dance-pop; future bass; reggaeton; Pop rock
- Years active: 2017–present
- Labels: Woollim; Mercury Tokyo
- Members: Lee Jang-jun; Hong Joo-chan
- Past members: Park Jae-seok; Tag; Kim Ji-beom; Choi Bo-min; Lee Dae-yeol; Y; Bae Seung-min; Bong Jae-hyun; Kim Dong-hyun
- Website: Official Website; JP Website

Golden Child (Korean: 골든차일드; abbreviated as GNCD or GolCha) is a South Korean boy band formed by Woollim Entertainment. The group consists of two members: Lee Jang-jun and Hong Joo-chan. Golden Child was originally an eleven-piece ensemble; members Park Jae-seok left in January 2018, and Tag, Kim Ji-beom, and Choi Bo-min left in August 2024. Lee Dae-yeol, Y, Bae Seung-min, Bong Jae-hyun, and Kim Dong-hyun left the group and Woollim on December 31, 2024.

They debuted on August 28, 2017, with the extended play (EP) Gol-Cha!.

== Name ==
The group's name, Golden Child, means "a perfect child that only exists once in 100 years', and it contains the meaning of leading the Korean music industry for 100 years while also leading the music trends for the next 100 years".

== Career ==
=== 2017: W Project, 2017 Woollim Pick and debut with Gol-cha! ===
In January 2017, Woollim Entertainment launched pre-debut project for trainees, W Project. Five members of Golden Child (Joochan, Jangjun, Tag, Daeyeol, Donghyun) and former member Jaeseok were introduced under the pre-debut project.

On May 15, Woollim Entertainment launched new boy group Golden Child, their first boy group in seven years since Infinite. On May 17, the eleven member names of the group's line-up were revealed. On May 22, Woollim Entertainment dropped "class photos" concept for Golden Child and confirmed that they would have their pre-debut reality show 2017 Woollim Pick. On August 9, it was announced that Golden Child would make a cameo appearance on 20th Century Boy and Girl.

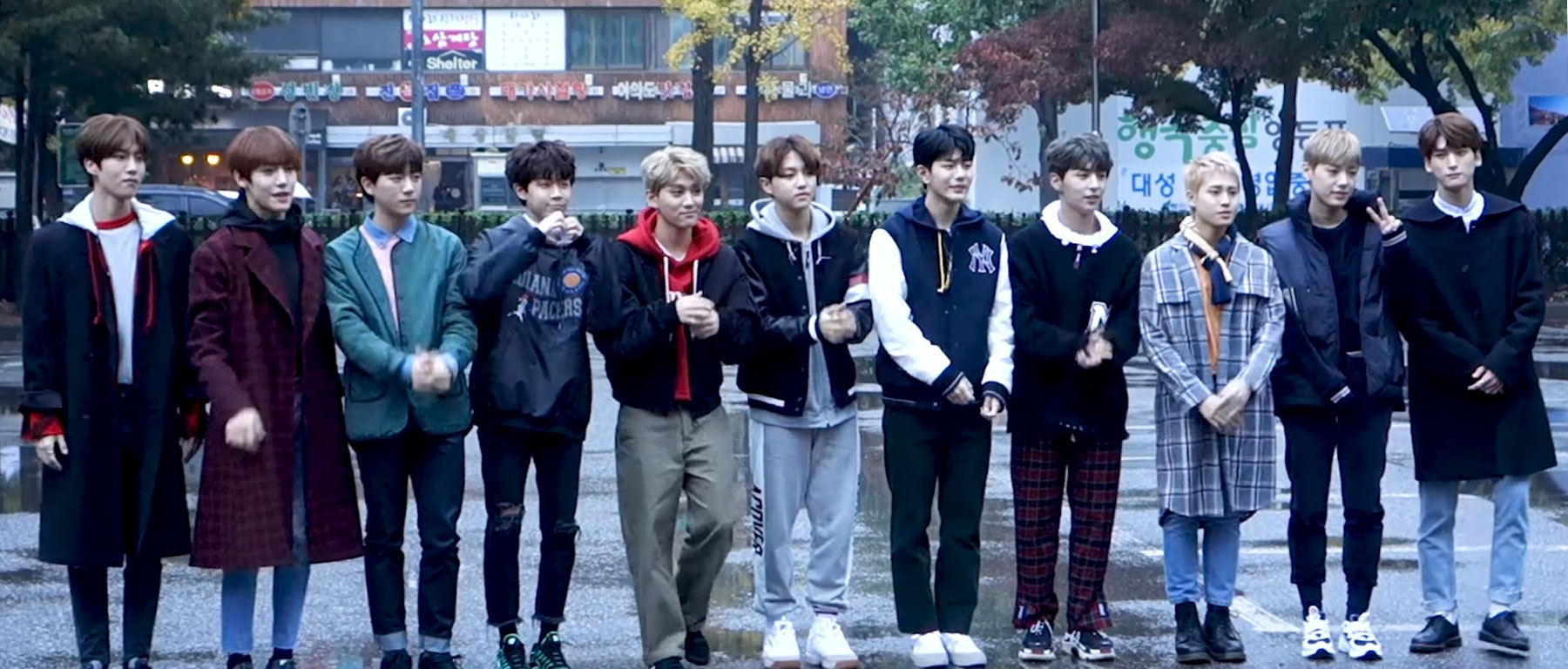
Golden Child at KBS

Golden Child officially debuted on August 28 with their first EP Gol-cha!, with a total of six tracks including the title track "DamDaDi". Their debut showcase was held at the Blue Square iMarket Hall on the same day as the album's release. On September 1, Golden Child made their official debut stage on the music program Music Bank, performing title track "DamDaDi" and "I Love You So". On September 17, the EP has reached No. 1 on Japan's largest music site Tower Records' daily chart. On October 16, they released a soundtrack Love Letter on 20th Century Boy and Girl.

=== 2018: Reorganization as ten members, Miracle, Goldenness and Wish ===
On January 6, 2018, it was announced that Jaeseok had left the group due to health issues. The remaining ten members continued as a group and released their second EP, Miracle, on January 29. The EP contains six tracks including the title track "It's U". Their comeback showcase was held at the Blue Square iMarket Hall on the same day as the album's release. They continue the promotions with the release of the music video for "Lady" from their second EP. On April 13, they officially finished their three-month promotions.

On May 22, Golden Child held their first fanmeeting Golden Day to celebrate their debut anniversary in Seoul, South Korea. They also held Japanese fanmeeting in Nagoya and Tokyo on May 24 and May 25 respectively. On June 24, Golden Child performed at KCON NY 2018. On 11 August, Golden Child performed as the line-up for KCON LA 2018. Continuously, they confirmed their line-up for the first ever KCON Thailand on September 29, 2018.

On May 4, Their official fanclub was announced with the name 'Goldenness', following with the release of their first single album Goldenness on July 4, which contained three tracks including the lead single "Let Me".

At the Fanclub Inauguration Ceremony named 'Golden Child Cheerful Geumdong Time' on 14 October, they surprised their fans by announcing their comeback. On October 24, Golden Child released their 3rd EP WISH with more mature image. The EP had 7 tracks including the title track "Genie".

=== 2019–2020: Re-boot, Road to Kingdom, Take a Leap and Pump It Up ===
On May 2, 2019, Golden Child released their first digital single "Spring Again" as a gift for fans during their hiatus. Golden Child's first web sitcom Crazy Petty Housemate began airing starting October 16 on Lululala Story Lab media platforms and would be have eight-episode aired every Wednesday and Saturday.

On November 18, Golden Child released their first studio album Re-boot. The album contains twelve tracks including the title track "Wannabe". Golden Child won their first-ever music program win on December 26, through M Countdown.

Golden Child successfully held their first solo concert, Future and Past on January 18 and 19, 2020. A repackaged version of their first studio album titled Without You was released on January 29, 2020, consisting of the title track of the same name.

On March 20, it was announced that the group will join Mnet's reality television competition Road to Kingdom. They were the first group eliminated in the fifth episode. On May 31, Golden Child and other Woollim Entertainment artists released a collaboration single Relay under the name With Woollim.

On June 23, Golden Child released their fourth EP, Take a Leap, containing seven tracks including the title track "One (Lucid Dream)". On August 18, it was announced that Golden Child will hold an online concert, NOW, on September 13.

On September 13, it was announced that Golden Child will make a comeback on October 7 with their second single album Pump It Up containing three tracks including the title track of the same name.

On December 17, Jaehyun tested positive for COVID-19. On December 31, it was announced that Jaehyun had tested negative for COVID-19 and Golden Child will resume activities.

=== 2021: Yes., Game Changer and Ddara ===
On January 2, it was announced that Golden Child would return with their fifth EP, Yes. and its lead single "Burn It" on January 25. "Burn It" charted on iTunes' Top Albums Chart, reaching a spot in the top 10 in 11 regions.

On June 18, it was announced that Golden Child will hold an online/offline concert, Summer Breeze, on July 17 and 18. However, it was postposed due to rising COVID-19 cases in Korea.

On June 26, Golden Child participated and performed at the 2021 Dream Concert. The 2021 Dream Concert was held at Sangam World Cup Stadium in Seongsan-dong, Mapo-gu, Seoul.

On August 2, Golden Child released their second studio album, Game Changer and its lead single "Ra Pam Pam". The mv reached 20M views in YouTube within 3 days after its release.

On August 9, Hanteo Chart announced that the album Game Changer sold more than 126,000 copies in the first week and became the album with highest 1st week sales under Woollim Ent surpassing 'Yes' by Golden Child. Hanteo Chart issued an official certificate which proves the Initial Chodong sales amount over 100,000 copies. Thus Golden Child proved themselves as one of the main group representing K-pop by showing 1.8 times growth compared to the previous album YES 's Initial Chodong record (71,485 copies).

The title track 'Ra Pam Pam' debuted at #2 on Billboard World Digital Song Sales Chart and #37 on Billboard Digital Song Sales Chart. Golden Child is the third K-pop Boy Group to be named on the Chart and holding the title for the highest debut record. 'Ra Pam Pam' topped the Mongolian iTunes top song after its release at 6 p.m. on August 2. In addition, the 'Game Changer' ranked First in Turkey on the iTunes top K-pop album chart, Second in Israel, Thailand, Australia, Singapore, United States, Spain, Indonesia and Malaysia, Third in Hong Kong and Canada, and thus ranked within TOP5 in 11 countries and regions.

On October 5, Golden Child released the repackaged version of their second studio album titled Ddara, and its lead single of the same name.

=== 2022–2024: Japanese debut, Aura, and hiatus ===
On January 16, Golden Child performed in Expo 2020 Dubai's Korea National Day K-pop concert.

On January 26, Golden Child made their Japanese debut with the single "A Woo!!". "A Woo!!" debuted at number one on the Oricon Weekly Singles Chart, Billboard Japan's Singles Sales Chart (January 24–26), and Tower Records' National Sales Singles Chart.

Golden Child held an online/offline concert, Play, on February 5 and 6 at KBS Arena. During the concert, Daeyeol announced that he would be enlisting for his mandatory military service soon, although without a set date.

On May 11, Golden Child released their second Japanese single "Rata-Tat-Tat". In support of their first Japanese comeback, Golden Child held a two-day showcase in Tokyo on April 30 and May 1, 2022, at the Maihama Amphitheater. "Rata-Tat-Tat" debuted at number three on the Oricon Daily Singles Chart.

On May 23, Tag was admitted to a general hospital on May 18 after being diagnosed with a liver condition and underwent a thorough examination. Therefore, Golden Child's future schedules will operate as an 8-member system. On June 27, Tag's health conditions improved and was confirmed to be returning to activities, however, he will be excluded in Golden Child's current schedules overseas.

On June 24, Golden Child began their first US concert tour with stops in 10 cities.

On July 10, Golden Child performed in New York City's Central Park SummerStage Concert Program as part of the line-up for the Korea Cultural Center of NY's Korea Gayoje.

On July 30, Golden Child performed in London as part of the lineup at the MIK Festival, the first outdoor K-pop music festival in Europe. Woollim Entertainment also announced that Golden Child will join Weverse to communicate with fans on the platform.

On August 8, Golden Child released their sixth EP, Aura with its title track "Replay".

Golden Child were part of the line-up for "MBC Idol Radio Live in Tokyo" on October 20, and on October 21, Golden Child performed in Manila as part of the line-up for the "I-Pop U 22" concert.

On August 27, 2024, Woollim Entertainment announced that the group would be re-organized as a 7-member group, as members Tag, Kim Ji-beom and Choi Bo-min departed from the group, after they decided not renew their contract. The remaining members were confirmed to have renewed their contract, except Lee Dae-yeol and Y. All remaining members, except Lee Jang-jun and Hong Joo-chan, left Woollim Entertainment on December 31, 2024.

== Other ventures ==
=== Ambassadorship ===
On December 6, 2017, Golden Child was officially appointed as the new ambassadors for "Korea Scout Association" for 2018.

=== Philanthropy ===
On November 30, 2018, Golden Child performed at Charity Concert for Palu, Sigi and Donggala in Indonesia. All profits from the concert were donated to the victims of earthquake and tsunami in Palu, Sigi and Donggala.

== Members ==
On January 6, 2018, Woollim Entertainment announced Jaeseok had left the group due to health issues.

On March 29, 2022, Lee Dae-yeol became the first member of the group to participate in mandatory military enlisting in the 3rd Army Brigade. He was officially discharged on September 28, 2023.

Y enlisted on March 20, 2023, and was appointed chief of the trainees at Nonsan Training Center. He was discharged on September 19, 2024.

On August 27, 2024, the group reformed as a seven-member group following Tag, Jibeom and Bomin announcing they were to leave the group. In December 2024, it was announced that Jangjun and Joochan continue their activities with the company while the other five members left the company, although there no confirmation about the five member left from the group.

Current (active)

- Lee Jang-jun (이장준) – rapper
- Hong Joo-chan (홍주찬) – vocalist
- Lee Dae-yeol (이대열) – leader, vocalist, dancer
- Y (와이) – vocalist
- Bae Seung-min (배승민) – vocalist
- Bong Jae-hyun (봉재현) – vocalist
- Kim Dong-hyun (김동현) – dancer, vocalist

Former

- Park Jae-seok (박재석) – vocalist, dancer
- Tag (태그) – rapper
- Kim Ji-beom (김지범) – vocalist
- Choi Bo-min (최보민) – vocalist, dancer

== Discography ==
=== Studio albums ===
Title	Details	Peak chart positions		Sales
Title	Details	KOR	JPN	Sales
Re-boot	Released: November 18, 2019; Label: Woollim Entertainment; Formats: CD, digital download, streaming	8	—	KOR: 21,743
Game Changer	Released: August 2, 2021; Label: Woollim Entertainment; Formats: CD, digital download, streaming; Track listing: 1. "Game Changer"; 2. "Ra Pam Pam"; 3. "Bottom of the Ocean"; 4. "Fanfare" (빵빠레); 5. "Singing in the Rain" (Joo Chan & Bo Min); 6. "Game" (Tag & Ji Beom); 7. "Spell" (주문을 걸어); 8. "Out the Window" (창밖으로 우리가 흘러) (Dae Yeol Solo); 9. "Poppin'" (Y & Jang Jun); 10. "That Feeling" (느낌적인 느낌) (Seung Min & Dong Hyun & Jae Hyun); 11. "I Know" (난 알아요)	2	30	KOR: 148,177; JPN: 1,542

=== Reissues ===
Title	Details	Peak chart positions	Sales
Title	Details	KOR	Sales
Without You	Released: January 29, 2020; Label: Woollim Entertainment; Formats: CD, digital download, streaming	4	KOR: 22,953
Ddara	Released: October 5, 2021; Label: Woollim Entertainment; Formats: CD, digital download, streaming; Track listing: 1. "Game Changer"; 2. "Ra Pam Pam"; 3. "Ddara"; 4. "Oasis"; 5. "Bottom of the Ocean"; 6. "Fanfare" (빵빠레); 7. "Singing in the Rain" (Joo Chan & Bo Min); 8. "Game" (Tag & Ji Beom); 9. "Spell" (주문을 걸어); 10. "Out the Window" (창밖으로 우리가 흘러) (Dae Yeol Solo); 11. "Poppin'" (Y & Jang Jun); 12. "That Feeling" (느낌적인 느낌) (Seung Min & Dong Hyun & Jae Hyun); 13. "I Know" (난 알아요)	12	KOR: 42,432

=== Extended plays ===
Title	Details	Peak chart positions		Sales
Title	Details	KOR	JPN	Sales
Gol-Cha!	Released: August 28, 2017; Label: Woollim Entertainment; Formats: CD, digital download, streaming; Track listing: 1. "Gol-Cha! " 2. "DamDaDi" (담다디); 3. "With Me" (나랑해); 4. "What Happened?" (내 눈을 의심해); 5. "I Love You So" (네가 너무 좋아); 6. "Sea"	3	—	KOR: 27,808; JPN: 340
Miracle	Released: January 29, 2018; Label: Woollim Entertainment; Formats: CD, digital download, streaming; Track listing: 1. "Miracle" (奇跡 (기적)); 2. "It's U" (너라고); 3. "Lady"; 4. "Crush"; 5. "All Day" (모든 날); 6. "I'm Falling"	3	22	KOR: 46,281; JPN: 3,812
Wish	Released: October 24, 2018; Label: Woollim Entertainment; Formats: CD, digital download, streaming; Track listing: 1. "Wish"; 2. "Genie"; 3. "Eyes on You" (너); 4. "I See U" (너만 보인다); 5. "Listen" (들어봐 줄래); 6. "YTMOB (You Turn Me On Baby)" (넌 모를 거야); 7. "Would U Be My"	3	19	KOR: 45,307; JPN: 8,328
Take a Leap	Released: June 23, 2020; Label: Woollim Entertainment; Formats: CD, digital download, streaming; Track listing: 1. "Take Off"; 2. "One (Lucid Dream)"; 3. "OMG" (훅 들어와); 4. "Moment" (혼잣말); 5. "Make Me Love"; 6. "H.E.R" (그녀에게); 7. "Pass Me By"	6	26	KOR: 65,220; JPN: 2,081
Yes.	Released: January 25, 2021; Label: Woollim Entertainment; Formats: CD, digital download, streaming	2	42	KOR: 113,966
Aura	Released: August 8, 2022; Label: Woollim Entertainment; Formats: CD, digital download, streaming; Track listing: 1. "Aura"; 2. "Replay"; 3. "Knocking on My Door"; 4. "3! 6! 5!"; 5. "Purpose"; 6. "Miracle"	7	—	KOR: 89,689

=== Single albums ===
Title	Details	Peak chart positions	Sales
Title	Details	KOR	Sales
Goldenness	Released: July 4, 2018; Label: Woollim Entertainment; Formats: CD, digital download, streaming; Track listing: 1. "Let Me"; 2. "If"; 3. "Thank You"	6	KOR: 33,953
Pump It Up	Released: October 7, 2020; Label: Woollim Entertainment; Formats: CD, digital download, streaming; Track listing: 1. "Pump It Up"; 2. "That Guy" (그 자식); 3. "Lean on Me" (너의 뒤에서)	2	KOR: 98,239
Feel Me	Expected: November 2, 2023; Label: Woollim Entertainment; Formats: CD, digital download, streaming; Track listing: 1. "Feel Me"; 2. "Blind Love"; 3. "Dear"	10	KOR: 41,307

=== Singles ===
Title	Year	Peak chart positions					Sales	Album
Title	Year	KOR		JPN	US Dig.	US World	Sales	Album
Title	Year	Circle	Hot	JPN	US Dig.	US World	Sales	Album
"DamDaDi" (담다디)	2017	—	—	—	—	—	—N/a	Gol-Cha!
"It's U" (너라고)	2018	—	—	—	—	—	—N/a	Miracle
"Let Me"	2018	—	—	—	—	—	—N/a	Goldenness
"Genie"	2018	—	—	—	—	—	—N/a	Wish
"Spring Again" (그러다 봄)	2019	—	—	—	—	—	—N/a	Non-album single
"Wannabe"	2019	—	—	—	—	—	—N/a	Re-boot
"Without You"	2020	—	—	—	—	—	—N/a	Without You
"One (Lucid Dream)"	2020	— (Note: "One (Lucid Dream)" did not enter the Gaon Digital Chart, but appeared at number 77 on the component Download chart.)	—	—	—	—	—N/a	Take a Leap
"Pump It Up"	2020	— (Note: "Pump It Up" did not enter the Gaon Digital Chart, but appeared at number 19 on the component Download chart.)	—	—	—	—	—N/a	Pump It Up
"Burn It" (안아줄게)	2021	89	43	—	—	—	—N/a	Yes.
"Ra Pam Pam"	2021	— (Note: "Ra Pam Pam" did not enter the Gaon Digital Chart, but appeared at number 9 on the component Download chart.)	—	—	37	2	—N/a	Game Changer
"Ddara"	2021	— (Note: "Ddara" did not enter the Gaon Digital Chart, but appeared at number 15 on the component Download chart.)	—	—	—	—	—N/a	Ddara
"Replay"	2022	— (Note: "Replay" did not enter the Circle Digital Chart, but appeared at number 24 on the component Download chart.)	—	—	—	—	—N/a	Aura
"Feel Me"	2023	— (Note: "Feel Me" did not enter the Circle Digital Chart, but peaked at number 64 on the component Download Chart.)	—	—	—	—	—N/a	Feel Me
Japanese
"A Woo ! "	2022	—	—	1	—	—	JPN: 11,756 (Phy.)	Non-album singles
"Rata-Tat-Tat"	2022	—	—	7	—	—	JPN: 8,697 (Phy.)	Non-album singles
"Crayon"	2023	—	—	10	—	—	JPN: 5,838 (Phy.)	Non-album singles
"—" denotes releases that did not chart or were not released in that region.

=== Other releases ===
Title	Year	Member(s)	Album
Soundtrack appearances
"Love Letter"	2017	All	20th Century Boy and Girl OST
"Love Shaker"	2020	Y, Seungmin, Joochan	Best Mistake 2 OST
"Come With Me"	2020	Y, Jibeom	Lonely Enough to Love OST
"Love Your Everything"	2022	Jibeom, Joochan	Moonshine OST
Collaborations
"Relay" (이어달리기) (with Infinite's Kim Sung-kyu, Lovelyz, Rocket Punch, Drippin)	2020	All	Non-album singles
"Under the Sky of Suncheon" (순천의 하늘 아래에서) (with Lovelyz (Note: Credited under Lovelyz, but only sung by Baby Soul and Ryu Su-jeong.))	2020	Tag, Joochan	Non-album singles

== Videography ==
=== Music videos ===
Year	Title	Director(s)	Ref.
2017	"DamDaDi"	Korlio (August Frogs)	
2018	"It's U"	Sunny Visual	
2018	"Lady"	Sunny Visual	
2018	"Let Me"	Sunny Visual	
2018	"Genie"	Sunny Visual	
2019	"Spring Again"		
2019	"Wannabe"	Zanybros	
2020	"Without You"	Zanybros	
2020	"One (Lucid Dream)"	Zanybros	
2020	"Pump It Up"	Zanybros	
2021	"Burn It (안아줄게)"	Zanybros	
2021	"Breathe"	Zanybros	
2021	"Ra Pam Pam"	Zanybros	
2021	"Ddara"	Kim Jak Young (Flexible Pictures)	
2022	"Replay"	Korlio (August Frogs)	
2023	"Feel Me"	Zanybros	
Japanese			
2022	"A Woo"	Zanybros	
2022	"Rata Tat Tat"	Zanybros	

== Filmography ==
=== Film ===
Year	Title	Notes	Ref.
2018	Golden Movie	Short Film	

=== Television series ===
Year	Title	Role	Notes	Ref.
2017	20th Century Boy and Girl	Themselves	Cameo	

=== Reality series ===
Year	Title	Notes	Ref.
2017	2017 Woollim Pick	Golden Child's First Reality Show	
2017	Ring It! Golden Child!	Aired every Tuesday. Hosted by Kim Shin-young	
2018	Gol-Cha's Holiday		
2018	Gol-Cha's Holiday Season 2		
2018	Let's Go Korea Gangwon-do; Infinite x Golden Child Battle Tour	Dae-yeol, Y, Jang-jun (with Infinite's Sung-yeol and Sung-jong)	
2018	Make A Wish		
2019	Tsukuru Miracle Golcha TV		
2019	Gol-Cha's Holiday Season 3		
2020	2020 Crazy Petty Reunion (Uhadong)	Variety-reality show showing their life 10 years after Uhame	
2020	Idol Workshop Golden Child		
2022	2022 Winter Golympics	7 episodes	

=== Web series ===
Year	Title	Role	Notes	Ref.
2019	Crazy Petty Housemate (Uhame)	Themselves	Golden Child's First Web Sitcom	

== Concerts ==
=== Golden Child 1st Concert - Future and Past ===
Date	City	Country	Venue
January 18, 2020	Seoul	South Korea	BlueSquare iMarket Hall
January 19, 2020	Seoul	South Korea	BlueSquare iMarket Hall

=== Golden Child Ontact Concert - NOW ===
Date	City	Country	Platform
September 13, 2020	Seoul	South Korea	MyMusicTaste, Seezn

=== 2021 Golden Child Concert - Summer Breeze (Cancelled) ===
Date	City	Country	Venue / Platform
July 17, 2021	Seoul	South Korea	BlueSquare Mastercard Hall. MyMusicTaste
July 18, 2021	Seoul	South Korea	BlueSquare Mastercard Hall. MyMusicTaste

=== 2022 Golden Child Concert - Play ===
Date	City	Country	Venue / Platform
February 5, 2022	Seoul	South Korea	KBS Arena. Kavecon
February 6, 2022	Seoul	South Korea	KBS Arena. Kavecon

=== 2022 Golden Child US Concert Tour - Play ===
Date	City	Country	Venue / Platform
June 24, 2022	San Jose	U.S.A.	Montgomery Theater
June 26, 2022	Los Angeles	U.S.A.	Teragram Ballroom
June 28, 2022	Denver	U.S.A.	Fox Theater
June 30, 2022	Dallas	U.S.A.	South Side Music Hall
July 2, 2022	Minneapolis	U.S.A.	The Lyric at Skyway Theater
July 4, 2022	Chicago	U.S.A.	Concord Music Hall
July 6, 2022	Nashville	U.S.A.	The Basement East
July 8, 2022	Atlanta	U.S.A.	Center Stage Theater
July 10, 2022	New York	U.S.A.	Central Park SummerStage
July 11, 2022	Philadelphia	U.S.A.	Keswick Theater

== Awards and nominations ==
Year	Award	Category	Nominated work	Result	Ref.
2017	Mnet Asian Music Awards	Golden Child	Best New Male Artist	Nominated	
2017	Mnet Asian Music Awards	Golden Child	Qoo10 Artist of the Year	Nominated	
2018	Fandom School Awards	Golden Child	The Best New Artist	Won	
2018	Korea Culture & Entertainment Awards	Golden Child	K-pop Singer Award	Won	
2018	MTV Europe Music Awards	Golden Child	Best Korean Act	Nominated	
2018	Seoul Music Awards	Golden Child	New Artist Award	Nominated	
2018	Seoul Music Awards	Golden Child	Popularity Award	Nominated	
2018	Seoul Music Awards	Golden Child	Hallyu Special Award	Nominated	
2018	V Live Awards	Golden Child	Global Rookie Top 5	Won	
2021	Asia Artist Awards	Golden Child	Choice Award	Won	
2021	Golden Disc Awards	Golden Child	Album Bonsang - Game Changer	Nominated	
2021	Hanteo Music Awards	Golden Child	Artist Award - Male Group	Nominated	
2021	Hanteo Music Awards	Golden Child	WhosFandom Award	Nominated	
2021	Seoul Music Awards	Golden Child	Main Prize (Bonsang)	Nominated	
2021	Seoul Music Awards	Golden Child	K-wave Special Award	Nominated	
2022	K Global Heart Dream Awards	Golden Child	Best Music Video	Won	
