= Re-boot (album) =

2019 Studio album by Golden Child

Studio album by Golden Child
- Released: November 18, 2019
- Genre: K-pop
- Length: 40:23
- Language: Korean
- Label: Woollim Entertainment

Golden Child chronology
| Wish (2018) | Re-boot (2019) | Take A Leap (2020) |

Singles from Re-boot
- 1. "Wannabe" Released: November 18, 2019

Music video
- "Wannabe" on YouTube

Repackaged album cover

Singles from Without You
- 1. "Without You" Released: January 29, 2020

Music video
- "Without You" on YouTube

Re-boot is the first studio album by South Korean boy band Golden Child. It was released on November 18, 2019, through Woollim Entertainment and distributed by Kakao M. It contains twelve songs, including its lead single "Wannabe".

A repackage titled Without You was released on January 29, 2020, with the addition of two new songs, including the lead single of the same name.

== Background and release ==
On October 31, 2019, Woollim Entertainment revealed a new logo for Golden Child in a short video, featuring the team name written with a strong gold color with an addition of the mysterious word "Re-boot". Later, on November 4, the mysterious word was confirmed to be the name for their first full-length album when Woollim released the first set of individual concept photos. On November 5, they revealed the tracklist for the album, revealing "Wannabe" as the lead single. They also released the track preview for the track "Re-boot" and the lead single "Wannabe". Then, from November 8–11, they would release the track preview for "Lately", "Compass", "No Matter What", and "A Song For Me" consecutively. On November 11, they also released the second set of individual concept photos. On November 12–13, they released the track preview for "Spring Again" and "She's My Girl". On November 13, the first music video teaser for "Wannabe" was also released. On November 14, they released the track preview for "Our Heaven". On November 15, apart from releasing the track preview for "Fantasia", they also released the second music video teaser for "Wannabe". After releasing the track preview for "Don't Run Away" and "Go Together" on November 16–17 consecutively, they officially released Re-boot and the music video for "Wannabe" on November 18.

== Track listing ==
Re-boot tracklist
| No. | Title | Lyrics | Music | Arrangement | Length |
|---|---|---|---|---|---|
| 1. | "Re-boot" | | BLSSD | BLSSD | 1:28 |
| 2. | "Wannabe" | BLSSD | BLSSD | BLSSD | 3:26 |
| 3. | "Lately" (느껴져) | 1Take; TAK; Jang Jun; TAG | 1Take; TAK | 1Take; TAK | 3:25 |
| 4. | "Compass" (나침반) | TENTEN; Jang Jun; TAG | TENTEN | TENTEN | 3:06 |
| 5. | "No Matter What" (Jang Jun, TAG) (Feat. Joo Chan) | 1Take; TAK; Jang Jun; TAG | 1Take; TAK; Paper Planet | 1Take; TAK; Paper Planet | 3:23 |
| 6. | "A Song For Me" (문제아) (Joo Chan solo) | Park Young-jun | Park Young-jun | Park Young-jun | 3:47 |
| 7. | "Spring Again" (그러다 봄) | Jae Yoon; Jang Jun; TAG | Jae Yoon | Jae Yoon | 3:51 |
| 8. | "She's My Girl" | Hwang Hyun; Shin Agnes; Jang Jun; TAG | Hwang Hyun | Hwang Hyun | 3:18 |
| 9. | "Our Heaven" (둘만의 천국) (Dae Yeol, Seung Min, Dong Hyun) | C-no; Woong Kim | C-no; Woong Kim | C-no; Woong Kim | 3:36 |
| 10. | "Fantasia" (Y solo) | CODE 9; PURAVIDA | CODE 9; PURAVIDA | CODE 9 | 3:19 |
| 11. | "Don't Run Away" (도망 가지마) | SEION | Full8loom; SEION | Full8loom | 3:46 |
| 12. | "Go Together" (놓지 않기로 해) (Jae Hyun, Ji Beom, Bo Min) | CODE 9; PURAVIDA | CODE 9; PURAVIDA | CODE 9 | 3:58 |
| Total length: | | | | | 40:23 |

Without You bonus tracks
| No. | Title | Lyrics | Music | Arrangement | Length |
|---|---|---|---|---|---|
| 3. | "Without You" | BLSSD | BLSSD | BLSSD | 3:44 |
| 4. | "I Love You Crazy!" | Moon Seol-li; Jang Jun; TAG | Sean Michael Alexander; David Amber | David Amber; AVENUE 52 | 3:51 |
| Total length: | | | | | 47:58 |

== Charts ==
=== Re-boot ===
==== Weekly charts ====
| Chart | Peak position |
|---|---|
| South Korean Albums (Gaon) | 8 |

==== Monthly charts ====
| Chart | Peak position |
|---|---|
| South Korean Albums (Gaon) | 22 |

=== Without You ===
==== Weekly charts ====
| Chart | Peak position |
|---|---|
| South Korean Albums (Gaon) | 4 |

==== Monthly chart ====
| Chart | Peak position |
|---|---|
| South Korean Albums (Gaon) | 15 |

== Accolades ==
=== Music program awards ===
| Song | Program | Date | Ref. |
|---|---|---|---|
| "Wannabe" | M Countdown (Mnet) | December 26, 2019 | |
