= Ahn Se-ha =

South Korean actor (born 1986)

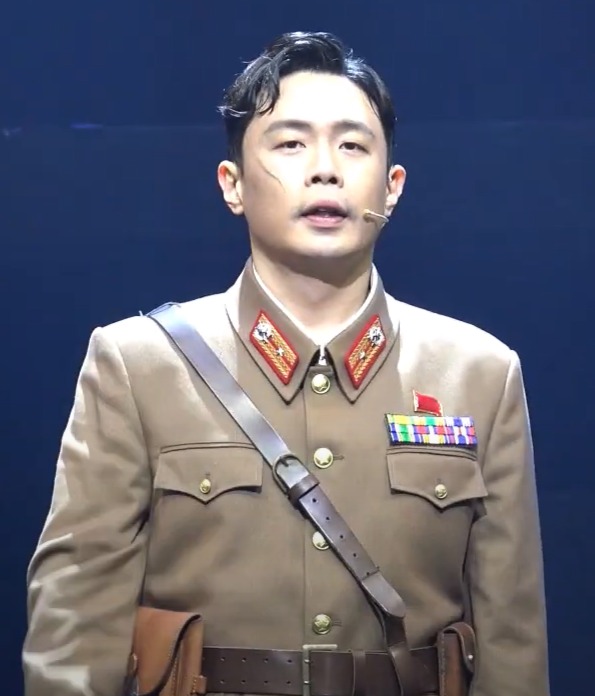
- Ahn in 2022
- Born: Ahn Jae-wook; January 29, 1986 (age 40); Changwon, South Gyeongsang Province, South Korea
- Education: Kyungnam University – Bachelor of Business Administration
- Occupation: Actor
- Years active: 2011–present
- Agent: Hunus Entertainment
- Spouse: Unknown (m. 2017)
- Children: 2

Korean name
- Hangul: 안재욱
- RR: An Jaeuk
- MR: An Chaeuk

Stage name
- Hangul: 안세하
- RR: An Seha
- MR: An Seha

Ahn Se-ha (Korean: 안세하; born Ahn Jae-wook on January 29, 1986) is a South Korean actor.

== Personal life ==
On April 6, 2017, Just Entertainment revealed that Ahn was set to marry his girlfriend of over a year. The prospective bride is his classmate from college and an ordinary citizen of the same age. The wedding ceremony was held in Apgujeong, Gangnam, Seoul on May 14, 2017. They have two daughters.

== Filmography ==
=== Television series ===
Year	Title	Role	Notes	Ref.
2013	She Is Wow	Jo Sang-byung		
2013	Two Weeks	Go Man-seok		
2013	Marry Him If You Dare	Lee Jae-soo		
2014	God's Gift: 14 Days	Na Ho-gook		
2014	You're All Surrounded	Lee Young-goo	Cameo, episode 5-6	
2014	Temptation	Park Han-soo		
2014	My Lovely Girl	Detective agency staff	Cameo	
2014	A Mother's Choice	Player 1		
2015	The Producers	Manager		
2015	Last	Gong Young-chil		
2015	Yong-pal	Man-sik		
2015	She Was Pretty	Kim Poong-ho		
2015	High-End Crush			
2016	The Vampire Detective	Detective Park		
2016	W	Kim Poong-ho	Cameo, episode 6	
2016	Love in the Moonlight	Jung Deok-ho		
2017	Queen of Mystery		Cameo	
2017	The King in Love	Gae-won		
2017	Children of the 20th Century	Jung Woo-sung		
2017	I'm Not a Robot	Military Doctor	Cameo, episode 1	
2018	Voice 2	Kwak Dok-ki		
2018	Devilish Charm	Myung Seok-hwan	Cameo	
2018	100 Days My Prince	Heo Man-shik	Cameo, episode 5 and 7	
2019	Spring Turns to Spring	Heo Bom-sam		
2019	Abyss	Cha Min	Cameo, episode 1	
2019	Voice 3	Kwak Dok-ki	Cameo, episodes 2–3	
2019	Flower Crew: Joseon Marriage Agency	Peddler	Cameo, episode 1	
2019–2020	Queen: Love and War	Eunuch Hwang		
2020	SF8	Gu Sung-tae	Episode: "Love Virtually"	
2020	Live On	Literature Teacher	Cameo, episode 1	
2021	She Would Never Know	Kwon Sung-yeon		
2021	Nevertheless	Chef		
2021	Dali & Cocky Prince	Han Byung-se		
2021	Idol: The Coup	Yoon Se-yeol		
2023	The Heavenly Idol	Wild Animal's ex-manager	Cameo, episode 1	
2023	King the Land	Noh Sang-sik		
2023	My Demon	Seok-In		

=== Film ===
Year	Title	Role	Notes/Ref.
2013	Hope	Cocomong Alpha 1	
2013	Queen of the Night	Byung-jang	
2015	Makgeolli Girls	Dae-goo	
2015	The Lost Choices	Noh Chang-bae	
2015	Goodnight Mr. Lee		
2016	El Condor Pasa	Sang-geun	
2016	Will You Be There?	young Tae-ho	
2017	One Line	Detective Cheon	
2017	The Swindlers	Chief Kim	
2018	Herstory	Taxi driver 3	Special appearance
2019	No Mercy	Loan company employee	Cameo

=== Variety shows ===
Year	Title	Notes	Ref.
2016	Law of the Jungle in Panama	Cast member (episodes 195–199)	
2016	King of Mask Singer	Contestant as "Search For Mom Cheori" (episodes 43–44)	

== Stage ==
=== Musical ===
Musical play performances
Year	Title		Role	Theater	Date	Ref.
Year	English	Korean	Role	Theater	Date	Ref.
2012	Pit-a-Pat	두근두근	Multi-Man	Noeul Small Theater	February 3, 2012 - March 31, 2012	
2016	All Shook Up	올 슉업	Dennis	Hongik University Daehangno Art Center Grand Theater	June 17, 2016 - August 28, 2016	
2014–2015	All Shook Up	올 슉업	Dennis	Hongik University Daehangno Art Center Grand Theater	November 28, 2014 - February 1, 2015	
2021	1976 Harlan County	1976 할란카운티	Riley	Chungmu Arts Center Grand Theater	May 28, 2021 - July 4, 2021	
2022	Crash Landing on You	사랑의 불시착	Jo Cheol-gang	COEX Shinhan Card Artium	September 16, 2022 - November 13, 2022	
2023	Harlan County	할란카운티	Riley	KEPCO Arts Center	May 16, 2023 - July 16, 2023	
2024	A Gentleman's Guide to Love and Murder	젠틀맨스 가이드	Dysquith	Kwanglim Arts Center BBCH Hall	July 6 to October 20	

=== Theater ===
Theater play performances
Year	Title		Role	Theater	Date	Ref.
Year	English	Korean	Role	Theater	Date	Ref.
2011	New Boing Boing One Shot	뉴보잉보잉 1탄	Soon-seong	Bupyeong Arts Center Haenuri Theater Incheon	October 20, 2011 - October 22, 2011	
2011	I Would Like to See	보고싶습니다	Heulraengi	Shin Yeon Art Hall (A Art Hall)	November 5, 2011 - January 8, 2012	
2011	New Boing Boing One Shot	뉴보잉보잉 1탄	Soon-seong	Mapo Arts Center Art Hall Mac	December 21, 2011 - January 8, 2012	
2013	I Miss You	보고싶다	Heulraengi	Semyung University Minsong Art Hall 1	January 5, 2013 - January 31, 2013	
2013	Scent of Love	국화꽃향기	Lee	Art Tree Theater	April 9, 2013 - May 31, 2013	
2017	Special Liar	스페셜 라이어	Stanley Gardner	Dongsoo Art Center Dongsoong Hall	May 23, 2017 - July 30, 2017	
2017	Special Liar	스페셜 라이어	Stanley Gardner	Cheonan City Hall Bongseohall	August 4, 2017 - August 5, 2017	
2017	Special Liar	스페셜 라이어	Stanley Gardner	Sogang Theater Shinhan Card Hall, Busan	August 12, 2017 - August 13, 2017	
2017	Special Liar	스페셜 라이어	Stanley Gardner	Gwangju Arts Center Grand Theater	August 19, 2017 - August 20, 2017	
2017	Special Liar	스페셜 라이어	Stanley Gardner	Daegu Suseong Art Pia Yongji Hall	August 25, 2017 - August 27, 2017	
2017	Special Liar	스페셜 라이어	Stanley Gardner	Changwon Seongsan Art Hall Grand Theater	September 9, 2017 - September 10, 2017	
2017	Special Liar	스페셜 라이어	Stanley Gardner	Incheon Culture & Arts Center	September 15, 2017 - September 16, 2017	

== Awards and nominations ==
Year	Award	Category	Nominated work	Result
2015	MBC Drama Awards	Best Supporting Actor in a Miniseries	She Was Pretty	Nominated
2017	MBC Drama Awards	Golden Acting Award, Actor in a Monday-Tuesday Drama	Children of the 20th Century	Nominated
2023	Korea Drama Awards	Best Supporting Actor	King the Land	Won
