= Yes. (EP) =

- Digital cover

EP by Golden Child
- Released: January 25, 2021
- Recorded: 2020
- Length: K-pop; reggaeton
- Language: Korean
- Label: Woollim; Kakao M
- Producer: SCORE (13); Megatone (13); Door; MosPick; 1Take; TAK; Lim Su-ho; Woong Kim; N!ko; Zaydro

Golden Child chronology
Pump It Up (2020)	Yes. (2021)	Game Changer (2021)

Singles from Yes.
- 1. "Burn It" Released: January 25, 2021

Music video
- "Burn It" on YouTube "Breathe" on YouTube

Yes. is the fifth extended play (EP) album by South Korean boy band Golden Child. It was released on January 25, 2021, through Woollim Entertainment and distributed by Kakao M. It contains six songs, including its lead single "Burn It".

== Background and release ==
On January 1, 2021, Woollim Entertainment released two teaser photos and a teaser video announcing their return with their fifth EP on January 25. On January 4, they released the concept photos and the concept trailer of Choi Bo-min, also revealing Yes. as the name of the EP. They continued to release the individual concept photos and the concept trailer of other members one by one until January 13. On January 14, the group concept photo was released. On January 18, the first music video teaser for the lead single, which later revealed to be "Burn It", was released. On January 19–20, the tracklist and the preview for the EP was released, respectively. On January 21, the second music video teaser for "Burn It" was released. On January 25, Yes. was released along with the music video for "Burn It".

== Track listing ==
No.	Title	Lyrics	Music	Arrangement	Length
1.	"Yes."		SCORE (13); Megatone (13)	SCORE (13); Megatone (13)	1:27
2.	"Burn It" (안아줄게; An-ajulge [lit. "I'll Hug You"])	SCORE (13); Megatone (13); Door; J Rise; Jangjun; TAG	SCORE (13); Megatone (13); Door	SCORE (13); Megatone (13)	3:29
3.	"Cool Cool"	MosPick; Jangjun; TAG	MosPick	MosPick	3:18
4.	"Round n Round" (기다리고 있어; Gidaligo iss-eo [lit. "I'm Waiting for You"])	1Take; TAK; Jangjun; TAG	1Take; TAK	1Take; TAK	3:39
5.	"Milky Way"	Lim Su-ho; Woong Kim; N!ko; Moon Dae-jin	Lim Su-ho; Woong Kim; N!ko	N!ko	3:36
6.	"Breathe"	Zaydro (CODE 9); Jangjun; TAG	Zaydro (CODE 9)	Zaydro (CODE 9)	3:24
Total length:					18:56

== Charts ==
=== Weekly charts ===
Weekly chart performance for Yes.
Chart (2021)	Peak position
Japanese Albums (Oricon)	42
South Korean Albums (Gaon)	2

=== Monthly charts ===
Monthly chart performance for Yes.
Chart (2021)	Peak position
South Korean Albums (Gaon)	9

=== Year-end charts ===
Year-end chart performance for Yes.
Chart (2021)	Position
South Korean Albums (Gaon)	94

== Accolades ==
=== Music program awards ===
Song	Program	Date	Ref.
"Burn It"	The Show (SBS MTV)	February 2, 2021	
"Burn It"	Show Champion (MBC M)	February 3, 2021	
