= Our Love Story =

- Theatrical poster
- Hangul: 연애담
- Hanja: 戀愛談
- RR: Yeonaedam
- MR: Yŏnaedam
- Directed by: Lee Hyun-ju
- Written by: Lee Hyun-ju
- Produced by: Kim Bo-ra; Kim Tae-kyun; Lee Ji-seung; Lim Charn-sang; Park Heon-soo
- Starring: Lee Sang-hee; Ryu Sun-young
- Cinematography: Kwon Yong-jik
- Edited by: Lee Hyun-ju
- Music by: Choi Yong-rak
- Production company: Korean Academy of Film Arts
- Distributed by: Indie Plug
- Release dates: May 1, 2016 (JIFF); November 17, 2016 (South Korea)
- Running time: 99 minutes
- Country: South Korea
- Language: Korean
- Box office: US$176,403

Our Love Story (Korean: 연애담; RR: Yeonaedam) is a 2016 South Korean romantic drama film written and directed by Lee Hyun-ju, starring Lee Sang-hee and Ryu Sun-young.

== Plot ==
Yoon-ju, an awkward and shy fine arts student, meets the eccentric bartender Ji-soo while searching for materials for a project installation. Though she had previously been in relationships with men, Yoon-ju finds herself falling for Ji-soo's charms and cautiously follows her desires.

== Cast ==
- Lee Sang-hee as Yoon-ju
- Ryu Sun-young as Ji-soo
- Park Keun-rok as Young-ho
- Im Sung-mi as Young-eun
- Kim Jong-su as Ji-soo's father
- Lee Ji-soo as Professor
- Park Joo-hwan as Byeong-gi
- Lee Da-yeong as Se-ah
- Han Geun-sup as Young-eun's boyfriend
- Jeong A-mi as Ji-soo's mother
- Kim Gi-beom as Bar boss

== Awards and nominations ==
Awards	Category	Recipient	Result	Ref.
53rd Baeksang Arts Awards	Best New Actress	Lee Sang-hee	Won	
53rd Baeksang Arts Awards	Best New Director	Lee Hyun-ju	Nominated	
26th Buil Film Awards	Best New Actress	Lee Sang-hee	Nominated	
26th Buil Film Awards	Best New Director	Lee Hyun-ju	Won	
22nd Chunsa Film Awards	Best New Actress	Lee Sang-hee	Won	
22nd Chunsa Film Awards	Best New Director	Lee Hyun-ju	Nominated	
6th Marie Claire Film Festival	Marie Claire Award	Lee Hyun-ju	Won	
4th Wildflower Film Awards	Best Actress	Lee Sang-hee	Nominated	
4th Wildflower Film Awards	Best Actress	Ryu Sun-young	Nominated	
4th Wildflower Film Awards	Best New Director (narrative films)	Lee Hyun-ju	Nominated	
4th Wildflower Film Awards	Best New Actor/Actress	Lee Sang-hee	Won	
38th Blue Dragon Film Awards	Best New Actress	Lee Sang-hee	Nominated	
38th Blue Dragon Film Awards	Best New Director	Lee Hyun-ju	Won	
