= All of Us Are Dead =

2022 South Korean horror television series

- Promotional poster
- Hangul: 지금 우리 학교는
- Hanja: 只今 우리 學校는
- Lit.: Now at Our School
- RR: Jigeum uri hakgyoneun
- MR: Chigŭm uri hakkyonŭn
- Genre: Coming-of-age; Horror; Zombie apocalypse; Apocalyptic; Survival
- Created by: Chun Sung-il; Lee Jae-kyoo; Kim Nam-su
- Based on: All of Us Are Dead by Joo Dong-geun
- Written by: Chun Sung-il
- Directed by: Lee Jae-kyoo; Kim Nam-su
- Starring: Park Ji-hu; Yoon Chan-young; Cho Yi-hyun; Lomon; Yoo In-soo; Lee Yoo-mi; Kim Byung-chul; Lee Kyu-hyung; Jeon Bae-soo
- Composer: Mowg
- Country of origin: South Korea
- Original language: Korean
- No. of seasons: 1
- No. of episodes: 12

Production
- Cinematography: Park Se-seung
- Editor: Shin Min-kyung
- Camera setup: Multi-camera
- Running time: 53–71 minutes
- Production companies: Film Monster by JTBC Studios; Kim Jong-hak Production

Original release
- Network: Netflix
- Release: January 28, 2022 – present

All of Us Are Dead (Korean: 지금 우리 학교는) is a South Korean coming-of-age apocalyptic horror television series based on the webtoon of the same name by Joo Dong-geun, which was published on Webtoon between 2009 and 2011. It stars Park Ji-hu, Yoon Chan-young, Cho Yi-hyun, Lomon, Yoo In-soo, Lee Yoo-mi, Kim Byung-chul, Lee Kyu-hyung, and Jeon Bae-soo. The series mainly follows a class of South Korean students and their struggles while surviving against a highly-contagious zombie virus.

The show was released on January 28, 2022, on Netflix. Following its release, it was watched over 474.26 million hours in its first 30 days on the service. The show was renewed for a second season on June 6, 2022, and principal photography commenced on July 23, 2025.

== Premise ==
A deadly zombie virus rapidly spreads through a South Korean high school and then to the nearby city of Hyosan. Isolated and without contact with the outside world, where government authorities struggle to contain the outbreak, several students must fight for survival and find a way to reach safety.

In the second season, after surviving the Hyosan zombie virus, Nam On-jo is a university student in Seoul struggling to adapt to her new life. A new outbreak of the virus soon forces her and several new friends to fight for survival once again.

== Cast and characters ==
=== Main ===
- Park Ji-hu as Nam On-jo: A student of Class 2–5, she is Cheong-san's love interest, childhood friend, and neighbor.
- Yoon Chan-young as Lee Cheong-san: A student of Class 2–5, he is On-jo's childhood friend and neighbor.
- Cho Yi-hyun as Choi Nam-ra: The class president of Class 2–5, and Su-hyeok's love interest.
- Lomon as Lee "Bare-su" Su-hyeok: A student of Class 2–5 who is a former delinquent/bully and Nam-ra's love interest.
- Yoo In-soo as Yoon Gwi-nam: A school bully who is a student from Class 2–2.
- Lee Yoo-mi as Lee Na-yeon: A wealthy and notorious student of Class 2–5.
- Kim Byung-chul as Lee Byeong-chan: A science teacher at Hyosan High and creator of the Jonas Virus. With a cell biology PhD from the US, he initially worked as a researcher at a pharmaceutical company but quit.
- Lee Kyu-hyung as Song Jae-ik: A detective of Hyosan Police Station.
- Jeon Bae-soo as Nam So-ju: Captain of 119 EMS Rescue team 1, and On-jo's father.

=== Supporting ===
==== Introduced in season 1 ====
- Im Jae-hyuk as Yang Dae-su: A student of Class 2–5 and Woo-jin's best friend.
- Kim Bo-yoon as Seo Hyo-ryung: A student of Class 2–5 and Ji-min's best friend.
- Ahn Seung-gyun as Oh Joon-yeong: The second top student of Class 2–5 and the school.
- Ham Sung-min as Han Gyeong-su: A student of Class 2–5 and Cheong-san's best friend, who comes from a low-income family.
- Kim Joo-ah as Yoon I-sak: A student of Class 2–5 and On-jo's best friend.
- Kim Jin-young as Kim Ji-min: A student of Class 2–5, Hyo-ryung's best friend, and member of the school's choir.
- Son Sang-yeon as Jang Woo-jin: A student of Class 2–5 and Ha-ri's younger brother.
- Kim Jung-yeon as Kim Min-ji: A student of Class 2–5 and Dae-su's friend.
- Ha Seung-ri as Jang Ha-ri: A final-year senior student who competes in archery, Woo-jin's elder sister.
- Lee Eun-saem as Park Mi-jin: A final–year senior student.
- Yang Han-yeol as Yoo Jun-seong: A final-year senior student and Mi-jin's friend.
- Hwang Bo-un as Lee Ha-lim: A final-year senior student and Jun-seong's friend.
- Lee Sang-hee as Park Sun-hwa: the English teacher.
- Jin Ho-eun as Jung Min-jae: A student and member of the school's archery team alongside Ha-ri.
- Oh Hye-soo as Min Eun-ji: A student of Class 2-2 and bullying victim of Gwi-nam, who later becomes a hambie (half-zombie).
- Ahn Ji-ho as Kim Cheol-soo: A junior student of Hyosan High School, bullying victim of Gwi-nam, and friend of Eun-ji.
- Jung Yi-seo as Kim Hyeon-ju: A student of Class 2–5 and a bully/bystander. She is the first human to be infected, leading to the outbreak of the Jonas Virus.
- Lee Chae-eun as Park Hee-su: A student of Class 2–5 who is pregnant.
- Lee Min-goo as Lee Jin-su: A student and Byeong-chan's son who was bullied by the main bully group. He is the first infected human and the virus was created by his father, to make him stronger.
- Oh Hee-joon as Son Myung-hwan: A student and the leader of the bullies.
- Shin Jae-hwi as Park Chang-hoon: A student and a bully who is one of the first people to be infected.
- Um Hyo-sup as the Principal: an enabler of the bullies who only cares about the reputation of Hyosan High.
- Yoon Kyung-ho as Jung Yong-nam: the strict dean.
- Yoon Byung-hee as Kang Jin-gu: the gym teacher.
- Ahn Si-ha as Kim Kyung-mi: the nurse who is one of the first people to be infected.
- Park Jae-chul as Jeon Ho-chul: An auxiliary police officer who befriends Jae-ik
- Lee Si-hoon as "Orangibberish": A live streamer.
- Ahn Se-bin as Se-bin: A child who gets rescued by Jae-ik and Ho-chul.
- Lee Ji-hyun as Cheong-san's mother: Operates a fried chicken restaurant in Hyosan, and deeply cares for her son.
- Woo Ji-hyun as Kim U-sin: A paramedic of 119 EMS Rescue team 1.
- Dong Hyun-bae as Park Young-hwan: A paramedic of 119 EMS Rescue team 1.
- Bae Hae-sun as Park Eun-hee: A member of the National Assembly representing Hyosan.
- Jo Dal-hwan as Jo Dal-ho: A senior aide.
- Ko Na-young as Jin-su's mother: Byeong-chan's wife, who later gets bitten by Jin-su.
- Kim Jong-tae as Jin Seon-moo: the commander of marital law of Hyosan.

==== Introduced in season 2 ====
- Roh Jae-won as Han Du-seok: Leader of the National Intelligence Service
- Lee Min-jae as Yong Ma-ru: On-jo's university friend
- Kim Si-eun as So Ju-ram: On-jo's university friend
- Yoon Ga-i as Lee Jong-a: On-jo's university friend
- Seo Ji-hoon
- Kim Min
- Ahn Dong-goo
- Ryu Sung-rok
- Han Hyun-jun

== Episodes ==
No.	Title	Original release date
1	"Episode 1"	January 28, 2022
In summer, a gang of bullies corner former Hyosan High student Lee Jin-su on the rooftop of a building. After they beat him up, he begins have symptoms similar to those of a zombie and tries to fight them off, but is pushed off the roof and left hospitalized. Later in the hospital, his father, Lee Byeong-chan, beats him after being attacked. Two months later, Kim Hyeon-ju, one of Jin-su's bullies, is bitten by an infected hamster in the school's science lab. Byeong-chan, the science teacher, discovers this and locks her inside the lab. She escapes the next day, though now infected and delirious, and manages to get back to her classroom, before being taken to the nurses office by her classmates and teacher Park Sun-hwa. There she bites school nurse Kim Kyung-mi, before being sedated and transported to the hospital. Police arrive at the school after being called and arrest Byeong-chan. Shortly after, during lunch, Kyung-mi turns into a zombie and attacks several students, triggering a viral outbreak within the school.
2	"Episode 2"	January 28, 2022
Childhood best friends Nam On-jo and Lee Cheong-san flee the cafeteria as zombies overrun the school. They take refuge in their classroom (Class 2-5) with other surviving classmates, including Lee Su-hyeok, Yoon I-sak, Han Gyeong-su, Lee Na-yeon, Yang Dae-su, Oh Joon-yeong, Kim Ji-min, Jang Woo-jin, Seo Hyo-ryung, Kim Min-ji, and class president Choi Nam-ra. An infected teacher enters the classroom and bites Min-ji after transforming, forcing the group to flee into the hallway, looking for another classroom to hide in. Along the way I-sak is also bitten, and, after transforming, attacks Cheong-san and On-jo, forcing Cheong-san to push her out of a window. The students fashion a fire hose into a makeshift ladder to descend to the broadcast room, where they reunite with their homeroom and english teacher, Sun-hwa. Meanwhile, school bully Yoon Gwi-nam hides in the cafeteria kitchen. Archery team members Jang Ha-ri and Jung Min-jae take refuge with upperclassmen Yoo Jun-seong and Park Mi-jin in a restroom. At the hospital, a zombified Hyeon-ju bites several others, leading to a rapid citywide infection.
3	"Episode 3"	January 28, 2022
Gyeong-su is scratched while fighting off a zombie and isolates himself in another room when Na-yeon accuses him of infection. Despite showing no initial symptoms, Na-yeon antagonizes him while pretending to apologize and tending to his scratch with her handkerchief. Gyeong-su suddenly transforms and attacks Cheong-san, throwing himself out of a window in the process. Nam-ra reveals that Na-yeon caused Gyeong-su's infection by using her handkerchief smeared with zombie blood to touch Gyeong-su's scratch. The group condemns Na-yeon, causing her to storm out into the halls, with Sun-hwa following her. Meanwhile, Gwi-nam betrays several survivors to zombies to escape the kitchen. Cheong-san's mother heads to the school to search for her son. Elsewhere, firefighter and On-jo's father, Nam So-ju, along with his crew, assemblywoman Park Eun-hee, and other government officials are trapped inside a government building. Park Hee-su, a pregnant student, gives birth in a public bathroom stall. She flees with the baby but is bitten and hides inside Cheong-san's family restaurant, tying herself out of reach from the baby as she turns. The outbreak prompts government forces, under the command of Jin Seon-moo, to declare martial law and initiate the evacuation of survivors.
4	"Episode 4"	January 28, 2022
Cheong-san's mother arrives at the school but is quickly surrounded and killed by zombies, among them the zombified Gyeong-su. Police detective Song Jae-ik interrogates Byeong-chan, who admits to creating the virus, known as the "Jonas Virus," in an attempt to empower Jin-su against his bullies. This proved ineffective, however, as Jin-su turned into a zombie and infected his mother as well. Suddenly, a horde of zombies swarms the police station. Byeong-chan, who is bitten, informs Jae-ik that his research on a cure is on his laptop in the school's science lab. He sacrifices himself to the horde, allowing Jae-ik and rookie officer Jeon Ho-chul to escape. At the school, Su-hyeok and Cheong-san retrieve a smartphone from the staff room and encounter Min Eun-ji, a school outcast who was bitten but has not turned. They are separated by zombies; Su-hyeok returns to the broadcast room while Cheong-san is forced to flee with the phone. Cheong-san hides in the principal's office, where he witnesses Gwi-nam killing the principal before fleeing again with Gwi-nam in pursuit. Meanwhile, So-ju, his surviving crew, and the government officials are evacuated.
5	"Episode 5"	January 28, 2022
Cheong-san and Gwi-nam fight atop a bookshelf in the school library. Cheong-san stabs Gwi-nam's left eye before pushing him down into a horde of zombies. He escapes into a vent and tries to call for help using the smartphone, but finds that all communications have been cut off by the government to manage the crisis. Meanwhile, Joon-yeong and On-jo retrieve a drone from the science lab to search for Cheong-san. As they pilot the drone outside, they find much of the city in ruins. Ha-ri, Min-jae, Jun-seong, and Mi-jin head to the school clinic, only to discover that all internet connections have also been severed. Jae-ik and Ho-chul take refuge in Cheong-san's family restaurant and rescue Hee-su's baby. So-ju and his group arrive at a military encampment, but military officials forbid him from leaving to search for On-jo. Gwi-nam, having survived his injuries and retained human consciousness despite being bitten, vows revenge on Cheong-san.
6	"Episode 6"	January 28, 2022
The students broadcast music throughout the school to distract the zombies while they meet up with Cheong-san. Gwi-nam pursues them, revealing superhuman strength as he attacks Su-hyeok and bites Nam-ra, and is eventually pushed out of a window. The students retreat inside the music room. Cheong-san, who is responsible for Gwi-nam's infection, argues that Nam-ra is infected, but she remains human and does not turn. On-jo suggests that she, Gwi-nam, and Eun-ji developed a form of immunity to the virus. Unbeknownst to them, Na-yeon is hiding inside a nearby locked storage room stocked with food. At the restaurant, Jae-ik and Ho-chul rescue a young girl named Se-bin. So-ju escapes the encampment and sets off towards the school to rescue On-jo.
7	"Episode 7"	January 28, 2022
Soldier Lee Jae-joon is bitten and turns into a zombie during a clearing mission. Researchers use his infected body for examination. As Nam-ra's infection grows stronger, she begins to crave human flesh and gains acute hearing, vision and smell. She and Su-hyeok confess their feelings for each other and kiss. The students flee to the rooftop, only to find the door locked from outside by fellow student and school outcast Kim Cheol-soo. Cheol-soo knows there are students behind the door but does not open it. They fend off waves of zombies and Gwi-nam, who survived the fall. Jae-ik, Ho-chul, and the children escape the restaurant on a moped and find another survivor: a live streamer called "Orangibberish". However, Ho-chul rides off with the children when zombies approach them, leaving Jae-ik and Orangibberish behind.
8	"Episode 8"	January 28, 2022
Nam-ra's infection grants her incredible strength, allowing her to throw Gwi-nam down the stairs. Eun-ji sets the staff room on fire before wandering off, activating the fire alarm and finally unlocking the rooftop doors. The students are too late, however, as a rescue helicopter has left with only Cheol-soo. They build a distress signal sign using sticks and planks before later gathering around a campfire. Cheong-san reveals his feelings for On-jo, which upsets her. Jae-ik and Orangibberish are rescued by Ho-chul, who returns with a bus and the two children. They are found and evacuated by the military, who also evacuate Eun-ji. Flashbacks reveal that Sun-hwa was bit while saving Na-yeon, who now seeks to atone for her actions. She stocks up on food to give to the group and makes her way to the rooftop, but is found and killed by Gwi-nam, who plots another attack on the students.
9	"Episode 9"	January 28, 2022
Gwi-nam climbs to the rooftop and attacks the students, but Nam-ra's strength allows her to overpower him once more, pushing him off the roof. Jae-ik reveals to the military that Byeong-chan's laptop, believed to contain the cure, is located at the school. A dispatch team goes to retrieve the laptop and prepares to rescue the students. However, Eun-ji goes berserk at the encampment and bites Cheol-soo. She is promptly captured and examined, resulting in sudden orders to classify all survivors as asymptomatic; ergo, the dispatch team is forced to abandon the students, much to the students' dismay. A loud thunderstorm ensues, hampering the zombies' ability to hear and smell. Both surviving groups at the school decide to use this advantage for another escape. The rooftop group makes their way to the ground floor, where a horrified Cheong-san finds his zombified mother.
10	"Episode 10"	January 28, 2022
Cheong-san's cries attract the attention of nearby zombies, forcing the students to flee. Ji-min is separated from the group and is quickly killed. The students join Ha-ri's group at the gym but soon find themselves surrounded by zombies. Min-jae flees outside; Jun-seong sacrifices himself to allow everyone to hide inside the equipment room. The following morning, Cheong-san and On-jo reconcile and promise to discuss their relationship when they reach safety. The students use metal carts to form a mobile barricade to safely reach the gym's back exit. However, Joon-yeong's hand is bitten through a gap in the barricade, and he climbs over it to fend off the zombies before turning. So-ju, finally arriving at the school, comes to their rescue. Meanwhile, researchers deduce that the virus' adaptability and the irreversible state of its victims make a cure impossible. Seon-moo authorizes the bombing of Hyosan.
11	"Episode 11"	January 28, 2022
Escaping the gym, On-jo finally reunites with her father, but the group is forced to flee again from approaching zombies. So-ju diverts the zombies away, sacrificing himself to allow the students to reach a nearby construction site, where they take cover on a scaffold. Gwi-nam presses Min-jae about the group's whereabouts before biting him and leaving him to turn. The military deploys sound-emitting drones to draw zombies from all over the city to select bombing locations, including Hyosan High. As the students attempt another escape, they are ambushed by Gwi-nam, who bites Cheong-san's arm. Cheong-san pushes him off the scaffolding, and knowing he will inevitably turn, kisses and embraces On-jo before rushing away to distract the zombies, allowing the others to escape the school safely. He is attacked by Gwi-nam, and the two fight in a final showdown, culminating in Gwi-nam gouging Cheong-san's left eye to fulfill his revenge. The bombs are dropped, wiping out thousands of zombies; amidst the explosions, Cheong-san and Gwi-nam are seemingly killed. Seon-moo commits suicide out of regret for authorizing the bombings.
12	"Episode 12"	January 28, 2022
On-jo mourns her father and Cheong-san's deaths. The students reach an evacuated neighborhood, where they fight off a horde of zombies that evaded the bombings. Woo-jin is bitten while saving Ha-ri, forcing Nam-ra to kill him after he turns. As they flee, Nam-ra's cravings for human flesh become uncontrollable, and she nearly bites On-jo. Fearing her own impulses, she strays from the group and disappears. The surviving students—On-jo, Su-hyeok, Dae-su, Hyo-ryung, Mi-jin, and Ha-ri—arrive at a military checkpoint and are finally rescued. Three and a half months later, the government lifts martial law in Hyosan but maintains quarantine measures for the survivors in an encampment. Noticing a campfire on the school rooftop from afar, the group sneaks out to investigate. They joyfully reunite with Nam-ra, who appears surprisingly well. She reveals that there are other half-zombie survivors like herself, before leaping off the roof to join them.

== Production ==
=== Season 1 ===
On April 12, 2020, Netflix announced through a press release that JTBC Studios and Film Monster would produce a series called All of Us Are Dead based on the popular webtoon Now at Our School. On April 19, 2020, Yoon Chan-young was confirmed to star in the series as one of the students. Park Ji-hu joined the main cast on April 22. On July 1, they were officially joined by Cho Yi-hyun, Lomon and Yoo In-soo. In selecting the cast, director Lee Jae-kyoo said, "I thought that bringing on actors who were great at acting but still unknown to the public would add to the immersion of the series".

Production was temporarily suspended in August 2020 due to the re-spreading of COVID-19 pandemic in South Korea.

=== Season 2 ===
In April 2024, Park Chul-soo, the CEO of Film Monster, announced that the filming period was scheduled for 2024 and the premiere of the second season is set to take place in the second half of 2025. Netflix decided to postpone the filming schedule to 2025 for better production environment and high quality completeness. In June 2025, it was announced that the cast of the second season had been joined by Roh Jae-won, Lee Min-jae, Kim Si-eun, Seo Ji-hoon, Yoon Ga-i, Kim Min, Ahn Dong-goo and Ryu Sung-rok. Principal photography commenced on July 23, 2025, and wrapped on February 18, 2026.

== Reception ==
On the review aggregator website Rotten Tomatoes, 89% of 27 critics' reviews are positive, with an average rating of 7/10. The website's consensus reads: "While All of Us Are Dead loses some of its bite with an overlong season, its emotional grounding puts plenty of meat on the bone." Metacritic, which uses a weighted average, assigned the season a score of 67 out of 100, based on 5 critics, indicating "generally favorable" reviews.

IGN rated the series a 7 out of 10 and noted that the series was "clever, thrilling, and also... a bit exhausting." Variety praised the series, stating it "makes the most out of its nightmarish central location to otherworldly, dizzying effect."

== Accolades ==
=== Awards and nominations ===
Year	Award	Category	Recipient(s)	Result	Ref.
2022	8th APAN Star Awards	Excellence Award, Actress in an OTT Drama	Lee Yoo-mi	Nominated	
2022	8th APAN Star Awards	Best New Actor	Yoon Chan-young	Won	
2022	8th APAN Star Awards	Best New Actress	Park Ji-hu	Won	
2022	8th APAN Star Awards	Best New Actress	Cho Yi-hyun	Nominated	
2022	58th Baeksang Arts Awards	Best New Actor – Television	Yoo In-soo	Nominated	
2022	58th Baeksang Arts Awards	Best New Actress – Television	Lee Yoo-mi	Nominated	
2022	58th Baeksang Arts Awards	Best New Actress – Television	Cho Yi-hyun	Nominated	
2022	1st Blue Dragon Series Awards	Best New Actress	Park Ji-hu	Nominated	
2022	1st Blue Dragon Series Awards	Best New Actress	Cho Yi-hyun	Nominated	

=== Listicles ===
Name of publisher, year listed, name of listicle, and placement
Publisher	Year	Listicle	Placement	Ref.
Entertainment Weekly	2025	The 21 best Korean shows on Netflix to watch now	Top 21	
