= Oh Hye-soo =

South Korean actress (born 1995)

- 오혜수
- Born: 30 May 1995 (age 31); Gimpo, South Korea
- Education: Korea National University of Arts - Theater
- Occupation: Actress
- Years active: 2017–present
- Agent: Studio Santa Claus Entertainment
- Children: 1

Oh Hye-soo (born May 30, 1995) is a South Korean actress. Her notable role was school bullying victim Min Eun-ji from All of Us Are Dead (2022).

== Personal life and career ==
Oh Hye-soo was a student of Korea National University of Arts and she majored in theater. She was also a promising savate boxing athlete in Gyeonggi Province during her younger years.

She made her acting debut in the 2017 web-drama Seventeen, and later earned roles in web series Flower-like Ending in 2018 and in 2019 Cat Bartender and The Story of Yohan Kim.

Oh gained attention for her portrayal of school bullying victim Min Eun-ji from All of Us Are Dead in 2022. She made her cameo appearance in Extraordinary Attorney Woo as Shin Hye-young, an intellectually disabled rape victim.

Oh is married and has a child.

== Filmography ==
=== Television series ===
Year	Title	Role	Notes	Ref.
2022	All of Us Are Dead	Min Eun-ji		
2022	Extraordinary Attorney Woo	Shin Hye-young	Cameo (episode 10)	
