= Kim Hak-sun (actor) =

South Korean television and film actor

- Born: December 24, 1970 (age 55); South Korea
- Other name: Kim Hak-seon
- Occupations: Actor; Theater actor
- Years active: 2000–present
- Agent: Starweave Entertainment
- Spouse: Kim Jung-young

Korean name
- Hangul: 김학선
- RR: Gim Hakseon
- MR: Kim Haksŏn

Kim Hak-sun (Korean: 김학선; born on 24 December 1970) is a South Korean actor. He made his acting debut in 2000 in theaters, since then, he has appeared in number of plays, films and television series. He got recognition for his supporting roles in Fight for My Way (2017), Black Dog: Being A Teacher (2019), Do You Like Brahms? (2020), Voice (2021) and Crazy Love (2022). He has acted in films such as: Vanishing Time: A Boy Who Returned (2016), Winter's Night (2018), Juror 8 (2019) among others.

== Career ==
Kim Hak-sun is affiliated to artist management company Star Weave Entertainment since February 2022, which has acquired Entertainment O, to which he was originally affiliated.

After his compulsory military service, Kim Hak-sun joined a pungmul troupe as a manager. Later he attended the Performing Arts Academy and began to perform as an actor with Yeonwoo Theater. He debuted in 2002 in films with a role in Hong Sang-soo’s On the Occasion of Remembering the Turning Gate, and appeared in The Magicians (2005). He got recognition by playing roles in A Million (2009), Juror 8 (2019), Moonlit Winter (2019) and #ALIVE (2020). He has also appeared in TV series such as Signal (2016), Fight for My Way (2017), Something in the Rain (2018) and in the second season of Stranger (2020). He also did some roles alongside his actress wife Kim Jung-young in Merry Christmas Mr. Mo and Oh! My Gran, and as a couple in TV series Heard It Through the Grapevine (2015).

== Filmography ==
=== Films ===
Year	Title	Role	Notes	Ref.
2002	On the Occasion of Remembering the Turning Gate			
2005	You Are My Sunshine	Motel beating man		
2005	Les Formidables			
2006	The Host	Mr. Kim, civilian worker in military		
2007	Shadows in the Palace	King		
2007	Bank Attack	Detective		
2009	A Million	Ha Seung-ho		
2011	Sorry, Thank You	Real estate agent		
2014	Gyeongju	Kim Chang-hee		
2014	Entangled	Seok-joo		
2015	Memories of the Sword	Aristocrat 2		
2015	Love and .....	Director		
2016	Vanishing Time: A Boy Who Returned	Section chief Park		
2017	Another Way	Real estate agent		
2017	A Single Rider			
2017	The Mayor	Postman		
2017	Merry Christmas Mr. Mo	Yong-ho		
2018	I Have a Date with Spring	Jeon Eui-moo		
2018	The Witness	Team leader		
2019	Innocent Witness	First instance court presiding judge		
2019	Juror 8	Forensic doctor		
2019	Moonlit Winter	Yong-ho		
2019	Oh! My Gran	Young Moon-hee		
2019	Winter's Night	Taxi driver		
2020	#ALIVE	Joon-woo's father		
2021	Dongbaek	Employee of town office		
2025	The Journey to Gyeongju	Mu-il		

=== Television series ===
Year	Title	Role	Notes	Ref.
2012	How Long I've Kissed			
2014	Three Days	Kim Hyo-sun		
2015	Heard It Through the Grapevine	Butler Park		
2015	Six Flying Dragons			
2016	Signal	Jung-soon		
2016	Mrs. Cop 2			
2016	Dear My Friends			
2017	Fight for My Way	Baek Jang-soo		
2017	Live Up to Your Name			
2017	Hello, My Twenties!	Jo-eun's father		
2017	Jugglers			
2018	Something in the Rain			
2018	Suits			
2018	Your House Helper			
2019	Legal High			
2019	He Is Psychometric	Cathedral priest		
2019	Beautiful World	Sin Dae-gil		
2019	One Spring Night	Go Sook-hee		
2019	When the Devil Calls Your Name			
2019	The Lies Within	Kang Man-soo		
2019	Black Dog: Being A Teacher	Yeo Se-chang		
2020	The Game: Towards Zero	Seo Dong-cheol		
2020	My Holo Love			
2020	The Cursed	Director of Joong-Ang Ilbo		
2020	Stranger	Oh Joo-seon	Season 2	
2020	Do You Like Brahms?	Song-ah's father		
2021	Voice	Yeom Byeong-cheol		
2022	Crazy Love	Lee Yong-goo		
2022	The Empire	Hong Nan-hee's father	Cameo	
2023	Delightfully Deceitful	Han Jae-suk		

=== Theater ===
Year	Title	Role	Notes/Ref.
2005	Ask the Blind Father for Directions	Father Lee Chul-shik	
2006	Her Spring	Production	
