= High School Return of a Gangster =

2024 South Korean television series

- Promotional poster
- Hangul: 조폭인 내가 고등학생이 되었습니다
- Lit.: I a Gangster Became a High Schooler
- RR: Jopogin naega godeunghaksaengi doeeotseumnida
- MR: Chop'ogin naega kodŭnghaksaengi toeŏssŭmnida
- Genre: Fantasy; Teen drama; Action; Revenge
- Based on: I, A Gangster, Became a High Schooler by Horol
- Written by: Jeong Da-hee
- Directed by: Lee Seong-taek
- Starring: Yoon Chan-young; Bong Jae-hyun; Lee Seo-jin
- Music by: Im Seung-yong
- Opening theme: "Go" by Lucy
- Country of origin: South Korea
- Original language: Korean
- No. of episodes: 8

Production
- Executive producer: Bang Gwang-joon
- Producer: Kim Mi-na
- Cinematography: Lee Young-jin; Jeon Byung-moon
- Editor: Lee Soo-yong
- Production company: Number Three Pictures

Original release
- Network: Lifetime
- Release: May 29 – June 19, 2024

High School Return of a Gangster (Korean: 조폭인 내가 고등학생이 되었습니다) is a 2024 South Korean fantasy teen action television series starring Yoon Chan-young, Bong Jae-hyun and Lee Seo-jin. Based on the manhwa of the same Korean title by Horol. It was aired on Lifetime from May 29 to June 19, 2024, every Wednesday at 14:00 (KST). It is also available for streaming on TVING, Wavve and Watcha in South Korea, and on Viu in selected regions. The first two episodes premiered at CGV Theater and were released on February 22, 2024.

High School Return of a Gangster was the top viewed drama on Viu in Thailand and Indonesia during its release.

== Cast and characters ==
=== Main ===
- Yoon Chan-young as Song Yi-heon/Kim Deuk-pal
  1. Song Yi-heon: A 19-year-old high school student who suffered from bullying and decided to end his life. He is the illegitimate son of Chairman Bae, owner of one of the largest construction companies.
  2. Kim Deuk-pal: A 47-year-old gangster of the Chilsung Gang who dreams of studying and joining high school, as he wasn't able to study due to his poor background. One day, his soul enters the body of Song Yi-heon when he tries to stop the boy from committing suicide. Unable to escape the body of the young student, he finds out that the real Song Yi-heon was severely bullied, which caused him to commit suicide. He decides to punish his bullies and help him to get into university with good grades. During the process, he befriends the school's class president and popular boy, Choi Se-kyung.
- Bong Jae-hyun as Choi Se-kyung

The school's class president and a model student who is seemingly perfect in everything, but harbors a secret. He later develops a special friendship with Song Yi-heon.

- Lee Seo-jin as Kim Deuk-pal (special appearance)

A 47-year-old gangster whose soul enters the body of Song Yi-heon after he tries to save him. He is the respected leader of the Chilsung Gang.

=== Supporting ===
==== People around Kim Deuk-pal ====
- Won Tae-min as Kim Dong-soo

A member of the Chilsung Gang, and the right-hand man of Deuk-pal.

- Ko Dong-ok as Jong Cheol

A member of the Chilsung Gang.

- Lee Geung-young as Seo Chil-sung

The founder of the Chilsung Gang and Deuk-pal's mentor.

==== People around Song Yi-heon ====
- Hwang Bo-ra as Lee Mi-kyung

The secretary of Chairman Bae, and the one who manages Yi-heon's household.

- Lee Hee-jin as Song Min-seo

The mother of Yi-heon who raises him alone and was a former teen star.

==== People around Choi Se-kyung ====
- Seo Tae-hwa as Choi Myung-hyun

The father of Se-kyung and the Chief Prosecutor.

==== People from high school ====
- Joo Yoon-chan as Hong Jae-min

Classmate and the leader of the bullies who tormented Yi-heon, but later becomes his follower and friend.

- Lee Jeong-han as Byeong-cheol

Classmate and one of the bullies of Yi-heon.

- Jung Ji-in as Kim Ye-ji

One of the girl students who befriends Yi-heon.

== Production ==
=== Development ===
The original manhwa created by Harol was a BL story. However, the producer stated that there could be limitation on production investment and backlash for a BL content. Therefore, it's produced as a bromance-themed story instead.
