= Lee Eun-saem =

South Korean actress (born 1999)

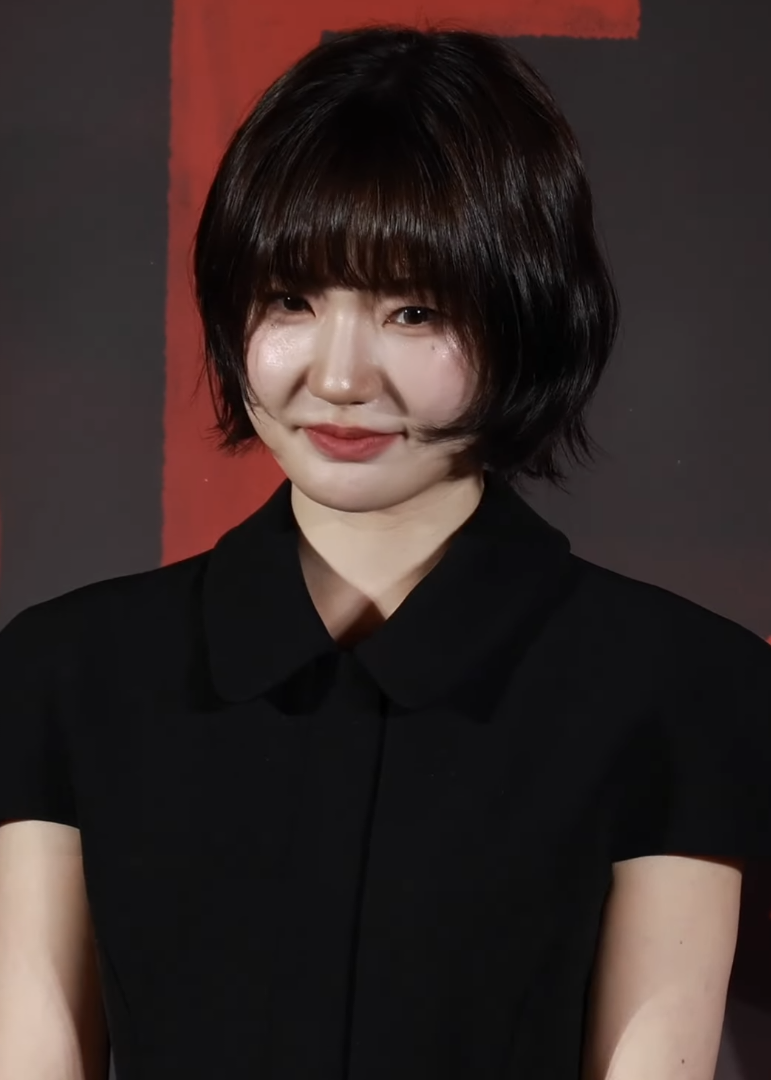
- Lee in July 2025
- Born: October 10, 1999 (age 26); Gwangju, Gyeonggi, South Korea
- Occupation: Actress
- Years active: 2007–present
- Agent: Ghost Studio

Korean name
- Hangul: 이은샘
- RR: I Eunsaem
- MR: I Ŭnsaem

Lee Eun-saem (Korean: 이은샘; born October 10, 1999) is a South Korean actress. She is known for her roles in dramas such as The Red Sleeve, The Miracle We Met, Bad Papa, Black Dog: Being A Teacher, All of Us Are Dead. She also appeared in movies Innocent Witness, Midnight Runners, The Gangster, the Cop, the Devil, and The Fault Is Not Yours.

== Filmography ==
=== Film ===
Year	Title	Role	Ref.
2009	Fly, Penguin (날아라 펭귄)	Soo-ji	
2017	Midnight Runners	Eun-sam	
2019	Innocent Witness	High School student	
2019	The Gangster, the Cop, the Devil	High School student	
2019	The Fault Is Not Yours	Mi-ran	

=== Television series ===
Year	Title	Role	Notes	Ref.
2007	Landscape in My Heart	Si-eun		
2008	Kokkiri	Park-yeon		
2008	Birth of a New Couple	Yoo-su		
2018	Bad Papa	Lee Seul-ki		
2018	Drama Stage – "Anthology"	Choi Sung-ji	Season 1; One act-drama	
2018	The Miracle We Met	Young-ju		
2018	Priest	Chae Yi-soo		
2019	Black Dog: Being A Teacher	Jin Yoo-ra		
2021	The Red Sleeve	Son Young-hee		
2022	Cheer Up	Ju Seon-ja		
2026	A Bona Fide Killer	Kwon Se-ah		

=== Web series ===
Year	Title	Role	Notes	Ref.
2017	Sweet Revenge	Lee So-eun		
2022	All of Us Are Dead	Park Mi-jin	Season 1–2	
2023–2025	Bitch × Rich	Kim Hye-in	Season 1–2	
2025	S Line	Kang Seon-ah		

== Awards and nominations ==
Name of the award ceremony, year presented, category, nominee of the award, and the result of the nomination
Award ceremony	Year	Category	Nominee / Work	Result	Ref.
Director's Cut Awards	2023	Best New Actress in Television	All of Us Are Dead	Nominated	
SBS Drama Awards	2022	Best New Actress	Cheer Up	Won	
SBS Drama Awards	2022	Best Supporting Team	Cheer Up	Won	
