= First Love (2025 TV series) =

2025 South Korean television series

- Promotional poster
- Hangul: 퍼스트 러브
- RR: Peoseuteu reobeu
- MR: P'ŏsŭt'ŭ rŏbŭ
- Genre: Coming-of-age; Romance; School drama
- Written by: Kim Yoo-jung; Ji Gang
- Directed by: Park Sun-jae
- Starring: Eunchan; Jeong Ji-soo; Cha Jun-ho; Hwang Zia; Lee Hyo-je; Lim Sung-jun; Park Sang-hoon; Kim Seon-kyoung; Han Se-jin; Sung Ji-yeon; Bong Jae-hyun; Lee Chae-eun; Park Do-ha; Chun Ye-ju
- Music by: Adora
- Country of origin: South Korea
- Original language: Korean
- No. of episodes: 6

Production
- Executive producers: Jung Jin-young; Noh Jung-hoon
- Cinematography: Lee Jae-myung
- Editor: Kim Mok-hyun
- Production company: Contents World

Original release
- Network: U+ Mobile TV
- Release: April 18 – May 23, 2025

First Love (Korean: 퍼스트 러브) is a 2025 South Korean coming-of-age romance school drama television series written by Kim Yoo-jung and Ji Gang, directed by Park Sun-jae, and starring Eunchan, Jeong Ji-soo, Cha Jun-ho, Hwang Zia, Lee Hyo-je, Lim Sung-jun, Park Sang-hoon, Kim Seon-kyoung, Han Se-jin, Sung Ji-yeon, Bong Jae-hyun, Lee Chae-eun, Park Do-ha, and Chun Ye-ju. The series follows six different stories about 18-year-old students and their first experiences with love. It was exclusively showcased at the 2024 Tokyo International Film and Content Market and released on U+ Mobile TV and U+ TV from April 18, to May 23, 2025.

== Synopsis ==
At Surim High School, a group of 18-year-old students learns what love really feels like as they deal with crushes, confusion, heartache, and the growing pains of adolescence.

== Cast and characters ==
- Eunchan as Lee Pa-ran

Leader of a popular idol group called Summer Boys, who's nickname is Blue and a heartthrob student of Surim High School. He harbors a secret admiration for his childhood friend, Bong-hee.

- Jeong Ji-soo as Choi Bong-hee

A bright and cheerful high school student who loves spending time with her friends, and Pa-ran's childhood friend.

- Cha Jun-ho as Hikari

A Japanese exchange student with a quiet, introspective nature who carries his own dreams and regrets.

- Hwang Zia as Kang Ha-na

The class president and academic achiever who serves as a guide for the exchange student Hikari.

- Lee Hyo-je as Nam Hyun-gyu

A solitary, introspective student who chooses to be alone both at home and at school. He keeps people at arms' length, but his inner world is rich with unresolved emotion.

- Lim Sung-jun as Ryu Hao

Hyun-gyu's half brother and the captain of Surim High School basketball team, who is outwardly confident but hides his own insecurities.

- Park Sang-hoon as Ha Sun-woo

A kind-hearted and genuine student whose first love is filled with the innocent excitement of new emotions.

- Kim Seon-kyoung as Lee Ji-yoon

A thoughtful and caring student who becomes entangled in Sun‑woo's world.

- Han Se-jin as Lee Philip

A dreamy, idealistic student who falls for a teacher, his affection is genuine and respectful.

- Sung Ji-yeon as Oh Ro-ra

A bright and imaginative student with a whimsical way of viewing the world.

- Bong Jae-hyun as Park Jun-young

A bold and adventurous student, where he gets caught up in a summer-night mystery at school.

- Lee Chae-eun as Kim I-na

A soft-spoken, introspective student who carries the weight of unspoken stories.

- Park Do-ha as Heo Tae-woong

A charismatic and slightly mischievous student, he brings energy and a free spirit to his relationship with Ji‑yoon.

- Chun Ye-ju as Oh Bit-na

A student who walks a fine line between confidence and uncertainty.

== Production and release ==
In March 2025, the cast lineup were confirmed and included a mix of established idols and rising actors, notably Eunchan of Tempest, Cha Jun-ho of Drippin, and Bong Jae-hyun. They are joined by other prominent names such as Park Do-ha, Hwang Zi-a, Lee Chae-eun, and Lim Sung-jun. The drama also features a highly anticipated OST, produced by Adora, the renowned composer behind hits for global acts like BTS's "Spring Day" and "Euphoria".

In November 2024, it was reported that the series would be released in February 2025. Additionally, during the showcase at the 2024 Tokyo International Film and Content Market, the cast, director, and producer introduced the production's concept, airing plans, and episode summaries. A highlight reel of the drama was also shown for the first time, receiving enthusiastic applause from the local audience.

In March 2025, the series was confirmed to be released on April 18.
