= Winter's Night =

- Directed by: Jang Woo-jin
- Screenplay by: Jang Woo-jin
- Produced by: Kim Dae-hwan
- Starring: Seo Young-hwa; Yang Heung-joo; Lee Sang-hee; Woo Ji-hyun
- Cinematography: Yang Jeong-hoon
- Edited by: Jang Woo-jin
- Release dates: May 2018 (JIFF); 17 September 2018 (South Korea)
- Running time: 98 minutes
- Country: South Korea
- Language: Korean

Winter's Night (Korean: 겨울밤에) is a 2018 South Korean drama film, written, directed and edited by Jang Woo-jin. It premiered at the 2018 Jeonju International Film Festival.

== Plot ==
Middle-aged couple, Eun-joo (Seo Young-hwa) and Heung-joo (Yang Heung-joo), takes a trip to Chuncheon in 30 years. After visiting Cheongpyeong Temple on an island, they are forced to return to the island when Eun-joo realizes she has left her phone behind. They retrace their footsteps and meet a young couple (Lee Sang-hee and Woo Ji-hyun) who reminder them of their younger self. As the night wears on, it soon reveals all is not well between Eun-joo and Heung-joo and their relationship is in crisis.

== Cast ==
- Seo Young-hwa as Eun-joo
- Yang Heung-joo as Heung-joo
- Lee Sang-hee as soldier's girlfriend
- Woo Ji-hyun as soldier
- Kim Hak-sun as Taxi driver

== Reception ==
=== Critical response ===
On the review aggregation website Rotten Tomatoes, the film holds an approval rating of 100% based on five reviews.

== Awards and nominations ==
Year	Award	Category	Recipient	Result
2018	Three Continents Festival	Special Jury Prize	Winter's Night	Won
2018	Tallinn Black Nights Film Festival	Best Director	Jang Woo-jin	Won
2018	Tallinn Black Nights Film Festival	Best Actress	Seo Young-hwa	Won
