= Bong Jae-hyun =

South Korean singer and actor (born 1999)

- 봉재현
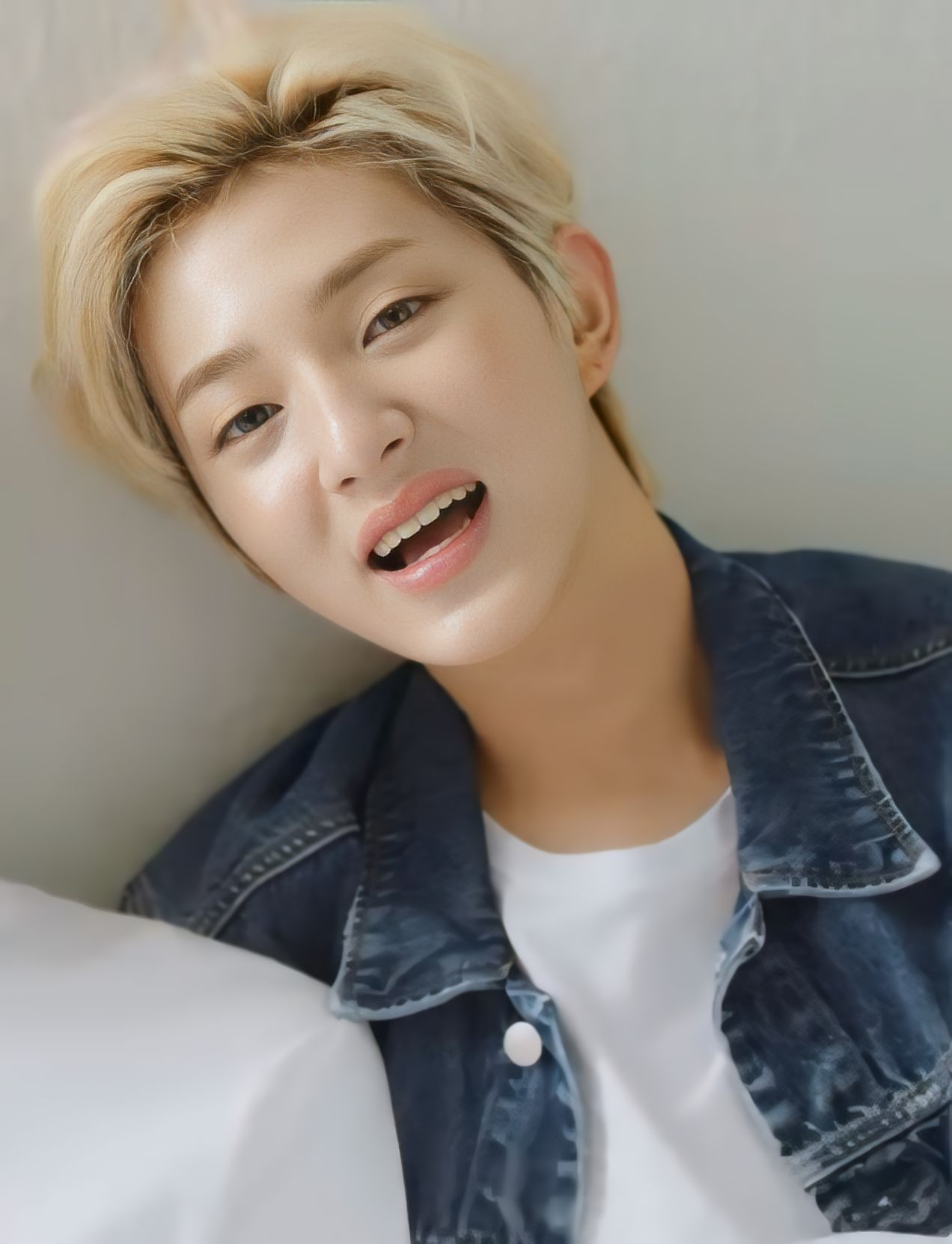
- Jaehyun in 2018.
- Born: Bong Jae-hyun; January 4, 1999 (age 27); Gangbuk District, Seoul, South Korea
- Education: Hanlim Multi Art School
- Occupations: Singer; actor
- Musical career
- Genres: K-pop
- Instrument: Vocals
- Years active: 2017–present
- Label: Woollim Entertainment
- Member of: Golden Child

Korean name
- Hangul: 봉재현
- RR: Bong Jaehyeon
- MR: Pong Chaehyŏn

Bong Jae-hyun (Korean: 봉재현; born January 4, 1999), known mononymously as Jaehyun, is a South Korean singer, actor and known for his work as a member of boy group Golden Child. As an actor, he is best known for his roles in Twinkling Watermelon (2023) and High School Return of a Gangster (2024).

== Early life ==
Jaehyun was born on January 4, 1999, Gangbuk District, Seoul, South Korea. He attended Hanlim Multi Art School.

== Career ==
=== 2017–present: Debut with Golden Child and solo activities ===
He made his debut as a member of Golden Child in the reality series Woollim Pick in 2017. Later, he officially debuted with his group release of the first EP 'Gol-Cha!' on August 28, 2017.

Jaehyun was appeared in the first episode of Dingo web drama Convenience Store Fling on January 23, 2021, marking his acting debut.

On April 6, 2023, Jaehyun was confirmed to cast members on web drama High School Return of a Gangster scheduled to premiere in 2024. Later that months, he made his screen debut in horror film Urban Myths premiered on April 27.

On August 22, 2023, Jaehyun was confirmed to cast as Eunho in the drama Twinkling Watermelon, which aired on September 25.

== Discography ==
=== Soundtrack appearances ===
Title	Year	Peak position	Album
Title	Year	KOR	Album
"I.O.T.U (I Only Think About U"	2025	—	First Love 2025 OST
"—" denotes releases that did not chart or were not released in that region.

== Filmography ==
=== Film ===
Year	Title	Role	Notes	Ref.
2015	4th Place	Unknown	Guest role	
2018	Golden Child: Miracle	Bong Jae-hyun (Himself)	Support role	
2022	Urban Myths	Young-min		

=== Television series ===
Year	Title	Role	Notes	Ref.
2022	Revenge of Others	Bang Woo-tak	(Ep. 7) (Guest Role)	
2023	Twinkling Watermelon	Ha Eun-ho		

=== Web series ===
Year	Title	Role	Ref.
2019	Crash! Insignificant Roommates	Bong Jae-hyun (Himself)	
2020	Crash! Insignificant Reunion	Bong Jae-hyun (Himself)	
2021	Convenience Store Fling	Bong Jae-hyun (Himself)	
2024	High School Return of a Gangster	Choi Se-kyung	
2025	The Villain Next Door	Cha Do Hyeon	
2025	First Love	Park Jun Yeong (Ep. 6)	

=== Variety show ===
Year	Title	Ref.
2017	Woollim pick	
