= Children of the 20th Century =

South Korean television series

- Promotional poster
- Hangul: 20세기 소년소녀
- Hanja: 20世紀 少年少女
- Lit.: 20th Century Boy and Girl
- RR: 20segi sonyeon sonyeo
- MR: 20segi sonyŏn sonyŏ
- Genre: Romance; Comedy
- Created by: Lim Hwa-min
- Written by: Lee Sun-hye
- Directed by: Lee Dong-yoon
- Starring: Han Ye-seul; Kim Ji-seok; Lee Sang-woo; Ryu Hyun-kyung; Lee Sang-hee; Ahn Se-ha; Oh Sang-jin
- Country of origin: South Korean
- Original language: Korean
- No. of episodes: 32

Production
- Executive producer: Ji Sung-bum
- Producer: Jang Jae-hoon
- Camera setup: Single camera
- Running time: 35 min
- Production company: Huayi Brothers

Original release
- Network: MBC TV
- Release: October 9 – November 28, 2017

Children of the 20th Century (Korean: 20세기 소년소녀) is a 2017 South Korean television series starring Han Ye-seul and Kim Ji-seok with Lee Sang-woo, Ryu Hyun-kyung and Lee Sang-hee. The series aired on Mondays and Tuesdays at 22:00 (KST), from October 9 to November 28, 2017.

== Synopsis ==
The story follows three women in their mid-thirties as they navigate their love lives, friendships, and familial ties.

== Cast ==
=== Main ===
- Han Ye-seul as Sa Jin-jin
  - Kang Mi-na as young Sa Jin-jin

An idol turned actress adored by many. Despite her good looks and fame, she has not dated before.

- Kim Ji-seok as Gong Ji-won
  - Kim In-seong as young Gong Ji-won

An investment banker with a Harvard MBA, and a background in Wall Street. He is innocent in love and remains loyal to his first love.

- Lee Sang-woo as Anthony / Lee Chul-min
  - Park Seo-ham as young Anthony

A former boy band member of Boys Be Ambitious, and Sa Jin-jin's crush since they were young. He is also Ji-won's stepbrother.

- Ryu Hyun-kyung as Han A-reum
  - Song Soo-hyun as young Han A-reum

A flight attendant who is constantly on a diet that takes the initiative to ask guys out.

- Lee Sang-hee as Jang Young-shim
  - Han Ji-won as young Jang Young-shim

A lawyer who has had perfect grades since she was young.

- Ahn Se-ha as Jung Woo-sung
  - Kwon Do-kyun as young Jung Woo-sung

A gynecologist. He was handsome when he was young, but his looks drastically changed after he grew older. He attended the same school as the Four Bongos.

- Oh Sang-jin as Kang Kyung-suk

A highly principled lawyer who doesn't care for money or glory. Young-shim's boss.

=== Supporting ===
==== People around Jin-jin ====
- Kim Chang-wan as Sa Chang-wan, Jin-jin's father
- Kim Mi-kyung as Kim Mi-kyung, Jin-jin's mother
- Shin Won-ho as Sa Min-ho, Jin-jin's younger brother
- Kim Jung-hwa as Sa Ho-sung / Lee Su-hyun, Jin-jin's older sister

==== Chamjin Entertainment ====
- Kim Kwang-shik as Jang Gi-bong, Jin-jin's manager
- Lee Jae-kyoon as Lee Hong-hee, Jin-jin's road manager
- Lee Yoo-mi as Mi-dal (Cho Mi-hyun), Jin-jin's stylist

==== People around Ji-won ====
- Kim Tae-hoon as Lee Seung-goo, Ji-won's step father
- Kim Young-sun as Lee Gwang-hee, Ji-won's mother
- Shin Se-hwi as Lee Ha-ram, Ji-won's half-sister
- Jung Jae-ho as Kim Tae-hyun, Ji-won's assistant

==== People around A-reum ====
- Choi Beom-ho as Han Hak-gyu, A-reum's father
- Yoon Bok-in as Yoon Bok-in, A-reum's mother
- Jang Hee-ryung as Jang Ji-hye, A-reum's colleague
- Lee Chang-yeob as Lee Dong-hoon, a co-pilot that A-reum had a crush on

==== People around Young-shim ====
- Kim Yik-tae as Jang Jang-soo, Young-shim's father
- Park Myung-shin as Kim Young-ja, Young-shim's mother

==== Others ====
- Shin Dong-mi as Choi Jung-eun, Anthony's manager
- Shin Dong-hoon as Reporter Jung
- Jo Hyun-sik as Driver

=== Special appearance ===
- Han Sun-hwa as Jung Da-young
- Golden Child as Idol group 'Master'
- Heo Ji-woong as Variety Show Host
- Shim Hyung-tak as Terius / Jung Chang-hoon
- KNK as Idol group 'Boys Be Ambitious' (young age)
- Kim So-yeon as Director

== Production ==
- The drama's working title was No Sex and the City. It is the debut of Lee Sun-hye as a main writer, as she was a junior writer for tvN's Reply series. Directing the series was Lee Dong-yoon (Fated To Love You, The Queen's Classroom, Happy Home).
- Due to a strike at MBC, the series did not air on September 25, 2017 as originally planned.

== Original soundtrack ==
=== Part 1 ===
Released on September 26, 2017
No.	Title	Lyrics	Music	Artist	Length
1.	"Ordinary Day" (보통의 날)	Banana, 17Holic, Shoulder Gangster	Shoulder Gangster	Standing Egg	03:43
2.	"Ordinary Day" (Inst.)		Shoulder Gangster		03:43
Total length:					07:26

=== Part 2 ===
Released on October 10, 2017
No.	Title	Lyrics	Music	Artist	Length
1.	"Diary" (일기)	Jinli, Glory Faces	Glory Faces, Jinli, Mingki	Gugudan	03:37
2.	"Diary" (Inst.)		Glory Faces, Jinli, Mingki		03:37
Total length:					07:14

=== Part 3 ===
Released on October 16, 2017
No.	Title	Lyrics	Music	Artist	Length
1.	"Love Letter"	March, Banana	Dino Seo	Golden Child	03:28
2.	"Love Letter" (Inst.)		Dino Seo		03:28
Total length:					06:56

=== Part 4 ===
Released on October 24, 2017
No.	Title	Lyrics	Music	Artist	Length
1.	"The Days" (그날들)	Kim Chang-gi	Kim Chang-gi	Jeon Sang-geun	04:22
2.	"The Days" (Inst.)		Kim Chang-gi		04:22
Total length:					08:44

=== Part 5 ===
Released on October 31, 2017
No.	Title	Lyrics	Music	Artist	Length
1.	"Boy and Girl" (소년, 소녀)	17HOLIC, Yoonghee, Banana	Dino Seo	Nam Tae-hyun	04:07
2.	"Boy and Girl" (Inst.)		Dino Seo		04:07
Total length:					08:14

=== Part 6 ===
Released on November 7, 2017
No.	Title	Lyrics	Music	Artist	Length
1.	"Not Too Distant Day" (아주 멀지 않은 날에)	Flight Ticket	Flight Ticket	MeloMance	03:45
2.	"Not Too Distant Day" (Inst.)		Flight Ticket		03:45
Total length:					07:30

== Ratings ==
- In the table below, the blue numbers represent the lowest ratings and the red numbers represent the highest ratings.
- NR denotes that the drama did not rank in the top 20 daily programs on that date.

Ep.	Original Broadcast Date	Title	Average Audience Share			
Ep.	Original Broadcast Date	Title	TNmS Ratings		AGB Nielsen	
Ep.	Original Broadcast Date	Title	Nationwide	Seoul	Nationwide	Seoul
1	October 9, 2017 (Note: Four episodes were shown back-to-back as no episodes would be aired on October 10 due to a football friendly match between South Korea and Morocco.)	The Girl We Used to Love	4.9% (NR)	5.5% (NR)	4.2% (NR)	4.8% (NR)
2	October 9, 2017	The Girl We Used to Love	4.6% (NR)	5.3% (NR)	3.9% (NR)	4.7% (NR)
3	October 9, 2017	Love Story	4.7% (NR)	5.4% (NR)	3.5% (NR)	4.2% (NR)
4	October 9, 2017	Love Story	3.8% (NR)	4.7% (NR)	3.1% (NR)	3.9% (NR)
5	October 16, 2017	Love Letter	3.6% (NR)	4.0% (NR)	3.2% (NR)	3.6% (NR)
6	October 16, 2017	Love Letter	3.9% (NR)	4.4% (NR)	3.5% (NR)	4.0% (NR)
7	October 17, 2017	August's Christmas	4.5% (NR)	4.8% (NR)	3.7% (NR)	4.1% (NR)
8	October 17, 2017	August's Christmas	4.7% (NR)	5.2% (NR)	4.3% (NR)	4.8% (NR)
9	October 23, 2017	Everyone Has a Secret	3.7% (NR)	4.3% (NR)	3.2% (NR)	3.9% (NR)
10	October 23, 2017	Everyone Has a Secret	4.1% (NR)	4.4% (NR)	3.7% (NR)	4.0% (NR)
11	October 24, 2017	Happy Together	4.3% (NR)	5.1% (NR)	3.0% (NR)	3.8% (NR)
12	October 24, 2017	Happy Together	4.7% (NR)	5.6% (NR)	3.0% (NR)	3.9% (NR)
13	October 30, 2017	P.S. I Love You	3.8% (NR)	3.9% (NR)	2.8% (NR)	3.1% (NR)
14	October 30, 2017	P.S. I Love You	3.8% (NR)	4.0% (NR)	3.1% (NR)	3.2% (NR)
15	October 31, 2017	Stand by Me	4.1% (NR)	4.2% (NR)	3.3% (NR)	3.4% (NR)
16	October 31, 2017	Stand by Me	4.0% (NR)	4.4% (NR)	3.5% (NR)	3.9% (NR)
17	November 6, 2017	Ten Reasons Why I Can't Love You	3.3% (NR)	3.4% (NR)	2.5% (NR)	2.6% (NR)
18	November 6, 2017	Ten Reasons Why I Can't Love You	3.4% (NR)	3.5% (NR)	2.7% (NR)	2.8% (NR)
19	November 7, 2017	We Got Married	4.3% (NR)	4.9% (NR)	2.9% (NR)	3.5% (NR)
20	November 7, 2017	We Got Married	3.9% (NR)	4.1% (NR)	2.8% (NR)	3.0% (NR)
21	November 13, 2017	Sweet as Honey - As Sweet as a Dream	4.2% (NR)	4.4% (NR)	2.8% (NR)	3.0% (NR)
22	November 13, 2017	Sweet as Honey - As Sweet as a Dream	3.8% (NR)	4.1% (NR)	2.7% (NR)	2.9% (NR)
23	November 14, 2017	I Love You, I'm Sorry, Thanks	3.8% (NR)	4.2% (NR)	3.4% (NR)	3.8% (NR)
24	November 14, 2017	I Love You, I'm Sorry, Thanks	3.8% (NR)	4.1% (NR)	3.0% (NR)	3.3% (NR)
25	November 20, 2017	While You Are in Love	2.2% (NR)	2.4% (NR)	1.8% (NR)	2.0% (NR)
26	November 20, 2017	While You Are in Love	2.7% (NR)	3.0% (NR)	2.1% (NR)	2.4% (NR)
27	November 21, 2017	Before Sunrise	2.7% (NR)	2.8% (NR)	2.1% (NR)	2.2% (NR)
28	November 21, 2017	Before Sunrise	3.2% (NR)	3.3% (NR)	2.3% (NR)	2.4% (NR)
29	November 27, 2017 (Note: Moved to 20:50 due to low ratings. The original time-slot was taken over by the following drama Two Cops.)	Begin Again	4.1% (NR)	4.3% (NR)	3.2% (NR)	3.4% (NR)
30	November 27, 2017	Begin Again	4.5% (NR)	5.0% (NR)	3.5% (NR)	3.9% (NR)
31	November 28, 2017	Happy Ending	3.7% (NR)	4.5% (NR)	2.8% (NR)	3.6% (NR)
32	November 28, 2017	Happy Ending	5.0% (NR)	5.8% (NR)	4.0% (NR)	4.7% (NR)
Average			3.9%	4.3%	3.1%	3.5%

== Awards and nominations ==
Year	Award	Category	Nominee	Result
2017	36th MBC Drama Awards	Top Excellence Award, Actor in a Monday-Tuesday Drama	Kim Ji-seok	Won
2017	36th MBC Drama Awards	Top Excellence Award, Actress in a Monday-Tuesday Drama	Han Ye-seul	Nominated
2017	36th MBC Drama Awards	Excellence Award, Actor in a Monday-Tuesday Drama	Lee Sang-woo	Nominated
2017	36th MBC Drama Awards	Golden Acting Award, Actor in a Monday-Tuesday Drama	Ahn Se-ha	Nominated
2017	36th MBC Drama Awards	Golden Acting Award, Actress in a Monday-Tuesday Drama	Ryu Hyun-kyung	Nominated
2017	36th MBC Drama Awards	Popularity Award, Actor	Kim Ji-seok	Nominated
2017	36th MBC Drama Awards	Popularity Award, Actress	Han Ye-seul	Nominated
2017	36th MBC Drama Awards	Best New Actress	Lee Sang-hee	Nominated
