= Delivery Man (TV series) =

2023 South Korean television series

- Promotional poster
- Hangul: 딜리버리맨
- RR: Dillibeori maen
- MR: Tillibŏri maen
- Genre: Fantasy; Romance; Comedy; Mystery
- Written by: Joo Hyo-jin; Park Hye-young; Han Bo-kyung
- Directed by: Kang Sol; Park Dae-hee
- Starring: Yoon Chan-young; Bang Min-ah; Kim Min-seok
- Music by: Kim Jong-cheon
- Country of origin: South Korea
- Original language: Korean
- No. of episodes: 12

Production
- Executive producer: Lee Joo-ho
- Producers: Lim Min-joo; Kim Young-ha; Park Jae-woo
- Running time: 60 minutes
- Production company: Kortop Media

Original release
- Network: ENA
- Release: March 1 – April 6, 2023

Delivery Man (Korean: 딜리버리맨) is a 2023 South Korean television series starring Yoon Chan-young, Bang Min-ah, and Kim Min-seok. It is an original drama of Genie TV, and is available for streaming on its platform, and on TVING (in South Korea), Viki and Viu in selected regions. It also aired on ENA from March 1 to April 6, 2023, every Wednesday and Thursday at 21:00 (KST) for 16 episodes.

== Synopsis ==
The series is a comedic investigative drama about a taxi driver who grants the last wishes of ghosts.

== Cast ==
=== Main ===
- Yoon Chan-young as Seo Young-min, a livelihood taxi driver who runs a one-of-a-kind business known as "Ghost-Only Taxi"
- Bang Min-ah as Kang Ji-hyun, a ghost who has lost her memory
- Kim Min-seok as Do Gyu-jin, a handsome doctor with perfect specifications

=== Supporting ===
- Kim Seung-soo as Ji Chang-seok, leader of the violent team at Dongpa Police Station
- Park Hye-jin as Park Bun-ja, Young-min's grandmother
- Park Jeong-hak as Kang Hyung-soo, Ji-hyun's father
- Heo Ji-na as Kim Hee-yeon, head nurse in the emergency room of Daehun Hospital
- Lee Hye-jung as Yoon So-ri, a new nurse at the emergency room of Daehun Hospital
- Lee Gyu-hyeon as Kim Jeong-woo, a nurse in the emergency room of Daehun Hospital
- Ha Kyung as Lee Dong-wook, a talented shaman

=== Extended ===
- Choi Tae-hwan as Na Seok-jin, Young-min's friend
- Kim Seon-hyuk as Kim Byung-cheol
- Oh Su-jeong as Park So-yeon
- Moon Hee-kyung as Park Kyung-hwa
- Jo Mi-nyeo as Lee Eun-soo
- Lee Hye-eun as Kim Jin-sook
- Park Sun-ho as Kim Shin-woo
- Kal So-won as Choi Ha-yul
- Shin Yi-joon as Choi Mi-ra
- Woo Tae-ha as Baek Tae-woo
- Shin Bi as Yoon Ga-eun
- Jang Seon-yul as Choi Ha-jun
- Kim Jung-tae as Go Du-gang
- Choi Cho-woo as Eun-soo's mother
- Kim Da-bi as Oh Mi-kyung
- Jung Jong-woo as Gu-bong

=== Special appearances ===
- Jeon So-min as a ghost
- Jun Hyo-seong as Go Se-ra

== Viewership ==
Delivery Man : South Korea viewers per episode (thousands)

Season	Episode number											
Season	1	2	3	4	5	6	7	8	9	10	11	12
1	311	N/A	237	N/A	275	N/A	265	N/A	227	228	226	253

Source: Audience measurement performed nationwide by Nielsen Korea.

Average TV viewership ratings
Ep.	Original broadcast date	Average audience share (Nielsen Korea)	
Ep.	Original broadcast date	Nationwide	Seoul
1	March 1, 2023	1.1% (19th)	N/A
2	March 2, 2023	0.7% (NR)	N/A
3	March 8, 2023	1.0% (15th)	1.078% (7th)
4	March 9, 2023	1.0% (10th)	1.114% (8th)
5	March 15, 2023	1.0% (11th)	1.181% (8th)
6	March 16, 2023	1.0% (13th)	1.111% (8th)
7	March 22, 2023	1.1% (10th)	N/A
8	March 23, 2023	0.8% (NR)	N/A
9	March 29, 2023	0.9% (13th)	N/A
10	March 30, 2023	1.3% (7th)	N/A
11	April 5, 2023	0.9% (NR)	N/A
12	April 6, 2023	1.2% (10th)	1.369% (9th)
Average		1.0%	— (Note: Due to some unpublished ratings, the exact average rating is unknown.)
In the table above, the blue numbers represent the lowest ratings and the red numbers represent the highest ratings.; N/A denotes ratings that were not published.; NR denotes that the series did not rank in the top 20 daily programs on that date.; This series aired on a cable channel/pay TV which normally has a relatively smaller audience compared to free-to-air TV/public broadcasters (KBS, SBS, MBC and EBS).
