= Landscape in My Heart =

- 그대의 풍경
- Written by: Park Jin-suk
- Directed by: Han Jeong-hye
- Starring: Heo Young-ran; Kim Cheol-ki; Park Mun-su; Im Yeo-won
- Country of origin: South Korea

Production
- Camera setup: Multi-camera
- Running time: Monday to Friday, 30 mins

Original release
- Network: KBS
- Release: April 30 – November 9, 2007

Landscape in My Heart (Korean: 그대의 풍경), also known as Your Scene, is a 2007 romance K-drama and soap opera set in the 1960s–1970s. The program was directed by Han Jeong-hye and written by Park Jin-suk and stars Heo Young-ran in her first leading role since her debut 11 years prior. The program aired on weekday mornings on KBS1 as part of the KBS TV Novel television series from April 30, 2007 to November 9, 2007. Landscape in My Heart received high ratings among older women, with critics calling the drama nostalgia fuel. The program succeeded Sunok and was succeeded by Beautiful Days.

== Background ==
Screenwriter Park Jin-sook stated that the program was inspired by his own experiences in boarding houses during his youth.

== Plot ==
The show is set in a boarding house in the 1960s and 1970s and is about a woman named Han Soo-ryun (Heo Young-ran) who breaks up with her high school lover Park Dong-hyek, before realizing that she is pregnant with a baby girl, later named Bobae. Soo-ryun later marries Wo Jong-ku who cares for her more than Dong-hyek; a problem arises when she finds out that Bobae is her daughter.

== Cast ==
- Heo Young-ran as Han Soo-ryun, a single mother.
- Kim Cheol-ki as Woo Jong-goo.
- Park Mun-su as Park Dong-hyuk.
- Im Yeo-won as Son Yoon-joo.
- Kim Yong-rim as Hwang Jung-sun, the host of the boarding house.
- Kang Seok-woo as Na Pan-soo.
- Lee Hye-sook as Jang Mo-ran.
- Lee Eun-saem as Si-eun.
- Kim Hyun-joo as Han Young-ok
- Yeon Kyu-jin as Woo Kwang-nam
- Lee Hye-sook as Jang Mo-ran
- Kim Jae-in as Woo Jong-sook
- Yuk Dong-il as Woo Jong-min
- Min Wook as Dong-hyuk's dad
- Kang Seok-woo as Na Pan-soo
- Kang Kyung-hun as Jo Hye-rin
- Moon Chun-sik as Kong Sang-chul
- Nam Young-jin as Manager Choi
- Ahn Hae-suk as Dong-hyuk's mom
- Oh Ji-young as Miss Ji
- Jung So-hee as Madame Yoon
- Lee Eun-saem as Seung-nam
- Sun Jung-hwa

== Soundtrack ==
The program incorporated various older pop songs in its soundtrack, including "Mr. Lonely" (1964), the album Epitaph, and "The Spring Day passes" (1953).

== Ratings ==
The show averaged ratings of 11.7%, with the last episode of Landscape in My Heart achieving its peak rating of 16.0%.
