= Lee Sang-hee (actress) =

South Korean actress (born 1983)

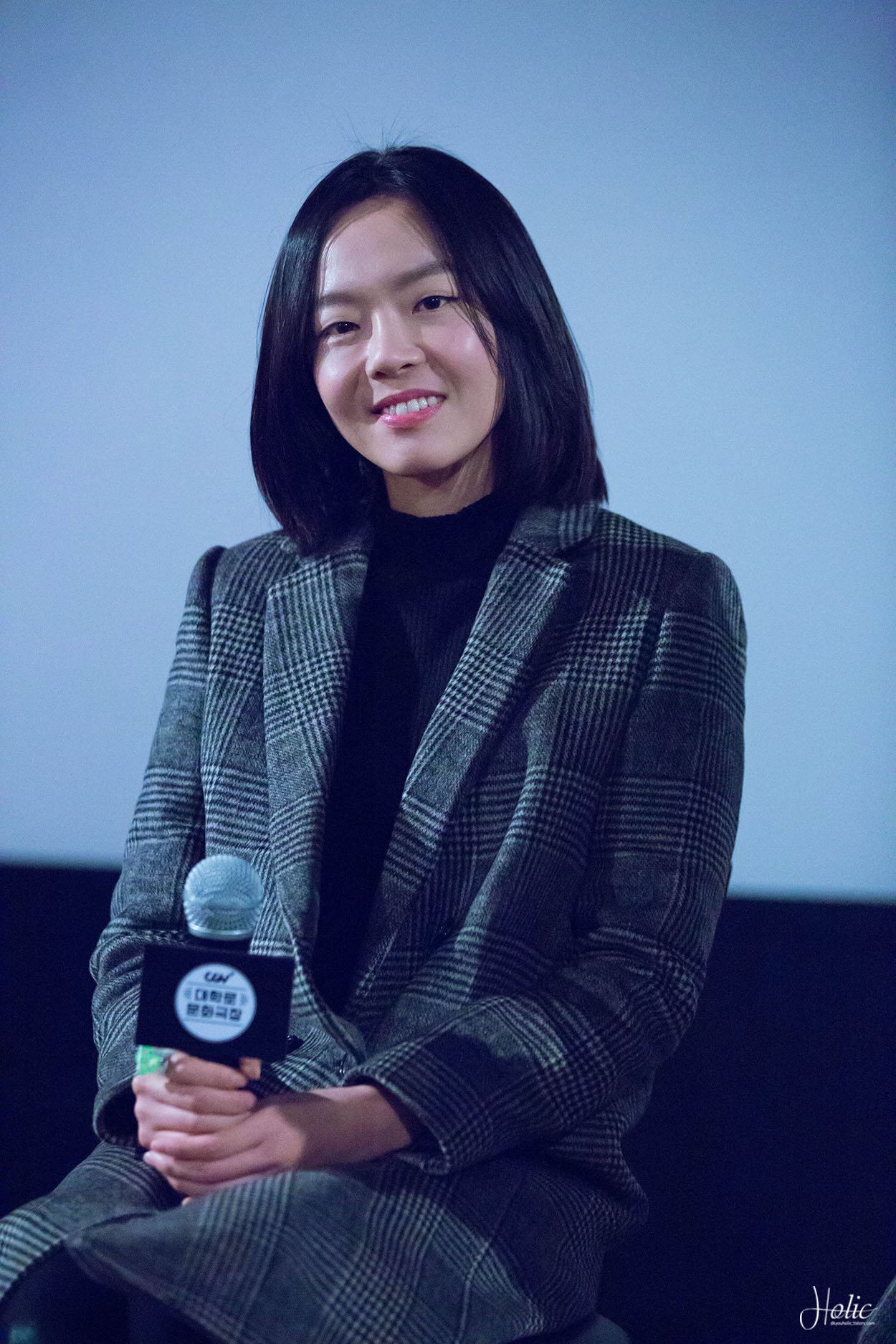
- Lee in January 2016
- Born: Lee Na-ri; October 8, 1983 (age 42); Ulsan, South Korea
- Occupation: Actress
- Years active: 2011–present
- Agent: Clover Company

Korean name
- Hangul: 이나리
- RR: I Nari
- MR: I Nari

Stage name
- Hangul: 이상희
- RR: I Sanghui
- MR: I Sanghŭi

Lee Sang-hee (Korean: 이상희; October 8, 1983), born Lee Na-ri (이나리), is a South Korean actress. She first became known for her role in the film End of Winter (2014). She later rose to prominence and gained recognition for her role in the film Our Love Story (2016). She also appeared in television series such as Children of the 20th Century (2017) and One Spring Night (2019).

== Filmography ==
=== Film ===
Year	Title	Role
2016	One Way Trip	Nurse
2016	Phantom Detective	Hong Gil-dong's mother
2016	The Truth Beneath	Choi Mi-ok's stepmother
2016	End of Winter	Kang Hye-jung
2016	Jamsil (Magnanery)	Chae Mi-hee
2016	Tunnel	YTN news reporter
2016	Seoul Station	Volunteer (voice)
2016	The Age of Shadows	Baby's mother
2016	Our Love Story	Yoon-joo
2017	Come, Together	Admin
2017	Late Summer, Late Fall	Sun-ah
2017	I Can Speak	Hye-jung
2017	No Man's Land	PD Oh
2017	Mothers	Mi-ran
2018	Golden Slumber	Geum Cheol-cheo
2018	Winter's Night	Soldier's girlfriend
2019	Another Child	Nurse in charge
2020	Somewhere in Between	Young Eun
2021	A Distant Place	Eun Young
2021	Happy Children	Park Jeong-eun
2022	Decibel	Jang Yoo-jung
2024	My Name Is Loh Kiwan	Seon-ju
TBA	Jung's Ranch	Kyungeun

=== Television series ===
Year	Title	Role	Notes	Ref.
2016	KBS Drama Special: "Dance from Afar"	Choi Hyun	One act-drama	
2017	Children of the 20th Century	Jang Young-shim		
2018	Mistress	Park Jung-sim		
2018	Life	Kim Eun-ha		
2019	One Spring Night	Song Yeong-joo		
2019	When the Devil Calls Your Name	Messenger	Cameo (episode 13–16)	
2019–2020	Diary of a Prosecutor	Oh Yoon-jin		
2020	A Piece of Your Mind	Jeon Eun-joo		
2021	Secret Royal Inspector & Joy	Kwang-soon		
2022	All of Us Are Dead	Park Sun-hwa		
2022	Juvenile Justice	Joo Young-sil		
2022	May It Please the Court	Yoo Gyeong-jin		
2022	Unlock My Boss	Oh Mi-ran		
2023	Daily Dose of Sunshine	Park Soo-yeon		
2024	Mr. Plankton	Hongcheon woman	Cameo (episode 9–10)	
2025	Love Scout	Seo Mi-ae		
2025	The Recruit Season 2	Kim Nan-hee		
2025	Mercy for None	Lawyer	Cameo (episode 2, 7)	
2025	Our Movie	Yoo Eun-ae	Cameo (episode 3, 5, 8)	
2025	Tempest	Yeo Mi-ji		
2026	The Husband	Kim Kyung-ae		

=== Web series ===
Year	Title	Role	Notes	Ref.
2013	Missing Prequel	Mistress' wife		
2014	Momo Salon	Eun-hye		
2022	People of the Blue House	Senior secretary		
2026	If Wishes Could Kill	Eop-soon	Cameo (Episode 6)	
2026	Teach You a Lesson	Jeong Sun-young	(Episode 3&10)	

=== Hosting ===
Year	Title	Notes	Ref.
2018–present	Jeongdongjin Independent Film Festival	with Woo Ji-hyun	
2022	Closing ceremony 23rd Jeonju International Film Festival	with Kang Gil-woo	
2023	Closing ceremony 24th Jeonju International Film Festival	with Kang Gil-woo	

=== Music video appearances ===
Year	Song title	Artist
2016	"Namhae"	Huckleberry Finn
2023	"Come Back to Me"	RM (BTS)

== Awards and nominations ==
Year	Award	Category	Recipient	Result
2015	5th Sakhalin International Film Festival	Best Actress	End of Winter	Won
2017	4th Wildflower Film Awards	Best Actress	Our Love Story	Nominated
2017	4th Wildflower Film Awards	Best New Actress	Our Love Story	Won
2017	53rd Baeksang Arts Awards	Best New Actress	Our Love Story	Won
2017	22nd Chunsa Film Art Awards	Best New Actress	Our Love Story	Won
2017	26th Buil Film Awards	Best New Actress	Our Love Story	Nominated
2017	38th Blue Dragon Film Awards	Best New Actress	Our Love Story	Nominated
2017	1st The Seoul Awards	Best New Actress	I Can Speak	Nominated
2017	MBC Drama Awards	Best New Actress	Children of the 20th Century	Nominated
2019	6th Wildflower Film Awards	Best Actress	Jamsil	Nominated
2019	MBC Drama Awards	Best Supporting Cast in a Wednesday-Thursday Miniseries	One Spring Night	Nominated
2024	60th Baeksang Arts Awards	Best Supporting Actress – Film	My Name Is Loh Kiwan	Won
2025	SBS Drama Awards	Best Supporting Actress in a Miniseries Seasonal Drama	Love Scout	Won
