= Son Sang-yeon =

South Korean actor (born 2002)

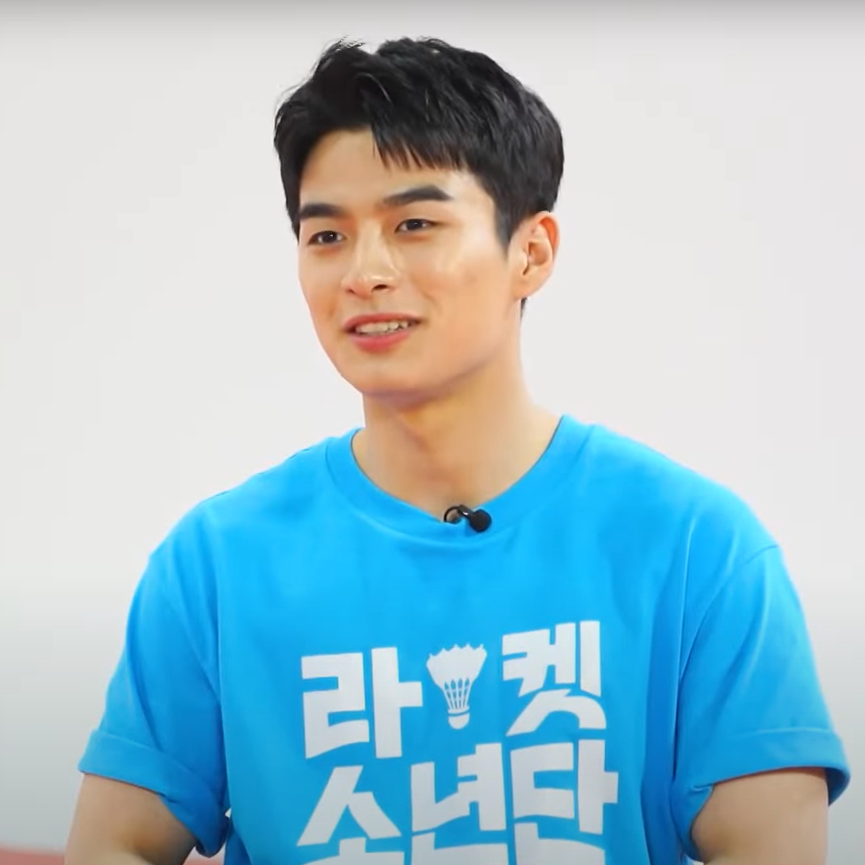
- Son in May 2021
- Born: April 2, 2002 (age 24); Daejeon, South Korea
- Education: Seoul Baemyeong High School
- Occupation: Actor
- Years active: 2016–present
- Agent: Awesome ENT

Korean name
- Hangul: 손상연
- Hanja: 孫相延
- RR: Son Sangyeon
- MR: Son Sangyŏn

Son Sang-yeon (Korean: 손상연; born April 2, 2002) is a South Korean actor. He made his debut as a cast member in the 2016 Tooniverse variety show; Maknae Show 7 and has since starred in other variety shows, television series, web series, films, and a music video. Son established himself as young actor by performing roles as young version of main lead in Suspicious Partner (2017), Revolutionary Love (2017) and Clean with Passion for Now (2018). He rose to prominence with the 2021 television series Racket Boys as Bang Yoon-dam, for which he was awarded the best new actor award at 2021 SBS Drama Awards. In 2022, he starred Netflix series All of Us Are Dead as Jang Woo-jin.

== Early life ==
Son is from the Seo district (Seo-gu) of Daejeon where he completed his middle school studies until he and his family moved to Seoul. There, he continued his high school education in the Seoul Baemyeong High School whilst pursuing his acting career.

== Career ==
Son is affiliated to Awesome ENT artist talent agency. He debuted in 2016 as a cast member of Maknae Show 7 and has taken on numerous guest and support roles in television and web dramas since then. His first main role was in 2019 in the web drama, Triple Fling.

He is known for his main role in Racket Boys as Bang Yoon-dam, captain of his school badminton team. For which, he extensively trained for months as a badminton player along with the other cast members of the series. He was awarded with Best New Actor award at 2021 SBS Drama Awards for his portrayal of Bang Yoon-dam in the series.

== Personal life ==
=== Military service ===
Son enlisted in the military training center on November 8, 2021. Son was discharged from military service on May 7, 2023.

== Filmography ==
=== Films ===
Year	Title	Role	Notes	Ref.
2017	A Special Lady	Gong Myung (10 y.o.)	Guest Role	
2019	The Fault Is Not Yours	Yong Joo		
2019	House of Hummingbird	Dae Hoon (Eun-hee's brother)		
2024	Officer Black Belt	Lee Yang Ho		

=== Television series ===
Year	Title	Role	Notes	Ref.
2016	My Fair Lady		Guest Role	
2016	First Love Again	Hwang Je-ha		
2017	Super Family	Nephew	Guest Role	
2017	Chicago Typewriter	Baek Tae-min (young)		
2017	Two Cops	Cha Dong-tak (young)		
2017	Revolutionary Love	Kwon Je-hoon (young)		
2017	The Return of Hwang Geum-bok	Bully		
2017	Bad Thief, Good Thief	Bully		
2017	Suspicious Partner	Noh Ji-wook (young)		
2017	Summer Days	Kim Ji-yong (young)		
2017	The Happy Loner	Guest Role	one act-drama	
2018	Clean with Passion for Now	Jang Sun-gyeol (young)	Cameo (Ep. 5)	
2019	Level Up	Kang Hoon		
2020	Dr. Romantic 2	Kang Ik-joon	Cameo (Ep. 11–14)	
2021	Racket Boys	Bang Yoon-dam		
2023	The Matchmakers	Lee Si-yeol		
2025	My Dearest Nemesis	Baek Soo-bin	Supporting Role	
2025	Our Golden Days	Lee Ji-wan		

=== Web series ===
Year	Title	Role	Notes	Ref.
2019	FAILing in Love	Kang Pa-rang		
2019	Triple Fling	Song Ji-ho	Season 1–2	
2022	All of Us Are Dead	Jang Woo-jin		

=== Television shows ===
Year	Title	Role	Ref.
2016	Maknae Show 7	Cast Member	
2016–2017	Dream Junior	Cast Member	

=== Music video appearances ===
Year	Song	Artist	Notes	Ref.
2020	"Enough"	Hoppipolla	Male Student	

== Awards and nominations ==
Name of the award ceremony, year presented, category, nominee of the award, and the result of the nomination
Award ceremony	Year	Category	Nominee / Work	Result	Ref.
SBS Drama Awards	2021	Best New Actor	Racket Boys	Won	
