= Yoo In-soo =

South Korean actor

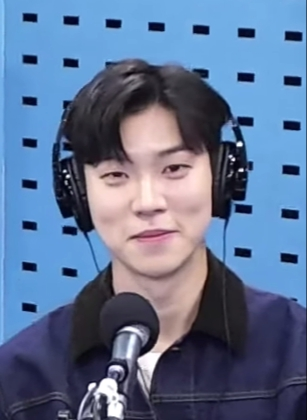
- Yoo in March 2024
- Born: March 25, 1998 (age 28); Cheonan, South Korea
- Occupation: Actor
- Years active: 2016–present
- Agent: Management District

Korean name
- Hangul: 유인수
- RR: Yu Insu
- MR: Yu Insu

Yoo In-soo (Korean: 유인수; born March 25, 1998) is a South Korean actor. He gained recognition for his roles in the Netflix original All of Us Are Dead (2022), and historical fiction fantasy period drama Alchemy of Souls (2022–2023).

== Filmography ==
=== Film ===
Year	Title	Role	Notes	Ref.
2017	Forgotten	High school student	Bit part	
2023	Swallow	young Hyeon-soo		
2023	The Loan Boy	Nam-yeong		
2025	Boy	Gyohan		

=== Television series ===
Year	Title	Role	Notes	Ref.
2017	Strong Girl Bong-soon	Kang-goo	Bit part	
2017	School 2017	Min-joon	Bit part	
2017	While You Were Sleeping	Seung-won's classmate	Bit part	
2017	Avengers Social Club	Kyung-bok	Bit part	
2018	Life	Choi Woo-jin	Bit part	
2018	Gangnam Beauty	Park Nae-sun	Bit part	
2018	Drama Special: "The Long Goodbye"	Na Kyung-soo	One act-drama	
2018	Tale of Fairy	Prof. Jung's student	Bit part	
2019	At Eighteen	Yoo Pil-sang		
2019	Love Alarm	Student	Bit part	
2019–2020	Chocolate	Jo Seung-goo	Bit part	
2020	Stranger 2	Seung-jun	Bit part	
2021	At a Distance, Spring Is Green	Oh Chun-gook		
2022–present	All of Us Are Dead	Yoon Gwi-nam		
2022	Alchemy of Souls	Park Dang-gu	Part 1–2	
2022	Fly High Butterfly	Song Kang-in		
2023	The Good Bad Mother	Bang Sam-sik		
2023	The Uncanny Counter	Na Jeok-bong	Season 2	
2023	Daily Dose of Sunshine	Ji Seung-jae		
2023–2024	Death's Game	Lee Jin-sang		
2024	The Midnight Studio	Assistant Manager Go		
2025	Study Group	Choo Jae-hwang	Cameo (episode 9–10)	
2025	Good Boy	Bagboy	Cameo (episode 1)	
2027	Embassy for Foreign Monsters in Korea	Do Ji-hyuk		

=== Web series ===
Year	Title	Role	Notes	Ref.
2017	Sweet Revenge	Choi Il-jin		

== Theater ==
Theater play performance
Year	Title		Role	Theater	Date	Ref.
Year	English	Korean	Role	Theater	Date	Ref.
2017	Beautiful Week	아름다운 일주일	Jeong-hoon			
2017	Chuncheon Byulmuri	춘천별무리	Du-sik			
2018	Cod Head	북어대가리	Jaang			
2024	Island	아일랜드	John	Cordell Art Hall	July 23 to 28	

== Awards and nominations ==
Name of the award ceremony, year presented, category, nominee of the award, and the result of the nomination
Award ceremony	Year	Category	Nominee / Work	Result	Ref.
Asia Model Festival	2023	Rising Star Award – Actor	Yoo In-soo	Won	
Baeksang Arts Awards	2022	Best New Actor – Television	All of Us Are Dead	Nominated	
SAC Youth Acting Contest Grand Prize	2016	Youth Acting Contest Grand Prize in Monologue Acting Category	Yoo In-soo	Won	
