= Yoon Chan-young =

South Korean actor (born 2001)

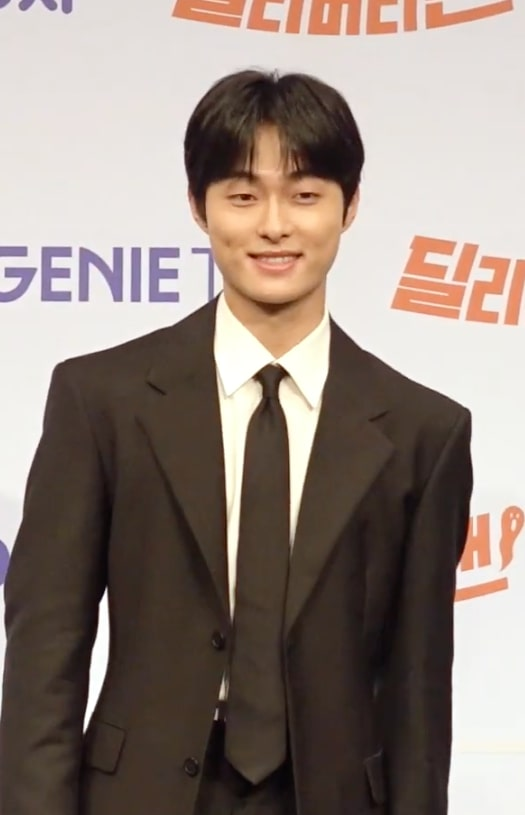
- Yoon in 2025
- Born: April 25, 2001 (age 25); Seoul, South Korea
- Education: Hanyang University
- Occupation: Actor
- Years active: 2013–present
- Agent: Snowball Entertainment

Korean name
- Hangul: 윤찬영
- RR: Yun Chanyeong
- MR: Yun Ch'anyŏng

Yoon Chan-young (Korean: 윤찬영; born April 25, 2001) is a South Korean actor. He began his career as a child actor and gained wider recognition for his appearance as Lee Cheong-san in the Netflix series All of Us Are Dead (2022) and the web series called High School Return of a Gangster (2024).

== Filmography ==
=== Film ===
Year	Title	Role	Notes	Ref.
2014	The Legacy	Han Jung-do (young)		
2014	Mourning Grave	Kang In-soo (young)		
2014	Manhole	Soo-chul (young)		
2017	My Son Is Puberty	Woo Han-chul		
2017	Mothers	Jong-wook		
2019	Birthday	Jung Soo-ho		
2019	The Fault Is Not Yours	Joon-young / Ji-geun		
2020	Light for the Youth	Yi-joon		

=== Television series ===
Year	Title	Role	Notes	Ref.
2013	When a Man Falls in Love	Lee Jae-hee (young)		
2013	Monstar	Jung Sun-woo (young)		
2014	Pluto Squad	Lee Woo-jin		
2014	Gap-dong	Ryu Tae-oh (young)		
2014	Mama	Han Geu-roo		
2015	Splendid Politics	Hong Joo-won (young)		
2015	Six Flying Dragons	Ddang-sae (young)		
2015	Bubble Gum	Park Ri-hwan (young)		
2016	Blow Breeze	Lee Jang-go (young)		
2016	Dr. Romantic	Kang Dong-joo (young)		
2017	The Bride of Habaek	Shin Hoo-ye (young)		
2017	The King in Love	Wang Rin (young)		
2018	Oh, the Mysterious	Kim Jong-sam (young)		
2018	Still 17	Gong Woo-jin (young)		
2019	Everything and Nothing	Go Min-jae		
2019	Doctor John	Lee Ki-seok		
2020	Nobody Knows	Joo Dong-myung		
2020	Do You Like Brahms?	Seung Ji-min	cameo	
2022–present	All of Us Are Dead	Lee Cheong-san	Season 1–2	
2022	Hope or Dope	Gong Yoon-tak	Season 1–2	
2023	Delivery Man	Seo Young-min		
2024	High School Return of a Gangster	Song Yi-heon / Kim Deuk-pal	Season 1	
2025	Hyper Knife	Seo Young-joo		

== Accolades ==
=== Awards and nominations ===
Name of the award ceremony, year presented, category, nominee of the award, and the result of the nomination
Award	Year	Category	Nominated work	Result	Ref.
APAN Star Awards	2014	Best Young Actor	Mama	Won	
APAN Star Awards	2022	Best New Actor	All of Us Are Dead	Won	
Director's Cut Awards	2023	Best New Actor in Television	All of Us Are Dead	Nominated	
MBC Drama Awards	2014	Best Young Actor	Mama	Won	
MBC Drama Awards	2016	Best Young Actor	Blow Breeze	Nominated	
MBC Drama Awards	2017	Best Young Actor	The King in Love	Nominated	
SBS Drama Awards	2018	Best Young Actor	Still 17	Nominated	
SBS Drama Awards	2019	Best Young Actor	Everything and Nothing; Doctor John	Won	
Wildflower Film Awards	2019	Best New Actor	Mothers	Nominated	

=== State honors ===
Name of country, year given, and name of honor
Country	Organization	Year	Honor Or Award	Ref.
South Korea	Newsis K-Expo Cultural Awards (Note: Established in 2019 and co-sponsored by Korea's Ministry of Culture, Sports and Tourism, Ministry of Foreign Affairs, Korea Creative Content Agency, Seoul Metropolitan Council and the Seoul Tourism Organization, it awards cultural icons, businesses, and individuals who have contributed greatly to Hallyu, the Korean wave.)	2022	Seoul Tourism Foundation CEO Award	
