= Kim Min-ju =

South Korean actress (born 2001)

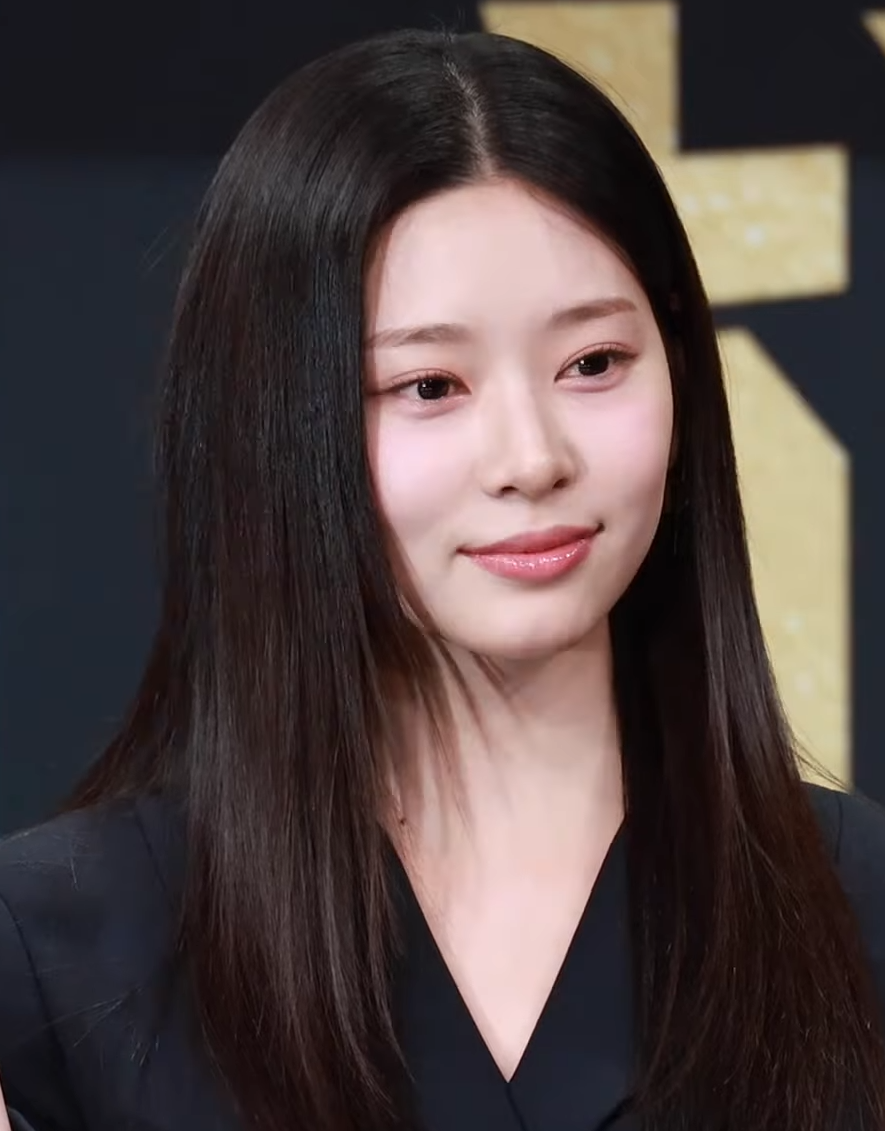
- Kim in February 2025
- Born: February 5, 2001 (age 25); Seoul, South Korea
- Education: School of Performing Arts Seoul
- Occupations: Actress; singer
- Years active: 2018–present
- Agent: Management Soop
- Musical career
- Genres: K-pop; J-pop
- Instrument: Vocals
- Years active: 2018–2021
- Labels: Off the Record (Note: As a member of Iz*One only.); EMI
- Formerly of: Iz*One

Korean name
- Hangul: 김민주
- Hanja: 金玟周
- RR: Gim Minju
- MR: Kim Minju

Signature
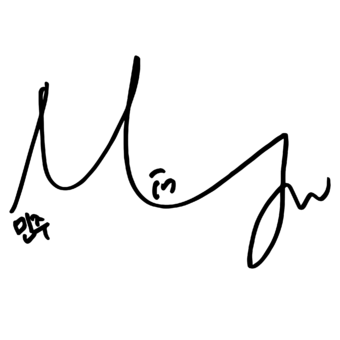

Kim Min-ju (Korean: 김민주; born February 5, 2001) is a South Korean actress and former singer. She was a member of the South Korean–Japanese girl group Iz*One from 2018 to 2021. As an actress, she has appeared in films and TV shows including Tempted (2018), The Fault Is Not Yours (2019), The Forbidden Marriage (2022–2023), Hear Me: Our Summer (2024), and Still Shining (2026).

== Life and career ==
=== Early life and career beginnings ===
Kim was born on February 5, 2001. She has a younger sister and an older brother. She attended School of Performing Arts Seoul and graduated in February 2020. In 2016, she was part of a pre-debut girl group called Girls' Recipe, whose debut was ultimately scrapped in the same year. Prior to joining the reality girl group survival show Produce 48, she had appeared as an actress in music videos and Korean dramas, notably the 2018 MBC television series Tempted, wherein she portrayed the role of the young Choi Su-ji (Moon Ga-young).

=== 2018–2021: Produce 48, Iz*One, solo activities ===
From June to August 2018, Kim represented Urban Works on Produce 48. On the finale episode, she eventually placed eleventh and thus joined the show's final debut lineup, Iz*One. On October 29, 2018, she officially debuted as a member of the group with the release of their first extended play (EP) Color*Iz.

In 2019, Kim starred in the film The Fault Is Not Yours, which premiered in May at the 20th Jeonju International Film Festival. It was recorded prior to her appearing in Produce 48.

In June 2020, Kim was chosen as a co-host for the South Korean music program Show! Music Core.

=== 2021–present: Solo career, return to acting and new agency ===
After Iz*One's disbandment on April 29, 2021, Kim returned to Urban Works. On October 7, her company officially announced that she will promote as an actress.

On September 1, 2022, Kim departed Urban Works and signed a contract with Management Soop.

In 2022, Kim starred in the historical drama The Forbidden Marriage, an adaptation of the same webtoon, for which Kim received the Best New Actress Award at the 2022 MBC Drama Awards.

In 2024, Kim played the role of Ga-eul in the movie Hear Me: Our Summer, which was directed by Cho Sun-Ho. She also won Best New Actress in the 2024 SBS Drama Awards for her role in Connection. In 2025, she played the role of Lee Ye-na in the MBC drama Undercover High School.

In 2026, Kim starred as the female lead Mo Eun-ah in the JTBC drama Still Shining.

== Discography ==
=== Soundtrack appearance ===
List of soundtrack appearances, showing year released and album name
Title	Year	Album
"Christmas" (크리스마스)	2019	The Fault Is Not Yours OST

=== Guest appearance ===
List of non-single guest appearances with other performing artist(s)
Title	Year	Other artist(s)	Album
"Falling Star"	2018	Kriesha Chu	Dream of Paradise

=== Songwriting credits ===
All song credits are adapted from the Korea Music Copyright Association's database unless stated otherwise.

Year	Song	Album	Artist	Notes
2019	"Really Like You"	Heart*Iz	Iz*One	as lyricist
2019	"Neko ni Naritai (Korean Ver.)"	Heart*Iz	Iz*One	as lyricist
2019	"Love Bubble"	Vampire	Iz*One	as lyricist
2020	"You & I"	Bloom*Iz	Iz*One	as lyricist
2020	"With*One"	Oneiric Diary	Iz*One	as lyricist

== Filmography ==
=== Film ===
Year	Title	Role	Ref.
2019	The Fault Is Not Yours	Soo-yeon	
2024	Hear Me: Our Summer	Seo Ga-eul	

=== Television series ===
Year	Title	Role	Ref.
2018	Tempted	Choi Su-ji (young)	
2022–2023	The Forbidden Marriage	Ahn Ja-yeon / Cha-nyeon	
2024	Connection	Oh Yun-jin (young)	
2025	Undercover High School	Lee Ye-na	
2026	Still Shining	Mo Eun-ah	
TBA	Beauty in the Beast	Ha Min-su	

=== Web series ===
Year	Title	Role	Notes	Ref.
2016	Immortal Goddess	Vampire	Cameo (Episode 2)	
2019	A-Teen 2	Restaurant employee	Cameo (Episode 11)	

=== Television shows ===
Year	Title	Role	Notes	Ref.
2018	Produce 48	Contestant	Finished 11th	
2019	Happy Together	Special host	with Jang Won-young	
2020–2023	Show! Music Core	Host	with Chani, Hyunjin, Jungwoo, Lee Know	
2021	Where Is My Destination	Cast member		

=== Web shows ===
Year	Title	Role	Notes	Ref.
2021	Get It Beauty	Host	with Sandara Park	

=== Music video appearances ===
Year	Song Title	Artist	Ref.
2016	"#WYD (오늘 모해)"	iKon	
2017	"Trouble"	Kriesha Chu	
2018	"Like Paradise"	Kriesha Chu	

== Bibliography ==
=== Solo photobooks ===
Year	Title	Publisher	Catalog No./EAN	Notes	Ref.
2021	Kim Min-ju 1st Photobook [Pro Memoria]	Urban Works, Kakao Entertainment	L200002325 (EAN: 8804775250378)	First solo photobook	
2023	Kim Min-ju 1st Present [ALL MY FAVES]	Management SOOP, Kakao Entertainment	1544–4205	Second solo photobook	
2024	Kim Min-ju 2024 Season's Greetings 문득 Anywhere	Management SOOP	1000004433	First Solo Season's Greetings	

== Accolades ==
=== Awards and nominations ===
Name of the award ceremony, year presented, category, nominee of the award, and the result of the nomination
Award	Year	Category	Nominee / Work	Result	Ref.
Blue Dragon Film Awards	2025	Best New Actress	Hear Me: Our Summer	Nominated	
MBC Drama Awards	2022	Best New Actress	The Forbidden Marriage	Won	
MBC Entertainment Awards	2020	Female Rookie of the Year	Show! Music Core	Nominated	
MBC Entertainment Awards	2021	Rookie Award	Show! Music Core	Nominated	
SBS Drama Awards	2024	Best New Actress	Connection	Won	

=== State honors ===
Name of country or organization, year given, and name of honor or award
Country or Organization	Year	Honor or Award	Ref.
Newsis K-Expo Cultural Awards (Note: Co-sponsored by Korea's Ministry of Culture, Sports and Tourism, Ministry of Trade, Industry, and Energy, Korea Communications Commission, and Korea Creative Content Agency, it awards cultural icons and businesses who have contributed greatly to Hallyu, the Korean wave.)	2022	Seoul Tourism Foundation CEO Award	

=== Listicles ===
Name of publisher, year listed, name of listicle, and placement
Publisher	Year	Listicle	Placement	Ref.
Cine Rewind	2020	Special New Actor of the Year	Placed	
