= The Forbidden Marriage =

2022 South Korean television series

- Promotional poster
- Hangul: 금혼령, 조선 혼인 금지령
- Hanja: 禁婚令, 朝鮮 婚姻 禁止令
- Lit.: Geumhollyeong, Joseon's Marriage Ban
- RR: Geumhollyeong, Joseon honin geumjiryeong
- MR: Kŭmhollyŏng, Chosŏn honin kŭmjiryŏng
- Genre: Historical drama; Romantic comedy
- Based on: The Forbidden Marriage by Chun Ji-hye
- Developed by: Kim Ho-jun (planning)
- Written by: Chun Ji-hye
- Directed by: Park Sang-woo; Jeong Hoon
- Starring: Park Ju-hyun; Kim Young-dae; Kim Woo-seok
- Music by: Noh Hyeong-woo
- Country of origin: South Korea
- Original language: Korean
- No. of episodes: 12

Production
- Executive producers: Yoon Gi-taek; Oh Jin-seung
- Producers: Moon Seok-hwan; Oh Kwang-hee; Lee Dae-yong; Son Sang-beom
- Running time: 70 minutes
- Production company: Bon Factory

Original release
- Network: MBC TV
- Release: December 9, 2022 – January 21, 2023

The Forbidden Marriage (Korean: 금혼령, 조선 혼인 금지령) is a South Korean television series starring Park Ju-hyun, Kim Young-dae, and Kim Woo-seok. It is based on screenwriter Chun Ji-hye's own web novel of the same title, which was also released as a webtoon. It aired on MBC TV from December 9, 2022 to January 21, 2023, every Friday and Saturday at 21:50 (KST).

== Synopsis ==
Set in a fictional period within the Joseon period, the series follows the story of King Lee Heon who has issued a marriage ban after the death of his crown princess seven years ago, and scammer So-rang who claims that she can be possessed by the late crown princess's spirit.

== Cast ==
=== Main ===
- Park Ju-hyun as Ye So-rang
- Kim Young-dae as Lee Heon
- Kim Woo-seok as Lee Shin-won

=== Supporting ===
- Choi Deok-moon as Gwaeng-i
- Jung Bo-min as Hae-young
- Yang Dong-geun as Jo Seong-gyun
- Seo Jin-won as Kwon Rip
- Jeon Jin-oh as Na Sang-ju
- Lee Doo-seok as Kim Ui-jun
- Lee Hyun-geol as Se-jang
- Hwang Jung-min as a court lady
- Kim Min-sang as First Secretary Kim Seol-rok
- Jo Seung-yeon as Lee Jeong-hak
- Park Sun-young as Seo Un-jeong
- Song Ji-woo as Ye Hyun-hee
- Um Hyo-sup as Ye Hyun-ho
- Kim Min-ju as Crown Princess Ahn (Ahn Ja-yeon) / Cha-nyeon
- Cha Mi-kyung as Grand Royal Queen Dowager
- Yoon Jeong-hun as Ja Chun-seok
- Lee Jeong-hyun as Oh Deok-hoon
- Kim Min-seok as Wang-bae
- Hong Si-young as Jung Do-seok

=== Extended ===
- Lee Yoo-kyung as Soo-hyang
- Yoon Tae-in as Bae Yong-bae
- Lee Seung-min as Ji-hwal

=== Special appearances ===
- Park Gyeong-ree as Cho-ran
- Han Sang-jin as Ahn Ji-hyung
- No Min-woo as Ban Ran-tan
- Jo Soo-min as Hwa-yoon

== Production ==
On November 10, 2022, an official from MBC announced that filming for the series was suspended after a staff member tested positive for COVID-19, and was scheduled to resume on November 14.

== Original soundtrack ==
=== Part 1 ===
Released on December 17, 2022
No.	Title	Lyrics	Music	Artist	Length
1.	"How Can I Forget You" (어찌 잊으라 하시오)	Dong Woo-seok	Dong Woo-seok; Yoo Jung-hyun	Seo Eun-kwang (BtoB)	4:35
2.	"How Can I Forget You" (어찌 잊으라 하시오; Inst.)		Dong Woo-seok; Yoo Jung-hyun		4:35
Total length:					9:10

=== Part 2 ===
Released on December 24, 2022
No.	Title	Lyrics	Music	Artist	Length
1.	"Do You Know That" (알고 있나요)	Noah (Galactika)	Athena (Galactika)	Eunha	3:33
2.	"Do You Know That" (알고 있나요; Inst.)		Athena (Galactika)		3:31
Total length:					7:04

=== Part 3 ===
Released on January 7, 2023
No.	Title	Lyrics	Music	Artist	Length
1.	"The Wall" (벽)	GDLO (MonoTree)	GDLO (MonoTree); Lee Gi-chul	Kim Min-seok (MeloMance)	4:02
2.	"The Wall" (벽; Inst.)		GDLO (MonoTree); Lee Gi-chul		4:02
Total length:					8:04

=== Part 4 ===
Released on January 14, 2023
No.	Title	Lyrics	Music	Artist	Length
1.	"Can You Hear Me" (혹시라도 들릴까)	Kim Won	Kim Won; Takey	Lee Ah-young	4:13
2.	"Can You Hear Me" (혹시라도 들릴까; Inst.)		Kim Won; Takey		4:13
Total length:					8:26

== Viewership ==
The Forbidden Marriage : South Korea viewers per episode (thousands)

Season	Episode number												Average
Season	1	2	3	4	5	6	7	8	9	10	11	12	Average
1	798	N/A	616	N/A	675	N/A	917	N/A	858	671	915	905	N/A

Source: Audience measurement performed nationwide by Nielsen Korea.

Average TV viewership ratings
Ep.	Original broadcast date	Average audience share (Nielsen Korea)	
Ep.	Original broadcast date	Nationwide	Seoul
1	December 9, 2022	4.6% (17th)	4.6% (16th)
2	December 10, 2022	3.4% (22nd)	N/A
3	December 16, 2022	3.5% (20th)	3.8% (18th)
4	December 17, 2022	3.0% (25th)	N/A
5	December 23, 2022	4.0% (20th)	3.8% (19th)
6	December 24, 2022	3.1% (22nd)	N/A
7	January 6, 2023 (Note: Episodes 7 and 8 aired on January 6 and 7, 2023, respectively, due to the broadcast of 2022 MBC Drama Awards on December 30, 2022 and 2022 MBC Gayo Daejejeon on December 31, 2022.)	4.9% (14th)	4.5% (16th)
8	January 7, 2023	3.2% (23rd)	N/A
9	January 13, 2023	4.7% (16th)	4.6% (15th)
10	January 14, 2023	3.8% (20th)	3.9% (16th)
11	January 20, 2023	4.8% (14th)	4.9% (12th)
12	January 21, 2023	4.7% (11th)	4.7% (11th)
Average		4.0%	— (Note: Due to some unpublished ratings, the exact average rating is unknown.)
In the table above, the blue numbers represent the lowest ratings and the red numbers represent the highest ratings.; N/A denotes rating that was not released.

== Awards and nominations ==
Award ceremony	Year	Category	Nominee(s)	Result	Ref.
MBC Drama Awards	2022	Excellence Award, Actor in a Miniseries	Kim Young-dae	Won	
MBC Drama Awards	2022	Excellence Award, Actress in a Miniseries	Park Ju-hyun	Won	
MBC Drama Awards	2022	Best Supporting Actor	Yang Dong-geun	Nominated	
MBC Drama Awards	2022	Best Supporting Actress	Hwang Jung-min	Nominated	
MBC Drama Awards	2022	Best New Actor	Kim Woo-seok	Nominated	
MBC Drama Awards	2022	Best New Actress	Kim Min-ju	Won	
MBC Drama Awards	2022	Best Couple Award	Kim Young-dae and Park Ju-hyun	Nominated	
