= Kim Woo-seok (actor) =

South Korean actor (born 1994)

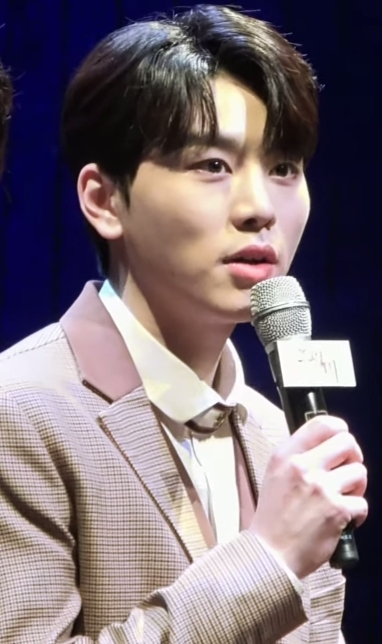
- Kim in April 2021
- Born: March 3, 1994 (age 32); South Korea
- Other name: Kim Woo-suk
- Education: Seoul Institute of the Arts
- Occupation: Actor
- Years active: 2017–present
- Agent: Alien Company
- Relatives: Kim Min-seok (brother)

Korean name
- Hangul: 김우석
- Hanja: 金宇碩
- RR: Gim Useok
- MR: Kim Usŏk

Kim Woo-seok (Korean: 김우석; born March 3, 1994), is a South Korean actor under Alien Company. He made his acting debut in 2017. He is known for his roles in Love Playlist, Rookie Cops, Military Prosecutor Doberman, and The Forbidden Marriage.

== Personal life ==
In January 2023, Kim gave an interview that he might enlist in the mandatory military service this year. Kim enlisted into the military as an active duty soldier on April 4, 2023.

== Philanthropy ==
In January 2023, Kim donated 35 million won to the Social Welfare Community Chest of Love on the 29th and participated in the Hope 2023 Sharing campaign with his older brother Kim Min-seok.

== Filmography ==
=== Television series ===
Key
†	Denotes television productions that have not yet been released

Year	Title	Role	Notes	Ref.
2018	Voice	Jin Seo-yool	Season 2 and 3	
2019	Drama Stage – My Uncle is Audrey Hepburn	Jun-ho	one act-drama	
2020	A Piece of Your Mind	Bae Jin-soo		
2021	Voice 4: Judgement Hour	Jin Seo-yool	Cameo	
2021	Drama Stage – Lucky	Kim Chul-soo	one act-drama	
2022	Rookie Cops	Seo Beom-ju		
2022	Military Prosecutor Doberman	Noh Tae-nam		
2022–2023	The Forbidden Marriage	Lee Shin-won		
2023	Our Blooming Youth	Sim-yeong	Cameo	
2023	Delightfully Deceitful	client	Cameo (episode 1)	
2026	Doctor X: Mafia in White	Park Tae-gyeong		

=== Web series ===
Year	Title	Role	Notes	Ref.
2017	Love Playlist	Choi Seung-hyuk	Season 2–3	
2018	Love Playlist	Choi Seung-hyuk	Season 2–3	
2019	Ghost Vros	Lim Hyun-do		
2021	Scripting Your Destiny	Jung Ba-reum		

== Musical theatre ==
Year	Title	Ref.
2017	Red Book	
2019	Thrill Me	
2020	Phaedra	
2020	Time Between Dog and Cat	
2021	Thrill Me	

== Awards and nominations ==
Name of the award ceremony, year presented, category, nominee of the award, and the result of the nomination
Award ceremony	Year	Category	Nominee / Work	Result	Ref.
MBC Drama Awards	2022	Best New Actor	The Forbidden Marriage	Nominated	
