= Reina Sumi =

Japanese freelance announcer and television personality (born 1990)

- 鷲見 玲奈
- Born: 12 May 1990 (age 35); Gifu, Gifu Prefecture, Japan
- Education: Tokyo Metropolitan University – Department of Urban Education
- Years active: 2013– (as an announcer)
- Agent: Cent. Force
- Television: Current; Ie, tsuite Itte Īdesu ka?; Tsuiseki Live! Sports Watch; Former; Winning Keiba; News Morning Satellite; Ichiya zuke; Neo Sports the documentary!
- Spouse: Unknown (m. 2022)
- Children: 1
- Website: Cent. Force profile

Reina Sumi (鷲見 玲奈, Sumi Reina; born 12 May 1990) is a Japanese freelance announcer and tarento who is a former TV Tokyo announcer.

She was born in Gifu, Gifu Prefecture.

== Biography ==
She attended Kita High School in Gifu Prefecture until her graduation. In March 2013, she graduated from the Tokyo Metropolitan University Department of Business Administration and Urban Liberal Arts Department. She later joined TV Tokyo in April of the same year together with Haruhi Nozawa. Immediately after joining the company she was appointed the joint host of late night programme Ichiya zuke with Nozawa.

In July 2013 she started hosting two programmes, News Morning Satellite and 7 St Live which were both broadcast on Wednesdays.

From January 2015 to December 2016 she was a presenter on Winning Keiba.

== Personal life ==
Her special skill is shigin. She started when she was three years old and belonged to the University of Tokyo Shingin Studies Society at university.

On 12 January 2022, she announced her marriage to a non-celebrity man.

On 31 October 2023, she announced her pregnancy of her first child. On 5 April 2024, she gave birth to their first child.

== Filmography ==
=== Currently appearing programmes ===
Dates	Title	Network	Notes	Ref.
24 Apr 2021 –	Ginza Maid Club presented by TaylorMade	Golf Network		
2 Apr 2022 –	Zoom In!! Saturday	NTV		
3 Apr 2022 –	Donuts Talk	CBC		

=== Others ===
Title	Notes
The Nikkei Densha-ban	Digital Signage

=== Programmes that appeared in the past ===
==== TV Tokyo era ====
Dates	Title	Network	Notes	Ref.
15 Apr 2013 – 28 Mar 2015	Ichiya zuke		Assistant	
3 Jul 2013 –	7 Suta Live		7 Suta Catch Up; Wednesdays	
10 Jul – 25 Sep 2013	News Morning Satellite		Wednesdays	
21 Jul 2013	Akira Ikegami no Sanin-sen Live			
27 Jul 2013	36th Sumidagawa Fireworks Festival			
29 Nov – 1 Dec 2013	Judo Grand Slam Tokyo 2013		Reporter	
	L4 You! Plus		Tokushū Corner, Tuesdays	
12 Jan – 27 Apr 2014	Pinpōn! Reina Channel			
Jan 2014 – Mar 2016	Neo Sports the documentary!		Weekends: Saturdays (5 Apr – 20 Dec 2014); Year-end Special (27 Dec 2014); Weekdays: Tuesdays (7 Jan – 28 Oct 2014), Wednesdays (5 Nov – 24 Dec 2014), Thursdays (8 Jan 2015 – 31 Mar 2016)	
16 Apr – 2 Jul 2014	Ore no Dandism		As herself	
	Tokyo Makita Sports		Occasional appearances	
	Tora no Mon Sports		Occasional appearances	
10 Jan 2015 – 24 Dec 2016	Winning Keiba			
3 Oct 2015 – Mar 2020	Ie, tsuite Itte īdesu ka?			
4 Jan – 24 Jun 2016	Reina Sumi, Oniku: Ginjimasu.			
30 Jan – 26 Mar 2016	Shūkatsu Session Atsushi Tamura no Daigakusei Business Kaigi	BS Japan		
Apr 2016 – Mar 2020	Tsuiseki Live! Sports Watcher		Weekdays: Thursdays (7 Apr 2016 – 30 Mar 2017), Wednesday (5 Apr 2017 – 25 Mar 2020); Weekends: Saturdays (8 Oct 2016 – 28 Mar 2020)	
5 Feb – 26 Mar 2017	Atsushi Tamura no Business Basic			
10 Jul – 10 Sep 2017	Ekitai Gourmet Variety: Tare			
10 Apr 2021 – 18 Mar 2023	Honoo-no Taiiku-kai TV	TBS		
27 Apr – 29 Jun 2021	Triple Element: Uma ni Miryō Sareta-sha-tachi	Fuji TV	MC	

=== Television dramas ===
Year	Title	Network	Role	Notes	Ref.
2021	App de Koi Suru 20 no Joken	NTV	Sakiko Mikami		
2021	Doctor-X: Surgeon Michiko Daimon	TV Asahi	Kaede Hayami	Ep. 4	
2022	DCU	TBS	Chihide Tamai	Ep. 7	
