= The East Palace =

2026 South Korean television series

- Promotional poster
- Hangul: 동궁
- Hanja: 東宮
- RR: Donggung
- MR: Tonggung
- Genre: Dark fantasy; Period drama
- Written by: Kwon So-ra; Seo Jae-won
- Directed by: Choi Jung-kyu
- Starring: Nam Joo-hyuk; Roh Yoon-seo; Cho Seung-woo
- Music by: Jung Se-rin; Kim Joon-seok
- Country of origin: South Korea
- Original language: Korean
- No. of episodes: 8

Production
- Executive producer: Park Joo-yeon
- Producers: Kang Hee-wook; Kim Mi-rae
- Cinematography: Park Jung-hoon
- Editor: Go Ah-mo
- Running time: 46–59 minutes
- Production companies: Showrunners; Imaginus

Original release
- Network: Netflix
- Release: July 17, 2026

The East Palace (Korean: 동궁) is a 2026 South Korean dark fantasy period drama television series co-written by Kwon So-ra and Seo Jae-won, directed by Choi Jung-kyu, and starring Nam Joo-hyuk, Roh Yoon-seo, and Cho Seung-woo. The series follows individuals capable of sensing and slaying ghosts as they uncover hidden secrets within a cursed palace. It was released on Netflix on July 17, 2026.

== Plot ==
In a fictional Joseon dynasty, the royal palace is haunted by wongwi residing in a mirror dimension known as the Realm of Gwi. For thirty years, the royal line of succession is plagued by unexplained deaths among the heirs. King Ju-sang forcibly recruits Gu-cheon, a ghost-slayer capable of projecting his soul into the Realm of Gwi, to be the palace's feng shui master and eliminate the entities targeting the palace. Gu-cheon works alongside Saeng-gang, a low-ranking court lady who can communicate with the dead. Saeng-gang is secretly King Ju-sang's estranged daughter, seeking to investigate her mother's past murder.

Following the poisoning of the Crown Prince, palace rumors attribute the death to a vengeful Pond Spirit—the ghost of an executed court lady. Gu-cheon and Saeng-gang track the entity into the Realm of Gwi, where Gu-cheon destroys it. However, the deaths continue with the illness and demise of Prince Yeongan, King Ju-sang's remaining heir. During their investigation, they are occasionally aided by Ggeomeoksali, a spirit that bound itself to Gu-cheon.

Saeng-gang's investigation reveals that the supernatural curse was fabricated to mask human intrigue. Consort Sukbin, King Ju-sang's mother and Saeng-gang's grandmother, had used the legend of the spirit to poison successive heirs to secure the King Ju-sang's ascension to the throne. Saeng-gang discovers her mother was murdered after assisting in these actions. Furthermore, the late Crown Prince had learned of the plot and assassinated his brothers to ensure his own succession, leading the King to secretly execute him.

Upon his death, the Crown Prince's lingering resentment turns him into an akgwi in the Realm of Gwi, where he spreads a fatal disease throughout the palace. To gain the power necessary to fight the spirit, Gu-cheon seeks out the primordial entity known as the Supreme Gwimae. During the final confrontation, King Ju-sang confesses his remorse to his son's spirit, weakening the Crown Prince's form and allowing Gu-cheon to destroy him.

In the aftermath, Consort Sukbin is banished from the palace, the Queen Dowager retreats to her private residence having lost her sanity, Prince Ik-sang faces investigation regarding his use of shamans, and King Ju-sang remains on the throne, tormented by visions of the victims of his family's political maneuvers. Gu-cheon and Saeng-gang depart the palace together. As they leave, Ggeomeoksali observes that a spectral chain remains attached to Gu-cheon's wrist, implying his bond to the Realm of Gwi is permanent.

== Cast and characters ==
From left to right: Cho Seung-woo, Roh Yoon-seo and Nam Joo-hyuk

=== Main ===
- Nam Joo-hyuk as Gu-cheon
  - Choi Ye-chan as young Gu-cheon

A spirit-slayer capable of projecting his soul into the Realm of Gwi. Gu-cheon acquired his supernatural abilities as a child after surviving a drowning accident that killed his mother. While living with who he called a "false monk", he is forcefully taken to the palace by King Ju-sang to be the palace's fung shui master and eliminate an entity haunting the royal family and lift a thirty-year curse under threat of execution should he fail while also not allowing him to leave the palace grounds. To enter the spirit world, he submerges himself into the palace pond with a rope tied around his neck. Though initially motivated only by his own survival, he grows invested in the mission after learning that his companion, Saeng-gang, is tied to the spirit's history.

- Roh Yoon-seo as Saeng-gang
  - Choi So-yul as young Saeng-gang

A court lady who possesses the ability to hear the voices of the dead. She is assigned by the King to serve as Gu-cheon's guide during the search for the pond spirit while secretly monitoring his actions. It would later be revealed that Saeng-gang is King Ju-sang's estranged daughter.

- Cho Seung-woo as the King Ju-sang
  - Moon Woo-jin as young King Ju-sang

The ruler of Joseon, born to a royal concubine. Publicly, Ju-sang dismisses rumors regarding the supernatural deaths in the East Palace as mere superstition. Privately, he summons a ghost-slayer and a spirit-communicating court lady, who is also his estranged daughter, to investigate and lift the curse affecting his heirs.

=== Supporting ===
- Jang Young-nam as the Queen dowager

King Ju-sang's lae widow who holds royal legitimacy over the line of succession due to the King being born to a low-ranking concubine. Driven to preserve the royal bloodline and cover up past misdeeds, she attempts to appease the pond spirit while clashing with the King over the continuous deaths of the royal princes.

- Hwang Young-hee as Consort Sukbin, King Ju-sang's mother
- Hong Seo-jun as Chief Eunuch Kim, the chief of the palace guards
- Tae In-ho as Prince Ik-sang, King Ju-sang's cousin
- Lee Hong-nae as Shaman Park-soo
- Choi Hyuk-joo as Lady Jang, the boss of King Ju-sang's court ladies
- Choi Jae-rim as the royal guard
- Park Su-yeon as the Queen consort
- Shim Hye-rim as Royal Concubine Yoon
- Noh I-jin as Royal Concubine Han
  - Park Ji-yul as young Han

Saeng-gang's deceased mother

- Choi Bum-ho as a monk
- Kim Hyun-joon as the Chief Royal Secretary
- Min Eung-sik as the Second State Councilor
- Won Geun-hee as the Chief State Councilor
- Seo Gwang-Jae as the Third State Councilor
- Moon Chang-wan as the Minister of Rites
- Zhang Ui-don as the Minister of Finance
- Kim Si-eun as Gu-cheon's deceased mother
- Rayun as Consort Sukbin's senior court lady
- Lee Ho-cheol as the royal court physician
- Kim Ji-yul as Ji-yul, a young court lady. In the English dub, Ji-yul is voiced by Erin Choi.
- Jo Dan as Prince Yeong-an
- Lee Jae-joon as Prince In-ha, Ik-sang's son
- Lee Ha-eon as a young eunuch

=== Special appearances ===
- Kwak Dong-yeon as the Crown Prince, the son of King Ju-sang who returns as a ghost
- Hong Su-zu as the favored court lady

== Episodes ==
No.	Title	Directed by	Written by	Original release date
1	"Episode 1"	Choi Jung-kyu	Kwon So-ra; Seo Jae-won	July 17, 2026
2	"Episode 2"	Choi Jung-kyu	Kwon So-ra; Seo Jae-won	July 17, 2026
3	"Episode 3"	Choi Jung-kyu	Kwon So-ra; Seo Jae-won	July 17, 2026
4	"Episode 4"	Choi Jung-kyu	Kwon So-ra; Seo Jae-won	July 17, 2026
5	"Episode 5"	Choi Jung-kyu	Kwon So-ra; Seo Jae-won	July 17, 2026
6	"Episode 6"	Choi Jung-kyu	Kwon So-ra; Seo Jae-won	July 17, 2026
7	"Episode 7"	Choi Jung-kyu	Kwon So-ra; Seo Jae-won	July 17, 2026
8	"Episode 8"	Choi Jung-kyu	Kwon So-ra; Seo Jae-won	July 17, 2026

== Production ==
=== Development ===
The dark fantasy period drama series is directed by Choi Jung-kyu, who helmed The Devil Judge (2021), written by screenwriter duo Kwon So-ra and Seo Jae-won, who both penned The Guest (2018) and Bulgasal: Immortal Souls (2021–2022), and produced jointly by Showrunners and Imaginus.

=== Casting ===
In June 2024, SPOTV News reported that Nam Joo-hyuk and Roh Yoon-seo were cast to star in the series. This project marks Nam's first acting role following his military discharge in September 2024, and Roh's first venture into the dark fantasy genre. Three months later, Ilgan Sports reported that Cho Seung-woo had joined the cast, marking his first appearance in a series produced specifically for a global streaming platform. By December 2024, Netflix confirmed the appearances of the three actors.

=== Filming ===
Principal photography began in December 2024. On December 21, a major fire occurred at the series' filming location in Yeoncheon County, Gyeonggi Province, resulting in the total destruction of a 3,655-square-meter production facility. Although no casualties were reported, the blaze destroyed a primary set building and significant amounts of technical equipment, including specialized lighting gear. Police and fire officials launched an investigation immediately following the incident to determine the cause of the fire.

== Release ==
The East Palace was first unveiled in January 2026, as part of Netflix's massive slate of scripted series, reality shows, live events and sports on its 2026 "Next on Netflix" release. Later that month, it was announced for a third quarter of 2026 release window. By June 2026, Netflix confirmed that the series is scheduled to premiere on July 17.

== Reception ==
The series appeared in the top 10 list on Netflix in 69 countries, and accumulated 8.1 million viewing hours in two weeks. The series received positive reviews for its "dazzling visuals" and "unique worldview". The Kkeomeoksari creature that follows the protagonist around earned the nickname "Joseon Groot" among fans of the series. On the other hand, South China Morning Post criticised its "lack of originality" and "convoluted mythmaking". RogerEbert.com praises its "heightened, imaginative, animated energy", the solid CGI work, but notes that The East Palace starts losing luster mid-way, lacking logic in its surprise twists, and the pace becomes disrupted. Nevertheless, the critic concludes that the series "makes for a hauntingly fun binge".
