= Doctor X: Mafia in White =

2026 South Korean television series

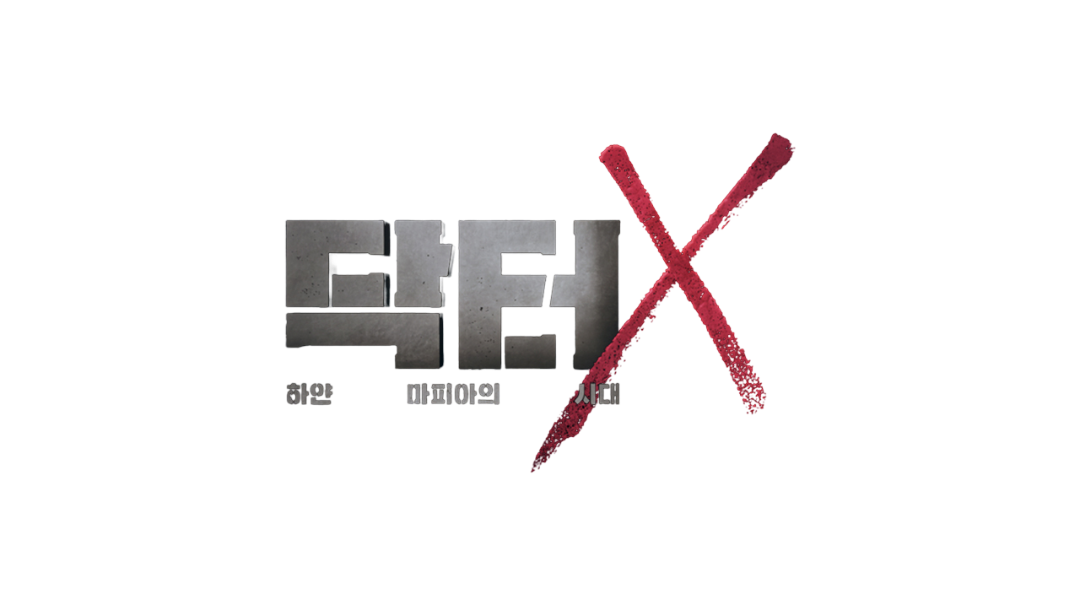
- Also known as: Doctor X
- Hangul: 닥터X: 하얀 마피아의 시대
- Lit.: Doctor X: Age of the White Mafia
- RR: Dakteo X: hayan mapiaui sidae
- MR: Takt'ŏ X: hayan map'iaŭi sidae
- Genre: Medical; Noir; Dark comedy
- Based on: TV Asahi's Doctor-X: Surgeon Michiko Daimon
- Written by: Pyeon Seong-geun
- Directed by: Lee Jung-rim
- Starring: Kim Ji-won; Lee Jung-eun; Son Hyun-joo; Kim Woo-seok; Lee Jin-hee
- Music by: Primary
- Country of origin: South Korea
- Original language: Korean
- No. of episodes: 12

Production
- Executive producers: Hong Sung-chang; Jang Kyung-ik; Yoo Sang-won; Cho Ah-ra; Hwang Gi-yong; Han Suk-won; Lee Ok-gyu; Lee Gwang-soon
- Producers: Lee Jae-woo; Yoon Geon-hee
- Cinematography: Choi Sang-muk; Oh Joon-pyo
- Editors: Kim Sang-hee; Han Yi-seul
- Running time: 60 minutes
- Production companies: Studio S; Studio Dragon; HighZium Studio

Original release
- Network: SBS TV
- Release: October 9 – November 14, 2026

Doctor X: Mafia in White (Korean: 닥터X: 하얀 마피아의 시대) is a 2026 South Korean medical noir television series written by Pyeon Seong-geun, directed by Lee Jung-rim, and starring Kim Ji-won, Lee Jung-eun, Son Hyun-joo, and Kim Woo-seok. Based on TV Asahi's Doctor-X: Surgeon Michiko Daimon, the series depicts a surgeon who proves her worth purely through her skill, as she operates on corrupt organizations riddled with injustice. It aired on SBS TV from October 9, to November 14, 2026, every Friday and Saturday at 21:50 (KST). It is also available for streaming on Netflix.

== Premise ==
Gye Su-jeong is a surgeon who establishes her value through her surgical abilities in a world where corruption and bureaucracy rule the medical system. Often referred to as the "mad dog of the operating room", she takes on seemingly insurmountable cases and reveals the corruption at the esteemed Guseo University Seonam Medical Center.

== Cast and characters ==
=== Main ===
- Kim Ji-won as Gye Su-jeong / Doctor X

A genius surgeon who exiled herself into a dark past. Dispatched by Director Jang herself to fill the staff shortage at Guseo University Seonam Medical Center (GUMC), she focuses exclusively on patient care.

- Lee Jung-eun as Jang Hui-suk

Director of Jang's Locum Tenens Agency. Although not related by blood, she is Su-jeong's aunt and a steadfast supporter sharing her past tragedy.

- Son Hyun-joo as Bu Seung-kwon

Director of GUMC. Once desiring only to be a doctor, he compromised within a corrupt system to become director and save the collapsing hospital.

- Kim Woo-seok as Park Tae-gyeong

A surgical intern at GUMC with a warm disposition and deep empathy. Believing Su-jeong will change his life, he holds firm to the belief that kindness will prevail.

- Lee Jin-hee as Jo Won-jin / Kim Won-jin

An anesthesiology professor at GUMC. Cynical yet exceptionally skilled, she serves as a capable commander who maintains composure in any operating room.

=== Supporting ===
Guseo University Seonam Medical Center staff

- Kim Young-min as Do Yun-sik

A general surgery professor at GUMC who prioritizes research and papers. His dream is to support his mentor Seung-kwon and establish a surgical big data center.

- Lee Sung-wook as Bae Heung-gon

A professor at GUMC, holding double board certifications in general and neurosurgery. Self-proclaimed "God of laparoscopy" and nicknamed "Angry Heung-gon", he remains fiercely loyal to the institution.

- Kwon Seung-woo as Ma Seong-gyu

A senior resident at GUMC. Initially aiming just to endure for a professorship, he has genuinely grown to want to be a surgeon through his training.

- Heo Joon-seok as Kim Seong-jin

An emergency medicine professor at GUMC. Meddlesome yet warm-hearted, he views saving lives as his true vocation and destiny.

- Koo See-yeon as Go Jae-seon

A nurse at GUMC.

- Han Jee-won as Han Ju-hye

A nurse at GUMC.

Personnel of Director Jang's Locum Tenens Agency

- Choi Deok-moon as Yang Eun-gu

A Traditional Korean medicine doctor at the agency with legendary hands from treating North Korean elites. He serves as a steadfast mentor to Su-jeong and Hee-suk.

- Kim Jung-young as Yu Mi-gyeong

A doctor at the agency and former renowned European cancer specialist, carrying the lingering pain of losing her husband.

People around Guseo University Seonam Medical Center

- Kim Young-ah as Lee Seon-ae

Head of the management team at GUMC. Diligent and resolute in protecting her workplace, she struggles inwardly as the hospital falters.

- Choi Kwang-il as Gu Bon-pyeong

Chairman of the board at GUMC and leader of the Magnolia Association, obsessed with the power yielded by controlling human lives.

- Jung Seok-yong as Kim Chang-su

A core member of the Magnolia Association and president of the Seonam City Medical Association, harboring deep resentment over operating room surveillance cameras.

- Kim Kyung-min as Im Ho-seok

A core member of the Magnolia Association and the mayor of Seonam City. Having transitioned from a show doctor to politics, he harbors greater political ambitions.

- Kim Jong-gu as Kim Myeong-seop

A core member of the Magnolia Association facing retirement, harboring deep ambition and resentment while failing to recognize his outdated surgical methods.

=== Others ===
- Choi Jong-ryul as Seo Byeong-gyu

An old patient with gallbladder cancer.

- Min Kyung-ok as Byeong-gu's wife
- Park Ok-chool as Ju-hui's mother who is physically disabled
- Kim Ki-cheon as Park Gwang-cheol

A VIP patient with pancreatic cancer.

- Yuna as Lee Ju-hui

A young patient with a type 1 diabetes and pancreatoblastoma.

=== Special appearances ===
- Jang Seung-jo as Na Dae-il
- Jeon Gook-hwan as Kim Seung-hyo

An old man with a past connected to Su-jeong. He maintains a facade as a kind-hearted doctor, but in reality, he has sexually abused several children (two of whom are Tae-gyeong and Baraka) and he is also Won-jin's father.

== Production ==
=== Development ===
The series is based on TV Asahi's Doctor-X: Surgeon Michiko Daimon series (2012–2021), produced by Studio Dragon, Studio S, and HighZium Studio, directed by Lee Jung-rim, who helmed VIP (2019), Revenant (2023), and As You Stood By (2025), and written by Pyeon Seong-geun.

=== Casting ===
In February 2025, Kim Ji-won was reportedly cast to lead the series. The following seven months, Lee Jung-eun, Kim Woo-seok, and Son Hyun-joo were reportedly cast as the other lead actors. In November 2025, the four actors confirmed their appearances.

=== Filming ===
Principal photography began on December 4, 2025.

== Release ==
Doctor X: Mafia in White was scheduled to air on SBS TV's Friday and Saturday timeslot in 2026. The series' first teaser was unveiled at the 2025 SBS Drama Awards and confirmed for an October release. By August 2026, the series was confirmed to premiere on October 9, airing at 21:50 (KST). It is also available for streaming on Netflix globally.

== Viewership ==
Doctor X: Mafia in White : South Korea viewers per episode (millions)

Season	Episode number												Average
Season	1	2	3	4	5	6	7	8	9	10	11	12	Average
1	2.227	2.847	3.081	3.609	3.463	3.964	3.186	3.088	3.034	3.617	2.844	2.982	3.162

Source: Audience measurement performed nationwide by Nielsen Korea.

Average TV viewership ratings
Ep.	Original broadcast date	Average audience share (Nielsen Korea)	
Ep.	Original broadcast date	Nationwide	Seoul
1	October 9, 2026	11.4% (1st)	11.2% (1st)
2	October 10, 2026	14.9% (1st)	14.7% (1st)
3	October 16, 2026	15.1% (1st)	14.9% (1st)
4	October 17, 2026	18.5% (1st)	18.4% (1st)
5	October 23, 2026	17.5% (1st)	17.0% (1st)
6	October 24, 2026	19.5% (1st)	19.2% (1st)
7	October 30, 2026	16.5% (1st)	15.8% (1st)
8	October 31, 2026	15.6% (1st)	15.1% (1st)
9	November 6, 2026	15.3% (1st)	15.3% (1st)
10	November 7, 2026	17.7% (1st)	17.7% (1st)
11	November 13, 2026	14.5% (1st)	13.9% (1st)
12	November 14, 2026	15.2% (1st)	14.5% (1st)
Average		16.0%	15.6%
In the table above, the blue numbers represent the lowest ratings and the red numbers represent the highest ratings.
