= Roh Yoon-seo =

South Korean actress (born 2000)

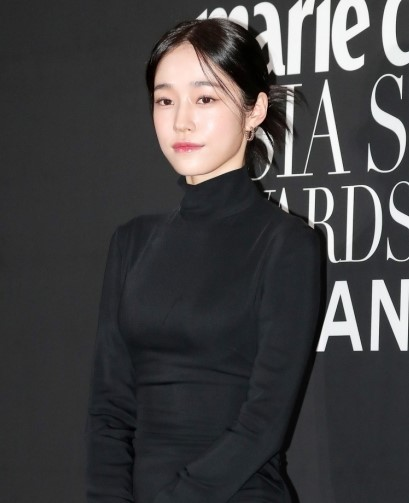
- Roh at Marie Claire Asia Star Awards, October 2022
- Born: January 25, 2000 (age 26); Seoul, South Korea
- Education: Ewha Womans University (Fine Arts)
- Occupations: Actress; model
- Years active: 2018–present
- Agent: MAA Korea

Korean name
- Hangul: 노윤서
- RR: No Yunseo
- MR: No Yunsŏ

Roh Yoon-seo (Korean: 노윤서; born January 25, 2000) is a South Korean actress and model. She is best known for her roles in the television series Our Blues (2022) and Crash Course in Romance (2023), as well as the films 20th Century Girl (2022) and Hear Me: Our Summer (2024). Her roles in Crash Course in Romance and Hear Me: Our Summer earned her multiple Best New Actress awards, and following the latter's success, she has been given the monicker "Nation's First Love".

== Education ==
Roh graduated in 2023 from Ewha Womans University, where she majored in Fine Arts. Roh was formerly educated at Jamjeon Elementary School, Jungshin Girls' Middle School, and Sunhwa Arts School.

== Career ==
Roh started out her career as a model for cosmetic products advertisements in 2018, including Allure Korea.

Roh made her acting debut in 2022, as she was cast as Bang Yeong-ju, a pregnant high school student in the popular tvN drama Our Blues. Despite the controversy surrounding the drama's subplot of teenage pregnancy, Roh nonetheless garnered attention from the audiences for her portrayal and her emotional acting, including the portrayal of the emotional struggles behind teenage pregnancy. From this debut role, Roh demonstrated stable and gifted acting skills for a rookie, which won the hearts of the audience.

Later the same year, Roh starred in the Netflix film 20th Century Girl. Within three days of its release, the film debuted at No. 2 on Netflix's global chart of Top 10 non-English language film category for the week of its release, with eight million hours viewed, as well as positive reception to the film's plot.

In 2023, Roh starred in tvN's television series Crash Course in Romance, where she was awarded Best New Actress at the 59th Baeksang Arts Awards for her performance.

== Philanthropy ==
In July 2023, Roh participated in a 10 million won donation to the 2023 Ice Bucket Challenge.

In March 2025, Roh donated 10 million won through the Hope Bridge National Disaster Relief Association to help with recovery efforts from wildfires that have occurred in the Ulsan, Gyeongbuk, and Gyeongnam regions.

== Filmography ==
=== Film ===
Key
†	Denotes films that have not yet been released

Year	Title	Role	Ref.
2022	20th Century Girl	Yeon-du	
2024	Hear Me: Our Summer	Seo Yeo-reum	
2026	White Blast		

=== Television series ===
Key
†	Denotes television productions that have not yet been released

Year	Title	Role	Notes	Ref.
2022	Our Blues	Bang Yeong-ju		
2023	Crash Course in Romance	Nam Hae-yi		
2023	Black Knight	Seul-ah		
2024	Love Next Door	Herself	Cameo	
2024	The Frog	Jeon Eui-seon	Cameo	
2026	The East Palace	Saeng-gang		

=== Music video appearances ===
Year	Song Title	Artist	Ref.
2022	"Freak" (괴짜)	Zico	
2026	"Slow It Down"	Felix	

== Accolades ==
=== Awards and nominations ===
Name of the award ceremony, year presented, category, nominee(s) of the award, and the result of the nomination
Award	Year	Category	Nominee(s)	Result	Ref.
APAN Star Awards	2022	Best New Actress	Our Blues	Nominated	
Baeksang Arts Awards	2023	Best New Actress – Television	Crash Course in Romance	Won	
Baeksang Arts Awards	2025	Best New Actress – Film	Hear Me: Our Summer	Won	
Blue Dragon Film Awards	2025	Best New Actress	Hear Me: Our Summer	Nominated	
Brand Customer Loyalty Awards	2023	Female Actress Rookie	Crash Course in Romance	Won	
Busan International Film Festival with Marie Claire Asia Star Awards	2022	Rising Star Award	Our Blues	Won	

=== Listicles ===
Name of publisher, year listed, name of listicle, and placement
Publisher	Year	Listicle	Placement	Ref.
Cine21	2021	New Actress to watch out for in 2022	6th (Note: Tied with Park Eun-bin, Moon Ga-young, Keum Sae-rok, Joo Hyun-young, Park Gyu-young, Lee Soo-kyung, Go Min-si, Gong Seung-yeon, Lee Se-young, IU, Shin Hyun-been, Park Ji-hu, Han So-hee, Jung Ji-so, Bang Min-ah, Jeon Jong-seo, Roh Jeong-eui)	
Cine21	2023	Top 5 New Actresses to Watch in 2023	3rd	
