= Doctor-X: Surgeon Michiko Daimon =

- ドクターX〜外科医・大門未知子〜
- Genre: Medical drama; Comedy; Japanese television drama
- Written by: Miho Nakazono; Aya Takei; Masato Hayashi; Toshio Terada; Takashi Kosaka; Manabu Uda
- Directed by: Naomi Tamura; Hayato Yamada; Hidetoshi Matsuda
- Starring: Ryoko Yonekura
- Narrated by: Tomorowo Taguchi
- Composer: Kan Sawada
- Country of origin: Japan
- Original language: Japanese
- No. of seasons: 7
- No. of episodes: 69 + 1 special

Production
- Producer: Seiko Uchiyama
- Production locations: {{Plainlist: Japan; New York City; }}
- Running time: 54 minutes
- Production companies: TV Asahi; The Works Co., Ltd.

Original release
- Release: 18 October 2012 – 16 December 2021

Related
- Doctor-Y: Surgeon Hideki Kaji; Doctor X: Mafia in White

Doctor-X: Surgeon Michiko Daimon (ドクターX〜外科医・大門未知子〜) is a Japanese medical drama that premiered in October 2012 on TV Asahi. It stars Japanese actress Ryoko Yonekura.

The series ran for seven seasons until December 2021, with a total of 69 episodes and one special. It is one of the longest-running medical dramas on Japanese television, notable for its consistent high ratings and enduring popularity throughout its broadcast period.

A continuation, Doctor-X: The Movie, was released in 2024.

== Plot ==
The show follows Daimon Michiko, a freelance surgeon who works at university hospitals in Japan. Also known as Doctor-X, Daimon is introduced at new hospitals by walking into surgery staff planning review sessions, where the conditions of her work are established. She is depicted as challenging a medical system in crisis, which follows the laws of the jungle.

Her trademark line is "I never fail", and she is willing to do high risk surgeries that other surgeons are not, sending those patients elsewhere when they are deemed non-operable. Her success in treating high risk patients is a result of always putting the patient first, prioritizing their health above performing medical firsts or innovative techniques, and to adapt the right surgical methods on the spot when needed. This practice often puts her into conflict with other doctors. Beyond being a surgeon, she also served as a vet, combat surgeon and resort doctor. Daimon is supported by her manager Akira Kanbara and anesthesiologist Hiromi Jōnouchi.

=== First season ===
Daimon Michiko, a lone wolf freelance surgeon who hates authority and groups, joins Teito III University Hospital, where her way of practicing results in conflict with hospital administrators.

=== Second season ===
Daimon continues her practice of doing risky surgeries to benefit patients. This practice continues to create conflict with hospital administrators.

=== Third season ===
A vicious political struggle is underway at Japan's National Advanced Medical Center (NAMC) between the East's "Totei University Hospital" and the West's "Seikyo University Hospital". Daimon is brought in to try to minimize these conflicts and bring a more patient-focused approach.

=== Fourth season ===
Daimon returns in the fourth season to the Totei University Hospital. Shigekatsu Hiruma serves as the primary adversary for Daimon.

=== Fifth season ===
Daimon returns to Totei University Hospital to assist in bringing a more patient-driven approach. Her main antagonist is the Japan Doctor's Club chairman.

=== Sixth season ===
Daimon clashes with Totei University Hospital's new administrator Nicholas Tange, (a 2nd generation Japanese-Brazilian, a.k.a. "The Vulture"), whose aggressive cost-cutting threatens the integrity of the hospital.

=== Seventh season ===
Coming back from New Zealand, Dr. Daimon returns to Tōtei university hospital amidst the COVID-19 pandemic. The internal medicine department is now a priority over surgery with Dr. Hachisuka leading it.

== Cast ==
The show stars Ryōko Yonekura as Doctor-X – Daimon Michiko. Yonekura was a former fashion model who had performed as the first Roxie Hart in the Japanese theater production of Chicago in 2008. After learning English, Yonekura made her Broadway debut in the same role in 2012 and reprised it in 2017. The actress has said that she overuses her character's catchphrase, “私、失敗しないので" (“I never fail") in her personal life. Yonekura also sees the character as a lighter, less stressed and more free reflection of herself.

Shirō Itō and Ittoku Kishibe were both veteran actors who joined the cast for the first season.

Yuki Uchida appears in all 7 seasons playing Hiromi Jonouchi, an anesthesiologist who works for the same agency as Michiko Daimon.

Ryōko Yonekura, Takeshi Kitano and Kei Inoo all appeared in the special. Takeshi Kitano returned to acting after a two-year absence for his role in the special. He had taken time off to work behind the camera. Michiko Tanaka was also a regular in the fourth season, playing the secretary of the hospital director. Tanaka was nervous during the whole three months of filming for the season because she had to work with Toshiyuki Nishida.

The fourth season also starred Toshiyuki Nishida as Shigekatsu Hiruma. He had previously appeared in Nobunaga Concerto and State of Union.

Yonekura returned for the fourth season despite an earlier intention not to do so. During the break between seasons, Yonekura had starred in the Broadway production of Chicago. The actress and former model gave as her reason for previously declining to appear in the fourth season that she had not had an opportunity to star in the same TV series for an extended run and she never had the confidence to respond to people’s expectations. However, because it was a role she really liked, and she felt able to reprise the role. Traditionally, dramas run for only one season in Japan.

Masao Kusakari stars in the fifth season.

Character	Portrayed by	Series							
Character	Portrayed by	1	2	3	SP	4	5	6	7
Michiko Daimon	Ryoko Yonekura	Main	Main	Main	Main	Main	Main	Main	Main
Akira Kanbara	Ittoku Kishibe	Main	Main	Main	Main	Main	Main	Main	Main
Hiromi Jonouchi	Yuki Uchida	Main	Main	Main	Main	Main	Main	Main	Main
Hideki Kaji	Masanobu Katsumura	Main	Guest	Main	Recurring	Main	Guest	Main	Main
Mamoru Hara	Kosuke Suzuki	Main	Guest	Recurring	Recurring	Recurring	Recurring	Recurring	Recurring
Hikaru Morimoto	Kei Tanaka	Main					Recurring		Guest
Takashi Torii	Yasunori Danta	Recurring					Recurring		
Ryunosuke Busujima	Shiro Ito	Main	Guest	Guest					
Shinobu Kondo	Naohito Fujiki		Main						
Takashi Ebina	Kenichi Endo		Recurring	Main	Recurring	Guest	Main	Main	Main
Shigekatsu Hiruma	Toshiyuki Nishida		Main	Guest	Recurring	Main	Main	Main	Main
Yoshihito Tendo	Kin'ya Kitaōji			Main					
Junko Shiraki	Atsuko Takahata			Main					Guest
Ben Casey		Main	Main	Main	Main	Main	Main	Main	Main
Gannon									Main

=== Main cast ===
- Ryoko Yonekura as Michiko Daimon (Doctor-X) – A freelance surgeon who takes on the most difficult operations using unorthodox and dangerous methods. Her catchphrase is "I never fail."
- Ittoku Kishibe as Akira Kanbara (Melon-Ojisan) – The owner of Kanbara Medical Referral Agency and a former surgeon. Also another Doctor-X who was stripped of his medical License in Cuba. Known for his exorbitant prices and giving melons as gifts, given the nickname of Melon-Ojisan by Hiruma Shigekatsu.
- Yuki Uchida as Hiromi Jonouchi – A anaesthetist who originally worked Full-Time in Season One. Resigned in the final episode and joined Kanbara Medical Referral Agency. She is a single mother, her ex husband is also a doctor who appeared in the series.
- Masanobu Katsumura as Hideki Kaji – One of the surgeons working for the University Hospital. He is known for his expertise in laparoscopy. Dr. Kaji calls Dr. Daimon a demon due to how she doesn't follow status quo. This character is the only one with a spin-off in the series "Doctor-Y".
- Kosuke Suzuki as Mamoru Hara – One of three recurring surgeons working for the University. Dr. Daimon calls him "Kin-chan".
- Kenichi Endo as Takashi Ebina – One of the surgeons of Tōtei University Hospital, he is portrayed as someone who is weak to authority. He tries to be on Director Hiruma's good side by following his orders.
- Toshiyuki Nishida as Shigekatsu Hiruma – One of the main antagonists of the series. In the series, he has been promoted, demoted, holding the position of hospital director or head of surgery. He tries to gain power by controlling top staff, taking advantage of Michiko's assignments, or through corrupt means. He also has tons of mistresses in and outside of the hospital.
- Ben Casey - the legendary, custom-sweater-wearing office cat of the Kanbara Medical Agency. Named after the classic 1960s TV doctor, this iconic orange-and-white tabby acts as the ultimate emotional support for Michiko Daimon and Akira Kanbara, completely ignoring hospital politics in favor of napping on desks and stealing scenes during high-stakes contract negotiations.

=== Secondary Cast ===
- Kei Tanaka as Hikaru Morimoto – Appearances: Seasons 1, 5 and 7 - A surgeon who left at the end of Season One to hone his skills overseas. In the premiere of Season 5, he returned to work in a rural area, but was transferred back to the main hospital by Shimura Madoka. In season 7 he returns briefly in episode 7 to Tōtei but now as a medical "Extuber" helping to provide good publicity.
- Shiro Ito as Ryunosuke Busujima – Appearances: Seasons 1, 2 and 3 - The Director of the Hospital in Season One until he was fired due to underhand tactics by Hiruma Shigekatsu. In Season Two, he re-appeared to help Daimon Michiko in fulfilling her wish to operate on a patient. In Season Three, he appeared in the premiere and was rescued from an explosion on a cruise by Daimon.
- Yasunori Danta as Takashi Torii – Appearances: Seasons 1 and 5 - A professor serving as the Director of the Second Surgery Department at Teito III University Hospital in season 1. His hope for becoming the hospital's director was shattered when the former director fell ill and lost influence. In episode 6, he was diagnosed with cancer but concealed his diagnosis to participate in the upcoming academic conference. He fainted on the day of departure and was operated by Daimon in the season finale. He returned in season 5 after his recovery and served as the Deputy Director of the Surgery Department at Totei University Hospital. His personality changed due to his illness, prioritizing his patients over his academic work. He also lost his courage, following all of Hiruma's orders.
- Atsuko Takahata as Junko Shiraki – Appearances: Seasons 3 and 7 - The head nurse at the NAMC in season 3. She takes pride in her work and always gives her all. She expects high standards from her nurses and is protective of them. She leads her nurses as an independent faction, shielding them from the center's political struggles. In season 7, she is shown to be working at a nurse themed hostess bar.

==== Season 2 ====
Naohito Fujiki as Shinobu Kondo – Surgical assistant to Dr. Daimon.

==== Season 3 ====
- Kin'ya Kitaōji as Yoshihito Tendo – A former surgeon and current council member of the NAMC. He became the center's new director after Tetsuya Kurobe's dismissal in episode 1. His goal is to establish the Medical Industry Group to foster medical innovation for treating patients. He utilizes Michiko's successful operations to grow his influence to establish the group. He became the group's chairman after its establishment near the end of the season, but was promptly dismissed by the Cabinet of Japan due to political interference. After his dismissal, he realizes his negligence of the patients in front of him and vows to return as a surgeon.

==== Season 7 ====
- Mansai Nomura as Ryutaro Hachisuka – A former surgeon under Hiruma, now practicing internal medicine. He is the Director of internal medicine & Acting Director of the hospital when season 7 starts. He has a crush on Daimon Michiko, he also got his surgery done by her at the final episode.
- Gannon - the adorable lookalike kitten of Ben Casey who joins the drama in Season 7 to continue the agency's feline dynasty. Named after Dr. Joe Gannon in American television series Medical Center, this tiny ball of fluff instantly inherits his father's talent for melting hearts, doubling the cuteness on screen as he learns the ropes of office life and afternoon naps.

=== Guest appearances ===
==== Season one ====
- Mansaku Fuwa as Jiro Ichinose, the president of Ichinose rubber company (Episode 1)
- Miyako Yamaguchi as Namiko Ichinose, Jiro's wife (Episode 1)
- Raita Ryū as Shigeru Kubo, Totei University Hospital director (Episode 1)
- Hirofumi Arai as Satoru Yasuda (Episode 2)
- Midoriko Kimura as Mitsuyo Yasuda, Satoru's wife (Episode 2)
- Kazuaki Hankai as Noboru Nikaidō, the president of Nikaidō Publishing company (Episode 2)
- Kami Hiraiwa as Mitsue Hanayama, a food blogger (Episode 3)
- Shinsō Nakamaru as Tadashi Honda, Mitsue's lawyer (Episode 3)
- Shingo Tsurumi as Atsushi Yotsuya, a foreign fund manager (Episode 4)
- Tamao Akae as Mariko Yoshinaga, The Super Doctors program's host (Episode 4)
- Akari Ninomiya as Saki Gokita (Episode 5)
- Naomasa Musaka as Motohiko Rokusaka (Episode 6)
- Kayoko Kishimoto as Nanako Torii, Takashi Torii's wife (Episode 7–8)
- Koji Yamamoto as Takuya Hijikata (Episode 7–8)
- Kanji Tsuda as Ryo Yagi, a gossip magazine black journalist (Episode 8)

==== Season two ====
- Minori Terada as Kin'ya Ninomiya, the president of Ninomiya Real Estate company (Episode 2)
- Mirai Yamamoto as Torako Mimura (Episode 3)
- Mayumi Myosei as Mika Kanie (Episode 3)
- Yumiko Shaku as Rumiko Shijō, the owner of Nakazono hostess bar in Ginza (Episode 4)
- Hiroshi Ookochi as Ichirō Gomi (Episode 5)
- Fuka Koshiba as Kaori Gomi, Ichiro's daughter (Episode 5)
- Tetsuya Bessho as Mitsuhiko Kusakabe (Episode 5)
- Shigeru Izumiya as Rokusuke Kondo, Shinobu's father (Episode 6)
- Yumi Shirakawa as Hisae Asai, a Health Policy Bureau of Ministry of Health, Labour and Welfare (Episode 7)
- Miyu Honda as Kurumi Murata (Episode 8–9)
- Kaoru Okunuki as Mitsuyo Murata, Kurumi's mother (Episode 8–9)
- Kenichi Kobayashi as Yasaku Takemoto, a fisherman (Episode 8)

==== Season three ====
- Naoko Otani as Haruko Busujima, Ryonosuke Busujima's wife (Episode 1)
- Romeo Thomas as Bob First, a cruise crew's son (Episode 1)
- Akira Nakao as Tetsuya Kurobe, the director of National Advance Medical Center (Episode 1)
- Moto Fuyuki as Jirō Tsukiji, a restaurant owner (Episode 1–2)
- Naoki Matayoshi as Shōji Kazama (Episode 2)
- Seita Hosokawa as Kazuya Tsukiji, Jirō's son (Episode 2)
- Shima Iwashita as Masae Mihara, the chief of Japan Nurses Federation (Episode 3)
- Ayaka Morita as Nanako Mihara, Masae's granddaughter (Episode 3)
- Takashi Matsuo as Hiroshi Yomo, a freelance journalist (Episode 4)
- Walter Roberts as Albert Savarotti (Episode 4)
- Seiichirō Uchida as Keiichirō Iiyama, the program host (Episode 4)
- Jun Inoue as Shingo Tanaka (Episode 5)
- Hiroto Yoshimitsu as Hirohisa Igarashi (Episode 5)
- Noboru Kaneko as Takashi Rokko, an IT company director and Hiromi Jonouchi's high school classmate (Episode 6)
- Kyūsaku Shimada as Tatsuya Ichikawa, a Tokyo district prosecutor (Episode 6)
- Mikito Nakawaki as Masakazu Uehara, a Tokyo district prosecutor (Episode 6)
- Kei Sunaga as Takehiro Ōizumi, the Minister of Health, Labour and Welfare (Episode 6)
- Ginpunchō as Nanami Kotozuka (Episode 7)
- Yukiko Takabayashi as Shizuko Suita (Episode 7)
- Seiran Kobayashi as Chihiro Yada (Episode 8)
- Keiko Horiuchi as Kasumi Yada, Chihiro's mother (Episode 8)
- Kazutaka Ishii as Kunio Yada, Chihiro's father (Episode 8)
- Nanao as Maya Kokonoe, a model (Episode 9)
- Judy Ongg as Yoshiko Tokachi, a Diet member (Episode 9–11)
- Kazuyo Aoki as the owner of a hot spring (Episode 11)
- Takeo Nakahara as Minoru Hanyū, a Chief Cabinet Secretary (Episode 11)

==== Special ====
- Kei Inoo (Hey! Say! JUMP) as Kojirō Himuro, a figure skating champion
- Munetaka Aoki as Gen Akagi
- Manami Hashimoto as Harumi Kanazawa
- Shōken Kunimoto as a stall owner
- Kaito Takamura as Sōta Aoki, Gen's son

==== Season four ====
- Daichi Watanabe as Jun Ichiki, an IT company director (Episode 1)
- Kei Yamamoto as Hideo Nioka, a village chief of Nijikawa, Yamagata (Episode 2)
- Yuriko Hoshi as Chiyoko Nioka, Hideo's wife (Episode 2)
- Hiro Otaka as Ozaki, a village chief assistant (Episode 2)
- Tokuma Nishioka as Yōji Kanemoto (Episode 2)
- Kōichirō Sakai as Kanemoto's secretary (Episode 2)
- Tamaki Shirai as Hideo's secret daughter (Episode 2)
- Yuki Matsushita as Misae Suyama, Saionji's former girlfriend and a former hostess (Episode 3)
- Saki Takaoka as Mirei Yotsuba, one of the Yotsuba sisters beauty unit (Episode 4)
- Kinako Kobayashi as Mion Yotsuba, one of the Yotsuba sisters beauty unit (Episode 4)
- Yūichi Tsuchiya as Tetsuo Goto, a single father patient who had a metal allergy (Episode 5)
- Ayumu Yokoyama as Shōta Goto, Tetsuo's son (Episode 5)
- Ian Moore as John Starkey, a professor at Boston University (Episode 6)
- Kenji Sakamoto as Rock Shrimp, Starkey's assistant (Episode 6)
- Shinji Takeda as Takashi Nanao, a famous deaf pianist (Episode 7)
- Kang Ji-young as Yuka Nanase, Nanao's assistant (Episode 7)
- Minosuke as Kuniharu Yasuhara, Nanao's manager (Episode 7)
- Ryōsei Konishi as Yuta Yaotome, a superstar idol (Episode 8)
- Manami Miyaji as Yumi Kawai, Yaotome's manager, later as Yaotome's wife (Episode 8)
- Shinobu Nakayama as Emi Kujō, a surgeon's wife at Keirin University Hospital (Episode 9)
- Toshihiro Yashiba as Taisuke Kujō, a surgeon at Keirin University Hospital and also Emi's husband (Episode 9)
- Jirō Dan as Haruo Samejima, a director of Keirin University Hospital (Episode 9)
- Hitomi Takahashi as Ritsuko Samejima, Haruo's wife (Episode 9)
- Kōji Yano as Wang Chau, a businessman and founder of Wang International Clinic (Episode 10–11)
- Shunsaku Kudō as Goto, Wang's translator (Episode 10–11)
- Meisa Kuroki as Tokiko, Wang's wife (Episode 10)
- Charles Glover as Leonard Scoope, a presidential candidate (Episode 11)
- Jenny Skidmore as Diana, Scoope's wife (Episode 11)
- Daimaou Kosaka as a delivery package courier (Episode 11)

==== Season five ====
- Kazuyuki Matsuzawa as Kazuhisa Kurumada, a bus driver (Episode 1)
- Yoshikazu Ebisu as himself (Episode 1)
- Takashi Masu as Tatsuo Isshiki, a medical journalist who having affair with Madoka Shimura (Episode 1)
- Blake Crawford as Jichael Mackson, a surgeon from Boston University (Episode 1)
- Mariko Akama as Isshiki's wife (Episode 1)
- Yoshiko Nakada as Fujiko, Ito's mother (Episode 2)
- Mitsuru Hirata as Kotobuki Mikamo, a pricinpal of Totei University Kindergarten (Episode 3)
- Eishi Ōfuji as Kenta, a Totei University Kindergarten student (Episode 3)
- Yuira Gotō as Mei, a Totei University Kindergarten student (Episode 3)
- Kōdai Matsumoto as Tsubasa, a Totei University Kindergarten student (Episode 3)
- Riisa Naka as Shiori Uchikanda (Episode 4)
- Shōtarō Mamiya as Goro Gotanda, a famous shogi player (Episode 5)
- Sei Hiraizumi as Yoshio Mutsuura, a Mikawaya gyoza restaurant owner (Episode 6)
- Yoneko Matsukane as Atsuko Mutsuura, Yoshio's wife (Episode 6)
- Hiroki Konno as Shingo Urita, an anesthesiologist (Episode 6)
- Hajime Tsukumo as Tamaki, a politician who operated by Inomata (Episode 6)
- Charlotte Kate Fox as Natasha Natinsky, a former surgeon and Hara's ex-girlfriend (Episode 7)
- Naho Toda as Sayuri Uchikanda, Kagenobu Uchikanda's wife (Episode 7)
- Kiyoe Koiizuka as Nanaka, Uchikanda's cousin (Episode 7)
- Shōzō Hayashiya as Takuya Yakumo, a former secretary of Minister of Health, Labour and Welfare (Episode 8)
- Ayaka Imoto as Haruka Kokonoe, a ballet dancer student (Episode 9)
- Sachie Hara as Hisako Kokonoe, Haruka's mother (Episode 9)
- Kōhei Ōtomo as Setsurō Kokonoe, Haruka's grandfather and Hisako's father (Episode 9)
- Kitaro as Kimoto, an orthopedic surgeon (Episode 9)
- Hidekazu Nagae as a prosecutor who arrested Uchikanda (Episode 10)
- Saki Seto as a prosecutor who arrested Hiruma (Episode 10)

==== Season six ====
- Masachika Ichimura as Nicholas Tange, a wealthy investor who was hired to restructure Totei University Hospital (Episode 1 - 10)
- Shinji Takeda as Yu Samejima, Tange right-hand man (Episode 1 -10)
- Mio Imada as Nurse Masako Oma (Episode 5-10)
- Yusuke Itagaki as Kimihiko Ōyama, a special prosecutor (Episode 1, 7 ,9)
- Moro Morooka as Toshirō Nisshiki, an CEO of Nisshiki Group (Episode 2)
- Moka Kamishiraishi as Yuri Nisshiki, Toshirō's daughter and Furusawa's girlfriend who later as his wife (Episode 2)
- Shō Kiyohara as Kenji Furusawa, a domino expert and Yuri's boyfriend who later as her husband (Episode 2)
- Reiko Kataoka as Miyako Nisshiki, Toshirō's wife (Episode 2)
- Takuzō Kadono as Saburō Umezawa, a politician (Episode 3)
- Aki Nishihara as Kuniko Takeda, Umezawa's secretary and Hiruma's ex-lawyer (Episode 3)
- Shinichi Hatori as Customer T, a Monjaemon restaurant customer (Episode 3)
- Tooru Tamakawa as Customer H, a Monjaemon restaurant customer (Episode 3)
- Mitsuko Baisho as Yoshino, Ushio's mother (Episode 4)
- Kenshi Okada as Kiyoaki Yokkaichi, a world-renowned skater (Episode 4)
- Shima Iwashita as Masae Mihara, a chief of Japan Nurses Federation (Episode 5)
- Kenji Anan as Goro Mihara, Masae's son (Episode 5)
- Mayuko Saigō as Chiaki Mihara, Masae's granddaughter (Episode 5)
- Gaku Oshida and Shieri Ohata as the naughty couple (Episode 5)
- Hikakin as himself (Episode 5)
- Yuni Akino as Megumi, a nurse at Nurse Station bar (Episode 5)
- Umino Kawamura as Rika a nurse at Nurse Station bar (Episode 5)
- Riku Toida as Shinnosuke Mihara, Masae's great grandson (Episode 5)
- Yūta Hiraoka as Shōta Rokkakubashi, a director of Hexagon Bridge and a billionaire (Episode 6)
- Kahomi Takarabe as Mutsumi Minadzuki (Episode 6)
- Eriko Kimura as Mutsumi's mother (Episode 6)
- Alan Lowe as Seven Goldberg, a world banker (Episode 7)
- Ananda Jacobs as Natalie Goldberg, Seven's wife (Episode 7)
- Marika Matsumoto as Maria Nakayama, a surgeon at Totei University Hospital and later Hachimura's wife (Episode 8)
- Terunosuke Takezai as Masayoshi Hachimura, a politician who will be next prime minister and later Nakayama's husband (Episode 8)
- Ryudo Uzaki as Yuji Kudō, a famous rockstar (Episode 9)
- Mariko Tsutsui as Kyoko Kudō, Yuji's wife (Episode 9)
- Enon Kawatani as Takuya Niitsu, a singer-songwriter (Episode 9)
- Kairi Jō as Kazuto Yoshiyuki, a child pianist (Episode 9–10)

==== Season seven ====
- Ai Tominaga as Yuka Hitotsubashi, a member of House of Councillors (Episode 1)
- Masaki Okada as Kei Ichiki (Episode 1)
- Jasmine Rose as Nurse Jasmine, a nurse in New York who passes away (Episode 1)
- Mio Imada as Nurse Masako Oma (Episode 1 - 10)
- Yui Natsukawa as Mayako Niki (Episode 2)
- Ichirota Miyakawa as Yashiro Kanbe, the Vice Minister of Health, Labor and Welfare (Episode 3, 8)
- Maiko Kawakami as Kumiko Kanbe, Yashiro's wife who later divorced (Episode 3)
- Kaname Ouki as Yuika Shiki, a musical actress (Episode 4)
- Reina Sumi as Kaede Hayami, Shiki's rival (Episode 4)
- Taira Imata as Shunichirō Ōkawa, a member of House of Representatives who having affair with Kaede (Episode 4)
- Nao Matsushita as Akari Nasuda (Nurse X), a freelance nurse (Episode 5)
- Hajime Inoue as Kazuo Itsuki, a rectal cancer patient (Episode 5)
- Yōko Kondo as Yōko Itsuki, Kazuo's wife (Episode 5)
- Hayato Yoshida as Oh Miroku, a Chinese IT president's son (Episode 6)
- Toshie Negishi as Yasue Shichimiya, owner of (Episode 7)
- Ito Iraishi as Moeka Shichimiya, Yasue's daughter (Episode 7)
- Satoshi Tokushige as Sōshichi Enomoto, the Minister of the Environment (Episode 7)
- Yō Takahashi as Taichi Mukaishima, Sōshichi's secretary (Episode 7)
- Asaka Seto as Satsuki Yagami, Hiromi Jonouchi's high school classmate (Episode 8)
- Gennosuke as Yuki Yagami, Satsuki's only son (Episode 8)
- Kazuki Kosakai as a sushi restaurant chef (Episode 9–10)
- Mansour Diagne as Dr. Shelp, the director of Institute of Infectious Diseases from Safiristan (Episode 9–10)
- Igor T. as Julius, Dr. Shelp's attendant who died after being infected (Episode 9–10)
- Cookie as Masayoshi Kabutogawa, a construction consultant president (Episode 10)
- Hisako Manda as Katsuko Minami, governor of Tokyo (Episode 10)

== Broadcast history ==
Doctor-X's first season aired from October 18 to December 13, 2012, on Thursdays on TV Asahi in Japan. It frequently was one of the top ranked dramas on private television in its time slot.

Season	Episodes	Originally released		Rank	Rating
Season	Episodes	First released	Last released	Rank	Rating
1	8	October 18, 2012	December 13, 2012	TBA	19.1%
2	9	October 17, 2013	December 19, 2013	TBA	23.0%
3	11	October 9, 2014	December 18, 2014	TBA	22.9%
4	11	October 13, 2016	December 22, 2016	1	21.5%
5	10	October 12, 2017	December 14, 2017	TBA	20.7%
6	10	October 17, 2019	December 19, 2019	TBA	18.5%
7	10	October 14, 2021	December 16, 2021	1	16.5%

=== Season one ===
Premiering in 2012, the first season had 8 episodes and averaged a viewer share of 19.1%. The final episode of the season was 15 minutes longer than other episodes.

No. overall	No. in season	Title	Directed by	Written by	Original release date	Japan viewers (millions)
1	1	"その手袋で触るな！全員、ホールドアップ！"	Miho Nakazono	Naoki Tamura	October 18, 2012	18.6%
2	2	"死なせません。私、失敗しないので"	Miho Nakazono	Hidetomo Matsuda	October 25, 2012	17.6%
3	3	"いりません。ネーミングがヘンだし、まずいので"	Miho Nakazono	Naoki Tamura	November 8, 2012	17.4%
4	4	"私にとって手術は、プライスレスのライフワークです"	Miho Nakazono	Hidetomo Matsuda	November 15, 2012	17.1%
5	5	"あなたの手術、失敗したんじゃないですか?"	Miho Nakazono	Hidetomo Matsuda	November 22, 2012	17.7%
6	6	"私は切って助ける!"	Miho Nakazono	Naoki Tamura	November 29, 2012	18.6%
7	7	"本当のことを教えてあげるのが医者の義務じゃないんですか?"	Miho Nakazono	Hidetomo Matsuda	December 6, 2012	20.1%
8	8	"手術場には、馴れ合いも、助け合いも、御意もいらない。助けなきゃいけない病人がいるだけ"	Miho Nakazono	Naoki Tamura	December 13, 2012	24.4%

=== Season two ===
The second season aired in 2013, and included 9 episodes which averaged a viewer share of 23.0%.

No. overall	No. in season	Title	Directed by	Written by	Original release date	Japan viewers (millions)
9	1	"このまま閉じたら、三ヶ月以内に命落としますよ"	Miho Nakazono	Naoki Tamura	October 17, 2013	22.8%
10	2	"私なら切れます。死なせません。絶対に失敗しないので"	Miho Nakazono	Hidetomo Matsuda	October 24, 2013	23.1%
11	3	"生体腎小腸交換移植, 私ならできます"	Aya Takei	Hidetomo Matsuda	October 31, 2013	18.4%
12	4	"成功したら、あなたに手帖をあげる。蛭間の秘密がぎっしり詰まったあの手帖…"	Makoto Hayashi	Naoki Tamura	November 7, 2013	21.3%
13	5	"失敗しない医者なんて、いるわけない。私以外"	Makoto Hayashi	Hidetomo Matsuda	November 14, 2013	23.7%
14	6	"いらない臓器なんてない! 体の中にいらないものなんてない!"	Toshio Terada	Naoki Tamura	November 21, 2013	22.1%
15	7	"選挙のために手術を利用した…患者を道具にして。手術を舐めるな!"	Makoto Hayashi	Hidetomo Matsuda	November 28, 2013	23.9%
16	8	"この世に失敗が許される医者なんていていいの?私は失敗したくないから、自分で切る"	Toshio Terada	Naoki Tamura	December 12, 2013	22.5%
17	9	"患者さんにとって、オペは最後のチャンス。だからそれに勝ち続けること。それが私の夢。"	Toshio Terada	Naoki Tamura	December 19, 2013	26.9%

=== Season three ===
The third season aired in 2014.

No. overall	No. in season	Title	Directed by	Written by	Original release date	Japan viewers (millions)
18	1	"命は自分のために使えよ"	Makoto Hayashi	Naoki Tamura	October 9, 2014	21.3%
19	2	"ロボットより私の手の方が、完璧で確実なので"	Makoto Hayashi	Hidetomo Matsuda	October 16, 2014	20.9%
20	3	"命を前に根回しもへったくれもない"	Makoto Hayashi	Naoki Tamura	October 23, 2014	20.8%
21	4	"切りましょうか, 私が。私なら完璧に治せますよ"	Makoto Hayashi	Hidetomo Matsuda	October 30, 2014	23.7%
22	5	"医者の勝ち負けなんてどうでもいいんだって。患者が勝たなきゃ意味ないじゃん"	Makoto Hayashi	Naoki Tamura	November 6, 2014	22.2%
23	6	"これ以上は切れない"	Makoto Hayashi	Hayato Yamada	November 13, 2014	23.6%
24	7	"私、勝負してないので"	Makoto Hayashi	Hidetomo Matsuda	November 20, 2014	22.8%
25	8	"…待つ"	Toshio Terada	Hidetomo Matsuda	November 28, 2014	21.8%
26	9	"患者にとって医者は一人。あんたもプロでしょ!"	Makoto Hayashi	Naoki Tamura	December 4, 2014	21.6%
27	10	"汚い手術はしたくない"	Miho Nakazono	Hidetomo Matsuda	December 11, 2014	24.8%
28	11	"私はたった一人の大好きな人のオペがしたいんだよ!"	Miho Nakazono	Naoki Tamura	December 18, 2014	27.4%

=== Special ===
The two-hour special followed the third season, airing in July 2016. Daimon is in Kanazawa, with action centering around the country's vanguard hospital for drug testing Cross Medical Center serving as the hospital backdrop. National politician Aiko Ichinose, played by Kayako Kishimoto, collapses on the street following an intimate interlude. Daimon finds him on the street, and sees to his transport to the Cross Medical Center. She then immediately operates on the politician after getting him there. Meanwhile, reigning world figure skating champion Kojiro Himuro, played by guest star Hey! Say! JUMP group member Kei Inoo, is suffering from chronic thromboembolic pulmonary hypertension ahead of the upcoming world championships. Medical Center of the Cross director Kantaro Kurosu asks Daimon Michiko to perform the surgery.

No. overall	No. in season	Title	Directed by	Written by	Original release date	Japan viewers (millions)
29	1	"復活!!!! 失敗しないハケンの女!黒い巨塔に現れた最強の敵…!?金沢〜能登…4回転半メダリストの緊急オペ3000万!!"	Miho Nakazono	Naoki Tamura	July 3, 2016	22.0%

=== Season four ===
Doctor-X continued to run on Thursday nights in the 9:00 PM time slot on TV Asahi. The fourth season contained 11 episodes and aired in late 2016. It finished with an average market share of 21.5%.

The maximum viewing share during the season was the last episode, during a scene featuring 43-year-old Japanese comedian Daimaou Kosaka. It finished top in the rankings among Japanese dramas in 2016. It was the top ranked show for the first half of its run in the fourth season. The final episode of the season had a market share of 22.8%. The third episode had the highest market share for the season at 24.3%. The fourth episode had a rating of 21.3%. Among viewers who saved the show to watch later, the show ranked third in October 2016.

The airing of the third episode was slightly delayed as a result of a live program about the bombing of Hiroshima.

No. overall	No. in season	Title	Directed by	Written by	Original release date	Japan viewers (millions)
30	1	"孤高のハケンの女医・大門未知子がついに帰ってきた!X史上最も危険な敵が君臨する白い巨塔に鋭いメスを入れる!!"	Miho Nakazono	Naoki Tamura	October 13, 2016	20.4%
31	2	"貧乏村長vsセコい国会議員オペ...Wで失敗しないので"	Makoto Hayashi	Naoki Tamura	October 20, 2016	19.7%
32	3	"20年前の医療ミス!?不倫相手のお腹の秘密"	Toshio Terada	Hidetomo Matsuda	October 27, 2016	24.3%
33	4	"美人姉妹同時刻オペ!!太る病気の秘密!?"	Takafumi Kosaka	Hidetomo Matsuda	November 3, 2016	21.3%
34	5	"派閥争い パワハラ手術も失敗しないので!!"	Makoto Hayashi	Naoki Tamura	November 10, 2016	20.4%
35	6	"御意男のクーデター!!メスなき心臓手術!?"	Makoto Hayashi	Hidetomo Matsuda	November 17, 2016	21.5%
36	7	"音をなくしたピアニストの命とプライド"	Toshio Terada	Naoki Tamura	November 24, 2016	22.8%
37	8	"ウイルス感染…! 手術不可能な密室!?"	Manabu Uda	Hidetomo Matsuda	December 1, 2016	20.7%
38	9	"教授婦人会のドンが送り込んだ患者の罠!?"	Takafumi Kosaka	Naoki Tamura	December 8, 2016	22.6%
39	10	"母子同時オペ!? わずか25センチの命"	Miho Nakazono	Hidetomo Matsuda	December 15, 2016	20.5%
40	11	"さらば大門未知子!! さらば友よ…聖夜のオペも失敗しないので"	Miho Nakazono	Naoki Tamura	December 22, 2016	22.8%

=== Season five ===
The fifth season aired Japan in late 2017. After five episodes, the show was averaging 20.1% market share and was the top ranked drama on private television networks.

No. overall	No. in season	Title	Directed by	Written by	Original release date	Japan viewers (millions)
41	1	"復活!!!! 失敗しないハケンの女 世界横断オペ2000万"	Makoto Hayashi	Naoki Tamura	October 12, 2017	20.9%
42	2	"VSゆとり院内盗撮!? 過保護な患者の秘密"	Toshio Terada	Hidetomo Matsuda	October 19, 2017	19.6%
43	3	"VSキレる教授!? セカンドオピニオン失敗しないので"	Makoto Hayashi	Naoki Tamura	October 26, 2017	19.0%
44	4	"外科医を育てる超VIP患者の秘密!?"	Takafumi Kosaka	Hidetomo Matsuda	November 2, 2017	19.1%
45	5	"診断1秒人工知能VS失敗しない野生の勘!?"	Makoto Hayashi	Naoki Tamura	November 9, 2017	20.8%
46	6	"おしどり夫婦の緊急Wオペ!? 私麻酔もできるので"	Takafumi Kosaka	Hidetomo Matsuda	November 16, 2017	20.7%
47	7	"日米女医対決!! オペ室の中心で愛を叫ぶ"	Takafumi Kosaka	Hayato Yamada	November 23, 2017	20.1%
48	8	"命懸けの内部告発!? 最強黒幕の秘密…"	Makoto Hayashi	Naoki Tamura	November 30, 2017	20.6%
49	9	"最終章〜失敗しないハケンの女倒れる…!?"	Toshio Terada	Hidetomo Matsuda	December 7, 2017	21.2%
50	10	"さらば大門未知子!!!! 衝撃のラストオペは…35億!? 絶対失敗しないので"	Makoto Hayashi	Naoki Tamura	December 14, 2017	25.3%

=== Season six ===
No. overall	No. in season	Title	Directed by	Written by	Original release date	Japan viewers (millions)
51	1	"復活!!!! 失敗しないハケンの女 vs300億のAIオペ"	Naoki Tamura	Miho Nakazono	October 17, 2019	20.3%
52	2	"貧乏患者vs5000億の命!? ドミノも失敗しないので"	Hidetomo Matsuda	Miho Nakazono	October 24, 2019	19.0%
53	3	"失言大臣の舌を切る!? 私失敗も失言もしないので!!"	Naoki Tamura	Makoto Hayashi	October 31, 2019	18.1%
54	4	"85%認知症の緊急オペ!? AIより失敗しない診断!"	Hidetomo Matsuda	Makoto Hayashi	November 7, 2019	19.1%
55	5	"看護師のドン!!深夜密室のオペ 女の秘密は守るので"	Naoki Tamura	Miho Nakazono	November 14, 2019	15.9%
56	6	"1000億の売名オペ!? 輸血不足でも失敗しないので!!"	Hayato Yamada	Takafumi Kosaka	November 21, 2019	19.3%
57	7	"植毛患者アレルギーの秘密‥‥!? 禁断のオペ5億ドル"	Hidetomo Matsuda	Miho Nakazono	November 28, 2019	18.6%
58	8	"修羅場のオペ室‥‥!? 失敗しない呪文のトリック"	Naoki Tamura	Makoto Hayashi	December 5, 2019	17.4%
59	9	"死ぬのは誰でも怖い‥‥ だからこそ私失敗しないので"	Hayato Yamada	Miho Nakazono	December 12, 2019	18.2%
60	10	"さらば大門未知子!! さらば東帝大‥‥ ラストオペも絶対失敗しないので!!"	Naoki Tamura	Makoto Hayashi	December 19, 2019	19.3%

=== Season seven ===
No. overall	No. in season	Title	Directed by	Written by	Original release date	Japan viewers (millions)
61	1	"復活!!!! 失敗しないハケンの女 感染緊急オペ1000万"	Naoki Tamura	Miho Nakazono	October 14, 2021	19.0%
62	2	"100%の刺客の秘密!?私逃げも失敗もしないので!!"	Naoki Tamura	Miho Nakazono	October 21, 2021	15.9%
63	3	"たこつぼ心筋症…スキャンダル隠蔽オペ1000万!!"	Osamu Katayama	Makoto Hayashi	October 28, 2021	16.6%
64	4	"手術拒否の歌姫…クビを賭けた大逆転オペ2000万!"	Yamada Hayata	Takafumi Kosaka	November 4, 2021	15.2%
65	5	"謎の看護師ナースX!?ハケンでも失敗しないので"	Naoki Tamura	Miho Nakazono	November 11, 2019	16.7%
66	6	"大富豪の命の値段!?師匠との大喧嘩…秘密の理由"	Osamu Katayama	Takafumi Kosaka	November 18, 2021	15.7%
67	7	"帰ってきた新米!患者替え玉オペ配信!?"	Takahashi Takashi	Hiroyuki Komine	November 25, 2021	14.9%
68	8	"さよなら友よ〜外科医の宿命"	Naoki Tamura	Makoto Hayashi	December 2, 2021	15.5%
69	9	"バベルの塔!野望か命か…!? 大門未知子、最後の患者"	Yamada Hayata	Miho Nakazono	December 9, 2021	16.8%
70	10	"さらば大門未知子! 生と死の緊急事態でも失敗しないので!!"	Naoki Tamura	Miho Nakazono	December 16, 2021	17.7%

== Ratings ==
Doctor-X : Japan viewers per episode (millions)

Season	Episode number										
Season	1	2	3	4	5	6	7	8	9	10	11
1	18.6	17.6	17.4	17.1	17.7	18.6	20.1	24.4	–		
2	22.8	23.1	18.4	21.3	23.7	22.1	23.9	22.5	26.9	–	
3	21.3	20.9	20.8	23.7	22.2	23.6	22.8	21.8	21.6	24.8	27.4
4	20.4	19.7	24.3	21.3	20.4	21.5	22.8	20.7	22.6	20.5	22.8
5	20.9	19.6	19.0	19.1	20.8	20.7	20.1	20.6	21.2	25.3	–
6	20.3	19.0	18.1	19.1	15.9	19.3	18.6	17.4	18.2	19.3	–
7	19.0	15.9	16.6	15.2	16.7	15.7	14.9	15.5	16.8	17.7	–

== Production team ==
Miho Nakazomo was the main writer for the first season. She had experience writing dramas with her 10 years of work on "Woman's woman ~ Tax collector inspector" and on the original story she wrote called "Haken no Rika".

== Awards ==
Ryoko Yonekura was awarded best actress at the 21st Hashida Awards for her performance as Doctor-X. It was her second time winning the award, previously winning it for her performance in the second season. Yonekura was also recognized with the Kuniko Mukda prize in 2013.

Miho Nakazomo co-won the best writer award at the 21st Hashida Awards, sharing the honor with Kobayashi Nenjyutsu.

== Spinoffs ==
Doctor-X: Surgeon Michiko Daimon was spun off with the show Doctor-Y: Surgeon Hideki Kaji, featuring Masanobu Katsumura playing Hideki Kaji. It started airing on September 29, 2016. Katsumura was surprised and pleased that his character was spun off and he became the lead of the new series.

== Distribution ==
Doctor-X: Surgeon Michiko Daimon is distributed internationally via Netflix and Amazon Prime in selected countries with English language subtitles. In India, Doctor-X is dubbed in Hindi language on the occasion of International Women's Day and it is as of 2018 streaming on Indian Digital Platform ZEE5 for Season 1 and 2 only. It's not available anymore in the app. However, all six seasons are now available in India through the Netflix streaming service. Japan Foundation also distributed the first seasons in some Latin American countries (Mexico, Guatemala, El Salvador and Bolivia) in 2017, dubbed in Spanish.

In Southeast Asia, WakuWaku Japan aired all six seasons of the series with subtitles, and is scheduled to air the seventh season on a near-simulcast basis starting in October 2021.

== Adaptations ==
- A South Korean adaptation titled Doctor X: Mafia in White starring Kim Ji-won as Gye Su-jeong. The series is produced by Studio S, Studio Dragon, and HighZium Studio. It premiered on SBS TV on October 9, 2026.
