= Kim Min-seok (singer, born 1991) =

South Korean singer

- 김민석
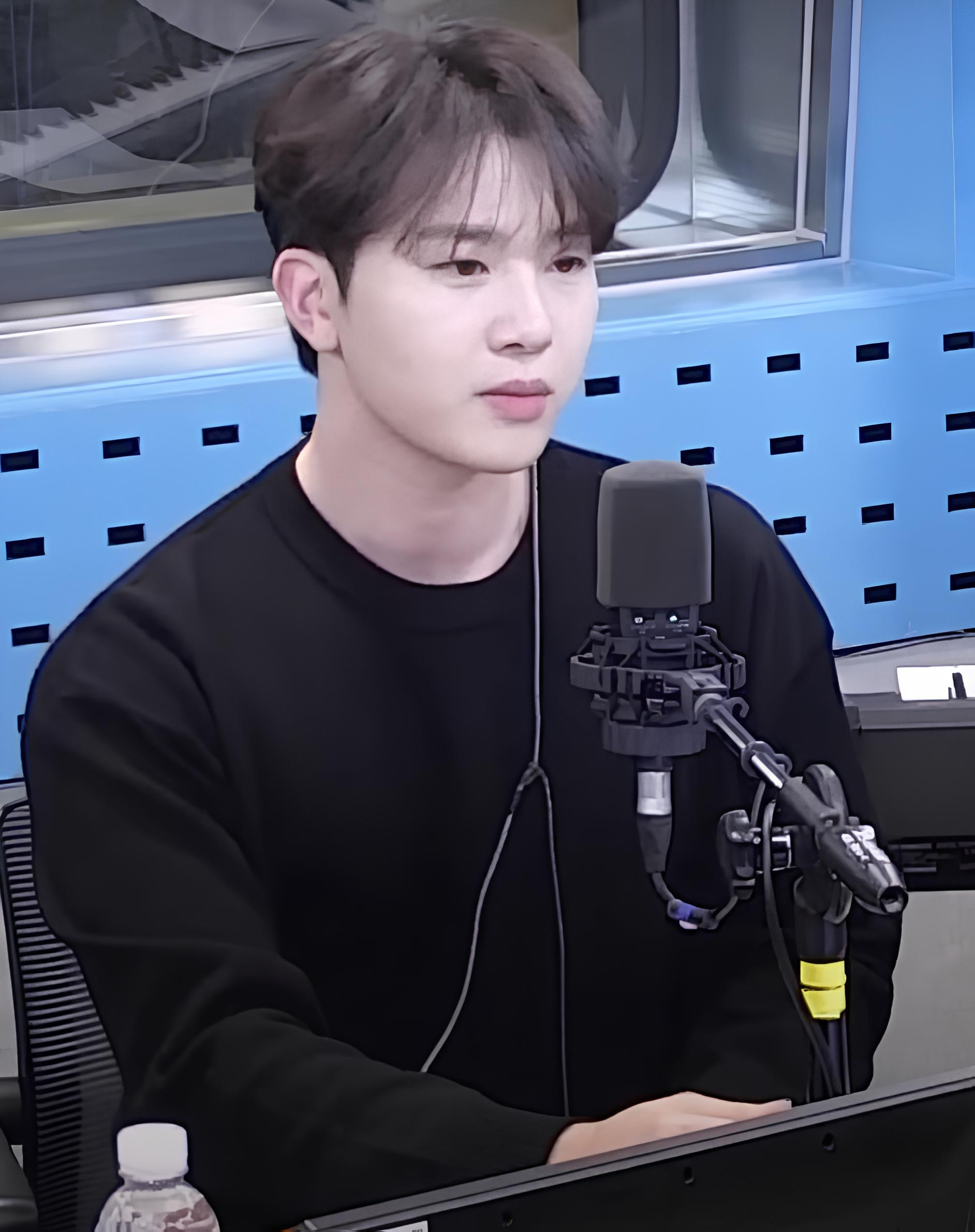
- Kim in 2023
- Born: Kim Min-seok; August 26, 1991 (age 35); South Korea
- Education: Seoul Institute of the Arts
- Occupations: Singer; songwriter
- Relatives: Kim Woo-seok (brother)
- Musical career
- Instrument: Vocals
- Years active: 2015–present
- Label: Abyss Company
- Member of: MeloMance

Korean name
- Hangul: 김민석
- RR: Gim Minseok
- MR: Kim Minsŏk

Kim Min-seok (Korean: 김민석; born August 26, 1991) is a South Korean singer-songwriter and known for his work as a member of South Korean duo MeloMance. In November 2022, Kim also participated in project group Gomak Boys, which formed through the reality of the same name by Kakao Entertainment.

His 2021 solo single "Drunken Confession", a remake of the 2005 single of South Korean singer Feel, spent five weeks at number one on South Korea's Gaon Digital Chart.

== Career ==
In 2026, Kim lent his voice to original soundtrack of Netflix original series Can This Love Be Translated?, with title "Love Language." A romantic comedy that follows the relationship between Joo Ho-jin (Kim Seon-ho), a multilingual interpreter, and Cha Mu-hee (Go Youn-jung) a top actress. The song won Best OST in Global OTT Awards.

== Philanthropy ==
In January 2023, Kim donated ₩35 million to the Social Welfare Community Chest of Love and participated in the 2023 Hope Sharing campaign with his younger brother Kim Woo-seok.

== Discography ==
=== Extended plays ===
List of extended plays, with selected details, chart position, and sales
Title	Details	Peak chart positions	Sales
Title	Details	KOR	Sales
Cinema	Released: September 20, 2019; Label: Mint Paper, Label GHS; Formats: CD, digital download, streaming	52	KOR: 307
Reminiscence	Released: February 1, 2024; Label: Abyss Company; Formats: CD, digital download	38	KOR: 6,381

=== Singles ===
==== As lead artist ====
List of singles as lead artist, with selected chart positions, showing year released and album name
Title	Year	Peak chart positions		Certifications	Album
Title	Year	KOR Circle	KOR Billb. (Note: Includes the Billboard K-pop Hot 100 (defunct as of 2022), and South Korea Songs (part of Billboard's Hits of the World (2022 onwards)).)	Certifications	Album
"Good Night"	2018	—	—	—N/a	Non-album singles
"Spring Comes" (봄이 오는 날에)	2019	95	92	—N/a	Non-album singles
"My Love" (다 생각나서)	2019	— (Note: "My Love" did not enter the Gaon Digital Chart, but peaked at number 81 on the Gaon BGM Chart.)	—	—N/a	Cinema
"Drunken Confession" (취중고백)	2021	1	6	KMCA: Platinum (st.)	Non-album singles
"Goodbye" (작별인사)	2022	— (Note: "Goodbye" did not enter the Circle Digital Chart, but peaked at number 36 and 52 on the Circle BGM Chart and Circle Download Chart, respectively.)	—	—N/a	Non-album singles
"Always with You" (너와 함께)	2023	53	—	—N/a	Non-album singles
"Countdown to Three Like a Habit" (버릇처럼 셋을 센다)	2026	161	—	—N/a	Non-album singles
"—" denotes a recording that did not chart.

==== As featured artist ====
List of charted singles as featured artist, with selected chart positions, showing year released and album name
Title	Year	Peak chart positions		Album
Title	Year	KOR Circle	KOR Billb.	Album
"Just Broke Up Today" (오늘 내가 한 이별) (Urban Zakapa's Kwon Soo-il featuring Kim Min-seok)	2019	137	—	With
"Flower" (꽃) (Park Bom featuring Kim Min-seok)	2022	53	71	Non-album singles
"Fxxxnds" (친구로 지내다 보면) (Big Naughty featuring Kim Min-seok)	2023	42	—	Non-album singles
"—" denotes a recording that did not chart.

=== Soundtrack appearances ===
List of soundtrack appearances, with selected chart positions, showing year released and album name
Title	Year	Peak chart positions		Album
Title	Year	KOR Circle	KOR Billb.	Album
"To You" (너에게)	2018	41	46	Love Playlist 3 OST
"Perhaps Love" (사랑인가요)	2019	178	—	Perhaps Love? OST
"Still" (아직)	2019	— (Note: "Still" did not enter the Gaon Digital Chart, but peaked at number 73 on the Gaon BGM Chart.)	—	Perhaps Love? OST
"Love" (사랑)	2019	— (Note: "Love" did not enter the Gaon Digital Chart, but peaked at number 28 on the Gaon BGM Chart.)	—	Perhaps Love? OST
"A Butterfly Flew Away" (나비가 날았습니다)	2021	164	—	You Are My Spring OST
"The Wall" (벽)	2023	—	—	The Forbidden Marriage OST
"You Were Beautiful" (예뻤어)	2023	41	—	My Love OST
"Never Ending Story"	2023	149	—	A Time Called You OST
"Special Day"	2025	—	—	Dynamite Kiss OST
"Love Language" (사랑의 언어)	2026	29	—	Can This Love Be Translated? OST
"—" denotes a recording that did not chart.

== Filmography ==
=== Television show ===
Year	Title	Role	Notes	Ref.
2022	The Second World	Judge		
2022	Playlist	Cast Member	with Jeong Dong-hwan	
2023	Super Karaoke Survival: VS	Producer	with Young K	

=== Web shows ===
Year	Title	Role	Ref.
2022	Gomak Boys	Cast Member	

== Awards and nominations ==
Name of the award ceremony, year presented, award category, nominee(s) of the award, and the result of the nomination
Award ceremony	Year	Category	Nominee(s)	Result	Ref.
Blue Dragon Series Awards	2026	Popularity Award — OST	"Love Language"; Can This Love Be Translated?	Nominated	
Genie Music Awards	2022	Song of the Year	"Drunken Confession"	Nominated	
Global OTT Awards	2026	Best Original Song	"Love Language"; Can This Love Be Translated?	Won	
Golden Disc Awards	2023	Digital Song Bonsang	"Drunken Confession"	Won	
MAMA Awards	2022	Best Vocal Performance Solo	"Drunken Confession"	Nominated	
MAMA Awards	2022	Song of the Year	"Drunken Confession"	Longlisted	
MAMA Awards	2026	Best Original Soundtrack	"Love Language"; Can This Love Be Translated?	Pending	
Melon Music Awards	2022	Song of the Year	"Drunken Confession"	Nominated	
Melon Music Awards	2026	Best OST	"Love Language"; Can This Love Be Translated?	Pending	
Seoul International Drama Awards	2026	Outstanding OST	"Love Language"; Can This Love Be Translated?	Nominated	
