= Ryoko Yonekura =

Japanese actress (born 1975)

- 米倉 涼子
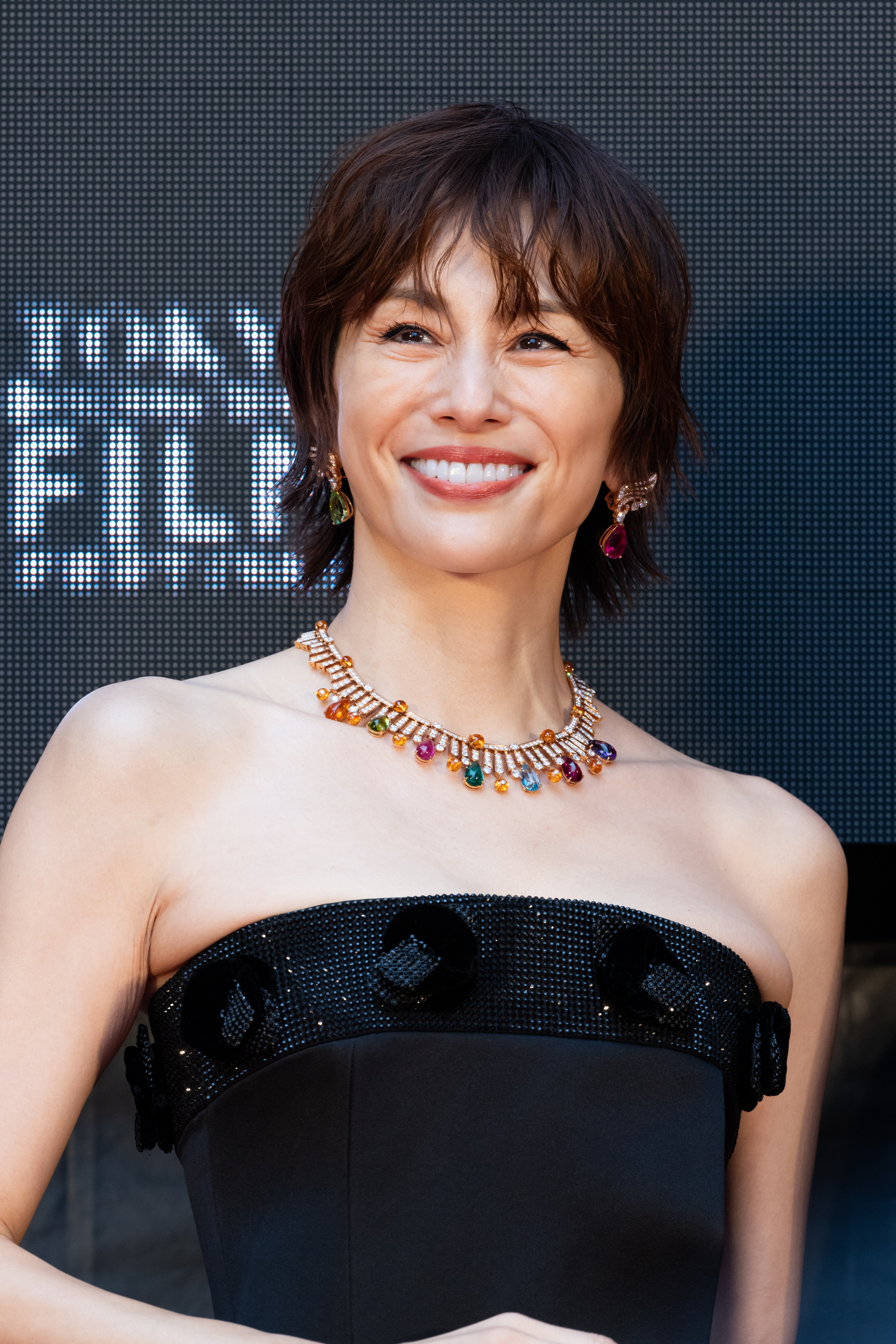
- Yonekura at the 37th Tokyo International Film Festival in 2024
- Born: August 1, 1975 (age 51); Yokohama, Kanagawa, Japan
- Occupation: Actress
- Years active: 1992–present
- Agent: Desafio
- Spouse: Unknown (m. 2014; div. 2016)
- Website: desafio-net.jp/en/

Ryoko Yonekura (米倉 涼子, Yonekura Ryōko; born August 1, 1975) is a Japanese actress and former fashion model best known for her role in the Japanese medical drama Doctor-X: Surgeon Michiko Daimon. She also performs the voice of Black Widow in the Japanese-language releases of the Avengers film series.

== Career ==
Yonekura studied classical ballet for 15 years from the age of five. Represented by the Oscar Promotion agency, she won the sixth Japan Bishōjo Contest in 1992. In 1993, she started her career as a model, working for fashion magazines such as CanCam. She announced her intention to start her acting career in 1999. Her acting debut was in the TBS television drama Koi no Kamisama, and has appeared in many dramas ever since.

Yonekura played the role of Roxie Hart in the Japanese-language production of Chicago in Tokyo 2008 and in 2010. She then learned the role in English and made her Broadway debut in 2012.

In late March 2020, her agency at the time, Oscar Promotion, announced that she would leave the agency after her contract expired on March 31, 2020. She founded her own personal agency, Desafio, in early April of the same year.

== Personal life ==
In December 2014, Yonekura announced that she had married a company owner two years her junior. In December 2016, Yonekura announced that she had divorced her husband. In a written statement, Yonekura commented, "After timely, repeated discussions, our divorce has been finalized. I am sorry to have caused trouble with my private matters." She continued, "I hope to move forward both as an actress and woman. I will do my best every day in order to challenge myself to various new things. Please continue to give me guidance and encouragement."

In October 2022, Yonekura announced she was withdrawing from performances of Chicago due to treatment for cerebrospinal fluid hypovolemia.

== Filmography ==
=== Television ===
Year	Title	Role	Notes	Ref.
2000	Koi no Kamisama	Erika Saionji		
2000	Tenki-yoho no Koibito	Ikuko Sudo		
2000	Hatachi no Kekkon	Ranko		
2000	Straight News	Yuka Ichino		
2001	Love Revolution	Mariko Endou		
2001	Hikon Kazoku	Hikaru Matoba		
2002	Pretty Girls	Ayumi Kurai		
2002	Artificial Beauty	Honami Saotome	Lead role	
2002	Sonagi: Ameagari no Satsui	Chizuru Otsuki	Lead role	
2003	Musashi	Otsu	Taiga drama	
2004	Okusama wa Majo	Arisa Matsui	Lead role	
2004	Kurokawa no Techo	Motoko Haraguchi	Lead role	
2005	Nyokei Kazoku	Fumino Hamada	Lead role	
2005	Haru to Natsu: Todokanakatta Tegami	Haru Takakura (young)	Lead role	
2005	Onna no Ichidaiki	Haruko Sugimura	Lead role	
2006	Kemonomichi	Tamiko Narusawa	Lead role	
2006	Fushin no Toki	Michiko Asai	Lead role	
2007	Warui Yatsura	Toyomi Terashima	Lead role	
2007	Katagoshi no Koibito	Moe Hayasaka	Lead role	
2008–2009	Kōshōnin	Reiko Usagi	Lead role; also known as The Negotiator	
2008	Monster Parent	Itsuki Takamura	Lead role	
2008	Koori no Hana	Kyoko Seno	Lead role	
2010	Nasake no Onna	Matsuko Matsudaira	Lead role	
2011	Hunter: Sono Onna-tachi, Shōkin Kasegi	Rei Isaka	Lead role	
2012	Atsui Kūki	Nobuko Kono	Lead role	
2012–2021	Doctor-X: Surgeon Michiko Daimon	Michiko Daimon	Lead role	
2013	35-sai no Koukousei	Ayako Baba	Lead role	
2014	Kaseifu wa Mita	Nobuko Sawaguchi	Lead role	
2014	Mighty Ant	Isako Sawada	Lead role	
2014	Out Burn	Eiko Yagami	Lead role	
2015	Kaseifu wa Mita 2	Nobuko Sawaguchi	Lead role	
2016	Kagerou Ezu	Nui	Lead role	
2016 - 2024	Doctor-Y: Surgeon Hideki Kaji	Michiko Daimon		
2018	Legal V Ex-lawyer Shoko Takanashi	Shoko Takanashi	Lead role	
2019	Crayon Shin-chan	Michiko Daimon (voice)	Episode: "Doctor-X"	
2022	The Journalist	Anna Matsuda	Lead role	
2023	Angel Flight	Nami Izawa	Lead role	

=== Film ===
Year	Title	Role	Notes	Ref.
2001	Cardboard House Girl	An Sakurai	Lead role	
2002	Gun Crazy: A Woman from Nowhere	Saki Yamada	Lead role	
2008	Sakura no Sono	Shino Wakamatsu		
2010	Koshonin the Movie	Reiko Usagi	Lead role	
2024	Doctor-X: The Movie	Michiko Daimon	Lead role	
2026	Angel Flight: The Movie	Nami Izawa	Lead role	

=== Japanese dub ===
Year	Title	Role	Ref.
2012	The Avengers	Natasha Romanoff / Black Widow (Scarlett Johansson)	
2013	Diana	Diana (Naomi Watts)	
2014	Captain America: The Winter Soldier	Natasha Romanoff / Black Widow (Scarlett Johansson)	
2015	Avengers: Age of Ultron	Natasha Romanoff / Black Widow (Scarlett Johansson)	
2016	Captain America: Civil War	Natasha Romanoff / Black Widow (Scarlett Johansson)	
2018	Avengers: Infinity War	Natasha Romanoff / Black Widow (Scarlett Johansson)	
2019	Avengers: Endgame	Natasha Romanoff / Black Widow (Scarlett Johansson)	
2021	Black Widow	Natasha Romanoff / Black Widow (Scarlett Johansson)	
2022	Bullet Train	Maria Beetle (Sandra Bullock)	

== Awards and nominations ==
Year	Award	Work	Category	Result	Ref.
2002	26th Élan d'Or Award	—N/a	Newcomer of the Year	Won	
2023	Asian Academy Creative Award	Angel Flight	Best Actress in a Leading Role (Japan)	Won	
