= Hear Me: Our Summer =

2024 South Korean film by Jo Seon-ho

- Theatrical release poster
- Hangul: 청설
- Hanja: 聽說
- RR: Cheongseol
- MR: Ch'ŏngsŏl
- Directed by: Cho Sun-ho
- Screenplay by: Na Jae-won; Kwak Kyung-yoon
- Based on: Hear Me by Cheng Fen-fen
- Starring: Hong Kyung; Roh Yoon-seo; Kim Min-ju
- Cinematography: Kang Min-woo
- Edited by: Kim Sun-min
- Music by: Jo Yeong-wook
- Production companies: Movie Rock; Another Pictures
- Distributed by: Plus M Entertainment
- Release date: November 6, 2024
- Running time: 109 minutes
- Country: South Korea
- Languages: Korean; Korean Sign Language
- Box office: US$5.3 million

Hear Me: Our Summer (Korean: 청설) is a 2024 South Korean romantic drama film directed by Cho Sun-ho, starring Hong Kyung, Roh Yoon-seo, and Kim Min-ju. It is a remake of the 2009 Taiwanese romantic comedy film Hear Me. The film was released theatrically on November 6, 2024.

== Plot ==
Though his college life has ended, Yong-jun finds himself at a loss, with neither a clear dream nor any ambitions to pursue. Pressured by his mother, he reluctantly takes up a part-time job delivering lunchboxes, where he encounters Yeo-reum, his perfect ideal type.

Overcoming his shyness, Yong-jun approaches Yeo-reum with clumsy but honest sincerity. Meanwhile, Yeo-reum's younger sister, Ga-eul, cheers on Yong-jun's courage.

To get closer to Yeo-reum, who communicates with her hands, Yong-jun strives to see and feel more deeply rather than just listening. But just as he feels they've grown closer, Yeo-reum begins to distance herself from him for reasons unknown.

== Cast ==
- Hong Kyung as Lee Yong-jun
- Roh Yoon-seo as Seo Yeo-reum, Ga-eul's older sister and Yeong-jun's crush
- Kim Min-ju as Seo Ga-eul, Yeo-reum's younger sister who cheers on Yong-jun's courage
- Jung Yong-joo as Jo Jae-jin
- Hyun Bong-sik as Yong-jun's father
- Jung Hye-young as Yong-jun's mother

== Production ==
Principal photography began in July 2023 and concluded in October 2023.

== Release ==
Hear Me: Our Summer premiered in the 'Korean Cinema Today - Special Premiere' at the 29th Busan International Film Festival in October 2024, before its release in theaters.

== Reception ==
=== Box office ===
As of September 20, 2025, Hear Me: Our Summer has grossed $5,350,245 with a running total of 802,133 tickets sold.

=== Accolades ===
Award	Year	Category	Recipient(s)	Result	Ref.
Baeksang Arts Awards	2025	Best New Actress	Roh Yoon-seo	Won	
Blue Dragon Film Awards	2025	Best New Actress	Kim Min-ju	Nominated	
Blue Dragon Film Awards	2025	Best New Actress	Roh Yoon-seo	Nominated	
Buil Film Awards	2025	Best New Actress	Roh Yoon-seo	Nominated	
