= Still Shining =

2026 South Korean television series

- Promotional poster
- Hangul: 샤이닝
- Lit.: Shining
- RR: Syaining
- MR: Syaining
- Genre: Coming-of-age; Romance; Melodrama
- Written by: Lee Sook-yeon
- Directed by: Kim Yoon-jin
- Starring: Park Jin-young; Kim Min-ju
- Music by: Nam Hye-seung
- Country of origin: South Korea
- Original language: Korean
- No. of episodes: 10

Production
- Executive producers: Kim Gun-hong (CP); Kim Se-ah (CP); Park Joon-suh; Jang Se-jung; Choi Kyung-sook
- Producer: Song Dam-yi
- Production companies: SLL; Kakao Entertainment

Original release
- Network: JTBC
- Release: March 6 – April 3, 2026

Still Shining (Korean: 샤이닝) is a 2026 South Korean television series starring Park Jin-young and Kim Min-ju. It aired on JTBC from March 6, to April 3, 2026, every Friday at 20:50 (KST). It is also available for streaming on Netflix globally.

== Synopsis ==
Yeon Tae-seo and Mo Eun-ah meet and fall in love the summer before their senior year, but subsequent university commitments and shifting priorities in their lives force them to break up. Ten years later, the two meet again in Seoul, and old feelings resurface.

== Cast ==
=== Main ===
- Park Jin-young as Yeon Tae-seo

A subway engineer who views the world realistically and prioritizes living safely in the present. After achieving the independent life he long sought, he reunites with Mo Eun-ah, his first love from when he was nineteen, bringing subtle changes to his settled daily routine.

- Kim Min-ju as Mo Eun-ah

Yeon Tae-seo's first love and a hotelier who coincidentally reunites with him after living and working in Seoul.

- Shin Jae-ha as Bae Seong-chan

A senior hotelier who guided Mo Eun-ah onto the path of becoming a hotelier and remains by her side with quiet affection.

- Park Se-hyun as Im Ah-sol

A tax accountant who has long held unrequited feelings for Yeon Tae-seo.

=== Supporting ===
==== Yeon Tae-seo's family ====
- Sung Yoo-bin as Yeon Hee-seo

Yeon Tae-seo's younger brother who works at a rural post office. He was injured in the accident that killed their parents, leaving him with a permanent limp.

- Kang Shin-il as Yeon Chang-sik

Tae-seo and Hee-seo's grandfather.

- Byun Jung-hee as Park Hwa-soon

Tae-seo and Hee-seo's devoted grandmother.

==== Mo Eun-ah's family ====
- Kim Tae-hoon as Mo Seon-gyu

Eun-ah's father and a former food researcher who now specializes in natural and vegan cuisine in Yeonwoo-ri.

- Kim Ji-hyun as Park So-hyun (a/k/a Amy Park)

A third-generation Hawaiian immigrant journalist, who fell in love with Mo Seon-gyu after interviewing him.

==== Yeonwoo-ri people ====
- Park Jung-ja as fortune teller

The elderly owner of the village general store.

- Kim Cheol-yoon as Jeong Jin-soo

The eldest son of a woodworking shop owner and Yeon Tae-seo's longtime friend, who has quietly remained by his side through the years.

- Oh So-hyun as Jin Hyang-gi

A post office delivery worker who rides a scooter to deliver mail who is popular among the elderly residents.

==== Others ====
- Lee Chang-hoon as Mu Jeong-su

A Mathematics teacher at the rural high school where Yeon Tae-seo and Mo Eun-ah study.

- Lee Ji-hae as Jae-soon

A veteran train engineer who appears blunt and rough on the outside but deeply cares for her colleagues and takes pride in her work.

- Park Geun-rok as Kim Ho-sik

Park So-hyun's ex-boyfriend, who is a Seoul-based freelance content creator.

== Production ==
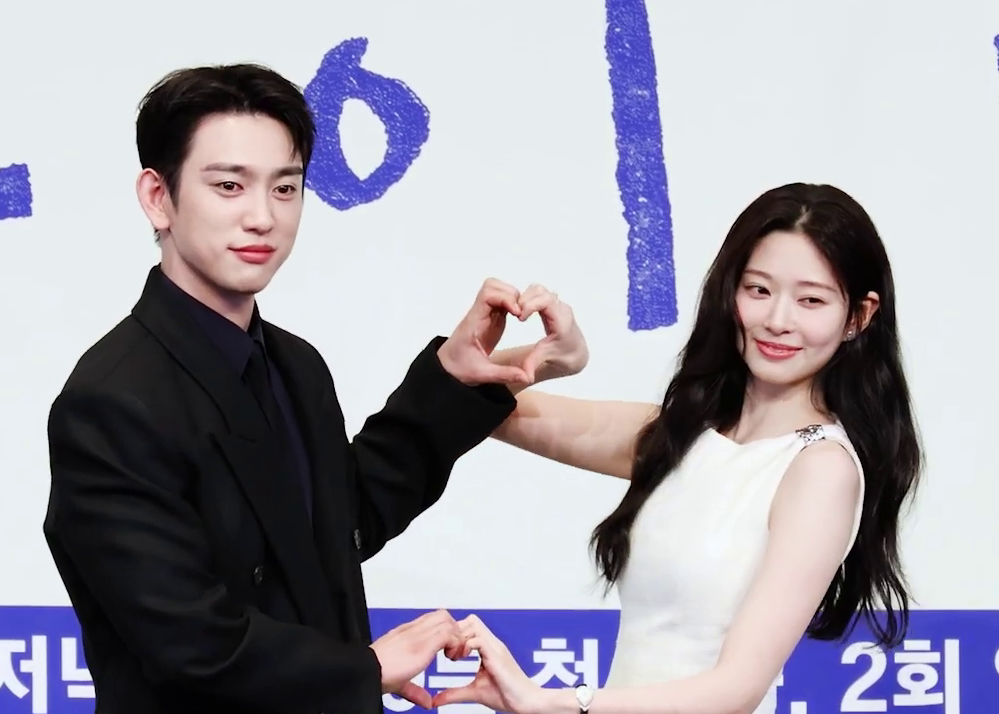
Park Jin-young and Kim Min-ju at the show's press conference on March 5, 2026

On September 23, 2024, Sports Chosun reported that Chae Jong-hyeop had been offered the male lead role, while Kim Min-ju was linked to the project the following November. Rowoon entered casting discussions in January 2025 when Chae declined, but ultimately Park Jin-young was cast to play Yeon Tae-seo in April.

Kim decided to star in the series because she often thought the script felt like a novel and had been wanting to try a youth melodrama. Park found the realistic story appealing because it didn't portray just a pretty youth, but struggles with problems that everyone could relate to; he was also captivated by Yeon Tae-seo, who he described as a warm character "who lives his life his own way, rather than being swayed by others' stares."

== Original soundtrack ==
=== Part 1 ===
Released on March 6, 2026
No.	Title	Lyrics	Music	Artist	Length
1.	"First Love (첫사랑)"	Nam Hye-seung; Park Jin-ho	Nam Hye-seung; Park Jin-ho	Jeong Se-woon	4:07
2.	"First Love (첫사랑)" (Inst.)		Nam Hye-seung; Park Jin-ho		4:07
Total length:					8:14

=== Part 2 ===
Released on March 7, 2026
No.	Title	Lyrics	Music	Artist	Length
1.	"My Heart, To You (네게 뛰는 중)"	Nam Hye-seung; Park Jin-ho	Nam Hye-seung; Park Jin-ho	Rothy	3:50
2.	"My Heart, To You (네게 뛰는 중)" (Inst.)		Nam Hye-seung; Park Jin-ho		3:50
Total length:					7:40

=== Part 3 ===
Released on March 13, 2026
No.	Title	Lyrics	Music	Artist	Length
1.	"Hidden Words (빈말)"	Nam Hye-seung; Park Jin-ho	Nam Hye-seung; Park Jin-ho	Sole	4:19
2.	"Hidden Words (빈말)" (Inst.)		Nam Hye-seung; Park Jin-ho		4:19
Total length:					8:38

=== Part 4 ===
Released on March 14, 2026
No.	Title	Lyrics	Music	Artist	Length
1.	"Love Spark"	Nam Hye-seung; Park Jin-ho	Nam Hye-seung; Park Jin-ho	O.When	3:50
2.	"Love Spark" (Inst.)		Nam Hye-seung; Park Jin-ho		3:50
Total length:					7:40

=== Part 5 ===
Released on March 20, 2026
No.	Title	Lyrics	Music	Artist	Length
1.	"Rekindling Memories (기억속 켜진불)"	Nam Hye-seung; Park Jin-ho	Nam Hye-seung; Park Jin-ho	Soobin	4:24
2.	"Rekindling Memories (기억속 켜진불)" (Inst.)		Nam Hye-seung; Park Jin-ho		4:24
Total length:					8:48

=== Part 6 ===
Released on March 21, 2026
No.	Title	Lyrics	Music	Artist	Length
1.	"Somewhere Only We Know (우리만 아는 시간)"	Nam Hye-seung; Kim Kyung-hee	Nam Hye-seung; Kim Kyung-hee	Kim Suyoung	4:16
2.	"Somewhere Only We Know (우리만 아는 시간)" (Inst.)		Nam Hye-seung; Kim Kyung-hee		4:16
Total length:					8:32

=== Part 7 ===
Released on March 27, 2026
No.	Title	Lyrics	Music	Artist	Length
1.	"Shining (샤이닝)"	Nam Hye-seung; Kim Kyung-hee	Nam Hye-seung; Kim Kyung-hee	Kim Pu-reum	3:45
2.	"Shining (샤이닝)" (Inst.)		Nam Hye-seung; Kim Kyung-hee		3:45
Total length:					7:30

=== Part 8 ===
Released on March 28, 2026
No.	Title	Lyrics	Music	Artist	Length
1.	"I'm Fine, Really (잘지내)"	Nam Hye-seung; Park Jin-ho	Nam Hye-seung; Park Jin-ho	Ra.D	3:36
2.	"I'm Fine, Really (잘지내)" (Inst.)		Nam Hye-seung; Park Jin-ho		3:36
Total length:					7:12

After releasing eight songs during the broadcast, the full soundtrack was released on April 3, 2026, adding two new tracks and thirty-one instrumentals. The musical direction was entrusted to Nam Hye-seung, who collaborated with composers Park Sang-hee, Park Jin-ho, Jeon Jeong-hoon, Jo Mi-ra, Go Eun-jeong, Jo Han-na, Lee So-young, and Kim Kyung-hee.

== Viewership ==
The first episode recorded a 2.1% audience share, which declined as the show continued to air, reaching 0.8% by the eighth episode, the lowest rating ever achieved by a Friday night series on JTBC.

Still Shining : South Korea viewers per episode (thousands)

Season	Episode number									
Season	1	2	3	4	5	6	7	8	9	10
1	446	N/A	N/A	N/A	N/A	N/A	N/A	N/A	N/A	N/A

Source: Audience measurement performed nationwide by Nielsen Korea.

Average TV viewership ratings
Ep.	Original broadcast date	Average audience share (Nielsen Korea)	
Ep.	Original broadcast date	Nationwide	Seoul
1	March 6, 2026	2.1% (11th)	2.090% (8th)
2	March 6, 2026	1.7% (19th)	N/A
3	March 13, 2026	1.2% (21st)	N/A
4	March 13, 2026	1.2% (21st)	N/A
5	March 20, 2026	1.1% (24th)	N/A
6	March 20, 2026	0.9% (24th)	N/A
7	March 27, 2026	1.1% (24th)	N/A
8	March 27, 2026	0.8% (24th)	N/A
9	April 3, 2026	0.8% (29th)	N/A
10	April 3, 2026	0.8% (29th)	N/A
Average		1.2%	— (Note: Due to multiple unpublished ratings, the exact average rating is unknown.)
In the table above, the blue numbers represent the lowest ratings and the red numbers represent the highest ratings.; N/A denotes ratings that were not published.; This drama aired on a cable channel/pay TV which normally has a relatively smaller audience compared to free-to-air TV/public broadcasters (KBS, SBS, MBC, and EBS).

== Reception ==
Still Shining received mixed reviews. Jo I-eum of Ize complimented the series, highlighting its direction "that delicately captures the temperature of the seasons in every scene," the script that meticulously builds the textures of relationships, and Park Jin-young's emotional performance, stating that the combination of these three elements was not flashy, but bound to linger. For Lee Sook-myung of Vogue Korea, the series poses questions that make viewers reflect on relationships, while Oh Soo-kyung of Cine21 felt that it dealt with the light and darkness of life and love, filling the empty spaces of the narrative with emotions. On the other hand, Choi Soo-bin of The Fact deemed the plot frustrating and repetitive in its use of classic melodrama devices, which prevented viewers from engaging with the series' strength, alas its discreet depiction of the characters' inner lives and relationships.

Viewers filed complaints with the Korea Communications Standards Commission about two scenes in episodes 7 and 8 showing characters driving after drinking alcohol.
