= MeloMance =

South Korean indie folk band

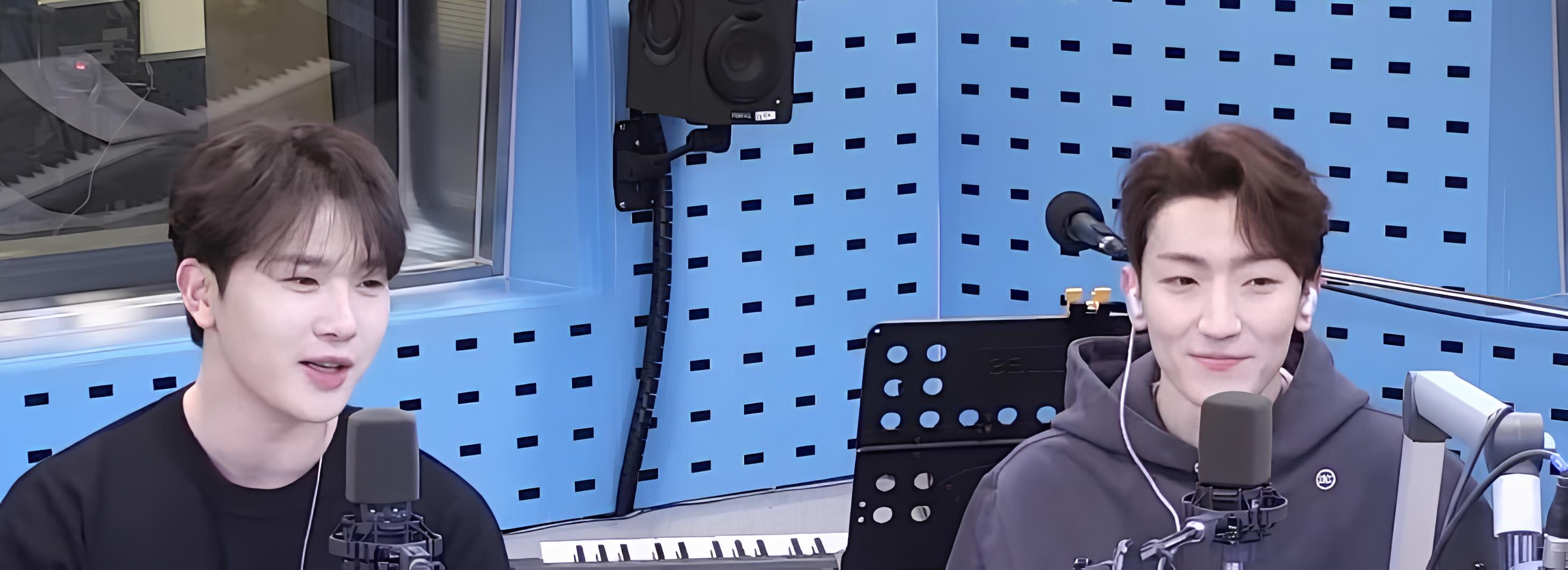
- MeloMance at Wendy's Youngstreet in January 2023; Kim Min-seok (left) and Jeong Dong-hwan (right)

Background information
- Origin: Seoul, South Korea
- Genres: Indie folk
- Years active: 2015–present
- Label: Abyss Company
- Members: Kim Min-seok; Jeong Dong-hwan

MeloMance (Korean: 멜로망스) is a South Korean indie folk duo formed by Heaven Company in 2013. The group's name is composed of two words, "melo" and "romance". They debuted on March 10, 2015, with the extended play Sentimental.

== Members ==
- Kim Min-seok (김민석) – vocals
- Jeong Dong-hwan (정동환) – piano

== Discography ==
=== Extended plays ===
Title	EP details	Peak chart positions	Sales
Title	EP details	KOR	Sales
Sentimental	Released: March 10, 2015; Label: Heaven Company, TSN Company; Formats: CD, digital download	—	—N/a
Romantic	Released: February 17, 2016; Label: Heaven Company, TSN Company; Formats: CD, digital download	—	—N/a
Sunshine	Released: December 6, 2016; Label: Mint Paper, NHN Entertainment; Formats: CD, digital download	46	—N/a
Moonlight	Released: July 10, 2017; Label: Mint Paper, LOEN Entertainment; Formats: CD, digital download	48	—N/a
The Fairy Tale	Released: July 3, 2018; Label: Mint Paper, LOEN Entertainment; Formats: CD, digital download	24	KOR: 1,360
Festival	Released: November 6, 2019; Label: Mint Paper, Label GHS; Formats: CD, digital download	65	—N/a
Invitation	Released: May 3, 2022; Label: Abyss Company, Kakao Entertainment; Formats: CD, digital download	59	—N/a
Romance Express	Released: April 29, 2025; Label: Abyss Company, Kakao Entertainment; Formats: CD, digital download	49	KOR: 1,500

=== Singles ===
Title	Year	Peak chart positions		Sales (DL)	Album
Title	Year	KOR Circle	KOR Hot	Sales (DL)	Album
"That Night" (그 밤)	2015	—	*	—N/a	Sentimental
"Dear You Who Love Me" (나를 사랑하는 그대에게)	2016	—	*	—N/a	Romantic
"I Like Jealousy" (질투가 좋아)	2016	—	*	—N/a	Sunshine
"Gift" (선물)	2017	2	2	KOR: 5,000,000	Moonlight
"Just Friends" (욕심)	2018	6	4	—N/a	Non-album single
"Tale" (동화)	2018	4	5	—N/a	The Fairy Tale
"You&I" (인사)	2019	4	—	—N/a	Non-album singles
"Festival" (축제)	2019	53	—	—N/a	Non-album singles
"Go Back" (고백)	2021	17	9	—N/a	Non-album singles
"Invitation" (초대)	2022	69	*	—N/a	Invitation
"A Shining Day" (찬란한 하루)	2023	26	*	—N/a	Non-album singles
"Between Love and Friendship" (사랑과 우정사이)	2024	88	*	—N/a	Non-album singles
"Surprise On Any Day" (아무 날의 서프라이즈)	2025	—	*	—N/a	Romance Express
"—" denotes releases that did not chart. "*" denotes the chart did not exist at that time.

=== Collaboration ===
Title	Year	Peak chart positions		Album
Title	Year	KOR Circle	KOR Hot	Album
"Page 0" (with Taeyeon)	2018	38	42	SM Station X 0
"Miracle" (안부) (with Wendy)	2023	170	*	SM Station Season 4
"—" denotes releases that did not chart. "*" denotes the chart did not exist at that time.

=== Soundtrack appearances ===
Title	Year	Peak chart positions			Sales	Certifications (Note: In April 2018, Gaon Chart introduced music recording certifications for albums, downloads and streamings.)	Album
Title	Year	KOR Circle	KOR Hot	US Bub.	Sales	Certifications	Album
"Deepen" (짙어져)	2017	22	43	—	KOR: 252,552	—N/a	Yellow OST
"I Want to Love" (사랑하고 싶게 돼)	2017	—	—	—	KOR: 18,273	—N/a	Because This Is My First Life OST
"Not Too Distant Day" (아주 멀지 않은 날에)	2017	66	—	—	KOR: 25,884	—N/a	20th Century Boy and Girl OST
"I Will Be by Your Side" (네 옆에 있을게)	2018	93	—	—	—N/a	—N/a	A Korean Odyssey OST
"You"	2018	4	5	—	—N/a	KMCA: Platinum	Two Yoo Project Sugar Man OST
"Good Day" (좋은 날)	2018	42	44	—	—N/a	—N/a	Mr. Sunshine OST
"Glass" (유리)	2018	—	—	—	—N/a	—N/a	Why OST
"Our Story" (우리의 이야기)	2021	97	61	—	—N/a	—N/a	Yumi's Cells OST
"Better For Me" (그게 더 편할 것 같아)	2021	42	98	—	—N/a	—N/a	Nth Romance OST
"Love, Maybe" (사랑인가 봐)	2022	4	6	19	—N/a	—N/a	Business Proposal OST (Note: Later included in the soundtrack of KPop Demon Hunters)
"Happy Song"	2022	91	*	—	—N/a	—N/a	Our Blues OST
"Link" (링크)	2022	—	*	—	—N/a	—N/a	Link: Eat, Love, Kill OST
"—" denotes releases that did not chart. "*" denotes a chart did not exist at that time.

=== Music videos ===
Title	Year	Director(s)	Ref.
"I Like Jealousy"	2016	Kim Kyonghwan (M Pictures)	
"Gift"	2017	Kim Kyonghwan (M Pictures)	
"Just Friends"	2018	Jeong Jooyoung (Bowie Studios)	
"Tale"	2018	H3 Production	
"Page 0" (with Kim Tae-yeon)	2018	Koh Inkon (Better Taste Studio)	

== Filmography ==
=== Drama ===
Year	Title	Role	Notes	Ref.
2022	Business Proposal	as themselves	Cameo (Episode 3)	

== Accolades ==
=== Awards and nominations ===
Name of the award ceremony, year presented, award category, nominee(s) and the result of the award
Award ceremony	Year	Category	Nominee(s)/work(s)	Result	Ref.
APAN Star Awards	2022	Best Original Soundtrack	"Love, Maybe"	Nominated	
Gaon Chart Music Awards	2018	Indie Discovery of the Year	MeloMance	Won	
Golden Disc Awards	2018	Digital Bonsang	MeloMance	Nominated	
Golden Disc Awards	2018	Global Popularity Award	MeloMance	Nominated	
Golden Disc Awards	2019	Digital Daesang	"Tale"	Nominated	
Golden Disc Awards	2019	Popularity Award	Melomance	Nominated	
MAMA Awards	2018	Best Vocal Performance – Group	"Tale"	Nominated	
MAMA Awards	2022	Best OST	"Love, Maybe"	Won	
MBC Plus X Genie Music Awards	2018	Song of the Year	"Deepen"	Nominated	
MBC Plus X Genie Music Awards	2018	Song of the Year	"Tale"	Nominated	
MBC Plus X Genie Music Awards	2018	Best Selling Artist of the Year	MeloMance	Nominated	
MBC Plus X Genie Music Awards	2018	Vocal Track (Male)	"Tale"	Nominated	
MBC Plus X Genie Music Awards	2018	OST Award	"Deepen"	Nominated	
MBC Plus X Genie Music Awards	2018	Genie Music Popularity Award	MeloMance	Nominated	
Melon Music Awards	2017	Best Indie Award	"Gift"	Won	
Melon Music Awards	2018	Hot Trend Award	"Page 0" (with Taeyeon)	Nominated	
Melon Music Awards	2018	Best Indie Award	"Tale"	Won	
Melon Music Awards	2019	Best Indie Award	"You & I"	Won	
Melon Music Awards	2022	Best OST	"Love, Maybe"	Won	
Seoul Music Awards	2018	Bonsang Award	MeloMance	Nominated	
Seoul Music Awards	2018	Popularity Award	MeloMance	Nominated	
Seoul Music Awards	2018	Hallyu Special Award	MeloMance	Nominated	
Seoul Music Awards	2023	OST Award	MeloMance	Won	

=== State honors ===
Name of country or organization, year given, and name of honor or award
Country or Organization	Year	Honor or Award	Ref.
South Korea (Note: Honors are given at the Korean Popular Culture and Arts Awards, arranged by the Korea Creative Content Agency and hosted by the Ministry of Culture, Sports and Tourism. They are awarded to those who have contributed to the arts and South Korea's pop culture.)	2023	Minister of Culture, Sports and Tourism Commendation	
