= MBC =

MBC may refer to:

== Broadcasting ==
- Major Broadcasting Cable Network, renamed to Black Family Channel
- Marshalls Broadcasting Company, the national broadcaster of Marshall Islands
- Malawi Broadcasting Corporation, a Malawian state-run radio company
- Mauritius Broadcasting Corporation, a public broadcaster of the Republic of Mauritius
- MBC (My Binge Channel), a television channel in the United Kingdom
- MBC Networks, Sri Lankan media company
- MBC Group, a Saudi Arabian media conglomerate broadcasting in the Middle East and North Africa
- MBC Media Group, a Philippine multimedia company
- Minaminihon Broadcasting, a Japanese commercial broadcaster
- Missinipi Broadcasting Corporation, a radio network in Canada
- Munhwa Broadcasting Corporation, a public South Korean commercial broadcaster
  - MBC TV, a television channel from Seoul, South Korea
  - MBC News Now, a television channel from Seoul, South Korea
- Museum of Broadcast Communications, a museum located in Chicago, Illinois
- My Broadcasting Corporation, a private Canadian broadcasting company

== Education ==
- Mary Baldwin College, in Staunton, Virginia, US
- Master of Business Communication, an academic degree
- Matthew Boulton College, in Birmingham, England
- Minneapolis Business College, located in Roseville, Minnesota, US
- Morris Brown College, in Atlanta, Georgia, US

== Entertainment ==
- Miami Boys Choir, a Jewish contemporary music choir
- Monster Buster Club, a 3D animated series produced by Marathon and Image Entertainment Corporation

== Places ==
- Massachusetts Bay Colony, 1630–1691 English colony in North America
- Media Business Centre, an office building in Warsaw, Poland

== Science and technology ==
- 4-MBC, 4-methylbenzylidene camphor
- MBC-550, a personal computer produced by Sanyo
- Main-belt comet
- Metastatic breast cancer
- Meteor burst communications
- Minimum bactericidal concentration
- Myoblast city, a Drosophila melanogaster gene

== Sports ==
- Manchester Baseball Club, a British baseball club
- Midwest Basketball Conference, 1935–1937, changed its name to the National Basketball League
- Mitteldeutscher BC, a German basketball club

== Other uses ==
- Maidstone Borough Council, the second level local authority for the Borough of Maidstone in Kent, United Kingdom
- Makati Business Club, a Filipino private non-stock, non-profit business association
- Manado Boulevard Carnaval, an annual fashion carnival in Manado, Indonesia
- Mathieu Bock-Côté (born 1980), Canadian academic and writer
- Mesoamerican Biological Corridor, an international conservation initiative for biodiversity protection across southern Mexico and Central America
- Metropolitan Borough Council, the authority for a type of local government district in England
- Michigan Brewing Company, in Webberville, Michigan, United States
- Ministères baptistes canadiens; Canadian Baptist Ministries
- Missouri Baptist Convention, a religious organization in the United States
- Transports de la région Morges-Bière-Cossonay, a transport company in Switzerland
- Mutual Benefits Corporation, an investment sales company that operated a huge ponzi scheme
- Metaplastic breast cancer
