= List of awards and nominations received by Park Eun-bin =

Park Eun-bin awards and nominations
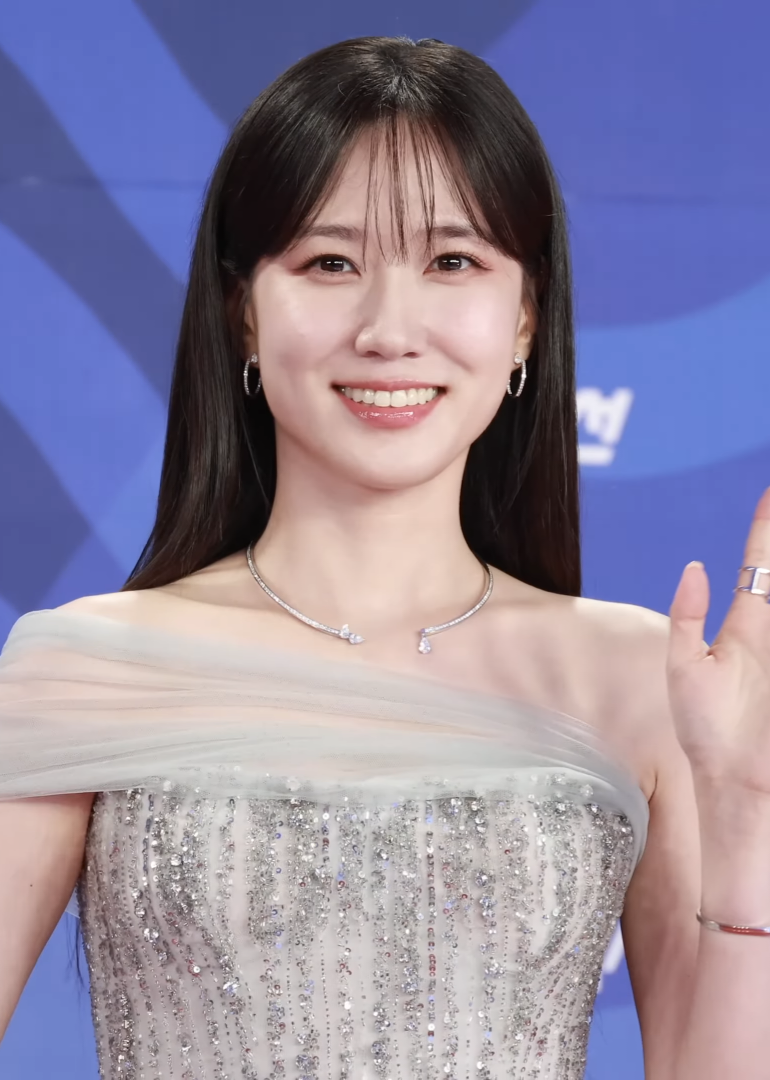
- Park in 2025
Awards and nominations
Award	Wins	Nominations
APAN Star Awards	1	3
Asia Artist Awards	0	1
Asia Contents Awards	1	1
Baeksang Arts Awards	1	3
Blue Dragon Series Awards	0	2
Cine21 Film Awards	1	1
CJ ENM Visionary	1	1
Consumer Rights Day Awards	1	1
Critics' Choice Awards	1	1
Grimae Awards	1	1
Global OTT Awards	1	1
KBS Drama Awards	4	5
Kinolights Awards	1	1
KOPA & NIKON Press Photo Awards	1	1
Korean Broadcasters' Night Awards	1	1
Korea Broadcasting Prizes	1	1
Korea Drama Awards	0	2
Korean Popular Culture and Arts Awards	1	1
MBC Drama Awards	0	2
SBS Drama Awards	2	5
Seoul International Drama Awards	1	2
The Star Awards	1	1
TVING Awards	1	1
Korean Popular Culture and Arts Awards	1	1

Totals (Note: Certain award groups do not simply award one winner. They acknowledge several different recipients, have runners-up, and have third place. Since this is a specific recognition and is different from losing an award, runner-up mentions are considered wins in this award tally. For simplification and to avoid errors, each award in this list has been presumed to have had a prior nomination.)
- Wins: 23
- Nominations: 39

Park Eun-bin (Korean: 박은빈) is a South Korean actress who has received various accolades throughout her career, including the Grand Prize (Daesang) in the Television category at the 59th Baeksang Arts Awards for her portrayal of the titular character in Extraordinary Attorney Woo (2022). Over the course of her career, she has also received a Prime Minister's Commendation at the Korean Popular Culture and Arts Awards and multiple wins for Best Actress at ceremonies such as the KBS Drama Awards, the SBS Drama Awards, and the Asia Contents Awards. Across her filmography, which includes roles in The King's Affection, Hot Stove League, and Do You Like Brahms? she has earned critical praise, securing numerous wins and nominations.

Park was named Gallup Korea's Television Actor of the Year, Sisa Journal's Cultural Person of the Year, and Cultura's Drama Icon of 2022. She also made her first entry into Forbes Korea Power Celebrity in 2023, placing 11th.

== Awards and nominations ==
Name of the award ceremony, year presented, category, nominee of the award, and the result of the nomination
Award ceremony	Year	Category	Nominee(s) / Work(s)	Result	Ref.
APAN Star Awards	2020	Excellence Award, Actress in a Miniseries	Hot Stove League; Do You Like Brahms?	Nominated	
APAN Star Awards	2022	Popularity Star Award, Actress	Extraordinary Attorney Woo	Won	
APAN Star Awards	2022	Top Excellence Award, Actress in a Miniseries	The King's Affection; Extraordinary Attorney Woo	Nominated	
Asia Artist Awards	2026	Popularity Award – Actress	Park Eun-bin	Pending	
Asia Contents Awards	2022	Best Lead Actress	Extraordinary Attorney Woo	Won	
Baeksang Arts Awards	2022	Best Actress – Television	The King's Affection	Nominated	
Baeksang Arts Awards	2023	Grand Prize – Television	Extraordinary Attorney Woo	Won	
Baeksang Arts Awards	2023	Best Actress – Television	Extraordinary Attorney Woo	Nominated	
Blue Dragon Series Awards	2025	Best Actress	Hyper Knife	Nominated	
Blue Dragon Series Awards	2025	Popular Star — Actress	Park Eun-bin	Nominated	
Cine21 Film Awards	2022	Actress of the Year – Series	Extraordinary Attorney Woo	Won	
CJ ENM Visionary	2023	2023 Visionary	Park Eun-bin	Won	
Consumer Rights Day Awards	2022	Actor of the Year - Series	Extraordinary Attorney Woo	Won	
Critics' Choice Awards Asian Pacific Cinema & Television	2022	Rising Star Award for TV	Extraordinary Attorney Woo	Won	
Global OTT Awards	2025	Best Actress	Hyper Knife	Won	
Grimae Awards	2020	Best Actress	Hot Stove League	Won	
iMBC Awards (Note: iMBC Awards, hosted by iMBC Entertainment, MBC Group's only entertainment news outlet, honors artists and actors with outstanding achievements in the industry.)	2026	Best Actress	The Wonderfools	Pending	
KBS Drama Awards	2009	Best Young Actress	The Iron Empress	Won	
KBS Drama Awards	2018	Excellence Award, Actress in a Miniseries	The Ghost Detective	Nominated	
KBS Drama Awards	2021	Best Couple Award	The King's Affection (with Rowoon)	Won	
KBS Drama Awards	2021	Popularity Award, Actress	The King's Affection	Won	
KBS Drama Awards	2021	Top Excellence Award, Actress	The King's Affection	Won	
Kinolights Awards (Note: Award winners are selected by combining trend data, voting results for Kinolight users, and Kinolights ratings)	2022	Actress of the Year (Domestic)	Extraordinary Attorney Woo	Won	
KOPA & NIKON Press Photo Awards	2024	Photogenic of the Year	Park Eun-bin	Won	
Korea Broadcasting Prizes	2022	Best Actor	The King's Affection	Won	
Korea Drama Awards	2017	Best New Actress	Father, I'll Take Care of You	Nominated	
Korea Drama Awards	2022	Grand Prize (Daesang)	Extraordinary Attorney Woo	Nominated	
Korean Broadcasters' Night Awards	2023	Actor of the Year	Park Eun-bin	Won	
MBC Drama Awards	2013	Best New Actress	Hur Jun, The Original Story	Nominated	
MBC Drama Awards	2017	Excellence Award, Actress in a Weekend Drama	Father, I'll Take Care of You	Nominated	
SBS Drama Awards	2007	Best Young Actress	Catching Up with Gangnam Moms	Nominated	
SBS Drama Awards	2017	Excellence Award, Actress in a Wednesday-Thursday Drama	Judge vs. Judge	Nominated	
SBS Drama Awards	2020	Best Couple Award	Do You Like Brahms? (with Kim Min-jae)	Won	
SBS Drama Awards	2020	Top Excellence Award, Actress in a Miniseries Fantasy/Romance Drama	Do You Like Brahms?	Won	
SBS Drama Awards	2020	Excellence Award, Actress in a Miniseries Genre/Action Drama	Hot Stove League	Nominated	
Seoul International Drama Awards	2023	Outstanding Asian Star	Park Eun-bin	Won	
Seoul International Drama Awards	2026	Outstanding Asian Star	Park Eun-bin	Nominated	
The Star Awards	2022	Actor of the Year	Extraordinary Attorney Woo	Won	
TVING Awards	2023	Tear of the Year	Castaway Diva (with Kim Hyo-jin)	Won	

== State honors ==
Name of country and organization, year given, and name of honor
Country	Organization	Year	Honor or Award	Ref.
South Korea	Korean Popular Culture and Arts Awards (Note: Honors are given at the Korean Popular Culture and Arts Awards, arranged by the Korea Creative Content Agency and hosted by the Ministry of Culture, Sports and Tourism. They are awarded to those who have contributed to the arts and South Korea's pop culture.)	2023	Prime Minister's Commendation	

== Listicles ==
Name of publisher, year listed, name of listicle, and placement
Publisher	Year	Listicle	Placement	Ref.
Cine21	2021	New Actress to watch out for in 2022	6th (Note: Tied with Go Min-si, Moon Ga-young, Keum Sae-rok, Joo Hyun-young, Park Gyu-young, Lee Soo-kyung, Roh Yoon-seo, Gong Seung-yeon, Lee Se-young, IU, Shin Hyun-been, Park Ji-hu, Han So-hee, Jung Ji-so, Bang Min-ah, Jeon Jong-seo, Roh Jeong-eui)	
Cultura	2022	Drama Icon	1st	
Forbes Korea	2023	Power Celebrity 40	11th	
Forbes Korea	2024	Power Celebrity 40	31th	
Gallup Korea	2022	Television Actor of the Year	1st	
Gallup Korea	2023	Television Actor of the Year	2nd	
Sisa Journal	2023	Cultural Person of the Year	1st	
