= Spooky in Love =

2026 South Korean television series

- Promotional poster
- Hangul: 오싹한 연애
- Hanja: 오싹한 戀愛
- Lit.: Chilling Romance
- RR: Ossakhan yeonae
- MR: Ossakhan yŏnae
- Genre: Romantic comedy; Horror
- Based on: Spellbound by Hwang In-ho
- Written by: Choi Jung-mi
- Directed by: Lee Min-soo
- Starring: Park Eun-bin; Yang Se-jong; Ong Seong-wu
- Country of origin: South Korea
- Original language: Korean
- No. of episodes: 12

Production
- Production companies: CJ ENM; CJ ENM Studios; B.pic; Sangsang Film

Original release
- Network: tvN
- Release: July 18 – August 23, 2026

Spooky in Love (Korean: 오싹한 연애) is a 2026 South Korean horror romantic comedy television series written by Choi Jung-mi, directed by Lee Min-soo and starring Park Eun-bin, Yang Se-jong, and Ong Seong-wu. Based on the 2011 film Spellbound, the series tells the story of a chaebol heiress who can see ghosts and causes anyone she touches to see them as well, and a prosecutor whose greatest fear is ghosts. It aired on tvN from July 18, to August 23, 2026, every Saturday and Sunday at 21:10 (KST). It is also available for streaming on Netflix.

== Synopsis ==
Spooky in Love follows Cheon Yeo-ri, a chaebol heiress and hotel CEO who secretly sees ghosts and is haunted nightly by the spirits of people who died unjustly, and Ma Kang-wook, a prosecutor who investigates unsolved murder cases. After joining forces to solve paranormal cases, the two develop romantic feelings for each other.

== Cast and characters ==
=== Main ===
- Park Eun-bin as Cheon Yeo-ri

Heiress to a major national conglomerate and CEO of the Reina Hotel. She was a realistic girl who didn't believe in ghosts or the afterlife, but after a yacht accident, she began seeing ghosts. Driven by a desire not to harm others and the need to remain in the family's succession structure, she chose to isolate herself from everyone. She spent nearly a decade living in solitude, but the problem persisted because ghosts visited her from time to time. One day, while following one of them to the place where they had abandoned its body, she met prosecutor Ma Kang-wook. She eventually makes a deal with him.

- Yang Se-jong as Ma Kang-wook

A prosecutor in the Seoul District Prosecutors' Office. He was demoted to the cold case unit after charging a politician's son with murder. While investigating an abandoned body, he repeatedly encounters Yeo-ri in the woods, which leads him to suspect her and learn of her secret.

- Ong Seong-wu as Kang Min-hwan

Heir to the prestigious Korean hotel group CL Hotel & Resort Group and CEO of the CL Raymond Hotel. He appears polite and reasonable, but is described as ambitious and insecure. He seeks recognition and is willing to manipulate or harm others, including family members, to achieve it.

=== Supporting ===
==== Yeo-ri's family ====
- Jo Hye-joo as Cheon Ha-ri

Yeo-ri's younger cousin, although she is not related by blood to President Baek Gyeong-ja, the head of the group, which puts her at a disadvantage in the race for succession. Because of this, she feels an inferiority complex towards Yeo-ri, whose position she covets.

- Ye Soo-jung as Baek Gyeong-ja

Yeo-ri's grandmother and president of Reina Hotel & Resort, Korea's leading hotel chain. Yeo-ri is her only blood relative.

- Baek Ji-won as Ok Gye-hee

Daughter-in-law of President Baek Gyeong-ja, and mother of Dong-jun and Ha-ri. She is the director of the Cheon Gallery. Her late husband was not her mother-in-law's biological son, but while President Baek, the conglomerate's founder and Gyeong-ja's husband, was alive, she enjoyed his immense favor and, therefore, the full support of the group's directors.

- Lee Dal as Cheon Dong-jun

Yeo-ri's cousin and Ha-ri's older brother. An ambitious, straightforward man with a knack for intrigue, he craves success and ostentation.

==== Prosecutor's office staff ====
- Lee Chang-hoon as Go Pil-dong

An investigator at the Seoul District Prosecutors' Office.

- Kim Min-ho as Son Hyeong-min
- Im Chae-young as Im Seo-hyeon

==== Min-hwan's family ====
- Kim Seo-ra as Song Hee-won

Vice Chairman of the CL Hotel & Resort Group. She were Min-hwan and Ji-hwan's mother.

==== Others ====
- Kim Do-wan as Park Seung-jae

Ha-ri's fiancé and a professional golfer. He is the only son of one of the leading presidential contenders. He was acquitted in the first instance in the trial where Kang-wook accused him of murder, but in the aftermath of that trial, he is consumed by an uncontrollable desire to take revenge on the prosecutor.

- Lee Jun-hyeok as Bong Ji-wook

General Manager of the Reina Hotel and Yeo-ri's closest confidant.

- Kim Han-na as Uhm Ji-soo

Yeo-ri's closest secretary.

- Kim Min-chul as Kang Ji-hwan

A ghost with the appearance of a young man who haunts Yeo-ri.

- Cha Mi-kyung as Paeng Myo-sun

Kang-wook's grandmother.

== Production ==
=== Development ===
Spooky in Love is a remake of the 2011 film Spellbound written and directed by Hwang In-ho. The series is directed by Lee Min-soo, who helmed Resident Playbook (2025), written by Choi Jung-mi, and produced by CJ ENM, CJ ENM Studios, B.pic, and the original movie's production company Sangsang Film.

=== Casting ===
In August 2025, Namoo Actors and Zion Entertainment confirmed that Park Eun-bin and Yang Se-jong had been offered the lead roles, respectively. Two months later, Fantagio confirmed Ong Seong-wu had received an offer and was positively considering it. By November 2025, the casting of the series was completed and filming was already underway, with Ong Seong-wu set to begin filming on November 27. The same month, Park and Yang's appearances were officially confirmed. In comparison to the original version, the series introduces a new character, Kang Min-hwan, played by Ong Seong-wu, who serves as the central figure in the conflict that drives the plot.

== Episodes ==
No.	Original release date
1	July 18, 2026
Cheon Yeo-ri (Park Eun-bin), a wealthy hotel CEO living in complete isolation after a traumatic yacht accident left her haunted by unjust spirits. The episode follows Yeo-ri as she discreetly guides authorities to a hidden body at the Haedam Reservoir, leading to multiple unexpected run-ins with Ma Gang-wook (Yang Se-jong), an upright prosecutor investigating cold cases. After a high-stakes encounter near a convenience store leaves Gang-wook deeply suspicious, he tracks Yeo-ri down to the Reina Hotel, where the two begin to unravel how a suspect tampered with a local murder scene.
2	July 19, 2026
Cheon Yeo-ri (Park Eun-bin) as she is cornered at the Reina Hotel by Prosecutor Ma Gang-wook (Yang Se-jong), who remains skeptical when she attributes her discovery of the reservoir body to a ghost. As Gang-wook analyzes security footage and Yeo-ri follows her own supernatural leads, the two independently uncover how a suspect used the hotel's shared balconies to conceal a murder, culminating in his public arrest. The narrative then shifts to Jeju Island, where Yeo-ri attends business negotiations and Gang-wook attends a wedding. While exploring a seaside cliff, a spiritual pull causes Yeo-ri to fall into the ocean; Gang-wook rescues her, but the two immediately discover the body of a missing young designer, setting up a new investigation.
3	July 25, 2026
The episode starts immediately after Cheon Yeo-ri (Park Eun-bin) and Prosecutor Ma Gang-wook (Yang Se-jong) fall into the sea in Jeju, where authorities recover the body of a missing designer and arrest the culprit. Back in Seoul, Yeo-ri faces mounting pressure when her grandmother issues an ultimatum to marry within two months to secure her hotel succession rights and silence public rumors. Meanwhile, a demoted Gang-wook crosses paths with a heavily intoxicated Yeo-ri at a restaurant. In a moment of vulnerability, Yeo-ri removes her protective gloves and touches his bare hand, inadvertently passing on her supernatural affliction. The episode concludes with a shocked Gang-wook beginning to see ghosts, deeply entangling his life with Yeo-ri's haunted reality.
4	July 26, 2026
Dealing with the fallout of Prosecutor Ma Gang-wook (Yang Se-jong) inheriting Cheon Yeo-ri's (Park Eun-bin) supernatural curse, Gang-wook struggles with sleep paralysis and terrorized by sudden visions of spirits. He finally understands the lifelong isolation and burden Yeo-ri has endured. The two team up to help a child ghost, whose guidance leads them to a devastating car crash site, proving to Gang-wook how Yeo-ri consistently uncovered past crime scenes. As Gang-wook learns coping mechanisms to survive a month with the affliction, the plot thickens back in Seoul when the newly released suspect Seung-jae targets Yeo-ri. The episode ends on a shocking cliffhanger as Gang-wook rushes to save Yeo-ri from a staged kidnapping, only to be violently struck down by Seung-jae's car.
5	August 1, 2026
Cheon Yeo-ri (Park Eun-bin) discovers that Prosecutor Ma Gang-wook (Yang Se-jong) survived being struck by the car, hearing his heartbeat when she embraces him. Though he is hospitalized overnight, Yeo-ri insists they keep their distance, fearing for his safety. Meanwhile, political and corporate tensions rise: fake news breaks out linking Ye to a forced engagement with CEO Kang Min-hwan (planted by her grandmother), while Gang-wook looks into a potential slush fund and art smuggling ring tied to the Reina Hotel through prosecutor Im Seo-yeon. At an elite museum artifact-unveiling event for a 300-year-old Joseon-era love letter, the display case suddenly shatters, and Yeo-ri spots the ghost of a historical painter named Dowon. Fueled by mutual jealousy over each other's apparent romantic dates (Min-hwan and Seo-yeon), Gang-wook and Yeo-ri bicker through a modern murder case before finally agreeing to team up. The episode closes on a pivotal note as they officially decide to tackle the historical cold case of the 300-year-old love letter together.
6	August 2, 2026
Cheon Yeo-ri (Park Eun-bin) and Prosecutor Ma Gang-wook (Yang Se-jong) delve into the historical cold case tied to the 300-year-old Joseon-era love letter. Guided by the spirit of the painter Dowon, the duo investigates a series of modern thefts linked to illicit artifact smuggling, which ultimately leads them to uncover corruption reaching deep into the corporate board of the Reina Hotel. As they work closely together, their professional partnership deepens, and the lingering romantic tension between them grows harder to ignore. The episode concludes with Yeo-ri and Gang-wook cornering a key smuggler, only to discover a hidden connection between the modern artifacts and the dark secrets surrounding Yeo-ri's family past.
7	August 8, 2026
Cheon Yeo-ri unexpectedly announces her engagement to Prosecutor Ma Gang-wook at a family dinner to protect herself from a forced marriage with CEO Kang Min-hwan. During dinner, Gang-wook firmly supports the ruse by declaring his genuine feelings for Yeo-ri, though Min-hwan remains deeply suspicious and begins digging into Gang-wook's background. Meanwhile, the duo successfully wraps up the 300-year-old cold case when the historical gisaeng's remains are found under a camelia tree, allowing the spirits to finally find peace. As Yeo-ri and Gang-wook spend more time together on simulated "dates" to make their relationship convincing, their professional partnership genuinely begins to blossom into real romance, culminating in an earnest confession from Gang-wook. However, corporate dangers loom as family members plot to oust Yeo-ri using financial discrepancies at the Cheon Gallery. The episode ends on a chilling supernatural twist when Yeo-ri calls a designer from Sio Atelier, hears his voice on the phone, and simultaneously sees his ghost—revealing that the man operating the studio is actually his murderous twin brother impersonating him.
8	August 9, 2026
Cheon Yeo-ri (Park Eun-bin) and Prosecutor Ma Gang-wook (Yang Se-jong) directly into the terrifying trap of the Sio Atelier twin brothers. Realizing the man currently running the atelier is the murderous twin impersonating the real designer whose ghost Yeo-ri encountered, the duo races to stop him before he can claim another victim. While navigating this high-stakes confrontation, Gang-wook's protective instincts over Yeo-ri deepen, further solidifying their mutual romance amidst the chaos. Back at the Reina Hotel, corporate enemies continue to circle, and CEO Kang Min-hwan uses the ongoing police investigation to pressure Yeo-ri's board position. The episode ends with the twin's crimes coming to light, but a final twist reveals that the surviving brother has left behind a cryptic message threatening Yeo-ri's family legacy.
9	August 15, 2026
Cheon Yeo-ri and Prosecutor Ma Gang-wook face the fallout of the Sio Atelier case. While the murderous twin is apprehended, the cryptic message he left behind exposes a deep-seated financial conspiracy engineered by CEO Kang Min-hwan to take over the Reina Hotel. Backed by her supportive board allies and Gang-wook's legal expertise, Yeo-ri launches a counter-offensive to audit the hotel's accounts. Meanwhile, the romantic tension between Yeo-ri and Gang-wook reaches a boiling point during a late-night stakeout, culminating in their first official, genuine confession of love away from the public eye.
10	August 16, 2026
The corporate war intensifies as Kang Min-hwan escalates his hostile takeover attempts, utilizing planted evidence to freeze the Cheon family gallery assets. To clear her name and protect her legacy, Yeo-ri teams up with Gang-wook to trace a missing ledger tied to her late grandfather's accounts. Supernatural elements intersect with the investigation when the ghost of a former whistleblower guides them to hidden physical documents inside an abandoned archive room. Just as the couple secures the critical proof needed to expose Min-hwan's corruption, Gang-wook is abruptly ambushed by Min-hwan's corporate associates on his way back to deliver the evidence.
11	August 22, 2026
In the aftermath of the ambush, a terrified Yeo-ri rushes to Gang-wook's side and discovers he only suffered minor injuries. The attack pushes the couple to launch a final, all-out offensive against Min-hwan. Utilizing the recovered ledger, Gang-wook legally traps Min-hwan with charges of embezzlement, artifact smuggling, and corporate sabotage, leading to a dramatic public downfall and arrest at the Reina Hotel. With the corporate threats neutralized, Yeo-ri finally confronts her deep-seated trauma regarding the yacht accident, finding peace with the spirits that have haunted her life and accepting that her gift does not have to mean a life of total isolation.
12	August 23, 2026
Wrapping up the romantic and supernatural arcs of the story with Min-hwan behind bars and the Reina Hotel secure under Yeo-ri's leadership, she and Gang-wook celebrate a peaceful new chapter. The episode features a heart-warming flash-forward where Yeo-ri successfully balances her corporate duties with her unique ability, now using it to help lost spirits find closure rather than fearing it. The series concludes with a joyful, picturesque wedding ceremony attended by their families, trusted allies, and even a few cheerful ghostly well-wishers, cementing the couple's happy ending.

=== Filming ===
Principal photography began in November 2025. Eun-bin and Se-jong, were seen filming in various locations in Singapore, including Lau Pa Sat and Marina Bay Waterfront Promenade.

== Production and locations ==
Production for Spooky in Love took place between November 2025 and June 2026, utilizing a mix of domestic spots across South Korea and international locations to represent the characters' upscale corporate and travel lifestyles.

=== Filming locations ===
- Seoul, South Korea: The majority of the series was shot in and around Seoul, utilizing urban commercial districts, modern corporate backdrops, and traditional neighborhoods such as Bukchon-ro to provide traditional-meets-modern aesthetics for romantic sequences.
- Singapore: To capture the high-end international atmosphere fitting for a luxury hotel empire, the production traveled to Singapore in early 2026, filming at prominent landmarks including Lau Pa Sat, the Marina Bay Waterfront Promenade, East Coast Park, and Clarke Quay.
- Andong, North Gyeongsang Province: For regional travel scenes, the crew filmed at the Wolyeonggyo Bridge, a famous 387-meter wooden pedestrian bridge.

== Release ==
In late April 2026, Spooky in Love was confirmed to premiere on tvN in July 2026. The next month, the first poster was unveiled, and the series was confirmed to premiere on July 18, airing every Saturday and Sunday at 21:10 (KST). It is available for streaming on Netflix.

== Viewership ==
Spooky in Love : South Korea viewers per episode (millions)

Season	Episode number												Average
Season	1	2	3	4	5	6	7	8	9	10	11	12	Average
1	0.729	1.343	1.056	1.532	1.396	1.537	1.181	1.484	1.508	1.764	1.297	2.012	1.403

Source: Audience measurement performed nationwide by Nielsen Korea.

Average TV viewership ratings
Ep.	Original broadcast date	Average audience share (Nielsen Korea)	
Ep.	Original broadcast date	Nationwide	Seoul
1	July 18, 2026	3.049% (2nd)	3.211% (1st)
2	July 19, 2026	5.320% (1st)	5.383% (1st)
3	July 25, 2026	4.350% (1st)	4.321% (1st)
4	July 26, 2026	5.810% (1st)	5.746% (1st)
5	August 1, 2026	5.548% (1st)	5.637% (1st)
6	August 2, 2026	5.989% (1st)	5.577% (1st)
7	August 8, 2026	4.929% (1st)	4.653% (1st)
8	August 9, 2026	6.166% (1st)	6.155% (1st)
9	August 15, 2026	6.146% (1st)	5.928% (1st)
10	August 16, 2026	7.252% (1st)	7.277% (1st)
11	August 22, 2026	5.541% (1st)	5.436% (1st)
12	August 23, 2026	7.863% (1st)	7.884% (1st)
Average		5.664%	5.601%
In the table above, the blue numbers represent the lowest ratings and the red numbers represent the highest ratings.; This drama aired on a cable channel/pay TV which normally has a relatively smaller audience compared to free-to-air TV/public broadcasters (KBS, SBS, MBC, and EBS).
