= Park Eun-bin =

South Korean actress (born 1992)

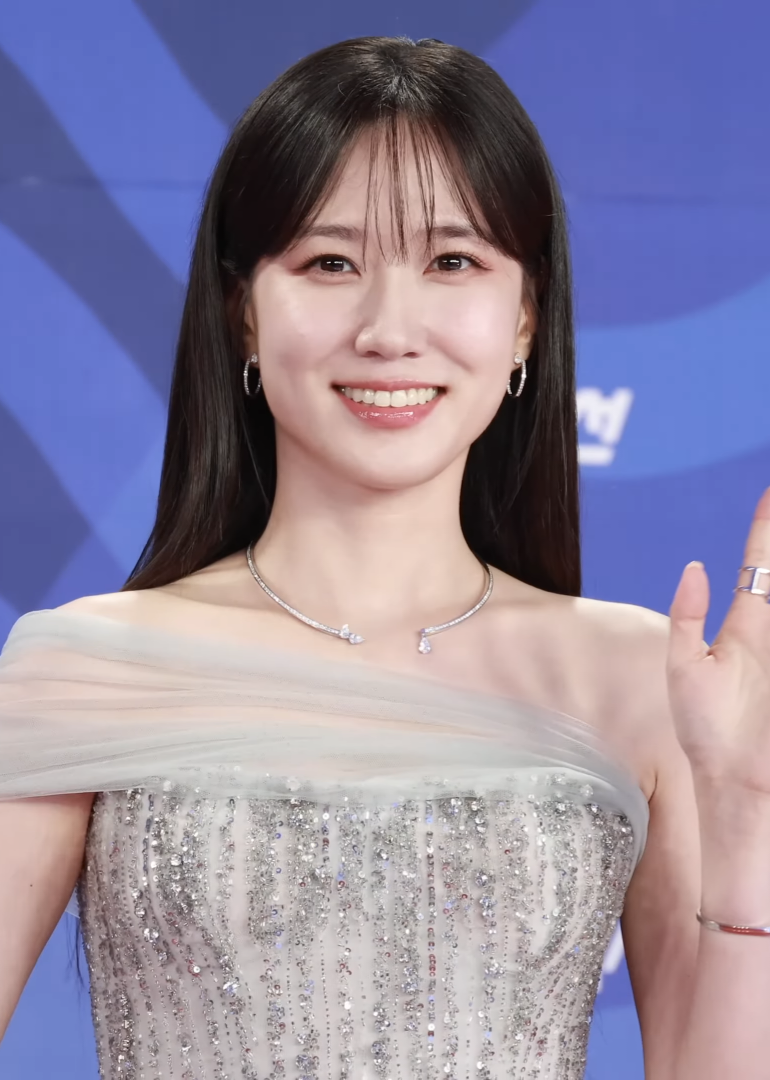
- Park in 2025
- Born: September 4, 1992 (age 34); Seoul, South Korea
- Education: Sogang University (Psychology)
- Occupation: Actress
- Years active: 1996–present
- Agent: Namoo Actors
- Awards: Full lists

Korean name
- Hangul: 박은빈
- RR: Bak Eunbin
- MR: Pak Ŭnbin
- Website: namooactors.com

Park Eun-bin (Korean: 박은빈; born September 4, 1992) is a South Korean actress. She began her career as a child model in 1996, and made her small screen debut as a child actress in White Nights 3.98 (1998). Park received international recognition for her performance as the title characters in The King's Affection (2021) and Extraordinary Attorney Woo (2022); for the latter, she won the Grand Prize at the 59th Baeksang Arts Awards. she subsequently starred in the musical dramedy Castaway Diva (2023), the psychological thriller Hyper Knife (2025), the superhero action comedy The Wonderfools and the horror romantic comedy Spooky in Love (both 2026).

Park was named Gallup Korea's Television Actor of the Year, Sisa Journal's Cultural Person of the Year, and Cultura's Drama Icon of 2022. She also made her first entry into Forbes Korea Power Celebrity in 2023, placing 11th.

== Career ==
=== 1996–2017: Debut as a child actress and transition to lead roles ===
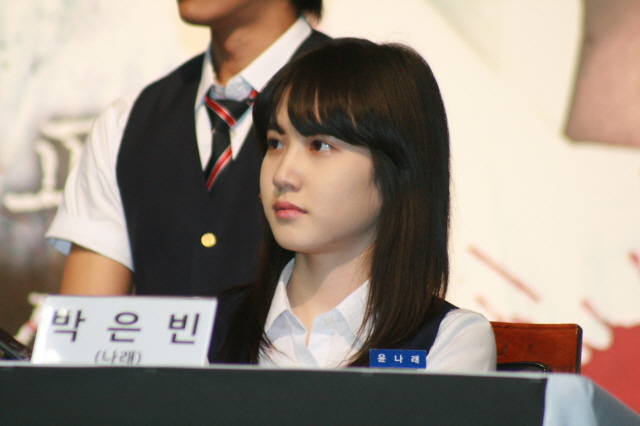
Park in June 2010

Park Eun-bin debuted as a child model in 1996, and since starting acting at the age of five, has starred in numerous television series, playing the younger version of various characters. She received the Best Young Actress award in 2009 for her role in the drama The Iron Empress.

She landed her first leading role in the time-traveling romance Operation Proposal (2012). Park continued playing supporting roles until she gained recognition for her role in the youth ensemble cast series about a group of young women in their early 20s, Hello, My Twenties! in 2016 and its sequel in 2017. She was cast in the legal drama Judge vs. Judge, followed by horror thriller The Ghost Detective in 2018.

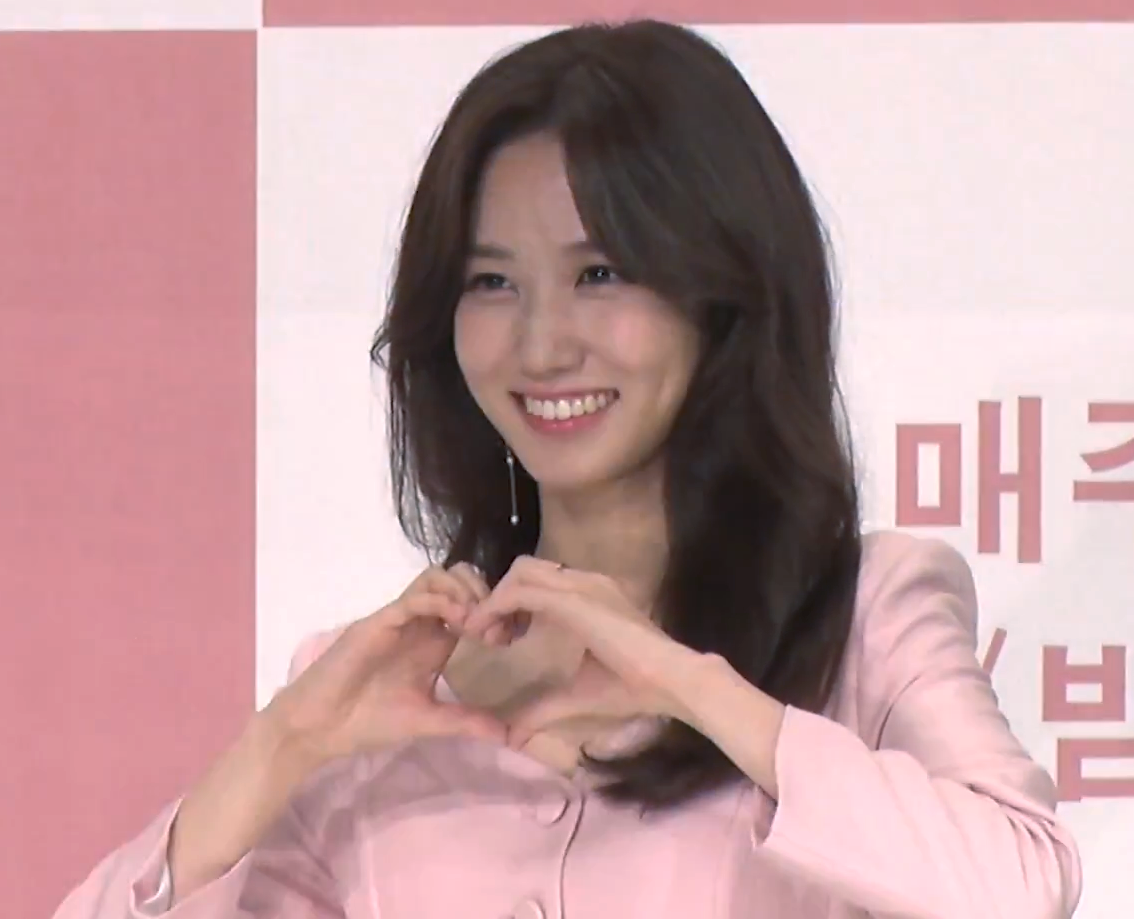
Park during The Ghost Detective press conference in August 2018

=== 2019–2021: Career rise and breakthrough ===
Park then starred in the hit sports drama Hot Stove League (2019–2020) alongside Namkoong Min, in which she played the operations manager of a floundering baseball team. The series, which premiered to a 3% viewership rating, went on to achieve a peak rating of 19.1% and won Best Drama at the 56th Baeksang Arts Awards.

Park was cast as an aspiring violinist in the musical romance drama Do You Like Brahms?. Despite having some experience playing the violin, Park spent three months practising the instrument to prepare for the role. Her performance garnered her the Top Excellence Actress Award at the 2020 SBS Drama Awards.

In 2021, Park played the role of Crown Prince Yi Hwi in the historical series The King's Affection. For her portrayal of the cross-dressing heroine, Park received the Top Excellence Actress Award at the 2021 KBS Drama Awards and a Best Actress nomination at the 58th Baeksang Arts Awards. Park also won the Best Actor Award at the 49th Korean Broadcasting Awards for her role. The drama was also awarded Best Telenovela at the 50th International Emmy Awards.

=== 2022–present: Winning grand prize, music releases and other projects ===
In 2022, Park starred in Park Hoon-jung's action-horror film The Witch: Part 2. The Other One, the sequel to the 2018 film The Witch: Part 1. The Subversion.

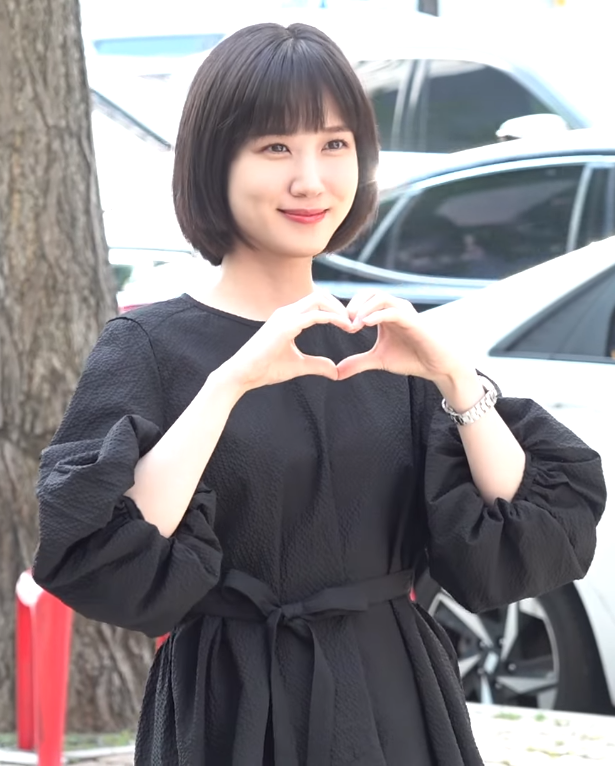
Park in July 2022

In the same year, she starred in Extraordinary Attorney Woo, playing the titular role of Woo Young-woo, a lawyer who is an autistic savant. It was later revealed that the production team waited over a year for Park to take part in the drama, after she reportedly declined the role because she "felt like the series wasn't something that [she] should approach lightly". Nonetheless, this performance earned her acclaim from both critics and audiences. The drama, which aired on the new channel ENA, started with an audience rating of 0.9% and finished with 17.5% in Korea. The drama was a global success, ranking in the top 10 most watched non-English TV series on Netflix for 21 weeks. Park's compelling performance earned her international recognition, winning the Best Actor Award at the Asia Contents Awards and the Rising Star Award for TV at the Critics' Choice Awards' Asian Pacific Cinema & Television division. At the 59th Baeksang Arts Awards, Park was awarded the Grand Prize in Television.

On January 4, 2024, Park released a digital single album Present ahead of her fan concert Eunbin Note: Diva, which would be held on January 6 and 7. On March 28, she released a new single "Kung Ddari Sha Bah Rah", which is a remake of music duo Clon's debut song. On September 8, Park released a digital single album To You, which was revealed during her second fan concert Eunbin Note: Bingo-on held on September 7. On November 1, she was cast in the Netflix superpower comedy series The Wonderfools alongside Cha Eun-woo.

In 2025, Park starred as Jeong Se-ok in the drama Hyper Knife, portraying a brilliant neurosurgeon who turns to illegal operations after losing her medical license. The series, directed by Kim Jung-hyun and written by Kim Sun-hee, explores her complex relationship with her former mentor, played by Sul Kyung-gu. On September 6, Park held her third fan concert Eunbin Note: Hyper Day, before releasing the digital single album Piece by Piece on the following day. On December 14, she released a special single "A Melody in Snow".

In 2026, Park has back to back drama releases. In May, Park starred in the Netflix superpower comedy series The Wonderfools. In July, Park starred in Spooky in Love, based on the 2011 film Spellbound, which tells the story of Cheon Yeo-ri, a chaebol heiress who can see ghosts and causes anyone she touches to see them as well. In commemoration of her 30th anniversary since debut, Park released a studio album Shooting My Love on September 4, ahead of her fourth fan concert Eunbin Note: Euniverse held on September 5.

== Filmography ==
Key
†	Denotes films that have not yet been released

=== Film ===
Year	Title	Role	Notes	Ref.
2000	A Girl's Prayer		Military film	
2002	Memories			
2002	The Romantic President			
2004	Has the Shower Ended?		Short film from 1.3.6	
2004	How to Keep My Love			
2010	Death Bell 2: Bloody Camp	Na-rae		
2013	Secretly, Greatly	Yoon Yoo-ran	Cameo	
2022	The Witch: Part 2. The Other One	Kyung-hee		
2023	Road to Boston	Ok-rim	Special appearance	

=== Television series ===
Year	Title	Role	Notes	Ref.
1998	White Nights 3.98	Choi So-young		
1999	MBC Best Theater – "Building a House on the Sand, Dried Pollack Head, Crocodile, and Old Love"			
1999	I Only Know Love	Jung-min		
2000	MBC Best Theater – "Song-yi's Play, Golden Glow"			
2000	The Thief's Daughter	Jung-nim		
2001	Empress Myeongseong	young Lady Min		
2001	The Merchant	Ippeuni		
2001	Guardian Angel	young Jung Da-so		
2001	Theatre of Our Stories "Yoo-na's Sketchbook Diary"			
2002	Me and My Transformed Dad	Kim Ma-ri		
2002	Kitchen Maid			
2002	My Love Patzzi	young Eun Hee-won		
2002	Hard Love	young Seo Kyung-joo		
2002	Glass Slippers	young Woo Seung-hee		
2003	Age of Warriors	Queen Sapyeong		
2003	Country Princess	young Kim Geum-hee		
2003	The King's Woman	Song-yi		
2003	Autumn Friend			
2004	Stained Glass	young Shin Ji-soo		
2005	Encounter	young Choi Eom-ji		
2005	Resurrection	young Seo Eun-ha		
2005	Hong Kong Express	Hwan-hee		
2005	Dreams of an Exciting New School Term	Mi-rae		
2006	Seoul 1945	Moon Suk-kyung		
2007	My Beloved Sister	Min Ji-na		
2007	Catching Up with Gangnam Moms	Lee Ji-yeon		
2007	The Legend	young Seo Kiha		
2007	Lobbyist	young Yoo Moon-young/Eva		
2009	Empress Cheonchu	young Hwangbo Seol		
2009	Queen Seondeok	Princess Boryang		
2011	Dream High	16-year-old Go Hye-sung	Cameo (episode 16)	
2011	Gyebaek	young Eun-ko		
2012	Operation Proposal	Ham Yi-seul		
2013	Hur Jun, The Original Story	Lee Da-hee		
2014	Secret Door	Lady Hyegyŏng		
2016	Entertainer	Soo-hyun	Cameo (episode 18)	
2016–2017	Hello, My Twenties!	Song Ji-won	Season 1–2	
2016–2017	Father, I'll Take Care of You	Oh Dong-hee		
2017–2018	Judge vs. Judge	Lee Jung-joo		
2018	The Ghost Detective	Jung Yeo-wool		
2019–2020	Hot Stove League	Lee Se-young		
2020	Do You Like Brahms?	Chae Song-ah		
2021	The King's Affection	Yi Hwi / Dam-i / Yeonseon		
2022	Extraordinary Attorney Woo	Woo Young-woo		
2023	Castaway Diva	Seo Mok-ha		
2025	Hyper Knife	Jeong Se-ok		
2026	The Wonderfools	Eun Chae-ni		
2026	Spooky in Love	Cheon Yeo-ri		

=== Web series ===
Year	Title	Role	Ref.
2016	Choco Bank	Ha Cho-co	

=== Television shows ===
Year	Title	Role	Ref.
2003	Open, Children's Song World	Host	
2009	Boys & Girls Music Countdown	Host	

=== Music video appearances ===
Year	Song title	Artist	Ref.
2001	"Doll"	Baby V.O.X.	
2001	"Angel's Prayer"	N.Gel	
2002	"Cold"	Lee Ki-chan	
2002	"Sad Day"	Jung Yoon-don	
2005	"Thank You for Loving Me"	S.Jin	
2007	"I Still Don't Know"	Yoon Gun	
2009	"Romantic Winter"	Kim Jin-pyo	
2010	"I'll Be There"	Taeyang	
2010	"Like a Star"	Taeyeon & The One	
2011	"Without You"	BoM	
2011	"You and Me, Heart Fluttering"	Acoustic Collabo	

=== Hosting ===
Year	Title	Notes	Ref.
2021	16th Seoul International Drama Awards	with Cha Eun-woo	
2023	28th Busan International Film Festival	Opening ceremony	

== Theatre ==
Year	Title	Role	Notes	Ref.
2009	A Long Time Ago, Whoa, Whoa...	Wife	Dongnang Repertory Company	

== Discography ==
=== Studio albums ===
List of studio albums, showing selected details, selected chart positions, and sales figures
Title	Details	Peak chart positions	Sales
Title	Details	KOR	Sales
Shooting My Love	Released: September 4, 2026; Label: MusicBuddy, Kakao; Formats: CD, digital download, streaming; Track listing: 1. "Dreams Come True"; 2. "Sunrise" (태양은 떠올라); 3. "Prism" (프리즘); 4. "Now"; 5. "Watercolor" (수채화); 6. "Paper Airplane" (종이비행기); 7. "If I Close My Eyes and Count Ten" (눈을 감고 열을 센다면); 8. "Do-re-mi-fa" (도레미파); 9. "It's Okay" (괜찮아); 10. "Into The Light"; 11. "A Melody in Snow" (눈의 멜로디); 12. "Someday" (Band version); 13. "Dreams Come True" (Inst.); 14. "Sunrise" (태양은 떠올라) (Inst.); 15. "Prism" (프리즘) (Inst.); 16. "Now" (Inst.); 17. "Watercolor" (수채화) (Inst.); 18. "Paper Airplane" (종이비행기) (Inst.); 19. "If I Close My Eyes and Count Ten" (눈을 감고 열을 센다면) (Inst.); 20. "Do-re-mi-fa" (도레미파) (Inst.); 21. "It's Okay" (괜찮아) (Inst.); 22. "Into The Light" (Inst.); 23. "A Melody in Snow" (눈의 멜로디) (Inst.); 24. "Someday" (Band version) (Inst.)	50	KOR: 2,212

=== Single albums ===
List of single albums, showing selected details, selected chart positions, and sales figures
Title	Details	Peak chart positions	Sales
Title	Details	KOR	Sales
Present	Released: January 4, 2024; Label: MusicBuddy, Kakao; Formats: CD, digital download, streaming; Track listing: 1. "Do-re-mi-fa" (도레미파); 2. "Into The Light"; 3. "Now"; 4. "Do-re-mi-fa" (도레미파) (Inst.); 5. "Into The Light" (Inst.); 6. "Now" (Inst.)	72	KOR: 2,500
To You	Released: September 8, 2024; Label: MusicBuddy, Kakao; Formats: CD, digital download, streaming; Track listing: 1. "Paper Airplane" (종이비행기); 2. "Watercolor" (수채화); 3. "Paper Airplane" (종이비행기) (Inst.); 4. "Watercolor" (수채화) (Inst.)	—	—N/a
Piece by Piece	Released: September 7, 2025; Label: MusicBuddy, Kakao; Formats: Digital download, streaming; Track listing: 1. "If I Close My Eyes and Count Ten" (눈을 감고 열을 센다면); 2. "It's Okay" (괜찮아); 3. "If I Close My Eyes and Count Ten" (눈을 감고 열을 센다면) (Inst.); 4. "It's Okay" (괜찮아) (Inst.)	—	—N/a
"—" denotes releases that did not chart or were not released in that region.

=== Singles ===
List of singles, showing year released, and name of the album
Title	Year	Album
"Do-re-mi-fa" (도레미파)	2024	Present
"Kung Ddari Sha Bah Rah" (꿍따리 샤바라)	2024	Non-album single
"Paper Airplane" (종이비행기)	2024	To You
"Watercolor" (수채화)	2024	To You
"If I Close My Eyes and Count Ten" (눈을 감고 열을 센다면)	2025	Piece by Piece
"It's Okay" (괜찮아)	2025	Piece by Piece
"A Melody in Snow" (눈의 멜로디)	2025	Shooting My Love
"Dreams Come True"	2026	Shooting My Love
"Sunrise" (태양은 떠올라)	2026	Shooting My Love
"Prism" (프리즘)	2026	Shooting My Love

=== Soundtrack appearances ===
List of soundtrack appearances, showing year released, selected chart positions, and name of the album
Title	Year	Peak chart positions	Album
Title	Year	KOR	Album
"A Little Love Story"	2012	—	Operation Proposal OST
"The Blue Night of Jeju Island"	2022	—	Extraordinary Attorney Woo OST
"Someday"	2023	108	Castaway Diva OST
"Night and Day" (그날 밤) (Acoustic Ver.)	2023	—	Castaway Diva OST
"Night and Day" (그날 밤) (Contest Ver.)	2023	—	Castaway Diva OST
"Mint"	2023	—	Castaway Diva OST
"Here I Am"	2023	—	Castaway Diva OST
"Open Your Eyes"	2023	—	Castaway Diva OST
"Until the End"	2023	—	Castaway Diva OST
"Dream Us" (Acoustic Ver.)	2023	—	Castaway Diva OST
"Dream Us" (Original Ver.)	2023	—	Castaway Diva OST
"Fly Away"	2023	—	Castaway Diva OST
"Someday, Someway"	2023	—	Castaway Diva OST
"—" denotes releases that did not chart or were not released in that region.
