= Bad Man (2015 film) =

- Directed by: Kim Harry
- Produced by: Kim Yeong-hwan
- Starring: Park Byung-eun
- Distributed by: Yejilim Entertainment, Mirovision Inc.
- Release date: 16 July 2015
- Running time: 91 minutes
- Country: South Korea
- Language: Korean

Bad Man (Korean: 악인은 살아 있다; RR: Agineun sara itda) is a 2015 South Korean film directed by Kim Harry and starring Park Byung-eun. The film is Kim's third feature-length project.

Park plays the part of an ordinary man who resorts to villainous deeds after his wife's death. The actor caught the attention of director Kim Harry with his previous performance in the 2014 film Monster.

== Plot ==
While the news media is covering a corruption and embezzlement scandal involving the president of Hanseung Venture Capital, Baek Dong-il (Kim Hong-pa), high-ranking employee Na Yoo-mi (Han Soo-yeon) is found dead at the bottom of a cliff. Her massive injuries are attributed to a fall. Because no evidence of foul play can be found, the death is passed off by police as an accident or suicide. Her husband, Han Byung-do (Park Byung-eun), convinced that her death is related to the scandal, becomes determined to punish Baek. The film follows Han's progression from an ordinary person to a cunning and hate-filled man out for vengeance.

Meanwhile, Baek Dong-il is preparing a smuggling operation with the help of Song Chan-hyuk (Kim Pub-Lae). Detective Kim Joo-won (Park Ji-hwan) doggedly investigates the corruption case and eventually discovers both the smuggling plans and Han Byung-do's plan for revenge. The men eventually come to a head, leading to an unexpected revelation.

== Cast ==
- Park Byung-eun as Han Byung-do
- Kim Hong-pa as Baek Dong-il
- Han Soo-yeon as Na Yoo-mi
- Shin Rin-ah as Han Yeon-woo
- Park Ji-hwan as Detective Kim Joo-won
- Son Sung-chan as Executive Director Lee

== Release and reception ==
Critics generally praised the film's performances and had mixed reactions to the story line. The film performed poorly at the Korean box office, selling only 1,821 tickets during its theatrical run.
