= Hwang In-ho =

South Korean film director and screenwriter

- Born: South Korea
- Occupations: Film director, screenwriter
- Years active: 2004–present

Korean name
- Hangul: 황인호
- RR: Hwang Inho
- MR: Hwang Inho

Hwang In-ho is a South Korean film director and screenwriter. He wrote and directed the horror-romantic comedy Spellbound (2011) and the crime thriller Monster (2014).

== Career ==
=== As screenwriter ===
Hwang In-ho first wrote the screenplay of Sisily 2km (also known as To Catch a Virgin Ghost), a 2004 film that combined horror and black comedy elements in a story about gangsters (played by Im Chang-jung and Kwon Oh-joong) who steal a diamond and escape to a small town. His next screenplay, Love Phobia (titled "Lizard" in Korean) was a 2006 melodrama that starred Cho Seung-woo and Kang Hye-jung as a couple who meet each other only thrice in the 20 years spanning their childhood to adulthood. His third screenplay, Two Faces of My Girlfriend (2007) was a romantic comedy about a 30-year-old male virgin and loser who falls for a woman with DID (played by Bong Tae-gyu and Jung Ryeo-won). Hwang also served as script editor on high school comedy The Legend of Seven Cutter (also known as Escaping from Charisma, 2006) starring Yoon Eun-hye, and the World War II blockbuster My Way (2011) starring Jang Dong-gun.

=== Spellbound ===
In 2011, Hwang made his feature directorial debut with Spellbound (titled "Chilling Romance" in Korean), about a stage magician (Lee Min-ki) who meets an introverted woman (Son Ye-jin) who is constantly haunted by ghosts. Like Sisily 2km, Hwang again flouted genre conventions by combining romantic comedy with horror. He said he had felt uncomfortable within the limitations of Korean commercial cinema, and wanted his "story to flow free of genre restrictions," adding, "Why do you have to respect every genre rule? My story still makes sense anyway, with or without them. [...] I just added a ghost to a simple love story, which resulted in a romance with a totally different texture than other romance films." Spellbound became a hit with more than 3 million admissions, making it the 7th top-grossing Korean film of 2011 and one of the most commercially successful Korean rom-coms in recent years.

=== Monster ===
For his sophomore directorial effort, Hwang reunited with actor Lee Min-ki on Monster (2014), this time opposite Kim Go-eun. Kim played a developmentally disabled woman who wreaks revenge on the serial killer (Lee) who murdered her beloved younger sister. Hwang experimented further with his filmmaking by pushing genres to the extremes, combining thriller, comedy and fantasy. But he primarily presented the film as "a character drama," saying he made "an effort to express the emotions, alienation and loneliness the main characters were experiencing. It was their emotions rather than the situations I wanted to explore. [...] What counts for me are characters. What interests me is the fresh tone created by a new type of character when he or she is introduced to a different cinematic world." Critical and audience response were mostly negative, criticizing the unsuccessful genre mashup and a perceived misogyny beneath the film's ostensible message of female empowerment.

== Filmography ==
- Decibel (2022) - director, screenplay
- Monster (2014) - director, screenplay
- My Way (2011) - script editor
- Spellbound (2011) - director, screenplay
- Two Faces of My Girlfriend (2007) - screenplay
- Love Phobia (2006) - screenplay, script editor
- The Legend of Seven Cutter (2006) - script editor
- To Catch a Virgin Ghost (2004) - screenplay
