= Love Phobia =

- Theatrical poster
- Hangul: 도마뱀
- RR: Domabaem
- MR: Tomabaem
- Directed by: Kang Ji-eun
- Written by: Hwang In-ho
- Produced by: Jung Seung-hye
- Starring: Kang Hye-jung; Cho Seung-woo
- Cinematography: Kim Yong-heung
- Edited by: Ko Im-pyo
- Music by: Park Ki-heon
- Distributed by: Cinema Service
- Release date: April 27, 2006 (South Korea)
- Running time: 117 minutes
- Country: South Korea
- Language: Korean
- Budget: US$3 million
- Box office: US$2.2 million

Love Phobia (Korean: 도마뱀; RR: Domabaem; lit. 'Lizard') is a 2006 South Korean romance drama film directed by Kang Ji-eun and starring Kang Hye-jung and Cho Seung-woo.

== Plot ==
One sunny day, a young boy named Jo-kang meets a curious young girl dressed in a bright yellow raincoat. She tells everyone in school that she is an alien and whomever she touches will be harmed. Everyone in that school becomes afraid of her, except Jo-kang. Jo-kang befriends the girl, Ari, and falls instantly in love with her. The quirky Ari loves telling Jo-kang stories, and he believes everything she says and is willing to do anything for her. After he and Ari huddle together beneath her yellow raincoat one rainy day, Jo-kang becomes sick with measles. Soon afterwards, she disappears.

Ten years later, Ari contacts Jo-kang, now in high school, and asks to meet again. Although they have not seen each other in a decade, they have a wonderful time together, and their love begins anew. Ari tells him that she lives at a temple on a mountain that's actually a volcano, and that hot springs surround it. Jo-kang believes her when she tells him that her English got better after she was given lessons by an English ghost who visits her when she's naked. She also tells him that she plans to marry a banker so that she'll be able to rob his bank and leave the planet. Jo-kang travels all night to bring Ari her favorite dish from his home, presenting it to her as a surprise the next morning. She kisses him and Jo-kang catches the flu. Then Ari disappears once more, leaving Jo-kang devastated.

Jo-kang becomes an adult, and one day Ari appears again in front of him and tells him to come with her. At first he ties her leg to a chair with shoelaces so she can't get away. Later that evening at his home, Ari explains to Jo-kang's father, a sushi chef, that people from NASA kidnapped her since the magnetic force in her body attracts the UFOs. Jo-kang makes plans for the next day, but Ari tells him that she is leaving for the States. Upon leaving, Ari reminds Jo-kang not to cross the line she drew on the ground, something she constantly told him in their childhood.

One of Jo-kang's friends gets into an accident and when Jo-kang visits his friend at the hospital, he sees Ari there as a patient. Filled with pain and confusion, Jo-kang visits Ari's uncle, a monk, and pours gasoline on himself, threatening to set himself on fire unless he learns the truth. He discovers that Ari is suffering from HIV/AIDS that was accidentally transmitted to her at a hospital where she was taken after an accident that caused the death of her father.

Jo-kang goes to an exhibit where Ari's photographs are displayed, and afterwards he piggybacks her to a grassy lawn where she explains that crop circles are signs left by a UFO. Later that night, Ari falls sick and is admitted back to the hospital. Jo-kang stands outside the hospital, getting wet in the rain. But when Ari's uncle tells him to come inside, Jo-kang replies that he's obeying Ari's instruction not to cross her line on the ground.

Jo draws designs on the grassy lawn, and takes Ari there against doctor's orders, telling her to fulfill her destiny to leave the planet. Ari passes the last moments of her life telling Jo-kang that she loves and pities him for believing everything she said. Jo-kang then sees a flying saucer appear in the night sky, signifying Ari's death.

In the final scene, Jo-kang goes on with his life, narrating in voice-over that the scent of love that Ari left still lingers. He prefers to believe that she's living on another planet, waiting for the day that they will meet each other again.

== Cast ==
- Kang Hye-jung as Ari
- Cho Seung-woo as Cha Jo-kang
- Byun Joo-yeon as young Ari
- Park Gun-woo as young Jo-kang
- Jung Jin-young as Dr. Chu
- Jung Sung-hwa as Joon-chul
- Kang Shin-il as Jo-kang's father, a sushi chef
- Lee Jae-yong as Ari's uncle, a monk
- Park Shin-hye as Byeon-ja
- Woo Hyun as taxi driver
- Lee Hyung-chul as Dr. Kang
- Nam Jeong-hee as grandmother
- Ko Tae-ho as class president
- Kang Yi-seok as child cancer patient
- Jo Hyun-chul as Sang-hyuk
- Park Kyung-ok as shaman
- Baek So-mi as Ji-yeon
- Song Young-kyu as Young-ho
- Jin Kyung as female teacher
- Im Ji-min as girl at bank

== Reception ==
Cho Seung-woo and Kang Hye-jung were a real-life couple when Love Phobia was filmed and released, but despite their combined star power, the movie did not become a commercial success at the box office, receiving a total of 397,913 admissions. The Korea Times review praised Jo and Kang's acting, but called the film "a standard melodrama."
