= Decibel (film) =

2022 South Korean film

- Theatrical release poster
- Hangul: 데시벨
- RR: Desibel
- MR: Tesibel
- Directed by: Hwang In-ho
- Written by: Hwang In-ho; Lee Jin-hoon
- Starring: Kim Rae-won; Lee Jong-suk; Jung Sang-hoon; Park Byung-eun; Lee Sang-hee; Jo Dal-Hwan; Cha Eun-woo; Lee Min-ki
- Cinematography: Park Jong-cheol; Eom Si-u
- Edited by: Kim Chang-ju
- Music by: Mok Yeong-jin
- Production company: East Dream Synopex
- Distributed by: Mindmark; Wide Lens Pictures
- Release date: November 16, 2022 (South Korea)
- Running time: 110 minutes
- Country: South Korea
- Language: Korean
- Box office: US$7.2 million

Decibel (Korean: 데시벨) is a 2022 South Korean action thriller film co-written and directed by Hwang In-ho, starring Kim Rae-won, Lee Jong-suk, Jung Sang-hoon, Park Byung-eun and Cha Eun-woo. It was released theatrically on November 16, 2022.

== Premise ==
Decibel is a sound terror action film revolving around a bomb designer who wants to occupy the city center with a special bomb that explodes when the noise increases and a former naval commander who becomes his target.

== Cast ==
- Kim Rae-won as Kang Do-young, ex-Navy Submarine Commander who became the target of terrorism
- Lee Jong-suk as Jeon Tae-seong, bomb designer and Navy Lieutenant from Mensa
- Jung Sang-hoon as Oh Dae-oh, special reporter who came to accompany a terrorist incident
- Park Byung-eun as Cha Young-han, Defense Counterintelligence Command agent
- Lee Sang-hee as Jang Yoo-jung, Navy EOD Petty Officer
- Jo Dal-hwan as Noh Jung-seop, Navy submarine sound detective
- Lee Min-ki as Lieutenant Hwang Yong-woo, Navy Submarine Lieutenant
- Cha Eun-woo as Jeon Tae-ryong, Navy Submarine Sound Detection Officer
- Kang Kyung-hun as Superintendent
- Woo Ji-hyun as Kim Yoo-taek
- Jo In-woo as Lee Dae-woo, who is a member of the military security support unit.

== Production ==
Principal photography began on April 20, 2021.

On November 14, 2022, the film was invited to screen at the Asian World Film Festival, which premiered on November 12.
