= A Million =

2009 film directed by Jo Min-ho

- Film poster
- Hangul: 10억
- Hanja: 10億
- RR: 10eok
- MR: 10ŏk
- Directed by: Jo Min-ho
- Written by: Jo Min-ho
- Produced by: Kim Ji-yeon; Lee Nam-seok; David Cho
- Starring: Park Hae-il; Park Hee-soon; Shin Min-a; Lee Min-ki; Jung Yu-mi; Lee Chun-hee; Go Eun-ah
- Cinematography: Ryu Jae-hoon
- Edited by: Kim Hyeong-ju
- Music by: Jang Young-gyu; Dalpalan
- Production company: Iden Pictures
- Distributed by: Sidus FNH
- Release date: August 6, 2009
- Running time: 114 minutes
- Country: South Korea
- Language: Korean
- Box office: US$2.5 million

A Million (Korean: 10억; RR: 10eok) is a 2009 South Korean thriller film written and directed by Jo Min-ho. It stars Park Hae-il, Park Hee-soon, Shin Min-a, Lee Min-ki, Jung Yu-mi, Lee Chun-hee, and Go Eun-ah. Distributed by Sidus FNH, the film was released in South Korea on August 6, 2009.

== Plot ==
Eight contestants travel to the Perth to participate in an internet survival game show offering a prize of ₩1 billion (approximately US$1 million) to the final survivor. The program is hosted by producer Jang Min-cheol, who introduces the rules before beginning the first challenge, a team raft competition. Following a vote among the contestants, Choi Wook-hwan is eliminated and disappears, leaving behind his belongings and passport.

The following day, the remaining contestants are tasked with finding six arrows hidden throughout the forest. During the challenge, they discover that one of the arrows has been lodged in Choi Wook-hwan’s corpse, revealing that he was secretly murdered by Jang PD after his elimination. When Lee Bo-young confronts Jang PD after realizing the game has become a real-life killing spree, he kills her as well. The remaining contestants attempt to escape, but Jang PD uses surveillance cameras placed throughout the area to monitor their movements. After becoming stranded in the desert, the contestants are forced to participate in another challenge to reach an oasis, resulting in further deaths and leaving only five survivors.

As the contestants struggle to survive in the harsh Australian wilderness, more participants are killed. Ha Seung-ho dies while attempting to cross the desert, and Hong Soo-yeon is killed after attempting to cross a river alone. Cameraman Seo, who had continued filming under Jang PD's orders, eventually tries to attack him but is killed instead. Meanwhile, Kim Ji-eun, who had grown close to Park Chul-hee, is murdered by him when he decides to eliminate her to secure the prize money. Only Jo Yu-jin survives and returns to South Korea.

After the footage of the events is discovered online, Jo Yu-jin is taken to a hospital and questioned by police. Since the broadcast stopped after the confrontation between Han Ki-tae and Park Cheol-hee, authorities rely on Jo's account of the final events. According to her statement, Jang PD forced the final two survivors, Jo and Han, to participate in a Russian roulette game. Han repeatedly pulled the trigger before attempting to shoot Jang PD, but the gun failed to fire, allowing Jang PD to shoot him. Jo then used the same gun to shoot Jang PD, causing him to fall from a cliff. She escaped while carrying the injured Han, but he later died before she was rescued by Australian police.

Although Jo's account suggests that she killed Jang PD, a doctor argues that her actions were committed in self-defense and advises her to recover at home. On her way back, she receives a phone hidden inside a medicine bag and discovers that the caller is Jang PD, who is still alive. He reveals that the gun used during the final game contained no bullets and that he had staged his death. He explains that his goal was not simply to reward the winner but to fulfill his promise of giving the final survivor the ₩1 billion prize. He then directs Jo to the location of the money.

Jo travels to the building where she once worked at a convenience store and finds the cash. There, she remembers the incident that motivated Jang PD's actions. Two years earlier, his wife was assaulted and murdered outside the building after several people, including the eight contestants, witnessed the attack but failed to intervene. Han Ki-tae recorded the incident instead of helping, while the others ignored her pleas. After capturing and killing his wife's murderer, Jang PD sought revenge on the witnesses by creating the survival game and forcing them to experience the fear and helplessness his wife endured.

After learning the truth, Jo asks Jang PD whether his revenge has satisfied him. While speaking with her from a rooftop, Jang PD commits suicide by jumping to his death. Jo leaves the scene carrying the prize money.

== Cast ==
- Park Hae-il as Han Ki-tae
- Park Hee-soon as Jang Min-cheol PD
- Shin Min-a as Jo Yu-jin
- Lee Min-ki as Park Cheol-hee
- Jung Yu-mi as Kim Ji-eun
- Lee Chun-hee as Choi Wook-hwan
- Go Eun-ah as Lee Bo-young
- Kim Hak-sun as Ha Seung-ho
- Jung Suk-yong as Cameraman Seo
- Shin Dong-mi as Doctor An
- Choi Moo-sung as Detective Kim

== Production ==
The film was filmed primarily in Australia, with a production budget of less than ₩2 billion (South Korean won). To meet budget restrictions, the cast agreed to reduce their salaries for the film. Principal photography began in mid-February 2009.
