= Park Byung-eun =

South Korean actor (1977)

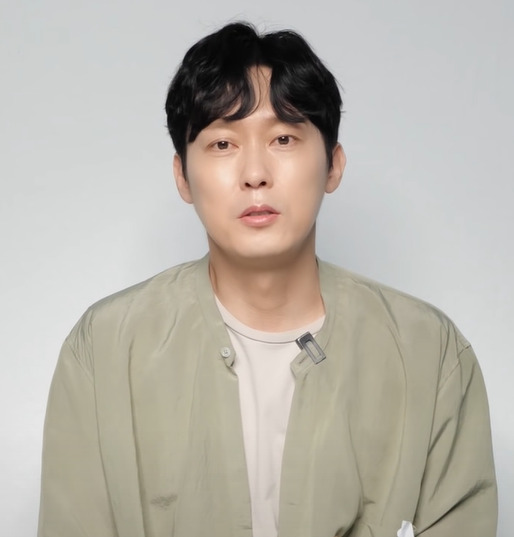
- Park in June 2021
- Born: July 14, 1977 (age 49); Seoul, South Korea
- Education: Chung-Ang University
- Occupation: Actor
- Years active: 2000–present
- Agent: C-JeS Studios

Korean name
- Hangul: 박병은
- RR: Bak Byeongeun
- MR: Pak Pyŏngŭn
- Website: c-jes.com

Park Byung-eun (Korean: 박병은; born July 14, 1977) is a South Korean actor.

== Early life and education ==
Park majored in drama at Chung-Ang University.

Park was set to debut with 90s South Korean boy group Taesaja in 1997, but gave up due to him feeling that he cannot sing well.

== Career ==
Park made his debut in 2000 with a minor role in the TV series Mr. Duke. He had bit roles in Sex Is Zero (2002), Princess Aurora (2005), and I'm a Cyborg, But That's OK (2005).

In 2008, he had his first major role in the drama film The Pit and the Pendulum Pit (2008). In 2015, he played a Japanese lieutenant in Assassination and was signed to a management company after his performance. In 2016, he notably landed his first leading role in the film One Line (2016). He also diversified his roles recently by starring in the rom-com TV series Because This Is My First Life (2017) and in the historical war epic The Great Battle (2018), Kingdom (2020) and Kingdom: Ashin of the North (2021).

In 2022, Park starred in the revenge drama Eve. It was a breakthrough role for him portraying the male lead opposite Seo Yea-ji. In 2025, Park starred in Netflix's mystery historical television series Dear Hongrang alongside Jo Bo-ah and Lee Jae-wook. It is based on Tangeum: Swallowing Gold by Jang Da-hye and was produced by Studio Dragon.

== Filmography ==
=== Film ===
Year	Title	Role	Ref.
2004	Spin Kick		
2007	Beautiful Sunday	Detective Min	
2009	Marine Boy	Ji-ho	
2009	The Pit and the Pendulum Pit	Byeong-tae	
2009	How to Live on Earth	Yeon-woo	
2010	Parallel Life	Seo Jeong-woon	
2010	The Influence	Odd-eye	
2010	The Yellow Sea	Bank employee	
2011	Children	Kim Joo-hwan	
2012	Nameless Gangster: Rules of the Time	Choi Joo-han (adult)	
2013	An Ethics Lesson	Lee Ji-hoon	
2013	Very Ordinary Couple	Mr. Min	
2013	Red Family	Chang-soo's father	
2014	Monster	Kwang-soo	
2014	No Tears for the Dead	Ha Yoon-gook	
2014	The Royal Tailor	The late King	
2015	Bad Man/The Wicked Are Alive	Han Byeong-do	
2015	Assassination	Kawaguchi Shunsuke	
2016	A Man and a Woman	Ahn Jae-suk	
2016	The Hunt	Kwak Jong-pi	
2017	One Line	Ji-won	
2017	The Mayor	Byeon Jong-gu's staff	
2017	The Return	Jeong-hwan	
2018	The Great Battle	Poong	
2019	Jo Pil-ho: The Dawning Rage	Nam Sung-sik	
2021	Seo Bok		
2022	In Our Prime	Geun-ho	
2022	Decibel	Cha Young-han	
2023	The Moon	Jeong Min-gyu	
2024	Citizen of a Kind	Detective Park	
2025	Lobby	Son Kwang-woo	

=== Television series ===
Year	Title	Role	Ref.
2017	Because This Is My First Life	Ma Song-goo	
2017	Queen of Mystery	Inspector Woo Seung-Ha	
2018	Your Honor	Sang Chul	
2018	What's Wrong with Secretary Kim	Park Byung-eun (cameo)	
2018	Queen of Mystery 2	Inspector Woo Seung-Ha	
2019	Voice	Kaneki Masayuki / Woo Jong-woo	
2019	Arthdal Chronicles	Dan byeok	
2020	Kingdom	Min Chi-rok	
2020	Oh My Baby	Yoon Jae-young	
2021	Kingdom: Ashin of the North	Min Chi-rok	
2021	Lost	Jung-soo	
2022	Kiss Sixth Sense	Fishing couple husband (Cameo)	
2022	Eve	Kang Yun-gyeom	
2022	Alchemy of Souls	Go-seong (Cameo)	
2023	Moving	Ma Sang-gu	
2024	The Bequeathed	Park Sang-min	
2025	Hyper Knife	Han Hyun-ho	
2025	Dear Hongrang	Sim Yeol-guk	

=== Hosting ===
Year	Title	Notes	Ref.
2022	Opening ceremony of 26th Bucheon International Fantastic Film Festival	With Han Sun-hwa	

== Accolades ==
=== Awards and nominations ===
Name of the award ceremony, year presented, category, nominee of the award, and the result of the nomination
Award ceremony	Year	Category	Nominee / Work	Result	Ref.
Blue Dragon Series Awards	2025	Best Supporting Actor	Hyper Knife	Nominated	

=== Listicles ===
Name of publisher, year listed, name of listicle, and placement
Publisher	Year	Listicle	Placement	Ref.
Korean Film Council	2021	Korean Actors 200 (Note: Introduces 200 actors that best represent the present and future of Korean cinema to the people in the film industry all over the world.)	Included	
