= Because This Is My First Life =

South Korean TV series

- Promotional poster
- Hangul: 이번 생은 처음이라
- Lit.: This Life Is Our First
- RR: Ibeon saengeun cheoeumira
- MR: Ibŏn saengŭn ch'ŏŭmira
- Genre: Romantic comedy
- Written by: Yoon Nan-joong
- Directed by: Park Joon-hwa
- Starring: Lee Min-ki; Jung So-min
- Country of origin: South Korea
- Original language: Korean
- No. of episodes: 16

Production
- Executive producer: Lee Jung-hee
- Running time: 60 minutes
- Production companies: Studio Dragon; MI

Original release
- Network: tvN
- Release: October 9 – November 28, 2017

Because This Is My First Life (Korean: 이번 생은 처음이라) is a 2017 South Korean television series starring Lee Min-ki and Jung So-min that explores different points of view on careers, relationships, marriage, and love. The series marks Lee Min-ki's first small-screen lead role since 2007. It aired on tvN from October 9 to November 28, 2017, every Monday and Tuesday at 21:30 (KST).

== Synopsis ==
Socially awkward IT employee Nam Se-hee (Lee Min-ki) and broke homeless writer Yoon Ji-ho (Jung So-min) agree to a marriage of convenience by signing a contract of two years, wherein they agree to the terms and conditions of only being landlord and tenant, sharing their home based on common goals and values. Things do not go as planned when the housemates' pact of platonic cohabitation is interfered with by their trauma, social expectations, and familial interventions.

== Cast ==
=== Main ===
- Lee Min-ki as Nam Se-hee, a quirky and apathetic computer designer who has bought an expensive townhouse and rents out his extra room to help with the mortgage. He spends his days at work or home with his cat and has no plans to date or marry. After a series of bad tenants, he rates Ji-ho very highly and, believing she is a male, he offers her the room.
- Jung So-min as Yoon Ji-ho, an assistant screenwriter who moves out of the home she shares with her brother when he marries his pregnant girlfriend. Currently between projects, she rents the room from Se-hee (who Ji-ho thinks is female) because the rent is affordable and no deposit is required. After working hard at her career throughout her twenties, at age 30 she has never dated and has a career crisis that causes her to rethink her goals.

=== Supporting ===
- Esom as Woo Su-ji, a school friend of Ji-ho who works in a corporate office. Her dream was to be the CEO of her own business but she is trapped in a well-paying position where she must bear with frequent sexual harassment from her male colleagues.
- Park Byung-eun as Ma Sang-goo, Se-hee's friend since college and CEO of the company where Se-hee works.
- Kim Ga-eun as Yang Ho-rang, a school friend of Ji-ho who is a hostess at a restaurant/bar and dreams of becoming a wife and mother.
- Kim Min-seok as Sim Won-seok, Ho-rang's long-time boyfriend who is the CEO of a startup company which is having problems getting an investor.

==== People around Nam Se-hee ====
- Kim Eung-soo as Nam Hee-bong, Se-hee's father who is a former high school principal.
- Moon Hee-kyung as Jo Myung-ji, Se-hee's mother who is a full-time housewife.

==== People around Yoon Ji-ho ====
- Kim Byeong-ok as Yoon Jong-soo, Ji-ho's father who is a car center operator.
- Kim Sun-young as Kim Hyun-ja, Ji-ho's mother who is a full-time housewife.
- Noh Jong-hyun as Yoon Ji-suk, Ji-ho's younger brother.
- Jeon Hye-won as Lee Eun-sol, Ji-suk's pregnant wife.

=== Extended ===
- Kim Min-kyu as Yeon Bok-nam, a colleague of Ji-ho's.
- Lee Chung-ah as Go Jung-min, Se-hee's ex-girlfriend, a successful businesswoman.
- Yoon Bo-mi as Yoon Bo-mi, a data analyst who works with Se-hee.
- Hwang Seok-jeong as Writer Hwang.

=== Special appearances ===
- Yoon Doo-joon (Episode 1)
- Yoon So-hee (Episode 1)
- Kim Wook as a director

== Production ==
The series is directed by Park Joon-hwa, and written by Yoon Nan-joong. The first script reading session of the cast took place on August 25, 2017 at Studio Dragon in Sangam-dong.

== Original soundtrack ==
Because This Is My First Life Original soundtrack

Soundtrack album by Various Artists
- Recorded: 2017
- Genre: Soundtrack
- Language: Korean
- Label: CJ E&M Music

=== Part 1 ===
No.	Title	Lyrics	Music	Artist	Length
1.	"Star Figure" (별 그림)	Moon Sung-nam	Moon Sung-nam	U-ji	3:05
2.	"Star Figure" (Inst.)		Moon Sung-nam		3:05
Total length:					6:10

=== Part 2 ===
No.	Title	Lyrics	Music	Artist	Length
1.	"Everyday"	32nd December	Taebongie, Lee Sang-wook	Haebin (Gugudan)	3:48
2.	"Everyday" (Inst.)		Taebongie, Lee Sang-wook		3:48
Total length:					7:36

=== Part 3 ===
No.	Title	Lyrics	Music	Artist	Length
1.	"I Want to Love" (사랑하고 싶게 돼)	Kim Min-seok	MeloMance	MeloMance	3:15
2.	"I Want to Love" (Inst.)		MeloMance		3:15
Total length:					6:30

=== Part 4 ===
No.	Title	Lyrics	Music	Artist	Length
1.	"Marriage" (결혼)	MoonMoon	MoonMoon	MoonMoon	3:24
2.	"Marriage" (Inst.)		MoonMoon		3:24
Total length:					6:48

=== Part 5 ===
No.	Title	Lyrics	Music	Artist	Length
1.	"This Life"	Moon Sung-nam	Moon Sung-nam	Moon Sung-nam	3:42
2.	"This Life" (Inst.)		Moon Sung-nam		3:42
Total length:					7:24

=== Part 6 ===
No.	Title	Lyrics	Music	Artist	Length
1.	"Shelter (ft. Lee Yo-han)"	Moon Sung-nam	Moon Sung-nam	Heejin (Good Day)	3:47
2.	"Shelter" (Inst.)		Moon Sung-nam		3:47
Total length:					7:34

=== Part 7 ===
No.	Title	Lyrics	Music	Artist	Length
1.	"Tomorrow"	Moon Sung-nam	Moon Sung-nam	Ryu Ji-hyun	3:55
2.	"Tomorrow" (Inst.)		Moon Sung-nam		3:55
Total length:					7:50

=== Part 8 ===
No.	Title	Lyrics	Music	Artist	Length
1.	"Can't Go" (갈 수가 없어)	Mackelli, MYJ	Mackelli	Ben	3:32
2.	"Can't Go" (Inst.)		Mackelli		3:32
Total length:					7:04

=== Commercial performance ===
Title	Year	Peak	Sales	Remarks
Title	Year	Gaon	Sales	Remarks
"I Want to Love" (사랑하고 싶게 돼)	2017	—	KOR: 18,273+	Part 3
"Marriage" (결혼)	2017	51	—	Part 4
"Can't Go" (갈 수가 없어)	2017	23	KOR: 148,493+	Part 8
"—" denotes releases that did not chart or were not released in that region.

== Ratings ==
Ep.	Original broadcast date	Title	Average audience share		
Ep.	Original broadcast date	Title	Nielsen Korea		TNmS
Ep.	Original broadcast date	Title	Nationwide	Seoul	Nationwide
1	October 9, 2017	Because This Is My First Time Being Thirty (서른은 처음이라)	2.023%	2.491%	2.3%
2	October 10, 2017	Because This Is My First Kiss (키스는 제가 처음이라)	2.647%	3.738%	2.5%
3	October 16, 2017	Because This Is My First Proposal (프로포즈는 제가 처음이라)	2.292%	2.825%	3.0%
4	October 17, 2017	Because This Is My First Marriage (결혼은 제가 처음이라)	3.841%	4.702%	3.6%
5	October 23, 2017	Because This Is My First Promise (약속은 처음이라)	2.725%	3.263%	2.9%
6	October 24, 2017	Because This Is "Our" First Time ('우리'는 처음이라)	3.636%	3.889%	4.5%
7	October 30, 2017	Because This Is My First YOLO (욜로는 처음이라)	3.266%	4.179%	3.2%
8	October 31, 2017	Because This Is My First Husband (남편은 처음이라)	3.779%	4.242%	4.0%
9	November 6, 2017	Because This Is the First Time I Belong Somewhere (소속감은 처음이라)	3.652%	5.030%	3.3%
10	November 7, 2017	Because This Is My First Time Having In-laws (시월드는 처음이라)	4.197%	5.177%	5.0%
11	November 13, 2017	Because This Is My First Beach (오늘의 바다는 처음이라)	3.528%	4.082%	3.8%
12	November 14, 2017	Because This Is My First Desire (욕망은 처음이라)	3.940%	4.814%	5.0%
13	November 20, 2017	Because This Is My First Time Visiting Your Room (당신의 방은 처음이라)	3.545%	4.411%	4.1%
14	November 21, 2017	Because This Is My First Confession (고백은 처음이라)	4.236%	5.273%	4.7%
15	November 27, 2017	Because This Is My First Intermission (인터미션은 처음이라)	3.786%	4.982%	4.2%
16	November 28, 2017	Because This Is My First Life (이번 생은 처음이라)	4.931%	5.862%	5.0%
Average			3.463%	4.271%	3.8%
In the table above, the blue numbers represent the lowest ratings and the red numbers represent the highest ratings.; This series aired on a cable channel/pay TV which normally has a relatively smaller audience compared to free-to-air TV/public broadcasters (KBS, SBS, MBC, and EBS).

== Awards and nominations ==
Year	Award	Category	Recipient	Result	Ref.
2018	MBC Plus X Genie Music Awards	OST Award	"Can't Go"	Nominated	
