= One Line (film) =

- Theatrical poster
- Hangul: 원라인
- RR: Won rain
- MR: Wŏn rain
- Directed by: Yang Kyung-mo
- Written by: Yang Kyung-mo
- Produced by: Kwak Joong-hoon
- Starring: Yim Si-wan; Jin Goo; Park Byung-eun; Lee Dong-hwi; Kim Sun-young
- Cinematography: Kang Gook-hyun
- Edited by: Lee Jin
- Music by: Lee Joon-oh
- Production company: MiiN Pictures
- Distributed by: Next Entertainment World
- Release date: March 29, 2017
- Running time: 132 minutes
- Country: South Korea
- Language: Korean
- Box office: US$2.97 million

One Line (Korean: 원라인) is a 2017 South Korean crime-thriller film written and directed by Yang Kyung-mo, that starred Yim Si-wan, Jin Goo, Park Byung-eun, Lee Dong-hwi and Kim Sun-young.

== Synopsis ==
The story of a relatively ordinary college student who meets a legendary swindler.

== Cast ==
- Yim Si-wan as Min-jae
- Jin Goo as Suk-goo
- Park Byung-eun as Ji-won
- Lee Dong-hwi as Senior Manager Song
- Kim Sun-young as Assistant Manager Hong
- Ahn Se-ha as Detective Chun
- Park Jong-hwan as Ki-tae
- Kim Hong-pa as Director Baek
- Park Yu-hwan as Hyuk-jin
- Park Hyung-soo as Secretary Han
- Wang Ji-won as Hae-sun
- Kim Gook-hee as Joo-hee
- Jo Woo-jin as Prosecutor Won
- Lee Suk-ho as Moon-soo
- Lee Do-hyun as Mr. Park
- Park Sung-yeon as Ms. Choi
- Oh Min-ae as Joo-hee's Mother
- Park Keun-rok as Hotel Man
- Na Soo-yoon as Min-jae's Loan Employee
- Shin Dong-ryuk as Mr. Ma
- Kwon Bum-taek as Vice President Kwon of Dong-ah Bank
- Kim Jung-soo as Vice President Kim of Seoul Bank
- Shin Jung-sup as Vice President Shin of Jo-sun Bank
- Kang Jin-ah as Cemetery Employee
- Kim Ga-eun as Employee of Saessak Loan
- Jun Kwang-jin as Sky Lounge Customer
- Kim Keun-young as Pork Restaurant Owner
- Lee Il-hwa as Young-hee (cameo)

== Production ==
The filming began in January 2016.
