= Quick (2011 film) =

- Promotion poster
- Hangul: 퀵
- RR: Kwik
- MR: K'wik
- Directed by: Jo Beom-goo
- Written by: Park Su-jin
- Produced by: Lee Sang-yong; Yoon Je-kyoon; Gil Young-min; Lee Han-seung
- Starring: Lee Min-ki; Kang Ye-won; Kim In-kwon
- Cinematography: Kim Young-ho
- Edited by: Shin Min-kyung
- Music by: Dalpalan
- Production company: JK Film
- Distributed by: CJ Entertainment
- Release dates: July 20, 2011 (South Korea); July 29, 2011 (Baltimore)
- Running time: 115 minutes
- Country: South Korea
- Language: Korean
- Box office: US$21.5 million

Quick (Korean: 퀵) is a 2011 South Korean action comedy film.

== Plot ==
Seoul, 2004. A group of bikers are joy-riding through the streets and while their leader the teenage Han Ki-su (Lee Min-ki) is tearfully berated by girlfriend Chun-shim (Kang Ye-won) for scorning her, the biker Kim Myung-shik (Kim In-kwon), who is attracted to Chun-shim, watches dolefully. Following some heavy traffic, Ki-su executes a perfect bike jump over it.

Six years later, Ki-su is working as a bike messenger. He delivers a package to an office; the building blows up just after he leaves. Ki-su doesn't think his package was connected to the blast. Ki-su is later asked to drive Ah-rom, the lead vocalist of girl group OK Girls, to a televised stadium concert that she is late for. To his surprise, he finds that she is actually Chun-shim, who is still angry at how she was treated years earlier. He offers her his helmet, unaware that it's been switched for an identical one rigged with an explosive. Ki-su receives a phone call and is told to deliver three packages already stowed in his bike, with a 30-minute delivery time limit for each package. If they exceed the time limit or if Chun-shim tries to take off the helmet, it will explode. Meanwhile, the police, led by Detective Seo (Ko Chang-seok) and NPCC team leader Kim (Ju Jin-mo) examine the CCTV tape in the building that exploded and believe that Ki-su could be the bomber. Ki-su delivers Chun-shim to the concert just in time. She performs in the helmet. The two of them start to make the deliveries while being hunted by the police and trying to figure out who is responsible for the bombings while driving between Seoul and Incheon.

== Cast ==
- Lee Min-ki - Gi-soo
- Kang Ye-won - Ah-rom
- Kim In-kwon - Myung-sik
- Ko Chang-seok - Detective Seo
- Yoon Je-kyoon - Eok-jo
- Song Jae-ho - Han-soo
- Kim So-jin - Team manager
- Kim Byung-chul - Detective Park
- Yoo Seung-mok - Lee Do-hyung
- Lee Hae-in - Chun-shim's alumni (cameo)

== Reception ==
The film ranked third and grossed over ₩4 billion in its first week of release. It grossed a total of over ₩22 billion after seven weeks of screening.

Film Business Asia gave the film a seven out of ten rating, comparing it to the action comedy films produced by Luc Besson, opining that it was an "action movie that's fast, furious and (thankfully) funny".
