= To Catch a Virgin Ghost =

- Theatrical poster
- Hangul: 시실리 2km
- Hanja: 時失里2km
- RR: Sisilli 2 km
- MR: Sisilli 2 km
- Directed by: Shin Jung-won
- Written by: Lee Chang-si; Hwang In-ho
- Produced by: Jonathan Kim
- Starring: Im Chang-jung; Kwon Oh-joong; Shin Yi; Lim Eun-kyung
- Cinematography: Oh Hyun-je
- Edited by: Kim Du-jin
- Music by: Kang Jae-hyeok
- Distributed by: Showbox
- Release date: August 13, 2004 (South Korea)
- Running time: 109 minutes
- Country: South Korea
- Language: Korean
- Box office: US$7.2 million

Sisily 2 km (Korean: 시실리 2km), released internationally as To Catch a Virgin Ghost, is a 2004 South Korean horror-comedy film about a gang that steals a large diamond and escapes to a small town named Sisily, where they encounter deceitful villagers with dark pasts. It was the directorial debut of Shin Jung-won.
