= Spellbound (2011 film) =

- Promotional poster for Spellbound
- Hangul: 오싹한 연애
- Hanja: 오싹한 戀愛
- Lit.: Chilling Romance
- RR: Ossakhan yeonae
- MR: Ossakhan yŏnae
- Directed by: Hwang In-ho
- Written by: Hwang In-ho
- Produced by: An Young-jin
- Starring: Son Ye-jin; Lee Min-ki
- Cinematography: Lee Doo-man
- Edited by: Steve M. Choe
- Music by: Lee Jae-jin
- Production companies: Sangsang Film; CJ Entertainment
- Distributed by: CJ Entertainment
- Release date: 1 December 2011 (South Korea)
- Running time: 114 minutes
- Country: South Korea
- Language: Korean
- Box office: US$18.8 million

Spellbound (Korean: 오싹한 연애; RR: Ossakhan yeonae; lit. 'Chilling Romance'), also known as My Girlfriend Can See Ghosts, is a 2011 South Korean horror romantic comedy film, starring Son Ye-jin and Lee Min-ki. It is about a magician who falls in love with a woman who can see ghosts. It was written and directed by Hwang In-ho which also marks his directorial debut.

== Plot ==
Jo-goo, a street magician (Lee Min-ki), notices a miserable looking girl, Yeo-ri (Son Ye-jin), in the audience during one of his performances, and she winds up being the inspiration for his “Horror magic show.” The show becomes a runaway success almost overnight and Jo-goo in turn, is now a successful stage magician with a model girlfriend. Yeo-ri works for Jo-goo, playing the specter in his show. Forward to almost a year later, the darkness inside her, something her colleagues sense, keeps her from truly connecting with them. When Jo-goo's attempts to include Yeo-ri in a staff dinner finally succeeds, hilarious disaster ensues when she ends up blindingly drunk. Jo-goo calls Yeo-ri the next morning to sort things out, but when the phone disconnects with a weird sound, he decides to drop by her place for a visit instead. There, Jo-goo meets and engages in a game of hide-and-seek with a ghost child, which then scares him later that night. As the two of them spend more time together, developing a fast friendship, Yeo-ri confesses the long story behind her gray, wan face.

Yeo-ri has acquired an 'unwanted' ability to see the dead ever since she survived a high school automobile accident. She not only sees dead people, but these 'dead people' also appear in her life on a regular basis. In particular, the vengeful ghost of her best friend Joo-hee, who died during that automobile incident, follows her everywhere scaring people around her relentlessly. Yeo-ri eventually ends up leading a solitary life, even her family has fled the country and left her behind. She sleeps in a tent in her living room, speaks to a friend sometimes and only through the phone, resigning herself to the idea that her solitary life is best in the grand scheme of things.

During the course of Jo-goo's failed attempts to find his lonely friend Yeo-ri a boyfriend, the pair start to develop feelings for each other. And though Jo-goo is sometimes scared witless himself, he loves Yeo-ri enough to overcome his fear. Joo-hee, consumed by jealousy, becomes a threat during the show, prompting Yeo-ri to head off to join her family in order to protect Jo-goo from herself and the ghost. Is getting away going to be that easy, or does Joo-hee have more tricks up her sleeves?

== Cast ==
- Son Ye-jin - Kang Yeo-ri
- Lee Min-ki - Ma Jo-goo
- Park Chul-min - Pil-dong
- Kim Hyun-sook - Min-jung
- Lee Mi-do - Yoo-jin
- Yoon Ji-min - Sun-woo
- Lee Hyun-jin - Ki-woo
- Hwang Seung-eon - Lee Joo-hee
- Uhm Tae-goo - Magic show producer

== Box office ==
The film sold 590,232 tickets during its opening weekend of December 9 to 11, and grossed ₩3.7 billion in its first week of release. It received 1.6 million admissions after two weeks, 1.91 million by December 18, and more than 2.29 million by December 21. In total, the film had 3,009,356 admissions nationwide, with a gross of ₩22,010,977,000 after six weeks of screening, making it the 7th top-grossing Korean film of 2011, and by far the most successful Korean romantic comedy in recent years.

== Awards and nominations ==
| Year | Award | Category | Recipient | Result |
|---|---|---|---|---|
| 2012 | 48th Baeksang Arts Awards | Best Actress | Son Ye-jin | Nominated |

== Adaptations ==
=== Film adaptation ===
A Philippine adaptation of Spellbound was released on February 1, 2023 by Viva Films. The film stars Bela Padilla and Marco Gumabao.

=== Drama adaptation ===
A 2026 South Korean 12-episode drama adaptation titled Spooky in Love will be aired on tvN on July 18, 2026. Produced by CJ ENM, CJ ENM Studios, B.pic, and the original movie's production company Sangsang Film, the series stars Park Eun-bin, Yang Se-jong, and Ong Seong-wu.
