= Hyper Knife =

2025 South Korean television series

- Promotional poster
- Hangul: 하이퍼나이프
- RR: Haipeo naipeu
- MR: Haip'ŏ naip'ŭ
- Genre: Medical drama; Crime thriller
- Written by: Kim Sun-hee
- Directed by: Kim Jung-hyun
- Starring: Park Eun-bin; Sul Kyung-gu; Yoon Chan-young; Park Byung-eun
- Music by: Beak Eun-woo
- Country of origin: South Korea
- Original language: Korean
- No. of episodes: 8

Production
- Production companies: CJ ENM Studios; Dongpung Co., Ltd.; Blaad Studios

Original release
- Network: Disney+
- Release: March 19 – April 9, 2025

Hyper Knife (Korean: 하이퍼나이프) is a 2025 South Korean medical crime thriller television series written by Kim Sun-hee, directed by Kim Jung-hyun, and starring Park Eun-bin, Sul Kyung-gu, Yoon Chan-young, and Park Byung-eun. The series is about a once genius neurosurgeon and her mentor. It was released on Disney+ on from March 19, to April 9, 2025.

== Synopsis ==
Dr. Jung Se-ok, a brilliant but disgraced neurosurgeon, is haunted by a past tragedy. Stripped of her medical license, she resorts to performing illegal surgeries in the shadows, driven by an insatiable thirst for pushing the boundaries of neuroscience. When her path crosses with her former mentor, the renowned but enigmatic Dr. Choi Deok-hee, old wounds are reopened and a dangerous game of power and revenge ensues. As Se-ok delves deeper into groundbreaking yet ethically questionable procedures, she grapples with the moral consequences of her actions, blurring the lines between medical necessity and personal ambition.

== Cast and characters ==
- Park Eun-bin as Jung Se-ok

A shadow doctor who was once called a genius neurosurgeon.

- Sul Kyung-gu as Choi Deok-hee

A neurosurgeon and Se-ok's former mentor.

- Yoon Chan-young as Seo Young-joo

Se-ok's ally who is always by her side.

- Park Byung-eun as Han Hyun-ho

An anesthesiologist.

- Lee Jung-shik as Ha U-yeong

Neurosurgery director.

== Production ==
=== Development ===
Writer Kim Sun-hee, who wrote Quiz of God: Reboot (2018), and director Kim Jung-hyun, who directed Awaken (2021–2022) and Crazy Love (2022), teamed up for the series. CJENM Studios, Dongpung Co., Ltd. and Blaad Studios managed the production.

=== Casting ===
In 2023, Sul Kyung-gu and Park Eun-bin were both considering appearing for the series. In 2024, both Yoon Chan-young and Park Byung-eun reportedly received an offer to appear alongside Sul and Park. On April 3, the four actors were officially confirmed to play various roles in the series.

=== Filming ===
Principal photography began in April 2024.

== Release ==
On August 12, 2024, Disney+ announced that Hyper Knife would be released in the first half of 2025. On January 7, 2025, Disney+ confirmed the release date of the series to be on March 19, after unveiling the lineup of the platform's original Korean dramas for 2025.

== Reception ==
=== Accolades ===
Award ceremony	Year	Category	Nominee	Result	Ref.
Bechdel Day	2025	Bechdel Choice 10	Hyper Knife	Placed	
Blue Dragon Series Awards	2025	Best Actress	Park Eun-bin	Nominated	
Blue Dragon Series Awards	2025	Best Supporting Actor	Park Byung-eun	Nominated	
Global OTT Awards	2025	Best Lead Actress	Park Eun-bin	Won	
Seoul International Drama Awards	2025	Best Miniseries	Hyper Knife	Nominated	
International Emmy Awards	2026	TV Movie/Mini-series	Hyper Knife	Pending	
