= Monster (2014 film) =

- Theatrical release poster
- Directed by: Hwang In-ho
- Written by: Hwang In-ho
- Produced by: Kim Min-kyoung; Ahn Sang-hoon
- Starring: Lee Min-ki; Kim Go-eun
- Cinematography: Kim Gi-tae
- Edited by: Steve M. Choe; Park Gyeong-suk
- Music by: Lee Jae-jin
- Distributed by: Lotte Entertainment
- Release date: March 13, 2014 (South Korea)
- Running time: 113 minutes
- Country: South Korea
- Language: Korean
- Box office: US$3.8 million

Monster (Korean: 몬스터) is a 2014 South Korean action thriller film written and directed by Hwang In-ho, starring Lee Min-ki and Kim Go-eun.

== Plot ==
Independent and aggressive, Bok-soon is known around the neighborhood as a "psycho bitch" because of her weird behavior. She is "slow" and not very smart due to a developmental disability, but is nonetheless a brave young woman with a happy inner world. Bok-soon manages to make a living by running a street stall at the local market with her younger sister Eun-jeong, whom she loves more than life itself. The name-calling doesn't affect her at all, and she only cares about working hard and saving up money for Eun-jeong's education. Their relatively peaceful life is disrupted when Tae-soo, who lives alone in a deserted forest, kills Bok-soon's beloved sister because Eun-jeong may have stumbled upon the truth of his murderous lifestyle. Bok-soon is completely consumed by her grief, madness and uncontrollable rage. Despite her limited mental ability, she begins planning her revenge, and joins up with Na-ri, a little girl who is being chased by Tae-soo, after he killed her elder sister Yeon-Hee.

Tae-soo is a merciless, unpredictable serial killer who commits brutal murders for no reason, then methodically covers up his tracks. He cares deeply for his adoptive family, stepmother Kyeong-ja and older brother Ik-sang, who took him in as a young boy. But it was his family's opportunistic attitude to exploit Tae-soo despite their disgust and fear towards him that only aggravated the loneliness and monstrosity within him.

Eventually, Kyeong-ja and Ik-sang secretly bring in some gangsters to her restaurant in an attempt to kill Tae-soo, whom they invited for a meal. With his animalistic senses, Tae-soo escapes death, but ends up getting terribly injured, yet manages to kill them all, his stepmother and her son and apparently Na-ri (whom Tae-soo took along). Bok-soon finds Tae-soo just then, and a deadly battle unfolds between this frail but strong young woman and the bemused, ruthless killer that ruined her life. After finally stabbing him to death, she finds out that the little girl is alive. Then Yeon-Hee's ex-boss appears, who previously asked Ik-sang to buy Yeon-Hee's phone from its owner, so she can't blackmail him with recorded video showing his abusive behavior towards her. But Tae-soo, asked by his step-brother to make the purchase, kept the money, phone and killed Yeon-Hee instead. Asked by Yeon-Hee's ex-boss to give him the phone, Bok-soon does this and leave the gory restaurant with Na-ri.

== Cast ==
- Lee Min-ki as Tae-soo
- Kim Go-eun as Bok-soon
- Kim Roi-ha as Ik-sang
- Kim Boo-seon as Kyeong-ja
- Ahn Seo-hyun as Na-ri
- Kim Bo-ra as Eun-jeong
- Nam Gyeong-eup as Boss Jeon
- Han Da-eun as Yeon-hee
- Park Byung-eun as Kwang-soo
- Bae Seong-woo as Seong-moon
- Kim Gyung-ae as Bok-soon's grandmother
- Heo Joon-seok as leader of demolition team
- Yoo Jae-myung as country police constable
- Park Chul-min as Boss Park (cameo)

== Reception ==
Monster was released in theaters on March 13, 2014. Writer-director Hwang In-ho experimented by combining thriller and comedy elements and pushing genre conventions to their extremes with strong stylistic overtones, but some reviews called the film "awkward," "unharmonious" and "almost schizophrenic" as a result, while others criticized a perceived misogyny beneath the film's ostensible message of female empowerment. This negative criticism seemed to affect its early run, drawing 88,995 viewers on its opening weekend, behind Thread of Lies and 300: Rise of an Empire. It recorded 357,000 admissions and ₩2.85 billion (US$2.66 million) for its first week.
