= Lee Min-ki =

South Korean actor (born 1985)

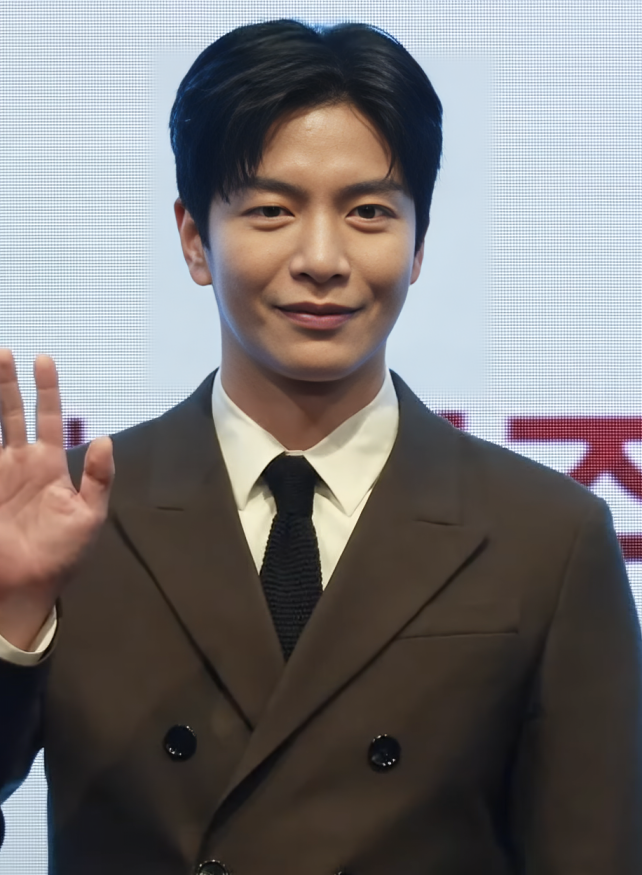
- Lee in November 2024
- Born: January 16, 1985 (age 41); Gimhae, South Korea
- Education: Konkuk University - Film Arts; Daekyeung University - Modeling
- Occupations: Actor; singer; model
- Years active: 2004–present
- Agent: Sangyoung ENT
- Height: 1.83 m (6 ft 0 in)

Korean name
- Hangul: 이민기
- Hanja: 李民基
- RR: I Mingi
- MR: I Min'gi

Lee Min-ki (Korean: 이민기; born January 16, 1985) is a South Korean actor, singer, and model. Lee's first leading role in television was in the 2005 sports drama Taereung National Village. He has gone on to star in many television series, including Love Truly (2006), Dal-ja's Spring (2007), Because This Is My First Life (2017), The Beauty Inside (2018), My Liberation Notes (2022) and Behind Your Touch (2023). Lee has also starred in feature films, most notably in the box office hits Tidal Wave (2009), Quick (2011), Spellbound (2011) and Very Ordinary Couple (2013).

== Career ==
=== Acting ===
After honing his acting in one-act dramas, Lee Min-ki first gained popularity on television in romantic comedies Love Truly (2006) and Dal-ja's Spring (2007). He then starred in the quirky low-rated cult series Evasive Inquiry Agency (2007) and alternated mainstream films with indies such as Oishii Man (2009). He gained favorable notices for his supporting roles in the thriller A Million as a hot-tempered Marine-turned-janitor who finds himself involved in a survival reality show, and the disaster film Tidal Wave, in which he plays a lifeguard who makes a heartbreaking sacrifice when a tsunami hits the Korean beach town of Haeundae. Lee then solidified his bona fide movie star status with his leading roles in the action film Quick and romantic comedy Spellbound.

Lee starred alongside Kim Min-hee in the relationship drama Very Ordinary Couple (2013), a critically-acclaimed a box-office hit. He followed with leading roles in thriller Monster (2014), action noir For the Emperor (2014), and drama film Shoot Me in the Heart (2015), based on the bestselling novel of the same name by Jeong Yu-jeong.

In 2017, Lee starred in the romantic-comedy drama Because This Is My First Life opposite Jung So-min, which had been his first television leading role in 10 years. This was followed with the fantasy melodrama The Beauty Inside (2018), based on the 2015 romantic comedy film of the same name. He played a man who suffers from prosopagnosia.

In 2019, Lee returned to the small screen opposite Lee Yoo-young in the crime detective drama The Lies Within as detective Jo Tae-sik. On January 13, 2020, it was announced that Lee would star in the occult thriller film Three Days alongside Park Shin-yang and Lee Re.

In 2021, Lee starred alongside Nana in the MBC romantic comedy Oh My Ladylord. After the contract with his former agency expired in September 2021, Lee signed a contract with Yeongsang ENT. The same year, he joined the JTBC television series My Liberation Notes which premiered in April 2022. He played the role of Yeom Chang-hee, the second of three siblings with no proper goal in life.

In 2026, Lee starred in dark comedy short film Grim Reaper Life Extension Project as Kang-rim, a senior grim reaper who always deviates from the rules but ranks first in performance, alongside Monsta X's Hyungwon.

=== Singing ===
After performing a stylized version of "My Way" at the 2008 Mnet KM Music Festival, Lee lent his vocals to a track with Korean electronica/pop singer Sheean in a collaboration with Japanese electronica/Shibuya-kei artist FreeTEMPO. The song, titled "Power of Love," was released as a digital single, and Lee also appeared in the music video. On August 11, 2009, he unveiled his musical debut No Kidding, a six track EP with a very indie-electro rock sound. The album's title song "Eternal Summer" was the first and only single released. In 2013, he released two singles titled "Those Days I Had with You" and "Everything" in collaboration with Gold Coast.

== Personal life ==
=== Military service ===
Lee enlisted for his mandatory military service on August 7, 2014, and was assigned as a public service worker. He was discharged in August 2016.

=== Tax audit ===
In May 2026 Sangyoung ENT said Lee had paid additional tax after an audit related to a one-person corporation. The agency did not disclose the amount or further details of the audit. It stated that Lee had cooperated and submitted documents, that the shortfall came from differing interpretations of expense-booking rules in corporate operations, that there had been no intentional concealment of income or fraudulent evasion, and that the assessed amount had been paid through the required procedures.

== Filmography ==
=== Film ===
Year	Title	Role	Notes	Ref.
2006	Riverbank Legends	High school student #7	Special appearance	
2007	A Good Day to Have an Affair	College student		
2008	Humming	Oh Chun-jae	Special appearance	
2008	Romantic Island	Lee Jung-hwan		
2009	Oishii Man	Kim Hyun-seok		
2009	Tidal Wave	Choi Hyeong-sik		
2009	A Million	Park Cheol-hee		
2011	Quick	Han Ki-su		
2011	Spellbound	Ma Jo-goo		
2013	Very Ordinary Couple	Lee Dong-hee		
2014	Monster	Tae-soo		
2014	For the Emperor	Lee Hwan		
2015	Shoot Me in the Heart	Ryu Seung-min		
2018	Detective K: Secret of the Living Dead	Jeon In-kyul	Special appearance	
2022	Decibel	Captain Hwang	Special appearance	
2024	Devil's Stay	Priest Van		
2026	Grim Reaper Life Extension Project	Kang-rim	Short film	

=== Television series ===
Year	Title	Role	Notes	Ref.
2004	My Older Brother	Kang Min-ki	Drama City	
2005	Oh! Sarah	Kim Dong-kang	Drama City	
2005	Be Strong, Geum-soon!	Noh Tae-hwan		
2005	Booyong of Mt. Kyeryong	Hyeong-soo	Drama City	
2005	Taereung National Village	Hong Min-ki	Drama City	
2005	Rainbow Romance	Lee Min-ki		
2006	Love Truly	Nam Bong-ki		
2007	Dal-ja's Spring	Kang Tae-bong		
2007	Evasive Inquiry Agency	Park Mu-yeol		
2012	Flower Band	Joo Byung-hee	Guest, Episodes 1-2	
2017	Because This Is My First Life	Nam Se-hee		
2018	What's Wrong with Secretary Kim	young Kim Young-man	Cameo, Episode 10	
2018	The Beauty Inside	Seo Do-jae		
2019	The Lies Within	Jo Tae-sik		
2021	Oh My Ladylord	Han Bi-soo		
2022	My Liberation Notes	Yeom Chang-hee		
2023	Behind Your Touch	Moon Jang-yeol		
2024	Crash	Cha Yeon-ho		
2024	Face Me	Cha Jung-woo		
2025	Mary Kills People	Jo Hyun-woo / Ban Ji-hoon		
2026	The Scarecrow	Cha Yeon-ho	Special appearance	

=== Music video appearances ===
Year	Song title	Artist	Ref.
2004	"Hit'm"	Nina	
2005	"Only One for Me"	Soul Star	
2007	"After... The Break-up"	The Name feat. Choi Jin-yi	
2008	"My Girl"	The One	
2012	"The Day Before"	Nell	
2013	"I'm Sorry"	Han So-hyeon	
2021	"Beautiful Jeopardy (위로 危路)"	Nell	

== Discography ==
=== Albums ===
Album information	Track listing
Power of Love: Single; Artist: FreeTEMPO feat. Sheean and Lee Min-ki; Released: September 26, 2008; Label:	Track listing: 1. Power of Love
Power of Love Part 2: Single; Artist: FreeTEMPO feat. Lee Min-ki; Released: November 14, 2008; Label:	Track listing: 1. Power of Love (3rd Coast Remix)
We Can't Forget the Reason: Single; Artist: Lee Min-ki feat. Weekenders; Released: December 10, 2008; Label:	Track listing: 1. We Can't Forget the Reason; 2. We Can't Forget the Reason (Inst.)
No Kidding: EP; Artist: Lee Min-ki; Released: August 11, 2009; Label: Locksmith by Shyoshyo Type/CJ E&M	Track listing: 1. 영원한 여름 (Eternal Summer); 2. Dreaming; 3. Joujou (Let me see the love); 4. Play My Way; 5. Tonite, Tonite; 6. Joujou (♥Minki Remix)
Those Days I Had with You: Single; Artist: Lee Min-ki feat. 3rd Coast; Released: March 14, 2013; Label: Go_od/CJ E&M	Track listing: 1. 지난날 (Those Days I Had with You); 2. 지난날 (Those Days I Had with You) (Inst.)
Everything: Single; Artist: Lee Min-ki feat. 3rd Coast; Released: April 11, 2013; Label: Go_od/CJ E&M	Track listing: 1. Everything; 2. Everything (Inst.)

=== Soundtrack appearances ===
Year	Song title	Notes
2006	"Like Candy 2"	Track from Love Truly OST
2006	"Before Sadness Comes"	Track from Rainbow Romance OST
2009	"Frozen Mountain" "Neanderthal Man II" "Disappears Like That" "A Match for You"	Tracks from Oishii Man OST
2012	"Not in Love" "jaywalking"	Track from Flower Band OST

== Awards and nominations ==
Year	Award	Category	Nominated work	Result	Ref.
2004	KBS Drama Awards	Best Actor in a Special/One-Act Drama	My Older Brother	Nominated	
2005	KBS Drama Awards	Best Actor in a Special/One-Act Drama	Oh! Sarah, Booyong of Mt. Kyeryong	Nominated	
2005	MBC Drama Awards	Best New Actor	Be Strong, Geum-soon!	Won	
2007	43rd Baeksang Arts Awards	Best New Actor (TV)	Love Truly	Nominated	
2007	28th Blue Dragon Film Awards	Best New Actor	A Good Day to Have an Affair	Nominated	
2007	KBS Drama Awards	Excellence Award, Actor in a Miniseries	Dal-ja's Spring, Evasive Inquiry Agency	Nominated	
2007	KBS Drama Awards	Popularity Award, Actor	Dal-ja's Spring, Evasive Inquiry Agency	Nominated	
2009	2nd Style Icon Awards	New Movie Icon	—N/a	Won	
2009	30th Blue Dragon Film Awards	Best Supporting Actor	Haeundae	Nominated	
2010	46th Baeksang Arts Awards	Best New Actor (Film)	Haeundae	Won	
2014	50th Baeksang Arts Awards	Most Popular Actor (Film)	Monster	Nominated	
2018	13th Soompi Awards	Actor of the Year	Because This Is My First Life	Nominated	
2018	13th Soompi Awards	Best Couple Award with Jung So-min	Because This Is My First Life	Nominated	
2019	14th Soompi Awards	Best Couple Award with Seo Hyun-jin	The Beauty Inside	Nominated	
2021	MBC Drama Awards	Best Couple Award with Nana	Oh My Ladylord	Nominated	
2023	Global Film & Television Huading Awards	Best Global Teleplay Leading Actor	My Liberation Notes	Nominated	
