= Castaway Diva =

2023 South Korean television series

- Promotional poster
- Hangul: 무인도의 디바
- Hanja: 無人島의 디바
- Lit.: Diva of the Deserted Island
- RR: Muindoui diba
- MR: Muindoŭi tiba
- Genre: Coming-of-age; Musical; Romantic comedy
- Developed by: Studio Dragon (planning)
- Written by: Park Hye-ryun; Eun Yeol
- Directed by: Oh Chung-hwan
- Starring: Park Eun-bin; Kim Hyo-jin; Chae Jong-hyeop; Cha Hak-yeon; Kim Joo-hun
- Music by: Kim Kyu-nam; Park Se-joon
- Country of origin: South Korea
- Original language: Korean
- No. of episodes: 12

Production
- Executive producer: So Jae-hyun
- Producers: Lee Dong-eun; Shin Su-jin
- Running time: 80 minutes
- Production companies: Baram Pictures; Kakao Entertainment

Original release
- Network: tvN
- Release: October 28 – December 3, 2023

Castaway Diva (Korean: 무인도의 디바) is a 2023 South Korean television series directed by Oh Choong-hwan, written by Park Hye-ryun and Eun Yeol, and starring Park Eun-bin, Kim Hyo-jin, Chae Jong-hyeop, Cha Hak-yeon and Kim Joo-hun. It premiered on tvN from October 28 to December 3, 2023, and aired every Saturday and Sunday at 21:20 (KST) for 12 episodes. It is also available for streaming on Netflix in selected regions.

== Synopsis ==
Seo Mok-ha (Park Eun-bin) is a girl who dreams of becoming a diva, or K-pop idol. She wins a UCC competition and goes to Seoul for an audition, gets stranded on an uninhabited island due to an unfortunate accident and returns to the world after 15 years. Trying to readjust to society, she gets the chance of a lifetime when her idol is performing at a local event, although she is washed up due to her decline in fame during those 15 years. Wanting to give back to her idol's being her reason to live, she becomes her idol's manager, helping her achieve stardom once more.

Apart from the tenacity (and luck) needed to have survived alone on a desert island for 15 years, there is also a subplot or theme running through about domestic violence, escaping it and managing to live a happy life with non-toxic people.

== Cast ==
=== Main ===
- Park Eun-bin as Seo Mok-ha
  - Lee A-Rin as child Seo Mok-ha
  - Lee Re as young Seo Mok-ha

A girl who dreams of auditioning to become a diva, cast away from society for 15 years until she is rescued.

- Kim Hyo-jin as Yoon Ran-joo
  - Han Da-in as child Yoon Ran-joo
  - Son Ye-rin as young Yoon Ran-joo

A gorgeous top star and diva that Mok-ha loves. Washed up after needing vocal cord surgery.

- Chae Jong-hyeop as Kang Bo-geol / Jung Ki-ho
  - Moon Woo-jin as young Kang Bo-geol / young Jung Ki-ho

Mok-ha's middle school classmate who's now a producer at YGN's entertainment department.

- Cha Hak-yeon as Kang Woo-hak / Jung Chae-ho
  - Kang Tae-ung as young Kang Woo-hak / Jung Chae-ho

Bo-geol's older brother and a YGN news reporter.

=== Supporting ===
==== Bo-geol and Woo-hak's family ====
- Seo Jeong-yeon as Song Ha-jeong / Yang Jae-kyung

Woo-hak and Bo-geol's mother who runs a hair salon.

- Lee Joong-ok as Kang Sang-du / Lee Uk

Woo-hak and Bo-geol's adoptive father.

==== RJ Entertainment ====
- Kim Joo-hun as Lee Seo-joon

Ran-joo's former manager, who is currently a CEO of RJ Entertainment.

- Bae Gang-hee as Eun Mo-rae

The most popular singer under RJ Entertainment.

- Shin Joo-hyup as Park Yong-gwan

Seo-joon's right-hand man and Mo-rae's manager at RJ Entertainment.

==== Nth Primetime team ====
- Kim Bo-jung as Hong Yeon-kyung

'Nth Primetime' main producer.

- Yoon Jeong-hoon as Ahn Dong-min

'Nth Primetime' assistant director.

==== People in Chunsam Island ====
- Lee Seung-joon as Jung Bong-wan

Ki-ho and Chae-ho's father who is a police officer at the police station.

- Kim Min-seok as Han Dae-woong

An insurance agent and Mok-ha's classmate before she fell to the uninhabited island in an accident.

- Oh Kyung-hwa as Moon Young-ju

Mok-ha's best friend and Dae-woong's wife.

- Lee Yoo-joon as Seo Jeong-ho

Mok-ha's father who runs a raw fish restaurant.

==== People around Yoon Ran-joo ====
- Song Kyung-cheol as Hwang Byung-gak
  - Kim Min-soo as young Hwang Byung-gak

CEO of Sugar Entertainment, Yoon Ran-joo's former entertainment company

- Moon Sook as Go San-hee
  - Yang Seo-yoon as 20-years-old Go San-hee
  - Woo Hyun-zoo as 50-years-old Go San-hee

Yoon Ran-joo's mother who identifies herself as her daughter because of her condition.

- Kang Myung-joo as bar owner

=== Extended ===
- Oh Ji-hye as Dr. Kim
- Oh Eui-sik as reporter Bong Du-hyeon
- Park Mi-sook as Cha Mi-hye

A popular stylist who worked with Yoon Ran-joo and Eun Mo-rae

- Min Sung-Wook as Prosecutor Lee Ji-Gwang

== Production ==
=== Development ===
The series marked the third collaboration between director Oh Choong-hwan and screenwriter Park Hye-ryun after While You Were Sleeping (2017) and Start-Up (2020). Star News reported that the drama is being discussed to release on tvN's Saturday and Sunday timeslot in the second half of 2023.

=== Filming ===
On March 9, 2023, it was reported that the series had finished its first script reading on March 8 in Seoul, and would begin filming soon. On October 30, 2023, the series finished all filming and on the afternoon of November 2, the after-party was held at a restaurant in Yeouido, Seoul.

== Original soundtrack ==
=== Soundtrack album ===
Castaway Diva Original Sound Track

Soundtrack album by Various Artists
- Released: December 5, 2023
- Genre: Soundtrack
- Length: 4:54:33
- Languages: Korean; English
- Labels: MusicBuddy; Kakao

Singles from Seo Mok-ha (Park Eun-bin)
- 1. "Someday" Released: October 31, 2023; 2. "Night and Day (Acoustic Ver.)" Released: November 7, 2023; 3. "Night and Day (Contest Ver.)" Released: November 7, 2023; 4. "Mint" Released: November 14, 2023; 5. "Here I am" Released: November 14, 2023; 6. "Open Your Eyes" Released: November 21, 2023; 7. "Until The End" Released: November 28, 2023; 8. "Dream Us (Acoustic Ver.)" Released: December 2, 2023; 9. "Dream Us (Original Ver.)" Released: December 2, 2023

Singles from Castaway Diva
- 1. "Rest" Released: October 28, 2023; 2. "Butterfly" Released: October 29, 2023; 3. "Icarus" Released: November 4, 2023; 4. "Night and Day" Released: November 5, 2023; 5. "We are" Released: November 11, 2023; 6. "My Days" Released: November 12, 2023; 7. "I'll Pray For You" Released: November 18, 2023; 8. "Voyage" Released: November 19, 2023; 9. "You're leaving like the season" Released: November 25, 2023

The show's soundtrack album was released on December 5, 2023. It peaked at number thirty on the weekly Circle Album Chart as of January 6, 2024.

Disc 1
No.	Title	Lyrics	Music	Artist	Length
1.	"Someday"	Taibian	Taibian, Coda	Park Eun-bin	3:53
2.	"Fly Away"	Song Yang-ha, Kim Jae-hyun, Vlue	Song Yang-ha, Kim Jae-hyun, Vlue	Park Eun-bin	3:04
3.	"Someday, Someway" (지금 우리 멀어진다 해도)	Han Kyung-soo	Han Kyung-soo, Choi Min-joon, Lee Jung-woo	Park Eun-bin	3:56
4.	"Night and Day" (그날 밤; Acoustic Ver)	20 Years Of Age	20 Years Of Age	Park Eun-bin	3:22
5.	"Night and Day" (그날 밤; Contest Ver)	20 Years Of Age	20 Years Of Age	Park Eun-bin	3:47
6.	"Mint"	Taibian	Taibian, Kim Jung-woo (TOXIC)	Park Eun-bin	3:49
7.	"Here I am"	Song Yang-ha, Kim Jae-hyun	Song Yang-ha, Kim Jae-hyun, Cha Joon-hee	Park Eun-bin	3:22
8.	"Open Your Eyes"	Han Ji-soo, Kim Hye-kwang, Choi Sang-un, Kim Hong-joon	Kim Hye-kwang, Kim Hong-joon, Choi Sang-un, Bigguyrobin	Park Eun-bin	4:09
9.	"Until The End"	20 Years Of Age	20 Years Of Age	Park Eun-bin	3:17
10.	"Dream Us" (Acoustic Ver)	Taibian	Taibian	Park Eun-bin	3:54
11.	"Dream Us" (Original Ver)	Taibian	Taibian	Park Eun-bin	4:04
Total length:					40:37

Disc 2
No.	Title	Lyrics	Music	Artist	Length
1.	"Rest" (쉼표)	Lee Mu-jin	Lee Mu-jin	Lee Mu-jin	3:41
2.	"Butterfly" (나비)	Han Kyung-soo, Lee Do-hyung (AUG)	Han Kyung-soo, Lee Do-hyung (AUG)	Young K (Day6)	4:08
3.	"Icarus" (이카루스)	Taibian	Taibian, CHKmate	Dino (Seventeen)	3:32
4.	"Night and Day" (그날 밤)	20 Years Of Age	20 Years Of Age	Jung Seung-hwan	3:02
5.	"We Are" (우리는)	Taibian	Taibian, Bark	The Boyz	3:16
6.	"My Days"	Kim Min-seok	MeloMance	MeloMance	3:28
7.	"I'll Pray For You"	Lee Do-hyung (AUG), Park Jung-joon	Park Jung-joon, Lee Do-hyung (AUG)	Kassy	3:11
8.	"Voyage" (항해)	Lee Ki-hwan	Lee Ki-hwan	Winter	4:15
9.	"You're leaving like the season" (너는 계절처럼 멀어져 가네)	Lee Ki-hwan	Lee Ki-hwan, Moon Ssi (KIPLE)	Sandeul	4:27
10.	"Rest" (쉼표; Inst.)		Lee Mu-jin		3:41
11.	"Butterfly" (나비; Inst.)		Han Kyung-soo, Lee Do-hyung (AUG)		4:08
12.	"Icarus" (이카루스; Inst.)		Taibian, CHKmate		3:32
13.	"Night and Day" (그날 밤; Inst.)		20 Years Of Age		3:02
14.	"We Are" (우리는; Inst.)		Taibian, Bark		3:16
15.	"My Days" (Inst.)		MeloMance		3:28
16.	"I'll Pray For You" (Inst.)		Park Jung-joon, Lee Do-hyung (AUG)		3:11
17.	"Voyage" (항해; Inst.)		Lee Ki-hwan		4:15
18.	"You're leaving like the season" (너는 계절처럼 멀어져 가네; Inst.)		Lee Ki-hwan, Moon Ssi (KIPLE)		4:27
Total length:					1:06:00

Disc 3
No.	Title	Lyrics	Music	Artist	Length
1.	"Pluto" (명왕성)	20 Years Of Age	20 Years Of Age	Shin Joo-hyop	3:31
2.	"The Witches"	Taibian	Taibian, Bark	Uluv	3:16
3.	"Love Time"	Taibian	Taibian, Coda	Lily	3:21
4.	"Picasso" (피카소)	Taibian, Stainboys, Kim Jung-woo (TOXIC)	Taibian, Stainboys, Kim Jung-woo (TOXIC)	Moony	3:26
5.	"Like today is our last day" (마지막 날처럼; Acoustic Ver)	Taibian	Taibian, Dr.Ba$$	Uluv	3:31
6.	"Like today is our last day" (마지막 날처럼; Original Ver)	Taibian	Taibian, Dr.Ba$$	Uluv	3:31
7.	"Pluto" (명왕성; Inst.)		20 Years Of Age		3:31
8.	"The Witches" (Inst.)		Taibian, Bark		3:16
9.	"Love Time" (Inst.)		Taibian, Coda		3:21
10.	"Picasso" (피카소; Inst.)		Taibian, Stainboys, Kim Jung-woo (TOXIC)
11.	"Like today is our last day" (마지막 날처럼; Acoustic Ver; Inst.)		Taibian, Dr.Ba$$		3:31
12.	"Like today is our last day" (마지막 날처럼; Original Ver; Inst.)		Taibian, Dr.Ba$$		3:31
Total length:					41:12

Disc 4
No.	Title	Music	Length
1.	"Overtune For band"	Kim Dong-hyeok	1:54
2.	"Green Light"	Kim Tae-hwan, Park Se-jun	1:33
3.	"For To do"	Yu Hui-hyeon, Park Se-jun	2:51
4.	"Nice Morning"	Woo Ji-hoon	1:46
5.	"Into The Fog"	Na Yun-sik	2:33
6.	"Dream Island"	Kim Ji-ae	3:20
7.	"Fell Piano Sus"	Lee Nyeom	3:23
8.	"Just Kidding Sorry"	Woo Ji-hoon	2:12
9.	"Dull Boy"	Kim Dong-hyeok, Choi Moon-suk	2:06
10.	"Sacred Bowl"	Song Jae-kyeong	3:22
11.	"Don't Try To Hide It"	Yu Hui-hyeon, Park Se-jun	2:20
12.	"Honey In The Hive"	Kim Tae-hwan, Park Se-jun	2:04
13.	"A Habor In A Temple"	Na Yun-sik	2:43
14.	"Pure Girl"	Kim Min-ji	2:19
15.	"Limitless Promise"	Woo Ji-hoon	3:08
16.	"Love Heals"	Kim Dong-hyeok, Choi Moon-suk	2:06
17.	"Grape Gummy"	Kim Ji-ae	2:48
18.	"Time Of Love" (연애의 시간)	Lee Nyeom	3:21
19.	"Rabbit Fairy In The Moon"	Kim Tae-hwan, Park Se-jun	2:14
20.	"Vacant House"	Yu Hui-hyeon, Park Se-jun	1:44
21.	"Mess Of Lines"	Woo Ji-hoon	2:21
22.	"Living Island"	Kim Dong-hyeok, Choi Moon-suk	2:42
23.	"Remember Me"	Kim Ji-ae	3:21
24.	"If We Meet Again"	Woo Ji-hoon, Park Ye-chan	2:51
25.	"Uninhabited Island"	Kim Tae-hwan, Park Se-jun	2:03
26.	"Someday Soon Again"	Na Yun-sik	2:29
27.	"The Forest Of Angels"	Kim Min-ji	2:20
28.	"You Are My Present"	Lee Nyeom	2:54
29.	"Cloud Day Lake"	Yu Hui-hyeon, Park Se-jun	3:13
30.	"Love Structure"	Woo Ji-hoon, Park Ye-chan	2:42
31.	"The land I Lived"	Hwang Seung-pil, Park Se-jun	3:41
32.	"Island In The Sun"	Kim Dong-hyeok, Choi Moon-suk	2:27
33.	"Peach Flower"	Kim Min-ji	2:38
34.	"Newbie"	Kim Tae-hwan, Park Se-jun	1:55
35.	"Memories Of The Beast"	Na Yun-sik	2:30
36.	"Follow The Heart"	Kim Ji-ae	2:35
37.	"Finding My Life Slow"	Lee Nyeom	2:41
38.	"Infinite Moon"	Woo Ji-hoon	2:24
39.	"Step By Step"	Yu Hui-hyeon, Park Se-jun	1:34
40.	"Higher Love"	Kim Dong-hyeok, Choi Moon-suk	2:32
41.	"The Season Of The Canon"	Kim Min-ji	2:39
42.	"New World"	Kim Ji-ae	2:45
43.	"Rainbow Colors"	Woo Ji-hoon	1:50
44.	"Perhaps Today"	Kim Dong-hyeok, Choi Moon-suk	2:40
45.	"The Lonely Leaf"	Kim Min-ji	2:28
46.	"Waiting For You"	Woo Ji-hoon, Park Ye-chan	2:32
47.	"Slow Silence"	Woo Ji-hoon	3:44
48.	"Take To Me"	Kim Ji-ae	2:47
49.	"Wave To Earth"	Yu Hui-hyeon, Park Se-jun	2:28
50.	"Your Tears Are Innocent"	Lee Nyeom	2:53
51.	"This Summer Days"	Na Yun-sik	3:46
52.	"But Life Goes On"	Lee Nyeom	2:44
53.	"Movement Of Moon"	Woo Ji-hoon	3:19
54.	"A Letter"	Kim Dong-hyeok, Choi Moon-suk	2:34
55.	"Missed"	Woo Ji-hoon	2:55
56.	"I Will Sing"	Kim Dong-hyeok, Choi Moon-suk	3:00
Total length:			2:26:44

== Viewership ==
Castaway Diva : South Korea viewers per episode (millions)

Season	Episode number												Average
Season	1	2	3	4	5	6	7	8	9	10	11	12	Average
1	0.787	1.247	1.356	1.854	1.252	1.861	1.361	1.995	1.696	1.935	1.612	2.097	1.588

Source: Audience measurement performed nationwide by Nielsen Korea.

Average TV viewership ratings
Ep.	Original broadcast date	Average audience share (Nielsen Korea)	
Ep.	Original broadcast date	Nationwide	Seoul
1	October 28, 2023	3.172% (1st)	3.450% (1st)
2	October 29, 2023	5.155% (2nd)	5.402% (2nd)
3	November 4, 2023	5.557% (1st)	6.177% (1st)
4	November 5, 2023	7.988% (1st)	8.885% (1st)
5	November 11, 2023	5.390% (1st)	6.163% (1st)
6	November 12, 2023	7.933% (1st)	8.887% (1st)
7	November 18, 2023	6.053% (1st)	6.647% (1st)
8	November 19, 2023	8.680% (1st)	9.354% (1st)
9	November 25, 2023	7.315% (1st)	8.369% (1st)
10	November 26, 2023	7.995% (1st)	8.948% (1st)
11	December 2, 2023	7.285% (1st)	8.140% (1st)
12	December 3, 2023	9.002% (1st)	9.840% (1st)
Average		6.794%	7.522%
In the table above, the blue numbers represent the lowest ratings and the red numbers represent the highest ratings.; This series airs on a cable channel/pay TV which normally has a relatively smaller audience compared to free-to-air TV/public broadcasters (KBS, SBS, MBC and EBS).

== Awards and nominations ==
Name of the award ceremony, year presented, category, nominee of the award, and the result of the nomination
Award ceremony	Year	Category	Nominee(s) / Work(s)	Result	Ref.
TVING Awards	2023	Tear of Year	Castaway Diva	Won	
APAN Star Awards	2023	Best Young Actor	Moon Woo-jin	Nominated	
MAMA Awards	2023	tvN of the Year: Highest ratings for a tvN drama in the second half of 2023	Castaway Diva	Won	
