= Sisa Journal =

South Korean current affairs magazine

- Frequency: Weekly
- Founded: October 1989
- Country: South Korea
- Language: Korean
- Website: www.sisajournal.com

Sisa Journal (Korean: 시사저널; lit. 'Current Affairs Journal') is a South Korean weekly current affairs magazine. It was founded in October 1989.

It also publishes a Sisa Journal American Edition (시사저널 미주판) that it established in March 2017. That edition caters towards Korean Americans and South Korean expatriates in the United States.

In 2006, it was the center of a scandal, when its management stopped the publication of articles that were critical of the company Samsung.
