= List of awards and nominations received by Descendants of the Sun =

This is the list of awards and nominations received by Descendants of the Sun, a 2016 South Korean television series.

== Awards and nominations ==
Year	Award	Category	Recipient(s)	Result	Ref(s).
2016	2016 Asia Rookie Awards	Male Rookie of the Year	Choi Woong	Won	
2016	52nd Baeksang Arts Awards	Grand Prize (TV)	Descendants of the Sun	Won	
2016	52nd Baeksang Arts Awards	Best Drama	Descendants of the Sun	Nominated	
2016	52nd Baeksang Arts Awards	Best Director (TV)	Lee Eung-bok, Baek Sang-hoon	Nominated	
2016	52nd Baeksang Arts Awards	Best Actor (TV)	Song Joong-ki	Nominated	
2016	52nd Baeksang Arts Awards	Best Actress (TV)	Song Hye-kyo	Nominated	
2016	52nd Baeksang Arts Awards	Best Scriptwriter (TV)	Kim Eun-sook, Kim Won-seok	Nominated	
2016	52nd Baeksang Arts Awards	Most Popular Actor (TV)	Song Joong-ki	Won	
2016	52nd Baeksang Arts Awards	Most Popular Actor (TV)	Jin Goo	Nominated	
2016	52nd Baeksang Arts Awards	Most Popular Actress (TV)	Song Hye-kyo	Won	
2016	52nd Baeksang Arts Awards	Most Popular Actress (TV)	Kim Ji-won	Nominated	
2016	52nd Baeksang Arts Awards	iQIYI Global Star Award	Song Joong-ki	Won	
2016	52nd Baeksang Arts Awards	iQIYI Global Star Award	Song Hye-kyo	Won	
2016	52nd Baeksang Arts Awards	iQIYI Global Star Award	Jin Goo	Nominated	
2016	52nd Baeksang Arts Awards	iQIYI Global Star Award	Kim Ji-won	Nominated	
2016	2nd Scene Stealer Festival	Scene Stealer Award (Male)	Lee Seung-joon	Won	
2016	2nd Scene Stealer Festival	Scene Stealer Award (Male)	Jo Jae-yoon	Won	
2016	2nd Scene Stealer Festival	Newcomer Scene Stealer Award (Male)	Onew	Won	
2016	1st Indonesian Television Awards	Special Award	Jin Goo	Won	
2016	43rd Korean Broadcasting Grand Prize	Best Drama	Descendants of the Sun	Won	
2016	11th Seoul International Drama Awards	Excellent Korean Drama	Descendants of the Sun	Won	
2016	11th Seoul International Drama Awards	Outstanding Korean Actor	Song Joong-ki	Won	
2016	11th Seoul International Drama Awards	Outstanding Korean Drama OST	Gummy ("You Are My Everything")	Won	
2016	5th APAN Star Awards	Grand Prize	Song Joong-ki	Won	
2016	5th APAN Star Awards	Grand Prize	Song Hye-kyo	Nominated	
2016	5th APAN Star Awards	Drama of the Year	Descendants of the Sun	Won	
2016	5th APAN Star Awards	Top Excellence Award, Actor in a Miniseries	Song Joong-ki	Nominated	
2016	5th APAN Star Awards	Top Excellence Award, Actress in a Miniseries	Song Hye-kyo	Nominated	
2016	5th APAN Star Awards	Best Supporting Actor	Lee Seung-joon	Nominated	
2016	5th APAN Star Awards	Best Supporting Actor	Jin Goo	Won	
2016	5th APAN Star Awards	Best Supporting Actress	Kim Ji-won	Won	
2016	5th APAN Star Awards	Best New Actor	Kim Min-seok	Nominated	
2016	5th APAN Star Awards	Best APAN Star Award	Song Joong-ki	Won	
2016	5th APAN Star Awards	Best Couple Award	Song Joong-ki and Song Hye-kyo	Won	
2016	5th APAN Star Awards	Best Couple Award	Jin Goo and Kim Ji-won	Nominated	
2016	9th Korea Drama Awards	Grand Prize	Song Joong-ki	Nominated	
2016	9th Korea Drama Awards	Best Drama	Descendants of the Sun	Won	
2016	9th Korea Drama Awards	Best Drama Writer	Kim Eun-sook	Nominated	
2016	9th Korea Drama Awards	Excellence Award, Actor	Jo Jae-yoon	Won	
2016	9th Korea Drama Awards	Best New Actor	Kim Min-seok	Nominated	
2016	9th Korea Drama Awards	Best Original Soundtrack	Gummy ("You Are My Everything")	Nominated	
2016	Korea Advertisers Association Awards	Best Drama	Descendants of the Sun	Won	
2016	1st Asia Artist Awards	Grand Prize – Drama	Song Joong-ki	Nominated	
2016	1st Asia Artist Awards	Best Artist Award, Actress	Song Hye-kyo	Nominated	
2016	1st Asia Artist Awards	Best Celebrity Award, Actor	Jin Goo	Won	
2016	1st Asia Artist Awards	Best Celebrity Award, Actress	Kim Ji-won	Won	
2016	1st Asia Artist Awards	Best Rookie Award, Actress	Park Hwan-hee	Nominated	
2016	1st Asia Artist Awards	Best OST Award	Gummy ("You Are My Everything")	Won	
2016	1st Asia Artist Awards	Popularity Award, Actor	Song Joong-ki	Nominated	
2016	1st Asia Artist Awards	Popularity Award, Actress	Song Hye-kyo	Nominated	
2016	1st Asia Artist Awards	Popularity Award, Actress	Kim Ji-won	Nominated	
2016	8th Melon Music Awards	Best OST	Gummy ("You Are My Everything")	Nominated	
2016	8th Melon Music Awards	Best OST	Yoon Mi-rae ("Always")	Won	
2016	8th Melon Music Awards	Best OST	Davichi ("This Love")	Nominated	
2016	18th Mnet Asian Music Awards	Best OST	Davichi ("This Love")	Nominated	
2016	21st Asian Television Awards	Best Drama Series	Descendants of the Sun	Won	
2016	Korean Popular Culture and Arts Awards	Presidential Award	Song Joong-ki	Won	
2016	Korean Popular Culture and Arts Awards	Presidential Award	Song Hye-kyo	Won	
2016	Korean Popular Culture and Arts Awards	Presidential Award	Kim Eun-sook	Won	
2016	29th Grimae Awards	Grand Prize	Kim Si-hyung, Uhm Jun-sung (Cinematography)	Won	
2016	2016 KBS Drama Awards	Grand Prize	Song Joong-ki	Won	
2016	2016 KBS Drama Awards	Grand Prize	Song Hye-kyo	Won	
2016	2016 KBS Drama Awards	Top Excellence Award, Actor	Song Joong-ki	Nominated	
2016	2016 KBS Drama Awards	Top Excellence Award, Actress	Song Hye-kyo	Nominated	
2016	2016 KBS Drama Awards	Excellence Award, Actor in a Miniseries	Song Joong-ki	Nominated	
2016	2016 KBS Drama Awards	Excellence Award, Actor in a Miniseries	Jin Goo	Nominated	
2016	2016 KBS Drama Awards	Excellence Award, Actress in a Miniseries	Song Hye-kyo	Nominated	
2016	2016 KBS Drama Awards	Excellence Award, Actress in a Miniseries	Kim Ji-won	Won	
2016	2016 KBS Drama Awards	Best Supporting Actor	Jo Jae-yoon	Nominated	
2016	2016 KBS Drama Awards	Best Supporting Actress	Seo Jeong-yeon	Nominated	
2016	2016 KBS Drama Awards	Best New Actor	Kim Min-seok	Nominated	
2016	2016 KBS Drama Awards	Best New Actor	Onew	Nominated	
2016	2016 KBS Drama Awards	Best New Actress	Kim Ji-won	Won	
2016	2016 KBS Drama Awards	Best Screenwriter	Kim Eun-sook, Kim Won-seok	Won	
2016	2016 KBS Drama Awards	Netizen Award	Song Joong-ki	Nominated	
2016	2016 KBS Drama Awards	Netizen Award	Song Hye-kyo	Nominated	
2016	2016 KBS Drama Awards	Best Couple Award	Song Joong-ki and Song Hye-kyo	Won	
2016	2016 KBS Drama Awards	Best Couple Award	Jin Goo and Kim Ji-won	Won	
2016	2016 KBS Drama Awards	Best Asia Couple Award	Song Joong-ki and Song Hye-kyo	Won	
2017	31st Golden Disc Awards	Best OST	Gummy ("You Are My Everything")	Won	
2017	26th Seoul Music Awards	Best OST	Gummy ("You Are My Everything")	Won	
2017	29th Korea Producer Awards	Best Performer Award	Song Joong-ki	Won	
2017	Korea Communications Commission Broadcasting Awards	Grand Prize for Excellence in Production	Descendants of the Sun	Won	
2017	50th WorldFest-Houston International Film Festival	Special Jury Award (TV Series)	Descendants of the Sun	Won	

== Listicles ==
Name of publisher, year listed, name of listicle, recipient and placement
Publisher	Year	Listicle	Recipient	Placement	Ref.
Gallup Korea	2024	Best Television Couple of the Past 10 Years	Song Joong-ki and Song Hye-kyo	4th	
