= Man to Man (TV series) =

2017 South Korean TV series

- Promotional poster
- Also known as: Man x Man
- Genre: Action; Thriller; Melodrama; Comedy
- Written by: Kim Won-seok
- Directed by: Lee Chang-min
- Starring: Park Hae-jin; Park Sung-woong; Kim Min-jung; Chae Jung-an; Yeon Jung-hoon
- Composer: Park Se-joon
- Country of origin: South Korea
- Original language: Korean
- No. of episodes: 16

Production
- Executive producer: Ham Young-hoon
- Producers: Park Jun-seo; Hwang Ji-seon
- Production locations: Seoul, South Korea; Budapest, Hungary
- Editors: Park Soong-hee; Bae Young-joo; Kim Jin-seon
- Running time: 60 mins
- Production companies: Drama House (JTBC); Mountain Movement Story (Note: A subsidiary of Park Hae-jin's talent agency Mountain Movement (formerly WM Company))

Original release
- Network: JTBC
- Release: 21 April – 10 June 2017

Man to Man (Korean: 맨투맨) is a 2017 South Korean television series starring Park Hae-jin, Park Sung-woong, Kim Min-jung, Chae Jung-an, and Yeon Jung-hoon.

== Synopsis ==
A longtime celebrity Yeo Woon-gwang (Park Sung-woong) suddenly has a need for a bodyguard and hires Kim Seol-woo (Park Hae-jin), a handsome and mysterious man trained in special investigations who has many talents. In reality, Seol-woo is a NIS black ops agent who has his own agenda and the role of bodyguard is only a cover to achieve his goals. The drama is about the twisty events they encounter and the budding bromance between the star and bodyguard. In addition, Seol-woo gets romantically involved with Cha Do-ha (Kim Min-jung), the manager of Woon-gwang.

== Cast ==
=== Main ===
- Park Hae-jin as Kim Seol-woo

Main protagonist of the series. An elite black ops agent known only to the highest tiers of national intelligence. He never fails at a mission and keeps everything hidden behind a poker face. As he takes on a secret mission to protect a Hallyu star, he meets his greatest challenge.

- Park Sung-woong as Yeo Woon-gwang

A stuntman turned Hollywood action star, an actor beloved for being a bad guy onscreen. He hides a secret from his past. He hates Songsan. He deeply cares for Do-ha and considers her his sister.

- Kim Min-jung as Cha Do-ha

Female lead of the series. Head of Woon-gwang's fanclub who later gets a job at his management company as his manager. She meets both Seol-woo and Woon-gwang, and gets entangled with them.

- Chae Jung-an as Song Mi-eun

A former Miss Korea who is currently married to Seung-jae and the ex-girlfriend of Woon-gwang. After marriage, she has a son and lives the life of a devoted wife, but is wary of her husband.

- Yeon Jung-hoon as Mo Seung-jae

Primary antagonist of the series. A third-generation chaebol who lost his father very suddenly. His goal is to find the 3 wooden carvings and will stop at nothing to achieve this. He hides his vast ambition and though he managed to marry the woman he loves, he knows that she loves Woon-gwang and is determined to see his downfall.

=== Supporting ===
==== People around Cha Do-ha ====
- Kim Byung-se as Cha Myeong-seok

Do-ha's father. He has spent time in prison and his past is covered in a veil.

- Kim Bo-mi as Park Song-i

Do-ha's friend and flatmate.

==== People around Mo Seung-jae ====
- Kim Hyun-jin as Secretary Jang
- Jeon Kook-hwan as Ji Chang-wook

==== People around Song Mi-eun ====
- Lee Min-ho as Mo Jae-young, her and Seung-jae's son

==== NIS ====
- Jang Hyun-sung as Jang Tae-ho

A national intelligence agent and deputy director. Boss of Dong-hyun and Seol-woo.

- Kang Shin-il as Im Suk-hoon, NIS Director.
- Jung Man-sik as Lee Dong-hyun. Currently a public prosecutor but still conducts covert activities for NIS. Main contact of Seol-woo.
- Kim Jong-goo as Robert Yoon

==== Chewing Entertainment ====
- Lee Si-eon as Ji Se-hoon

CEO of Chewing Entertainment in which Woon-gwang belongs to.

- Oh Hee-joon as Yang Sang-sik, Woon-gwang's general manager.
- Han Ji-seon as Choi Seol-a, stylist
- Lee Ah-jin as Son Jung-hye, makeup artist

==== Baek Corporation ====
- Chun Ho-jin as Lawmaker Baek

A powerful politician in cahoots with Seung-jae and his family.

- Tae In-ho as Seo Ki-chul, a black ops agent and alpha team leader who goes head to head with Seol-woo.
- Moon Jae-won as Team leader Yong Jae-min
- Jo Seung-yeon as Choi Jae-hyuk

=== Others ===
- Oh Na-ra as Sharon Kim

Mi-eun's friend and owner of a luxury brand shop in which Woon-gwang is the face of.

- Shin Joo-a as Pi Eun-soo
- Kim Min-young as Woon-gwang's fan
- Jason Scott Nelson as Kim Seol-woo (voice)
- Lee Jun-hyeok as Director Lee Hyuk-joon
- ?? as Director Yoo Kyung-soo

=== Special appearances ===
- David Lee McInnis as Petrov, Russian officer that Seol-woo breaks out of prison
- Jeon Gook-hwan as Chairman Mo Byung-do, Seung-jae's grandfather (pictorial)
- Lee Do-yeop as PD Choi
- Choi Il-goo
- Jin Seon-kyu
- Im Ji-kyu
- Bbaek Ga
- Song Joong-ki as bankteller
- Namkoong Min
- Jung Dong-gyu as Attorney-General
- Son Jong-hak as Park Joon-won, Songsan Group's Finance Director
- Rátóti Zoltán as Maffia Boss
- Cha Bo-sung as Shop employee

== Original soundtrack ==
Man to Man OST

Soundtrack album
- Recorded: 2017
- Genre: Soundtrack
- Language: Korean
- Labels: JTBC Content Hub, Sony Music

=== Part 1 ===
No.	Title	Artist	Length
1.	"Take Your Hand"	VIXX	03:32
2.	"Take Your Hand" (Inst.)		03:32
Total length:			07:04

=== Part 2 ===
No.	Title	Artist	Length
1.	"Destiny" (운명처럼)	Park Boram, Basick	03:55
2.	"Destiny" (Inst.)		03:55
Total length:			07:50

=== Part 3 ===
No.	Title	Artist	Length
1.	"The Reasons" (너란 이유)	Huh Gak	04:05
2.	"The Reasons" (Inst.)		04:05
Total length:			08:10

=== Part 4 ===
No.	Title	Artist	Length
1.	"Full of Wonders" (신비로운 걸)	Vromance	03:06
2.	"Full of Wonders" (Inst.)		03:04
Total length:			06:10

=== Part 5 ===
No.	Title	Artist	Length
1.	"Open Your Mind" (마음아 열려라)	Mamamoo	03:45
2.	"Open Your Mind" (Inst.)		03:45
Total length:			07:30

=== Part 6 ===
No.	Title	Artist	Length
1.	"Aurora" (오로라)	Yangpa	03:41
2.	"Aurora" (Inst.)		03:41
Total length:			07:22

=== Part 7 ===
No.	Title	Artist	Length
1.	"Map of Heart" (마음의 지도)	Standing Egg	03:52
2.	"Map of Heart" (Inst.)		03:52
Total length:			07:44

=== Part 8 ===
No.	Title	Artist	Length
1.	"You"	Czaer feat. Far East Movement and Babylon	03:09
Total length:			03:09

=== Part 9 ===
No.	Title	Artist	Length
1.	"Temperature of Tears" (눈물의 온도)	Soul Latido	04:05
2.	"Temperature of Tears" (Inst.)		04:05
Total length:			08:10

== Production ==
- Man to Man was the first South Korea television series to be simulcast on television and Netflix.
- This project is helmed by PD Lee Chang-min, whose past works include Birth of a Beauty and Remember: War of the Son, which was Park Sung-woong's last drama. Two of the actors from the latter drama appeared: Lee Si-eon & Namkoong Min (as a cameo).
- The writer, Kim Won-seok, was the second writer on KBS's hit drama Descendants of the Sun. The first episode had a parody of one of the drama's famous scenes; and two of the actors also made cameo appearances: David Lee McInnis and Song Joong-ki.
- The action scenes for the drama are choreographed by The Man from Nowhere's chief stunt director, Park Jung-ryul.
- First script reading took place on October 3, 2016. Filming began on October 17, 2016 and ended on March 6, 2017, taking place in Seoul, South Korea and Budapest, Hungary.

== Ratings ==
In this table, the blue numbers represent the lowest ratings and the red numbers represent the highest ratings.

Ep.	Original broadcast date	Average audience share		
Ep.	Original broadcast date	AGB Nielsen		TNmS
Ep.	Original broadcast date	Nationwide	Seoul	Nationwide
1	April 21, 2017	4.055%	4.808%	3.6%
2	April 22, 2017	4.074%	4.535%	4.1%
3	April 28, 2017	2.527%	2.866%	2.4%
4	April 29, 2017	3.462%	3.835%	3.0%
5	May 5, 2017	3.229%	3.682%	2.4%
6	May 6, 2017	2.452%	2.379%	2.8%
7	May 12, 2017	3.289%	3.569%	3.7%
8	May 13, 2017	4.028%	4.612%	3.7%
9	May 19, 2017	2.988%	3.277%	2.5%
10	May 20, 2017	2.356%	2.240%	3.0%
11	May 26, 2017	2.828%	3.284%	2.9%
12	May 27, 2017	3.290%	3.722%	3.0%
13	June 2, 2017	2.498%	2.964%	2.5%
14	June 3, 2017	3.092%	3.511%	3.4%
15	June 9, 2017	2.601%	2.809%	2.8%
16	June 10, 2017	4.022%	4.436%	3.9%
Average		3.174%	3.533%	3.1%

- This drama airs on a cable channel/pay TV which normally has a relatively smaller audience compared to free-to-air TV/public broadcasters (KBS, SBS, MBC and EBS).
