= Mr. Sunshine (South Korean TV series) =

2018 South Korean television series

- Promotional poster
- Hangul: 미스터 션샤인
- RR: Miseuteo syeonsyain
- MR: Misŭt'ŏ syŏnsyain
- Genre: Historical; Romance; Melodrama
- Created by: Lee Myung-han (tvN); Netflix
- Developed by: Jinnie Choi; Studio Dragon
- Written by: Kim Eun-sook
- Directed by: Lee Eung-bok
- Starring: Lee Byung-hun; Kim Tae-ri; Yoo Yeon-seok; Kim Min-jung; Byun Yo-han
- Composer: Nam Hye-seung
- Country of origin: South Korea
- Original languages: Korean; English; Japanese
- No. of seasons: 1
- No. of episodes: 24

Production
- Executive producers: Kim Young-kyu; Yoon Ha-rim
- Camera setup: Single camera
- Production companies: Studio Dragon; Hwa&Dam Pictures
- Budget: ₩40 billion

Original release
- Network: tvN
- Release: July 7 – September 30, 2018

Mr. Sunshine (Korean: 미스터 션샤인) is a South Korean television series written by Kim Eun-sook and directed by Lee Eung-bok, starring Lee Byung-hun, Kim Tae-ri, Yoo Yeon-seok, Kim Min-jung, and Byun Yo-han. The series is set in Hanseong (present-day Seoul) in the early 1900s, and focuses on activists fighting for Korea's independence. It aired on tvN from July 7 to September 30, 2018, every Saturday and Sunday at 21:00 (KST), and premiered internationally on Netflix.

Upon its final broadcast, Mr. Sunshine was the third highest-rated series in Korean cable television history, with the last episode reaching 18.129%. Critically, it was acclaimed for its cinematography and storytelling, as well as its strong female characters and portrayal of the common people. At the 55th Baeksang Arts Awards, it received eight nominations and a Best Actor win for Lee Byung-hun.

== Synopsis ==
Mr. Sunshine centers on Eugene Choi, who was born into slavery in Joseon. After his father is beaten to death and his mother dies protecting him, young Eugene escapes to the United States at the time of the 1871 Shinmiyangyo incident with the help of a Christian missionary. He grows up in New York City and becomes a Marine Corps officer.

When he returns to Korea as a captain serving in the US legation in Hanseong, Eugene meets and falls in love with Go Ae-shin, a nobleman's granddaughter who is secretly a freedom fighter and a sniper for the Righteous Army. However, their love is challenged by their different classes and the presence of Kim Hui-seong, a nobleman from a prominent family who has been Ae-shin's betrothed since childhood.

Eugene also encounters Gu Dong-mae, a ruthless samurai, and Kudo Hina, the Joseon-born widow of a wealthy Japanese man and owner of the popular Glory Hotel.

As he discovers a plot by the Empire of Japan to colonize Korea, Eugene becomes embroiled in the fight for his birth country's sovereignty.

== Cast ==
=== Main ===
- Lee Byung-hun as Eugene Choi / Choi Yu-jin
  - Kim Kang-hoon as child Eugene Choi / Choi Yu-jin
  - Jeon Jin-seo as young Eugene Choi / Choi Yu-jin

A captain of the United States Marine Corps and former Joseon slave. After witnessing his parents' death at the hands of their owner, Eugene manages to escape to the United States where he becomes an officer in the Marine Corps and fights in the Spanish–American War. He later returns to Korea on a diplomatic mission and falls in love with Go Ae-shin. Eugene has to choose between helping Ae-shin in her fight for independence or maintaining his neutral position as a US officer.

- Kim Tae-ri as Go Ae-shin
  - Heo Jung-eun as child Go Ae-shin

An orphaned noblewoman and member of the Righteous Army. Her parents were independence fighters who died in Japan due to their colleague's betrayal. She is raised by her paternal grandfather who helps her train as a sniper.

- Yoo Yeon-seok as Gu Dong-mae / Ishida Shō
  - Choi Min-young as young Gu Dong-mae

The son of a butcher who flees to Japan upon his parents' death and becomes a member of the Musin Society, which is part of the Yakuza. He believes that it is the unjust Joseon social hierarchy that killed his parents and returns to Korea with a mission of helping the Japanese overtake the country.

- Kim Min-jung as Kudo Hina / Yi Yang-hwa

An influential widow who runs a hotel in Korea. Her father forced her to marry an old, rich Japanese man. Upon her husband's mysterious death, she inherited the Glory Hotel and successfully operates it on her own. In order to atone for her father's shameful misdeeds and to also find her mother, Hina helps the emperor in the fight against the Japanese government and the pro-Japanese officials.

- Byun Yo-han as Kim Hui-seong

A nobleman who is considered to be the richest after the emperor in terms of land ownership. He is emotionally tormented by his grandfather's past deeds and lives for over a decade in Japan to avoid marrying the woman his family chose for him.

=== Recurring ===
==== Korean government ====
- Lee Seung-joon as Emperor Gojong
  - Kang Yi-seok as young Emperor Gojong

The Korean monarch who desperately fights for the country's sovereignty.

- Kang Shin-il as Yi Jung-mun

An anti-Japanese official loyal to the emperor. He secretly commands the Righteous Army.

- Kim Eui-sung as Yi Wan-ik / Rinoie Hiroaki

Kudo Hina's father. A selfish and cruel pro-Japanese official who is responsible for the deaths of Go Ae-shin's parents.

- Kim Joong-hee as Yi Deok-mun

A pro-Japanese nobleman. Yi Wan-ik's assistant and Go Ae-sun's abusive husband.

- Choi Jin-ho as Yi Se-hun

The arrogant and corrupt Minister of Foreign Affairs whose actions indirectly led to the deaths of Eugene Choi's parents.

- Jung Hee-tae as Police Commissioner Jung
- Shin Mun-sung as Postmaster Yoon
- Kim Kang-il as Doctor Matsuyama

A Japanese doctor secretly working for Yi Wan-ik.

- Jung Seung-gil as Yi Wan-yong

An infamous pro-Japanese official and one of the Five Eulsa Traitors.

==== Righteous Army ====
- Kim Kap-soo as Hwang Eun-san

An accomplished potter who helps a young Eugene Choi flee to the United States. The leader of the Righteous Army.

- Lee Si-hoon as Yoshino Kō

A Japanese man working as an assistant for Hwang Eun-san.

- Choi Moo-sung as Jang Seung-gu
  - Sung Yoo-bin as young Jang Seung-gu

A gunman who trains Go Ae-shin to become a sniper. Due to a misunderstanding he initially despises the emperor, but eventually becomes the head of the palace guards to protect him.

- Seo Yoo-jung as Hong-pa

Jang Seung-gu's wife. A skilled archer and rower.

- Jang Dong-yoon as Jun-young

A young nobleman eager to fight for Korea's sovereignty.

- Oh Ah-yeon as So-ah

A Korean-born geisha who is part of the Righteous Army.

- Im Chul-soo as Jeon Seung-jae

A Righteous Army member and one of the close friends of Go Ae-shin's parents.

- Ji Seung-hyun as Song Yeong

A cousin of Go Ae-shin's mother. He served as an official at the time of the Shinmiyangyo incident and now lives in Japan supporting the Righteous Army.

- Lee Dong-yong as Yi Sang-mok

A jige carrier and Righteous Army member who is briefly captured by Gu Dong-mae.

- Lee Soon-won as Park Mu-geol

The bell keeper who is secretly a member of the Righteous Army.

- Lee Dong-hee as baker

A Righteous Army member and owner of a French bakery/candy store.

- Park Sung-hoon as blacksmith

A friend of Jang Seung-gu who is talented in fixing machinery.

==== Japanese government and army ====
- Kim In-woo as Itō Hirobumi

The first Resident-General of Korea.

- Jung In-kyum as Hayashi Gonsuke

The Minister and de facto leader of the Japanese legation.

- Kim Nam-hee as Mori Takashi

A Japanese colonel of noble blood. Sadistic and cruel, he has a heavy dislike for Korea. Eugene Choi was his neighbor in New York City.

- Gong Dae-yu as Sasaki Soyu

An arrogant Japanese major serving under Mori Takashi.

- Yoon Dae-yul as Hasegawa Yoshimichi

The Governor-General of Korea under Itō Hirobumi.

- Lee Jung-hyun as Second Sergeant Tsuda

A fanatically loyal Japanese NCO officer.

- Choi Kwang-je as Second Sergeant Yamada

A Japanese NCO officer.

- Song Jin-woo as Hyung-ki

A Korean man who works as a translator at the Japanese legation.

- Jeong Tae-ya as Suzuki

A man working at the Japanese legation who develops an enmity with Gu Dong-mae.

==== Go family's household ====
- Lee Ho-jae as Go Sa-hong

Go Ae-shin's paternal grandfather. He is a great scholar and the emperor's former teacher. A firm believer in the sovereignty of Korea, he very reluctantly allows his granddaughter to join the Righteous Army.

- Lee Jung-eun as Ms. Ham-an

Go Ae-shin's loyal maid.

- Shin Jung-geun as Mr. Haeng-rang

Go Ae-shin's manservant.

- Kim Na-woon as Lady Cho

Go Ae-shin's maternal figure and wife of her paternal uncle.

- Park Ah-in as Go Ae-sun

Go Ae-shin's cousin and Yi Deok-mun's wife. Unable to bear a son, she is regularly abused by her husband.

==== United States legation ====
- David Lee McInnis as Kyle Moore

A major in the US Marine Corps who is both the direct supervisor and friend of Eugene Choi.

- Jo Woo-jin as Im Gwan-su

An English interpreter working at the US legation. He later becomes an English translator for the emperor.

- Ko Woo-rim as Son Do-mi
  - Kim Min-jae as adult Son Do-mi

A young boy who works at the US legation, where he teaches hangul to Eugene Choi. Son Su-mi's younger brother.

- Lorne Edward Oliver as Horace Newton Allen

The corrupt US Minister who considers Eugene Choi more Korean than American.

==== Kim family ====
- Kim Eung-soo as Kim Pan-seo

Kim Hui-seong's grandfather. A cruel and extremely wealthy nobleman responsible for the deaths of Eugene Choi's parents.

- Kim Dong-gyun as Kim An-pyeong
  - Lee Hak-joo as young Kim An-pyeong

Kim Hui-seong's cowardly father.

- Kim Hye-eun as Yun Ho-sun
  - Park Ji-yeon as young Yun Ho-sun

Kim Hui-seong's mother.

- Jung Min-ah as Yeon-ju

Kim Hui-seong's wife and Jun-young's sister.

==== People around Gu Dong-mae ====
- Yoon Joo-man as Yuzo

Gu Dong-mae's loyal subordinate in the Musin Society.

- Kim Yong-ji as Hotaru

A mute Japanese fortune-teller living with Gu Dong-mae.

- Hakuryu as leader of the Musin Society

==== Glory Hotel employees ====
- Shin Soo-yeon as Son Su-mi

Son Do-mi's elder sister.

- Kim Si-eun as Gwi-dan

A maid at the Glory Hotel who is secretly working for Gu Dong-mae.

==== Others ====
- Yoon Byung-hee as Kim Yong-ju

A former friend of Go Ae-shin's parents who betrayed them to Yi Wan-ik.

- Kim Byung-chul as Il-sik

A slave hunter who diverted and became the co-owner of a shop that takes care of any need.

- Bae Jung-nam as Chun-sik

A slave hunter who diverted and became the co-owner of a shop that takes care of any need.

- Jason Nelson as Joseph W. Stenson

An American missionary. He helps Eugene Choi escape to the United States and is a paternal figure to him.

- Ariane Desgagnés-Leclerc as Stella

An American missionary working as an English teacher in Korea.

- Park Bo-mi as Yun Nam-jong

A student at Stella's English school who later becomes Kim Hui-seong's assistant.

=== Special appearances ===
- Lee Si-a as Eugene Choi's mother
- Jo Wan-ki as Eugene Choi's father
- Choi Jong-won as Grand Internal Prince Heungseon

The emperor's father.

- Yoon Kyung-ho as Jang Seung-gu's father

A gunner killed during the Shinmiyangyo incident.

- Im Se-mi as Gu Dong-mae's mother
- Shim Wan-joon as Gu Dong-mae's father
- Jin Goo as Go Sang-wan

Go Ae-sin's father who is killed while plotting to assassinate Yi Wan-ik.

- Kim Ji-won as Kim Hui-jin

Go Ae-shin's mother who is killed by Yi Wan-ik.

- Kim Joo-ryoung as Imperial Noble Consort Sunheon

The emperor's high-ranking concubine and Kudo Hina's close friend.

- Park Jeong-min as Ahn Chang-ho

A Korean independence activist living in the United States.

== Background ==
=== Historical background ===
Unlike most sageuk dramas dealing with the Japanese occupation of Korea, Mr. Sunshine takes place before the Japanese annexation, in the late 19th and early 20th centuries. It has a heavy focus on the Righteous Army and depicts the lives of people who fought for Korea's freedom. Real-life historical events such as the Shinmiyangyo incident, the Spanish-American War, the assassination of Empress Myeongseong, the Russo-Japanese War, Gojong's forced abdication and the Battle of Namdaemun are portrayed or mentioned.

Historical figures such as Emperor Gojong, Itō Hirobumi, Hayashi Gonsuke, Hasegawa Yoshimichi, Horace Newton Allen and the Five Eulsa Traitors appear as recurring characters, with others, such as Theodore Roosevelt, Ahn Chang-ho, Imperial Noble Consort Sunheon, Park Seung-hwan, and Frederick Arthur MacKenzie, also making cameo appearances.

=== Main historical events described in Mr. Sunshine ===
- The Battle of Ganghwa: A major battle that occurred on June 10, 1871 between the United States and Joseon. On June 1, American ships came under fire when they entered the Ganghwa Straits to establish trade and ensure the safety of the shipwrecked sailors of the SS General Sherman, which was destroyed by the Joseon army. As a result of Joseon's refusal to apologize, on June 10, USS Palos and USS Monocacy fired their weapons against the Choji Garrison on Ganghwa Island. The incident is thoroughly portrayed in Mr. Sunshine as one of its characters, Jang Seung-gu, fought in the battle as a teen and lost his father.
- The Japan–Korea Treaty of 1905: Signed on November 17, 1905, this treaty effectively gave diplomatic control over Korea to the Empire of Japan. While Mr. Sunshine does not depict the treaty and its effects in detail, it contains a scene in which Kim Hui-seong takes pictures of the Five Eulsa Traitors.
- The Battle of Namdaemun: Fought between the Korean and Japanese armies on August 1, 1907, the battle took place at the Namdae Gate in Hanseong. It was caused by a revolt of the Korean army after an order of disbandment was issued through the Japan–Korea Treaty of 1907. The battle scenes are extensively illustrated in Mr. Sunshine.

== Production ==
On May 29, 2017, it was announced that Kim Eun-sook had begun writing a new series with the working title Mr. Sunshine. A representative from Hwa&Dam Pictures stated at the time that it would be aired in the spring or summer of the following year. The drama is the third collaboration between Kim and director Lee Eung-bok, after Descendants of the Sun (2016) and Guardian: The Lonely and Great God (2016–2017). In June, Lee Byung-hun was officially cast as the male lead, in his first television role since Iris (2009), and Kim Tae-ri was announced as the female lead the following month. The drama marked film actress Kim Tae-ri's small-screen debut. Kim Sa-rang was originally cast in the series, but backed out in February 2018 due to scheduling conflicts. She was replaced by Kim Min-jung.

The drama was first pitched by Studio Dragon to SBS, but SBS passed on the project due to financial and advertising constraints. Filming began in September 2017 and took place in various parts of South Korea including Busan, Daegu, Gokseong County, Gyeongju and Hapcheon County. Several sets solely devoted to the early 1900s setting of Korea were built on a 20,000 m^{2} site in Nonsan, South Chungcheong Province, and another indoor set was built on a 6,600 m^{2} site in Daejeon. 1,000 extras were hired for a battle scene. To obtain the series' distribution rights in over 190 countries, Netflix invested ₩30 billion (US$26.2 million) in Mr. Sunshine.

== Episodes ==
No.	Title	Original release date
1	"Episode 1"	July 7, 2018
Joseon stands firm against US incursion. Yu-jin survives in the US — as Eugene. Ae-shin knows that great change is afoot with global ramifications.
2	"Episode 2"	July 8, 2018
Queen Min has been assassinated. For Ae-shin, words are useless against rapacious foreign powers so she'll take up arms instead. Eugene gets a new post.
3	"Episode 3"	July 14, 2018
In an age of imported coffee and fashions, Ae-shin prefers her German gun, but wonders what the English word "love" means and whether Eugene is a friend.
4	"Episode 4"	July 15, 2018
Suspicions run deep as US troops lose a gun on a train. Ae-shin shows Dong-mae compassion, Hui-seong returns to Korea and Eugene considers revenge.
5	"Episode 5"	July 21, 2018
Ae-shin meets Hui-seong for coffee at the hotel. Eugene deals with Japanese troops at the US legation and wants to know why Ae-shin defends Joseon.
6	"Episode 6"	July 22, 2018
Ae-shin gets a new mission. Eugene, Dong-mae and Hui-seong have something in common. Eugene delves into his past and finally gives Ae-shin his answer.
7	"Episode 7"	July 28, 2018
Ae-shin learns love's real meaning and crushes a thug. Emperor Gojong asserts Korea's authority. Eugene reveals his Korean name to Ae-shin.
8	"Episode 8"	July 29, 2018
Despite being advised to lay low as a noblewoman, Ae-shin undertakes a dangerous operation. Eugene makes a surprising move and Hui-seong probes his past.
9	"Episode 9"	August 4, 2018
Eugene wants to know why Ae-shin can't pull back, but her path is with the Righteous Army. Hui-seong disagrees with Ae-shin and offers an alternative.
10	"Episode 10"	August 5, 2018
Emperor Gojong seeks Eugene's aid. Ae-shin feels conflicted after hearing Eugene's story, but later sees him on a snowy night.
11	"Episode 11"	August 11, 2018
Ae-shin apologizes to Eugene, but he hopes that she'll keep fighting for her Joseon. Hui-seong takes a streetcar ride with Ae-shin and proposes a plan.
12	"Episode 12"	August 12, 2018
Re-affirming her commitment, Ae-shin stands by her decision and settles on an unforeseen pact over castella cake. Eugene investigates an old photograph.
13	"Episode 13"	August 18, 2018
Ae-shin and Eugene take a ride out to the sea. A nefarious traitor shows great interest in Hui-seong and Eugene. Lord Go meets with Hui-seong.
14	"Episode 14"	August 19, 2018
Eugene gets devastating news. Dong-mae is apprehended, Ae-shin asks Hina for help and Hui-seong comes to the rescue when Eugene finds himself cornered.
15	"Episode 15"	August 25, 2018
A disquieting sight vexes Emperor Gojong. Ae-shin defies Lord Go, Eugene refuses to forgive and Hui-seong visits the Go family's residence.
16	"Episode 16"	August 26, 2018
Hui-seong starts a newspaper and makes a personal sacrifice. Lord Go marshals support, Ae-shin imagines a different life and Eugene goes to the palace.
17	"Episode 17"	September 1, 2018
After giving up that which means the most to him, Hui-seong gets a friend for a gift. Lord Go leads an urgent appeal and Ae-shin faces Japanese troops.
18	"Episode 18"	September 2, 2018
Eugene contends with a viperous imperialist. Seeing Lord Go's incarceration, Hui-seong publishes a special edition. Ae-shin snubs a Japanese official.
19	"Episode 19"	September 8, 2018
Ae-shin loses a part of herself. Her grandfather counters mounting imperialist schemes, Hui-seong avenges Ae-shin and Emperor Gojong strikes down a snake.
20	"Episode 20"	September 9, 2018
The Righteous Army retaliates against the Japanese troops and Ae-shin seeks justice. War breaks out in Korea and Eugene gets orders to return to the US.
21	"Episode 21"	September 15, 2018
Called an American imperialist, Eugene later asks Ae-shin why she persists in a futile cause. Hui-seong helps Ae-shin out of a bind. An ally joins Ae-shin.
22	"Episode 22"	September 16, 2018
Emperor Gojong tries to shield the nation but is thrust into an impasse. Finding herself behind the eight ball, Ae-shin concedes that words have power.
23	"Episode 23"	September 29, 2018
Seeing the explosion, Hui-seong, Dong-mae and Eugene fear the worst. The world's indifference dismays Emperor Gojong, but Korea's defiance gets bolder.
24	"Episode 24"	September 30, 2018
Korea remains steadfast. The Righteous Army perseveres on its course. Ae-shin keeps her flame ablaze, while Hui-seong, Dong-mae and Eugene try to help.

== Original soundtrack ==
Mr. Sunshine OST

Soundtrack album by Various Artists
- Released: 2018
- Genre: Soundtrack
- Languages: Korean; English
- Labels: Stone Music Entertainment; Hwa&Dam Pictures; Glove Entertainment

The music was composed by Nam Hye-seung, who is known for her work on many Korean dramas. Mr. Sunshine's score was recorded at the newly opened Vienna Synchron Stage in Austria. Nam Hye-seung travelled to Vienna to attend the recording in person.

Original soundtrack (Part 1–15)

Part 1

Released on July 8, 2018
No.	Title	Lyrics	Music	Artists	Length
1.	"The Day" (그 날)	Park Hyo-shin; Kim Eana	Park Hyo-shin; Jeong Jae-il	Park Hyo-shin	4:52
Total length:					4:52

Part 2

Released on July 15, 2018
No.	Title	Lyrics	Music	Artists	Length
1.	"Sad March" (슬픈 행진)	Nam Hye-seung; JELLO ANN	Nam Hye-seung; Park Sang-hee	Elaine	5:25
Total length:					5:25

Part 3

Released on July 22, 2018
No.	Title	Lyrics	Music	Artists	Length
1.	"Days Without Tears" (눈물 아닌 날들)	Nam Hye-seung; Kim Hee-jin	Nam Hye-seung; Kim Hee-jin	Kim Yoon-ah	3:46
Total length:					3:46

Part 4

Released on July 29, 2018
No.	Title	Lyrics	Music	Artists	Length
1.	"Sori" (소리)	Nam Hye-seung; Park Jin-ho	Nam Hye-seung; Park Jin-ho	Lee Su-hyun (AKMU)	5:02
Total length:					5:02

Part 5

Released on August 5, 2018
No.	Title	Lyrics	Music	Artists	Length
1.	"Good Day" (좋은 날)	Nam Hye-seung; Park Jin-ho	Nam Hye-seung; Park Jin-ho; Jeong Dong-hwan	MeloMance	5:31
Total length:					5:31

Part 6

Released on August 6, 2018
No.	Title	Lyrics	Music	Artists	Length
1.	"My Home (Eugene's song)"	Nam Hye-seung; JELLO ANN	Nam Hye-seung; Park Sang-hee	Savina & Drones	4:20
Total length:					4:20

Part 7

Released on August 12, 2018
No.	Title	Lyrics	Music	Artists	Length
1.	"Becoming The Wind" (바람이 되어)	Athena	Athena; eNa	Ha Hyun-sang	4:43
Total length:					4:43

Part 8

Released on August 13, 2018
No.	Title	Lyrics	Music	Artists	Length
1.	"Stranger" (이방인)	Park Woo-sang	Park Woo-sang	Park Won	3:53
Total length:					3:53

Part 9

Released on August 19, 2018
No.	Title	Lyrics	Music	Artists	Length
1.	"Shine Your Star (Prod. by Zico)"	Safira.K; Zico	Zico; Poptime	o3ohn	3:35
Total length:					3:35

Part 10

Released on August 26, 2018
No.	Title	Lyrics	Music	Artists	Length
1.	"And I"	Tenzo; Kebee	Tenzo; LOOGONE	NU'EST W	3:55
Total length:					3:55

Part 11

Released on September 2, 2018
No.	Title	Lyrics	Music	Artists	Length
1.	"See You Again (feat. Richard Yongjae O'Neill)"	Ha Melli	POPKID; Safira.K	Baek Ji-young	3:48
Total length:					3:48

Part 12

Released on September 9, 2018
No.	Title	Lyrics	Music	Artists	Length
1.	"Beautiful As Fireworks" (불꽃처럼 아름답게)	Nam Hye-seng; Park Jin-ho	Nam Hye-seng; Park Jin-ho	Shin Seung-hun	4:30
Total length:					4:30

Part 13

Released on September 16, 2018
No.	Title	Lyrics	Music	Artists	Length
1.	"Paramour" (정인)	Hen	Hen	Sejeong (Gugudan)	3:54
Total length:					3:54

Part 14

Released on September 23, 2018
No.	Title	Lyrics	Music	Artists	Length
1.	"If You Were Me"	Son Go-eun (Monotree)	Son Go-eun (Monotree); NOPARI (Monotree)	Ben	4:25
Total length:					4:25

Part 15

Released on September 30, 2018
No.	Title	Lyrics	Music	Artists	Length
1.	"How Can I Forget You" (어찌 잊으오)	Nam Hye-seung; Park Jin-ho	Nam Hye-seung; Park Jin-ho	Hwang Chi-yeul	4:41
Total length:					4:41

OST Special Album

Disc 2:
No.	Title	Artists	Length
1.	"Mr. Sunshine (Opening title)"	Nam Hye-seung; Park Sang-hee	5:58
2.	"Wildflower"	Nam Hye-seung; Park Sang-hee	4:30
3.	"What Is Love?"	Nam Hye-seung; Park Sang-hee	2:36
4.	"Sad Waltz"	Nam Hye-seung; Park Sang-hee	3:20
5.	"With a Flame"	Nam Hye-seung; Park Sang-hee	3:25
6.	"A Side-By-Side Walk"	Nam Hye-seung; Park Sang-hee	3:07
7.	"The Era of Romance"	Nam Hye-seung; Park Sang-hee	4:53
8.	"Glory"	Nam Hye-seung; Park Sang-hee	5:07
9.	"Waiting"	Nam Hye-seung; Park Sang-hee	1:11
10.	"Greensleeves (Musicbox drama ver.)"	Nam Hye-seung; Park Sang-hee	2:35
11.	"No Tears (Piano ver.)"	Nam Hye-seung; Park Sang-hee	2:38
12.	"One More Step"	Nam Hye-seung; Park Sang-hee	4:19
13.	"Sad End"	Nam Hye-seung; Park Sang-hee	4:53
14.	"A Lady and Haman House"	Nam Hye-seung; Park Sang-hee	2:37
15.	"Black Bird"	Nam Hye-seung; Park Sang-hee	3:07

== Reception ==
Critics praised the drama for its "deep storytelling" and its ability to raise viewers' awareness of history. The Korea Times applauded the drama for shedding light on those deemed peripheral in society, such as women and the lower classes, and for successfully laying out contradictions and hope in the fast-evolving late Joseon period; it also praised the show's strong female characters. Time's Kat Moon chose the show as one of "The 10 Best Korean Dramas to Watch on Netflix" and argued, "Besides serving up stunning cinematography, the show introduces two of the most dynamic female leads from the K-drama world". Collider's Devon Forward listed it as one of "The Best Korean Dramas on Netflix Right Now". Major General Patrick Donaho, the commander of United States Forces Korea, strongly recommended the drama on his Twitter account in 2020.

=== Criticism ===
Mr. Sunshine has been criticized by some for what was perceived as an inaccurate portrayal of historical facts and Joseon's culture. It was also accused of being "pro-Japanese". In particular the character Gu Dong-mae, who had been portrayed as a member of the Black Dragon Society, a pro-Japanese organization, was condemned, with many feeling that the series tried to justify his actions against Joseon. However, the series has also been criticized for the exact opposite: enforcing stereotypes of the Japanese as villains and the Americans as heroes.

The production house responded to the criticisms by stating that the organizations and characters portrayed in the series are fictional and that they will modify the character description of Gu Dong-mae accordingly. The Black Dragon Society was changed to a fictional organization, the Musin Society.

== Viewership ==
At the time of airing, Mr. Sunshine recorded the third highest ratings in Korean cable television history with its final episode reaching 18.129% and netting an average rating of 12.955%, which was the highest average rating ever recorded for cable television until the release of The World of the Married in 2020.

An 8.9% viewership rating was recorded nationwide for the series' first episode. It became the highest premiere rating in the network's history and remained in this position for the next three years, when it was surpassed by Hospital Playlist 2.

The drama aired on a cable channel/pay TV which normally has a relatively smaller audience compared to free-to-air TV/public broadcasters (KBS, SBS, MBC and EBS).

Mr. Sunshine : South Korea viewers per episode (millions)

Season	Episode number																								Average
Season	1	2	3	4	5	6	7	8	9	10	11	12	13	14	15	16	17	18	19	20	21	22	23	24	Average
1	2.234	2.426	2.585	2.898	2.825	3.257	2.961	3.147	2.922	3.746	3.314	3.442	3.461	4.040	3.308	3.832	1.822	3.833	3.580	4.305	3.647	4.144	4.144	4.631	3.354

Source: Audience measurement performed nationwide by Nielsen Media Research.

Average TV viewership ratings
Ep.	Original broadcast date	Average audience share	
Ep.	Original broadcast date	AGB Nielsen	
Ep.	Original broadcast date	Nationwide	Seoul
1	July 7, 2018	8.852% (1st)	10.636% (1st)
2	July 8, 2018	9.691% (1st)	11.511% (1st)
3	July 14, 2018	10.082% (1st)	12.386% (1st)
4	July 15, 2018	10.567% (1st)	11.865% (1st)
5	July 21, 2018	10.835% (1st)	12.717% (1st)
6	July 22, 2018	11.713% (1st)	13.481% (1st)
7	July 28, 2018	11.114% (1st)	12.563% (1st)
8	July 29, 2018	12.330% (1st)	13.912% (1st)
9	August 4, 2018	11.695% (1st)	12.763% (1st)
10	August 5, 2018	13.534% (1st)	15.400% (1st)
11	August 11, 2018	12.792% (1st)	14.227% (1st)
12	August 12, 2018	13.399% (1st)	15.378% (1st)
13	August 18, 2018	13.327% (1st)	15.576% (1st)
14	August 19, 2018	15.626% (1st)	18.126% (1st)
15	August 25, 2018	12.893% (1st)	14.686% (1st)
16	August 26, 2018	15.023% (1st)	17.370% (1st)
17	September 1, 2018	7.694% (1st)	8.140% (1st)
18	September 2, 2018	14.722% (1st)	16.387% (1st)
19	September 8, 2018	14.114% (1st)	14.775% (1st)
20	September 9, 2018	16.500% (1st)	18.178% (1st)
21	September 15, 2018	14.280% (1st)	16.013% (1st)
22	September 16, 2018	16.588% (1st)	18.749% (1st)
23	September 29, 2018	15.419% (1st)	17.272% (1st)
24	September 30, 2018	18.129% (1st)	21.828% (1st)
Average		12.955%	14.747%
Special	September 22, 2018	8.937%	9.404%
In the table above, the blue numbers represent the lowest ratings and the red numbers represent the highest ratings.

== Accolades ==
Year	Award	Category	Recipient	Result	Ref.
2018	11th Korea Drama Awards	Grand Prize	Lee Byung-hun	Nominated	
2018	11th Korea Drama Awards	Best New Actress	Kim Tae-ri	Nominated	
2018	11th Korea Drama Awards	Best Original Soundtrack	"Days Without Tears" (Kim Yoon-ah)	Nominated	
2018	6th APAN Star Awards	Grand Prize	Lee Byung-hun	Won	
2018	6th APAN Star Awards	K-Star Award, Actor	Lee Byung-hun	Won	
2018	6th APAN Star Awards	Drama of the Year	Mr. Sunshine	Won	
2018	6th APAN Star Awards	Excellence Award, Actor in a Miniseries	Yoo Yeon-seok	Nominated	
2018	6th APAN Star Awards	Best Supporting Actress	Kim Min-jung	Won	
2018	6th APAN Star Awards	K-Star Award, Actress	Kim Min-jung	Nominated	
2018	6th APAN Star Awards	Best New Actress	Kim Tae-ri	Won	
2018	6th APAN Star Awards	K-Star Award, Actress	Kim Tae-ri	Won	
2018	3rd Asia Artist Awards	Grand Prize	Lee Byung-hun	Won	
2018	3rd Asia Artist Awards	Artist of the Year	Lee Byung-hun	Won	
2018	3rd Asia Artist Awards	Fabulous Award	Lee Byung-hun	Won	
2018	3rd Asia Artist Awards	Korean Tourism Appreciation Award	Lee Byung-hun	Won	
2018	3rd Asia Artist Awards	Artist of the Year	Yoo Yeon-seok	Won	
2018	3rd Asia Artist Awards	Best Actor Award	Yoo Yeon-seok	Won	
2018	3rd Asia Artist Awards	Best New Actress	Kim Tae-ri	Nominated	
2018	2nd The Seoul Awards	Best Actor	Lee Byung-hun	Won	
2018	2nd The Seoul Awards	Best Supporting Actor	Yoo Yeon-seok	Won	
2018	2nd The Seoul Awards	Best New Actress	Kim Tae-ri	Nominated	
2019	55th Baeksang Arts Awards	Best Drama	Mr. Sunshine	Nominated	
2019	55th Baeksang Arts Awards	Best Director	Lee Eung-bok	Nominated	
2019	55th Baeksang Arts Awards	Best Actor	Lee Byung-hun	Won	
2019	55th Baeksang Arts Awards	Best Actress	Kim Tae-ri	Nominated	
2019	55th Baeksang Arts Awards	Best Supporting Actor	Yoo Yeon-seok	Nominated	
2019	55th Baeksang Arts Awards	Best Supporting Actress	Kim Min-jung	Nominated	
2019	55th Baeksang Arts Awards	Best Screenplay	Kim Eun-sook	Nominated	
2019	55th Baeksang Arts Awards	Technical Award	Kim So-yeon (Art)	Nominated	
2019	55th Baeksang Arts Awards	Technical Award	Lee Yong-seob (Special effects)	Nominated	
2019	1st Asia Contents Awards & Global OTT Awards	Best Creative	Mr. Sunshine	Won	

=== Listicles ===
Name of publisher, year listed, name of listicle, recipient and placement
Publisher	Year	Listicle	Recipient	Placement	Ref.
Gallup Korea	2024	Best Television Couple of the Past 10 Years	Lee Byung-hun and Kim Tae-ri	5th	
