= Kim Won-seok (writer) =

South Korean screenwriter (born 1977)

- 김원석
- Born: September 7, 1977 (age 49); South Korea
- Education: Seoul National University
- Occupations: Film director; Screenwriter
- Years active: 1999-present
- Organization(s): Korea Television and Radio Writers Association (KTRWA)

Korean name
- Hangul: 김원석
- Hanja: 金元錫
- RR: Gim Wonseok
- MR: Kim Wŏnsŏk

Kim Won-seok (Korean: 김원석; born September 7, 1977) is a South Korean film director and scriptwriter. Starting his career in the directing department of the film Dr. K in 1999. Followed by assistant director for two Ryoo Seung-wan's film Die Bad and The City of Violence. In 2008, he made his debut as a writer with the script adaptation of the film Love is Beautiful. The following year, he co-wrote and co-directed the drama Friend, Our Legend with Kwak Kyung-taek. However, it was in 2013 that he truly established himself as a writer with the MBC drama The Queen's Classroom. After the success of The Queen's Classroom, Kim went on to co-write the immensely popular dramas Descendants of the Sun and Man to Man. His latest work is the screenplay for the drama Payback.

== Early life and education ==
Kim Won-seok was born September 7, 1977. He received his Bachelor of Arts from Seoul National University.

== Career ==
Kim Won-seok initially entered the entertainment industry as a director before transitioning to become a writer. He started as part of directing department of the film Dr. K in 1999. Followed by assistant director for two Ryoo Seung-wan's film Die Bad and The City of Violence. In 2008, he made his debut as a writer with the script adaptation of the film Love is Beautiful.

In 2009, Kim co-wrote and co-directed Kwak Kyung-taek's drama Friend, Our Legend. It is a remake / TV adaptation of Kwak Kyung-taek's own 2001 box-office hit film Friend.

In 2013, Kim made his debut as a television writer with the MBC drama The Queen's Classroom, which was an adaptation of a Japanese drama with the same name. It revolves around Ma Yeo-jin (played by Go Hyun-jung), a stern teacher who becomes the homeroom teacher of an elementary school class. The drama gained attention for its distinctive storyline, which places the children in difficult situations, forcing them to confront reality. It portrays the children's journey of personal growth and self-discovery as they navigate through a harsh teaching method that involves harsh words and extreme circumstances. Even after Ma Yeo-jin's departure, the students continue to reflect on her teachings and apply them, solidifying her status as a guiding hero for the children.

Kim Won-seok collaborated with writer Kim Eun-sook on the 2016 KBS2 drama Descendants of the Sun, which was based on Kim Won-seok's award-winning work Doctors Without Borders. The drama, set in an unfamiliar and challenging environment, depicted the struggles of young soldiers and doctors. While the romantic relationships in the series were captivating, the story also emphasized the sense of duty displayed by the main characters, portraying them as genuine heroes. Descendants of the Sun became a sensation in South Korea and China, attracting a wide audience due to its compelling storyline and exploration of life's value.

A year later, Kim returned with his new drama Man to Man, which made history as the first South Korean television series to be simulcast on both television and Netflix. Man to Man tells the story of a mysterious agent who becomes a bodyguard for a famous Korean star and deals with secretive people around him. The drama presents the thrilling adventures of these secret agents in different exciting ways. The action scenes in the show are choreographed by Park Jung-ryul, who is well known for his work on the movie The Man from Nowhere. The project is led by director Lee Chang-min. First script reading took place on October 3, 2016. Filming began on October 17, 2016, and ended on March 6, 2017, taking place in Seoul, South Korea and Budapest, Hungary.

Notably, the first episode featured a parody of a famous scene from Descendants of the Sun', and two actors from the drama, David Lee McInnis and Song Joong-ki, made cameo appearances. Director Kwak Kyung-taek also made cameo appearance. Director Lee Chang-min, known for shows like Birth of a Beauty and Remember: War of the Son, had actors Lee Si-eon and Namkoong Min, who respectively acted in those dramas, make cameos in Man to Man as well.

Kim took a hiatus for several years before returning in 2023 with Payback, a revenge drama that revolves around the characters Eun-yong (played by Lee Sun-kyun), a skilled financial merchant, and Jun-kyung (Moon Chae-won), a legal expert. Together, they confront a formidable cartel. The drama has achieved a noteworthy viewership rating of approximately 10%.

== Filmography ==
=== Film ===
Directing and scriptwriting credits for film
Year	Title		Director	Credited as		Ref.
Year	English	Korean	Director	Directing Staff	Screenwriter	Ref.
1999	Dr. K	닥터 K	Kwak Kyung-taek	Directing department staff	—N/a	
2000	Die Bad	죽거나 혹은 나쁘거나	Ryoo Seung-wan	Assistant director	Ryoo Seung-wan	
2006	The City of Violence	짝패	Ryoo Seung-wan	Assistant director	Ryoo Seung-wan	
2008	Love is Beautiful	대한이, 민국씨	Choi Jin-won	—N/a	Adaptation team (Note: Under team led by Choi Jin-won)	

=== Television series ===
Directing and scriptwriting credits for television series
Year	Title		Network	Credited as			Ref.
Year	English	Korean	Network	Original author	Scriptwriter	Director	Ref.
2009	Friend, Our Legend	친구, 우리들의 전설	MBC	Kwak Kyung-taek	Co-author (Note: Co-author with Kwak Kyung-taek)	Co-directed (Note: Co-directed with Kwak Kyung-taek)	
2013	The Queen's Classroom	여왕의 교실	MBC	Kazuhiko Yukawa	Kim Won-seok	Lee Dong-yoon	
2016	Descendants of the Sun	태양의 후예	KBS2	Kim Won-seok	Co-author (Note: Co-authored together by Kim Eun-sook and Kim Won-seok, every award and nomination is shared)	Lee Eung-bok; Baek Sang-hoon	
2017	Man to Man	맨투맨	JTBC	—N/a	Kim Won-seok	Lee Chang-min	
2023	Payback	법쩐	SBS	—N/a	Kim Won-seok	Lee Won-tae	

== Accolades ==
=== Awards and nominations ===
Name of the award ceremony, year presented, category, nominee of the award, and the result of the nomination
Award ceremony	Year	Category	Nominee / Work	Result	Ref.
52nd Baeksang Arts Awards	2016	Grand Prize (TV)	Descendants of the Sun	Won	
52nd Baeksang Arts Awards	2016	Best Drama	Descendants of the Sun	Nominated	
52nd Baeksang Arts Awards	2016	Best Scriptwriter (TV)	Descendants of the Sun	Nominated	
43rd Korean Broadcasting Grand Prize	2016	Best Drama	Descendants of the Sun	Won	
11th Seoul International Drama Awards	2016	Excellent Korean Drama	Descendants of the Sun	Won	
5th APAN Star Awards	2016	Drama of the Year	Descendants of the Sun	Won	
9th Korea Drama Awards	2016	Best Drama	Descendants of the Sun	Won	
9th Korea Drama Awards	2016	Best Drama Writer	Descendants of the Sun	Nominated	
Korean Advertisers Association Awards	2016	Best Drama	Descendants of the Sun	Won	
21st Asian Television Awards	2016	Best Drama Series	Descendants of the Sun	Won	
30th KBS Drama Awards	2016	Best Screenwriter	Descendants of the Sun	Won	
Korea Communications Commission Broadcasting Awards	2017	Grand Prize for Excellence in Production	Descendants of the Sun	Won	
50th WorldFest-Houston International Film Festival	2017	Special Jury Award (TV series)	Descendants of the Sun	Won	

=== State honors ===
Name of country, year given, and name of honor
Country	Award Ceremony	Year	Honor	Ref.
South Korea	Korean Content Story Awards (Note: Honors are awarded at the 'Korea Content Awards - Story Category', which was established under the name of the 'Korea Story Contest' in 2009. It is the largest government contest in Korea that focuses on the story sector and aims to discover excellent original content and promising writers. The Ministry of Culture, Sports and Tourism and the Korea Creative Content Agency select 15 award-winning stories through the main and final screening process, which follows the preliminary screening. The selected stories are then awarded the Grand Prize (1 point from the President's Award), the Grand Prize (4 points from the Minister of Culture, Sports and Tourism), and the Excellence Award (10 points from the Korea Creative Content Agency Director's Award).)	2011	Korea Creative Content Agency's Director Excellence Award for Doctors Without Borders	
South Korea	Korean Content Story Awards	2023	Minister of Culture, Sports and Tourism Award; 15th Korean Content Story Awards for Doctors Without Borders, the original work of the drama Descendants of the Sun	
