= Friend, Our Legend =

2009 South Korean television series

- Promotional poster
- Also known as: Friend, Our Story
- Genre: Gangster; Friendship; Drama; Romance
- Created by: Kwak Kyung-taek
- Based on: Friend by Kwak Kyung-taek
- Developed by: Lee Jae-dong
- Written by: Kwak Kyung-taek; Han Seung-woon; Kim Won-seok
- Directed by: Kwak Kyung-taek; Kim Won-seok
- Starring: Hyun Bin; Kim Min-jun; Seo Do-young; Lee Si-eon; Wang Ji-hye; Jeong Yu-mi
- Composers: Brave; Kim Jun-seok
- Country of origin: South Korea
- Original language: Korean
- No. of episodes: 20

Production
- Executive producer: Lee Chang-jun
- Producer: Park Young-jin
- Production location: Busan
- Cinematography: Hwang Gi-seok; Gi Se-hun
- Editor: Park Gwang-il
- Running time: 60 minutes
- Production companies: Zininsa Film; CJ Entertainment

Original release
- Network: Munhwa Broadcasting Corporation
- Release: June 27 – August 30, 2009

Related
- Friend

Friend, Our Legend (Korean: 친구, 우리들의 전설; RR: Chingu, urideurui jeonseol) is a 2009 South Korean television series starring Hyun Bin, Kim Min-jun, Seo Do-young, Lee Si-eon and Wang Ji-hye. It aired on MBC from June 27 to August 30, 2009 on Saturdays and Sundays at 22:40 (KST) for 20 episodes.

It is a remake / TV adaptation of Kwak Kyung-taek's own 2001 box-office hit film Friend. Partnering up with another director and two scriptwriters, Kwak returned to the classic tale of male bonding, adding "more meat", in his words, to the original plot by writing a new character and more in-depth exploration of certain characters' lives, including their romances. Like the original film, the series was shot entirely in Busan. To maintain quality, it was 100% pre-produced before airing, a rarity among Korean dramas.

== Synopsis ==
Based on the 2001 film, Friend, Our Legend expands and retells Kwak Kyung-taek's semi-autobiographical rough-and-tumble tale about four childhood friends coming of age in the tough streets of Busan in the 1970s and 1980s. As they enter into manhood, best friends Dong-soo (Hyun Bin) and Joon-seok (Kim Min-jun) become enemies and bitter rivals in the city's underworld of gangs.

== Cast ==
=== Main ===
- Hyun Bin as Han Dong-soo
- Kim Min-jun as Lee Joon-seok
- Seo Do-young as Jung Sang-taek
- Lee Si-eon as Kim Joong-ho
- Wang Ji-hye^{1} as Choi Jin-sook
  - Moon Ga-young as young Jin-sook
- Bae Geu-rin as Park Sung-ae
- Jeong Yu-mi as Min Eun-ji

=== Supporting ===
- Jung Hye-sung as Sae-ri
- Oh Min-ae as Jin-sook's mother
- Kim Dong-hyun as Joon-seok's father
- Lee Jae-yong as Sang-gon, gangster boss
- Cha Do-jin^{2} as "Doruko"
- Choo Min-ki as Joong-ki
- Kim Rok-kyung as "Kangaroo"
- Kim Ri-na as Do-yeon
- Kwon Jae-hyun as umbrella man
- Seo Gil-ja as loan shark
- Kim Jong-soo as Dong-soo's father
- Kim Yoon-sung as "Hyena"
- Noh Jun-ho
- Joo Ah
- Go In-beom
- Lee Sol-gu as Seom Pyo-joo
- Kwak Min-suk

== Ratings ==
Ep.	Original broadcast date	Average audience share			
Ep.	Original broadcast date	Nielsen Korea		TNmS	
Ep.	Original broadcast date	Nationwide	Seoul	Nationwide	Seoul
1	June 27, 2009	8.6%	8.4%	9.0%	8.6%
2	June 28, 2009	8.1%	8.9%	8.4%	9.2%
3	July 4, 2009	8.9%	9.0%	9.8%	10.5%
4	July 5, 2009	7.6%	8.3%	8.2%	8.9%
5	July 11, 2009	8.2%	8.3%	9.8%	9.9%
6	July 12, 2009	6.6%	6.7%	7.9%	8.0%
7	July 18, 2009	7.6%	7.9%	9.0%	9.3%
8	July 19, 2009	6.0%	6.3%	6.8%	7.1%
9	July 25, 2009	7.7%	8.2%	8.1%	8.6%
10	July 26, 2009	5.4%	6.0%	6.0%	6.6%
11	August 1, 2009	6.9%	7.8%	8.0%	8.9%
12	August 2, 2009	8.0%	8.5%	7.0%	7.5%
13	August 8, 2009	5.1%	5.6%	4.3%	4.8%
14	August 9, 2009	4.3%	5.1%	5.2%	6.0%
15	August 15, 2009	5.8%	6.8%	7.5%	8.5%
16	August 16, 2009	6.6%	7.1%	7.9%	8.4%
17	August 22, 2009	6.8%	7.5%	7.6%	8.3%
18	August 23, 2009	6.0%	6.1%	8.2%	8.3%
19	August 29, 2009	5.6%	6.5%	7.9%	8.8%
20	August 30, 2009	5.6%	6.4%	7.2%	8.0%
Average		6.8%	7.3%	7.7%	8.2%
In the table above, the blue numbers represent the lowest ratings and the red numbers represent the highest ratings.

== Notes ==
- ^{1}Credited as Min Ji-hye.
- ^{2}Credited as Im Sung-kyu.
