= David Lee McInnis =

American actor

- Born: David Lee McInnis; December 12, 1973 (age 52); Green Bay, Wisconsin, U.S.
- Occupations: Actor; producer
- Years active: 1999–present
- Agent: Saram Entertainment
- Height: 1.88 m (6 ft 2 in)

David Lee McInnis (born December 12, 1973) is an American actor based in Seoul. He has worked in South Korea since 1999.

== Early life ==
McInnis is the only child of an American father of German and Irish descent and Korean mother who is a native of Jinju, South Gyeongsang Province, Thomas and Diana McInnis (née Lee Suk-hyang; 이숙향). Thomas served in the US Army in Korea, and David was born in Green Bay, Wisconsin and grew up in Antigo, Wisconsin and Honolulu, Hawaii. He is of German, Irish, and Korean heritage.

== Career ==
McInnis debuted as an actor in the 1999 American indie crime thriller The Cut Runs Deep, which was an underground hit in South Korea, where McInnis moved to soon after quitting school, and achieved noticeable success in the Asian film industry. He was the face of SK Telecom's UTO division from 2001 to 2003 while in Korea, and his early Asian film credits include a supporting cast role in A Moment to Remember.

After a period of introspection, McInnis returned to the limelight with a leading role in Typhoon, a big-budget South Korean action film released in 2005. McInnis went on to star in the critically-acclaimed American-Korean romance film Never Forever, then took on a supporting role in Epitaph, and guest-starred in MBC's television series Air City.

McInnis set up a spice business, McInnis MasterBlend, in 2006 with his father.

On April 21, 2016, McInnis appeared on SM STATION's music video with Lee Joo Young entitled "Pain Poem". It was sung by Kim Bum Soo and produced by KENZIE. He also acted in the famous Korean drama Descendants of the Sun (2016) as David Argus.

In March 2018, McInnis signed with the management agency Saram Entertainment.

== Filmography ==
=== Film ===
Year	Title	Role	Notes
1998	The Cut Runs Deep	J.D.	
2004	A Moment to Remember	Fashion Model	Cameo
2005	Typhoon	Somchai	
2007	Never Forever	Andrew Lee	
2007	Epitaph	Onji Koshiro	
2008	The Mikado Project	Jace Kanzaki	
2012	Escape from Tibet	Tashi	
2013	Who Killed Johnny	Max 2	
2013	The Last Stand		
2015	Seoul Searching	Sergeant Gallagher	
2019	The Rookies (2019 film)	Iron Fist	Chinese Film Debut and Lead Antagonist role
2020	Mr. Zoo: The Missing VIP	Dmitry	
2020	Samjin Company English Class	Billy Park	

=== Television ===
Year	Title	Role	Notes/Ref.
2007	Air City	Charlie	3 episodes
2011	Hawaii Five-0	Ken Nakoa	2 episodes
2013	Iris II: New Generation	Iris Agent Ray	
2013	Gu Family Book	Kageshima	13 episodes
2016	Descendants of the Sun	Captain David Argus	8 episodes
2017	Lies and Love		Upcoming
2017	Man to Man	Agent P	
2018	Mr. Sunshine	Major Kyle Moore	
2019	Kill It	Pavel	

=== Web ===
Year	Title	Role	Notes
2013	Mortal Kombat: Legacy	Lord Raiden	3 episodes

=== Music video appearances ===
Year	Song title	Artist	Notes
2001	"Catherine's Wheel"	Rialto	With Lee Na-young

=== Variety shows ===
Year	Title
2016	Running Man (Episode 297)
2016	Law of the Jungle (Episodes 225–228)
2018	My Little Old Boy (Episodes 115)
