= Lee Eung-bok =

South Korean television director (born 1972)

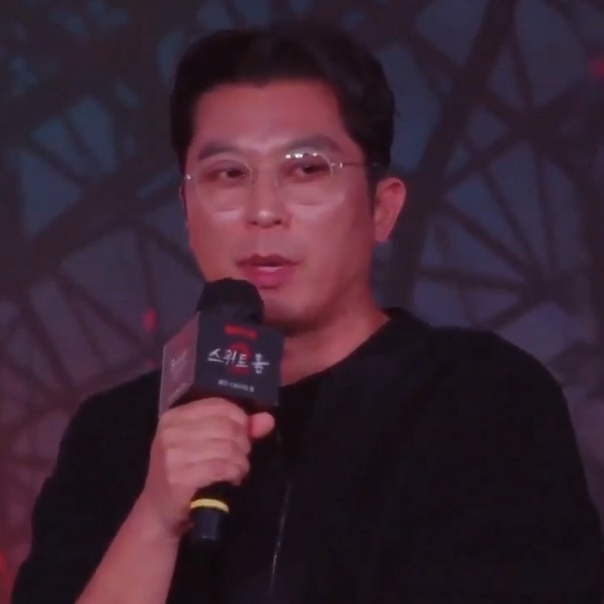
- Lee in 2025
- Born: 1972 (age 53–54); South Korea
- Education: Yonsei University
- Occupation: Director
- Years active: 2002–present
- Employers: KBS (2002–2016); CJ ENM (2016–2017); Studio Dragon (2017–present)

Korean name
- Hangul: 이응복
- RR: I Eungbok
- MR: I Ŭngbok

Lee Eung-bok (Korean: 이응복; born 1972) is a South Korean television director. His first work was Hometown of Legends – Forbidden Books for the KBS in 2009. He is also known for directing other popular shows such as School 2013 (2012), Secret Love (2013), and Descendants of the Sun (2016). After joining Studio Dragon, he continued his director career with works like Guardian: The Lonely and Great God (2016–17) and Mr. Sunshine (2018). In 2020, Lee directed his first Netflix original series, Sweet Home, which is based on the Naver webtoon of the same name by Kim Carnby and Hwang Young-chan. The series received positive reception, and a second season was released in 2023.

== Career ==
=== Beginning in KBS Drama Department ===
Lee started his television career in 2001 after passing the 28th PD Public Recruitment at KBS, where he began working in the Drama Department. The following year, he contributed a chapter titled "Broadcasting company recruitment trends and industry trends in the broadcasting industry" to the book PD Who and How (2002), an introductory guide to the PD profession jointly written by 27 PDs from the three major broadcasting companies and an outsourced production company.

=== Directorial debut ===
In 2009, Lee made his debut as director with the KBS2 Monday-Tuesday drama Hometown of Legends - Forbidden Books, written by Bang Ji-young. The story centers on a cursed banned book that summons ghosts, depicting the extreme maternal love of Hyeon-deok (played by Kim Seong-eun) to save her son who read the book, and the secrets of Jeong-hee (played by Yoon Hee-seok) involved in the book's creation. The following year, Lee co-directed The Reputable Family (Myeongga) with Jeon Woo-seong, a historical drama written by Baek Young-sook and Yoon Young-soo. It was the first KBS historical drama to be restored from KBS2 to KBS1 and marked Cha In-pyo's debut in the genre. The drama focused on the true value of wealth by introducing the anecdote of Gyeongju's richest family, which practiced the spirit of noblesse oblige. In the same year, Lee also directed the KBS 2TV Drama Special Episode 7 titled The Great Gye Chun-bin, a romantic comedy melodrama co-written with Yoon Ji-hee, starring Jung Yu-mi and Jung Kyung-ho in his first one-act play since joining KBS in 2003.

=== Career breakthrough with youth drama ===
Lee's subsequent project was the musical drama Dream High, which aired in 2011. The series was the result of a joint venture established in January 2009 between Bae Yong-joon's agency KeyEast and Park Jin-young's JYP Entertainment, named Holym, with CJ Media joining the production in April 2010. Bae served as the creative producer, while Park handled the music and choreography. In the end of 2010, it was announced that the screenplay was written by Park Hye-ryun, and Lee co-directed the series with Kim Seong-yoon.Dream High featured a main cast of prominent K-pop idols, including Ok Taec-yeon and Jang Wooyoung (2PM), Bae Suzy (Miss A), Hahm Eun-jung (T-ara), and IU, alongside non-idol actor Kim Soo-hyun, who trained at JYP Entertainment for three months for his role. Both Bae Yong-joon and Park Jin-young also appeared in the drama; Bae in a four-episode guest role—marking his return to television after three years—and Park in his acting debut.

In 2012, Lee co-directed School 2013, the fifth installment of KBS's School series, alongside Lee Min-hong. The drama, written by Lee Hyun-joo and Go Jung-won, was well-received by young viewers, garnering double-digit viewership ratings and contributing to the recognition of cast members such as Kim Woo-bin and Lee Jong-suk both domestically and overseas.

=== Continued success ===
While still directing School 2013 in October 2012, Lee began preparing for his next project, the drama Secret Love. Lee was highly impressed by the script, which had won the KBS Miniseries Script Contest for writer Choi Ho-cheol in 2012, and spent nearly a year in preparation and meetings with Choi. Chief Producer Hwang Ui-kyung subsequently recommended writer Yoo Bo-ra to join the project. The writing was divided, with Yoo Bo-ra developing the emotional and feminine aspects, and Choi Ho-cheol focusing on the mystery and thriller elements.Starring Hwang Jung-eum, Ji Sung, Bae Soo-bin, and Lee Da-hee, the 16-episode series aired on KBS2 from September 25 to November 14, 2013. Secret Love received consistent positive reviews for its well-structured plot of revenge and desire, becoming the top Wednesday-Thursday drama with a peak viewership rating of 16%, successfully competing against Kim Eun-sook's The Heirs. The success of the drama was noted by Chief Producer Hwang Eui-kyung as significant, showcasing the positive outcome of taking a risk on promising new writers for a mini-series.

In 2015, Lee took on the role of director for Descendants of the Sun, which employed a full pre-production format, a departure from the typical Korean live-shoot schedule, partly to meet China's government drama preliminary review requirements. Lee was reportedly drawn to the story as he sought solace following the Sewol Ferry disaster. The drama was adapted from Kim Won-seok's award-winning script "Doctors Without Borders", with Kim Eun-sook joined. as co-writer. It featured a star-studded cast including Song Joong-ki, Song Hye-kyo, Jin Goo, and Kim Ji-won.

Due to the scope of the project, including overseas filming, Lee enlisted directors Kang Myeong-chan and Kim Dong-sik for assistance, the latter having experience as a coordinator during the Korean filming of the movie Avengers. On September 28, 2015, the entire cast and crew, including the four main leads and supporting actors Kang Shin-il and Onew, embarked on a trip to Greece. It was reported that the majority of the filming took place in Zakynthos, Arachova, Lemnos, and Navagio. Filming locations for the fictional war-torn region set in a remote part of the Balkan Peninsula to avoid diplomatic issues with Iraq. While in South Korea, the Mowuru Company base camp was situated at the depleted Taebaek Hanbo Coal Mine, and earthquake scenes were filmed at the Samtan Art Mine. Other locations included the Camp Greaves DMZ Experience Centre, which was formerly a US Army base camp during the Korean War and Seoul St. Mary's Hospital for the Haesung Hospital scenes.

The 16-episode series aired on KBS2 from February 24 to April 14, 2016, and was followed by three special episodes from April 20 to 22, 2016. These special episodes featured highlights and memorable scenes from the series, provided insights into the drama's production process, featured behind-the-scenes footage, included commentaries from the cast members, and concluded with a final epilogue. The drama was a major success in South Korea, achieving a peak audience share of 38.8% and winning multiple awards, including the prestigious Grand Prize in television at the 52nd Baeksang Arts Awards. It was also recognized as the Most Popular Show of the year by the Korea Broadcasting Advertising Corporation. In March 2017, at the 29th Korea PD Awards, it received the Best TV Drama Award.

=== Moving to CJENM ===
Lee departed from KBS in August 2016 and subsequently joined CJ ENM Entertainment Division (later Studio Dragon). His first project after the move was a reunion with writer Kim Eun-sook for tvN's Friday-Saturday drama Guardian: The Lonely and Great God. The series revolves around the tale of a goblin and a girl who has the ability to see ghosts. The drama surpassed the 10% viewership mark within just two episodes. It commenced with a rating of 6.9% and increased to 8.3% in the second episode.

Two years later, Lee continued his successful collaboration with Kim Eun-sook with the historical drama Mr. Sunshine (2018).

== Filmography ==
=== Television series ===
Television drama credits
Year	Title		Credited as		Ref.
Year	English	Korean	Co-director	Director	Ref.
2009	Hometown of Legend - Forbidden Book	전설의 고향 - 금서	—N/a	Yes	
2010	The Reputable Family	명가	Co-director with Jeon Woo-sung	—N/a	
2010	KBS Drama Special - The Great Gye Chun-bin	KBS 드라마 스페셜 - 위대한 계춘빈	—N/a	Yes	
2011	Dream High	드림하이	Co-director (Note: Co-direct with Kim Seong-yoon)	—N/a	
2012	Dream High 2	드림하이 2	Co-director with Mo Wan-il	—N/a	
2012	KBS Drama Special - Glass Prison	KBS 드라마 스페셜 - 유리감옥	—N/a	Yes	
2012	School 2013	학교 2013	Co-director with Lee Min-hong	—N/a	
2013	KBS Drama Special - My Friend Is Still Alive	내 친구는 아직 살아있다	—N/a	Yes	
2013	Secret Love	비밀	—N/a	Co-director (Note: Co-direct with Baek Sang-hoon)	
2014	KBS Drama Special - Dreaming Man	KBS 드라마 스페셜 - 꿈꾸는 남자	—N/a	Yes	
2014	Discovery of Love	연애의 발견	Co-director	—N/a	
2014	KBS Drama Special - Cry Differently	KBS 드라마 스페셜 - 다르게 운다	—N/a	Yes	
2016	Descendants of the Sun	태양의 후예	Co-director	—N/a	
2016–2017	Guardian: The Lonely and Great God	쓸쓸하고 찬란하神 – 도깨비	Co-director (Note: Co-direct: Lee Eung-bok (Ep. 1–16); Kwon Hyuk-chan (Ep. 5–16); Yoon Jong-ho (Ep. 3–16))	—N/a	
2018	Mr. Sunshine	미스터 션샤인	—N/a	Yes	
2020–2023	Sweet Home	스위트홈	Co-director (Note: Co-direct: Lee Eung-bok; Jang Young-woo (season 1); Park So-hyun)	—N/a	
2021	Jirisan	지리산	—N/a	Yes	
TBA	I'm also against my relationship	나도 반대하는 나의 연애	—N/a	Yes	

== Accolades ==
=== Awards and nominations ===
Year	Award	Category	Recipient	Result	Ref.
2011	47th Baeksang Arts Awards	Best New Director (TV)	Lee Eung-bok	Nominated	
2011	6th Seoul International Drama Awards	Best Miniseries	Dream High	Nominated	
2011	SKY PerfecTV! Awards	Grand Prize	Dream High	Won	
2011	5th Tokyo International Drama Festival	Special Award for Foreign Drama	Dream High	Won	
2011	7th Innolife Japan Entertainment Awards	Best Drama - Grand Prize	Dream High	Nominated	
2011	The Fact Awards	Best Drama	Dream High	2nd place	
2012	Rose d'Or Awards	Golden Rose (Children & Youth) Award	Dream High	Won	
2012	7th Seoul International Drama Awards	Outstanding Korean Drama	Dream High	Nominated	
2013	USTv Student's Choice Award	Best Foreign Soap Opera	Dream High	Won	
2013	2nd Asia Rainbow TV Awards	Outstanding Modern Drama	Secret Love	Nominated	
2014	Houston International Film Festival	Bronze Medal in Drama	Secret Love	Nominated	
2016	52nd Baeksang Arts Awards	Grand Prize (TV)	Descendants of the Sun	Won	
2016	52nd Baeksang Arts Awards	Best Drama	Descendants of the Sun	Nominated	
2016	43rd Korean Broadcasting Grand Prize	Best Drama	Descendants of the Sun	Won	
2016	11th Seoul International Drama Awards	Excellent Korean Drama	Descendants of the Sun	Won	
2016	5th APAN Star Awards	Drama of the Year	Descendants of the Sun	Won	
2016	9th Korea Drama Awards	Best Drama	Descendants of the Sun	Won	
2016	Korean Advertisers Association Awards	Best Drama	Descendants of the Sun	Won	
2016	21st Asian Television Awards	Best Drama Series	Descendants of the Sun	Won	
2017	Korea Communications Commission Broadcasting Awards	Grand Prize for Excellence in Production	Descendants of the Sun	Won	
2017	50th WorldFest-Houston International Film Festival	Special Jury Award (TV series)	Descendants of the Sun	Won	
2017	First Brand Awards	Special Award	Guardian: The Lonely and Great God	Won	
2017	11th Korean Cable TV Awards	Best Drama	Guardian: The Lonely and Great God	Won	
2017	11th Korean Cable TV Awards	VOD Broadcasting	Guardian: The Lonely and Great God	Won	
2017	5th Annual DramaFever Awards	Best Melodrama	Guardian: The Lonely and Great God	Won	
2017	53rd Baeksang Arts Awards	Best Drama	Guardian: The Lonely and Great God	Nominated	
2017	53rd Baeksang Arts Awards	Best Director	Lee Eung-bok	Nominated	
2017	10th Korea Drama Awards	Best Drama	Guardian: The Lonely and Great God	Won	
2017	10th Korea Drama Awards	Best Production Director	Lee Eung-bok	Nominated	
2017	22nd Asian Television Awards	Best Drama Series	Guardian: The Lonely and Great God	Nominated	
2018	6th APAN Star Awards	Drama of the Year	Mr. Sunshine	Won	
2019	55th Baeksang Arts Awards	Best Drama	Mr. Sunshine	Nominated	
2019	55th Baeksang Arts Awards	Best Director	Lee Eung-bok	Nominated	
2019	1st Asia Contents Awards & Global OTT Awards	Best Creative	Mr. Sunshine	Won	
2021	Asian Academy Creative Awards	Best Direction	Lee Eung-bok	Won	
2021	Asia Contents Awards	Best OTT Original	Sweet Home	Nominated	
2021	Asia Contents Awards	Creative Beyond Border	Sweet Home	Nominated	
2021	Seoul International Drama Awards	Outstanding Korean Drama	Sweet Home	Nominated	

=== State honors ===
Name of country, year given, and name of honor
Country	Award Ceremony	Year	Honor	Ref.
South Korea	7th Korean Popular Culture and Arts Awards	2017	Prime Minister's Commendation	
