= Descendants of the Sun =

2016 South Korean television series

- Promotional poster
- Hangul: 태양의 후예
- Hanja: 太陽의 後裔
- RR: Taeyangui huye
- MR: T'aeyangŭi huye
- Genre: Romance; Melodrama; Action
- Written by: Kim Eun-sook; Kim Won-seok
- Directed by: Lee Eung-bok; Baek Sang-hoon; Yoo Young-eun; Kim Hyung-jun
- Starring: Song Joong-ki; Song Hye-kyo; Jin Goo; Kim Ji-won
- Composers: Song Dong-woon; Gaemi
- Country of origin: South Korea
- Original language: Korean
- No. of episodes: 16 + 3 (special)

Production
- Executive producers: Bae Kyung-soo (Chief producer); Kim Woo-taek; Seo Woo-shik; Jang Kyung-ik
- Producers: Ham Young-hoon; Yoo Jong-sun; Park Woo-ram
- Production locations: South Korea; Greece
- Running time: 60 minutes
- Production companies: KBS; Next Entertainment World; Barunson Inc.; Descendants of the Sun SPC
- Budget: ₩13 billion

Original release
- Network: KBS2
- Release: February 24 – April 22, 2016

Descendants of the Sun (Korean: 태양의 후예) is a 2016 South Korean television series starring Song Joong-ki, Song Hye-kyo, Jin Goo, and Kim Ji-won. Written by Kim Eun-sook and Kim Won-seok, the series follows the relationship between Yoo Shi-jin, a captain in the South Korean Army's special forces, and Kang Mo-yeon, a surgeon. Their different views on life and duty initially separate them, but they eventually meet again in a fictional disaster-stricken country during a humanitarian mission. A subplot explores the forbidden romance between Seo Dae-young, a master sergeant, and Yoon Myung-joo, an army doctor.

Development began in 2011; Kim Eun-sook later adapted Kim Won-seok's manuscript, Doctors Without Borders. Pre-production involved location scouting and a crew of over 350. Directed by Lee Eung-bok and Baek Sang-hoon, the series was filmed in South Korea and Greece with a budget of ₩13 billion. It was fully produced before broadcast, departing from the live-shoot production method standard in the Korean television industry at the time. The original soundtrack was composed by Song Dong-woon and Gaemi. Comprising 16 episodes and three specials, it aired on KBS from February 24 to April 22, 2016. It was the first Korean drama to be simulcast in China via iQIYI and was eventually exported to 32 countries.

Descendants of the Sun received positive reviews for its performances and dialogue, though some critics questioned its narrative plausibility and extensive product placement. It became the first miniseries in South Korea to surpass 30% in viewership ratings since 2012. Credited with boosting the Korean Wave, it had an estimated economic impact of ₩3 trillion from increased tourism, exports, and product sales. It received numerous accolades, including the Grand Prize in television at the 52nd Baeksang Arts Awards and Best Drama at the 9th Korea Drama Awards. Local remakes were produced in the Philippines and Vietnam.

== Cast and characters ==
=== Main ===
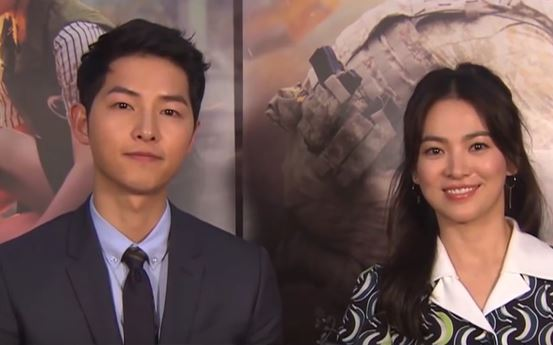
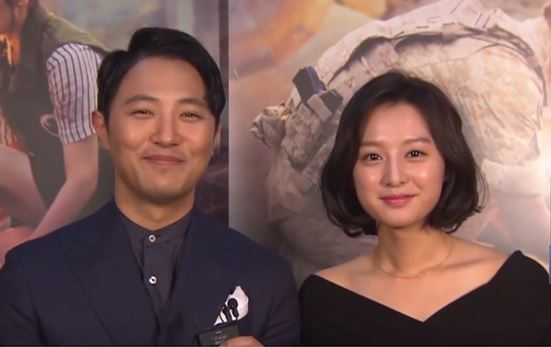
The four lead actors at a press conference in February 2016. Clockwise from top left: Song Joong-ki as Yoo Shi-jin and Song Hye-kyo as Kang Mo-yeon; Jin Goo as Seo Dae-young and Kim Ji-won as Yoon Myung-joo.
- Song Joong-ki as Captain Yoo Shi-jin:

A captain in the 707th Special Mission Group, the leader of Alpha Team, and a member of the Taebaek Unit. Shi-jin is an elite soldier in the Republic of Korea Army, known for his bravery, discipline, and accountability. He falls in love with Kang Mo-yeon when they first meet; their romance is complicated by his deadly military duties and her commitment to saving lives. Despite his professional exterior, Shi-jin has a playful personality. During humanitarian crises in fictional Uruk, his loyalty and compassion earn him the nickname "Captain Korea". In the finale, he is promoted to major. His call sign is Big Boss.

- Song Hye-kyo as Kang Mo-yeon:

A cardiothoracic surgeon at Haesung Hospital with a strong commitment to medical ethics. Sharp and impatient when confronting medical injustices, she demonstrates a sense of duty and sound judgment during emergencies in Uruk. Although she falls in love with Shi-jin at first sight, Mo-yeon initially suppresses her feelings because of their differing professional ethics; she eventually embraces the risks of their relationship.

- Jin Goo as Master Sergeant Seo Dae-young:

The vice-captain of Alpha Team and Shi-jin's best friend. A model soldier, he is recognized for his stoicism, discipline, and loyalty. Though he loves Yoon Myung-joo, they are kept apart by military hierarchy and her father's disapproval. Throughout the series, he is torn between his duty and his feelings for her, eventually reconciling both without resigning from the army. His nickname is Wolf.

- Kim Ji-won as First Lieutenant Yoon Myung-joo:

An army surgeon and the only daughter of Commander Yoon Gil-joon. Strong-willed, she defies her father to pursue a relationship with Dae-young. Her role connects several storylines. She and Mo-yeon are former medical school classmates; their relationship evolves from rivalry to close friendship.

=== Supporting ===
==== Alpha Team and Taebaek Unit ====
- Park Hoon as Sergeant Choi Woo-geun: A bomb disposal specialist, sniper, and the only married member of Alpha Team, nicknamed Snoopy.
- Choi Woong as Staff Sergeant Gong Cheol-ho: The youngest member of Alpha Team, nicknamed Harry Potter.
- Ahn Bo-hyun as Sergeant Lim Gwang-nam: An Alpha Team sniper, nicknamed Piccolo.
- Kang Shin-il as Lieutenant General Yoon Gil-joon: Myung-joo's father. He opposes his daughter's relationship with Dae-young.
- Kim Byung-chul as Lieutenant Colonel Park Byung-soo: The commander of the Taebaek Unit in Uruk. An impulsive leader, he often clashes with Shi-jin, whose unpredictable behavior frequently causes difficulties with Park's superiors.
- Kim Min-seok as Private First Class Kim Ki-bum: A former pickpocket, he enlists in the army after Shi-jin and Dae-young subdue him; Dae-young then personally trains him. His storyline shows how military service reforms and disciplines individuals.

==== Haesung Hospital Medical Services Team ====
- Onew as Lee Chi-hoon: A first-year thoracic surgery resident who is initially naive and sheltered. Chi-hoon's storyline centers on his professional development; the Uruk earthquake forces him to confront his inadequacies and professional guilt. He is engaged to fellow resident Jang Hee-eun.
- Lee Seung-joon as Song Sang-hyun: A general surgeon and Mo-yeon's senior colleague. Despite his disorganized nature and comedic demeanor, he is a skilled physician. He has pursued Ha Ja-ae for many years.
- Seo Jeong-yeon as Ha Ja-ae: The pragmatic and stoic head nurse of Haesung's emergency room. She and Song lead rescue efforts in Uruk and share an on-and-off relationship.
- Park Hwan-hee as Choi Min-ji: The youngest nurse in the medical team. Known for her bright personality, she provides comic relief despite her fear of making medical errors during high-pressure missions.

==== People at Haesung Hospital ====
- Hyun Jyu-ni as Pyo Ji-soo: A pathologist and Mo-yeon's confidante. She uses a wheelchair, though the series does not explain why.
- Tae In-ho as Han Seok-won: The hospital chairman. He prioritizes ambition and power over medical ethics, and retaliates against Mo-yeon by assigning her to the Uruk medical team after she rejects his sexual advances.
- Park Ah-in as Kim Eun-ji: A professor appointed through nepotism, Eun-ji is insolent and frequently belittles her colleagues.
- Jo Woo-ri as Jang Hee-eun: An anesthesiology resident and Lee Chi-hoon's pregnant fiancée, who fears for his safety during the Uruk disaster.

==== Others ====
- David Lee McInnis as David Agus: An antagonist, a former Delta Force soldier and Shi-jin's former comrade. After leaving the military in pursuit of wealth, he becomes a black market gang leader in Uruk. He causes internal conflict for Shi-jin, who struggles with having to kill a former ally turned criminal.
- Jo Jae-yoon as Jin Young-soo: The executive manager of the Uruk Power Plant. He is unscrupulous and subservient to Agus; his actions complicate matters for the protagonists and inadvertently cause an outbreak of the M3 virus.
- Ji Seung-hyun as Senior Lieutenant Ahn Jung-joon of the Korean People's Army: An elite North Korean officer. Initially a rival to Shi-jin, he becomes an ally after Shi-jin helps him expose a conspiracy involving a high-ranking superior. This joint operation clears Ahn of false charges and saves his life. Ahn later repays the debt by rescuing Shi-jin and Dae-young.
- Jasper Cho as Daniel Spencer: An aid doctor with Peacemaker and a skilled handyman who runs a hardware store.
- Jeon Soo-jin as Ri Ye-hwa: A Koryo-saram nurse with Peacemaker and Daniel's wife.
- Lee Yi-kyung as Kang Min-jae: A worker at the Uruk Power Plant and a survivor of the earthquake. His resentment toward Lee Chi-hoon following a failed rescue attempt drives Chi-hoon's character arc.
- Zyon Barreto as Fatima: A girl nicknamed "Red Rose". After Mo-yeon and Shi-jin save her from a human trafficking ring, she presents an ethical dilemma for Mo-yeon.
- Elena Zhernovaia as Valentine: A waitress who assists the relief team.
- Jun In-taek as Yoo Young-geun: Shi-jin's father and a retired master sergeant. Respect for his father motivated Shi-jin to pursue a military career.

=== Special appearances ===
Actors and characters who made special appearances and were acknowledged in the closing credits:

- Lee Kwang-soo as a shooting arcade operator (episode 1).
- Jung Ji-won as a television announcer (episodes 2, 16).
- Lee Jong-hyuk as Captain Kim Jin-seok (episodes 2, 5, 10, 15): A soldier killed in action during a battle to rescue Agus; he appears solely in Shi-jin's flashbacks.
- Ryu Hwa-young as Seo Dae-young's ex-girlfriend (episode 4).
- Park Joon-geum as Lee Chi-hoon's mother (episodes 7, 11).
- Yoo Ah-in as a bank teller (episode 13).
- Lee Jae-yong as Lieutenant General Choi Ji-ho of the Korean People's Army (episodes 13, 14): The mastermind behind the employment of North Korean special forces as contract killers for criminal syndicates. With Shi-jin's assistance, Ahn exposes him as a traitor to his country.
- Red Velvet as themselves (episode 16): The group visits the military base to perform "Dumb Dumb".

== Episodes ==
No.	Title	Original release date
1	"Episode 1"	February 24, 2016
Alpha Team, commanded by Yoo Shi-jin and Seo Dae-young, defuses a hostage crisis involving North Korean forces in the Demilitarized Zone (DMZ). Before withdrawing, Shi-jin recognizes the opposing commander as Ahn Jung-joon. While on leave, Shi-jin and Dae-young apprehend a thief named Kim Ki-bum. As they prepare to take him to the hospital, Ki-bum steals Dae-young's mobile phone. To retrieve the phone, Shi-jin visits Haesung Hospital, where he meets Dr. Kang Mo-yeon. She initially mistakes him for a gangster. The history between Dae-young and Yoon Myung-joo, an army surgeon, is revealed; Myung-joo's father, a general, opposes their relationship, believing Dae-young is not a suitable match for his daughter. Mo-yeon warms to Shi-jin after reviewing CCTV footage that proves he is a soldier. Shi-jin feigns a wound to spend time with her. However, he is forced to cancel their first date when he receives orders for an urgent mission.
2	"Episode 2"	February 25, 2016
Shi-jin's team conducts a hostage rescue operation in Afghanistan alongside US Delta Force operators. Meanwhile, Mo-yeon is passed over for a professorship for the third time in favor of a less capable colleague with family connections. When Shi-jin returns, he and Mo-yeon attempt another date, but he is again summoned for duty. They realize their philosophical differences: Mo-yeon is a doctor dedicated to saving lives at all costs, while Shi-jin is a soldier who must obey orders and sometimes take lives to protect freedom. Consequently, they agree to end their relationship. Eight months later, Shi-jin is deployed to the fictional country of Uruk. Mo-yeon, having become a celebrity doctor and the hospital's face after a TV appearance, is assigned to lead a medical volunteer team to Uruk. Mo-yeon's team arrives at the Uruk airfield, where she and Shi-jin reunite.
3	"Episode 3"	March 2, 2016
Shi-jin and Mo-yeon navigate their reunion; Shi-jin pranks her about stepping on a landmine. Despite her father's objections, Myung-joo deploys to Uruk to find Dae-young. General Yoon orders Dae-young's return to South Korea. During a trip to town, Shi-jin introduces Mo-yeon to Ri Ye-hwa, a nurse, and takes her to a shipwreck on a beach, where he discusses Dae-young and Myung-joo's past. Arab League Chairman Mubarak is transported to the base in critical condition. Although emergency surgery is required, the Chairman's bodyguards draw weapons on the South Korean troops and refuse to allow the procedure. After Mo-yeon confirms she can save him, Shi-jin defies orders and commands his team to aim their weapons at the bodyguards to protect Mo-yeon as she begins the operation.
4	"Episode 4"	March 3, 2016
The surgery on Chairman Mubarak is successful. Shi-jin is immediately relieved of duty and detained for insubordination. When Mubarak recovers, the diplomatic tension is resolved; Shi-jin is released but faces disciplinary action, including a pay cut and removal from the promotion list. Mo-yeon attempts to take responsibility, but Shi-jin insists his decisions were based on military honor and principles. At the airport, Dae-young encounters Myung-joo just as he is departing. Myung-joo confronts him for avoiding her and recalls their past relationship in tears. Later, Shi-jin and Mo-yeon share wine and conversation, and he kisses her.
5	"Episode 5"	March 9, 2016
While searching for a runaway child suffering from lead poisoning, Shi-jin encounters a smuggler and recognizes him as David Agus, a former comrade he once saved during a lethal operation. Agus now leads a criminal syndicate involved in arms dealing and diamond smuggling, in collusion with construction manager Jin Young-soo. Mo-yeon accidentally drives her car off-road; the vehicle teeters precariously over a cliff. Shi-jin arrives and rescues her by steering the vehicle into the sea. The incident forces Mo-yeon to confront the danger of Shi-jin's lifestyle. Before departing for South Korea, Shi-jin asks Mo-yeon about her feelings regarding their kiss, but leaves without saying goodbye.
6	"Episode 6"	March 10, 2016
Mo-yeon admits her attraction to Shi-jin but expresses fear about his dangerous occupation. Back in Korea, Shi-jin and Dae-young discuss life while enjoying their leave. A magnitude 6.7 earthquake shatters the area as Mo-yeon's medical team is leaving Uruk, destroying the power plant where they were operating. The team cancels their flight and rushes to the disaster site to assist. Amid the chaos, Mo-yeon organizes triage efforts. Shi-jin and Dae-young are part of a special forces squad sent to Uruk by the South Korean military. Shi-jin and Mo-yeon reunite amid the rubble as the relief helicopter lands.
7	"Episode 7"	March 16, 2016
Rescue operations proceed under hazardous conditions. Mo-yeon and Myung-joo perform open-air surgery in a contaminated environment. Shi-jin and Mo-yeon discover two survivors trapped in the rubble: saving one will inevitably cause the structure to crush the other. Shi-jin leaves the decision to Mo-yeon. Manager Jin demands that the soldiers prioritize recovering his hidden diamonds, but Shi-jin refuses. Based on the younger survivor's medical viability, Mo-yeon chooses to save him. The rescue crew extracts the survivor for surgery. Dae-young and Myung-joo reunite. Later, Mo-yeon stitches a wound Shi-jin sustained while protecting Manager Jin. Shi-jin confesses that he missed her constantly.
8	"Episode 8"	March 17, 2016
Mo-yeon relays Manager Go's final words to his family. Agus threatens Manager Jin to recover the diamonds buried in the office where the last survivor, Kang Min-jae, remains trapped. As rescue efforts shift to the office, an aftershock hits. Shi-jin and Dae-young enter the structure to treat Min-jae. Impatient for his diamonds, Manager Jin uses an excavator and causes a collapse that traps Shi-jin and Min-jae. Dae-young eventually clears the debris and rescues them. The military announces a flight home for the medical team. When communications are restored, Mo-yeon connects her phone to the base speakers to play music but accidentally broadcasts her recorded "last words" from the cliff incident, in which she confesses her love for Shi-jin.
9	"Episode 9"	March 23, 2016
Humiliated by the broadcast, Mo-yeon tries to avoid Shi-jin, who teases her relentlessly. While driving, they inadvertently enter a minefield shifted by the earthquake. Facing death, Mo-yeon admits her feelings. General Yoon grants Dae-young permission to date Myung-joo on the condition that he be discharged from the army. Agus discovers the diamonds are missing. Manager Jin has swallowed them and attempts to flee to Korea, but is hunted by Agus's gang. Investigating a measles outbreak, Shi-jin and Mo-yeon find a "Haunted Village" where orphans are trafficked. They confront Agus, and a child named Fatima shoots him. Mo-yeon struggles between her medical ethics and hatred for Agus, but Shi-jin orders her to save him as a doctor.
10	"Episode 10"	March 24, 2016
After the surgery, Agus warns Mo-yeon that being near Shi-jin invites danger. Shi-jin is ordered not to interfere with Agus, who is a CIA asset in a planned coup. Despite concerns for the trafficked children, Shi-jin tells Mo-yeon they are safe. Fatima steals painkillers and is lured into a trap; Shi-jin and Mo-yeon rescue her from arms dealers. Manager Jin is captured and brought to the medical center to have the diamonds surgically removed. During the procedure, blood spatters on Mo-yeon and Myung-joo, and they realize Jin is infected with the M3 virus, a pathogen similar to Ebola. The operating room is quarantined. Upon receiving the test results, Dae-young confirms Myung-joo's infection by embracing her in the isolation zone.
11	"Episode 11"	March 30, 2016
Exposed personnel and Myung-joo are placed under quarantine. Shi-jin keeps spirits high while Mo-yeon controls the outbreak. When Agus seizes the vehicle carrying the cure and demands the diamonds in return, Myung-joo's condition deteriorates. Shi-jin recovers the medicine, and Myung-joo's condition improves. To force Shi-jin to help him escape, Agus kidnaps Mo-yeon. Shi-jin takes off his uniform to begin an unapproved solo rescue attempt in defiance of orders to stand down. Dae-young realizes his friend's intent and the extreme danger he faces.
12	"Episode 12"	March 31, 2016
Dae-young and Alpha Team strip off their uniforms to covertly back up Shi-jin. Infiltrating Agus's base, they find the trafficked children. Alpha Team steps in as Agus gives the order to execute the children. While Dae-young and Shi-jin face Agus, one group protects the kids. Agus straps a bomb to Mo-yeon's vest and uses her as a human shield. Shi-jin shoots the detonator on her shoulder, and his team disarms the bomb seconds before detonation. As Agus lunges for his firearm, Shi-jin kills his former comrade to keep Mo-yeon safe. Later, Mo-yeon accepts the reality of Shi-jin's dangerous life, and they reaffirm their love.
13	"Episode 13"	April 6, 2016
The medical team returns to Haesung Hospital. Mo-yeon resigns to open a clinic but is forced to return to the hospital after her loan is rejected. Alpha Team returns and celebrates for three days. Dae-young submits his discharge application; Myung-joo finds out and they argue. Shi-jin gifts Mo-yeon a necklace. He is then assigned to provide security for inter-Korean peace talks in Pyongyang, where he meets Ahn again. Later in Seoul, Ahn is rushed to Haesung's ER with critical gunshot wounds. Mo-yeon is shocked when a second ambulance arrives with an unconscious, bloodied Shi-jin.
14	"Episode 14"	April 7, 2016
Mo-yeon saves Shi-jin. Flashbacks reveal Ahn was ambushed when he asked Shi-jin for assistance in battling traitors among his own ranks. Shi-jin persuades Ahn that the South Korean physicians are impartial. Shi-jin sets up a secret discussion amid calls for Ahn's extradition and charges of wrongdoing. Ahn reveals he is hunting a traitor, Minister Choi Ji-ho. Shi-jin gives Ahn a snack containing a listening device. During a confrontation, Ahn forces Choi to confess. Shi-jin signals a sniper to shoot Ahn non-lethally to resolve the standoff. A diplomatic breakthrough results when the recorded confession exposes Choi.
15	"Episode 15"	April 13, 2016
Near the three-month mission's end, Shi-jin and Dae-young are presumed dead in an explosion. Mo-yeon and Myung-joo are devastated upon receiving their final letters. One year later, Mo-yeon volunteers in Albania, while Myung-joo returns to Uruk. In the Albanian desert, Mo-yeon hears Shi-jin's voice over the radio. He appears in the distance, and they share an emotional reunion.
16	"Episode 16"	April 14, 2016
Dae-young reunites with Myung-joo in Uruk. The men explain they were captured and held for months but were rescued by Ahn just before execution. General Yoon finally approves Dae-young and Myung-joo's relationship. In Canada, at Daniel and Ye-hwa's wedding, a volcano erupts nearby; the entire team immediately prepares for a humanitarian relief mission.
Special episodes
S1	"Special 1"	April 20, 2016
A recap of key plot points and scenes from Episode 1 to the middle of Episode 7.
S2	"Special 2"	April 21, 2016
A continuation of the recap, covering scenes from the middle of Episode 7 through Episode 16.
S3	"Special 3"	April 22, 2016
A behind-the-scenes documentary covering the 258-day production period, featuring interviews with the cast and detailing the challenges faced by the crew.

== Production ==
=== Development ===
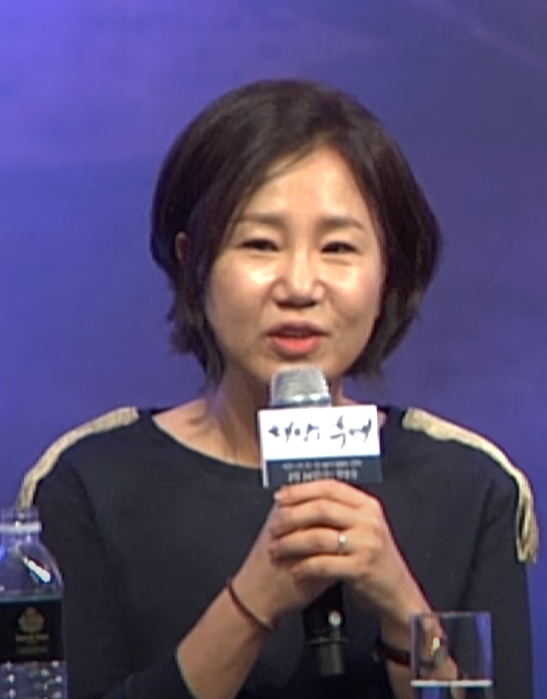
Kim Eun-sook adapted the series from an existing screenplay by Kim Won-seok.

On February 18, 2014, Hwa&Dam Pictures announced that writers Kim Eun-sook and Kim Won-seok were collaborating on a series tentatively titled Descendants of the Sun. The project was described as a "humanistic blockbuster" melodrama set in disaster zones, a rarity in Korean drama history. It was originally slated to air on SBS.

Planning began in 2011, though the project initially received a "not very bright" industry assessment due to its high budget and risky disaster-themed setting. Kim Eun-sook contacted Kim Won-seok to collaborate on adapting his screenplay, Doctors Without Borders (국경없는 의사회), which received the Korea Creative Content Agency's Director Excellence Award at the 2011 Korean Content Story Awards. The pair reconstructed the script, debating and revising until they reached consensus. They drew inspiration from the humanitarian efforts of World Vision, 119 emergency medical services, Médecins Sans Frontières, and the Republic of Korea Army Special Warfare Command.

To strengthen the romantic and melodramatic elements, Kim Eun-sook changed the protagonist, Yoo Shi-jin, from a doctor to a special forces officer in the Republic of Korea Army. She stated that the fictional mission was inspired by the ROK Army's 2004 deployment to Iraq. Researcher Patrick Flamm noted that the series' title and its setting in "Uruk" allude to the ancient Sumerian city and the Epic of Gilgamesh. Kim Won-seok described her ability to move readers through script revisions as "magic", joking that "if [she] wrote the money-making melodramatic scenes, I wrote the money-spending action scenes." To ensure authenticity, Kim Won-seok and the production crew consulted the ROK Army Headquarters and medical experts.

In July 2014, Hwa&Dam Pictures transferred the project to Barunson Inc.; Next Entertainment World (NEW) joined as investor and distributor, and Kim Eun-sook ended her twelve-year association with SBS. The network ultimately declined the series, citing concerns that a disaster-themed melodrama set abroad lacked commercial appeal and that the prevalence of military uniforms would restrict product placement opportunities. Several other networks rejected the project due to its "blockbuster" scale and an initial budget estimate of ₩30 billion. In October 2014, KBS agreed to broadcast the series and began discussing production plans for the first half of 2015. Bae Kyung-soo was the executive producer, and Ham Young-hoon, Yoo Jong-sun, and Park Woo-ram were producers.

=== Pre-production ===
On November 13, 2014, Lee Eung-bok was announced as the director of Descendants of the Sun. While overseas production was initially planned for late 2014, the team postponed it to mid-2015 and selected locations in Greece for principal filming. To meet Chinese market requirements, the series was entirely pre-produced, a departure from the traditional Korean live-shoot model. Although intended to improve production quality and actor immersion, this format risked mistimed brand sponsorships and precluded adjustments based on real-time viewer feedback. The production team considered the move a financial necessity to ensure simultaneous broadcast in China; they had originally viewed partial pre-production as more viable because a full pre-shoot significantly increased costs beyond industry norms.

By mid-January 2015, casting for the lead roles was underway. Song Joong-ki accepted the male lead as his first role after military service, and Song Hye-kyo was reported to be a strong candidate. Their casting drew attention following recent successes: Song Joong-ki in The Innocent Man (2012) and Song Hye-kyo in That Winter, the Wind Blows (2013) and My Brilliant Life (2014). On April 2, 2015, Song Hye-kyo, Jin Goo, and Kim Ji-won were confirmed for their roles. Song Joong-ki starred as special forces team leader Yoo Shi-jin, alongside Song Hye-kyo as doctor Kang Mo-yeon. Jin Goo played non-commissioned officer Seo Dae-young, and Kim Ji-won portrayed army surgeon Yoon Myung-joo.

Later in April, SM Entertainment confirmed Shinee's Onew as a junior doctor under Mo-yeon. The following month, KBS announced the addition of Kang Shin-il and Seo Jeong-yeon; the former was initially cast as Yoo Shi-jin's father. Further additions included Jo Woo-ri as Onew's partner, Hyun Jyu-ni as Mo-yeon's friend, Lee Seung-joon as a senior doctor, and Lee Yi-kyung. Jo Jae-yoon was later confirmed to play an antagonistic construction manager. The production employed more than 350 staff members. In October 2014, Hangzhou-based Huace Media bought a 13.03% stake in NEW for CN¥323 million (₩53.5 billion) to provide funding ahead of pre-production. Before filming began in early June 2015, distribution rights were sold to China at a premium; driven by the popularity of Kim Eun-sook and Song Hye-kyo, this sale helped offset production costs. Additional financial support was provided by Dal.komm Coffee and the Export–Import Bank of Korea.

=== Filming ===
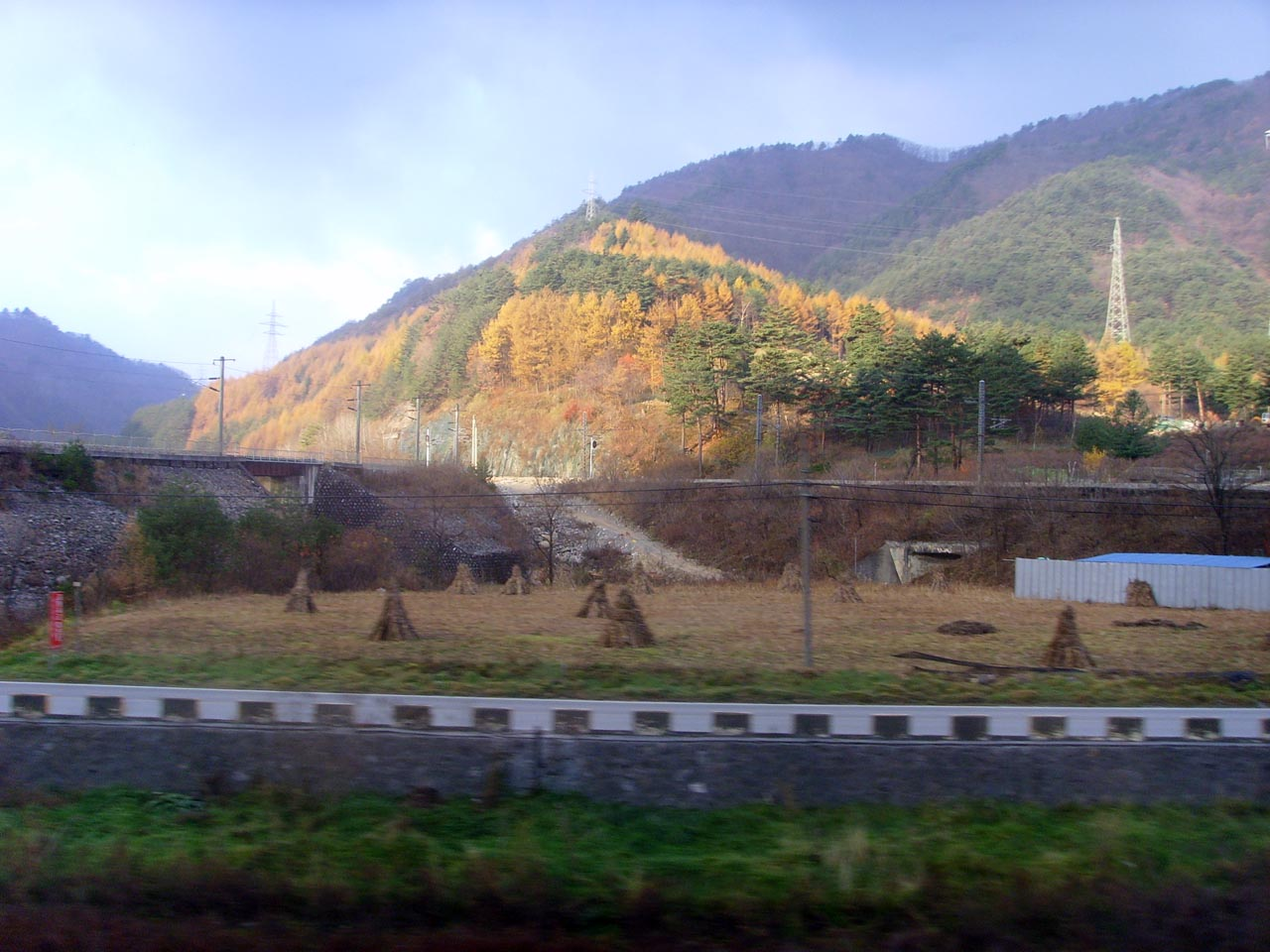
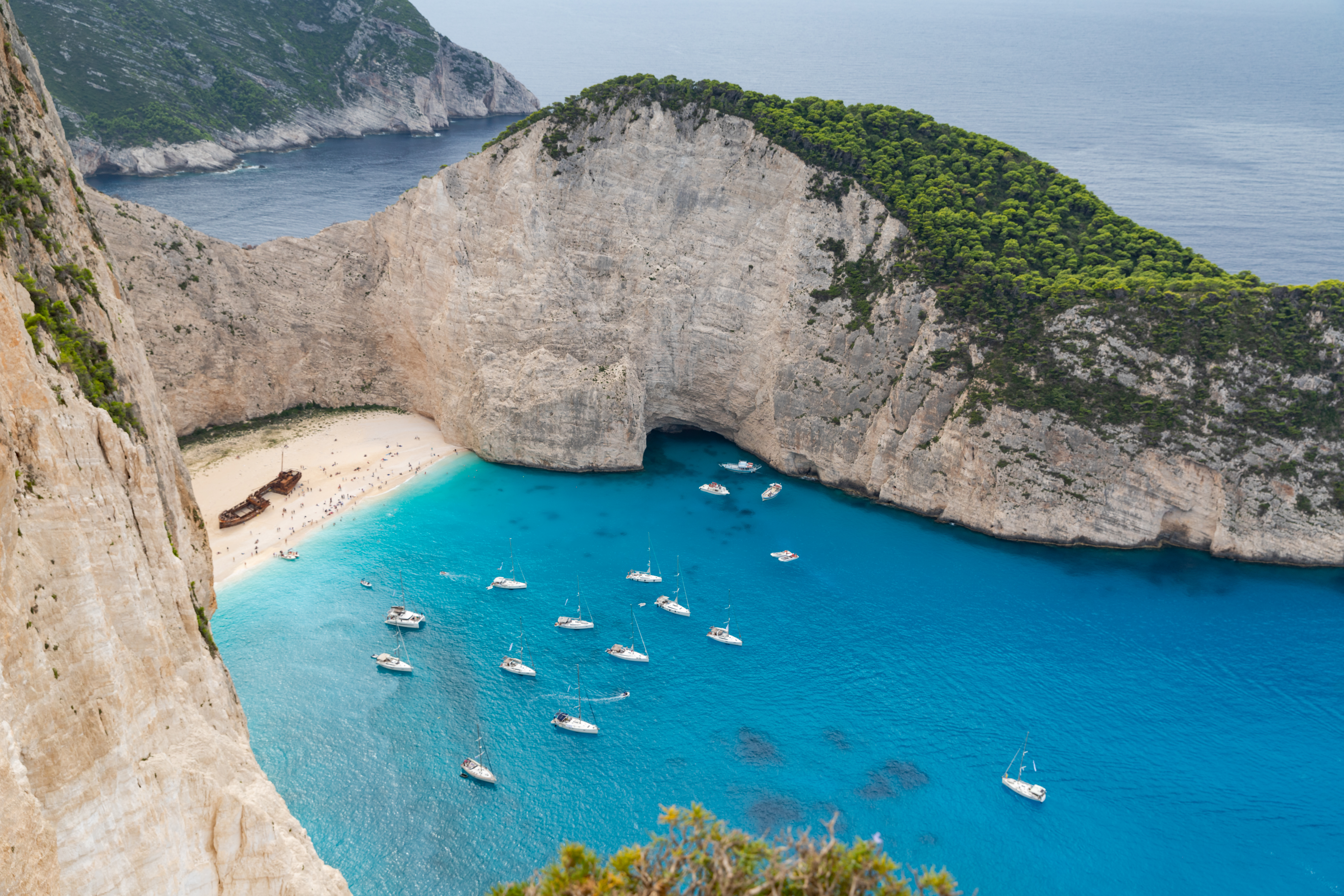
The series was filmed in Taebaek, South Korea (top), and on the island of Zakynthos, Greece (bottom).

The cast attended the first script reading on May 28, 2015. Principal photography began on June 12 in South Korea, where filming occurred over the next three months at various locations, including military bases and hospitals. The production received support from the ROK Army and the Ministry of Culture, Sports and Tourism. Scenes set in the fictional country of Uruk, inspired by Iraq, were filmed on a 19,500-square-metre (210,000 sq ft) set in Taebaek and an indoor set in Anseong.

Production moved to Greece from September 28 to November 2, 2015. Filming focused on the coastal scenery of Zakynthos, specifically Navagio Beach, the backdrop for a date scene between the leads. To meet the Chinese National Radio and Television Administration's deadline for simultaneous broadcast review, filming was scheduled to be completed in South Korea by December. Although most of his scenes wrapped late in the year, Ji Seung-hyun filmed his first-episode scenes in August. On November 23, Song Joong-ki was injured during an action sequence, which suspended his filming for two weeks. Principal photography wrapped on December 30, 2015.

=== Post-production ===
The production allocated ₩2 billion to art design, with computer-generated imagery (CGI) for the Uruk landscape and earthquake sequences accounting for a significant, though undisclosed, portion of post-production costs. Visual effects (VFX) were used to depict dangerous sequences safely and insert localized product placement for the Chinese broadcast. At a February 2016 press conference, the production team described the series as a story of "wonderful young people" and said that pre-production improved the script's quality; Kim Eun-sook called it her best "fantasy" script. She said that while pre-production helped the cast understand their characters, her inability to adjust the script during filming caused concern over the emotional impact of certain scenes. The series had a production cost of ₩13 billion, which was fully recouped before the first broadcast.

== Thematic analysis ==
Descendants of the Sun blends romance, melodrama, and action; it explores South Korean themes that scholars view as cultural diplomacy to make the series relatable to international audiences. The screenplay combines traditional values—loyalty, filial piety, and righteousness—with modern ideals of equality, personal independence, and international humanitarianism. During crises, the protagonists prioritize professional duty and saving lives over romance. The script incorporates humor and relies on conventional melodrama and traditional gender roles, in which "the man protects" and "the woman waits".

The series portrays South Korea as a morally upright, developed peacekeeper and helps normalize overseas troop deployments as a natural part of Korea's global role. It appeals to the younger shinsedae (new generation), who are considered conservative on security issues but more overtly nationalist than earlier generations. By depicting an Arab League leader sympathetically and referencing 1970s South Korean construction projects in the Middle East, the drama sought to expand the Korean Wave into Arab markets. It portrays Korean reunification, (Note: Depicted in episode 14 through the mutual aid pact between Yoo Shi-jin and Ahn Jung-joon.) the United States–South Korea alliance, (Note: Depicted through the interactions between US and South Korean forces.) patriotism, (Note: Depicted in episode 3 by the flag-raising scene in Uruk, suggesting that Korean citizens remain culturally tied to their homeland regardless of location.) and social discipline regardless of status. (Note: Depicted in episode 12 when the South Korean President personally thanks Commander Yoon for protecting citizens.)

Descendants of the Sun depicts the South Korean military in a fantasy-like manner, with no realistic internal violence, corruption, or oppression, and portrays it as an organization that nurtures youth and transforms lives. Often compared to a "drama version" of the variety show Real Man (2013–2016), the series avoids daily barracks life to focus on romance and melodrama. Critic Kwon Chang-gyu wrote that Yoo Shi-jin is an "honorable" soldier whose insubordination constitutes an ethical stance against state failure; however, such actions would violate military law and are unrealistic.

The series uses non-verbal communication to convey humanism and portrays Confucian values. It depicts a paternalistic hierarchy where seniors hold significant authority and have a duty to care for subordinates, though this power can be abused to pressure them into unethical situations. Descendants of the Sun incorporates Korean cultural motifs and specific uses of the Korean language. (Note: Depicted in multiple scenes where characters frequently use Korean with foreigners; for example, Kang Mo-yeon speaks Korean to a local child in episode 5 and defiantly refuses to use English while held hostage in episode 11.) The presentation of kimchi in Uruk affirms Korean identity abroad and promotes the dish to global viewers as an entry point to "Korean-ness". The show merges this culinary tradition with the custom of saying "cheese" when taking photographs.

By focusing on contemporary achievements while omitting South Korea's history of poverty and conflict, Descendants of the Sun frames overseas military deployment as a hallmark of the nation's modernized international status. Female characters wear modern attire that remains "polite and proper" by avoiding excessive exposure; this lack of Westernization allows audiences across Asian markets to feel a cultural attachment. The fictional setting of Uruk and the show's title reference themes from the Epic of Gilgamesh, including power, glory, friendship, love, and mortality. The depiction of Korean-led development projects in Uruk reflects Seoul's nation-branding efforts; Patrick Flamm interprets this as public diplomacy intended to shift South Korea's international image from a "Korea discount" to a "premium brand".

== Original soundtrack ==
Producer Song Dong-woon collaborated with music director Gaemi on the original soundtrack (OST). Song previously managed soundtracks for dramas including The Chaser (2012), It's Okay, That's Love (2014), Three Days (2014), Pinocchio (2014–15), and Who Are You: School 2015 (2015). Selection began five to six months before the premiere; Song narrowed 700 to 800 candidates down to ten tracks. These underwent extensive revisions; choruses were rewritten dozens of times to complement the series. The production company aimed to create a "well-made album with collectible value" rather than "consumable" digital tracks. The OST was released as weekly digital singles starting February 18, 2016; several ballads feature a 20-piece orchestra and piano accompaniment.

The soundtrack's first release, "Always" by Yoon Mi-rae, is the love theme for the leads. Chen and Punch's "Everytime" is an orchestral mid-tempo track used during romantic scenes between Yoo Shi-jin and Kang Mo-yeon. "This Love" (이 사랑) by Davichi is accompanied by a piano and orchestra, playing during scenes between Seo Dae-young and Yoon Myung-joo. Gummy's "You Are My Everything" is the main theme for the lead couple; its lyrics describe a destined love. "Once Again" (다시 너를) by Kim Na-young and Mad Clown is a theme for Dae-young and Myung-joo and plays during flashback sequences. The track features a hip-hop beat with impassioned rap delivery.

K.Will's "Talk Love" (말해! 뭐해?) is a bright, mid-tempo pop track with a whistling theme and rhythmic guitar; its lyrics address the "tug-of-war" of romance. "With You" by Lyn is a love theme for Shi-jin and Mo-yeon; its arrangement builds in intensity. "By My Side" (사랑하자) by SG Wannabe is used for Dae-young and Myung-joo, featuring piano and orchestral arrangement. M.C the Max's "Wind Beneath Your Wings" (그대, 바람이 되어) features a shifting melody and plays during moments of crisis for the main couple. The final single, "How Can I Love You" by XIA, is a jazz ballad used during romantic scenes for both the lead and supporting couples.

During the broadcast, Gaemi and director Lee Eung-bok re-recorded four major tracks to improve synchronization with the drama's scenes. These adjustments included changing lyrics and keys; final mastering was completed in the US. Music&New released the soundtrack on CD in two volumes on March 24 and April 21, 2016, respectively. By the end of 2016, according to the Gaon Chart, the albums sold a combined 80,198 copies in South Korea. Two soundtrack concerts were held on May 14, 2016, featuring live performances and appearances by cast members, including Jin Goo and Kim Ji-won.

Descendants of the Sun Special Vol. 1

Soundtrack album by Various Artist
- Released: March 24, 2016
- Genre: Soundtrack
- Length: 68:52
- Labels: Music&NEW, OU Entertainment

Descendants of the Sun – Original Soundtrack Vol. 1
No.	Title	Artist	Length
1.	"Always"	Yoon Mi-rae	3:25
2.	"Everytime"	Chen and Punch	3:08
3.	"This Love" (이 사랑)	Davichi	3:46
4.	"You Are My Everything"	Gummy	4:00
5.	"Once Again" (다시 너를)	Kim Na-young featuring Mad Clown	3:55
6.	"Save the Day"	Gaemi	3:20
7.	"Mission Part 1"	Gaemi	4:25
8.	"Time Is Running Out"	Gaemi	3:29
9.	"Hidden Genius"	Gaemi	4:53
10.	"Endless War"	Gaemi	2:48
11.	"My Everything"	Gaemi	2:54
12.	"Heart Break"	Gaemi	4:16
13.	"Military Dignity"	Gaemi	2:08
14.	"Mission Part 2"	Gaemi	6:14
15.	"I Love You"	Gaemi	2:53
16.	"Aroma"	Gaemi	1:56
17.	"War of Tomorrow"	Gaemi	3:58
18.	"The Lover"	Gaemi	3:25
19.	"You Are My Everything (English Version)"	Gummy	4:00
Total length:			1:08:52

Descendants of the Sun Special Vol. 2

Soundtrack album by Various Artist
- Released: April 21, 2016
- Genre: Soundtrack
- Length: 63:32
- Labels: Music&NEW, OU Entertainment

Descendants of the Sun – Original Soundtrack Vol. 2
No.	Title	Artist	Length
1.	"Talk Love" (말해! 뭐해?)	K.Will	3:37
2.	"With You"	Lyn	4:15
3.	"By My Side" (사랑하자)	SG Wannabe	3:46
4.	"Wind Beneath Your Wings" (그대, 바람이 되어)	M.C the Max	3:55
5.	"How Can I Love You"	XIA	4:20
6.	"No More War"	Gaemi	3:52
7.	"Always I Love You"	Gaemi	2:42
8.	"Fighter"	Gaemi	2:32
9.	"Mission 2 Epic Tension"	Gaemi	4:45
10.	"Lonely Road"	Gaemi	4:18
11.	"Vital Fantasy"	Gaemi	3:01
12.	"Love You 2"	Gaemi	2:58
13.	"Don't Forget Me"	Gaemi	3:30
14.	"Time Is Running Out (Version 2)"	Gaemi	3:41
15.	"Attention (Mission Version)"	Gaemi	3:25
16.	"Move Forward"	Gaemi	3:41
17.	"Freedom"	Gaemi	3:40
18.	"Attention O.R.I"	Gaemi	1:51
Total length:			1:03:32

List of singles from Descendants of the Sun soundtrack
Title	Peak positions	Sales	Release date	Remarks
Title	Gaon	Sales	Release date	Remarks
"Always" (Yoon Mi-rae)	2	KOR (DL): 1,454,125+	February 18, 2016	Part 1
"Everytime" (Chen and Punch)	1	KOR (DL): 1,241,255+	February 25, 2016	Part 2
"This Love" (Davichi)	1	KOR (DL): 2,500,000+	March 3, 2016	Part 3
"You Are My Everything" (Gummy)	1	KOR (DL): 1,600,720+	March 10, 2016	Part 4
"Once Again" (Kim Na-young featuring Mad Clown)	2	KOR (DL): 1,056,319+	March 17, 2016	Part 5
"Talk Love" (K.Will)	1	KOR (DL): 1,347,821+	March 18, 2016	Part 6
"With You" (Lyn)	15	KOR (DL): 532,924+ (Note: Download sales for "With You" are aggregated from the following sources: First half of 2016 (495,379), July 2016 (23,316), and August 2016 (14,229).)	March 24, 2016	Part 7
"By My Side" (SG Wannabe)	8	KOR (DL): 864,429+	March 31, 2016	Part 8
"Wind Beneath Your Wings" (M.C the Max)	7	KOR (DL): 552,802+ (Note: Download sales for "Wind Beneath Your Wings" are aggregated from the following sources: First half of 2016 (507,195), July 2016 (27,655), and August 2016 (17,952).)	April 7, 2016	Part 9
"How Can I Love You" (XIA)	1	KOR (DL): 674,908+	April 14, 2016	Part 10

== Release ==
=== Promotion ===
During production, behind-the-scenes footage and stills of the cast were released online. On December 24, 2015, NEW released a 20-second clip on Facebook that highlighted the romantic chemistry between leads Song Joong-ki and Song Hye-kyo. The company followed this with a similar 23-second clip on December 29. The first official trailer for Descendants of the Sun premiered at the 2015 KBS Drama Awards. On January 8, 2016, NEW released a teaser focused on the emotional dynamic between Jin Goo and Kim Ji-won. Subsequent teasers released on January 15 and 21 introduced the styling, backgrounds, and personalities of Song Hye-kyo and Song Joong-ki. The first promotional poster, unveiled on February 1, 2016, depicted Song Joong-ki kneeling to tie Song Hye-kyo's shoelaces in a disaster-stricken setting.

On February 5, 2016, the main trailer was posted on Naver TV Cast, followed by a short behind-the-scenes countdown clip on February 12. A series of promotional images was released, depicting Onew as a doctor, the chemistry between Jin Goo and Kim Ji-won, the camaraderie between Jin Goo and Song Joong-ki, and the close friendship between Song Hye-kyo and Kim Ji-won. On February 17, 2016, KBS released posters featuring the four main characters and aired a preview immediately following the finale of the historical drama The Merchant: Gaekju 2015. A second promotional poster, featuring Song Joong-ki kissing Song Hye-kyo, was released the day before the broadcast premiere.

=== Broadcast ===
The release of Descendants of the Sun was postponed several times during production. (Note: Descendants of the Sun was tentatively scheduled for broadcast in March 2015, June 2015, May 2015, September 2015, December 2015, and February 2016.) The series eventually aired on Wednesdays and Thursdays on KBS2, taking over the time slot of The Merchant: Gaekju 2015. It ran from February 24 to April 14, 2016. After the main series concluded, KBS broadcast three special episodes from April 20 to 22, 2016, that featured production highlights and behind-the-scenes content. KBS and NEW agreed to a profit-sharing ratio of 40:60 for distribution and copyright revenues, a departure from the industry norm where broadcasters typically retain the majority of rights. Internationally, the rights were sold for approximately ₩2 billion to Japan, where the series aired on the CS Channel from June 21 to August 9, 2016, and was re-broadcast beginning on September 27. In Vietnam, DID TV partnered with Ho Chi Minh City Television to acquire the rights, and began airing a voice-over version on HTV2 on April 21, 2016. By late March 2016, broadcast rights had been sold to 32 countries.

=== Other media ===
iQIYI, a video-streaming affiliate of Baidu, purchased the exclusive rights to stream the show in China for approximately US$250,000 per episode, totaling about 40% of the production costs. By streaming on iQIYI alongside the South Korean broadcast, Descendants of the Sun became the first Korean drama to air simultaneously in South Korea and China. Due to strict content regulations in China, certain scenes were cut, including a three-minute fight sequence involving North Korean soldiers in the first episode. By September 2016, the series was made available for international streaming on Netflix.

On April 30, 2016, Wisdom House published a companion book titled Descendants of the Sun Photo Essay. Upon its release, several customers reported issues with poor print quality and unsatisfactory editorial layout, and some sought refunds. Wisdom House published a two-volume novelization of the series, edited by Son Hyun-kyung, on July 7, 2016. A director's cut edition of the series was released on DVD and Blu-ray in South Korea on February 14, 2017. Home video versions were released in international markets including Japan, Taiwan, Singapore, and Malaysia. While plans for a two-hour film adaptation and a sequel were announced, neither project has materialized.

== Reception ==
=== Commercial performance ===
In 2016, Descendants of the Sun was the highest-earning K-drama among Hallyu content. By March 23, 2016, the production had recouped its ₩13 billion production cost and earned over ₩10 billion in additional profit through export rights to 27 countries and various promotional activities. By the end of its run, the series was estimated to have generated ₩3.5 billion from product placement and approximately ₩9.6 billion from advertising sales, consisting of ₩6.6 billion during the initial broadcast and a projected ₩3 billion from reruns. The OST earned ₩12 billion in 2016, accounting for approximately 58% of the total soundtrack market sales for that year. The soundtrack achieved significant success in China; on the music platform KuGou alone, the package sold over 260,000 units, generating approximately ₩916 million in revenue by mid-April 2016.

=== Critical response ===
==== South Korea ====
Descendants of the Sun was a commercial and critical success in South Korea, praised for its acting, dialogue, and pre-recorded production style. Critics wrote that the series updated the "disaster melodrama" genre; Lee Eun-joo of the Seoul Shinmun observed that while Kim Eun-sook maintained her "Cinderella story" tropes, she refreshed the narrative with independent female characters and a professional military-medical context. Similarly, Kim Seon-young of Hankyoreh commended the show for blending espionage and medical drama to ground its romantic elements and appeal to a broader audience. Critics Jeong Deok-hyun and Yoon Seok-jin attributed its popularity to a fast-paced plot that replaced traditional love triangles with international conflict and natural disasters to drive tension.

Song Joong-ki's performance was widely cited as a key factor in the show's success. Ha Jae-geun remarked that the character's decisiveness resonated with viewers tired of typical romantic "push-and-pull" dynamics. Jeong Deok-hyun wrote that Song's post-military physical condition helped him convey the show's themes. Kim Seon-young described the protagonist as a polite, "mysterious" update to the writer's previous abrasive leads. Jeong Deok-hyun asserted that the character satisfied a public desire for a "true hero" following the Sewol ferry disaster. Kim Seon-young praised Kang Mo-yeon as an "advanced" female character defined by shared growth rather than class conflict, but observed that she became increasingly subordinate to the male lead as the plot progressed.

The series faced narrative criticism for retaining genre flaws such as poor realism and "vegetarian" romance. Yoon Seok-jin argued that the disaster and melodrama elements were "mechanically" repeated instead of naturally combined, which lowered the stakes. Cultural critic Jeong Hae-yoon condemned the "poverty of imagination" in the industry; she wrote that military realism was sacrificed for formulaic romance to secure ratings. Although music critic Kang Tae-gyu praised the match between visuals and music, he found the show's "completeness" lacking due to production choices aimed at the Chinese market. Bae Seon-yeong of Sports Chosun offered a harsher assessment and labeled it Kim Eun-sook's worst work due to poor narrative logic, excessive product placement, and unimpressive CGI.

==== International ====
Lakshana N. Palat of The Indian Express attributed the show's success to the "electrifying" chemistry between Song Joong-ki and Song Hye-kyo. She wrote that their ability to convey desire through glances elevated the series above "saccharine" romantic dramas. The Republican Post praised the leads. Marcus Goh of Yahoo! Life described the cinematography as a "visual feast", though he found the relationship between supporting characters Sang-hyun and Ja-ae more "organic" than the central romance.

Reviewers discussed the show's themes. Academic Chen Youjun argued that it moved beyond simple romance by focusing on the conflict between national duty and medical ethics. Foong Woei Wan of The Straits Times called it a "grown-up fantasy", writing that the protagonists were defined by professional duties rather than "superhero" tropes. Writing for Wen Wei Po, Yun Feiyang commended the series for blending realistic detail with "romantic illusion", and praised Kang Mo-yeon's "feminist consciousness" and proactive nature.

The plot drew criticism: Goh cited "ludicrous" obstacles, plot holes, and a "dated" musical score, and described Kang Mo-yeon as "shrill". Foong dismissed the finale as "ho-hum" filler that sacrificed tension for fan-pleasing reunions. Palat agreed, arguing that the show used "confusing fluff" to mask thin storytelling and that it sidelined promising supporting characters. Patrick Flamm criticized the omission of historical and United Nations context; he argued that portraying a US soldier as a villain was an assertion of South Korea's independent moral authority.

=== Viewership ===
By the time of its finale in April 2016, Descendants of the Sun had accumulated more than 2.67 billion views on iQIYI. Domestically, it became the first miniseries to surpass 30% in viewership ratings since MBC's Moon Embracing the Sun (2012), though its final ratings remained below the latter's peak of 42.2%. The drama set a precedent in an industry where ratings had been declining. At a time when ratings in the mid-10% range were considered a success, Descendants of the Sun recorded a final nationwide rating of 38.8% and a capital area rating of 41.6%. Its audience share reached 58% nationwide and 61% in the capital area.

Average TV viewership ratings (South Korea)
Ep.	Original broadcast date	Average audience share			
Ep.	Original broadcast date	TNMS		AGB Nielsen	
Ep.	Original broadcast date	Nationwide	Seoul	Nationwide	Seoul
1	February 24, 2016	12.6% (7th)	12.7% (4th)	14.3% (4th)	14.4% (4th)
2	February 25, 2016	13.5% (6th)	14.5% (4th)	15.5% (3rd)	16.0% (4th)
3	March 2, 2016	21.8% (2nd)	22.7% (1st)	23.4% (2nd)	24.6% (2nd)
4	March 3, 2016	22.9% (2nd)	23.5% (2nd)	24.1% (2nd)	25.1% (2nd)
5	March 9, 2016	24.6% (2nd)	26.3% (1st)	27.4% (1st)	29.2% (1st)
6	March 10, 2016	25.4% (2nd)	27.6% (1st)	28.5% (1st)	29.8% (1st)
7	March 16, 2016	27.0% (2nd)	28.9% (1st)	28.3% (1st)	30.1% (1st)
8	March 17, 2016	25.9% (2nd)	28.7% (1st)	28.8% (1st)	30.5% (1st)
9	March 23, 2016	29.7% (1st)	32.3% (1st)	30.4% (1st)	31.0% (1st)
10	March 24, 2016	28.8% (1st)	31.0% (1st)	31.6% (1st)	33.3% (1st)
11	March 30, 2016	29.1% (2nd)	31.3% (1st)	31.9% (1st)	33.5% (1st)
12	March 31, 2016	31.1% (1st)	33.9% (1st)	33.0% (1st)	34.3% (1st)
13	April 6, 2016	30.4% (1st)	33.7% (1st)	33.5% (1st)	35.0% (1st)
14	April 7, 2016	31.1% (1st)	33.5% (1st)	33.0% (1st)	35.6% (1st)
15	April 13, 2016	31.1% (1st)	35.6% (1st)	34.8% (1st)	37.5% (1st)
16	April 14, 2016	35.3% (1st)	40.5% (1st)	38.8% (1st)	41.6% (1st)
Average		26.3%	28.5%	28.6%	30.1%
Specials
1	April 20, 2016	15.3% (5th)	16.6% (4th)	17.7% (4th)	19.5% (3rd)
2	April 21, 2016	12.3% (6th)	13.9% (5th)	13.6% (5th)	14.7% (5th)
3	April 22, 2016	10.9% (7th)	11.8% (6th)	12.2% (5th)	13.2% (6th)
Blue denotes the lowest rating, red denotes the highest rating, and the numbers in parentheses denote the show's rank.

=== Awards and nominations ===
At the 52nd Baeksang Arts Awards, Descendants of the Sun won the Grand Prize for Television and received nominations including Best Drama, Best Director, Best Actor, Best Actress, and Best Scriptwriter. It received Best Drama at the 9th Korea Drama Awards. The drama won several accolades at the 2016 KBS Drama Awards, where lead actors Song Joong-ki and Song Hye-kyo shared the Grand Prize. The series won Best Drama at the 43rd Korean Broadcasting Grand Prize and the Grand Prize for Excellence in Production from the Korea Communications Commission Broadcasting Awards. Both lead actors were awarded Presidential Commendations at the Korean Popular Culture and Arts Awards. Internationally, the drama won Best Drama Series at the 21st Asian Television Awards and Excellent Korean Drama at the 11th Seoul International Drama Awards.

=== Criticisms and controversies ===
The series was criticized for blatant product placement (PPL). After the plot returned to South Korea in episode 13, critics and viewers argued that the frequent appearance of products, including red ginseng, almonds, and automobiles, felt forced and disrupted audience immersion, particularly during high-stakes scenes. (Note: Sources from Newsen, Sports Seoul, Sports Dong-a, and Sports Q.) The Korea Communications Standards Commission (KCSC) reviewed the matter. Kim Won-seok denied political intentions regarding the show's perceived militarism; he said his goal was to depict a country's response to disasters. Kim acknowledged that PPL was not integrated into the storyline as seamlessly as intended.

After the premiere, viewers complained that loud background music obscured dialogue; producer Ham Young-hoon pledged to investigate and adjust the audio balance. In episode 8, a scene in which the character Seo Dae-young swears drew debate. Although some found the language contextually appropriate, the KCSC issued an administrative "recommendation" for violating broadcast language regulations. In Vietnam, the show's popularity sparked debate over South Korea's historical role in the Vietnam War. While one journalist argued that the show ignored past war crimes committed by Korean troops, many viewers countered that the drama focused on a fictional UN peacekeeping mission unrelated to historical conflicts.

Viewers identified several unrealistic plot points, such as a helicopter landing on a hospital roof to retrieve a captain, physically impossible car stunts, incorrect CPR techniques, and a protagonist disobeying military orders. South Korean men who completed their military service described the drama as "far removed from reality" and compared its inaccuracies to "talking about science while watching a cartoon". Park Young-woong of Sports Q criticized Lee Chi-hoon's story arc as "forced". He noted that viewers struggled to empathize with the character being labeled a coward for failing a rescue under impossible circumstances.

== Legacy ==
=== Economic and cultural impact ===
Descendants of the Sun had a substantial economic impact in South Korea in 2016. The Export–Import Bank of Korea estimated it generated ₩1 trillion, while other analyses, accounting for intangible benefits like national branding, placed its value at ₩3 trillion. The series shifted Chinese consumer behavior; viewers' demand for health supplements and fashion items seen in the series drove an increase in online direct sales and tourism spending in early 2016. After the 2015 lifting of a decade-long export ban, its depiction of samgyetang was credited with boosting the dish's popularity and exports in China.

The series benefited the Chinese streaming platform iQIYI, where paid subscriptions rose from 10 million to 15 million during the show's run. Chinese media estimated iQIYI earned at least ₩35 billion in revenue from the series. Sales of placed products surged in South Korea and China; (Note: Examples include Cheong Kwan Jang's Extract Everytime red ginseng; a Thom Browne striped shirt; Amorepacific's Laneige two-tone lip bar; the Hyundai Tucson; and the fast-food franchise Subway, which saw an increase in both sales and franchise inquiries.) as a result, major duty-free, cosmetic, and airline conglomerates competed to hire the lead actors as models. Some affiliated beauty brands reported 50% sales increases, and the products sold out globally. The series was used for national branding; lead actor Song Joong-ki became the face of international tourism campaigns, and former filming sites in Taebaek and the Paju DMZ became tourist destinations.

Song Joong-ki's popularity in China led fans to refer to him as the "Nation's Husband". The Chinese Ministry of Public Safety issued a warning on Weibo regarding "Song Joong-ki lovesickness" and noted that extreme obsession had caused domestic disputes. The People's Liberation Army newspaper praised the series as a "great national service advertisement" and an effective recruitment tool. Thai Prime Minister Prayut Chan-o-cha commended the drama for inspiring patriotism and suggested state support for similar "socially beneficial" productions. President Park Geun-hye remarked that the series stimulated foreign interest in Korean culture, and she later called South Korean UN peacekeepers in South Sudan the "real descendants of the sun".

=== Industry impact ===
Descendants of the Sun is the first major Korean drama to center on peacekeeping operations, and it portrays South Korea as an active agent in global foreign policy. This marked a shift from earlier military series such as Iris (2009) and Athena: Goddess of War (2010–2011), which focused on the inter-Korean conflict. The drama symbolizes South Korea's emergence as a middle power by intertwining a fictional mission with national identity. Because of its commercial success, the series became a frequent subject of academic analysis, particularly in China, where researchers examined its use of television to project soft power.

The production moved away from domestic market constraints and toward international co-production. The series demonstrated that simultaneous broadcasting in China and South Korea could maximize revenues by guiding viewers to legitimate platforms and facilitating piracy crackdowns. As the first major success of the 100% pre-production model, it proved the viability of a strategy required by Chinese censorship. This success caused a surge of pre-produced titles aimed at the Chinese market, including Uncontrollably Fond, Moon Lovers: Scarlet Heart Ryeo, Saimdang, Memoir of Colors, and Hwarang: The Poet Warrior Youth. However, subsequent pre-produced series often underperformed, which spawned the industry term "pre-production jinx". These later dramas could not keep up with current trends and suffered from seasonal discrepancies, such as winter scenes airing in the summer; Descendants of the Sun remained a rare exception.

Following the drama's success, Netflix announced plans to develop original Korean content and secured international distribution rights for the series. Lead actors Song Joong-ki and Song Hye-kyo, who had initially denied dating rumors, announced their engagement on July 5, 2017. In response, the KBS Drama cable channel aired a two-day marathon of the series. The couple divorced on July 22, 2019.

=== Adaptation ===
In July 2016, a Chinese film adaptation produced by Huace Film & TV and directed by Zhang Yibai was announced, but it was never produced. In the Philippines, the series was adapted as Descendants of the Sun: The Philippine Adaptation, which aired from February 10 to December 25, 2020. The cast included Jennylyn Mercado, Dingdong Dantes, Rocco Nacino, and Jasmine Curtis-Smith. The Philippine adaptation won the Most Popular Foreign Drama of the Year award at the 15th Seoul International Drama Awards.

A 48-episode Vietnamese adaptation aired from September 29 to November 19, 2018. Directed by Trần Bửu Lộc, the remake starred Song Luân, Khả Ngân, Hữu Vi, and Cao Thái Hà. The Vietnamese series received mixed reviews during its run. The Vietnamese Ministry of National Defence requested that broadcaster VTC correct inaccuracies in the series regarding the etiquette, regulations, and imagery of the People's Army of Vietnam. The broadcasting rights for the Vietnamese adaptation were acquired by iQIYI and Netflix, which re-edited the series into 24 one-hour episodes.

An Indonesian remake directed by Hanung Bramantyo and starring Reza Rahadian and Dian Sastrowardoyo began filming in April 2026.
