= Ray Mancini vs. Kim Duk-koo =

Boxing match

- Date: November 13, 1982
- Venue: Caesars Palace, Paradise, Nevada, U.S.
- Title on the line: WBA Lightweight title

Tale of the tape
Boxer	Ray Mancini	Kim Duk-koo
Nickname	Boom Boom	
Hometown	Youngstown, Ohio, U.S.	Seoul, South Korea
Purse	$250,000	$20,000
Pre-fight record	24–1 (19 KO)	17–1–1 (8 KO)
Age	21 years, 8 months	27 years, 3 months
Height	5 ft 4 1/2 in (164 cm)	5 ft 6 in (168 cm)
Weight	135 lb (61 kg)	134 1/4 lb (61 kg)
Style	Orthodox	Southpaw
Recognition	WBA; Lightweight Champion	WBA; No. 1 Ranked Lightweight; OPBF; Lightweight Champion

Result
- Mancini wins via 14th-round knockout

Ray Mancini vs. Kim Duk-koo was a professional boxing match contested on November 13, 1982, for the WBA lightweight title.

== Background ==
Following Ray Mancini's first successful defense of the WBA lightweight title against number-one contender Ernesto España on July 24, 1982, in his native Ohio, negotiations for his next title defense began in early September with the date scheduled for that fall. South Korean fighter Kim Duk-koo (anglicized as "Deuk Koo Kim" or "Deukoo Kim" in the United States), who had been the number-two ranked lightweight behind España, was expected to be Mancini's next challenger provided the WBA upgrade Kim to number-one in their lightweight rankings, thus allowing Mancini to fulfill his mandatory challenger requirements. Two weeks after plans for the Mancini–Kim had been announced and by which time the WBA had officially installed Kim as their number-one ranked lightweight contender, promoter Bob Arum confirmed the fight would happen on November 13, 1982, at Caesars Palace.

Though the 17–1–1 Kim was in the midst of 16-fight unbeaten streak, he had never fought outside his native country and was virtually unknown in the United States, causing the vast majority of the media to overlook him and instead ask Mancini about the Aaron Pryor–Alexis Argüello fight, which was to take place the day before the Mancini–Kim bout, at a pre-fight press conference as Mancini was rumored to pursue a fight with the winner of that fight should he get past Kim. Mancini, however, deflected any talk of his next fight and heaped praise on Kim as a legit contender, stating "nothing will come out of the Arguello-Pryor fight if I don't get past Kim. And Kim is the worst type of guy I could be fighting. He's coming in here hungry and determined, plus, he's the No. 1 contender. You can't come up with a better opponent than that." Kim, a major underdog, said through his interpreter, praised Mancini as a "very strong opponent" but nevertheless was confident, telling the media that Mancini had a "50-50 chance" of defeating him.

Prior to the fight, Kim taped a sign on hotel room lampshade that read "Kill or be killed" in his native language, though the phrase actually translated to "live or die". Kim, in conversation with his fiancé Young-mi Lee, reportedly stated "either he (Mancini) dies, or I die."

== Fight Details ==
Mancini and Kim went back-and-forth for the majority of the bout with both fighters trading blows to the head and each absorbing a considerable amount of punishment, especially Mancini, who badly injured his left hand in the third round after landing a hook to Kim's head which caused it to bruise and swell and whose left eye also began to swell early on after absorbing numerous blows from Kim. With the bout still hanging in the balance going into the tenth round, Mancini seized control for the remainder of the fight as Kim tired and frequently resorted to clinching Mancini which eventually caused referee Richard Green to deduct a point in the tenth for holding and hitting. The 11th, 12th and 13th rounds were all controlled by Mancini, who landed a 39-punch barrage on Kim early in the 13th, though Kim was able to survive the round. In the beginning of the 14th, Mancini charged Kim and sent him crashing down to the canvas after landing consecutive right hands to Kim's head. Though clearly hurt, Kim nevertheless was able to use the ropes to pull himself back up to his feet, but Green stopped the fight and Mancini was named the winner by knockout 19 seconds into the round.

== Death of Kim ==
Shortly after the fight ended, Kim collapsed and subsequently fell into a coma. Ringside physician Donald Romeo immediately summoned for a stretcher and Kim was carried from the ring and rushed to nearby Desert Springs Hospital where he underwent two hours of emergency surgery performed by Lonnie Hammargren after undergoing a brain scan which revealed Kim had suffered a subdural hematoma. Though the surgery successfully removed the clot from Kim's brain, Hammargren stated that Kim had suffered terminal brain damage and did not expect him to survive. Kim was then placed on life support in the hospital's intensive care unit as Hammargren awaited the arrival of Kim's mother Yang sun-Nyo and older brother Kim kun-Ryong. On November 18, 1982, five days after the fight, Kim was pronounced dead with his mother making the decision to donate his kidneys so her son would experience "everlasting life in this world." She would make a statement to the press about her decision to remove her son from life support: "I made up my mind to transplant his organs to other people. The American doctors and nurses have done their best to rejuvenate my son. In spite of all our efforts, we cannot rejuvenate him. If I continue to let the doctors and staff supply medical treatment, it is a burden to them."

== Aftermath ==
Devastated by the incident, Mancini mulled retirement, explaining "No matter what you get paid, millions, maybe, it's a cheap price for your life. I have to wonder if I want that. I'm not talking retirement now but I have to decide if I want to go on." Mancini would cancel a title defense scheduled to take place against Roberto Elizondo in Italy the following month as his attorney explained Mancini needed several months to contemplate whether or not he would fight again. He would announce his return in mid-January the following year, defeating George Feeney on February 6, 1983, in Italy.

Kim's death would lead to the eventual end to 15-round championship fights in boxing. In December, less than a month after the Mancini–Kim fight, the WBC announced that they would reduce their title fights to 12-rounds effective January 1, 1983. The WBA, which had sanctioned the Mancini–Kim bout, followed suit in October 1987. The last holdout, the IBF voted to switch to 12-round fights in June 1988.

== Legacy ==
The San Francisco-based band Sun Kil Moon's first album, Ghosts of the Great Highway, includes a fifteen-minute track titled "Duk Koo Kim" which references the Mancini fight. The song was included in a 2011 article titled "Sports Illustrated's Ultimate Playlist".

The Warren Zevon song "Boom Boom Mancini" references the fight.

== Fight card ==
Confirmed bouts:

Weight Class	Weight		vs.		Method	Round	Notes
Lightweight	135 lbs.	Ray Mancini (c)	def.	Kim Duk-koo	KO	14/15	^{note 1}
Cruiserweight	190 lbs.	Randy Stephens	def.	Grover Robinson	TKO	6/10
Super Lightweight	140 lbs.	Robin Blake	def.	Ricardo Jimenez	UD	10
Cruiserweight	190 lbs.	Henry Hearns	def.	Parnell Fairley	UD	8
Welterweight	147 lbs.	Jack Alvarez	def.	Mike Castronova	TKO	3/6
Welterweight	147 lbs.	Luis Santana	def.	Chuck Peralta	TKO	4/6
Bantamweight	118 lbs.	Tony Montoya	def.	Jorge Ramirez	UD	4

^Note 1 For WBA Lightweight Title

== Broadcasting ==
Country	Broadcaster
United States	CBS

Preceded by vs. Ernesto España	Ray Mancini's bouts 13 November 1982	Succeeded by vs. George Feeney
Preceded by vs. Tadao Ishido	Kim Duk-koo's bouts 13 November 1982	Deceased
