= Ray Mancini vs. Orlando Romero =

Boxing match

- Date: September 15, 1983
- Venue: Madison Square Garden, New York City, New York, U.S.
- Title(s) on the line: WBA Lightweight title

Tale of the tape
Boxer	Ray Mancini	Orlando Romero
Nickname	Boom Boom	Romerito
Hometown	Youngstown, Ohio, U.S.	Trujillo, Peru
Purse	$600,000	$100,000
Pre-fight record	26–1 (20 KO)	30–0–1 (12 KO)
Age	22 years, 6 months	24 years, 2 months
Height	5 ft 4 1/2 in (164 cm)	5 ft 6 1/2 in (169 cm)
Weight	135 lb (61 kg)	134 3/4 lb (61 kg)
Style	Orthodox	Southpaw
Recognition	WBA; Lightweight Champion	WBA; No. 1 Ranked Lightweight

Result
- Mancini wins via 9th-round knockout

Ray Mancini vs. Orlando Romero was a professional boxing match contested on September 15, 1983, for the WBA lightweight title.

== Background ==
WBA lightweight champion Ray Mancini had returned to boxing in February 1983 with a 10-round unanimous decision victory over George Feeney after a brief hiatus following his previous fight against Kim Duk-koo which resulted in Kim's death.

Shortly following his win over Feeney, it as announced that Mancini's next title defense was planned to take place against Kenny "Bang Bang" Bogner at the Sun City resort and casino in Bophuthatswana, South Africa on May 27, 1983, in a Bob Arum-promoted event dubbed "The Chairman and the Champs", that would see both the Mancini–Bogner lightweight title fight and a welterweight title fight between Davey Moore and Roberto Durán paired with a concert by Frank Sinatra. However, one month before the event was to take place, Mancini, who had been training for the bout in South Africa, broke his collarbone after his sparring partner Teddy Hatfield landed a blow to Mancini's shoulder, resulting in the event's cancellation.

The WBA, claiming that Mancini had not yet disclosed the severity of his injury to them, briefly threatened to strip Mancini of his title, but allowed Mancini a 6-month grace period after which he would be obligated to face their number-one ranked lightweight contender, who at the time was undefeated Peruvian fighter Orlando Romero. In late July, Mancini reached an agreement with Romero, with the bout set for September 15, 1983, at Madison Square Garden. Mancini, who had not yet recovered from his injury when the fight was made official, called the fight the "most important" of his life. When Mancini did begin his training at Grossinger's Resort in the Catskill Mountains, he hired two Penthouse models, Sheila Kennedy and Cody Carmack, to accompany him and attend his training sessions. Mancini explained that he did so because Kennedy and Carmack got his "adrenaline up before I start to train and I find it very good."

Though Romero sported an impressive 30–0–1 record, he had never fought outside his native Peru and came into the fight as a considerable underdog who was not expected to give Mancini much trouble. Romero's camp hired future two-time world champion Vinny Pazienza as a sparring partner for Romero. The then-20-year old Pazienza, who had only five fights as a professional, claimed he was dismissed from Romero's camp after only sparring with him for one round after "bullying" and "picking apart" Romero, who Pazienza called "weak." Manini had a lot riding on his fight with Romero as he had already agreed to a multi-million dollar fight with two-division world champion Bobby Chacon set for the following January.

== Fight Details ==
Though it was thought that Mancini would cruise to an easy victory, Romero proved to be tougher opponent then expected. Mancini appeared sluggish after his seven-month layoff and struggled both offensively and defensively through eight rounds as Romero was effective using both his jab and his left hand counterpunch, which opened a cut above Mancini's left eyebrow in the eighth round and caused the eye itself to swell nearly shut by the end of the fight. Still, Mancini did just enough to carry a narrow lead on two of the judge's scorecards (79–77 and 77–76) while the third had the fight a draw. With the fight still up very much up for grabs going into the ninth round, Mancini caught Romero suddenly with a left hook flush to the head that sent Romero down flat on his back. The dazed Romero slowly attempted to get back up but he was unable to get back to his feet in time as referee Tony Perez's counted him out at 1:56 of the round.

== Fight card ==
Confirmed bouts:

Weight Class	Weight		vs.		Method	Round	Notes
Lightweight	135 lbs.	Ray Mancini (c)	def.	Orlando Romero	KO	9/15	^{note 1}
Lightweight	135 lbs.	Charlie Brown	def.	Alfredo Escalera	UD	10
Super Lightweight	140 lbs.	Nino La Rocca	def.	Jerry Cheatham	UD	10
Heavyweight	200+ lbs.	Rodney Frazier	def.	Mike Perkins	TKO	4/6
Light Welterweight	140 lbs.	Joe Frazier Jr.	def.	Rick Stinnie	KO	4/6
Heavyweight	200+ lbs.	Steve Floch	def.	Charles Arnold	TKO	5/6
Heavyweight	200+ lbs.	Carlos Hernandez	def.	Tui Aloha	KO	1/6

^Note 1 For WBA Lightweight Title

== Broadcasting ==
Country	Broadcaster
United States	CBS

Preceded by vs. George Feeney	Ray Mancini's bouts 15 September 1983	Succeeded by vs. Johnny Torres
Preceded by vs. Julio Jorge Melone	Orlando Romero's bouts 15 September 1983	Succeeded by vs. Benedicto Villablanca
