= Mitch Halpern =

American boxing referee (1967–2000)

- Halpern as he was being announced before the start of Tyson–Holyfield I, November 9, 1996

Personal information
- Nationality: American
- Born: Mitchell Howard Halpern; July 14, 1967
- Died: August 20, 2000 (aged 33) Las Vegas, Nevada, US

Sport
- Sport: Boxing
- Updated on July 29, 2012

Mitchell Howard Halpern (July 14, 1967 – August 20, 2000) was an American boxing referee who officiated some of the sport's biggest matches.

== Early career ==
Halpern began his career in March 1991 and went on to referee 87 championship fights and hundreds of non-title fights around the world. Mitch also volunteered for a foundation that grants wishes for children that are suffering with life-threatening medical conditions.

Halpern was trained and mentored by veteran boxing referee Richard Steele. "I taught him everything I knew," said Steele. "He took what I had taught him, and with his great natural ability, made himself a great referee." Marc Ratner, who was the executive director of the Nevada State Athletic Commission during the time that Halpern was a referee commented, "There are certain officials in certain sports who are naturals...Mitch has a real feel for it."

Steele said that Halpern approached him one night after Steele had just finished refereeing a fight and told him that he wanted to be a referee. Steele recounted, "I have had numerous people come to me and say that. I always tell them, 'I will meet you at the gym Monday.' He was there Monday. Most other guys never show up. He worked hard. He worked harder than anyone I had ever seen. He wanted to be the best."

As part of the learning process to become a world-class boxing ref, Halpern asked Steele to get in the ring with him and box. They ended up boxing every day. Steele remembered, "He wanted to know how it felt to have a bloody nose and be hurt...He wanted to get the fullness out of being a boxer so he could make the right decisions...It really helped him to be the best referee of all time."

== Tyson–Holyfield I ==
Halpern was assigned many of the highest-profile fights in Nevada. These included the first Mike Tyson–Evander Holyfield fight for the WBA Heavyweight title at the MGM Grand Garden in 1996 in which Holyfield won by TKO in the 11th round in an upset. The fight was voted by Ring magazine as both Fight of the Year and Upset of the Year. Others beside boxing insiders began to take note of Halpern during this fight. Marc Ratner recounted: "...Until Mitch got the first Mike Tyson-Evander Holyfield fight, nobody knew how good he was."

Halpern was scheduled to referee Holyfield–Tyson II, what would come to be known as the infamous "Bite Fight", but Tyson's co-manager, John Horne vehemently opposed. Officially, Tyson's camp did not cite any specific reason to The Nevada State Athletic Commission, only arguing that they wanted a fresh slate. Halpern commented at the time, "The day a fighter can dictate what happens in a fight, I'm gone, because then I don't have any authority anyway."

The NSAC stood firm with a 4–1 vote and were not willing to remove Halpern (whom one sports writer referred to as "the unwilling centerpiece of a manufactured controversy"). The day before the fight was to occur, Halpern voluntarily withdrew. In an interview with sports reporter Ron Futrell, Halpern explained his reasoning: "As an official, you don't ever want to be the center of attention, and that's what was happening. These are two great fighters, this is a big, big fight, and I didn't want to take away from that..." Mills Lane was subsequently chosen to be the referee.

A little over 4 months later on November 8, 1997, Halpern refereed the rematch between Evander Holyfield and Michael Moorer in which Moorer lost by TKO in the 8th round. Holyfield retained his WBA title, while gaining the IBF Heavyweight belt.

== Other bouts ==
Halpern refereed the match between Gabriel Ruelas and Jimmy Garcia for the WBC super featherweight title on May 6, 1995. Ruelas won the fight by TKO, but the match is mostly remembered because Garcia died in a hospital two weeks later from brain damage sustained in the fight.

In a New York Times article, Ruelas explained that even when he was pounding Garcia with punches, Garcia maintained a composure to not act hurt, and the fight continued on for eleven rounds, with Garcia's father prodding him on in his corner. The doctor and Halpern inspected Garcia in the corner after the 10th round and found him coherent enough to continue, but the fight was stopped by Halpern in the next round. Although Garcia walked back to his corner, minutes later he collapsed and had to be taken from the ring on a stretcher.

It is not clear what effect Garcia's death had upon Halpern. Physician-at-ringside, Edwin "Flip" Homansky, who often worked title matches that Halpern refereed, said "Mitch transcended the sport in that he truly cared about the fighters." Halpern's experience was similar to boxing referee Richard Green — who officiated the WBA Lightweight title match between Ray Mancini and Duk Koo Kim in 1982. Kim was knocked down in the 14th round but got up to beat the ten count. When Green spotted a worrisome dazed look in Kim's eyes, he stopped the match. Kim had sustained serious brain trauma and was carried out of the ring on a stretcher. He died four days later (Green died from a self-inflicted gunshot wound to the head about a year after the Mancini–Kim fight).

Halpern was the referee for several notable bouts in 1999: the Lennox Lewis–Evander Holyfield rematch at the Thomas & Mack Center in which Lennox was the winner by unanimous decision; the Oscar De La Hoya–Félix Trinidad welterweight championship fight at Mandalay Bay in which Trinidad won by majority decision (billed as the Fight of the Millennium, the fight set a pay-per-view record for a non-heavyweight fight); also in 1999, Halpern officiated the De La Hoya–Ike Quartey fight in which De La Hoya won by split decision.

Halpern was also referee for the first of three meetings between Erik Morales and Marco Antonio Barrera.

== Film ==
Halpern played a referee in the 1999 film, Play it to the Bone.

== Reputation ==
Before his untimely death in 2000, Mitch Halpern was considered "a rising star" in the sport. Veteran boxing referee Joe Cortez remarked that he considered Halpern one of boxing's top referees — which appeared to be a common sentiment in the industry. One boxing promoter commented that Halpern "never lost control in the ring". Achieving this requires that a referee maintain respect from the fighters and their corners, and is not swayed into not doing the right thing by politics or audience sentiment. It also involves intelligence to "read a fight" and understand the psychology of a fight's dynamics, which moves very quickly. Dr. Elias Ghanem, who was chairman of the Nevada State Athletic Commission when Halpern died, characterized him as "a real brave referee."

== Death ==
Halpern died on August 20, 2000, in his south Las Vegas home from a self-inflicted gunshot wound to the head. He was 33 years old. Detectives at the scene did not give details, except to say that there were two other people in the house at the time. Halpern had been engaged to be married when he died. Many boxing insiders upon hearing of Halpern's death expressed shock because Halpern had a reputation for being collected and not impulsive. For instance, boxing promoter and president of Top Rank, Bob Arum, said that he was "flabbergasted": "I don't think he had an enemy. He was such a stable, rational personality — cool under pressure, unflappable; adding, "A lot of people, myself included, felt he was the best around. Nobody ever questioned his integrity."
