= Emanuel Steward =

American boxer, trainer, and commentator

- Steward in Dusseldorf, Germany, March 2012

Personal information
- Nickname: Manny
- Born: July 7, 1944 Bottom Creek, West Virginia, U.S.
- Died: October 25, 2012 (aged 68) Chicago, Illinois, U.S.

Boxing career

Emanuel "Manny" Steward (July 7, 1944 – October 25, 2012) was an American boxer, trainer, and commentator for HBO Boxing. Known as "the godfather of Detroit boxing," Steward trained 41 world champion fighters throughout his career, most notably Thomas Hearns, through the famous Kronk Gym and later heavyweights Lennox Lewis and Wladimir Klitschko. Emanuel trained over two dozen boxers who turned out to be champions in the course of his career. He is arguably the greatest boxing trainer of all time. His heavyweight fighters had a combined record of 34–2–1 in title fights. He was an inductee of the International Boxing Hall Of Fame, and the World Boxing Hall of Fame. Steward was also known for his charity work in Detroit, Michigan, helping youth to attain an education.

== Life and career ==
Steward was born in Bottom Creek, West Virginia, but, by the age of 12, he had moved with his mother to Detroit, Michigan, after she divorced his father, who was a coal miner. After moving to Detroit, he worked briefly in the auto industry before eventually going to Brewster Recreation Center, where Joe Louis and Eddie Futch trained. Steward began an amateur boxing career there. He compiled a record of 94 wins and 3 losses as an amateur boxer, including winning the 1963 national Golden Gloves tournament in the bantamweight division.

In 1971, Steward took his half brother, James Steward, to the nearby Kronk Gym, a hot-bed for amateur boxers in the 1970s, and became a part-time coach there. Steward trained many of the nation's top amateurs. He eventually translated his success with amateurs into a career training championship-level professional fighters.

On March 2, 1980, Hilmer Kenty became Steward's first world champion by knocking out world lightweight champ Ernesto España. Steward achieved his most notable early success with welterweight Thomas Hearns, whom he changed from a light hitting boxer into one of the most devastating punchers in boxing history. Hearns became one of Steward's most successful and popular fighters, fighting Sugar Ray Leonard, knocking out Roberto Durán, and challenging undisputed middleweight champion Marvelous Marvin Hagler. He was well known for his outgoing personality and endless energy. Fighters also loved him for his generosity and for the father-figure role he often played in their lives. He would frequently let fighters live with him, mentoring and parenting them. In addition, he was very generous and was known for being a father figure. Steward had a 94-3 record and won a 1963 National Golden Gloves title as a bantamweight. Even though he fought, his main passion was training. He began coaching amateur fighters as a part-time coach in 1971 at the Kronk Gym, which later became famous for producing so many champions.

=== Death ===
Steward died on October 25, 2012, after undergoing surgery for diverticulitis. He was 68. Colon cancer was subsequently reported as a contributing factor to his death.

== Honors ==
- Elected into the International Boxing Hall of Fame
- Elected into the World Boxing Hall of Fame

== Kronk Gym ==
Kronk Gym became a property of Steward's, who was also famous for his collection of Rolls-Royce cars and mansions. He opened a branch of the gym in Tucson, Arizona, and started an association with the Dodge Theater in Phoenix to present boxing undercards once a month.

Steward often turned up the thermostat to make boxers so uncomfortable that some would claim that even the walls would sweat.

== Fighters trained ==
Among the world champions and top rated contenders who trained or sought Steward's guidance at some point of their careers were:

- (United Kingdom) Dennis Andries
- (United States) Johnathon Banks
- (Puerto Rico) Wilfred Benítez
- (United States) Jesse Benavides
- (United States) Mark Breland
- (United States) Cornelius Bundrage
- (United States) Oba Carr
- (Mexico) Julio César Chávez
- (Puerto Rico) Kermit Cintron
- (Puerto Rico) Miguel Cotto
- (United States) Chad Dawson
- (United States) Oscar De La Hoya
- (United States) Domonique Dolton
- (United Kingdom) Tyson Fury
- (Cuba) Yuriorkis Gamboa
- (Mexico) Miguel Ángel González
- (United States) Mickey Goodwin
- (United Kingdom) Naseem Hamed
- (United States) Thomas Hearns
- (United States) Evander Holyfield
- (United States) John David Jackson
- (United States) Hilmer Kenty
- (Norway) Ole Klemetsen
- (Ukraine) Wladimir Klitschko
- (Republic of Ireland) Andy Lee
- (United States) William "Caveman" Lee
- (United Kingdom) Lennox Lewis
- (United States) Oliver McCall
- (Jamaica) Mike McCallum
- (United States) Gerald McClellan
- (United States) Milton McCrory
- (United States) Steve McCrory
- (United States) Michael Moorer
- (Guyana) Andrew Murray
- (United States) Jimmy Paul
- (United States) Aaron Pryor
- (Germany) Graciano Rocchigiani
- (Lebanon) Tarick Salmaci
- (Canada) Adonis Stevenson
- (United States) Jermain Taylor
- (United States) Duane Thomas
- (United States) James Toney
- (Canada) Syd Vanderpool
- (United States) Ricky Womack

== Legacy and KRONK revival ==
Following Steward's death in 2012, Kronk Gym operated from a facility on Mettetal Street until 2020 before closing due to flood damage. In 2025, a new ownership group acquired the KRONK trademarks and reopened the gym in the historic Brewster-Wheeler Recreation Center at 670 Wilkins Street, Detroit — the same building where Steward himself began his boxing career as a youth. The revival was announced alongside Detroit Mayor Mike Duggan on June 4, 2025, and the gym officially reopened on December 10, 2025, with Johnathon Banks — whom Steward personally designated as his training successor — serving as head trainer.
