= Ganigan =

Ganigan may refer to:

- Andrew Ganigan (1952-2012), American boxer
- Ganigan López (born 1981), Mexican boxer
