= Cattouse =

Cattouse is a surname. Notable people with the surname include:

- Kaya Cattouse (born 1990), Belizean cyclist
- Michelle Cattouse (died 2008), Belizean shooting victim
- Nadia Cattouse (1924–2024), British actress, singer, and songwriter
- Ray Cattouse (born 1952), British boxer
- Sean Cattouse (born 1988), American football player
