= Ray Mancini vs. Ernesto España =

Boxing match

Back Where It Started
- Date: July 24, 1982
- Venue: Mollenkopf Stadium, Warren, Ohio, U.S.
- Title(s) on the line: WBA Lightweight title

Tale of the tape
Boxer	Ray Mancini	Ernesto España
Nickname	Boom Boom	
Hometown	Youngstown, Ohio, U.S.	La Flor, Venezuela
Purse	$200,000	$250,000
Pre-fight record	23–1 (18 KO)	35–4 (30 KO)
Age	21 years, 4 months	27 years, 8 months
Height	5 ft 4 1/2 in (164 cm)	5 ft 11 in (180 cm)
Weight	135 lb (61 kg)	134 lb (61 kg)
Style	Orthodox	Orthodox
Recognition	WBA; Lightweight Champion	WBA; No. 1 Ranked Lightweight

Result
- Mancini wins via 6th-round technical knockout

Ray Mancini vs. Ernesto España, billed as Back Where It Started, was a professional boxing match contested on July 24, 1982, for the WBA lightweight title.

== Background ==
Prior to the Arturo Frias–Ray Mancini lightweight title on May 8, 1982, Mancini's promoter Bob Arum paid the WBA's number-one ranked lightweight contender Ernesto España, who was Frias' mandatory challenger, $50,000 to step aside and allow the Frias–Mancini bout to continue forward on the basis that España would face the winner within 60 days. With Mancini defeating Frias via first-round knockout, he and España came to terms less than a week after to face each other on July 25 of that year.

Initially announced by CBS, who was broadcasting the fight, to take place in the Las Vegas Valley, Mancini's manager confirmed that the bout would in fact happen in one of three venues; either the Richfield Coliseum or Mollenkopf Stadium, both in Mancini's native Ohio and close to his hometown of Youngstown, or the Civic Arena in nearby Pittsburgh, Pennsylvania. It was announced in June, that Mollenkopf Stadium, the venue closest to Youngstown, was chosen.

== Fight Details ==
The fight proved to be a mismatch as Mancini dominated España through six rounds, winning every round on all three official scorecards and landing punches almost at will as España struggled to land any sustained offense or defend himself from the aggressive Mancini who frequently landed blows that went unanswered. España was clearly exhausted and struggled during the latter rounds of the bout but managed to make it to the very end of the sixth round despite taking heavy abuse in the prior rounds. The fight would come to an end when Mancini staggered España with a left hook with around 30 seconds remaining, putting him on wobbly legs and forcing him hold on to Mancini to stay upright. As the round was coming to a close, Mancini had España backed up against the ropes and landed several hooks to a nearly defenseless España's head. Though España tried to escape, Mancini followed with several more blows to España's head as referee Stanley Christodoulou stopped the fight with one second left in the round, giving Mancini the victory by technical knockout.

== Fight card ==
Confirmed bouts:

Weight Class	Weight		vs.		Method	Round	Notes
Lightweight	135 lbs.	Ray Mancini (c)	def.	Ernesto España	TKO	6/15	^{note 1}
Cruiserweight	190 lbs.	Randy Stephens	def.	Rick Enis	RTD	9/12	^{note 2}
Lightweight	135 lbs.	Harry Arroyo	def.	Kevin Austin	TKO	5/8
Light Middleweight	154 lbs.	Gary Coats	def.	Lenny Villers	KO	5/8
Middleweight	160 lbs.	Rusty Rosenberger	def.	Lewis Jones	PTS	6/6
Welterweight	147 lbs.	Mike Castronova	def.	Mike Essett	UD	6/6

^Note 1 For WBA Lightweight Title
^Note 2 For Vacant Ohio Athletic Commission Cruiserweight Title

== Broadcasting ==
Country	Broadcaster
United States	CBS

Preceded by vs. Arturo Frias	Ray Mancini's bouts 24 July 1982	Succeeded by vs. Kim Duk-koo
Preceded by vs. Arturo Frias	Ernesto España's bouts 24 July 1982	Succeeded by vs. Rafael Williams
