= Arturo Frias vs. Ray Mancini =

Boxing match

- Date: May 8, 1982
- Venue: The Aladdin, Paradise, Nevada, U.S.
- Title(s) on the line: WBA Lightweight title

Tale of the tape
Boxer	Arturo Frias	Ray Mancini
Nickname	Art	Boom Boom
Hometown	San Diego, California, U.S.	Youngstown, Ohio, U.S.
Purse	$175,000	$100,000
Pre-fight record	24–1 (7 KO)	22–1 (17 KO)
Age	26 years, 6 months	21 years, 2 months
Height	5 ft 7 in (170 cm)	5 ft 4 1/2 in (164 cm)
Weight	134 1/4 lb (61 kg)	135 lb (61 kg)
Style	Orthodox	Orthodox
Recognition	WBA; Lightweight Champion	WBA; No. 3 Ranked Lightweight

Result
- Mancini wins via 1st-round technical knockout

Arturo Frias vs. Ray Mancini was a professional boxing match contested on May 8, 1982, for the WBA lightweight title.

== Background ==
Seven months prior, Ray Mancini had lost his first bid for a lightweight title when incumbent champion Alexis Argüello scored a late knockout over Mancini after a spirited bout. Despite his loss, Mancini was still viewed as top lightweight contender and quickly returned to the ring with a knockout victory over Manuel Abedoy in December 1981 and then knocked out Julio Valdez one month later on January 23, 1982. After, his defeat of Valdez, Mancini's promoter Bob Arum confirmed that Mancini would get his next title opportunity as he would next face the winner of the Arturo Frias–Ernesto España WBA lightweight title fight that was to take place one week later on January 30. Frias would claim the win by unanimous technical decision after the fight was stopped in the ninth round due to a gash beneath Frias' left eye, setting up a fight between him and Mancini on May 8. Though Frias, whom Arum paid a career-high $175,000 purse, and Mancini had already agreed to terms, the WBA, claiming that the fight had been incorrectly stopped, ruled in favor of a Frias–España rematch. In order to get España to step aside, Arum paid him a $50,000 sum and promised him that he would face the winner of the Frias–Mancini bout within 60 days.

Oddsmakers installed 4–1 odds in Mancini's favor, though he brushed off any notion that he was a favorite, stating " If I was a gambler, I might be interested in it. It's hard to be the favorite against the champion." Frias suffered a small cut on the bridge of his nose from an errant elbow during a sparring session just one week prior to the fight, briefly putting the bout in jeopardy. However, after being examined by Nevada Athletic Commission doctor, Frias was given the okay to go ahead with the fight.

== Fight Details ==
30 seconds into the fight, Frias stunned Mancini with a left hook that sent Mancini staggering backwards into the ropes. Frias quickly moved in on Mancini in an attempt to finish him off, but Mancini was able to regain his balance and the two fighters furiously traded punches for the better part of two minutes, with Mancini opening up a cut underneath Frias' left eye and Frias bloodying Mancini's nose and opening a cut on his left eyelid. Then, with less than a minute remaining in the round, Mancini staggered Frias with a left hook and sent him down to the canvas with another left. Though Frias was clearly hurt from the exchange, he rose to his feet and referee Richard Green allowed him to continue. Upon the fight resuming, Mancini quickly backed the dazed Frias into the ropes and landed a barrage of 25 to 30 punches to Frias' head before Green finally stepped in and stopped the bout. awarding Mancini the victory by technical knockout with six seconds remaining.

== Fight card ==
Confirmed bouts:

Weight Class	Weight		vs.		Method	Round
Lightweight	135 lbs.	Ray Mancini	def.	Arturo Frias (c)	TKO	1/15
Heavyweight	200+ lbs.	Randy Stephens	def.	Don Farmer	TKO	5/10
Flyweight	112 lbs.	Joey Olivo	def.	Silvestre Guerrero	TKO	5/10
Cruiserweight	190 lbs.	Chris Schwenke	def.	Jessie Avila	KO	1/10
Lightweight	135 lbs.	Kenny Bogner	def.	Manuel Cordoza	KO	1/8
Welterweight	147 lbs.	Mike Castronova	def.	Jack Alvarez	KO	4/6

== Broadcasting ==
Country	Broadcaster
United States	CBS

Preceded by vs. Ernesto España	Arturo Frias's bouts 8 May 1982	Succeeded by vs. Ruben Munoz Jr
Preceded by vs. Julio Valdez	Ray Mancini's bouts 8 May 1982	Succeeded by vs. Ernesto España
