= Sean O'Grady (boxer) =

American boxer

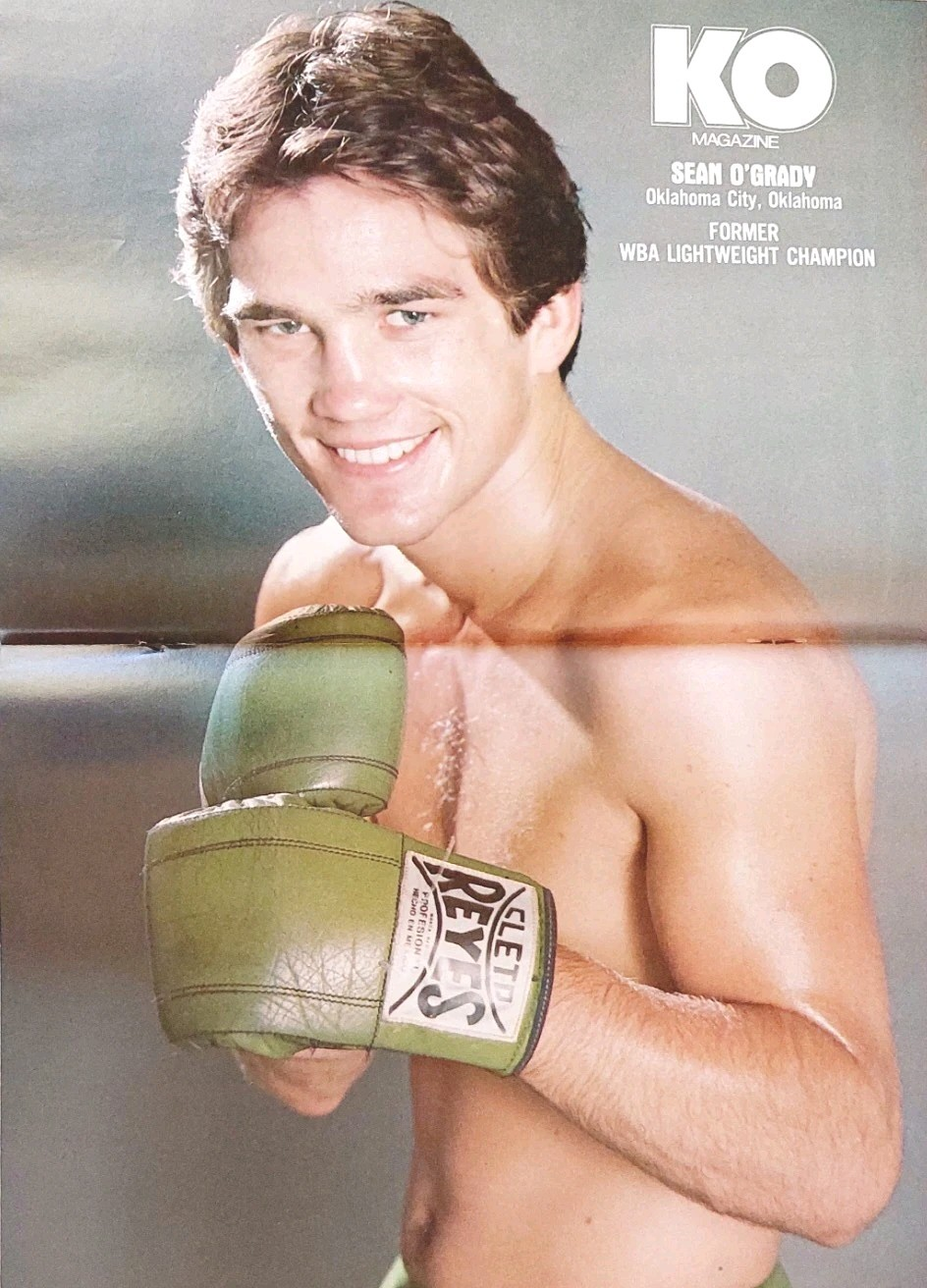
- O'Grady c. 1982

Personal information
- Nicknames: Bubblegum Kid; Bubblegum Bomber
- Born: February 10, 1959 (age 67) Austin, Texas, U.S.
- Height: 5 ft 10 in (178 cm)
- Weight: Lightweight

Boxing career
- Reach: 70 in (178 cm)
- Stance: Orthodox

Boxing record
- Total fights: 86
- Wins: 81
- Win by KO: 70
- Losses: 5

Sean O'Grady (born February 10, 1959) is the former WBA Lightweight Champion of the World, and currently an American commercial realtor. O'Grady had a record of 81 wins and five losses as a professional boxer, with 70 wins by knockout.

O'Grady is also a college graduate, boxing analyst, television personality, actor and former teen idol across the United States Midwest.

== Early life ==
O'Grady was born in Austin, Texas. The son of boxing trainer Pat O'Grady and boxing promoter Jean O'Grady, he moved around a lot when he was a younger kid, but his family settled in Oklahoma City, when he was 11 years old.

== Boxing career ==
O'Grady started boxing professionally in 1975. In 1980, he had his first world title try, when the World Boxing Council lightweight champion Jim Watt gave him an opportunity to fight for the title. O'Grady travelled to Scotland to fight Watt, but sustained a cut over the forehead due to a head butt late in the bout and lost by a technical knockout in round 12. The O'Grady's protested the fight's result 24 hours later while in Ireland, arguing that the cut had been caused by the headbutt, not a punch. Because of the controversy surrounding the fight, the World Boxing Association lightweight champion, Hilmer Kenty, gave O'Grady another opportunity at the title. They met on April 12, 1981. O'Grady again suffered a cut early in the bout, but he dropped Kenty in rounds two and eight and won a unanimous decision. In part because of problems with his manager/father, he never defended the WBA title and was eventually stripped of it. Pat O'Grady then formed the little-regarded (and very short lived) World Athletic Association to recognize Sean as a champion. O'Grady promptly lost this "championship" to Andy Ganigan of Hawaii.

He regularly chewed bubble gum upon entering the ring prior to fights, and because of this, he earned the nickname "Bubble Gum Bomber."

== Professional boxing record ==
86 fights	81 wins	5 losses
By knockout	70	4
By decision	11	1

No.	Result	Record	Opponent	Type	Round, time	Date	Age	Location	Notes
86	Loss	81–5	John Verderosa	TKO	4 (10), 2:47	Mar 20, 1983	24 years, 38 days	UIC Pavilion, Chicago, Illinois, U.S.	
85	Win	81–4	Jose Luis Gonzalez	TKO	5 (10)	Feb 10, 1983	24 years, 0 days	Northridge Indoor Arena, Los Angeles, California, U.S.	
84	Loss	80–4	Pete Ranzany	SD	10	Oct 30, 1982	23 years, 262 days	Caesars Palace, Paradise, Nevada, U.S.	
83	Win	80–3	Orin Butler	KO	1 (10), 2:06	May 29, 1982	23 years, 108 days	Myriad Convention Center, Oklahoma City, Oklahoma, U.S.	
82	Win	79–3	Jose Hernandez	RTD	3 (15), 3:00	Apr 3, 1982	23 years, 52 days	Mammoth Gardens, Denver, Colorado, U.S.	Won vacant WWA welterweight title
81	Win	78–3	Lupe Sanchez	KO	3 (10)	Mar 18, 1982	23 years, 36 days	Hilton Inn West, Oklahoma City, Oklahoma, U.S.	
80	Win	77–3	Eugene Baldwin	TKO	4 (10), 1:14	Feb 9, 1982	22 years, 364 days	Myriad Convention Center, Oklahoma City, Oklahoma, U.S.	
79	Loss	76–3	Andrew Ganigan	KO	2 (15), 2:08	Oct 31, 1981	22 years, 263 days	Convention Center, Little Rock, Arkansas, U.S.	Lost WWA lightweight title
78	Win	76–2	John Morgan	UD	10	Sep 26, 1981	22 years, 228 days	Myriad Convention Center, Oklahoma City, Oklahoma, U.S.	
77	Win	75–2	Hilmer Kenty	UD	15	Apr 12, 1981	22 years, 61 days	Ballys Park Place, Atlantic City, New Jersey, U.S.	Won WBA lightweight title
76	Win	74–2	Jose Cabrera	TKO	12 (15), 2:37	Mar 17, 1981	22 years, 35 days	State Fair Arena, Oklahoma City, Oklahoma, U.S.	
75	Loss	73–2	Jim Watt	TKO	12 (15), 2:37	Nov 1, 1980	21 years, 265 days	Kelvin Hall, Glasgow, Scotland, U.K.	For WBC lightweight title
74	Win	73–1	Jose Luis Gonzalez	TKO	3 (10), 1:17	Sep 25, 1980	21 years, 228 days	U Arena, Oklahoma City, Oklahoma, U.S.	
73	Win	72–1	Carlos Villacana	TKO	6 (10)	Sep 9, 1980	21 years, 212 days	Lloyd Noble Center, Norman, Oklahoma, U.S.	
72	Win	71–1	Gonzalo Montellano	MD	12	Jul 27, 1980	21 years, 168 days	Civic Auditorium, Omaha, Nebraska, U.S.	Retained USBA lightweight title
71	Win	70–1	Scotty Foreman	TKO	2 (10), 2:15	Jun 10, 1980	21 years, 121 days	State Fair Arena, Oklahoma City, Oklahoma, U.S.	
70	Win	69–1	Ramiro Hernandez	TKO	5 (10)	Dec 15, 1979	20 years, 308 days	Fairgrounds' International Building, Oklahoma City, Oklahoma, U.S.	
69	Win	68–1	Arturo Leon	UD	15	Oct 23, 1979	20 years, 255 days	Fairgrounds' International Building, Oklahoma City, Oklahoma, U.S.	Won vacant USBA lightweight title
68	Win	67–1	Jose Luis Martinez	KO	4 (10), 0:16	Sep 20, 1979	20 years, 223 days	Assembly Center, Tulsa, Oklahoma, U.S.	
67	Win	66–1	Dieter Schantz	KO	2 (10), 2:54	Jul 19, 1979	20 years, 159 days	Fairgrounds' International Building, Oklahoma City, Oklahoma, U.S.	
66	Win	65–1	Roberto Perez	TKO	5 (10)	Apr 28, 1979	20 years, 77 days	Civic Auditorium, Omaha, Nebraska, U.S.	
65	Win	64–1	Jose Hernandez	UD	10	Mar 17, 1979	20 years, 35 days	Fairgrounds' International Building, Oklahoma City, Oklahoma, U.S.	
64	Win	63–1	Juan Garcia	KO	2 (10), 1:38	Feb 16, 1978	19 years, 6 days	Convention Center, Little Rock, Arkansas, U.S.	
63	Win	62–1	Marion Thomas	KO	2 (10), 1:10	Jan 25, 1978	18 years, 349 days	Fairgrounds' International Building, Oklahoma City, Oklahoma, U.S.	
62	Win	61–1	Beau Jaynes	TKO	2 (10), 2:50	Dec 7, 1978	19 years, 300 days	Fairgrounds' International Building, Oklahoma City, Oklahoma, U.S.	
61	Win	60–1	Paulino Garcia	KO	5 (10)	Nov 29, 1978	19 years, 292 days	Saint Albert High School Gym, Council Bluffs, Iowa, U.S.	
60	Win	59–1	Freddie Harris	TKO	7 (10)	Nov 16, 1978	19 years, 279 days	Fairgrounds' International Building, Oklahoma City, Oklahoma, U.S.	
59	Win	58–1	Al Franklin	TKO	6 (10), 1:15	Oct 11, 1978	19 years, 243 days	Regis College Field House, Denver, Colorado, U.S.	
58	Win	57–1	Shig Fukuyama	TKO	5 (10), 2:59	Jun 10, 1978	19 years, 120 days	State Fair Arena, Oklahoma City, Oklahoma, U.S.	
57	Win	56–1	Harvey Wilson	TKO	2 (10), 1:56	May 1, 1978	19 years, 80 days	Civic Auditorium, Omaha, Nebraska, U.S.	
56	Win	55–1	Romeo Anaya	KO	3 (10), 2:33	Apr 15, 1978	19 years, 64 days	Olympic Auditorium, Los Angeles, California, U.S.	
55	Win	54–1	Ramon Campos	KO	1 (10)	Mar 23, 1978	19 years, 41 days	Civic Auditorium, Omaha, Nebraska, U.S.	
54	Win	53–1	Eddie Freeman	TKO	1 (10), 1:47	Mar 17, 1978	19 years, 35 days	The Aladdin, Paradise, Nevada, U.S.	
53	Win	52–1	Bill Pearish	KO	2 (10)	Dec 6, 1977	18 years, 299 days	Ramada Inn Central, Oklahoma City, Oklahoma, U.S.	
52	Win	51–1	Jose Olivares	TKO	5 (10)	Oct 25, 1977	18 years, 257 days	Convention Center, Anaheim, California, U.S.	
51	Win	50–1	Gilberto Lara	KO	1 (10)	Sep 6, 1977	18 years, 208 days	Ramada Inn Convention Center, Oklahoma City, Oklahoma, U.S.	
50	Win	49–1	Ricardo Flores	KO	2 (10)	Jul 19, 1977	18 years, 159 days	Ramada Inn Central, Oklahoma City, Oklahoma, U.S.	
49	Win	48–1	David Vasquez	MD	10	Jun 22, 1977	18 years, 132 days	Madison Square Garden, New York City, New York, U.S.	
48	Win	47–1	Jerome Smith	RTD	1 (10), 3:00	Jun 7, 1977	18 years, 117 days	Tradewinds Motel, Oklahoma City, Oklahoma, U.S.	
47	Win	46–1	Tony Sanchez	KO	2 (10)	May 17, 1977	18 years, 96 days	Ramada Inn Central, Oklahoma City, Oklahoma, U.S.	
46	Win	45–1	Raul Guillen	KO	1 (10)	Apr 5, 1977	18 years, 54 days	Ramada Inn Central, Oklahoma City, Oklahoma, U.S.	
45	Win	44–1	Melvin Jameson	KO	1 (10)	Mar 15, 1977	18 years, 33 days	Ramada Inn Central, Oklahoma City, Oklahoma, U.S.	
44	Win	43–1	Earl Large	KO	9 (15), 2:35	Mar 1, 1977	18 years, 19 days	Ramada Inn Central, Oklahoma City, Oklahoma, U.S.	
43	Win	42–1	Francisco Robles	KO	2 (10)	Dec 21, 1976	17 years, 315 days	Ramada Inn Central, Oklahoma City, Oklahoma, U.S.	
42	Win	41–1	Raul Carreon	RTD	4 (15)	Dec 7, 1976	17 years, 301 days	Ramada Inn Central, Oklahoma City, Oklahoma, U.S.	
41	Win	40–1	Jose Angel Cazares	KO	2 (10)	Nov 16, 1976	17 years, 280 days	Ramada Inn Central, Oklahoma City, Oklahoma, U.S.	
40	Win	39–1	Esteban Olvera	KO	6 (10)	Nov 2, 1976	17 years, 266 days	Ramada Inn Central, Oklahoma City, Oklahoma, U.S.	
39	Win	38–1	William Curtis	KO	2 (10)	Oct 19, 1976	17 years, 252 days	Ramada Inn Central, Oklahoma City, Oklahoma, U.S.	
38	Win	37–1	Danny Young	KO	1 (10), 2:06	Oct 5, 1976	17 years, 238 days	Ramada Inn Central, Oklahoma City, Oklahoma, U.S.	
37	Win	36–1	Richie Puentes	KO	2 (10)	Sep 21, 1976	17 years, 224 days	Ramada Inn Central, Oklahoma City, Oklahoma, U.S.	
36	Win	35–1	Joe Medrano	KO	3 (10)	Sep 7, 1976	17 years, 210 days	Ramada Inn Central, Oklahoma City, Oklahoma, U.S.	
35	Win	34–1	Blackie Sandoval	TKO	1 (10), 1:42	Jun 1, 1976	17 years, 112 days	Red Carpet Inn, Oklahoma City, Oklahoma, U.S.	
34	Win	33–1	Eliseo Estrada	TKO	3 (10), 1:20	May 18, 1976	17 years, 98 days	Red Carpet Inn, Oklahoma City, Oklahoma, U.S.	
33	Win	32–1	Frankie Amano	KO	1 (10), 2:14	May 4, 1976	17 years, 84 days	Red Carpet Inn, Oklahoma City, Oklahoma, U.S.	
32	Win	31–1	Manuel Tarazon	KO	3 (10), 1:35	Apr 20, 1976	17 years, 70 days	Red Carpet Inn, Oklahoma City, Oklahoma, U.S.	
31	Win	30–1	Domingo Luna	KO	3 (10)	Apr 6, 1976	17 years, 56 days	Red Carpet Inn, Oklahoma City, Oklahoma, U.S.	
30	Loss	29–1	Danny Lopez	RTD	4 (10), 3:00	Feb 25, 1976	17 years, 15 days	Great Western Forum, Inglewood, California, U.S.	
29	Win	29–0	Luis Martinez	KO	1 (10)	Feb 3, 1976	16 years, 358 days	Red Carpet Inn, Oklahoma City, Oklahoma, U.S.	
28	Win	28–0	Ken Conners	KO	1 (10)	Jan 20, 1976	16 years, 344 days	Red Carpet Inn, Oklahoma City, Oklahoma, U.S.	
27	Win	27–0	Shannon Williams	KO	2 (10)	Jan 6, 1976	16 years, 330 days	Red Carpet Inn, Oklahoma City, Oklahoma, U.S.	
26	Win	26–0	Al Thompson	KO	3 (12)	Dec 16, 1975	16 years, 309 days	Red Carpet Inn, Oklahoma City, Oklahoma, U.S.	
25	Win	25–0	Luciano Medina	KO	4 (10)	Dec 2, 1975	16 years, 295 days	Red Carpet Inn, Oklahoma City, Oklahoma, U.S.	
24	Win	24–0	Roberto Rodriguez	KO	3 (10), 1:23	Nov 20, 1975	16 years, 283 days	Civic Auditorium, Omaha, Nebraska, U.S.	
23	Win	23–0	Tony Ramirez	KO	3 (10)	Nov 18, 1975	16 years, 281 days	Red Carpet Inn, Oklahoma City, Oklahoma, U.S.	
22	Win	22–0	Ramon Reyna	KO	2 (10)	Nov 4, 1975	16 years, 267 days	Red Carpet Inn, Oklahoma City, Oklahoma, U.S.	
21	Win	21–0	Raul Carrez	KO	1 (10)	Oct 21, 1975	16 years, 253 days	Red Carpet Inn, Oklahoma City, Oklahoma, U.S.	
20	Win	20–0	Harvey Wilson	UD	8	Sep 4, 1975	16 years, 206 days	Civic Auditorium, Omaha, Nebraska, U.S.	
19	Win	19–0	Simmie Black	TKO	3 (10)	Sep 2, 1975	16 years, 204 days	Red Carpet Inn, Oklahoma City, Oklahoma, U.S.	
18	Win	18–0	Harvey Wilson	UD	10	Aug 19, 1975	16 years, 190 days	Red Carpet Inn, Oklahoma City, Oklahoma, U.S.	
17	Win	17–0	Victor Seco Luna	KO	1 (10)	Aug 5, 1975	16 years, 176 days	Red Carpet Inn, Oklahoma City, Oklahoma, U.S.	
16	Win	16–0	Ramon Campos	UD	10	Jul 15, 1975	16 years, 155 days	Red Carpet Inn, Oklahoma City, Oklahoma, U.S.	
15	Win	15–0	Ramon Reyes	TKO	3 (6)	Jul 9, 1975	16 years, 149 days	Ballpark, Memphis, Tennessee, U.S.	
14	Win	14–0	Simmie Black	KO	4 (10)	Jul 1, 1975	16 years, 141 days	Red Carpet Inn, Oklahoma City, Oklahoma, U.S.	
13	Win	13–0	Ezequiel Campos	KO	1 (10)	Jun 17, 1975	16 years, 127 days	Ramada Inn Convention Center, Oklahoma City, Oklahoma, U.S.	
12	Win	12–0	Earl Booth	KO	1 (6)	Jun 9, 1975	16 years, 119 days	Memorial Auditorium, Dallas, Texas, U.S.	
11	Win	11–0	Ramon Perez	KO	3 (10)	Jun 3, 1975	16 years, 113 days	Red Carpet Inn, Oklahoma City, Oklahoma, U.S.	
10	Win	10–0	Ramon Campos	PTS	6	May 20, 1975	16 years, 99 days	Red Carpet Inn, Oklahoma City, Oklahoma, U.S.	
9	Win	9–0	David Williams	KO	1 (6)	May 17, 1975	16 years, 96 days	Rose City Community Center, Little Rock, Arkansas, U.S.	
8	Win	8–0	Earl Booth	KO	1 (6)	May 6, 1975	16 years, 85 days	Red Carpet Inn, Oklahoma City, Oklahoma, U.S.	
7	Win	7–0	Tyrone Taylor	KO	2 (6)	Apr 15, 1975	16 years, 64 days	Red Carpet Inn, Oklahoma City, Oklahoma, U.S.	
6	Win	6–0	Rocky Matthews	KO	2 (4)	Apr 1, 1975	16 years, 50 days	Red Carpet Inn, Oklahoma City, Oklahoma, U.S.	
5	Win	5–0	Muhammad Muffleh	KO	1 (6)	Mar 18, 1975	16 years, 36 days	Red Carpet Inn, Oklahoma City, Oklahoma, U.S.	
4	Win	4–0	James Word	KO	1 (6)	Mar 4, 1975	16 years, 22 days	Red Carpet Inn, Oklahoma City, Oklahoma, U.S.	
3	Win	3–0	Joe Matthews	KO	1 (4), 2:16	Feb 18, 1975	16 years, 8 days	Red Carpet Inn, Oklahoma City, Oklahoma, U.S.	
2	Win	2–0	Willie Johnson	KO	1 (4)	Feb 4, 1975	15 years, 359 days	Red Carpet Inn, Oklahoma City, Oklahoma, U.S.	
1	Win	1–0	David Tymes	KO	1 (4), 2:36	Jan 21, 1975	15 years, 345 days	Red Carpet Inn, Oklahoma City, Oklahoma, U.S.	

== TV analyst ==
O'Grady served as analyst for television boxing show USA Tuesday Night Fights which aired from October 1982 to August 1998 on the USA Network.

== See also ==
- List of world lightweight boxing champions

Sporting positions
Regional boxing titles
Vacant Title last held by Johnny Lira	USBA lightweight champion October 23, 1979 – April 12, 1981; Won world title	Vacant Title next held by Curtis Harris
World boxing titles
Preceded by Hilmer Kenty	WBA lightweight champion April 12, 1981 – August 14, 1981; Stripped	Vacant Title next held by Claude Noel
