= William "Caveman" Lee =

American boxer

William Lee (born September 27, 1956 in Philadelphia, Pennsylvania) is a former professional middleweight boxer who fought out of the fabled Kronk Gym in Detroit.

He is best known for his win against John LoCicero and his unsuccessful challenge of undisputed world middleweight champion Marvin Hagler in 1982.

== Career ==
One fight for which Lee is noted was with John LoCicero in July, 1981. Televised on ESPN, their battle garnered a good degree of renown that year for its ebb, flow, ferocity and stifling conditions. In an interview, long time boxing commentator Al Bernstein put it thus: "It was in the early Kronk gym days, in the Twenty Grand Showroom in Detroit with no air conditioning. It was August and amazingly hot. In the fifth round, John LoCicero and Caveman Lee put on a round of boxing that was just beyond belief. First, LoCicero went down, got up, and hit Lee with like twenty-five unanswered punches. It was ridiculous. LoCicero ultimately got knocked out in that round and it was about as exciting as anything I've ever seen."

Indeed, in another interview Berstein mentioned this round ahead of Hagler/Hearns and Castillo/Corrales when relating the best rounds he had ever seen.

The other notable item in Lee's boxing background is more ignominious. When Lee's Kronk stablemate Mickey Goodwin was slated to challenge Marvin Hagler for the Middleweight Championship, but suffered a training injury, Lee stepped in to replace him. Unfortunately, Lee didn't have quite the showing against Hagler as he had against LoCicero. Lee was blown out in just over a minute.

== Hagler-Lee middleweight title fight ==
On Sunday, March 7, 1982 in Atlantic City, NJ, Lee fought undisputed world middleweight champion Marvin Hagler in a nationally televised bout on ABC in which Keith Jackson provided solo commentary. Lee started well, landing a good left hook on Hagler's face within the first 20 seconds. However, Hagler jolted Lee with a straight right hand, and knocked him down with a crisp left-right combination. Lee toppled forward to the canvas. He rose on shaky legs and took a mandatory eight count. Referee Larry Hazzard permitted the bout to continue. Hagler relentlessly attacked the challenger, driving Lee against the ropes. Hazzard stopped the fight as Lee was falling into the ropes. There was no controversy about the stoppage as Lee was clearly woozy and needed Hazzard's assistance to get to his corner. The contest lasted a mere 67 seconds.

== Professional boxing record ==
27 fights	22 wins	5 losses
By knockout	21	4
By decision	1	1
Draws	0	

== Retirement ==
After boxing, Lee's story also ran into unfortunate results. He did three different stints in prison for armed robbery. However, once paroled for that third time, he found a job at an auto parts yard and was working there into 2008.

== Additional information ==
Lee's nickname "Caveman" was due to the sideburns he wore in the late 1970s.
