= Ray Mancini =

American boxer (born 1961)

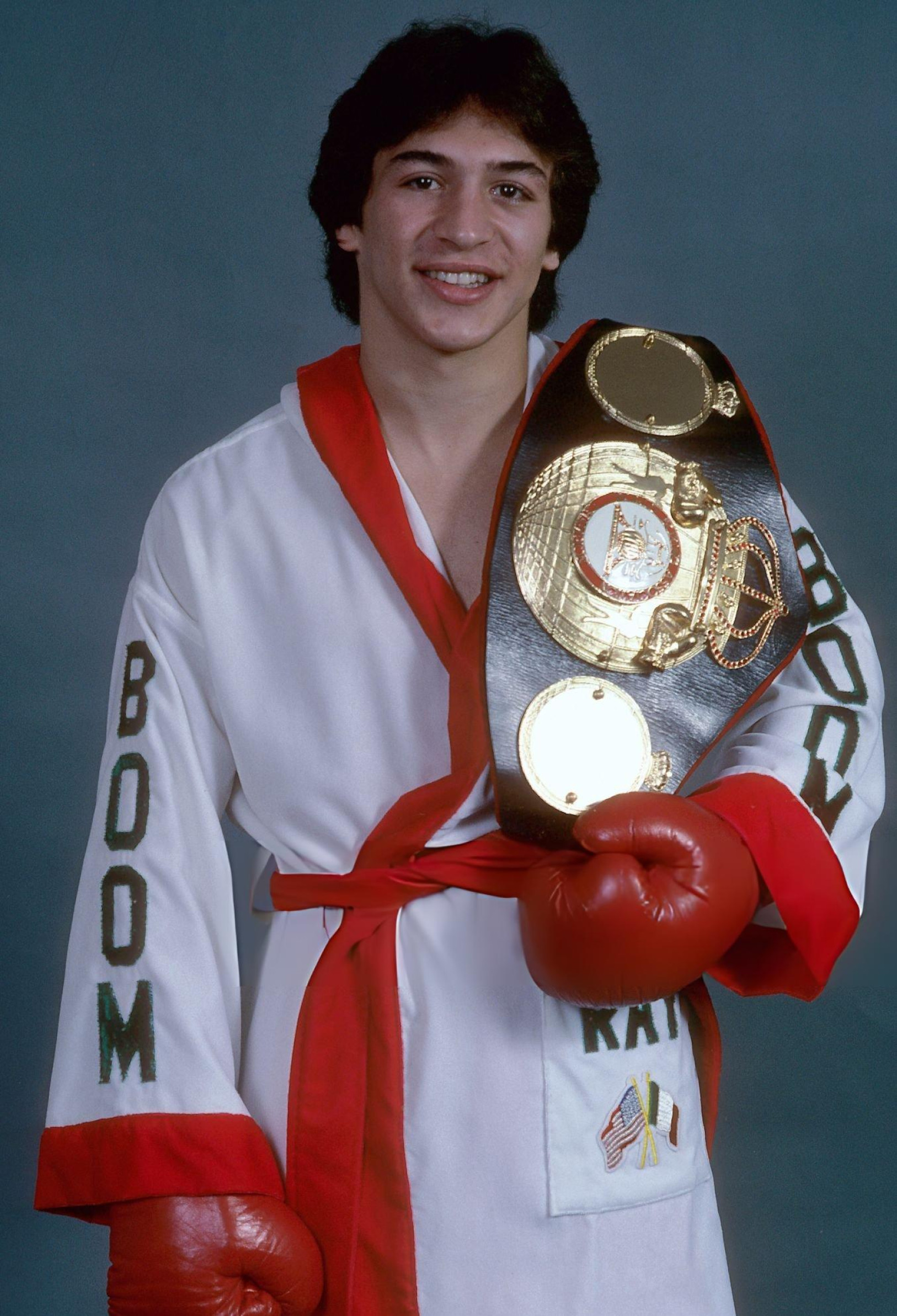
- Mancini in 1982

Personal information
- Nickname: Boom Boom
- Born: Raymond Michael Mancino; March 4, 1961 (age 65) Youngstown, Ohio, U.S.
- Height: 5 ft 4 1/2 in (164 cm)
- Weight: Lightweight; Light welterweight

Boxing career
- Reach: 65 in (165 cm)
- Stance: Orthodox

Boxing record
- Total fights: 34
- Wins: 29
- Win by KO: 23
- Losses: 5

Raymond Michael Mancino (born March 4, 1961), better known as Ray "Boom Boom" Mancini, is an American former professional boxer who competed professionally from 1979 to 1992 and who has since worked as an actor and sports commentator. He held the WBA lightweight world title from 1982 to 1984. Mancini inherited his nickname from his father, boxer Lenny Mancini. In 2015, Mancini was inducted into the International Boxing Hall of Fame.

== Early life and amateur career ==
Mancini was born Raymond Michael Mancino in Youngstown, Ohio on March 4, 1961. He is of Italian descent, with roots in Bagheria, Sicily. Boxing played a prominent role in the Mancini family history. Mancini's father, Lenny Mancini (the original "Boom Boom"), was a top-ranked contender during the 1940s. Lenny Mancini's dream, however, was dashed when he was wounded during World War II. Although Lenny Mancini returned to boxing, limitations resulting from his injuries prevented him from fulfilling his potential. He was a childhood friend and neighbor to future Oklahoma Sooners football head coach Bob Stoops.

Lenny inspired Ray to develop his boxing skills and encouraged him to train at a gym when he was quite young. Thus, Ray then began his quest to win the world title for his father.

== Professional career ==
On October 18, 1979, Mancini made his professional debut and defeated Phil Bowen with a first-round knockout. His whirlwind punching style caught the attention of network executives at several American television networks, and he became a regular on their sports programming. During this time Mancini defeated some notable boxers including former US champion Norman Goins in March 1981.

=== Lightweight title challenges ===
On April 30, 1980, Mancini defeated Bobby Sparks with a knockout at 1:28 in the first round for the regional Ohio State Lightweight title. Over a year later on May 16, 1981, Mancini won his first major title by defeating Jorge Morales for the WBC-affiliated NABF Lightweight championship when the referee determined that Morales could not continue after the 9th round. In the post-match interview, Ray said that he was "keeping this title for myself because the world title is going to my dad". Two months later, he successfully defended the title against José Luis Ramírez after a unanimous decision. Mancini's first attempt at a world title came on October 3 when he was pitted against Alexis Argüello for his World Boxing Council lightweight world title. The event was selected by many (including The Ring and ESPN) as one of the most spectacular fights of the 1980s. Mancini gave Argüello trouble early and built a lead on the scorecards, but Argüello used his experience to his advantage in the later rounds and stopped Mancini in the 14th round.

Mancini would rebound from the loss to Argüello by winning his next two bouts, including a second successful defense of his NABF Lightweight title against Julio Valdez (10th-round TKO) which would earn him another chance at a world title.

=== WBA Lightweight champion ===
On May 8, 1982, in a match held at The Aladdin in Las Vegas, he challenged the new World Boxing Association lightweight world champion, Arturo Frias. Fifteen seconds into the fight, Frias caught Mancini with a left hook to the chin and another combination made Mancini bleed from his eyebrow. Mancini recovered and dropped Frias right in the center of the ring with a combination. Dazed, Frias got backed up, and Mancini immediately went on the offensive and trapped Frias against the ropes. After many unanswered blows, referee Richard Greene stopped the fight at 2:54 in the first round, and the Mancini family finally had a world champion.

Mancini's first title defense, against former world champion Ernesto España, went smoothly with a Mancini knockout win in the 6th round.

=== Match against Duk Koo Kim ===
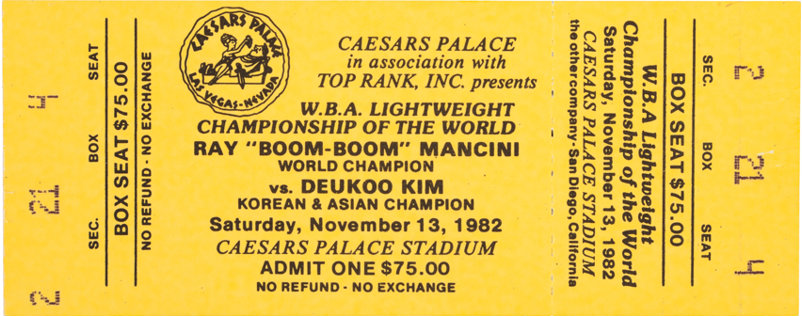
Ticket stub for Mancini's fight against Duk Koo Kim

On November 13, 1982, a 21-year-old Mancini met 27-year-old South Korean challenger Duk Koo Kim. Kim had struggled to make the 135-pound (61 kg) weight limit, and had to lose several pounds shortly before the fight. The title bout, at Caesars Palace in Las Vegas, was televised live on CBS Sports. Mancini won by TKO in the 14th round. Moments after the fight ended, Kim collapsed and fell into a coma, having suffered a subdural hematoma, and died five days later. The week after his death, the cover of Sports Illustrated magazine showed Mancini and Kim battling, under the title "Tragedy in the Ring".

Mancini went to the funeral in South Korea and fell into a deep depression afterwards. He has said that the hardest moments came when people approached him and asked if he was the boxer who "killed" Duk Koo Kim. Mancini went through a period of reflection and blamed himself for Kim's death. In addition, Kim's mother died by suicide three months after the fight, and the bout's referee, Richard Green, killed himself in July 1983.

As a result of Kim's death, the WBC took steps to shorten its title bouts to a maximum of 12 rounds. The WBA and WBO followed in 1988, and the IBF in 1989.

=== Later title defenses ===
Following Kim's death, Mancini took a brief hiatus, canceling a planned title defense scheduled for the following month against Roberto Elizondo in Italy. He returned to boxing in early February 1983, defeating George Feeney in a non-title bout held in Italy.

Mancini's next title defense took place in Madison Square Garden on September 15, 1983 against Orlando Romero, which Mancini won via ninth-round knockout. His final successful defense came against two-division world champion Bobby Chacon on January 14, 1984. Mancini dominated Chacon before knocking him out in the third-round in what would prove to be the final victory of his professional career.

=== Fights against Livingstone Bramble ===
In June 1984, Mancini, still recovering from the emotional trauma of Kim's death, fought Livingstone Bramble to defend his title in Buffalo, New York. This time however, Mancini came out on the losing end, defeated after 14 rounds. Mancini lost the title, but not before a fierce effort that resulted in an overnight stay at Millard Fillmore Hospital and 71 stitches around one eye.

Mancini returned to the ring twice to attempt to regain his world title. In a rematch with Bramble, Mancini lost the fight by one point on all three judges' scorecards in a 15-round decision. His next attempt came in March 1989, when he lost to Héctor 'Macho' Camacho in a split decision, Mancini had one final fight in April 1992, against former lightweight champion Greg Haugen. Mancini lost when referee Mills Lane stopped the fight in the seventh round.

== Retirement and later work ==
A made-for-television movie based on Mancini's life aired in the 1980s. The former champion was able to keep 75 percent of his $12 million in purse money, which enabled him to pursue a broad range of interests in retirement.

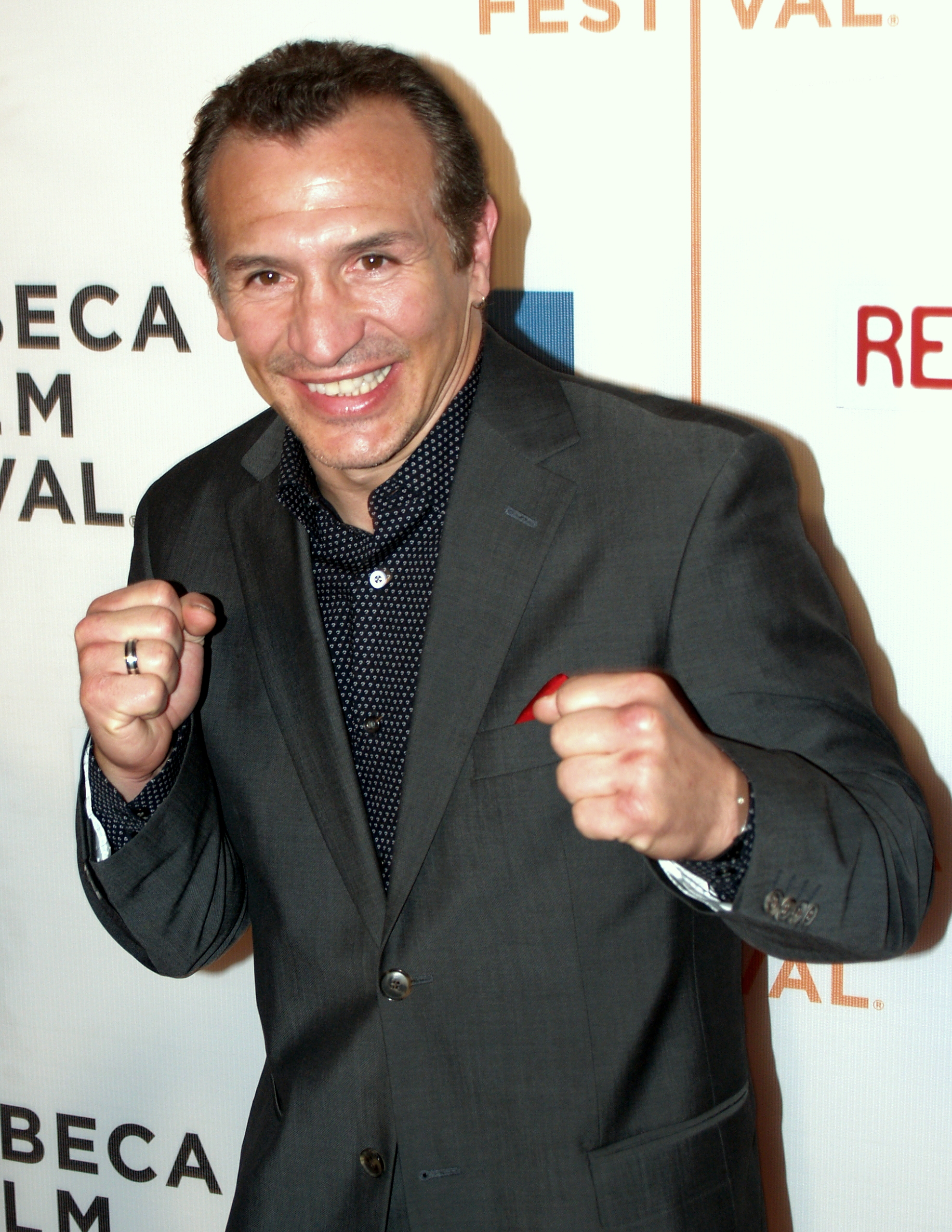
Mancini in 2008

Mancini, who as of 2007 resided in Los Angeles, owns the El Campeon Cigar Company and operates two movie production companies. Mancini appeared in and produced a handful of films. He appeared in the quirky 1994 comedy The Search for One-eye Jimmy, in David Mamet's MMA film Redbelt, and in the 2000 remake Body and Soul. Mancini played Charlie, Frank's retired father, in Bad Frank (2017).

Mancini produced Youngstown: Still Standing in 2010, which premiered at the 34th Cleveland International Film Festival on March 24. The documentary film featured his hometown friend, actor Ed O'Neill, and also included Jim Cummings, Kelly Pavlik, Jay Williams, Andrea Wood, and Mancini himself, among many other Youngstown natives and locals. John Chechitelli – another Youngstown native – directed and edited the 89-minute-long film. It recounts the history of Youngstown, Ohio, from its founding in 1797 to the present.

Mancini has a son also named Ray who appeared in the YouTube reality series SummerBreak, in which Manicini also had a guest role.

Mancini practices Brazilian Jiu-Jitsu and holds a purple belt in the martial art. He became a fight analyst for the Fox reality series Celebrity Boxing.

== In popular culture ==
- Warren Zevon included a biographical song about Mancini called "Boom Boom Mancini" on his 1987 album Sentimental Hygiene.
- Sun Kil Moon's 2003 album Ghosts of the Great Highway includes the track "Duk Koo Kim" which references the fight between Mancini and Kim.
- In 2013, a documentary about Mancini was released called The Good Son: The Life of Ray Boom Boom Mancini.

== Professional boxing record ==
34 fights	29 wins	5 losses
By knockout	23	3
By decision	6	2

No.	Result	Record	Opponent	Type	Round, time	Date	Location	Notes
34	Loss	29–5	Greg Haugen	TKO	7 (12), 2:27	April 3, 1992	Convention Center, Reno, Nevada, U.S.	For vacant NABF light welterweight title
33	Loss	29–4	Héctor Camacho	SD	12	March 6, 1989	Lawlor Events Center, Reno, Nevada, U.S.	For inaugural WBO light welterweight title
32	Loss	29–3	Livingstone Bramble	UD	15	February 16, 1985	Lawlor Events Center, Reno, Nevada, U.S.	For WBA lightweight title
31	Loss	29–2	Livingstone Bramble	TKO	14 (15), 0:53	June 1, 1984	Memorial Auditorium, Buffalo, New York, U.S.	Lost WBA lightweight title
30	Win	29–1	Bobby Chacon	TKO	3 (15), 1:17	January 14, 1984	Lawlor Events Center, Reno, Nevada, U.S.	Retained WBA lightweight title
29	Win	28–1	Johnny Torres	KO	1 (10), 2:58	November 25, 1983	Caesars Palace, Paradise, Nevada, U.S.	
28	Win	27–1	Orlando Romero	KO	9 (15), 1:56	September 15, 1983	Madison Square Garden, New York City, New York, U.S.	Retained WBA lightweight title
27	Win	26–1	George Feeney	UD	10	February 6, 1983	Palazzetto dello Sport, Saint-Vincent, Italy	
26	Win	25–1	Kim Duk-koo	KO	14 (15), 0:19	November 13, 1982	Caesars Palace, Paradise, Nevada, U.S.	Retained WBA lightweight title; Kim died five days later due to injuries sustained in the fight
25	Win	24–1	Ernesto España	TKO	6 (15), 2:59	July 24, 1982	Mollenkopf Stadium, Warren, Ohio, U.S.	Retained WBA lightweight title
24	Win	23–1	Arturo Frias	TKO	1 (15), 2:54	May 8, 1982	The Aladdin, Paradise, Nevada, U.S.	Won WBA lightweight title
23	Win	22–1	Julio Valdez	TKO	10 (12), 0:59	January 23, 1982	Sands, Atlantic City, New Jersey, U.S.	Retained NABF lightweight title
22	Win	21–1	Manuel Abedoy	TKO	2 (10), 2:08	December 26, 1981	Bally's Park Place, Atlantic City, New Jersey, U.S.	
21	Loss	20–1	Alexis Argüello	TKO	14 (15), 1:44	October 3, 1981	Bally's Park Place, Atlantic City, New Jersey, U.S.	For WBC and The Ring lightweight titles
20	Win	20–0	José Luis Ramírez	UD	12	July 19, 1981	Packard Music Hall, Warren, Ohio, U.S.	Retained NABF lightweight title
19	Win	19–0	Jorge Morales	RTD	9 (12), 3:00	May 16, 1981	Concord Resort Hotel, Thompson, New York, U.S.	Won NABF lightweight title
18	Win	18–0	Al Ford	UD	10	April 2, 1981	Conrad Hotel, Chicago, Illinois, U.S.	
17	Win	17–0	Norman Goins	KO	2 (10), 0:37	March 12, 1981	Felt Forum, New York City, New York, U.S.	
16	Win	16–0	Marvin Ladson	KO	1 (10), 0:57	December 17, 1980	St. John Arena, Steubenville, Ohio, U.S.	
15	Win	15–0	Kelvin Lampkin	KO	2 (10), 2:10	December 9, 1980	Packard Music Hall, Warren, Ohio, U.S.	
14	Win	14–0	Bobby Plegge	TKO	6 (10)	October 28, 1980	Packard Music Hall, Warren, Ohio, U.S.	
13	Win	13–0	Johnny Summerhays	UD	10	September 9, 1980	Packard Music Hall, Warren, Ohio, U.S.	
12	Win	12–0	Jaime Nava	PTS	10	July 30, 1980	Silver Slipper, Paradise, Nevada, U.S.	
11	Win	11–0	Leon Smith	KO	1 (8)	July 23, 1980	Silver Slipper, Paradise, Nevada, U.S.	
10	Win	10–0	Trevor Evelyn	KO	2 (8), 1:39	June 18, 1980	Fieldhouse, Struthers, Ohio, U.S.	
9	Win	9–0	Bobby Sparks	KO	1 (12), 1:28	April 30, 1980	Fieldhouse, Struthers, Ohio, U.S.	
8	Win	8–0	Antonio Rutledge	TKO	1 (6), 1:44	March 17, 1980	Market Square Arena, Indianapolis, Indiana, U.S.	
7	Win	7–0	Ramiro Hernandez	TKO	3 (8), 1:35	January 26, 1980	Mississippi Coliseum, Jackson, Mississippi, U.S.	
6	Win	6–0	Charlie Evans	KO	2 (6), 0:08	January 22, 1980	Market Square Arena, Indianapolis, Indiana, U.S.	
5	Win	5–0	Dale Gordon	KO	1 (8)	January 15, 1980	Memorial High School Fieldhouse, Campbell, Ohio, U.S.	
4	Win	4–0	Roberto Perez	KO	1 (6), 1:05	December 14, 1979	Convention Center, Dallas, Texas, U.S.	
3	Win	3–0	Ricky Patterson	KO	2 (6), 1:11	November 24, 1979	D.C. Armory, Washington, D.C., U.S.	
2	Win	2–0	Lou Daniels	UD	6	November 13, 1979	Convention Center, Phoenix, Arizona, U.S.	
1	Win	1–0	Phil Bowen	KO	1, 1:59	October 18, 1979	Fieldhouse, Struthers, Ohio, U.S.	

Sporting positions
Regional boxing titles
Preceded by Jorge Morales	NABF lightweight champion May 16, 1981 – May 1982; Vacated	Vacant Title next held by José Luis Ramírez
World boxing titles
Preceded by Arturo Frias	WBA lightweight champion May 8, 1982 – June 1, 1984	Succeeded by Livingstone Bramble
