= Ricky Womack =

American boxer (1961–2002)

Personal information
- Nickname: Wonderful
- Nationality: American
- Born: Rick R. Womack; May 7, 1961 Detroit, Michigan, U.S.
- Died: January 19, 2002 (aged 40) Madison Heights, Michigan, U.S.
- Height: 5 ft 11.5 in (182 cm)
- Weight: Light heavyweight; Heavyweight

Boxing career
- Reach: 74.5 in (189 cm)
- Stance: Orthodox

Boxing record
- Total fights: 14
- Wins: 13
- Win by KO: 6
- Losses: 0
- Draws: 1
Medal record
Men's amateur boxing
Representing the United States
North American Championships
Gold medal – first place	1983 Houston	Light heavyweight
World Cup
Silver medal – second place	1983 Rome	Light heavyweight

Ricky Womack (May 7, 1961 in Detroit, Michigan – January 19, 2002 at St. John Oakland Hospital, Madison Heights, Michigan) was an American professional boxer. Known primarily for his amateur career, during which he already earned his nickname "Wonderful", coming to attention of Howard Cosell, who predicted his bright future as a most likely U.S. Olympic Team light heavyweight for the 1984 Olympics, and a successful professional career afterwards, but both predictions proved unfulfilled, as Womack lost the Olympic qualifiers to Evander Holyfield, and his up-and-coming professional career crumbled after a criminal conviction. Womack committed two armed robberies that resulted in 15 years of prison.

== Early years ==
Womack had a physically abusive father, and neglecting mother. Eventually social services took Ricky along with his seven brothers and sisters away from his mother to a foster care. He started boxing at the age of thirteen with the Kronk Gym, being trained by Emanuel Steward. But troubled childhood deeply affected his personality, he became a staunch kleptomaniac and had frequent brushes with the law enforcement authorities. At that time his teammate, another Kronk's young talent Mark Breland came under Womack's destructive influence. Womack's criminal habits eventually led him to a long term prison sentence.

== Amateur career ==
Womack had a remarkable amateur career, defeating future legend Evander Holyfield several times (one by walkover,) with two of the losses being avenged by Evander at the Olympic Box-offs, and cutting Ricky's way to the 1984 Summer Olympics.

=== Holyfield rivalry ===
Womack jumped into heavyweight already in 1982, winning the AAU Nationals, and proving he's comfortable in that weight class, but he soon came back into light heavyweight, reportedly to prove to his long-lasting nemesis, Holyfield, that he was the better man. As Holyfield later recalled:

— I fought Ricky Womack six times. Ricky Womack was current amateur heavyweight and light heavyweight champion, and he whooped the Cuban, knocked out the Russian, and he was the one that supposed to make the Olympic team. And just so happened I fought him when he was ranked number one as a heavyweight, but he came down to light heavy because he wanted to prove to somebody from Georgia that ain't nobody from Georgia can whoop him. So that mean that he had to fight me. When he came back fought me, I beat him four times, and before he beat me twice, but I beat him four.

— Did you guys ever become friends after that?
— We never had no problem it's just the fact of the matter is that after amateur he ended up going to jail. Then he came out, then he eventually killed himself. He was one of them guys that came up in a bad neighborhood, but he could be warm and bright at times, and sometimes he could just be vicious.
— He was talented though.

— Definitely. Each and every time you fought him, you can probably take a coin to flip it up and say who won it because that's how close it would each and every time. It's not like he stopped me, and not like I stopped him. We had six fights that we went the distance and I remember the last two times to make an Olympic team, in the last fifteen second of the fight he took a breath and I hit him six or seven unanswered punches and I win.

— Evander Holyfield on his amateur fights with Womack

=== Highlights ===
(gold) Boxing at the Ohio State Fair (178 lbs), Columbus, Ohio, August 1982:

- Finals: Defeated Jeff Goff by decision (awarded Gold and Outstanding Fighter)

(gold) United States National Championships (201 lbs), Indianapolis, Indiana, December 1982:

- 1/16: Defeated Bill Soaki RET 3 (Soaki did not answer the 3rd bell)
- 1/8: Defeated Patrick Slade by unanimous decision, 5–0
- 1/4: Defeated Poncho Carter KO 1 (2:59)
- 1/2: Defeated Terry Anderson by majority decision, 4–1 (Anderson was given a standing eight count twice in the 1st rd, and once in the 2nd rd; Womack was given a standing eight count once in the 2nd rd, and twice in the 3rd rd)
- Finals: Defeated Richard Johnson by unanimous decision, 5–0

USA–USSR Duals (178 lbs), Caesars Palace, Las Vegas, Nevada, February 1983:

- Defeated Vitaliy Kachanovskiy (Soviet Union) RSC 1

(gold) National Golden Gloves (178 lbs), Albuquerque, New Mexico, March 1983:

- 1/4: Defeated ? Larson
- 1/2: Defeated Sherman Griffin by decision
- Finals: Defeated Johnny Williams by decision

AIBA International World Championships Challenge (178 lbs), Korakuen Hall, Tokyo, Japan, May 1983:

- Lost to Pablo Romero (Cuba) by majority decision, 1–4

(silver) National Sports Festival (178 lbs), Colorado Springs, Colorado, June 1983:

- 1/2: Defeated Ronnie North by unanimous decision, 5–0
- Finals (Pan Am Trials): Lost to Evander Holyfield by split decision, 2–3

Pan Am Box-Offs (178 lbs), St. Louis, Missouri, August 1983:

- Finals: Lost to Evander Holyfield by decision

(gold) North American Championships (178 lbs), Houston, Texas, September 1983:

- 1/2: Defeated Danny Lindstrom (Canada) DQ 2
- Finals: Defeated Pablo Romero (Cuba) by majority decision, 4–1

(silver) World Cup (178 lbs), Palazzo dello Sport, Rome, Italy, October 1983:

- 1/4: Defeated Lee Hoo Soo (South Korea) by unanimous decision, 5–0
- 1/2: Defeated Paweł Skrzecz (Poland) by walkover
- Finals: Lost to Vitaliy Kachanovskiy (Soviet Union) by majority decision, 1–4

(gold) United States National Championships (178 lbs), Colorado Springs, Colorado, November 1983:

- 1/8: Defeated Sherman Griffin KO 1
- 1/4: Defeated David Lester KO 1
- 1/2: Defeated Evander Holyfield by walkover
- Finals: Defeated Bennie Heard by unanimous decision, 5–0

USA–GDR Duals (178 lbs), Biloxi, Mississippi, November 1983:

- Defeated Andreas Schroth (East Germany) by majority decision, 2–1

USA–Combined Team of GBR & Canada Duals (178 lbs), Reno, Nevada, November 1983:

- Defeated Ken Johnson (Canada) KO 1 (0:50)

AIBA International World Championships Challenge (178 lbs), Memorial Coliseum, Los Angeles, California, April 1984:

- Defeated Pablo Romero (Cuba) RSC 1 (2:49)

National Olympic Trials (178 lbs), Tarrant County Convention Center, Fort Worth, Texas, June 1984:

- 1/4: Defeated Orbit Pough RSC 2
- 1/2: Defeated Evander Holyfield by split decision, 3–2 (one point deducted from Womack in the 3rd rd for leading with his head)
- Finals: Defeated Bennie Heard by unanimous decision, 5–0

Olympic Box-offs (178 lbs), Caesars Palace, Las Vegas, Nevada, July 1984:

- Day 1: Lost to Evander Holyfield by majority decision, 1–4
- Day 2: Lost to Evander Holyfield by majority decision, 1–4 (Womack suffered a broken nose in the 2nd rd)

Afterwards Womack signed a contract with the Kronk boxing team when he turned professional.

Womack finished his amateur career with an estimated record of 54 wins, 14 losses.

== Professional career ==
Womack turned pro in 1984 and began his career with a promising string of victories, including a victory over future champion Uriah Grant, and was undefeated in his first nine bouts until troubles outside of the ring derailed his career.

== Troubles outside the ring ==
Womack was sentenced to 25 years for armed robbery. After serving 15 years, Womack was released in November 2000.

== Comeback ==
After his release, Womack returned to the ring in 2001 and won all four bouts.

== Professional boxing record ==
13 Wins (6 knockouts, 7 decisions), 0 Losses, 1 Draw
Result	Opp Record	Opponent	Type	Round	Date	Location	Notes
Win	13-11-1	(United States) Willie "Wreckless" Chapman	UD	6	23 Nov 2001	The Palace, Auburn Hills, Michigan, United States	Womack committed suicide two months after this fight.
Win	32-22	(United States) Kenny Show	UD	4	24 Jul 2001	Chene Park, Detroit, Michigan, United States	
Win	6-8-1	(Ethiopia) Gesses Mesgana	TKO	4	11 May 2001	Gray's Armory, Cleveland, Ohio, United States	Referee stopped the bout at 1:56 of the fourth round.
Win	10-4	(United States) Curt "Professor" Paige	TKO	3	29 Mar 2001	Cobo Hall, Detroit, Michigan, United States	Referee stopped the bout at 2:28 of the third round.
Served a prison term.
Win	6-2-1	(United States) John "Governor" Smith	TKO	2	3 Dec 1985	Showboat Hotel and Casino, Las Vegas, Nevada, United States	Referee stopped the bout at 2:57 of the second round. Womack would spend 15 years in prison after this fight.
Win	3-1	(Jamaica) Uriah Grant	PTS	6	17 Oct 1985	Star Plaza Theatre, Merrillville, Indiana, United States	
Win	9-7-3	(United States) Billy "The Kid" Saunders	TKO	3	30 Aug 1985	Trump Plaza Hotel and Casino, Atlantic City, New Jersey, United States	Referee stopped the bout at 2:32 of the third round.
Win	11-7	(United States) Dawud Shaw	UD	6	1 Aug 1985	Atlantic City, New Jersey, United States	
Win	3-0-1	(United States) Bob "Lightning" Smith	UD	6	30 Jun 1985	Tropicana Las Vegas, Las Vegas, Nevada, United States	
Win	1-1-1	(United States) David Vedder	UD	6	15 Apr 1985	Caesars Palace, Las Vegas, Nevada, United States	
Win	2-0	(United States) Victor Felder	KO	2	31 Jan 1985	Atlantic City, New Jersey, United States	Felder knocked out at 3:02 of the second round.
Win	1-0	(United States) Jerry Parker	UD	4	19 Oct 1984	Madison Square Garden, New York City, United States	
Win	5-22	(United States) Bill Hollis	TKO	1	15 Sep 1984	Saginaw Civic Center, Saginaw, Michigan, United States	
Draw	3-3-2	(United States) Sonny Jones	PTS	4	26 Jul 1984	Miami Beach Convention Center, Miami Beach, Florida, United States	

== Death ==
On January 19, 2002, Womack committed suicide, two months after his last fight.

Preceded by Mark Mahone	United States Amateur Heavyweight Champion; 1982—1983	Succeeded by Henry Milligan
