= Hilmer Kenty =

American boxer

Personal information
- Born: James Kenty; July 30, 1955 (age 71) Austin, Texas, U.S.
- Height: 5 ft 10 1/2 in (179 cm)
- Weight: Lightweight

Boxing career
- Reach: 72 in (183 cm)
- Stance: Orthodox

Boxing record
- Total fights: 31
- Wins: 29
- Win by KO: 18
- Losses: 2

James Kenty, also known as Hilmer Kenty (born July 30, 1955 in Austin, Texas) is a former professional boxer, best known as the first professional world champion produced by Kronk Gym in Detroit under trainer Emanuel Steward. Kenty is a former WBA lightweight (135lb) champion of the world. He was selected a member of the All-American AAU boxing team for 1973, and was named the top lightweight amateur boxer in the nation in 1973 by the National AAU Boxing Committee.

== Early years ==
Kenty was raised in Columbus, Ohio, and graduated from Linden McKinley High school, where he played on the reserve football team his sophomore year.

== Amateur career ==
Kenty started his amateur boxing career at age 12. He was coached by the greatest amateur coach in history of amateur boxing, Bill Cummings Jr. Kenty won his first Golden Glove's title at age 13. In 1972 Kenty went to the finals of the US Olympic trials in the Bantamweight division(119 pounds), losing on a decision to US Olympic Representative Ricardo Carreras. In 1973 Kenty moved up to the 132 pound lightweight division. In 1974 and 1975 Kenty became the National AAU lightweight champion. In 1975 he was considered and awarded the “Outstanding boxer” of the National AAU tournament.

== Professional career ==
Kenty turned pro in 1977. In 1980, Kenty captured the WBA Lightweight Title with a TKO over Ernesto España, becoming Emanuel Steward's first world champion, and the first world champion from Detroit since Joe Louis decades earlier. Kenty and Thomas Hearns both won WBA belts together and became known as the Motor City Cobras. Kenty defended his belt three times including against Vilomar Fernandez, in a fight in which Kenty suffered a leg injury in round thirteen, before losing it to Sean O'Grady in 1981, and retired in 1984. His only other loss in 31 fights came at the hands of fellow Texan, Roberto Elizondo, by a second round technical knockout when the bout was stopped after Kenty felt ill during the contest.

== Professional boxing record ==
| 31 fights | 29 wins | 2 losses |
|---|---|---|
| By knockout | 18 | 1 |
| By decision | 11 | 1 |

| No. | Result | Record | Opponent | Type | Round, time | Date | Location | Notes |
|---|---|---|---|---|---|---|---|---|
| 31 | Win | 29–2 | Dave Odem | SD | 10 | Aug 16, 1984 | Riverview Ballroom Cobo Arena, Detroit, Michigan, U.S. | |
| 30 | Win | 28–2 | Daniel Cardona | KO | 4 (10) | Jun 28, 1984 | Riverview Ballroom Cobo Arena, Detroit, Michigan, U.S. | |
| 29 | Win | 27–2 | Freddie Pendleton | UD | 10 | Apr 19, 1984 | Cobo Arena, Detroit, Michigan, U.S. | |
| 28 | Win | 26–2 | Sammy Young | TKO | 3 (10) | Mar 10, 1984 | Cobo Arena, Detroit, Michigan, U.S. | |
| 27 | Win | 25–2 | Ali Kareem Muhammad | UD | 10 | Nov 30, 1983 | Sheraton-Southfield Ballroom, Oak Park, Michigan, U.S. | |
| 26 | Win | 24–2 | Ali Kareem Muhammad | PTS | 10 | Aug 13, 1983 | Boardman Sports Complex, Traverse City, Michigan, U.S. | |
| 25 | Win | 23–2 | James Martinez | UD | 10 | Jan 28, 1983 | Yack Arena, Wyandotte, Michigan, U.S. | |
| 24 | Loss | 22–2 | Roberto Elizondo | RTD | 2 (10) | Oct 24, 1982 | Great Gorge Resort, McAfee, New Jersey, U.S. | |
| 23 | Win | 22–1 | John Montes | UD | 10 | Aug 8, 1982 | University of New Mexico, Albuquerque, New Mexico, U.S. | |
| 22 | Win | 21–1 | Chris Fernandez | TKO | 4 (10) | Jun 11, 1982 | Joe Louis Arena, Detroit, Michigan, U.S. | |
| 21 | Loss | 20–1 | Sean O'Grady | UD | 15 | Apr 12, 1981 | Ballys Park Place, Atlantic City, New Jersey, U.S. | Lost WBA lightweight title |
| 20 | Win | 20–0 | Vilomar Fernandez | UD | 15 | Nov 8, 1980 | Cobo Arena, Detroit, Michigan, U.S. | Retained WBA lightweight title |
| 19 | Win | 19–0 | Ernesto España | TKO | 4 (15) | Sep 20, 1980 | Hiram Bithorn Stadium, San Juan, Puerto Rico | Retained WBA lightweight title |
| 18 | Win | 18–0 | Young Ho Oh | TKO | 9 (15) | Aug 2, 1980 | Joe Louis Arena, Detroit, Michigan, U.S. | Retained WBA lightweight title |
| 17 | Win | 17–0 | Ernesto España | TKO | 9 (15) | Mar 2, 1980 | Joe Louis Arena, Detroit, Michigan, U.S. | Won WBA lightweight title |
| 16 | Win | 16–0 | Scotty Foreman | KO | 3 (6) | Nov 30, 1979 | Superdome, New Orleans, Louisiana, U.S. | |
| 15 | Win | 15–0 | Sebastian Mosqueira Gonzalez | TKO | 4 (10) | Oct 18, 1979 | Olympia Stadium, Detroit, Michigan, U.S. | |
| 14 | Win | 14–0 | Bobby Flores | KO | 1 (10) | Aug 23, 1979 | Cobo Arena, Detroit, Michigan, U.S. | |
| 13 | Win | 13–0 | Ralph Racine | UD | 10 | Aug 2, 1979 | Olympia Stadium, Detroit, Michigan, U.S. | |
| 12 | Win | 12–0 | Arturo Leon | UD | 10 | Jun 28, 1979 | Olympia Stadium, Detroit, Michigan, U.S. | |
| 11 | Win | 11–0 | Benny Benitez | TKO | 5 (10) | May 8, 1979 | Center Stage Performing Arts Theater, Canton, Michigan, U.S. | |
| 10 | Win | 10–0 | Alberto Herrera | KO | 4 (10) | Mar 3, 1979 | Olympia Stadium, Detroit, Michigan, U.S. | |
| 9 | Win | 9–0 | Jose Gonzalez | RTD | 7 (10) | Jan 25, 1979 | Olympia Stadium, Detroit, Michigan, U.S. | |
| 8 | Win | 8–0 | Jose Pena | TKO | 3 (10) | Jan 11, 1979 | Olympia Stadium, Detroit, Michigan, U.S. | |
| 7 | Win | 7–0 | Eddie Murray | TKO | 3 (?) | Dec 9, 1978 | Cobo Arena, Detroit, Michigan, U.S. | |
| 6 | Win | 6–0 | Jesse Rogers | KO | 1 (6) | Oct 26, 1978 | Olympia Stadium, Detroit, Michigan, U.S. | |
| 5 | Win | 5–0 | Ron Pettigrew | PTS | 6 | Jul 27, 1978 | Kent State Stark Gym, Canton, Ohio, U.S. | |
| 4 | Win | 4–0 | Mike Gray | TKO | 2 (6) | Apr 17, 1978 | Mershon Auditorium, Columbus, Ohio, U.S. | |
| 3 | Win | 3–0 | Earl Stringer | TKO | 3 (6) | Dec 16, 1977 | Olympia Stadium, Detroit, Michigan, U.S. | |
| 2 | Win | 2–0 | Ray Carrington | RTD | 3 (6) | Nov 26, 1977 | State Fairgrounds, Columbus, Ohio, U.S. | |
| 1 | Win | 1–0 | Steve Homan | PTS | 6 | Oct 13, 1977 | Veterans Memorial Auditorium, Columbus, Ohio, U.S. | |

== See also ==
- Kronk Gym
- List of world lightweight boxing champions

Sporting positions
Amateur boxing titles
| Previous: Aaron Pryor | U.S. lightweight champion 1974, 1975 | Next: Howard Davis Jr. |
World boxing titles
| Preceded by Ernesto España | WBA lightweight champion March 2, 1980 – April 12, 1981 | Succeeded by Sean O'Grady |

== Return to KRONK ==
Kenty remains associated with KRONK Gym as part of the leadership group overseeing the gym's 2025 revival at the Brewster-Wheeler Recreation Center in Detroit.
