= Bottom Creek, West Virginia =

Unincorporated community in West Virginia, United States

Bottom Creek
- Unincorporated community
- Location within the state of West Virginia Bottom Creek (the United States)
- Coordinates: 37°25′12″N 81°29′43″W
- Country: United States
- State: West Virginia
- County: McDowell
- Time zone: UTC-5 (Eastern (EST))
  - Summer (DST): UTC-4 (EDT)
- GNIS feature ID: 1553954

Bottom Creek is an unincorporated community located in McDowell County, West Virginia, United States. Bottom Creek lies along U.S. Route 52 between the towns of Kimball and Vivian. It takes its name from the stream that runs through the community.

== Notable person ==
- Boxing trainer Emanuel Steward was born in Bottom Creek, and spent his early childhood there.
