= Andrew Murray (Guyanese boxer) =

Guyanese boxer

Personal information
- Nickname: The Eagle
- Nationality: Guyanese
- Born: Andrew Murray; 1 July 1971 Georgetown, Guyana
- Died: 26 January 2002 (aged 30)
- Weight: welter/light middle/middleweight

Boxing career
- Stance: Southpaw

Boxing record
- Total fights: 35
- Wins: 27 (KO 17)
- Losses: 7 (KO 4)
- Draws: 1

Andrew "The Eagle" Murray (1 July 1971 – 26 January 2002) born in Georgetown was a Guyanese professional welter/light middle/middleweight boxer of the 1990s and 2000s who won the World Boxing Council (WBC) FECARBOX welterweight title, World Boxing Association (WBA) Fedelatin welterweight title, and Commonwealth welterweight title, and was a challenger for the World Boxing Association (WBA) World welterweight title against Ike Quartey, World Boxing Union (WBU) welterweight title against Michele Piccirillo, and World Boxing Organization (WBO) North American Boxing Organization (NABO) light middleweight title against Fathi Missaoui, his professional fighting weight varied from 145 lb (66 kg; 10 st 5 lb), i.e. welterweight to 156 lb (71 kg; 11 st 2 lb), i.e. middleweight. Andrew Murray was trained by Emanuel Steward, and was the Vice-President of the Guyana Amateur Boxing Board and was training several young boxers, and he had coached Hugo Lewis to the Guyanese super featherweight title on 26 December 2001. Andrew Murray died in a traffic collision on the Soesdyke-Linden Highway early in the morning of Sunday 27 January 2002, he had been in Linden promoting a fight card and was on his way back to Georgetown.
