= Mickey Goodwin =

American boxer (1958–2009)

- Born: September 1, 1958
- Died: March 3, 2009 (aged 50); Melvindale, Michigan, United States

Mickey Goodwin (September 1, 1958 – March 3, 2009) was a Light heavyweight boxer trained by Emanuel Steward at the famed Kronk Gym in Detroit, Michigan.

Goodwin trained under Steward at the Kronk Gym during the same years Thomas "The Hitman" Hearns was training. After starting his career with 29 wins (18 knock outs) and 1 loss, Steward announced on January 5, 1982, he had arranged a fight for Goodwin against Marvin Hagler in Italy on March 6, 1982. Goodwin broke his hand during training and was replaced with William "Caveman" Lee, never again getting a chance for a title fight, despite finishing his career 40-2-1.

== Death ==
On March 3, 2009, Goodwin died of a stroke. Melvindale police initially reported that Goodwin had been beaten to death in his home, but later corrected the cause to a stroke. Goodwin had fallen down a flight of stairs after stroking out, took a shower, went to sleep, and died.
