= Richard Green (referee) =

American boxing referee (1936–1983)

Richard Green (September 1, 1936 – July 1, 1983) was an American professional boxing referee. He officiated several major bouts, such as Larry Holmes vs. Muhammad Ali in 1980. He was the referee for the lightweight world title fight between world lightweight champion Ray Mancini and challenger Duk Koo Kim, which caused Kim's death four days after the fight ended. Green died by suicide eight months later.

== Background ==
Green was a native of Louisiana and a Golden Gloves boxer in the 1960s.

== Career as referee ==
Green presided over several notable fights. One of these was Muhammad Ali's loss to Larry Holmes in 1980.

Green officiated two high-profile fights in 1982. Early in the year, he refereed Wilfred Benítez's fight against Roberto Durán for Benitez's super welterweight title. Later, he was the referee in Ray Mancini's first-round knockout of Arturo Frias, a win that gave Mancini the WBA lightweight championship.

On November 13, 1982, Green was assigned to work Mancini's second defense of that title, a match against Korean contender Duk-Koo Kim that was televised across the nation by CBS. The fight ended when Green stopped it after Kim was knocked down early in the fourteenth round, but Kim had taken a severe beating from Mancini throughout the fight and collapsed in the ring shortly thereafter. Four days after the fight, Kim died of massive brain injuries.

The Kim-Mancini bout proved to be a watershed in boxing, triggering a series of major changes to the sport. Championship bouts were reduced from 15 to 12 rounds, the standing eight count was introduced, and fighters had to undergo more stringent medical tests before a match.

Green's last fight was a USBA Heavyweight Championship fight on May 20, 1983, that saw Greg Page defeat Renaldo Snipes in a 12-round decision. Six weeks later, Green was found dead in his North Las Vegas home. The coroner ruled the death a suicide via self-inflicted gunshot.
