= Andrew Ganigan =

American boxer

Andrew (Andy) "Hawaiian Punch" Ganigan (September 3, 1952 – May 2, 2012) was an American former lightweight boxer of Filipino descent. He was renowned for his punching ability, being named #97 in The Ring's list of 100 greatest punchers of all time. Ganigan fought from 1972 to 1983, ending his career with an overall record of 34 wins (30 by KO) and 5 losses. He was a southpaw.

== Biography ==
Ganigan was born September 3, 1952, in Waipahu, Hawaii.

Ganigan captured the NABF lightweight title by scoring a TKO in 8 rounds over Vicente Mijares on March 28, 1978. He lost that title to Johnny Lira on a 6-round KO on August 1, 1978, but recaptured the crown from Mijares on March 27, 1979, by winning a unanimous 12-round decision. Ganigan also won the World Athletic Association (WAA) lightweight crown by scoring a KO in 2 rounds over Sean O'Grady on October 31, 1981.

Ganigan then challenged legendary boxer Alexis Argüello on May 22, 1982, for the WBC lightweight crown. Ganigan knocked Arguello down in the first round, but was KOed in round 5. Ganigan's last fight was an unsuccessful attempt to take the USBA lightweight crown from Jimmy Paul on June 6, 1983. Paul stopped Ganigan on a 6-round TKO.

He was inducted in to the Hawaii Sports Hall of Fame in 2000.

An attack in 2010 left him severely injured, and he never fully recovered. Ganigan died of liver cancer in Las Vegas on May 2, 2012.

Sporting positions
Minor world boxing titles
Preceded by Sean O'Grady	WAA lightweight champion October 31, 1981 – May 22, 1982; Vacated	Vacant Title next held by Leon Moore
