= Roberto Elizondo =

American lightweight boxer

Roberto Elizondo (born December 28, 1955) is an American former professional boxer of Mexican descent. Elizondo competed in the sport of professional boxing from 1977 to 1987, and he fought for the World Boxing Council's world Lightweight title twice, both times challenging unsuccessfully. Elizondo, from Corpus Christi, Texas, is a member of the Corpus Christi Boxing Hall of Fame.

== Professional boxing career ==
Elizondo debuted on Tuesday, April 5, 1977, in the main event of an undercard held at the Lantana Sports Complex in Corpus Christi, against 4 wins, 8 losses Rodolfo Perez. In this fight, Elizondo scored his first knockout win, beating Perez in the first round. Elizondo began his professional boxing career with a hot streak, winning his first seven fights, six by knockout. This included his first fight outside Corpus Christi, when he met 2 wins, one loss Juan Venegas on August 15, 1978, in Houston, whom Elizondo beat by third-round knockout. On his eighth contest, Elizondo somewhat surprisingly experienced his first loss as a professional boxer, beaten by a seventh-round knockout by the debuting Viterbo Romas as part of a program headlined by future world title challenger Wilford Scypion, also in Houston.

Elizondo responded to that first defeat with a streak of 16 wins in a row, including a ten rounds unanimous decision win over Arturo Leon, 26-16-2 before their contest, on his second bout after the loss to Romas, in a fight held at Corpus Christi's Memorial Coliseum on August 7, 1979, his first fight as a professional boxer outside Texas when he traveled to Los Angeles, California to meet 31 wins, 16 losses and 1 draw (tie) Don Sennett at the Olympic Auditorium in the main event of a program held on March 13, 1980, in a fight in which Elizondo emerged victorious by first-round knockout, a second-round knockout of Norman Goins in another main event at the Olympic Auditorium on August 7 of the same year and a ten rounds unanimous decision win against 44-13-1 James Martinez back in Corpus Christi on September 2, 1980. By this time, Elizondo had become a fan favorite both among California and Texas boxing fans. On December 19, 1980, Elizondo made his Las Vegas, Nevada debut when he fought 13 wins-11 losses and 3 draws trial horse Jesus Salcedo as part of a program headlined by the World Boxing Council's world Bantamweight championship fight between Lupe Pintor and Alberto Davila (which champion Pintor won by 15 rounds majority decision), Elizondo beating Salcedo by third-round knockout.

=== Challenge of Alexis Arguello ===
After three more wins following the victory over Salcedo, Elizondo challenged Nicaragua's Alexis Arguello for Arguello's WBC world Lightweight championship. A very publicized event happened to Arguello as he was training for the fight in Tucson, Arizona days before the contest: He was sent to a local gym by a Tucson native, but the gym was available to local police athletic league athletes only. When the police arrived at the location, they kicked Arguello and his team out of the location. The group left the premises without further incident.

A few days after, the contest came off. Fought on November 21, 1981, at the Showboat Hotel and Casino in Las Vegas, it was contested at a brisk pace for most of its duration, with Elizondo showing an aggressive style and pinning the champion against the ropes from time to time. In round four, however, Arguello dropped Elizondo to the floor for the first time, with a counter-punch. Elizondo recovered, but Arguello underlined his dominance in round seven when he dropped Elizondo with a right to the chin for the first knockdown in that round and second in the fight. Elizondo got up again but Arguello proceeded to connect with a left to Elizondo's body and a right that graced Elizondo's head, sending him down for the second time in the round and third time in the bout. Elizondo crawled to a sitting position but was counted out by referee Joey Curtis seven seconds after the bell had sounded to finish round seven, giving Arguello a seventh-round knockout at the official time of 3 minutes and 7 seconds, Arguello retaining the WBC world Lightweight title.

Years later, Elizondo alleged, on an interview that was published on American boxing writer Christian Giudice's book about Arguello named "Beloved Warrior", that he had broken one of his teeth on one of the first two falls he suffered during the fight; Elizondo, according to himself, had to await two days to get it fixed at a dental office.

The championship defeat at the hands of Arguello was followed by another contest against a world caliber opponent, this time former WBC world Junior Lightweight champion Cornelius Boza-Edwards, an Ugandan who was by now a United States resident. Boza-Edwards had 35 wins and three losses when he and Elizondo fought on June 26, 1982, at the Showboat Hotel in Las Vegas. Boza-Edwards pulled a close but unanimous decision win over the Mexican-American, winning the fight on the three judges' scorecards by scores of 96-94 (twice) and 97–93 in his favor.

Elizondo went on with his career and, after a win against inexperienced Romero Sandoval (who only had 6 previous professional boxing fights before facing Elizondo), the Texan scored what was probably his biggest career victory: faced with former World Boxing Association world Lightweight champion Hilmer Kenty on October 24, 1982, at the Great Gorge Resort in McAfee, New Jersey, Elizondo dominated the former champion, who was 22-1 coming into their contest and whose lone loss had been in his title losing effort to Sean O'Grady one year before, to score a second-round knockout. Kenty was apparently physically hurt during the second round and quit on his stool before the start of the third. Because Kenty quit before the start of round three, Elizondo was credited with a second-round knockout. Kenty later retired with only his fights with O'Grady and Elizondo as losses.

=== Challenge of Edwin Rosario ===
Elizondo had three more wins, one by knockout, over mostly obscure opposition, before he was able to again challenge for the WBC world Lightweight championship. His bout with undefeated Edwin Rosario, 22–0 with 20 knockout wins coming in, received much attention in Puerto Rico and abroad with magazines like Ring En Español and others speculating about it since Elizondo had given Rosario's precursor as WBC world champion Alexis Arguello such a good fight. Elizondo-Rosario was Elizondo's second world championship fight and also his first fight held abroad, as it came off at the Hiram Bithorn Stadium in San Juan, Puerto Rico, on March 17, 1984, as the main event of a program that also included fights by future world champions such as Rosario's future rival Juan Nazario, Wilfredo Vazquez and Julian Jackson as well as one bout between Alberto Mercado and Osvaldo Acevedo.

Despite fighting gallantly (getting up from two quick knockdowns) Elizondo was dominated by the Puerto Rican; the fight being stopped by American referee Davey Pearl after the second knockdown. Rosario retained the world title by a first-round technical knockout.

=== Rest of career ===
Elizondo had six more bouts after his second unsuccessful world title challenge, scoring four wins and two losses in that span. Two notable fights were one with undefeated Frankie Warren, a fellow Corpus Christi resident and member also of the Corpus Christi Boxing Hall of Fame who was on his way to one International Boxing Federation world title challenge and who beat Elizondo by seventh-round knockout in the main event of a January 19, 1986 bout at the Memorial Coliseum at Corpus Christi, and another one, on February 8, 1987, against the future multiple times world champion, legendary, 21-1 Vinny Paz, which took place at the Civic Center in Providence, Rhode Island. Despite giving Paz a tough test, Elizondo was stopped with three seconds left in the fight, losing the contest by a tenth-round technical knockout.

Elizondo's next fight was his last; he took on 24-5-1 prospect John Sinegal as part of a program headlined by future International Boxing Hall of Fame member Daniel Zaragoza at the Memorial Coliseum in Corpus Christi on July 31, 1987. He stopped Sinegal with a second-round technical knockout after dropping him three times.

== Career in review ==
A two time world championship challenger, Elizondo retired with a record of 32 wins and 6 losses in 38 professional boxing fights, with 23 victories and 5 defeats by way of knockout. Both world champions that Elizondo challenged for a world title and lost to, Alexis Arguello and Edwin "Chapo" Rosario, have been inducted as members of the International Boxing Hall of Fame.
