= Ray Cattouse =

English boxer

Personal information
- Nationality: British
- Born: 24 July 1952 (age 73) Balham, London, England
- Weight: Lightweight

Boxing career

Boxing record
- Total fights: 31
- Wins: 26
- Win by KO: 11
- Losses: 2
- Draws: 3

Ray Cattouse (born 24 July 1952) is a British former boxer who was British lightweight champion between 1980 and 1982 and fought for the European title.

== Career ==
Born in Balham, London, and managed by Terry Lawless, Cattouse made his professional debut in September 1975, a points defeat to Barton McAllister. He was unbeaten in his next 18 fights, leading to a challenge for Johnny Claydon's BBBofC Southern Area lightweight title, the fight also an eliminator for the British title. Cattouse won, and went on to meet Dave McCabe in March 1980 for the British title. Cattouse stopped McCabe in the eighth round to become British champion.

Cattouse successfully defended the title a year later against McCabe, stopping him in the fifteenth and final round. In February 1982 Cattouse challenged for Giuseppe Gibilisco's European title in Italy, the fight ending in a draw. He made his second defence of the British title in October 1982, losing it after being stopped in the fourteenth round by George Feeney, only the second defeat of Cattouse's career and a contest that was hailed as the fight of the year.

He fought twice in 1983, a win over Willie Booth and a draw with Paul Chance, and was due to meet Rene Weller for the European title in February 1985, but the fight didn't happen and Cattouse retired from the sport.
