= Orlando Romero =

Peruvian boxer (born 1959)

Personal information
- Nickname: Romerito
- Born: Orlando Romero Peralta; July 13, 1959 (age 67) Trujillo, Peru
- Height: 5 ft 6 in (168 cm)
- Weight: Lightweight

Boxing career
- Reach: 173cm (68in)
- Stance: Southpaw

Boxing record
- Total fights: 39
- Wins: 35
- Win by KO: 12
- Losses: 3
- Draws: 1
- No contests: 0

Orlando Romero Peralta (born March 3, 1959) is a former boxer from Peru. Nicknamed "Romerito" he was one of South America's top ranked lightweights during the 1980s.

== Professional boxing career ==
Orlando Romero began his professional career as a boxer on February 24, 1979, defeating Rafael Pando by a six round decision in Lima.

Romero won his first four bouts, then drew (tied) with Miguel Macias after six rounds, on July 21. Only two weeks later, on August 3, he started another winning streak, when he beat Luis Carhuamaca by decision in six, also in Lima.

On October 22, he had his first bout outside Lima, when he knocked out Carlos Soriano in the second round at Trujillo. After four additional wins, Romero returned to Lima, where he defeated Domingo Gonzalez on April 19, 1980, by a knockout in six rounds, to win the Peruvian national Lightweight title.

After two more victories, Romero added the Latin American Lightweight title with a twelve round decision victory over Leonidas Asprilla, who also fought Aaron Pryor, by a decision in twelve, on September 20 in Lima.

Romero had fourteen more victories in a row before challenging Ray Mancini for the WBA world Lightweight title. Among the fighters he beat were Oscar Huertas (twice), Antonio Cruz (against whom Romero retained the Latin American Lightweight title by a twelve-rounds decision on May 17, 1982, in Lima) and Jerome Artis.

On September 15, 1983, Romero had his first world title try, and his first fight abroad, when he challenged Mancini for the WBA world Lightweight championship, at New York's Madison Square Garden. Romero was attempting to become Peru's first world boxing champion in history. After eight rounds, the fight was close, with one judge (Nicasio Drake), having it a 77–77 tie, while two judges, (Ismael W. Fernandez and Yusaku Yoshida) having Mancini ahead by 77–76 and 79–77, respectively, but Mancini retained the title when he knocked Romero out in the ninth round. Having won 26 bouts in a row, Romero had been inflicted his first defeat as a professional boxer.

Romero gained some celebrity outside Peru after this bout, with Ring En Español dedicating various articles to the Peruvian boxer. On January 14, 1984, he outpointed former Samuel Serrano world title challenger Benedicto Villablanca over ten rounds in Trujillo. He followed that win with a ten-round decision on May 4 over Robert Mullins, who had also boxed Héctor Camacho.

After one more win, he lost to another well-known Peruvian boxer, the then up and coming Geronimo Luque, by a knockout in nine rounds on December 1, at Lima.

Romero won two of his last three fights, before losing his last contest, to namesake and countryman Orlando Romero Uribe. He then retired from professional boxing.

Romero won 35 bouts, losing 3 and drawing (tying) in 1, with 12 wins by knockout.

== After boxing ==
In 1998, Romero moved to Spain, where he managed a Peruvian food restaurant.

In 2013, he was named "honorary world champion" by the World Boxing Association during a convention held in Lima, Peru, during which he and Ray Mancini reunited.

After that he opened a night club called "El Timbalero" in Madrid, Spain.
