= Johnny Lira =

American boxer

Personal information
- Nickname: World Class Pug
- Born: July 31, 1951 Chicago, Illinois, U.S.
- Died: December 8, 2012 (aged 61) Chicago, Illinois, U.S.
- Height: 5 ft 9 in (175 cm)
- Weight: Lightweight; Light welterweight Welterweight

Boxing career
- Reach: 69 in (175 cm)
- Stance: Orthodox

Boxing record
- Total fights: 37
- Wins: 30
- Win by KO: 15
- Losses: 6
- Draws: 1

Johnny Lira (July 31, 1951 – December 8, 2012) was a professional lightweight and welterweight boxing contender who was born and died in Chicago, Illinois.

Lira won the Chicago Novice Golden Gloves championship at middleweight. As a professional, Lira went on to win the United States Boxing Association lightweight title by knocking out undefeated, Andrew Ganigan in the sixth round in August 1978, having started his pro career undefeated in his first 18 professional bouts. In August 1979, Lira fought for the World Boxing Association Lightweight title and lost to then champion Ernesto Espana in his only world title opportunity. Before losing, Lira had knocked Espana down to the canvas, but was unable to finish him. Lira boxed professionally from 1976 to 1984, compiling a record of 30 wins, 6 losses, and 1 draw, with 15 knockouts. Lira retired at age 34 after a ten round decision loss to Russell Mitchell in Illinois in 1984.

== Life after boxing ==
Lira later underwent liver transplant surgery to save his life. Appearing in relatively good health for many years after 'the fight of his life', Lira taught amateur boxing to children at the Union League Boys and Girls Club, and made public appearances at boxing cards in the Chicago area. Lira died of Stage 3 of 4 CTE (not liver disease as many think) at age 61 in his native Chicago, Illinois, on Saturday, December 8, 2012. His brain was donated to Boston University, where CTE was observed. He was survived by his four children: three daughters and a son.
