= Kronk Gym =

Boxing gym in Detroit, Michigan, United States

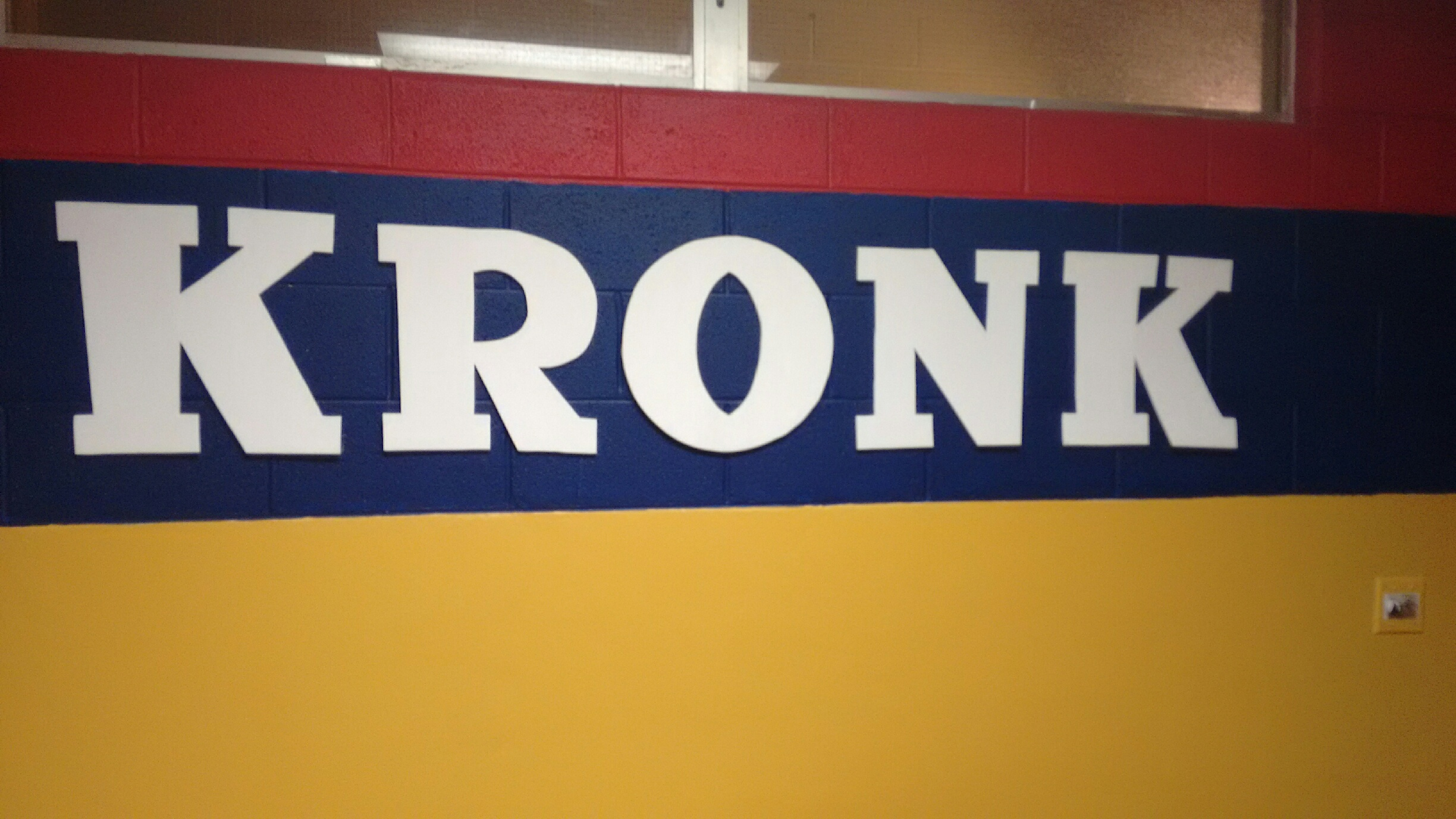
Logo on wall in locker room of new gym location

KRONK Gym is a boxing gym located in Detroit, once led by trainer Emanuel Steward. It was originally run out of the basement of the oldest recreation center of the City of Detroit.

Named after Detroit City Councilman John Kronk, the training facility opened in 1921. The original site closed in 2006, but it reopened in 2015.

== History ==
=== Original Detroit gym ===
During the late 1970s, prospects like Hilmer Kenty, Thomas Hearns and Mickey Goodwin trained there. In 1980, Kenty became KRONK's first world champion, Hearns following him months after. In 1983, KRONK fighter Milton McCrory won the WBC welterweight title vacated by Sugar Ray Leonard; Jimmy Paul beat Harry Arroyo for the International Boxing Federation's world lightweight title in 1985. Duane Thomas, another KRONK fighter, beat John Mugabi for the WBC light middleweight title in 1986. McCrory's brother, Steve McCrory, was also a world champion who as an amateur won the flyweight gold medal at the 1984 Summer Olympics in Los Angeles. In 1984 four KRONK team members of various weight classes were ranked world's top ten by AIBA: Steve McCrory #1 at 112 lbs, Mark Breland #1 at 147 lbs, Frank Tate #5 at 156 lbs, and Ricky Womack #3 at 178 lbs.

KRONK opened a second gym in Tucson, Arizona during the 1990s.

=== Detroit gym closure ===
In September 2006, the original gym at 5555 McGraw Avenue between 33rd and Junction Streets in Detroit closed temporarily after thieves stole copper water pipes, cutting off supply to the building. Boxers relocated to a Dearborn Gold's Gym. A "Save the KRONK" campaign aimed at keeping the facilities from closing due to budget shortfall was spearheaded by Emanuel Steward. The campaign would ultimately work toward building a new KRONK.

The gym and recreation center was officially closed by the Recreation Department on November 28, 2006, due to the prohibitive cost of repairs to the plumbing and building infrastructure.

In the past few years, the Detroit gym relocated to a new facility in a storefront on West Warren Avenue.

On October 7, 2017, the original KRONK Gym roof was destroyed and the basement gym was heavily damaged in a fire.

=== Reopening ===
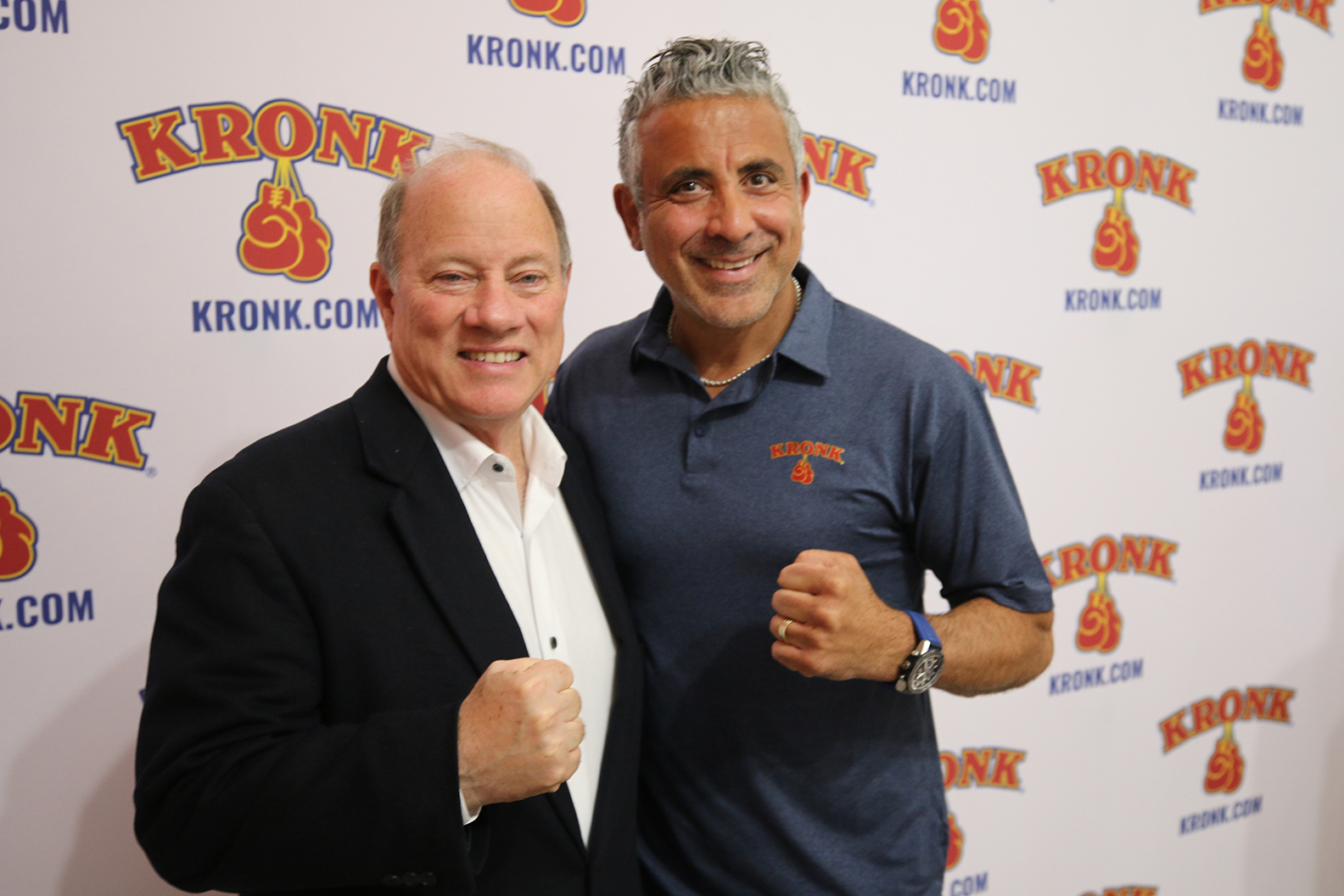
Paul Bhatti and Detroit Mayor Mike Duggan at the KRONK Gym reopening press conference, Brewster-Wheeler Recreation Center, June 4, 2025

KRONK Gym CEO Paul Bhatti with KRONK first world champion Hilmer Kenty holding original World Champion fight jacket

The new facility opened on Memorial Day weekend in 2015 at 9520 Mettetal St.

On August 20, 2020, during the COVID-19 pandemic and subsequent restrictions on sports events, the gym hosted its first ever professional boxing event, a long-time dream held by Steward. The card was headlined by KRONK fighter Vladimir Shishkin who defeated Oscar Riojas via ninth-round technical knockout.

=== Closing ===
The gym at 9520 Mettetal St, operated for several years and hosted both professional and amateur fighters. In 2020, the building was forced to close after sustaining significant flooding damage, and operations were discontinued at that site.

=== 2025 return to Detroit ===
In late 2025, KRONK Gym returned to Detroit, reopening in the historic Brewster‑Wheeler Recreation Center at 670 Wilkins .
