= Arturo Frias =

American boxer

Personal information
- Nickname: Art
- Born: October 27, 1955 (age 70) Montebello, California, U.S.
- Height: 5 ft 7 in (170 cm)
- Weight: Lightweight

Boxing career
- Reach: 67 in (170 cm)
- Stance: Orthodox

Boxing record
- Total fights: 33
- Wins: 28
- Win by KO: 8
- Losses: 5

Arturo Frias (born October 27, 1955) is an American former professional boxer wwas the WBA lightweight champion of the world from 1981 to 1982.

== Boxing career ==
Frias began his professional boxing career on February 7, 1975, one month and a half after he had turned eighteen years old. He beat Alfredo Medrano by a six round decision in San Diego that night. He made his Los Angeles debut defeating Victor de La Cruz on March 17 of that year. On his third fight, Frias obtained a six round technical decision win over Eddie Murray, who quadrupled Frias' experience, having held eight fights before their bout, compared to Frias' two fights. Murray was undefeated before losing to Frias.

On Frias' eighth bout, he won once again by a technical decision, defeating Basilio Onate in two rounds, on September 2, 1976, also in Los Angeles. Frias' first knockout victory came on his tenth fight, when he defeated Canelo Salinas in the second round on December 16 of that year.

On February 26, 1981, Frias entered the WBA's top ten rankings at the Lightweight division, with a ten round decision win over Jaime Nava, in Los Angeles. On May 30, he held his first fight abroad, and suffered his first professional defeat, at the hands of former world champion Ernesto España, who outpointed Frias over ten rounds in Caracas, Venezuela.

Despite suffering his first professional defeat, Frias was not dropped from the WBA's rankings at the Lightweight division, and, after two more wins, he received his first world title try, against WBA lightweight champion Claude Noel, on December 5 of 1981, in Las Vegas.

Frias, who was not generally known as a heavy hitter, became world champion when he knocked Noel out in the eighth round. On his first defense, held on January 30, 1982, in Los Angeles, he avenged his defeat to former world champion España, beating the Venezuelan by a nine round technical decision.

Frias then signed to defend his crown against Ray Mancini. An unclarified incident happened weeks before the fight, when some armed men came looking for Mancini at his hotel room as he trained for his challenge of Frias in the city of Tucson, Arizona. Frias himself was never signaled as a suspect in the incident, and Mancini-Frias took place on May 8, 1982, in Las Vegas. In what was often called the best first round in boxing history (until Marvin Hagler beat Thomas Hearns three years later), Frias wobbled Mancini and bloodied the challenger's nose in the fight's opening minute, only to have Mancini drop him and win the fight by knockout in the last minute of the first round.

On July 18 of that year, Frias bid for the USBA Lightweight title, losing by a fifth round knockout to Ruben Muñoz Jr., in Atlantic City, New Jersey.

Frias obtained four more victories before facing former world title challenger Kelvin Lampkins, on December 13, 1984, in Bakersfield. He lost by a ninth round knockout to Lampkins.

His next fight was also highly anticipated, as he faced former two division world champion and fellow Chicano Bobby Chacon, on August 15, 1985, in Sacramento. Despite dropping Chacon in the first round, Frias lost by a seventh round knockout.

Arturo Frias retired after that bout, with a record of 28 wins and 5 losses in 33 bouts, with 8 wins by knockout. He currently resides in Whittier, CA.

== Professional boxing record ==
33 fights	28 wins	5 losses
By knockout	8	4
By decision	20	1

No.	Result	Record	Opponent	Type	Round, time	Date	Location	Notes
33	Loss	28–5	Bobby Chacon	TKO	7 (10)	1985-08-15	Memorial Auditorium, Sacramento, California, U.S.	
32	Loss	28–4	Kelvin Lampkin	TKO	9 (10)	1984-12-13	Civic Auditorium, Bakersfield, California, U.S.	
31	Win	28–3	Jose Torres	UD	10 (10)	1984-06-15	Caesars Palace, Paradise, Nevada, U.S.	
30	Win	27–3	Jerry Lewis	TD	4 (10)	1983-08-04	Circle Star Theatre, San Carlos, California, U.S.	
29	Win	26–3	Javier Rios	TKO	3 (10)	1983-04-12	County Fairgrounds, Ventura, California, U.S.	
28	Win	25–3	Joe Perez	UD	10 (10)	1983-02-09	County Fairgrounds, Ventura, California, U.S.	
27	Loss	24–3	Ruben Munoz Jr	TKO	5 (12)	1982-07-18	Tropicana Hotel & Casino, Atlantic City, New Jersey, U.S.	For vacant USBA lightweight title
26	Loss	24–2	Ray Mancini	TKO	1 (15)	1982-05-08	Aladdin, Paradise, Nevada, U.S.	Lost WBA lightweight title
25	Win	24–1	Ernesto España	TD	9 (15)	1982-01-30	Olympic Auditorium, Los Angeles, California, U.S.	Retained WBA lightweight title
24	Win	23–1	Claude Noel	KO	8 (15)	1981-12-05	Showboat Hotel & Casino Sports Pavilion, Las Vegas, Nevada, U.S.	Won WBA lightweight title
23	Win	22–1	Juan Graciano	TKO	5 (10)	1981-10-29	Olympic Auditorium, Los Angeles, California, U.S.	
22	Win	21–1	Rosendo Ramirez	UD	10 (10)	1981-08-27	Olympic Auditorium, Los Angeles, California, U.S.	
21	Loss	20–1	Ernesto España	MD	10 (10)	1981-05-30	Caracas, Venezuela	
20	Win	20–0	Robert Perez	KO	2 (10)	1981-04-30	Olympic Auditorium, Los Angeles, California, U.S.	
19	Win	19–0	Jaime Nava	PTS	10 (10)	1981-02-26	Olympic Auditorium, Los Angeles, California, U.S.	
18	Win	18–0	Guillermo Arreola	PTS	10 (10)	1980-08-14	Olympic Auditorium, Los Angeles, California, U.S.	
17	Win	17–0	Juan Sanchez	KO	1 (10)	1980-06-26	Olympic Auditorium, Los Angeles, California, U.S.	
16	Win	16–0	Fidel Fraijo	PTS	10 (10)	1978-05-18	Olympic Auditorium, Los Angeles, California, U.S.	
15	Win	15–0	Ray Saldivar	UD	10 (10)	1977-12-01	Olympic Auditorium, Los Angeles, California, U.S.	
14	Win	14–0	Juan Arcos	KO	3 (6)	1977-07-28	Olympic Auditorium, Los Angeles, California, U.S.	
13	Win	13–0	Enrique Paz	KO	1 (6)	1977-03-10	Olympic Auditorium, Los Angeles, California, U.S.	
12	Win	12–0	Raul Monge	PTS	6 (6)	1977-02-24	Olympic Auditorium, Los Angeles, California, U.S.	
11	Win	11–0	Eduardo Parra	PTS	6 (6)	1977-02-10	Olympic Auditorium, Los Angeles, California, U.S.	
10	Win	10–0	Canelo Salinas	TKO	2 (5)	1976-12-16	Olympic Auditorium, Los Angeles, California, U.S.	
9	Win	9–0	Jesus Monrreal	PTS	4 (4)	1976-10-28	Olympic Auditorium, Los Angeles, California, U.S.	
8	Win	8–0	Basilio Onate	TD	2 (?)	1976-09-02	Olympic Auditorium, Los Angeles, California, U.S.	
7	Win	7–0	Rafael Preciado	UD	7 (7)	1975-11-15	Olympic Auditorium, Los Angeles, California, U.S.	
6	Win	6–0	Martin Avila	PTS	5 (5)	1975-10-25	Olympic Auditorium, Los Angeles, California, U.S.	
5	Win	5–0	Isidro Salinas	PTS	6 (6)	1975-09-20	Olympic Auditorium, Los Angeles, California, U.S.	
4	Win	4–0	Jorge Mejia	PTS	4 (4)	1975-06-20	Forum, Inglewood, California, U.S.	
3	Win	3–0	Eddie Murray	TD	6 (6)	1975-05-01	Olympic Auditorium, Los Angeles, California, U.S.	
2	Win	2–0	Victor de la Cruz	PTS	6 (6)	1975-04-17	Olympic Auditorium, Los Angeles, California, U.S.	
1	Win	1–0	Alfredo Medrano	UD	6 (6)	1975-02-07	Coliseum, San Diego, California, U.S.	

== See also ==
- List of world lightweight boxing champions

Sporting positions
World boxing titles
Preceded by Claude Noel	WBA lightweight champion December 5, 1981 – May 8, 1982	Succeeded by Ray Mancini
