= George Feeney (boxer) =

British former boxer

Personal information
- Nationality: British
- Born: 9 February 1957 (age 69) Hartlepool, England
- Height: 5 ft 8 in (173 cm)
- Weight: Lightweight

Boxing career

Boxing record
- Total fights: 29
- Wins: 19
- Win by KO: 8
- Losses: 10

George Feeney (born 9 February 1957) is a British former boxer who was British lightweight champion between 1982 and his retirement in 1984.

== Career ==
Born in Hartlepool, Feeney learned to box at the Boys Welfare gym, and made his professional debut in August 1977. He won ten of his first fifteen fights, which also included defeats to more experienced boxers including Cornelius Boza-Edwards and Clinton McKenzie.

In October 1980, he faced Ricky Beaumont in a British lightweight title eliminator and lost a narrow points decision. In March 1981, he stopped Winston Spencer in the ninth round of another title eliminator; and in January, 1982, beat Ken Buchanan on points in what was the latter's final (official) fight.

He got his shot at the British title in October that year, against defending champion Ray Cattouse at the Royal Albert Hall. In a closely fought contest, Feeney emerged the winner, after stopping Cattouse in the fourteenth round to become the new champion.

In 1983, he travelled to Italy, where he took Ray Mancini the distance in a close fight in March. Feeney was decisively beaten on points the following month, however, by Howard Davis Jr.

Back in England he made the first defence of his British title in December, 1983 against Tony Willis, stopping the challenger in the first round. He made a second successful defence in February 1984 against Paul Chance, winning the Lonsdale Belt outright.

Pursuing the European title, he travelled to Frankfurt in October 1984 to challenge Rene Weller. The fight went the distance, with defending champion Weller retaining his title. Feeney suffered a detached retina. This proved to be Feeney's final fight, and he retired after eye surgery in 1985. Feeney's younger brother, John Feeney, was British bantamweight champion between 1983 and 1985.
