= Ernesto España =

Venezuelan boxer

Personal information
- Born: November 7, 1954 (age 71) La Flor, Venezuela
- Height: 5 ft 11 in (180 cm)
- Weight: Lightweight

Boxing career
- Reach: 72 in (183 cm)
- Stance: Orthodox

Boxing record
- Total fights: 44
- Wins: 36
- Win by KO: 29
- Losses: 8

Ernesto España (born November 7, 1954) is a Venezuelan former professional boxer who held the World Boxing Association lightweight championship in 1979 and 1980.

== Career ==
España became a professional boxer in 1975 and initially won all of his bouts except one, including one in 1981, when he beat future champion Arturo Frias. España fought Claude Noel on June 16, 1979, for the vacant WBA lightweight title that had been given up by Roberto Durán. España knocked out Noel in the thirteenth round to win the title. He defended it once, recuperating from a knockdown in round seven before knocking out Johnny Lira in round nine of a fight which has been showcased on ESPN Classic, before losing the title to Hilmer Kenty by knockout in round nine in March 1980. In a rematch in September, Kenty knocked España out again, this time in the fourth round.

For a period during this era, España was a resident of Puerto Rico.

When Frias won the WBA lightweight title, España challenged him but Frias avenged his only loss and won a technical decision over España in 1982.

España's next fight was another challenge for the WBA lightweight title, but this time Ray Mancini knocked him out in six rounds in July 1982. España never challenged for a world title again and retired in 1988.

== Professional boxing record ==
44 fights	36 wins	8 losses
By knockout	29	3
By decision	7	5

No.	Result	Record	Opponent	Type	Round, Time	Date	Location	Notes
44	Loss	36–8	Michael Benjamin	UD	12	Aug 29, 1988	National Park, Georgetown, Guyana	For vacant WBC Continental Americas lightweight title
43	Loss	36–7	Lester Ellis	UD	10	Mar 13, 1987	Melbourne Town Hall, Melbourne, Australia	
42	Win	36–6	Junel Rodriguez	PTS	12	Jun 1, 1985	Caracas, Venezuela	Won vacant WBC FECARBOX lightweight title
41	Loss	35–6	Rafael Williams	MD	10	Jan 19, 1985	Arena Panama Al Brown, Colón City, Panama	
40	Loss	35–5	Ray Mancini	TKO	6 (15), 2:59	Jul 24, 1982	Mollenkopf Stadium, Warren, Ohio, U.S.	For WBA lightweight title
39	Loss	35–4	Arturo Frias	TD	9 (15), 0:26	Jan 30, 1982	Olympic Auditorium, Los Angeles, California, U.S.	For WBA lightweight title; Unanimous technical decision
38	Win	35–3	Eduardo Iriarte	PTS	10	Nov 17, 1981	Caracas, Venezuela	
37	Win	34–3	Jose Rosas	TKO	5 (10)	Oct 26, 1981	Caracas, Venezuela	
36	Win	33–3	Alvin Fowler	TKO	3 (10)	Aug 24, 1981	Caracas, Venezuela	
35	Win	32–3	Jong Kil Chung	TKO	6 (10)	Jul 20, 1981	Caracas, Venezuela	
34	Win	31–3	Arturo Frias	MD	10	May 30, 1981	Caracas, Venezuela	
33	Win	30–3	Jose Ortiz	KO	2 (10)	May 9, 1981	Caracas, Venezuela	
32	Win	29–3	Ki Hoon Kwak	KO	5 (10)	Apr 13, 1981	Caracas, Venezuela	
31	Win	28–3	Eduardo Iriarte	PTS	10	Feb 21, 1981	El Poliedro, Caracas, Venezuela	
30	Loss	27–3	Hilmer Kenty	TKO	4 (15), 2:57	Sep 20, 1980	Hiram Bithorn Stadium, San Juan, Puerto Rico	For WBA lightweight title
29	Loss	27–2	Hilmer Kenty	TKO	9 (15), 2:53	Mar 2, 1980	Joe Louis Arena, Detroit, Michigan, U.S.	Lost WBA lightweight title
28	Win	27–1	Johnny Lira	RTD	9 (15), 3:00	Aug 4, 1979	Conrad Hilton Hotel, Chicago, Illinois, U.S.	Retained WBA lightweight title
27	Win	26–1	Claude Noel	KO	13 (15)	Jun 16, 1979	Roberto Clemente Coliseum, San Juan, Puerto Rico	Won vacant WBA lightweight title
26	Win	25–1	Eddie Bracetty	TKO	1 (10)	Mar 25, 1979	Hiram Bithorn Stadium, San Juan, Puerto Rico	
25	Win	24–1	Fernando Jimenez	TKO	6 (10)	Feb 19, 1979	San Juan, Puerto Rico	
24	Win	23–1	Johnny Barr	KO	1 (10)	Oct 28, 1978	Roberto Clemente Coliseum, San Juan, Puerto Rico	
23	Win	22–1	Bienvenido Quinto	TKO	1 (10)	Sep 9, 1978	Hiram Bithorn Stadium, San Juan, Puerto Rico	
22	Win	21–1	Tony Arias	KO	1 (10)	Aug 12, 1978	Maestranza Cesar Giron, Maracay, Venezuela	
21	Win	20–1	Teodoro Osuna	KO	1 (10)	Jul 8, 1978	Roberto Clemente Coliseum, San Juan, Puerto Rico	
20	Win	19–1	Gerardo Aceves	KO	2 (10)	Apr 22, 1978	Roberto Clemente Coliseum, San Juan, Puerto Rico	
19	Win	18–1	Angel Rosas	TKO	3 (10)	Aug 27, 1977	Roberto Clemente Coliseum, San Juan, Puerto Rico	
18	Win	17–1	Salvador Torres	KO	1 (10)	Jul 3, 1977	Caracas, Venezuela	
17	Win	16–1	Milton Mendez	KO	1 (10)	May 15, 1977	Nuevo Circo, Caracas, Venezuela	
16	Win	15–1	Isaac Marin	TKO	5 (10)	Jan 30, 1977	Caracas, Venezuela	
15	Win	14–1	Ricardo Arredondo	PTS	10	Nov 14, 1976	Caracas, Venezuela	
14	Win	13–1	Andres Fernandez	KO	1 (10)	Oct 16, 1976	Caracas, Venezuela	
13	Win	12–1	Rolando Martinez	KO	1 (10)	Aug 29, 1976	Caracas, Venezuela	
12	Win	11–1	Clemente Mucino	KO	1 (10)	Aug 22, 1976	Caracas, Venezuela	
11	Win	10–1	Julio Pena	TKO	1 (10)	Jul 11, 1976	Caracas, Venezuela	
10	Win	9–1	Juan Sarmiento	TKO	3 (10)	Jun 13, 1976	Caracas, Venezuela	
9	Win	8–1	Luis Beltran Rodriguez	PTS	10	Mar 6, 1976	Caracas, Venezuela	
8	Win	7–1	Danton Morillo	KO	2 (6)	Feb 28, 1976	Caracas, Venezuela	
7	Win	6–1	Cesar Chavez	KO	2 (6)	Feb 18, 1976	Maturín, Venezuela	
6	Win	5–1	Ruben Arias	KO	1 (6)	Nov 17, 1975	Santo Domingo, Dominican Republic	
5	Win	4–1	Luis Romero	TKO	2 (6)	Oct 4, 1975	Caracas, Venezuela	
4	Loss	3–1	Luis Beltran Rodriguez	PTS	6	Aug 25, 1975	Caracas, Venezuela	
3	Win	3–0	Freddy Briceno	TKO	3 (6)	Aug 8, 1975	Caracas, Venezuela	
2	Win	2–0	Jose Figuerero	PTS	4	Jul 14, 1975	Caracas, Venezuela	
1	Win	1–0	Hernan Rodriguez	TKO	1 (4)	Mar 17, 1975	Caracas, Venezuela	

== Personal life ==
His brother Crisanto España won the WBA world welterweight title in the early 1990s, when he beat Meldrick Taylor and lost it in his third defense to Ike Quartey.

== See also ==
- Notable boxing families
- List of world lightweight boxing champions

Sporting positions
Regional boxing titles
Vacant Title last held by Rafael Williams	WBC FECARBOX lightweight champion June 1, 1985 – 1986; Vacated	Vacant Title next held by Francisco Álvarez
World boxing titles
Vacant Title last held by Roberto Durán	WBA lightweight champion June 16, 1979 – March 2, 1980	Succeeded by Hilmer Kenty
