= Bobby Chacon vs. Rafael Limón =

Boxing competition

The Chacon vs. Limón series was four boxing fights between the American Bobby Chacon (1951–2016) and the Mexican Rafael Limón (born 1954). It was a rivalry that made history in the sport. Many sports historians consider Chacon–Limón to be among boxing's fiercest rivalries, alongside Ali–Frazier, Ali–Norton, Barrera–Morales, Vázquez–R. Márquez, Gatti–Ward, Louis–Schmeling, Durán–De Jesus, Leonard–Durán, Leonard–Hearns and Pacquiao–J.M. Márquez to name a few.

Limón won on a ten-round decision in 1975. The 1979 match was declared a technical draw after an unintentional headbutt in round seven. Chacon won on a ten-round split decision in 1980. Chacon narrowly won again in 1982 after a knockdown of Limón with ten seconds left in the last of fifteen rounds.

== Prelude ==
In order to examine this series of fights, a look at the history of relationships between Mexicans who were living in Mexico and Mexican-Americans (Chicanos or Tejanos) should be undertaken, Chacon was a Chicano, being born and raised in California. Limón is from Mexico.

Southwest states like Arizona, New Mexico, Texas, Nevada and California were actually part of Northern Mexico before the United States took over those areas after the Mexican–American War. When the United States took over the states that border with Mexico, Hispanics predominated the area. As a consequence, many Mexican families abounded. After the United States took possession (Arizona and New Mexico became states in 1912), the children born afterwards to Mexicans who lived in these states became, legally speaking, Mexican-Americans or Americans with Mexican descent.

Later on, other facts to be taken into consideration also took place. The coming of the Hollywood era, for example, should be taken into consideration. Being that Hollywood is in California, and the movie making industry made Hollywood an affluent city, many Hispanics, both Mexicans and Hispanics from other countries, were lured into trying their luck in California. Early Hollywood films, however, were responsible for a racist term used towards Mexicans: the term "greaser", an insulting word to Hispanics, was first used in the 1911 movie "Tony the Greaser", followed by 1914's "The Greaser's Revenge" and 1918's "Guns and Greasers".

Hispanics who came into the United States during the early 20th century were usually farm workers, or had meek jobs when compared to other United States residents. Racism was considerable in the United States at that time; not only were Blacks relegated in the South, but many western area stores, restaurants and services segregated the Hispanic community as well. Some establishments had billboards that said "No Mexicans" or "No Service to Mexicans", for example, during the period (on the Eastern seaboard states at the same time, many establishments refused to serve Puerto Ricans, with signs that read "no service to Porto Ricans" among other things). This may have led to many immigrants, who were already facing trouble with their migratory status in the first place, to not encourage their children to learn proper Spanish. Immigration was (and has always been) another issue among Hispanics. Those who learned some English and had no legal status in the United States would use English to, among other reasons, avoid being deported.

Because Latin Americans are usually proud of their Hispanic background, many residents of Mexico and every other country in Latin America found it hard to understand why ethnic Hispanics in the United States spoke English mainly. This sometimes led to resentment between their own race. Mexican-Americans began to be known as "Chicanos" mainly, but also as "Tejanos".

Sports have always been a way for many Hispanics who settle in the United States to gain economic rewards. Baseball and boxing in particular have produced famous Hispanic athletes. In Latin America things were not too different, with baseball, boxing, soccer and, much later on, basketball, becoming sports in which Hispanics have exceeded.

In California, boxing was a favorite sport among Hispanics. Art Aragon was a very famous Chicano boxer, from whom Oscar De La Hoya would later inherit the nickname "The Golden Boy". Manuel Ortiz, a world Bantamweight champion of the 1940s, held the world record for most defenses in that division for more than fifty years. Meanwhile, in Mexico, boxers like "Kid Azteca", (one of Mexico's first national boxing idols), and, later on, Chucho Castillo and Rubén Olivares, flourished. The Olympic Auditorium in Los Angeles, under the auspices of Aileen Eaton, became a mecca of sorts for Mexican-American and Mexican fighters alike. Many of the earliest fights between Mexicans and Mexican-Americans, already split by the issues that concerned each side, took place there.

By the time that Bobby Chacon and Rafael Limón entered boxing during the 1970s, the boxing rivalry between Mexicans and Mexican-Americans/Chicanos was already a rabid one.

== First fight ==
Bobby Chacon vs. Rafael Limón
- Date: December 7, 1975
- Venue: Plaza de Toros Calafia, Mexicali, Baja California, Mexico

Tale of the tape
Boxer	Bobby Chacon	Rafael Limón
Nickname	"Schoolboy"	"Bazooka"
Hometown	Sylmar, California, U.S.	Tlaxco, Tlaxcala, Mexico
Pre-fight record	27–2 (25 KO)	20–7 (16 KO)
Age	24 years	21 years, 10 months
Height	5 ft 5 1/2 in (166 cm)	5 ft 5 1/2 in (166 cm)
Weight	129 3/4 lb (59 kg)	129 1/4 lb (59 kg)
Style	Orthodox	Southpaw
Recognition	WBC; No. 6 Ranked Featherweight; Former featherweight champion	

Result
- Limón defeats Chacon by unanimous decision

On December 7, 1975, the first Chacon–Limón encounter took place, at the Plaza de Toros Calafia in Mexicali, Baja California, Mexico.

=== Background ===
Bobby Chacon claimed the WBC world Featherweight title on September 7, 1974, in Los Angeles by knocking out Alfredo Marcano in ten rounds. He lost that title when he was knocked out by Olivares on June 20, 1975, also in Los Angeles. Limón was a rising star in the boxing world at the time; he had become a well known boxer in Mexico. Both Chacon and Limón had heavy chances at stake: both were searching for a title try at the Jr. Lightweight division at the time.

=== The fight ===
The fight was fought at a quick pace from the beginning, with Limón and Chacon throwing quick combinations from the onset. The two boxers did not slow down as rounds went by: fighting at close range, the two boxers hit each other with strong punches down the stretch, leaving most boxing fans with the desire to see them fight again. No knockdowns happened in their first fight, and Limón won on a ten-round decision.

=== Undercard ===
Confirmed bouts:

Preceded by vs. Fel Clemente	Bobby Chacon's bouts 7 December 1975	Succeeded by vs. Gene Prado
Preceded by vs. Juan Pablo Oropeza	Rafael Limón's bouts 7 December 1975	Succeeded by vs. Vicente Blanco

== Second fight ==
Rafael Limón vs. Bobby Chacon II
- Date: April 4, 1979
- Venue: Los Angeles Memorial Sports Arena, Los Angeles, California, U.S.
- Title(s) on the line: NABF super featherweight title

Tale of the tape
Boxer	Rafael Limón	Bobby Chacon
Nickname	"Bazooka"	"Schoolboy"
Hometown	Tlaxco, Tlaxcala, Mexico	Sylmar, California, U.S.
Pre-fight record	43–8–1 (32 KO)	41–4 (36 KO)
Age	25 years, 2 months	27 years, 4 months
Height	5 ft 5 1/2 in (166 cm)	5 ft 5 1/2 in (166 cm)
Weight	129 1/4 lb (59 kg)	129 3/4 lb (59 kg)
Style	Southpaw	Orthodox
Recognition	WBC; No. 1 Ranked Super Featherweight; NABF super featherweight champion	WBC; No. 4 Ranked Super Featherweight; Former featherweight champion

Result
- Technical Draw

Limón–Chacon II took place on April 4, 1979, at the Los Angeles Memorial Sports Arena.

=== Background ===
Both boxers were already ranked in the Jr. Lightweight division. At stake were the NABF Super Featherweight (Jr. Lightweight) title, and, perhaps more importantly, an opportunity to fight Alexis Argüello for the WBC's world Jr. Lightweight championship (both fighters would challenge Argüello for this title, Chacon was defeated by the Nicaraguan with a seventh-round technical knockout, and Limón by an eleventh-round technical knockout). Chacon–Limón II was scheduled for twelve rounds, because a regional title was at stake.

=== The fight ===
Their second fight has been described by some "the best rematch in boxing history". Fighting before a mixed crowd of Chacon and Limón fans, the two boxers once again held a brawl. It was a close fight throughout the seven rounds it lasted, with both fighters exchanging blows at close range. An unintentional headbutt by Chacon to Limon however, caused for the fight to be stopped in round seven. Because the fight was stopped as a consequence of a headbutt and not an actual punch, the three judges' scorecards were brought to declare a winner. Chacon was leading on cards, however, California rules at the time stated that if one fighter leads on card at the time of the stoppage but he or she commits an unintentional head butt, the contest's result was a draw, thus the fight was declared a seven-round technical draw.

=== Undercard ===
Confirmed bouts:

Preceded by vs. Miguel Estrada	Rafael Limón's bouts 4 April 1979	Succeeded by vs. Alexis Arguello
Preceded by vs. Shig Fukuyama	Bobby Chacon's bouts 4 April 1979	Succeeded by vs. Jose Torres

== Third fight ==
Rafael Limón vs. Bobby Chacon III
- Date: March 21, 1980
- Venue: The Forum, Inglewood, California, U.S.

Tale of the tape
Boxer	Rafael Limón	Bobby Chacon
Nickname	"Bazooka"	"Schoolboy"
Hometown	Tlaxco, Tlaxcala, Mexico	Sylmar, California, U.S.
Pre-fight record	44–9–2 (32 KO)	42–5–1 (36 KO)
Age	26 years, 2 months	28 years, 3 months
Height	5 ft 5 1/2 in (166 cm)	5 ft 5 1/2 in (166 cm)
Weight	130 1/2 lb (59 kg)	131 3/4 lb (60 kg)
Style	Southpaw	Orthodox
Recognition	WBC; No. 1 Ranked Super Featherweight	WBC; No. 6 Ranked Super Featherweight; Former featherweight champion

Result
- Chacon defeats Limón by split decision

=== Background ===
By the time Limón–Chacon III took place, both fighters had already lost to Argüello. Because of this, the two rivals saw their third fight as a fight they had to win in order to survive among Jr. Lightweight title contenders. While Chacon had already been a world champion, he was known to enjoy "the sweet life", having bought a mansion and some Bentley cars when he was world Featherweight champion; he felt he needed to win another world title in order to provide him and his family for an even better way of life.

Limón, on the other side, had never been a world champion. Having lost to Argüello recently, he thought he needed to beat Chacon again in order to stay as a ranked challenger.

Chacon–Limón III came on March 21, 1980, at The Forum in Los Angeles. The two rivals once again fought at a brisk pace, connecting with hard punches and refusing to change the fighting styles both displayed through their careers.

=== The fight ===
Chacon–Limón III was another close fight, which went into the latter rounds without any of the two combatants holding a significant lead. Ultimately, Chacon's punches proved more telling than Limón's. Chacon won the fight by a ten-round split decision, avenging his earlier loss to Limón. Marty Denkin had the fight 96–94 for Limón while John Thomas and Frank Rustich both had it 96-95 for Chacon. The Associated Press had it 97-94 for Limón.

=== Undercard ===
Confirmed bouts:

Preceded by vs. Faustino Pena	Rafael Limón's bouts 21 March 1980	Succeeded by vs. Frank Ahumada
Preceded by vs. Alexis Argüello	Bobby Chacon's bouts 21 March 1980	Succeeded by vs. Roberto Garcia

== Fourth fight ==
Rafael Limón vs. Bobby Chacon IV
- Date: December 11, 1982
- Venue: Memorial Auditorium, Sacramento, California, U.S.
- Title(s) on the line: WBC super featherweight title

Tale of the tape
Boxer	Rafael Limón	Bobby Chacon
Nickname	"Bazooka"	"Schoolboy"
Hometown	Tlaxco, Tlaxcala, Mexico	Sylmar, California, U.S.
Pre-fight record	50–11–2 (37 KO)	50–6–1 (42 KO)
Age	28 years, 10 months	31 years
Height	5 ft 5 1/2 in (166 cm)	5 ft 5 1/2 in (166 cm)
Weight	129 3/4 lb (59 kg)	130 lb (59 kg)
Style	Southpaw	Orthodox
Recognition	WBC; Super Featherweight Champion; The Ring; No. 3 Ranked Super Featherweight	WBC; No. 5 Ranked Super Featherweight; The Ring; No. 6 Ranked Super Featherweight; Former featherweight champion

Result
- Chacon defeats Limón by unanimous decision

=== Background ===
The last fight in the Chacon–Limón rivalry was perhaps the most compelling one. Limón had already become WBC world Jr. Lightweight champion twice. He defeated Idelfonso Bethelmy of Venezuela by knockout in fifteen on December 11, 1980, to claim the title vacated by Argüello. After losing the title to Cornelius Boza-Edwards by a fifteen-round decision on March 8, 1981, he recovered the title by knocking out Edwards' conqueror, Rolando Navarrete, in twelve rounds on May 29, 1982.

Chacon, meanwhile, had insisted on boxing, dreaming that he would someday become world champion again. His decision to go on with boxing had reportedly caused his first wife, Valorie Chacon, to commit suicide months before Limón–Chacon IV. Valorie Chacon's suicide provided Bobby Chacon with a perhaps unlikely source of inspiration; he dedicated the fight to his late wife.

Limón–Chacon IV was the only bout between the two fighters where a world title was involved. The fight was held on December 11, 1982, at the Memorial Auditorium in Sacramento, California. The Ring heralded this fight as their "fight of the year". Keith Jackson was commentating at ringside and the fight was televised live on ABC's Wide World of Sports.

=== The fight ===
Limón began the fight quick, combining bolo punches and uppercuts to the body to dominate the first few rounds. With 20 seconds remaining in the third round Limón scored a knockdown via a stiff straight left counter which caught Chacon, who was knocked off balance and touched both gloves to the canvas. Chacon received an eight count but got up quickly and seemed to be not badly hurt. After this round, however, Chacon began a comeback. Trading punches toe to toe with the champion, Chacon also started to dig to his foe's body and the pace began to tell on Limón.

Limón, however, kept fighting at a furious pace, and, in round ten, he sent Chacon to the floor for a second time. Chacon, however, got up again.

Chacon then proceeded to mount a rally during the last five rounds. His body punches had made an effect on Limón, who began to backpedal for the rest of the fight. While Limón kept throwing from every angle he could, Chacon spent the latter rounds on top of him, outmaneuvering Limón as the two fighters engaged in furious trading. By the end of round fourteen, the fight was seemingly headed to be another draw (tie).

The key moment in the fight came with ten seconds to go in the last round, when Chacon struck suddenly, connecting with a right to Limón's chin and sending Limón to the floor. While Limón got up, a mandatory standing count was carried by the referee, and by the time the fight was allowed to go on, there was only two seconds left in the bout. As it turns out, the knockdown made Chacon a world champion for the second time, just as he had promised his wife and family he would be, when judges Angel L. Guzman and Tamotsu Tomihara gave him the fight by a single point, 142-141 and 141-140 respectively (in boxing, a knockdown usually gives a fighter both the round and an extra point in a judge's scorecard, without the knockdown, Chacon would not have won). The third judge, Carlos Padilla, Jr., scored the bout 143–141, also for Chacon.

Limón–Chacon IV was promoted by famed promoter Don King, who had also promoted the Michael Dokes vs. Mike Weaver fight the previous night at Las Vegas, Nevada, and whose company's (Don King Productions) logo was featured prominently on the ring's canvas on Chacon–Limon IV.

=== Undercard ===
Confirmed bouts:

Preceded by vs. Chung Il Choi	Rafael Limón's bouts 11 December 1982	Succeeded by vs. Héctor Camacho
Preceded by vs. Arturo Leon	Bobby Chacon's bouts 11 December 1982	Succeeded by vs. Cornelius Boza Edwards II
Awards
Preceded by Sugar Ray Leonard vs. Thomas Hearns	The Ring Fight of the Year; 1982	Succeeded by Bobby Chacon vs. Cornelius Boza-Edwards II

== Aftermath ==
Chacon left the title vacant less than a year later; due to contractual disagreements, he refused to fight top challenger Héctor Camacho, opting to challenge Ray Mancini instead for the WBA world Lightweight title. Limón then got a chance to become a three time world Jr. Lightweight champion by fighting Camacho for the vacant WBC world title. Limón lost to Camacho by a knockout in five rounds.

Chacon himself lost to Mancini by a knockout in round three. It can be said that the last chapter of the Chacon–Limón rivalry took out what was left between the two fighters.

Chacon later faced alcohol problems and several other situations, such as the murder of his son, Bobby Jr. He subsequently lost all the money he earned in the ring, and the properties he bought. He suffered from dementia pugilistica, and lived with family members. In 2005 Chacon was inducted into the International Boxing Hall of Fame in Canastota, New York. Chacon died on September 7, 2016, from a fall suffered at his home.

Despite many attempts at becoming a title challenger again, Limón could not achieve this goal. He lost most of his fights after the fourth installment of his series with Chacon, including the bout against Camacho and other fights against Julio César Chávez, Rolando Navarrete in a rematch of their 1982 bout won by Limon, and Roger Mayweather. Limón currently lives in Mexico.
