= Bobby Chacon =

American boxer

Personal information
- Nickname: Schoolboy
- Born: November 28, 1951 Sylmar, California, U.S.
- Died: September 7, 2016 (aged 64) Lake Elsinore, California, U.S.
- Height: 5 ft 5 1/2 in (166 cm)
- Weight: Featherweight; Super featherweight; Lightweight

Boxing career
- Reach: 64 in (163 cm)
- Stance: Orthodox

Boxing record
- Total fights: 67
- Wins: 59
- Win by KO: 47
- Losses: 7
- Draws: 1

Bobby Chacon (November 28, 1951 – September 7, 2016) was an American professional boxer who competed from 1972 to 1988. He held titles in two weight classes, including the World Boxing Council (WBC) featherweight world title from 1974 to 1975 and the WBC super featherweight world title from 1982 to 1983.

== Biography ==
=== Early career ===
Born in Pacoima, in the San Fernando Valley, Chacon, who was of Mexican descent, graduated from San Fernando High School and turned professional in 1972 while a student at California State University, Northridge, leading to the nickname "Schoolboy". He trained under Joe Ponce and won his first 19 fights, including a win against former champion Jesus Castillo. Fourteen months into his professional career, Chacon faced world champion Rubén Olivares but lost the bout when Olivares scored a ninth-round knock out. After suffering his first defeat against Olivares, Chacon won his next four bouts, then faced off against cross-town rival and future champion Danny Lopez. Chacon outboxed Lopez and stopped him in the ninth round in an exciting fight.

=== WBC Featherweight title ===
On September 7, 1974, Chacon won the vacant WBC featherweight world title by defeating former WBA junior lightweight world champion Alfredo Marcano in nine rounds at the Grand Olympic Auditorium in Los Angeles. During his first period as a world champion, Chacon got to enjoy the good life, but he loved partying and became an alcoholic.

Chacon lost his title in his second defense against arch-rival Rubén Olivares. Almost immediately after the loss, he fought the first of his four fight rivalry with another world champion, Rafael "Bazooka" Limón, beginning what some boxing experts and historians called one of the fiercest and most spectacular boxing rivalries in history. Limón beat Chacon in their first bout by a decision. Chacon then scored nine straight wins, leading him to a third match with Olivares. This time, Chacon defeated Olivares in their 10-round bout by a decision. In Chacon's next fight, he lost an upset decision to Arturo Leon. Chacon rebounded by scoring victories over Ignacio Campos, Augie Pantellas, Gerald Hayes and Shig Fukuyama. He then fought to a technical draw in a rematch against Rafael Limón.

In November 1979, Chacon received a shot at the WBC title, versus world champion Alexis Argüello. Arguello defeated him by a devastating knock out after Chacon sustained a bad cut in the seventh round. In 1980, Chacon had only one fight, but it was a significant one. He beat Limón in their third bout, and the WBC once again made him their number one challenger. In 1981, Arguello had left the title vacant and gone up in weight to pursue the world's lightweight title. Limón then beat Idelfonso Bethelmy by a knockout in 15 in Los Angeles to win the WBC world Jr. Lightweight championship. In his first title defense, he lost it by a decision to Uganda's Cornelius Boza-Edwards, who, in turn, defended his title against Chacon on his first defense. In a televised bout, Edwards retained the world title by a knockout in the thirteenth round.

Chacon won five fights in a row in 1982, including a rematch victory over Arturo Leon, which kept him as the number one challenger, but then a dramatic development outside the ring changed his life forever: Chacon's wife, Valorie Chacon, flew to Hawaii on February of that year, hoping to convince him to leave boxing and move there if she found them good jobs. She was able to find a job, but unable to convince him to join her in Hawaii, so she flew back. She pleaded for him to leave the sport but was unsuccessful, and the night before he boxed Salvador Ugalde, she shot and killed herself with a rifle. Chacon went through with the fight and KO'ed Ugalde in the third round. He dedicated his win to his deceased wife.

=== WBC Super featherweight title ===
Two more victories followed before his fourth and final bout with Limón. Limón had regained the world's Jr. lightweight title by beating Rolando Navarrete by a knockout in 12 rounds. Navarrete, for his part, had won the title by beating Edwards by a knockout in five rounds. Chacon-Limón IV became one of the fights of the year and the decade, according to such magazines as The Ring, KO Magazine, and Ring En Español, and after 15 rounds Chacon secured a close decision and his second world title in Sacramento.

About one and a half years after his wife's suicide, Chacon remarried and bought a large farm with a mansion and, according to what he said at an interview, about 40 horses. He also acquired a collection of Rolls-Royce cars and some other vehicles. In between, he and Boza Edwards met for a second time, with his world title on the line, in what The Ring called 1983's fight of the year. Chacon rose from a knockdown in round three and recovered from a dangerous cut. The announcers, including Ferdie Pacheco, were explicit in saying the fight should be stopped because of the pounding Chacon endured. But Chacon came back to drop Boza Edwards in round twelve and avenge his earlier defeat to the Ugandan former champion. In 1983, Chacon was signed to defend his WBC title in that rematch against Boza Edwards, who was the WBC's mandatory challenger. Even though WBC rules stated the mandatory challenger should receive a shot at the title, the WBC insisted Chacon fight Héctor Camacho in Puerto Rico instead, then stripped him of his title when he refused.

Chacon started 1984 with a move up in weight, to the lightweight division, where he tried to join the exclusive club of boxing's three division world champions, but was knocked out in three during his challenge against world champion Ray Mancini in Reno. Chacon then beat Carlton Sparrow by a TKO in five rounds and announced his retirement. Chacon came back in 1985 and he won five fights, including one against former world champion Arturo Frias by a knockout in seven, and a knockout in five over Rafael Solis, who had challenged Camacho for the world Jr. lightweight title that had once belonged to Chacon. In 1987 and 1989 he won one fight each year. He retired in 1989 winning 14 out of his last 15 fights.

== Professional boxing record ==
67 fights	59 wins	7 losses
By knockout	47	5
By decision	12	2
Draws	1	

No.	Result	Record	Opponent	Type	Round, time	Date	Location	Notes
67	Win	59–7–1	Bobby Jones	UD	10	Jun 2, 1988	Fairgrounds Exhibition Hall, Orlando, Florida, U.S.	
66	Win	58–7–1	Martin Guevera	TKO	3 (10), 2:01	Jun 23, 1987	Holiday Inn Holidome, Tucson, Arizona, U.S.	
65	Win	57–7–1	Rafael Solis	TKO	5 (10)	Oct 4, 1985	ARCO Arena, Sacramento, California, U.S.	
64	Win	56–7–1	Arturo Frias	TKO	7 (10), 2:03	Aug 15, 1985	Lawlor Events Center, Reno, Nevada, U.S.	
63	Win	55–7–1	Davey Montana	KO	8 (10), 2:19	May 20, 1985	Lawlor Events Center, Reno, Nevada, U.S.	
62	Win	54–7–1	Freddie Roach	MD	10	Mar 5, 1985	Memorial Auditorium, Sacramento, California, U.S.	
61	Win	53–7–1	Carlton Sparrow	TKO	5 (10), 2:19	Jun 12, 1984	Memorial Auditorium, Sacramento, California, U.S.	
60	Loss	52–7–1	Ray Mancini	TKO	3 (15), 1:17	Jan 14, 1984	Lawlor Events Center, Reno, Nevada, U.S.	For WBA lightweight title
59	Win	52–6–1	Cornelius Boza Edwards	UD	12	May 15, 1983	Caesars Palace, Paradise, Nevada, U.S.	
58	Win	51–6–1	Rafael Limón	UD	15	Dec 11, 1982	Memorial Auditorium, Sacramento, California, U.S.	Won WBC super-featherweight title
57	Win	50–6–1	Arturo Leon	UD	10	Jun 15, 1982	Memorial Auditorium, Sacramento, California, U.S.	
56	Win	49–6–1	Rosendo Ramirez	TKO	8 (10)	May 4, 1982	Memorial Auditorium, Sacramento, California, U.S.	
55	Win	48–6–1	Salvador Ugalde	TKO	3 (10), 1:52	Mar 16, 1982	Memorial Auditorium, Sacramento, California, U.S.	
54	Win	47–6–1	Renan Marota	TKO	8 (10)	Feb 23, 1982	Memorial Auditorium, Sacramento, California, U.S.	
53	Win	46–6–1	Augustin Rivera	RTD	6 (10), 3:00	Nov 7, 1981	Sports Arena, Los Angeles, California, U.S.	
52	Loss	45–6–1	Cornelius Boza Edwards	RTD	13 (15)	May 30, 1981	Showboat Hotel and Casino, Las Vegas, Nevada, U.S.	For WBC super-featherweight title
51	Win	45–5–1	Leon Smith	TKO	3 (10)	Mar 12, 1981	Olympic Auditorium, Los Angeles, California, U.S.	
50	Win	44–5–1	Roberto Garcia	TKO	10 (10), 2:55	Feb 5, 1981	Olympic Auditorium, Los Angeles, California, U.S.	
49	Win	43–5–1	Rafael Limón	SD	10	Mar 21, 1980	The Forum, Inglewood, California, U.S.	
48	Loss	42–5–1	Alexis Argüello	RTD	7 (15), 3:00	Nov 16, 1979	The Forum, Inglewood, California, U.S.	For WBC super-featherweight title
47	Win	42–4–1	Jose Torres	UD	10	Jun 18, 1979	Sports Arena, Los Angeles, California, U.S.	
46	Draw	41–4–1	Rafael Limón	TD	7 (12), 1:22	Apr 9, 1979	Sports Arena, Los Angeles, California, U.S.	For NABF super-featherweight title
45	Win	41–4	Shig Fukuyama	TKO	5 (10), 1:22	Feb 26, 1979	Sports Arena, Los Angeles, California, U.S.	
44	Win	40–4	Gerald Hayes	UD	10	Dec 6, 1978	Civic Auditorium, Stockton, California, U.S.	
43	Win	39–4	Augie Pantellas	TKO	7 (10), 1:32	Sep 27, 1978	Spectrum, Philadelphia, Pennsylvania, U.S.	
42	Win	38–4	Ignacio Campos	TKO	7 (10), 0:47	May 19, 1978	Coliseum, San Diego, California, U.S.	
41	Loss	37–4	Arturo Leon	SD	10	Nov 15, 1977	Convention Center, Anaheim, California, U.S.	
40	Win	37–3	Rubén Olivares	UD	10	Aug 20, 1977	The Forum, Inglewood, California, U.S.	
39	Win	36–3	Alejandro Lopez	RTD	7 (10)	Jul 15, 1977	Coliseum, San Diego, California, U.S.	
38	Win	35–3	Miguel Estrada	TKO	2 (10), 1:42	Jun 9, 1977	Olympic Auditorium, Los Angeles, California, U.S.	
37	Win	34–3	Ramon Contreras	TKO	8 (10), 1:16	May 19, 1977	Olympic Auditorium, Los Angeles, California, U.S.	
36	Win	33–3	Julio Leal	TKO	7 (10), 1:54	Jan 13, 1977	Olympic Auditorium, Los Angeles, California, U.S.	
35	Win	32–3	Miguel Meza	TKO	3 (10), 0:44	Dec 16, 1976	Olympic Auditorium, Los Angeles, California, U.S.	
34	Win	31–3	Bonnie Necessario	TKO	2 (10)	Nov 10, 1976	Civic Auditorium, Stockton, California, U.S.	
33	Win	30–3	David Sotelo	UD	10	Feb 25, 1976	The Forum, Inglewood, California, U.S.	
32	Win	29–3	Modesto Concepcion	TKO	10 (10), 2:59	Feb 17, 1976	Civic Auditorium, San Jose, California, U.S.	
31	Win	28–3	Gene Prado	KO	5 (10), 1:09	Jan 27, 1976	Wilson Theater, Fresno, California, U.S.	
30	Loss	27–3	Rafael Limón	UD	10	Dec 7, 1975	Plaza de Toros Calafia, Mexicali, Baja California, Mexico	
29	Win	27–2	Fel Clemente	TKO	5 (10), 2:44	Nov 18, 1975	Honolulu International Center, Honolulu, Hawaii, U.S.	
28	Loss	26–2	Rubén Olivares	TKO	2 (15), 2:29	Jun 20, 1975	The Forum, Inglewood, California, U.S.	Lost WBC featherweight title
27	Win	26–1	Jesus Estrada	KO	2 (15), 2:38	Mar 1, 1975	Olympic Auditorium, Los Angeles, California, U.S.	Retained WBC featherweight title
26	Win	25–1	Alfredo Marcano	TKO	9 (15), 2:18	Sep 7, 1974	Olympic Auditorium, Los Angeles, California, U.S.	Won vacant WBC featherweight title
25	Win	24–1	Danny Lopez	TKO	9 (12), 0:48	May 24, 1974	Sports Arena, Los Angeles, California, U.S.	
24	Win	23–1	Genzo Kurosawa	TKO	5 (10), 2:03	Mar 4, 1974	The Forum, Inglewood, California, U.S.	
23	Win	22–1	Jorge Ramos	TKO	5 (10), 2:19	Feb 1, 1974	Coliseum, San Diego, California, U.S.	
22	Win	21–1	Jose Luis Martin del Campo	TKO	9 (10), 0:46	Oct 13, 1973	The Forum, Inglewood, California, U.S.	
21	Win	20–1	Jorge Ramos	TKO	10 (10), 2:37	Sep 28, 1973	Coliseum, San Diego, California, U.S.	
20	Loss	19–1	Rubén Olivares	RTD	9 (12)	Jun 23, 1973	The Forum, Inglewood, California, U.S.	For NABF featherweight title
19	Win	19–0	Chucho Castillo	TKO	10 (10), 1:35	Apr 28, 1973	The Forum, Inglewood, California, U.S.	
18	Win	18–0	Frankie Crawford	UD	10	Mar 30, 1973	Convention Center, Anaheim, California, U.S.	
17	Win	17–0	Jose Luis Martin del Campo	TKO	3 (10), 0:43	Feb 28, 1973	The Forum, Inglewood, California, U.S.	
16	Win	16–0	Arturo Pineda	KO	5 (10), 1:00	Feb 15, 1973	Olympic Auditorium, Los Angeles, California, U.S.	
15	Win	15–0	Ray Echevarria	TKO	1 (10), 2:06	Nov 6, 1972	Valley Music Theater, Woodland Hills, California, U.S.	
14	Win	14–0	Alberto Reyes	TKO	9 (10), 0:18	Oct 16, 1972	Valley Music Theater, Woodland Hills, California, U.S.	
13	Win	13–0	Valente Vera	TKO	5 (10), 1:40	Sep 11, 1972	Convention Center, Anaheim, California, U.S.	
12	Win	12–0	Juan Montayo	TKO	8 (8), 0:33	Aug 21, 1972	The Forum, Inglewood, California, U.S.	
11	Win	11–0	Modesto Boy Dayaganon	TKO	2 (?)	Aug 11, 1972	Wailuku Stadium, Maui County, Hawaii, U.S.	
10	Win	10–0	Alfredo De La Rosa	KO	4 (5)	Jul 31, 1972	Convention Center, Anaheim, California, U.S.	
9	Win	9–0	Alberto Perez	KO	5 (6), 2:21	Jul 17, 1972	The Forum, Inglewood, California, U.S.	
8	Win	8–0	Jesus Robles	KO	2 (6), 2:16	Jun 30, 1972	The Forum, Inglewood, California, U.S.	
7	Win	7–0	Alfredo De La Rosa	UD	5	Jun 19, 1972	The Forum, Inglewood, California, U.S.	
6	Win	6–0	Ray Llamas	KO	1 (6), 1:41	Jun 5, 1972	The Forum, Inglewood, California, U.S.	
5	Win	5–0	Luis Robles	KO	1 (6), 2:27	May 22, 1972	The Forum, Inglewood, California, U.S.	
4	Win	4–0	Henry Felix	KO	1 (5), 2:59	May 15, 1972	The Forum, Inglewood, California, U.S.	
3	Win	3–0	Ruben Coria	KO	2 (5)	May 8, 1972	The Forum, Inglewood, California, U.S.	
2	Win	2–0	Limon Salas	KO	1 (6), 1:42	Apr 22, 1972	The Forum, Inglewood, California, U.S.	
1	Win	1–0	Jose Antonio Rosa	KO	5 (6), 2:30	Apr 7, 1972	The Forum, Inglewood, California, U.S.	

== Titles in boxing ==
=== Major world titles ===
- WBC featherweight champion (126 lbs)
- WBC super featherweight champion (130 lbs)

== Later life and death ==
Chacon was placed on probation in 1984 for beating his second of three wives. His life was again marred by tragedy in 1991, when his son Bobby Jr. was killed in a gang slaying. In 1996, he was spotted at a public appearance in Phoenix, Arizona, to see the fight between Oscar De La Hoya and Julio César Chávez. By 2000 he had lost most of his savings and was being cared for by a nurse as he was impacted by dementia pugilistica (boxer's syndrome). He died after falling while in hospice care for dementia on September 7, 2016. He was 64.

== Honors and references ==
In 1982, he was named comeback fighter of the year by The Ring. His wins over Limon in 1982 and Edwards in 1983, were both named Ring Magazine fights of the year. In 2003, Chacon was included on The Ring's list of "The 100 Greatest Punchers of All-Time". Chacon was inducted into the International Boxing Hall of Fame in January 2005; he was to be inducted into the West Boxing Hall of Fame later in September 2016.

The chorus of Warren Zevon's song "Boom Boom Mancini", from his 1987 album Sentimental Hygiene, makes reference to Chacon's fight with Mancini three years earlier. Chacon died thirteen years to the day after Zevon.

== See also ==
- List of Mexican boxing world champions
- List of world featherweight boxing champions
- List of world super-featherweight boxing champions

Sporting positions
World boxing titles
Vacant Title last held by Éder Jofre	WBC featherweight champion September 7, 1974 – June 20, 1975	Succeeded by Rubén Olivares
Preceded by Rafael Limón	WBC super-featherweight champion December 11, 1982 – June 27, 1983; Stripped	Vacant Title next held by Héctor Camacho
Awards
Previous: Sugar Ray Leonard TKO 14; Thomas Hearns I	The Ring Fight of the Year; W 15 Rafael Limón IV; 1982	Next: Himself W 12; Cornelius Boza-Edwards II
Previous: Himself W 15; Rafael Limón IV	The Ring Fight of the Year; W 12 Cornelius Boza-Edwards II; 1983	Next: José Luis Ramírez KO 4 Edwin Rosario
