= Arturo Leon =

American boxer (b. 1949)

Arturo Leon (born in 1949) is a Mexican-American former boxer from Arizona, United States. He was a junior lightweight who once challenged Alexis Arguello for the Nicaraguan's World Boxing Council's world Junior Lightweight title, losing by 15 round unanimous decision.

== Notable fights ==
- On October 17, 1973, Leon made his professional debut against the far more experienced, 56 fight veteran Dave White, who had a record of 18 wins, 34 losses and 4 draws (ties), at Las Vegas, Nevada. Leon won by knockout in round eight. This bout also marked the first of 17 professional bouts for Leon in Las Vegas.
- For his next bout, Leon boxed 6-2-1 Moses Carbin, on November 20, 1973, in Las Vegas. Leon lost as a professional for the first time, by an eight-round decision.
- With a 3–1, 2 knockout wins record, Leon stepped in a boxing ring with super-expert Angel Robinson Garcia, who was 129-66-19 in a by then 214 bouts career. This fight was held at the Sahara Tahoe hotel in Stateline, Nevada on April 18, 1974. Despite boxing well, Leon lost a six-round split decision.
- On October 8, 1974, the 7–3, 3 knockout wins Leon boxed 30 wins, 5 losses and 3 ties prospect Lorenzo Trujillo, losing a ten-round unanimous decision in the main event of a boxing program held at the Memorial Coliseum at Corpus Christi, Texas,
- Leon then contested against Dale Hernandez, an undefeated, 21-0 prospect, for the USA Nevada State regional Lightweight title, losing a 12-round unanimous decision on November 27, 1974, in Las Vegas.
- On January 18, 1975, Leon faced Jimmy Heair, 37-3 coming in, as part of a card where Danny Lopez suffered a ten-round upset decision loss to Octavio Gomez. Leon caused a mild upset by narrowly outpointing Heair, winning a ten-round majority decision.
- On his next fight after beating Heair, Leon fought future José Cuevas and Thomas Hearns world Welterweight title challenger Randy Shields, 18–0, at the Olympic Auditorium in Los Angeles, California, on March 1, 1975, in a show headlined by WBC world Featherweight champion Bobby Chacon's retaining his title by second-round knockout over Jesus Estrada. Shields beat Leon by a ten-round unanimous decision.
- Leon faced 18-0 contender Rudy Hernandez, losing a unanimous ten-round decision on June 19, 1975, at San Diego, California.
- On October 28, 1975, Leon boxed future Aaron Pryor and Ray Mancini rival, the 19 wins, 1 loss Norman Goins, at the Honolulu International Center in Honolulu, Hawaii, marking Leon's debut outside the continental United States as a professional boxer. Goins beat Leon by ten round unanimous decision.
- Ray Lunny III was a world ranked challenger when Leon tried to derail his way to a world championship fight against Alfredo Escalera. Leon and Lunny III, who had a record of 23 wins, 2 losses and 3 ties, met on February 9, 1976, at the Civic Auditorium in San Francisco. Leon fought a hard fight but was deemed loser by unanimous decision, two judges voting the fight 4-3-3 in rounds in favor of Lunny III and the other one by a 5-2-3 margin. Lunny III later challenged Escalera for Escalera's WBC world Junior Lightweight title, losing by twelfth-round knockout before retiring from boxing.
- Next was a rematch with Heair, by now 45–7, in the main event of an undercard that also included a bout by Alberto Sandoval. On March 4, 1976, at the Olympic Auditorium, Leon and Heair fought to a ten-round draw (tie).
- On September 21, 1976, Leon faced 29-1 Maurice Watkins, losing by a ten-round unanimous decision at Corpus Christi, Texas.
- A third match with Heair followed the Watkins bout. On Friday, January 21, 1977, Leon beat Heair by ten round split decision at the Coliseum, El Paso, Texas, headlining a boxing card that included the first ever women's boxing fight sanctioned in West Texas (Mary Ann Bermudez beat Sandy Parker by second-round knockout)
- With a record of 20 wins, 14 defeats and 2 draws (ties), 4 knockout wins, Leon faced ranked Junior Lightweight, 37-3 former World Boxing Council world Featherweight champion Bobby Chacon on November 15, 1977, at the Convention Center in Anaheim, California, as part of an undercard headed by future WBA Heavyweight champion of the world, Mike Weaver's victory over Pedro Lovell. Chacon was in line for a world championship fight with WBC world Junior Lightweight champion Alexis Arguello, but Leon caused an upset and obtained the biggest win of his career by recovering from two seventh round knockdowns to defeat Chacon by ten round split decision, inheriting the title shot against Arguello from Chacon.
- Three more wins followed Leon's upset victory over Chacon, and then, Leon met Nicaragua's Alexis Arguello for Arguello's WBC world Junior Lightweight title. The fight, fought over 15 rounds, took place Friday, November 10, 1978, at the Caesar's Palace hotel, in Las Vegas, Nevada, as part of the undercard that featured a main event consisting of WBC world Heavyweight champion Larry Holmes' defense of his title with a seventh-round knockout over Uruguayan-Spaniard Alfredo Evangelista. Leon, who came into the bout sporting a 23 wins, 14 losses and 2 draws record, managed to win some rounds by having judges Hal Miller, Duane Ford and Harold Buck give him four, four and five of the fifteen rounds, respectively, but he still lost by scores of 146-139 (Miller and Ford) and 145-140 (Buck). Leon was floored in round six.
- After two more wins over lower ranked opposition, Leon met Ernesto Herrera, 22–6–2. Herrera was a former world title challenger who had fought Eusebio Pedroza for Pedroza's WBA world Featherweight title and lost by knockout in round twelve; he had also fought Rafael Solis and Frankie Baltazar. On April 24, 1979, at Houston, Texas, Leon beat Herrera by a tenth round disqualification.
- On June 28, 1979, Leon faced future WBA world Lightweight Champion, the then undefeated, 11-0 Hilmer Kenty as part of an undercard featuring Thomas Hearns's third-round knockout over Bruce Curry. Leon was outpointed by Kenty at the Olympia Stadium in Detroit, Michigan.
- Leon returned to Corpus Christi, Texas, to fight 8-1 Roberto Elizondo on August 7, 1979. Leon lost on points in ten rounds. Elizondo would later challenge both Arguello and Puerto Rico's Edwin Rosario in unsuccessful bids for the WBC world Lightweight title.
- On October 23, 1979, Leon took on Sean O'Grady for the future WBA world Lightweight champion's NABF's lightweight title, losing a 15-round decision to O'Grady at Oklahoma City, Oklahoma.
- Next, Leon boxed 22–6–1, 11 knockouts Puerto Rican boxer Jorge Morales, a future NABF national Lightweight champion. On March 27, 1980, Leon outpointed Morales after 12 rounds at Atlantic City, New Jersey.
- Then, Leon faced future WBC world Junior Lightweight champion Rolando Navarrete on April 18, 1981, at Honolulu, Hawaii. Navarrete, 38-8-3 coming in, outpointed the Mexican-American over ten rounds.
- On November 10, 1981, Leon met noted contender, 15-0 John Montes in Las Vegas, losing on points after ten rounds.
- Arturo Leon faced the by then 32–3, former WBC world Junior Lightweight champion Cornelius Boza-Edwards on February 9, 1982, at Kensington, England. He lost by technical knockout in round four after injuring a shoulder, which made him unable to continue fighting that night.
- On April 22, 1982, Leon rivaled undefeated, 22-0 future world title challenger Irleis Cubanito Perez, a Cuban-American fighting out of Phoenix, Arizona. The bout was held at L.A.'s Olympic Auditorium, and Leon lost by ten round unanimous decision.
- Leon and Bobby Chacon had a rematch on June 15, 1982, at the Memorial Auditirium in Sacramento. at stake was a chance at the WBC world Junior Lightweight title, by this time held by Rafael Limon. Leon dropped Chacon in the second round but Chacon got up and outpointed Leon, beating him by ten round unanimous decision,
- Leon's next bout was against future two time world champion, 10–0, 6 knockouts contender Roger Mayweather at the Dunes Hotel in Las Vegas, on August 18, 1982. Mayweather defeated Leon by a ten rounds unanimous decision.
- Future world Junior Welterweight champion Joe Manley, 7-0 coming in, boxed Leon on September 14, 1982, at the Tropicana Hotel and Casino in Atlantic City, New Jersey. Leon lost that fight by ten rounds unanimous decision.
- Leon's last fight was against 17-1-1 prospect Steve Romero, who stopped him in nine rounds on August 26, 1983, in San Jose, California's Municipal Stadium.

== Record ==
Leon had 61 fights in professional boxing, of which he won 29, lost 30 and drew (tied) 2, with 7 wins and 2 defeats by knockout.

== Personal ==
Leon lived in Phoenix, Arizona for some time. He currently lives in Tucson.
