= Sacramento Memorial Auditorium =

Auditorium in Sacramento, California, United States

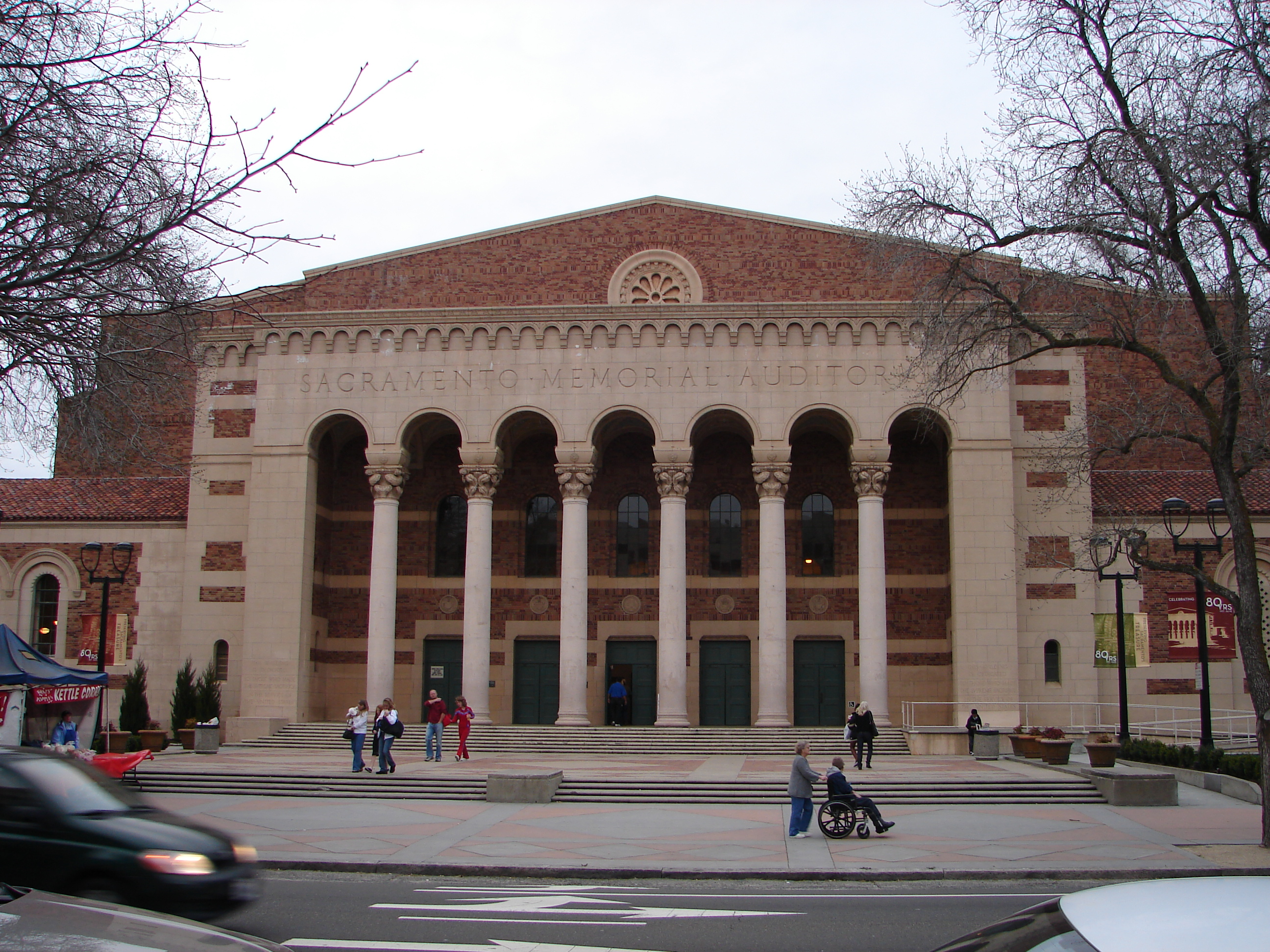
- Interactive map of Sacramento Memorial Auditorium
- Address: 1515 J Street
- Location: Sacramento, California, U.S.
- Capacity: 3,849
- Sacramento Memorial Auditorium
- U.S. National Register of Historic Places
- Location within Sacramento, California Location within California Location within the United States
- Coordinates: 38°34′44.1″N 121°29′08.5″W
- Area: 2.5 acres (1.0 ha)
- Built: 1926
- Architects: Dean & Dean
- Architectural style: southern European, Early Renaissance revival
- NRHP reference No.: 78000743
- Added to NRHP: March 29, 1978

Website
- Venue Website

The Sacramento Memorial Auditorium is a historic auditorium located in Sacramento, California. Completed in 1926, the Auditorium opened on February 22, 1927.

The building was constructed as a memorial to Sacramento County veterans of the Spanish-American War and World War I. A list of the county's war dead from those two conflicts can be found in the building's foyer, above the entry into the auditorium. Several plaques inside and outside the building honor military veterans, and etched on either side of the front entrance into the building are the words: "This building is dedicated to those who made the supreme sacrifice in the service of the United States."

Closed in 1986 due to seismic concerns, the building fell into disrepair, and re-opened in 1996, after renovation, as part of the Sacramento Convention Center Complex. The auditorium houses The Jean Runyon Little Theater and Memorial Hall. The main auditorium seats 3,849, while the Jean Runyon Little Theater seats 272.

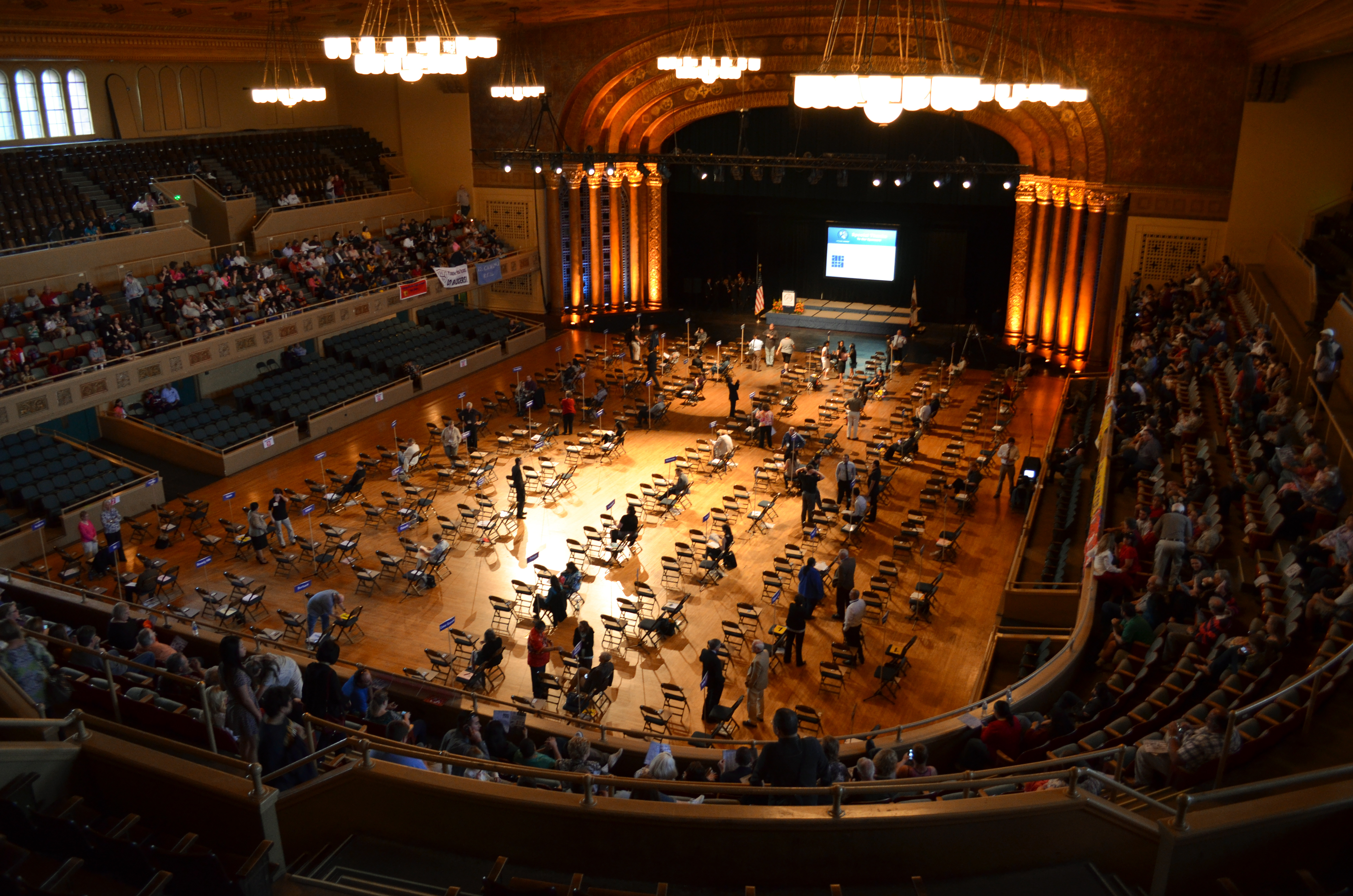
The interior of the auditorium during the 2014 California Academic Decathlon

== History ==
The auditorium was designed by local architect James S. Dean, with Arthur Brown, Jr. as consulting architect and G. Albert Lansburgh as a collaborating architect. The site previously was home to the Mary J. Waters Grammar School, a three-story brick building built in 1872 on land that was donated to the city by John A. Sutter. An unsuccessful suit was brought against the city by one of Sutter's heirs, arguing the land was donated for park and school use only. The auditorium broke ground in July 1925, presided by Senator Hiram Johnson, a former pupil at the school. The opening of the auditorium was a significant step in the growth of Sacramento and a way to bring famous entertainment, artists and conventions to Sacramento. The auditorium has held the inauguration balls for California governors James Rolph, Frank Merriam, Culbert Olson and Arnold Schwarzenegger. During a Rolling Stones show on December 3, 1965, Keith Richards was nearly electrocuted when playing their newly released single, The Last Time.

The auditorium was built of brick primarily from local origin, with stone, plaster, and terra cotta also being used. The architecture design can be described as Byzantine from the 5th and 6th centuries, with design inspirations taken from Italian Romanesque, Lombardic, and Spanish styles as well. The brick wall finish includes five shades of brick and protruding randomly in a Flemish bond. The five double front doors do not have built-in locks since the lobby was originally intended to be an open shrine for those who died in the Spanish-American War and World War I.

== Performances ==
Music acts that have performed at the auditorium include Will Rogers (1927), The Crickets (1957), The Beach Boys (1963),The Rolling Stones (1964, 1965 & 1966), The Righteous Brothers (1965), Ike & Tina Turner (1965), Sonny & Cher (1965), The Turtles (1967), The 5th Dimension (1967), Grateful Dead (1968), Jefferson Airplane (1968), The Doors (1968), Chicago as Chicago Transit Authority (1969), Derek and the Dominos (1970), Eric Burdon & War (1970), Frank Zappa (1971), Cheech & Chong (1972), Canned Heat (1972), Doobie Brothers (1972), The Eagles (1974), Steppenwolf (1974), Fleetwood Mac (1975), Journey (band) (1977), Sammy Hagar (1977), Toto (1977), Santana (1979), America (1979), Huey Lewis and the News (1979), Go-Go's (1982), Mötley Crüe (1983), Ratt (1984), Night Ranger (1984), Metallica (1985), Dishwalla (1997), John Fogerty (1997), Pantera (1997), Primus (1997), 311 (1997), Jane's Addiction (1997), Tool (1998), Sacramento's Deftones (1998), Sacramento's Cake (1999), The Offspring (1999), 98 Degrees (1999), Lit (1999), The Wallflowers (2000), System of a Down (2000), Linkin Park (2000), Incubus (2001), No Doubt (2002), Papa Roach (2002), Eve 6 (2003), Audioslave (2005), Avenged Sevenfold (2006), Pat Monahan (of Train) (2007), Stone Temple Pilots (2008), Atreyu (2009), Third Eye Blind (2015), Queens of the Stone Age (2018), Los Lobos (2019), Weird Al Yankovic (2019), and Bob Dylan (2022).

== See also ==
- Bobby Chacon vs. Rafael Limón- their historic fourth bout was held at the auditorium.
