= Ray Mancini vs. Bobby Chacon =

1984 boxing match

The Reno Rumble
- Date: January 14, 1984
- Venue: Lawlor Events Center, Reno, Nevada, U.S.
- Title on the line: WBA Lightweight title

Tale of the tape
Boxer	Ray Mancini	Bobby Chacon
Nickname	Boom Boom	Schoolboy
Hometown	Youngstown, Ohio, U.S.	Oroville, California, U.S.
Purse	$1,300,000	$575,000
Pre-fight record	28–1 (22 KO)	52–6–1 (42 KO)
Age	22 years, 10 months	32 years, 1 month
Height	5 ft 4 1/2 in (164 cm)	5 ft 5 1/2 in (166 cm)
Weight	134 lb (61 kg)	133 3/4 lb (61 kg)
Style	Orthodox	Orthodox
Recognition	WBA; Lightweight Champion; The Ring; No. 1 Ranked Lightweight	The Ring; No. 1 Ranked Super Featherweight; 2-division world champion

Result
- Mancini wins via 3rd-round technical knockout

Ray Mancini vs. Bobby Chacon, billed as The Reno Rumble, was a professional boxing match contested on January 14, 1984, for the WBA lightweight title.

== Background ==
A fight between WBA lightweight champion Ray Mancini and two-time super featherweight champion Bobby Chacon had been discussed throughout 1983 with the two fighters had come to a tentative agreement just prior to Mancini's title defense against Orlando Romero on September 15, 1983. In order for his fight with Chacon to move forward, Mancini would still need to get past Romero, who, while undefeated, had never fought outside his native Peru and was a massive underdog. Mancini, coming off a seven-month layoff due to a broken collarbone, labored through eight rounds and only had a narrow lead when he landed a big left hook which knocked out Romero in the ninth and gave Mancini the victory, preserving his fight with Chacon. Chacon, who was in attendance, would comment that he was "real nervous" that Mancini would lose which would have scrapped their planned fight.

Just days after defeating Romero, Mancini officially signed on to face Chacon with the date scheduled later in the year in either November or December. However, promoter Robert Andreoli announced the following month that the fight would be pushed back to February due to problems finding a venue for the fight and so as to avoid competition from the Marvin Hagler–Roberto Durán fight and Larry Holmes–Marvis Frazier fights that were both scheduled to take place in November. The postponement angered Mancini's manager David Wolf, who claimed Andreoli had broken a contract explicitly stating that the Mancini–Chacon fight would take place anywhere between November 18 and December 12. While Wolf would not rule out Mancini still facing Chacon on February, he also mentioned that he and Mancini would be looking to stage a non-title bout before the year was up. One week prior to the Holmes–Frazier fight set to take place on November 25, 1983, it was announced that Mancini would face Johnny Torres in what would be the featured undercard bout. Mancini would score an easy victory over Torres, knocking him out with two seconds remaining in the first round.

Chacon, who had won world titles in both the featherweight and super featherweight divisions, was making his lightweight debut and attempting to win his third world title in a third weight class. Coming into 1983, Chacon was the WBC super featherweight champion, having defeated Rafael Limón to capture the title in December 1982. However, he had fought only once in 1983, winning a non-title bout against Cornelius Boza-Edwards. He had been engaged in a legal battle with promoter Don King who claimed that Chacon had signed an agreement with him to face Héctor Camacho in Puerto Rico before pulling out of the bout due to financial disagreements and instead choosing to face Boza-Edwards. The WBC refused to sanction the Chacon–Boza-Edwards fight and stripped Chacon of their title one month after the Boza-Edwards fight. Chacon, who was still challenging King in court at the time of his fight with Mancini, was quoted as saying "I'm not only fighting Ray, I'm fighting Don King and (WBC President) José Sulaimán, too."

== Fight Details ==
After a conservative first minute of the fight, Mancini took control and dominated Chacon for the remainder of the bout. After that first minute, Mancini would get Chacon up against the ropes and hammer Chacon with power shots to the head and body, opening up cuts around Chacon's left eye and on the bridge of his nose. After a sluggish first round, Chacon came out more aggressive in the second, but was stunned by Mancini right and was again backed up into the ropes as Mancini landed several unanswered power punches though Chacon was able to regain composure and landed several shots of his own as Mancini tired and the round ended with both fighters trading punches in the center of the ring. Much like the previous two rounds, Mancini again backed Chacon up against the ropes in the third round, landing several more punches to the head and body of Chacon before catching him flush and hurting him with a left hook. Though the dazed Chacon attempted to fight back, Mancini was able to catch him with four big right hooks. Though Chacon had not been knocked down in the fight, the cuts on his face had begun to bleed profusely and referee Richard Steele decided that Chacon had had enough and stopped the fight at 1:17 of the third round, giving Mancini the knockout victory.

Though the ringside physician Dr. Donald Romeo claimed the stoppage was premature as he hadn't been consulted by Steele, Chacon and his trainer Jon Ponce agreed with the stoppage with Ponce stating he would've stopped the fight himself after the third round

== Aftermath ==
Mancini's victory over Chacon would prove to be the last of his career. Mancini would next face his mandatory challenger Livingstone Bramble that June, who upset Mancini via 14th-round technical knockout. Bramble would again defeat Mancini in their rematch in February 1985 after which Mancini retired at the age of 24, citing damage to his eyes and a desire to pursue an acting career as reasons. He made two one-off returns in 1989 and 1992, but lost both fights to Héctor Camacho and Greg Haugen respectively.

== Fight card ==
Confirmed bouts:

Weight Class	Weight		vs.		Method	Round	Notes
Lightweight	135 lbs.	Ray Mancini (c)	def.	Bobby Chacon	TKO	3/15	^{note 1}
Flyweight	112 lbs.	Joey Olivo	def.	Jose Manuel Diaz	TKO	5/10
Lightweight	135 lbs.	Adriano Arreola	def.	Joe Perez	TKO	7/10
Welterweight	147 lbs.	Frankie Davis	def.	Joe Hernandez	D	8
Lightweight	135 lbs.	Louie Espinoza	def.	Arnold White	KO	1/8
Heavyweight	200+ lbs.	Mark Lee	def.	Inoke Katoa	KO	1/8
Middleweight	160 lbs.	Carl Jones	def.	Dwayne Jameson	PTS	8

^Note 1 For WBA Lightweight Title

== Broadcasting ==
Country	Broadcaster
Puerto Rico	Telemundo
United States	HBO

Preceded by vs. Johnny Torres	Ray Mancini's bouts 14 January 1984	Succeeded by vs. Livingstone Bramble
Preceded by vs. Cornelius Boza Edwards	Bobby Chacon's bouts 14 January 1984	Succeeded by vs. Carlton Sparrow
