= Alexis Argüello =

Nicaraguan boxer (1952–2009)

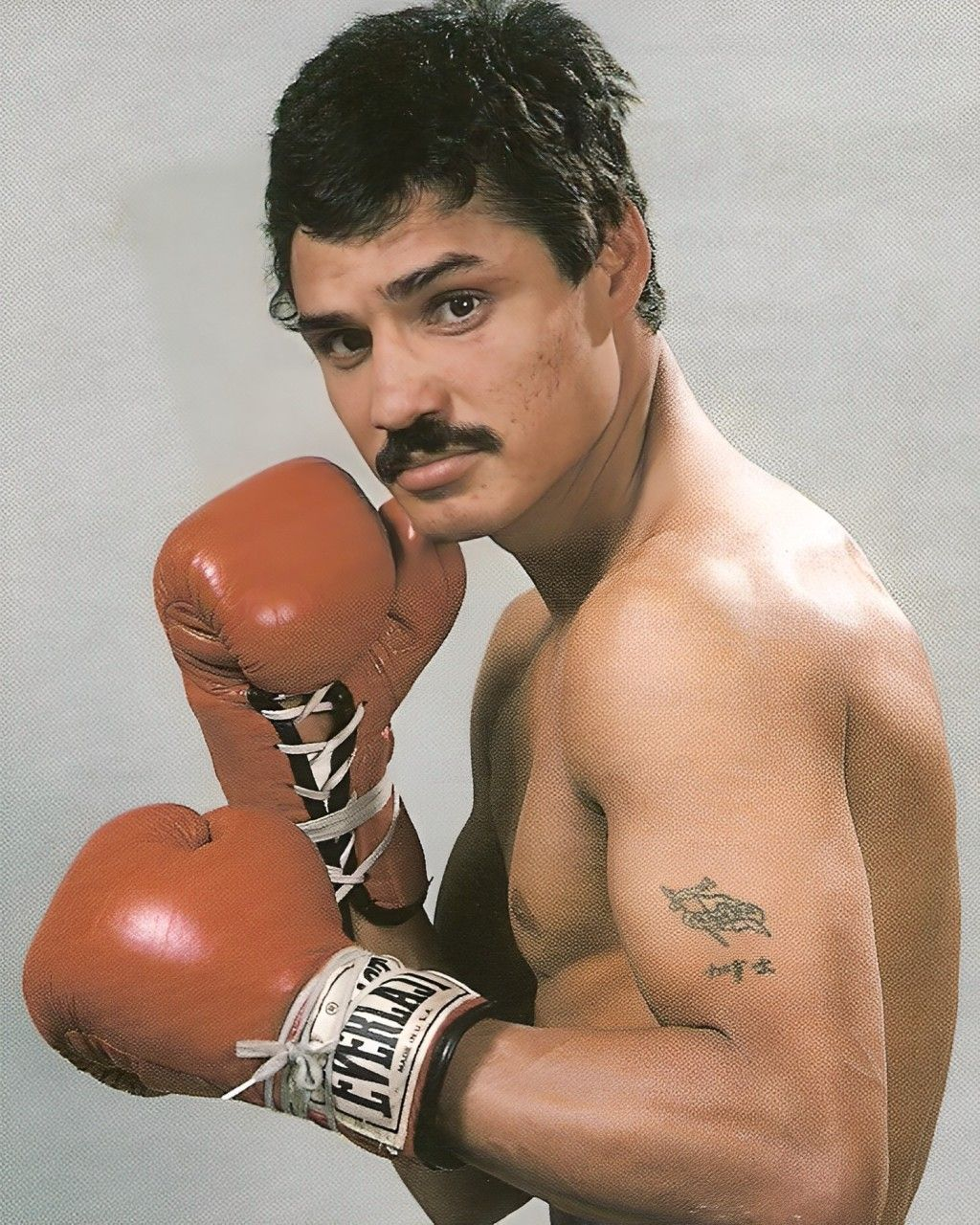
- Argüello c. 1984

Personal information
- Full name: Andrés Alexis Argüello Bohórquez
- Nicknames: El Flaco Explosivo ("The Explosive Thin Man"); El Caballero del Ring ("The Gentleman of the Ring")
- Born: April 19, 1952 Barrio Monseñor Lezcano, Managua, Nicaragua
- Died: July 1, 2009 (aged 57) Managua, Nicaragua
- Height: 5 ft 10 in (178 cm)
- Weight: Bantamweight; Featherweight; Super featherweight; Lightweight; Light welterweight; Welterweight

Boxing career
- Reach: 72 in (183 cm)
- Stance: Orthodox

Boxing record
- Total fights: 85
- Wins: 77
- Win by KO: 62
- Losses: 8

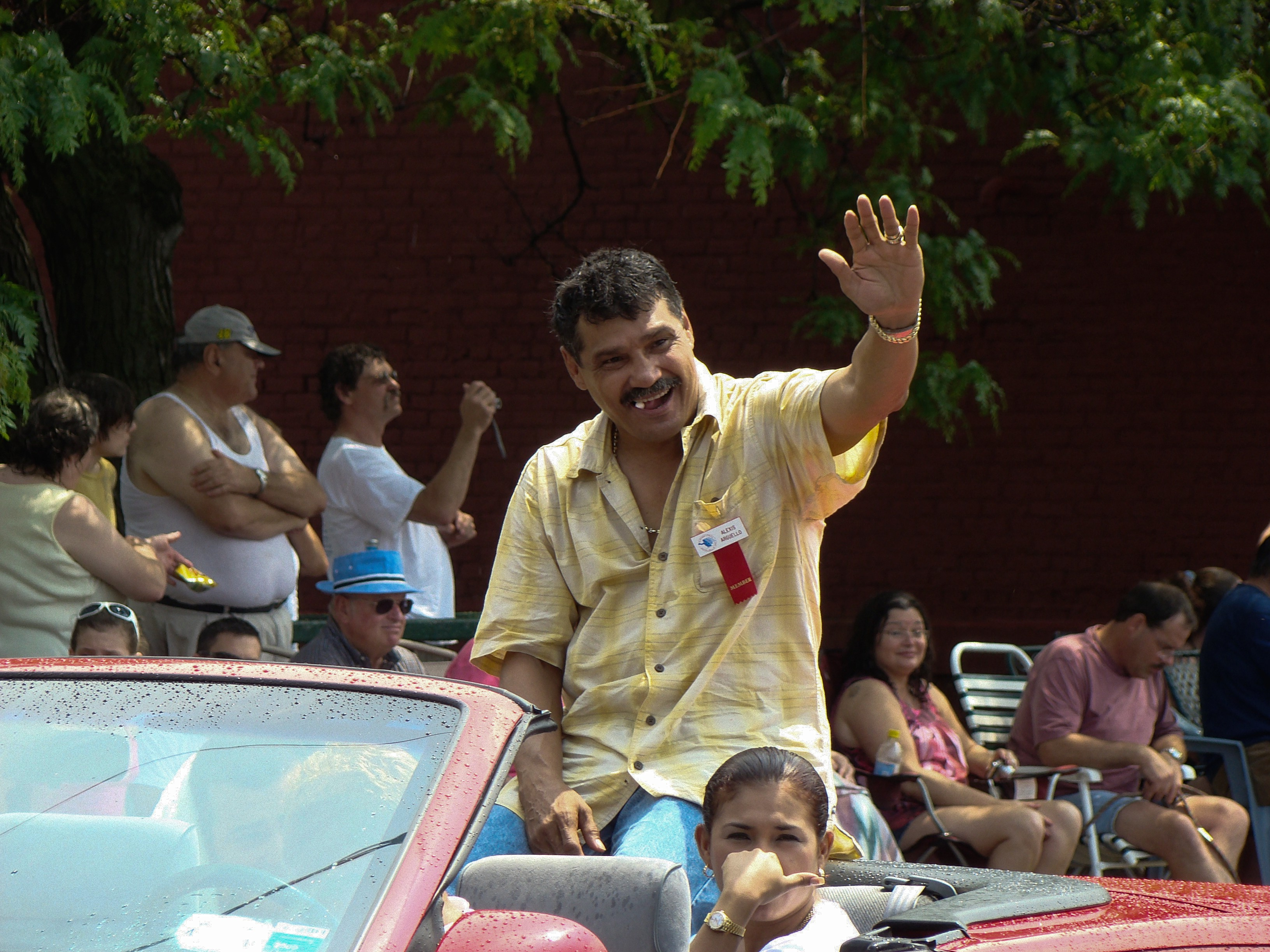
Parade of Champions at International Boxing Hall of Fame in Canastota, NY, 2008

Andrés Alexis Argüello Bohórquez (April 19, 1952 – July 1, 2009) was a Nicaraguan professional boxer who competed from 1968 to 1995, and later became a politician. He was a three-weight world champion, having held the WBA featherweight title from 1974 to 1976; the WBC super featherweight title from 1978 to 1980; and the WBC lightweight title from 1981 to 1982. Additionally, he held the Ring magazine and lineal featherweight titles from 1975 to 1977; the Ring lightweight title from 1981 to 1982; and the lineal lightweight title in 1982. In his later career, he challenged twice for light welterweight world titles, losing both times in famous fights against Aaron Pryor.

Argüello has regularly been cited as one of the greatest boxers of his era, having never lost any of his world titles in the ring, instead relinquishing them each time in pursuit of titles in higher weight classes. After his retirement from boxing, he became active in Nicaraguan politics and in November 2008 was elected mayor of his native Managua, the nation's capital city.

The Ring magazine has ranked Argüello as 20th on their list of "100 greatest punchers of all time", while the Associated Press ranked him as the world's best Junior Lightweight of the 20th century. He was named one of the 20 greatest fighters of the past 80 years by The Ring magazine and is widely regarded as one of the greatest boxers to ever come out of Latin America and one of the few to have fought in four different decades.

== Early life and amateur career ==
Argüello was born April 19, 1952. His father was a shoemaker. His mother was Zoila Rosa Bohórquez and his father was Guillermo Argüello Bonilla. He was one of five children. Argüello had a troubled childhood, growing up in abject poverty in Managua. When he was 5 years old, his father attempted suicide. At the age of 9, Argüello ran away to work in a dairy farm. When he was 13, he emigrated to Canada to provide for his family. Argüello was constantly involved in street brawls through his teenage years, but it wasn't until his sister Marina, one of Alexis' seven siblings, married a boxer that young Alexis took an interest in the sport. Argüello's brief amateur career saw him compile a 58–2 record.

== Boxing career ==
=== Featherweight ===
Argüello debuted on August 1, 1968. He was trained by former boxer Miguel Angel Rivas. After winning his first 3 fights, "The Explosive Thin Man" suffered an unavenged fourth-round KO loss, followed by another split decision loss. Argüello would then win 29 of his next 30 bouts over the next 5 years, including a win over José Legrá. Eventually, Argüello earned a world featherweight championship bout against experienced WBA champion Ernesto Marcel. The fight took place in Panama, Marcel's home country. The young challenger lost a 15-round unanimous decision in the champion's retirement bout. Months after Marcel's retirement, the WBA featherweight title was won by former unified bantamweight champion Rubén Olivares.

Undaunted, Argüello put together another streak of wins and found himself contending for the WBA featherweight, this time against Olivares in the latter's first defense. The fight took place at The Forum in Inglewood on November 23, 1974. After Olivares had built a small lead on the judges' scorecards, Argüello and Olivares landed simultaneous left hooks in round thirteen. Olivares's left hand caused a visible expression of pain on Argüello's face, but Argüello's left hand caused Olivares to crash hard against the canvas. A few seconds later, Argüello was the new featherweight champion of the world.

Argüello's first defense came against Venezuelan featherweight champion Leonel Hernández. Once again, Argüello fought in enemy territory, as the fight took place in Caracas. Nevertheless, Argüello made short work of his challenger, stopping him by technical knockout in the 8th round. His first defense in Nicaragua was against Rigoberto Riasco. Argüello dominated once again, this time stopping Riasco in the second round. Next up for Argüello would be Royal Kobayashi, a highly touted Japanese challenger who was undefeated until then. After a tense, close start, Argüello's relentless body-punching broke Kobayashi halfway through the fifth round, with the challenger dropping to the canvas twice.

=== Junior lightweight ===
After a successful fourth defense, Argüello moved up in weight to challenge world junior lightweight champion Alfredo Escalera in Bayamón, Puerto Rico, in what has been nicknamed The Bloody Battle of Bayamon by many. Escalera had been a busy champion with ten defenses, and he had dethroned Kuniaki Shibata in 2 rounds in Tokyo. In what some experts (including The Ring writers) consider one of the most brutal fights in history, Escalera had his eye, mouth and nose broken early but was rallying back in the scorecards when Argüello finished him, once again in the thirteenth round.

His reign at Junior Lightweight saw him fend off the challenges of Escalera in a rematch held at Rimini, Italy, as well as former and future world champion Bobby Chacon, future two-time world champion Rafael "Bazooka" Limón, Ruben Castillo, future champion Rolando Navarrete, and Diego Alcalá, beaten in only one round.

Argüello suffered many cuts around his face during his second victory against Escalera. The on-site doctor wanted him hospitalized, but Argüello had a flight to catch from Rome the next day to return to Nicaragua, and he boarded a train from Rimini. The doctor decided to travel with Argüello, and performed plastic surgery on Argüello's cuts with Argüello awake.

=== Lightweight ===
After eight successful title defenses, Argüello then moved up in weight again, and this time, he had to go to London, England, to challenge world lightweight champion Jim Watt. Watt lasted fifteen rounds, but the judges gave Argüello a unanimous 15-round decision, thus making him only the sixth boxer to win world titles in three divisions and the second Latin American (after Wilfred Benítez had become the first by beating Maurice Hope one month before) to do it. He had to face some lesser-known challengers in this division, one exception being the famous prospect Ray Mancini (known as "Boom Boom"). Mancini and Argüello engaged in a fight that was later showcased in a boxing video of the best fights of the 1980s, with Argüello prevailing by stoppage when he decked Mancini in round 14. After the fight, Argüello gained many American fans when he embraced Mancini and told a CBS television audience that he would do anything to help Mancini's father, who at the time was dealing with illness. Andrew Ganigan proved to be one of Argüello's toughest challenges as he dropped Argüello in the second round, but ultimately, the defending champion prevailed by stopping Ganigan in the fifth.

=== Junior welterweight ===
==== Battles with Aaron Pryor ====
Argüello successfully defended his lightweight title four times. After defeating James 'Bubba' Busceme by sixth round stoppage, Argüello decided to move up in weight class again, and on November 12, 1982, he tried to become the first world champion in four different categories, meeting the heavier and future Hall-of-Famer Aaron Pryor, in what was billed as "The Battle of the Champions" in Miami, Florida. Argüello was stopped in the 14th round. The fight sparked controversy because Pryor's trainer, Panama Lewis, introduced a second water bottle, which he described as "the bottle I mixed" after round 13, leading to speculation that the bottle was tainted. The Florida State Boxing Commission failed to administer a post-fight urinalysis, adding to speculation that the bottle contained an unsanctioned substance. Lewis claimed at various times that the bottle was filled with peppermint schnapps or Perrier to help Pryor deal with an upset stomach. It was later revealed in an interview with former Lewis-trained boxer Luis Resto that Lewis would break apart antihistamine pills used to treat asthma and pour the medicine into the water, giving Lewis's fighter greater lung capacity in the later rounds of a fight. Others say that there was a mixture of cocaine, honey and orange juice in the bottle.

A rematch was ordered. This time, in Las Vegas, Argüello was KO-ed in the tenth and stated after the fight, "I'm not going to fight anymore. I quit." But he later returned to the ring for financial reasons.

=== Comeback and post-retirement ===
During the 1980s, Argüello briefly fought with the Contras in his native Nicaragua, but after a few months in the jungle, he retired from the war. He then attempted several comebacks into boxing during the late 1980s and early 1990s and had some success, most notably a fourth round stoppage of former World Junior Welterweight Champion Billy Costello in a 1986 televised bout that put him in a position for another shot at the Junior Welterweight title. He retired for good in 1995 with a record of 82 wins, 8 losses, and 65 KOs, along with the recognition of being one of the sport's most universally respected fighters among fans, experts, and boxers.

Argüello was elected to the International Boxing Hall Of Fame in 1992. In 2008, he was honored by being selected as Nicaragua's flag-bearer at the Opening Ceremony of the Beijing Olympics.

== Political career ==
Argüello's brother, Eduardo José was killed in the Nicaraguan revolution fighting for the Sandinista National Liberation Front, and was considered a national hero in Nicaragua; a street was named after him. Argüello was actively involved in Nicaraguan politics with the Sandinista National Liberation Front (FSLN)--the same party against whom he took up arms in the 1980s—and in 2004 was elected vice-mayor of Managua. Amid accusations of vote-rigging, Argüello narrowly won the mayoral election in Managua on November 9, 2008 against the candidate of the Constitutionalist Liberal Party, Eduardo Montealegre, who had come second to Daniel Ortega in the 2006 presidential election. Argüello's margin of victory was narrow as he attained just 51.30% of the vote.

== Acting ==
Arguello had a large supporting role in the 1989 film, Fists of Steel, and small parts in other films.

== Death ==
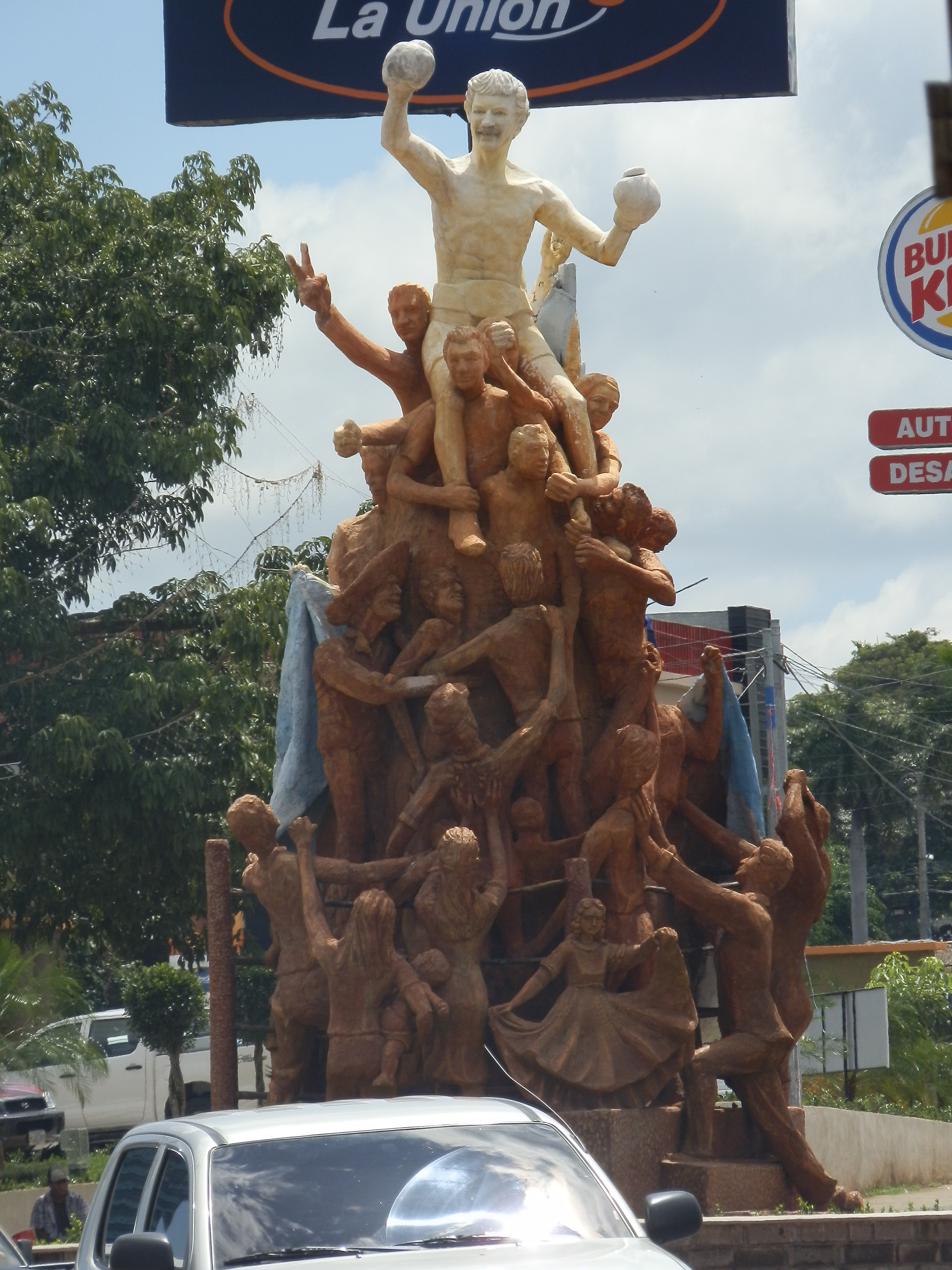
Memorial to Alexis Argüello in Managua

Argüello died on July 1, 2009, after being accused of shooting himself with two bullets through the heart in Managua. The national police, under Sandinista control, confirmed the death shortly afterward, and it was declared a suicide following an autopsy.

Those close to Argüello, including his daughter Dora Arguello and his sons, asserted that he was killed by Ortega's regime because he had become increasingly disenchanted with the Orteguistas and the Sandinista government, and was planning an imminent departure from the Sandinista political party.

== Professional boxing record ==
85 fights	77 wins	8 losses
By knockout	62	4
By decision	15	4

No.	Result	Record	Opponent	Type	Round, time	Date	Location	Notes
85	Loss	77–8	Scott Walker	UD	10	Jan 21, 1995	Arizona Charlie's Decatur, Las Vegas, Nevada, U.S.	
84	Win	77–7	Jorge Palomares	MD	10	Aug 27, 1994	Convention Center, Miami Beach, Florida, U.S.	
83	Win	76–7	Billy Costello	TKO	4 (10), 1:42	Feb 9, 1986	Lawlor Events Center, Reno, Nevada, U.S.	
82	Win	75–7	Pat Jefferson	TKO	5 (10), 2:47	Oct 25, 1985	Sullivan Arena, Anchorage, Alaska, U.S.	
81	Loss	74–7	Aaron Pryor	KO	10 (15), 1:48	Sep 9, 1983	Caesars Palace, Paradise, Nevada, U.S.	For WBA and The Ring light welterweight titles
80	Win	74–6	Claude Noel	TKO	3 (10), 0:37	Apr 24, 1983	Showboat, Atlantic City, New Jersey, U.S.	
79	Win	73–6	Vilomar Fernandez	UD	10	Feb 26, 1983	Freeman Coliseum, San Antonio, Texas, U.S.	
78	Loss	72–6	Aaron Pryor	TKO	14 (15), 1:06	Nov 12, 1982	Miami Orange Bowl, Miami, Florida, U.S.	For WBA and The Ring light welterweight titles
77	Win	72–5	Kevin Rooney	KO	2 (10), 3:07	Jul 31, 1982	Bally's Park Place, Atlantic City, New Jersey, U.S.	
76	Win	71–5	Andrew Ganigan	KO	5 (15), 3:09	May 22, 1982	The Aladdin, Paradise, Nevada, U.S.	Retained WBC and The Ring lightweight titles
75	Win	70–5	James Busceme	TKO	6 (15), 2:35	Feb 13, 1982	Civic Center Beaumont, Texas, U.S.	Retained WBC and The Ring lightweight titles
74	Win	69–5	Roberto Elizondo	KO	7 (15), 3:07	Nov 21, 1981	Showboat Hotel and Casino, Las Vegas, Nevada, U.S.	Retained WBC and The Ring lightweight titles
73	Win	68–5	Ray Mancini	TKO	14 (15), 1:44	Oct 3, 1981	Bally's Park Place, Atlantic City, New Jersey, U.S.	Retained WBC and The Ring lightweight titles
72	Win	67–5	Jim Watt	UD	15	Jun 20, 1981	Empire Pool, London, England	Won WBC and The Ring lightweight titles
71	Win	66–5	Robert Vasquez	TKO	3 (10), 2:55	Feb 7, 1981	Convention Center, Miami Beach, Florida, U.S.	
70	Win	65–5	José Luis Ramírez	SD	10	Nov 14, 1980	Jai-Alai Fronton, Miami, Florida, U.S.	
69	Win	64–5	Cornelius Boza-Edwards	TKO	8 (10)	Aug 9, 1980	Steel Pier, Atlantic City, New Jersey, U.S.	
68	Win	63–5	Rolando Navarrete	RTD	4 (15), 3:00	Apr 27, 1980	Hiram Bithorn Stadium, San Juan, Puerto Rico	Retained WBC super featherweight title
67	Win	62–5	Gerald Hayes	UD	10	Mar 31, 1980	Caesars Palace, Paradise, Nevada, U.S.	
66	Win	61–5	Ruben Castillo	TKO	11 (15), 2:03	Jan 20, 1980	Community Center, Tucson, Arizona, U.S.	Retained WBC super featherweight title
65	Win	60–5	Bobby Chacon	RTD	7 (15), 3:00	Nov 16, 1979	The Forum, Inglewood, California, U.S.	Retained WBC super featherweight title
64	Win	59–5	Rafael Limón	TKO	11 (15), 1:40	Jul 8, 1979	Felt Forum, New York City, New York, U.S.	Retained WBC super featherweight title
63	Win	58–5	Alfredo Escalera	TKO	13 (15), 1:24	Feb 4, 1979	Sports Palace, Rimini, Italy	Retained WBC super featherweight title
62	Win	57–5	Arturo Leon	UD	15	Nov 10, 1978	Caesars Palace, Paradise, Nevada, U.S.	Retained WBC super featherweight title
61	Loss	56–5	Vilomar Fernandez	MD	10	Jul 26, 1978	Madison Square Garden, New York City, New York, U.S.	
60	Win	56–4	Diego Alcala	KO	1 (15), 1:56	Jun 3, 1978	Roberto Clemente Coliseum, San Juan, Puerto Rico	Retained WBC super featherweight title
59	Win	55–4	Rey Tam	TKO	5 (15), 1:54	Apr 29, 1978	The Forum, Inglewood, California, U.S.	Retained WBC super featherweight title
58	Win	54–4	Mario Mendez	TKO	3 (10), 2:00	Mar 25, 1978	Caesars Palace, Paradise, Nevada, U.S.	
57	Win	53–4	Alfredo Escalera	TKO	13 (15), 2:36	Jan 28, 1978	Juan Ramón Loubriel Stadium, Bayamon, Puerto Rico	Won WBC super featherweight title
56	Win	52–4	Enrique Solis	KO	5 (10)	Dec 18, 1977	Estadio Anastasio Somoza García, Managua, Nicaragua	
55	Win	51–4	Jerome Artis	TKO	2 (10)	Sep 29, 1977	Madison Square Garden, New York City, New York, U.S.	
54	Win	50–4	Benjamin Ortiz	UD	10	Aug 27, 1977	Roberto Clemente Coliseum, San Juan, Puerto Rico	
53	Win	49–4	Jose Fernandez	TKO	1 (10), 2:06	Aug 3, 1977	Madison Square Garden, New York City, New York, U.S.	
52	Win	48–4	Ezequiel Sanchez	TKO	4 (10)	Jun 22, 1977	Madison Square Garden, New York City, New York, U.S.	
51	Win	47–4	Alberto Herrera	KO	1 (10)	May 14, 1977	Roberto Clemente Stadium, Masaya, Nicaragua	
50	Win	46–4	Godfrey Stevens	KO	2 (10)	Feb 19, 1977	Roberto Clemente Stadium, Masaya, Nicaragua	
49	Win	45–4	Salvador Torres	KO	3 (15), 1:25	Jun 19, 1976	The Forum, Inglewood, California, U.S.	Retained WBA and The Ring featherweight titles
48	Win	44–4	Modesto Concepcion	KO	2 (10)	Apr 10, 1976	Universidad, Managua, Nicaragua	
47	Win	43–4	Jose Torres	SD	10	Feb 1, 1976	Plaza de Toros Calafia, Mexicali, Mexico	
46	Win	42–4	Saul Montana	KO	3 (10)	Dec 20, 1975	Polideportivo España, Managua, Nicaragua	
45	Win	41–4	Royal Kobayashi	KO	5 (15), 2:47	Oct 12, 1975	Kuramae Kokugikan, Tokyo, Japan	Retained WBA and The Ring featherweight titles
44	Win	40–4	Rosalio Muro	TKO	2 (10), 2:54	Jul 18, 1975	Cow Palace, Daly City, California, U.S.	
43	Win	39–4	Rigoberto Riasco	TKO	2 (15), 2:00	May 31, 1975	Estadio Ron Flor de Cana, Granada, Nicaragua	Retained WBA featherweight title; Won vacant The Ring featherweight title
42	Win	38–4	Leonel Hernandez	TKO	8 (15), 2:52	Mar 15, 1975	Poliedro, Caracas, Venezuela	Retained WBA featherweight title
41	Win	37–4	Oscar Aparicio	UD	10	Feb 8, 1975	Nuevo Poliedro, San Salvador, El Salvador	
40	Win	36–4	Rubén Olivares	KO	13 (15), 1:20	Nov 23, 1974	The Forum, Inglewood, California, U.S.	Won WBA featherweight title
39	Win	35–4	Otoniel Martinez	KO	1 (10)	Sep 21, 1974	Roberto Clemente Stadium, Masaya, Nicaragua	
38	Win	34–4	Oscar Aparicio	PTS	12	Aug 24, 1974	Roberto Clemente Stadium, Masaya, Nicaragua	
37	Win	33–4	Art Hafey	KO	5 (10)	May 18, 1974	Roberto Clemente Stadium, Masaya, Nicaragua	
36	Win	32–4	Enrique Garcia	KO	3 (10)	Apr 27, 1974	Arena Kennedy, Managua, Nicaragua	
35	Loss	31–4	Ernesto Marcel	UD	15	Feb 16, 1974	Gimnasio Nuevo, Panama City, Panama	For WBA featherweight title
34	Win	31–3	Raul Martinez Mora	KO	1	Jan 12, 1974	Roberto Clemente Stadium, Masaya, Nicaragua	
33	Win	30–3	José Legrá	TKO	1 (10)	Nov 24, 1973	Roberto Clemente Stadium, Masaya, Nicaragua	
32	Win	29–3	Sigfrido Rodriguez	TKO	9 (10)	Oct 27, 1973	Arena Kennedy, Managua, Nicaragua	
31	Win	28–3	Nacho Lomeli	KO	1 (10), 2:33	Aug 25, 1973	Roberto Clemente Stadium, Masaya, Nicaragua	
30	Win	27–3	Octavio Gomez	KO	2 (10)	Jun 30, 1973	Arena Kennedy, Managua, Nicaragua	
29	Win	26–3	Kid Pascualito	TKO	3 (10)	May 26, 1973	Arena Kennedy, Managua, Nicaragua	
28	Win	25–3	Magallo Lozada	UD	10	Mar 31, 1973	Arena Kennedy, Managua, Nicaragua	
27	Win	24–3	Fernando Fernandez	TKO	2	Feb 24, 1973	Arena Kennedy, Managua, Nicaragua	
26	Win	23–3	Rafael Gonzalez	TKO	3	Dec 16, 1972	Arena Kennedy, Managua, Nicaragua	
25	Win	22–3	Memo Ortiz	KO	2 (10)	Nov 19, 1972	Arena Kennedy, Managua, Nicaragua	
24	Win	21–3	Memo Barrera	TKO	2	Oct 21, 1972	Arena Kennedy, Managua, Nicaragua	
23	Win	20–3	Jorge Benitez	KO	1	Sep 9, 1972	Estadio Thomas Cranshaw, Managua, Nicaragua	
22	Loss	19–3	Jorge Reyes	TKO	6 (10)	Jan 15, 1972	Estadio Thomas Cranshaw, Managua, Nicaragua	
21	Win	19–2	Vicente Worrel Jr.	KO	2 (10)	Dec 18, 1971	Estadio Thomas Cranshaw, Managua, Nicaragua	
20	Win	18–2	Reynaldo Mendoza	TKO	4	Oct 10, 1971	Managua, Nicaragua	
19	Win	17–2	Emilio Buitrago	UD	10	Oct 2, 1971	Estadio Thomas Cranshaw, Managua, Nicaragua	Won vacant Nicaraguan bantamweight title
18	Win	16–2	Catalino Alvarado	KO	1	Aug 14, 1971	Estadio Thomas Cranshaw, Managua, Nicaragua	
17	Win	15–2	Emilio Buitrago	TKO	5 (10)	Jul 17, 1971	Estadio Thomas Cranshaw, Managua, Nicaragua	
16	Win	14–2	Marcial Loyola	TKO	2	Jun 26, 1971	Estadio Thomas Cranshaw, Managua, Nicaragua	
15	Win	13–2	Kid Chapula	KO	1	Jun 5, 1971	Estadio Thomas Cranshaw, Managua, Nicaragua	
14	Win	12–2	Mauricio Buitrago	KO	7 (10)	May 1, 1971	Estadio Thomas Cranshaw, Managua, Nicaragua	
13	Win	11–2	Julio Hernandez	UD	10	Apr 17, 1971	Estadio Thomas Cranshaw, Managua, Nicaragua	
12	Win	10–2	Julio Hernandez	UD	10	Mar 13, 1971	Estadio Thomas Cranshaw, Managua, Nicaragua	
11	Win	9–2	Antonio Quiroz	KO	6 (8), 2:06	Feb 13, 1971	Estadio Thomas Cranshaw, Managua, Nicaragua	
10	Win	8–2	Armando Figueroa	TKO	1	Dec 19, 1970	Estadio Thomas Cranshaw, Managua, Nicaragua	
9	Win	7–2	Julio Morales	KO	3	Dec 5, 1970	Estadio Thomas Cranshaw, Managua, Nicaragua	
8	Win	6–2	Jose Urbina	KO	1	Nov 14, 1970	Estadio Thomas Cranshaw, Managua, Nicaragua	
7	Win	5–2	Mario Bojorque	KO	1 (6)	Sep 24, 1970	Estadio Thomas Cranshaw, Managua, Nicaragua	
6	Win	4–2	Marcelino Beckles	TKO	8 (8)	Sep 24, 1970	Gimnasio Nacional, San José, Costa Rica	
5	Loss	3–2	Oscar Espinosa	SD	6	Apr 26, 1969	Estadio Thomas Cranshaw, Managua, Nicaragua	
4	Loss	3–1	Omar Amaya	KO	4	Mar 1, 1969	León, Nicaragua	
3	Win	3–0	Burrito Martinez	TKO	3	Feb 15, 1969	Estadio Thomas Cranshaw, Managua, Nicaragua	
2	Win	2–0	Oscar Espinosa	SD	4	Dec 14, 1968	Estadio Thomas Cranshaw, Managua, Nicaragua	
1	Win	1–0	Israel Medina	KO	1 (4)	Oct 26, 1968	Estadio Thomas Cranshaw, Managua, Nicaragua	

== Titles in boxing ==
=== Major world titles ===
- WBA featherweight champion (126 lbs)
- WBC super featherweight champion (130 lbs)
- WBC lightweight champion (135 lbs)

=== The Ring magazine titles ===
- The Ring featherweight champion (126 lbs)
- The Ring lightweight champion (135 lbs)

=== Regional/International titles ===
- Nicaraguan bantamweight champion (118 lbs)

== See also ==
- List of WBA world champions
- List of WBC world champions
- List of lightweight boxing champions
- List of boxing triple champions

== Bibliography ==
- Giudice, Christian (2012). Beloved Warrior: The Rise and Fall of Alexis Argüello. Potomac Books. ISBN 978-1-59797-709-8.

Sporting positions
Regional boxing titles
Vacant Title last held by Leonel Urbina	Nicaraguan bantamweight champion October 2, 1971 – 1974; Vacated	Vacant Title next held by Moises Castro
World boxing titles
Preceded by Rubén Olivares	WBA featherweight champion November 23, 1974 – October 9, 1976; Vacated	Vacant Title next held by Rafael Ortega
Vacant Title last held by Clemente Sánchez	The Ring featherweight champion May 31, 1975 – June 20, 1977; Vacated	Vacant Title next held by Danny Lopez
Preceded by Alfredo Escalera	WBC super featherweight champion January 28, 1978 – November 1, 1980; Vacated	Vacant Title next held by Rafael Limón
Preceded by Jim Watt	WBC lightweight champion June 20, 1981 – February 15, 1983; Vacated	Vacant Title next held by Edwin Rosario
Preceded by Jim Watt	The Ring lightweight champion June 20, 1981 – February 1983; Vacated	Vacant Title next held by Julio César Chávez
Olympic Games
Preceded by Svitlana Kashchenko	Flag bearer for Nicaragua; Beijing 2008	Succeeded by Osmar Bravo
