= Sacramento Convention Center Complex =

Venue for large gatherings in California

The Sacramento Convention Center Complex is a complex of entertainment venues and a convention center located in downtown Sacramento, California. The complex consists of the SAFE Credit Union Performing Arts Center (formerly Community Center Theater), the Sacramento Memorial Auditorium, and the Jean Runyon Little Theater.

== Venues ==
=== SAFE Credit Union Convention Center ===
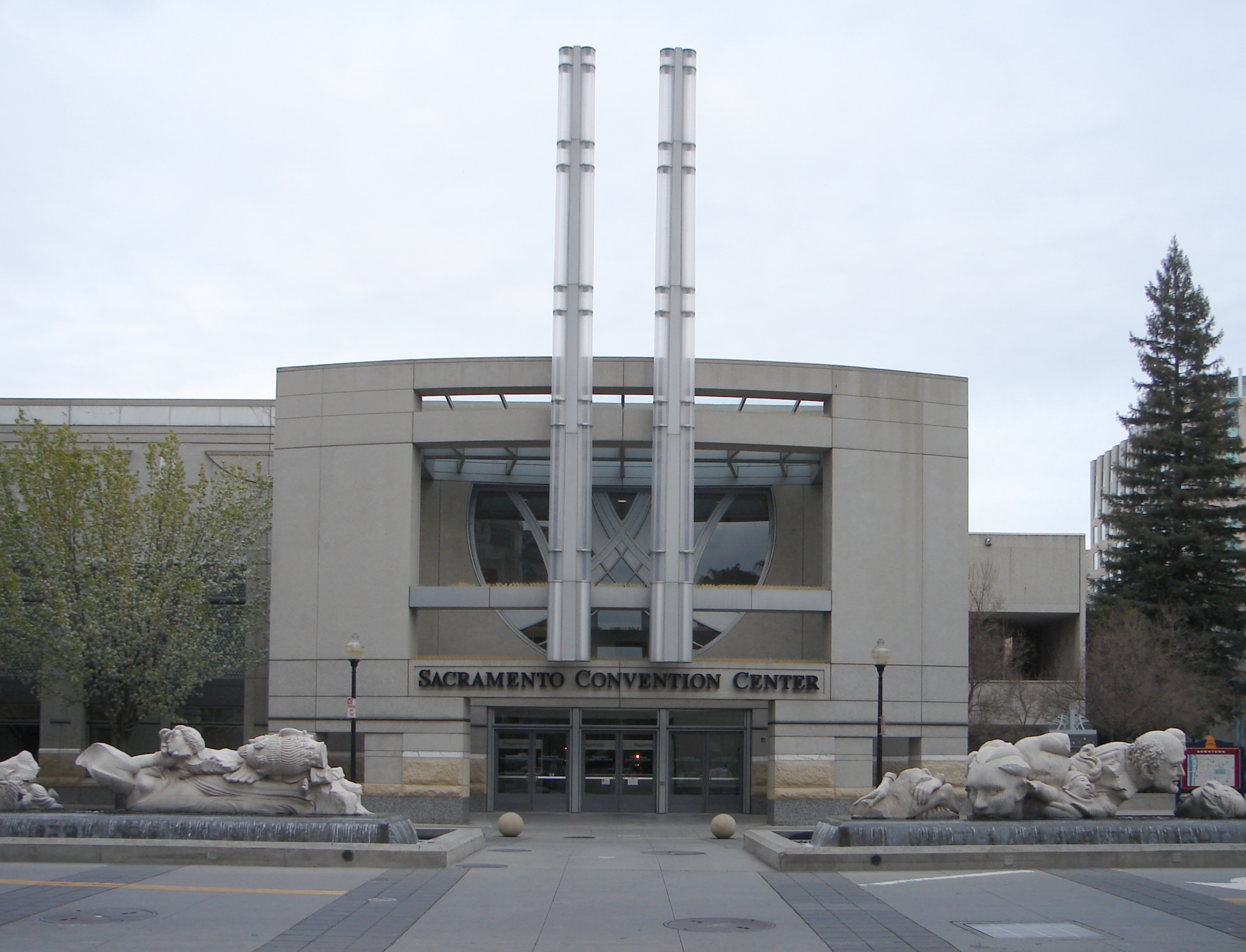
SAFE Credit Union Convention Center pre-renovation

The SAFE Credit Union Convention Center, located at 1400 J Street, is a convention and meeting venue. The Convention Center features an exhibit hall with 240,000 square feet (22,000 m^{2}) of programmable space, 160,000 square feet (15,000 m^{2}) of exhibit space, 2 ballrooms, and 37 meeting rooms. In 2019, the convention center underwent a major expansion, wherein the original 1974 portion of the convention center was torn down and rebuilt, adding more than 111,000 square feet (10,300 m^{2}) of space. SAFE Credit Union acquired the naming rights to the convention center for $23 million over 25 years. Construction started in July 2019 and completed in June 2021.

=== SAFE Credit Union Performing Arts Center ===
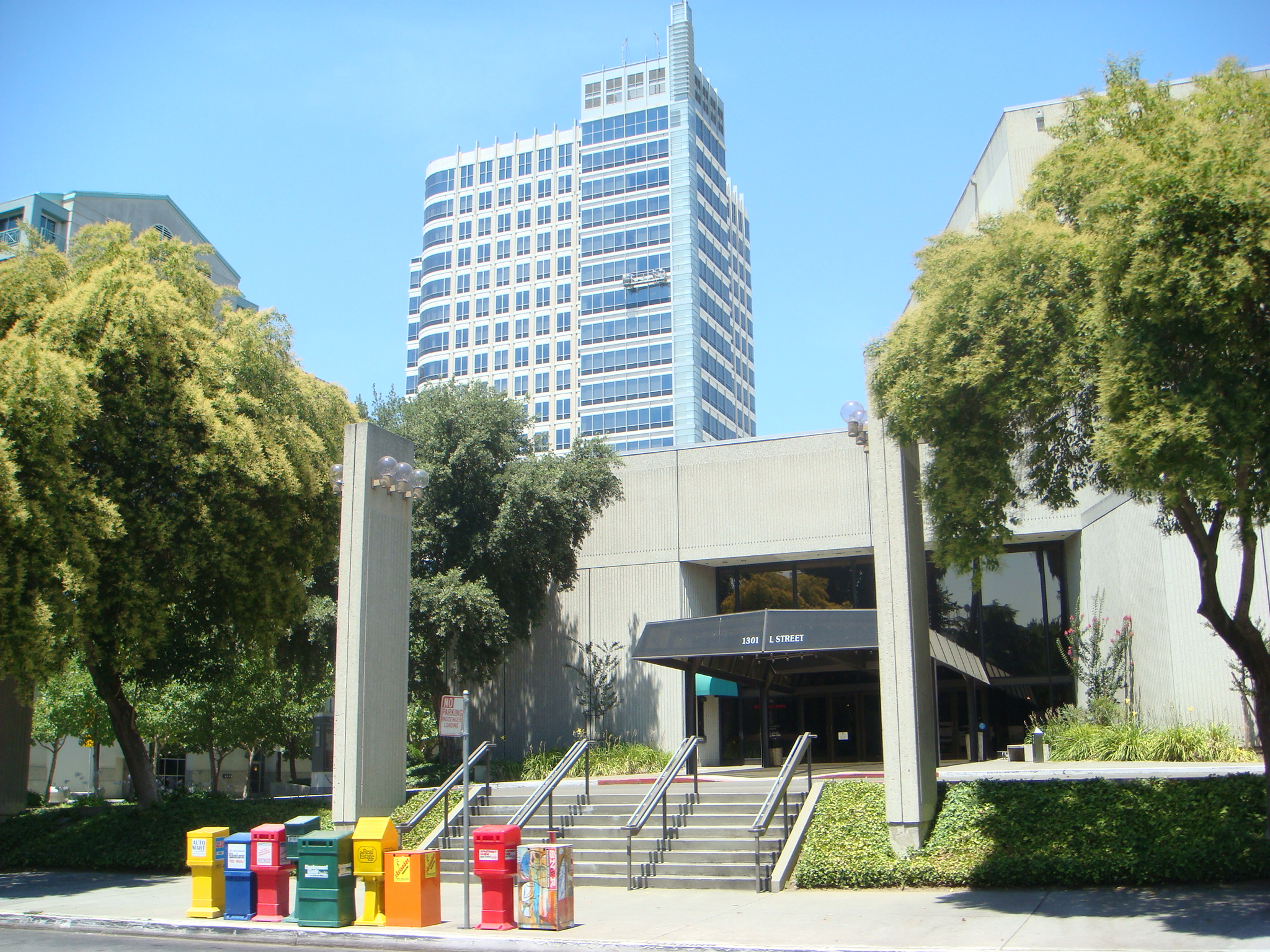
Community Center Theater as it appeared prior to its renovation in 2021

The SAFE Credit Union Performing Arts Center, formerly known as Community Center Theater, is a 2,452 seat entertainment venue located at 1301 L Street. The theater hosts national touring artists, and Sacramento performing arts groups such as the Sacramento Ballet and the Philharmonic Orchestra. The theater opened in 1974. Designed in the brutalist style, it underwent renovations for the first time in 2021, carried out by architectural firm DLR Group.

=== Sacramento Memorial Auditorium ===
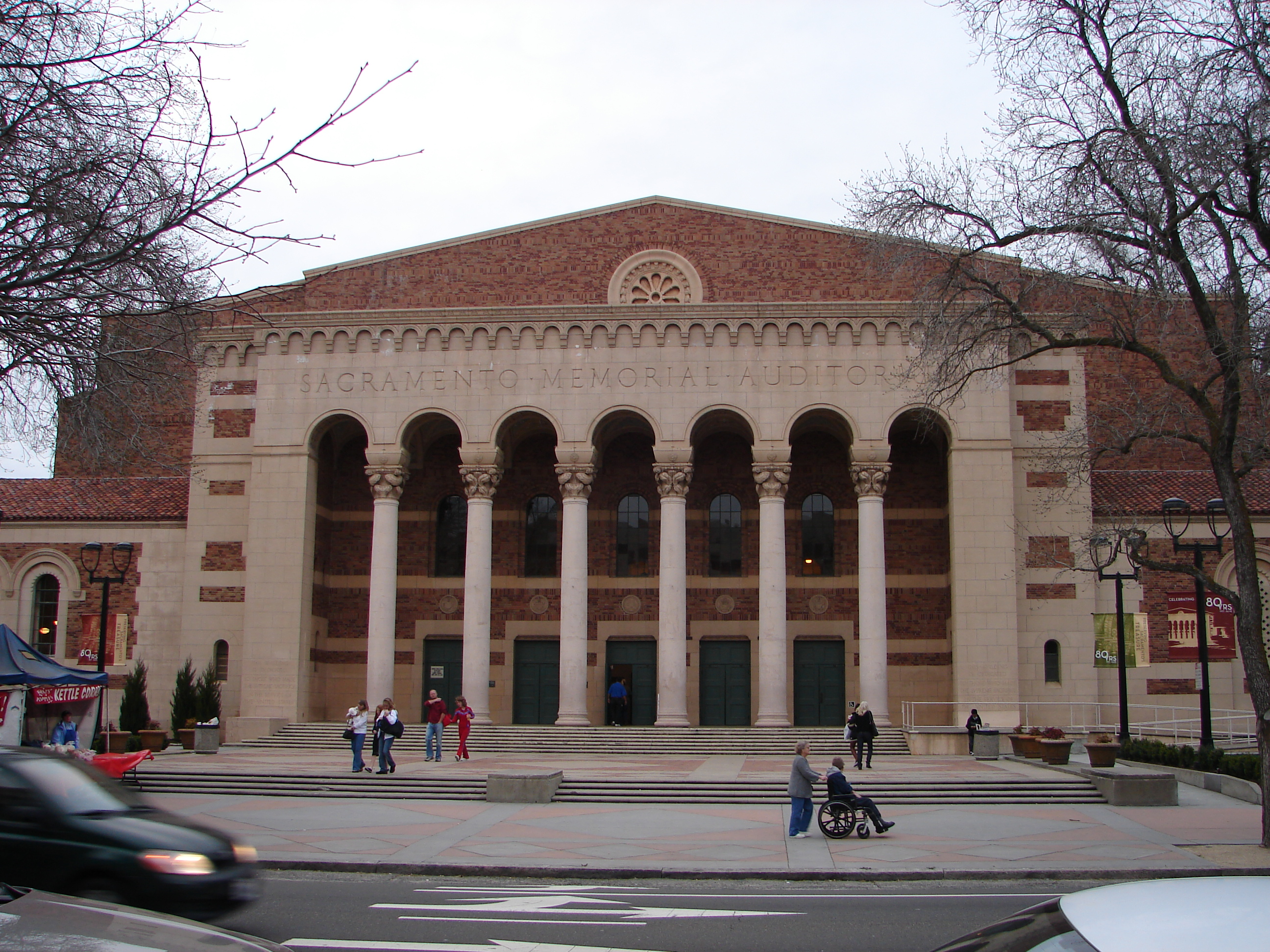
Sacramento Memorial Auditorium

The Sacramento Memorial Auditorium, located at 1515 J Street, is a 3,867 seat multi-purpose venue. Completed in 1926, the Auditorium opened in February, 1927. Closed in 1986, the building fell into disrepair, and re-opened in 1996, after renovation, as part of the Convention Center Complex. It is listed on the National Register of Historic Places. The Auditorium hosts a variety of events, including concerts, high school graduations, and hosted the 2007 inauguration of Governor Arnold Schwarzenegger.

California music acts that have performed at the auditorium include The Beach Boys (1963), The Righteous Brothers (1965), Ike & Tina Turner (1965), Sonny & Cher (1965), The Turtles (1967), The 5th Dimension (1967), Jefferson Airplane (1968), The Doors (1968), Chicago as Chicago Transit Authority (1969), Eric Burdon & War (1970), Frank Zappa in (1971), Cheech & Chong (1972), Canned Heat (1972), Doobie Brothers (1972), The Eagles (1974), Steppenwolf (1974), Fleetwood Mac (1975), Journey (band) (1977), Sammy Hagar (1977), Toto (1977), Santana (1979), America (1979), Huey Lewis and the News (1979), Go-Go's (1982), Mötley Crüe (1983), Ratt (1984), Night Ranger (1984), Metallica (1985), Dishwalla (1997), John Fogerty (1997), Primus (1997), 311 (1997), Jane's Addiction (1997), Tool (1998),Sacramento's Deftones (1998), Sacramento's Cake (1999), The Offspring (1999), 98 Degrees (1999), Lit (1999), The Wallflowers (2000), System of a Down (2000), Linkin Park (2000), Incubus (2001), No Doubt (2002), Papa Roach (2002), Eve 6 (2003), Audioslave (2005), Avenged Sevenfold (2006), Pat Monahan (of Train) (2007), Stone Temple Pilots (2008), Atreyu (2009), Third Eye Blind (2015), Queens of the Stone Age (2018), Los Lobos (2019), Weird Al Yankovic (2019), and Bob Dylan (2022).

In addition, the Grateful Dead have played at the auditorium a total of seven times - twice in 1968,, twice in 1970, and once in 1972, 1978, and 1979.

=== Jean Runyon Little Theater ===
The Jean Runyon Little Theater, located at 1515 J Street in the Memorial Auditorium (38.5783°N 121.4859°W), is a 272-seat entertainment venue for smaller events. On May 24, 2000, the space was dedicated to Jean Runyon for her contributions to the Sacramento theater community.

== See also ==
- Wells Fargo Pavilion
- List of convention centers in the United States
- Bobby Chacon vs. Rafael Limón- their historic fourth bout was held at the auditorium.
