= Cornelius Boza-Edwards =

Ugandan boxer

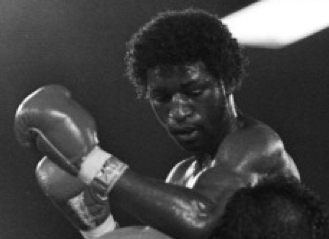

Personal information
- Nationality: (Uganda) Ugandan
- Born: 27 May 1956 (age 70) Kampala, Uganda
- Height: 5 ft 8 1/2 in (174 cm)
- Weight: Super featherweight; Lightweight

Boxing career
- Reach: 71 in (180 cm)
- Stance: Southpaw

Boxing record
- Total fights: 53
- Wins: 45
- Win by KO: 34
- Losses: 7
- Draws: 1

Cornelius Boza-Edwards (born Cornelius Bbosa; 27 May 1956) is a former professional boxer who is the former WBC Super Featherweight champion of the world. Born in Kampala, Uganda, he fought in both the super-featherweight and lightweight divisions. He emigrated from Uganda to England, where he lived for a long period. He now lives in the United States, where he trains other boxers.

== Amateur career ==
Boza-Edwards started boxing at the age of nine in Uganda alongside other notable fighters such as Ayub Kalule and John Mugabi. He moved to England with his mentor Jack Edwards and continued to box firstly with the New Enterprise club in Tottenham and then the Fitzroy Lodge club in South London. He boxed for England but was overlooked for selection for the Olympic team after being beaten on points by Pat Cowdell in the 1976 ABA championships.

Boza-Edwards was given another opportunity when he was scheduled to compete as a featherweight boxer for Uganda in the 1976 Montreal Olympics. However, Uganda boycotted the Montreal Olympics, as did many other African countries. The boycott deprived him of the chance of competing in the Olympics.

== Professional career ==
In 1976, Boza-Edwards turned professional with Mickey Duff as his manager and George Francis as his trainer. He changed his surname to Boza on the recommendation of Mickey Duff. As it was an easier name for the fans to remember and added Edwards out of respect for Jack Edwards his mentor.

Boza-Edwards won his first nine fights before suffering a loss to Des Gwilliam when he suffered a cut eye. He then went on an 18-fight winning streak and was offered a fight as a substitute against Alexis Arguello. He put up a spirited performance before being retired by his corner at the end of the eighth round. Arguello praised Boza-Edwards and said that he thought that he would become the champion after he had moved up in weight to the lightweight division. Boza-Edwards was actually boxing in the lightweight division at the time but moved down to the super-featherweight division.

== WBC Super-Featherweight Champion ==
In 1981, Boza-Edwards won the WBC World Super-Featherweight Title from Rafael "Bazooka" Limón with a fifteen-round decision at Stockton, California. Limón, a Mexican, had made his infamous "You know what happens to British boxers when they face Mexicans" comment. In reference to the fight between Lupe Pintor and Johnny Owen, after which Owen had died.

He defeated Bobby Chacon after he retired at the end of the thirteenth round in his first and only successful defence. He lost the title three months later in an upset to Rolando Navarrete, by knockout in round five. Navarrete had come in as a late substitute for Limón and shocked Boza-Edwards by knocking him down three times, the final time he was counted out.

== Later career ==
In 1982, Boza-Edwards won the European Super-featherweight title by defeating Carlos Hernandez of Spain after he retired in the fourth round. He then based himself in the United States and became a favourite on the television networks with his aggressive style of fighting.

He was meant to fight Bobby Chacon for the WBC World Super-Featherweight Title in 1983 but boxing politics meant that the WBC withdrew recognition of the fight, which went ahead anyway. Chacon won on points in a fight where both fighters were knocked down but needed 40 stitches afterwards. The fight was voted The Ring magazine Fight of the Year 1983. Following his loss to Chacon he fought Rocky Lockridge the former WBA super-featherweight champion and lost on points over ten rounds.

Boza-Edwards moved up to the lightweight division and earned a title shot against Héctor Camacho in 1986 for the WBC World Lightweight Title which he lost by decision over twelve rounds. His final shot at the title was in 1987 against José Luis Ramírez in Paris and he was knocked out in the fifth round of a fight for the WBC World Lightweight Title. Following this defeat he retired from boxing and became a trainer.

== Personal life ==
Boza-Edwards first wife Jackie died from kidney failure six months after giving birth to their daughter Michelle in the UK. He was nearly lost to the sport of boxing as a result of his grief but decided to continue. He remarried after relocating to the US and he and his wife Rumiko have two daughters, Dominique and Jenna.

== Mayweather Boxing Club ==
Boza-Edwards now runs the Mayweather Boxing Club in Las Vegas, NV. He was inducted into the Nevada Boxing Hall of fame in 2014

== Professional boxing record ==
| 53 fights | 45 wins | 7 losses |
|---|---|---|
| By knockout | 34 | 4 |
| By decision | 10 | 3 |
| By disqualification | 1 | 0 |
| Draws | 1 | |

| Result | Record | Opponent | Type | Round, time | Date | Location | Notes |
|---|---|---|---|---|---|---|---|
| Loss | 45–7–1 | (Mexico) José Luis Ramírez | KO | 5 (12) | 1987-10-10 | (France) Zenith Palais, Paris | For WBC World Lightweight Title. |
| Win | 45–6–1 | (United States) Ali Kareem Muhammad | UD | 10 (10) | 1987-07-09 | (United States) Felt Forum, New York | |
| Loss | 44–6–1 | (Puerto Rico) Héctor Camacho | UD | 12 (12) | 1986-09-26 | (United States) Abel Holtz Stadium, Miami Beach | For WBC World Lightweight Title. |
| Draw | 44–5–1 | (Guyana) Terrence Alli | PTS | 10 (10) | 1986-03-30 | (United States) Showboat Hotel & Casino, Las Vegas | |
| Win | 44–5 | (United States) John Montes | UD | 10 (10) | 1985-07-14 | (United States) Egypt Shrine Temple, Tampa | |
| Win | 43–5 | (United States) Melvin Paul | KO | 2 (10) | 1985-04-14 | (United Kingdom) York Hall, Bethnal Green | |
| Win | 42–5 | (United States) Gary Gamble | RTD | 4 (10) | 1985-03-17 | (United States) Egypt Shrine Temple, Tampa | |
| Win | 41–5 | (United States) Charlie Brown | TKO | 3 (10) | 1984-10-13 | (United Kingdom) Kings Hall, Belfast | |
| Win | 40–5 | (United States) Guy Villegas | TKO | 7 (10) | 1984-06-17 | (United States) Hyatt Regency, Tampa | |
| Win | 39–5 | (Barbados) Trevor Evelyn | RTD | 2 (10) | 1984-02-19 | (United States) Hyatt Regency, Tampa | |
| Loss | 38–5 | (United States) Rocky Lockridge | UD | 10 | Sep 9, 1983 | (United States) Caesars Palace, Outdoor Arena, Las Vegas | |
| Loss | 38–4 | (United States) Bobby Chacon | UD | 12 (12) | 1983-05-15 | (United States) Caesars Palace, Sports Pavilion, Las Vegas | The Ring magazine's "Fight of the Year" |
| Win | 38–3 | (Cuba) Pedro Laza | TKO | 9 (10) | 1983-02-27 | (United States) Showboat Hotel & Casino, Sports Pavilion, Las Vegas | |
| Win | 37–3 | (United States) Blaine Dickson | UD | 10 (10) | 1982-10-09 | (United States) Showboat Hotel & Casino, Las Vegas | |
| Win | 36–3 | (United States) Roberto Elizondo | UD | 10 (10) | 1982-06-26 | (United States) Showboat Hotel & Casino, Las Vegas | |
| Win | 35–3 | (United States) John Verderosa | TKO | 3 (10) | 1982-04-24 | (United States) Playboy Hotel & Casino, Atlantic City | |
| Win | 34–3 | (Spain) Carlos Hernandez | RTD | 4 (12) | 1982-03-17 | (United Kingdom) Royal Albert Hall, Kensington | Won EBU Super Featherweight Title. |
| Win | 33–3 | (United States) Arturo Leon | RTD | 4 (10) | 1982-02-09 | (United Kingdom) Royal Albert Hall, Kensington | |
| Win | 32–3 | (Chile) Juan Carlos Álvarez | TKO | 3 (10) | 1981-11-24 | (United Kingdom) Wembley Arena, Wembley | |
| Loss | 31–3 | (Philippines) Rolando Navarrete | KO | 5 (15) | 1981-08-29 | (Italy) Stadio de Pini, Viareggio | Lost WBC Super Featherweight Title. |
| Win | 31–2 | (United States) Bobby Chacon | RTD | 13 (15) | 1981-05-30 | (United States) Showboat Hotel & Casino, Las Vegas | Retained WBC Super Featherweight Title. |
| Win | 30–2 | (Mexico) Rafael Limón | UD | 15 (15) | 1981-03-08 | (United States) Civic Auditorium, Stockton | Won WBC Super Featherweight Title. |
| Win | 29–2 | (United States) Ramon Contreras | ud | 10 (10) | 1980-11-28 | (United States) Sports Arena, San Diego | |
| Win | 28–2 | (Mexico) Roberto Torres | TKO | 2 (10) | 1980-10-14 | (United Kingdom) Royal Albert Hall, Kensington | |
| Loss | 27–2 | (Nicaragua) Alexis Argüello | TKO | 8 (10) | 1980-08-09 | (United States) Superstar Theater - Resorts Atlantic City | |
| Win | 27–1 | (Spain) Jose Manuel Velazquez | TKO | 3 (10) | 1980-07-12 | (United Kingdom) Conference Centre, Wembley | |
| Win | 26–1 | (United States) Ronnie Green | TKO | 6 (10) | 1980-06-28 | (United Kingdom) Empire Pool, Wembley | |
| Win | 25–1 | (United States) Jerome Artis | TKO | 3 (8) | 1980-06-07 | (United Kingdom) Ibrox Park, Glasgow | |
| Win | 24–1 | (Puerto Rico) Benny Marquez | TKO | 4 (8) | 1980-04-22 | (United Kingdom) Royal Albert Hall, Kensington | |
| Win | 23–1 | (United States) James Washington | TKO | 2 (8) | 1980-04-01 | (United Kingdom) Conference Centre, Wembley | |
| Win | 22–1 | (United States) Fili Ramirez | TKO | 7 (10) | 1980-03-16 | (United States) Caesars Palace, Las Vegas | |
| Win | 21–1 | (United States) Jose Luis Gonzalez | KO | 3 (8) | 1979-11-03 | (United Kingdom) Kelvin Hall, Glasgow | |
| Win | 20–1 | (Dominican Republic) Fernando Jimenez | RTD | 6 (8) | 1979-06-24 | (Monaco) Chapiteau de l'Espace Fontvieille, Fontvieille | |
| Win | 19–1 | (Zambia) Godfrey Mwamba | TKO | 2 (8) | 1979-03-31 | (Zambia) Independence Stadium, Lusaka | |
| Win | 18–1 | (Spain) Pedro Jimenez | PTS | 6 (6) | 1979-03-04 | (Italy) Teatro Ariston, San Remo | |
| Win | 17–1 | (United States) Frankie Moultrie | SD | 8 (8) | 1979-01-13 | (United States) Convention Center, Miami Beach | |
| Win | 16–1 | (France) Georges Cotin | TKO | 1 (8) | 1978-12-18 | (United Kingdom) Hilton Hotel, Mayfair | |
| Win | 15–1 | (Zambia) Godfrey Mwamba | TKO | 3 (8) | 1978-11-04 | (Zambia) Lusaka | |
| Win | 14–1 | (United Kingdom) George Feeney | PTS | 8 (8) | 1978-09-26 | (United Kingdom) Empire Pool, Wembley | |
| Win | 13–1 | (Turkey) Ethem Oezakalin | TKO | 3 (8) | 1978-07-19 | (Italy) Municipal Stadium, Bellaria | |
| Win | 12–1 | (Venezuela) Carlos Foldes | DQ | 5 (8) | 1978-02-21 | (United Kingdom) Royal Albert Hall, Kensington | |
| Win | 11–1 | (United Kingdom) Dil Collins | KO | 5 (8) | 1977-12-06 | (United Kingdom) Royal Albert Hall, Kensington | |
| Win | 10–1 | (United Kingdom) Bingo Crooks | PTS | 8 (8) | 1977-11-08 | (United Kingdom) Empire Pool, Wembley | |
| Loss | 9–1 | (United Kingdom) Des Gwilliam | TKO | 6 (8) | 1977-09-27 | (United Kingdom) Empire Pool, Wembley | |
| Win | 9–0 | (France) Mario Oliveira | TKO | 2 (8) | 1977-06-14 | (United Kingdom) Empire Pool, Wembley | |
| Win | 8–0 | (United Kingdom) Tommy Glencross | TKO | 2 (8) | 1977-05-31 | (United Kingdom) Royal Albert Hall, Kensington | |
| Win | 7–0 | (United Kingdom) Billy Vivian | KO | 1 (6) | 1977-04-18 | (United Kingdom) Hilton Hotel, Mayfair | |
| Win | 6–0 | (United Kingdom) Godfrey Butler | KO | 2 (8) | 1977-03-16 | (United Kingdom) Midland Sporting Club, Civic Hall, Solihull | |
| Win | 5–0 | (United Kingdom) George McGurk | TKO | 1 (6) | 1977-02-14 | (United Kingdom) Hilton Hotel, Mayfair | |
| Win | 4–0 | (United Kingdom) Danny Connolly | TKO | 2 (6) | 1977-02-01 | (United Kingdom) Royal Albert Hall, Kensington | |
| Win | 3–0 | (United Kingdom) Tommy Wright | TKO | 1 (6) | 1977-01-25 | (United Kingdom) York Hall, Bethnal Green | |
| Win | 2–0 | (United Kingdom) Paul Clemit | TKO | 3 (6) | 1976-12-20 | (United Kingdom) Manor Place Baths, Walworth | |
| Win | 1–0 | (United Kingdom) Barry Price | KO | 6 (6) | 1976-12-13 | (United Kingdom) Hilton Hotel, Mayfair | Professional debut |

== See also ==
- List of super-featherweight boxing champions

Achievements
| Preceded by Rafael Limón | WBC super featherweight champion 8 March 1981 - 29 August 1981 | Succeeded by Rolando Navarrete |
Awards
| Preceded by Bobby Chacon UD15 Rafael Limón IV | The Ring magazine Fight of the Year; L12 Bobby Chacon II; 1983 | Succeeded by José Luis Ramírez KO4 Edwin Rosario II |
