= Shig Fukuyama =

Japanese boxer

Shig Fukuyama シゲ福山
Personal information
- Born: Shigefumi Fukuyama 福山茂文; January 28, 1950 (age 76) Kagoshima Prefecture, Japan
- Height: 5’6 1/2” (1.69m)
- Weight: Featherweight

Boxing career
- Stance: Orthodox

Boxing record
- Total fights: 47
- Wins: 27
- Win by KO: 20
- Losses: 20
- Draws: 3

Shig Fukuyama (シゲ福山, Shige Fukuyama), (born as Shigefumi Fukuyama, January 28, 1950) is a former Japanese professional boxer. Fukuyama was born in Kagoshima Prefecture, Japan, and is a resident of Los Angeles, California. In 1976 he fought and was defeated by D. K. Poison of Ghana.
