= Rafael Limón =

Mexican boxer

Personal information
- Nickname: Bazooka
- Born: Rafael Limón Burgos; 13 January 1954 (age 72) Tlaxco, Tlaxcala, Mexico
- Height: 5 ft 5 1/2 in (166 cm)
- Weight: Super featherweight; Lightweight

Boxing career
- Reach: 66 in (168 cm)
- Stance: Southpaw

Boxing record
- Total fights: 78
- Wins: 53
- Win by KO: 38
- Losses: 23
- Draws: 2

Rafael Limón Burgos, also known as Bazooka Limón (born 13 January 1954) is a Mexican former professional boxer who held the WBC super featherweight title twice between 1980 and 1982. He also challenged for the same title in 1979 and 1983.

== Biography ==
Rafael Limón was born on 13 January 1954. Growing up, he did not know his real father. He initially believed his father was a soldier who lived with his family when Limón was a toddler. The soldier was an alcoholic who was physically abusive to Limon's mother, a woman who had three sons, including Rafael, and one daughter. To escape his abuse, Limon's mother moved with her children to Mexico City when Limón was 4. When he was 15, Limon met his real father in a strange way: walking on the street one day, he was confronted by a man who tried snatching his purse. He punched the man and ran back home. The man then followed him and arrived at Limón's family's house a couple of minutes behind Limón, and then Limon's mother introduced them as biological father and son.

Later on, Limón, like the man who had been his father figure, joined the Mexican Army on February 14, 1972. Limón witnessed some friends boxing and was challenged by an on duty major to fight after he saw a friend get bloodied and found that funny. Limón found out he had talent for the sport and was sent to train with former professional boxer and noted trainer Kid Rapidez after three months learning to box while with the Army.

== Boxing career ==
Limón is best known for his four-bout rivalry with Bobby Chacon. Their first fight took place on 7 December 1975, in Mexicali, Mexico, Limón defeating a heavily favored Chacon in a ten-round unanimous decision (UD).

Negotiations took place in 1977–78 to pit Limón against WBA super featherweight champion, Samuel Serrano. However, the fight never took place.

Limón challenged WBC super featherweight champion Alexis Argüello in February 1979, suffering an 11th-round knockout (KO). Following this, he and Chacon met for the second time, with an accidental clash of heads resulting in a seven-round technical draw (TD). The pair met for a third time on 21 March 1980, in Los Angeles, Chacon earning a 10-round split decision (SD).

In spite of this, Limón found himself fighting later that year for the world title Arguello had vacated. Limón knocked out Venezuela's Idelfonso Bethelmy in the 15th round at Los Angeles to become the WBC super featherweight champion.

Limón made his first defense against England-based Ugandan Cornelius Boza-Edwards, losing a fifteen-round unanimous decision.

External audio
- You may watch Rafael "Bazooka Limón" fight Hector "Macho" Camacho on YouTube

In 1982, Rolando Navarrete was the WBC super featherweight champion, having dethroned Boza-Edwards by fifth-round KO. Limón knocked Navarrete out in round twelve to become a two-time world champion.

After defending his title successfully against Chung-Il Choi, Limón met Bobby Chacon for a fourth bout. Held on 11 December 1982, in Sacramento, it was their first meeting with a world championship at stake. Limón dropped Chacon in rounds three and ten, but Chacon turned the tables with only a few seconds left in round fifteen and knocked Limón down. Limón climbed the ropes to get to his feet to finish the fight, yet lost on the judges' cards in a close unanimous decision.

In 1983, Chacon refused to defend his world title against Héctor 'Macho' Camacho, so Limón traveled to Puerto Rico to meet Camacho. He was no match for Camacho, who defeated him in five rounds.

Limón went on boxing until 1994, losing to a number of future world champions and prominent boxers, including Julio César Chávez and Sharmba Mitchell, but never again challenged for a world title.

He retired with a record of 53-23-2 (38 KOs).

World boxing titles
Preceded by Alexis Argüello; Vacated	WBC super featherweight champion 11 December 1980 – 8 March 1981	Succeeded by Cornelius Boza-Edwards
Preceded by Rolando Navarrete	WBC super featherweight champion 29 May – 11 December 1982	Succeeded by Bobby Chacon

== See also ==
- List of WBC world champions
- List of Mexican boxing world champions
- List of left-handed boxers
