= Rolando Navarrete =

Filipino boxer

Personal information
- Nickname: Bad Boy from Dadiangas
- Nationality: (Philippines) Filipino
- Born: February 14, 1957 (age 69) General Santos, Philippines
- Height: 5 ft 5 in (165 cm)
- Weight: Bantamweight; Featherweight; Super-featherweight; Lightweight

Boxing career
- Reach: 65 1/2 in (166 cm)
- Stance: Southpaw

Boxing record
- Total fights: 74
- Wins: 56
- Win by KO: 33
- Losses: 15
- Draws: 3

Rolando Navarrete (born February 14, 1957) is a Filipino former professional boxer who competed from 1973 to 1991. He held the WBC super featherweight title from August 1981 and May 1982.

== Fighting style ==
A fine boxer, Navarrete was known for his hard-hitting punches. Categorized as a slugger and Filipino knockout artist.

== Professional career ==
He first fought for a world title in 1980 against Alexis Argüello but lost by TKO to the legendary champion. On August 29, 1981, he would win the WBC Super featherweight title by knocking out popular fellow southpaw Cornelius Boza-Edwards in the 5th round of a title match held in Italy. He later defended the title against unknown Choi Chung-Il of Korea, stopping the gritty challenger in the 11th round of a controversial bout held in Manila in January 1982. In his second title defense four months later in Las Vegas, Nevada, Navarrete took on Rafael "Bazooka" Limón. The champion led on all scorecards before getting knocked out by Limón in the 12th round. Thereafter, Navarrete's career went downhill and he would never again figure in big-money fights. In 1984, he was convicted of sexual assault and served three years in a Hawaii prison.

After his release in March 1988, Navarrete went back to the Philippines and embarked on several comeback fights. In one of those fights, he would exact revenge on his old tormentor Limón, winning by decision in a 10-round bout. During his comeback, he was cast alongside fellow boxer Rolando Bohol by comic book writer Carlo J. Caparas in his boxing film Kambal Na Kamao: Madugong Engkwentro, which was released in mid-1988. A series of losses against local fighters and unranked contenders later forced him to retire for good.

== Personal life ==
Navarrete currently lives in General Santos. A series of failed relationships with different women gave him a total of seven children. One of his sons, Rolando Jr., who fights under his mother's name Rolando Dy, is a professional mixed martial artist.

Troubles outside the ring left Navarrete with no money and the former world champion now sells fish that, according to him, earn him 800 pesos (about 16 dollars) a day. He still trains nowadays with a heavy bag in his home.

He spent three years in a United States prison for rape. Navarrete was also recently involved in various police complaints for wife battery and drugs.

On February 14, 2008, Navarrete, was pronounced out of danger, after being stabbed in the neck by Racman Saliling, a tenant at the boarding house he owns in Bula, General Santos, using an ice pick. Navarrete was also involved in two previous attacks: in 2005, he was hit with a steel pipe by a female neighbor and in 2006, a security guard clubbed his leg with a shotgun at a fishing port.

== Legacy ==
He is ranked the 9th best super featherweight champion in history, by the World Boxing Council. In 2007, Navarrete was included in "Kamao", an episode of award winning program Sine Totoo, which received the RP's first and only George Foster Peabody Award, the equivalent of the Pulitzer Prize.

"Kamao", presented the sports of boxing and featured the story of the former world featherweight champion.

== Professional boxing record ==
74 fights	56 wins	15 losses
By knockout	33	8
By decision	22	7
By disqualification	1	0
Draws	3	

No.	Result	Record	Opponent	Type	Round, time	Date	Location	Notes
74	Loss	56-15-3	William Magahin	TKO	6 (10)	Jul 31, 1991	Araneta Coliseum, Barangay Cubao, Quezon City, Philippines	
73	Loss	56-14-3	Bernabe Aliping	UD	10	Jun 8, 1991	Baguio City, Philippines	
72	Loss	56-13-3	Tae Jin Moon	TKO	9 (10), 1:45	Jul 20, 1990	Ninoy Aquino Stadium, District of Malate, Manila, Philippines	
71	Win	56-12-3	Ayuthaya Sithphakamron	KO	7 (10)	May 18, 1990	Ninoy Aquino Stadium, District of Malate, Manila, Philippines	
70	Loss	55-12-3	Ramon Marchena Jr.	TD	5 (12)	Feb 17, 1990	Mexico City, Distrito Federal, Mexico	For WBC International lightweight title
69	Loss	55-11-3	Tae Jin Moon	KO	6 (10)	Oct 13, 1989	Araneta Coliseum, Barangay Cubao, Quezon City, Philippines	
68	Win	55-10-3	Thongberm Lukmatulee	KO	3 (10)	Jul 11, 1989	Ninoy Aquino Stadium, District of Malate, Manila, Philippines	
67	Win	54-10-3	Ken Carter	TKO	1 (10), 1:03	Apr 22, 1989	Ninoy Aquino Stadium, District of Malate, Manila, Philippines	
66	Win	53-10-3	Dawthong Chuvatana	TKO	1 (10), 2:11	Feb 18, 1989	Ninoy Aquino Stadium, District of Malate, Manila, Philippines	
65	Win	52-10-3	Rafael Limón	UD	10	Dec 23, 1988	Rizal Memorial Sports Complex, Manila, Philippines	
64	Win	51-10-3	Jin-Shik Choi	TKO	6 (10), 2:39	Nov 5, 1988	Araneta Coliseum, Barangay Cubao, Quezon City, Philippines	
63	Win	50-10-3	Bisenti Santoso	TKO	2 (10)	Sep 16, 1988	Rizal Memorial Sports Complex, Manila, Philippines	
62	Win	49-10-3	Muhammed Juhari	UD	10	Jul 22, 1988	Rizal Memorial Sports Complex, Manila, Philippines	
61	Win	48-10-3	Elmer Leonardo	TKO	2 (10)	May 6, 1988	Araneta Coliseum, Barangay Cubao, Quezon City, Philippines	
60	Loss	47-10-3	Mario Martinez	TKO	5 (10), 2:59	Jun 23, 1984	Olympic Auditorium, Los Angeles, California, U.S.	
59	Win	47-9-3	Dennis Talbot	KO	2 (10)	Aug 12, 1983	Araneta Coliseum, Barangay Cubao, Quezon City, Philippines	
58	Win	46-9-3	Ignacio Jimenez	TKO	6 (10), 3:00	Jun 28, 1983	Blaisdell Center Arena, Honolulu, Hawaii, U.S.	
57	Win	45-9-3	Saul Mayren	TKO	6 (10), 2:26	Jan 28, 1983	Araneta Coliseum, Barangay Cubao, Quezon City, Philippines	
56	Win	44-9-3	Young-Se Oh	TKO	8 (10)	Sep 10, 1982	Araneta Coliseum, Barangay Cubao, Quezon City, Philippines	
55	Loss	43-9-3	Rafael Limón	KO	12 (15), 3:08	May 29, 1982	The Aladdin, Las Vegas, Nevada, U.S.	Lost WBC super-featherweight title
54	Win	43-8-3	Choi Chung-il	KO	11 (15), 1:35	Jan 16, 1982	Rizal Memorial Sports Complex, Manila, Philippines	Retained WBC super-featherweight title
53	Win	42-8-3	Cornelius Boza-Edwards	KO	5 (15), 1:41	Aug 29, 1981	Stadio de Pini, Viareggio, Italy	Won WBC super-featherweight title
52	Win	41-8-3	Blaine Dickson	UD	10	Jul 21, 1981	Blaisdell Center Arena, Honolulu, Hawaii, U.S.	
51	Win	40-8-3	Johnny Sato	UD	12	May 19, 1981	Blaisdell Center Arena, Honolulu, Hawaii, U.S.	Won NABF super-featherweight title
50	Win	39-8-3	Arturo Leon	UD	10	Apr 18, 1981	Blaisdell Center Arena, Honolulu, Hawaii, U.S.	
49	Win	38-8-3	Refugio Rojas	UD	10	Apr 7, 1981	Blaisdell Center Arena, Honolulu, Hawaii, U.S.	
48	Loss	37-8-3	Hector Cortez	UD	10	Mar 10, 1981	Blaisdell Center Arena, Honolulu, Hawaii, U.S.	
47	Win	37-7-3	Rocky Ramon	TKO	8 (10), 0:47	Jan 20, 1981	Blaisdell Center Arena, Honolulu, Hawaii, U.S.	
46	Loss	36-7-3	Alexis Argüello	RTD	4 (15), 3:00	Apr 27, 1980	Hiram Bithorn Stadium, San Juan, Puerto Rico	For WBC super-featherweight title
45	Win	36-6-3	Jerome Artis	TKO	7 (10), 2:33	Apr 1, 1980	Blaisdell Center Arena, Honolulu, Hawaii, U.S.	
44	Win	35-6-3	Frank Ahumada	UD	10	Jan 18, 1980	Rizal Memorial Coliseum, Manila, Philippines	
43	Win	34-6-3	Abdul Bey	TKO	7 (10), 1:31	Dec 18, 1979	Blaisdell Center Arena, Honolulu, Hawaii, U.S.	
42	Win	33-6-3	Blazer Okubo	TKO	3 (10), 0:51	Oct 9, 1979	Blaisdell Center Arena, Honolulu, Hawaii, U.S.	
41	Win	32-6-3	Miguel Meza	TKO	7 (10), 0:44	Aug 28, 1979	Blaisdell Center Arena, Honolulu, Hawaii, U.S.	
40	Win	31-6-3	Jose Torres	UD	10	Jul 24, 1979	Blaisdell Center Arena, Honolulu, Hawaii, U.S.	
39	Win	30-6-3	Frankie Duarte	UD	10	Jun 19, 1979	Blaisdell Center Arena, Honolulu, Hawaii U.S.	
38	Draw	29-6-3	Thanomchit Sukhothai	PTS	10	Mar 18, 1979	Cebu City, Philippines	
37	Win	29-6-2	Rey Tam	KO	4 (10)	Feb 16, 1979	Rizal Memorial Coliseum, Manila, Philippines	
36	Win	28-6-2	Pete Alferez	TKO	2 (10)	Jan 7, 1979	Cebu Coliseum, Cebu City, Philippines	
35	Win	27-6-2	Nene Jun	UD	12	Sep 30, 1978	Davao City, Philippines	
34	Win	26-6-2	Fernando Cabanela	UD	12	Aug 19, 1978	General Santos, Philippines	
33	Win	25-6-2	Nene Jun	MD	10	Jul 15, 1978	General Santos, Philippines	
32	Win	24-6-2	Tony Jumao-As	TKO	4 (10)	May 27, 1978	Cebu City, Philippines	
31	Loss	23-6-2	Johnny Sato	TKO	8 (10)	Dec 31, 1977	Cagayan de Oro City, Philippines	
30	Loss	23-5-2	Thanomchit Sukhothai	TKO	9 (10)	Sep 2, 1977	Rizal Memorial Coliseum, Manila, Philippines	
29	Win	23-4-2	Ric Quijano	PTS	10	Aug 12, 1977	Davao City, Philippines	
28	Loss	22-4-2	Yung-Shik Kim	SD	12	Jun 16, 1977	Seoul, South Korea	For vacant OPBF bantamweight title
27	Win	22-3-2	Mario Odias	UD	10	Jan 29, 1977	Cebu City, Philippines	
26	Win	21-3-2	Yung-Shik Kim	TKO	7 (10)	Nov 13, 1976	Cebu City, Philippines	
25	Win	20-3-2	Renato Paulino	KO	4 (10)	Sep 25, 1976	Cebu City, Philippines	
23	Win	19-3-2	Pol Ladeza	TKO	1 (10)	Aug 21, 1976	Cagayan de Oro City, Philippines	
23	Win	18-3-2	San Sacristan	TKO	7 (10)	Jul 31, 1976	Cebu City, Philippines	
22	Loss	17-3-2	Paul Ferreri	PTS	10	Jun 26, 1976	Cebu Coliseum, Cebu City, Philippines	
21	Win	17-2-2	Dommy Marolena	UD	10	May 15, 1976	Cebu City, Philippines	
20	Win	16-2-2	Bernabe Villacampo	TKO	2 (10)	Jan 31, 1976	Cebu City, Philippines	
19	Loss	15-2-2	Fernando Cabanela	UD	12	Oct 1, 1975	Araneta Coliseum, Barangay Cubao, Quezon City, Philippines	Lost Philippines GAB bantamweight title
18	Win	15-1-2	Danny Reyes	TKO	6 (10)	Aug 31, 1975	General Santos, Philippines	
17	Win	14-1-2	Go Mifune	TKO	2 (10)	Aug 1, 1975	Rizal Memorial Coliseum, Manila, Philippines	
16	Win	13-1-2	Rey Naduma Jr.	TKO	3 (10)	Jun 14, 1975	General Santos, Philippines	
15	Win	12-1-2	San Sacristan	KO	4 (10)	Mar 14, 1975	Araneta Coliseum, Barangay Cubao, Quezon City, Philippines	
14	Win	11-1-2	Conrado Vasquez	UD	12	Feb 15, 1975	General Santos, Philippines	Won Philippines GAB bantamweight title
13	Win	10-1-2	Rene Cruz Jr.	TKO	7 (10)	Jan 24, 1975	Rizal Memorial Coliseum, Manila, Philippines	
12	Win	9-1-2	Dodo Quilario	MD	10	Nov 29, 1974	Davao City, Philippines	
11	Win	8-1-2	Willie Abenir	UD	10	Oct 18, 1974	Santa Ana Park (PRC), Manila, Philippines	
10	Loss	7-1-2	Roberto Cinco	MD	10	Jul 20, 1974	General Santos, Philippines	
9	Draw	7-0-2	Julius Gonzaga	PTS	10	Jun 12, 1974	General Santos, Philippines	
8	Win	7-0-1	Mar Belimac	TKO	6 (6)	Dec 22, 1973	General Santos, Philippines	
7	Win	6-0-1	Ernie Sun	TKO	2 (8)	Nov 24, 1973	General Santos, Philippines	
6	Draw	5-0-1	Jimmie Verongue	PTS	8	Nov 10, 1973	General Santos, Philippines	
5	Win	5-0	Cris Espinosa	UD	8	Oct 13, 1973	General Santos, Philippines	
4	Win	4-0	Abdul Maratan	UD	6	Jun 23, 1973	General Santos, Philippines	
3	Win	3-0	Cris Espinosa	DQ	? (6)	Apr 14, 1973	General Santos, Philippines	
2	Win	2-0	Quirino Peligro	UD	6	Mar 24, 1973	General Santos, Philippines	
1	Win	1-0	Eddie Clementos	UD	4	Feb 17, 1973	General Santos, Philippines	

== See also ==
- List of super-featherweight boxing champions

Achievements
Preceded by Cornelius Boza-Edwards	WBC super-featherweight champion August 29, 1981 – May 29, 1982	Succeeded by Rafael Limón
