= 21st Buil Film Awards =

2012 Korean award ceremony

- Date: October 5, 2012
- Site: Haeundae Grand Hotel, Haeundae, Busan
- Hosted by: Kwak Kyung-taek; Ye Ji-won

The 21st Buil Film Awards (Korean: 부일영화상) ceremony was hosted by the Busan-based daily newspaper Busan Ilbo. It was held on October 5, 2012 at the Haeundae Grand Hotel's Grand Ballroom in Busan, and was emceed by director Kwak Kyung-taek and actress Ye Ji-won.

== Nominations and winners ==
Complete list of nominees and winners:

(Winners denoted in bold)

| Best Film | Best Director |
|---|---|
| **A Muse**; Architecture 101; The Day He Arrives; Helpless; In Another Country; The King of Pigs; Nameless Gangster: Rules of the Time | **Lee Han** - **Punch**; Byun Young-joo - Helpless; Choi Dong-hoon - The Thieves; Hong Sang-soo - The Day He Arrives; Hong Sang-soo - In Another Country; Kim Il-ran, Hong Ji-you - Two Doors; Yoon Jong-bin - Nameless Gangster: Rules of the Time |
| Best Actor | Best Actress |
| **Choi Min-sik** - **Nameless Gangster: Rules of the Time**; Ahn Sung-ki - Unbowed; Ha Jung-woo - Nameless Gangster: Rules of the Time; Kim Yoon-seok - Punch; Yoo Ah-in - Punch; Yoo Jun-sang - In Another Country | **Kim Min-hee** - **Helpless**; Isabelle Huppert - In Another Country; Hwang Jeong-min - Jesus Hospital; Im Soo-jung - All About My Wife; Jo Yeo-jeong - The Concubine |
| Best Supporting Actor | Best Supporting Actress |
| **Cho Jin-woong** - **Nameless Gangster: Rules of the Time**; Jo Jung-suk - Architecture 101; Jo Sung-ha - Helpless; Kim In-kwon - My Way; Kim Mu-yeol - A Muse; Kwak Do-won - Nameless Gangster: Rules of the Time; Ryu Seung-ryong - All About My Wife | **Park Ji-young** - **The Concubine**; Kim Bo-kyung - The Day He Arrives; Kim Hae-sook - The Thieves; Kim Hyo-jin - The Taste of Money; Moon So-ri - In Another Country; Youn Yuh-jung - The Taste of Money |
| Best New Actor | Best New Actress |
| **Kim Sung-kyun** - **Nameless Gangster: Rules of the Time**; Jo Jung-suk - Architecture 101; Joo Won - S.I.U.; Kim Soo-hyun - The Thieves; Lee Paul - Stateless Things | **Kim Go-eun** - **A Muse**; Bae Suzy - Architecture 101; Go Ara - Papa; Kim Hye-eun - Nameless Gangster: Rules of the Time; Nam Ji-hyun - A Reason to Live |
| Best New Director | Best Screenplay |
| **Lee Kwang-kuk** - **Romance Joe**; Kim Jho Gwangsoo - Two Weddings and a Funeral; Lee Yong-ju - Architecture 101; Shin A-ga, Lee Sang-cheol - Jesus Hospital; Yeon Sang-ho - The King of Pigs | **Lee Yong-ju** - **Architecture 101**; Heo Sung-hye, Min Kyu-dong - All About My Wife; Yeon Sang-ho - The King of Pigs; Yoon Jong-bin - Nameless Gangster: Rules of the Time |
| Best Cinematography | Best Art Direction |
| **Choi Young-hwan** - **The Thieves**; Choi Sang-ho - Perfect Game; Go Nak-seon - Nameless Gangster: Rules of the Time; Hwang Ki-seok - The Concubine; Jo Sang-yoon - Architecture 101; Kim Hyung-koo - The Day He Arrives; Kim Woo-hyung - The Taste of Money | **Lee Ha-jun** - **The Thieves**; Cho Geun-hyun - The Concubine; Cho Hwa-sung - Nameless Gangster: Rules of the Time; Kim Yeong-hee, Kim Joon - The Taste of Money; Lee Ha-jun - Hindsight |
| Best Music | Buil Readers' Jury Award |
| **Kim Hong-jib** - **The Taste of Money**; Ham Hyeon-sang - Duresori: The Voice of the East; Jo Yeong-wook - Nameless Gangster: Rules of the Time; Lee Ji-soo - Architecture 101; Yeon Ri-mok - A Muse | **The Thieves** |
Yu Hyun-mok Film Arts Award
**Hong Sang-soo**
