= Yu Oh-seong =

South Korean actor (born 1966)

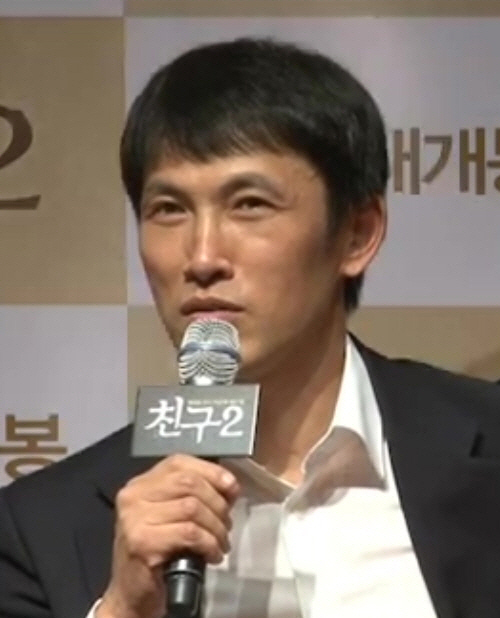
- Yu in 2013
- Born: September 11, 1966 (age 60); Yeongwol County, South Korea
- Other names: Yoo Oh-sung; Yoo Oh-seong
- Education: Hanyang University - Theater and Film
- Occupation: Actor
- Years active: 1992–present
- Family: Yu Sang-beom

Korean name
- Hangul: 유오성
- Hanja: 劉五性
- RR: Yu Oseong
- MR: Yu Osŏng

Yu Oh-seong (Korean: 유오성; born September 11, 1966) is a South Korean actor. He is best known for his roles in Beat (1997), Attack the Gas Station (1999), Friend (2001) and Champion (2002).

== Career ==
Yu Oh-seong made his stage debut in 1992, and throughout the mid-1990s, he complemented a career in television with minor roles in film. With his success playing a young gangster in the hit movie Beat (1997), Yu's face became familiar to a new generation of moviegoers. The year 1999 was somewhat of a breakthrough for Yu, as he took the lead role in Jang Jin's acclaimed cult comedy, The Spy and also starred in Kim Sang-jin's hugely successful Attack the Gas Station.

His career reached its peak in 2001. Appearing as Jang Dong-gun's co-star in Kwak Kyung-taek's smash hit Friend, which sold an unprecedented 8 million tickets, Yu won effusive critical praise for his hard-edged performance as a ruthless gangster and enjoyed a tremendous degree of exposure.

This fame would carry over somewhat when he took the lead in director Kwak's fourth feature Champion, a 1980s-set biopic of boxer Kim Deuk-gu, who dominated the Korean boxing scene until his death after the World Boxing Association lightweight championship in 1982. However, even though Yu was praised for his body makeover and acting skills, the film failed to deliver on the high expectations that preceded it. Later that year, a series of highly public disagreements with Kwak, believed to stem from money problems, made headlines and served to cool some of the public's interest in the actor.

Yu's next two films, the melodrama Star with actress Park Jin-hee and the patriotic/historical drama Thomas An Jung-geun about the titular independence activist, bombed badly at the box office.

He returned to television in 2004, headlining his first historical drama series (sageuk) Jang Gil-san. Set in the Joseon period during the reign of King Sukjong, Jang Gil-san was born of a female servant, raised by gypsies, then rises politically.

For the contemporary drama Invisible Man in 2006, he played a man in his thirties battling early-onset Alzheimer's disease with the support of his loving family (his wife is played by Chae Shi-ra). Yu said his character Choi Jang-soo was closest to his real-life personality. This was followed by a leading role in adultery drama Dear Lover (2007) with Yoon Son-ha, a remake of 1995 Japanese drama Koibito Yo.

In 2009, Yu and Song Seon-mi played a gangster and doctor who fall in love in the stage play Turn Around and Leave, which was previously dramatized onscreen in the 1998 film A Promise and the 2006 TV series Lovers. Later that year, he played a supporting role in Potato Symphony, about a man who moves back to his hometown with his daughter, and faces unresolved conflicts with his old high school friends (the protagonist is played by Jeon Yong-taek, who also wrote, directed and produced the film). Jeon and Yu are close friends in real life, and the film is set in their hometown Yeongwol County. Despite winning the Grand Prix at the 4th Festival Franco-Coréen du Film, Potato Symphony was little seen domestically.

After the underwhelming box office and TV ratings of past projects he'd headlined, Yu stuck to supporting roles. He starred opposite Kim Dong-wook in buddy comedy Happy Killers (2010), in which Kim played a slacker cop assigned to investigate a serial killer case, while Yu played an unemployed man with natural instincts as a detective who gets in the way by trying to catch the killer as well. Yu also appeared in action series Swallow the Sun (2009) which was filmed in Las Vegas, South Africa and Jeju Island, two horse-based human comedy films -- Lump Sugar (2006) starring Im Soo-jung and Champ (2011) starring Cha Tae-hyun, and the crime drama Don't Cry Mommy (2012).

More recently, he played villains in the 2010 historical drama Kim Su-ro, The Iron King, and the 2012 fantasy Faith in which he played a fictionalized version of Empress Gi's older brother.

In 2013, Yu reprised his most memorable role in the sequel Friend: The Great Legacy, in which he faces the grown-up son of the friend he'd given orders to be killed (Kim Woo-bin), interspersed with scenes of his own father's gangster past in Busan (Joo Jin-mo).

Yu made a return to the sageuk genre with the 2014 drama series Gunman in Joseon, in which he plays the main antagonist. His performance as Choi Won-sin, a villainous and powerful merchant and the archenemy of Lee Joon-gi's character, was widely praised and earned him a nomination for Best Supporting Actor at the 2014 KBS Drama Awards.

== Filmography ==
=== Film ===
Year	Title	Role
1991	Love, Love: Han Hee-jak's Love Stories	Dal-shik
1993	First Love	
1994	I Wish for What Is Forbidden to Me	Hwang Nam-gi
1995	Dr. Bong	On-dal
1995	Terrorist	Jeom-pyo
1995	Man?	Seong Chung-do
1996	Kill the Love	Baek Joon
1997	Poison	
1997	Beat	Tae-soo
1998	Saturday, 2:00 pm	Dal-soo
1998	Spring in My Hometown	Sung-min's uncle
1999	The Spy	Rhee Cheol-jin
1999	Attack the Gas Station	Mu Dae-po ("Bulldozer")
2001	Friend	Lee Joon-seok
2002	Champion	Kim Deuk-gu
2003	Star	Yeong-woo
2004	Thomas An Jung-geun	An Jung-geun
2006	Lump Sugar	Yun-jo
2009	Potato Symphony	Jin-han
2010	Happy Killers	Kim Young-seok
2011	Champ	Trainer Yoon
2012	Don't Cry Mommy	Detective
2013	Friend: The Great Legacy	Lee Joon-seok
2015	Shoot Me in the Heart	Choi Ki-hoon
2018	The Great Battle	Yeon Gaesomun
2021	Tomb of the River	Gil-seok

=== Television series ===
Year	Title	Role	Notes	Ref.
1998	Aim for Tomorrow	Kang Dae-ho		
2000	Some Like It Hot	Kang Man-ho		
2004	Jang Gil-san	Jang Gil-san		
2006	Invisible Man	Choi Jang-soo		
2007	Dear Lover	Go Dong-woo		
2009	Swallow the Sun	Jackson Lee		
2009	Invincible Lee Pyung Kang	Policeman	Cameo	
2010	Kim Su-ro, The Iron King	Shingwi Ghan / Tae-gang		
2012	KBS Drama Special: "Missing Case of National; Assembly Member Jung Chi-sung"	Jung Chi-sung		
2012	Faith	Ki-Chul		
2013	KBS Drama Special: "Mother's Island"	Lee-Tan		
2013	KBS Drama Special: "The Devil Rider"	Moon-Bok		
2014	Gunman in Joseon	Choi Won-shin		
2015	Spy	Hwang Ki-chul		
2015	The Merchant: Gaekju 2015	Gil So-gae		
2016	Uncontrollably Fond	Choi Hyeon-joon		
2018	Are You Human?	Seo Jong-gil		
2019	My Country: The New Age	Seo Geom	Cameo	
2021	The Veil	Baek Mo-sa		
2023	Welcome to Samdal-ri	Jo Sang-tae		
2023–2024	Sweet Home	Tak In-hwan	Season 2–3	

=== Variety show ===
Year	Title	Notes/Ref.
2009	Billion Won Mystery with Yu Oh-seong	Host
2021	Law of the Jungle – Pent Island: Island of Desire	Cast Member

=== Music video appearances ===
Year	Song title	Artist
2011	"Goodbye"	Seo Yoon
2013	"Baby I'm Sorry" (2013)	My Name

== Theater ==
Year	Title	Role
1992	Blood	
2005	Story of an Old Thief	
2005	Tape	Vince
2006	Oedipus	
2009	Turn Around and Leave	Gong Sang-du

== Awards and nominations ==
Year presented, name of the award ceremony, award category, nominated work and the result of the nomination
Year	Award	Category	Nominated work	Result
1994	32nd Grand Bell Awards	Best New Actor	I Wish for What Is Forbidden to Me	Nominated
1997	35th Grand Bell Awards	Best Supporting Actor	Beat	Nominated
1998	MBC Drama Awards	Best New Actor	Aim for Tomorrow	Won
1999	Korean Most Popular Entertainment Awards	Most Popular Actor		Won
2001	46th Asia Pacific Film Festival	Best Actor	Friend	Won
2001	9th Chunsa Film Art Awards	Best Actor	Friend	Won
2001	38th Grand Bell Awards	Best Actor	Friend	Nominated
2001	22nd Blue Dragon Film Awards	Best Actor	Friend	Nominated
2002	38th Baeksang Arts Awards	Best Actor (Film)	Friend	Nominated
2002	38th Baeksang Arts Awards	Most Popular Actor (Film)	Friend	Won
2002	1st Korean Film Awards	Best Actor	Champion	Nominated
2003	40th Grand Bell Awards	Best Actor	Champion	Nominated
2007	44th Grand Bell Awards	Best Supporting Actor	Lump Sugar	Nominated
2009	SBS Drama Awards	Best Supporting Actor in a Drama Special	Swallow the Sun	Nominated
2012	SBS Drama Awards	Excellence Award, Actor in a Miniseries	Faith	Nominated
2012	KBS Drama Awards	Best Actor in a One-act Drama	Missing Case of National Assembly; Member Jung Chi-sung	Nominated
2013	KBS Drama Awards	Best Actor in a One-act Drama	Mother's Island, The Devil Rider	Won
2014	KBS Drama Awards	Best Supporting Actor	Gunman in Joseon	Nominated
2015	KBS Drama Awards	Excellence Award, Actor in Mid-length Drama	The Merchant: Gaekju 2015	Nominated
2018	KBS Drama Awards	Best Supporting Actor	Are You Human?	Nominated
