= Champion (2002 film) =

- Film poster
- Hangul: 챔피언
- RR: Chaempieon
- MR: Ch'aemp'iŏn
- Directed by: Kwak Kyung-taek
- Written by: Kwak Kyung-taek
- Produced by: Jo Weon-jang
- Starring: Yu Oh-seong; Chae Min-seo
- Cinematography: Hong Kyung-pyo
- Edited by: Park Gok-ji
- Music by: Laurent Sauvagnac; Stéphane Zidi; Matthieu Gain
- Distributed by: Media Suits
- Release date: June 28, 2002
- Running time: 117 minutes
- Country: South Korea
- Language: Korean
- Box office: US$10.6 million

Champion (Korean: 챔피언) is a 2002 South Korean biographical sport drama film directed by Kwak Kyung-taek, about South Korean boxer Duk Koo Kim, portrayed by Yu Oh-seong.

== Background ==
A biopic, Champion details the life of Duk Koo Kim, South Korea's most popular boxer, who, in his rise to international fame, faced the reigning lightweight champion Ray Mancini at Caesars Palace in Las Vegas, Nevada on November 13, 1982. Kim ultimately lost the match after fourteen rounds, and within minutes, dropped into a coma from which he never recovered. The match changed boxing rules around the world; and affected South Korea especially.

== Cast ==
- Yu Oh-seong - Duk Koo Kim
- Chae Min-seo - Lee Kyeong-mi
- Yun Seung-won - Kim Hyeon-ji
- Jung Doo-hong - Lee Sang-bok
- Kim Byeong-seo - Park Jong-pal
- Ji Dae-han - Hwang Jun-seok
- Shin Jung-geun - Kim Yun-gu
- Kim Hyun-sook - Bus driver
- Han Dae-gwan
- Matthew Ray Phillips - Ray Mancini
- Hoss Mortezaie - Mancini's Cornerman

== Reception ==
In 2012, Christopher Tavlarides, who was the co-executive producer of The Good Son, a documentary film based on the Mark Kriegel biography The Good Son: The Life of Ray "Boom Boom" Mancini, noted Champion was fictionalized and made without consultation of Lee Young-mee or Ray Mancini. (Kim's son Chi-wan, born six months after the boxer's death, was still a minor at the time of Champion being produced, and participated in The Good Son where he told Kriegel he wanted to visit Mancini.)
