= Friend: The Great Legacy =

2013 South Korean film directed by Kwak Kyung-taek

- Film poster
- Hangul: 친구 2
- Hanja: 親舊 2
- RR: Chingu 2
- MR: Ch'in'gu 2
- Directed by: Kwak Kyung-taek
- Written by: Han Seung-woon; Kwak Kyung-taek
- Produced by: Nam Ji-woong; Yoo Ju-young; Yang Jung-gyeong
- Starring: Yu Oh-seong; Joo Jin-mo; Kim Woo-bin
- Cinematography: Yun Ju-hwan
- Edited by: Park Kwang-il
- Music by: Jeong Jin-ho
- Distributed by: Lotte Entertainment
- Release date: 14 November 2013
- Running time: 124 minutes
- Country: South Korea
- Language: Korean
- Box office: ₩21.8 million (US$20.1 million)

Friend: The Great Legacy (Korean: 친구 2; RR: Chingu 2; lit. 'Friend 2') is a 2013 South Korean neo-noir action film about three generations of gangsters, starring Yu Oh-seong, Joo Jin-mo, and Kim Woo-bin. It is the sequel to the 2001 box-office hit Friend, also directed by Kwak Kyung-taek. Friend: The Great Legacy was released in theaters on 14 November 2013.

== Plot ==
Friend: The Great Legacy begins 17 years after where the previous film left off. Lee Joon-seok, who claimed responsibility for ordering his friend Dong-soo's murder (despite having nothing to do with it), has spent a lot of time behind bars and now he is released to a world that is as unfamiliar to him as the criminal organization he used to lead. With his subordinate Eun-ki now practically parading as the boss, Joon-seok, a leader by nature, secretly embarks on a mission to subvert his current position. He invites Choi Sung-hoon, whom he'd met in prison, and Sung-hoon's gang to join in his plan. Sung-hoon is the twenty-something son of one of Joon-seok's female friends in high school who now works as a bar hostess, and he had been serving a one-year sentence for beating his mother's abusive husband. Having developed a respect for the charismatic Joon-seok in prison, Sung-hoon willingly takes his side. But when he discovers the truth behind his background, this creates great tension between the two. Interspersed are scenes of Joon-seok's own father, Lee Chul-joo as a gangster who founded the criminal organization in 1963 Busan.

The scene ends of flashback 17 years ago of Joon-Seok in a car after leaving Dong-Su behind, it shows Joon-Seok was remorsed of him not being able to protect his childhood friend.

== Cast ==
- Yoo Oh-sung as Lee Joon-suk
- Joo Jin-mo as Lee Chul-joo
- Kim Woo-bin as Choi Sung-hoon
- Jang Young-nam as Hye-ji, Sung-hoon's mother
- Jung Ho-bin as Eun-ki
- Gi Joo-bong as Hyung-doo
  - Ji Seung-hyun as young Hyung-doo
- Lee Chul-min as Wig
- Lee Jun-hyeok as Jjam-bo
- Sun Ho-jin as Song Ki-ho
- Jung Soo-gyo as Hae-young
- Bae Sung-jong as Yong-baek
- Kang Han-na as Ah-ram
- Ahn Jung-bin as Gook-do
- Go Geon-han as Kim-min
- Lee Sang-hoon as Choo Jeop-yi
- Won Woong-jae as Yoo shik-yi
- Song Ji-ho as Jae-chil
- Shin Joon-bum as Bulging head
- Park Sung-hyun as young Sang-gon
- Yoon Jin-ha as Bug-eye
- Choi Jung-hyun as Sang-min
- Jang Dong-gun as Dong-soo (cameo)

== Box office ==
Despite the "Restricted" rating it received from the Korea Media Rating Board, Friend: The Great Legacy opened strongly at the box office on 14 November 2013. It attracted 1.06 million admissions over its opening weekend, topping the local box office chart against competitors such as Hollywood blockbuster Thor: The Dark World and Korean film The Five. It went on to sell 2,969,874 tickets during its run, with total earnings of ₩21,795,038,513.

== Awards and nominations ==
| Year | Award | Category | Recipient | Result |
|---|---|---|---|---|
| 2014 | 9th Max Movie Awards | Best New Actor | Kim Woo-bin | Nominated |
| 2014 | 50th Baeksang Arts Awards | Best New Actor | Kim Woo-bin | Nominated |
| 2014 | 50th Baeksang Arts Awards | Most Popular Actor | Kim Woo-bin | Nominated |
| 2014 | 51st Grand Bell Awards | Popularity Award | Kim Woo-bin | Won |
| 2014 | 35th Blue Dragon Film Awards | Best New Actor | Kim Woo-bin | Nominated |
| 2014 | 35th Blue Dragon Film Awards | Popular Star Award | Kim Woo-bin | Won |
