= Jo Young-nam =

South Korean singer (born 1945)

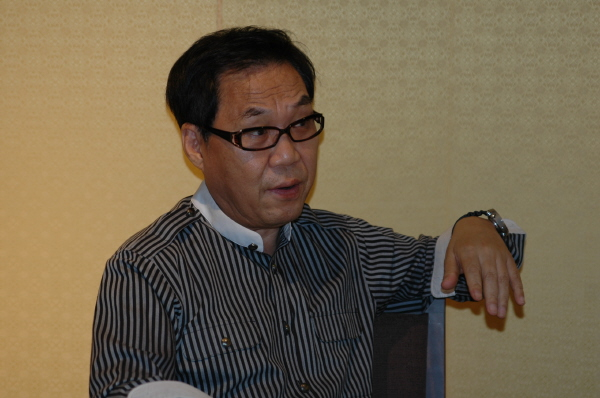
- Jo in 2008

Background information
- Also known as: Cho Youngnam
- Born: April 2, 1945 (age 81); Heizan, Kōkai-dō, Korea, Empire of Japan
- Occupations: Singer-songwriter, painter, writer
- Years active: 1968–present

Jo Young-nam (Korean: 조영남; Hanja: 趙英男; born April 2, 1945), also known as Cho Youngnam, is a South Korean singer-songwriter, painter, writer, and television personality.

== Career ==
=== Music ===
Jo's most popular songs include "Delilah", his first release in 1968, "My Home Chungchong Province" and "Hwagae Marketplace." His other notable recordings include "Swallow," "Barley Field," and "Farewell to the City". He has stated that the reason he feels he was not more successful was because he mainly did covers in the beginning of his career.

=== Painting ===
As a painter, in 2016, Jo was indicted on charges of having an unknown artist, whom Jo claimed as his assistant, paint 200 to 300 pieces between 2009 and 2016, after which Jo would add background touches and sell them, earning approximately 160 million won. The first trial court found Jo guilty and sentenced him to 10 months in prison, suspended for two years. However, both the appellate and Supreme Courts acquitted him.

== Personal life ==
Jo married actress Youn Yuh-jung in 1974, and divorced in 1987 following his repeated affairs. He later married Paek Eun-Sil before they divorced.

== Etymology ==
- Media related to Jo Young-nam at Wikimedia Commons
