= Tan Teng Kee =

Singaporean boxer

Personal information
- Nickname: Battling Key
- Born: Singapore
- Died: 20 March 1935
- Weight: Lightweight

Boxing career

Boxing record
- Total fights: 61
- Wins: 30
- Win by KO: 17
- Losses: 27
- Draws: 4
- No contests: 0

Tan Teng Kee or Battling Key was a professional boxer from Singapore and former two time Malayan Lightweight Champion.

== Professional career ==
Tan Teng Kee debuted in 1922, winning the Malayan Lightweight Championship in his eighth fight. He lost to fellow veteran boxer Young Pelky (Lope Tenorio) in 1923 in front of an audience of 6000 people, earning the respect of ringside observers. He would go on to lose his title to Eddie Grady in 1924, regaining it later in 1925 against Vincent Pereira.

On 20 March 1935 he died due to injuries suffered in his fight with Jimmy Nelson. This was ruled as an accidental death and was reported as one of the first boxing fatalities outside Singapore by The Straits Times. His funeral took place at the Roman Catholic cemetery and was attended by numerous amateur boxers.

His final record was 30 wins, 27 defeats and 4 draws.

== See also ==
- Kim Duk-koo

Vacant Title last held by Unknown	Malayan Lightweight Champion; 18 January 1923 - 3 October 1924	Succeeded by Eddie Grady
Vacant Title last held by Eddie Grady	Malayan Lightweight Champion; 2 October 1925 - ?	Incumbent
