= It Was Love (TV series) =

2012–2013 South Korean television series

- Promotional poster
- Also known as: Maybe Love
- Hangul: 사랑했나봐
- RR: Saranghaenna bwa
- MR: Saranghaenna pwa
- Genre: Melodrama; Romance
- Written by: Kim Jung-soo
- Directed by: Kim Heung Dong; Lee Gye-joon
- Starring: Park Si-eun; Ahn Jae-mo; Kim Bo-kyung; Hwang Dong-joo
- Music by: Kang Ho-yeon; Lee Kwang-hee
- Country of origin: South Korea
- Original language: Korean
- No. of episodes: 144

Production
- Running time: 40 minutes

Original release
- Network: MBC
- Release: October 15, 2012 – May 3, 2013

It Was Love (Korean: 사랑했나봐) is a 2012 South Korean television series starring Park Si-eun, Ahn Jae-mo, Kim Bo-kyung and Hwang Dong-joo. It aired on MBC from October 15, 2012, to May 3, 2013, on Monday to Friday for 144 episodes.

== Synopsis ==
A woman whose best friend steals her husband and utterly destroys her life. A frenemy who wrecks a woman's life and does all this for the sake of her daughter. How will justice prevail in their lives?

== Cast ==
=== Main ===
- Park Si-eun as Han Yoon-jin
  - Lee Ji-eun as child Yoon-jin
- Ahn Jae-mo as Baek Jae-hyun
- Kim Bo-kyung as Choi Sun-jung
  - Hyun Seung-min as child Sun-jung
- Hwang Dong-joo as Joo Hyun-do

=== Yoon-jin's family ===
- Lee Hyo-choon as Jin Ae Young
- Lee Jae-woo as Han Kyu Jin

=== Hyun-do's family ===
- Kim Dong-hyun as Joo Myung Chul
- Park Jung-soo as Ahn Soo Mi
- Jin Ye-sol as Joo Kyung Eun
- Kim Na-hee as Joo Ye Na

=== Jae-hun's family ===
- Kim Young-ran as Kim Myung Ja
- Choi Ji-won as Baek Jang Mi

=== Others ===
- Lee Hye-eun as Lee Ji Sook
- Park Dong-bin as Park Do Joon
- Choi In-sook as Jung Eun Soon
- Choi Min as Manager Park
- Lee Mi-do as Kim Mi Jin
- Won Jong-rye

=== Cameos and special appearances ===
- Lee Joo-hyun
- Kim Seung-hoon
