= Kim Yool-ho =

South Korean actor and model (born 1985)

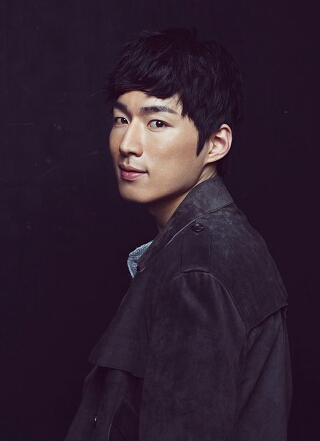
- Kim in 2013
- Born: February 21, 1985 (age 41); Cheongju, South Korea
- Occupations: Actor; model
- Years active: 2012–present
- Agent: Hwow Entertainment
- Height: 181 cm (5 ft 11 in)

Korean name
- Hangul: 김율호
- RR: Gim Yulho
- MR: Kim Yurho

Kim Yool-ho (Korean: 김율호; born February 21, 1985) is a South Korean actor and model, He is best known for his role in The Map Against the World, in which he played Prince Geumwi, and the 2016 zombie thriller apocalypse film Train to Busan in a cameo role in which he helps Yong-suk (played by Kim Eui-sung).

== Filmography ==
=== Films ===
- The Map Against the World as Prince Geumwi (2016)
- Train to Busan as Man in suit 2 (infected) (2016)
- Northern Limit Line as 357 guard (2015)
- The Firefighters as Team member 1 (2024)
- Boy in the Pool as Han coach and Sports reporter (2025)

=== Dramas ===
- Uncle Samsik (2024)
- Rookie Cops as Chu Yi-sa (2022)
- Apgujeong Midnight Sun as Assistant Manager Sung (2015)
- A Witch's Love as Dong Ha's senior (cameo) (2014)
- Hotel King as new employee (2014)
- Shining Romance as hit and run man (2013-2014)
- Tasty Life as doctor (2012)
