= Canola (film) =

- Theatrical release poster
- Directed by: Chang
- Written by: Yang Seo-hyun; Chang; Heo Ah-reum
- Produced by: Choi Hyun-mook; Im Geon-jung; Kim Jung-go
- Starring: Youn Yuh-jung; Kim Go-eun
- Cinematography: Park Jang-hyuk
- Edited by: Kim Chang-ju; Park Gyeong-suk
- Music by: Kim Jun-seong; Kim Ji-ae
- Production company: Zio Entertainment Inc.
- Distributed by: Culture Nandakinda; Mirovision Inc.
- Release date: May 19, 2016
- Running time: 116 minutes
- Country: South Korea
- Languages: Korean; Jeju language
- Box office: US$3.1 million

Canola (Jeju: 계춘할망, RR: Gyechun Halmang, lit. "Grandmother Gye-choon") is a 2016 South Korean drama film co-written and directed by Chang, starring Youn Yuh-jung and Kim Go-eun. It was released theatrically on May 19, 2016.

== Plot ==
Haenyeo Gye-chun miraculously reunites with her granddaughter Hye-ji, who had been lost for 12 years. They begin living together again in Gye-chun's house in Jeju, trying to adapt to each other as they rebuild their bond.

But while Gye-chun is completely focused on her granddaughter from morning till night, grown-up Hye-ji remains a mystery, revealing little about herself. Suspicion begins to grow among the villagers about Hye-ji, who seems to be hiding something. Then one day, Hye-ji vanishes after traveling to Seoul for an art competition.

== Cast ==
- Youn Yuh-jung as Gye-choon
- Kim Go-eun as Hye-ji
  - Lee Seul-bi as young Hye-ji
- Kim Hee-won as Suk-ho
- Shin Eun-jung as Myeong-ok
- Yang Ik-june as Choong-seop
- Choi Min-ho as Han-yi
- Ryu Jun-yeol as Cheol-heon
- Park Min-ji as Min-hee
- Nam Tae-boo as Choong-hee
- Oh Hee-joon as Gye-choon's house member
- Jang Hyuk-jin as Real Estate Agent Byun
- Park Jung-chul as Attorney Seo
- Choi Moon-kyoung as green umbrella 1
- Kim Dae-myung as Fitness trainer

== Remake ==
The copyrights have been sold for an upcoming Chinese remake of the film.

== Awards and nominations ==
| Year | Award | Category | Recipient | Result |
|---|---|---|---|---|
| 2016 | 53rd Grand Bell Awards | Best Actress | Youn Yuh-jung | Nominated |
| 2016 | 53rd Grand Bell Awards | Best New Actor | Choi Min-ho | Nominated |
| 2016 | 53rd Grand Bell Awards | Best New Actress | Lee Seul-bi | Nominated |
