= List of 2013 box office number-one films in South Korea =

This is a list of films which placed number-one at the South Korean box office during 2013.

== Number-one films ==
†	This implies the highest-grossing movie of the year.

#	Date	Film	Gross
1	January 6, 2013	The Tower	$5,678,611
2	January 13, 2013	God's Men	$5,594,219
3	January 20, 2013	God's Men	$6,151,191
4	January 27, 2013	Miracle in Cell No. 7 †	$8,685,040
5	February 3, 2013	The Berlin File	$10,823,513
6	February 10, 2013	Miracle in Cell No. 7 †	$10,823,513
7	February 17, 2013	Miracle in Cell No. 7 †	$7,502,660
8	February 24, 2013	New World	$6,072,930
9	March 3, 2013	New World	$6,035,404
10	March 10, 2013	New World	$3,624,540
11	March 17, 2013	Warm Bodies	$2,886,705
12	March 24, 2013	Very Ordinary Couple	$3,837,249
13	March 31, 2013	G.I. Joe: Retaliation	$5,295,089
14	April 7, 2013	Running Man	$3,317,529
15	April 14, 2013	Oblivion	$3,613,235
16	April 21, 2013	Oblivion	$2,513,552
17	April 28, 2013	Iron Man 3	$16,498,150
18	May 5, 2013	Iron Man 3	$13,585,664
19	May 12, 2013	Iron Man 3	$7,461,129
20	May 19, 2013	Iron Man 3	$4,783,002
21	May 26, 2013	Fast & Furious 6	$4,256,318
22	June 2, 2013	Star Trek Into Darkness	$3,759,686
23	June 9, 2013	Secretly, Greatly	$13,197,859
24	June 16, 2013	Man of Steel	$7,335,782
25	June 23, 2013	World War Z	$8,683,814
26	June 30, 2013	World War Z	$6,292,950
27	July 7, 2013	Cold Eyes	$8,818,107
28	July 14, 2013	Pacific Rim	$8,349,956
29	July 21, 2013	Red 2	$5,467,014
30	July 28, 2013	Red 2	$4,459,610
31	August 4, 2013	Snowpiercer	$14,842,419
32	August 11, 2013	Snowpiercer	$10,605,489
33	August 18, 2013	Hide and Seek	$8,735,956
34	August 25, 2013	Hide and Seek	$6,969,108
35	September 1, 2013	Elysium	$3,985,430
36	September 8, 2013	The Spy: Undercover Operation	$5,599,105
37	September 15, 2013	The Face Reader	$12,738,665
38	September 22, 2013	The Face Reader	$15,280,816
39	September 29, 2013	The Face Reader	$4,408,474
40	October 6, 2013	Hope	$3,191,820
41	October 13, 2013	Hwayi: A Monster Boy	$5,130,236
42	October 20, 2013	Gravity	$6,296,993
43	October 27, 2013	Gravity	$5,292,865
44	November 3, 2013	Thor: The Dark World	$6,114,417
45	November 10, 2013	Thor: The Dark World	$4,770,468
46	November 17, 2013	Friend: The Great Legacy	$7,668,783
47	November 24, 2013	Friend: The Great Legacy	$3,386,314
48	December 1, 2013	11 A.M.	$2,590,802
49	December 8, 2013	About Time	$3,421,040
50	December 15, 2013	The Hobbit: The Desolation of Smaug	$6,236,288
51	December 22, 2013	The Attorney	$9,594,605
52	December 29, 2013	The Attorney	$10,509,641

== Highest-grossing films ==
Highest-grossing films of 2013 (by admissions)
Rank	Title	Country	Admissions	Domestic gross
1.	Miracle in Cell No. 7	South Korea	12,810,776	US$80.1 million
2.	Snowpiercer	South Korea	9,341,747	US$58.7 million
3.	The Face Reader	South Korea	9,134,463	US$57.8 million
4.	Iron Man 3	United States	9,001,309	US$62 million
5.	The Berlin File	South Korea	7,166,268	US$45.8 million
6.	Secretly, Greatly	South Korea	6,959,083	US$42.7 million
7.	The Attorney	South Korea	5,686,892	US$49.4 million
8.	Hide and Seek	South Korea	5,604,104	US$34.7 million
9.	The Terror Live	South Korea	5,579,675	US$34.9 million
10.	Cold Eyes	South Korea	5,506,770	US$34.5 million

Highest-grossing domestic films of 2013 (by admissions)
Rank	Title	Admissions	Domestic gross
1.	Miracle in Cell No. 7	12,810,776	US$80.1 million
2.	Snowpiercer	9,341,747	US$58.7 million
3.	The Face Reader	9,134,463	US$57.8 million
4.	The Berlin File	7,166,268	US$45.8 million
5.	Secretly, Greatly	6,959,083	US$42.7 million
6.	The Attorney	5,686,892	US$49.4 million
7.	Hide and Seek	5,604,104	US$34.7 million
8.	The Terror Live	5,579,675	US$34.9 million
9.	Cold Eyes	5,506,770	US$34.5 million
10.	New World	4,682,418	US$30.6 million
