= The Taste of Money =

- Korean release poster
- Hangul: 돈의 맛
- RR: Donui mat
- MR: Tonŭi mat
- Directed by: Im Sang-soo
- Written by: Im Sang-soo
- Produced by: Jill Anoba-Yap
- Starring: Kim Kang-woo; Youn Yuh-jung; Kim Hyo-jin; Baek Yoon-sik; On Joo-wan; Maui Taylor
- Cinematography: Kim Woo-hyung
- Edited by: Lee Eun-soo
- Music by: Kim Hong-jib
- Production companies: Lotte Entertainment; Cinergy; Wild Side Films
- Distributed by: IFC Films; Sundance Selects (US)
- Release date: 17 May 2012
- Running time: 115 minutes
- Country: South Korea
- Languages: Korean; English; Tagalog
- Box office: $7,539,438

The Taste of Money (Korean: 돈의 맛; RR: Donui mat) is a 2012 South Korean erotic thriller film about a conglomerate-owning family.

The film generated controversy and public interest through its depiction of the privileged class in South Korean society. It explores themes of sexuality, wealth, greed, and ambition, offering a critical portrayal of the lives of the wealthy and influential. The film is directed by Im Sang-soo and is his seventh feature film.

== Plot ==
In a luxurious house outside Seoul lives one of the country's richest families: company president Yoon, his wife Baek Geum-ok, their divorced daughter Nami, and son Chul. Yoon is company president but the reins of power are held by his wife Geum-ok, whose aged father was once a powerful businessman, and whom Yoon married for her money and influence. Yoon's private secretary is Joo Young-jak, from humble origins. His current job is making sure a U.S. businessman, Robert Altman, is kept happy with hookers, as part of a major business deal that could prove crucial to the family's fortunes. When Geum-ok sees Yoon having an affair with their Filipina maid, Eva, on her hidden CCTV, she beds Young-jak in revenge. When Chul is arrested for organizing a slush fund for Altman, Geum-ok decides to further punish her husband for his "mistake" in bringing the family's name into public disrepute, by having Eva killed. At the same time, Nami and Young-jak, start an affair. Yoon commits suicide over Eva's death (and takes the blame for his son's activities). After his funeral, Young-jak quits the family, glad to be rid of their influences. He accompanies Eva's coffin to the Philippines, where he is joined on the plane by Nami.

== Cast ==
- Kim Kang-woo as Joo Young-jak
- Youn Yuh-jung as Baek Geum-ok
- Baek Yoon-sik as Chairman Yoon
- Kim Hyo-jin as Yoon Nami
- On Joo-wan s Yoon Chul/Charlie
- Maui Taylor as Eva
- Kwon Byung-gil as Noh, Geum-ok's father
- Hwang Jung-min as Noh's assistant
- Darcy Paquet as Robert Altman
- Kal So-won as Ri-ni

== Themes ==
The Taste of Money first and foremost explores the corrupting influence of money. It is the spiritual sequel of Im's previous film, he calls it "an extension of The Housemaid. You can say that it's the story of the children of The Housemaid who've grown up." It is his exploration of the world outside the household portrayed in that movie – "What Hoon does outside the home, what kind of parents he has, an expansion of the scope of The Housemaid."

At the end of The Housemaid, a young girl Nami is in shock at witnessing the suicide of her nanny Eun-yi. Fully grown up as a divorcée with a child of her own, Nami is now a main character in this film. She is the only member of the family with a moral sense.

If The Housemaid asserted through a self-immolating woman the impossibility of overturning the classes, The Taste of Money asks the question of whether a beautiful and happy life really might be impossible in a dark society. The conclusion seems to be that money makes it impossible live a happy life, and makes one troubled and abusive even to those nearest.

== Production ==
At 64, Youn Yuh-jung appears in her first on-camera sex scene, a quite unexpected requirement for the actress. "I didn't know there was such a scene when I began," Yoon said. "After I found out, I was really surprised and asked the director, 'Don't you think the audience would be offended to see an old woman naked on screen?'" "The director answered, 'I wrote in the scene intending on that very thing.'"

== Release ==
=== Cannes ===
The film was invited to screen in competition at the 2012 Cannes Film Festival, where it received the lowest mark out of the 22 works vying for the Palme d'Or according to Screen International, which aggregates reviews of the most respected critics worldwide. Before and after the closing ceremony, director Im Sang-soo said to various Korean media that his failure to win was a personal "tragedy" and his participation a mistake because he was telling a "very Korean story" that foreigners can't understand.

=== Critical reception ===
When released in the United States, The Taste of Money received mixed to negative reviews; it currently holds a 32% "rotten" rating on Rotten Tomatoes. Metacritic the film has a 54/100 rating, indicating "mixed or average reviews".

A positive review comes from A.O. Scott of The New York Times, who blurbs: "Even as The Taste of Money swerves toward a frantic climax and a sentimental denouement, it remains intriguing. It feeds an insatiable curiosity about how the other half – or, in current parlance, the 1 percent – lives, and what it shows us is gorgeous, grotesque and disconcertingly human."

=== Box office ===
Since its theatrical release on 17 May 2012, the film has grossed over 7.9 billion Korean won (around 6.8 million U.S. dollars), occupying 33% of the domestic box office sales as of 29 May, according to the Korea Box Office Information System (KOBIS). Fifteen foreign distributors have also bought its distribution rights at the film market during the 2012 Cannes Film Festival, among them IFC Midnight, which acquired the film's North American rights.

== Awards and nominations ==
2012 Buil Film Awards

- Best Music – Kim Hong-jib
- Nomination – Best Supporting Actress – Kim Hyo-jin
- Nomination – Best Supporting Actress – Youn Yuh-jung
- Nomination – Best Cinematography – Kim Woo-hyung
- Nomination – Best Art Direction – Kim Yeong-hee, Kim Joon

== See also ==
- Cinema of South Korea
