= Kim Bo-kyung (actress) =

South Korean actress (1976–2021)

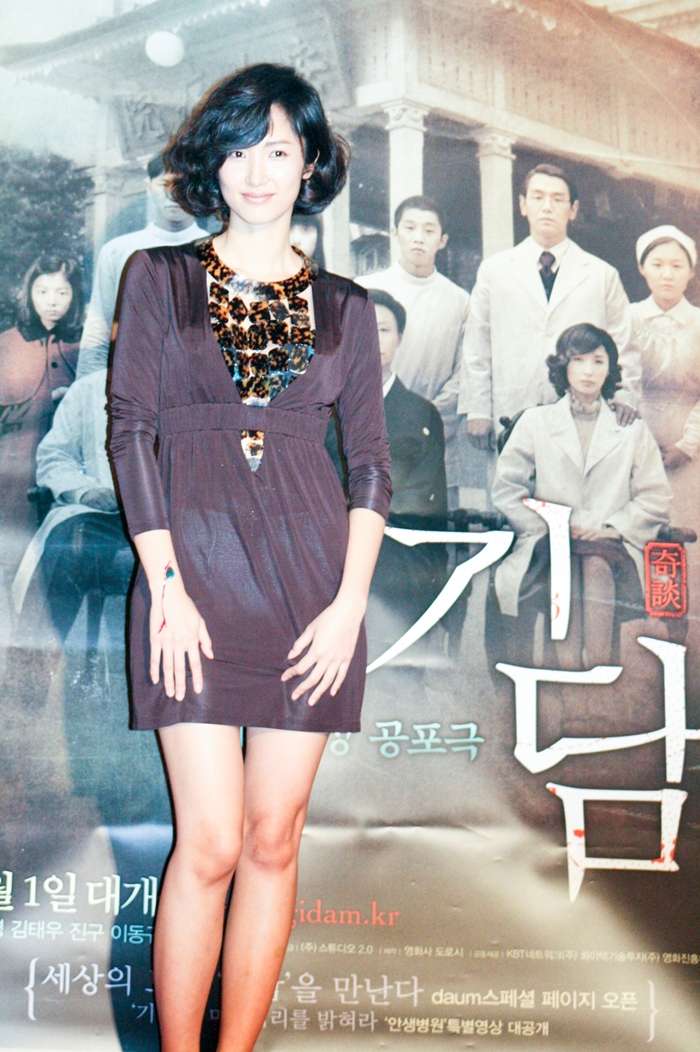
- Kim in 2007
- Born: April 3, 1976; Busan, South Korea
- Died: February 2, 2021 (aged 44); Busan, South Korea
- Resting place: Busan Memorial Park
- Education: Seoul Institute of the Arts - Theater
- Occupation: Actress
- Years active: 1995–2021
- Agent: Koom Entertainment
- Spouse: (m. 2012)

Korean name
- Hangul: 김보경
- RR: Gim Bogyeong
- MR: Kim Pogyŏng

Kim Bo-kyung (Korean: 김보경; 3 April 1976 – 2 February 2021) was a South Korean actress. She made her acting debut in 1995, and appeared in both television and film, notably Friend (2001), Epitaph (2007), Paju (2009) and The Day He Arrives (2011).

Kim died on 2 February 2021, after having liver cancer for 11 years. She was buried on 5 February in Busan Memorial Park.

== Filmography ==
=== Film ===
Year	Title	Role	Notes
1998	Naked Being	Yu-ri	
2001	Friend	Jin-sook	
2002	R. U. Ready?	Dan Joo-hee	
2003	Sword in the Moon	Kim Shi-young	
2003	Wonderful Day		short film
2004	My Little Bride	Ji-soo	
2006	Blue Sky	Lee Chung-ah	
2007	Before the Summer Passes Away	So-yeon	
2007	Epitaph	Kim In-young	
2007	Milky Way Liberation Front	Eun-kyeong	
2009	Paju	Jung Ja-young	
2009	After the Banquet	Han Seong-joo	
2011	The Day He Arrives	Kyung-jin/Ye-jeon	
2012	Horror Stories	Seon-yi's mother (voice cameo)	segment: "Don't Answer to the Door"
2014	A Hard Day	Ex-wife	

=== Television series ===
Year	Title	Role	Network
1995	New Generation Report: Adults Don't Know		KBS1
1999	Invitation		KBS2
2000	Drama City: "Double Feature"		KBS2
2001	School 4	Kim Yu-ri	KBS2
2003	MBC Best Theater: "Flower"	Noh Yoo-kyung	MBC
2003	Span Drama: "Our Happy Days of Youth"		MBC
2004	MBC Best Theater: "Commuter Train Love"	In-ae	MBC
2004	Drama City: "Dr. Love"	Dr. Love	KBS2
2005	Drama City: "Mother's Song"	Kim Ji-ah	KBS2
2005	Drama City: "Second First Love"	In-joo	KBS2
2005	Pocket Drama Warrior	Gyu-yeon	DMB
2006	MBC Best Theater: "Take Care, Youth"	Bo-ri	MBC
2007	Behind the White Tower	Kang Hee-jae	MBC
2007	Kimcheed Radish Cubes	Seo Ji-hye	MBC
2007	One Thousand and One Nights	Tara	OCN
2008	Spotlight	Lee Joo-hee	MBC
2010	KBS Drama Special: "After the Opera"	Choon-hee	KBS2
2012	KBS Drama Special: "Amore Mio"	Han Soo-young	KBS2
2012	It Was Love	Choi Seon-jeong	MBC

== Awards and nominations ==
Year presented, name of the award ceremony, award category, nominated work and the result of the nomination
Year	Award	Category	Nominated work	Result
2001	22nd Blue Dragon Film Awards	Best New Actress	Friend	Nominated
2007	3rd Pierson Film Festival	Best Actress	Epitaph	Won
2012	21st Buil Film Awards	Best Supporting Actress	The Day He Arrives	Nominated
