= RV: Resurrected Victims =

- Theatrical release poster
- Hangul: 희생부활자
- Hanja: 犧牲復活者
- RR: Huisaengbuhwalja
- MR: Hŭisaengbuhwalja
- Directed by: Kwak Kyung-taek
- Screenplay by: Kwak Kyung-taek
- Based on: It is Over by Park Ha-ik
- Produced by: Han Woo-yong; Yeon Young-sik
- Starring: Kim Rae-won; Kim Hae-sook
- Cinematography: Kim Sung-hwan
- Edited by: Kim Chang-ju
- Music by: Jeong Jin-ho
- Production companies: New World; Barunson E&A Corp
- Distributed by: Showbox
- Release date: October 12, 2017
- Running time: 91 minutes
- Country: South Korea
- Language: Korean
- Box office: US$2.1 million

RV: Resurrected Victims (Korean: 희생부활자) is a 2017 South Korean mystery thriller film directed by Kwak Kyung-taek. It is based on Park Ha-ik's 2012 novel It is Over. The film stars Kim Rae-won and Kim Hae-sook.

== Plot ==
Jin-hong is a prosecutor who is bent on tracking down the culprit who killed his mother 7 years ago. One day, Jin-hong's deceased mother comes to life again and appears before him, however she is set on attacking him. At the same time, unexplainable cases called RVP (Resurrected Victims Phenomenon) are reported throughout the world where victims of unsolved murders return to life to punish their killers. Based on this, secret agents investigating the cases conclude Jin-hong is the prime suspect of his mother's murder.

== Cast ==
- Kim Rae-won as Seo Jin-hong
- Kim Hae-sook as Choi Myung-sook
- Sung Dong-il as Son Young-tae
- Jang Young-nam as Seo Hee-jung
- Jeon Hye-jin as Lee Soo-hyun
- Lee Ji-won as Myeong Eun-ji
- Baek Bong-ki as Min-wook
- Jang Myeong-gap as Executive of police
- Gwak In-jun as General manager
- Hyun Bong-sik as Myeong Hyeon-cheol
- Jung Se-hyung
