= Be a Wicked Woman =

- VHS cover
- Hangul: 죽어도 좋은 경험: 천사여 악녀가 되라
- Hanja: 죽어도 좋은 經驗: 天使여 惡女가 되라
- RR: Jugeodo joeun gyeongheom: cheonsayeo angnyeoga doera
- MR: Chugŏdo choŭn kyŏnghŏm: ch'ŏnsayŏ angnyŏga toera
- Directed by: Kim Ki-young
- Written by: Kim Ki-young
- Produced by: Kim Yu-bong
- Starring: Youn Yuh-jung; Hyun Kill-soo; Lee Tam-mi; Kim Byeong-hak
- Cinematography: Ham Nam-sub
- Edited by: Hyeon Dong-chun
- Music by: Han Sang-ki
- Distributed by: Yuseong Film
- Release dates: 1998 (Busan International Film Festival); July 15, 2021 (South Korea)
- Running time: 98 minutes
- Country: South Korea
- Language: Korean

An Experience to Die For: Be a Wicked Woman (Korean: 죽어도 좋은 경험: 천사여 악녀가 되라), also known as Angel, Become an Evil Woman, is a 1990 South Korean film that premiered in 2021. It was directed by Kim Ki-young.

== Synopsis ==
Two women with unfaithful husbands make a deal to kill each other's husbands.

== Release ==
Produced in 1990, Kim was so disappointed with the outcome that he chose not to release it. The film was submitted to the censors twice — once in 1990 and again in 1995, under the new title 죽어도 좋은 경혐 (Jukeodo joeun gyeonghuom) — but was not screened for the public until the 1998 Busan International Film Festival, following Kim's untimely death in a house fire.

== Cast ==
- Youn Yuh-jung as Choi Yuh-jung
- Hyun Kill-soo as Jeong Dong-sik
- Lee Tam-mi as Lee Myoung-ja
- Kim Byeong-hak as Kim Woon-seok

== See also ==
- Throw Momma from the Train, a comedy with a similar premise.
