= The Firefighters (2024 film) =

2024 South Korean film by Kwak Kyung-taek

- Theatrical release poster
- Hangul: 소방관
- Hanja: 消防官
- Lit.: Firefighters
- RR: Sobanggwan
- MR: Sobanggwan
- Directed by: Kwak Kyung-taek
- Written by: Kwak Kyung-taek
- Produced by: Jeong Seung-pil; Han Seung-il; Go Seok-ho; Lee Seong-chan; Nam Ji-woong
- Starring: Joo Won; Kwak Do-won; Yoo Jae-myung; Lee Yoo-young; Kim Min-jae; Oh Dae-hwan; Lee Joon-hyuk; Jang Young-nam
- Cinematography: Lee Yong-gap
- Edited by: Jeong Ji-eun
- Music by: Mok Yeong-jin
- Production companies: Escroad Pictures; Ascendio; Osine Films
- Distributed by: By4M Studio
- Release date: December 4, 2024
- Running time: 106 minutes
- Country: South Korea
- Language: Korean
- Box office: US$25.1 million

The Firefighters (Korean: 소방관) is a 2024 South Korean drama film written and directed by Kwak Kyung-taek. Based on the Hongje-dong arson incident, it stars Joo Won, Kwak Do-won, Yoo Jae-myung, Lee Yoo-young, Kim Min-jae, Oh Dae-hwan, and Lee Joon-hyuk as a team of firefighters responding to the crisis. The film was released theatrically on December 4, 2024.

== Plot ==
To save lives and survive, a team of firefighters faces each day as if it were their last mission. Despite the harsh conditions, they unite with a single goal to extinguish fires and rescue everyone. One day, an urgent 119 emergency call reports a fire in Hongje-dong, and the team senses the gravity of the crisis as they prepare to respond.

== Cast ==
- Joo Won as Choi Cheol-woong
- Kwak Do-won as Jeong Jin-seop
- Yoo Jae-myung as Kang In-ki
- Lee Yoo-young as Seo-hee
- Kim Min-jae as Shin Yong-tae
- Oh Dae-hwan as Ahn Hyo-jong
- Lee Joon-hyuk as Song Ki-cheol
- Jang Young-nam as Do-sun
- Seo Min-ju as Ahn Hyo-min
- Kim Yool-ho as Team member 1
- Heo Jin as Sun-ja
- Hong Sang-pyo as Seo Kyung-ho
- Yoo Seong-ju as Team Leader
- Lee Yong-yi as Shin Yong-tae's mother

== Production ==
=== Filming ===
Principal photography started in May 2020 and concluded in September 2020. The film's release was delayed due to the COVID-19 pandemic and Kwak Do-won's drunk driving controversy.

=== Release ===
The film has initiated a charitable campaign where ₩119 will be donated for each paid ticket. This donation supports the construction of the National Fire Hospital, scheduled to open in 2025. Additionally, surpassing the break-even point will lead to further in-kind contributions from the production company.

== Reception ==
=== Box office ===
As of December 8, 2024, Firefighters has grossed $4,872,346 with a running total of 744,196 tickets sold.

=== Accolades ===
Award ceremony	Year	Category	Recipient(s)	Result	Ref.
Buil Film Awards	2025	Best Art/Technical Award	Hong Jang-pyo	Nominated	
Korean Film Producers Association Awards	2025	Best Director	Kwak Kyung-taek	Won	
Korean Film Producers Association Awards	2025	Best Editing	Jeong Ji-eun	Won	
