= Youn Yuh-jung =

South Korean actress (born 1947)

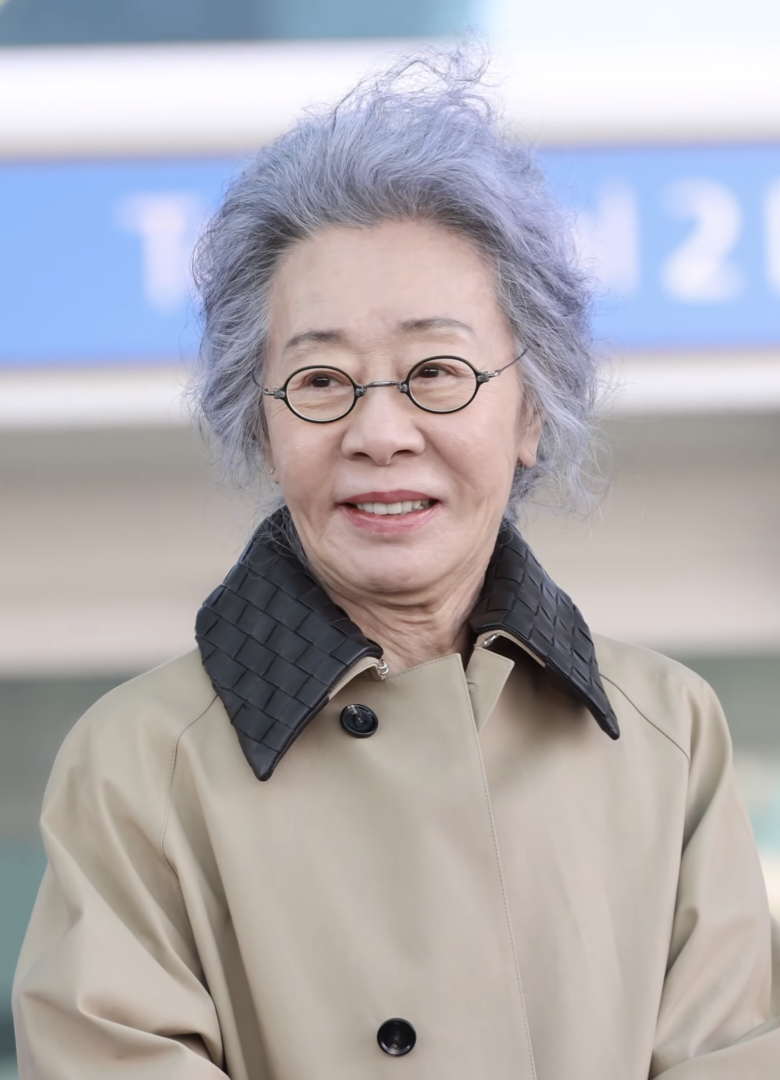
- Youn in February 2026
- Born: June 19, 1947 (age 79); Kaesong, Gyeonggi Province, southern Korea (now Kaesong, North Korea)
- Other name: Yoon Yeo-jeong
- Education: Ewha Girls' High School; Hanyang University
- Occupation: Actress
- Years active: 1966–present
- Agent: Creative Artists Agency (USA)
- Spouse: Jo Young-nam (m. 1974; div. 1987)
- Children: 2
- Awards: Best Supporting Actress at the 93rd Academy Awards
- Honours: Geumgwan Order of Cultural Merit (2021)

Korean name
- Hangul: 윤여정
- Hanja: 尹汝貞
- RR: Yun Yeojeong
- MR: Yun Yŏjŏng

Youn Yuh-jung (Korean: 윤여정; pronounced [jun jʌdʑʌŋ]; born June 19, 1947) is a South Korean actress. She started her career in Korean television in the late 1960s and rose to prominence with the film Woman of Fire (1971). She retired in the mid-1970s and immigrated to the United States before returning to Korea in 1984 and rebuilding her career. Known as the "Godmother of Chungmu-ro", Youn appeared in The Housemaid (2010), The Taste of Money (2012), The Bacchus Lady (2016), and Canola (2016).

On television, Youn is known for her matriarch roles in dramas such as Men of the Bath House (1995), Be Strong, Geum-soon! (2005), Daughters-in-Law (2007), My Husband Got a Family (2012), and Dear My Friends (2016), as well as the reality programmes Sisters Over Flowers (2013), Youn's Kitchen (2017–2018), and Unexpected Journey (2022).

Youn gained international acclaim for her role in Minari (2020), becoming the first Korean actress to win the Academy Award for Best Supporting Actress as well as numerous other awards. (Note: She also received the Screen Actors Guild Award, an Independent Spirit Award and a British Academy Film Award, all for Best Supporting Actress) She subsequently appeared in international productions, such as the Apple TV+ series Pachinko (2022–2024), the American film The Wedding Banquet (2025), and the Netflix series Beef (2026), the last of which earned her a nomination for the Primetime Emmy Award for Outstanding Supporting Actress in a Limited or Anthology Series or Movie.

== Early life ==
Youn graduated from high school in 1966. She then enrolled at Hanyang University and majored in Korean language and literature. When she passed open acting auditions held by TBC in 1966, she dropped out of college.

== Career ==
After dropping out of college, Youn made her acting debut in the television drama Mister Gom in 1967. She shot to stardom in 1971 with two memorable portrayals of femmes fatales. Her first film, Kim Ki-young's Woman of Fire, was a critical and commercial hit, for which she won Best Actress at the Sitges Film Festival. This was followed by the MBC historical drama Jang Hui-bin, in which she plays the eponymous royal concubine. Kim was considered Korea's first style-conscious, experimental director, and Youn did not balk at playing risqué, provocative characters that explore the grotesque in the female psyche in collaborations with him, such as The Insect Woman (1972) and Be a Wicked Woman (1990). Audiences found Youn's fast way of speaking and atypical appearance refreshing and she frequently took roles in TV dramas depicting a modern woman of the new generation, notably in Kim Soo-hyun's Stepmother (1972).

At the peak of her career, Youn married singer Jo Young-nam and retired from acting to immigrate to the United States. The couple lived in St. Petersburg, Florida, for ten years until their marriage broke down due to Jo's extramarital affairs. Youn returned to Korea in 1984 and divorced Jo in 1987.

Youn struggled to resume her acting career because of the stigma attached to being a middle-aged divorcée in South Korea. Unlike many actresses of her generation, who were confined to typical maternal or ajumma roles, Youn’s versatility enabled her to push the envelope. In A Good Lawyer's Wife (2003), she drew critical acclaim for her nonchalant portrayal of a woman who neglects her husband who is dying of liver cancer and enjoys extramarital affairs. Her frank and confident persona again manifested in E J-yong's mockumentary Actresses (2009).

Youn reunited with director Im Sang-soo for the fourth time in The Taste of Money (2012), as a cruel chaebol heiress at the center of the drama that unfolds and touches upon themes of corruption, greed, and sex. Youn said, "I don't mind being called an old actress, but I do worry about how to carry on my acting career without looking like an old fool."

In 2013, she was cast as a loving mother to three loser children in Song Hae-sung's Boomerang Family. Later that year, Youn appeared in her first reality show, Sisters Over Flowers, in which she and other "sisters" travel to Croatia. She then appeared on several more reality shows, revealing a warmer, more approachable side of her personality.

Youn had two leading roles in 2015: in Kang Je-gyu's Salut d'Amour, about a romance between an elderly supermarket employee and a flower shop owner, and in Canola, about a Jeju Island diver who reunites with her long-lost granddaughter. Salut d'Amour was Youn's first collaboration with actor Park Geun-hyung since 1971.

In 2020, Youn made her Hollywood debut in the film Minari. She plays Soon-ja, a grandmother of a Korean-American family in rural Arkansas, and received over 40 American regional critics' awards, including wins from the National Board of Review and the Los Angeles Film Critics Association. Youn became the first Korean actress to win an Academy Award for Best Supporting Actress, SAG Award for Outstanding Performance by a Female Actor in a Supporting Role, and BAFTA Award for Best Actress in a Supporting Role. She is also the first Asian actress to win an acting award in the motion pictures categories at the Screen Actors Guild Awards, the first Korean actress to win an Academy Award, and the first Asian actress to win an Academy Award since 1958, when Miyoshi Umeki won Best Supporting Actress for Sayonara.

In April 2021, Film at Lincoln Center hosted a five-film retrospective of her career. In September, Time magazine named her one of the 100 most "Influential People in the World" in 2021. In October, she received the Order of Cultural Merit.

In December 2022, Youn's contract with Hook Entertainment ended, and she decided not to renew it. In January 2023, Youn signed with Creative Artists Agency.

== Personal life ==
In December 1973, at the height of her career, Youn and her fiancé, singer Jo Young-nam, immigrated to the United States, when evangelist Billy Graham invited Jo to perform at his crusades across the country. The couple married in 1974 and have two sons. They lived in St. Petersburg, Florida for 10 years, during which Youn worked at a supermarket to help raise family. She returned to Korea in 1984 and divorced Jo in 1987 due to his repeated extramarital affairs.

Youn has two younger sisters, one of whom is Youn Yeo-soon, a former executive at LG Group.

== Filmography ==
=== Film ===
Year	Title		Role	Notes	Ref.
Year	English	Korean	Role	Notes	Ref.
1971	Woman of Fire	화녀	Myeong-ja		
1972	The Insect Woman	충녀	Myeong-ja		
1973	Love and Hatred	다정다한			
1973	Tto Sun Yi, a College Girl	여대생 또순이			
1978	The Day and Night of a Korean-American	코메리칸의 낮과 밤			
1985	Mother	어미	Hong Kyeong-ae		
1990	Be a Wicked Woman	천사여 악녀가 되라	Choi Yuh-jung		
1995	An Experience to Die For	죽어도 좋은 경험	Choi Yeo-jung		
2003	A Good Lawyer's Wife	바람난 가족	Hong Byeong-han		
2004	Springtime	꽃피는 봄이 오면	Hyun-woo's mother		
2005	The President's Last Bang	그때 그사람들	Yoon-hee's mother/Epilogue narration		
2006	Maundy Thursday	우리들의 행복한 시간	Sister Monica		
2007	The Old Garden	오래된 정원	Hyun-woo's mother		
2007	Hwang Jin-yi	황진이	Old woman		
2008	A Tale of Legendary Libido	가루지기	Old woman		
2009	Actresses	여배우들	Herself	Also screenwriter	
2010	Hahaha	하하하	Moon-kyeong's mother		
2010	The Housemaid	하녀	Byeong-sik		
2011	Hindsight	푸른 소금	Madame Kang		
2011	List	리스트		Short film	
2012	The Taste of Money	돈의 맛	Baek Geum-ok		
2012	In Another Country	다른 나라에서	Park Sook		
2013	Behind the Camera	뒷담화: 감독이 미쳤어요	Herself		
2013	Boomerang Family	고령화가족	Mom		
2014	Hill of Freedom	자유의 언덕	Gu-ok		
2015	Salut d'Amour	장수상회	Im Geum-nim		
2015	Intimate Enemies	나의 절친 악당들	Yeo-jung	Cameo	
2015	Right Now, Wrong Then	지금은맞고그때는틀리다	Kang Deok-soo		
2016	Canola	계춘할망	Gye-choon		
2016	The Bacchus Lady	죽여주는 여자	So-young		
2018	Keys to the Heart	그것만이 내 세상	In-sook		
2019	Lucky Chan-sil	찬실이는 복도 많지	Grandmother		
2020	Beasts Clawing at Straws	지푸라기라도 잡고 싶은 짐승들	Soon-ja		
2020	Minari		Soon-ja	Won: Academy Award for Best Supporting Actress	
2021	Heaven: To the Land of Happiness	헤븐: 행복의 나라로	Mrs. Yoon		
2024	Dog Days	도그데이즈	Min-seo		
2025	The Wedding Banquet		Ja-Young	American-Korean co-production	

=== Television ===
Year	Title		Role	Notes	Ref.
Year	English	Korean	Role	Notes	Ref.
1967	Mister Gom	미스터 곰			
1970	The Appearance of the Wife	아내의 모습			
1970	Let's Live by the River	강변 살자			
1970		박마리아	MBC		
1970	River of Love and Sorrow	사랑과 슬픔의 강			
1971	Jang Hui-bin	장희빈	Hui-bin Jang		
1972	Rainbow	무지개	President Han's daughter		
1972	Daewongun	대원군	Empress Myeongseong		
1972	Stepmother	새엄마	Eun-hye		
1976	Girl's High School Days	여고 동창생			
1984	MBC Bestseller Theater	MBC 베스트셀러극장 - 고깔		Episode: "고깔"	
1985	Mom's Room	엄마의 방			
1986	First Love	첫사랑			
1987	Love and Ambition	사랑과 야망	Song Hye-joo		
1988	Sand Castle	모래성	Kim Jin-ae		
1988	People from Wonmi-dong	원미동 사람들			
1989	Fetters of Love	사랑의 굴레			
1989	Seasonal bird	철새			
1989	Sleepless Tree	잠들지 않는 나무	Dance school teacher		
1990	Geomsaengyi's moon	검생이의 달			
1990	Betrayal of the Rose	배반의 장미	Ok-sun		
1991	What Is Love	사랑이 뭐길래	Han Shim-ae		
1991	Another Happiness	또 하나의 행복			
1992	Bun-rye's Story	분례기	Bun-rye's mother		
1992	Gwanchon Essay	관촌 수필			
1992	Women's Room	여자의 방			
1993	How's Your Husband?	댁의 남편은 어떠십니까?	Song Eun-nyeo		
1993	To Live	산다는 것은	Pung-gae's mother		
1994	Farewell	작별	Lee Shin-ae		
1995	Men of the Bath House	목욕탕집 남자들	Noh Hye-young		
1995	Your Voice	그대 목소리	Eon-nyeon-yi		
1995	MBC Best Theater	호스피스 아줌마	Jung-sook	Episode: "Hospice Ajumma"	
1996	Temptation	유혹			
1996	Ganyiyeok	간이역	Gangneung restaurant owner		
1996	Open Your Heart	가슴을 열어라	Choi Soon-joo		
1997	The Reason I Live	내가 사는 이유	Bar madam Son		
1997	Woman Next Door	이웃집 여자			
1997	MBC Best Theater - Bok-soon's Boomerang	MBC 베스트극장 - 복순씨의 부메랑	Actuary Bok-soon		
1998	Firstborn	맏이	Choi Sook-ja		
1998	Love Is All I Know	사랑 밖엔 난 몰라			
1998	Hong Gil-dong	홍길동	In-ok's mother		
1998	Lie	거짓말	Yoon Young-hee		
1998	Crush	짝사랑			
1999	KAIST	카이스트	Professor of Mechanical Engineering		
1999	Did We Really Love?	우리가 정말 사랑했을까	Choi Hye-ja		
1999	Who Are You	당신은 누구시길래	Jung Shin-ae		
1999	Hur Jun	허준	Sung In-chul's wife		
2000	Tough Guy's Love	꼭지	Kim Bok-nyeo		
2000	I Want to Keep Seeing You	자꾸만 보고 싶네	Lee Ok-bun		
2001	Stock Flower	비단향꽃무	Ahn Jung-hee		
2001	Blue Mist	푸른 안개	Mi-soon		
2001	Hotelier	호텔리어	Yoon Bong-sook		
2001	Soon-ja	순자	Go Chang-daek		
2001	MBC Best Theater	동행II	Geum-nyeo	Episode: "Walking With II"	
2001	This Is Love	사랑은 이런거야	Lee Jung-ja		
2001	I Like Dong-seo	동서는 좋겠네	Choi Jong-sook		
2002	Ruler of Your Own World	네 멋대로 해라	Jung Yoo-soon		
2002	Affection	정	Ms. Uhm		
2002	Who's My Love?	내사랑 누굴까	In-ae		
2002	Dal-joong's Cinderella	달중씨의 신데렐라	Pal-soon		
2003	Pearl Necklace	진주목걸이	Yoon Hae-myung		
2003	One Million Roses	백만송이 장미	Choi Geum-ja		
2003	Rose Fence	장미울타리	Mrs. Heo		
2003	On the Prairie	저 푸른 초원위에	Kim Jeom-hee		
2004	Ireland	아일랜드	Shi-yeon's mother		
2004	War of the Roses	장미의 전쟁	Heo Young-shim		
2004	Drama City- Our Ham	우리 햄	Grandma		
2005	Becoming a Popular Song	유행가가 되리	Oh Sook-young		
2005	Be Strong, Geum-soon!	굳세어라 금순아	Geum-soon's grandmother		
2005	A Farewell to Sorrow	슬픔이여안녕	Lee Young-shim		
2005	Love and Sympathy	사랑공감	Hee-soo's mother		
2006	Love Truly	진짜 진짜 좋아해	Goo Hyang-sook		
2006	Hearts of Nineteen	열아홉 순정	Yoon Myung-hye		
2006	What's Up Fox?	여우야 뭐하니	Jo Soon-nam		
2007	The Person I Love	사랑하는 사람아	Yoon Min-ja		
2007	The Golden Age of Daughters-in-Law	며느리 전성시대	Seo Mi-soon		
2008	Chunja's Special Day	춘자네 경사났네	Yang Boon-hee		
2008	Worlds Within	그들이 사는 세상	Oh Min-sook		
2009	The Road Home	집으로 가는 길	Nam Soon-jung		
2009	Heading to the Ground	맨땅에 헤딩	Ae-ja		
2010	Golden Fish	황금물고기	Jo Yoon-hee		
2010	Home Sweet Home	즐거운 나의 집	Sung Eun-sook		
2011	Listen to My Heart	내 마음이 들리니	Hwang Soon-geum		
2012	My Husband Got a Family	넝쿨째 굴러온 당신	Uhm Chung-ae		
2012	The King 2 Hearts	더킹 투하츠	Bang Young-sun		
2013	The Queen's Classroom	여왕의 교실	Yong Hyun-ja		
2014	Wonderful Days	참 좋은 시절	Jang So-shim		
2015	The Producers	프로듀사	Herself	2 episodes	
2015–2017	Sense8		Min-jung		
2016	Dear My Friends	디어 마이 프렌즈	Oh Choong-nam		
2017	Highland				
2019	Never Twice	두 번은 없다	Bok Mak-rye		
2022	The Boys Presents: Diabolical		Sun-Hee (voice)	Episode: "John and Sun-Hee"	
2022–2024	Pachinko		Kim Sunja / Bando Nobuko		
2026	Beef		Chairwoman Park	Main cast (season 2)	

=== Variety shows ===
Year	Title	Role	Ref.
2013	Sisters Over Flowers	Cast member	
2017–2018	Youn's Kitchen	Cast member	
2018	Master in the House	Fourth Master	
2021	Youn's Stay	Cast member	
2022	Unexpected Journey	Cast member	

== Theater ==
Year	Title		Role	Theater	Date	Notes/Ref.
Year	English	Korean	Role	Theater	Date	Notes/Ref.
1966	The Emigrant Ship	이민선	Miss Kim	National Theater of Korea (Myeongdong)	June 2–8	
1971	Cherry Blossom	꽃피는 체리		National Theater of Korea (Myeongdong)	June	
1971	Henry VIII and his ladies	헨리 8세와 그의 여인들		National Theater of Korea (Myeongdong)	October	
1972	Injustice Ward	부정병동		National Theater of Korea (Myeongdong)	March	
1985	'night, Mother	잘자요, 엄마	—N/a	Sanwoolim Small Theater	May 19 – July 26	translator
1990	Woman in Crisis	위기의 여자	Monique	Sanwoolim Small Theater	May 15 – June 20	
1990–1991	Woman in Crisis	위기의 여자	Monique	Sanwoolim Small Theater	December 12 – January 31	
1991	The Man I Don't Want to Marry	결혼하기 싫은 남자		Samtoh Blue Bird Theater	September 19 – October 27	
1997	The Glass Menagerie	유리동물원	Amanda	Dongsoong Art Center in Daehangno, Seoul	February 7 – March 2	

== Accolades ==
=== Awards and nominations ===
Year	Award	Category	Nominated work	Result
1969	TBC Drama Awards	Best New Talent	Mister Gong	Won
1971	Sitges Film Festival	Best Actress	Woman of Fire	Won
1971	Blue Dragon Film Awards	Best Actress	Woman of Fire	Won
1971	Grand Bell Awards	Best New Actress	Woman of Fire	Won
1992	Korean Broadcasting Awards	Best Female Talent	Bun-rye's Story	Won
1993	Baeksang Arts Awards	Best Actress –Television	Gwanchon Essay	Nominated
2003	Busan Film Critics Awards	Best Supporting Actress	A Good Lawyer's Wife	Won
2003	Korean Film Awards	Best Supporting Actress	A Good Lawyer's Wife	Won
2004	Grand Bell Awards	Best Supporting Actress	A Good Lawyer's Wife	Nominated
2004	Korean Film Awards	Best Supporting Actress	Springtime	Nominated
2005	KBS Drama Awards	Best Actress in a One-Act Special/Drama	Becoming a Popular Song	Won
2010	Busan Film Critics Awards	Best Actress	The Housemaid, Hahaha, Actresses	Won
2010	Sitges Film Festival	Maria Honorifica Award	—N/a	Won
2010	People Who Make the World Brighter Awards	Recipient, Culture and Arts category	—N/a	Won
2010	Chunsa Film Art Awards	Best Supporting Actress	The Housemaid	Won
2010	Buil Film Awards	Best Supporting Actress	The Housemaid	Won
2010	Grand Bell Awards	Best Supporting Actress	The Housemaid	Won
2010	Korean Film Awards	Best Supporting Actress	The Housemaid	Won
2010	Blue Dragon Film Awards	Best Supporting Actress	The Housemaid	Won
2010	Cinemanila International Film Festival	Best Actress	The Housemaid	Won
2011	Max Movie Awards	Best Actress	The Housemaid	Nominated
2011	Max Movie Awards	Best Supporting Actress	The Housemaid	Won
2011	Asian Film Awards	Best Supporting Actress	The Housemaid	Won
2012	Buil Film Awards	Best Supporting Actress	The Taste of Money	Nominated
2012	Korea Drama Awards	Top Excellence Award, Actress	My Husband Got a Family	Nominated
2012	KBS Drama Awards	Grand Prize (Daesang)	My Husband Got a Family	Nominated
2012	KBS Drama Awards	Top Excellence Award, Actress	My Husband Got a Family	Nominated
2012	KBS Drama Awards	Excellence Award, Actress in a Serial Drama	My Husband Got a Family	Won
2013	Grand Bell Awards	Best Actress	Boomerang Family	Nominated
2014	KBS Drama Awards	Grand Prize (Daesang)	Wonderful Days	Nominated
2014	KBS Drama Awards	Top Excellence Award, Actress	Wonderful Days	Nominated
2014	KBS Drama Awards	Excellence Award, Actress in a Serial Drama	Wonderful Days	Nominated
2016	Korean Film Shining Star Awards	Star award	Canola	Won
2016	Grand Bell Awards	Best Actress	Canola	Nominated
2016	Asia Pacific Screen Awards	Jury Grand Prize	The Bacchus Lady	Won
2016	Asia Pacific Screen Awards	Best Actress	The Bacchus Lady	Nominated
2016	Blue Dragon Film Awards	Best Actress	The Bacchus Lady	Nominated
2016	Fantasia Festival	Best Actress	The Bacchus Lady	Won
2016	Women in Film Korea Awards	Woman in Film of the Year	The Bacchus Lady	Won
2017	Baeksang Arts Awards	Grand Prize – Film	The Bacchus Lady	Nominated
2017	Baeksang Arts Awards	Best Actress – Film	The Bacchus Lady	Nominated
2017	Wildflower Film Awards	Best Actress	The Bacchus Lady	Nominated
2017	Chunsa Film Art Awards	Best Actress	The Bacchus Lady	Nominated
2017	Buil Film Awards	Best Actress	The Bacchus Lady	Won
2017	Korea World Youth Film Festival	Favorite Actress - Senior Actress	The Bacchus Lady	Won
2020	Korean Film Producers Association	Best Supporting Actress	Lucky Chan-sil	Won
2020	Boston Society of Film Critics	Best Supporting Actress	Minari	Won
2020	Chicago Film Critics Association	Best Supporting Actress	Minari	Runner-up
2020	Florida Film Critics Circle	Best Supporting Actress	Minari	Nominated
2020	Greater Western New York Film Critics Association	Best Supporting Actress	Minari	Won
2020	Indiana Film Journalists Association	Best Supporting Actress	Minari	Runner-up
2020	Los Angeles Film Critics Association	Best Supporting Actress	Minari	Won
2020	Sunset Film Critics Circle Awards	Best Supporting Actress	Minari	Won
2021	Academy Awards	Best Supporting Actress	Minari	Won
2021	AARP Movies For Grownups Awards	Best Supporting Actress	Minari	Nominated
2021	Alliance of Women Film Journalists Awards	Best Supporting Actress	Minari	Won
2021	Atlanta Film Critics Circle	Best Supporting Actress	Minari	Runner-up
2021	Austin Film Critics Association	Best Supporting Actress	Minari	Won
2021	Black Film Critics Circle Awards	Best Supporting Actress	Minari	Won
2021	British Academy Film Awards	Best Actress in a Supporting Role	Minari	Won
2021	Chicago Indie Critics Awards	Best Supporting Actress	Minari	Nominated
2021	Columbus Film Critics Association	Best Supporting Actress	Minari	Won
2021	Critics' Choice Movie Awards	Best Supporting Actress	Minari	Nominated
2021	Denver Film Critics Society	Best Supporting Actress	Minari	Nominated
2021	Detroit Film Critics Society	Best Supporting Actress	Minari	Won
2021	DiscussingFilm Critic Awards	Best Supporting Actress	Minari	Won
2021	Dorian Awards	Best Supporting Actress	Minari	Won
2021	Georgia Film Critics Association	Best Supporting Actress	Minari	Won
2021	Gotham Independent Film Awards	Best Actress	Minari	Nominated
2021	Hollywood Critics Association	Best Supporting Actress	Minari	Won
2021	Houston Film Critics Society	Best Supporting Actress	Minari	Nominated
2021	Independent Spirit Awards	Best Supporting Female	Minari	Won
2021	International Cinephile Society	Best Supporting Actress	Minari	Runner-up
2021	Kansas City Film Critics Circle	Best Supporting Actress	Minari	Won
2021	Latino Entertainment Journalists Association	Best Supporting Actress	Minari	Won
2021	Music City Film Critics Association	Best Supporting Actress	Minari	Won
2021	National Board of Review	Best Supporting Actress	Minari	Won
2021	National Society of Film Critics	Best Supporting Actress	Minari	Runner-up
2021	New Mexico Film Critics Society	Best Supporting Actress	Minari	Won
2021	New York Film Critics Online	Best Supporting Actress	Minari	Won
2021	North Carolina Film Critics Association	Best Supporting Actress	Minari	Won
2021	North Dakota Film Society	Best Supporting Actress	Minari	Nominated
2021	North Texas Film Critics Association	Best Supporting Actress	Minari	Won
2021	Oklahoma Film Critics Circle	Best Supporting Actress	Minari	Won
2021	Online Association of Female Film Critics Awards	Best Supporting Actress	Minari	Won
2021	Online Film Critics Society	Best Supporting Actress	Minari	Nominated
2021	Palm Springs International Film Festival	Spotlight Award	Minari	Won
2021	Phoenix Film Critics Society	Best Supporting Actress	Minari	Won
2021	San Diego Film Critics Society	Best Supporting Actress	Minari	Won
2021	San Francisco Bay Area Film Critics Circle	Best Supporting Actress	Minari	Won
2021	Satellite Awards	Best Supporting Actress	Minari	Nominated
2021	Screen Actors Guild Awards	Outstanding Supporting Actress in a Motion Picture	Minari	Won
2021	Screen Actors Guild Awards	Outstanding Ensemble Cast in a Motion Picture	Minari	Nominated
2021	Seattle Film Critics Society	Best Supporting Actress	Minari	Won
2021	Southeastern Film Critics Association	Best Supporting Actress	Minari	Won
2021	St. Louis Film Critics Association	Best Supporting Actress	Minari	Won
2021	Toronto Film Critics Association	Best Supporting Actress	Minari	Nominated
2021	Utah Film Critics Association	Best Supporting Actress	Minari	Runner-up
2021	Vancouver Film Critics Circle	Best Supporting Actress	Minari	Won
2021	Washington D.C. Area Film Critics Association	Best Supporting Actress	Minari	Won
2021	Chunsa Film Art Awards 2021	Best Supporting Actress	Lucky Chan-sil	Nominated
2021	Brand of the Year Awards	Actor of the Year	—N/a	Won
2021	Visionary Awards (Note: Visionary Awards, which started in 2020, selects and awards people who lead roles in the Korean entertainment industry. It highlights the meaning and achievements of a person whose chosen trend keywords penetrated the entertainment industry, including broadcasting, movies, music, and performances, and presents the next vision of the cultural sector with outstanding achievements and influence.)	2021 Visionary	—N/a	Won
2021	Kino Lights Awards	Actress of The Year (Domestic)	Minari	2nd place
2022	Peabody Awards	Entertainment	Pachinko	Won
2026	Astra TV Awards	Best Supporting Actress in a Limited Series or TV Movie	Beef	Nominated
2026	Primetime Emmy Awards	Outstanding Supporting Actress in a Limited or Anthology Series or Movie	Beef	Nominated

=== State honors ===
Country	Year	Honor	Ref.
South Korea (Note: Honors are given at the Korean Popular Culture and Arts Awards, arranged by the Korea Creative Content Agency and hosted by the Ministry of Culture, Sports and Tourism. They are awarded to those who have contributed to the arts and South Korea's pop culture.)	2021	Golden Crown Order of Cultural Merit	

=== Listicles ===
Publisher	Year	Listicle	Placement	Ref.
Forbes	2022	Korea Power Celebrity 40	8th	
Gallup Korea	2021	Gallup Korea's Actor of the Year	2nd	
Gallup Korea	2022	Gallup Korea's Actor of the Year	4th	
Gold House (Note: The A100 List honours the most impactful Asians and Asian American & Pacific Islanders (AAPIs) in culture every May for AAPI Heritage Month. Gold House "champions trailblazing members of the AAPI community and their transformative contributions to entertainment, fashion, lifestyle, technology, business, social activism and politics from the past year".)	2022	A100 Entertainment List	Included	
Korean Film Council	2021	Korean Actors 200 (Note: Introduces 200 actors that best represent the present and future of Korean cinema to the people in the film industry all over the world.)	Included	
Sisa Journal	2021	Person Who Moved Korea — Culture	3rd	
Sisa Journal	2021	Most Influential Person in Broadcasting & Entertainment	4th	
Time	2021	100 Most Influential People in the World	Included	
Variety	2022	Women That Have Made an Impact in Global Entertainment	Included	

== Notes ==
Awards and achievements
Preceded by Laura Dern	Academy Award for Best Supporting Actress; 2020	Succeeded by Ariana DeBose
