= Kim Duk-koo =

South Korean boxer (1955–1982)

Personal information
- Nationality: South Korea
- Born: Lee Deok-gu; July 29, 1955 Banam-ri, Goseong County, Gangwon, South Korea
- Died: November 18, 1982 (aged 27) Paradise, Nevada, US
- Height: 5 ft 6 in (168 cm)
- Weight: Lightweight

Korean name
- Hangul: 김득구
- Hanja: 金得九
- RR: Gim Deukgu
- MR: Kim Tŭkku

Alternate name
- Hangul: 이덕구
- Hanja: 李德九
- RR: I Deokgu
- MR: I Tŏkku

Boxing career
- Reach: 65 in (165 cm)
- Stance: Southpaw

Boxing record
- Total fights: 20
- Wins: 17
- Win by KO: 8
- Losses: 2
- Draws: 1
- No contests: 0

Kim Duk-koo (Korean: 김득구; born Lee Deok-gu, 이덕구; July 29, 1955 – November 18, 1982) was a South Korean professional boxer who competed in the Lightweight division. He died after a world lightweight championship boxing match against Ray Mancini in 1982. His death sparked reforms aimed at better protecting the health of boxers, including reducing the number of rounds in championship bouts from 15 to 12.

== Early life and education ==
Kim was born Lee Deok-gu in Gangwon Province, 100 miles east of Seoul, the youngest of five children. His father died when he was two and his mother married three more times. Kim grew up poor. He worked odd jobs, such as a shoe shiner and a tour guide, before getting into boxing in 1976.

== Professional career ==
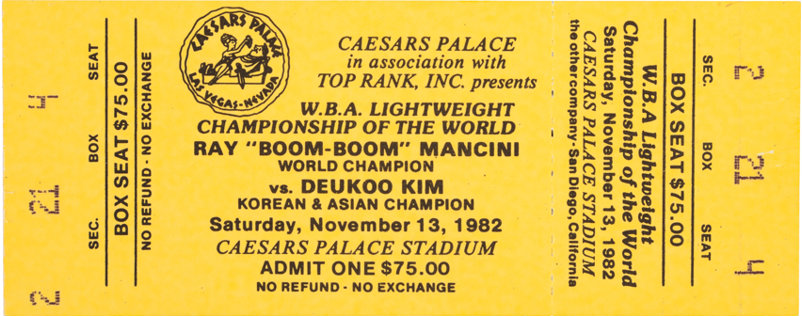
Ticket stub for Kim's final fight

After compiling a 29–4 amateur record, he turned professional in 1978. In February 1982, he won the Orient and Pacific Boxing Federation lightweight title and became the World Boxing Association's number 1 contender. Kim carried a 17–1–1 professional record into the Mancini fight and had won 8 bouts by KO before flying to Las Vegas as the world's (WBA) number 1 challenger to world lightweight champion Mancini. However, he had fought outside of South Korea only once before, in the Philippines. It was his first time ever fighting in North America.

=== Mancini match ===
Kim was lightly regarded by the US boxing establishment, but not by Ray Mancini, who believed the fight would be a "war". Kim struggled to lose weight in the days prior to the bout so that he could weigh in under the lightweight's 135-pound limit. Before the fight, Kim was quoted as saying "Either he dies, or I die." He wrote, in his native language, the message "kill or be killed" on his Las Vegas hotel lampshade only days before the bout.

Mancini and Kim met in an arena outside Caesars Palace on November 13, 1982 (the night after Aaron Pryor defeated Alexis Argüello). They went toe to toe for a good portion of the bout, to the point that Mancini briefly considered quitting. Kim tore open Mancini's left ear and puffed up his left eye, and Mancini's left hand swelled to twice its normal size. After the fight Mancini's left eye would be completely closed. However, by the later rounds, Mancini began to dominate, landing many more punches than Kim. In the 11th he buckled Kim's knees. In the beginning of the 13th round Mancini charged Kim with a flurry of 39 punches but had little effect. Sugar Ray Leonard (working as one of the commentators of the fight) said Kim came right back very strong. Leonard later declared the round to be closely contested. When the fighters came out for the 14th round, Mancini charged forward and hit Kim with a right. Kim reeled back, Mancini missed with a left, and then Mancini hit Kim with another hard right hand. Kim went flying into the ropes, his head hitting the canvas. Kim managed to rise unsteadily to his feet, but referee Richard Green stopped the fight and Mancini was declared the winner by TKO nineteen seconds into the 14th round. Ralph Wiley of Sports Illustrated, covering the fight, would later recall Kim pulling himself up the ropes as he was dying as "one of the greatest physical feats I had ever witnessed".

Minutes after the fight was over, Kim collapsed into a coma and was removed from the Caesars Palace arena on a stretcher and taken to the Desert Springs Hospital. At the hospital, he was found to have a subdural hematoma consisting of 100 cubic centimetres (100 ml) of blood in his skull. Emergency brain surgery was performed at the hospital to try to save him, but Kim died five days after the bout, on November 18 (he was declared legally dead by a Clark County, Nevada judge at 6 p.m. Pacific Standard Time on November 17). The neurosurgeon said it was caused by one punch. The week after, Sports Illustrated published a photo of the fight on its cover, under the heading Tragedy in the Ring. The profile of the incident was heightened by the fight having been televised live by CBS in the United States.

Kim had never fought a 15-round bout before. In contrast, Mancini was much more experienced at the time. He had fought 15-round bouts three times and gone on to round 14 once before. Kim compiled a record of 17 wins with two losses and one draw. Eight of Kim's wins were knockouts.

=== Aftermath of Kim's death ===
Mancini went through a period of reflection, as he blamed himself for Kim's death. After friends helped him by telling him that it was just an accident, Mancini went on with his career, though still haunted by Kim's death. His promoter, Bob Arum, said Mancini "was never the same" after Kim's death. Two years later, Mancini lost his title to Livingstone Bramble.

Four weeks after the fatal fight, the Mike Weaver vs. Michael Dokes fight at the same Caesars Palace venue ended with a technical knockout declared 63 seconds into the fight. Referee Joey Curtis admitted to stopping the fight early under orders of the Nevada State Athletic Commission, which required referees to be aware of a fighter's health, in light of the Mancini–Kim fight, and a rematch was ordered.

Kim's mother flew from South Korea to Las Vegas to be with her son before the life support equipment was turned off. Three months later, she committed suicide by drinking a bottle of pesticide. The bout's referee, Richard Green, committed suicide via self-inflicted gunshot wound on July 1, 1983.

Kim left behind a fiancée, Lee Young-mee, despite rules against South Korean boxers having girlfriends. At the time of Kim's death, Lee was pregnant with their son, Kim Chi-wan, who was born in July 1983. Kim Chi-Wan became a dentist.

Author Mark Kriegel was in Korea researching Kim's family for the Ray Mancini biography The Good Son: The Life of Ray "Boom Boom" Mancini when Kim Chi-wan informed Kriegel he wanted to see Mancini. A 2011 trip for Lee Young-mee and Kim Chi-wan to Santa Monica, California, was arranged where the two would visit Ray Mancini. Mancini and his three children Ray Jr., Leonardo, and Carmenina greeted Kim and Lee in a scene from the film version of the documentary (The Good Son) that was the signature denouement in the book and film. Christopher Tavlarides, the co-executive producer the film version, noted the difference between Champion, a 2002 dramatization of Kim's life and The Good Son. Champion was fictionalised and made without any consultation from Lee Young-mee or Ray Mancini, while both the Mancini and Kim families participated actively in producing The Good Son, which also notes the sense of guilt Mancini suffered after the contest.

Mancini noted in Athletes Quarterly about his visit for the family:

I felt it was important for Chi-wan to meet me, the last person that was in the ring with his father. But also it was important for me to meet him, because I wanted him to understand. It was important for me to know him and for him to know me, to know a little bit about what I’m about and my children. So when they came, and they had the cameras set up, they told me that Chi-wan and Young-mee were 10 minutes away, and I said to Jesse my camera man, ‘We’ve got one shot to do this. I am not going to do this again. There ain’t going to be a take two. Let it roll. What you see is what you get.

=== Boxing rule changes ===
The Nevada State Athletic Commission proposed a series of rule changes as a result, announcing it before a December 10 match between Michael Dokes and Mike Weaver that would in itself be disputed because of instructions match officials were given before the fight that was directly related to the Mancini-Kim match. Officials were told to be even more aware of a boxer's health in stopping a match. The break between rounds was initially proposed to go from 60 to 90 seconds (but it was later rescinded). The standing eight count (which allows a knockdown to be called even if the boxer is not down, but on the verge of being knocked down) was imposed, and new rules regarding suspension of licence were imposed, initially 45 days after a knockout loss.

The World Boxing Council (WBC), whose regional championship Kim held prior to relinquishing it for a WBA championship opportunity, announced during its annual convention of 1982 that many rules concerning fighters' medical care before fights needed to be changed. One of the most significant was the WBC's reduction of title fights from 15 rounds to 12. The World Boxing Association (WBA), which sanctioned the fatal match, and the International Boxing Federation (IBF) followed the WBC in 1987. When the World Boxing Organization (WBO) was formed in 1988, it immediately began operating with 12-round world championship bouts.

In the years after Kim's death, new medical procedures were introduced to fighters' pre-fight checkups, such as electrocardiograms, brain tests, and lung tests. As one boxing leader put it, "A fighter's check-ups before fights used to consist of blood pressure and heartbeat checks before 1982. Not anymore."

In Nevada, further regulations on a boxer's health were implemented following the 2005 deaths of Martín Sánchez and Leavander Johnson in separate matches. These regulations include regulations on weight cutting, concussions, and hydration that trainers must pass, including legalising sealed packets of sports beverages (instead of being water only), mandatory weights for gloves, and three ringside physicians on site that examine boxers at weigh-ins, before the contest, and immediately after the contest. In 2016, brain health testing became mandatory. Since these rules took effect, no boxer has been killed in Nevada matches.

== Professional boxing record ==
17 Wins (8 knockouts, 9 decisions), 2 Losses (1 decision 1 KO), 1 Draw
Res.	Record	Opponent	Type	Rd., Time	Date	Location	Notes
Loss	17–2–1	(United States) Ray Mancini	KO	14 (15) 0:19	November 13, 1982	Caesars Palace, Nevada, US	For WBA Lightweight title; Kim died 5 days later. Kim's WBC OPBF title vacated. (Note: By rule, a boxer must vacate his regional title when participating in a world title match.)
Win	17–1–1	(Japan) Tadao Ishido	TKO	4 (12)	July 18, 1982	Seoul, South Korea	For Kim's WBC OPBF lightweight title
Win	16–1–1	(Philippines) Nick Caputol	UD	10 (10)	June 21, 1982	Seoul, South Korea	Non-Championship bout
Win	15–1–1	Flash Villamer	UD	12 (12)	May 30, 1982	Seoul, South Korea	For Kim's WBC OPBF lightweight title
Win	14–1–1	Suradej Kiongphajorn	KO	1 (12)	April 4, 1982	Seoul, South Korea	For Kim's WBC OPBF lightweight title
Win	13–1–1	(Fifth Republic of Korea) Kwang-min Kim	UD	12 (12)	February 28, 1982	Seoul, South Korea	For WBC OPBF lightweight title
Win	12–1–1	(Japan) Katsuhiro Okubo	TKO	3 (10)	December 12, 1981	Seoul, South Korea	
Win	11–1–1	(Philippines) Flash Romeo	KO	4 (10)	September 9, 1981	Seoul, South Korea	
Win	10–1–1	(Philippines) Jun Escalera	PTS	10 (10)	August 16, 1981	Seoul, South Korea	
Win	9–1–1	(Fifth Republic of Korea) Hong-kyu Lim	TKO	4 (10)	April 22, 1981	Seoul, South Korea	
Win	8–1–1	(Fourth Republic of Korea) Pil-gu Lee	PTS	10 (10)	December 6, 1980	Seoul, South Korea	Lightweight title
Win	7–1–1	(Philippines) Tony Flores	TKO	8 (10)	July 16, 1980	Metro Manila, Philippines	
Win	6–1–1	(Fourth Republic of Korea) Han-ki Choi	KO	8 (8)	June 21, 1980	Seoul, South Korea	
Draw	5–1–1	(Fourth Republic of Korea) Chang-pyo Kim	PTS	8 (8)	February 26, 1980	Pusan, South Korea	
Win	5–1	(Fourth Republic of Korea) Young-dae Kim	PTS	4 (4)	October 6, 1979	Seoul, South Korea	
Win	4–1	(Fourth Republic of Korea) Suk-soo Chang	PTS	4 (4)	September 1, 1979	Seoul, South Korea	
Win	3–1	(Fourth Republic of Korea) Myung-soo Park	KO	1 (4)	March 25, 1979	Ulsan, South Korea	
Loss	2–1	(Fourth Republic of Korea) Jong-sil Lee	PTS	4 (4)	December 9, 1978	Seoul, South Korea	
Win	2–0	(Fourth Republic of Korea) Young-wung Sung	PTS	4 (4)	December 8, 1978	Seoul, South Korea	
Win	1–0	(Fourth Republic of Korea) Myung-soo Park	PTS	4 (4)	December 7, 1978	Seoul, South Korea	Professional debut

== In popular culture ==
Champion is a 2002 South Korean film about the life and career of Kim, played by Yu Oh-seong.

The Warren Zevon song "Boom Boom Mancini" references the fatal fight with Kim.

The San Francisco-based band Sun Kil Moon's first album, Ghosts of the Great Highway, includes a fifteen-minute track titled "Duk Koo Kim" which references the Mancini fight. The song was included in a 2011 article titled "Sports Illustrated's Ultimate Playlist".

The 2012 Mark Kriegel biography The Good Son: The Life of Ray "Boom Boom" Mancini and related film The Good Son feature as part of its story denouement Kim's girlfriend and son visiting Mancini and his children 29 years after the fatal contest. Kim Chi-wan requested to visit to Mancini when Kriegel interviewed Lee and Kim for the documentary.

== See also ==
- Tan Teng Kee (died 1935), reported as one of the early boxing fatalities outside of Singapore
- Benny Paret (1937–1962), Cuban boxer who died after a match against Emile Griffith
- Davey Moore (1933–1963), another boxer who famously died from an injury sustained in the ring
- Choi Yo-sam (1972–2008), former world champion who died after winning his final fight
- Johnny Owen (1956–1980), Welsh boxer never regained consciousness after being knocked out in the twelfth round of a WBC World Bantamweight title fight against Lupe Pintor
- Kiko Bejines (1962-1983), the first boxer to die in a world title fight after Kim
- List of deaths due to injuries sustained in boxing
