= The Good Son: The Life of Ray "Boom Boom" Mancini =

- Film poster
- Directed by: Jesse James Miller
- Produced by: Christopher Tavlarides and Jimmy Lynn, Sophia Entertainment
- Starring: Ray Mancini; Sugar Ray Leonard
- Distributed by: SnagFilms
- Release date: August 9, 2013
- Country: United States
- Language: English

The Good Son: The Life of Ray "Boom Boom" Mancini is a 2013 American documentary about the life of boxer Ray Mancini, with an emphasis on the Kim Duk-koo contest, with its denouement based on Kim's partner Lee Young-mee and son Kim Chi-wan (born six months after the fatal match) visiting Mancini in his Santa Monica, California home.
