= The Day He Arrives =

2011 film by Hong Sang-soo

- Theatrical release poster
- Hangul: 북촌 방향
- Hanja: 北村 方向
- RR: Bukchon banghyang
- MR: Pukch'on panghyang
- Directed by: Hong Sang-soo
- Written by: Hong Sang-soo
- Produced by: Kim Kyoung-hee
- Starring: Yoo Jun-sang; Kim Sang-joong; Song Seon-mi; Kim Bo-kyung
- Cinematography: Kim Hyung-koo
- Edited by: Hahm Sung-won
- Music by: Jeong Yong-jin
- Production company: Jeonwonsa Films
- Distributed by: Jeonwonsa Films; JoseE Films
- Release dates: 19 May 2011 (Cannes); 8 September 2011 (South Korea)
- Running time: 79 minutes
- Country: South Korea
- Language: Korean
- Box office: US$320,421

The Day He Arrives (Korean: 북촌 방향; RR: Bukchon banghyang; lit. 'Towards Bukchon') is a 2011 South Korean drama film written and directed by Hong Sang-soo. The film is in black and white. It premiered on 19 May 2011 in the Un Certain Regard section of the 64th Cannes Film Festival. The film received 45,223 admissions on its domestic release.

== Plot ==
Seong-jun heads to Seoul to meet a close friend who lives in Bukchon (북촌; lit. 'North Village') in Jongno District. When the friend does not answer his calls, Seong-jun wanders around Bukchon and runs into an actress he used to know. The two talk for a while but soon part. He makes his way down to Insa-dong and drinks makgeolli (rice wine) by himself. Some film students at another table ask him to join them—Seong-jun used to be a film director. He soon gets drunk and heads for his ex-girlfriend's house.

Unclear if it is the next day or some other day, Seong-jun is still wandering around Bukchon. He runs into the actress again. They talk and soon part. He eventually meets his friend and they head to a bar called Novel with a female professor his friend knows. The owner of the bar has a striking resemblance to Seong-jun's ex-girlfriend. He plays the piano for her.

Again unclear if it is the next day or some other day, Seong-jun goes to the Jeongdok Public Library with his friend and mentions that it was the first place he chased after a woman. Later, they have drinks with a former actor who had been doing business in Vietnam. The same female professor joins them and the four go to the bar called Soseol (lit. "Novel"). Seong-jun gets drunk and ends up kissing the owner of the pub.

Seong-jun may have spent a few days in Seoul with his friend, or it may still be his first day there. He may have learned something from the encounter with his ex-girlfriend, or may have to meet the woman who resembles her again, for the first time. As life presents itself in no more than today's worth of time, Seong-jun also has no other choice than to face his "today".

== Cast ==
- Yoo Jun-sang as Seong-jun, a professor of film studies
- Kim Sang-joong as Young-ho, a film critic and friend of Seong-jun
- Song Seon-mi as Bo-ram, a professor of film studies
- Kim Bo-kyung as Kyung-jin (Seong-jun's ex-girlfriend) / Ye-jeon (bar owner)
- Kim Eui-sung as Joong-won, an ex-actor
- Park Soo-min as an actress
- Go Hyun-jung as a cinema fan
- Gi Ju-bong as a producer
- Baek Jong-hak as a director
- Baek Hyun-jin as a composer
- Ahn Jae-hong as student 1
- Bae Yoo-ram as student 2
- Jeong Ji-hyeong as student 3

== Reception ==
The Day He Arrives holds an 83/100 average on Metacritic.

American writer and critic Nick Newman placed The Day He Arrives on his 2022 Sight and Sound list of the greatest films ever made, calling it "the closest a movie has come to telling us the meaning of life."

== See also ==
- List of black-and-white films produced since 1970
