= Friend (2001 film) =

2001 film by Kwak Kyung-taek

- Theatrical release poster
- Hangul: 친구
- Hanja: 親舊
- RR: Chingu
- MR: Ch'in'gu
- Directed by: Kwak Kyung-taek
- Written by: Kwak Kyung-taek
- Produced by: Seok Myeong-hong; An Chang-guk; Hyeon Gyeong-rim; Jo Won-jang
- Starring: Yu Oh-seong; Jang Dong-gun; Seo Tae-hwa; Jung Woon-taek; Kim Bo-kyung
- Cinematography: Hwang Gi-seok
- Edited by: Park Gok-ji
- Music by: Choi Man-sik; Choi Sun-sik; Im Ju-hui; Choi Seung-hyun; Oh Hye-won; Luc Baiwir
- Distributed by: Korea Pictures
- Release date: March 31, 2001
- Running time: 118 minutes
- Country: South Korea
- Language: Korean
- Box office: $44 million

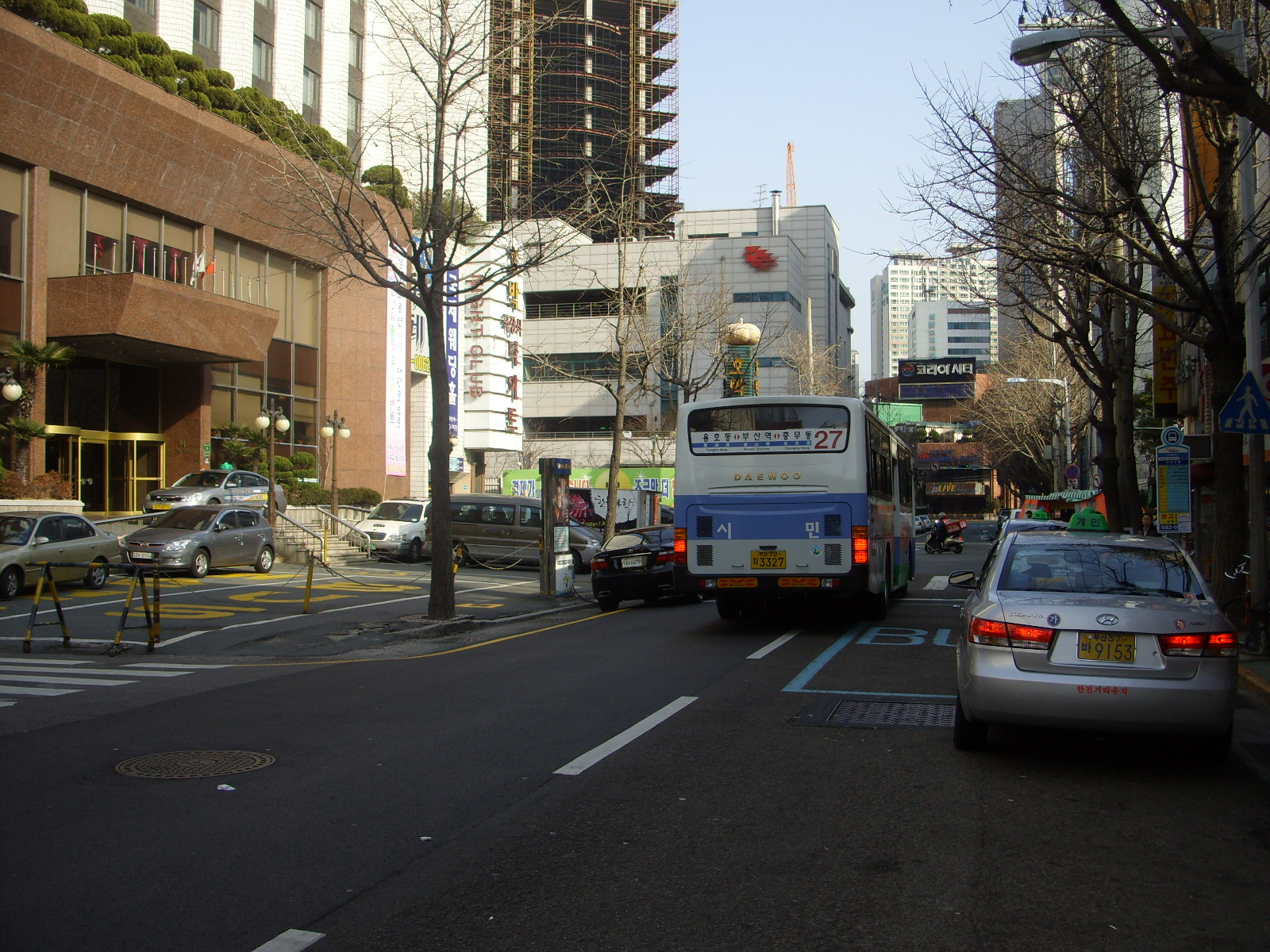
Gukje Hotel & Hobak Night Club in Busan, South Korea: the location for Friend.

Friend (Korean: 친구) is a 2001 South Korean neo-noir action film written and directed by Kwak Kyung-taek. Upon its release, it became the highest-grossing South Korean movie up to that time. Its record was surpassed in 2003 by Silmido.

This film is the director's experiences with his friends, a semi-autobiography set in his hometown, Busan, and the actors speak with a strongly accented Busan dialect. The film changed the public images of Jang Dong-gun and Yu Oh-seong; previously, Jang had been famous for romantic comedies and Yu had appeared in movies with mostly cult interest.

== Plot ==
The film follows the lives of four childhood friends: Joon-seok, the leader of the group whose father is a powerful mob boss; Dong-su, whose father is an undertaker; class clown Jung-ho; and Sang-taek, who was an exemplary student. As children, they play together and sell sexually explicit pictures. In high school, they become smitten with the lead singer of a girl band their age. Joon-seok invites the band to a party at his house, where Sang-taek receives his first kiss from the lead singer, Jin-sook.

In school, Joon-seok and Dong-su get in trouble after a confrontation with a teacher; they apologize and only receive a light suspension. During an outing to the movies, Sang-taek catches the eye of a school kid he had picked a fight with earlier. Joon-seok and Dong-su fend off a whole rival school while Jung-ho protects Sang-taek. Dong-su smashes the school's glass cases with its awards and trophies and drops out of school. After graduation, Sang-taek and Jung-ho go to college but the others do not.

A few years later, Sang-taek and Jung-ho return to find Joon-seok married to Jin-sook. He is suffering withdrawal symptoms and is abusive towards his wife as a result of being addicted to philopon. Later, he recovers from his addiction, divorces his wife, and mourns his father's death. He assumes his father's role as a crime lord, working under Hyung-doo. Dong-su becomes a mobster with a rival organization, led by Sang-gon.

Joon-seok, Sang-taek, and Jung-ho remain close, drinking, singing karaoke, and eating galbi together. After Dong-su causes Joon-seok's boss to be imprisoned, a rogue assassination attempt, headed by Doruko, is led against Dong-su without Joon-seok's knowledge. The attack fails, and in retaliation, Dong-su mounts an attack on Joon-seok's fishing facilities, during which many of Joon-seok's men, including Doruko, are killed. Joon-seok talks to Dong-su and asks if he would like to accompany him to see Sang-taek off to America. Dong-su says no. He asks Dong-su to leave for Hawaii until the situation returns to normal, but Dong-su refuses, telling Joon-seok that he should be the one to go. After Joon-seok leaves their meeting, Dong-su reflects and asks one of his men to take him to the airport. However, outside his car, he is stabbed to death.

A few years later, Sang-taek returns to South Korea upon finishing his study abroad. Jung-ho explains that Joon-seok's gang sent him into hiding abroad. After two years, he was unable to stand the hiding any longer. He was caught in a foreign bar, found with severe self-inflicted wounds. Joon-seok stood trial for Dong-su's murder and pleaded guilty to ordering Dong-su's death.

Sang-taek visits Joon-seok in prison, and the two talk like old friends. Sang-taek asks why he pleaded guilty in court. Joon-seok simply replies, "Embarrassment. Me and Dong-su are mobsters. Mobsters shouldn't be embarrassed." Sang-taek and Joon-seok part ways, with Sang-taek promising to visit every month. The film ends with Joon-seok walking to his fate in prison life, and Sang-taek reflecting on the past when they were all children, when they were all good friends.

== Cast ==
- Yu Oh-seong as Joon-seok
- Jang Dong-gun as Dong-su
- Seo Tae-hwa as Sang-taek
- Jung Woon-taek as Jung-ho
- Kim Bo-kyung as Jin-sook
- Gi Ju-bong as "mustache"
- Lee Jae-yong as "blade scar"
- Joo Hyun as Joon-seok's father
- Kim Joon-beom as young Sang-taek
- Kang Shin-il as Sang-taek's father
- Kwon Nam-hee as Sang-taek's mother
- Park Nam-hee as Joon-seok's mother
- Tiger JK as Crime boss Kim
- Kim Jung-tae as Dorooko

== Reception ==
It was the highest-grossing film for the year in Korea with 2.58 million admissions.

== Awards ==
In 2001, Friend was nominated for five awards, three of which it won. At the 46th Asia-Pacific Film Festival, Yu Oh-seong and Jang Dong-gun won the Best Actor and Best Supporting Actor awards, respectively, for their performances in the film. At the 26th Montréal World Film Festival, Friend was nominated for the Grand Prix of the Americas award for best film, but lost to the Hungarian film Torzók and the Iranian film Baran. At the 16th Torino International Festival of Young Cinema, it won the Holden Award for best script, and was nominated, but missed out on, the Prize of the City of Torino award for best film.

In 2002, Friend received two more awards. It won the Student Jury Award at the 9th Manaki Brothers International Cinematographers' Film Festival, and Jung Woon-taek won Best New Actor at the Baeksang Arts Awards.

== Remake ==
Kwak Kyung-taek directed a 20-episode television remake starring Hyun Bin as Dong-su and Kim Min-jun as Joon-seok. It aired on MBC in 2009.

== Sequel ==
Yu Oh-seong reprised his role in the 2013 sequel, which takes place seventeen years after the events of this film. In it, Joon-seok meets the grown-up son of Dong-su (Kim Woo-bin), interspersed with scenes of Joon-seok's own father (Joo Jin-mo) in 1963.

Preceded by Joint Security Area (film)	Top box office of South Korea; 2001–2003	Succeeded by Silmido (film)

Preceded by Joint Security Area	Chunsa Film Art Awards for Best Film; 2001	Succeeded by Oasis
