= Kwak Kyung-taek =

South Korean film director (born 1966)

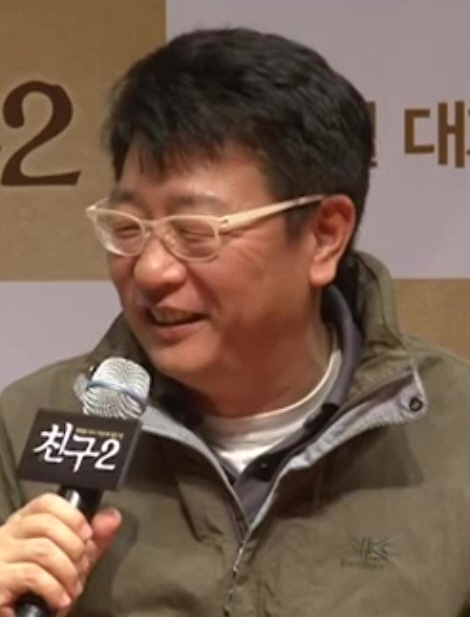
- Kwak in October 2013
- Born: May 23, 1966 (age 60); Pusan, South Korea
- Occupations: Film director, screenwriter
- Years active: 1997–present
- Relatives: Kwak Sin-ae (sister)

Korean name
- Hangul: 곽경택
- RR: Gwak Gyeongtaek
- MR: Kwak Kyŏngt'aek

Kwak Kyung-taek (Korean: 곽경택; born 23 May 1966) is a South Korean film director best known for his 2001 record-breaking film Friend.

== Career ==
Friend, a drama where conflicting criminal alliances turn old friends into enemies, set a new Korean box office record with an audience of 8 million, and he received the Holden Award for the Best Script at the 2001 Torino Film Festival. In 2003, he received an award at the Philadelphia Film Festival for the boxing drama film Champion. His 2005 action film Typhoon, however, was a commercial failure.

== Filmography as director ==
- Yeongchang Story (1995, short film)
- 3pm Bathhouse Paradise (1997)
- Dr. K (1999) Dr. K
- Friend (2001)
- Champion (2002)
- Mutt Boy (2003)
- Typhoon (2005)
- A Love (2007)
- Eye for an Eye (2008)
- Pained (2011)
- The Ugly Duckling (2012)
- Friend: The Great Legacy
- The Classified File (2015)
- RV: Resurrected Victims (2017)
- The Battle of Jangsari (2019)
- The Firefighters (2024)

== Awards and nominations ==
- 1995 2nd Seoul Short Film Festival Excellence Award, "Yeongchang Story"
- 2001 9th Chunsa Film Awards Director of the Year Award for Friend
- 2001 9th Chunsa Film Awards Chunsa Grand Prize Winner Friend
- 2001 Today's Young Artist Award Friend
- 2001 22nd Blue Dragon Film Awards Korean Film Audience Award : Friend
- 2007 27th Hawaii International Film Festival Best Director Award for A Love
- 2015 24th Buil Film Awards Best Director Award : The Classified File
- 2018 38th Korean Film Critics Association Awards Best Screenplay: RV: Resurrected Victims
- 2018 39th Blue Dragon Film Awards Best Screenplay: RV: Resurrected Victims
- 2019 55th Baeksang Arts Awards Film Category Screenplay Award: RV: Resurrected Victims
- 2025 12th Korean Film Producers Association Awards Best Director: The Firefighters
