= Lee Yoo-jin (filmmaker) =

South Korean filmmaker (born 1968)

- Born: 1968 (age 57–58); South Korea
- Other name: Eugene Lee
- Education: Ewha Womans University; Department of Educational Technology
- Occupation: Filmmaker
- Years active: 1996–present
- Employers: Bom Pictures; Zip Cinema

Korean name
- Hangul: 이유진
- RR: I Yujin
- MR: I Yujin

Lee Yoo-jin (Korean: 이유진) is a South Korean filmmaker and businesswoman. As CEO of Zip Cinema, a film production company based in Seoul, she is known for producing Hirokazu Kore-eda's critically acclaimed film Broker. Broker premiered at the 2022 Cannes Film Festival, where it competed for the Palme d'Or and won the Ecumenical Jury Award. The film also marked a historic win for Song Kang-ho, who became the first South Korean actor to win Best Actor in the Cannes Film Festival history. Additionally, the film won the Best International Film award in the CineMasters competition section at the Munich Film Festival.

Lee began her career in film marketing, working on E J-yong's film An Affair (1998) at the film company Bom. She made her debut as a producer with E J-yong's subsequent film, Untold Scandal (2003). After working on other major titles, including Park Jin-pyo's You Are My Sunshine (2005) and Kim Jee-woon's A Bittersweet Life (2005), she established Zip Cinema in 2005 and has served as its CEO ever since.

== Career ==
=== Early career in advertising ===
Lee began her professional career as a copywriter at Conrad, an advertising agency and subsidiary of the Haitai Group. During her seven-year tenure, she achieved significant professional recognition, most notably for the Daewoo Electronics "Tank Series" campaign. This campaign was instrumental in improving the brand's market image against competitors like Samsung and LG by emphasizing durability and featuring Chairman Bae Soon-hoon. Despite her success in advertising, Lee decided to transition into the film industry and resigned from Conrad in 1997. Her departure was initially met with resistance; the agency refused to formally accept her resignation for over a year, continuing to deposit her salary and keeping her position open in hopes of her return. Her colleagues at the time characterized the move as a significant risk, describing her departure from a successful agency for the uncertain film industry as choosing a "bed of thorns" over a "bed of flowers."

=== Transition to film marketing and finding success with Affairs ===
Lee began her film career as the marketing director at BOM Film Productions, led by her cousin Oh Jung-wan. Transitioning from the structured environment of the Conrad agency to a small team of fewer than ten employees, Lee's role expanded to include planning, casting, and manual labor. This move involved a significant salary reduction, from 40 million won to 7 million won annually. Lee described the shift as "standing in a wilderness," noting the intense commitment required for long-term film projects compared to her previous background in advertising.

Despite early challenges, Lee committed to establishing herself in the film industry. The premiere of her first project, An Affair, in October 1998 served as a career milestone. Witnessing long queues of viewers in Jongno, Seoul, during the Chuseok holiday provided her with a sense of professional fulfillment. Following this success, she formally notified the president of Conrad that she would not be returning to the advertising sector. An Affair was noted for its innovative marketing strategies, which included a poster featuring the title in vertical Chinese characters (情事) and a 15-second television commercial that recreated a key scene from the film.

Lee made her debut as a producer with E J-yong's film Untold Scandal (2003), which starred Bae Yong-joon, Jeon Do-yeon, and Lee Mi-sook. The film was a significant project for Kang, who sought to modernize the historical drama genre. She noted that previous historical films were often restricted to martial arts or erotic themes, making investors reluctant to fund projects lacking those elements. To reflect her innovative approach, she chose an English title for the production. The film became a commercial success, attracting 3.52 million viewers.

Following this, Lee produced A Table for Four and Three Monsters. She then produced Kim Jee-woon's A Bittersweet Life. Lee had previously followed Kim's work on A Tale of Two Sisters and expressed interest in his transition from horror to the film noir genre with A Bittersweet Life.

=== Establishment of Zip Cinema and early works ===
After contributing to major films such as Park Jin-pyo's You Are My Sunshine (2005) and Kim Jee-woon's A Bittersweet Life (2005), Lee Yoo-jin established Zip Cinema in December 2005 and has been its CEO since. Actor Bae Yong-joon's suggestion, whom she met during the production of Untold Scandal, influenced her decision to found the company, with the goal of "creating something of my own with greater initiative." In 2006, Zip Cinema released its first production, Park Jin-pyo's Voice of a Murderer, starring Sul Kyung-gu, which achieved sales of 3 million tickets.

The following year, Lee produced Hur Jin-ho's Happiness. 2007 also marked Lee's international recognition at the 32nd Toronto International Film Festival, where Variety magazine named her one of "10 Producers to Watch," the only Asian filmmaker to receive the honor. The magazine celebrated this achievement at an exclusive party on September 7, attended by 300 leading filmmakers from around the world.

Zip Cinema's third project was a collaboration with Soo Film to adapt Fumi Yoshinaga's manga Antique Bakery. Min Kyu-dong directed the film, which featured Ju Ji-hoon, Kim Jae-wook, Yoo Ah-in, and Choi Ji-ho in its cast. Antique was selected to be screened at the 59th Berlin International Film Festival. While the film was released on DVD in the UK on February 11, 2013, as Antique Bakery, its official English title in South Korea and at international film festivals was simply Antique.

In 2009, Lee released two films. She reunited with Park Jin-pyo for Closer to Heaven, a romantic drama starring Ha Ji-won and Kim Myung-min. The film topped the South Korean box office for three weeks following its release on September 24, 2009. Closer to Heaven was the first melodrama since 2006's Maundy Thursday to sell over two million tickets and ultimately became the 10th highest-grossing film of the year with 2,153,068 admissions.

=== Established reputation as a leading producer ===
The other 2009 film saw Lee collaborate with a new director, Choi Dong-hoon, for Jeon Woo-chi: The Taoist Wizard, also known as Woochi: The Demon Slayer. This fantasy action-comedy, based on a Korean folktale, stars Gang Dong-won in the title role. It marked a departure for Choi from his previous heist films Tazza: The High Rollers and The Big Swindle. this big-budget, special effects-filled action romp that was equally popular with the Korean audience, earning over six million admissions over the 2009 Christmas period. The film became the 3rd best-selling film of 2009 in Korea, with 6,100,532 tickets sold nationwide.

Reuniting with Gang Dong-won, Lee worked with new director Kim Min-seok on Haunters, a science fiction action film. Haunters depicts the struggle between Cho-in (Gang Dong-won), a psychic who can control people's minds, and Kyu-nam (Go Soo), a man immune to Cho-in's powers. Prior to its release, Haunters recorded the highest advance ticket sales for a Korean film in 2010, with an 83.47 percent booking rate; this was the first time since The Host (2006) that a film surpassed the 80 percent mark. The film debuted at number one at the South Korean box office and maintained the top spot for two weeks, ultimately selling 2,152,577 tickets nationwide. At the Asian Film Market during the 2010 Busan International Film Festival, distribution rights were sold to several international markets.

Lee later collaborated with director Min Kyu-dong again on the romantic comedy All About My Wife, a remake of the Argentine film Un novio para mi mujer ("A Boyfriend for My Wife"). The story center on a timid husband who hires a professional Casanova to seduce his seemingly perfect but fearsome wife, hoping this will make her divorce him. The film, which features Im Soo-jung, Lee Sun-kyun and Ryu Seung-ryong, was released in theaters on May 17, 2012. Debuting at the top of the local box office, the film successfully outperformed Hollywood blockbusters The Avengers and Men in Black 3. Driven by positive word-of-mouth, it concluded its commercial run with over 4.5 million total admissions.

In a notable reunion with Sul Kyung-gu after a few years, Lee produced the action thriller Cold Eyes, directed and written by Cho Ui-seok and Kim Byeong-seo, a remake of the 2007 Hong Kong film Eye in the Sky. The film stars Sul Kyung-gu alongside Jung Woo-sung and Han Hyo-joo, and follows detectives from the surveillance team of a special crime unit as they track down a highly efficient and dangerous robber and his crew. Cold Eyes made its North American premiere at the 2013 Toronto International Film Festival, and was also screened at the 2013 Busan International Film Festival in the Open Cinema section. The film earned box office records with 2.17 million admissions in its first week of release. After 17 days, it reached 4 million admissions, admissions.and ultimately reached 5,506,409 total admissions at the end of its run.

Her next project was reunion with director E J-yong in adapting the 2011 novel "My Palpitating Life" by Kim Ae-ran. The film marks director E J-yong's return to commercial filmmaking after focusing on low-budget experimental works such as Actresses (2009) and Behind the Camera (2013). In a 2014 interview with South China Morning Post, actors Song Hye-kyo and Gang Dong-won spoke about their decisions to sign on to My Brilliant Life, they stated that the script "read as more restrained, but nevertheless thought-provoking on the subjects of family and loss." My Brilliant Life won the Third Place Audience Award at the 17th Udine Far East Film Festival in 2015.

The film was released under CJ Entertainment in Korea on September 3, 2014. It also secured a release contract with Beijing Culture Media in 2014, although Spackman, the investment group under which Zip Cinema operates, declined to clarify whether Chinese distribution would be treated as an import or revenue-sharing quota release. In China, the film was distributed by China Film Group, the largest state-owned film enterprise in the country at the time, and opened on approximately 5,000 screens nationwide.

As of October 2018, the film has been screened on 629 screens, with 1,624,601 admissions and a gross of US$10,799,650 (approximately 12.3 billion won) in South Korean box offices. The film resonated particularly well with male viewers and parents. In its opening weekend, it ranked third, following the highly-popular Tazza 2 (2014) and English-language French film Lucy (2014). The film grossed a total of $7.89 million in its first three weekends.

As the producer for Zip Cinema for a decade, Lee achieved a notable success, with none of her films losing money. Only two, Happiness and Antique, failed to break even, but she recovered the cost with additional rights and overseas sales. Through her consistent production of successful films, Lee has established herself as one of the leading female producers in Chungmuro, alongside peers like Shim Jae-myung, CEO of Myung Films, known for Architecture 101. This marks a notable era for second-generation female producers, with Lee and her contemporaries making significant strides in the industry.

=== 10th anniversary of Zip Cinema and film The Priest ===
Lee's next project, The Priests held significant importance as both the tenth film and the tenth-anniversary production for Zip Cinema. While it marked a decade of work for the company, the project was considered a commercial risk due to its focus on the occult, a genre then underrepresented in South Korean cinema. The unconventional premise involved a priest attempting to rescue a possessed girl. The film was written and directed by Jang Jae-hyun, based on his award-winning short film 12th Assistant Deacon. The cast featured Kim Yoon-seok as Father Kim, Gang Dong-won as Deacon Choi, Park So-dam as Young-shin, and Kim Eui-sung as the Dean of Clergy. The Priests debuted at number one during its opening weekend, grossing ₩13 billion. By its third weekend, the film had grossed ₩35 billion at the South Korean box office.

=== International acclaim with Broker ===
Lee was the central figure behind the international co-production of Broker (2022), facilitating the collaboration between a diverse team of different nationalities and languages. The project's origins date back approximately five years before its release. Lee, who maintained a close friendship with director Hirokazu Kore-eda, became interested in the project after he shared the film's synopsis with her. Kore-eda had long desired to create a film in South Korea with Korean actors but had initially struggled with the narrative. He found inspiration after researching the "Baby Box," a system for mothers to anonymously leave infants. Lee accompanied Kore-eda on multiple research trips to Korea and supported the development process as he wrote and revised the script over several years.

Once the screenplay was complete, Lee immediately secured investment from CJ E&M and assembled a high-profile cast including Song Kang-ho, Gang Dong-won, Bae Doona, and IU. With this groundwork established, the production gained significant momentum. The film had its world premiere at the main competition of the 2022 Cannes Film Festival, where it won the Ecumenical Jury Award and the Best Actor Award for Song Kang-ho. Following Song's historic win as the first Korean male actor to receive the honor at Cannes, Lee praised his dedication, noting that his "passionate attitude towards his work is truly admirable." She reflected that even when she questioned the execution of a scene, Song provided "all plausibility with his unexpected acting."

== Filmography ==
Film(s) produced by Lee and Zip Cinema
Year	Film	Director	Co-producer	Distributor	Notes
2007	Voice of a Murderer	Park Jin-pyo		CJ Entertainment	
2007	Happiness	Hur Jin-ho	Liye Film	Showbox (주)Media Plex	
2008	Antique	Min Kyu-dong	Soo Film	Showbox (주)Media Plex	
2009	Closer to Heaven	Park Jin-pyo		CJ Entertainment	
2009	Jeon Woo-chi: The Taoist Wizard	Choi Dong-hoon		CJ Entertainment	
2010	Haunters	Kim Min-suk		NEW / United Pictures	
2012	All About My Wife	Min Kyu-dong	Soo Film	NEW / United Pictures	
2013	Cold Eyes	Cho Ui-seok, Kim Byung-seo		NEW / United Pictures	
2014	My Brilliant Life	E J-yong		CJ Entertainment	
2015	The Priests	Jang Jae-hyun		CJ Entertainment	
2016	Master	Cho Ui-seok		CJ Entertainment	
2018	Golden Slumber	Noh Dong-seok		CJ Entertainment	
2018	Default	Choi Kook-hee		CJ Entertainment	
2019	Crazy Romance	Kim Han-gyul		NEW	
2020	#Alive	Cho Il-hyung	Perspective Picture	Lotte Entertainment	
2022	Broker	Hirokazu Kore-eda		CJ Entertainment	
2023	The Plot	Lee Yo-seop		NEW	
2025	Dark Nuns	Kwon Hyeok-jae		NEW	

== Accolades ==
=== Awards and nominations ===
Award	Year	Category	Recipient(s)	Result	Ref.
Blue Dragon Film Awards	2022	Best Film	Broker	Nominated	
Buil Film Awards	2022	Best Film	Broker	Nominated	
Cannes Film Festival	2022	Palme d'Or	Broker	Nominated	
Cannes Film Festival	2022	Ecumenical Jury Award	Broker	Won	
Grand Bell Awards	2022	Best Film	Broker	Nominated	
Jerusalem Film Festival	2022	Best International Film	Broker	Nominated	
Korean Association of Film Critics Awards	2022	Korean Association of Film 10 selections	Broker	Won	
Munich International Film Festival	2022	Best International Film	Broker	Won	
NAACP Image Awards	2023	Outstanding International Motion Picture	Broker	Nominated	
Norwegian International Film Festival	2022	Ray of Sunshine Award	Broker	Won	
Woman Filmmaker of the Year Awards	2007	Filmmaker of the Year	Lee Yoo-jin	Won	

=== Listicle ===
Name of publisher, year listed, name of listicle, and placement
Publisher	Year	Listicle	Placement	Ref.
Cine21	2007	Women who shined in the film industry this year	Won	
K-Brand Index	2026	Female CEO category	9th	
Variety	2007	10 Film Producer to Watch	Top Ten	
