= Zip Cinema =

South Korean film production company

- Native name: 영화사 집
- Industry: Entertainment; Mass media; Production
- Founded: December 7, 2005
- Founder: Lee Yoo-jin
- Headquarters: 2nd floor, 20 Seolleung-ro 119-gil, Gangnam-gu, Nonhyeon-dong, Seoul, South Korea
- Area served: South Korea
- Key people: Lee Yoo-jin (Chief executive officer)
- Owner: Kakao Entertainment (100%)
- Parent: Kakao Entertainment
- Website: www.zipcine.com

Zip Cinema (영화사 집) is a South Korean film production company operating as a subsidiary of Kakao Entertainment. Producer Lee Yoo-jin established the company in December 2005, and its inaugural production was the 2007 film, Voice of a Murderer. The company's recent high-profile project is Hirokazu Kore-eda's Broker (2022). After its world premiere in the main competition at the 2022 Cannes Film Festival on May 26, the film garnered both the Ecumenical Jury Award and the Best Actor Award for Song Kang-ho. CJ E&M subsequently released Broker theatrically in South Korea on June 8.

== History ==
- Zip Cinema was established in December 2005 by Lee Yoo-jin.
- Zip Cinema saw a hit with rom-com All About My Wife, which took in over 4.5 million admissions and grossed more than $30.2m (KW34.1bn).
- In January 2012, Zip Cinema was acquired by Singapore based company Spackman Entertainment.
- In 2020, Spackman Entertainment received a non-binding takeover offer for its Zip Cinema subsidiary from an undisclosed Korean content production company, facilitated by Charm Accounting Corporation.
- On September 16, 2021, Zip Cinema was acquired by Kakao Entertainment.

== Filmography ==
=== Film ===
Film(s) produced by Zip Cinema
Year	Title	Director	Associated producer	Distributor	Admissions	Ref.
2007	Voice of a Murderer	Park Jin-pyo		CJ Entertainment	3,143,247	
2007	Happiness	Hur Jin-ho	Liye Film	Showbox (주)Media Plex	1,239,789	
2008	Antique	Min Kyu-dong	Soo Film	Showbox (주)Media Plex	1,181,332	
2009	Closer to Heaven	Park Jin-pyo		CJ Entertainment	2,135,509	
2009	Jeon Woo-chi: The Taoist Wizard	Choi Dong-hoon		CJ Entertainment	6,136,928	
2010	Haunters	Kim Min-suk		NEW / United Pictures	2,164,805	
2012	All About My Wife	Min Kyu-dong	Soo Film	NEW / United Pictures	4,598,985	
2013	Cold Eyes	Cho Ui-seok, Kim Byung-seo		NEW / United Pictures	5,509,019	
2014	My Brilliant Life	E J-yong		CJ Entertainment	1,624,601	
2015	The Priests	Jang Jae-hyun		CJ Entertainment	5,443,232	
2016	Master	Cho Ui-seok		CJ Entertainment	7,150,586	
2018	Golden Slumber	Noh Dong-seok		CJ Entertainment	1,387,508	
2018	Default	Choi Kook-hee		CJ Entertainment	3,755,233	
2019	Crazy Romance	Kim Han-gyul		NEW	2,924,563	
2020	#Alive	Cho Il-hyung	Perspective Picture	Lotte Entertainment	1,729,826	
2022	Broker	Hirokazu Kore-eda		CJ Entertainment	1,260,740	
2023	The Plot	Lee Yo-seop		NEW		
2025	Dark Nuns	Kwon Hyeok-jae		NEW		

=== Series ===
Key
†	Denotes television productions that have not yet been released

Series(s) produced by Zip Cinema
Year	Title	Director	Writer	Associated producer	Network	Ref.
2026	The Perfect Lie †	Cho Young-min	Baek Jae-young	Kakao Entertainment	MBC TV	
2027	My Ghostly Running Mate †	Park Shin-woo	Kwon Jong-gwan	Kakao Entertainment; Studio Dragon; Next Scene	tvN	
