= Hirofumi Nojima =

Japanese voice actor and narrator

- 野島 裕史
- Born: Yūji Nojima; Suginami, Tokyo, Japan
- Occupations: Voice actor; narrator
- Years active: 2000–present
- Agent: Aoni Production
- Father: Akio Nojima
- Relatives: Kenji Nojima (brother)

Hirofumi Nojima (野島 裕史, Nojima Hirofumi) is a Japanese voice actor and narrator from Suginami, Tokyo who is affiliated with Aoni Production. He is the son of voice actor Akio Nojima and the older brother of voice actor Kenji Nojima.

== Filmography ==
=== Anime ===
List of voice performances in anime
Year	Series	Role	Notes	Source
2000	Boogiepop Phantom	Yoji Suganuma		
2001	Millennium Actress	Voice		
2002	Overman King Gainer	Gainer Sanga		
2002	RahXephon	Mamoru Torigai		
2004	Agatha Christie no Meitantei Poirot to Marple	Hastings		
2004	Fantastic Children	Flo's father, GED Committeeman D, others		
2004	Gakuen Alice	Fukutan		
2005–08	Aria series	Akatsuki Izumo		
2005	Honey and Clover	Kazuhiko Hasegawa		
2005	The Law of Ueki	Kuroiwa		
2006	Digimon Data Squad	Tohma H. Norstein		
2006	The Wallflower	Ranmaru Morii		
2006	Utawarerumono	Hien		
2007	Death Note	Reiji Namikawa		
2007	Romeo × Juliet	Francisco		
2007	Moribito: Guardian of the Spirit	Shuga		
2005–07	Shakugan no Shana series	Hayato Ike	Also film	
2008	Inazuma Eleven	Shūuya Gōuenji		
2008	Blade of the Immortal	Kagehisa Anotsu		
2008	Macross Frontier	Yasaburo Saotome, Akira Kamijima		
2008	Scarecrowman the Animation	Scarecrowman		
2008	Toradora!	Yūsaku Kitamura		
2008	Linebarrels of Iron	Sobi Nakajima		
2008	Vampire Knight Guilty	Haruka Kuran		
2009	A Certain Scientific Railgun	Hatsuya Kaitabi		
2009	Basquash!	Jan Harris		
2009	Pandora Hearts	Elliot Nightray		
2009	Kurokami: The Animation	Yakumo		
2009	The Book of Bantorra	Enrique		
2009	Saint Seiya: The Lost Canvas	Sagittarius Sisyphus		
2009	Major	Ryōta Sawamura		
2010–12	Bakuman. series	Yūjirō Hattori		
2010	HeartCatch PreCure!	Cobraja		
2010	Heroman	Elmer Howard		
2011	Sacred Seven	Lau Hon'yu No. 0		
2012	Blast of Tempest	Junichirō Hoshimura		
2012–17	Kuroko's Basketball	Shun Izuki, Nigou		
2012	Fuse Teppō Musume no Torimonochō	Iesada Tokugawa	Film	
2013	Hunter x Hunter	Colt		
2013	The "Hentai" Prince and the Stony Cat.	Ponta		
2013	Sunday Without God	Yōki		
2013	Gingitsune	Shinichi Yoshizumi		
2013	Yowamushi Pedal	Kōtarō Ishigaki	Also second season and film	
2014	Kamigami no Asobi	Dionysus Thyrsos		
2014	HappinessCharge PreCure!	Phanphan/Phantom		
2014	World Trigger	Rinji Amatori, Kō Murakami		
2016	Show by Rock!!#	Kintaurus	Ep. 7	
2016	Trick or Alice	Nao Kurotani/Cheshire Cat	OVA	
2019	Bermuda Triangle: Colorful Pastrale	Mail Carrier Azarashi		
2019	7 Seeds	Haru Yukima		
2021	The Way of the Househusband	Shojo Otaku	ONA	
2021	Skate-Leading Stars	Hajime Ishikawa		
2021	One Piece	Who's Who		
2021	My Hero Academia: World Heroes' Mission	Allen Kay	Film	
2021	Pokémon Master Journeys: The Series	Volkner		
2022	The Eminence in Shadow	Doctor		ep. 4
2023	Demon Slayer: Kimetsu no Yaiba	Sumiyoshi		
2023	Atelier Ryza: Ever Darkness & the Secret Hideout	Empel Vollmer		
2024	Code Geass: Rozé of the Recapture	Greed		
2026	Kujima: Why Sing, When You Can Warble?	Masaomi Kōda		
2026	Magical Sisters LuluttoLilly	Umezō		
2026	The Apothecary Diaries: The Late Lady's Treasure	Bisen	Film	

=== Video games ===
List of voice performances in video games
Year	Series	Role	Notes	Source
2005	Fushigi Yūgi Genbu Kaiden Gaiden: Kagami no Miko	Takumi Mochizuki		
2009	Toradora	Yūsaku Kitamura		
2011-2012	Hanaoni video games	Reiji Takatsuki		
2012	Trick or Alice	Nao "Nyao" Kurotani/Cheshire Cat		
2013-2016	Kamigami no Asobi series	Dionysus Thyrsos		
2012-2015	Kuroko no Basuke series	Shun Izuki		
2015	World Trigger: Borderless Mission	Kō Murakami		
2016	Collar x Malice	Masanobu Mochida		
2017	Fire Emblem Heroes	Joshua		
2021	Granblue Fantasy	Ailill		
2023	Atelier Ryza 3: Alchemist of the End & the Secret Key	Empel Vollmer		

=== Tokusatsu ===
List of voice performances in tokusatsu productions
Year	Series	Role	Notes	Source
2011	Kaizoku Sentai Gokaiger	Commandant Warz Gill	Eps. 1 - 15, 17, 19, 21-22, 24 - 30, 32 - 34, 36 - 38	
2011	Kaizoku Sentai Gokaiger the Movie: The Flying Ghost Ship	Commandant Warz Gill	Film	

=== Dubbing ===
List of voice performances in live-action and overseas dubbing
Series	Role	Voice dub for	Notes	Source
The Priests	Deacon Choi	Gang Dong-won		
A Violent Prosecutor	Chi-won	Gang Dong-won		
Master	Kim Jae-myung	Gang Dong-won		
1987: When the Day Comes	Yi Han-yeol	Gang Dong-won		
Golden Slumber	Kim Gun-woo	Gang Dong-won		
Peninsula	Jeong-seok	Gang Dong-won		
Bohemian Rhapsody	Roger Taylor	Ben Hardy		
Call of Heroes	Cheung Yik	Wu Jing		
Captain America: The First Avenger	Howard Stark	Dominic Cooper		
Chip 'n Dale: Rescue Rangers	Dale	Andy Samberg		
Cruella	Jasper Badun	Joel Fry		
Entourage	Vince			
Ex Machina	Caleb Smith	Domhnall Gleeson		
The Fortress	King Injo	Park Hae-il		
Hanazakarino Kimitachihe	Minami Nanba			
Hardcore Henry	Jimmy	Sharlto Copley		
Ironheart	Joe McGillicuddy	Alden Ehrenreich		
The Last Princess	Kim Jang-han	Park Hae-il		
Meteor Garden series	Sojiro Nishikado			
Open Windows	Nick Chambers	Elijah Wood		
Premium Rush	Wilee	Joseph Gordon-Levitt		
Ratter	Michael	Matt McGorry		
Ride On	Yuanjie	Wu Jing		
Robinson Crusoe	Robinson Crusoe		Animation	
SPL II: A Time for Consequences	Chan Chi-kit	Wu Jing		
Unbroken	Lt. Russell "Phil" Phillips	Domnhall Gleeson		
Vincenzo	Vincenzo Cassano / Park Joo-hyung	Song Joong-ki		

== Discography ==
=== Drama CD ===
List of voice performances in drama audio recordings
Series	Role	Notes	Source
Hatoful Boyfriend	Kazuaki Nanaki		
Gunparade Orchestra			
Shakugan no Shana	Hayato Ike		
Toradora			
