= The Plot (film) =

2024 film by Lee Yo-sup

- Theatrical release poster
- Hangul: 설계자
- Hanja: 設計者
- Lit.: Designer
- RR: Seolgyeja
- MR: Sŏlgyeja
- Directed by: Lee Yo-sup
- Screenplay by: Lee Yo-sup
- Based on: Accident by Soi Cheang
- Produced by: Lee Yoo-jin; Oh Hyo-jin; Han Sang-hyune
- Starring: Gang Dong-won; Lee Moo-saeng; Lee Mi-sook; Kim Hong-pa; Kim Shin-rok; Lee Hyun-wook; Lee Dong-hwi; Jung Eun-chae; Tang Jun-sang
- Cinematography: Hwang Ki-suk
- Edited by: Shin Min-kyung
- Music by: Kim Tae-seong; Chung Jee-hoon
- Production company: Zip Cinema
- Distributed by: Next Entertainment World
- Release date: May 29, 2024
- Running time: 99 minutes
- Country: South Korea
- Language: Korean
- Box office: US$3.4 million

The Plot (Korean: 설계자) is a 2024 South Korean crime thriller film directed by Lee Yo-sup, starring Gang Dong-won. A remake of the 2009 Hong Kong film Accident, it tells the story of Young-il, a designer who orchestrates a commissioned murder as a perfect accidental death, and gets caught up in an unexpected incident. The film was released on May 29, 2024.

== Plot ==
Young-il is a designer who manipulates commissioned murders into accidental deaths. No one knows that the deaths that were engineered as accidents through his design are actually thoroughly planned murders. A new request comes to Young-il, who has dealt with the recent target perfectly without any evidence. The target this time is an influential figure that the media and the whole world are paying attention to. It is a dangerous mission as even the slightest gap can lead to his identity being discovered, but Young-il decides to take it on along with his teammates Jackie, Wol-cheon, and Jeom-man.

== Cast ==
- Gang Dong-won as Young-il, a designer who disguises contract killings as accidental deaths.
- Lee Moo-saeng as Lee Chi-hyeon, General Manager of Banwol Insurance who is in charge of handling accidents.
- Lee Mi-sook as Jackie, Young-il's associate and a seasoned veteran with experience.
- Lee Hyun-wook as Wol-cheon, Young-il's associate and master of disguise.
- Tang Jun-sang as Jeom-man, the timid youngest member.
- Kim Hong-pa as Joo Seong-jik, Candidate for Prosecutor General and Young-il's target.
- Jung Eun-chae as Joo Young-seon, an attorney and Young-il's client.
- Kim Shin-rok as Yang Kyeong-jin, a detective in the Accident Investigation Department at the Seoul Central Police Station.
- Lee Dong-hwi as Hauser, a cyber wrecker who creates issues.
- Lee Jong-suk as Odd Eye, a colleague who teamed up with Young-il to handle a contract murder case.
- Hyun Bong-sik as Park, target of Young-il's assassination plot.

== Production ==
=== Development ===
The previous title of the film was Accident, borrowed from the original work Accident. It was displayed along with The Hidden Face, Handsome Guys, and The Land of Happiness at the Contents Panda booth at the 2023 Asian Contents & Film Market.

The film marks the reunion of Gang Dong-won and Lee Dong-hwi after starring in the films Broker and Dr. Cheon and Lost Talisman together. This is also the third film adaptation that Gang starred in, following Golden Slumber and Illang: The Wolf Brigade.

=== Filming ===
Principal photography began in November 2021 and ended in February 2022.

== Reception ==
=== Box office ===
As of May 27, 2024, Following has grossed $1.0 million with a running total of 171,117 tickets sold.

=== Critical response ===
A review in the South China Morning Post fount the remake was "too showy for its own good". The Korea Times stated the plot was "convoluted".
