= Enes Kaya =

Turkish television personality (born 1984)

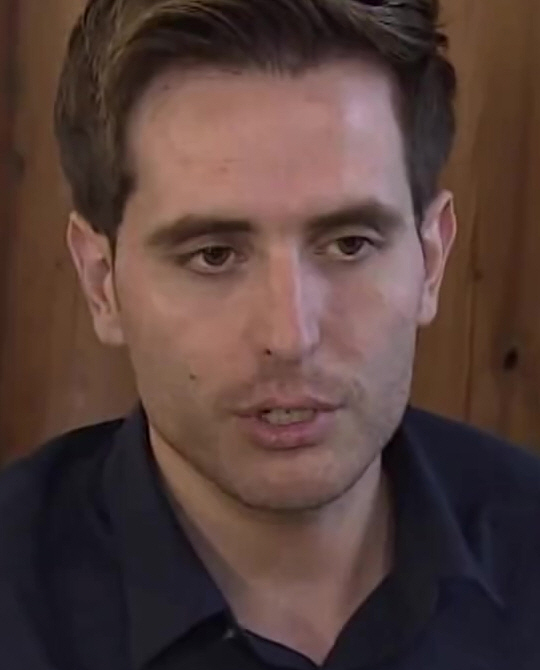
- Born: August 22, 1984 (age 42); Istanbul, Turkey
- Education: Hanyang University/ IT Management
- Occupations: Television personality, Actor, Businessman, Trade Consultant
- Years active: 2007-2015 (television personality/actor); 2015-present (businessman/trade consultant)
- Spouse: Jang Mi-Yoon (m. 2011)
- Children: Taha Kaya (Son), Mina Kaya (Daughter)
- Website: Enes Kaya on Facebook, instagram/nskorea

Enes Kaya (born August 22, 1984) is a Turkish former television personality in South Korea who currently lives and works in the country as a businessman and trade consultant. He was most known for being a cast member on the talk show Non-Summit.

== Life and career ==
In 2001 Kaya arrived in South Korea to study, at the recommendation of his father, and praised the educational system there. He spent a year studying Korean at Konkuk University, then went to study at Hanyang University with a scholarship for IT management.

In 2010, he acted in his first movie, Haunters, and then decided not to pursue a full-time acting career. He said that because of his culture and religion, he is selective about the roles he wishes to take. “In Korea, we have a good image. We’re a brother country,” he said of his homeland. "Most important part is, for me, how can I make this image better and better? Because from now on, I’m not just working for myself ― I’m working for my country.” In addition to modeling, Kaya has appeared on Arirang TV, SBS, MBC, and on KBS's Global Talk Show.

In his 2014 appearance on the talk show, Non-Summit, of the eleven male foreigners, who all speak Korean, he is considered the most conservative panelist. He was fired from all of the programs due to his adultery scandal in late 2014. In 2015, Kaya returned to acting in a supporting role for the Korean thriller Perfect Proposal.

== Filmography ==
=== Television series ===
Year	Title	Network	Notes
2007	Global Talk Show	KBS	
2007	Exclamation Mark	MBC	
2013	Vitamin	KBS	
2013	Jagiya	SBS	
2013	Hello Hello	TV Chosun	
2014	Yeo Yoo Man Man	KBS	
2014	World Changing Quiz	MBC	
2014	Saturday Night Live Korea	tvN	
2014	Non-Summit	JTBC	

=== Film ===
Year	Title	Role	Notes
2010	Haunters	Ali	
2013	Cold Eyes		
2013	Wolf, Dutch film directed by Jim Taihuttu		Production Manager
2015	Perfect Proposal	Victor	
