= Dark Nuns =

2025 film by Kwon Hyeok-jae

- Theatrical release poster
- Hangul: 검은 수녀들
- Hanja: 검은 修女들
- Lit.: Black Nuns
- RR: Geomeun sunyeodeul
- MR: Kŏmŭn sunyŏdŭl
- Directed by: Kwon Hyeok-jae
- Written by: Kim Woo-jin
- Produced by: Lee Yoo-jin; Oh Hyo-jin
- Starring: Song Hye-kyo; Jeon Yeo-been; Lee Jin-wook; Moon Woo-jin
- Cinematography: Choi Chan-min
- Edited by: Shin Min-kyung
- Music by: Kim Tae-seong
- Production company: Zip Cinema
- Distributed by: Next Entertainment World
- Release date: January 24, 2025
- Running time: 114 minutes
- Country: South Korea
- Language: Korean
- Box office: US$12 million

Dark Nuns (Korean: 검은 수녀들; also known as The Priest 2: Dark Nuns) is a 2025 South Korean supernatural thriller film directed by Kwon Hyeok-jae, and starring Song Hye-kyo, Jeon Yeo-been, Lee Jin-wook, and Moon Woo-jin. The film is a spin-off of the 2015 film The Priests by Jang Jae-hyun, and it follows the two nuns who work together to save a boy who has been possessed by an evil spirit. It was released on January 24, 2025.

== Plot ==
Sister Junia, a nun known for her strict faith and experience with spiritual crises, becomes involved in the case of Hee-joon, a young boy who exhibits signs of severe demonic possession. The Church initially delays intervention, questioning the nature of the possession and the risks involved. As the Hee-joon's condition worsens, Sister Junia takes responsibility for overseeing his care.

She is joined by Sister Michaela, a younger nun who is more pragmatic and skeptical of supernatural explanations. Despite their differences, the two work together to investigate the source of the possession. Their inquiry leads them to uncover suppressed records of previous exorcisms and forbidden rituals that were deliberately hidden by Church authorities.

As unauthorized rites are performed, the entity possessing Hee-joon grows increasingly violent, placing both nuns in danger. The case forces them to confront their personal doubts, guilt, and the limits of their faith. The situation escalates into a final confrontation in which sacrifice becomes unavoidable, and the boundaries between faith, sin, and redemption are tested.

== Cast ==
- Song Hye-kyo as Sister Junia, a nun who is determined to save Hee-joon from his pain
- Jeon Yeo-been as Sister Michaela, a fellow nun who decides to help Sister Junia after being intrigued by her
- Lee Jin-wook as Father Paolo, a priest and psychiatrist who believes that Hee-joon can be cured medically
- Moon Woo-jin as Hee-joon, a young boy who was possessed by a powerful evil spirit
- Huh Joon-ho as Father Andrea, a priest who performs a ritual to save Hee-joon
- Kim Gook-hee as Hyo-won, a shaman who helped Junia exorcise demons
- Shin Jae-hwi as Ae-dong, Hyo-won's disciple
- Gang Dong-won as Deacon Choi

== Production ==
=== Development ===
The film was announced as a spin-off of the 2015 film The Priests which directed and written by Jang Jae-hyun. It is directed by Kwon Hyeok-jae, who worked on the films Troubleshooter (2010) and Count (2023), produced by the film company Zip Cinema, and distributed by Next Entertainment World.

=== Casting ===
On November 13, 2023, Song Hye-kyo announced that she was in talks to star in the film, while Jeon Yeo-been was cast the same day. On February 14, 2024, Lee Jin-wook was reportedly considering joining the film. Two days later, Moon Woo-jin joined the film as his next work. On the same day, the cast line-up—Song, Jeon, Lee, Moon, and Huh Joon-ho—were revealed.

=== Filming ===
Principal photography were reportedly scheduled to begin in the first half of 2024. It was confirmed that the filming would last for three months from February 22, to May 25, 2024.

== Release ==
Next Entertainment World announced that Dark Nuns was scheduled to be released in local theaters on January 24, 2025.

According to distributor Next Entertainment World, on the 17th of January, Dark Nuns was pre-sold in 160 countries overseas, confirming simultaneous overseas releases one after another, starting with Indonesia, Taiwan, and Mongolia on the 24th, followed by the Philippines on the 29th, Australia, New Zealand, Thailand, and Laos on February 6, U.S and Canada on February 7th, Singapore and Malaysia on February 13, and Vietnam on February 21st.

== Reception ==
=== Box office ===
The film released on January 24, 2025, alongside Hitman 2 and earned $4 million on its first week.

=== Accolades ===
Award ceremony	Year	Category	Nominee	Result	Ref.
Baeksang Arts Awards	2025	Best Actress	Song Hye-kyo	Nominated	
Baeksang Arts Awards	2025	Best Supporting Actress	Jeon Yeo-been	Nominated	
Baeksang Arts Awards	2025	Best New Actor	Moon Woo-jin	Nominated	
Blue Dragon Film Awards	2025	Best Actress	Song Hye-kyo	Nominated	
Blue Dragon Film Awards	2025	Best Supporting Actress	Jeon Yeo-been	Nominated	
Buil Film Awards	2025	Best Supporting Actress	Jeon Yeo-been	Nominated	
Buil Film Awards	2025	Best New Actor	Moon Woo-jin	Nominated	
Golden Cinematography Awards	2025	Best Actress	Jeon Yeo-been	Won	

== See also ==
- List of 2025 box office number-one films in South Korea
