= Perfect Proposal =

- Theatrical poster
- Directed by: Yoon Jae-gu
- Written by: Yoon Jae-gu
- Based on: La Femme de paille by Catherine Arley
- Produced by: Min Jin-su
- Starring: Im Soo-jung; Yoo Yeon-seok
- Cinematography: Lee Tae-yoon
- Edited by: Lee Jin
- Music by: Shim Hyun-jung
- Production companies: Soo Film; Bidangil Pictures
- Distributed by: CJ Entertainment
- Release date: June 4, 2015
- Running time: 110 minutes
- Country: South Korea
- Languages: Korean; English; Cantonese
- Budget: ₩5 billion
- Box office: ₩1.13 billion (US$1 million)

Perfect Proposal (Korean: 은밀한 유혹; RR: Eunmilhan yuhok; lit. 'Secret Temptation') is a 2015 South Korean romantic thriller film written and directed by Yoon Jae-gu, based on the novel La Femme de paille ("Woman of Straw") by Catherine Arley.

== Plot ==
Yoo Ji-yeon is a Korean university graduate who is stuck working as a waiter under the name "Jenny Yoo" in a Macanese bar after her colleague stole her credit card and all of her money before running away, forcing her to pay her increasingly rising debt. Her Macanese friend offers her a job interview with Kim Sung-yeol, the illegitimate son of Kim Seok-gu, a successful gambling corporation chairman who owns half of the casinos in Macau. Sung-yeol asks Ji-yeon to become Seok-gu's new bride, so she can inherit his property and divide it for the two of them. Sung-yeol is unable to inherit his property due to his status. Seok-gu has become grumpy since his family's deaths years ago.

Ji-yeon reluctantly learns manners resembling Seok-gu's late wife to better her chance in attracting the old man. Arriving at his yacht, Ji-yeon becomes a part of Seok-gu's attendants that include the Korean ship captain and maid Ji Yoo-mi who takes care of Seok-gu's pet chihuahua, the Russian Viktor, and the Pakistani Khan. Having to endure Seok-gu's constant lashing, criticism, and various other rhetoric, Ji-yeon nevertheless is able to stand up and change him into a less irascible person, even managing to make him play the piano again, an activity that used to be his hobby until his family's demise. Seok-gu in turn reveals about his past as a "circus" player in Macau, his reasons for using the whistle and constantly shouting, and also mentions a woman who helped him achieve his success.

Ji-yeon though is dispirited one night and searches solace in Sung-yeol, with whom she has fallen in love. Khan, however, sneaks on their conversations and begins to keep a watchful eye on the two. The other night, Ji-yeon has had enough and tries to leave, all while stating her discomfort of having to live for 10 years with Seok-gu even if the plan did work, in front of Sung-yeol. To her surprise, Seok-gu proposes to her the next day and has apparently modified his will to include her name. He states to Sung-yeol before the reception that he ignored him as he possesses "90% work, but not 10% luck" and thus not fit to inherit the casinos. At the wedding reception, Seok-gu nicknames Ji-yeon "Cinderella".

However, Ji-yeon discovers to her horror that Seok-gu has died the night after the reception. Sung-yeol tells her that they have to act normal until their arrival to Busan, followed by delivering Seok-gu's body to his home until Sung-yeol can sign his father's modified will that includes Ji-yeon's inheritance. Ji-yeon tries hard to keep the act in front of Seok-gu's personal assistant, Jang Hye-jin, who is beginning to suspect something. Eventually, she is caught by the police and accused as the murderer. She learns that Sung-yeol has prepared to inherit 10% of the estate since five years ago, with 90% of them donated for charity due to the South Korean inheritance law; Sung-yeol has been using her since the beginning so he could not only inherit the business but also to avenge his mother's abandonment by Seok-gu. Escorted to the prison, Ji-yeon sees Khan unsuccessfully trying to reach her and shouting "Camera!".

While scanning the identification papers, Ji-yeon realizes that the woman mentioned by Seok-gu is Hye-jin. Using Seok-gu's wording, Hye-jin frees Ji-yeon into probation so she can attend Seok-gu's funeral. There, Ji-yeon attempts to reach Khan, only to be apprehended, and from the crime scene photos further realizes that Seok-gu's chihuahua has been fitted with a camera that also recorded Seok-gu's real murderer: Sung-yeol. Khan is the only one knowing this, but Sung-yeol kills him to silence him. The chihuahua is currently carried by Yoo-mi, who is hunted by Sung-yeol. Ji-yeon manages to reach their rendezvous place and after a struggle, is able to get the camera and knocks down Sung-yeol with Yoo-mi's help.

Sung-yeol is arrested for the murders while Ji-yeon's inheritance as Seok-gu's wife is realized, making her the new owner of the Macanese casinos. Ji-yeon visits Sung-yeol at the prison to hear his reasons and that he never loved her. Just before she leaves, Sung-yeol tells her that he is the one who made her "Cinderella": Ji-yeon gives a smile.

== Cast ==
- Im Soo-jung as Ji-yeon
- Yoo Yeon-seok as Sung-yeol
- Lee Geung-young as Chairman Kim Seok-goo
- Park Chul-min as Yacht captain Sun-jang
- Jin Kyung as Jang Hye-jin
- Min Do-hee as Yoo-mi
- Enes Kaya as Victor
- Mahbub Alam as Khan
- Lee Jong-woo as Chang-gi
- Shin Yong-hoon as Detective Oh
- Cho Yoon-woo as Jin-sub
- Im Dae-il as Lawyer Oh
- Sung Min-soo as Lawyer Lee Jang-yeol
- Sodany Soy as Interview Applicant
- Dean Dawson as Landlord
- Jeff Johnson as Sailor

== Box office ==
Perfect Proposal was released on 4 June 2015 and it opened at fourth place in the box office, earning ₩760 million (US$676,000) from 95,700 admissions in its first four days. So far, it has grossed ₩1,135,684,747 from 145,244 admissions.
