= You Are My Sunshine (2005 film) =

- Theatrical release poster
- Hangul: 너는 내 운명
- Hanja: 너는 내 運命
- RR: Neoneun nae unmyeong
- MR: Nŏnŭn nae unmyŏng
- Directed by: Park Jin-pyo
- Written by: Park Jin-pyo
- Produced by: Oh Jeong-wan
- Starring: Jeon Do-yeon; Hwang Jung-min
- Cinematography: Seong Seung-taek
- Edited by: Moon In-dae
- Music by: Bang Jun-seok
- Distributed by: CJ Entertainment
- Release date: 23 September 2005 (South Korea)
- Running time: 121 minutes
- Country: South Korea
- Language: Korean
- Box office: US$17.5 million

You Are My Sunshine (Korean: 너는 내 운명; RR: Neoneun nae unmyeong; lit. 'You are my destiny') is a 2005 South Korean romantic drama film written and directed by Park Jin-pyo, and starring Jeon Do-yeon and Hwang Jung-min. It was released in Korea on 23 September 2005.

The official English title is named after the Jimmie Davis song "You Are My Sunshine," which is used on the soundtrack.

== Plot ==
Seok-joong, a farmer in his mid thirties, is desperate to find a wife and settle down. After backing out of a scheme to set him up with a Filipino bride, he falls head over heels in love with a local dabang delivery girl, Eun-ha, and starts showering her with gifts. Although Eun-ha is initially unimpressed, she is eventually won over by his kindhearted nature, and the two get married. The couple's marital bliss is short lived, however, as Eun-ha tests positive for HIV/AIDS, and is then tracked down by her abusive ex-husband, which forces her to run away and fall back into prostitution.

== Cast ==
- Jeon Do-yeon as Eun-ha
- Hwang Jung-min as Seok-joong
- Na Moon-hee as Seok-joong's mother
- Ryu Seung-soo as Chul-kyu
- Seo Joo-hee as Kyu-ri
- Jeong Yu-seok as Chun-soo
- Yoon Je-moon as Jae-ho
- Go Soo-hee as Hwang Yu-sun
- Kim Sang-ho as Kim Kyung-bae
- Moon Won-joo as Mr. Gook
- Kim Boo-seon as Kim Yeo-in

== Reception ==
You Are My Sunshine was the ninth most successful domestic film of the year, selling 3,051,134 tickets nationwide, and grossing US$17,530,124. It also became the best-selling Korean melodrama film of all time, before its record was surpassed by Maundy Thursday a year later.

== Awards and nominations ==
2005 Chunsa Film Art Awards

- Best Actress - Jeon Do-yeon

2005 Busan Film Critics Awards

- Best Supporting Actress - Na Moon-hee

2005 Blue Dragon Film Awards

- Best Director - Park Jin-pyo
- Best Actor - Hwang Jung-min
- Nomination - Best Film
- Nomination - Best Actress - Jeon Do-yeon
- Nomination - Best Supporting Actress - Na Moon-hee
- Nomination - Best Screenplay - Park Jin-pyo
- Nomination - Best Music - Bang Jun-seok

2005 Korean Film Awards

- Best Actor - Hwang Jung-min
- Best Actress - Jeon Do-yeon
- Nomination - Best Film
- Nomination - Best Director - Park Jin-pyo
- Nomination - Best Supporting Actress - Na Moon-hee

2006 Baeksang Arts Awards

- Nomination - Best Director - Park Jin-pyo
- Nomination - Best Actor - Hwang Jung-min
- Nomination - Best Actress - Jeon Do-yeon

2006 Grand Bell Awards

- Best Actress - Jeon Do-yeon
- Nomination - Best Film
- Nomination - Best Director - Park Jin-pyo
- Nomination - Best Actor - Hwang Jung-min
- Nomination - Best Supporting Actress - Na Moon-hee

== See also ==
- Ticket Dabang
