= Jin Kyung =

South Korean actress (born 1972)

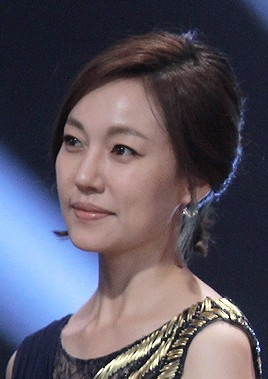
- Jin in 2014
- Born: March 27, 1972 (age 54); Masan, South Gyeongsang, South Korea
- Education: Korea National University of Arts
- Occupation: Actress
- Years active: 1998–present
- Agent: AER Entertainment

Korean name
- Hangul: 진경
- RR: Jin Gyeong
- MR: Chin Kyŏng

Jin Kyung (Korean: 진경; born March 27, 1972) is a South Korean actress.

== Early years ==
Jin learned piano as a child. She graduated from Seonhwa Arts Middle School, and entered Daewon Foreign Language High School. Her interest at acting started when Jin watched a play she attended with her older sister, who is active in Seoul Institute of the Arts' Dramatic Arts Research Club. She dropped out of the university within a week, and the following year entered Dongguk University's Department of Theater and Film.

== Career ==
Jin made her stage debut in 1998 and spent ten years in theater, before becoming active in film and television. She won Best Supporting Actress at the 50th Baeksang Arts Awards for surveillance thriller Cold Eyes (2013).

In November 2020, Jin signed with new agency YG Entertainment.

She won "Best Supporting Actress" at 28th SBS Drama Awards as Oh Myung Sim in the drama series Dr. Romantic 2.

In May 2025, after YG Entertainment announced it would end its actor management division, Jin signed an exclusive contract with AER Entertainment, a subsidiary of Story J Company.

== Filmography ==
=== Film ===
Year	Title	Role	Notes	Ref.
2000	Sugar Hill		Short film	
2000	Virgin Stripped Bare by Her Bachelors			
2001	I Wish I Had a Wife			
2001	Go West		Short film	
2001	Paradise Villa	Woman with water purifier		
2004	Too Beautiful to Lie	Joo Young-ok		
2004	A Smile	Writer Ahn		
2004	My Little Bride	Newlywed woman		
2005	The Bayer Piano Lesson for Children Vol. 1	Piano teacher	Short film	
2006	Forbidden Quest	Yoon-seo's wife		
2006	Love Phobia	Female teacher		
2008	The Room Nearby	Teacher Park		
2009	The Case of Itaewon Homicide	Prosecutor Park's wife		
2009	Fly, Penguin	Kwon Soo-min		
2009	Where Are You Going?	Homeroom teacher		
2010	Happy Killers	Mi-young		
2011	Glove	Nun teacher		
2011	Hanji	Female section chief		
2011	Head	Female nurse		
2011	A Reason to Live			
2012	Unbowed	Park Jun's wife		
2012	Hoya (Eighteen, Nineteen)	Homeroom teacher	Cameo appearance	
2012	Miss Conspirator	Miss Go	Cameo appearance	
2013	My Paparotti	Mi-sun		
2013	Cold Eyes	Department head Lee		
2014	Slow Video	Old maid Shim		
2015	Perfect Proposal	Hye-jin		
2015	Veteran	Joo-yeon		
2015	Assassination	Ahn Seong-sim		
2015	You Call It Passion	CEO Jang		
2016	The Great Actor	Ji-young		
2016	Master	Kim Mi-yong		
2018	Love+Sling	Mi-ra		
2018	The Witness	Soo-jin		
2020	Beasts Clawing at Straws	Young-sun		
2021	Hard Hit	Team leader of the explosives disposal team		
2022	Yaksha: Ruthless Operations	Yeom Jeong-won	Netflix film	
2022	The Boys	Yoon Mi-sook	Premiere at BIFF	
2025	Midnight Sun	Kyung-sun		

=== Television series ===
Key
†	Denotes television productions that have not yet been released

Year	Title	Role	Notes	Ref.
2008	Iljimae	Bong Soon's mother	Cameo appearance	
2011	War of the Roses	Kim Nan-jung		
2012	My Husband Got a Family	Min Ji-young		
2012	Phantom	Oh Yeon-sook	Cameo appearance	
2012	The Innocent Man	Hyun Jung-hwa		
2012	Cheer Up, Mr. Kim!	Jo Jae-nam		
2013	Gu Family Book	Yeo-joo		
2013	The Queen's Classroom	Jung Hwa-shin		
2013	Good Doctor	Nam Joo-yeon		
2013	Basketball	Woman from Bamsil		
2013	KBS Drama Special: "Outlasting Happiness"	Jin-kyung	One act-drama	
2014	Wonderful Days	Cha Hae-joo		
2014	It's Okay, That's Love	Lee Young-jin		
2014	Tears of Heaven	Adoptive mother	Cameo appearance	
2014	KBS Drama Special: "The Girl Who Became a Photo"	Seo Ji-eun	One act-drama	
2014	Pinocchio	Song Cha-ok		
2015	Blood	Choi Kyung-in		
2015	The Time We Were Not in Love	Choi Mi-hyang		
2015	Oh My Venus	Choi Hye-ran		
2016	Uncontrollably Fond	Shin Young-ok		
2016	Local Hero	Sun-young		
2016	Woman with a Suitcase	Goo Ji-Hyun		
2016	Dr. Romantic	Oh Myeong-shim	Season 1–3	
2017	Untouchable	Jung Yoon-mi		
2018	My Only One	Na Hong-joo		
2020	Homemade Love Story	Jung Min-jae		
2021	L.U.C.A.: The Beginning	Hwang Jung-ah		
2021	Melancholia	Noh Jung-ah		
2022	Extraordinary Attorney Woo	Tae Soo-mi		
2022	Love in Contract	Yoo Mi-ho		
2023	My Lovely Liar	Cha Hyang-suk		
2023	Queenmaker	Seo Min-jeong		
2023	Black Knight	President Chae Jin-gyeong		
2023	The Story of Park's Marriage Contract	Min Hye-sook		
2026	Spring Fever	Seo Hye-sook		
2026	Notes from the Last Row	Jo Hyeon-suk		
2026	One-of-a-Kind Romance †	Yu-il's mother	Cameo appearance	

== Theater ==
Year	Title	Role	Reprised
1998	Secret Royal Inspector Park Mun-su	Park Mun-su	
1998	Fish Origami		
1998	Kiss		
1998	The Broken Jug		
1999	Sotong and Bultong		
1999	The Caucasian Chalk Circle		
2000	싸움터의 산책		
2000	Yi	Jang Nok-su	2001, 2006, 2009, 2010
2002	Stop It		
2002	Caligula No. 1237		
2003	Conditions for Being a Villain		
2003	Generation After Generation		
2003	Come and See Me	Reporter Park	2006
2005	Wit		
2005	Art in June		
2005	Art	Soo-yeon	
	Boy's Life		
2007	Reflection		
2007	8 Femmes	Louise	
2007	Oresteia	Cassandra	
2008	The Tenant		
2008	An Exploration of the Mind		
2009	Turn Around and Leave	Chae Hee-ju	
2010	Closer	Anna	
2010	The Phantom of the Curtain Call	Marie	
2011	Cooking with Elvis	Mam	
2013	이제는 애처가	Sakura	

== Accolades ==
=== Awards and nominations ===
Year	Award	Category	Nominated work	Result
2012	KBS Drama Awards	Best Supporting Actress	My Husband Got a Family, The Innocent Man	Nominated
2013	22nd Buil Film Awards	Best Supporting Actress	Cold Eyes	Nominated
2013	KBS Drama Awards	Best Supporting Actress	Good Doctor	Nominated
2014	50th Baeksang Arts Awards	Best Supporting Actress	Cold Eyes	Won
2014	SBS Drama Awards	Special Award, Actress in a Miniseries	It's Okay, That's Love, Pinocchio	Won
2014	KBS Drama Awards	Best Supporting Actress	Wonderful Days, The Girl Who Became a Photo	Nominated
2015	36th Blue Dragon Film Awards	Best Supporting Actress	Veteran	Nominated
2016	11th Max Movie Awards	Best Supporting Actress	Veteran	Nominated
2016	SBS Drama Awards	Excellence Award, Actress in a Genre Drama	Dr. Romantic	Nominated
2018	KBS Drama Awards	Best Supporting Actress	My Only One	Nominated
2018	KBS Drama Awards	Best Couple (with Choi Soo-jong)	My Only One	Won
2019	39th Golden Cinema Film Festival	Jury's Special Award	—N/a	Won
2020	28th SBS Drama Awards	Best Supporting Actress	Dr. Romantic 2	Won
2023	SBS Drama Awards	Best Supporting Actress in a Seasonal Drama	Dr. Romantic 3	Nominated

=== Listicles ===
Name of publisher, year listed, name of listicle, and placement
Publisher	Year	Listicle	Placement	Ref.
Korean Film Council	2021	Korean Actors 200 (Note: Introduces 200 actors that best represent the present and future of Korean cinema to the people in the film industry all over the world)	Included	
