= Voice of a Murderer =

- Voice of a Murderer poster
- Hangul: 그놈 목소리
- RR: Geunom moksori
- MR: Kŭnom moksori
- Directed by: Park Jin-pyo
- Written by: Park Jin-pyo
- Produced by: Lee Yoo-jin
- Starring: Sul Kyung-gu; Kim Nam-joo; Kim Yeong-cheol; Gang Dong-won
- Cinematography: Kim Woo-hyung
- Edited by: Kim Mi-joo
- Music by: Lee Byung-woo
- Production company: Zip Cinema
- Distributed by: CJ Entertainment
- Release date: February 1, 2007 (South Korea)
- Running time: 122 minutes
- Language: Korean
- Budget: US$4.5 million
- Box office: US$18,160,598

Voice of a Murderer (Korean: 그놈 목소리; RR: Geunom moksori; lit. 'His Voice') is a 2007 South Korean crime thriller film written and directed by Park Jin-pyo, starring Sul Kyung-gu, Kim Nam-joo, Kim Yeong-cheol and Gang Dong-won. It was the third top-grossing domestic film of 2007, with 3,143,247 tickets sold. The story is a fictionalized account of the real-life kidnapping case of 9-year-old Lee Hyung-ho in 1991.

== Plot ==
One day, the 9-year-old son of famous and successful South Korean news anchor Han Kyung-bae, Sang-woo, disappears without a trace. Later, Kyung-bae receives a phone call from an anonymous person demanding 100,000 dollars as ransom in exchange for the boy's life. The exchange does not happen after the boy's mother Oh Ji-sun gets the police involved.

The police assign detective Kim Wook-jung to the case and assembles a secret investigative task force and forensics team. The kidnapper, sometimes referred to as the "Bastard's Voice", however, seems to be smarter than any of the detectives assigned to the case: He knows not to stay on the phone too long and keeps changing locations for exchanges. Not to mention, his emotionless voice suggests a possibility of him being confident he won't get caught. An example of his cunning is seen when in one potential chance to arrest the kidnapper who gets away with the money, Kim who was hidden in the trunk of Kyung-bae's car, is kidnapped and tortured by the kidnapper and made a mockery of when he is left somewhere naked. As time goes by, the boy's parents become restless and angry as the kidnapper continually taunts them through phone calls as he mocks them as he demands ransom. The police have a number of suspects including Kyung-bae's former best friend Lee Jae-joon who has a grudge on the former for getting him sent to prison, but he has an air tight alibi.

Kyung-bae receives another call to ask if has gotten his car back and allows Kyung-bae to hear his son's voice, convincing Kyung-bae that Sang-woo is still alive. However, the kidnapper is fed up with Kyung-bae's increasingly hostile tone with him, he demands that Ji-sun come meet him at a disclosed location in order to get her son back alive. Upon arriving, she finds instructions to pay 100 grand to an account belonging to an alias but during the stressful ordeal faints.

Detectives and Kyung-bae still believing Lee Jae-joon is the kidnapper continue to investigate and interrogate him further until they find he is not. Then, an investigator specializing in audio forensics reveals that one proof of life, the boy begging for his life over the phone is a tape recording. This results in the police suggesting to Kyung-bae they make the case public. The kidnapper once again calls to demand another 100 grand put on a specified location in Lotte World. Kyung-bae decides to be done with the agonizing experience and follows the kidnapper's instructions and puts the money for the kidnapper to retrieve it, only to find his son is not present in the promised location.

Upon the 44th day of Sang-woo's kidnapping, police find the young boy's lifeless body near the Han River park. Soon, Kyung-bae returns to his anchor chair to report on his own story and pleads with the public to help him catch Sang-woo's murderer before playing a recording of the murderer's voice for the audience to hear.

== Cast ==
- Sul Kyung-gu as Han Kyung-bae
- Kim Nam-joo as Oh Ji-sun
- Kim Yeong-cheol as Inspector Kim Wook-jung
- Gang Dong-won as Kidnapper
- Song Young-chang as Captain Noh
- Go Soo-hee as Inspector Cha Soo-hee
- Kim Kwang-kyu as Police Captain
- Choi Jung-yoon as Anchorwoman Ha Joo-won
- Na Moon-hee as Kyung-bae's mother
- Yoon Je-moon as Priest
- Park Jin-woo as Inspector Park
- Kim Ik-tae as Chief of police
- Jang Won-young as Dr. Choi
- Lee Hyung-chul as Han Sang-woo
- Jeon Hye-jin as Lee Ae-sook
- Im Jong-yoon as Lee Jae-joon
- Jo Seok-hyun as Inspector Jo
- Kim Young-pil as Han In-seok

== Background ==
The film is based on the real-life abduction of nine-year-old Lee Hyung-ho on January 29, 1991. Despite 87 ransom calls from the kidnapper to the child's parents asking for ₩70 million (US$75,000), Lee's dead body was found in a ditch near his home in Apgujeong-dong 44 days after he went missing; he had been killed two days after being kidnapped. The killer was never caught, and the 15-year statute of limitations on the case expired in 2006.

== Awards and nominations ==
2007 Grand Bell Awards

- Nomination – Best Actor – Sul Kyung-gu

2007 Blue Dragon Film Awards

- Nomination – Best Film
- Nomination – Best Director – Park Jin-pyo
- Nomination – Best Actor – Sul Kyung-gu

2007 Korean Film Awards

- Nomination – Best Sound – Kim Suk-won, Kim Chang-seop
