= My Brilliant Life =

- Theatrical release poster
- Hangul: 두근두근 내 인생
- Hanja: 두근두근 내 人生
- RR: Dugeundugeun nae insaeng
- MR: Tugŭndugŭn nae insaeng
- Directed by: E J-yong
- Written by: Choi Min-seok; E J-yong; Oh Hyo-jin
- Based on: My Palpitating Life by Kim Ae-ran
- Produced by: Lee Yoo-jin
- Starring: Gang Dong-won; Song Hye-kyo; Jo Sung-mok; Baek Il-seob
- Cinematography: Lee Jae-hyeok
- Edited by: Kim Chang-ju
- Music by: Jung Jae-hyung
- Production company: Zip Cinema
- Distributed by: CJ Entertainment
- Release date: September 3, 2014 (South Korea)
- Running time: 110 minutes
- Country: South Korea
- Language: Korean
- Box office: US$11.7 million

My Brilliant Life (Korean: 두근두근 내 인생; lit. 'My Palpitating Life') is a 2014 South Korean drama film starring Gang Dong-won and Song Hye-kyo. It was co-written and directed by E J-yong based on the 2011 novel My Palpitating Life by Kim Ae-ran. The film was released under CJ Entertainment in Korea on September 3, 2014, followed by an official wide release in China on March 13, 2015.

My Brilliant Life won the Third Place Audience Award at the 17th Udine Far East Film Festival in 2015.

== Plot ==
Immature and clumsy Dae-soo and beautiful but foul-mouthed Mi-ra were both seventeen-year-old teenagers when Mi-ra became pregnant. As a result of familial rejection, Dae-soo decides to run away from home and care for his family on his own. Their son Ah-reum was born, but he was diagnosed with the extremely rare genetic disorder progeria, which makes its recipient age prematurely and rapidly.

Years later, Ah-reum is sixteen, but his body is that of an eighty-year-old man. The family faces the fact that he may not live to see his 18th birthday. Sensing that he doesn't have much time left, Ah-reum writes a story about how his young parents fell in love and how he came to be, hoping to give it as a gift to them on his seventeenth birthday. At the same time, Dae-soo and Mi-ra struggle to raise money for Ah-reum's hospital expenses and accept the reality that their son will not be with them much longer. To cover costs, Dae-soo takes up work as a taxi-driver and Mi-ra works at a laundry. Dae-soo struggles to balance work and spending limited time with his son.

Hearing the story of Ah-reum, a television crew searches for the family to make a documentary program about Ah-reum and his condition. After the documentary is screened, Ah-reum begins to receive emails from another child who is sick, a young girl whose messages comfort him and provide hope as he tries to recount the love story of his parents as his final gift to them.

== Cast ==
- Gang Dong-won as Dae-soo
- Song Hye-kyo as Mi-ra
- Jo Sung-mok as Ah-reum
  - Cha Eun-woo as Healthy Ah-reum (credited as "Lee Dong-min")
- Baek Il-seob as Mr. Jang
- Heo Joon-seok as Seung-chan
- Chae Seo-jin as Lee Seo-ha
- Kim So-jin as Writer Kim
- Oh Hee-joon as Mi-ra's older brother
- Lee Sung-min as Family doctor
- Kim Kap-soo as Dae-soo's father
- Kim In-tae as Older Mr. Jang
- Taetiseo as Dae-soo's favorite girl group

== Development and Production ==
My Brilliant Life marks director E J-yong's return to commercial filmmaking after spending previous years focusing on low budget experimental works such as Actresses (2009) and Behind the Camera (2013). In a 2014 interview with South China Morning Post, actors Song Hye-kyo and Gang Dong-won spoke about their personal acting backgrounds and their interest in director E J-yong's personal career up to the film. About their decisions to sign on to My Brilliant Life, they stated that the script "read as more restrained, but nevertheless thought-provoking on the subjects of family and loss."

Principal photography began in 2013. Early on in production, director E J-yong recognized the need for advanced makeup techniques and special effects to age Jo Sung-mok, the child actor for Ah-Reum. After months of research on costume makeup and its practitioners, Director Lee flew his makeup crew to Hollywood to study under special effects makeup artist Greg Cannom, whose work on films such as Fan (2016) and Bicentennial Man (1999) has earned him nine Academy Award nominations and three wins. After training in aging techniques and collaborating with Cannom to construct a detailed makeup process for the character of Ah-reum, the makeup crew returned to Korea to begin initial filming. On the collaboration with Greg Cannom and the film's usage of special effects makeup, Director E J-yong stated that, "the film could stand its ground against Hollywood flicks."

To prepare for the later scenes of the aged Ah-reum, Jo Sung-mok underwent a daily 5-hour long makeup process to create wrinkles and age spots. The techniques used by the makeup artists was adapted from those used in the award-winning U.S. film, The Curious Case of Benjamin Button, on which Greg Cannom served as head of the makeup department.

== Release ==
=== Domestic Release ===
My Brilliant Life was released under CJ Entertainment in Korea on September 3, 2014.

=== International Release ===
The film obtained a release contract with Beijing Culture Media in 2014. Spackman, the investment group which the film's production company Zip Cinema is under, declined to clarify whether Chinese distribution would be treated as an import or revenue-sharing quota release when asked by reporters. My Brilliant Life received official wide release in China on March 13, 2015. It was distributed by China Film Group, the largest state-owned film enterprise in China at the time. It opened on approximately 5,000 screens throughout the country.

In Japan, Twin Co. acquired the film for mass distribution.

== Reception ==
=== Box office ===
As of October 2018, the film has been screened on 629 screens, with admission of 1,624,601 and a gross of US$10,799,650, approximately 12.3 billion won, in South Korean box offices. The demographics of male viewers and parents showed an especially strong response to the drama.

For general audience response, My Brilliant Life came in third in its opening weekend, following the highly-popular gambling saga installment Tazza 2 (2014) and English-language French science fiction thriller film Lucy (2014). The film grossed a total of $7.89 million in its first three weekends.

=== Film Festivals ===
In 2014, My Brilliant Life was invited to be screened at the 2015 Far East Film Festival in Udine, Italy as the selected representative for South Korea. The festival was held from April 23 to May 2 and was the European premiere of the film. The film was also selected to be screened at the 34th Hawaii International Film Festival in 2014 as part of the event's program, "Spotlight on Korea". From October 30 to November 9, the film was showcased in Oahu. From November 13 to November 16, showcases were held in Kauai and Big Island.

In 2015, the 5th Annual San Diego Asian Film Festival Spring Showcase showed My Brilliant Life as part of its presentation of the Pacific Arts Movement. From April 16 to April 25, the film was screened as the official selection and the screenings represented the West Coast Premiere of My Brilliant Life.

In June 2018, the film was screened at the London Korean Film Festival.

=== Accolades ===
Year	Award	Category	Recipient(s) and nominee(s)	Result	Reference
2015	Udine Far East Festival	Audience Award	My Brilliant Life	3rd place	

== See also ==
- Jack (1996 American film)
- Paa (2009 Indian film)
