= Jeon Woo-chi: The Taoist Wizard =

- Film poster
- Hangul: 전우치
- Hanja: 田禹治
- RR: Jeon Uchi
- MR: Chŏn Uch'i
- Directed by: Choi Dong-hoon
- Written by: Choi Dong-hoon
- Produced by: Eugene Lee; Katherine Kim; Lee Tae-hun
- Starring: Gang Dong-won; Kim Yoon-seok; Im Soo-jung; Yoo Hae-jin
- Cinematography: Choi Young-hwan
- Edited by: Shin Min-kyung
- Music by: Jang Young-gyu
- Distributed by: CJ Entertainment
- Release date: 23 December 2009
- Running time: 119 minutes
- Country: South Korea
- Language: Korean
- Budget: US$12 million
- Box office: US$38.7 million

Jeon Woo-chi: The Taoist Wizard (Korean: 전우치; also known as Woochi: The Demon Slayer, is a 2009 South Korean fantasy action comedy film written and directed by Choi Dong-hoon. The film is a departure from his popular heist films Tazza: The High Rollers and The Big Swindle as a big-budget, special effects-filled action romp. Nonetheless, it was equally popular with the Korean audience, earning over six million admissions over the 2009 Christmas period. Based on a Korean folktale, it stars Gang Dong-won in the title role. The film became the 3rd best-selling film of 2009 in Korea, with 6,100,532 tickets sold nationwide.

== Plot ==
Five hundred years ago in the Joseon period, the Flute of the prophecy fell into the hands of evil goblins, propelling the world into a whirlwind of disorder. The ancient Taoist wizards turn to the greatest ascetics of their time, the Master (Baek Yoon-sik) and Hwadam (Kim Yoon-seok) for help in vanquishing the goblins and trust each wizard with one-half of the Flute. Meanwhile, the Master's rascal student Jeon Woochi (Gang Dong-won) tricks the king with the art of transformation and creates a fiasco, which makes the three Taoist wizards and Hwadam visit the Master. But they find the Master murdered and his half of the Flute missing. Woochi is framed for the murder, and as punishment, he and his trusty dog Chorangyi (Yoo Hae-jin) are imprisoned inside a scroll by the wizards.

Seoul, 2009. For some strange reason, goblins that had been sealed up in the past begin to appear one by one, wreaking havoc on the city. The three Taoist wizards had been enjoying their years of retirement as a priest, a monk, and a shaman, while Hwadam has long disappeared in order to polish his Taoist art. After much discussion, the three wizards unseal the scroll and call forth Jeon Woochi and Chorangyi. Being offered freedom in return for catching the goblins, Woochi sets out on his task. But what began as a hunt for goblins slowly turns into Woochi's personal sightseeing expedition of the modern-day world. And to top it off, he meets a woman with the same face as the one that had captivated him so many centuries ago (Im Soo-jung). Together with Seo In-kyung (his new, yet old love), Woochi begins his adventure.

Unbeknownst to anyone, Hwadam has been secretly releasing the goblins to distract the Taoist wizards away for his own personal motive. Having taken the Flute for himself, Hwadam intends to release the Arch God who has been imprisoned in a human body. He discovers In-kyung whom he suspects is the Arch God. After failing to make it in the acting business partially due to her innocent and cute looks, Hwadam uses his powers and changes her into a self-assured and savvy actress. The director having been frustrated with his chosen actress' behavior, takes notice of In-kyung and has her cast as his new leading lady. Both Woochi and Chorangyi discover Hwadam's true motive in murdering the Master in order to steal the flute for himself.

Soon the truth comes out when Chorangyi reveals to the three Taoist wizards that Hwadam played them for fools and had murdered the Master in order to take the Flute for himself. Confronting him, the wizards realize that they had wrongfully imprisoned Woochi and trick Hwadam into believing they're giving up the flute. Woochi takes the flute and it leads to a battle between him and Hwadan. The Flute is destroyed, but Hwadam makes his final stand. He is stopped by In-kyung using the Arch-God's power and making the Taoist wizards realize that she was the Arch-God herself. Hwadam is sealed away in the scroll for his crimes in murdering the master. Woochi reveals to Chorangyi, much to his horror, that he is a female dog.

The movie with In-kyung in the lead is successful, and the director is glad to have made the change in actresses. However, the original actress for the role shows up to give the director and everyone else an earful with her tirades. Woochi uses his powers to trick her with the art of transformation and helps In-kyung and himself escape to a beach in Batangas.

== Cast ==
- Gang Dong-won as Jeon Woo-chi
- Kim Yoon-seok as Hwa-dam
- Im Soo-jung as Seo In-kyung
- Yoo Hae-jin as Cho Raeng-yi
- Kim Sang-ho as Priest
- Joo Jin-mo as Shaman
- Song Young-chang as Buddhist monk
- Baek Yoon-sik as Master Wizard
- Yum Jung-ah as Actress
- Gong Jung-hwan as Goblin
- Sunwoo Sun as Goblin
- Shin Cheol-jin as Homeless person
- Park Soo-young as Nobleman's son
- Kim Hyo-jin as Red hair
- Ko Jun as Person at inn 3

== Home media ==
Shout! Factory released the film on Blu-ray Disc and DVD on April 9, 2013.
