= Gang Dong-won =

South Korean actor (born 1981)

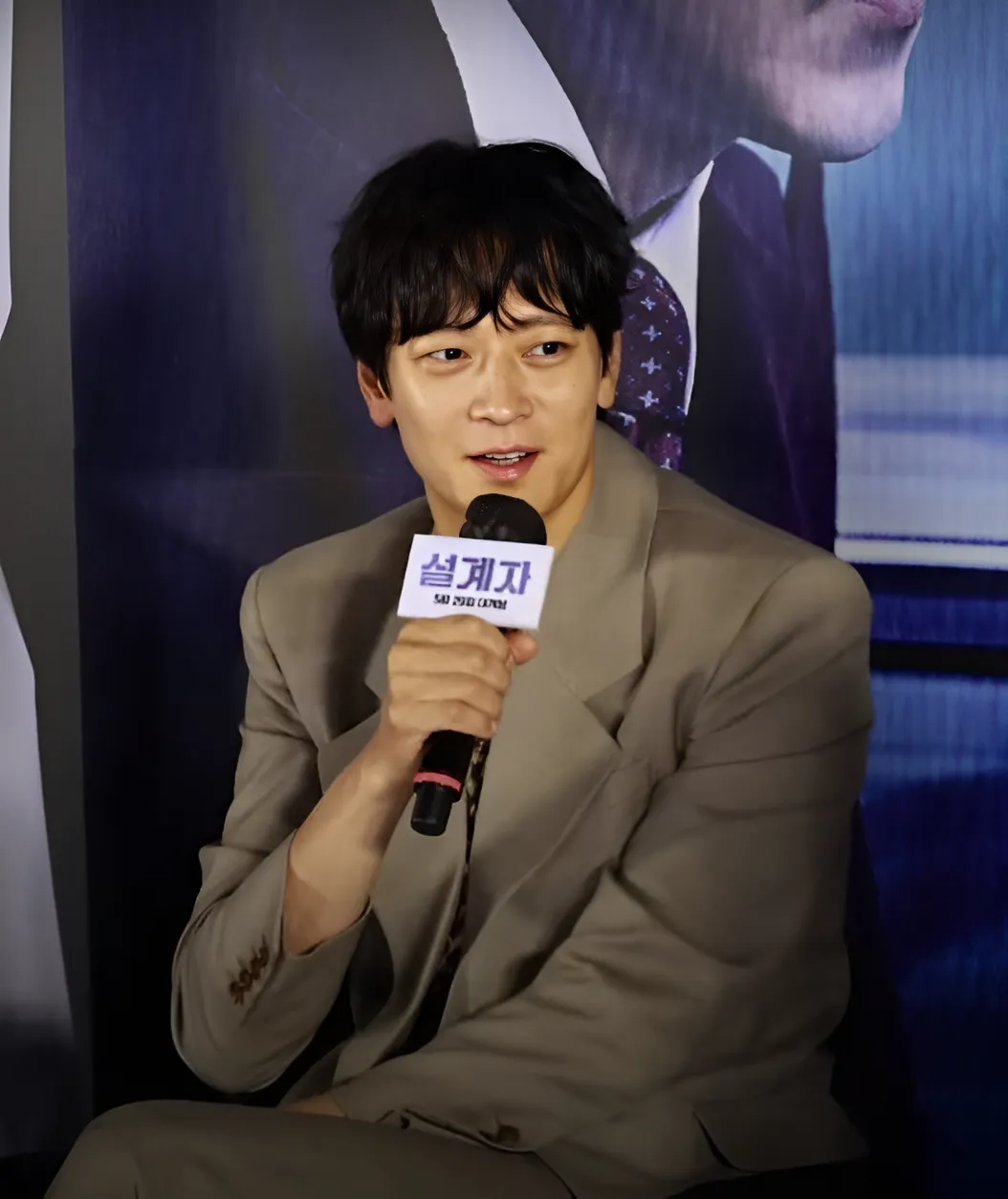
- Gang in April 2024
- Born: January 18, 1981 (age 45); Busan, South Korea
- Other name: Kang Dong-won
- Education: Hanyang University (Mechanical engineering)
- Occupation: Actor
- Years active: 2000–present
- Agents: AA Group (South Korea); Creative Artists Agency (USA)

Korean name
- Hangul: 강동원
- Hanja: 姜棟元
- RR: Gang Dongwon
- MR: Kang Tongwŏn

Gang Dong-won (Korean: 강동원; born January 18, 1981) is a South Korean actor. He debuted as a model and rose to stardom through the film Temptation of Wolves (2004). He is subsequently known for starring in the films Maundy Thursday (2006), Jeon Woo-chi: The Taoist Wizard (2009), Secret Reunion (2010), Kundo: Age of the Rampant (2014), The Priests (2015), A Violent Prosecutor (2016), Master (2016), and Peninsula (2020).

== Early life and education ==
Gang Dong-won was born January 18, 1981, in Busan, and grew up in Changwon of South Gyeongsang Province. His father, Gang Cheol-woo, was an engineer and later the vice president of SPP Heavy Industries. Gang's family suffered economic hardship at times and Gang had to work part-time in college to pay for his tuition. Academically gifted with an IQ of 137, Gang graduated from Hanyang University at Ansan with a degree in mechanical engineering.

== Career ==
=== 2000–2004: Beginnings ===
In 2000, when Gang was a first year university student, he was spotted on the street by a modeling agent. Thus began his modeling career, and he appeared on the catwalk for prêt-à-porter collections in Paris such as DKNY, Gucci and Hugo Boss, as well as for the local Seoul Fashion Artists Association (SFAA).

After being cast in the music video for Jo Sung-mo's "I Swear," Gang began taking acting classes, leading to a change in career. He made his acting debut on television in 2003, playing a doctor with a regional dialect in Country Princess (also known as Funny Wild Girl), and a chaebol's son in Something About 1%. In 2004, he shot his first movie, the romantic comedy Too Beautiful to Lie, which was moderately successful.

=== 2005–2010: Career breakthrough and mainstream success ===
Gang's first real breakthrough was in Temptation of Wolves, the film adaptation of Guiyeoni's teen internet novel. Gang's popularity subsequently rose, extending to other Asian countries, especially Japan. He then briefly returned to television as an antihero in Magic, though it received low ratings.

Gang's next roles were an inmate on death row on Maundy Thursday, and the antagonist in Voice of a Murderer. His two collaborations with auteur Lee Myung-se in Duelist and M further cemented Gang's status as one of the top young actors in Korean cinema, earning him critical recognition for his stylish flair and diverse choice of roles.

Gang said that he decided to play the mischievous titular character in the action fantasy Jeon Woo-chi: The Taoist Wizard because "he wanted to work on a fun movie, as he was emotionally drained while formerly having worked on several serious films. The Choi Dong-hoon film turned into a holiday blockbuster, selling over 6 million tickets over the winter season despite opening in theaters only a week after the release of Avatar in Korea. In 2010, he was cast opposite veteran actor Song Kang-ho in Jang Hoon's spy film Secret Reunion. It became one of the biggest Korean box office hits of 2010, with over 5 million tickets sold. He then joined the Busan-centered omnibus Camellia, starring in Jang Joon-hwan's short film Love For Sale. Gang's last project before enlistment was the psychic thriller Haunters.

=== 2010–2012: Military service ===
Gang enlisted for his mandatory military service on November 18, 2010, for four weeks of basic training at the Nonsan military camp in South Chungcheong Province. This was followed by non-active duty as a public service worker at Seoul City Research Institute of Public Health and Environment. He was discharged on November 12, 2012. On the day of his release, his agency uploaded a three minutes YouTube clip of him in various locations throughout the city, titled "Gang Dong-won in a Day."

=== 2013–present: Return to acting ===
In 2013, Gang appeared in The X, a 30-minute spy thriller directed by Kim Jee-woon.

In 2014, Gang returned to the big screen in Yoon Jong-bin's period action film Kundo: Age of the Rampant, playing an illegitimate nobleman's son who attempts to destroy a group of Robin Hood-like outlaws in 19th century Joseon Dynasty. He next starred in My Brilliant Life, E J-yong's film adaptation of Kim Aeran's bestselling novel My Palpitating Life about a couple who must watch their son suffering from progeria grow prematurely old.

In 2015, Gang reunited with Jeon Woo-chi co-star Kim Yoon-seok in Jang Jae-hyun's mystery thriller The Priests.

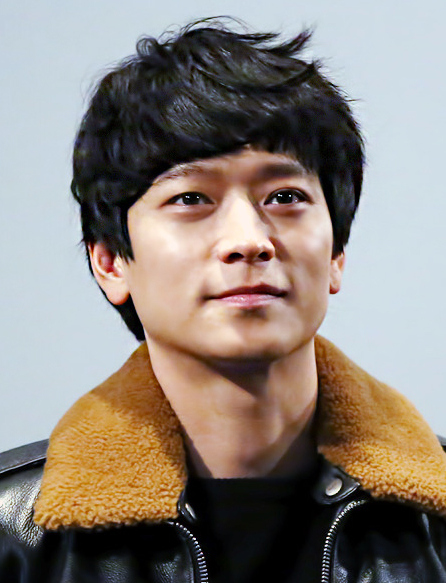
Gang in 2016

In 2016, Gang played a young con artist in the crime film A Violent Prosecutor directed by Lee Il-hyung, which became the second highest grossing Korean film of 2016. He also starred in Um Tae-hwa's fantasy film Vanishing Time: A Boy Who Returned and Cho Ui-seok's financial thriller film Master together with Lee Byung-hun and Kim Woo-bin. After ending the contract with United Artist Agency, Gang signed with a new agency, YG Entertainment in January 2016.

In 2017, Gang made a special appearance as Lee Han-yeol in Jang Joon-hwan's historical film 1987: When the Day Comes.

In 2018, Gang played a deliveryman framed for the assassination of a politician in Noh Dong-seok's thriller Golden Slumber, based on Isaka Kotaro's novel of the same name. His next project was Kim Jee-woon's science fiction action thriller Illang: The Wolf Brigade, which is a film adaptation based on Jin-Roh: The Wolf Brigade, a Japanese animated thriller.

In 2020, Gang starred in Yeon Sang-ho's horror-action-thriller Peninsula, a standalone sequel to the 2016 hit Train to Busan. He then starred in Hirokazu Kore-eda's film Broker where he played the role of Dong-soo–a man who was abandoned by his parents, and now sells abandoned babies with his friend played by Song Kang-ho. The film competed for the Palme d'Or at the 2022 Cannes Film Festival.

In December 2022, Gang ended his contract with YG Entertainment after about 7 years. In 2023, he established his own one-man agency, Studio AA Group. In a March 2024 interview, Imaginus vice president Ryu Hyung-jin revealed that Gang Dong-won co-leads Studio AA, one of ten labels under Imaginus, the content production company founded by Choi Jin-hee, former CEO of Studio Dragon.

In June 2024, Gang was invited to become a member of the Academy of Motion Picture Arts and Sciences. In October, Netflix released the historical war action film, Uprising. Directed by Kim Sang-man and produced by Park Chan-wook, the film stars Gang as Cheon Yeong, a man with unparalleled swordsmanship skills, and depicts the lives of two childhood friends who become adversaries during the Japanese invasions of Korea. The movie premiered at the 29th Busan International Film Festival on October 2, 2024, and was released on Netflix on October 11. On November 12, 2024, Gang officially launched his fashion brand, NONYMOUSAA.

Gang's drama series, Polaris, with the English title Tempest, premiered on Disney+ and Hulu on September 10, 2025. Co-produced by two Imaginus labels, Showrunner and Studio AA, the series was written by Jeong Seo-kyeong and directed by Kim Hee-won. Gang stars as Baek San-ho, a former top international mercenary with a mysterious past, who crosses paths with diplomat Seo Mun-ju, played by Jun Ji-hyun.

== Endorsements ==
In May 2022, Gang was selected as the house ambassador for French luxury brand Louis Vuitton.

== Personal life ==
=== Family history controversy ===
In March 2017, a user of the website Max Movie uploaded a list of currently active film actors who are descendants of pro-Japanese collaborators, and listed Gang. His maternal great-grandfather Lee Jong-man (1885–1977) is listed in the pro-Japanese biographical dictionary, having been involved in the mining business during the Japanese colonial rule and donating to the Japanese army. Because of the revelation, Gang issued a public apology and cancelled his scheduled recording for the Vanishing Time: A Boy Who Returned commentary.

=== Unregistered agency ===
Gang's agency AA Group, set up in 2023 after he left YG Entertainment, was reported in September 2025 to have no popular-culture planning-business registration. Reports grouped him with other entertainers accused of operating without that licence, which the statute can punish with up to two years' imprisonment or a ₩20 million fine. AA Group said it learned of the problem after the coverage, that it had not known the process because it had no separate website, and that it had applied for the required training and was registering. In March 2026 the Seoul Western District Prosecutors' Office gave the agency's representative a suspended indictment after concluding the firm had corrected the breach.

== Filmography ==
=== Film ===
Year	Title	Role	Notes	Ref.
2004	Too Beautiful to Lie	Choi Hee-cheol		
2004	Temptation of Wolves	Jeong Tae-seong		
2005	Duelist	Sad Eyes		
2006	Maundy Thursday	Jeong Yun-soo		
2007	Voice of a Murderer	Kidnapper	Voice	
2007	M	Han Min-woo		
2009	Jeon Woo-chi: The Taoist Wizard	Jeon Woo-chi		
2010	Secret Reunion	Song Jee-won		
2010	Haunters	Cho-in		
2011	Camellia	Jay	Segment: "Love for Sale"	
2013	The X	X	Short film	
2014	Kundo: Age of the Rampant	Jo Yoon		
2014	My Brilliant Life	Dae-su		
2015	The Priests	Deacon Choi		
2016	A Violent Prosecutor	Han Chi-won		
2016	Vanishing Time: A Boy Who Returned	adult Sung-min		
2016	Master	Kim Jae-myung		
2017	1987: When the Day Comes	Lee Han-yeol	Special appearance	
2018	Golden Slumber	Kim Gun-woo		
2018	Illang: The Wolf Brigade	Im Joong-kyung		
2020	Peninsula	Jeong-seok		
2022	Broker	Dong-soo		
2023	Dr. Cheon and Lost Talisman	Dr. Cheon		
2024	The Plot	Yeong-il		
2024	Uprising	Cheon Yeong		
2025	Dark Nuns	Deacon Choi	Cameo	
2026	Wild Sing	Hyun-woo		

=== Television ===
Year	Title	Role	Notes	Ref.
2003	Country Princess	Min Ji-hoon		
2003	Something About 1%	Lee Jae-in		
2004	Magic	Cha Gang-jae		
2025	Tempest	Baek San-ho		

=== Music video appearances ===
Year	Title	Artist	Ref.
2000	"I Swear" (다짐)	Jo Sung-mo	
2001	"Light" (빛)	J	
2004	"It Rains" (비가와)	Jung Chul	
2010	"Let's Break Up" (헤어지자고)	Joo Hyung-jin	
2016	"Telling A Secret" (비밀을 말하다)	Joo Hyung-jin	
2022	"I'll Hear" (들을게)	Joo Hyung-jin	

== Discography ==
=== Singles ===
==== Soundtrack appearances ====
List of singles, with year, and album
Title	Year	Album
"Shadow" (with Ha Ji-won)	2005	Non-album single (Note: Featured in closing credits of Duelist)
"Love Song" (with Ha Ji-won)	2005	Non-album single
"Victimae paschali laudes" (Deacon Choi Version)	2015	The Priests OST
"A Hidden Path" (가리워진 길) (with Kim Tae-ri)	2017	1987: When the Day Comes OST
"Cheer Up" (Friends with Shin Hae Chul Version) (with Kim Sung-kyun, Kim Dae-myung, and Shin Hae Chul)	2018	Golden Slumber OST

== Accolades ==
=== Awards and nominations ===
Name of the award ceremony, year presented, category, nominee of the award, and the result of the nomination
Award ceremony	Year	Category	Nominee / Work	Result	Ref.
Baeksang Arts Awards	2004	Most Popular Actor – Film	Too Beautiful to Lie	Won	
Baeksang Arts Awards	2004	Best New Actor – Film	Too Beautiful to Lie	Nominated	
Baeksang Arts Awards	2005	Most Popular Actor – Film	Temptation of Wolves	Won	
Baeksang Arts Awards	2007	Best Actor – Film	Maundy Thursday	Nominated	
Baeksang Arts Awards	2010	Best Actor – Film	Secret Reunion	Nominated	
Blue Dragon Film Awards	2004	Popular Star Award	Temptation of Wolves	Won	
Blue Dragon Film Awards	2004	Best New Actor	Temptation of Wolves	Nominated	
Blue Dragon Film Awards	2005	Popular Star Award	Duelist	Won	
Blue Dragon Film Awards	2010	Best Actor	Secret Reunion	Nominated	
Buil Film Awards	2010	Best Actor	Secret Reunion	Nominated	
Buil Film Awards	2018	Popular Star Award	Illang: The Wolf Brigade	Nominated	
Buil Film Awards	2020	Popular Star Award	Peninsula	Won	
CGV Audience Choice of the Year Awards	2005	Best New Actor	Temptation of Wolves	Won	
Director's Cut Awards	2004	Best New Actor	Too Beautiful to Lie	Won	
Golden Cinematography Awards	2005	Best New Actor	Temptation of Wolves	Won	
Grand Bell Awards	2004	Best New Actor	Too Beautiful to Lie	Nominated	
Grand Bell Awards	2010	Best Actor	Secret Reunion	Nominated	
Grand Bell Awards	2014	Best Actor	Kundo: Age of the Rampant	Nominated	
InStyle Star Icon	2016	Best Actor	The Priests	Won	
Korean Association of Film Critics Awards	2004	Best New Actor	Temptation of Wolves	Won	
Korean Association of Film Critics Awards	2010	Best Actor	Secret Reunion	Won	
Korean Film Awards	2004	Best New Actor	Temptation of Wolves / Too Beautiful to Lie	Won	
MBC Drama Awards	2003	Best New Actor	Something About 1%	Won	
New York Asian Film Festival	2017	Star Asia Award	Vanishing Time: A Boy Who Returned	Won	

=== Listicles ===
Name of publisher, year listed, name of listicle, and placement
Publisher	Year	Listicle	Placement	Ref.
Forbes Korea	2011	Korea Power Celebrity 40	21st	
The Screen	2019	2009–2019 Top Box Office Powerhouse Actors in Korean Movies	9th	
