= Broker (2022 film) =

2022 South Korean film by Hirokazu Kore-eda

- Theatrical release poster
- Hangul: 브로커
- RR: Beurokeo
- MR: Pŭrok'ŏ
- Directed by: Hirokazu Kore-eda
- Written by: Hirokazu Kore-eda
- Produced by: Eugene Lee
- Starring: Song Kang-ho; Gang Dong-won; Bae Doona; Lee Ji-eun; Lee Joo-young
- Cinematography: Hong Kyung-pyo
- Edited by: Hirokazu Kore-eda
- Music by: Jung Jae-il
- Production company: Zip Cinema
- Distributed by: CJ E&M
- Release dates: 26 May 2022 (Cannes); 8 June 2022 (South Korea)
- Running time: 129 minutes
- Country: South Korea
- Language: Korean
- Box office: US$18.9 million

Broker (Korean: 브로커; RR: Beurokeo) is a 2022 South Korean drama film written, edited and directed by Hirokazu Kore-eda, in his Korean-language debut. Starring Song Kang-ho, Gang Dong-won, Bae Doona, Lee Ji-eun and Lee Joo-young, it follows a family associated with baby boxes, which allow infants to be dropped off anonymously to be cared for by others.

The film had its world premiere at the main competition of the 2022 Cannes Film Festival on 26 May, where it won the Ecumenical Jury Award and the Best Actor Award for Song Kang-ho. It was theatrically released in South Korea on 8 June by CJ E&M.

== Plot ==
Ha Sang-hyeon volunteers at a church with his friend Dong-soo, and together they run an illegal operation where they secretly remove babies left in the church's baby box and sell them through the adoption black market. One night, So-young leaves her newborn son, Woo-sung, at the church. When So-young returns to the church, Dong-soo explains the brokers' plan, and she decides to accompany him and Sang-hyeon to meet potential adoptive parents for Woo-sung. After visiting the orphanage where Dong-soo grew up, Hae-jin, a child from the orphanage, secretly climbs into the group's van and joins them.

The police are investigating So-young for having murdered Woo-sung's biological father, while detectives Soo-jin and Lee are pursuing the brokers. After an unsuccessful sting operation, Soo-jin uses the case against So-young to secure her cooperation in arresting the brokers. The widow of Woo-sung’s father employs Tae-ho, a gangster that Sang-hyeon owes money to, to get Woo-sung back.

The brokers eventually find a couple willing to adopt Woo-sung on the condition that So-young will never meet him. So-young later reveals to Sang-hyeon and Dong-soo that she murdered Woo-sung's father. At an amusement park, Dong-soo discusses the idea of the three of them raising Woo-sung together as a family. However, So-young says that she will be arrested for murder and will not be able to raise Woo-sung. Sang-hyeon meets with his estranged daughter, who says her mother does not want further contact and is expecting another child, while Soo-jin listens nearby.

Soo-jin instructs So-young to turn herself in for accidental manslaughter in exchange for a three-year sentence and the ability to see Woo-sung afterward. Sang-hyeon and Dong-soo deduce that So-young has made a deal with the police but accept that she is acting for Woo-sung's sake and proceed with the plan. On the way to the meeting, Tae-ho confronts them, leading Dong-soo to continue alone while Sang-hyeon stays behind to negotiate with him. At the meeting, Dong-soo is arrested by the police and learns So-young has turned herself in. At a transit center, Sang-hyeon sees a news report stating that a body has been found in the same Seoul underground shopping center where he last met Tae-ho, and that the victim is a gangster from Busan.

Three years later, Soo-jin has adopted Woo-sung. Although the couple who tried to adopt him were barred for their illegal involvement, she still lets them visit Woo-sung. After So-young is released from prison, Soo-jin writes to her and arranges a meeting with Woo-sung in a park, noting that Sang-hyeon cannot be found. Hae-jin tries to hitchhike to the park, but the orphanage bus picks him up instead. Now working at a gas station, So-young looks at a photo of the group. At the park, a hand-laundry van arrives. As So-young runs to meet Woo-sung, the van, displaying the same photo she keeps, drives off.

== Cast ==
- Song Kang-ho as Ha Sang-hyeon, the owner of a laundry shop who takes babies from a baby box at a nearby church and sells them
- Gang Dong-won as Dong-soo, Sang-hyeon's right-hand man who works part-time at the church and covers for Sang-hyeon
- Bae Doona as Soo-jin, a police detective who is investigating the two men's illegal business
- Lee Ji-eun as Moon So-young, a mother who decides to leave her baby at the baby box
- Lee Joo-young as Detective Lee, Soo-jin's colleague who also participates in the investigation
- Park Ji-yong as Woo-sung, So-young's baby
- Im Seung-soo as Hae-jin, a child in the same nursery as Dong-soo who joins the brokers' journey
- Kang Gil-woo as Mr. Lim, a trader who illegally trafficks children
- Lee Moo-saeng as Seon-ho
- Ryu Kyung-soo as Shin Tae-ho
- Song Sae-byeok as a kindergarten director.
- Kim Sun-young as the wife of the kindergarten director
- Lee Dong-hwi as Song
- Kim Sae-byuk as Song's wife
- Kim Do-yeon as Sun-ah
- Park Hae-joon as Yoon
- Oh Hee-joon as Detective Choi's subordinate
- Baek Hyun-jin as Detective Choi
- Kim Ye-eun as Im's wife

== Production ==
=== Development ===
The idea for Broker was initially conceived by Kore-eda while researching the Japanese adoption system for his 2013 film Like Father, Like Son, discovering in the process its similarities with the South Korean adoption system. He learned about Japan's only baby box, a place where people can anonymously leave children, and the criticism surrounding the system in Japan. It can be found all around the world, including South Korea, where it is much more popular in comparison with Japan. After Kore-eda discussed with Song, Bae, Gang making a film together, he decided to combine the two ideas. Kore-eda had previously become acquainted with Song and Gang at various film festivals, while he met Bae on the set of his 2009 film, Air Doll. Kore-eda has described Broker as being a companion piece to his 2018 film Shoplifters, with the two films sharing a thematic interest in social outcasts who come together to form unconventional families.

The film was announced on August 26, 2020, with Song, Bae, and Gang set to star, under the working title reported to be Baby, Box, Broker or simply Broker. Kore-eda originally used Baby, Box, Broker as the goal of the story was to connect the three elements. However, as he was writing the script he settled on Broker because he "realized that [the film] had this structure where it's the detective's side, Soo-jin's side, that ultimately wants the baby to be sold the most. The 'broker' in the film changes as the story unfolds. And I thought by focusing on the word Broker, the title would become very simple and strong. I really liked this structure where the person wanting to sell the baby inverts as the storytelling progresses."

=== Writing ===
After meeting with the three South Korean actors, Kore-eda started working on the script. Kore-eda said the first image that came to his mind was "of Song Kang-ho, wearing a priest's outfit and holding a baby, smiling at the baby and then selling the baby." After the casting of actress Lee Ji-eun, who is also a renowned singer in South Korea, Kore-eda chose to add a scene where Lee sings a lullaby. Even though he had written an initial draft, Kore-eda struggled with the ending of Broker and he ended up rewriting it many times during the shooting with the help of Song.

=== Casting ===
Kore-eda said Song was the South Korean actor he wanted to collaborate with the most and the first person who came to his mind for the role of Sang-hyeon. Gang and Bae came to the director's attention after he saw their performances in Secret Reunion and Air Doll respectively, with the latter being directed by Kore-eda himself. In February 2021, Lee Ji-eun was announced to have joined the cast. Kore-eda chose to cast Lee after having seen numerous Korean dramas while in quarantine, including the 2018 television series My Mister starring Lee, where her performance impressed him. Lee said she accepted because she was looking forward to playing a mother when Kore-eda offered her the role. While preparing for the role, she researched how society views single mothers and the hardships they go through. In March 2021, it was reported that Lee Joo-young had joined the cast. She was picked by Kore-eda after he saw her performance in Itaewon Class and A Quiet Dream.

=== Filming ===
Principal photography took place from April 14 to June 22, 2021. The director of photography is Hong Kyung-pyo. Notable filming locations include Pohang, Uljin and Samcheok.

=== Music ===
Broker

Soundtrack album by Jung Jae-il
- Released: 15 June 2022
- Recorded: 2022
- Genre: Soundtrack
- Length: 42:40
- Language: Korean
- Labels: Genie Music; Stone Music Entertainment

The score was written by South Korean composer Jung Jae-il. It was digitally released on June 15, 2022.

Original track list
No.	Title	Length
1.	"Staircases" (계단)	1:46
2.	"Bus Stop" (정류장)	0:44
3.	"In The Beginning Was Rain" (시작은...비)	2:29
4.	"To Be A Bird" (새처럼)	4:55
5.	"Eavesdrop" (처맛물)	1:54
6.	"Family Trip" (가족여행)	2:48
7.	"Follow The Dot" (뒤를 밟다)	2:01
8.	"Saddle The Wind" (바람에 실려)	1:02
9.	"See You When I See You" (기약없는 이별)	0:43
10.	"Companiero" (동승)	1:09
11.	"From Afar" (멀리서)	3:46
12.	"The Box" (상자)	0:39
13.	"Betrayal" (배신)	0:54
14.	"Booooo" (야유)	0:27
15.	"Fleeing From The Past" (도망쳐)	1:14
16.	"End Up Where" (이 길은 어디로)	0:54
17.	"Daughter" (딸)	0:51
18.	"Suspended Step" (죽음)	1:44
19.	"Old Pal" (옛친구)	2:00
20.	"Running" (달리기)	1:10
21.	"Thank You" (고마워)	0:49
22.	"Forgiven" (용서)	5:29
23.	"Us" (우리)	2:06
24.	"Prayer" (기도)	1:18
Total length:		42:40

Songs not featured on the official soundtrack: (Note: The songs were listed in the closing credits of the film.)

- "Tes Bro!" (테스형!) by Na Huna, (Note: Tess bro refers to the greek philosopher Socrates.) sung by Song Kang Ho in the movie
- "Yeosu Night Sea" (여수 밤바다) by Busker Busker
- "Jin Jin Ja Ra" (진진자라) by Tae Jin-ah
- "The One I Remember" (그때 그 사람) by Shim Soo-bong
- "Wise Up" by Aimee Mann
- "Schlafe, mein Prinzchen, schlaf ein" sung by Lee Ji-eun with the popular korean version of the lyrics "Jaljara, uri aga" (잘자라 우리아가) written by Kim Seong-tae

== Release ==
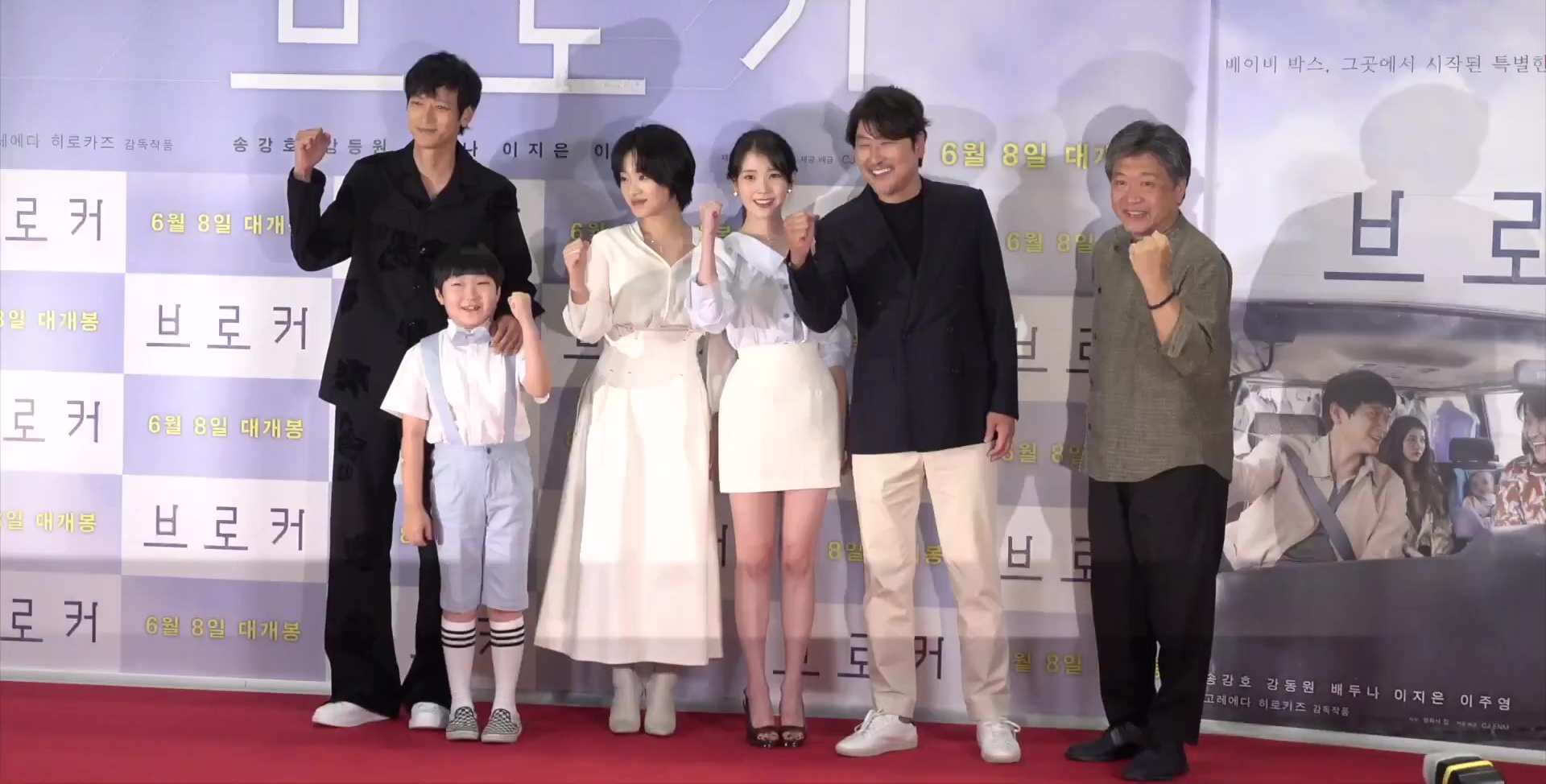
Cast and director at VIP premiere in June 2022.

In May 2022, prior to the film's Cannes premiere, Neon acquired North American distribution rights. Picturehouse Entertainment acquired UK and Irish distribution rights. The film's rights were also pre-sold to Metropolitan Filmexport (France), Gaga Corporation (Japan), Koch Films (Germany and Italy), Triart Film (Scandinavia), September Films (Benelux), Edko Film (Hong Kong and Macao) and Madman Entertainment (Australia and New Zealand). According to CJ E&M, the film has been sold to 171 countries ahead of its premiere in competition at 75th Cannes Film Festival. The number of countries then rose to 188.

Broker was released in Hong Kong and Singapore on June 23 and in Japan on June 24. It was selected as the closing film of the 69th Sydney Film Festival and was screened on June 19. The Canadian premiere was held at the 2022 Toronto International Film Festival in September. It was released in the United States on December 26, 2022. It also was released in France in the same month.

== Reception ==
=== Box office ===
Broker was released on June 8, 2022, on 1,594 screens. It opened with 146,221 admissions and topped the South Korean box office. The film crossed 1 million cumulative admissions in 11 days of release, by recording 1,040,709 cumulative viewers. It became the first film directed by Kore-eda to surpass 1 million admissions in South Korea.

As of September 10, 2022, it is at 11th place among all the Korean films released in the year 2022 with gross of US$9,672,172 and 1,260,740 admissions. Its largest international market is Japan, with gross of US$4,470,263.

=== Critical response ===
Broker was screened at the Lumière Theater, the main theater of the Cannes International Film Festival, on May 26, 2022. After the film finished, there was a standing ovation for 12 minutes. On review aggregator website Rotten Tomatoes, 94% of 149 reviews are positive for the film, with an average rating of 7.60/10. The site's critics consensus reads: "Broker skirts the edges of sentimentality, but is consistently grounded by Kore-eda Hirokazu's warm, tenderly melancholic approach." Metacritic assigned the film a weighted average score of 76 out of 100, based on 20 critics, indicating "generally favorable reviews".

Ella Kemp of IndieWire graded the film as A− and wrote, "The execution of this premise is, somehow, miraculous in its sensitivity, asking questions about issues of ethics, of choice, of money, and murder, and family, and how to find love in all this sorry mess."

Writing for The Hollywood Reporter, David Rooney praised the actors' performances and Kore-eda's direction, saying, "much of this might have been formulaic in less artful hands, but Kore-eda has an unfaltering lightness of touch, a way of injecting emotional veracity and spontaneity into every moment."

Nicholas Barber of the BBC rated the film five stars out of five and called it "one of the year's most delightful films."

Tim Robey of The Telegraph rated the film two stars out of five and stated, "Anaemic and maudlin by turns, this may be the Cannes competition's biggest disappointment."

=== Accolades ===
Broker was selected to compete for Palme d'Or and won the Ecumenical Jury Award at the 2022 Cannes Film Festival. Song Kang-ho became the first South Korean actor to win Best Actor in the Cannes Film Festival history. The film was selected in CineMasters competition section at Munich Film Festival, where it won the Best International Film award.

Award	Date of ceremony	Category	Recipient(s)	Result	Ref.
Asian Film Awards	12 March 2023	Best Director	Hirokazu Kore-eda	Won	
Asian Film Awards	12 March 2023	Best Newcomer	IU	Nominated	
Baeksang Arts Awards	28 April 2023	Best Actor	Song Kang-ho	Nominated	
Baeksang Arts Awards	28 April 2023	Best Supporting Actress	Bae Doona	Nominated	
Baeksang Arts Awards	28 April 2023	Best New Actress	IU	Nominated	
Blue Dragon Film Awards	25 November 2022	Best Film	Broker	Nominated	
Blue Dragon Film Awards	25 November 2022	Best Director	Hirokazu Kore-eda	Nominated	
Blue Dragon Film Awards	25 November 2022	Best Actor	Song Kang-ho	Nominated	
Blue Dragon Film Awards	25 November 2022	Best New Actress	Lee Ji-eun	Nominated	
Blue Dragon Film Awards	25 November 2022	Best Screenplay	Hirokazu Kore-eda	Nominated	
Blue Dragon Film Awards	25 November 2022	Best Cinematography and Lighting	Hong Kyung-pyo, Park Jeong-woo	Nominated	
Blue Dragon Film Awards	25 November 2022	Best Music	Jung Jae-il	Nominated	
Blue Dragon Film Awards	25 November 2022	Chung Jung-won Popular Star Award	Lee Ji-eun	Won	
Buil Film Awards	6 October 2022	Best Film	Broker	Nominated	
Buil Film Awards	6 October 2022	Best Screenplay	Broker	Nominated	
Buil Film Awards	6 October 2022	Best Director	Hirokazu Kore-eda	Nominated	
Buil Film Awards	6 October 2022	Best Actor	Song Kang-ho	Nominated	
Buil Film Awards	6 October 2022	Best New Actress	Lee Ji-eun	Nominated	
Buil Film Awards	6 October 2022	Best Supporting Actress	Lee Joo-young	Nominated	
Buil Film Awards	6 October 2022	Best Cinematography	Hong Kyung-pyo	Nominated	
Buil Film Awards	6 October 2022	Best Music	Jung Jae-il	Nominated	
Buil Film Awards	6 October 2022	Popular Star Award	Lee Ji-eun	Won	
Cannes Film Festival	27—28 May 2022	Palme d'Or	Broker	Nominated	
Cannes Film Festival	27—28 May 2022	Ecumenical Jury Award	Broker	Won	
Cannes Film Festival	27—28 May 2022	Best Actor	Song Kang-ho	Won	
Chunsa Film Art Awards	30 September 2022	Best New Actress	Lee Ji-eun	Won	
Chunsa Film Art Awards	30 September 2022	Best Actor	Song Kang-ho	Nominated	
Chunsa Film Art Awards	30 September 2022	Special Award: Chunsa International Director's Award	Hirokazu Kore-eda	Won	
Golden Cinematography Awards	19 December 2022	Best New Actress	IU	Won	
Grand Bell Awards	9 December 2022	Best Film	Broker	Nominated	
Grand Bell Awards	9 December 2022	Best Actor	Song Kang-ho	Nominated	
Grand Bell Awards	9 December 2022	Best New Actress	Lee Ji-eun	Nominated	
Hawai'i International Film Festival	12 November 2022	Vision in Film Award	Hirokazu Kore-eda	Won	
Jerusalem Film Festival	21—31 July 2022	Best International Film	Broker	Nominated	
Korean Association of Film Critics Awards	24 October 2022	Best New Actress	Lee Ji-eun	Won	
Korean Association of Film Critics Awards	24 October 2022	Korean Association of Film 10 selections of Kim Hyun-seung	Broker	Won	
Munich International Film Festival	23 June—2 July 2022	Best International Film	Broker	Won	
NAACP Image Awards	25 February 2023	Outstanding International Motion Picture	Broker	Nominated	
Norwegian International Film Festival	20—26 August 2022	Ray of Sunshine Award	Broker	Won	
Venice Film Festival	6 September 2022	Robert Bresson Award	Hirokazu Kore-eda	Won	
