= The Priests (film) =

- Theatrical release poster
- Hangul: 검은 사제들
- Hanja: 검은 司祭들
- RR: Geomeun sajedeul
- MR: Kŏmŭn sajedŭl
- Directed by: Jang Jae-hyun
- Written by: Jang Jae-hyun
- Based on: 12th Assistant Deacon by Jang Jae-hyun
- Produced by: Baek Ji-sun; Song Dae-chan; Oh Hyo-jin; Lee Yoo-jin
- Starring: Kim Yoon-seok; Gang Dong-won
- Cinematography: Go Nak-sun
- Edited by: Shin Min-kyung
- Music by: Kim Tae-seong
- Production company: Zip Cinema
- Distributed by: CJ Entertainment
- Release date: November 5, 2015
- Running time: 108 minutes
- Country: South Korea
- Language: Korean
- Box office: US$36.9 million

The Priests (Korean: 검은 사제들; lit. 'Black Priests') is a 2015 South Korean supernatural horror mystery film written and directed by Jang Jae-hyun, based on his award-winning short film 12th Assistant Deacon. It was followed by a 2025 sequel Dark Nuns (Korean: 검은 수녀들; also known as The Priest 2: Dark Nuns).

== Plot ==
A young girl who belongs to Father Kim's parish becomes comatose after a hit-and-run accident caused by two priests. Father Kim suspects she is possessed by an evil spirit. Father Kim along with a rebellious young seminarian named Choi try to exorcise the demon and confine it in a piglet. Members of a Rosicrucian sect inform Father Kim that two of their priests were killed by this demon. During the exorcism, the demon manifests, inflicting unnatural bodily rashes. Choi initially runs out halfway through the exorcism attempt, but eventually decides to return, determined to finish what they started. Father Kim tells him to believe this ministry isn't in vain and the reward is in the Lord's hand (Isaiah 49:4). Choi replies by quoting Ezekiel 2:6, and affirms he is prepared now. When they try to free the girl from the demon's powerful hold, they realize that the demon they are facing is an ancient one named Malphas and is far more dangerous than they ever thought. However, they manage to confine it in the piglet, but the police arrive and try to arrest them for killing Young-shin, acting on a complaint by her extremely traumatized parents. Choi runs out with the pig, faces many obstructions but successfully drowns it in the river as instructed by Kim (Luke 8:33). Young-shin who was considered dead shows signs of life, and Father Kim's and Brother Choi's rashes disappear.

== Cast ==
- Kim Yoon-seok as Father Kim
- Gang Dong-won as Deacon Choi
- Park So-dam as Young-shin
- Kim Eui-sung as Dean of clergy
- Son Jong-hak as Monsignor
- Lee Ho-jae as Father Jeong
- Nam Il-woo as Abbott
- Kim Byeong-ok as Professor Park
- Cho Soo-hyang as Agnes
- Park Woong as Bishop
- Lee Jeong-yeol as Young-shin's father
- Kim So-sook as Young-shin's mother
- Jeong Ha-dam as Shaman Young-joo
- Kim Soo-jin as Father Kim's younger sister
- Don-Don the pig as Pig

== Reception ==
The film was number-one on its opening weekend, with ₩13 billion. By its third weekend, the film had grossed ₩35 billion at the South Korean box office.

== Awards and nominations ==
Award	Category	Recipient	Result
25th Buil Film Awards	Best Supporting Actress	Park So-dam	Won
25th Buil Film Awards	Best New Actress	Park So-dam	Nominated
16th Women in Film Korea Awards	Best New Actress	Park So-dam	Won
7th KOFRA Film Awards	Best New Actress	Park So-dam	Won
11th Max Movie Awards	Best New Actress	Park So-dam	Won
21st Chunsa Film Art Awards	Best New Actress	Park So-dam	Won
52nd Baeksang Arts Awards	Best New Actress	Park So-dam	Won
10th Asian Film Awards	Best Supporting Actress	Park So-dam	Nominated
3rd Korean Film Producers Association Awards	Best Supporting Actress	Park So-dam	Won
37th Blue Dragon Film Awards	Best Supporting Actress	Park So-dam	Won
37th Blue Dragon Film Awards	Best New Director	Jang Jae-hyun	Nominated
37th Blue Dragon Film Awards	Best Editing	Sin Min-kyeong	Nominated
37th Blue Dragon Film Awards	Best Music	Kim Tae-seong	Nominated
37th Blue Dragon Film Awards	Technical Awards	Baek Sang-hoon-I (Visual effects)	Nominated
