= Cold Eyes (2013 film) =

- Film poster
- Hangul: 감시자들
- Hanja: 監視者들
- RR: Gamsijadeul
- MR: Kamsijadŭl
- Directed by: Cho Ui-seok; Kim Byeong-seo
- Written by: Cho Ui-seok
- Based on: Eye in the Sky by Yau Nai-hoi and Au Kin-yee
- Produced by: Lee Yoo-jin
- Starring: Sul Kyung-gu; Jung Woo-sung; Han Hyo-joo
- Cinematography: Kim Byeong-seo; Yeo Kyung-bo
- Edited by: Shin Min-kyung
- Music by: Dalpalan; Jang Young-gyu
- Production company: Zip Cinema
- Distributed by: Next Entertainment World
- Release date: July 3, 2013
- Running time: 118 minutes
- Country: South Korea
- Language: Korean
- Budget: US$4.5 million
- Box office: US$37.8 million

Cold Eyes (Korean: 감시자들; RR: Gamsijadeul; lit. 'Stakeout' or "Surveillance") is a 2013 South Korean action thriller film starring Sul Kyung-gu, Jung Woo-sung, and Han Hyo-joo. A remake of the 2007 Hong Kong film Eye in the Sky, Cold Eyes is about detectives from the surveillance team of a special crime unit who work together to track down a highly efficient and dangerous robber and the crew he leads.

It made its North American premiere at the 2013 Toronto International Film Festival, and also screened at the 2013 Busan International Film Festival in the Open Cinema section.

== Plot ==
After a job interview, Ha Yoon-joo, a woman with photographic memory gets hired by a police division where she meets members who to her surprise are largely unarmed and don't wear uniforms, as they specialize in surveillance rather than policing. She joins a team led by a man named Hwang, the division avoids arresting criminals and focuses exclusively on following them around to gather information. The surveillance team immediately runs into trouble when they can't identify a particular ring of robbers due to their masks and their efficiency in robbing the bank. In response, Hwang, Ha, and six other officers spend several weeks wandering around the city streets, tagging after people who match the criminal's physical description. When they finally find him, they put cameras outside his apartment.

Meanwhile, James, the leader of the criminals, wishes to quit his line of work, but his elderly mentor responds by sending a man to kill him, whom he successfully defends against. When James's subordinates confer to discuss the next mission, they are successfully tracked by Hwang's officers who call in a SWAT team to subdue them. Elsewhere, James, murders one of Hwang's officers to escape. Later, after the mentor criticises James and is attacked by his bodyguards, James retaliates by murdering both the mentor and his bodyguards. He then acquires a fake Thai passport and gets ready to leave South Korea.

Hwang and Ha both feel sad at the death of their colleague. As a result, Hwang announces his resignation while Ha takes a leave of absence. However, while Ha is doing her laundry, she suddenly remembers how she had randomly run into James in the past. Namely, on the day of her police interview, James fleetingly walked past her inside a subway car, carrying a grocery store brochure. Ha runs to the grocery store and waits there, managing to catch sight of James again, and urgently notifies Hwang and his officers while staying on James's tail. When James walks into a tunnel, Hwang takes over the pursuit, but James recognizes Hwang (he had seen him in the mirror earlier when he was being followed) and stabs him. Luckily, though, the wound isn't fatal. Ha continues the pursuit into the subway tunnels but this time she is also recognized by James and eventually held hostage. When the SWAT team comes down to the subway tunnel, Ha stabs James in the leg but he escapes and runs deeper into the tunnels.

As the chase goes on, James finds himself trapped between the advancing SWAT team and the mouth of the tunnel, which is being guarded by Hwang, who ran the long way around. As James decides to charge at Hwang, the latter, finding himself at the juncture of an oncoming train, stands his ground to shoot at James, risking a 50/50 chance of the train flattening him. Fortunately, the train takes the other branch and James is shot dead by Hwang.

Encouraged by the success, Hwang withdraws his resignation, and together with Ha, goes on to execute further such missions including the pursuit of an international terrorist.

== Cast ==
- Sul Kyung-gu as Chief Hwang
- Jung Woo-sung as James, leader of an international crime ring
- Han Hyo-joo as Ha Yoon-joo / Piglet, rookie detective
- Jin Kyung as Department head Lee
- Lee Jun-ho as Squirrel
- Kim Byeong-ok as Mysterious broker
- Byun Yo-han as M3
- Lee Dong-hwi as Parrot
- Simon Yam as target of surveillance team

== Box office ==
Cold Eyes smashed 2.17 million in the first week of release. After 17 days, it reached 4 million admissions. It reached the 5 million mark on July 27, with 5,506,409 total admissions at the end of its run.

== Awards and nominations ==
2013 Buil Film Awards

- Best Actress - Han Hyo-joo
- Nominated - Best Supporting Actress - Jin Kyung
- Nominated - Best New Actor - Lee Jun-ho
- Nominated - Best Screenplay - Cho Ui-seok
- Nominated - Best Cinematography - Kim Byeong-seo

2013 Korean Association of Film Critics Awards

- Nominated - Best Actress - Han Hyo-joo

2013 Grand Bell Awards

- Nominated - Best Costume Design - Jo Sang-gyeong

2013 Blue Dragon Film Awards

- Best Actress - Han Hyo-joo
- Nominated - Best Supporting Actor - Jung Woo-sung
- Nominated - Best Cinematography - Kim Byeong-seo, Yeo Kyung-bo
- Nominated - Best Lighting - Kim Seung-gyu
- Nominated - Best Music - Dalparan, Jang Young-gyu
- Nominated - Technical Award - Shin Min-kyung

2013 Asia Pacific Film Festival

- Nominated - Best Editing - Shin Min-kyung

2014 Asian Film Awards

- Best Editor - Shin Min-kyung
- Nominated - Best Actress - Han Hyo-joo
- Nominated - Best Supporting Actor - Jung Woo-sung
- Nominated - Best Cinematography - Kim Byeong-seo, Yeo Kyung-bo

2014 Baeksang Arts Awards

- Best Supporting Actress - Jin Kyung
- Nominated - Best Director - Cho Ui-seok, Kim Byeong-seo
- Nominated - Best Actor - Jung Woo-sung
- Nominated - Most Popular Actor (Film) - Jung Woo-sung
- Nominated - Most Popular Actress (Film) - Han Hyo-joo

== See also ==
- List of films featuring surveillance
