= Haunters =

- South Korean poster
- Hangul: 초능력자
- RR: Choneungnyeokja
- MR: Ch'onŭngnyŏkcha
- Directed by: Kim Min-seok
- Written by: Kim Min-seok
- Produced by: Lee Yoo-jin
- Starring: Gang Dong-won; Go Soo
- Cinematography: Hong Kyung-pyo
- Edited by: Kim Sang-bum; Kim Jae-bum
- Music by: Lee Jae-jin
- Production company: Zip Cinema
- Distributed by: Next Entertainment World
- Release date: November 10, 2010
- Running time: 114 minutes
- Country: South Korea
- Language: Korean
- Box office: US$13.3 million

Haunters (Korean: 초능력자; RR: Choneungnyeokja) is a 2010 South Korean science fiction action film written and directed by Kim Min-seok. It depicts the struggle between a psychic named Cho-in (Gang Dong-won) who can control people with his mind and a man named Kyu-nam (Go Soo) who is immune to the psychic's supernatural power.

== Plot ==
Little Cho-in's mother makes him wear a blindfold to suppress his mind control ability. As the two are abused by Cho-in's father, Cho-in compels the man to commit suicide. Cho-in's mother subsequently tries to murder her son, but Cho-in stops her and runs away. He grows up in contempt for the society, making liberal use of his power to steal money from businesses and live in a hotel room.

Kyu-nam works at a scrapyard alongside an international crew, including his best friends Turk Ali and Ghanaian Bubba. He is hit by a car right before his birthday, but makes an unusually quick recovery. However, he loses his job at the scrapyard in the meanwhile. He finds employment at Utopia, a pawn shop owned by Jung-sik, who is concerned about a mysterious loss of money. Kyu-nam befriends Jung-sik's daughter, Yeong-sook, and is visited at his new workplace by Ali and Bubba. Cho-in arrives, paralyzing everyone present and manipulating Jung-sik into giving him money. To Cho-in's surprise, Kyu-nam resists his influence and attempts to stop him. Cho-in uses the others to overpower Kyu-nam; Kyu-nam is stabbed in the back and electrocuted, while Jung-sik gets his head trapped between iron bars at the counter and suffocates. Jung-sik and Kyu-nam are taken to a hospital, where doctors are unable to save Jung-sik, but Kyu-nam recovers almost immediately.

Blaming Cho-in for Jung-sik's death, Kyu-nam resolves to bring the psychic to justice. With the help of Ali and Bubba, he breaks into Utopia's back room to recover the CCTV tape with Cho-in's appearance. The three are forced to flee from a mob of people controlled by Cho-in, and Kyu-nam is separated from the others. He manages to knock Cho-in out and take him to a police station, but the officers ignore his warnings and are mind-controlled. Kyu-nam chases Cho-in to a metro station, where Cho-in commands a mother to throw her infant child against a speeding train. Kyu-nam saves the child, but is struck by the train and left by Cho-in to die. However, he recovers from his wounds once more.

Kyu-nam contacts Ali and Bubba, who agree to help him hunt down Cho-in. Ali modifies an old van and constructs a flare gun with the intent of countering Cho-in's ability. Both Kyu-nam and Cho-in come under investigation by the authorities, who send a team to search Cho-in's hotel room. Cho-in murders the investigators and leaves the apartment, taking with him only a toy figurine of a young man. He robs a bank and visits his mother, who is also being questioned by the authorities; again, Cho-in kills the officers, but is unable to take his mother's life, instead leaving her with a large sum of money. Kyu-nam confronts Cho-in in an apartment complex, where Cho-in mocks him and forces several people into suicide to torment Kyu-nam. Outside, Ali and Bubba attack Cho-in with the flare gun, but it proves ineffective and they are captured.

Back at Utopia, Kyu-nam is ambushed by Cho-in, who then hangs him alongside Ali and Bubba. Kyu-nam escapes, but cannot save his friends in time. Cho-in takes Yeong-sook hostage and causes a large traffic accident to stop Kyu-nam; however, Kyu-nam survives as Ali's and Bubba's apparitions instruct him to activate a speed booster in his van, installed there by Ali. Kyu-nam corners Cho-in on a rooftop, where Kyu-nam is shot but manages to throw both of them onto the street below. Cho-in is killed by the fall while Kyu-nam, once again, lives; he notices Cho-in's toy figurine and reflects on whether in different circumstances, the two of them could have been friends.

At a metro station, a quadriplegic Kyu-nam (who uses a wheelchair) meets up with Yeong-sook, who has fulfilled her dream of becoming a flight attendant. While Yeong-sook is talking to Kyu-nam a child is shown lying on the train tracks. After the train passes it is revealed that she was rescued in the nick of time by Kyu-nam, who seems to have made another miraculous recovery.

== Cast ==
- Gang Dong-won as Cho-in: A robber who eschews humanity in itself after his parents attempted to kill him and wears a prosthetics leg on his right. He lives his life robbing others by using his mind control abilities on people to do the job for him. Upon learning that he can't control Kyu-nam because of his similar supernatural abilities, Cho-in pursues him in frustration to the point of putting everyone's lives at risk.
- Go Soo as Im Kyu-nam: A worker at a pawn shop who was fired from a previous job. He displays similar supernatural abilities to Cho-in, resulting in being immune to his mind control abilities. Realizing what at stake, Kyu-nam must protect his friends from Cho-in.
- Jung Eun-chae as Yeong-sook: Jung-sik's biracial daughter who is studying to become a flight attendant. She is Kyu-nam's love interest and he has to protect her from Cho-in.
- Yoon Da-kyeong as Hyo-sook: Cho-in's mother who attempted to keep his eyes blindfolded so no one can learn about his mind controlling abilities and they can believe he's blind. After leaving her abusive ex-husband(and Cho-in's father), Hyo-sook promised to take good care of him as long as he never removes his blindfold. Upon learning he had gone against her wishes by removing his blindfold resulting in his father's death, Hyo-sook attempted to murder Cho-in in despair, but he escaped and she suffers a mental breakdown.
- Choi Deok-moon as Abby: Kyu-nam's father who took care of him after Kyu-nam became quadriplegic
- Abu Dod as Bubba: One of Kyu-nam's close friends who tries to help him catch Cho-in. He is hanged to death alongside Ali.
- Enes Kaya as Ali: Another of Kyu-nam's close friends that also tries to help him catch Cho-in. Like Bubba, he is also hanged to death.
- Byun Hee-bong as Jung-sik: The owner of a pawn shop and Yeong-sook's father. A kindly man who hires Kyu-nam and is accidentally killed by Cho-in during his robbery attempt.
- Yang Kyeong-mo as young Cho-in
- Kim So-jin as Miss Lee

== Box office ==
Prior to its release, Haunters recorded the highest advance ticket sales for a Korean film in 2010 at 83.47 percent according to Max Movie; it was the first time in four years, after The Host, for bookings to pass the 80 percent mark. It also posted high reservation rates on other ticketing and cinema websites: over 75 percent according to the official Korean Box Office Information System (KOBIS), 82.53 percent on InterPark, 42 percent on Yes24, 71.4 percent on Nate Movies, 56.25 percent on Ticket Link, 84.2 percent at Cinus, 53 percent at Lotte Cinema and 44.2 percent at CGV.

The film opened number one at the South Korean box office collecting 685,670 admissions on its opening weekend, November 12 to 14. The movie took the #1 spot for ticket sales for 2 weeks straight, before it fell down to #3 spot during the 3rd week since opening. The film sold 2,017,485 tickets during the three-week span, eventually selling a total of 2,152,577 tickets nationwide.

At the Asian Film Market held during the 2010 Busan International Film Festival, distribution rights were sold to several countries, including Thailand, Taiwan, Malaysia, Germany, Belgium, the Netherlands and Luxembourg.

== Remake ==
A Japanese language remake titled Monsterz directed by Hideo Nakata was released in 2014. It stars Tatsuya Fujiwara (in Gang's role) and Takayuki Yamada (in Go's role).
