= Master (2016 film) =

- Theatrical release poster
- Hangul: 마스터
- RR: Maseuteo
- MR: Masŭt'ŏ
- Directed by: Cho Ui-seok
- Written by: Cho Ui-seok; Kim Hyun-duk
- Produced by: Lee Yoo-jin
- Starring: Lee Byung-hun; Gang Dong-won; Kim Woo-bin; Uhm Ji-won; Oh Dal-su; Jin Kyung
- Cinematography: Yoo Eok; Kim Jung-woo
- Edited by: Shin Min-kyung
- Music by: Dalpalan; Jang Yeong-gyu
- Production companies: Movie House; Zip Cinema
- Distributed by: CJ Entertainment
- Release date: December 21, 2016
- Running time: 143 minutes
- Countries: South Korea; Philippines
- Language: Korean
- Box office: US$50.5 million

Master (Korean: 마스터, also stylized as MA$TER) is a 2016 South Korean action crime film directed by Cho Ui-seok. Written jointly by Cho Ui-seok and Kim Hyun-duk, it stars Lee Byung-hun, Gang Dong-won and Kim Woo-bin in the lead roles. The narrative centers around the manhunt for a conman launched by South Korea's financial crime unit after he absconds with the money and assumes a new identity, causing a cop to team up with the conman's mastermind partner in order to crack the case involving a nationwide financial fraud leads to the Southeast Asian haven for scam artists, thieves, and criminals: Metro Manila.

The film opened theatrically in South Korea on 21 December 2016, and received more than 7 million admissions nationwide. It grossed more than $48 million at the South Korean box office.

== Plot ==
Chairman Jin of One Network has been scamming tens of thousands of members with his eloquent speeches, charm, and powerful connections in both politics and government. His schemes have been highly successful. Kim Jae-myung, the head of the crime investigation team, has been tracking him for over six months. To tighten the net around Jin, Jae-myung pressures General Park, Jin's closest aide, to reveal the location of One Network's computer room and the chairman's lobbying ledger. Park, the mastermind behind the company's growth thanks to his exceptional programming skills and sharp intellect, realizes his plan is in jeopardy and quickly begins to strategize.

As Jae-myung closes in on Jin and the hidden forces supporting him, he sees an opportunity to take advantage of the situation and escape the increasing police pressure. Meanwhile, Jin becomes aware of a traitor among his inner circle and swiftly implements a new plan.

== Cast ==
- Lee Byung-hun as President Jin Hyun-pil
- Gang Dong-won as Kim Jae-myung
- Kim Woo-bin as Park Jang-goon
- Uhm Ji-won as Shin Gemma
- Oh Dal-su as Hwang Myung-joon
- Jin Kyung as Kim Mi-yong
- Jung Won-joong as Chief of the National Police Agency
- Yoo Yeon-soo as Bureau director Han
- Jo Hyun-chul as Ahn Kyung-nam
- Park Hae-soo as President Jin's bodyguard
- Woo Do-hwan as Man with baseball cap backwards
- Lee Soon-won as Criminal Investigation Team member 1
- Bae Jung-nam as Criminal Investigation Team member 2
- Jung Soo-gyu as Criminal Investigation Team member 3
- Kim Jung-woo as Criminal Investigation Team member 4
- Heo Hyung-gyi as Criminal Investigation Team member 5
- Joo Seok-tae as Peter Kim
- Lee Dong-jin as Male employee
- Kim Won-sik as Secretary Han
- Chang Ryul as One Network employee
- Kim Byeong-ok
- Park Jung-ja as Teacher Shin
- Monsour del Rosario as Senator of the Philippines
- Ian Ignacio as Bodyguard
- Diego Salvador as Bodyguard
- Lei Arellano as Bodyguard

== Production ==
Filming began on 23 April 2016. Filming took around 2 months time in the Philippines, including Binondo, Intramuros, Bulacan, and Cebu.

== Marketing ==
The film was showcased at the American Film Market held in Santa Monica, California from November 2–9. It has been sold to 31 countries including the United States, Canada, Australia, New Zealand, Italy, Taiwan, Thailand, Hong Kong, Singapore, the Philippines and other countries.

== Release and box office ==
The VIP Premiere of Master was held on 19 December 2016 at CGV Yeongdeungpo in Seoul.

Master was initially released in South Korea and was screened at 1,448 theatres. As per the Korea Box Office Information System (KOBIS) tallied by the Korean Film Council (KOFIC) on the first day of the release 393,247 viewers were attracted and took 66.3 percent of the total box office sales that day.

According to the Korean Film Council, Master topped the box office charts and became the most watched movie during the Christmas weekend of 2016 in South Korea. It was reported an audience of about 2.2 million viewed the movie. In the first five days since its opening on 21 December, the film has reached three million mark in ticket sales, earning 24.8 billion won (Approx: USD 20.5 million) in total.

As of early February 2017, Master has grossed US$49.81 million in South Korean box office and has sold 7.14 million tickets according to the Korean Film Council. Master ended up as the No. 11 bestselling film for 2016 in Korea.

== Awards and nominations ==
Year	Award	Category	Recipient	Result
2017	53rd Baeksang Arts Awards	Best Actor (Film)	Lee Byung-hun	Nominated
2017	53rd Baeksang Arts Awards	Best New Actor (Film)	Woo Do-hwan	Nominated
