= Park Jin-pyo =

South Korean film director

- Born: 1966 (age 59–60); Seoul, South Korea
- Education: Chung-Ang University
- Occupations: Film director, screenwriter, producer
- Years active: 1991–present
- Agent(s): Mega Monster (since 2021)

Korean name
- Hangul: 박진표
- RR: Bak Jinpyo
- MR: Pak Chinp'yo

Park Jin-pyo (born 1966) is a South Korean film director and screenwriter. He directed Too Young to Die (2002), You Are My Sunshine (2005), Voice of a Murderer (2007), Closer to Heaven (2009), and Love Forecast (2015).

== Career ==
Park Jin-pyo was born in Seoul in 1966. Upon graduation from Chung-Ang University's Film Department, he began working in television in 1991 as a documentary producer and director, eventually making over 30 documentaries for SBS and ITV.

In 2002, he made his narrative feature film debut with Too Young to Die, based on the real-life story of Park Chi-gyu and Lee Sun-ye, a man and woman who fell in love in their early seventies then rediscovered sex. It became controversial for its sensitive yet honest depiction of sex between the elderly couple (who played themselves), and was initially banned from release by the Korea Media Rating Board. Park said, "I wanted to break the preconception about the elderly. Even if the body ages, desire for sex and thirst for love do not fade away. I wanted to capture the "moment of love," and the audience accepted it as a cinematic expression of pure love. Some sees the (seven-minute sex) scene as a challenging of taboos, but I just wanted to deliver a love story." Too Young to Die drew praise domestically and internationally, and was invited to various film festivals, including Critics' Week at the 2002 Cannes Film Festival.

Park was among six directors who participated in the 2003 human rights-themed omnibus If You Were Me. His short film Tongue Tied focuses on a young boy whose education-obsessed parents want him to undergo tongue surgery that will purportedly enhance his ability to speak English.

His second feature You Are My Sunshine (2005) was a humanistic tearjerker about an innocent yet awkward farmer who falls for a dabang sex worker, then they later discover that she's HIV/AIDS-positive (the characters are again based on a real-life couple). Jeon Do-yeon and Hwang Jung-min won several acting awards for their lead performances, and Park was named Best Director at the 26th Blue Dragon Film Awards. Aside from the critical acclaim, the film ranked ninth overall on the year's box office chart, and became the highest grossing Korean melodrama at the time.

Park continued to blend reality and fiction in Voice of a Murderer (2007), based on an actual 1991 kidnapping case of a young boy whose distraught parents (played by Sul Kyung-gu and Kim Nam-joo) receive threatening phone calls for 41 days. The boy's parents granted Park permission to make the film, with which he hoped to advocate extending the statute of limitations for child abduction-murders to longer than the current 15 years. Regarding the perpetrator, Park said, "You know what, I really hope he gets to watch this film. We want to tell him that we have not forgotten his wrongdoings. I focused on expressing what the parents might have gone through. So that 'he' can watch it and feel something."

Closer to Heaven, another unconventional romance between a man with Lou Gehrig's disease and his funeral director wife, also became a commercial success in 2009 and garnered acting awards for Kim Myung-min and Ha Ji-won.

In a marked change from his previous work, Park's Love Forecast (2015) was a romantic comedy about a feisty weather reporter and her best friend of 18 years, a mild-mannered elementary school teacher (played by Moon Chae-won and Lee Seung-gi). He said he made the film in the hopes that it will "encourage young people to think more deeply about romantic relationships."

== Filmography ==
- Too Young to Die (2002) – director, producer
- "Tongue Tied" (from If You Were Me, 2003) – director, screenwriter
- You Are My Sunshine (2005) – director, screenwriter
- Voice of a Murderer (2007) – director, screenwriter
- Closer to Heaven (2009) – director, screenwriter
- My Burning Heart (2010) – executive producer
- Blood and Ties (2013) – executive producer
- Love Forecast (2015) – director, screenwriter
- Brave Citizen (2023) – director

== Awards ==
- 2002 21st Vancouver International Film Festival: Special Mention (Too Young to Die)
- 2002 5th Director's Cut Awards: Best New Director (Too Young to Die)
- 2005 26th Blue Dragon Film Awards: Best Director (You Are My Sunshine)
