= Maundy Thursday (film) =

- Theatrical poster
- Directed by: Song Hae-sung
- Written by: Jang Min-seok; Park Eun-yeong
- Based on: Our Happy Time by Gong Ji-young
- Produced by: Lee Seung-jae
- Starring: Lee Na-young; Gang Dong-won
- Cinematography: Kang Seung-gi
- Edited by: Park Gok-ji
- Music by: Lee Jae-jin
- Distributed by: Prime Entertainment
- Release date: September 14, 2006
- Running time: 120 minutes
- Country: South Korea
- Language: Korean
- Budget: US$4.2 million
- Box office: US$14.8 million

Maundy Thursday (Korean: 우리들의 행복한 시간; RR: Urideurui haengbokhan sigan; lit. 'Our Happy Time') is a 2006 South Korean romantic drama film directed by Song Hae-sung. Based on a bestselling novel by Gong Ji-young, it stars Lee Na-young and Gang Dong-won. The film is about a convicted murderer awaiting execution, and the bond he forms with a suicidal young woman who starts visiting him in jail every Thursday.

With 3,132,320 admissions, Maundy Thursday was the seventh-highest-grossing Korean film of 2006.

== Plot ==
Yu-jeong (Lee Na-young) has now attempted to commit suicide three times. Her disdain for her mother and indifference to the rest of the world isolates her from any chance for happiness. Yu-jeong's aunt Sister Monica is a nun, whooften goes to the prison to visit death row inmates. Sister Monica meets a new death row inmate who asks if he could meet her niece. Yu-jeong reluctantly agrees.

Yu-jeong and the death row inmate do not open up to each other immediately. Yu-jeong comes from a wealthy family and is a professor at a university. Yet, she has never known happiness since the age of 15 as a result of a sexual assault at the hands of her cousin. The inmate that she meets, named Yun-soo (Gang Dong-won), has had an even more traumatic childhood experience. He was abandoned by his parents at an early age and has had to live on the streets while caring for a younger brother. Eventually Yun-soo ends up involved in the criminal world and gets convicted for murder. With their disparate backgrounds, Yu-jeong and Yun-soo can still connect with each other, because both people have encountered grief like few others could possibly know. As they both regain the will to live through their weekly meetings, they must now deal with their feelings for each other and come to grips with their short time together.

== Cast ==
- Lee Na-young as Moon Yu-jeong
- Gang Dong-won as Jung Yun-soo
- Youn Yuh-jung as Sister Monica, Yu-Jeong's aunt
- Kang Shin-il as Manager Lee
- Jang Hyun-sung as Yu-chan, Yu-jeong's older brother
- Jung Young-sook as Yu-jeong's mother
- Kim Ji-young as Grandmother Park
- Kim Boo-seon as Hong
- Oh Kwang-rok as Death row inmate 2896
- Eun Won-jae as young Yun-soo (teen)
- Lee Byung-jun as young Yun-soo (child)
- Jung In-gi as Jung Min-seok
- Jung Jin as Tae-seong
- Yang Ik-june as Hwan-kyu
- Kim Jin-hyeok as prison guard A
- Kim Se-dong as prison guard Seo
- Lee Jae-gu as Teacher
- Oh Jung-se as Teacher Kim
- Kim So-hee as Yun-soo's mother
- Choi Jung-woo as uncle
- Kim Jae-man as gigolo
- Shin Young-jin as Yu-chan's wife
- Choi Moo-sung as Priest Kim
- Na Ki-soo as priest
- Kim Ja-young as housekeeper
- Choi Yong-min as President Choi

== Awards and nominations ==
2006 Chunsa Film Art Awards

- Best Screenplay – Jang Min-seok, Park Eun-yeong

2006 Blue Dragon Film Awards

- Nomination – Best Actress – Lee Na-young
- Nomination – Best Music – Lee Jae-jin

2007 Baeksang Arts Awards

- Nomination – Best Actor – Gang Dong-won
