= Cho Ui-seok =

South Korean filmmaker (born 1976)

- Born: January 1, 1976 (age 50); South Korea
- Education: Korea National University of Arts
- Occupations: Film director, screenwriter

Korean name
- Hangul: 조의석
- RR: Jo Uiseok
- MR: Cho Ŭisŏk

Cho Ui-seok (Korean: 조의석; born January 1, 1976) is a South Korean film director and screenwriter.

== Career ==
Cho made his debut with the action comedy Make It Big (2002). His third feature is the thriller Cold Eyes (2013). His fourth film was the star-studded thriller Master (2016), featuring Lee Byung-hun, Kang Dong-won and Kim Woo-bin. Released in December, it grossed US$34 million with 4.9 million total admissions, making it the No. 11 bestselling film for 2016 in Korea.

== Filmography ==
- Illusion (short film, 1998) - cinematographer
- We Can't Share A Toilet (short film, 1999) - cinematographer
- How Have You Been, Man-soo? (short film, 1999) - cinematographer
- Fanta Tropical (1999) - director, screenwriter
- Barking Dogs Never Bite (2000) - cinematography department
- Make It Big (2002) - director, screenwriter
- Psycho Drama (short film, 2002) - actor
- The World of Silence (2006) - director, script editor
- Cold Eyes (2013) - director, screenwriter
- Master (2016) - director
- Golden Slumber (2017) - screenwriter
