= Golden Slumber =

- Theatrical release poster
- Hangul: 골든 슬럼버
- RR: Goldeun seulleombeo
- MR: Koldŭn sŭllŏmbŏ
- Directed by: Noh Dong-seok
- Screenplay by: Lee Hae-jun; Noh Dong-seok; Cho Ui-seok
- Based on: Golden Slumber by Kōtarō Isaka
- Produced by: Song Dae-chan
- Starring: Gang Dong-won; Kim Eui-sung; Kim Sung-kyun; Kim Dae-myung; Han Hyo-joo
- Cinematography: Kim Jung-wook; Kim Tae-sung
- Edited by: Shin Min-kyung
- Music by: Kim Tae-seong
- Production company: Zip Cinema
- Distributed by: CJ Entertainment
- Release date: February 14, 2018
- Running time: 108 minutes
- Country: South Korea
- Language: Korean
- Budget: US$12.75 million
- Box office: US$10.7 million

Golden Slumber is a 2018 South Korean action thriller film directed by Noh Dong-seok, starring Gang Dong-won, Kim Eui-sung, Kim Sung-kyun, Kim Dae-myung, Han Hyo-joo and Yoon Kye-sang. It is based on the 2007 Japanese novel of the same name written by Kōtarō Isaka, previously filmed by Yoshihiro Nakamura in 2010. The film revolves around a deliveryman who has to run for his life after he is held responsible for an explosion causing the death of a presidential candidate.

The film was released in South Korean theaters on 14 February 2018 and in US theaters on a limited basis, on 16 February 2018.

== Plot ==
A presidential candidate is assassinated as part of a conspiracy, and a deliveryman has to flee for his life when he is framed and the evidence against him begins to accumulate.

== Cast ==
=== Main ===
- Gang Dong-won as Kim Gun-woo

A reliable and friendly package delivery worker who gains unexpected fame when he saves a pop star. However, his life changes when he is falsely accused of a terrorist attack that kills a presidential candidate.

- Kim Eui-sung as Mr. Min

A mysterious man who helps Gun-woo after he is accused of being an assassin.

- Kim Sung-kyun as Geum-chul

A computer repair man.

- Kim Dae-myung as Dong-gyu

A band-mate and a close friend of Gun-woo from college, who is now a divorce lawyer.

- Han Hyo-joo as Sun-young

A radio reporter who went to college with Gun-woo and also his first love.

=== Supporting ===
- Lee Hang-na as Team leader Do
- Park Hoon as Team leader Sun
- Kim Jae-young as Park Goon
- Jo Young-jin as Yoo Young-gook
- Jung Jae-sung as Jo Se-hyun
- Jeong Hyeong-seok as Detective Cha
- Ryu Hye-rin as Oyster woman
- Baek Bong-ki as Courier competition man
- Lee Sang-hee as Geum Cheol-cheo
- Yeom Hye-ran as Store middle-aged woman
- Yoo Jae-myung as Hwang Jin-ho
- Cha Soon-bae as Joint head of department

=== Special appearance ===
- Yoon Kye-sang as Moo-yeol

Gun-woo's friend who is tasked with capturing him.

- Kim You-jung as Soo-ah
- Namgoong Yeon as Radio DJ's voice
- Lee Jun-hyeok as Plastic surgeon
- Jung So-min as Yoo-mi
- Choi Woo-shik as Joo-ho

== Release ==
On January 17, 2018 a press conference was held at Apgujeong CGV. The main cast together with the director were present at the event.

The main poster for the movie was revealed on January 19, 2018. It was followed by the main trailer being unveiled on February 1, 2018.

Golden Slumber was released on February 14, 2018 in South Korea.

The film was released internationally in the U.S., Taiwan, Hong Kong, India, Australia, New Zealand, Singapore, Malaysia, Brunei, Thailand, Cambodia and the Philippines.

== Reception ==
=== Box office ===
In the first weekend of its release, Golden Slumber ranked third at the South Korean box office and sold 628,197 tickets. The film earned US$7.71 million during the first five days of its release. At the end of the second weekend, the movie suffered a 75% drop, grossing US$1.24 million by selling 158,217 tickets. After 12 days since its release, the film earned a total of US$10.23 million, attracting an audience of 1.3 million.

=== Critical response ===
Los Angeles Times noted, "The movie ultimately paints mass media cynicism as its real villain, noting how a sensationalist press and a gullible public allow amoral creeps to spread dangerous lies."

Film Journal International recognised the film as "A fast-paced, Jason Bourne-like Korean thriller, given depth by its theme of friendship".

National Post response for the film was "A confused but lively hour-and-three-quarters".

Yonhap News Agency reviewed the movie to have "all the right ingredients to become a box office hit"; however, "it appears to have lost balance when it tried to put in as many ingredients as possible."
