= Jang Jae-hyun =

South Korean filmmaker (born 1981)

- Born: 1981 (age 44–45); South Korea
- Education: Sungkyunkwan University; Korea National University of Arts
- Occupations: Film director Screenwriter

Korean name
- Hangul: 장재현
- RR: Jang Jaehyeon
- MR: Chang Chaehyŏn

Jang Jae-hyun (Korean: 장재현; born 1981) is a South Korean film director and screenwriter. He gained recognition through the blockbuster films The Priests (2015), Svaha: The Sixth Finger (2019), and Exhuma (2024).

== Education ==
After graduating from Sungkyunkwan University's Department of Film, he graduated from the Department of Film at Korea National University of Arts.

== Career ==
Jang served as an assistant director on the blockbuster period drama Masquerade (2012) before breaking out with the short 12th Assistant Deacon (2014) which won Best Film in The Extreme Nightmare section at the 13th Mise-en-scène Short Film Festival, and Best Director Award (Korean Competition For Shorts) at the 15th Jeonju International Film Festival in 2014. Based on the award-winning short, he made his first feature film The Priests (2015) - a supernatural mystery thriller, which was a hit with more than 5.4 million admissions. Jang said "I got a weird feeling when I saw a priest waiting anxiously for someone on the other side of a fast food restaurant window. The Priests started then."

== Filmography ==
=== Feature films ===
Year	Title	Credited as		Notes	Ref.
Year	Title	Director	Writer	Notes	Ref.
2011	Themselves	Assistant director	No		
2011	S.I.U.	Assistant director	No		
2012	Masquerade	Assistant director	No	Also actor	
2015	The Priests	Yes	Yes		
2017	House of the Disappeared	No	Yes		
2019	Svaha: The Sixth Finger	Yes	Yes		
2024	Exhuma	Yes	Yes		
2025	Big Deal	No	No	As actor	

=== Short films ===
Year	Title	Credited as		Notes	Ref.
Year	Title	Director	Writer	Notes	Ref.
2009	Maley from India	Yes	Yes	Also actor	
2010	Bus	Yes	Yes		
2014	12th Assistant Deacon	Yes	Yes		

== Awards and nominations ==
Award	Year	Category	Nominee(s) / work(s)	Result	Ref.
Baeksang Arts Awards	2024	Best Film	Exhuma	Nominated	
Baeksang Arts Awards	2024	Best Director – Film	Exhuma	Won	
Baeksang Arts Awards	2024	Best Screenplay – Film	Exhuma	Nominated	
Director's Cut Awards	2016	Best New Director	The Priests	Won	
Director's Cut Awards	2025	Best Director (Film)	Exhuma	Won	
Director's Cut Awards	2025	Best Screenplay (Film)	Exhuma	Won	
Jeonju International Film Festival	2014	Best Director Award	12th Assistant Deacon	Won	
