= List of South Korean films of 2016 =

This is a list of South Korean films that received a domestic theatrical release in 2016.

== Box office ==
The highest-grossing South Korean films released in 2016, by domestic box office gross revenue, are as follows:

Highest-grossing films released in 2016
Rank	Title	Distributor	Domestic gross
1	Train to Busan	Next Entertainment World	$75,780,595
2	A Violent Prosecutor	Showbox	$62,877,452
3	The Age of Shadows	Warner Bros. Korea	$49,825,226
4	Master	CJ Entertainment	$47,209,949
5	Tunnel	Showbox	$46,783,792
6	Luck Key	Showbox	$45,901,702
7	The Wailing	20th Century Fox Korea	$45,429,217
8	Operation Chromite	CJ Entertainment	$44,817,631
9	The Last Princess	Lotte Cultureworks	$36,104,430
10	The Handmaiden	CJ Entertainment	$31,755,748

== Released ==
Released	English title	Korean title	Director	Cast
7 January	Chasing	잡아야 산다	Oh In-chul	Kim Seung-woo, Kim Jung-tae, Hyuk
7 January	Don't Forget me	나를 잊지 말아요	Lee Yoon-jung	Jung Woo-sung, Kim Ha-neul
14 January	Like A French Film	프랑스 영화처럼	Shin Yeon-shik	Lee Young-ran, Jeon Ji-yoon, Kim Da-som
14 January	Mood of the Day	그날의 분위기	Jo Kyu-jang	Moon Chae-won, Yoo Yeon-seok, Jo Jae-yoon, Kim Seul-gi
21 January	A Melody to Remember	오빠 생각	Lee Han	Im Si-wan, Go Ah-sung
21 January	Half	하프	Kim Se-yeon	Ahn Yong-joon, Jung Yoo-seok,
27 January	Sori: Voice From The Heart	로봇, 소리	Lee Ho-jae	Lee Sung-min, Lee Hee-joon, Honey Lee
28 January	A Korean in Paris	파리의 한국남자	Jeon Soo-il	Cho Jae-hyun
28 January	Stay With Me	울보	Lee Jin-woo	
4 February	A Violent Prosecutor	검사외전	Lee Il-hyung	Hwang Jung-min, Kang Dong-won, Lee Sung-min
4 February	Bad Guys Always Die	나쁜놈은 반드시 죽는다	Sun Hao	Son Ye-jin, Chen Bolin
11 February	Malice	멜리스	Kim Yong-woon	Hong Soo-ah
11 February	The Lightning Man's Secret	번개맨	Cho Keun-hyun	Jung Hyun-jin, Luna
17 February	Like for Likes	좋아해줘	Park Hyun-jin	Lee Mi-yeon, Choi Ji-woo, Yoo Ah-in
18 February	Dongju: The Portrait of a Poet	동주	Lee Joon-ik	Kang Ha-neul, Park Jung-min
24 February	Spirits' Homecoming	귀향	Cho Jung-rae	Kang Han-na, Choi Ri
24 February	Pure Love	순정	Lee Eun-hee	Do Kyung-soo, Kim So-hyun
25 February	A Man and A Woman	남과 여	Lee Yoon-ki	Jeon Do-yeon, Gong Yoo
25 February	El Condor Pasa	엘꼰도르 빠사	Song Jae-yong	Kang Ye-won
3 March	Elephant in the Room	방 안의 코끼리	Kwon Chil-in, Park Soo-young, Kwon Ho-young	Kwak Si-yang, Mi Ram, Kwon Yul
3 March	Musudan	무수단	Goo Mo	Lee Ji-ah, Kim Min-jun
3 March	No Tomorrow	섬. 사라진 사람들	Lee Ji-seung	Park Hyo-joo, Bae Seong-woo, Ryu Jun-yeol
3 March	Snow Paths	설행_눈길을 걷다	Kim Hee-jung	Kim Tae-hoon, Park So-dam, Choi Moo-sung
10 March	Hiya	히야	Kim Ji-yeon	Ahn Bo-hyun, Hoya, Park Chul-min
10 March	Missing You	널 기다리며	Mo Hong-jin	Shim Eun-kyung, Yoon Je-moo, Kim Sung-oh
24 March	Kkangchi	깡치	Jeon Pil-jin	Son Woo-hyuk, Kwon Yoo-jin, Park Jung-soo
24 March	One Way Trip	글로리데이	Choi Jeong-yeol	Ji Soo, Suho, Ryu Jun-yeol, Kim Hee-chan
28 March	Upstanding Man	(일어서는 인간)	Kim Mi-yung	Heo Ji-won, Jeon Soo-ji
30 March	Eclipse	커터	Jung Hee-sung	Choi Tae-joon, Kim Shi-hoo
31 March	Su Saek	수색역	Choi Seung-yeon	Maeng Se-chang, Gong Myung, Lee Tae-hwan, Lee Jin-sung
7 April	Insane	날,보러와요	Lee Chul-ha	Kang Ye-won, Lee Sang-yoon
7 April	Steel Flower	스틸 플라워	Park Suk-young	Jeong Ha-dam
13 April	Fourth Place	4등	Jung Ji-woo	Yoo Jae Sang, Park Hae-joon
13 April	Love, Lies	해어화	Park Heung-sik	Han Hyo-joo, Chun Woo-hee, Yoo Yeon-seok
13 April	Time Renegades	시간이탈자	Kwak Jae-young	Im Soo-jung, Jo Jung-suk, Lee Jin-wook
14 April	Two Rooms, Two Nights	두 개의 연애	David Cho	Kim Jae-wook, Chae Jung-an, Park Gyu-ri
20 April	The Last Ride	위대한 소원	Nam Dae-joong	Ryu Deok-hwan, Kim Dong-young, Ahn Jae-hong
21 April	End of Winter	철원기행	Kim Dae-hwan	Moon Chang-kil, Lee Young-ran
5 May	Midnight in Seoul	서울야행	Kwon Joong-mok	Seo Hyo-rim, Park Sang-hoon
5 May	Overman	초인	Seo Eun Young	Kim Go-woon, Kim Jung-hyun
5 May	Phantom Detective	탐정 홍길동: 사라진 마을	Jo Sung-hee	Lee Je-hoon, Kim Sung-kyun, Go Ara
12 May	I Am Trash	나는 쓰레기다	Lee Sang-woo	Kwan Bum-tack, Lee Sang-woo, Yang Myoung-hoen, Park Hyung-bin
12 May	The Wailing	곡성	Na Hong-jin	Kwak Do-won, Hwang Jung-min, Chun Woo-hee
19 May	Canola	계춘할망	Chang	Youn Yuh-jung, Kim Go-eun
1 June	The Handmaiden	아가씨	Park Chan-wook	Kim Min-hee, Kim Tae-ri, Ha Jung-woo
23 June	The Truth Beneath	비밀은 없다	Lee Kyoung-mi	Son Ye-jin, Kim Joo-hyuk
6 July	Seondal: The Man Who Sells the River	봉이 김선달	Park Dae-min	Yoo Seung-ho
20 July	Train to Busan	부산행	Yeon Sang-ho	Gong Yoo, Jung Yu-mi, Ma Dong-seok, Kim Su-an
3 August	The Last Princess	덕혜옹주	Hur Jin-ho	Son Ye-jin, Park Hae-il
10 August	The Tunnel	터널	Kim Seong-hun	Ha Jung-woo, Bae Doona
13 October	Luck Key	럭키	Lee Gae-byok	Yoo Hae-jin, Lee Joon
7 September	The Age of Shadows	밀정	Kim Jee-woon	Song Kang-ho, Gong Yoo, Han Ji-min
18 September	Asura: The City of Madness	아수라	Kim Sung-su	Jung Woo-sung, Hwang Jung-min
22 September	Duel: Final Round	대결	Shin Jai-ho	Lee Joo-seung, Oh Ji-ho, Lee Jung-jin, Shin Jung-geun
9 November	Split	스플릿	Choi Kook-hee	Yoo Ji-tae, Lee Jung-hyun, Lee David
16 November	Vanishing Time: A Boy Who Returned	가려진 시간	Um Tae-hwa	Kang Dong-won, Shin Eun-soo
23 November	My Annoying Brother	형	Kwon Soo-kyung	Jo Jung-suk, Do Kyung-soo, Park Shin-hye
30 November	Missing	미씽: 사라진 여자	Lee Eon-hee	Uhm Ji-won, Gong Hyo-jin
30 November	Derailed	두 남자	Lee Seong-tae	Ma Dong-seok, Choi Min-ho
14 December	Life Risking Romance	목숨 건 연애	Song Min-gyu	Ha Ji-won, Chen Bolin, Chun Jung-myung
21 December	Master	마스터	Cho Ui-seok	Lee Byung-hun, Kang Dong-won, Kim Woo-bin
