= List of 2016 box office number-one films in South Korea =

The following is a list of 2016 box office number-one films in South Korea. When the number-one film in gross is not the same as the number-one film in admissions, both are listed.

== Number-one films ==
†	This implies the highest-grossing movie of the year.

#	Date	Film	Gross	Notes
1	January 3, 2016	The Himalayas	US$8.55 million	
2	January 10, 2016	The Good Dinosaur	US$3.34 million	
3	January 17, 2016	The Revenant	US$4.7 million	
4	January 24, 2016	The Revenant	US$2.81 million	
5	January 31, 2016	Kung Fu Panda 3	US$9.11 million	
6	February 7, 2016	A Violent Prosecutor	US$15.73 million	
7	February 14, 2016	A Violent Prosecutor	US$9.02 million	
8	February 21, 2016	Deadpool	US$7.42 million	
9	February 28, 2016	Spirits’ Homecoming	US$6.4 million	
10	March 6, 2016	Spirits’ Homecoming	US$4.01 million	
11	March 13, 2016	Zootopia	US$2.3 million	
12	March 20, 2016	Zootopia	US$2.5 million	
13	March 27, 2016	Batman v Superman: Dawn of Justice	US$8.4 million	
14	April 3, 2016	Batman v Superman: Dawn of Justice	US$2.5 million	
15	April 10, 2016	Insane	US$2.3 million	
16	April 17, 2016	Time Renegades	US$2.5 million	
17	April 24, 2016	Time Renegades	US$1.7 million	
18	May 1, 2016	Captain America: Civil War	US$21 million	
19	May 8, 2016	Captain America: Civil War	US$11.7 million	
20	May 15, 2016	The Wailing	US$13.1 million	
21	May 22, 2016	The Wailing	US$9.5 million	
22	May 29, 2016	X-Men: Apocalypse	US$8.5 million	
23	June 5, 2016	The Handmaiden	US$9.1 million	
24	June 12, 2016	The Jungle Book	US$5.7 million	
25	June 19, 2016	The Jungle Book	US$4.6 million	
26	June 26, 2016	Independence Day: Resurgence	US$5.2 million	
27	July 3, 2016	Familyhood	US$4.8 million	
28	July 10, 2016	Finding Dory	US$6.2 million	
29	July 17, 2016	Now You See Me 2	US$8.0 million	
30	July 24, 2016	Train to Busan †	US$24.0 million	
31	July 31, 2016	Operation Chromite	US$13.5 million	
32	August 7, 2016	The Last Princess	US$8.8 million	
33	August 14, 2016	The Tunnel	US$13.8 million	
34	August 21, 2016	The Tunnel	US$8.5 million	
35	August 28, 2016	The Tunnel	US$5 million	
36	September 4, 2016	The Tunnel	US$2.6 million	
37	September 11, 2016	The Age of Shadows	US$12 million	
38	September 18, 2016	The Age of Shadows	US$15.4 million	
39	September 25, 2016	The Age of Shadows	US$3.5 million	
40	October 2, 2016	Asura: The City of Madness	US$8.3 million	
41	October 9, 2016	Miss Peregrine's Home for Peculiar Children	US$5.6 million	
42	October 16, 2016	Luck Key	US$12.1 million	
43	October 23, 2016	Luck Key	US$10.9 million	
44	October 30, 2016	Doctor Strange	US$18 million	
45	November 6, 2016	Doctor Strange	US$8.2 million	
46	November 13, 2016	Doctor Strange	US$4.4 million	
47	November 20, 2016	Fantastic Beasts and Where to Find Them	US$10.6 million	
48	November 27, 2016	Fantastic Beasts and Where to Find Them	US$6.7 million	
49	December 4, 2016	My Annoying Brother	US$20.6 million	
50	December 11, 2016	Pandora	US$7.9 million	
51	December 18, 2016	Pandora	US$6.9 million	
52	December 25, 2016	Master	US$15.8 million	
53	January 1, 2017	Master	US$9.7 million	

== Highest-grossing films ==
Highest-grossing films of 2016 (by admissions)
Rank	Title	Country	Admissions	Domestic gross
1.	Train to Busan	South Korea	11,565,479	US$81.6 million
2.	A Violent Prosecutor	South Korea	9,707,581	US$67.7 million
3.	Captain America: Civil War	United States	8,677,249	US$63.7 million
4.	The Age of Shadows	South Korea	7,500,420	US$53.7 million
5.	The Tunnel	South Korea	7,120,508	US$50.4 million
6.	Operation Chromite	South Korea	7,049,643	US$48.3 million
7.	Luck Key	South Korea	6,975,291	US$49.4 million
8.	The Wailing	South Korea	6,879,908	US$48.9 million
9.	The Last Princess	South Korea	5,599,229	US$38.9 million
10.	Doctor Strange	United States	5,446,241	US$41.6 million

Highest-grossing domestic films of 2016 (by admissions)
Rank	Title	Admissions	Domestic gross
1.	Train to Busan	11,565,479	US$81.6 million
2.	A Violent Prosecutor	9,707,581	US$67.7 million
3.	The Age of Shadows	7,500,420	US$53.7 million
4.	The Tunnel	7,120,508	US$50.4 million
5.	Operation Chromite	7,049,643	US$48.3 million
6.	Luck Key	6,975,291	US$49.4 million
7.	The Wailing	6,879,908	US$48.9 million
8.	The Last Princess	5,599,229	US$38.9 million
9.	Master	4,935,297	US$34.9 million
10.	Pandora	4,313,566	US$29.7 million

== See also ==
- List of South Korean films of 2016
