= 53rd Grand Bell Awards =

2016 edition of award ceremony

- Date: December 27, 2016
- Site: Sejong University Convention Center, Seoul

Television coverage
- Network: YouTube; Facebook; Afreeca TV

The 53rd Grand Bell Awards (Korean: 대종상 영화제; RR: Daejongsang Yeonghwajae), also known as Daejong Film Awards, are determined and presented annually by The Motion Pictures Association of Korea for excellence in film in South Korea. The Grand Bell Awards were first presented in 1962 and have gained prestige as the Korean equivalent of the American Academy Awards.

== Nominations and winners ==
Nominations were announced December 16, 2016.

(Winners denoted in bold)

Best Film	Best Director
**Inside Men**; The Age of Shadows; The Last Princess; The Tiger: An Old Hunter's Tale; The Wailing	**Woo Min-ho - Inside Men**; Kim Jee-woon - The Age of Shadows; Hur Jin-ho - The Last Princess; Lee Il-hyung - A Violent Prosecutor; Na Hong-jin - The Wailing
Best Actor	Best Actress
**Lee Byung-hun - Inside Men**; Song Kang-ho - The Age of Shadows; Choi Min-sik - The Tiger: An Old Hunter's Tale; Ha Jung-woo - The Tunnel; Kwak Do-won - The Wailing	**Son Ye-jin - The Last Princess**; Youn Yuh-jung - Canola; Kang Ye-won - Insane; Shim Eun-kyung - Missing You; Bae Doona - The Tunnel; Lee Tae-ran - Twenty Again
Best Supporting Actor	Best Supporting Actress
**Uhm Tae-goo - The Age of Shadows**; Lee Geung-young - Inside Men; Yoon Je-moon - The Last Princess; Oh Dal-su - The Tunnel; Hwang Jung-min - The Wailing	**Ra Mi-ran - The Last Princess**; Han Ji-min - The Age of Shadows; Lee El - Inside Men; Son Sook - Spirits' Homecoming; Chun Woo-hee - The Wailing
Best New Actor	Best New Actress
**Jung Ga-ram - 4th Place**; Choi Min-ho - Canola; Lee Sang-yoon - Insane; Yoo Jae-sang - 4th Place; Kim Hee-jin - Operation Chromite	**Kim Hwan-hee - The Wailing**; Lee Seul-bi - Canola; Kang Ha-na - Spirits' Homecoming; Choi Ri - Spirits' Homecoming
Best New Director	Best Screenplay
**Cho Jung-rae - Spirits' Homecoming**; Missing You; A Violent Prosecutor	**Woo Min-ho - Inside Men**; The Age of Shadows; 4th Place; The Tiger: An Old Hunter's Tale; The Wailing
Best Cinematography	Best Editing
**Hong Kyung-pyo - The Wailing**; The Age of Shadows; Asura: The City of Madness; Inside Men; The Map Against the World	**Kim Sun-min - The Wailing**; The Age of Shadows; Asura: The City of Madness; Inside Men; The Tunnel
Best Art Direction	Best Lighting
**Jo Hwa-sung - The Age of Shadows**; Asura: The City of Madness; The Last Princess; The Tiger: An Old Hunter's Tale; The Wailing	**Kim Chan-ho - The Wailing**; The Age of Shadows; Asura: The City of Madness; Inside Men; The Last Princess
Best Costume Design	Best Music
**Kwon Yoo-jin** and **Im Seung-hee** - The Last Princess; The Age of Shadows; Map Against the World; Operation Chromite; The Tiger: An Old Hunter's Tale	**Choi Yong-rak** and **Jo Sung-woo** - The Last Princess; The Age of Shadows; Inside Men; Operation Chromite; The Wailing
High Technology Special Award	Best Sound Recording
**Jo Yong-suk**, **Hwang Hyo-kyun**, **Kwak Tae-yong** and **Kim Tae-eui** - The Tiger: An Old Hunter's Tale; The Last Princess; Operation Chromite; The Tunnel; The Wailing	**Kim Shin-yong** and **Park Yong-gi** - The Wailing; The Age of Shadows; Asura: The City of Madness; Inside Men; Operation Chromite; The Tiger: An Old Hunter's Tale
Best Planning	Popularity Award
**Kim Won-guk** - Inside Men; 4th Place; The Last Princess; Spirits' Homecoming; The Wailing	**Lee Beom-soo** - Operation Chromite
New Rising Award	Lifetime Achievement Award
**Kim Hee-jin** - Operation Chromite; **Choi Ri** - Spirits' Homecoming	**Yoon Sam-yook**
