= Karma (South Korean TV series) =

2025 crime thriller series

- Promotional poster
- Hangul: 악연
- Lit.: Ill-fated Relationship
- RR: Agyeon
- MR: Agyŏn
- Genre: Crime thriller
- Based on: Karma by Choi Hee-seon
- Written by: Lee Il-hyung
- Directed by: Lee Il-hyung
- Starring: Park Hae-soo; Shin Min-a; Lee Hee-joon; Kim Sung-kyun; Lee Kwang-soo; Gong Seung-yeon
- Music by: Hwang Sang-jun
- Opening theme: "We Met By Chance" by Hwang Sang-jun
- Country of origin: South Korea
- Original language: Korean
- No. of episodes: 6

Production
- Executive producers: Yoon Jong-bin; Park Ho-sik; Jang Se-jeong
- Producer: Yang Jung-eun
- Cinematography: Yoo Eok; Jo Wang-seop
- Editors: Kim Sang-beom; Kim Ho-bin
- Running time: 47–61 minutes
- Production companies: Moonlight Film; Baram Pictures; Kakao Entertainment

Original release
- Network: Netflix
- Release: April 4, 2025

Karma (Korean: 악연) is a 2025 South Korean crime thriller television series written and directed by Lee Il-hyung, and starring Park Hae-soo, Shin Min-a, Lee Hee-joon, Kim Sung-kyun, Lee Kwang-soo, and Gong Seung-yeon. Based on the Kakao webtoon of the same name by Choi Hee-seon, the series is about people who are entangled in an unexpected ill-fated relationship and destroy each other while pursuing their own desires. It was released on Netflix on April 4, 2025.

== Plot ==
Park Jae-young has heavy debts with a loan shark. He hires Korean Chinese coworker Jang Gil-ryong to kill his father, Park Dong-sik, in hopes of getting the life insurance payout. Gil-ryong murders Dong-sik, but has to dispose the body elsewhere instead of staging a hit-and-run.

Traditional medicine doctor Han Sang-hun and girlfriend Lee Yu-jeong are driving home after a romantic getaway, when Sang-hun hits Dong-sik's body with his car. Sang-hun believes he killed Dong-sik, and he almost kills Kim Beom-jun, a nearby witness. Sang-hun has Beom-jun help him bury Dong-sik in the mountainside and pays Beom-jun for his silence.

Dong-sik's body is found by a hiker, but Jae-yeong fails to get the insurance payout as the investigation is ongoing. Gil-ryong threatens Jae-yeong with violence, demanding payment immediately as he needs to flee the country since he was seen at the scene of the crime and killed a police officer who was following him.

Sang-hun checks his car's dashcam and discovers that Beom-jun staged the accident. He informs Yu-jeong, who turns out to be working a con with Beom-jun. Yu-jeong and Beom-jun kidnap Sang-hun, and Sang-hun kills Yu-jeong before Beom-jun kills Sang-hun. The murders are photographed by the employees of private detective Hwang Cheol-mok, who had been hired by Sang-hun's wife to find evidence of his infidelity. Cheol-mok reports the murders and a manhunt starts for Beom-jun.

Beom-jun has also been working with Gil-ryong, his friend from prison. Beom-jun helped Gil-ryong murder Dong-sik in return for part of the payout, and took the body away for the con with Sang-hun.

Jae-yeong arranges to meet Gil-ryong, intending to murder him. Beom-jun follows them, but realizes at a police checkpoint that he is wanted for murder. Jae-yeong takes Gil-ryong to an abandoned building and attacks him, but Gil-ryong overpowers him. Beom-jun arrives and decides to take Jae-yeong's identity. Beom-jun kills Gil-ryong and Jae-yeong and sets the building on fire.

A severely burned Beom-jun is brought to the hospital, where he claims to be Jae-yeong and tells the police that he was kidnapped. He is tended to by Dr. Lee Ju-yeon, who was gang raped by Jae-yeong and other boys when they were teenagers. Ju-yeon follows Beom-jun when he leaves the hospital, intending to kill him, but her fiancé Dr. Yoon stops her by asking her not to throw her life away. Beom-jun later remembers Ju-yeon from school; he was friends with Yu-jeong, who hated Ju-yeon, and he suggested that Yu-jeong arrange the gang rape.

The police realize that Beom-jun's statement doesn't match the crime scene. Beom-jun tries to flee, but is picked up by the loan shark who's looking for Jae-yeong. Yoon is the surgeon working for the loan shark to harvest organs, and he starts work on Beom-jun, ignoring his claims of mistaken identity.

Cheol-mok visits Ju-yeon to tell her an update about Jae-yeong, but Ju-yeon decides she does not need to know, as she has let go of the past.

== Cast and characters ==
=== Main ===
- Park Hae-soo as Kim Beom-jun
- Shin Min-a as Lee Ju-yeon
- Lee Hee-joon as Park Jae-yeong
- Kim Sung-kyun as Jang Gil-ryong
- Lee Kwang-soo as Han Sang-hun
- Gong Seung-yeon as Lee Yu-jeong

=== Special appearance ===
- Kim Nam-gil as Yoon Jeong-min
- Park Ho-san as Hwang Cheol-mok
- Park Bo-yeon as Sang-hoon's wife

== Episodes ==
No.	Title	Directed by	Written by	Original release date
1	"The Man With Loan Shark Debts"; Transliteration: "Sachae bijui namja" (Korean: 사채 빚의 남자)	Lee Il-hyung	Lee Il-hyung	April 4, 2025
2	"The Man Who Disposed of a Body"; Transliteration: "Sichereul yugihan namja" (Korean: 시체를 유기한 남자)	Lee Il-hyung	Lee Il-hyung	April 4, 2025
3	"The Unrighteous"; Transliteration: "Joe jieun jadeul" (Korean: 죄 지은 자들)	Lee Il-hyung	Lee Il-hyung	April 4, 2025
4	"The Woman Trapped in the Past"; Transliteration: "Sangcheo badeun yeoja" (Korean: 상처 받은 여자)	Lee Il-hyung	Lee Il-hyung	April 4, 2025
5	"Rewind"; Transliteration: "Siganyeokaeng" (Korean: 시간역행)	Lee Il-hyung	Lee Il-hyung	April 4, 2025
6	"Karma"; Transliteration: "Akyeon" (Korean: 악연)	Lee Il-hyung	Lee Il-hyung	April 4, 2025

== Production ==
=== Development ===
In July 2023, it was reported that the Kakao Webtoon Ill-fated Relationship by Choi Hee-seon, which was serialized in 2019, would be made into a drama with six episodes and is directed and written by Lee Il-hyung, who helmed A Violent Prosecutor (2016) and Remember (2022). Moonlight Film, Baram Pictures, and Kakao Entertainment managed the production.

=== Casting ===
In August 2023, Star News reported that both Shin Min-a and Park Hae-soo would be starring in the series. In response to the report, both agencies of Shin and Park stated that they were positively reviewing the offer. A month later, Netflix confirmed the ensemble cast of the crime thriller series with Park, Shin, Lee Hee-joon, Kim Sung-kyun, Lee Kwang-soo, and Gong Seung-yeon.

== Release ==
Karma was released exclusively on Netflix on April 4, 2025.

== Reception ==
=== Critical response ===
On the review aggregator website Rotten Tomatoes, 83% of 6 critics' reviews are positive, with an average rating of 7.2/10. Joel Keller of Decider recommended the series, praising its potential for "intertwining plots" while noting that its effectiveness would depend on the pacing of their development.

=== Accolades ===
Award ceremony	Year	Category	Nominee	Result	Ref.
Blue Dragon Series Awards	2025	Best Drama	Karma	Nominated	
Blue Dragon Series Awards	2025	Best Actor	Park Hae-soo	Nominated	
Blue Dragon Series Awards	2025	Best Supporting Actor	Lee Kwang-soo	Won	
Blue Dragon Series Awards	2025	Best Supporting Actress	Gong Seung-yeon	Nominated	
Director's Cut Awards	2026	Best Actor (Drama)	Park Hae-soo	Nominated	
Director's Cut Awards	2026	Best Actor (Drama)	Lee Hee-joon	Nominated	
Director's Cut Awards	2026	Best New Actress (Drama)	Gong Seung-yeon	Nominated	
Director's Cut Awards	2026	Best New Actor (Drama)	Lee Kwang-soo	Nominated	
