= Operation Chromite (film) =

2016 South Korean war film

- Theatrical release poster
- Hangul: 인천상륙작전
- Hanja: 仁川上陸作戰
- Lit.: Operation Inchon Landing
- RR: Incheon sangnyuk jakjeon
- MR: Inch'ŏn sangnyuk chakchŏn
- Directed by: John H. Lee
- Written by: John H. Lee; Lee Man-hee; Sean Richard Dulake
- Produced by: Jeong Tae-won; Kyu C. Lee
- Starring: Lee Jung-jae; Lee Beom-soo; Liam Neeson; Jin Se-yeon
- Cinematography: Park Jang-hyuk
- Edited by: Steve M. Choe
- Music by: Lee Dong-joon
- Production company: Taewon Entertainment
- Distributed by: Finecut (present); CJ Entertainment (South Korea)
- Release date: July 27, 2016 (South Korea)
- Running time: 111 minutes
- Country: South Korea
- Languages: Korean; English
- Budget: US$12.7 million
- Box office: US$50.9 million

Operation Chromite (Korean: 인천상륙작전) or Battle for Incheon: Operation Chromite in US, is a 2016 South Korean spy war film co-written and directed by John H. Lee. It is a fiction based on a true story of Operation X-ray by ROK Navy Intelligence Unit and Operation Trudy Jackson by US Military Intelligence Unit (including KLO and CIA), depicts espionage which took charge for preparatory stage of Operation Chromite (Incheon Landing Operation, Battle of Inchon) in Korean War.

Produced by Taewon Entertainment, presented by Finecut. In South Korea, the film was released on 27 July 2016, the anniversary of the signing of the Korean War armistice agreement, and was distributed by CJ Entertainment.

== Plot ==
In 1950, just a few months after North Korean forces have overrun most of South Korea, an American-led UN coalition is deployed to Korea to aid the struggling South Koreans. General Douglas MacArthur devises a secret plan to attack behind enemy lines at the port city of Incheon. The risky strategy is opposed by leaders of the other military branches, forcing MacArthur to devise a clandestine operation to gather essential information from within occupied Incheon by coordinating a weeklong South Korean intelligence operation known as "X-ray".

The linchpin of this top-secret incursion, Captain Jang Hak-Soo of the ROK Navy Intelligence Unit (a former Korean People's Army officer who defected to South Korea after seeing his father executed in front of him by his fellow communist officers), and seven members of the X-Ray unit disguise themselves as a Korean People's Army inspection unit and infiltrate the North Korean command center in Incheon, coordinated by the Soviet-trained commander Lim Gye-Jin, a protégé of Kim Il Sung. Their prime objective is to determine the placement of North Korean defenses (such as mines and artillery) and the tactical characteristics of the Incheon harbor (notorious for swift currents and major tidal surges), and secure a lighthouse crucial to the landing's success.

Immediately suspicious of Jang's "inspection mission", Lim attempts to impede his comrade's investigation and orders his staff to monitor the new arrivals closely. The U.S. command relays MacArthur's orders to obtain navigation charts showing naval mine placements in the harbor and prepare a strategy to assist the coalition forces with landing an amphibious assault in a narrow two-hour window between tides. When contacts within the South Korean military intelligence unit known as KLO (Korea Liaison Office, predecessor to present-day South Korean Headquarters of Intelligence Detachment, or HID) warn Jang that time is running out to successfully complete the mission, he pushes his group to extremes. Meanwhile, in Tokyo, MacArthur prepares Operation Chromite, an invasion force of 75,000 UN troops and over 200 warships, to imminently depart for the Korean Peninsula.

== Cast ==
- Lee Jung-jae as Jang Hak-soo
- Lee Beom-soo as Lim Gye-jin
- Liam Neeson as General Douglas MacArthur
- Jin Se-yeon as Han Chae-seon
- Jung Joon-ho as Seo Jin-chul
- Kim Byeong-ok as Choi Suk-joong
- Park Chul-min as Nam Ki-sung
- Jon Gries as Hoyt Vandenberg
- Gil Geum-sung as Chun Dal-joong
- Shin Soo-hang as Kang Bong-po
- Kim Hee-jin as Ryu Jang-choon
- Jung Min-ji as Ok Gil-ryun
- Naya as Yeo Ga-soo
- Lee Choong-goo as Hwa-gyoon
- Sung Hyuk as Song Sang-deuk
- Kim Ki-bum as Kwak Tae-duk
- Go Yoon as commando
- Jang Joon-hak as Yang Pan-dong
- Sean Richard Dulake as Lt. Col. Edward L. Rowny
- Justin Rupple as Alexander Haig
- Jin Yong-ok as Jo In-gook
- Park Jung-won as Ri Kyung-shik
- Yang Bum as Ham Kwang-suk
- Lee Hae-joon as Ji Jin-pyo
- Josie Bissett as Jean MacArthur
- Yoon Suk-jin as Do Hong-gyoo
- Kim Joong-hee as Joo Hyun-pil
- Yun Da-yeong as Gye Eun-sook
- Kim Se-jung as Uhm Gi-soon
- Park Sung-woong as Park Nam-chul (cameo)
- Kim Sun-a as Kim Hwa-young (cameo)
- Kim Young-ae as Na Jung-nim (cameo)
- Choo Sung-hoon as Baek San (cameo)
- Lee Won-jong as Kim Il Sung (cameo)
- Jung Kyung-soon as Jung Sun-sil (cameo)

=== English dubbing ===
- Song Sang-deuk – Sean Chiplock
- Darrel Delfin

== Reception ==
The film was number-one on its opening at the South Korean box office, grossing US$18.47 million. with around seven million tickets sold as of 5 December 2016. It grossed US$50 million worldwide.

In the United Kingdom, it was 2017's best-selling foreign language film on home video, above Your Name in second place.

On review aggregation website Rotten Tomatoes, the film holds an approval rating of 40% based on 20 reviews, with an average rating of 5/10. At Metacritic, the film has a weighted average score of 50 out of 100, based on 8 critics, indicating "mixed or average reviews".

== Extended cut ==
A South Korean release of the Blu-Ray version put the extended cut at 141 minutes.

== Sequel ==
The Battle of Jangsari 9.15, a sequel to the film Chromite, was released in 2019, the second part of a trilogy. The film covers a later small attack at Jangsari, intended to draw North Korean attention from Inchon.

== Accolades ==
Award	Category	Recipient	Result	Citation(s)
53rd Grand Bell Awards	Best New Actor	Kim Hee-jin	Nominated	
53rd Grand Bell Awards	Best Costume Design	Oh Sang-jin	Nominated	
53rd Grand Bell Awards	Best Music	Lee Dong-jun	Nominated	
53rd Grand Bell Awards	Best Sound Recording		Nominated	
53rd Grand Bell Awards	Best Visual Effect	Moon Byung-yong, Cho E-suck	Nominated	
53rd Grand Bell Awards	Popularity Award	Lee Beom-soo	Won	
53rd Grand Bell Awards	New Rising Star Award	Kim Hee-jin (Tied with Choi Ri of Spirits' Homecoming)	Won	
24th Korean Culture and Entertainment Awards	Women's Best Actor Award	Jin Se yeon	Won	
