= Kim Si-eun =

Kim Si-eun may refer to:

- Kim Si-eun (born 1887), South Korean independence activist
- Kim Si-eun (born 1987), South Korean actress
- Kim Si-eun (actress, born 1999)
- Kim Si-eun (actress, born 2000)
- Kim Si-eun (born 2008), South Korean actress
