= Here's My Plan =

2021 South Korean television series

- Promotional poster
- Also known as: Got a Goal
- Hangul: 목표가 생겼다
- Lit.: I Have a Goal
- RR: Mokpyoga saenggyeotda
- MR: Mokp'yoga saenggyŏtta
- Genre: Family drama Romance; Revenge
- Created by: Hong Seok-woo
- Written by: Ryu Sol-ah
- Directed by: Shim Soo-yeon
- Starring: Kim Hwan-hee; Ryu Soo-young; Kim Do-hoon; Lee Young-jin
- Composer: Kim Joon-seok
- Country of origin: South Korea
- Original language: Korean
- No. of episodes: 4

Production
- Producers: Shin In-soo; Lee Seong-jin; Hwang Dong-seob
- Running time: 60 minutes
- Production companies: Big Ocean ENM; Super Moon Pictures

Original release
- Network: MBC TV
- Release: May 19 – May 27, 2021

Here's My Plan (Korean: 목표가 생겼다) is a 2021 South Korean television series starring Kim Hwan-hee, Ryu Soo-young, Kim Do-hoon and Lee Young-jin. The screenplay won the award for outstanding work at the 2020 MBC Drama Screenplay Contest and was selected with the highest praise from judges. It aired on MBC TV from May 19–27, 2021.

== Synopsis ==
The story of a young woman who believes that her whole life has been unfortunate plans the "Happiness Ruining Project" to avenge those who made her life unhappy.

== Cast ==
=== Main ===
- Kim Hwan-hee as Lee So-hyun

A young woman who drops out of high school and lives by pickpocketing to support herself.

- Ryu Soo-young as Lee Jae-young

The owner of a small chicken restaurant called Happy Chicken who is friendly and kind-hearted.

- Kim Do-hoon as Jo Yoon-ho

A part-time delivery worker at Happy Chicken.

- Lee Young-jin as Kim Yoo-mi

So-hyun's mother who is dependent on alcohol and is indifferent to her daughter.

=== Supporting ===
- Kim Yi-kyung as Hee-jin

So-hyun's friend.

- Lee Jin-hee as Kim Bok-hee

The caregiver of Yoon-ho's grandmother.

- Park Seung-tae as Hye-soon

Yoon-ho's grandmother who has dementia.

- Lee Si-woo as Jun-sik

A high school student.
