= Kim Hwan-hee =

South Korean actress (born 2002)

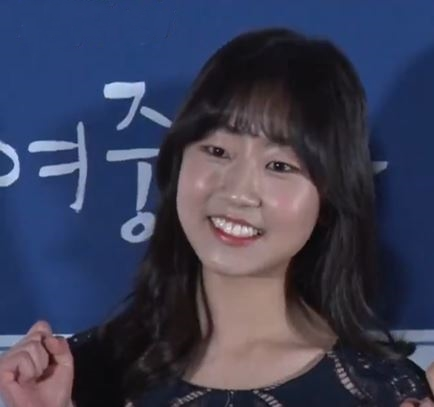
- Kim in 2018
- Born: August 25, 2002 (age 24); Seoul, South Korea
- Education: Hanyang University– Department of Theatre and Film
- Occupation: Actress
- Years active: 2008–present
- Agent: Namoo Actors

Korean name
- Hangul: 김환희
- Hanja: 金歡熙
- RR: Gim Hwanhui
- MR: Kim Hwanhŭi

Kim Hwan-hee (Korean: 김환희; born August 25, 2002) is a South Korean actress. She began her career as a child actress in 2008, and has been active ever since. She has starred in television dramas such as Invincible Lee Pyung Kang (2009), Believe in Love (2010), My One and Only (2010), and You Are the Best! (2013), as well as the films Born to Sing (2013) and The Wailing (2016).

== Filmography ==
=== Film ===
Year	Title	Role	Ref.
2011	Night Fishing	Min-yeong	
2011	Miracle (Bicycle Looking for a Whale)		
2013	Born to Sing	Moon Bo-ri	
2016	The Wailing	Hyo-jin	
2018	Middle School Girl A	Jang Mi-rae	
2022	Good Morning	Soo-Mi	

=== Television series ===
Year	Title	Role	Network	Ref.
2008	Robber	Jang Yoo-jin	SBS	
2008	Don't Cry My Love	Im Yoon-ji	MBC	
2009	Invincible Lee Pyung Kang	Lee Pyung-ohn	KBS2	
2010	Sunday Drama Theater: "Jo Eun-ji's Family"	Jo Eun-ji	MBC	
2011	Believe in Love	Kim Ran-yi	KBS2	
2011	KBS Drama Special: "Our Happy Days of Youth"	Dal-rae	KBS2	
2011	My One and Only	Yoon Yi-rang	KBS1	
2011	HDTV Literature: "My Mother and Her Guest"	Ok-hee	KBS1	
2011	You're Here, You're Here, You're Really Here	Joo-ri	MBN	
2012	Reply 1997	young Sung Shi-won	tvN	
2012	Ohlala Couple	Lee Baek-ho's daughter	KBS2	
2013	You Are the Best!	Han Woo-joo	KBS2	
2013	Drama Special Series: "Puberty Medley"	Shin Young-bok's younger sister (cameo, episode 3)	KBS2	
2014	Angel Eyes	Bo-ram (Cameo)	SBS	
2015	Oh My Ghost	Yoon Chae-hee (Cameo, episode 8)	tvN	
2016	On the Way to the Airport	Park Hyo-eun	KBS2	
2017	Sweet Revenge	Jung Deok-hee	oksusu TV	
2018	The Miracle We Met	Song Ji-soo	KBS2	
2019	Beautiful World	Park Su-ho	JTBC	
2020	When the Weather Is Fine	Im Hwi	JTBC	
2021	Here's My Plan	Lee So-hyun	MBC	

== Ambassadorship ==
- Public Relations Ambassador of Seoul International Children's Film Festival (2022)

== Awards and nominations ==
Year	Awards	Category	Nominated work	Result	Ref.
2011	KBS Drama Awards	Best Young Actress	Believe in Love, My One and Only	Won	
2013	KBS Drama Awards	Best Young Actress	You Are the Best!	Nominated	
2016	37th Blue Dragon Film Awards	Best New Actress	The Wailing	Nominated	
2016	53rd Grand Bell Awards	Best New Actress	The Wailing	Won	
2016	Korea Youth Film Festival	Favorite Young Actress	The Wailing	Won	
2016	Korean Film Actor's Association Awards	Shining Star Awards: Best New Actress	The Wailing	Won	
2016	KBS Drama Awards	Best Young Actress	On the Way to the Airport	Nominated	
2017	53rd Baeksang Arts Awards	Best New Actress – Film	The Wailing	Nominated	
2017	Golden Cinema Film Festival	Best Young Actress	The Wailing	Won	
2018	KBS Drama Awards	Best Young Actress	The Miracle We Met	Won	
2021	MBC Drama Awards	Excellence Award, Actress in a Short Drama	Here's My Plan	Won	
