= Good Morning (2022 film) =

2022 South Korean film

- Promotional poster
- Hangul: 안녕하세요
- Lit.: Hello
- RR: Annyeonghaseyo
- MR: Annyŏnghaseyo
- Directed by: Cha Bong-ju
- Starring: Kim Hwan-hee; Yoo Sun; Lee Soon-jae
- Production companies: DND Pictures; Hello Co., Ltd
- Distributed by: D-Station
- Release date: May 25, 2022
- Running time: 118 minutes
- Country: South Korea
- Language: Korean

Good Morning (Korean: 안녕하세요; RR: Annyeonghaseyo; lit. 'Hello') is a 2022 South Korean film directed by Cha Bong-ju in his feature directorial debut, starring Kim Hwan-hee, Yoo Sun, and Lee Soon-jae. It is a human drama film set in the backdrop of a hospice department where different people have different stories and depicts what happens when a girl who awaits her death comes in. It was released on May 25, 2022.

== Synopsis ==
19-year-old Su-mi, who is left alone in the world and has nowhere to depend, is waiting for death. Following the suggestion of the head nurse Seo-jin, Su-mi visits the Neulbom hospice where an unexpected pleasure and warmth greets her and she begins to learn the warmth of the world.

== Cast ==
- Kim Hwan-hee as Su-mi, a girl who was abandoned as soon as she was born.
- Yoo Sun as Seo-jin, a single mother who misses her daughter whom she lost 5 years ago.
- Lee Soon-jae as In-su, an elderly man studying Hangul to convey his heart even though he is about to die.
- Song Jae-rim as Barista Yoon, a man who makes people in the ward laugh with his humor.
- Park Hyun-sook as Seon-ah, a man dreams of a trip that might be the last with his son.
- Lee Yoon-ji as Jin-ah, a woman who came into the hospice ward with a sad story.
- Oh Dong-min as Eun-seok, Jin-ah's husband who quietly protects her.
- Kim Si-eun as Hee-sun, Seo Jin's daughter

== Production ==
Principal photography began on April 11, 2021.

== Release ==
The film was released in South Korea on May 25 on 229 screens and it was released on May 27 in Vietnam. It was also sold in Taiwan and was also released there.
