= Born to Sing (2013 film) =

- Hangul: 전국노래자랑
- RR: Jeonguk noraejarang
- MR: Chŏn'guk noraejarang
- Directed by: Lee Jong-pil
- Written by: Lee Jong-pil; Lee Kyung-kyu; Jung Mi-na
- Produced by: Lee Kyung-kyu
- Starring: Kim In-kwon; Ryu Hyun-kyung; Lee Cho-hee; Yoo Yeon-seok; Kim Soo-mi
- Cinematography: Kim Jong-seon
- Edited by: Kim Sang-bum; Kim Jae-bum
- Music by: Jeong Jung-han
- Distributed by: Lotte Entertainment
- Release date: May 2, 2013
- Running time: 112 minutes
- Country: South Korea
- Language: Korean
- Budget: ₩3 billion

Born to Sing (Korean: 전국노래자랑; lit. 'National Singing Contest') is a 2013 South Korean comedy-drama film starring Kim In-kwon and directed by Lee Jong-pil. Produced by comedian and variety show host Lee Kyung-kyu, it was released in theaters on May 2, 2013.

The film is based on National Singing Contest, an actual TV show that is the longest-running Sunday TV program in South Korea since its premiere in 1980. The show travels nationwide with its host/emcee Song Hae, and currently broadcasts on Sundays at 12:10 p.m. on KBS1 (its English title is Korea Sings). The touching and moving anecdotes shared by previous contestants led to the film Born to Sing, which tells the dynamic and intertwining stories of people seeking redemption at a singing contest.

== Plot ==
The TV program National Singing Contest is set to film in the city of Gimhae, South Gyeongsang Province. Because the contest is well known as a ticket to becoming a star singer, a number of locals scramble to appear in the televised show.

Among the applicants is Bong-nam (Kim In-kwon), a financially inept, socially awkward man who works as an assistant at his wife's hair salon during the day and as a personal driver for intoxicated businessmen at night. But Bong-nam's lifelong dream has always been to sing. When he hears the news that the country's most popular singing contest will be held in his hometown, he takes part in the preliminary auditions without telling his wife Mi-ae (Ryu Hyun-kyung). But soon, his stunning performance makes him the talk of the town, and he becomes an overnight star among the middle-aged women in the city.

Hyun-ja (Lee Cho-hee) is Mi-ae's younger sister. She works for a local health drink company, and has a crush on Dong-soo, a guy in the PR department (Yoo Yeon-seok). The company CEO orders Hyun-ja to enter the singing contest in order to promote their drink, which she does with Dong-soo's help.

Mayor Joo Ha-na (Kim Soo-mi) is running for reelection and thinks an appearance in the contest will boost her bid. Unfortunately, she is tone-deaf and a terrible singer. Maeng (Oh Kwang-rok), the section chief at city hall, is in charge of helping the production while they film in Gimhae, and he gets pressured by the mayor to find a way of getting her in.

Bo-ri (Kim Hwan-hee) lives with her grandfather (Oh Hyun-gyung). She helps him prepare for his audition, though he keeps forgetting the lyrics. But Bo-ri's mother arrives and wants to immigrate to Canada. So her grandfather is determined to join the contest to leave a lasting memory for his granddaughter.

== Cast ==
- Kim In-kwon as Bong-nam
- Ryu Hyun-kyung as Mi-ae
- Lee Cho-hee as Hyun-ja
- Yoo Yeon-seok as Dong-soo
- Kim Soo-mi as Mayor Joo Ha-na
- Oh Hyun-gyung as Grandfather Oh
- Kim Hwan-hee as Moon Bo-ri
- Shin Eun-kyung as Bo-ri's mother
- Oh Kwang-rok as Section chief Maeng
- Kim Yong-gun as CEO Hong
- Song Hae as himself
- Kim Tae-won as himself
- Yoo Yeon as Accidental sister
- Jung Suk-yong as health store owner
- Jung Kyung-soon as Mi-ae's mother
- Lee Se-rang as hair salon customer
- Kim Kyung-ae as elderly woman Hong
- Seo Young-ju as screenwriter Jung
- Seo Dong-soo as producer Shin
- Kim Joong-ki as Chinese restaurant owner Jong-bae
- Lee Kyung-kyu as man in ending scene music video (cameo)

== Awards and nominations ==
2014 50th Baeksang Arts Awards

- Nomination - Best New Director: Lee Jong-pil

2014 34th Golden Cinema Festival

- Best New Cinematographer: Kim Jong-seon
