= Phantom Lawyer =

2026 South Korean television series

- Promotional poster
- Also known as: With God
- Hangul: 신이랑 법률사무소
- Lit.: Shin Yi-rang Law Office
- RR: Sin Irang beomnyul samuso
- MR: Sin Irang pŏmnyul samuso
- Genre: Legal drama; Fantasy
- Written by: Kim Ga-young; Kang Cheol-gyu
- Directed by: Shin Joong-hoon
- Starring: Yoo Yeon-seok; Esom; Kim Kyung-nam
- Music by: Dalpalan
- Country of origin: South Korea
- Original language: Korean
- No. of episodes: 16

Production
- Running time: 70 minutes
- Production companies: Studio S; Mongjakso

Original release
- Network: SBS TV
- Release: March 13 – May 2, 2026

Phantom Lawyer (Korean: 신이랑 법률사무소) is a 2026 South Korean legal fantasy television series co-written by Kim Ga-young and Kang Cheol-gyu, directed by Shin Joong-hoon, and starring Yoo Yeon-seok and Esom. The series revolves around Shin Yi-rang, a lawyer who can see and be possessed by spirits, whose job is to resolve outstanding grievances of both the dead and the living. It aired on SBS TV from March 13, to May 2, 2026, every Friday and Saturday at 21:50 (KST). It is also available for streaming on Netflix, Viki, and Viu.

== Synopsis ==
Shin Yi-rang struggled to get a job with the law firms after passing bar exams because his father died as a disgraced prosecutor. He eventually opens his own practice in room 501 of the Okcheon Building, a space used by a shaman, and starts seeing ghosts. Yi-rang's first client is Lee Kang-pung, an ex-gang member who died due to surgical negligence. The surgeon, Lee Jung-seok, was acquitted by lawyer Han Na-hyun, who had an unexpected change of heart during the trial. Yang Do-kyung, a lawyer at Taebaek, will do anything to impress his father, Chairman Yang Byung-il. He is even gone so far as to order the destruction of evidence – a hard disk with EMR data that could incriminate Jung-seok. Thanks to Na-hyun, Yi-rang won a pivotal trial for Lee Kang-pung's family. She then helped uncover the truth behind idol trainee Kim Su-a's death, bringing closure to the young girl's grieving family.

== Cast and characters ==
=== Main ===
- Yoo Yeon-seok as Shin Yi-rang
  - Jo Sung-ha as young Yi-rang

Dreaming of creating the best law firm in Korea, he opens a firm in Room 501 of the Okcheon Building, a former shaman's place, where his life changes. As he meets ghosts and hears their stories, Yi-rang starts resolving their unresolved issues, helping them move on. Despite his timid and clumsy disposition, he exhibits steadfast determination in confronting the injustices experienced by his unconventional clients. When possessed, he temporarily embodies the spirits he represents, adopting their traits and behaviors.

- Esom as Han Na-hyun
  - Hwang Hyun-jung as Na-hyun

Taebaek Law Firm's Ace Lawyer. Her life is torn apart after an accident kills her sister So-hyun, leaving her with crushing guilt. Discovering So-hyun's diary, she learns of her sister's dream to become a lawyer. Driven by guilt, she fulfills her sister's dream, rising to ace at a major firm. She becomes a top lawyer, undefeated until a loss brings her face-to-face with Shin Yi-rang.

- Kim Kyung-nam as Yang Do-kyung

The CEO of Taebaek Law Firm who did everything he could, regardless of whether it was right or wrong, to win the case to be accepted by his father. He has complex feelings towards Na-hyun.

=== Supporting ===
Yi-rang's family

- Kim Mi-kyung as Park Gyeong-hwa
  - Kim Kang-hee as young Gyeong-hwa

Yi-rang's mother who runs a butcher shop to support her two children after her husband died and was accused of corruption, but she never believed he would do such a thing.

- Son Yeo-eun as Shin Sa-rang
  - Moon Seo-yeon as young Sa-rang

Yi-rang's older sister.

- Jeon Seok-ho as Yoon Bong-su

Yi-rang's brother-in-law.

- Lee A-rin as Yoon Da-bong

Yi-rang's niece, who is Bong-su and Sa-rang's daughter.

Na-hyun's family

- Hwang Bo-reum-byeol as Han So-hyun

Na-hyun's elder sister, who died in an accident while trying to protect her.

- Lee Dae-yeon as Na-hyun's dad
- Yoon Bok-in as Na-hyun's mother

Taebaek Law Firm

- Choi Kwang-Il as Yang Byung-Il

Taebaek's chairman and Do-kyung's father, who was the Ki-joong's senior. He was the one behind his death.

- Sang Do-hyun as Choi Min-hyuk

Yi-rang's client

- Heo Sung-tae as Lee Kang-pung

A former gangster who died at the age of 46. He is Yi-rang's first ghost client. (Ep.1–2)

- Oh Ye-ju as Kim Su-ah

A talented but tragic trainee who died before her debut. (Ep.3–4)

- Yoon Na-moo as Jeon Sang-ho

A genius scientist ghost (Ep.5–6)

- Lee Deok-hwa as Kang Dong-sik (Ep.10–11)
  - Kang Joon-kyu as young Dong-sik

A shoemaker who founded a large shoe company with his wife, Chae Jung-hee, whom he met in 1979. Before his death, he suffered from severe dementia, so his spirit doesn't remember his wife, but his skill and obsession with shoes remain intact.

- Park Da-on as Yoon Si-ho (Ep.12–13)

A boy who was kidnapped and murdered by a police officer.

Others

- Jeong Seung-gil as Matthew

a former shaman who becomes a priest.He helped Yi-rang release the spirit after completing their unfinished task.

- Yeon Ji-hyung as Kim Hyun-woo, a prosecutor and Na-hyun's close friend

=== Special appearances ===
- Choi Won-young as Shin Ki-joong

Yi-rang's deceased father, a former prosecutor whose career ended after he was accused of corruption.

== Production ==
=== Development ===
The Phantom Lawyer is directed by Shin Joong-hoon, who helmed Seoul Busters (2024), and the screenplay is co-written by Kim Ga-young and Kang Cheol-gyu. Produced by Studio S and Mongjakso, It blends legal drama with fantasy, delving into grief, truth, and the need to be heard. It portrays a lawyer who goes beyond legal defense to provide emotional support, bringing closure to the dead and helping the living move on.

=== Casting ===
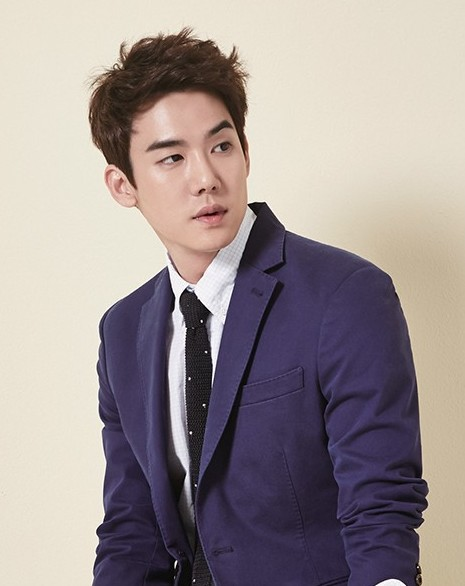
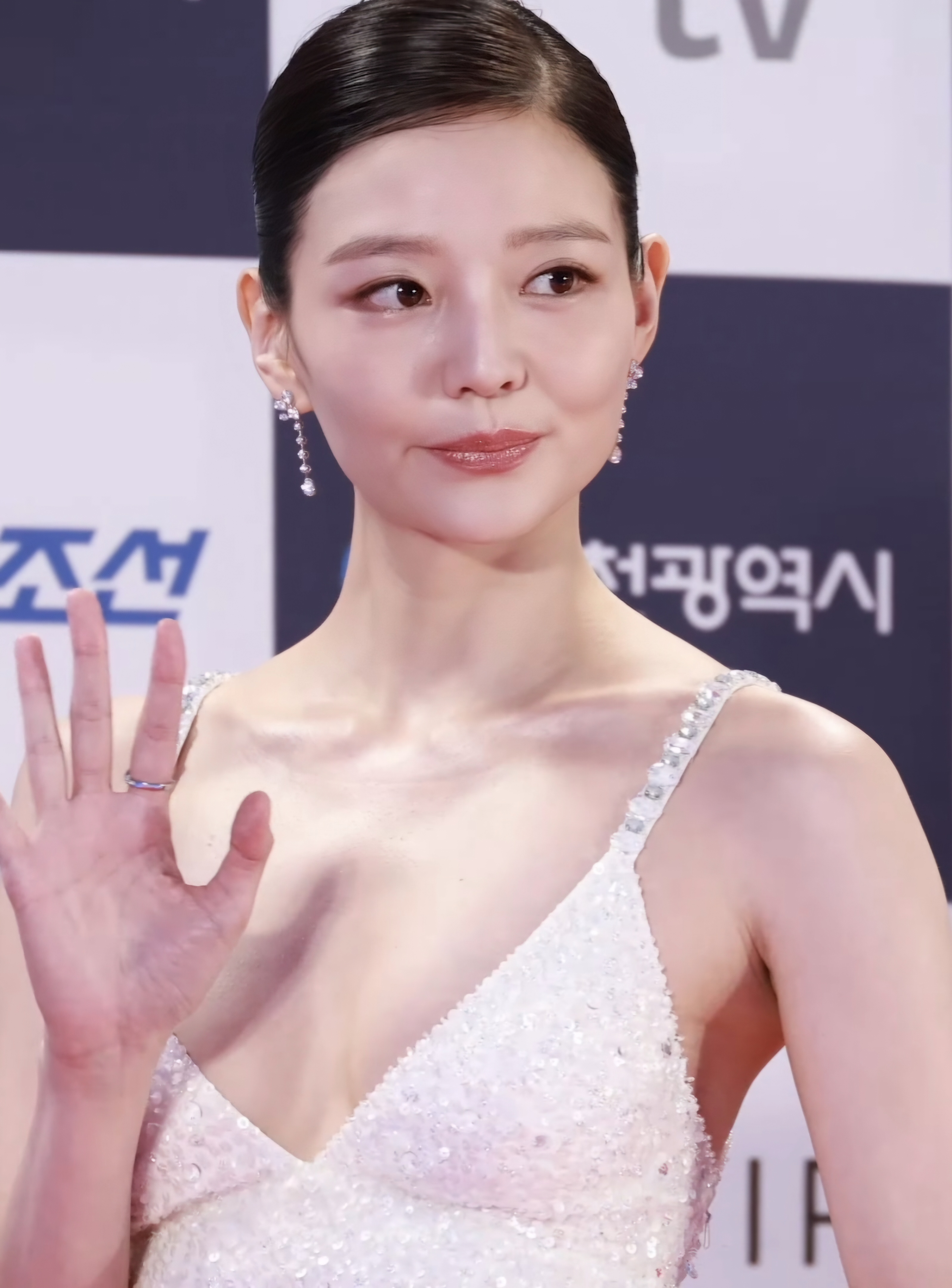
Yoo Yeon-seok (L) and Esom (R)

The casting process began in late 2024, with media outlets reporting that Yoo Yeon-seok and Esom were cast for the lead roles, respectively. Yoo stated that the project might be a human comedy, and that through possession he could portray various characters with great variety, blending comedic moments with cool-headedness in the courtroom.

Yoo and Esom's appeareances were officially confirmed by late 2025, and Yeon Ji-hyung had been cast.

=== Filming ===
Principal photography began in early 2025.

== Release ==
Phantom Lawyer was originally scheduled to premiere on SBS TV in the second half of 2025, but then it was moved to the first half of 2026. In November 2025, it was reportedly scheduled to air in January 2026. On December 31, 2025, a special teaser video was released, and it was confirmed to premiere in March 2026.

By February 2026, the series was confirmed to be broadcast on March 13, 2026, and would air every Friday and Saturday at 21:50 (KST). It is also available for streaming on Netflix, Viki, and Viu internationally.

== Viewership ==
Phantom Lawyer : South Korea viewers per episode (millions)

Season	Episode number																Average
Season	1	2	3	4	5	6	7	8	9	10	11	12	13	14	15	16	Average
1	1.165	1.680	1.506	1.820	1.606	1.955	1.490	1.724	1.276	1.246	1.248	1.178	1.231	1.172	1.366	1.507	1.448

Source: Audience measurement performed nationwide by Nielsen Korea.

Average TV viewership ratings
Ep.	Original broadcast date	Average audience share (Nielsen Korea)	
Ep.	Original broadcast date	Nationwide	Seoul
1	March 13, 2026	6.3% (6th)	5.6% (5th)
2	March 14, 2026	8.7% (2nd)	9.2% (2nd)
3	March 20, 2026	7.8% (3rd)	8.1% (2nd)
4	March 21, 2026	9.1% (2nd)	9.3% (2nd)
5	March 27, 2026	8.7% (2nd)	9.0% (1st)
6	March 28, 2026	10.0% (2nd)	10.6% (2nd)
7	April 3, 2026	7.6% (3rd)	7.3% (1st)
8	April 4, 2026	9.5% (2nd)	9.4% (2nd)
9	April 10, 2026	6.7% (5th)	6.5% (4th)
10	April 11, 2026	6.6% (4th)	6.7% (3rd)
11	April 17, 2026	6.5% (5th)	6.4% (2nd)
12	April 18, 2026	6.0% (5th)	6.3% (4th)
13	April 24, 2026	6.5% (5th)	5.9% (3rd)
14	April 25, 2026	6.0% (3rd)	6.0% (3rd)
15	May 1, 2026	7.3% (3rd)	7.3% (2nd)
16	May 2, 2026	7.6% (3rd)	7.6% (3rd)
Average		7.6%	7.6%
In the table above, the blue numbers represent the lowest ratings and the red numbers represent the highest ratings.
