= Insane (film) =

- Poster
- Hangul: 날, 보러와요
- RR: Nal, boreowayo
- MR: Nal, porŏwayo
- Directed by: Lee Cheol-ha
- Written by: Lee Cheol-ha
- Produced by: Kim Yo-hwan; Kim Yoon-mi
- Starring: Kang Ye-won; Lee Sang-yoon; Choi Jin-ho; Ji Dae-han; Chun Min-hee
- Cinematography: Kim Min
- Edited by: Kim Woo-hyun; Steve M. Choe
- Music by: Kim Ji-ae; Kim Seung-lim
- Production companies: OAL; Valentine Films; A&G Modes
- Distributed by: Megabox Plus M
- Release date: April 7, 2016
- Running time: 91 minutes
- Country: South Korea
- Language: Korean
- Box office: US$7.6 million

Insane (Korean: 날, 보러와요; RR: Nal, boreowayo, "Come to See Me") is a 2016 South Korean mystery thriller film directed by Lee Cheol-ha. It was released in South Korea on April 7, 2016.

== Plot ==
During the day and in the middle of taking a walk downtown, Kang Soo-Ah (Kang Ye-won) is taken away against her will and brought to a psychiatric hospital headed by the sadistic director Jang Hyung-sik, where she is locked up. The people working there refuse to answer her questions about why she was taken away, and she is given "medication" drugs. If she refuses to take them or fight back, she finds that they will physically harm her in response. While pretending to be okay with everything terrible that is done to her, Soo-Ah begins to secretly write down in detail all of the horrific acts that take place at the psychiatric hospital in a journal she finds. After a botched escape, she is subjected to horrific torture as a punishment. One of the orderlies, Dong-sik fed up with inhumane treatments of the facility and contacts Soo-Ah's boyfriend, Lee Woo-Jin to mount of a rescue. However, the rescue failed as the three of them are captured with Woo-jin being subjected to disembowelment. At the same time, Mi-ro, one of the patients and Hyung-sik's sex slave, accidentally sets Hyung-sik's office on fire. Jang Hyung-sik runs to the office to recover the safe contains his illegal money. Mi-ro helps the trio escape but Dong-sik stays behind to rescue the rest of the captives. As Soo-Ah and Woo-jin escape, a heavily burned Jang Hyung-sik attacks and drags Woo-jin away, causing both of them to be burned to death. Soo-Ah escapes the facility and goes to her house and finds her abusive stepfather died with a gunshot wound. She is then arrested later on under the suspicious of murder and arson of the psychiatric hospital

One year later, Na Nam-Soo (Lee Sang-yoon) is working as a programming director for the same broadcasting station he was suspended from in the previous year for exposing the corruptions of a national assembly member. He is assigned to a project to discover what really happened to the psychiatric hospital, which recently burned down in a fire. He finds the notebook belonging to Soo-Ah but cannot find anything about the fire; to uncover the truth, Nam-Soo seeks out Soo-Ah, who is now in prison as a murder suspect but she is uncooperative. As Nam-soo goes to the burned down hospital to film his document with his crew, he stumped upon a heavily burned Dong-sik. In the hospital, Nam-soo questions Dong-sik what he knows about Soo-ah's diary and this agitated Dong-sik. Digging deeper into the case, Nam-soo discovers that the psychiatric hospital was founded by none other than police commissioner Kang Byung-joo, Soo-ah's stepfather and Jang Hyung-sik was his protege. Nam-soo eventually discovers that the psychiatric hospital is actually a front of a organ trafficking ring and human disappearance scheme where unscrupulous individuals can pay the place to make their enemies or undesirables disappear. The psychiatric hospital exploits a loophole in Korean laws that any person can be sent to psychiatric hospital without clear diagnoses if there are consents of two of three family members. Nam-soo deducts that Kang Byung-joo tricked Soo-ah's mother into surrendering her assets and imprisoned Soo-ah to tie off loose ends.

Unable to get Soo-ah to confess her connections to Byung-joo due to her emotional distress and Dong-sik seemingly escapes from the hospital, Nam-soo exposes the truth of the corruption of the psychiatric hospital to gain views and public supports as well as to provoke Soo-ah to come forward. After massive public outrage, Soo-ah comes forward and confesses her ordeals and her connection with Kang Byung-joo. Furthermore, Nam-soo also reveals the incriminating documents Byung-joo made to trick Soo-ah's mother into surrendering her assets. For his demise, Nam-soo theorizes that Byung-joo committed suicide after the destruction of his hospital to avoid life sentence. Eventually, Soo-ah is vindicated in the court.

When Nam-soo drives Soo-ah back home, Soo-ah then reveals to Nam-soo the truth: that she was not the one that was put in the psychiatric hospital at all, but it was actually her late mother. The diary in Nam-soo's hand actually belongs to Dong-sik and the one with Dong-sik to the rescue in the hospital was actually Soo-ah, as it turned out her boyfriend Woo-jin was actually Soo-ah's late father. The one that Hyung-sik killed that day was Soo-ah's mother. Finally, it is revealed that Soo-ah was the one that killed Byung-joo out of revenge. Out of sympathy, Nam-soo decides to bury the secrets so Soo-ah can have a normal life.

== Cast ==
- Kang Ye-won as Kang Soo-ah
- Lee Sang-yoon as Na Nam-soo
- Choi Jin-ho as Jang Hyung-sik
- Ji Dae-han as Kang Byung-joo
- Chun Min-hee as Mi-ro
- Lee Hak-joo as Dong-sik
- Choi Yoon-so as Ji-young
- Jo Jae-yoon as Detective Park
- Gu Won as Woo-sub
- Kim Jong-soo as Detective Cha
- Jang Tae-seong as Department Head Koo
- Yoo Gun as Lee Woo-jin
- Jeon Kwang-jin as death angel
- Kim Ho-won as emergency room doctor
- Ahn Ji-hye as Yeo-kyung
- Park Se-jin as prison doctor
- Kim Hyun as patient's family member
- Gil Hae-yeon as Kang Soo-ah's mother

== Reception ==
The film was number-one on its opening weekend in South Korea with US$2.3 million. On its second weekend it was second placed behind Time Renegades with US$1.43 million.

== Awards and nominations ==
Year	Award	Category	Recipient	Result
2016	37th Blue Dragon Film Awards	Best New Actor	Lee Sang-yoon	Nominated
2016	53rd Grand Bell Awards	Best Actress	Kang Ye-won	Nominated
2016	53rd Grand Bell Awards	Best New Actor	Lee Sang-yoon	Nominated
