= Yoo Yeon-seok =

South Korean actor (born 1984)

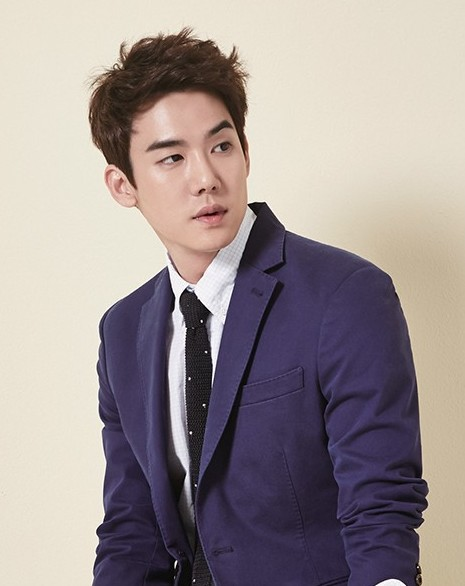
- Yoo in March 2015
- Born: April 11, 1984 (age 42); Seoul, South Korea
- Education: Sejong University
- Occupation: Actor
- Years active: 2003–present
- Agent: King Kong by Starship

Korean name
- Hangul: 안연석
- RR: An Yeonseok
- MR: An Yŏnsŏk

Stage name
- Hangul: 유연석
- RR: Yu Yeonseok
- MR: Yu Yŏnsŏk

Ahn Yeon-seok (Korean: 안연석; born April 11, 1984), better known by the stage name Yoo Yeon-seok, is a South Korean actor. After making his acting debut in 2003 with a small role in Oldboy, he resumed his acting career in 2008. His notable works include the films Re-encounter (2011), Architecture 101 (2012), A Werewolf Boy (2012), Whistle Blower (2014), and Love, Lies (2016), as well as the television series Reply 1994 (2013), Dr. Romantic (2016), Mr. Sunshine (2018), Hospital Playlist (2020–2021), When the Phone Rings (2024), Phantom Lawyer (2026), and The Perfect Lie (2026).

== Early life ==
Yoo was born as Ahn Yeon-seok on April 11, 1984, in Seoul, South Korea as a son of professor of engineering. In his junior year in high school, Yoo decided to take up acting and followed his older brother, who was preparing for the college entrance exams, to Seoul and they lived together near the district of Samseong-dong.

While taking acting classes, Yoo landed his first role by chance after meeting a friend who would later work on the costume staff of film director Park Chan-wook for the film Oldboy. He auditioned for a role on the recommendation of the friend and was immediately cast as the younger version of Yoo Ji-tae's character due to their resemblance.

After appearing in Oldboy, Yoo enlisted in the Republic of Korea Air Force for mandatory military service and began undergraduate studies at Sejong University. Upon graduation from Sejong University with a degree in Film Arts, he resumed his acting career in 2008, appearing in the plays In The Burning Darkness and Understudy. He also began using his agency's recommended stage name, Yoo Yeon-seok.

== Career ==
=== 2008–2012: Career beginnings ===
After an extended hiatus from acting, Yoo made his return in the medical drama General Hospital 2.

Yoo took on supporting roles on television, such as the haughty student body president in the horror series Soul and more appealing characters in medical drama Midnight Hospital and Tasty Life. But Yoo received his best reviews yet for playing a sensitive ex-boyfriend searching for his child in the independent film Re-encounter.

Soon after, Yoo became known to mainstream audiences as the rich and spoiled antagonist in the box office hit melodramas Architecture 101, and A Werewolf Boy. He further raised his profile with comedy film Born to Sing, and the fantasy series Gu Family Book.

=== 2013–2014: Rising popularity and breakthrough ===
Yoo rose to popularity in the nostalgic campus drama Reply 1994 in late 2013. Following his breakout year, he was cast in two high-profile films in 2014: Whistle Blower about infamous biotech researcher Hwang Woo-suk, and Joseon-set period drama The Royal Tailor. Yoo then appeared in the travel-reality show Youth Over Flowers.

=== 2015–present: Leading roles ===
In 2015, Yoo was cast in his first leading role on network television as a chef and restaurateur in the romantic comedy series Warm and Cozy, written by the Hong sisters and set on Jeju Island. He also starred in the thriller Perfect Proposal (a remake of Woman of Straw), and The Beauty Inside (adapted from the social film of the same title). Later in the year, Yoo played the protagonist in Le Passe-Muraille ("The Man Who Walked Through Wall"); this was his first stage musical since his professional acting debut (Yoo had previously appeared in theatrical productions while still in university).

In 2016, Yoo starred in the period music drama Love, Lies followed by romantic comedy Mood of the Day. He returned to the small screen with hit medical drama Dr. Romantic alongside Han Suk-kyu and Seo Hyun-jin.

In 2018, Yoo starred in romance melodrama Mr. Sunshine penned by Kim Eun-sook. He then appeared in the musical A Gentleman's Guide to Love and Murder.

In 2020, Yoo starred in the critically acclaimed and hit medical drama Hospital Playlist, playing Ahn Jeong-won, an assistant professor of pediatric surgery and reprised his role in season 2 in 2021.

In 2022, Yoo starred in the crime-mystery film Vanishing by French film director Denis Dercourt, as detective Park Jin-ho. In December, he starred in the JTBC series The Interest of Love, playing an employee at a bank.

In 2023, he also reprised his role as Kang Dong-joo in a cameo role in the third season of Dr. Romantic.

== Filmography ==
=== Film ===
Year	Title	Role	Notes	Ref.
2003	Oldboy	Young Lee Woo-jin	Credit as Ahn Yeon-suk	
2009	Short! Short! Short! 2009: Show Me the Money	Man	Segment: "Saw"	
2011	Re-encounter	Han-soo		
2012	Eighteen, Nineteen	Ho-ya		
2012	Architecture 101	Jae-wook		
2012	Two Weddings and a Funeral	Joon	Cameo	
2012	Horror Stories	Man	Segment: "Beginning"	
2012	A Werewolf Boy	Ji-tae		
2013	Born to Sing	Dong-soo		
2013	Hwayi: A Monster Boy	Park Ji-won		
2014	Whistle Blower	Shim Min-ho		
2014	The Royal Tailor	King Yeonjo		
2015	Perfect Proposal	Sung-yeol		
2015	The Beauty Inside	Woo-jin		
2016	Love, Lies	Kim Yoon-woo		
2016	Mood of the Day	Jae-hyun		
2016	A Quiet Dream	Motorcycle man	Cameo	
2020	Steel Rain 2: Summit	Jo Seon-sa (North Korean Leader)		
2021	New Year Blues	Jae-Hyun		
2022	Vanishing	Park Jin-ho	Korean-French Film	
2023	My Heart Puppy	Min-soo		
2025	No Other Choice	Oh Jin-ho	Cameo	
2026	The Assassin(s)	Maeda	Cameo	

=== Television series ===
Year	Title	Role	Notes	Ref.
2008–2009	General Hospital 2	Heo Woo-jin		
2009	Dream	Noh Chul-joong		
2009	Soul	Baek Joong-chan		
2010	Running, Gu	Heo Ji-man		
2010–2011	Pure Pumpkin Flower	Oh Hyo-joon		
2011	Midnight Hospital	Yoon Sang-ho		
2012	Tasty Life	Choi Jae-hyuk		
2012	What About Mom?	Kim Yeon-seok		
2013	Gu Family Book	Park Tae-seo		
2013	Reply 1994	Chilbong		
2015	Warm and Cozy	Baek Gun-woo		
2015	Mrs. Cop	Jo Young-woo	Cameo (episode 16)	
2016–2023	Dr. Romantic	Kang Dong-joo	Season 1 and 3 (Special appearance; episode 12–16)	
2018	Mr. Sunshine	Goo Dong-mae		
2020–2021	Hospital Playlist	Ahn Jeong-won / Andrea	Season 1–2	
2022	Narco-Saints	David Park		
2022–2023	The Interest of Love	Ha Sang-soo		
2023	A Bloody Lucky Day	Lee Byeong-Min / Geum Hyuk-soo		
2024–2025	When the Phone Rings	Paik Sa-eon		
2025	Resident Playbook	Ahn Jeong-won / Andrea	Special appearance (episode 5)	
2025	Tastefully Yours	Jeon-min	Special appearance (episode 5–7)	
2026	Phantom Lawyer	Shin Yi-rang		
2026	The Perfect Lie	Min Jun-ho		
TBA	Covet the Scholar, Princess	Kim Seo-yul		
TBA	My Troika	Min Sa-jun		

=== Television shows ===
Year	Title	Role	Notes	Ref.
2012	Cats and Dogs	Host		
2014	Youth Over Flowers	Regular cast	with Son Ho-Jun & Baro (Reply 1994 cast members)	
2016	Wekid	Mentor		
2019	Coffee Friends	Regular cast	with Son Ho-jun Choi Ji-woo and Yang Se-jong	
2021	Wise Mountain Village Life	Cast Member	with Hospital Playlist casts (Jo Jung Suk, Jeon Mido, Jung Kyung Ho & Kim Dae Myung)	
2024	Whenever Possible	Host	with Yoo Jae-suk	

=== Web shows ===
Year	Title	Role	Notes	Ref.
2023	Bro and Marble	Cast Member	with Lee Seung-gi, Lee Dong-hwi, Ji Seok-jin, Kyuhyun, Joshua and Hoshi	

=== Hosting ===
Year	Title	Notes	Ref.
2018	39th Blue Dragon Film Awards	with Kim Hye-soo	
2019	40th Blue Dragon Film Awards	with Kim Hye-soo	
2021	41st Blue Dragon Film Awards	with Kim Hye-soo	
2021	42nd Blue Dragon Film Awards	with Kim Hye-soo	
2022	43rd Blue Dragon Film Awards	with Kim Hye-soo	
2023	44th Blue Dragon Film Awards	with Kim Hye-soo	

=== Music video appearances ===
Year	Title	Artist	Ref.
2008	"Things to Do Tomorrow"	Yoon Jong-shin	
2009	"On the Days I Longed for Love"	Lee Oh Gong Gam	
2013	"You Fool"	Honey-G	
2013	"Things to Do Tomorrow"	Yoon Jong-shin feat. Sung Si-kyung	
2013	"The Day to Love"	Lee Seung-chul	
2013	"One Way Love"	Hyolyn	
2013	"Only Feeling You"	Yoo Yeon-seok, Son Ho-jun and Jung Woo	
2014	"Three People"	Toy feat. Sung Si-kyung	
2015	"Because You're Pretty"	Standing Egg	
2018	"Then You"	K.Will	
2020	"Daystar"	Kyuhyun	

== Discography ==
=== Singles ===
List of singles, showing year released, selected chart positions, and name of the album
Title	Year	Peak chart positions		Album
Title	Year	KOR Gaon	US World	Album
"Only Feeling You" (너만을 느끼며) (with Jung Woo and Son Ho-jun)	2013	8	—	Reply 1994 OST Part 7
"To You" (너에게)	2021	73	—	Hospital Playlist Season 2 OST Part 7
"Our Vacation" (with Bro & Marble Cast)	2023	—	—	Bro & Marble OST
"Happy Together" (with Cho Kyu-hyun)	2023	—	—	Bro & Marble OST
"Falling"	2023	—	—	Non-album single
"Say My Name"	2024	—	7	When the Phone Rings OST

== Stage ==
=== Musical ===
Musical play performances
Year	Title	Role	Ref.
2015–2016	Le Passe-Muraille (벽을 뚫는 남자)	Dusoleil	
2017	Hedwig and the Angry Inch (헤드윅)	Hedwig	
2019	A Gentleman's Guide to Love and Murder (젠틀맨스 가이드)	Monty Navarro	
2020	Werther (베르테르)	Werther	
2021–2022	A Gentleman's Guide to Love and Murder (젠틀맨스 가이드)	Monty Navarro	
2024	Hedwig and the Angry Inch (헤드윅)	Hedwig	

=== Theater ===
Theater play performances
Year	Title	Role	Ref.
2008	The Good Person of Szechwan (사천사는 착한사람)		
2008	In The Burning Darkness (타오르는 어둠속에서)		
2009	The Understudy (언더스터디)		
2017	Death of a Salesman - Suwon (세일즈맨의 죽음 - 수원)	Howard	

== Other activities ==
In March 2026, Yoo has been appointed as a professor at Sejong University, his alma mater, to teach the Multimedia Performance course to senior students in the acting arts major at the Department of Film Art.

== Personal life ==
=== Tax dispute ===
In March 2025, South Korean media reported that the National Tax Service had audited Forever Entertainment, a company founded by Yoo, of which he is chief executive, and notified him of additional taxes of about ₩7 billion, including income tax, then described as the largest publicly reported assessment of a South Korean celebrity. King Kong by Starship said the assessment arose from differences in how Yoo's tax representative and the tax authorities interpreted and applied tax law, that it had not been finalized, and that the agency would address the dispute through legal procedures.

Yoo requested a pre-assessment review. After adjustments, including for amounts already paid as corporate tax, the figure reported as due was about ₩3 billion, which he paid. In August 2026, the Tax Tribunal dismissed his appeal. His agency said the matter still stemmed from differences in the interpretation and application of tax law and that related procedures had not fully concluded; an administrative lawsuit remained possible.

== Bibliography ==
Year	Title	Publisher	ISBN
2014	Yoo Yeon-seok's Dream	Paperbook	ISBN 9788997148387

== Ambassadorship ==
- Ambassador for the 5th Seoul Animal Film Festival (2022)

== Accolades ==
=== Awards and nominations ===
Name of the award ceremony, year presented, category, nominee of the award, and the result of the nomination
Award ceremony	Year	Category	Nominee / Work	Result	Ref.
APAN Star Awards	2018	Excellence Award, Actor in a Miniseries	Mr. Sunshine	Nominated	
Asia Artist Awards	2018	Artist of the Year	Mr. Sunshine	Won	
Asia Artist Awards	2018	Best Actor	Mr. Sunshine	Won	
Asia Artist Awards	2018	Popularity Award (Actor)	Mr. Sunshine	Nominated	
Asia Artist Awards	2020	Popularity Award (Actor)	Yoo Yeon-seok	Nominated	
Baeksang Arts Awards	2015	Best Supporting Actor – Film	The Royal Tailor	Nominated	
Baeksang Arts Awards	2019	Best Supporting Actor – Television	Mr. Sunshine	Nominated	
Baeksang Arts Awards	2024	Best Actor – Television	A Bloody Lucky Day	Nominated	
Blue Dragon Film Awards	2012	Best New Actor	Horror Stories	Nominated	
Blue Dragon Film Awards	2021 (Note: Postponed to 2021 due to COVID-19)	Best Supporting Actor	Steel Rain 2: Summit	Nominated	
Golden Cinema Festival	2015	Best New Actor	The Royal Tailor	Won	
Grand Bell Awards	2011	Best New Actor	Re-encounter	Nominated	
Grand Bell Awards	2015	Best Supporting Actor	The Royal Tailor	Nominated	
Korea Film Actors Association Awards	2016	Popularity Award	Mood of the Day	Won	
Korea Musical Awards	2018	Best New Actor	Hedwig and the Angry Inch	Nominated	
MBC Drama Awards	2015	Top 10 Star Award	Warm and Cozy	Won	
MBC Drama Awards	2024	Best Couple Award	Yoo Yeon-seok (with Chae Soo-bin); When the Phone Rings	Won	
MBC Drama Awards	2024	Grand Prize (Daesang)	When the Phone Rings	Nominated	
MBC Drama Awards	2024	Top Excellence Award, Actor in a Miniseries	When the Phone Rings	Won	
SBS Drama Awards	2016	Excellence Award, Actor in a Genre Drama	Dr. Romantic	Won	
SBS Drama Awards	2016	Best Couple Award	Dr. Romantic (with Seo Hyun-jin)	Won	
SBS Drama Awards	2016	Idol Academy Award – Best Kiss	Dr. Romantic (with Seo Hyun-jin)	Won	
SBS Entertainment Awards	2024	Rookie Award (Talk/Reality)	Whenever Possible	Won	
SBS Entertainment Awards	2025	Excellence Award (Show/Variety)	Whenever Possible	Won	
SBS Entertainment Awards	2025	Best Couple	Yoo Yeon-seok (with Yoo Jae-suk); Whenever Possible	Won	
The Seoul Awards	2018	Best Supporting Actor (Drama)	Mr. Sunshine	Won	
Soompi Awards	2018	Best Supporting Actor Male Category	Mr. Sunshine	Nominated	
Style Icon Awards	2014	Top 10 Style Icon	Yoo Yeon-seok	Won	

=== Listicles ===
Name of publisher, year listed, name of listicle, and placement
Publisher	Year	Listicle	Placement	Ref.
Forbes	2019	Korea Power Celebrity 40	22nd	
Korean Film Council	2021	Korean Actors 200 (Note: Introduces 200 actors that best represent the present and future of Korean cinema to the people in the film industry all over the world.)	Included	
