= Cho Jung-rae =

South Korean film director (born 1973)

- Born: October 15, 1973 (age 53); South Korea
- Education: Chung-Ang University - Film Studies
- Occupation: Film director
- Years active: 2000–present

Korean name
- Hangul: 조정래
- RR: Jo Jeongrae
- MR: Cho Chŏngnae

Cho Jung-rae (Korean: 조정래; born October 15, 1973) is a South Korean film director. Cho has made three feature films: Duresori: The Voice of the East (2012), the documentary Foulball (also known as Wonders, 2015), and the 2016 film Spirits' Homecoming. He has also directed about 200 commercials, television documentaries, music videos and short films. But the theatrical release had to be delayed because the film had trouble finding a distributor.

== Filmography ==
- The Boil (short film, 2000) - director
- Duresori: The Voice of the East (2012) - director, executive producer, script editor, actor
- Where Are to Go? (2013) - actor
- Foulball a.k.a. Wonders (documentary, 2015) - director
- Spirits' Homecoming (2016) - director, screenwriter, producer
- Spirits' Homecoming, Unfinished Story (2017) - director
- A Long Way Around (2019) - producer
- Sorikkun (2020) - director

== Awards ==
- 2016 53rd Grand Bell Awards: Best New Director (Spirits' Homecoming)
