= Mood of the Day =

- Directed by: Jo Kyu-jang
- Written by: Min So-yeon; Jo Kyu-jang
- Produced by: Choi Jin
- Starring: Moon Chae-won; Yoo Yeon-seok
- Cinematography: Yu Eok
- Edited by: Kim Chang-ju
- Music by: Kim Tae-seong
- Distributed by: Showbox
- Release date: January 14, 2016
- Running time: 103 minutes
- Country: South Korea
- Language: Korean
- Box office: US$4.5 million

Mood of the Day (Korean: 그날의 분위기; RR: Geunarui bunwigi) is 2016 South Korean film starring Moon Chae-won and Yoo Yeon-seok.

== Plot ==
Kim Jae-hyun (Yoo Yeon-seok) is a sports manager and former talented basketball player. His only wish is to send a novice and promising player Kang Chul to America. To fulfill his wish, he must head to Busan to find and convince Kang Chul. Meanwhile, Bae Soo-jung (Moon Chae-won) works in an advertising agency and must also travel to Busan for a business trip. The two meet on the KTX train and spend 24 hours in the unfamiliar city of Busan, South Korea.

== Cast ==
- Moon Chae-won as Soo-jung
- Yoo Yeon-seok as Jae-hyun
- Jo Jae-yoon as Kang
- Kim Seul-gi
- Park Min-woo
- Lee Yeon-doo as Bo-kyung
- Kang Soo-jin
- Lee Un-jung
- Jo Woo-jin as Agency junior

== Reception ==
A review in HanCinema described the characters as 'sort of unpleasant' and was generally critical towards most aspects of the film.
