= Kim Si-eun (actress, born 2000) =

South Korean actress (born 2000)

- Born: October 29, 2000 (age 25); Gimpo, South Korea
- Education: Kaywon High School of Arts
- Occupation: Actress
- Years active: 2016–present
- Agent: Management Romantic

Korean name
- Hangul: 김시은
- RR: Gim Sieun
- MR: Kim Siŭn

Kim Si-eun (Korean: 김시은; born October 29, 2000) is a South Korean actress. She is known for her lead roles in Crushes Reverse, Miss Independent Ji Eun 2, and Monchouchou Globalhouse. She is also known for her role in the hit drama Love Alarm as Yook-jo.

== Filmography ==
=== Film ===
Year	Title	Role	Ref.
2022	Good Morning	Hee-sun	

=== Television ===
Year	Title	Role	Notes	Ref.
2016	Hello, My Twenties!	Young Jin-myung		
2017	School 2017	Lee Min-jung		
2018	When Time Stopped	Si-eun		
2018	Crushes Reverse	Yoo So-mi	Web series	
2018	Bad Papa	Choi Sun-joo		
2018	A-Teen	Park Ye-ji	Web series	
2018	Room No. 9	Kim Hye-sun		
2018	Folklore	Seo-woo's friend	Episode: "Mongdal"	
2019	Miss Independent Ji Eun 2	Lee Ji-eun	Web series	
2019	Mon ChouChou Global House	Moon So-ra		
2019–2021	Love Alarm	Yook-jo		
2020	Nobody Knows	Choi Soo-jung		
2020	Modern Girl	Young-yi	Drama special	
2020	Homemade Love Story	Cha Ba-reun		
2021	Voice	Kwon Saet Byeol	Season 4; episodes 8–9, 11–12	
2022	O'pening: "Stock of High School"	Kang Yoo-jung	one act-drama; season 5	
2022	Tomorrow	Ryu Cho-hui	Episode 14-16	
2022	Insider	Park Ro-sa		
2024	Dear Hyeri	Ju Hye-ri (Young)	Episode 5	
2024	Family Matters	Kwon Min-jeong		
2025	Would You Marry Me?	Cha Se-jeong		

== Ambassadorship ==
- Honorary Ambassador for the 2019 Asia-Pacific Forest Conference
