= Remember (2022 film) =

2022 South Korean film

- Promotional poster
- Hangul: 리멤버
- RR: Rimembeo
- MR: Rimembŏ
- Directed by: Lee Il-hyung
- Screenplay by: Lee Il-hyung; Yoon Jong-bin
- Based on: Remember by Benjamin August
- Produced by: Kuk Su-ran; Yoon Jong-bin
- Starring: Lee Sung-min; Nam Joo-hyuk
- Cinematography: Yu Eok
- Production company: Moonlight Films
- Distributed by: Ace Maker Movie Works
- Release date: October 26, 2022
- Running time: 128 minutes
- Country: South Korea
- Language: Korean
- Box office: US$3.1 million

Remember (Korean: 리멤버; RR: Rimembeo) is a 2022 South Korean action film directed by Lee Il-hyung, starring Lee Sung-min and Nam Joo-hyuk. The film is a remake of the 2015 Canadian film of the same name with the plot elements shifted to focus on Korea under Japanese occupation in World War II.

It was released theatrically on October 26, 2022.

== Synopsis ==
Remember tells the story of Pil-Joo (Lee Sung-min), an Alzheimer's patient in his 80s, who lost all his family during the Japanese colonial era, and devotes his lifelong revenge before his memories disappear, and a young man in his 20s (Nam Joo-hyuk) who helps him.

== Cast ==
- Lee Sung-min as Han Pil-joo
- Nam Joo-hyuk as Park In-gyu
- Jung Man-sik as Kang Young-sik
- Park Geun-hyung as Kim Chi-duk
- Song Young-chang as Jeong Baek-jin
- Moon Chang-gil as Yang Seong-ik
- Park Byung-ho as Hisashi Tojo
- Park Se-hyun as Han Pil-joo's sister

== Release ==
The film was invited to the 42nd Hawaii International Film Festival. The film's distribution rights were pre-sold to 115 countries, including France, Russia, India, Hong Kong, Vietnam, Malaysia, Taiwan and Singapore, and North America.
