= Lee Il-hyung =

South Korean film director and screenwriter

- Born: South Korea
- Occupations: Film director, screenwriter

Korean name
- Hangul: 이일형
- Hanja: 李日亨
- RR: I Ilhyeong
- MR: I Irhyŏng

Lee Il-hyung (Korean: 이일형) is a South Korean film director and screenwriter. Prior to directing his first feature film A Violent Prosecutor (2016), Lee is an assistant director on films, such as The Moonlight of Seoul (2008), My Way (2011) and Kundo: Age of the Rampant (2014), and commercial films.

In 2016, he finally had his own opportunity to direct when he teamed up with the production company Sanai Pictures to make the thriller A Violent Prosecutor, which becomes the second highest-grossing South Korean film of 2016, with a US$66.6 million worldwide gross.

== Filmography ==
- The Moonlight of Seoul (2008) – assistant director, script editor
- My Way (2011) – assistant director
- Kundo: Age of the Rampant (2014) – assistant director, script editor
- A Violent Prosecutor (2016) – director, screenwriter
- Remember (2022) – director
- Karma (2025) – director, screenwriter
