= Spirits' Homecoming =

- Poster
- Hangul: 귀향
- RR: Gwihyang
- MR: Kwihyang
- Directed by: Cho Jung-rae
- Screenplay by: Cho Jung-rae
- Produced by: Im Seong-cheol; Cho Jung-rae
- Starring: Kang Ha-na; Choi Ri; Son Sook; Seo Mi-ji; Oh Ji-hye
- Cinematography: Kang Sang-hyup
- Edited by: Park Min-sun
- Production company: Jo Entertainment
- Distributed by: WAW Pictures
- Release date: February 24, 2016
- Running time: 127 minutes
- Country: South Korea
- Language: Korean
- Box office: US$24.3 million

Spirits' Homecoming (Korean: 귀향) is a 2016 South Korean period drama film written and directed by Cho Jung-rae. It was released in South Korea on February 24, 2016. Production of the film was halted several times due to financial issues, but was revived with additional 75,200 people contributing to the production fund. The screening date was delayed due to the lack of theaters willing to show the film. However, people bought tickets in advance and issued petitions for the movie to be screened in more cinemas. The first screening was March 1, the Anniversary of the Samil Independence Movement.

== Plot ==
In 1943 during the Japanese occupation of Korea, 14-year old Jung-min's family lives in poverty, but are happy, while 16-year old Young-hee has to take care of her younger brothers after their parents died during the war. One day, Japanese soldiers forcibly take the two girls from their homes, giving them just minutes to say goodbye and pack their clothes. They ship the girls to Manchuria in livestock wagons and use them as comfort women (pejoratively referred to in South Korea as 'Homecoming Women'), forcing them to give sexual services to soldiers of the Imperial Army.

Young-hee, Jung-min, and the others may only use Japanese, as speaking other languages is punishable. The girls are each given a tiny room with a bed in a brothel, with an endless flow of soldiers staying for 10 minutes each. The servicemen mistreat and beat them. Many have sadistic tendencies. Some of the girls and women are unable to cope with the constant rape and beatings, and lose their sanity. One of the soldiers treats Jung-min well and gives her a map. Jung-min, Young-hee, and four others plan an escape. However, one of them gets lost in the dark. The Japanese catch her and severely beat her. Jung-min and Young-hee witness this from a hideout and decide to return so the other girls won't be killed. During the night, Japanese soldiers torture the comfort women. In the morning they order the escapee, the one who became insane, and several injured women into a lorry, promising medical treatment in a bigger camp. However, the servicemen kill them and burn their corpses.

China and the Soviet Union start a counter-attack. The Japanese decide to kill all the comfort women and burn the corpses in an incinerator. Jung-min gives Young-hee her personal talisman and asks her to obey the orders, but the girls are saved by Korean Guerillas.

Young-hee and Jung-min escape the massacre hand in hand. As they walk through tall grass, a wounded Japanese soldier tries to kill them with his sword. Guerillas shoot the soldier and take the girls along, but the dying soldier shoots Jung-min. Young-hee returns home and lives a long life.

The secondary plotline follows an elderly woman and former comfort woman. She sews talismans for sale and does not want to remember those days. As other former comfort women begin to speak up, she decides to go public with her story. She visits a government office, but the officials mistreat her and express disgust towards the victims. The former comfort woman makes friends with her old shaman friend's young disciple, a medium who is able to channel spirits of the dead. The old woman asks the girl to call her 'Grandmother'. They visit her hometown together, although 'Grandmother' becomes upset as everything she remembers has changed. The young disciple channels the spirit of Jung-min, and elderly Young-hee experiences the events of her adolescence again. The disciple conducts a homecoming ritual for the spirits of comfort women killed by the Japanese. The spirit of Jung-min returns to her parents' house and the family shares a simple feast.

== Cast ==
- Kang Ha-na as Jung-min
- Choi Ri as Eun-kyung
- Son Sook as Young-ok (Young-hee)
- Seo Mi-ji as Young-hee
- Oh Ji-hye as Jung-min's mother
- Baek Su-ryun as Song-hee
- Cha Soon-hyeong as Yoshimi
- Hong Sena
- Jung In-gi as Jung-min's father
- Nam Sang-ji as Zhao Fei

== Background ==
The director Cho Jung-rae got the inspiration for the movie from a painting by Kang Il-chul. As a young girl, she was abused by the Japanese soldiers as a 'Comfort Woman'. The drawing shows a situation she experienced herself: Japanese soldiers pull the 'Comfort Women' who are suffering from diseases or weaknesses to the incinerator and shoot them. The soldiers then set the dead bodies on fire to destroy any proof of what they have done to the girls. Kang Il-chul drew the picture during a psychological treatment session. Through his movie, director Cho Jung-rae wanted to reach the 'Comfort Women' who cannot go back to their hometowns and wanted to console the damaged memories of the old 'Comfort Women'.

== Release ==
=== Reception ===
The film was number-one on its opening weekend in South Korea, with US$6.4 million.

=== Hug-together campaign ===
Jo Entertainment, the production company of the movie, created the 'Hug-Together Campaign' to promote the film. This campaign was held to cure the hurt and mental pain of former 'Comfort Women' by giving a warm and big hug. It was also pertinent to the modern people who suffer in their lives, work hard and have a wounded heart that needs a warm embrace.

== Awards and nominations ==
Year	Award	Category	Recipient	Result
2016	21st Chunsa Film Art Awards	People's Choice Most Popular Film Award	Spirits' Homecoming	Won
2016	3rd Korean Film Producers Association Awards	Best Creative Thinking	Spirits' Homecoming	Won
2016	37th Blue Dragon Film Awards	Best New Actress	Kang Ha-na	Nominated
2016	36th Korea Golden Cinema Film Festival	Best Cinematography (Rookie Award)	Kim Sang-hyup	Won
2016	36th Korea Golden Cinema Film Festival	Best New Director	Cho Jung-rae	Won
2016	36th Korea Golden Cinema Film Festival	Best New Actress	Seo Mi-ji	Won
2016	53rd Grand Bell Awards	Best Supporting Actress	Son Sook	Nominated
2016	53rd Grand Bell Awards	Best New Actress	Kang Ha-na	Nominated
2016	53rd Grand Bell Awards	Best New Actress	Choi Ri	Nominated
2016	53rd Grand Bell Awards	Best New Director	Cho Jung-rae	Won
2016	53rd Grand Bell Awards	New Rising Star Award	Choi Ri	Won
