= Choi Ri =

South Korean actress

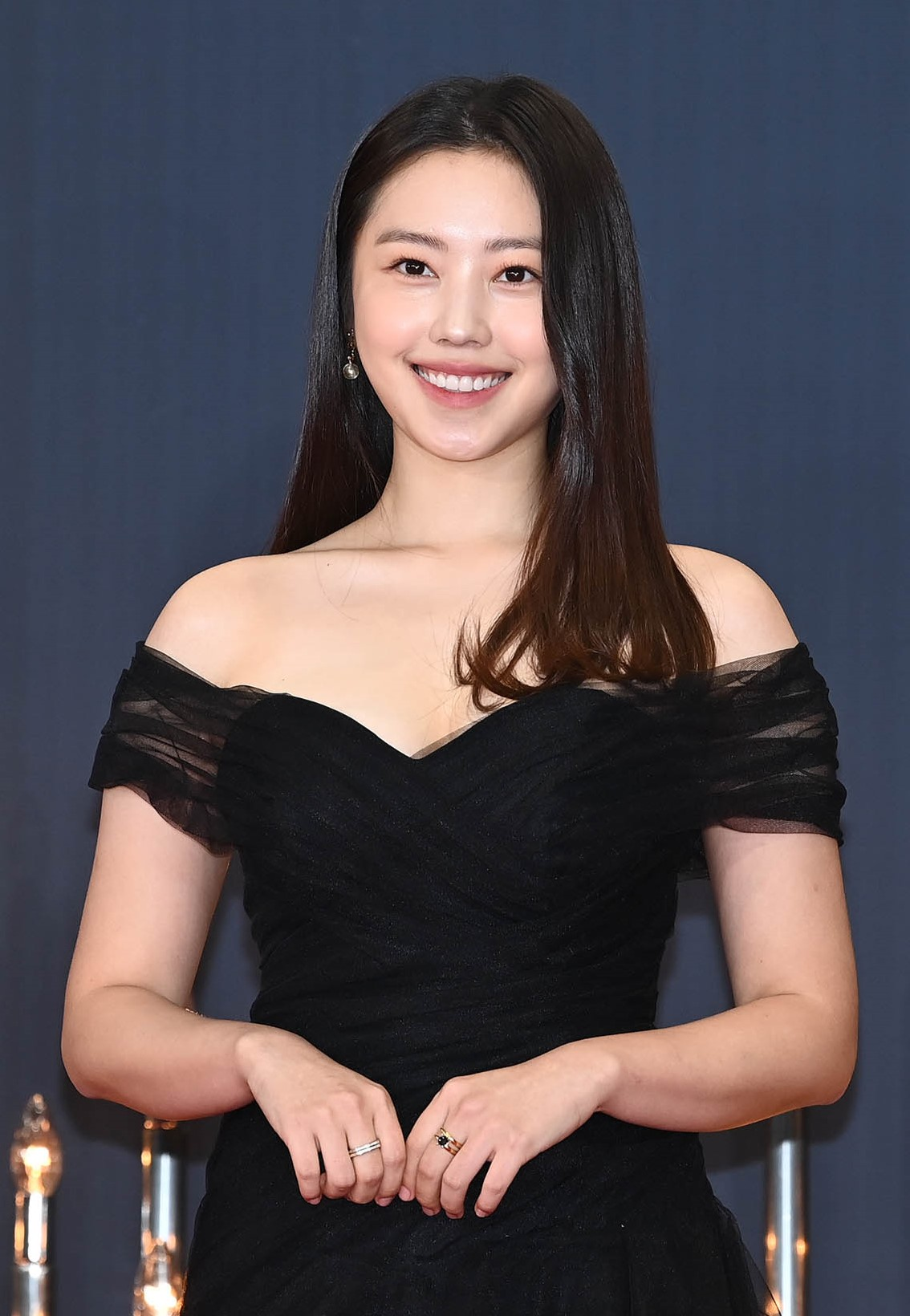
- Choi in 2022
- Born: June 29, 1995 (age 31); Geochang County, South Gyeongsang Province, South Korea
- Education: Chung-Ang University – Department of Dance
- Occupation: Actress
- Years active: 2016–present
- Agent: Artist Company

Korean name
- Hangul: 최리
- RR: Choe Ri
- MR: Ch'oe Ri

Choi Ri (born June 29, 1995) is a South Korean actress. She is best known for her role in the historical film Spirits' Homecoming.

== Filmography ==
=== Film ===
Year	Title	Role	Ref.
2017	Spirits' Homecoming	Eun-kyung	
2018	Keys to the Heart	Soo-jung	
2020	Whispering Corridors 6: The Humming		

=== Television series ===
Year	Title	Role	Ref.
2016	Blow Breeze	young Kim Soon-ok (guest)	
2016	Guardian: The Lonely and Great God	Park Kyung-mi	
2017	Witch at Court	Seo Yoo-ri	
2018	Welcome to Waikiki	Ji-min (guest)	
2018	Come and Hug Me	Chae Seo-jin	
2019	My First First Love	Oh Ga-rin	
2020	Birthcare Center	Lee Roo-da	
2022	Bloody Heart	Jo Yeon-hee	

== Awards and nominations ==
Name of the award ceremony, year presented, category, nominee of the award, and the result of the nomination
Award ceremony	Year	Category	Nominee / Work	Result	Ref.
Asia Model Awards	2016	New Star Award	—N/a	Won	
Golden Cinema Film Festival	2018	Best New Actress	Keys to the Heart	Won	
Grand Bell Awards	2016	Best New Actress	Spirits' Homecoming	Nominated	
Grand Bell Awards	2016	New Rising Award	Spirits' Homecoming	Won	
KBS Drama Awards	2022	Best New Actress	Bloody Heart	Nominated	
