= Time Renegades =

- Poster
- Directed by: Kwak Jae-yong
- Written by: Go Jung-woon
- Produced by: Lee Jin-eun; Ahn Sang-hoon; Bang Ok-kyung
- Starring: Im Soo-jung; Jo Jung-suk; Lee Jin-wook
- Cinematography: Lee Sung-je
- Music by: Kim Jun-seong
- Production companies: CJ Entertainment; Sangsang Film
- Distributed by: CJ Entertainment
- Release date: April 13, 2016 (South Korea)
- Running time: 107 minutes
- Country: South Korea
- Language: Korean
- Box office: US$8.4 million

Time Renegades (Korean: 시간이탈자; Hanja: 時間離脫者; RR: Siganitalja) is a 2016 South Korean science fiction romantic thriller film directed by Kwak Jae-yong. It was released in South Korea by CJ Entertainment on April 13, 2016.

== Plot ==
On January 1, 1983, New Year's Eve celebration, high school teacher Ji-hwan (Jo Jeong-seok) proposes to his colleague and girlfriend, Yoon-Jung (Im Soo-Jung). Shortly after his proposal, Yoon-Jung notices her purse has been slashed and emptied which prompts Ji-hwan to run after the robber. They fight and end with Ji-hwan being fatally stabbed. On New Year's Eve celebration in 2015, rookie Detective Gun-woo (Lee Jin-wook) and his colleagues try to find a suspect in the crowd. Finding him, the detectives run after the suspect, and one of them fights him. Detective Gun-woo, confused about whether he can shoot the suspect in that situation, ends up getting fatally shot himself. 32 years apart, Ji-hwan and Gun-woo were taken to the same hospital on the same day and time. Both survived from life-and-death situations and began to see through each other's eyes when they dream. The two men didn't believe it was real at first but eventually found clues connecting.

While Gun-woo was reviewing surveillance videos of a street, he noticed a woman walking by who looked similar to Ji-hwan's fiancée, Yoon-jung. He takes the chance and tries to follow the woman, whose name turns out to be So-eun, but is instead mistaken as a flasher. He denies this and claims that he is a detective, but no one believes him. So-Eun, with the help of bystanders, brings the Gun-woo to the station, where it is proved that he is a Detective.

One day, the Chief of Police asks Gun-woo to file their reports on cold cases where he finds the report on an unsolved murder case in the 1980s with Yoon-Jung being the victim. Ji-hwan learns from the dream about Yoon-Jung's upcoming demise and decides to guard Yoon-Jung on that day. However, Yoon-Jung insisted on going out alone as she was about to fit her wedding dress. Ji-hwan becomes busy with his class and misses the time. Upon realization, he runs to find Yoon-Jung but the streets are blocked by police due to an air strike. He decided to instead find the suspect, whose file he had read through the dream. He goes to a gambling house to find the man gambling but when he announces his name, he runs thinking Ji-hwan is a person he owes money from. The man loses Ji-hwan and bumps into Yoon-Jung who drops to the floor. His eyes fell to her handbag which showed a stash of cash. Later, Yoon-Jung goes into a public restroom to clean herself up. Ji-hwan then ran into the suspect who was hurriedly exiting the restroom with hands that were now bloody and was carrying a woman's purse. He rushes to the restroom and finds Yoon-Jung dead.

The suspect turned out to be the father of Ji-hwan's student. However, a series of events and succeeding deaths with similar methods revealed that he is not the real suspect. So-Eun turns out to be working in the same school where the couple taught and is helping Gun-woo put the pieces of events together. However, after growing closer to each other, So-Eun appears to be killed with the same method as Yoon-Jung and other victims from the past which revealed that the serial killer may still be alive. The two men become more determined to solve the case.

== Cast ==
- Im Soo-jung as Seo Yoon-jung / Jung So-eun,
- Jo Jung-suk as Baek Ji-hwan, A 1983 high-school teacher who meets 2015 homicide detective Kim Gun-woo in his dreams.
- Lee Jin-wook as Kim Gun-woo, A 2015 homicide detective who meets 1983 high school teacher Baek Ji-hwan in his dreams.
- Jung Jin-young as Chief Kang (Kang Seung-beom)
  - Lee Tae-ri as young Kang Seung-beom
- Lee Ki-woo as Detective Lee
- On Joo-wan as Teacher Park
- Jun Shin-hwan as Biology teacher/Gas-Masked Murderer
- Kim Bo-ra as Choi Hyun-joo, Chief Kang's wife.
- Jung Woong-in as Kang Hyung-chul, Kang Seung-beom's father, who was imprisoned after being framed for a murder that he never committed by the Gas Masked Murderer.
- Lee Bom as Dodge ball student
- Park Ah-sung as Science lab male student

== Reception ==
=== Box office ===
The film was number-one on its opening weekend in South Korea with US$2.5 million and a total of 547,000 admissions and US$3.94 million on its first five days.
