= Tunnel (2016 film) =

- Theatrical release poster
- Directed by: Kim Seong-hun
- Written by: Kim Seong-hun
- Produced by: Billy Acumen; Lee Taek-dong; You Jeong-hun
- Starring: Ha Jung-woo; Bae Doona; Oh Dal-su
- Cinematography: Kim Tae-seong
- Edited by: Kim Chang-ju
- Music by: Mok Young-jin; Vitek Kral
- Production company: B.A Entertainment
- Distributed by: Showbox
- Release date: 10 August 2016 (South Korea)
- Running time: 127 minutes
- Country: South Korea
- Language: Korean
- Box office: $51.9 million

Tunnel (Korean: 터널) is a 2016 South Korean survival drama film written and directed by Kim Seong-hun, starring Ha Jung-woo in the lead role. The film revolves around a car salesman who gets trapped when a poorly constructed tunnel collapses, and deals with his survival inside the tunnel with the advice of the rescue team head. It was released in South Korea on 10 August 2016.

== Plot ==
Lee Jung-soo is an automobile salesperson heading back for Seoul, when the recently opened Hado Tunnel collapses over him, trapping him inside the car underneath the rubble of concrete and steel. With little reception, Jung-soo manages to contact emergency services for help, as news of the tunnel collapse reaches his wife, Se-hyun. As rescuers set up camp outside the relatively intact portal of the tunnel, a local news crew tries to contact Jung-soo for a special interview, but is interrupted by the rescue chief, Kim Dae-kyung, who berates them for their disregard of Jung-soo's life for their ratings.

Under the advice of Dae-kyung, Jung-soo must conserve the phone's battery to remain in contact and to ration two water bottles and a birthday cake originally meant for his daughter Su-jin, in order to stay alive long enough while Dae-kyung inspects the darkened tunnel only to realize they were close to Jung-soo. However, the tunnel began to cave in further, narrowly burying him and his colleague as they manage to escape. The vibrations of the collapse leads Jung-soo to spot the #3 on the ventilation fan; Dae-kyung uses this as a reference point to devise a plan for workers to both excavate through the tunnel and drill above Jung-soo to rescue him.

Three days later, Jung-soo is alerted by the presence of a pet dog Taeng belonging to Mi-na, another trapped motorist who is impaled by the steel rebar during the collapse. Jung-soo tells her that a rescue operation is underway, but Mi-na succumbs to her injuries. On the eighteenth day of the rescue, when Jung-soo doesn't hear the drillers nearby, Dae-kyung is notified that the maps he is using was incorrect and realized that they have drilled the wrong place and must restart the excavation operation. A demoralized Jung-soo contemplates giving up, but Se-hyun in response threatens that she will kill herself along with her daughter and urges him not to give up, just as his phone battery runs out. Public opinion over the rescue operation of Jung-soo – whose chances of survival were already in doubt – began to sour, culminating in an accident that costed the life of an excavation worker; his elderly mother throws eggs at Se-hyun, blaming her for her son's death.

Se-hyun is left with no choice but to sign the agreement to stop the rescue operation and resume construction of the Second Hado Tunnel, which had been postponed since the tunnel's collapse, and will almost certainly kill Jung-soo. As she signs the contract, she makes a tearful message on a radio to Jung-soo. In his last ditch attempt, Dae-kyung lowers himself through the drill hole using the sound detector to locate Jung-soo. Simultaneously, Jung-soo crawls back to Mi-na's car and sounds the horn, which is picked up by Dae-kyung's sound probe, but was too late for Dae-kyung to warn the workers from detonating the explosives, causing vibrations that sends rubble raining down on, and seemingly burying Jung-soo.

Rescuers were able to dig through the tunnel, finally reaching the now barely conscious Jung-soo along with Mi-na's pet dog after being trapped in the tunnel for 35 days, having narrowly avoided being crushed by falling debris. Dae-kyung, repeating Jung-soo's words to the surrounding politicians and press, lets out a profanity laden exclamation to back off. Jung-soo nonetheless affirms praise for the rescue operation, though Dae-kyung is subsequently made to write a report for public profanity. Jung-soo, now recovered from his injuries, sits in the passenger seat as Se-hyun drives through the tunnel. Already rattled by his experiences, he and Se-hyun hold hands as they emerge out of the tunnel.

== Cast ==
- Ha Jung-woo as Lee Jung-soo

One of the survivors of the 'Hado' Tunnel collapse. He works as a dealer for Kia Motors and operates a Kia Optima, and has a wife and a daughter who goes to kindergarten. He is known to have good business skills, good relationships, and a generous personality.

- Bae Doona as Se-hyun

Jeong-su's wife. During the accident, she volunteers at the scene and talks with the rescue team leader to maintain the hope of a rescue of Jeong-su. The rescue operation is delayed longer than expected and she has eggs thrown at her by the mother of a work leader who died in a random industrial accident during rescue operations.

- Oh Dal-su as Kim Dae-kyung

119 Rescue Team Leader. He was a rather serious figure as the "expert" of the original, but Oh Dal-soo's role in the movie added to his comic. He is the most conscientious and professional person in the work as a veteran rescue leader. Except for Jeong-su's family, this person and the work leader are the only ones who really believed in Jeong-su's survival and tried to rescue him until the end. He did not provide any direct help to Jeong-su, but he also gave him the advice he needed to survive in the early stages.

- Nam Ji-hyun as Mi-na

One of the victims of the 'Hado' Tunnel collapse with Jeong-su. She is also the owner of the dog, Taeng.

- Kim Hae-sook as government Minister
- Park Hyuk-kwon as government official
- Park Jin-woo as government aide
- Lee Sang-hee as YTN news reporter
- Kim Jong-soo as drilling company executive (cameo)
- Shin Jung-keun as Captain Kang
- Cho Hyun-chul as young guy with spectacles in rescue team
- Yoo Seung-mok as reporter Jo
- Lee Dong-jin as radio DJ
- Lee Cheol-min as Captain of drilling team
- Han Sung-chun as drone technician
- Kim Seung-hoon as public hearing moderator
- Ye Soo-jung as old mother
- Jin Yong-ok as construction worker A
- Lee Dong-yong as construction worker B
- Joo Suk-tae as employee of Korea Expressway Corporation
- Ahn Se-ho as drilling team member
- Seo Hyun-woo as SNC fellow reporter
- Kang Shin-chul as agent at situation
- Kim Soo-jin as Public hearing attendee B
- Jin Seon-kyu as equipment manager
- Yeo Min-gyu as voice of 119 telephone operator, helicopter agent
- Kim Sung-kyu as Civic group member 3
- Choi Gwi-hwa as person interested in tunnel 2 (cameo)
- Jung Suk-yong as Team Leader Choi (cameo)
- Hwang Byeng-gug as gas station owner (cameo)
- Bae Yoo-ram as 119 rescue worker (cameo)

== Production ==
Many audiences who watched the movie said that it was reminiscent of the Sinking of MV Sewol in 2014. However, the film was based on an original novel published before the aforementioned incident. Director Kim Sung-hoon said in an interview, "It (sinking of MV Sewol) was such a big pain and the production team was also very sick." "Since the sadness is still valid, I couldn't help but think of the sinking of MV Sewol when I made the disaster material film, but I thought it was impossible to exclude the memory and take it." On the one hand, " one incident rather than focusing on pursuant to a huge disaster happened, and universal since the system should be run by him collapsed, and some by a man trapped in it want to say things like dignity for the life situation."

Although 'Tunnel' was a domestic box office hit, some pointed out its regret due to the unrealism of the optimistic attitude depicted in the film since South Korean audiences witnessed how the social system of disaster works during the fiasco of the MV Sewol rescue operation. The director explained that he also heard such opinions in an interview: "There were some opinions that want me to be more directly explained. However, I hoped that this movie would not be a movie that only people who are angry about such a disaster would watch. Some movies portray social evil and get angry with the system, and they can scratch people's emotions like that." However, he continued: "I wanted the movie to be more sympathetic to pain. I think what we are doing the most is the lack of ability to empathize with other people's pain."

The director added, "I put a lot of effort into organizing the tunnel set in the movie. As the inside of the collapsed tunnel continues to appear, he wanted to devise the most realistic part of the movie. "One of the words that can describe this movie is its texture. I thought the texture should not look fake. For Jeong-su, the tunnel is like an actor. The actors and the space have to give and receive reactions from each other." he said.

During filming, the real concrete part and the fake part found in the collapsed tunnel set were mixed together; the real one was placed farther from the actor, whilst the fake dust is poured right by the actor. The fake dust is made out of dust powder, grain powder, charcoal powder, and jade powder, which was used due to potential health concerns should the person inhaled actual concrete dust during the filming process.

== Reception ==
On the review aggregator website Rotten Tomatoes, 100% of 15 critics' reviews are positive, with an average rating of 7.6/10. Frank Scheck of The Hollywood Reporter praised the film for its attraction and humor, as well as for its special effects and cinematography, writing "Infusing its nightmarish scenario with bracing doses of satirical humor, Tunnel is smarter and more sophisticated than most Hollywood attempts at the genre." Gary Goldstein of the Los Angeles Times characterized the film as "vivid" and "relatable". Jay Weissberg of Variety praised the director, Kim Seong-hun, and the actors, and wrote "much of the film's appeal is that it tosses aside the monumental and focuses instead on character". Tom Keogh of The Seattle Times also praised the director and rated the film 3 out of 4 stars. Garry Garrison of The Playlist stated, "so, while at times it's easy to see the great film that 'Tunnel' could have been, that never stops it from being perfectly watchable thriller that it is." Kim Yu-young of The Korea Herald praised the director and actors Ha Jung-woo, Bae Doona, and Oh Dal-su, describing them as "undeniable chemistry that is consistently palpable and carried well throughout the movie." Andrew Saroch of Far East Films described the film as "tense" and "thoughtful". The film was also reviewed by Jason Bechervaise of Screen Daily, and by Shim Sun-ah of Yonhap News Agency. The film also received a rating of 7.4 by users on Metacritic.

== Awards and nominations ==
Year	Award	Category	Recipient	Result
2016	37th Blue Dragon Film Awards	Best Actor	Ha Jung-woo	Nominated
2016	37th Blue Dragon Film Awards	Best Supporting Actor	Oh Dal-su	Nominated
2016	37th Blue Dragon Film Awards	Best Supporting Actress	Bae Doona	Nominated
2016	37th Blue Dragon Film Awards	Best Screenplay	Kim Sung-hoon; So Jae-won	Nominated
2016	37th Blue Dragon Film Awards	Best Editing	Kim Chang-joo	Nominated
2016	37th Blue Dragon Film Awards	Technical Award	Kim Nam-sik (Visual Effects)	Nominated
2016	37th Blue Dragon Film Awards	Popular Star Award	Bae Doona	Won
2016	53rd Grand Bell Awards	Best Actor	Ha Jung-woo	Nominated
2016	53rd Grand Bell Awards	Best Actress	Bae Doona	Nominated
2016	53rd Grand Bell Awards	Best Supporting Actor	Oh Dal-su	Nominated
2017	53rd Baeksang Arts Awards	Best Actor	Ha Jung-woo	Nominated
2017	53rd Baeksang Arts Awards	Best Supporting Actress	Bae Doona	Nominated
2017	22nd Chunsa Film Awards	Best Actor	Ha Jung-woo	Won
2017	22nd Chunsa Film Awards	Best Supporting Actress	Bae Doona	Nominated
2017	26th Buil Film Awards	Best Supporting Actress	Bae Doona	Nominated
