= The Wailing (2016 film) =

2016 South Korean film by Na Hong-jin

- Theatrical release poster
- Hangul: 곡성
- Hanja: 哭聲
- RR: Gokseong
- MR: Koksŏng
- Directed by: Na Hong-jin
- Written by: Na Hong-jin
- Produced by: Suh Dong-hyun; Kim Ho-sung
- Starring: Kwak Do-won; Hwang Jung-min; Chun Woo-hee; Jun Kunimura
- Cinematography: Hong Kyung-pyo
- Edited by: Kim Sun-min
- Music by: Jang Young-gyu; Dalpalan
- Production companies: Side Mirror; Fox International Productions
- Distributed by: 20th Century Fox
- Release date: May 12, 2016 (South Korea)
- Running time: 156 minutes
- Country: South Korea
- Languages: Korean; Japanese
- Budget: US$8 million
- Box office: US$51.3 million

The Wailing (Korean: 곡성; RR: Gokseong) is a 2016 South Korean supernatural horror film written and directed by Na Hong-jin and starring Kwak Do-won, Hwang Jung-min and Chun Woo-hee. The film centers on a policeman who investigates a series of mysterious killings and illnesses in a remote Korean village in order to save his daughter. The film was both a commercial and critical success.

== Plot ==
A mysterious Japanese man arrives in Gokseong, a small village in the mountains of South Korea. Soon after, a bizarre infection breaks out, causing villagers to become deranged and violently kill their families. Officer Jong-goo's daughter, Hyo-jin, becomes one of the infected. Jong-goo then meets a mysterious young woman named Moo-myeong, who claims the Japanese stranger is an evil spirit. A local hunter reports seeing the stranger with glowing red eyes eating a deer carcass. After a series of disturbing events and violent deaths, Jong-goo enlists the help of a Japanese-speaking deacon, Yang I-sam. They investigate the stranger's house, discovering a shrine with photos and belongings of the murdered villagers, including Hyo-jin's shoe.

As Hyo-jin's condition worsens, Jong-goo confronts the stranger, ordering him to leave the village. Jong-goo's family discovers a dead goat hanging at their gate, and Hyo-jin stabs their neighbor to death. A shaman named Il-gwang is consulted, who claims the stranger is a demon and performs a death-hex ritual. Jong-goo stops the ritual midway, instead taking Hyo-jin to the hospital. The next day, Jong-goo and his companions hunt down the stranger but are attacked by the reanimated corpse of another victim, giving the stranger time to flee. They eventually kill him, and Hyo-jin's health improves.

Il-gwang encounters Moo-myeong and vomits blood. After his ritual fails, he leaves town in terror but a swarm of flying insects stops him. He calls Jong-goo, warning that Moo-myeong is the real demon, and the stranger was a shaman who was trying to kill her. Meanwhile, Yang I-sam receives news that his uncle Oh Seong-bok has killed his family. Jong-goo goes home and finds that Hyo-jin has disappeared.

While looking for Hyo-Jin, Jong-goo runs into Moo-myeong, who he confronts about Hyo-jin's whereabouts. Moo-myeong claims his daughter is possessed by the stranger, who is consuming her life force. She also tells him his daughter is still alive, has just returned and will kill his family. She reveals that she has set a trap for the demon, and that all Jong-goo has to do is remain there and wait. Jong-goo replies that he is not sure if he believes her. The shaman phones him and says he must not let Moo-myeong tempt him. Moo-myeong instructs him to simply wait until the third crow of the rooster. Meanwhile, Hyo-jin returns home possessed and while eating with her hands, eyes a knife in the kitchen.

While Jong-goo is engaged with Moo-myeong, Yang I-sam returns to the stranger's house armed with a sickle and finds him alive inside a cave. Yang promises to leave if the stranger reveals his true form. The stranger chuckles at this. Jong-goo notices Moo-myeong is wearing items of the victims and sees his daughter's hairpin on the ground. Believing this to be proof that she is responsible for the infection, he returns home before the rooster's third crow. Upon returning home, Jong-goo discovers that Hyo-jin has slaughtered his wife and mother-in-law; she then attacks him.

Meanwhile, the stranger repeatedly photographs Yang I-sam. He then assumes his true appearance—that of a red-eyed demon, bearing stigmata. Il-gwang returns with a camera in his hand and finds Jong-goo's dead family as Hyo-jin sits in a trance and Jong-goo lies dying. Il-gwang photographs the dead family members, then returns to his car and retrieves a box which he drops, revealing photos of other families and victims of the demon. Jong-goo reminisces about the happy times with his daughter as he dies.

=== Deleted ending ===
In a deleted ending, the stranger is seen sitting on a bench by the roadside. He spots a family on the road and entices a child to him by offering her candy. The mom picks up the child before she reaches the stranger. Il-gwang arrives in a car to pick up the stranger. Moo-myeong watches as the car fades away on the horizon.

== Cast ==
- Kwak Do-won as Jong-goo, policeman and father of Hyo-Jin.
- Hwang Jung-min as Il-gwang, a shaman hired to protect the village.
- Chun Woo-hee as Moo-myung, the woman in white.
- Jun Kunimura as a Japanese stranger.
- Kim Hwan-hee as Hyo-jin, Jong-goo's daughter.
- Her Jin as Jong-goo's mother-in-law.
- Jang So-yeon as Jong-goo's wife.
- Kim Do-yoon as Yang I-sam, a Japanese-speaking deacon.
- Son Gang-guk as Oh Seong-bok, Jong-goo's police partner.
- Park Sung-yeon as Kwon Myeong-joo.
- Kil Chang-gyoo as Park Choon-bae.
- Jeon Bae-soo as Deok-gi.
- Jeong Mi-nam as Heung-gook.
- Choi Gwi-hwa as Byeong-gyoo.
- Lee Seon-hee as Byeong-gyu's wife.
- Jo Yeon-hee as Bar hostess.
- Baek Seung-cheol as Friend.
- Kwon Hyeok-joon as Friend.
- Park Chae-ik as Friend.
- Kim Gi-cheon as Dispatch Captain.
- Yoo Soon-woong as Chief of Police.
- Jo Han-cheol as Detective 1.
- Kim Song-il as Police.
- Bae Yong-geun as Police.
- Im Jae-il as Police.
- Lee In-cheol as Father.
- Jo Seon-joo as Bar hostess.
- Lee Chang-hoon as Doctor.
- Kim Ah-ra as Dermatology Nurse.
- Kim Ji-won as Nurse.

== Release and reception ==
=== Release ===
The Wailing was released in South Korea on 12 May 2016. The film was shown in the Out of Competition section at the Cannes Film Festival in France on 18 May and was released in the United States on 27 May.

The film had special screening in the Korean Horizons section of the 25th New York Asian Film Festival on 19 July 2026 as part of the 25th anniversary of the festival.

=== Critical response ===
The Wailing received widespread critical acclaim. On review aggregator website Rotten Tomatoes, the film has an approval rating of 99% and an average rating of 8/10, based on 86 critical reviews. The site's critics consensus reads: "The Wailing delivers an atmospheric, cleverly constructed mystery whose supernatural thrills more than justify its imposing length." On review aggregator website Metacritic, the film has a weighted average score of 81 out of 100 based on 19 critics, indicating "universal acclaim".

Deborah Young of The Hollywood Reporter added: "As dark and pessimistic as the rest of South Korean thrill-master Na Hong Jin's work, The Wailing (Goksung, a.k.a. The Strangers in France) is long and involving, permeated by a tense, sickening sense of foreboding, yet finally registers on a slightly lower key than the director's acclaimed genre films The Chaser (2008) and The Yellow Sea (2010), both of which also got their start in Cannes." Maggie Lee of Variety noted: "There's nothing scarier than not knowing what you should be scared of. "The Wailing" erupts with a string of gruesome deaths in an insular village, but the investigation unleashes a greater terror — that of the paranoid imagination." David Ehrlich of IndieWire stated: ""The Wailing" boasts all the tenets and tropes of a traditional horror movie, but it doesn't bend them to the same, stifling ends that define Hollywood's recent contributions to the genre ... There's a looseness here that's missing from mainstream American horror, a sense that absolutely anything can happen next (and always does)."

=== Awards and nominations ===
Year	Award	Category	Recipient	Result
2016	25th Buil Film Awards	Best Film	The Wailing	Nominated
2016	25th Buil Film Awards	Best Director	Na Hong-jin	Nominated
2016	25th Buil Film Awards	Best Actor	Kwak Do-won	Nominated
2016	25th Buil Film Awards	Best Supporting Actor	Hwang Jung-min	Nominated
2016	25th Buil Film Awards	Best Supporting Actor	Jun Kunimura	Nominated
2016	25th Buil Film Awards	Best Supporting Actress	Chun Woo-hee	Nominated
2016	25th Buil Film Awards	Best New Actress	Kim Hwan-hee	Nominated
2016	25th Buil Film Awards	Best Cinematography	Hong Kyong-pyo	Nominated
2016	25th Buil Film Awards	Best Art Direction	Lee Hoo-kyeong	Nominated
2016	25th Buil Film Awards	Best Music	Jang Young-gyu & Dalpalan	Nominated
2016	37th Blue Dragon Film Awards	Best Film	The Wailing	Nominated
2016	37th Blue Dragon Film Awards	Best Director	Na Hong-jin	Won
2016	37th Blue Dragon Film Awards	Best Actor	Kwak Do-won	Nominated
2016	37th Blue Dragon Film Awards	Best Supporting Actor	Jun Kunimura	Won
2016	37th Blue Dragon Film Awards	Best Supporting Actress	Chun Woo-hee	Nominated
2016	37th Blue Dragon Film Awards	Best New Actress	Kim Hwan-hee	Nominated
2016	37th Blue Dragon Film Awards	Popularity Award	Jun Kunimura	Won
2016	37th Blue Dragon Film Awards	Best Screenplay	Na Hong-jin	Nominated
2016	37th Blue Dragon Film Awards	Best Cinematography	Hong Kyong-pyo	Nominated
2016	37th Blue Dragon Film Awards	Best Editing	Kim Sun-min	Won
2016	37th Blue Dragon Film Awards	Best Art Direction	Lee Hoo-kyeong	Nominated
2016	37th Blue Dragon Film Awards	Best Lighting	Kim Chang-ho	Nominated
2016	37th Blue Dragon Film Awards	Best Music	Jang Yeong-gyoo and Dalpalan	Won
2016	Bucheon International Fantastic Film Festival	Audience Award	The Wailing	Won
2016	Bucheon International Fantastic Film Festival	Best of Bucheon Award	Na Hong-jin	Won
2016	Fantasia International Film Festival	Prix AQCC	Na Hong-jin	Won
2016	Fantasia International Film Festival	Audience Award for Best Asian Feature	Na Hong-jin	3rd place
2016	53rd Grand Bell Awards	Best Film	The Wailing	Nominated
2016	53rd Grand Bell Awards	Best Director	Na Hong-jin	Nominated
2016	53rd Grand Bell Awards	Best Actor	Kwak Do-won	Nominated
2016	53rd Grand Bell Awards	Best Supporting Actor	Hwang Jung-min	Nominated
2016	53rd Grand Bell Awards	Best Supporting Actress	Chun Woo-hee	Nominated
2016	53rd Grand Bell Awards	Best New Actress	Kim Hwan-hee	Won
2016	53rd Grand Bell Awards	Best Cinematography	Hong Kyung-pyo	Won
2016	53rd Grand Bell Awards	Best Recording	Kim Shin-yong	Won
2016	53rd Grand Bell Awards	Best Lightning	Kim Chang-ho	Won
2016	53rd Grand Bell Awards	Best Editing	Kim Sun-min	Won
2016	36th Korean Association of Film Critics Awards	Top Films of the Year	The Wailing	Won
2016	Korean Film Actor's Association Awards	Top Director Award	Na Hong-jin	Won
2016	Korean Film Actor's Association Awards	Top Star Award	Kwak Do-won	Won
2016	Korean Film Producers Association Awards	Best Director	Na Hong-jin	Won
2016	Korean Film Producers Association Awards	Best Cinematography	Hong Kyung-pyo	Won
2016	Korean Film Producers Association Awards	Best Lighting	Kim Chang-ho	Won
2016	Phoenix Critics Circle	Best International Film	The Wailing	Nominated
2016	Sitges Film Festival	Focus Asia Award	Na Hong-jin	Won
2016	Sitges Film Festival	Best Cinematography	Hong Kyung-pyo	Won
2016	BloodGuts UK Horror Awards	Best International Film	The Wailing	Nominated
2016	BloodGuts UK Horror Awards	Best Director	Na Hong-jin	Nominated
2016	BloodGuts UK Horror Awards	Best Actor in an International Film	Kwak Do-won	Won
2016	BloodGuts UK Horror Awards	Best Actor in an International Film	Hwang Jung-min	Nominated
2016	BloodGuts UK Horror Awards	Best Actress in an International Film	Chun Woo-hee	Nominated
2016	Molins de Rei Horror Film Festival	Special Mention	Hong Kyung-pyo	Won
2016	Molins de Rei Horror Film Festival	Best Film	The Wailing	Nominated
2016	Saskatoon Fantastic Film Festival	Honourable Mention	The Wailing	Won
2016	CPH:PIX	Politiken's Audience Award	The Wailing	Nominated
2017	11th Asian Film Awards	Best Film	The Wailing	Nominated
2017	11th Asian Film Awards	Best Director	Na Hong-jin	Won
2017	11th Asian Film Awards	Best Supporting Actor	Jun Kunimura	Nominated
2017	11th Asian Film Awards	Best Sound	Kim Dong-han	Nominated
2017	Central Ohio Film Critics Association Awards	Best Foreign Language Film	The Wailing	Nominated
2017	KOFRA Film Awards	Best Film	The Wailing	Won
2017	KOFRA Film Awards	Best Director	Na Hong-jin	Won
2017	Seattle Film Critics Awards	Best Foreign Language Film	The Wailing	Nominated
2017	Korea Cable TV Awards	Cable VOD Grand Prize (Film)	The Wailing	Won
2017	Fangoria Chainsaw Awards	Best Foreign-Language Film	The Wailing	Nominated
2017	53rd Baeksang Arts Awards	Best Film	The Wailing	Won
2017	53rd Baeksang Arts Awards	Best Director	Na Hong-jin	Nominated
2017	53rd Baeksang Arts Awards	Best Actor	Kwak Do-won	Nominated
2017	53rd Baeksang Arts Awards	Best Supporting Actress	Chun Woo-hee	Nominated
2017	53rd Baeksang Arts Awards	Best New Actress	Kim Hwan-hee	Nominated
2017	53rd Baeksang Arts Awards	Best Screenplay	Na Hong-jin	Nominated
2017	22nd Chunsa Film Awards	Best Director	Na Hong-jin	Won
2017	22nd Chunsa Film Awards	Best Actor	Kwak Do-won	Nominated
2017	22nd Chunsa Film Awards	Best Supporting Actor	Hwang Jung-min	Nominated
2017	22nd Chunsa Film Awards	Best Supporting Actress	Chun Woo-hee	Nominated
2017	22nd Chunsa Film Awards	Best Screenplay	Na Hong-jin	Nominated
2017	22nd Chunsa Film Awards	Technical Award	Jang Yeong-gyoo and Dalpalan	Nominated
2017	Academy of Science Fiction, Fantasy and Horror Films	Best DVD/Blu-Ray Release	The Wailing	Nominated
2017	iHorror Awards	Best Foreign Horror	The Wailing	Nominated
