= A Violent Prosecutor =

- Theatrical release poster
- Hangul: 검사외전
- Hanja: 檢事外傳
- RR: Geomsaoejeon
- MR: Kŏmsaoejŏn
- Directed by: Lee Il-hyung
- Written by: Lee Il-hyung
- Produced by: Han Jae-duk; Yoon Jong-bin; Guk Su-ran; Valerie Walsh Valdes
- Starring: Hwang Jung-min; Gang Dong-won
- Cinematography: Choi Chan-min
- Edited by: Kim Sang-bum; Kim Jae-bum
- Music by: Hwang Sang-jun
- Production companies: Sanai Pictures; Moonlight Film; Nickelodeon Movies
- Distributed by: Showbox
- Release date: February 3, 2016
- Running time: 126 minutes
- Countries: South Korea; United States
- Languages: Korean; English
- Box office: US$66.6 million

A Violent Prosecutor is a 2016 South Korean and American crime comedy film written and directed by Lee Il-hyung, produced by Han Jae-duk, Yoon Jong-bin, Guk Su-ran, and Valerie Walsh Valdes, and starring Hwang Jung-min and Gang Dong-won. It was released in South Korea on February 3, 2016, by Showbox.

== Plot ==
Byun Jae-wook is a short-tempered prosecutor who only pursues the truth. He is notorious for his rough and tough investigations. A suspect who is a small-time criminal, under the interrogation of Jae-wook, is then found dead. All the evidence indicate Jae-wook as the criminal. Jae-wook is prosecuted and gets 15 years in prison.

At first he is ill-treated by the prisoners. He helps some guards to avoid court room fees and in other legal matters. This gains him a special position in prison. He helps out both the officers and prisoners who are in jail through his legal knowledge and experiences. This makes prisoners loyal to him and he treats them well whenever he receives gifts from the guards. He shares food and cigarettes to other inmates. People in jail call him "Sir Young Gam" which means Elder. One day a man who owns a company comes to him and asks advice regarding a man he beat up because of raping his daughter. He gives him an answer. The prisoner then asks what he could do for Jae-wook, answering he would know at a later time.

Five years later, Jae-wook meets young fraudster Chi-won, in prison. Chi-won knows details about Jae-wook's case. Jae-wook trains Chi-won to carry out his plan outside of prison. Using his knowledge as a former prosecutor, he gets Chi-won free. Jae-wook prepares a counterattack on those who framed him.

Chi-won meets up with one of the friends of the suspect in Jae-wook's murder case. The man admitted that the suspect indeed had asthma and had to have an inhaler with him all the time, unbeknownst to him he was being recorded by Chi-won who sends the file back to Jae-wook. Jae-wook prepares papers for his parole and sends the file along with the recording to the judge holding his case. this information reaches the congressional candidate who was assistant general of the prosecutors office and does all means to shut the case down. The whistleblower was found and was beaten until half his body had been paralyzed. Fearing for his own life Chi-won takes the chance to get away from Jae-wook. When Jae-wook realized Chi-won's plan he seeks the help of the prisoners whom he formerly assisted in their cases. Jae-wook and Chi-won get together and start planning against Jong-gil who was the Asst. Prosecutor General during Jae-wook's trial period and the person who had convinced Jae-wook to defend himself in a self-defense manner which resulted in his jail time. In the flashbacks shown It is revealed that Jong-gil, who is running in an upcoming election now, then was working with a builder to encroach an ecologically significant land and had visited the interrogation room, beating up the prisoner and getting hold of his inhaler, leading to the prisoner's death by suffocation.

Jae-wook is able to win his retrial due to a recording he obtained of Jong-gil admitting he had possession of the inhaler. Afterwards, we see that when Jae-wook is released from prison, Chi-won greets him with a bag of tofu, suggesting that they work together on a new item. The film ends with Jae-wook telling Chi-won to live honestly, citing John 16:33 from the bible, and smacking Chi-won on the back of his head.

== Cast ==
- Hwang Jung-min as Byun Jae-wook
- Gang Dong-won as Chi-won
- Lee Sung-min as Assistant Prosecutor General Jong-gil
- Park Sung-woong as Yang Min-woo
- Kim Byeong-ok as President Park
- Han Chae-young as Jang Hyun-seok
- Kim Ung-su as Kang Young-sik, the Congressman
- Shin So-yul as Kim Ha-na
- Park Ji-hwan as Cheol Goo
- Park Hoon as Cheol Goo's subordinate
- Cha Bo-sung as a protester.
- Shin Hye-sun as Yoon-ah, an electoral district bookkeeper

== Reception ==
The film grossed US$22 million in the first four days of release at the South Korean box office. A Violent Prosecutor is the 2nd highest-grossing South Korean film of 2016, with a US$66.6 million worldwide gross.

== Awards and nominations ==
Year	Award	Category	Recipient	Result
2016	37th Blue Dragon Film Awards	Best New Director	Lee Il-hyung	Nominated
2016	53rd Grand Bell Awards	Best Director	Lee Il-hyung	Nominated
2016	53rd Grand Bell Awards	Best New Director	Lee Il-hyung	Nominated

== See also ==
- A Prophet
- The Shawshank Redemption
