= List of awards and nominations received by Kim Yoon-seok =

Kim Yoon-seok awards and nominations
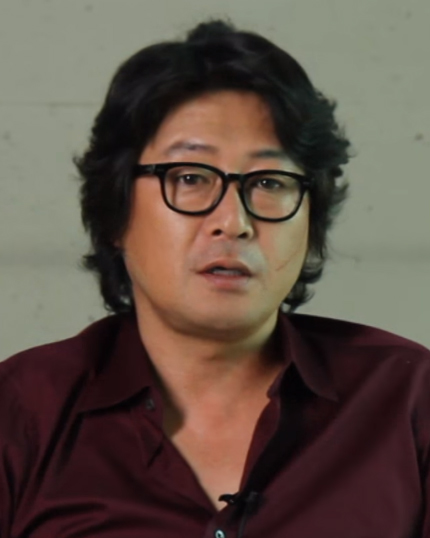
- Kim in 2014
Awards and nominations
Award	Wins	Nominations
Asia Pacific Screen Awards	0	1
Asian Film Awards	0	1
Asian Film Critics Association Awards	0	1
Baeksang Arts Awards	1	8
Bechdel Day	1	1
Blue Dragon Film Awards	2	8
Buil Film Awards	1	7
Cine21 Film Awards	2	2
Chunsa Film Art Awards	1	3
Fantasia International Film Festival	1	2
Grand Bell Awards	1	7
Golden Cinematography Awards	1	1
Hawaii International Film Festival	1	1
KmDB Choice Awards	1	1
KOFRA Film Awards	1	1
Korea Best Star Awards	1	1
Korean Culture and Entertainment Awards	1	1
Korean Popular Culture and Arts Awards	1	1
Korean Film Awards	1	1
Korea Movie Star Awards	1	1
Korea World Youth Film Festival	1	1
London Asian Film Festival	1	1
MBC Drama Awards	1	1
New York Asian Film Festival	1	1
University Film Festival of Korea	1	1

Totals (Note: Certain award groups do not simply award one winner. They acknowledge several different recipients, have runners-up, and have third place. Since this is a specific recognition and is different from losing an award, runner-up mentions are considered wins in this award tally. For simplification and to avoid errors, each award in this list has been presumed to have had a prior nomination.)
- Wins: 29
- Nominations: 59

South Korean actor Kim Yoon-seok (Korean: 김윤석) has been recognized with numerous awards and nominations in film and television. He has won a daesang (grand prize) from Korean Culture and Entertainment Awards.

Kim established himself as a leading man with his breakout performance in the 2008 thriller The Chaser, a role that swept the industry by winning Best Actor at the Blue Dragon Film Awards, Grand Bell Awards, Buil Film Awards, Busan Film Critics Awards, Chunsa Film Art Awards, and the Korean Film Awards, alongside a nomination at the Baeksang Arts Awards.

His critical success within South Korea's major ceremonies continued with a Best Supporting Actor win at the 2007 Grand Bell Awards for Tazza: The High Rollers and a Best Actor win at the 2018 Blue Dragon Film Awards for 1987: When the Day Comes, a performance that also earned him the Best Actor trophy at the 2018 Baeksang Arts Awards.

Over the years, Kim has secured numerous Baeksang, Blue Dragon, and Grand Bell nominations for his roles in prominent films such as Running Turtle, The Yellow Sea, Punch, The Fortress, Escape from Mogadishu, and Noryang: Deadly Sea.

Transitioning into filmmaking with his 2019 directorial debut Another Child, he expanded his accolades to include Best New Director nominations at both the Blue Dragon and Grand Bell Awards, a Bechdelian Writer Award, and international recognition with a Special Mention at the Fantasia International Film Festival and the NETPAC Award at the Hawaii International Film Festival.

== Awards and nominations ==
Name of the award ceremony, year presented, category, nominee of the award, and the result of the nomination
Award ceremony	Year	Category	Nominee / Work	Result	Ref.
Asia Pacific Screen Awards	2008	Best Actor	The Chaser	Nominated	
Asian Film Awards	2018	Best Actor	1987: When the Day Comes	Nominated	
Asian Film Critics Association Awards	2007	Best Supporting Actor	Tazza: The High Rollers	Nominated	
Baeksang Arts Awards	2008	Best Actor – Film	The Chaser	Nominated	
Baeksang Arts Awards	2010	Best Actor – Film	Running Turtle	Nominated	
Baeksang Arts Awards	2012	Best Actor – Film	Punch	Nominated	
Baeksang Arts Awards	2018	Grand Prize (Daesang)	The Fortress	Nominated	
Baeksang Arts Awards	2018	Grand Prize (Daesang)	1987: When the Day Comes	Nominated	
Baeksang Arts Awards	2018	Best Actor – Film	1987: When the Day Comes	Won	
Baeksang Arts Awards	2022	Best Actor – Film	Escape from Mogadishu	Nominated	
Baeksang Arts Awards	2024	Best Actor – Film	Noryang: Deadly Sea	Nominated	
Bechdel Day	2020	Bechdelian Writer Award	Another Child	Won	
Blue Dragon Film Awards	2006	Best Supporting Actor	Tazza: The High Rollers	Nominated	
Blue Dragon Film Awards	2008	Best Actor	The Chaser	Won	
Blue Dragon Film Awards	2009	Best Actor	Running Turtle	Nominated	
Blue Dragon Film Awards	2011	Best Actor	The Yellow Sea	Nominated	
Blue Dragon Film Awards	2012	Best Actor	Punch	Nominated	
Blue Dragon Film Awards	2017	Best Actor	The Fortress	Nominated	
Blue Dragon Film Awards	2018	Best Actor	1987: When the Day Comes	Won	
Blue Dragon Film Awards	2019	Best New Director	Another Child	Nominated	
Blue Dragon Film Awards	2021	Best Actor	Escape from Mogadishu	Nominated	
Buil Film Awards	2008	Best Actor	The Chaser	Won	
Buil Film Awards	2009	Best Actor	Running Turtle	Nominated	
Buil Film Awards	2011	Best Actor	The Yellow Sea	Nominated	
Buil Film Awards	2012	Best Actor	Punch	Nominated	
Buil Film Awards	2015	Best Actor	The Classified File	Nominated	
Buil Film Awards	2018	Best Actor	1987: When the Day Comes	Nominated	
Buil Film Awards	2021	Best Actor	Escape from Mogadishu	Nominated	
Busan Film Critics Awards	2007	Best Supporting Actor	Tazza: The High Rollers	Won	
Busan Film Critics Awards	2008	Best Actor	The Chaser	Won	
Chunsa Film Art Awards	2008	Best Actor	The Chaser	Won	
Chunsa Film Art Awards	2008	Popularity Award	The Chaser	Won	
Chunsa Film Art Awards	2018	Best Actor	1987: When the Day Comes	Nominated	
Chunsa Film Art Awards	2022	Best Actor	Escape from Mogadishu	Nominated	
Cine21 Film Awards	2011	Best Actor	The Yellow Sea	Won	
Cine21 Film Awards	2018	Best Actor	1987: When the Day Comes	Won	
Fantasia International Film Festival	2019	Best Film	Another Child	Nominated	
Fantasia International Film Festival	2019	Special Mention	Another Child	Won	
Golden Cinematography Awards	2018	Best Actor	1987: When the Day Comes	Won	
Grand Bell Awards	2007	Best Supporting Actor	Tazza: The High Rollers	Won	
Grand Bell Awards	2008	Best Actor	The Chaser	Won	
Grand Bell Awards	2008	Most Popular Actor	The Chaser	Won	
Grand Bell Awards	2009	Best Actor	Running Turtle	Nominated	
Grand Bell Awards	2011	Best Actor	The Yellow Sea	Nominated	
Grand Bell Awards	2018	Best Actor	1987: When the Day Comes	Nominated	
Grand Bell Awards	2020	Best New Director	Another Child	Nominated	
Hawaii International Film Festival	2019	NETPAC Award for an Emerging Asian filmmaker	Another Child	Won	
Kmdb Choice Awards	2009	Best Actor	Running Turtle	Won	
KOFRA Film Awards	2012	Best Actor	Punch	Won	
Korea Best Star Awards	2018	Best Actor	Dark Figure of Crime	Won	
Korean Culture and Entertainment Awards	2012	Grand Prize (Daesang)	The Thieves	Won	
Korean Film Awards	2008	Best Actor	The Chaser	Won	
Korea Movie Star Awards	2007	Best Supporting Actor	Tazza: The High Rollers	Won	
Korea World Youth Film Festival	2012	Favorite Actor	The Thieves	Won	
London Asian Film Festival	2018	Best Actor	Dark Figure of Crime	Won	
MBC Drama Awards	2006	Excellence Award, Actor	Love Me When You Can	Won	
New York Asian Film Festival	2018	Star Asia Award	1987: When the Day Comes	Won	
University Film Festival of Korea	2008	Best Actor	The Chaser	Won	

== State honors ==
Name of country, year given, and name of honor
Country	Award Ceremony	Year	Honor or Award	Ref.
South Korea	Korean Popular Culture and Arts Awards (Note: Honors are given at the Korean Popular Culture and Arts Awards, arranged by the Korea Creative Content Agency and hosted by the Ministry of Culture, Sports and Tourism. They are awarded to those who have contributed to the arts and South Korea's pop culture.)	2022	Prime Minister's Commendation	

== Listicles ==
Name of publisher, year listed, name of listicle, and placement
Publisher	Year	Listicle	Placement	Ref.
Korean Film Council	2021	Korean Actors 200 (Note: Introduces 200 actors that best represent the present and future of Korean cinema to the people in the film industry all over the world.)	Included	
