= June Democratic Struggle =

1987 South Korean pro-democracy movement

- Part of the Minjung movement
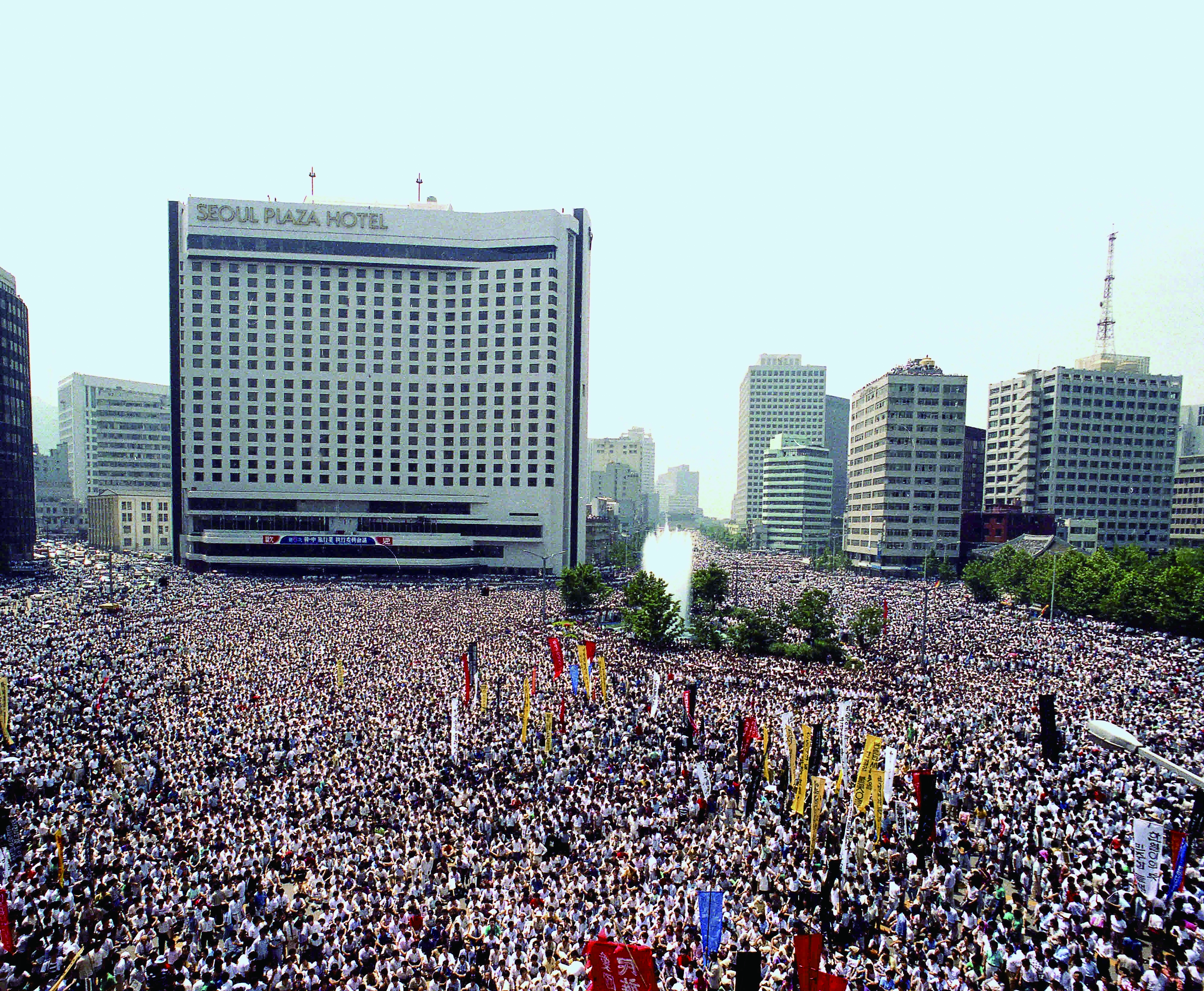
- Crowds gather at the state funeral of Lee Han-yeol in Downtown Seoul, 9 July 1987
- Date: 10–29 June 1987 (large-scale outbreak); January – 9 July 1987 (total)
- Location: South Korea
- Caused by: Authoritarianism; Proposed succession of Roh Tae-woo; Deaths of Park Jong-chul and Lee Han-yeol
- Goals: Democratization; Freedom of the press; Freedom of speech; Freedom of association; Abolition of the 1980 constitution
- Methods: Protest marches; Civil disobedience
- Result: June 29 Declaration; Stronger civil liberties in South Korea; Democratic elections; End of the Fifth Republic and formation of the Sixth Republic

Parties
(South Korea) Protestors Supported by: National Coalition for a Democratic Constitution; Federation of People's Movements for Democratic Reunification; Catholic Priests Association for Justice; Reunification Democratic Party; New Korean Democratic Party; Labor groups; Student groups	Government of South Korea: National Security Headquarters; Republic of Korea Army (initial, quickly rescinded); Supported by: Democratic Justice Party

Lead figures
Decentralized leadership	Chun Doo-hwan; Roh Tae-woo

Number
4 – 5 million protestors	89,000 police 100,000 soldiers

Casualties
- Deaths: 3

- June Democratic Struggle
- Hangul: 6월 민주 항쟁
- Hanja: 六月民主抗爭
- RR: 6wol minju hangjaeng
- MR: 6wŏl minju hangjaeng

The June Democratic Struggle (Korean: 6월 민주 항쟁), also known as the June Democracy Movement and the June Uprising, was a nationwide pro-democracy movement in South Korea that generated mass protests from 10 to 29 June 1987. The demonstrations forced the ruling authoritarian government to hold direct presidential elections and institute other democratic reforms, which led to the establishment of the Sixth Republic, the present-day government of the Republic of Korea (South Korea).

On 10 June, the military regime under president Chun Doo-hwan announced the selection of his close friend and ally Roh Tae-woo as the next president. The public designation of Chun's successor was widely seen as a final affront to the long-delayed process of revising the South Korean constitution to allow direct elections of the president. Although pressure on the regime from demonstrations by students and other groups had been mounting for some time, the announcement ultimately sparked massive and effective protests.

Chun and Roh were unwilling to use violence as the 1988 Olympic Games in Seoul were approaching. They believed that doing so would draw further criticism, with the regime already under international pressure after the Gwangju Uprising and its massacre a few years earlier. They also thought Roh could win a fair election since the opposition was divided. For these reasons, they accepted the protesters' main demands, allowing direct presidential elections and the introduction of civil liberties. Although Roh was duly elected president in a relatively free election that December with a narrow plurality of just 36 percent of the vote, the consolidation of a liberal democracy in South Korea continued through the 1990s.

== Background ==
=== Indirect presidential elections ===
Since the 1972 implementation of the Yushin Constitution by then-president Park Chung-hee, South Korean presidents were elected indirectly by the National Conference for Unification, an electoral college. This system persisted even after Park was assassinated in October 1979, and then replaced as president by Choi Kyu-hah, who was himself replaced within several months by Chun after the Coup d'état of December Twelfth in 1979. Since the college was generally hand picked by the regime itself, it did not represent any sort of democratic check on presidential power.

Seeking to enhance his domestic and international standing by providing a veneer of democratic representation, President Chun held parliamentary elections in 1985. Even though the ruling party lost only two mandates, the result was a major moral victory for the opposition, led by future presidents Kim Dae-jung and Kim Young-sam. The opposition's key demand was reinstating direct presidential elections, and Chun sought to foil this by initiating a campaign of delay, deliberation, and deferment. In response to another wave of public protest in February 1986, Chun agreed to allow parliamentary debate on constitutional change. Although a parliamentary committee debated various proposals for months, on April 13, 1987, Chun suspended even this committee until after the Olympics scheduled to be held around Seoul, citing a need for "national unity" ahead of the Games. This action intensified unrest and broader anti-government sentiment, especially as residents of many areas of Seoul such as Mok-dong were displaced to make way for planned facilities, but Chun continued his program to install Roh as his successor. Meanwhile, anti-government sentiment was growing among the public; a May 1987 survey of the "middle class" published in Hankook Ilbo found that 85.7% of respondents felt that it was "more desirable to protect human rights even at the cost of economic growth".

Throughout this period, the labor movement, university students, and churches in particular formed a mutually supporting alliance that put increasing pressure on the regime. This mobilized a large portion of civil society, in addition to the "official" political opposition, forming the core of the resistance that would become widespread during the decisive events of June.

=== Student movement and death of Park Jong-chul ===
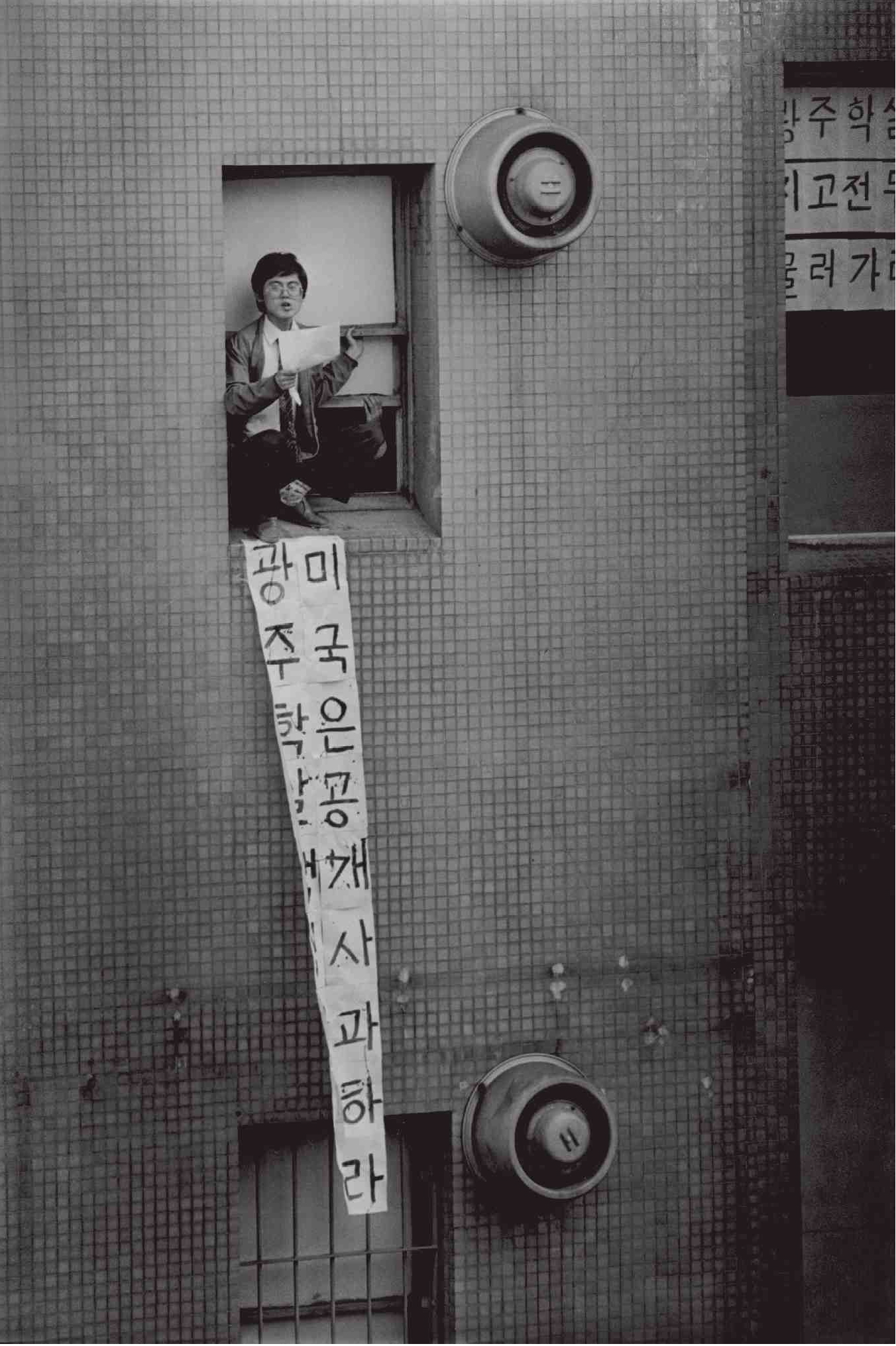
Students occupy the Seoul US Cultural Center on May 23, 1985.

In the 1980s, many student activists in universities struggled against Chun Doo-hwan's dictatorship in the aftermath of the remembered May 18, 1980 Gwangju Uprising. Student radicalism had become particularly widespread in the years leading up to 1987, with 469,000 students participating in protests in the year 1985. On May 23, 1985, students occupied the United States Information Service (USIS) cultural center in Seoul, demanding an apology for alleged U.S. complicity in the actions of the South Korean government in Gwangju, as well as an end to support for the Chun government. The affair and subsequent trial led to significant media publicity throughout the country, as well as attempted copycat actions. On May 3, 1986, student demonstrations in Incheon targeted offices of both the ruling Democratic Justice Party as well as the officially-recognized opposition New Korean Democratic Party, amidst tensions over the latter's stance of compromise towards the government, including denunciation of the student movement.

On January 13, 1987, activist Park Jong-chul (1965–1987), the president of the student council in the linguistics department of the Seoul National University, was detained by police. While under interrogation, Park refused to confess the whereabouts of one of his fellow activists. During the interrogation, authorities used waterboarding techniques to torture him, leading to his death through asphyxiation on January 14. On February 7, protest marches held in his memory saw clashes with police across the country. On March 3, the 49th day after Park's death and the time for his reincarnation according to Buddhist tradition, Buddhist groups collaborated with the opposition and allowed the Jogyesa Temple in Seoul to be used as a base for nationwide gatherings.

Information surrounding the events of Park's death was initially suppressed. However, the Catholic Priests Association for Justice (CPAJ), revealed details, including that of a deliberate cover-up by authorities, to the public at a May 18 memorial service for the victims of the Gwangju Uprising, further inflaming public sentiment. On May 23, a meeting of opposition groups was held, during which they announced plans for mass demonstrations on June 10. This coalition took the name of the National Coalition for a Democratic Constitution (NCDC; 민주헌법쟁취국민운동본부; 民主憲法爭取國民運動本部), or Guk-bon.

=== Death of Lee Han-yeol ===
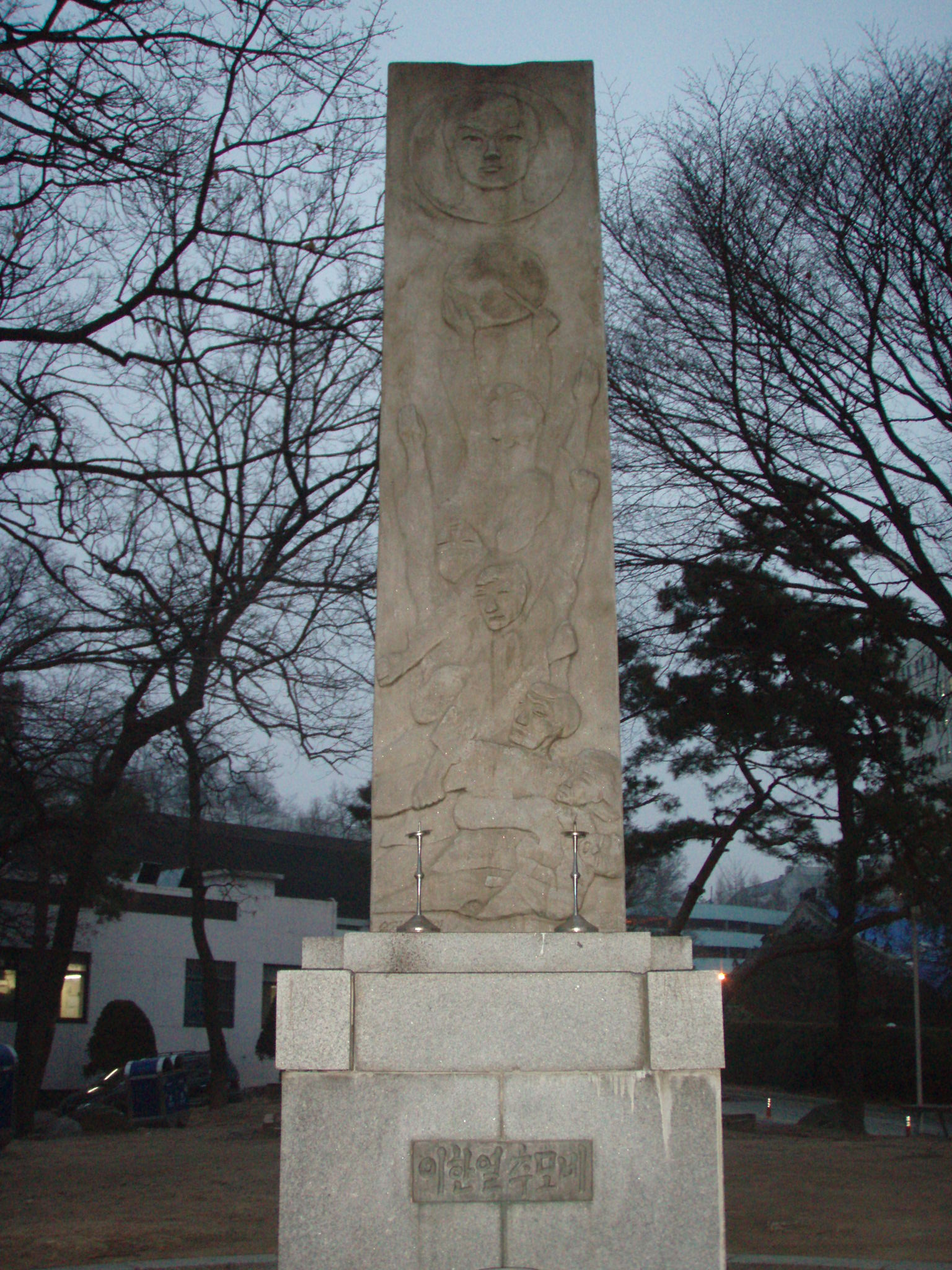
Lee Han-yeol Memorial

On June 9, student groups nationwide took to the field and mobilized on campuses across the country, in preparation for the planned mass protests on June 10. At 2 p.m., Yonsei University student Lee Han-yeol was seriously injured when a tear gas grenade penetrated his skull. A widely circulated photograph was captured of him injured and being carried away by a fellow student. In critical condition, he quickly became a symbol of the subsequent protests over the weeks that followed.

He eventually died of his wounds on July 5, after the regime had agreed to the people's demands. Over 1.6 million citizens participated in his national funeral, held on July 9. He was buried at May 18th National Cemetery.

== Main demonstrations ==
The 1980 South Korean constitution limited the president to a single seven-year term. Although extension to the term via constitutional amendment was possible, this would legally not apply to the sitting president, effectively excluding Chun from serving past 1987. However, the constitution still granted significant power to the presidential office, and political activity faced continued suppression.

Roh Tae-woo's nomination as Chun's successor was scheduled for June 10, the same day as scheduled protests. As the day approached, authorities took measures to clamp down on dissent. Korea University student leader Lee In-young was arrested on June 2. On June 8, the government's Ministries of Internal Affairs and Justice pre-emptively declared the planned protest actions as illegal assemblies, and the Guk-bon as a "subversive organization". Nearly 5,000 dissidents were arrested during overnight raids, and 700 opposition leaders were placed under house arrest. The Democratic Justice Party convention where Roh's nomination as successor president took place opened at 6 p.m. on June 10 at the Jamsil Arena in Seoul. As students reached the nearby Seoul City Hall, police immediately began to attack. Despite police efforts, the National Rally Against the Cover-Up and Torture Death of Park Jong-chul and to Repeal the Constitution (박종철군 고문치사 조작, 은폐 규탄 및 호헌철폐 국민대회) was successfully held in 18 cities across the country. Violent clashes broke out between police and demonstrators throughout the national capital city of Seoul. Many motorists expressed their opposition to the government by honking their vehicle's horns en masse. A soccer match between South Korea and Egypt was cancelled after vast quantities of police tear gas covered the field. A total of 3,831 people were reportedly arrested.

That evening, students in Seoul fled police by entering the Myeongdong Cathedral operated by the Roman Catholic Archdiocese of Seoul, which had become a major centre for religious opposition to the government and presidential dictatorship. After being unable to leave due to police blockades, they began a sit-in inside the building. Cardinal Kim Su-hwan, the Archbishop of Seoul (1922–2009, served 1968–1998), announced that priests were ready to go to the front lines in order to prevent police from storming the building. The cathedral becoming a major focal point and public forum for the protestors, attracting large amounts of external support. On June 11, the National Police Agency defended its actions on the previous day, describing rallies as illegal, and as violent "disorderly conduct", and declaring their intention to crack down on further unrest. The same day, a thousand students attempted to enter the cathedral in order to join the occupation, but were blocked by riot police, who arrested at least 301 people. While the sit-in was underway, protests continued to grow for the next several days, seeing increased involvement from members of the general public despite the lack of officially planned mobilizations from the Guk-bon for days following June 10. Between June 11 and 15, an estimated forty to fifty students required hospitalization in Seoul daily due to injuries from police violence. The sit-in ended on June 15, after the government announced they would not punish the occupiers provided they left the premises on that day. Successfully leaving the building without arrest, the occupation was seen as a victory and emboldened the movement. On the same day as the end of the sit-in, an estimated 60,000 students protested at 45 colleges across the country.

Protests from June 10 onwards differed from protests earlier in the year due to the degree of mass participation; whereas early protests were driven by opposition groups and students, the June protests saw increased involvement from other sectors of the populace, comprising all social standings. White-collar workers threw rolls of toilet paper from offices, applauding and otherwise voicing their support. Office workers who joined the protest were dubbed the "necktie brigade" because of their work uniforms. Protests also spread to cities that had previously seen little public dissent, such as Daejeon.

On June 18, the National Rally for the Abolition of Tear Gas Grenades (Korean: 최루탄추방국민대회; Hanja: 催淚彈追放國民大會) brought 1.5 million people into the streets. Writing for the New York Times, Clyde Haberman described police as having "[lost] control of the streets" on this day. In Busan, the city center around Seomyeon Roundabout was filled with 300,000 demonstrators, forcing police to give up firing tear gas. Associated rallies were held in 247 locations in 16 cities nationwide. That night, a protestor, Lee Tae-chun, was fatally wounded in Busan after falling from an overpass due to police releasing tear gas onto the structure. While his death was ruled to be caused solely via falling, an autopsy revealed a skull fracture that implied the impact of a tear gas grenade. One policeman was killed in Daejon after being hit by a commandeered bus. On June 19, Acting Prime Minister Lee Han-key threatened "extraordinary measures" in a televised address if protests did not cease. On the same day, Chun issued orders to mobilize the army, but fearing a reprise of the violent Gwangju Massacre, he rescinded them within hours.

On June 20, a contingent of around 150 protesting Buddhist monks were confronted by riot police in Seoul; when dispersed, they were joined by thousands of civilians. On June 21, forty Guk-bon leaders proposed a list of four demands to the government. They requested a cancellation of the April 13 measure suspending constitutional reform, a release of all prisoners of conscience, a guarantee to rights of freedom of assembly, demonstration, and the press, and an end to police use of tear gas. A further day of nationwide protests was to be held if these demands were not met by June 26. As the government refused to compromise, the Great National March of Peace (Korean: 국민평화대행진; Hanja: 國民平和大行進) was held; over 1 million people participated in cities across South Korea, more than the triple the number of those who had participated in protests on June 10. 100,000 riot police were deployed nationwide to block rally points, but these were insufficient to prevent protests. Gwangju saw its largest demonstrations since the 1980 Uprising, and civilians outnumbered police to such an extent that they were able to successfully perform peaceful assemblies in Suwon, Mokpo and Yeosu. On this day, over 3,469 arrests were reported nationwide.

Eventually, Roh Tae-woo issued the June 29 Declaration, capitulating to the demands of the protesters by promising to amend the Constitution and to release political prisoners, including opposition leader Kim Dae-jung, who had been under house arrest since his return from exile in 1985. The declaration was officially approved by President Chun two days later.

== Aftermath ==
=== 1987 Great Labor Struggle ===
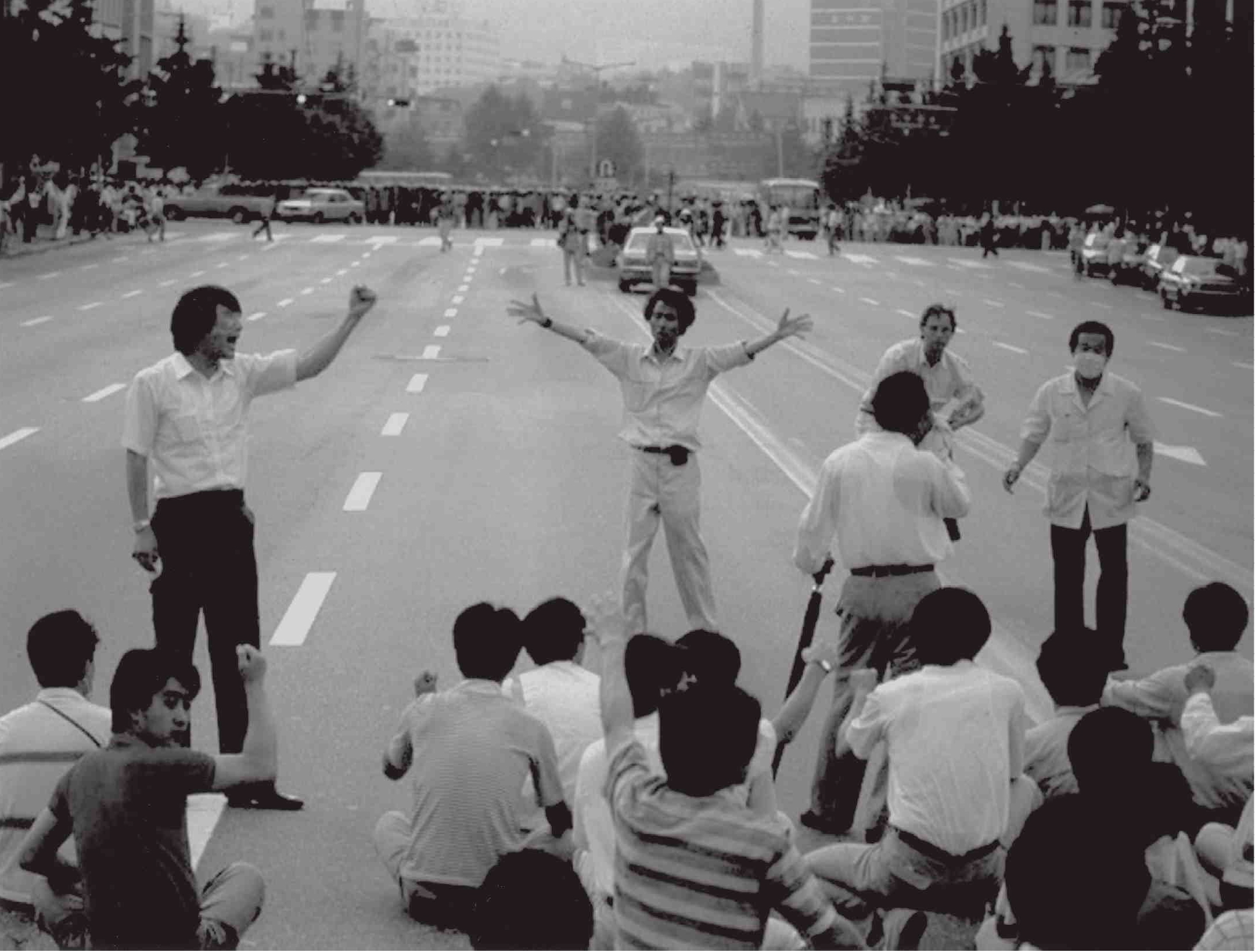
Protests in Seoul

Prior to 1987, labor movements in South Korea had long played a major role in opposition movements against the country's military dictatorships. The role they played during June 1987 further emboldened them and allowed them to consolidate their position. Following the June Democratic Uprising, Hyundai Engine Trade Union was established in Ulsan on July 5. Many workers across the country started to establish labor unions and take actions to demand better conditions, such as strikes and walkouts. Within the space of a year, 4,000 new unions representing some 700,000 workers were established, and union membership would increase from 1.06 million in 1986 to 1.98 million in 1990. Daewoo worker Lee Suk-kyu was killed after being hit by a tear gas canister on August 22, and Hyundai workers occupied Ulsan City Hall on September 2. On September 29, the government announced it would take steps to make workers "middle class". A total of 3,492 labor disputes were recorded by the government between June 29 and September 15, with an average of 44 industrial actions being undertaken per day in this period.

=== Constitutional reform ===
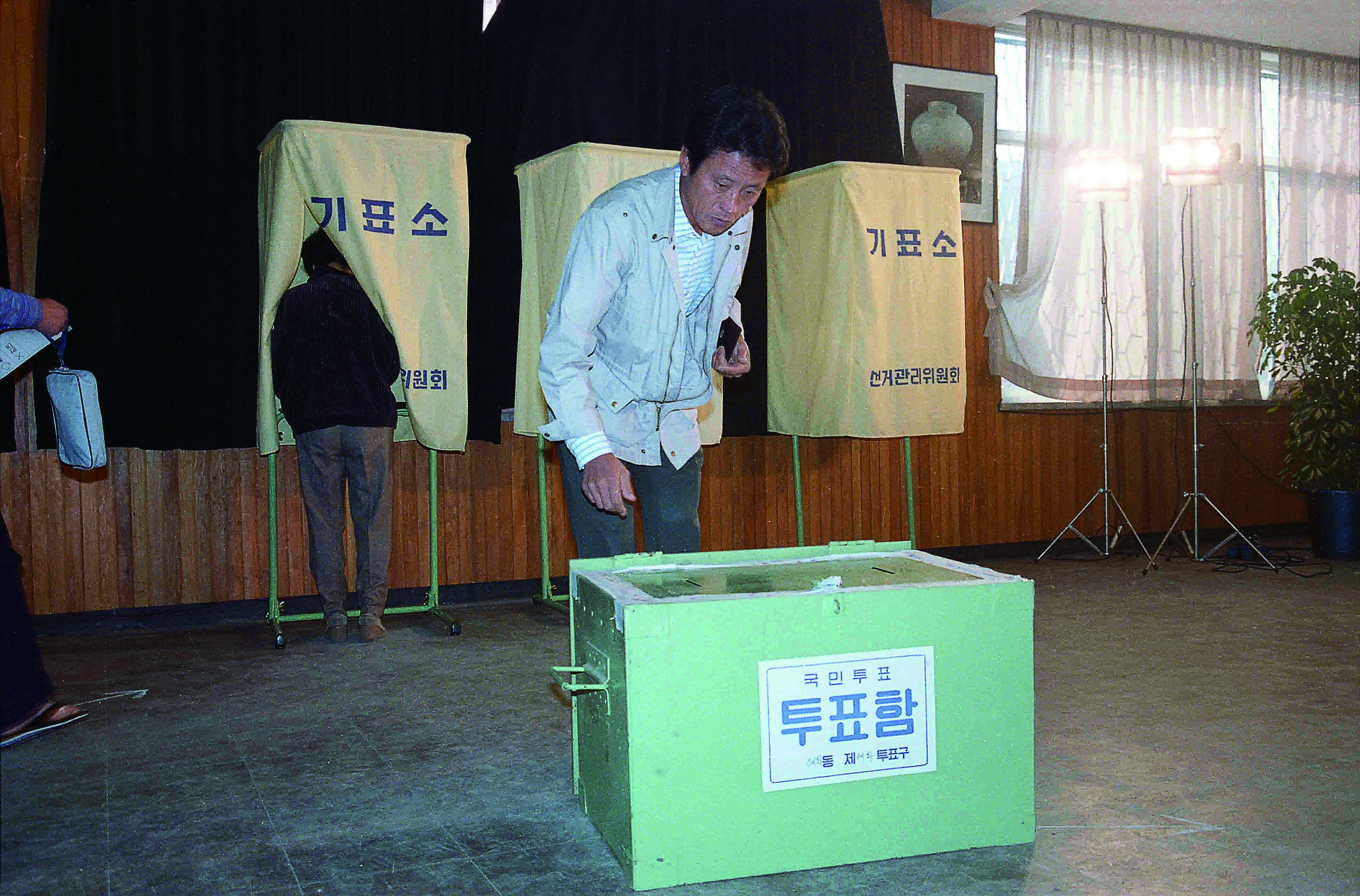
Man voting in the constitutional referendum

After the June 29 Declaration, the process of constitutional amendment began in earnest. On October 12 the constitutional bill was passed, and it was approved via a public referendum held on October 28, with 94.4% of voters in favor. It officially took effect on February 25, 1988, when Roh Tae-woo was inaugurated as president.

The 10th Constitution strengthened civil rights. Natural and legal rights were explicitly specified, direct presidential elections were implemented, and the power of the president was reduced in favor of the power of National Assembly of Korea.

=== Democratic elections ===
Roh retained his June 10 nomination as the presidential candidate of the presidency of Democratic Justice Party. Roh had enough legitimate support within the Korean electorate to compete in the elections in December 1987. His position was greatly improved by the divisions within the opposition, as Kim Dae-jung and Kim Young-sam were unable to unite, or even back a two-round voting system that would create a runoff.

Two weeks before the presidential election, Korean Air Flight 858 flying between Baghdad, Iraq to Seoul, exploded in November 1987, when it was flying to Bangkok, Thailand. The revelation of the North Korean conspiracy against the plane, and the arrival in Seoul of Kim Hyon-hui (born 1962), one of the agents responsible for the attack, the day before the election created a profitable environment for Roh Tae-woo. Declassified documents have since confirmed that Chun's government deliberately sought to exploit the events for political gain, including by ensuring that Kim was extradited before the election.

The election finally took place on December 16. Roh Tae-woo was elected president, receiving 36.6% of the vote, with a turnout of 89.2%. The opposition vote was split between Kim Young-sam, who received 28%, and Kim Dae-jung, who received 27%. This election marked the beginning of the Sixth Republic.

== In popular culture ==
A segment of the 1999 film Peppermint Candy, spanning 20 years of recent South Korean history, is set during the events of 1987, while the protagonist is working as a policeman.

In 2009, Choi Kyu-sok published 100 °C, a graphic novel based on the events of the June Uprising. An English translation was released by University of Hawaiʻi Press in Honolulu in 2023.

The 2017 film 1987: When the Day Comes, directed by Jang Joon-hwan, depicts how the death of Park Jong-chul sparked a chain of events leading to the mass uprising in June 1987.

The 2021 K-drama television series Snowdrop, broadcast on South Korean television network JTBC, depicts a fictional story set in the wake of the June Struggle in the 1980s. The series caused major controversy, including the withdrawal of sponsors and calls for the show's cancellation. It was accused of historical negationism due to the male protagonist's status as a communist North Korean agent posing as a student activist, which echoed accusations levelled by the Chun government against the opposition movement. It was also accused of glorifying the actions of the Agency for National Security Planning.

== See also ==
- 2016–2017 South Korean protests
- 8888 Uprising
- April Revolution
- Bu-Ma Democratic Protests
- Gwangju Uprising
- Indonesian riots of 1998
- Non-cooperation movement (2024)
- People Power Revolution
- Seoul Spring
- Tiananmen Square protests of 1989
- Wild Lily student movement
