= Save the Green Planet! =

2003 South Korean film by Jang Jun-hwan

- Theatrical release poster
- Hangul: 지구를 지켜라!
- Hanja: 地球를 지켜라!
- RR: Jigureul jikyeora!
- MR: Chigurŭl chik'yŏra!
- Directed by: Jang Joon-hwan
- Written by: Jang Joon-hwan
- Produced by: Seoung Jae-cha; Kim Seon-a
- Starring: Shin Ha-kyun; Baek Yoon-sik
- Cinematography: Hong Kyung-pyo
- Edited by: Park Gok-ji
- Music by: Lee Dong-jun
- Distributed by: CJ Entertainment
- Release date: April 4, 2003
- Running time: 118 minutes
- Country: South Korea
- Language: Korean
- Budget: $3 million
- Box office: $15,516 (U.S)

Save the Green Planet! (Korean: 지구를 지켜라!; RR: Jigureul jikyeora!) is a 2003 South Korean science fiction black comedy film written and directed by Jang Joon-hwan. The plot follows a young man, Lee Byeong-gu, as he kidnaps Kang Man-shik, an executive of a major pharmaceutical corporation, who Byeong-gu believes to be an alien.

The film was released on 4 April 2003. An English-language remake, Bugonia, was released in the United States on October 24, 2025. Jang was set to direct, but was replaced by the Greek filmmaker Yorgos Lanthimos due to health concerns. He was credited as executive producer.

== Plot ==
Lee Byeong-gu, a conspiracy theorist obsessed with aliens, believes that extraterrestrials from "Andromeda PK 45" are preparing to invade Earth and that he must prevent their plot. With the help of Sunny, his childlike circus performer girlfriend, he kidnaps Kang Man-shik, a pharmaceutical executive who he believes to be an alien commander who can contact the Andromedan prince during a lunar eclipse due soon.

Byeong-gu imprisons Kang in his basement and shaves his head to prevent him from sending a telepathic distress signal to the Andromedans. Kang is subjected to various tests which include scrubbing him with a Korean liquid painkiller and an “Italy towel” used by ttaemiris. It is revealed that Kang's company poisoned Byeong-gu's mother during a drug trial, linking Byeong-gu's paranoia to personal tragedy. When a detective arrives to investigate Kang's disappearance, Byeong-gu hides the evidence, but the officer later discovers human remains. He attempts to summon police backup, but is found and killed by Byeong-gu. Byeong-gu crucifies Kang and breaks his leg after he attempts to escape.

Kang convinces him that a bottle of benzene in his car is an antidote for his comatose mother. Byeong-gu takes it to her and makes her drink it, killing her. Meanwhile, Kang frees himself and uncovers Byeong-gu's bloodstained notebooks, jars of human organs, and photographs of victims. Reading through Byeong-gu's diaries, Kang learns of his brutal upbringing: an abusive father, violent school years, his mother's poisoning, family tensions, and his lover's death during a protest.

The detective's partner locates the hideout before Byeong-gu returns. He captures both men, prompting Kang to claim that he is truly an alien. He says that the Andromedan race once tried to save humanity by altering human DNA. He promises to contact the alien prince at his industrial complex.

At the industrial complex, Kang activates a robotic arm that kills Sunny and overpowers Byeong-gu. The police arrive and shoot Byeong-gu, who dies wondering who will save the Earth in his stead, and Kang is abducted by a UFO after his arrest attempt. The Andromedans appear and retrieve Kang, their king. Disillusioned by humanity, he declares Earth a failed experiment and obliterates it.

== Cast ==
- Shin Ha-kyun as Lee Byeong-gu
- Baek Yoon-sik as Kang Man-shik
- Hwang Jeong-min as Sunny
- Lee Jae-yong as Detective Choo
- Lee Ju-hyeon as Detective Kim
- Gi Ju-bong as Squad Leader Lee
- Ye Soo-jung as Byeong-gu's mother

== Production ==
Jang conceived Save the Green Planet! while watching the 1990 film Misery. He enjoyed it, but was disappointed with the lack of depth of the Annie Wilkes character, and accordingly decided that if he made a film about a kidnapping, it would be staged from the point of view of the kidnapper. Later, Jang stumbled across a crank website accusing the actor Leonardo DiCaprio of being an alien who wanted to conquer Earth by seducing its women, and combined the two concepts. Jang said the production cost around $3 million.

== Reception ==
On the review aggregator website Rotten Tomatoes, 88% of 43 critics' reviews are positive. The website's consensus reads: "A funny and wildly inventive hybrid of various genres, Save the Green Planet! is definitely a unique viewing experience." Metacritic, which uses a weighted average, assigned the film a score of 70 out of 100, based on 14 critics, indicating "generally favorable" reviews.

== Remake ==
In May 2020, it was announced that CJ Entertainment would be producing an English-language remake of the cult film with film-making duo Ari Aster and Lars Knudsen, whose credits include Midsommar and Hereditary. Jang was originally set to direct, but would later step down as director due to health problems, but remained attached as an executive producer. In February 2024, it was reported that Yorgos Lanthimos was set to direct the remake, with Aster producing alongside Ed Guiney and Andrew Lowe from Element Pictures. In May 2024, Focus Features acquired all rights outside South Korea to the project, which had since been retitled to Bugonia, starring Emma Stone and Jesse Plemons. In June that year, it was announced that the film would be aimed for a November 2025 release. In April 2025, the film was re-scheduled to be released in the United States on October 24, 2025. Jang stated that he was "delighted" and "relieved with Lanthimos's hiring.

== Awards and nominations ==
Awards and nominations
Award	Category	Recipient(s)	Result	Ref.
Blue Dragon Film Awards	Best Supporting Actor	Baek Yoon-sik	Won	
Blue Dragon Film Awards	Best New Director	Jang Joon-hwan	Won	
Brussels International Fantastic Film Festival	Golden Raven Award	Save the Green Planet!	Won	
Buenos Aires International Festival of Independent Cinema	Best Actress	Hwang Jeong-min	Won	
Buenos Aires International Festival of Independent Cinema	ADF Cinematography Award		Won	
Director's Cut Awards	Best New Director	Jang Joon-hwan	Won	
Grand Bell Awards	Best Film		Nominated	
Grand Bell Awards	Best Supporting Actor	Baek Yoon-sik	Won	
Grand Bell Awards	Best Screenplay	Jang Joon-hwan	Nominated	
Grand Bell Awards	Best Music	Lee Dong-june	Nominated	
Grand Bell Awards	Best Art Direction		Nominated	
Grand Bell Awards	Best Visual Effects		Nominated	
Grand Bell Awards	Best Sound		Won	
Grand Bell Awards	Best Costume Design		Nominated	
Grand Bell Awards	Best New Director	Jang Joon-hwan	Won	
Korean Film Awards	Best Supporting Actor	Baek Yoon-sik	Won	
Korean Film Awards	Best New Director	Jang Joon-hwan	Won	
25th Moscow International Film Festival	Golden Saint George	Save the Green Planet!	Nominated	
25th Moscow International Film Festival	Silver Saint George	Save the Green Planet!	Won	
Puchon International Fantastic Film Festival	Best of Puchon	Save the Green Planet!	Won	
Busan Film Critics Awards	Best Film	Save the Green Planet!	Won	
Busan Film Critics Awards	Best Actor	Shin Ha-kyun	Won	
Busan Film Critics Awards	Best New Director	Jang Joon-hwan	Won	
International Film Festival Rotterdam	KNF Award Special Mention	Save the Green Planet!	Won	
