= Kim Yoon-seok =

South Korean actor (born 1968)

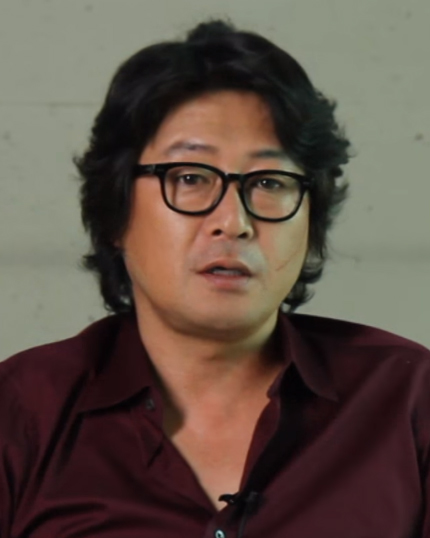
- Kim in 2014
- Born: January 21, 1968 (age 58); Danyang County, North Chungcheong Province, South Korea
- Education: Dong-eui University - German Language & Literature
- Occupations: Actor; film director; screenwriter
- Years active: 1988–present
- Agent: HB Entertainment
- Spouse: Bang Joo-ran (m. 2002)
- Children: 2
- Awards: Full list

Korean name
- Hangul: 김윤석
- RR: Gim Yunseok
- MR: Kim Yunsŏk

Kim Yoon-seok (Korean: 김윤석; born January 21, 1968) is a South Korean actor, film director and screenwriter. Kim began his career in theater and it subsequently led him to be cast in minor roles in films and television dramas. His breakout role came as the villain in gambling film Tazza: The High Rollers (2006), but it was his performance as an ex-cop turned pimp in surprise hit The Chaser (2008) that brought him wider recognition.

Kim has since become an acclaimed actor in South Korea, with notable performances in films such as Running Turtle (2009), Jeon Woo-chi: The Taoist Wizard (2009), The Yellow Sea (2010), Punch (2011),The Thieves (2012), Hwayi: A Monster Boy (2013), The Classified File (2015), The Priests (2015), 1987: When the Day Comes (2017), Dark Figure of Crime (2018), and Escape from Mogadishu (2021).

In 2019, Kim made his directorial debut with Another Child, a family drama film starring Yum Jung-ah and Kim So-jin.

== Early life and education ==
Kim Yoon-seok was born on born January 21, 1968 in Danyang County, North Chungcheong Province, but his family moved to Busan shortly after his birth, where he lived for over 20 years. Influenced by his film-enthusiast parents, he developed a passion for cinema at an early age and spent much of his high school years frequenting movie theaters. He also showed an early talent for drawing.

After failing his 1985 entrance exam for the Department of Theater and Film at Hanyang University, Kim enrolled in the Department of German Language and Literature at Dong-eui University the following year. Due to frequent campus closures and class cancellations caused by the democratization movement, Kim initially considered military enlistment. However, after witnessing the university's theatrical arts club practicing outdoors, he joined the group, known as the Dramatic Arts Research Society, in 1986.

== Career ==
=== 1987–1992: Beginning in theater ===
Concurrently, the university's Dramatic Arts Research Association experienced a split, leading to the creation of the national theater research group "Yeongeuk Ai" (Theater Child). In 1987, after a one-year leave of absence, he served as the president of Yeongeuk Ai and made his directorial debut with Camus's work The Misunderstanding, which deals with existential issues. However, feeling disillusioned by what he perceived as the club's focus on abstract intellect and ideology over genuine engagement with reality, he left the group later that year to join the professional Theater Company Hyeonjang. During his tenure there, Kim studied stage production extensively while taking on various tasks.

To better understand the relationship between text and performance, Kim closely studied British, American, and post-war literature, developing a particular interest in the Theater of the Absurd. This interest led him to join the Budu Theater Company, which had been established in 1984 by fellow Theater of the Absurd enthusiast Lee Seong-gyu. Kim made his professional acting debut that same year in a production of A Streetcar Named Desire. In 1989, while still a student, he won the Arts Council Korea Director's Award in the lighting category at the National Stage Artists Competition, an event typically contested by professional staff from major cultural and civic centers.

=== 1993–1994: Early career in Seoul ===
For the 15th National University Student Drama Festival in 1992, Kim directed Apprentices (adapted from Lee Oe-su's work with a script by Lee Hyeon-dae), which won the grand prize. This achievement marked Dong-eui University's first time advancing past the regional preliminaries. The win earned Kim a spot on a month-long educational tour of European cities, including Moscow, Warsaw, Berlin, and Paris. His exposure to international youth theater during this trip significantly boosted his confidence to pursue acting professionally.

Kim Seok-man, the festival judge and CEO of the Yeonwoo Theater Company, (Note: Yeonwoo Stage (연우무대를), which means 'playing friend', started as a small group on February 5, 1977, and is Korea's representative theater company that has led the revitalization of creative plays in the Korean theater world. From the days of Sinchon to the present in Hyehwa-dong, Yeonwoo Stage has been working hard to realize the complete stage of novel creative works.) invited Kim to audition for the company's Rediscovery of Modern Theater Series 2. After passing, Kim joined Yeonwoo Stage in 1993 and relocated to Seoul. He made his Seoul debut in Lee Geun-sam's There is a Soup, directed by Park Won-geun, where he became close friends with co-star Song Kang-ho. Following Kim Seok-man's sudden resignation from the company, Kim left to freelance, resulting in a period of financial hardship.

During this period, Kim and Song frequently shared the stage, co-starring in productions such as Theater Company 76's Giselle (written by Brecht and directed by Ki Kuk-seo), Theater Company Sanulim's Women's Rebellion (written by Kim Gwang-rim and directed by Lee Seong-ryeol), and Hakjeon Theater Company's Diary of a Fat Sofa (written by Hwang Ji-woo and directed by Ju In-seok). Kim also appeared in Bicycle (directed by Kim Cheol-ri) at the inaugural Oh Tae-seok Theater Festival.

Among these early works, Giselle was a turning point for Kim. He later noted that the production's use of dance and ballet elements reflected contemporary social anxieties, comparing its thematic weight to director Ki Kuk-seo's acclaimed Hamlet series and Insulting the Audience. In 1994, Kim made his film debut with a minor role in feature film Young Lover.

=== 1995–1999: Returning to Busan ===
Skeptical of the career instability in Seoul, Kim returned to his hometown of Busan in March 1995. While there, he worked as a freelancer, assisting with stage decoration and event planning at a live jazz cafe run by an acquaintance. His major productions during this period included the Budu Theater Company's stagings of Waiting for Godot, The Birthday Party, Lolita, and The Odd Couple.

From 1995 to 1997, he served as the permanent director of "Lighting in the Classroom," a theater group for teachers. He took on this role because most of the members belonged to the Korean Teachers and Education Workers Union (KTU) and were actively engaged with the realities of the education system.

In November 1996, Kim founded the theater company Yeo, which focused on underground theater artists in their 30s. Its inaugural production, Ophelia (adapted from Shakespeare), was heavily influenced by veteran director Ki Kuk-seo. In the play, Kim reimagined Hamlet as an idealistic urban nihilist and Laertes as a pragmatically minded businessman. In 1997, he served as the assistant director for the Busan run of the rock musical Subway Line 1 at Taeyang Art Hall, a co-production between Hanbit Planning and Hakjeon Theater Company. The musical was directed by Hakjeon founder Kim Min-ki, who had previously co-founded Yeonwoo Stage, Kim's former theater company in Seoul.

When CEO Lee Seong-gyu of Budu Theater Company became the president of the Busan Theater Association in 1998, Kim served as the organization's secretary-general. However, about six months into the role, Kim grew anxious after watching his close friend, Song Kang-ho, rise to prominence in Seoul. With President Lee's permission, Kim left his position. In 1999, following an encouraging phone call from Song, Kim officially returned to Seoul to resume his career.

=== 2000–2007: Back to Seoul and film breakthrough ===
Upon returning to Seoul, Kim joined Hakjeon Theater Company under the mentorship of Kim Min-ki, performing in productions such as Subway Line 1 until 2003. Although Kim made his film debut in 1994, he spent a decade appearing primarily in minor roles. In 2004, he appeared in supporting roles in dramas such as Resurrection and Sisily 2km. That same year, He began gaining wider public recognition in 2004 when he was cast as a detective in Choi Dong-hoon's heist film The Big Swindle.

He transitioned to television in 2005, and achieved a career breakthrough in 2006. That year, he starred in the KBS2 drama Thank You, My Life alongside Yu Ho-jeong, won the Excellence Award at the MBC Drama Awards for Love Me When You Can, and earned critical praise for his supporting roles in the films Like a Virgin. Kim had his major breakthrough in Choi Dong-hoon's Tazza: The High Rollers, with audiences praising his performance in the supporting role as ruthless gambler Agwi (meaning "starving demon" in Buddhism).

=== 2008–2017: The Chaser and critical acclaim ===
A leading role followed in 2008 with The Chaser, directed by Na Hong-jin. He successfully portrayed the morally ambiguous character of a retired-cop-turned-pimp hunting down a serial killer who murdered the call girls due to his impotence. The thriller was a critical and commercial hit, which surpassed 5 million viewers. This role led to critical acclaim and earned him Best Supporting Actor at the Grand Bell Awards and the Busan Film Critics Awards. With total 8 awards, it made him a major player in the Korean film industry.

In the same year, he won the Excellence Award at the MBC Drama Awards for his role in Love Me When You Can. He transitioned from character actors in the industry into a popular leading actor: Kim played a middle-aged man following his lifelong dream to play in a rock band in The Happy Life, a rural detective trying to capture a legendary prison breaker in Running Turtle, and a rival Taoist wizard in Jeon Woo-chi.

In 2010, Kim reunited with The Chaser costar Ha Jung-woo in Na's sophomore film The Yellow Sea. Kim then costarred with Yoo Ah-in in coming-of-age film Punch, a critically and commercial hit.

Subsequently, he solidified his position as a major box office draw with hits including The Yellow Sea (2010), Punch (2011). Kim once again triumphed in 2012, as his heist movie The Thieves became the second best-selling Korean film of all time. He recorded a total of 34 million admissions over a five-year period, a unique record in Korean cinema at the time.

In 2013, he continued working with one of Korea's leading directors, in Yim Soon-rye's family drama film South Bound. He then starred in Hwayi: A Monster Boy, an action thriller directed by Jang Joon-hwan. In 2014, Kim starred in the critically acclaimed arthouse film Sea Fog directed by Shim Sung-bo.

In 2015, Kim collaborated with director Kwak Kyung-taek in The Classified File., playing a detective cooperating with a shaman to find out and save a kidnapped girl. Kim then reunited with Kang Dong-won in The Priests, a supernatural mystery thriller by director Jang Jae-hyun. The Priests was a box office hit, attracting 5.44 million admissions to cinema. Kim then made a brief appearance in retro film C'est Si Bon by Kim Hyun-seok, playing a middle-aged man retrospecting his youth in 1980s. In 2016, Kim starred in romance film Will You Be There?, directed by Hong Ji-young, based on the novel of the same name of Guillaume Musso. Kim portrayed a middle-aged pediatric whose last wish before death was to see his first love once again.

In 2017, Kim starred in director Hwang Dong-hyuk's historical film The Fortress. He also reunited with director Jang Joon-hwan in 1987: When the Day Comes, another historical political film about pro-democratic movement in South Korea in 1987.

=== 2018–present: Filmmaking and other roles ===
In 2018, Kim starred in murder mystery film Dark Figure of Crime. He reportedly worked on the script alongside director Kwak Kyung-taek. In 2019, Kim made his directorial debut with Another Child, a family drama film.

In 2021, Kim co-starred in Ryoo Seung-wan's action drama film Escape from Mogadishu, portraying the South Korean ambassador in a story based on real events during the Somali Civil War. The film became one of the year's most critically and commercially successful South Korean releases.

Kim signed with new agency Hodu&U Entertainment in October 2022. In 2023, he appeared in Noryang: Deadly Sea, the final installment of Kim Han-min's Yi Sun-sin trilogy, portraying the admiral in the film's depiction of the Battle of Noryang.

In 2024, Kim returned to television for the first time in 18 years with the mystery-thriller series The Frog. That same year, he also starred in the family drama film About Family. In 2025, Kim appeared in the comedy drama film Virus alongside Bae Doona.

== Personal life ==
Kim Yoon-seok married actress Bang Ju-ran in 2002; the couple met while performing in the 2000 play Blood Brothers. They have two daughters.

== Filmography ==
=== Film ===
Feature film appearances
Year	Title	Role	Note(s)	Ref.
1994	A Little Lover	Student at karaoke	Bit part	
2001	Kiss Me Much	Bailiff 1	Bit part	
2002	Oollala Sisters	Sachae Quik	Bit part	
2004	The Big Swindle	Detective Lee		
2004	To Catch a Virgin Ghost	Hak-gyu		
2005	All for Love	Dong-man		
2005	My Girl and I	Biology teacher	Bit part	
2006	Running Wild	Joo Hyun-tae		
2006	Like a Virgin	Oh Dong-ku's father		
2006	Tazza: The High Rollers	Agwi		
2007	The Happy Life	Seong-wook		
2008	The Chaser	Eom Joong-ho		
2009	Running Turtle	Jo Pil-seong		
2009	Jeon Woo-chi: The Taoist Wizard	Hwadam		
2010	The Yellow Sea	Myun Jung-hak		
2011	Punch	Lee Dong-ju		
2012	The Thieves	Macao Park		
2013	South Bound	Choi Hae-gab		
2013	Hwayi: A Monster Boy	Seok-tae		
2014	Sea Fog	Captain Cheol-joo		
2014	Tazza: The Hidden Card	Agwi		
2015	C'est Si Bon	Oh Geun-tae (40s)		
2015	The Classified File	Gong Gil-yong		
2015	The Priests	Father Kim Bum-shin		
2016	Will You Be There?	Han Soo-hyun (present day)		
2017	The Fortress	Kim Sang-heon		
2017	1987: When the Day Comes	Park Cheo-won		
2018	Dark Figure of Crime	Hyung-min		
2019	Another Child	Dae-won	Directional debut	
2021	Escape from Mogadishu	Han Sin-seong		
2023	Noryang: Deadly Sea	Yi Sun-sin		
2024	About Family	Ham Mu-ok		
2025	Virus	Lee Gyun		
2026	White Blast	Gap-su		

=== Television ===
Key
†	Denotes television productions that have not yet been released

Series appearances
Year	Title	Role	Note(s)	Ref.
2004	Drama City "Anagram"	Detective	one act-drama	
2004	Drama City "Blue Skies in Jeju Island"	Kyung-soo	one act-drama	
2005	Drama City "Home Improvement Activity Log"	Kim Jin-kyu	one act-drama	
2005	Loveholic	Prosecution investigator		
2005	Resurrection	Cheon Gong-myung		
2006	Thank You, My Life	Kang Yoon-ho		
2006	Love Me When You Can	Han Dong-gyu		
2024	The Frog	Jeon Young-ha		
TBA	My Ghostly Running Mate †	Gu Young-jin		

== Theater ==
=== Plays ===
Play performances of Kim
Year	Title		Role	Theater	Date	Ref.
Year	English	Korean	Role	Theater	Date	Ref.
1988	A Streetcar Named Desire	욕망이라는 이름의 전차	Stanley Kowalski	Busan	—N/a	
1993	There Is a Soup	국물 있사옵니다	President, manager	Yeonwoo Small Theater	June 10 – July 4, 1993	
1993	Women's Rebellion	여성반란	Prime Minister, Mayor	Small Theater Sanwoolim	September 14 – October 10, 1993	
1994	Giselle	지젤	Hilarion	Batanggol Art Museum	January 13 – March 6, 1994	
1994	Diary of a Fat Sofa	살찐 소파에 대한 일기		Bidulgi Hall of the Dong-A Cultural Center	December 5–11, 1994	
1994	Bicycle	자전거				
1995	Waiting for Godot	고도를 기다리며	Didi	Yeondang Small Theater	May 16 – June 4, 1995	
1995	The Birthday Party	생일파티		Budu Theater		
1997	Lolita	로리타		Budu Theater		
1997	Moskito	모스키토		Hakjeon Green Theater	May 5 – November 2, 1997	
1998	Equus	에쿠우스	Alan			
2000	Assanace	아싸나체	Kuzma Plehanov	Small Theater All and Nucleus	May 19 – June 11, 2000	
2000	Blood Brothers	의형제	Troublemaker, Old Man, Police Officer, Inspector, Servant	Hakjeon Blue Theater	September 1 – December 31, 2000	
2001	The Name of Oedipus — Song of the Forbidden Flesh	오이디푸스의 이름 - 금지된 육체의 노래	Oedipus	Seoul Arts Center Free Theater	March 13 – December 18, 2000	
2001	Subway Line 1	지하철 1호선	Cheolsoo, passerby, evangelist	Hakjeon Green Theater	April 27 – June 17, 2001	
2001	Subway Line 1	지하철 1호선	Cheolsoo, passerby, evangelist	LG Art Center	August 18 – September 9, 2001	
2002	Long Day's Journey into Night	밤으로의 긴 여로	Edmund	Dongsung Art Center	April 5–28, 2002	
2006	Dream of Autumn	가을날의 꿈	Man	Arunguji Small Theater	July 7–30, 2006	
