= Park Jong-chul =

South Korean activist (1965–1987)

- Born: April 1, 1965; Busan, South Korea
- Died: January 14, 1987 (aged 21); Anti-Communist Detached Office, Karwol-dong, Yongsan District, Seoul, South Korea
- Cause of death: Asphyxiation by torture in the form of water cure
- Burial place: Moran Park, Hwado-eup Namyangju, South Korea; 37°38′45.2″N 127°19′14.4″E
- Education: Seoul National University
- Occupation: University Student

Korean name
- Hangul: 박종철
- Hanja: 朴鐘哲
- RR: Bak Jongcheol
- MR: Pak Chongch'ŏl

Park Jong-chul (Note: In this Korean name, the family name is Park.) (Korean: 박종철; April 1, 1965 – January 14, 1987) was a South Korean democracy movement activist. His death by torture was a key factor in sparking the June Democratic Struggle, which led to the democratization of South Korea.

== Biography ==
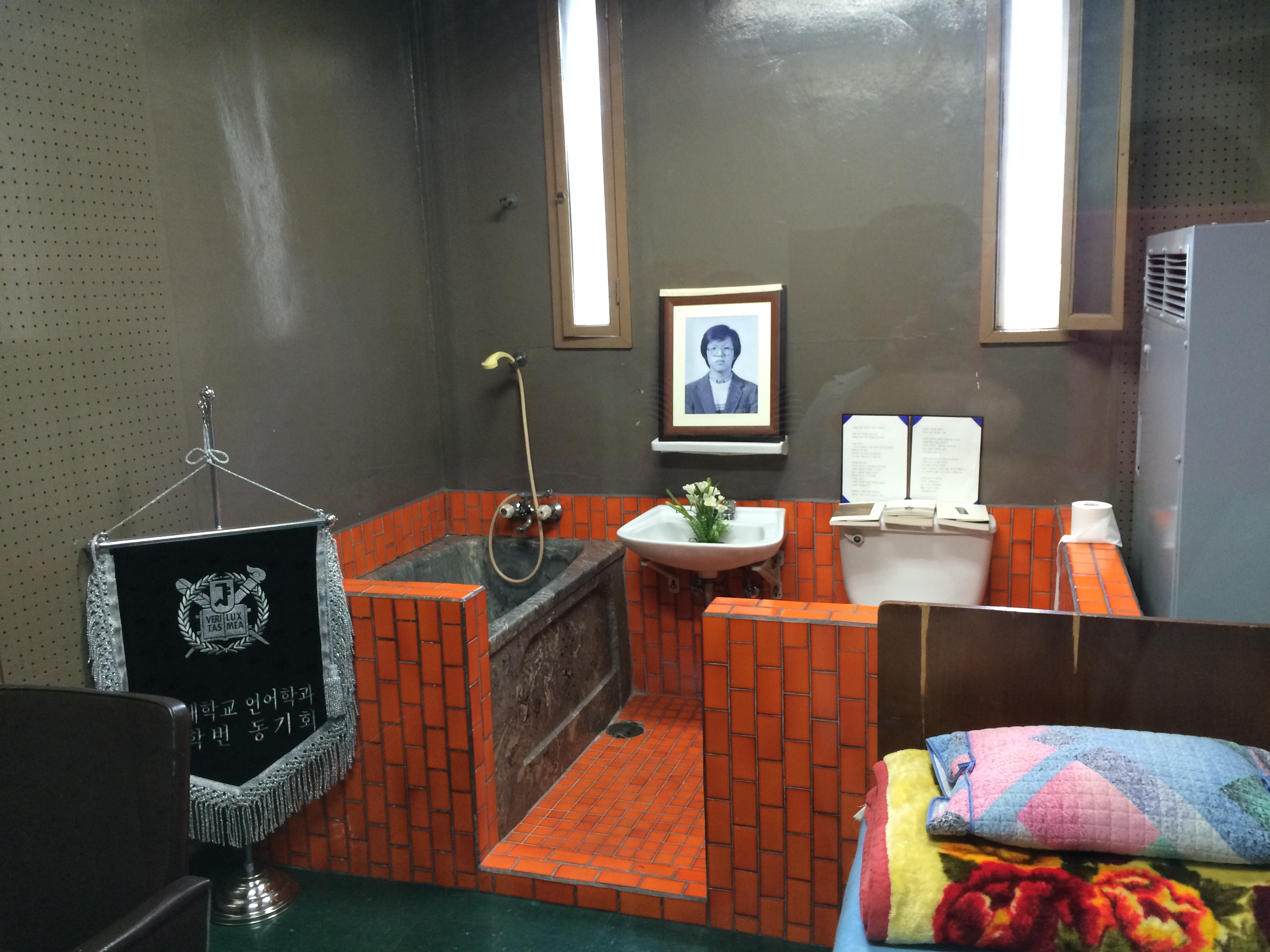
Park Jong Cheol Memorial Room in the National Police Headquarters' Anti-Communist Division, now the Namyeong-dong Human Rights Center

In the 1980s, as president of the student council in the linguistics department of Seoul National University, he was one of the activists in universities struggling against Chun Doo-hwan's dictatorship and the aftermath of the 1980 Gwangju Massacre. Detained during an investigation into such activities, Park refused to confess the whereabouts of one of his fellow activists. During the interrogation, authorities used waterboarding techniques to torture him in the National Police Headquarters' Anti-Communist Division, leading to his death on January 14.

A doctor from Chung-Ang University Hospital, Oh Yeon-sang, arrived at the scene and performed CPR for 30 minutes before eventually giving up. Once he told the officers of Park's death, he later recalled that "they rolled his body in a blanket and shoved it in an elevator". On January 15, Oh was interviewed by multiple reporters who came to his office. Later that day the authorities detained and interrogated him for 20 hours; afterwards Oh fled to Seoul outskirts for a week.

Information surrounding the events of Park's death was initially suppressed, with the police attributing the death to shock. Police claimed that he had died after an officer 'hit the desk with a thwack'. His death by torture helped spark the June Democracy Movement of 1987. His death, including the events of its immediate aftermath, was the subject of the movie 1987: When the Day Comes.

== See also ==
- June Democratic Struggle
