= 25th Moscow International Film Festival =

Film festival

- Location: Moscow, Russia
- Founded: 1959
- Awards: Grand Prix
- Festival date: 20–29 June 2003
- Website: www.moscowfilmfestival.ru

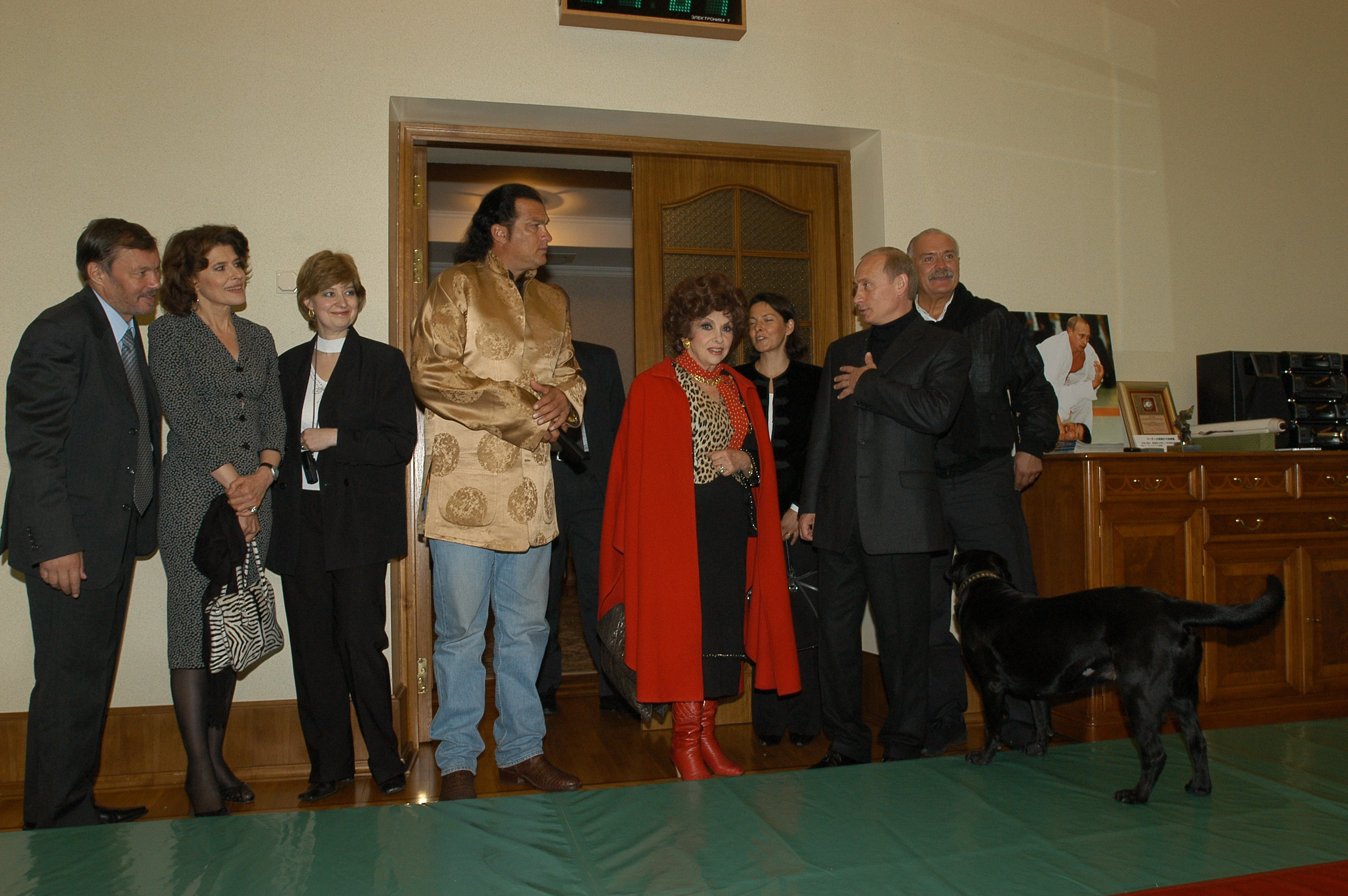
President Vladimir Putin meeting with actresses Gina Lollobrigida, Fanny Ardant and actor Steven Seagal, who were guests at the 25th Moscow International Film Festival.

The 25th Moscow International Film Festival was held from 20 to 29 June 2003. The Golden St. George was awarded to the Italian-Spanish film The End of a Mystery directed by Miguel Hermoso.

== Jury ==
- Sergei Bodrov (Russia – President of the Jury)
- Agnieszka Holland (Poland)
- Ken Russell (Great Britain)
- Moritz Bleibtreu (Germany)
- Babak Payami (Iran)
- Mika Kaurismäki (Finland)
- Olga Budina (Russia)

== Films in competition ==
The following films were selected for the main competition:

English title	Original title	Director(s)	Production country
Malamor	Malamor	Jorge Echeverry	Columbia
Petersburg	Petersburg	Irina Yevteyeva	Russia
The Stroll	Progulka	Alexei Uchitel	Russia
Warming Up Yesterday's Lunch	Podgryavane na vcherashniya obed	Kostadin Bonev	Bulgaria, Macedonia
Skagerrak	Skagerrak	Søren Kragh-Jacobsen	United Kingdom, Sweden, Denmark
Owl	Fukurō	Kaneto Shindo	Japan
Save the Green Planet!	Jigureul jikyeora!	Jang Joon-hwan	South Korea
Dancing in the Dust	Raghs dar chobar	Asghar Farhadi	Iran
To Kill a King	To Kill a King	Mike Barker	United Kingdom, United States, Germany
I'll Sleep When I'm Dead	I'll Sleep When I'm Dead	Mike Hodges	United Kingdom, United States
Eila	Eila	Jarmo Lampela	Finland
Yu	Yu	Franz Novotny	Austria
The End of a Mystery	La luz prodigiosa	Miguel Hermoso	Italy, Spain
Past Perfect	Passato prossimo	Maria Sole Tognazzi	Italy
Que sera, sera	Seja o Que Deus Quiser	Murilo Salles	Brazil
Roads to Koktebel	Koktebel	Alexey Popogrebsky, Boris Khlebnikov	Russia
It's Easier for a Camel...	Il est plus facile pour un chameau...	Valeria Bruni Tedeschi	France
The Afghan	The Afghan	Paula van der Oest	Germany, United Kingdom, Netherlands
A Long Weekend in Pest and Buda	Egy hét Pesten és Budán	Károly Makk	Hungary

== Awards ==
- Golden St. George: The End of a Mystery by Miguel Hermoso
- Special Silver St. George: Roads to Koktebel by Alexey Popogrebsky, Boris Khlebnikov
- Silver St.George:
  - Best Director: Jang Joon-hwan for Save the Green Planet!
  - Best Actor: Faramarz Gharibian for Dancing in the Dust
  - Best Actress: Shinobu Otake for Owl
- Special prize for an outstanding contribution to world cinema: Kaneto Shindo
- Stanislavsky Award: Fanny Ardant
