= Shinobu Otake =

Japanese actress

- 大竹 汀信
- Born: July 17, 1957 (age 69); Shinagawa, Tokyo, Japan
- Occupation: Actress
- Years active: 1973–present
- Agent: Avex Management, Inc.
- Spouses: Seiji Hattori (m. 1982; died 1987); Sanma Akashiya (m. 1988; div. 1992)
- Children: 2, including Imalu

Shinobu Otake (大竹 しのぶ, Ōtake Shinobu; born July 17, 1957) is a Japanese actress. She has won three Japanese Academy Awards: the 2000 Best Actress award for Railroad Man, and the 1979 awards for both Best Actress for The Incident, and Best Supporting Actress for Seishoku no ishibumi. She also won the award for best actress at the 12th Hochi Film Award for Eien no 1/2. At the 25th Moscow International Film Festival she won the award for Best Actress for her role in Owl. She has received a total of twelve nominations.

She was the favoured lead actress of director Kaneto Shindo after his previous lead actress, Nobuko Otowa, died in 1994, and featured in four of his films from Will to Live (1999) and Postcard (2011).

Otake has also acted on the stage. She performed during the last segment of the Tokyo 2020 Olympics Closing Ceremony along Tokyo’s Suginami Children Chorus, singing the song "Hoshimeguri no Uta" (Star Tour Song) composed by Kenji Miyazawa, as the Olympic flame was extinguished. Otake had a leading role of Dr. Ruth Wolff in a Japanese stage adaptation of The Doctor (2021).

== Personal life ==
Otake was born and grew up mostly in Tokyo. In 1982 she married Seiji Hattori, a Tokyo Broadcasting director who died in 1987. One year later, Otake married Akashiya Sanma, but got divorced in 1992. In the early 1990s Otake lived with playwright Hideki Noda.

Otake has two children, Nichika, a son by Hattori and Imaru, a daughter by Sanma. After her divorce she kept custody.

She previously relationship with Kanzaburō Nakamura XVIII who become lifelong friend and co star.

== Filmography ==
=== Film ===
Year	Film	Role	Notes	Ref.
1975	The Gate of Youth	Orie Maki		
1976	The Human Revolution 2	Nobuko		
1977	The Gate of Youth Part 2	Orie Maki		
1977	Tora-san Plays Cupid			
1978	The Demon			
1978	The Incident			
1978	Seishoku no ishibumi			
1979	Nomugi Pass	Mine Masai	Lead role	
1979	Oh, My son!			
1980	Twelve Months	Anja (voice)	Lead role	
1983	Children of Nagasaki			
1984	Mahjong Hōrōki	Mayumi		
1985	The Empty Table			
1986	Beyond the Shining Sea			
1987	Eien no 1/2		Lead role	
1992	Original Sin	Nami Tsuchiya	Lead role	
1993	Rex: A Dinosaur's Story	Naomi Ito		
1996	Five Women			
1998	Gakko III: The New Voyage			
1999	Railroad Man	Shizue Satō		
1999	The Black House			
1999	Will to Live			
2000	Shiki-Jitsu			
2001	Go			
2003	Like Asura		Lead role	
2003	Owl		Lead role	
2004	Otakus in Love			
2007	Kitokito!		Lead role	
2007	Into the Faraway Sky			
2007	Welcome to the Quiet Room	Nishino		
2010	My Darling is a Foreigner			
2010	Arrietty	Homily (voice)		
2010	Surely Someday			
2010	Here Comes the Bride, My Mom!	Yōko Morii	Lead role	
2011	Postcard		Lead role	
2013	Before the Vigil			
2013	Leaving on the 15th Spring			
2013	The Wind Rises	Mrs. Kurokawa (voice)		
2015	The Mourner			
2015	Pieta in the Toilet			
2015	Our Little Sister			
2015	Galaxy Turnpike			
2016	Black Widow Business	Sayoko Takeuchi	Lead role	
2016	Sanada 10 Braves	Yodo-dono		
2017	Mary and the Witch's Flower	Charlotte (voice)		
2018	Flea-picking Samurai	Osuzu		
2019	Shadowfall	Naomi Makabe		
2021	Fortune Favors Lady Nikuko	Nikuko (voice)	Lead role	
2021	The House of the Lost on the Cape	Kiwa (voice)		
2022	Hell Dogs	Noriko Kinugasa		
2023	The Boy and the Heron	Aiko (voice)		
2024	Who Were We?	Kii		
2025	Tokyo Taxi	Keiko (voice)		
2027	Boke Biyori	Chiharu Torikai	Lead role	

=== Television ===
Year	Title	Role	Network	Ref.
1975	Mizuiro no Toki	Tomoko Matsumiya	Lead role; Asadora	
1977	Kashin	Osato	Taiga drama	
1977	Taiyō ni Hoero!	Yōko Hamada	Episode 276	
1980	Shishi no Jidai	Chiyo	Taiga drama	
1983	Tokugawa Ieyasu	Odai no Kata	Taiga drama	
1986	Seven Men and Women, Summer Story	Momoko Kanzaki		
1987	Seven Men and Women, Autumn Story	Momoko Kanzaki		
1994	The Misery of Others is as Sweet as Honey	Mayuko Kurebayashi	Lead role	
1999	Genroku Ryōran	Riku	Taiga drama	
2011	Gō	Kōdai-in	Taiga drama	
2017	I'm Sorry, I Love You	Reiko Hyūga		
2019	Idaten	Ikue Ikebe	Taiga drama	
2022	The 13 Lords of the Shogun	Miko	Taiga drama	
2023	What Will You Do, Ieyasu?	Ōkurakyō no Tsubone	Taiga drama; cameo	

=== Dubbing ===
==== Live-action ====
- Cats, Old Deuteronomy (Judi Dench)
- West Side Story (1979 TBS edition), Maria (Natalie Wood)

==== Animation ====
- Inside Out, Sadness
- Inside Out 2, Sadness

== Commercials ==
In 2012, she became a representative for NTT DoCoMo's "Raku-Raku Smartphone", a smartphone aimed at the over-55s.

== Honours ==
- Kinuyo Tanaka Award (1992)
- Medal with Purple Ribbon (2011)
