= Malamor =

2003 film

- Directed by: Jorge Echeverry
- Produced by: Jorge Echeverry
- Starring: Gustavo Angarita
- Release dates: 26 June 2003 (Moscow); 3 September 2004 (Colombia)
- Running time: 92 minutes
- Country: Colombia
- Language: Spanish

Malamor is a 2003 Colombian drama film directed by Jorge Echeverry. It made its world premiere at the 25th Moscow International Film Festival and was also shown at the 2004 Cartagena International Film Festival and the 2004 Latin American Film Festival sponsored by the Organization of American States.

== Synopsis ==
The film explores the last ten days in the life of the drug-addicted seventeen-year-old girl Lisa, who harbors unrequited feelings for her mother's lover, Hache. After Lisa's death, Hache wanders the mountains in his grief.

== Cast ==
- Cristina Umaña as Lisa
- Gustavo Angarita as Hache
- Fabio Rubiano
- John Álex Toro
- Marcela Valencia

== Reception ==
The film was entered into the 25th Moscow International Film Festival. That showing was its world premiere; it premiered in Columbia at the 44th Cartagena International Film Festival in 2003. It was also shown at the 2004 Latin American Film Festival sponsored by the Organization of American States.

Prior to its release, the film received an Honorable Mention for Screenplay Project in the 1st National Call for Cinematography of the Ministry of Culture (Colombia) in 1998 and First Prize in Post-Production in the 2nd National Call for Cinematography of the Ministry of Culture (Colombia) in 1999. It subsequently received a Promotion Award in the 1st Call for the Film Development Fund (Colombia) in 2004.

Hank Sartin, writing for the Chicago Reader, said that Echeverri's narrative "strives to equate mental illness with poetry" but the "jarring mixture of dreamlike images and gritty realism never quite adds up to anything." Ronnie Scheib, writing for Variety, stated that the film marked a directorial change of pace with its delving into the "hysteria of adolescence" and its "odd rites, fervent impulsiveness and suicidal intensity," calling the actions of the character Lisa "as terrifying as they are seductive." While Echeverry succeeded in capturing the "beauty and purity of youth," Sheib opined that, while "interesting but disquieting," the film seemed unlikely to be shown widely outside of film festivals.
