= I'll Sleep When I'm Dead (2003 film) =

2003 film by Mike Hodges

- Theatrical release poster
- Directed by: Mike Hodges
- Written by: Trevor Preston
- Produced by: Michael Corrente; Mike E.Kaplan
- Starring: Clive Owen; Charlotte Rampling; Jonathan Rhys-Meyers; Malcolm McDowell
- Cinematography: Michael Garfath
- Edited by: Paul Carlin
- Music by: Simon Fisher-Turner
- Production companies: Will & Co.
- Distributed by: Lagoon Entertainment (United Kingdom); Paramount Classics (North America, Australia, New Zealand, Japan and Middle East)
- Release dates: 16 May 2003 (Cannes Film Festival); 16 June 2004
- Running time: 102 minutes
- Countries: United Kingdom; United States
- Language: English
- Box office: $490,964

I'll Sleep When I'm Dead is a 2003 crime film directed by Mike Hodges (his last film), from a screenplay by Trevor Preston. The film bears striking similarities to Hodges' directorial debut, the classic 1970 crime drama Get Carter. Both films feature men who return to their former hometowns to investigate the death of a brother who has died under mysterious circumstances.

== Plot ==
Davey Graham arrives at an upper-class party to sell drugs to a woman named Stella. As he leaves, Stella's date watches him and makes a call on his mobile phone. Outside the party, three men are waiting for Davey in a black Range Rover, including a car dealer named Boad. They follow Davey through London and ambush him in an alley. They drag him into a garage, where Boad rapes him while the others hold him down.

At dawn, a visibly distressed Davey emerges from the garage and stumbles home, where he draws a bath for himself and gets in fully clothed. Several hours later, his friend Mickser arrives to pick him up. He discovers Davey dead in the bath, with his throat slashed. Mickser visits Helen and asks her how to get in touch with Davey's brother Will. She says that she has stopped receiving letters from Will, who left London three years earlier.

Will has been working in the country as a forester. He's unshaven with long hair and he lives in a van. After he is sacked from his job for having no papers, he heads to the sea to take a ferry out of England when he sees Davey in the terminal. After realizing it is a hallucination, he begins calling Davey's flat. Receiving no answer he returns to London, where he learns that Davey is dead. His return to London stirs up the anxiety of crime boss Frank Turner, who sends word to Will that he should leave town after he buries his brother. Will's old gang urge him to return for good, saying that Turner could be overtaken easily. Will makes it clear that he is not interested in returning to his old life. He visits Helen and apologizes for leaving her. He explains that he has been grieving for 'a life wasted', lamenting the fact that Davey also wasted his.

Will orders a second post-mortem to try to determine why Davey would kill himself. It reveals that he was raped the night before he died, in addition to the fact that Davey ejaculated during the rape. The coroner explains that it was a result of the anal stimulation, surmising that Davey probably killed himself over the shame he felt after involuntarily ejaculating. He refers Will to a psychologist who can explain the phenomenon more eloquently. As Will listens to the psychologist explain the mindset of the rapist and the mental damage of a rape victim, he takes his first drink in three years. Mickser visits the woman who hosted the party where Davey made his sale. The hostess remembers seeing the man make a phone call as Davey left and she tracks down his identity. Will and Mickser visit the man who leads them to Boad. During a dinner party at Boad's house, Will cases the grounds and leaves. Will's cohorts pull a prank at Turner's house, hog-tying one of his bodyguards in a bra and panties. Irate, Turner hires an Irish hitman to retaliate.

Will visits a garage and uncovers a vintage Jaguar. He retrieves a suitcase from the trunk and checks into a hotel. The suitcase is full of money, clothes and a gun. Will has a suit pressed and orders a barber to cut off his long hair and beard. Clean cut and in his suit, he has the Jaguar washed and heads to Boad's house. On his way, he calls Helen and tells her to pack a bag, but Turner's hitman is waiting outside her house. At Boad's, Will trips the alarm on a car in the garage, drawing Boad out of the house. Will kills his dog and then points his gun at Boad, asking him why he raped Davey.

Boad explains that he'd been following Davey for six weeks, fascinated by how fake he was. He hated the way that Davey waltzed through life, conning everyone with his good looks and charm. Boad says that he wanted to make Davey realize that he was worthless. Will tells Boad that he will kill him later, because killing him there would be too easy. As he's walking away from the house, he pauses and then returns to the garage and kills Boad. Helen is shown sitting on the staircase in her flat, arms crossed, waiting with Turner's hitman for Will to arrive. The film ends on an ambiguous note as Will watches a man hitting golf balls into the ocean. It is the same shot and voice-over that opens the film. Will speaks about how most thoughts are just memories and after someone is gone, the memories of him are all that's left. He gets into his car and drives off.

== Cast ==
- Clive Owen as Will Graham
- Charlotte Rampling as Helen
- Jonathan Rhys-Meyers as Davey Graham
- Malcolm McDowell as Boad
- Jamie Foreman as Mickster
- Ken Stott as Frank Turner
- Sylvia Syms as Mrs. Bank

== Reception ==
The film was entered into the 25th Moscow International Film Festival.

The film received mixed reviews and has a 46% approval rating on Rotten Tomatoes from 90 reviews. The website's critics consensus states, "I'll Sleep When I'm Dead's spare performances and slick style are undermined by a lack of cohesive story, yielding a neatly packaged noir with little substance beneath its polished surface." However, Roger Ebert gave the film three-and-a-half out of four stars, writing that "there is a tangible pleasure in following enigmatic characters through the shadows of their lives; deprived for a time of plot, given characters who are not clearly labeled and assigned moral categories, we're allowed to make judgments based on their manner and speech." In the New York Observer, Andrew Sarris wrote, "Does the film work? All I know is that it stays in my mind for its ambitiously autumnal essence, but it may not be everyone's cup of tea." According to Owen Gleiberman, "Hodges...still knows how to unspool a mystery with a hypnotic pace of sadistic intrigue."

Ty Burr of the Boston Globe reviewed the film negatively, writing that it "feels undernourished in plot, characterization, and dialogue, and what should play with minimalist high tension is allowed to sag lower and lower until it simply grounds out. The result is a revenge thriller that's too taken with its own ambience to actually thrill".

== Box office ==
The film was released on 16 June 2004 and grossed $13,415 in the opening weekend. It went on to gross $360,759 domestically and $130,205 in the foreign markets for a worldwide total of $490,964.
