= Owl (film) =

2003 Japanese film

- Film poster
- Directed by: Kaneto Shindō
- Written by: Kaneto Shindō
- Produced by: Jiro Shindō
- Starring: Shinobu Otake; Ayumi Ito
- Cinematography: Yoshiyuki Miyake; Masahiko Hayashi
- Edited by: Yukio Watanabe
- Music by: Hikaru Hayashi
- Production company: Kindai Eiga Kyokai
- Release date: 7 February 2004 (Japan)
- Running time: 119 minutes
- Country: Japan
- Language: Japanese

Owl (Japanese: ふくろう, Hepburn: Fukurō) is a 2003 Japanese black comedy film written and directed by Kaneto Shindō. It was entered into the 25th Moscow International Film Festival where Shinobu Otake won the award for Best Actress and Shindō was awarded a special prize for contribution to world cinema.

== Plot ==
Around 1980, two women, a 37-year-old mother and her 17-year-old daughter, the last occupants of a farming village called "Kibogaoka" for Japanese returnees from Manchuria, are slowly starving to death. As the daughter contemplates eating a lizard, the mother suggests a better way to survive. They telephone a dam construction site and offer themselves as prostitutes. A worker comes to visit them and has sex with the mother. Afterwards, the women allegedly offer him Shōchū, but the liquid was actually made from a highly poisonous plant. This causes him to foam at the mouth, emit animal noises, and then die. They cart his body off and celebrate getting his money.

With the money, the women are able to get food to eat, and have their electricity and water supplies switched back on. They seduce and kill both the electrician and the plumber in the same way, gaining more money, as well as another construction worker and the boss of the electrician.

The local police inspector comes to investigate the disappearances of the men. As the women are about to seduce him, Mizuguchi, an employee of the repatriation department, whose father set up the unsuccessful village, arrives. The inspector quickly leaves, pretending he had been examining the house's stability. For the first time, the daughter, rather than the mother, sleeps with Mizuguchi. He gives them 500,000 yen and announces intentions to suicide in order to atone for his father's mistake of building a village on barren land. The mother decides not to kill him with the special drink. He asks 20,000 yen back for travelling to the site of his suicide and leaves.

Next, the women kill the boss of the dam construction site who was looking for missing workers. They make a plan to travel the world once they have saved 1.5 million yen. Mizuguchi surprisingly returns, saying that after he survived his attempt at suicide, he realised that his plan was a sin, and that he wants to marry the daughter. The inspector also shows up, and the women hide Mizuguchi. When a stranger appears at the door, they hide the inspector in another room. The stranger turns out to be Koji, the mother's nephew. Koji confesses that he avenged the death of his mother after she had been mistreated by her employers and was himself badly hurt by a servant's gun. The three men confront each other, and all three end up dead. After disposing of the bodies, the women drink beer and sing the anthem of their village.

One year later, a group of men, including policemen, the local mayor and the chief of the dam-building company, enter the deserted house, which is about to be demolished like the other abandoned buildings. They recount the recent discovery of 9 corpses, several of which had traces of a poisonous liquid in them, but do not draw links to the disappeared mother and daughter, considering them incapable of such a crime.

== Cast ==
- Shinobu Otake as Mother
- Ayumi Ito as Daughter
- Tomorowo Taguchi as Plumber
- Katsumi Kiba as Dam construction worker A
- Mansaku Ikeuchi as Police inspector
- Akira Emoto as Dam construction worker B
- Daijiro Hara as Dam construction boss
- Kintaro Sakikage as Electrician's boss
- Naomasa Musaka as Electrician
- Ippei Kanie as Mizuguchi
- Yasuhiko Ohchi as Koji, the mother's nephew

== Production ==
Except for a few views of the buildings in the village, and some exterior shots during Mizuguchi's and Koji's accounts, the entire film is shot on a single set, the interior of the women's house. This was partly due to director Shindō's mobility problems.

== Release ==
Owl premiered at the 25th Moscow International Film Festival, held between 20 and 29 June 2003, and saw its regular Japanese release in February the following year.

== Reception ==
Derek Elley, film critic at Variety Asia, called it "a delightful rondo of sex and death, underpinned by a tart commentary on Japan's post-war aspirations."

== Legacy ==
Owl was screened at a 2012 retrospective on Shindō and Kōzaburō Yoshimura in London, organised by the British Film Institute and the Japan Foundation.

== Awards ==
- Silver St. George for actress Shinobu Otake and Special prize for an outstanding contribution to the world cinema for Kaneto Shindō at the 25th Moscow International Film Festival
