= 1987: When the Day Comes =

2017 South Korean historical film

- Theatrical release poster
- Directed by: Jang Joon-hwan
- Written by: Kim Kyung-chan
- Produced by: Jung Won-chan; Jang Young-hwan
- Starring: Kim Yoon-seok; Ha Jung-woo; Yoo Hae-jin; Kim Tae-ri; Park Hee-soon; Lee Hee-joon
- Cinematography: Kim Woo-hyung
- Edited by: Yang Jin-mo
- Music by: Kim Tae-seong
- Production company: Woojeung Film
- Distributed by: CJ Entertainment
- Release date: December 27, 2017
- Running time: 129 minutes
- Country: South Korea
- Language: Korean
- Budget: ₩15 billion (US$14 million)
- Box office: US$54.5 million (South Korea)

1987: When the Day Comes is a 2017 South Korean political thriller film directed by Jang Joon-hwan and written by Kim Kyung-chan. The film stars Kim Yoon-seok, Ha Jung-woo, Yoo Hae-jin, Kim Tae-ri, Park Hee-soon and Lee Hee-joon. Set in 1987 and based on a true story, the film focuses on the events that led up to the June Democratic Uprising in Korea, triggered by the death of a student protester during police interrogation which the authorities conspired to cover up. Jang compared the overall structure of the film to a relay race, with the focus of the story shifting between several characters to convey the collective effort of political resistance. The film was released in theaters on December 27, 2017.

== Plot ==
Under the military regime of President Chun Doo-hwan, a student activist named Park Jong-chul dies during interrogation. Park Cheo-won, a ruthless commissioner in charge of investigating suspected communists, has oversight of the interrogation and opts to cover it up by cremating the body before an autopsy can be carried out and reporting the death as a heart attack. Commissioner Park's men approach a drunken Prosecutor Choi to approve the cremation, but he refuses and resists their efforts to strong-arm him. The autopsy takes place despite Commissioner Park's efforts, with Jong-chul's uncle present as it is made evident the student's death was the result of foul play. The uncle declares this outside the hospital building, and Prosecutor Choi, after being fired, leaves evidence from the autopsy for Yoon Sang-sam, a reporter hoping to investigate the story despite a country-wide regulation against reporting on the death. Yoon's findings reveal to the public that Park Jong-chul died by asphyxiation, rather than cardiac arrest, as the police report claimed.

Facing public outcry, Commissioner Park chooses two detectives to take the full blame for the crime. He promises one, the loyal detective Jo Han-kyung, that he will serve a reduced sentence for involuntary manslaughter rather than murder, but is unable to fulfill this promise, leading to a number of intense altercations between Jo and his colleagues when they visit him at the prison. Prison guard Han Byung-yong, who overhears some of these exchanges, is revealed to be in contact with high-ranking political activists, and attempts to convince his warden to disclose the records from the visits, which provide incriminating evidence of a cover-up.

Han's niece, Yeon-hee, is a college student who occasionally helps him deliver messages, but is otherwise disinterested in activism. Yeon-hee finds herself in the middle of a violent clash between protesters and police, and is saved from a violent policeman by a student activist. The two reconnect on campus, and Yeon-hee attends the activist's club where footage of the Gwangju uprising is shown during a meeting, but she remains resistant to joining the cause. Meanwhile, the warden finally agrees to disclose the visitation records after witnessing Commissioner Park threatening Detective Jo and his family, and being violently beaten by Park's cronies when he protests. Han asks Yeon-hee to deliver the records to his contact, but she refuses. Han attempts to do so himself, but Commissioner Park's men locate his contact before he gets the chance, and one of Park's men recognizes Han. They later abduct him and torture him in the same interrogation room where Park Jong-chul was killed. Commissioner Park reveals details of his childhood in North Korea, in which he watched his adopted brother turned radical communist murder his family while torturing Han.

Remorseful over her uncle's arrest, Yeon-hee independently delivers the information to Han's contact. The information finds its way to the Catholic Priests' Association for Justice, who make a public statement that Park Jong-chul was killed during interrogation by the two detectives arrested along with three others, and Commissioner Park had direct oversight and attempted to cover up the killing. A flashback to Jong-chul's death is shown, in which Detective Jo taunts him by claiming that if he dies in that room, nobody will care. Commissioner Park discovers that President Chun has personally approved having him arrested and blamed entirely for Jong-chul's death. Han is released and returns to his family. Later, Yeon-hee sees a picture in a newspaper of the handsome activist she met, severely wounded at a recent protest — he is revealed to be Lee Han-yeol, a real-life student protester who was shot in the head and killed by a police tear gas canister. Devastated over the death of her newfound friend, Yeon-hee finally joins the movement for democracy.

== Cast ==
=== Main ===
- Kim Yoon-seok as Commissioner Park Cheo-won
- Ha Jung-woo as Prosecutor Choi Hwan
- Yoo Hae-jin as prison guard and activist Han Byung-yong
- Kim Tae-ri as Yeon-hee, niece of Byung-yong
- Park Hee-soon as Lieutenant Jo Han-kyung
- Lee Hee-joon as Reporter Yoon Sang-sam

=== Supporting ===
- Kim Eui-sung as Lee Boo-young
- Yoo Seung-mok as Yoo Jung-bang
- Hyun Bong-shik as Park Won-taek
- Jo Woo-jin as Park Wol-gil
- Kim Jong-soo as Park Jung-ki
- Kim Gook-hee as Han Byeong-yong
- Han Joon-woo as Black suit man
- Kim Soo-jin as Yeon-hee's mother
- Choi Kwang-il as Warden Ahn Yoo
- Yoo Jung-ho as Reporter
- Park Kyung-hye as Jeong-mi

=== Special appearance ===
- Sul Kyung-gu as Kim Jeong-nam
- Yeo Jin-goo as Park Jong-chul
- Gang Dong-won as Lee Han-yeol
- Moon Sung-keun as Lt. Gen Jang Se-dong
- Oh Dal-su as Yi Doo-seok
- Ko Chang-seok as Jeong Gu-jong
- Woo Hyun as Director General of Police Kang Min-chang
- Jung In-gi as Priest Kim Seung-hoon
- Moon So-ri as Woman in the plaza (voice)
- Lee Hwa-ryong as Catholic priest Ham Se-woong

== Production ==
Principal photography began on April 20, 2017, and ended on August 27, 2017.

=== Music ===
The soundtrack music was composed by Kim Tae-seong. There are 22 songs as listed below.

- "When the Day Comes" - Lee Hanyeol Choir & Daegun Chamber Choir
- "1987"
- "Namyoung-Dong"
- "The Portrait of the Deceased"
- "Father Has No Words"
- "1980"
- "Hidden Road by Yeonheui" - Kim Tae-ri & Gang Dong-won
- "The Funeral"
- "Reporters"
- "A Time When the Wind Starts To Blow"
- "Press Guidelines"
- "Counter-Communist Branch of the Police"
- "I Didn't Kill Him"
- "Indirect Election"
- "Chase"
- "Heartbroken"
- "The Clue"
- "The Decision"
- "Final"
- "The Judgement"
- "When the Day Comes (Choir Version)"
- "Hidden Road by Lee Hanyeol" - Kim Tae-ri & Gang Dong-won

== Reception ==
Released on December 27, 2017, the film has drawn more than 7.2 million viewers in South Korea.

=== Favorable response ===
Robert Abele of the Los Angeles Times wrote: "Probably no one movie could capture the scope of citizens forcing regime change in a dictatorial country, but the South Korean feature "1987: When the Day Comes" valiantly tries in its own thriller-ish way."

Maggie Lee of Variety described it as "a compelling depiction of how brave individuals from all walks of life mobilized a whole nation to bring a recalcitrant dictator and his henchmen to their knees."

James Marsh of the South China Morning Post rated it 3.5/5 and wrote: "The film's efforts to simultaneously cover political corruption, police brutality, suppression of the media and a doomed romance at times threaten to overwhelm this captivating account of a pivotal moment in Korean history. Slick and accomplished, 1987: When the Day Comes is also single-minded and forthright in its intentions, propelled by an exasperated nation which demanded more of its public officials."

In a review for the LA Review of Books, Colin Marshall wrote: "1987 essentially tells, in the shakily-shot tension-filled style of a modern TV crime drama, a tale of the awakening of Korean public sentiment." He concluded: "A film like 1987 evidences an understanding of this power of mainstream historical fiction to shape the perception of the past, and it uses that power in a benign if sometimes heavy-handed fashion."

Shim Sun-ah of Yonhap News Agency wrote: "The story is all the more inspiring because it shows how ordinary people, not heroes, can change the world when they band together "to do the right thing."

John Berra of Screen International wrote: "The lengthy running time flies by due to his marshalling of the rebellion (or "grand revolution" as Chun has the gall to call it) into a nail-biting thriller complete with confidently handled set-pieces, expert cross-cutting and measured use of split-screen."

=== Critical response ===
Puppet Tripeni Juniman of CNN Indonesia wrote: "The number of characters and the speed of the change of scenery has the potential to make the audience confused and difficult to digest the complicated 1987 story. Apart from that, 1987 can be used as a benchmark for South Korean historical drama films that tell honestly and bravely.

== Awards and nominations ==
Awards	Category	Recipient	Result	Ref.
12th Asian Film Awards	Best Actor	Kim Yoon-seok	Nominated	
CinemAsia Film Festival	Best Director	Jang Joon-hwan	Won	
9th KOFRA Film Awards	Best Film	1987: When the Day Comes	Won	
9th KOFRA Film Awards	Best Director	Jang Joon-hwan	Won	
54th Baeksang Arts Awards	Grand Prize (Daesang)	1987: When the Day Comes	Won	
54th Baeksang Arts Awards	Grand Prize (Daesang)	Kim Yoon-seok	Nominated	
54th Baeksang Arts Awards	Best Film	1987: When the Day Comes	Nominated	
54th Baeksang Arts Awards	Best Director	Jang Joon-hwan	Nominated	
54th Baeksang Arts Awards	Best Actor	Kim Yoon-seok	Won	
54th Baeksang Arts Awards	Best Supporting Actor	Park Hee-soon	Won	
54th Baeksang Arts Awards	Best Screenplay	Kim Kyung-chan	Won	
23rd Chunsa Film Art Awards	Best Director	Jang Joon-hwan	Nominated	
23rd Chunsa Film Art Awards	Best Screenplay	Kim Kyung-chan	Nominated	
23rd Chunsa Film Art Awards	Best Actor	Kim Yoon-seok	Nominated	
23rd Chunsa Film Art Awards	Best Actress	Kim Tae-ri	Nominated	
14th Jecheon International Music & Film Festival	JIMFF OST	Kim Tae-seong	Won	
27th Buil Film Awards	Best Film	1987: When the Day Comes	Nominated	
27th Buil Film Awards	Best Director	Jang Joon-hwan	Nominated	
27th Buil Film Awards	Best Screenplay	Kim Kyung-chan	Nominated	
27th Buil Film Awards	Best Actor	Kim Yoon-seok	Nominated	
27th Buil Film Awards	Best Supporting Actor	Jo Woo-jin	Nominated	
27th Buil Film Awards	Best Music	Kim Tae-seong	Nominated	
27th Buil Film Awards	Best Cinematography	Kim Woo-hyung	Won	
55th Grand Bell Awards	Best Film	1987: When the Day Comes	Nominated	
55th Grand Bell Awards	Best Director	Jang Joon-hwan	Won	
55th Grand Bell Awards	Best Actor	Kim Yoon-seok	Nominated	
55th Grand Bell Awards	Best Actress	Kim Tae-ri	Nominated	
55th Grand Bell Awards	Best Screenplay	Kim Kyung-chan	Nominated	
55th Grand Bell Awards	Best Cinematography	Kim Woo-hyung	Nominated	
55th Grand Bell Awards	Best Editing	Yang Jin-mo	Nominated	
55th Grand Bell Awards	Best Lightning	Kim Seung-kyu	Nominated	
55th Grand Bell Awards	Best Costume Design	Chae Kyung-hwa, Lee Eun-yi	Nominated	
55th Grand Bell Awards	Best Music	Kim Tae-seong	Nominated	
55th Grand Bell Awards	Best Planning	Lee Woo-jung	Won	
2nd The Seoul Awards	Best Film	1987: When the Day Comes	Nominated	
2nd The Seoul Awards	Best Supporting Actress	Kim Tae-ri	Nominated	
38th Korean Association of Film Critics Awards	Best Film	1987: When the Day Comes	Won	
38th Korean Association of Film Critics Awards	Top 11 Films	1987: When the Day Comes	Won	
38th Korean Association of Film Critics Awards	Best Music	Kim Tae-sung	Won	
39th Blue Dragon Film Awards	Best Film	1987: When the Day Comes	Won	
39th Blue Dragon Film Awards	Best Director	Jang Joon-hwan	Nominated	
39th Blue Dragon Film Awards	Best Screenplay	Kim Kyung-chan	Nominated	
39th Blue Dragon Film Awards	Best Actor	Kim Yoon-seok	Won	
39th Blue Dragon Film Awards	Best Supporting Actor	Yoo Hae-jin	Nominated	
39th Blue Dragon Film Awards	Best Cinematography and Lightning	Kim Woo-hyung & Kim Seung-kyu	Won	
39th Blue Dragon Film Awards	Best Editing	Yang Jin-mo	Nominated	
39th Blue Dragon Film Awards	Best Music	Kim Tae-seong	Nominated	
39th Blue Dragon Film Awards	Best Art Direction	Han Ah-reum	Nominated	
39th Blue Dragon Film Awards	Technical Award (Costume)	Chae Kyung-sun, Lee Eun-yi	Won	
8th AACTA Awards	Best Asian Film	1987: When the Day Comes	Nominated	
18th Udine Far East Film Festival	Audience Award	Jang Joon-hwan	Won	
18th Udine Far East Film Festival	Black Dragon Audience Award	Jang Joon-hwan	Won	
5th Korean Film Producers Association Awards	Best Film	1987: When the Day Comes	Won	
5th Korean Film Producers Association Awards	Best Screenplay	Kim Kyung-chan	Won	
18th Director's Cut Awards	Best Director	Jang Joon-hwan	Won	
18th Director's Cut Awards	Best Screenplay	Kim Kyung-chan	Won	
