= The Yellow Sea (film) =

2010 South Korean action thriller film

- Theatrical release poster
- Directed by: Na Hong-jin
- Written by: Na Hong-jin
- Starring: Ha Jung-woo; Kim Yoon-seok; Jo Sung-ha
- Cinematography: Lee Sung-jae
- Music by: Youngkyu Jang; Byung-hoon Lee
- Production companies: Showbox; Fox International Productions; Popcorn Films; Wellmade
- Distributed by: 20th Century Fox
- Release date: December 22, 2010
- Running time: 140 minutes
- Country: South Korea
- Languages: Korean; Mandarin
- Budget: US$9 million
- Box office: US$15.8 million

The Yellow Sea (Korean: 황해; Hanja: 黃海; RR: Hwanghae) is a 2010 South Korean action thriller film directed by Na Hong-jin and starring Ha Jung-woo and Kim Yoon-seok in the lead roles. This film marks the reunion of the director and the lead actors who also first collaborated for the 2008 film The Chaser, in which Ha Jung-woo played the antagonist and Kim Yoon-seok played the protagonist. In The Yellow Sea, Ha Jung-woo plays the protagonist while Kim Yoon-seok plays the antagonist.

The Yellow Sea was released in South Korea on 22 December 2010.

== Plot ==
In the northeastern Chinese city of Yanji in Yanbian Prefecture, Gu-nam (Ha Jung-woo), an ethnic Korean, or Joseonjok, toils away as a taxi driver. When not working, he is often found at gambling halls. Gu-nam is now in serious debt. His wife left to work in South Korea and promised to send money back. He has yet to hear from her and is tormented by nightmares of her having an extra-marital affair. To make matters worse, Gu-nam is fired from his job and debt collectors take most of his severance pay.

Local gangster Myun Jung-hak (Kim Yoon-seok), offers him a deal: if Gu-nam goes to South Korea to kill a professor named Kim Seung-hyun, he will get CN¥57,000 (US$10,000). Gu-nam accepts and leaves for South Korea by train and a rickety fishing boat, with US$500 for expenses.

When Gu-nam arrives in South Korea, he scopes out Seung-hyun's apartment while searching for his wife in his downtime. The night before his boat is due to return to China, Gu-nam witnesses Seung-hyun being ambushed and killed by his driver and two accomplices inside his apartment building's stairwell. After fending off and killing the driver, Gu-nam cuts off Seung-hyun's thumb, as per Jung-hak's contract, but is spotted by Seung-hyun's wife and is forced to flee the police. Upon arriving at the supposed location for the boat back to China, there is no one to pick Gu-nam up, and he realizes he has been set up with no path for return.

It is revealed that a businessman named Kim Tae-won had hired the driver to kill Seung-hyun. Tae-won's henchmen begin capturing and interrogating other Joseonjok in an attempt to find Gu-nam, eventually deducing that Gu-nam was hired by Jung-hak. Tae-won sends his top henchman Choi to China to kill Jung-hak, but Jung-hak defeats Choi's associates and returns with him to Korea to force a meeting with Tae-won. They strike a deal, with Tae-won promising to pay out Jung-hak for finding and killing Gu-nam.

On the run from the police, Gu-nam abducts and interrogates one of Jung-hak's smugglers and arranges a return to China via cargo ship. At the same time, he sees reports on TV that a woman matching the description of his wife had been killed by a man he had investigated as being connected to his wife earlier. Gu-nam hires an outside investigator to check the body and confirm if the woman killed was his wife, and when the investigator cannot tell if it is her, he lies to Gu-nam and arranges to have the woman cremated and the ashes delivered to Gu-nam for cash.

After arriving at the cargo ship, Gu-nam realizes he has been set up again, and narrowly escapes Jung-hak's men. When some of them are arrested and direct the police towards Tae-won, Tae-won sends men to eliminate Jung-hak and his crew, and following a struggle, a wounded Jung-hak escapes and leaves for Tae-won's hideout.

Gu-nam returns to Seung-hyun's apartment and promises his widow to kill the man responsible for her husband's murder. With new information from the widow, Gu-nam searches the driver's apartment and learns Tae-won's name and location after capturing Choi, who had been in contact with the driver, but Gu-nam is then ambushed by a pair of men on his way to the hideout.

At the hideout, Tae-won learns that Jung-hak acquired Seung-hyun's murder contract through a banker named Kim Jung-hwan. Jung-hak ambushes Tae-won and his men, and after a lengthy conflict, the two are mortally wounded. Gu-nam fends off his ambushers and retrieves Jung-hwan's business card off of them before arriving at the hideout and finding a dying Tae-won, who mumbles that he had Seung-hyun killed for having an affair with his wife. Jung-hak passes out at the wheel of his van and crashes at the station entrance, dying from his wounds.

At a restaurant, a wounded Gu-nam meets with the man he hired to identify his wife and is given a box of ashes. After following the business card to Jung-hwan's bank, Gu-nam leaves after seeing Seung-hyun's widow talking to Jung-hwan, deducing that she had hired him to kill her own husband. Both Tae-won and Seung-hyun's wife had put a hit on Seung-hyun; Tae-won for having an affair with his wife, Seung-hyun's wife for cheating on her.

Gu-nam heads to a pier and takes a fisherman hostage and orders him to go to Yanbian. While on the boat, he has a vision of his wife leaving on a train; he succumbs to his wounds en route back to China, and the fisherman dumps Gu-nam's body and the ashes in the water. In an ambiguous mid-credit scene, Gu-nam's wife arrives home by train.

== Cast ==
- Ha Jung-woo as Gu-nam
- Kim Yoon-seok as Myun Jung-hak
- Jo Sung-ha as Tae-won
- Lee Chul-min as Choi Sung-nam
- Kwak Do-won as Prof. Kim Seung-hyun
- Lim Ye-won as Prof. Kim's wife
- Tak Sung-eun as Gu-nam's wife
- Kim Ki-hwan as Prof. Kim's driver
- Ki Se-hyung as Tae-won's subordinate
- Lee El as Joo-young, Tae-won's mistress
- Oh Yoon-hong as Tae-won's wife
- Jung Man-sik as Detective
- Jung Min-sung as Detective
- Kim Dong-hyun as Detective
- Park Byung-eun as bank employee
- Jang So-yeon as employee at Do-man Hotel
- Yang Ki-won as detective
- Sung Byoung-sook as Gu-nam's mother
- Kong Jung-hwan as Jeon Pil-kyoo
- Baek Won-gil as Korean-Chinese kidnapper 1
- Kang Hyun-joong as Busan port sailor
- Yoo Ha-bok as Yanbian taxi boss
- Lee Hee-joon as policeman
- Lee Jun-hyeok as dog seller 2
- Kim Jae-hwa as Jung-hak's girlfriend (uncredited)

== Release ==
The film was screened in the Un Certain Regard section at the 2011 Cannes Film Festival, as well as the 2011 Filmfest München.

The Australian and UK films rights were sold to Bounty Films. The UK release of the film was on October 21, 2011.

The film had special screening in the Korean Horizons section of the 25th New York Asian Film Festival on 19 July 2026 as part of the 25th anniversary of the festival.

== Reception ==
The film opened on December 22, 2010, in South Korea and was top of the box office, selling 1.05 million tickets in its first five days of release, according to the Korean Film Council. The film sold a total of 2,142,742 tickets nationwide.

The film received positive critical reviews. The review aggregator website Rotten Tomatoes reported that 88% of 25 critics have given the film a positive reviews. On review aggregator website Metacritic, the film has a weighted average score of 70 out of 100 based on 19 critics, indicating "generally positive reviews".

Mark Olsen of The Los Angeles Times wrote "A breakneck mix of bone-crunching freneticism and bloody close-quarters knife-fighting with a strand of romantic melancholy". The New York Times's Manohla Dargis wrote "A rush of a movie from South Korea that slips and slides from horror to humor on rivers of blood and offers the haunting image of a man, primitive incarnate, beating other men with an enormous, gnawed-over meat bone." The Hollywood Reporter's Maggie Lee stated "The raging stamina, unrelenting violence, rapid-fire editing and truncated narrative all give one no pause for thought or even breath. By the time the central mystery is revealed in a nice twist, it gets swallowed in the messy, anti-climactic end." Peter Bradshaw of The Guardian added "This noirish South Korean gangster film is a deafening explosion of energy, gruesome violence and chaos that, despite its implausibilities, has brashness and style... Perhaps The Yellow Sea does not really hang together, and, yes, it could perhaps have lost 30 minutes. But its power and bite-strength are impressive." Philip Kemp of GamesRadar+ gave the film two stars out of five, stating "At nearly two and a half hours long, The Yellow Sea is overkill in every sense." Michael Atkinson of The Village Voice mentioned "If anything, Na's film is too much of a good thing, exceeding credibility too often (the punching-bag hero is far too lucky - good and bad - and absorbs a hilarious amount of punishment) in its pursuit of despairing violence. But that's the Korean way, and Na nails down the bottom feeder realism while slouching toward video-game hyperbole".

== Awards and nominations ==
Year	Award	Category	Recipients	Result
2011	48th Grand Bell Awards	Best Film	The Yellow Sea	Nominated
2011	48th Grand Bell Awards	Best Director	Na Hong-jin	Nominated
2011	48th Grand Bell Awards	Best Actor	Kim Yoon-seok	Nominated
2011	48th Grand Bell Awards	Best Supporting Actor	Jo Sung-ha	Won
2011	48th Grand Bell Awards	Best Cinematography	Lee Sung-jae	Nominated
2011	48th Grand Bell Awards	Best Editing	Kim Sun-min	Nominated
2011	48th Grand Bell Awards	Best Art Direction	Lee Hoo-gyoun	Nominated
2011	48th Grand Bell Awards	Best Lighting	Hwang Soon-wook	Nominated
2011	48th Grand Bell Awards	Best Costume Design	Chae Kyung-hwa	Won
2011	48th Grand Bell Awards	Best Visual Effects	Kim Tae-hun, Jeong Jae-hun	Nominated
2011	48th Grand Bell Awards	Best Sound Effects	Choi Tae-young	Nominated
2011	32nd Blue Dragon Film Awards	Best Actor	Kim Yoon-seok	Nominated
2011	32nd Blue Dragon Film Awards	Best Supporting Actor	Jo Sung-ha	Nominated
2011	32nd Blue Dragon Film Awards	Best Cinematography	Lee Sung-jae	Nominated
2011	32nd Blue Dragon Film Awards	Best Art Direction	Lee Hoo-gyoun	Nominated
2011	32nd Blue Dragon Film Awards	Best Lighting	Hwang Soon-wook	Won
2011	47th Baeksang Arts Awards	Best Film	The Yellow Sea	Nominated
2011	47th Baeksang Arts Awards	Best Director	Na Hong-jin	Nominated
2011	47th Baeksang Arts Awards	Best Actor	Ha Jung-woo	Won
2011	5th Asian Film Awards	Best Director	Na Hong-jin	Nominated
2011	5th Asian Film Awards	Best Actor	Ha Jung-woo	Won
2011	5th Asian Film Awards	Best Production Designer	Lee Hwo-kyoung	Nominated
2011	5th Asian Film Awards	Best Composer	Jang Young-gyu and Lee Byung-hoon	Nominated
2011	5th Asia Pacific Screen Awards	Achievement in Directing	Na Hong-jin	Nominated
2011	64th Cannes Film Festival	Un Certain Regard	Na Hong-jin	Nominated
2011	31st Korean Association of Film Critics Awards	Best Actor	Ha Jung-woo	Won
2011	20th Buil Film Awards	Best Actor	Ha Jung-woo	Nominated
2011	15th Puchon International Fantastic Film Festival	Best Director	Na Hong-jin	Won
2011	15th Puchon International Fantastic Film Festival	Best of Puchon	Na Hong-jin	Nominated
2011	Chicago International Film Festival	Gold Hugo	Na Hong-jin	Nominated
