= Catholic Priests Association for Justice =

South Korean group

Catholic Priests' Association for Justice (CPAJ; Korean: 천주교정의구현전국사제단; Hanja: 天主敎正義具現全國司祭團) is a South Korean association of Catholic priests, whose aim is to establish justice in Korea.

== History ==
It was established on September 26, 1974 as an attempt to resist the military regime of Park Chung Hee. The coalition of Catholic priests emphasizes voluntary membership and individual priests' prerogative regarding what information ought to be relayed to their constituents. Since the military regime ended, CPAJ has focused on reunifying Korea, safeguarding the environment, abolishing the National Security Law, and promoting anti-war movements.

In October 2007, CPAJ revealed a corruption scandal at Samsung Group.

On June 30, 2008, CPAJ started participating in a beef protest regarding the import of U.S. beef, which was suspected of being infected with mad cow disease, by celebrating Mass in Seoul and participating in a candlelight demonstration afterwards.
