= Lee Dong-jun =

- Hangul: 이동준
- RR: I Dongjun
- MR: I Tongjun

Lee Dong-jun, Lee Dong-joon or Lee Dong-june may refer to:

- Lee Dong-jun (basketball) (born Daniel Sandrin, 1980), American-born South Korean basketball player
- Lee Dong-jun (footballer) (born 1997), South Korean footballer
- Lee Dong-june (born 1967), South Korean composer
