= Jang Joon-hwan =

South Korean film director (born 1970)

- 장준환
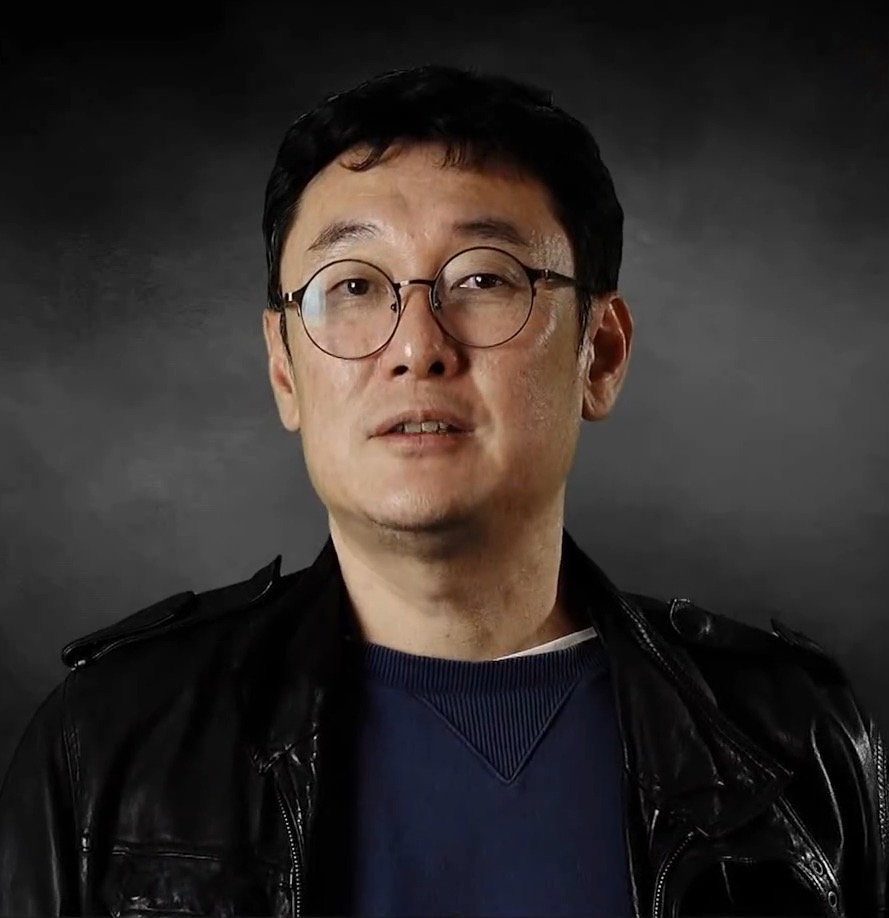
- Jang in 2017
- Born: January 18, 1970 (age 56); Jeonju, South Korea
- Education: Sungkyunkwan University
- Occupations: Film director; screenwriter
- Years active: 1994–present
- Spouse: Moon So-ri (m. 2006)
- Children: 1

Korean name
- Hangul: 장준환
- Hanja: 張駿桓
- RR: Jang Junhwan
- MR: Chang Chunhwan

Jang Joon-hwan (Korean: 장준환; born January 18, 1970) is a South Korean film director. He is known for his science fiction film Save the Green Planet! (2003), earning him Best Director at the 4th Busan Film Critics Awards, and the Special Silver St. George for Best Director at the 25th Moscow International Film Festival.

== Early life and education ==
Jang enrolled at Sungkyunkwan University as an English literature major after failing to gain admission to the physics department. He described his major as profound but difficult to grasp. During his senior year of college, Jang experienced a period of intense frustration and sought an outlet by joining a university film club. This experience fostered a meaningful interest in the medium, leading him to enroll in the Korean Academy of Film Arts in 1994, where he began his formal relationship with filmmaking.

Jang's first directing job was on the 1994 short film 2001 Imagine. It was his graduation project, completed as part of the Korean Academy of Film Arts' one-year curriculum, originated from a single, persistent image: a man delusional enough to believe he is a giant confessing this to his mother. By incorporating themes involving John Lennon and Yoko Ono, he developed this concept into a short film that garnered critical acclaim at the Clermont-Ferrand, San Francisco, and Vancouver Film Festivals.

== Career ==
=== Career beginning ===
After graduating in 1995, Jang spent two years as a teaching assistant at the academy. While the role provided a modest salary, he eventually found the work stagnant. During this period, he served as a cinematographer for Ryoo Seung-wan's short film Transmutated Head (1996). His creative focus during this time shifted toward Fart Man, an ambitious script about a man whose flatulence grants him destructive superpowers. Although it became his primary candidate for a debut feature, the project was ultimately shelved due to its requirement for a massive production scale.

In 1997, after concluding his role as a teaching assistant, Jang transitioned into the professional film industry after being recruited by Bong Joon-ho to join the production team for Park Ki-yong's Motel Cactus. This experience was pivotal for Jang, allowing him to establish professional networks. Several individuals he collaborated with on Motel Cactus would later become key creative partners for his debut feature, Save the Green Planet!: producer Cha Seung-jae (then CEO of Uno Film), cinematographer Hong Kyung-pyo, and assistant director Kim Jong-hoon.

=== Feature-length film debut ===
After a brief, three-month stint working on a screenwriting project in Canada in 1999, he returned to Korea to focus on his directorial debut. In the spring of 2000, he conceived the premise for what would become his feature-length debut, Save the Green Planet! (2003). The film is widely regarded as one of the most unique and original works in the history of Korean cinema. Upon its release, it earned critical acclaim, securing Jang the Best Director award at the 4th Busan Film Critics Awards, and the Special Silver St. George for Best Director at the 25th Moscow International Film Festival.

He directed two more short films Hair (2004), and Love for Sale (2010, as part of the omnibus Camellia, about the past, present and future of the city Busan). Then, in 2013, Jang's long-awaited second feature film was released, a revenge thriller titled Hwayi: A Monster Boy.

In 2017, he directed a political thriller film titled 1987: When the Day Comes. The film was a critical and commercial success, and won Best Director and Best Film at the 9th KOFRA Film Awards, as well as Best Film at the 39th Blue Dragon Film Awards.

=== Bugonia ===
In May 2020, Jang was set to direct an English-language remake of his film Save the Green Planet!, with Will Tracy adapting the screenplay. However, Jang later stepped down as director due to health problems, although he remained an executive producer on the project. By February 2024, it was revealed that Yorgos Lanthimos would replace Jang as director. By October 2024, the film was retitled Bugonia, prior to being scheduled for a limited release in the United States on October 24, 2025, before a wide release on October 31.

== Personal life ==
Jang married actress Moon So-ri on December 24, 2006.

== Filmography ==
Film credits of Jang
Year	Title		Role	Notes	Ref.
Year	English	Korean	Role	Notes	Ref.
1994	Incoherence	지리멸렬	Lighting	Short film	
1994	2001 Imagine	2001 이매진	Director, Screenplay, Cast	Short film	
1994	Sounds from Heaven and Earth	하늘소리 땅소리	Cinematography	Short film	
1994	The Love of a Grape Seed	포도 씨앗의 사랑	Cinematography	Short film	
1996	Boong-boong		Cinematography	Short film	
1996	Transmutated Head	변질헤드	Cinematography	Short film	
1997	Motel Cactus	모텔 선인장	Assistant Director		
1999	Phantom: the Submarine	유령	Screenplay		
2003	Save the Green Planet!	지구를 지켜라!	Director, Screenplay		
2004	Hair	털	Director, Screenplay	Short film	
2006	Two or Three Things I Know about Kim Ki-young	감독들, 김기영을 말하다	Cast	Documentary	
2010	Love for Sale (segment from Camellia)	카멜리아	Director	Omnibus film	
2012	Waiting for Jang Joon-hwan	장준환을 기다리며	Cameo	Short film	
2013	Hwayi: A Monster Boy	화이	Director		
2017	1987: When the Day Comes	1987	Director		
2017	The Running Actress	여배우는 오늘도	Actor		
2025	Bugonia		Executive producer		

== Awards and nominations ==
Awards and nominations
Award	Year	Category	Recipient(s)	Result	Ref.
8th AACTA Awards	2018	Best Asian Film	1987: When the Day Comes	Nominated	
9th Annual Film of the Year Awards	2018	Best Picture	1987: When the Day Comes	Won	
9th Annual Film of the Year Awards	2018	Best Director	1987: When the Day Comes	Won	
54th Baeksang Arts Awards		Grand Prize (Daesang)	1987: When the Day Comes	Won	
54th Baeksang Arts Awards		Best Film	1987: When the Day Comes	Nominated	
54th Baeksang Arts Awards		Best Director	1987: When the Day Comes	Nominated	
27th Buil Film Awards		Best Film	1987: When the Day Comes	Nominated	
27th Buil Film Awards		Best Director	1987: When the Day Comes	Nominated	
24th Blue Dragon Film Awards	2003	Best New Director	Jang Joon-hwan	Won	
39th Blue Dragon Film Awards	2018	Best Film	1987: When the Day Comes	Won	
39th Blue Dragon Film Awards	2018	Best Director	1987: When the Day Comes	Nominated	
4th Busan Film Critics Association Awards	2003	Best New Director	Jang Joon-hwan	Won	
22nd Brussels International Fantastic Film Festival	2004	Golden Crow Statue	Save the Green Planet!	Won	
CinemAsia Film Festival	2018	Best Director	1987: When the Day Comes	Won	
11th Chunsa Film Awards	2003	Best New Director	Jang Joon-hwan	Won	
23rd Chunsa Film Art Awards	2018	Best Director	1987: When the Day Comes	Nominated	
18th Director's Cut Awards	2018	Director of the Year Award	1987: When the Day Comes	Won	
18th Director's Cut Awards	2018	Special Mention of the Year	1987: When the Day Comes	Won	
38th Golden Cinematography Awards	2018	Best Picture Award	1987: When the Day Comes	Won	
38th Golden Cinematography Awards	2018	Best Director	1987: When the Day Comes	Won	
40th Grand Bell Awards	2003	Best New Director	Save the Green Planet!	Won	
2nd Korea Film Awards	2003	Best New Director	Save the Green Planet!	Won	
55th Grand Bell Awards		Best Film	1987: When the Day Comes	Nominated	
55th Grand Bell Awards		Best Director	1987: When the Day Comes	Won	
9th KOFRA Film Awards	2018	Best Film	1987: When the Day Comes	Won	
9th KOFRA Film Awards	2018	Best Director	1987: When the Day Comes	Won	
38th Korean Association of Film Critics Awards	2018	Best Film	1987: When the Day Comes	Won	
38th Korean Association of Film Critics Awards	2018	Top 11 Films	1987: When the Day Comes	Won	
5th Korean Film Producers Association Awards	2018	Best Film	1987: When the Day Comes	Won	
3rd Marie Claire Film Festival	2014	Pioneer Award	Jang Joon-hwan	Won	
25th Moscow International Film Festival	2003	Best Director	Save the Green Planet!	Won	
13th Paris Korean Film Festival	2018	Best Feature Film	1987: When the Day Comes	Won	
36th Today's Young Artist Award	2004	Award	Jang Joon-hwan	Won	
2nd The Seoul Awards	2018	Best Film	1987: When the Day Comes	Nominated	
18th Udine Far East Film Festival	2018	Audience Award	1987: When the Day Comes	Won	
18th Udine Far East Film Festival	2018	Black Dragon Audience Award	1987: When the Day Comes	Won	

== See also ==
- List of Korean film directors
- Cinema of Korea
