= Song Hye-kyo filmography =

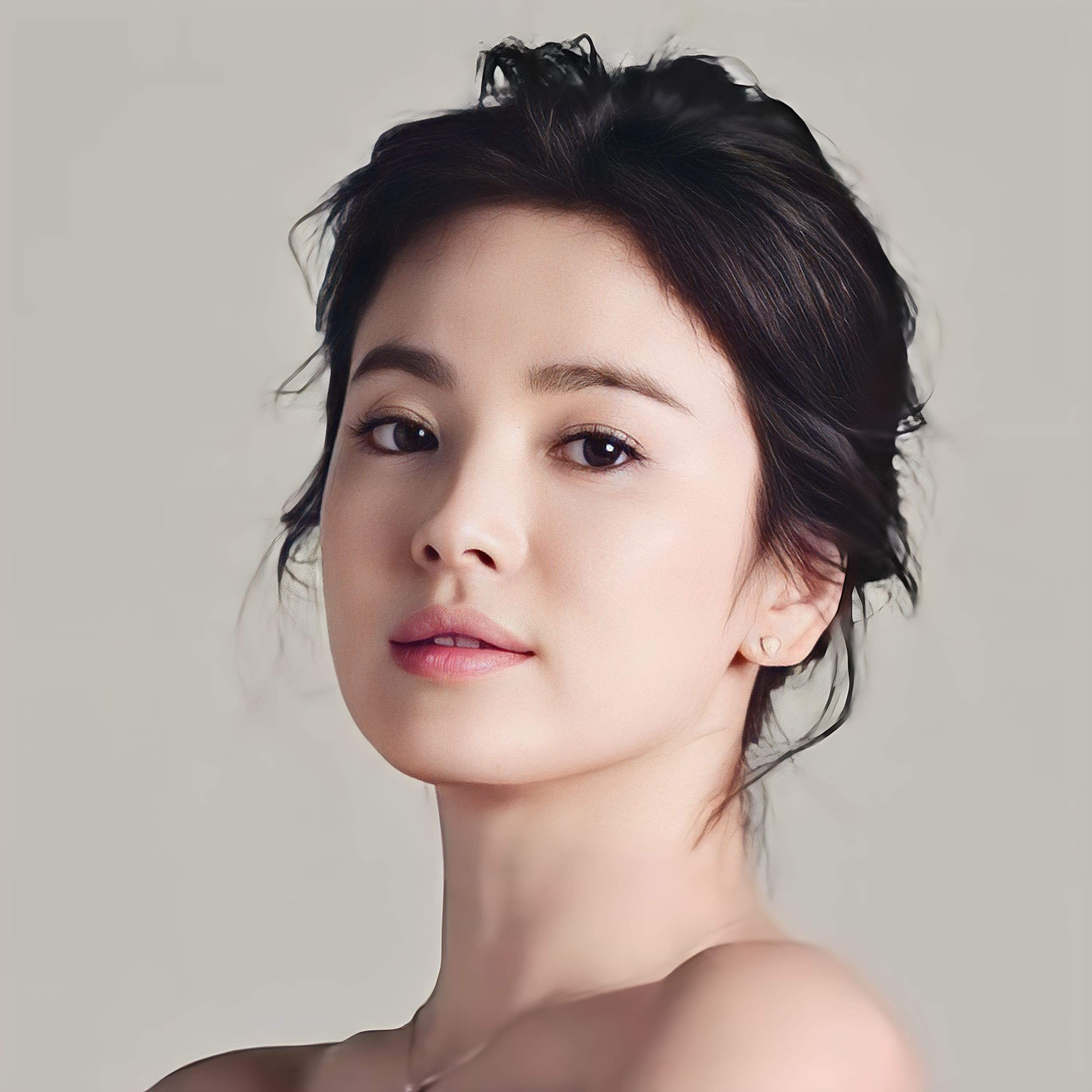
- Song in 2014
- Film: 12
- Television series: 28
- Television show: 8
- Music videos: 3

Song Hye-kyo is a South Korean actress. She gained international popularity through her leading roles in the television dramas Autumn in My Heart (2000), All In (2003), Full House (2004), That Winter, the Wind Blows (2013), Descendants of the Sun (2016), Encounter (2018–2019), and The Glory (2022–2023). Her film work includes Hwang Jin Yi (2007), The Grandmaster (2013), My Brilliant Life (2014), and Dark Nuns (2025).

== Film ==
Year	Title	Role	Notes	Ref.
2005	My Girl and I	Bae Su-eun		
2007	Hwang Jin Yi	Hwang Jin-yi		
2008	Make Yourself at Home	Sookhy	Independent film	
2010	Camellia	Bo-ra	Segment: "Love for Sale"	
2011	Countdown	Pretty girl	Special appearance	
2011	A Reason to Live	Da-hye		
2013	The Grandmaster	Zhang Yongcheng		
2014	My Brilliant Life	Choi Mi-ra		
2014	The Crossing: Part 1	Zhou Yunfen		
2015	The Queens	Annie		
2015	The Crossing: Part 2	Zhou Yunfen		
2025	Dark Nuns	Sister Junia / Kang Seong-Ae		

== Television series ==
Year	Title	Role	Notes	Ref.
1995	New Generation Report: Adults Don't Know		Bit part	
1996–1997	First Love	Student		
1997	Happy Morning	Oh Ye-boon		
1997	Beautiful Face		Bit part	
1997	70-minute Drama – "When They Met"		Extra	
1997	One of a Pair		Extra	
1997–1998	Wedding Dress	Granddaughter		
1998–1999	Six Siblings	Choi Eun-shil		
1998–2000	Soonpoong Clinic	Oh Hye-kyo		
1998	White Nights 3.98	young Hong Jung-yeon		
1998	Deadly Eyes	Oh Jung-ah		
1998–1999	How Am I?	Ye-rin		
1999–2000	Marching	Song Hye-kyo		
1999–2000	Sweet Bride	Kim Young-hee		
2000	Autumn in My Heart	Yoon / Choi Eun-seo		
2001	Hotelier	Kim Yoon-hee		
2001	Guardian Angel	Jung Da-so		
2003	All In	Min Su-yeon / Angela		
2004	Sunlight Pours Down	Ji Yeon-woo		
2004	Full House	Han Ji-eun		
2008	Worlds Within	Joo Joon-young		
2013	That Winter, the Wind Blows	Oh Young		
2016	Descendants of the Sun	Kang Mo-yeon		
2018–2019	Encounter	Cha Soo-hyun		
2021–2022	Now, We Are Breaking Up	Ha Young-eun		
2022–2023	The Glory	Moon Dong-eun		
2025	Genie, Make a Wish	Jinniya	Cameo (episode 8, 10)	
TBA	Show Business †	Min-Ja		

== Television shows ==
Year	Title	Role	Notes	Ref.
1998	Inkigayo Live 20	Host	with Park Soo-hong	
1999–2000	Our Happy Saturday	Host		
2000	Music Bank	Host	with Lee Hwi-jae	
2001	Mnet KM Music Festival	Host	with Cha Tae-hyun	
2007	She's Olive: Song Hye-kyo in Paris	Herself		
2009	Good Morning Panda	Narrator	Documentary	
2016	May, the Children	Narrator	Documentary	
2023	Grandma Is Back	Narrator	Documentary on March First Movement	

== Music video appearances ==
Year	Song Title	Artist
1996	"This Promise"	Kim Soo-keun
2000	"Curious Destiny"	Shin Sung-woo
2000	"Once Upon a Day"	Kim Bum-soo
