= List of awards and nominations received by Song Hye-kyo =

Song Hye-kyo awards and nominations
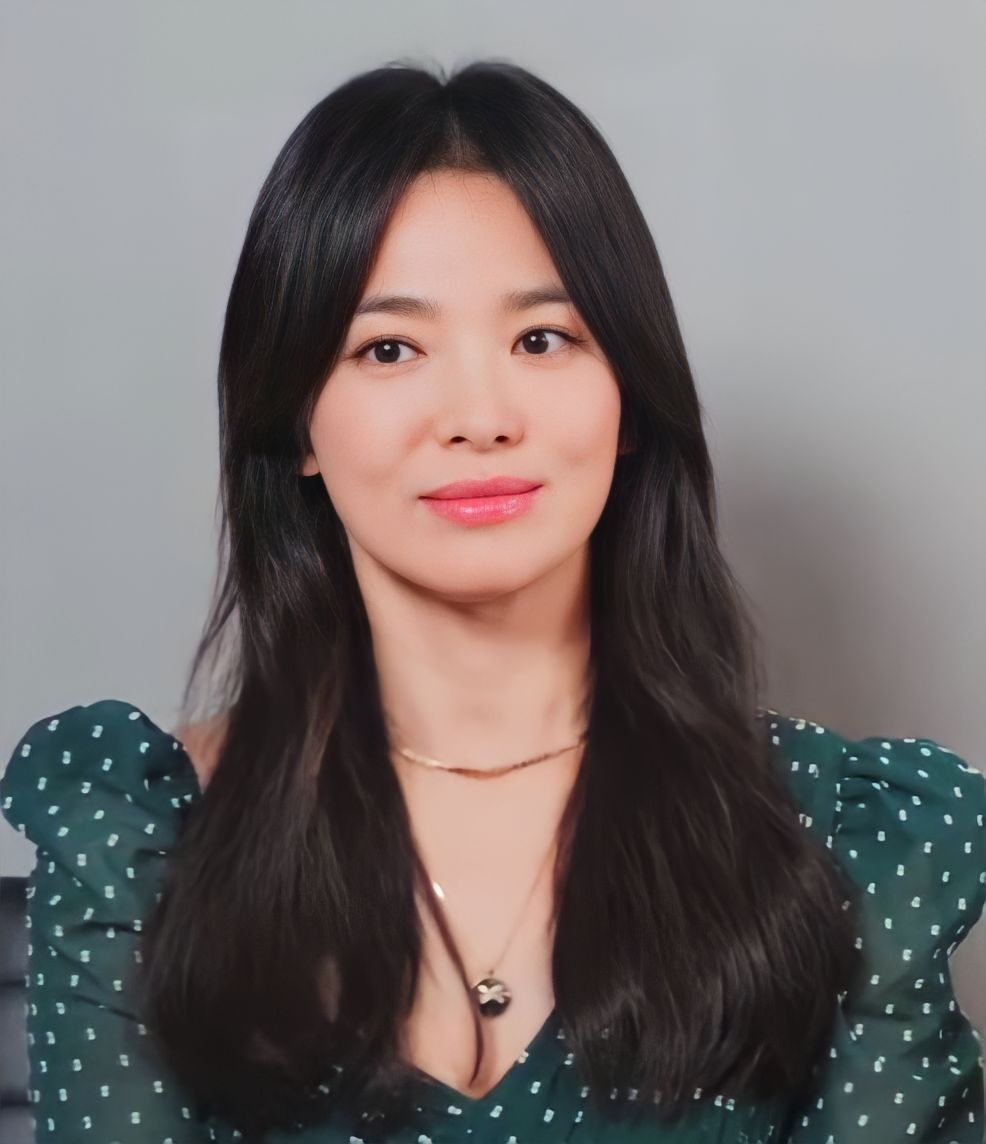
- Song in 2021
Awards and nominations
Award	Wins	Nominations
APAN Star Awards	2	6
Asia Contents Awards & Global OTT Awards	0	1
Baeksang Art Awards	4	8
Blue Dragon Film Awards	0	2
Blue Dragon Series Awards	1	2
Brand Customer Loyalty Awards	2	2
CETV Awards	1	1
DramaFever	1	1
Golden Disk Awards	1	1
Gold Song Awards	1	1
Grand Bell Awards	0	2
KBS Drama Awards	8	12
Korea Film Awards	1	1
Korea Culture and Entertainment Awards	0	0
Korea Drama Awards	0	2
Mnet 20's Choice Awards	0	1
Seoul International Drama Awards	0	1
Visionary Awards	1	1
Women in Film Korea Awards	1	1

Totals (Note: Certain award groups do not simply award one winner. They acknowledge several different recipients, have runners-up, and have third place. Since this is a specific recognition and is different from losing an award, runner-up mentions are considered wins in this award tally. For simplification and to avoid errors, each award in this list has been presumed to have had a prior nomination.)
- Wins: 36
- Nominations: 65

Song Hye-kyo (Korean: 송혜교) has received numerous prestigious awards throughout her career, including multiple Grand Prizes (Daesang). (Note: A Daesang (Korean: 대상), which translates to "Grand Prize", is the highest honor given out at South Korean award ceremonies.) Notable wins include the Daesang at the Blue Dragon Series Awards in 2023 for her work in The Glory, at the KBS Drama Awards in 2016 for Descendants of the Sun, and at the 2nd APAN Star Awards in 2013 for That Winter, the Wind Blows.

In addition, Song has received multiple Best Actress and Top Excellence honors. In 2023, she won Best Actress – Television at the 59th Baeksang Arts Awards for her role in The Glory. Her earlier work earned her Top Excellence Awards at the SBS Drama Awards for All In (2003) and the KBS Drama Awards for Full House (2004). For Descendants of the Sun, she was awarded the Most Popular Actress (TV) and the iQIYI Global Star Award at the 52nd Baeksang Arts Awards in 2016.

Song has also been recognized by the South Korean government. In 2011, she received the Prime Minister's Commendation from the National Tax Service. In 2016, she was awarded the Presidential Commendation at the Korean Popular Culture and Arts Awards. She has been a consistent figure on Forbes Korea's Power Celebrity 40 list, which ranks South Korean celebrities based on their professional achievements, media exposure, and influence. She first appeared on the list at 30th in 2015. Following the success of Descendants of the Sun, her ranking rose significantly to 7th in 2017 and 6th in 2018. She returned to the list in 2022 at 29th and moved up to 25th in 2023, following the global success of The Glory.

== Awards and nominations ==
Award	Year	Category	Nominee / Work	Result	Ref.
APAN Star Awards	2013	Grand Prize (Daesang)	That Winter, the Wind Blows	Won	
APAN Star Awards	2013	Top Excellence Award, Actress	That Winter, the Wind Blows	Nominated	
APAN Star Awards	2016	Grand Prize (Daesang)	Descendants of the Sun	Nominated	
APAN Star Awards	2016	Top Excellence Award, Actress in a Miniseries	Descendants of the Sun	Nominated	
APAN Star Awards	2016	Best Couple (with Song Joong-ki)	Descendants of the Sun	Won	
APAN Star Awards	2023	Top Excellence Award, Actress in a Miniseries	The Glory	Nominated	
Asia Contents Awards & Global OTT Awards	2023	Best Actress	The Glory	Nominated	
Baeksang Arts Awards	2001	Best New Actress – Television	Autumn in My Heart	Nominated	
Baeksang Arts Awards	2001	Most Popular Actress (TV)	Autumn in My Heart	Won	
Baeksang Arts Awards	2005	Best Actress – Television	Full House	Nominated	
Baeksang Arts Awards	2006	Best New Actress – Film	My Girl and I	Nominated	
Baeksang Arts Awards	2013	Best Actress – Television	That Winter, the Wind Blows	Nominated	
Baeksang Arts Awards	2016	Best Actress – Television	Descendants of the Sun	Nominated	
Baeksang Arts Awards	2016	Most Popular Actress (TV)	Descendants of the Sun	Won	
Baeksang Arts Awards	2016	iQiyi Global Star Award	Descendants of the Sun	Won	
Baeksang Arts Awards	2023	Best Actress – Television	The Glory	Won	
Baeksang Arts Awards	2025	Best Actress – Film	Dark Nuns	Nominated	
Blue Dragon Film Awards	2007	Best Actress	Hwang Jin Yi	Nominated	
Blue Dragon Film Awards	2025	Best Actress	Dark Nuns	Nominated	
Blue Dragon Series Awards	2023	Blue Dragon's Choice (Daesang)	The Glory	Won	
Blue Dragon Series Awards	2023	Best Actress	The Glory	Nominated	
Brand Customer Loyalty Awards (Note: Co-organized by the Korean Customers Council and Brand Keys, this event recognizes the most influential brands in society and culture, as determined through consumer research.)	2023	Best Actress – OTT	The Glory	Won	
Brand Customer Loyalty Awards	2025	Female Actress – Film	Dark Nuns	Won	
CETV Awards	2002	Top 10 Asian Entertainers	Song Hye-kyo	Won	
DramaFever Awards	2017	Best Actress	Descendants of the Sun	Won	
Golden Disk Awards	2001	Popular Music Video Award	"Once Upon a Day" by Kim Bum-soo	Won	
Gold Song Awards (Hong Kong)	2001	Top Korean Star	Song Hye-kyo	Won	
Grand Bell Awards	2006	Best New Actress	My Girl and I	Nominated	
Grand Bell Awards	2023	Best Actress in a Series	The Glory	Nominated	
Hundred Flowers Awards	2014	Best Supporting Actress	The Grandmaster	Nominated	
KBS Drama Awards	2000	Top Excellence Award, Actress	Autumn in My Heart	Nominated	
KBS Drama Awards	2000	Photogenic Award, Actress	Autumn in My Heart	Won	
KBS Drama Awards	2000	Popularity Award, Actress	Autumn in My Heart	Won	
KBS Drama Awards	2004	Top Excellence Award, Actress	Full House	Won	
KBS Drama Awards	2004	Popularity Award, Actress	Full House	Won	
KBS Drama Awards	2004	Best Couple (with Rain)	Full House	Won	
KBS Drama Awards	2008	Excellence Award, Actress in a Miniseries	Worlds Within	Nominated	
KBS Drama Awards	2016	Grand Prize (Daesang) (Note: Co-won with Song Joong-ki)	Descendants of the Sun	Won	
KBS Drama Awards	2016	Top Excellence Award, Actress	Descendants of the Sun	Nominated	
KBS Drama Awards	2016	Excellence Award, Actress in a Miniseries	Descendants of the Sun	Nominated	
KBS Drama Awards	2016	Best Couple (with Song Joong-ki)	Descendants of the Sun	Won	
KBS Drama Awards	2016	Asia Best Couple (with Song Joong-ki)	Descendants of the Sun	Won	
Korea Drama Awards	2013	Grand Prize (Daesang)	That Winter, the Wind Blows	Nominated	
Korea Drama Awards	2023	Grand Prize (Daesang)	The Glory	Nominated	
Korean Film Awards	2007	Best New Actress	Hwang Jin Yi	Won	
Korean Fashion Photographers Association	2022	Photogenic Cup	Song Hye-kyo	Won	
Mnet 20's Choice Awards	2013	20's Drama Star-Female	That Winter, the Wind Blows	Nominated	
SBS Drama Awards	1998	Best New Actress in a Sitcom	Soonpoong Clinic, How Am I?	Won	
SBS Drama Awards	2001	Top 10 Stars	Guardian Angel	Won	
SBS Drama Awards	2001	SBSi Award	Guardian Angel	Won	
SBS Drama Awards	2003	Top Excellence Award, Actress	All In	Won	
SBS Drama Awards	2003	Top 10 Stars	All In	Won	
SBS Drama Awards	2004	Top Excellence Award, Actress	Sunlight Pours Down	Nominated	
SBS Drama Awards	2004	Excellence Award, Actress in Drama Special	Sunlight Pours Down	Nominated	
SBS Drama Awards	2013	Top Excellence Award, Actress in a Miniseries	That Winter, the Wind Blows	Won	
SBS Drama Awards	2013	Top 10 Stars	That Winter, the Wind Blows	Won	
SBS Drama Awards	2013	Best Couple (with Zo In-sung)	That Winter, the Wind Blows	Nominated	
SBS Drama Awards	2021	Grand Prize (Daesang)	Now, We Are Breaking Up	Nominated	
SBS Drama Awards	2021	Top Excellence Award, Actress in a Miniseries Romance/Comedy Drama	Now, We Are Breaking Up	Nominated	
SBS Drama Awards	2021	Best Couple Award (with Jang Ki-yong)	Now, We Are Breaking Up	Nominated	
Seoul International Drama Awards	2013	Outstanding Korean Actress	That Winter, the Wind Blows	Nominated	
Shanghai New Entertainment Charity Awards	2009	Most Charming Charity Star Award	Song Hye-kyo	Won	
SunKyung Smart Model Contest	1996	Grand Prize (Daesang)	Song Hye-kyo	Won	
Visionary Awards (Note: Visionary Awards, which started in 2020, selects and awards people who lead roles in the Korean entertainment industry. It highlights the meaning and achievements of a person whose chosen trend keywords penetrated the entertainment industry, including broadcasting, movies, music, and performances, and presents the next vision of the cultural sector with outstanding achievements and influence.)	2024	2024 Visionary	Song Hye-kyo	Won	
Women in Film Korea Awards	2011	Best Actress	A Reason to Live	Won	

== State honors ==
Name of country, year given, and name of honor
Country	Organization	Year	Honor or Award	Ref.
South Korea	Korean Popular Culture and Arts Awards (Note: Honors are given at the Korean Popular Culture and Arts Awards, arranged by the Korea Creative Content Agency and hosted by the Ministry of Culture, Sports and Tourism. They are awarded to those who have contributed to the arts and South Korea's pop culture.)	2016	Presidential Commendation	
South Korea	National Tax Service (Note: Honors are given at the Taxpayers' Day ceremony.)	2011	Prime Minister's Commendation	

== Listicles ==
Name of publisher, year listed, name of listicle, and placement
Publisher	Year	Listicle	Rank	Ref.
Asia Brand Research Institute	2025	K-Brand Index Actor of the Year	8th	
Cine21	2023	Female Actress to Watch in 2023	4th	
Forbes Korea	2015	Power Celebrity 40	30th	
Forbes Korea	2017	Power Celebrity 40	7th	
Forbes Korea	2018	Power Celebrity 40	6th	
Forbes Korea	2022	Power Celebrity 40	29th	
Forbes Korea	2023	Power Celebrity 40	25th	
Gallup Korea	2024	Best Television Couple of the Past Decade (Note: With Song Joong-ki for Descendants of the Sun (2016))	4th	
Gallup Korea	2023	Television Actor of the Year	4th	
