= Hwang Jini =

Korean kisaeng (1506–1567)

- Born: 1506; Kaesong, Joseon
- Died: 1567 (aged 60–61); Kaesong, Joseon
- Known for: Poetry, Korean dance

Korean name
- Hangul: 황진이
- Hanja: 黃眞伊
- RR: Hwang Jini
- MR: Hwang Chini

Kisaeng name
- Hangul: 명월
- Hanja: 明月
- Lit.: bright moon
- RR: Myeongwol
- MR: Myŏngwŏl

Hwang Jini (Korean: 황진이; Hanja: 黃眞伊; 1506–1567), also spelled Hwang Chini, was one of the most famous kisaeng of the Joseon period. She was also known by her kisaeng name Myŏngwŏl (명월; 明月). She lived during the reign of King Jungjong. She was noted for her exceptional beauty, charming quick wit, extraordinary intellect, and her assertive and independent nature. She has become an almost-mythic figure in modern Korea, inspiring novels, operas, films, and television series.

A crater on Venus, Hwangcini, is named after her.

== Biography ==
Hwang was born around 1506 to a politician's son, Hwang Chinsa (황진사; 黃進士), and a woman named Chin Hyŏn'gŭm (진현금; 陳玄琴) who was either a kisaeng or of cheonmin status. The story goes that her parents met while her mother was doing laundry, but the two could not get married and she became the youngest illegitimate daughter of Hwang. Her father was from a noble family in Kaesong. Legend has it that she was born as the daughter of a blind commoner. It is said that even at the time of liberation in 1945, mineral water came out in the hill of the well at the mouth of Jangdan, where she lived.

She was known for her beauty and her bold personality. As Hwang Chini grew older, many men wanted to marry her. According to legend, one day a coffin was passing in front of her house, but the coffin stopped and refused to move from her house just listening to her read her poetry. She then ran out and stripped off her outer skirt from her hanbok to cover the coffin, and only then did the coffin started to move again. The coffin was said to have carried the body of her lover who was born of a higher class, but due to her lower status the two could not wed and the man died of a broken heart. She then decided to become a kisaeng after losing her lover at the age of 15.

Women during the Joseon period were restricted inside the houses and were considered property. They could not marry whoever they wanted and a daughter born out of wedlock was considered an untouchable. Hwang Chini refused to follow strict social norms for women and chose the life of a kisaeng giving her the freedom to learn not only dance and music, but also art, literature, and poetry - topics that were not normally taught to young women during the time.

Hwang Chini's beauty was famous throughout the Korean peninsula. It is said that her beauty shone even if she was bare faced and had her hair pulled back out of her face. She was clever, witty, and artistic. Many men of the upper class and lower classes alike came from all over just to see her and her performances. Like many other kisaeng at the time, she asked a riddle to the men who came to visit her and only those who passed could interact and talk with her. The riddle would be later known as the Chŏmirigu idubulch'ul (점일이구 이두불출; 點一二口牛頭不出). Legend has it that she gave such difficult riddles in order to meet a man that was just as intellectual as her so that she might one day also get a husband, and the only man who solved it was a yangban by the name of Sŏ Kyŏngdŏk.

== Works ==
=== Hwang Chini's riddle ===
Only a handful of sijo (Korean verse form) and geomungo pieces exist today. They show skilled craftsmanship of words and of musical arrangement. Hwang's sijo often describe the beauty and sites of Kaesong (such as the palace of Manwŏltae and the Pakyon Falls in the Ahobiryong Mountains), the personal tragedy of her lost loves and responses to famous classic Chinese poems and literature (the majority of them reflecting on lost love).

Hwang appears to have been of noble birth. Her sijo are considered the most beautiful ever written. In the following poem, the term Hwang uses for her beloved (어론님) has two meanings, alluding to both her sweetheart and a person who has been frozen by the winter cold. The English phrase "frozen love" may help to illustrate this double entendre in translation.

冬至 섯달 기나긴 밤을 한 허리를 잘라 내어
春風 이불 아래 서리서리 넣었다가
어론님 오신 날 밤이여든 구뷔구뷔 펴리라.

Translation:

I will divide this long November night
and coil by coil
lay it under a warm spring blanket
and roll by roll
when my frozen love returns
I will unfold it to the night.

In this next poem, "Full Moon" is a play on Hwang's kisaeng name: Myŏngwŏl. The poem was written to a man famed for his virtue, Byok Kye Su, whom Hwang infamously seduced. "Green water" is a pun on Byok's name (벽계수 碧溪水).

청산리 벽계수(靑山裏 碧溪水)야 수이 감을 자랑 마라.
일도창해(一到滄海)하면 다시 오기 어려워라.
명월(明月)이 만공산(滿空山)할 제 쉬어간들 어떠리.

Translation:

Green water, do not boast
of your rapid flow from the blue mountains.
It is hard to return
when you've reached the blue sea.
A full moon graces these peaceful hills:
Won't you rest a while?

== In popular culture ==
=== Literature ===
In the late 20th century, Hwang Chini's story began to attract attention from both sides of the Korean divide and feature in a variety of novels, operas, films and television series. Novelizations of her life include a 2002 treatment by North Korean writer Hong Sok-jung (which became the first North Korean novel to win a literary award, the Manhae Prize, in the South) and a 2004 bestseller by South Korean writer Jeon Gyeong-rin.

=== Film and television ===
- Portrayed by Lee Mi-sook in the 1982 MBC TV TV series Hwang Jin Yi
- Portrayed by Chang Mi-hee in the 1986 film Hwang Jin Yi
- Portrayed by Ha Ji-won and Shim Eun-kyung in the 2006 KBS2 TV series Hwang Jini
- Portrayed by Song Hye-kyo and Kim You-jung in the 2007 film Hwang Jin Yi
- Portrayed by Kwon Na-ra in the 2020 KBS2 TV series Royal Secret Agent
- Portrayed by Korean-American Drag Queen HoSo Terra Toma in 2021 on season four of American drag competition series The Boulet Brothers' Dragula

== See also ==
- Korean culture
- Korean dance
- Goryeo

== Sources ==
1. 청산은 내 뜻이오. terms.naver.com (in Korean).
2. Hwang, Chini (2016-12-01). Songs of the Kisaeng: courtesan poetry of the last Korean dynasty. Literature Translation Institute of Korea. ISBN 9788993360417.
