= Kim Min-jong =

South Korean actor and singer (born 1972)

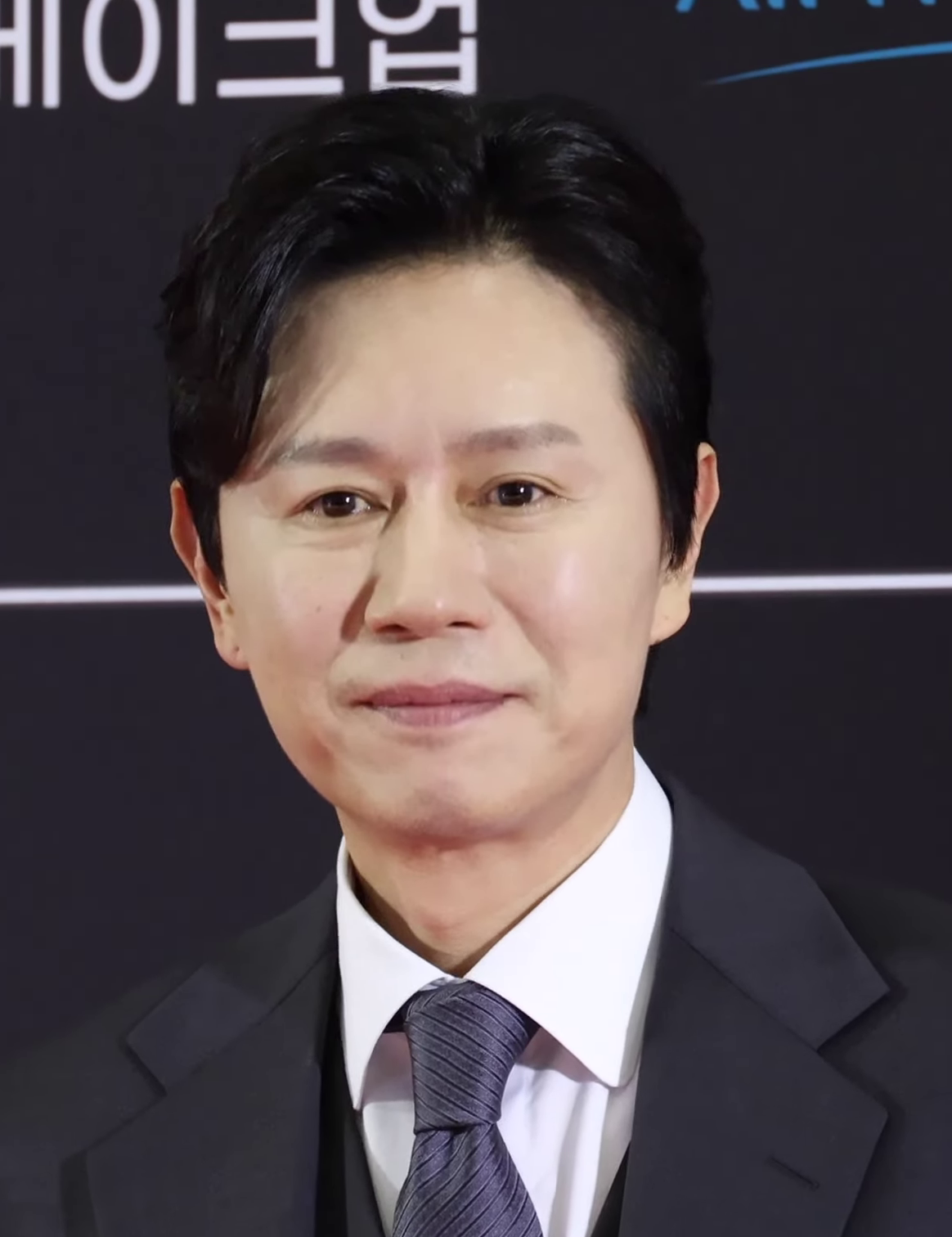
- Kim at Asia Model Festival on October 30, 2025
- Born: 23 March 1972 (age 54); Seoul, South Korea
- Education: Seoul Institute of the Arts (Department of Film)
- Occupations: Actor; singer
- Years active: 1988–present

Korean name
- Hangul: 김민종
- Hanja: 金旼鐘
- RR: Gim Minjong
- MR: Kim Minjong
- Website: minjong.co.kr

Kim Min-jong (born 23 March 1972) is a South Korean actor and singer who was a matinée idol in the 1990s. His recently notable role was in Mrs. Cop (2015) and Mrs. Cop 2 (2016).

== Career ==
Kim Min-jong began his career in Korean film and television in the 1990s as a matinee idol with a gentle, serious image. He starred in popular TV series that kicked off pre-Hallyu Korean drama trends, notably Feelings, A Faraway Country, Mister Q, Secret and Guardian Angel. He also appeared in the films You Know What, It's a Secret, Resistance of Teenagers, and Park Chan-wook's sophomore effort Trio.

In 1992, he and fellow actor Son Ji-chang launched duo The Blue (더 블루). They were playing leads in hit dramas at the time, and enjoyed explosive popularity among women when they debuted with ballads and dance music. They went their separate ways for a while after their first album, but reunited in 1995 for a second project and produced many chart-toppers.

Kim simultaneously launched a successful career as a solo singer. But in 1996, at the height of his popularity, due to the controversy over the similarity of the song "Gwi cheon do ae"(1996) to the Japanese song "Summer Dream"(1987, by Tube), he faced criticism and eventually announced his retirement. He made a comeback two years later with his fourth album.

Though his popularity dimmed in the mid- to late-2000s, Kim remained active in the entertainment industry as an actor, appearing in the film Mr. Butterfly opposite Kim Jung-eun, as well as the romantic comedy/police procedural Woman of Matchless Beauty, Park Jung-geum, risqué cable drama Hyena, period drama The Return of Iljimae, and manhwa adaptation A Man Called God.

Kim had a scene-stealing turn as a North Korean agent who defects to South Korea in 2010 spy series Athena: Goddess of War.

In 2012, his management agency SM Entertainment designated him as a non-executive director of one of its subsidiaries, SM Culture & Contents (SM C&C). That same year, he gained new fans after he starred in A Gentleman's Dignity, which portrayed the humorous love lives of a group of close-knit male friends in their forties. After the series ended, Kim and co-star Jang Dong-gun visited refugees in the Republic of the Congo on a mission trip sponsored by UNICEF and UNHCR's World Food Programme. It was televised on SBS documentary program Hope TV. Then he and another co-star Kim Soo-ro co-hosted the show My Queen on cable channel Story On, in which they travel the world meeting Korean "queens" who've distinguished themselves in their respective fields.

On July 13, 2023, it was announced that Kim left SM Entertainment after 17 years as his exclusive contract has expired.

== Filmography ==
=== Film ===
- Rosebud (2019)
- Along with the Gods: The Last 49 Days (2018)
- The Windmill Palm Grove (2005)
- Romantic Assassins (2003)
- Mr Butterfly (2003)
- Family (2002)
- The Beauty in Dream (2002) (cameo)
- This is Law (2001)
- Saturday 2.00 pm (1998)
- The Last Defense (1997)
- Trio (1997)
- Holiday In Seoul (1997)
- Change (1997)
- The Gate of Destiny (1996)
- Returned Hero Hong Gil-dong (animated, 1995)
- A Hot Roof (1995)
- Coffee, Copy, and a Bloody Nose (1994)
- Orange County (1993)
- A Keeper of the Heart (1992)
- Resistance of Teenagers (1991)
- A Pale Rainy Day (1991)
- Autumn Journey (1991)
- Back To You Once More (1991)
- Only Because You are a Woman (1990)
- Young-shim (1990)
- You Know What, It's a Secret (1990)
- Happiness Does Not Come In Grades (1989)
- My Love, Don Quixote (1989)
- Don Quixote On Asphalt (1988)

=== Television series ===
- Vagabond (SBS, 2019)
- The Miracle We Met (KBS, 2018)
- Mrs. Cop 2 (SBS, 2016)
- Mrs. Cop (SBS, 2015)
- Secret Door (SBS, 2014)
- Reply 1994 (tvN, 2013) (cameo, ep 13)
- I Can Hear Your Voice (SBS, 2013) (cameo, ep 14)
- A Gentleman's Dignity (SBS, 2012)
- Athena: Goddess of War (SBS, 2010)
- A Man Called God (MBC, 2010)
- The Return of Iljimae (MBC, 2009)
- Woman of Matchless Beauty, Park Jung-geum (MBC, 2008)
- Hyena (tvN, 2006)
- Our Stance on How to Treat a Break-up (MBC, 2005)
- Island Village Teacher (SBS, 2004)
- Pearl Necklace (KBS2, 2003)
- Guardian Angel (SBS, 2001)
- Secret (MBC, 2000)
- Did You Ever Love? (KBS1, 1999)
- Ghost (SBS, 1999)
- Mister Q (SBS, 1998)
- Wedding Dress (KBS2, 1997)
- A Faraway Country (KBS2, 1996)
- Legend and Defiance (1996)
- Apartment (MBC, 1995)
- My Son's Woman (MBC, 1994)
- Feelings (KBS2, 1994)
- Passionate Times (SBS, 1993)
- Keep Your Voice Down (SBS, 1991)

=== Television show ===
- Dating Alone (2015)
- Four Sons and One Daughter (2014)
- My Queen (2012)
- Living Together in Empty Room (2017)
- Trio’s Childcare Challenge (2019)
- Korea's Dulle-gil (2022) with Kim Seom-joo

== Discography ==
=== The Blue ===
- The Blue, The First Memories (2009)
- 2nd: The Blue (1995)
- 1st: New Release (1992)

=== Solo albums ===
- 8th: 상처받은 사람들을 위해 (2003)
- 7th: You're My Life (2001)
- Kim Min-jong Best Album (2001)
- 6th: 왜 (2000)
- 5th: 因緣(인연) (1999)
- 4th: 愛(애) (1998)
- 3rd: 귀천도애 (1996)
- 2nd: 하늘아래서 (1993)
- 1st: 사랑 이별이야기 (1992)

=== Soundtrack contributions ===
- Beautiful Pain (2012 New Ver.) (from A Gentleman's Dignity OST, 2012)
- 있을게 (from Guardian Angel OST, 2001)

== Awards ==
- 2012 SBS Drama Awards: Special Acting Award, Actor in a Weekend/Serial Drama (A Gentleman's Dignity)
- 2012 SBS Drama Awards: Best Couple Award with Yoon Jin-yi (A Gentleman's Dignity)
- 2001 SBS Drama Awards: Excellence Award, Actor (Guardian Angel)
- 2001 SBS Drama Awards: Top 10 Stars (Guardian Angel)
- 2001 SBS Song Festival: Pop Ballad Award
- 2000 SBS Drama Awards: Big Star Award (Ghost)
- 1999 Jogye Order 포교대상 원력상
- 1999 KBS Song Festival: Vocalist/Artist of the Year
- 1998 KBS Song Festival: Vocalist/Artist of the Year
- 1998 SBS Drama Awards: Top Excellence Award, Actor (Mister Q)
- 1996 Blue Dragon Film Awards: Popular Star Award (The Gate of Destiny)
