= Trio's Childcare Challenge =

South Korean television show

- Promotional poster
- Hangul: 아이를 위한 나라는 있다
- RR: Aireul wihan naraneun itda
- MR: Airŭl wihan naranŭn itta
- Genre: Reality show
- Written by: Vanderessa; Lee Min-ju; Ji Sung-mi; Kim Hwa-yeon; Lee Da-young; Jo Min-kyung; Lee Yeon-ju
- Starring: Seo Jang-hoon; Kim Gu-ra; Kim Min-jong; Hwang Chi-yeul
- Country of origin: South Korea
- Original language: Korean
- No. of seasons: 1
- No. of episodes: 18

Production
- Executive producer: Gwon Yong-taek
- Producer: Shin Mi-jin
- Production location: South Korea
- Running time: 80 minutes

Original release
- Network: KBS2
- Release: July 6 – November 9, 2019

Trio's Childcare Challenge (Korean: 아이를 위한 나라는 있다) is a South Korean reality show program on KBS 2 starring Seo Jang-hoon, Kim Gu-ra, Kim Min-jong and Hwang Chi-yeul. The show airs on KBS 2 starting from July 6, 2019. It is distributed and syndicated by KBS every Saturday at 22:45 (KST). The program also airs on KBS World with English subtitles.

== Casts ==
Name	Episode
Seo Jang-hoon	1 - present
Kim Gu-ra	1 - present
Kim Min-jong	1 - present
Hwang Chi-yeul	5 - present

== Synopsis ==
Every episode, the hosts will be taking care of different children for the children's busy parents.

== Ratings ==
- In the ratings below, the highest rating for the show will be in red, and the lowest rating for the show will be in blue each year.
- Ratings listed below are the individual corner ratings of Trio's Childcare Challenge. (Note: Individual corner ratings do not include commercial time, which regular ratings include.)

Ep.	Broadcast date	AGB Nielsen (Nationwide)	
Ep.	Broadcast date	Part 1	Part 2
1	July 6, 2019	2.8%	2.1%
2	July 13, 2019	2.4%	—N/a
3	July 20, 2019	3.0%	2.2%
4	July 27, 2019	2.8%	2.4%
5	August 10, 2019	3.1%	3.5%
6	August 17, 2019	2.2%	2.1%
7	August 24, 2019	2.2%	2.7%
8	August 31, 2019	1.7%	—N/a
9	September 7, 2019	1.9%	—N/a
10	September 14, 2019	1.5%	—N/a
11	September 21, 2019	1.7%	1.3%
12	September 28, 2019	1.4%	1.4%
13	October 5, 2019	1.5%	1.3%
14	October 12, 2019	1.6%	1.1%
15	October 19, 2019	2.2%	1.5%
16	October 26, 2019	—N/a	1.5%
17	November 2, 2019	2.3%	
18	November 9, 2019	1.9%	1.3%
