= Kim Gu-ra =

South Korean entertainer (born 1970)

Kim Gu-ra 김구라
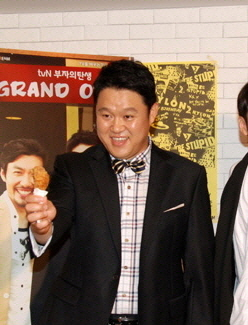
- Kim on July 13, 2011
- Born: Kim Hyeon-dong (김현동); October 3, 1970 (age 56); Galsan-dong, Bupyeong-gu, Incheon, South Korea
- Notable work: Radio Star, Line Up, Quiz that Changes the World, Intimate Note, King of Mask Singer, My Little Television
- Children: 2 including MC Gree (son)

Comedy career
- Years active: 1993–present
- Medium: television
- Genre: Situation comedy

Korean name
- Hangul: 김현동
- Hanja: 金賢東
- RR: Gim Hyeondong
- MR: Kim Hyŏndong

Stage name
- Hangul: 김구라
- Hanja: 金口羅
- RR: Gim Gura
- MR: Kim Kura

Kim Hyeon-dong (Korean: 김현동, born October 3, 1970), better known as his stage name Kim Gu-ra (김구라) is a South Korean MC, comedian and radio host.

== Career ==
He first appeared on television in the 1990s in comedy shows and comedy skits. Kim was blasted by the Korean public for harshly criticizing boy band H.O.T. member Moon Hee Jun of his musical style, fashion, and hairstyle on his radio show, yet he was paired with Moon when hosting shows. He was also well known for being one of the main MCs of popular Korean variety show Line Up. He was also one of the main MC'S of popular South Korean shows Quiz that Changes the World, Radio Star and The Moments of Truth Korea. He is well known for his blunt yet humorous attitude when hosting TV shows. He has also appeared as a guest on A Table for the Gods.

His son, Kim Dong-hyeon, also appeared on television in Bungeoppang and other shows as well, most notably Star Golden Bell and also in the MBC drama 'May Queen' as the younger version of the main female character's older (step) brother.

In April 2012, Kim quit the eight entertainment programmes he hosted, following a controversy over a 2002 audio clip from a radio programme, where he likened comfort women to prostitutes.

He returned to television in January 2013, by hosting the variety show Men's Stuff with Lee Sang-min on cable channel JTBC.

== Filmography ==
=== Television shows ===
- 2015: Home Food Rescue
- Radio Star
- Trio’s Childcare Challenge
- Those Who Cross the Line (Season 1)
- 2021: Leader's Love Host
- Time Out (2021 - Host)
- God and the Battle ( 2022)
- Back to the Ground (2022)
- Gura Kim's Latte 9 (2022, Host)
- The Hall of Yesul (2022)
- Four Like (2022) - Host
- Because It's My First New House (2022); Host
- Truth World (2023); Host
- One Meal After Work (2023); Host
- Run Away (2023); Host
- Big Brother Era (2023); Regular Member

=== Web shows ===
- Between Marriage and Divorce (2022, Host)

=== Films ===
Year	Title	Role
2008	Baby and I	cameo
2009	Handphone	Radio DJ
2011	Neighboring Death Village	

== Accolades ==
=== Awards and nominations ===
Year presented, name of the award ceremony, category, nominated work, and the result of the nomination
Year	Award	Category	Nominated work	Result	Ref.
2011	SBS Entertainment Awards	Netizen Popularity Award	Bungeo-ppang	Nominated	
2020	2020 MBC Entertainment Awards	Grand Prize (Daesang)	Radio Star	Nominated	
2021	2021 SBS Entertainment Awards	Entertainer of the Year Award	Same Bed, Different Dreams 2: You Are My Destiny	Won	
2022	58th Baeksang Arts Awards	Best Male Variety Performer	Kim Gu-ra	Nominated	
2022	2022 KBS Entertainment Awards	Digital Content Award	Studio K's Gu-ra Chul Season 3	Won	
2022	2022 MBC Entertainment Awards	Entertainer of the Year Award	Kim Gu-ra	Won	

=== Listicles ===
Name of publisher, year listed, name of listicle, and placement
Publisher	Year	Listicle	Placement	Ref.
Forbes	2016	Korea Power Celebrity	25th	
