= Hwang Jini (TV series) =

- Promotional poster
- Genre: Historical; Drama; Romance
- Based on: I, Hwang Jini by Kim Takhwan
- Written by: Yoon Sun-joo
- Directed by: Kim Chul-kyu
- Starring: Ha Ji-won; Kim Young-ae; Wang Bit-na; Kim Jaewon; Ryu Tae-joon; Jang Keun-suk
- Composers: Lee Im-woo; Eom Gi-yeop; Seo Woong-seok
- Country of origin: South Korea
- Original language: Korean
- No. of episodes: 24

Production
- Producer: Lee Sung-joo
- Running time: 64 minutes on Wednesdays and Thursdays at 21:55 (KST)
- Production companies: Olive9; KBS Media

Original release
- Network: KBS2
- Release: October 11 – December 28, 2006

Hwang Jini (Korean: 황진이; Hanja: 黃眞伊) is a Korean drama broadcast on KBS2 in 2006. The series was based on the tumultuous life of Hwang Jini, who lived in 16th-century Joseon and became the most famous gisaeng in Korean history. Lead actress Ha Ji-won won the Grand Prize (Daesang) at the 2006 KBS Drama Awards for her performance.

The series was popular in the ratings, giving rise to a boom in gisaeng-themed entertainment—musicals, TV dramas, films, even cartoons.

== Synopsis ==
Hwang Jini is the illegitimate child of a nobleman and Hyun Geum, a blind gisaeng. A gisaeng is a singer, dancer and hostess who lives a life catering to the whims of the yangban elite. Fearing that her young daughter will follow in her footsteps and determined that she should become more than a mere plaything for men, Hyun Geum sends Jini to a remote mountain temple to be cared for by an old monk. But one day, the seven-year-old Jini slips away from the temple and comes across a gisaeng performance, and is drawn to her destiny. Enraptured by the beauty of their singing and dancing, Jini runs away and enters the gibang, or gisaeng house, where she meets her mother for the first time. They discover that she displays an outstanding talent for dancing and playing the geomungo. From that day on, Jini trains to become Joseon's top gisaeng. She studies under Im Baek-moo, one of the best court dancers in the kingdom and a harsh and manipulative teacher.

Jini then falls in love with Kim Eun-ho, son of a powerful nobleman, but his parents refuse to accept the relationship due to the difference in their social status. Jini's first love ends in tragedy when in a futile attempt to elope with her, Eun-ho catches pneumonia and dies.

Unable to forget Eun-ho, Jini no longer has any desire to dance; for the next five years, she spends her days making music and conversation with the middle class (becoming enormously wealthy in the process) and her nights drowning herself in misery and alcohol. While drunk, she decides to kill herself, but the poet Kim Jung-han saves her. Thus, Jini begins a troubled love affair with Jung-han. Meanwhile, she continually rejects Byuk Kye-soo, a royal relative who is obsessed with her, and faces off against Bu-yong, her rival in dancing and love. At Jini's side in times of need is her devoted bodyguard Yi-saeng. Jini later finds out that Baek-moo's scheming had a hand in Eun-ho's death, and jealousy and bitterness build between the two as they prepare for what turns out to be a fateful performance of the crane dance.

In an age when women were treated as if they were invisible, Hwang Jini becomes a celebrated gisaeng-singer-dancer-poet of the 16th century. Her beauty, wit and intellect propels her from obscurity into the company of Joseon's most powerful aristocrats, eventually winning the acclaim of King Jungjong and his court.

== Cast ==
=== Main ===
- Ha Ji-won as Hwang Jini
  - Shim Eun-kyung as young Hwang Jini
- Kim Young-ae as Im Baek-moo
- Wang Bit-na as Bu-yong
- Kim Jaewon as Kim Jung-han
- Ryu Tae-joon as Byuk Kye-soo
- Jang Keun-suk as Kim Eun-ho
- Jeon Mi-seon as Jin Hyun-geum, Hwang Jini's mother
- Lee Shi-hwan as Yi-saeng
- Kim Bo-yeon as Mae-hyang

=== Supporting ===
- Jo Sung-ha as Eom-soo
- Lee In-hye as Gae-ddong/Danshim
- Jung Kyung-soon as Geum-choon
- Song Yi-woo as Aeng-moo
- Yoo Yeon-ji as Seom-seom
- Kim Sun-hwa as Gae-ddong's maid
- Jo Ye-na as Hyang-rim
- Mi Se as Ae-rang
- Lee Ji-eun as Geum-hong
- Hwang Eun-ha as Han Yeon-woo/Wol-hyang
- Hyun Seok as Sung Ik-hwan
- Seo Hyun-jin as Jung Ka-eun
- Kim Seung-wook as Jang Soo-man
- Lee Dae-ro as Joo-ji
- Jo Jae-wan as Jang-yi
- Lee Hee-do as Kim Cham-pan
- Ahn Hae-sook as Lady Cha
- Moon Chun-shik as Deok-pal
- Jung Sang-hoon as Sang-soo
- Choi Sang-hoon as Jung-chook
- Yoon Jae-rang as Yeon-hong
- Park Kwi-soon as Sang Jwa-seung
- Son Seong-yoon as Gisaeng
- Lee In (Note: Credited as Lee Joon.)

== Production ==
The shooting schedule for Hwang Jini was particularly arduous for a television series, sometimes going on for seven days without a break. In addition to such popular younger actors as Ha Ji-won, Wang Bit-na, Kim Jaewon and Jang Keun-suk, the series featured many noted veteran Korean actors, including Kim Young-ae and Kim Bo-yeon. The costumes (designed by Kim Hye-sun), dances and music in the series were noted for their flamboyance and sensuality.

== Ratings ==
Date	Episode	Nationwide	Seoul
2006-Oct-11	1	20.1%	20.9%
2006-Oct-12	2	20.9%	22.0%
2006-Oct-18	3	18.4%	18.7%
2006-Oct-19	4	18.7%	19.0%
2006-Oct-25	5	16.9%	16.7%
2006-Oct-26	6	17.7%	18.1%
2006-Nov-01	7	17.2%	17.1%
2006-Nov-02	8	19.2%	19.3%
2006-Nov-08	9	16.6%	15.8%
2006-Nov-09	10	19.7%	19.9%
2006-Nov-15	11	23.3%	23.7%
2006-Nov-16	12	24.9%	25.4%
2006-Nov-22	13	24.6%	25.7%
2006-Nov-23	14	26.7%	27.4%
2006-Nov-29	15	22.9%	22.9%
2006-Nov-30	16	23.9%	25.5%
2006-Dec-06	17	23.0%	24.1%
2006-Dec-07	18	24.8%	25.1%
2006-Dec-13	19	22.9%	24.0%
2006-Dec-14	20	22.9%	24.6%
2006-Dec-20	21	22.2%	22.6%
2006-Dec-21	22	24.3%	25.2%
2006-Dec-27	23	24.1%	24.8%
2006-Dec-28	24	25.0%	26.8%
Average		21.7%	22.3%

Source: TNS Media Korea

== See also ==
- Hwang Jin Yi (film)
- Eoudong
