= Literature from the "Axis of Evil" =

Literary anthology of works by twenty writers from seven countries

- First edition
- Author: Various (anthology)
- Language: English (works translated from Persian, Arabic, Korean, Spanish, French, and German)
- Subject: World literature
- Genre: Literature
- Publisher: The New Press
- Publication date: 2006
- Publication place: United States; translated works of authors from seven other countries
- Media type: Print
- Pages: 297
- ISBN: 978-1-59558-205-8
- OCLC: 64442957

Literature from the "Axis of Evil" is an anthology of short stories, poems and excerpts from novels by twenty writers from seven countries, translated into English (often for the first time), and published by Words Without Borders in 2006.

The purpose of the anthology, as described in the editors' note, is to increase "American access to world literature in translation". The editors wrote:

This book was born in conscientious objection to the use of 'axis of evil' rhetoric and to the OFAC's apparent fear of 'free trade' in ideas and literature [...]. Our intention has never been to present a naive apology for tyrannical regimes nor to recommend any particular political solution to the problems they present both internationally and for their own people [...]. Rather, we aim simply to stimulate international conversation through literature, with all its complexity and nuanced insights into the ideas, beliefs, daily lives and articles of reference of people in other cultures, who are thinking and writing in languages other than English.

The editors selected works, all published in the second half of the 20th or early 21st century, by authors living in, or originating from, Iran, Iraq, North Korea, Syria, Libya, Sudan and Cuba. A brief overview of the contemporary literature of each country is provided, to set the writings in their specific national context.

== Writers and works included ==
- Iran
  - Houshang Moradi-Kermani: "The Vice-Principal" (short story, 1979)
  - Tirdad Zolghadr: excerpt from the novella A Little Less Conversation (2006) (Note: This is the only work originally written in English.)
  - Ahmad Shamlou: "Existence" (poem, 1957)
- Iraq
  - Salah Al-Hamdani: "Baghdad My Beloved" (poem, 2003)
  - Sherko Fatah: excerpt from the novel At the Borderline (2001)
  - Muhsin Al-Ramli: excerpt from the novel Scattered Crumbs (late 1990s)
  - Saadi Youssef: "Five Crosses" (poem, 1961)
  - Fadhil Al-Azzawi: "Hameed Nylon", first chapter of the novel The Last of the Angels (1992)
- North Korea
  - Kang Kwi-mi: "A Tale of Music" (short story, 2003)
  - Hong Seok-jung: excerpt from the novel Hwangjini (2002)
  - Lim Hwa-won: "The Fifth Photograph" (short story, 2001)
  - Byungu Chon: "Falling Persimmons" (poem, 1992)
- Syria
  - Hanna Mina: "On the Sacks" (short story, 1976)
  - Salim Barakat: excerpt from the novel Jurists of Darkness (1985)
- Libya
  - Khamel al-Maghur: "The Soldiers' Plumes", excerpt from the memoir Stations (late 1990s or early 2000s)
  - Ashur Etwebi: "The Place Will Fit Everything" (poem)
- Sudan
  - Tarek Eltayeb: "Coffee and Water" (poem, 1999)
  - Tarek Eltayeb: "The Sweetest Tea with the Most Beautiful Woman in the World" (short story, 1993)
- Cuba
  - Anna Lidía Vega Serova: "Project for a Commemorative Mural (Mixed Media)" (poem, 2001)
  - Francisco García Gonzáles: "Women of the Federation" (short story, 2003)
  - Raúl Rivero: "I Don't Want Anyone Coming Around to Save Me" (poem, 2002)

== Critical reviews ==
Chandrahas Choudhury of The Indian Express also provided a positive review:

In a world where groups, nations, and – we are sometimes told, and are tempted to believe – even entire religions are locked in irresoluble conflict, it is sometimes easier to dissolve our sense of the individual and place instead a collective stamp over peoples and territories. Literature from the "Axis of Evil" seeks to combat this tendency in a way that only literature, which privileges individual experience and presents specific yet sharable human dilemmas, can.

== See also ==
- Lullabies from the Axis of Evil
- Holidays in the Axis of Evil
