= Mrs. Cop =

2015 South Korean drama series

- Promotional poster
- Genre: Police procedural
- Written by: Hwang Joo-ha
- Directed by: Yoo In-shik; Ahn Gil-ho
- Starring: Kim Hee-ae; Kim Min-jong
- Composer: Ha Geun-young
- Country of origin: South Korea
- Original language: Korean
- No. of episodes: 18

Production
- Executive producer: Yoon Seok-gyu
- Producer: Han Jung-hwan
- Cinematography: Lee Gil-bok; Hwang Min-shik
- Editors: Jo In-hyung; Im Ho-cheol
- Running time: 65 minutes
- Production companies: Salt & Light Media; Group8

Original release
- Network: Seoul Broadcasting System
- Release: 3 August – 29 September 2015

Related
- Mrs. Cop 2 (2016)

Mrs. Cop
- Promotional poster
- Genre: Crime; Police procedural Thriller
- Written by: Hwang Joo-ha
- Directed by: Yoo In-sik
- Starring: Kim Sung-ryung; Kim Min-jong; Kim Bum; Lim Seul-ong; Son Dam-bi
- Country of origin: South Korea
- Original language: Korean
- No. of seasons: 1
- No. of episodes: 20

Production
- Executive producers: Lee Yong-suk; Ahn Hyeong-jo; Yoon Suk-gyu
- Producer: Lee Sang-min
- Production companies: Jidam Inc. (formerly Yein E&M); Salt & Light Media

Original release
- Network: SBS TV
- Release: 5 March – 8 May 2016

Related
- Mrs. Cop (2015)

Mrs. Cop (Korean: 미세스 캅) is a 2015 South Korean drama series starring Kim Hee-ae, Kim Min-jong, Lee Da-hee, Son Ho-jun, Heo Jung-do and Lee Gi-kwang. It aired on SBS on Mondays and Tuesdays at 21:55 for 18 episodes beginning 3 August 2015.

Mrs. Cop 2 (Korean: 미세스 캅 2) is a 2016 South Korean television series and season 2 of Mrs. Cop (2015) starring Kim Sung-ryung, Kim Min-jong, Kim Bum, Lim Seul-ong, and Son Dam-bi. The story revolves around a policewoman (Kim Sung-ryung) and her newly formed detective team (Lee Joon-hyuk, Kim Hee-chan, Lim Seul-ong, and Son Dam-bi) as they try to solve various criminal cases that are related to a CEO (Kim Bum). The series aired on SBS from March 5 to May 8, 2016 every Saturday and Sunday at 22:00. It received multiple nominations at the 2016 SBS Drama Awards.

== Plot ==
=== Season 1 ===
Choi Young-Jin (Kim Hee-ae) is a female detective squad chief. She also raises her daughter Ha-Eun. At work, she deals with brutal crimes with her senior detective Park Jong-Ho (Kim Min-jong) and squad members Min Do-Young (Lee Da-hee), Han Jin-Woo (Son Ho-jun), Jo Jae-Deok (Heo Jung-do) and Lee Se-Won (Lee Gi-kwang).

=== Season 2 ===
Following the events of Mrs. Cop, Park Jong-ho of Seoul Metropolitan Police Agency planned to fill in Crime Squad Team One since its leader Choi Young-jin left and the rest of her team followed suit. The head of police recommended Ko Yoon-jung to be the new leader. She has just returned to South Korea from New York after 6 years wherein she trained with the F.B.I. She intended to reopen the Bundang female college student murder case that she solved in 2010 because she discovered that the imprisoned culprit Min Jong-bun is actually innocent. As the new team captain, she formed the new Crime Squad Team One composed of Bae Dae-hoon, Kang Sang-chul, Oh Seung-il, and Shin Yeo-ok.

The first assignment of the team was the Jung Mi-ryung murder case in which CEO Lee Ro-joon of EL Capital is the principal suspect. After an in-depth investigation, Yoon-jung deduced that this is not a standalone case but rather a serial murder case that took place every March 15 for the last 6 years (from 2010 to 2015), starting with the Bundang female college student murder case. In turn, she ruled out Ro-joon as the suspect since he was not in the country until 2011. However, she suspected Ro-joon to have pertinent info about the case so she pursued him. She was tricked into a deal with Ro-joon to exempt him from the reinvestigation in exchange for the info about the real criminal. Eventually, his tip helped Yoon-jung and her team capture the real culprit Kim Ha-ram.

Next, the team decided to take on the case of pickpocketing which Jong-ho and Detective Jung frowned upon. While looking for intel, they discovered a lead to the big-time swindler Joo Hee-chul instead. After two undercover missions, they caught the swindler and his group in an armed operation.

Yoon-jung discovered EL Capital's investment in Hee-chul so she met with Ro-joon personally to question its validity. As she was leaving their meeting place, she stumbled upon the case of Ha Sung-woo's disappearance. Not long after, they found Sung-woo's corpse in a river. After meeting with the sole witness Lee Hae-in, she confirmed her suspicion that Ro-joon is the murderer in this case. They arrested him with Director Baek Jong-shik as his accomplice. However, Hae-in appeared to have attempted suicide before testifying in the trial. Without a witness, the murder case had no evidence to proceed. Through Yoon-jung's keen insight and Ro-joon's confession, it is revealed that he staged her suicide through coercion and betting in a game. However, this case could not be proven as Yoon-jung's attempt to record Ro-joon's confession failed. Since Hae-in is in critical condition and unable to testify, the prosecutor did not appeal the case. Therefore, Ro-joon was found innocent for now.

In the meantime, the Seoul Metropolitan Police Agency set an operation to capture the Gangnam gangster group that controls illegal drug markets across the country. They succeeded and arrested all gang members except for two. Upon further inquiry, it turned out that the missing members were killed by Ro-joon in self-defense when he was attacked by the gang. Though they wanted to prosecute him, the murders were valid on the basis of self-defense.

Next, Yoon-jung and her team take on the suicide case of Cha Seul-ho whose body was found in Dong Woo University Hospital. Recently, his daughter suffering from a rare disease died in the same hospital due to alleged medical malpractice. However, they discovered that Seul-ho committed suicide at EL Capital and Jong-shik dumped his corpse in the hospital. Their investigation culminated when Seul-ho's will was recovered through pressure mark analysis. It is revealed to the public that EL Capital staged the medical malpractice allegation in order to accelerate the sale of the hospital to the company. As a result, the sale did not proceed, the scandal damaged the company's image, and Jong-shik stepped down as director to take all the blame. This marked the start of Ro-joon's downfall.

Meanwhile, Ro-joon's adversary Director Park Joon-young is on the move to oust him and be the new CEO given the current circumstances. Previously, Joon-young ordered six Gangnam gangster group members to kill Ro-joon. Knowing this, Yoon-jung offered Joon-young to spy on Ro-joon and was eventually convinced by Jong-ho to do so. In addition to Ro-joon's mounting problems, his mother Seo Jung-mi was arrested for bidding in an illegal auction of stolen artworks. The police issued a search warrant to find more stolen artworks in Jung-mi's house. While searching, they found the letter of Ro-joon's late father Lee Bong-jun which states his intention to return his money and properties to society. The police also cracked down the storage room at Attirance Gallery full of stolen artworks and artifacts. Those collections are owned and inherited by Ro-joon from his father.

Given the circumstances, Ro-joon lacked funds for lobbying the government to establish hospitals for profit. He then ordered to smuggle 50 billion won from the cash reserves of EL Capital disguised for supplying the shortage in their branches. Director Park tipped Yoon-jung that this is a suspicious and unusual amount of money withdrawn. The police pursued the van carrying the money and the latter even attempted to mislead them by changing its label. However, Yoon-jung figured out this change and continuously chased the van until it met an accident and got burned along with the cash it carried. In a desperate move, Ro-joon borrowed 30 billion won in cash with high interest from a private moneylender just to pursue lobbying for his project.

On the other hand, Yoon-jung and her team handled the murder case of Im Min-son in which Lawyer Seo is the primary suspect. Lawyer Seo thought he was the cause of Min-son's death so he blackmailed Director Park to cover it up for him. Two years ago, Lawyer Seo handled Lee Bum-jin's will to return his money and properties to society but Director Park took the original copy. However, he kept a soft copy of the will. In the present, Director Park sent someone to kill Atty. Seo instead but he escaped. He approached Ro-joon for help but ordered his men to lock him up. He escaped and planned to surrender to the police. However, he was chased by Jong-shik's men and Yoon-jung and her team on a highway until he met a fatal accident. Upon dying, he gave the copy of the will in a memory card to Yoon-jung. Meanwhile, Yeo-ok and Yoon-jung figured out the real murderer was Yoo Ok-im, Im Min-son's housekeeper.

In the shareholders' meeting, Director Park was declared as the new CEO with the deciding vote coming from Jung-mi. She voted for him in exchange for the evidence that Ro-joon killed his own father because of his decision to return his money and properties to society. On one hand, Yoon-jung used the will to blackmail CEO Park to reveal Ro-joon's weakness. He told her about the doctor who was the sole witness of Bum-jin's murder. Meanwhile, Hae-in was already recovering so the police transferred her to a safe place in the countryside. While accompanying her, Yeo-ok found a bloodstain on the sweater worn by Hae-in on the day of the crime. She confirmed her suspicion that it was Ro-joon's blood. This physical evidence enabled them to issue a warrant of arrest against Ro-joon. They arrested Ro-joon after another shareholders' meeting in which he was re-elected as CEO after Director Park's disappearance. Before this, Director Park was shot dead by Director Baek on Ro-joon's order right before his inauguration. Ro-joon was detained but was able to escape while disguising himself as a cop.

In a last attempt to kill Yoon-jung, Ro-joon kidnapped Seung-il so that Yoon-jung will come to save him. This confrontation backfired as Jong-shik was fatally wounded and killed himself instead, allowing Ro-joon to escape. He attempted to escape the country to Brazil with former chief justice Kang but was cornered by the police in hot pursuit. He was successfully arrested and was later sentenced to death. On the other hand, Yoon-jung and her team were honored for their brave services. They continue with fighting crimes daily, believing it would someday lead to a fair world.

== Cast ==
=== Main characters ===
- Kim Hee-ae as Choi Young-jin

Lead detective of the violent crimes squad, a veteran police officer and mother of Ha-eun

- Kim Min-jong as Park Jong-ho

Young-jin's longtime partner in the police force, calm and rational. In Season 2, he is the section head at Seoul Metropolitan Police Agency. At first, he despised Ko Yoon-jung because he believes she only attained the Crime Squad Team One leader position through connections. But later on, he regarded Yoon-Jung's leadership as she constantly solved crucial cases with her team.

- Lee Da-hee as Min Do-young

Graduate of the police academy, has beauty and brains

- Son Ho-jun as Han Jin-woo

A former special forces soldier

- Heo Jung-do as Jo Jae-deok
- Lee Gi-kwang as Lee Se-won

Most junior member (maknae) of Young-jin's team, a rookie that has never had to worry about anything, a mama's boy

==== Season 2 ====
- Kim Sung-ryung as Ko Yoon-jung, the titular character, a 40-year-old wise and strong policewoman with sophisticated style, the new captain of Crime Squad Team One and the only female leader at Seoul Metropolitan Police Agency, originally from Bun Dang Police Department, an alumna of Korea National Police University.
- Kim Bum as Lee Ro-joon, the recurring antagonist, the young, charismatic, and cunning CEO of EL Capital (a large lending company), who committed various crimes for his self-interests and to retain his status quo.
- Lim Seul-ong as Oh Seung-il / Oh Dae-gam, the 30-year-old principled but stiff and hot-tempered member of Crime Squad Team One, Shin Yeo-ok's senior and buddy and later on love interest, originally from the marine corps.
- Son Dam-bi as Shin Yeo-ok, the inquisitive and outspoken member of Crime Squad Team One, a sergeant, originally from Central Division police.

=== Supporting characters ===
- Shin So-yul as Choi Nam-jin, Young-jin's dependable little sister, studying for the public service exams
- Lee Ki-young as Yeom Sang-min
- Son Byong-ho as Kang Tae-Yoo
- Kim Kap-soo as Park Dong-Il
- Jang In-sub as Prosecutor Go
- Jung Soo-young as Jae-deok's wife
- Park Sung-geun as Yoon Sung-Geun
- Jeon Se-hyun as Kim Min-Young
- Lee Jin-kwon as Lee Man-young
- Shin Seung-hwan as Bae Dal-Hwan
- Choi Hyo-eun as Kim Na-rae
- Shin Rin-ah as Seo Ha-Eun, Young-jin's daughter.

==== Seoul Metropolitan Police Agency ====
- Lee Joon-hyuk as Bae Dae-hoon, the first recruit and senior member of Crime Squad Team One, Kang Sang-chul's buddy, senior of Shin Yeo-ok at Central Division police. He is good at explaining scenarios and knows many resource persons.
- Kim Hee-chan as Kang Sang-chul, the youngest member of Crime Squad Team One, a constable, known for wielding a baton. (Eps. 2-20)
- Jung In-kyum as Jung In-kyum, a senior detective idolized by Ko Yoon-jung for his persistence in solving cases particularly the Seo Cho-dong child kidnapping case, the trusted friend and insider of Park Woo-jin.
- Yoo Hyung-kwan as Choi Jae-young, the head of police.

==== EL Capital ====
- Choi Jin-ho as Baek Jong-shik, right-hand man of Lee Ro-joon and a former secret agent who escaped from North Korea
- Cha Hwa-yeon as Seo Jung-mi, mother of Lee Ro-joon, a director of EL Capital.
- Lee Chul-min as Park Joon-young, a director of EL Capital and Ro-joon's adversary in the company, former right-hand man of Ro-joon's father. (Eps. 9-10, 13-19)
- Lee Suk as Atty. Heo Young-soon, lawyer of Lee Ro-joon.

==== People around Ko Yoon-jung ====
- Jang Hyun-sung as Park Woo-jin, Ko Yoon-jung's estranged husband, head of Seoul District Prosecutors Office. He was the main prosecutor in the 2010 Bun Dang female college student murder case. When the real culprit sent a photo of the murder weapon and the victim's ID to Yoon-jung, he burned it to protect his wife from the repercussions of her mistake. However, Yoon-jung took this as his way of protecting his own interest since he will be promoted at that time. As a result, she separated from him and attempted to divorce him.
- Yoon Joo-sang as Ko Byung-shik, Ko Yoon-jung's father, a food blogger.
- Lee Hyo-je as Park Min-jae, Ko Yoon-jung and Park Woo-jin's son who grew up in the U.S.

==== Others ====
- Kim Byung-chul as Min Jong-bum, a taxi driver who was wrongfully imprisoned for the 2010 Bun Dang female college student murder case. In 2010, a drunk passenger named Lee Ji-young constantly mocked and cursed him so he forcefully pulled her outside. Ji-young was found dead after and he was deemed by Ko Yoon-jung as the culprit. Six years later, Yoon-jung arrested the real criminal so he was freed. He thanked Yoon-jung but can never forgive her since she cannot turn back time. Later, he was persuaded by Lee Ro-joon to kill Ko Yoon-jung. He did strangle her but felt guilty so he rushed her to a hospital. He confessed to Yoon-jung that Ro-joon made a contract to kill her. Although this evidence is her chance to finally catch Ro-joon, she let it slide to exempt Jong-bum.(Eps. 2, 5, 12-14, 16)
- Lee Mi-do as Bae Soo-min, Bae Da-hoon's sister who owns Yong Hu Chinese Restaurant.
- Kim Ji-eun as Lee Ro-joon's secretary a stern woman and loyal to Lee Ro-joon.
- Shin Seung-hwan as Bae Da-rang, an illegal car dealer and Bae Dae-hoon's resource person. (Eps. 7, 10, 14, 20)
- Park Jin-young as Kang Jin-beom, chief justice who later became the chief of the national assembly. (Eps. 6, 12, 19-20)
- Ha Eun-jin as Kwon Da-eun, a curator at Attirance Gallery, Lee Ro-joon's date, arrested for selling stolen artworks. (Eps. 6, 11, 14-15)

==== Serial Murder Case ====
- Lee Ji-young, a female college student murdered on March 15, 2010 by a hammer blow on her head. (Ep. 2)
- Song Hae-suk, murdered on March 15, 2011 by a hammer blow on her head, body found in a park. She was sued for making vicious online comments. (Eps. 3 & 4)
- Kim Mi-yeon, an office worker, murdered on March 15, 2012 by poisoning, body found in a department store's restroom. She consented to a one night stand with a man but sued him after. The truth was revealed in the news so she was bashed online. (Eps. 3 & 4)
- Choi Soon-ae, a university student, murdered on March 15, 2013 by asphyxiation. She was known online for targeting rich men, getting luxury bags in turn then reselling them. (Eps. 3 & 4)
- Yoo Mi-ae, a housewife, murdered on March 15, 2014 by a hammer blow on her head, body found in car park basement. She made an employee kneel down and threw money at him which was filmed then spread through SNS. (Eps. 3 & 4)
- Jung Mi-ryung, a 57-year-old chancellor of Jo Yang University, who was murdered on March 15, 2015 by a hammer blow on her head. Her arrogant behavior in a gas station was caught on cam that spread online. She also fired female workers if they became pregnant or use their pregnancy leave. Initially, she was against EL Capital's takeover of the school but later agreed to meet with Lee Ro-joon to negotiate. At their meeting place, Ro-joon and Baek Jong-shik found her body and used her thumbprint to sign the sale contract. (Eps. 1 & 4)
- Joo Sook-tae as Lee Joong-min, a detective from South Gyeonggi department, bribed by Lee Ro-joon to exempt him from the Jung Mi-ryung murder case investigation in exchange for paying off his debt. He was approached by Oh Seung-il and Shin Yeo-ok about the case but was uncooperative. He was cornered by Bae Dae-hoon during an illegal gambling raid but he still refused to talk. (Eps. 2 & 3)
- Han Ji-an as Lee Jin-ah, commercial model and talent of Winners Agency, initially believed to be the next target of the serial killer. (Ep. 4)
- Kim Jeong-soon, CEO of Winners Agency, the next target of the serial killer. She made an indecent offer to Han Ji-an to promote the latter's career. (Eps. 4 & 5)
- Seo Young as Kim Ha-ram, a trans woman serial killer and school psychologist. (Eps. 4 & 5)
- Lee Hyun-wook as a detective from the cold case team who tried to outrun Crime Squad Team One in solving this case. (Ep. 4)
- Choi So-young, a student asked by Kim Ha-ram to take a video inside her apartment. (Ep. 4)

==== Ha Sung-woo Murder Case ====
- Yoo Jang-young as Ha Sung-woo, a bartender murdered by Lee Ro-joon for badmouthing him. (Eps. 4 & 8)
- Jang Seo-kyung as Lee Hae-in, the sole witness of this case who quit her bartending job and worked as a convenience store staff instead. (Eps. 8-11, 18-19
- Kim Min-ha as Lee Hae-in's younger sister. (Eps. 10-11, 18-19
- Jung Seung-guk, highschool friend of Ha Sung-woo, last caller before his death. (Ep. 8)

==== Dong Woo University Hospital Case ====
- Kim Hak-seon as Cha Seul-ho, father of Cha Eun-soo and Cha Eun-soo, persuaded by Lee Ro-joon to euthanize his own daughter. (Eps. 11-12)
- Lee Da-kyung as Cha Eun-soo, elder daughter of Cha Seul-ho, killed by her own father. (Eps. 11-13)
- Jo A-in as Cha Eun-ji, younger daughter of Cha Seul-ho. (Eps. 12-13)

==== Illegal Drug-Related Cases ====
- Kim Young-woo, illegal drug broker in Myanmar and Cambodia. (Ep. 12)
- Yang Jung-man, leader of Gangnam group of gangsters who control illegal drug markets in South Korea. (Ep. 12)
- Min Sung-wook as Atty Seo Jin-woo, the sole witness of Lee Bum-jin's will. (Eps. 16-17)
- Im Min-son, Atty Seo's lover who died of a drug overdose. (Eps. 17-18)
- Won Jong-dae, Im Min-son's estranged husband who filed for divorce, initial suspect of her murder. (Ep. 17)
- Park Myung-shin as Yoo Ok-im, the housekeeper of Im Min-son. She injected an excessive dose of an illegal drug into Min-son while sleeping which led to her death. (Eps. 17-18)

==== Other Cases ====
- Lee Jae-yong as Jo Hee-chul, a big-time swindler. (Eps. 7-9)
- Heo Jun-seok as Jo Jae-pil, son of Jo Hee-chul disguised as a monk in a Buddhist temple. (Eps. 7 & 8)
- Hwang Chung-soo, member of Gangnam group, stabbed by Lee Ro-joon as self-defense. (Ep. 10)
- Kim Suk-ho, member of Gangnam group, hammered by Lee Ro-joon as self-defense. (Ep. 10)
- Jung Woo, the real criminal in the alleged Song family murder case originally deemed as suicide. (Ep. 1)
- Kim Cheul-seung, a criminal chased by Oh Seung-il and Ko Yoon-jung from a department store to the streets. (Ep. 1)

==== Special appearances ====
- Yoon Byung-hee as Bang Bae-dong, the Squirrel, a criminal known for illegal trading. (Eps. 10, 14)
- Yeong Deung Po Dol Go Rae, a gangster who uses a hammer as a weapon, underground source of Bae Dae-hoon. (Ep. 2)
- Yoo Hyung-kwan as Ji Chung-jang
- Kim Ji-eun as Lee Ro-joon's secretary. (Eps. 12-13, 15)
- Jo Sun-mook as Yoo Jae-chul, chancellor of Jo Yang University and lover of Seo Jung-mi. He was threatened by Lee Ro-joon in having a serious affair with his mother so as not to have shares in the company. Upon issuance of a warrant, he surrendered the Jo Yang University sale contract to the police. (Eps. 1 & 3)
- Park Young-soo as a property agent. (Ep. 1)
- Kim Nan-hwi as Madam Park, Min-jong's informer. (Eps. 12, 14, 16)
- Min Jin-woong as Nam Hae-ryong, one of Baek Jong-shik's hired men. (Eps. 16-20)
- Lee Man-young, one of Baek Jong-shik's hired men. (Eps. 16-20)
- Lee Jin-kwon as Lee Man-young
- Heo Joon-suk as Jo Jae-pil
- Lee Hyun-wook as a detective from another police station.
- Kim Kang-il as Kazuki, a big Japanese investor of EL Capital who wants to withdraw his investment because of the company's scandal. (Ep. 14)
- Nam Kyung-eup as Lee Bum-jin, Lee Ro-joon's father.
- Han Chul-woo as Jin-pyo, Baek Jong-shik's accomplice. (Eps. 9-12, 14, 16)
- Shim Young-dae, one of the imprisoned Gangnam gangster group members who attempted to murder Lee Ro-joon, secret lover of his boss Yang Jung-man's girlfriend, later committed suicide but Yoon-jung concluded he was murdered by Director Yoon as ordered by Director Park
- Seo Deong-ha, a renowned painter, grand prize winner for "Tears of the Sun" painting which he actually plagiarized unbeknownst to the public, bribed by Lee Ro-joon to sell his other painting not intended for sale to him in exchange for his silence about the plagiarized work. (Ep. 6)
- Seo Byung-wook, driver of the truck that hid the vehicle carrying smuggled money from EL Capital capital cash reserves. (Ep. 15)
- Kim Dong-suk, president of a criminal group whom Lee Ro-joon attempted to borrow money from. (Ep. 16)
- Do Yong-woo, a gangster caught by Ko Yoon-jung's team. They made him escape so they could lead them to the gang's financier unknowingly. (Ep. 16)
- Kim Hyung-min, a chef and financier of gangster group, cousin of Director Park (Ep. 16)
- Choi Chang-ho, boss of Young Do gangster group who works for Director Yoon of EL Capital. (Ep. 18)
- Kim Dong-shik, doctor and witness of Lee Bum-jin's death (Eps. 18-19)
- Kim Byeong-ok as hired killer
- Son Hyun-joo
- Choi Min-ho
- Kim Sung-bum

== Original soundtracks ==
=== OST Part 1 ===
No.	Title	Artist	Length
1.	"Evidence"	Koh Yoo Jin (Flower)	3:45
2.	"Evidence" (Instrumental)		3:45
Total length:			7:30

=== OST Part 2 ===
No.	Title	Artist	Length
1.	"If You Are Love"	Lim Seul-ong	3:15
2.	"If You Are Love" (Instrumental)		3:15
Total length:			6:30

=== OST Part 3 ===
No.	Title	Artist	Length
1.	"Then Come Find Me"	Woo Ye-rin	3:22
2.	"Then Come Find Me" (Instrumental)		3:22
Total length:			6:44

=== OST Part 4 ===
No.	Title	Artist	Length
1.	"Close Your Eyes"	Ha Neul-hae	4:23
2.	"Close Your Eyes" (Instrumental)		4:23
Total length:			8:46

== Ratings ==
In the table below, the blue numbers represent the lowest ratings and the red numbers represent the highest ratings.

Episode #	Original broadcast date	Average audience share			
Episode #	Original broadcast date	TNmS Ratings		AGB Nielsen	
Episode #	Original broadcast date	Nationwide	Seoul National Capital Area	Nationwide	Seoul National Capital Area
1	3 August 2015	7.2%	9.1%	8.4%	9.0%
2	4 August 2015	7.4%	9.1%	9.4%	10.2%
3	10 August 2015	7.7%	8.7%	9.2%	9.8%
4	11 August 2015	8.3%	10.8%	10.0%	9.7%
5	17 August 2015	9.8%	12.1%	10.8%	12.1%
6	18 August 2015	10.1%	12.8%	12.1%	12.7%
7	24 August 2015	10.4%	12.0%	11.6%	13.1%
8	25 August 2015	10.2%	12.3%	12.0%	12.7%
9	31 August 2015	10.6%	13.5%	12.8%	14.3%
10	1 September 2015	10.8%	13.5%	12.7%	13.9%
11	7 September 2015	10.4%	12.1%	12.1%	12.8%
12	8 September 2015	11.1%	13.5%	12.8%	14.3%
13	14 September 2015	11.2%	13.0%	12.6%	13.4%
14	15 September 2015	11.7%	13.7%	13.7%	14.6%
15	21 September 2015	12.0%	14.1%	15.2%	16.7%
16	22 September 2015	12.4%	15.1%	14.6%	16.0%
17	29 September 2015	11.5%	13.6%	13.2%	13.8%
18	29 September 2015	13.9%	15.3%	15.8%	16.4%
Average		10.4%	12.5%	12.2%	13.1%

For season 2:

Episode #	Original broadcast date	Average audience share			
Episode #	Original broadcast date	TNmS Ratings		AGB Nielsen	
Episode #	Original broadcast date	Nationwide	Seoul National Capital Area	Nationwide	Seoul National Capital Area
1	March 5, 2016	7.6%	8.4%	9.2%	10.1%
2	March 6, 2016	9.2%	10.1%	9.3%	10.9%
3	March 12, 2016	8.3%	9.9%	9.4%	10.4%
4	March 13, 2016	8.6%	10.5%	9.5%	10.9%
5	March 19, 2016	7.7%	9.9%	9.1%	10.9%
6	March 20, 2016	8.0%	9.5%	8.6%	9.8%
7	March 26, 2016	7.2%	9.1%	7.6%	9.0%
8	March 27, 2016	8.1%	9.7%	9.6%	10.9%
9	April 2, 2016	8.1%	9.2%	7.6%	8.2%
10	April 3, 2016	6.9%	7.9%	8.2%	9.0%
11	April 9, 2016	7.3%	8.5%	7.7%	8.6%
12	April 10, 2016	8.2%	10.2%	8.5%	8.9%
13	April 16, 2016	7.0%	8.4%	7.6%	8.5%
14	April 17, 2016	8.1%	9.6%	8.2%	9.0%
15	April 23, 2016	8.5%	9.6%	9.5%	11.3%
16	April 24, 2016	8.5%	10.2%	9.3%	10.0%
17	April 30, 2016	8.3%	10.2%	9.2%	10.0%
18	May 1, 2016	10.3%	11.1%	10.0%	10.9%
19	May 7, 2016	8.9%	10.1%	10.1%	11.0%
20	May 8, 2016	9.6%	10.4%	11.1%	12.8%
Average		8.22%	9.625%	8.965%	9.655%

== Awards and nominations ==
Year	Award	Category	Recipient	Result
2015	4th APAN Star Awards	Popularity Award	Son Ho-jun	Won
2015	23rd SBS Drama Awards	New Star Award	Son Ho-jun	Won
2015	23rd SBS Drama Awards	Top Excellence Award, Actress in a Miniseries	Kim Hee-ae	Nominated
2015	23rd SBS Drama Awards	Special Award, Actress in a Miniseries	Lee Da-hee	Won
2015	23rd SBS Drama Awards	Special Award, Actor in a Miniseries	Son Ho-jun	Nominated
2015	23rd SBS Drama Awards	Excellence Award, Actor in a Miniseries	Kim Min-jong	Nominated
2015	23rd SBS Drama Awards	Producer's Award	Kim Hee-ae	Nominated

For season 2:

Year	Award	Category	Recipient	Result
2016	SBS Drama Awards	Grand Prize (Daesang)	Kim Sung-ryung	Nominated
2016	SBS Drama Awards	Top Excellence Award, Actress in a Genre & Fantasy Drama	Kim Sung-ryung	Nominated
2016	SBS Drama Awards	Excellence Award, Actor in a Genre Drama	Kim Bum	Nominated
2016	SBS Drama Awards	Excellence Award, Actress in a Genre Drama	Son Dam-bi	Nominated
2016	SBS Drama Awards	K-Wave Star Award	Kim Sung-ryung	Nominated
2016	SBS Drama Awards	Top 10 Stars Award	Kim Sung-ryung	Won

== International broadcast ==
In the United States, the drama airs in the Los Angeles DMA free, over-the-air on LA 18 KSCI-TV (channel 18) with English subtitles, Sat-Sun 8:50PM, beginning March 19, 2016.
