= Line Up (TV program) =

South Korean reality television series

Line Up (Korean: 라인업) is a South Korean prime time reality television series produced and broadcast by SBS in late 2007 and broadcast every Saturday 6:30pm (KST).

== Overview ==
Line Up is a television entertainment program. As of September, 2007 it had been aired on SBS as the tactics to compete against the most popular reality television program called Infinite Challenge broadcast during the same time slot on MBC.

The program is largely unscripted, and takes a similar form to challenge based reality television programs familiar in other countries, but the challenges are often silly, absurd, or impossible to achieve, so that the program takes on the aspect of a satirical comedy variety show, rather than a more standard reality or contest program. To do that, as the eight hosts and their staff continuously proclaim, the elements of this show are the 3-Ds (Dirty, Dangerous and Difficult). Unlike other South Korean reality television shows, this show divides their casts into two major teams, called "Kyu Line" named after the leading MC "Lee Kyung-kyu" and "Yong Line" named after the MC "Kim Yong-man".

As of 2009, it is cancelled on Summer 2008 after losing on competition by MBC's Infinite Challenge. Currently, SBS aired a show "Star King", which is a program about citizens showing performance.

== Main cast ==
=== Kyu Line ===
- Lee Kyung-kyu - Old Kyung-kyu

The oldest and the leader of the team "Kyu Line". He is one of the longest running comedian on South Korean television who are still running a variety entertainment show on mainstream free-to-air network.

- Kim Gu-ra - Abusive Gura

He is one of the leading members of "Kyu Line". He is supposedly loved by television audience for his direct speech and blunt remarks against other members and against the problems in society in general.

- Lee Yoon-suk - Professor Lee

He is one of the most comedians in South Korea. He graduated from prestigious Yonsei University, and later received a PhD in Media and Communications at Chung-Ang University.

- Boom - Reporter Boom

He is one of the funniest character in "Kyu Line". He is known for his skill as a reporter in another Korean entertainment news show called "Section TV" broadcast on MBC. He is also a singer, and a former member for various K-pop idol groups.

=== Yong Line ===
- Kim Yong-man - 52nd Yong Man

He is the leader of the "Yong Line". He is known for his skills in hosting the host and for his witty comments.

- Shin Jung-hwan - Narrow shoulder man

He is a former member of K-pop duo called Country KoKo. He is known for his random talk, extreme narrow shoulder and his gigantic head size.

- Kim Kyung-min - Loner

He is a mate of the leader Kim Yong-man. He is known for being extremely unpopular among the audience and even within the members. His specialty is to make lame jokes and make the members detest against him.

- Yoon Jung-su - Shorty

He is a famous comedian who is known for his short height. He is generally popular and well known although his characteristic in this show tends to make him a quiet person through the heavy manipulation and editing process.

=== Former members ===
- Lee Dong-woo
- Cho Won-suk
- Sol Bi
