= Salah Al-Hamdani =

Iraqi poet, actor and playwright

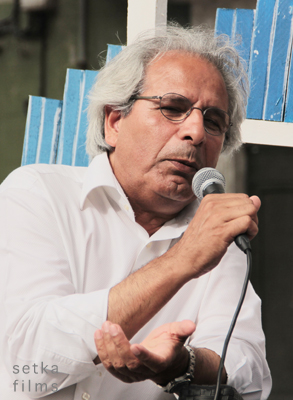
Salah Al-Hamdani (2012)

Salah Al-Hamdani (Arabic: صلاح الحمداني; born in 1951 in Baghdad), is an Iraqi poet, actor, and playwright.

Imprisoned as a political dissident in the 1970s, he began writing in prison. Some of his writing was published in clandestine journals. He has continued to write, in Arabic and in French, since moving to France, where he been living for three decades. In his work, Al-Hamdani opposed Saddam Hussein's government, and subsequently the United States-led Occupation of Iraq.

He is particularly known in France for his 2003 poem "Baghdad Mon Amour" ("Baghdad My Beloved").

Al-Hamdani also assisted Saad Salman in writing the dialogue of the latter's film Baghdad On/Off, which he appeared in as an actor.

== Sources ==
- "Salah Al Hamdani", Le Printemps des Poètes: biography and bibliography (in French)
- Words Without Borders, Literature from the "Axis of Evil", ISBN 978-1-59558-205-8, 2006, pp. 55–6: brief biography
