= Hong Sok-jung =

North Korean writer (born 1941)

- Hangul: 홍석중
- Hanja: 洪錫中
- RR: Hong Seokjung
- MR: Hong Sŏkchung

Hong Sok-jung (Korean: 홍석중; born in Seoul in 1941) is a North Korean writer. He is the grandson of novelist Hong Myong-hui.

Sok-jung moved to North Korea with his family after the Second World War. He served in the Korean People's Navy, and obtained a degree in literature at Kim Il Sung University. His first published work was a short story, "Red Flower", in 1970. In 1979, he joined the Central Committee of North Korea's official literary organisation, the Joseon Writers' Alliance (now under the Korean Federation of Literature and Arts).

In 1993, he published his most successful work, Northeaster, an epic novel. In 2002, he published Hwang Jin-i (황진이), a historical novel set in the Joseon Dynasty of the sixteenth century, which depicts kisaeng (courtesan) Hwang Jin-i's discovery of the people's starvation and her encounters with corrupt officials. Hwang Jin-i was awarded South Korea's Manhae Literary Prize (Korean: 만해문학상) in 2005, the first time it had been awarded to a North Korean writer. An excerpt from the novel was translated into English and published by Words Without Borders (WWB) in Literature from the "Axis of Evil" in 2006.

== See also ==
- North Korean literature

== Sources ==
- Br. Anthony of Taizé, introductory remarks to the excerpt of Hwang Jin-i, in Literature from the "Axis of Evil" (a Words Without Borders anthology), ISBN 978-1-59558-205-8, 2006, pp. 99–101.
