= Hwang Jin Yi (film) =

2007 South Korean film directed by Chang Yoon-hyun

- Poster to Hwang Jin Yi (2007)
- Directed by: Chang Yoon-hyun
- Written by: Kim Hyun-jung
- Based on: Hwangjini by Hong Seok-jung
- Produced by: Lee Chun-yeon; Jo Seong-won; Hwang Gyeong-seong
- Starring: Song Hye-kyo; Yoo Ji-tae
- Cinematography: Choi Young-taek
- Edited by: Nam Na-yeong
- Music by: Won Il
- Distributed by: Cine-2000
- Release date: June 6, 2007 (South Korea)
- Running time: 141 minutes
- Country: South Korea
- Language: Korean
- Budget: US$7,200,000
- Box office: US$8,511,147

Hwang Jin Yi (Korean: 황진이) is a 2007 South Korean biographical drama film directed by Chang Yoon-hyun. Based on Hong Seok-jung's 2002 novel Hwangjini (which won the Manhae Prize for Literature in 2004), the film is about the life of Hwang Jin-yi, the most famous courtesan (or "gisaeng") in Korean history, starring Song Hye-kyo in the title role.

== Plot ==
Raised as an aristocrat in 16th century Joseon, an era when class status dictated one's destiny, Hwang Jin-yi discovers a shocking secret about her birth: she was born illegitimate. She therefore belongs to the lower class, and has no recourse but to give up her aristocratic status. Before embarking on the life of a gisaeng, she decides to give up her virginity to a man of her own choosing, and spends her first night with Nomi, a long-time family servant, whom she is aware loves her deeply. As a gisaeng, Jin-yi becomes celebrated for her legendary beauty, wit, and talents in singing, dancing and poetry. But although she is surrounded by an entourage of noblemen showering her with gifts and admiration, she lives a solitary life of tragic isolation. Jin-yi's only solace is the game she and the local governor play on her noble clients, tricking them into exposing their hypocrisies. But when a bandit leader matching Nomi's description is spotted in the region, Jin-yi begins to question the life she endures.

== Cast ==
- Song Hye-kyo - Hwang Jin-yi
  - Kim You-jung - young Hwang Jin-yi
- Yoo Ji-tae - Nomi
  - Lee Hyun-woo - young Nomi
- Ryu Seung-ryong - Hee-yeol
- Youn Yuh-jung - old woman
- Oh Tae-kyung - Gwiddongi
- Jeong Yu-mi - Yi-geum
- Ye Soo-jung - Hwang Jin-yi's mother
- Jo Seung-yeon - Byeok Kye-soo
- Kim Eung-soo - Seo Gyung-deok
- Kim Boo-seon - Jang-deok
- Song Min-ji - Mae-hyang
- Park Cheol-ho - nobleman Hwang
- Lee Kwang-hee - servant of nobleman Hwang
- Kim Hyun-ah - gisaeng
- Kwon Tae-won - nobleman Kim
- Park No-shik - Choi Joo-boo
- Jo Kyung-hoon - public officer
- Choi Ji-na - Hyun-geum
- Bae Yong-geun - nobleman
- Min Bok-gi - Ho-jang
- Lee Mi-so - Hwang Jin-yi's female servant

== Box office ==
Hwang Jin Yi was highly anticipated due to the star power of Song Hye-kyo, and many expected the film to be a box office hit. It received 1,270,644 admissions nationwide; however, due to its ₩10 billion budget, it was not enough for the producers to turn a profit.

== Awards and nominations ==
2007 Chunsa Film Art Awards

- Best Lighting - Im Jae-young
- Technical Award - Jung Ku-ho

2007 Blue Dragon Film Awards

- Best Lighting - Im Jae-young
- Nomination - Best Actress - Song Hye-kyo
- Nomination - Best Cinematography - Choi Young-taek
- Nomination - Best Art Direction - Kim Jin-cheol, Jung Ku-ho
- Nomination - Technical Award - Jung Ku-ho, Jeong Jeong-eun (Costume Design)

2007 Korean Film Awards

- Best New Actress - Song Hye-kyo
- Nomination - Best New Actor - Ryu Seung-ryong
- Nomination - Best Cinematography - Choi Young-taek
- Nomination - Best Art Direction - Kim Jin-cheol, Jung Ku-ho
- Nomination - Best Music - Won Il

2008 Grand Bell Awards

- Best Costume Design - Jeong Jeong-eun
- Best Music - Won Il
- Nomination - Best Art Direction - Kim Jin-cheol, Jung Ku-ho
- Nomination - Best Lighting - Im Jae-young

== See also ==
- Hwang Jini (TV series)
- Eoudong
