= Song Hye-kyo =

South Korean actress (born 1981)

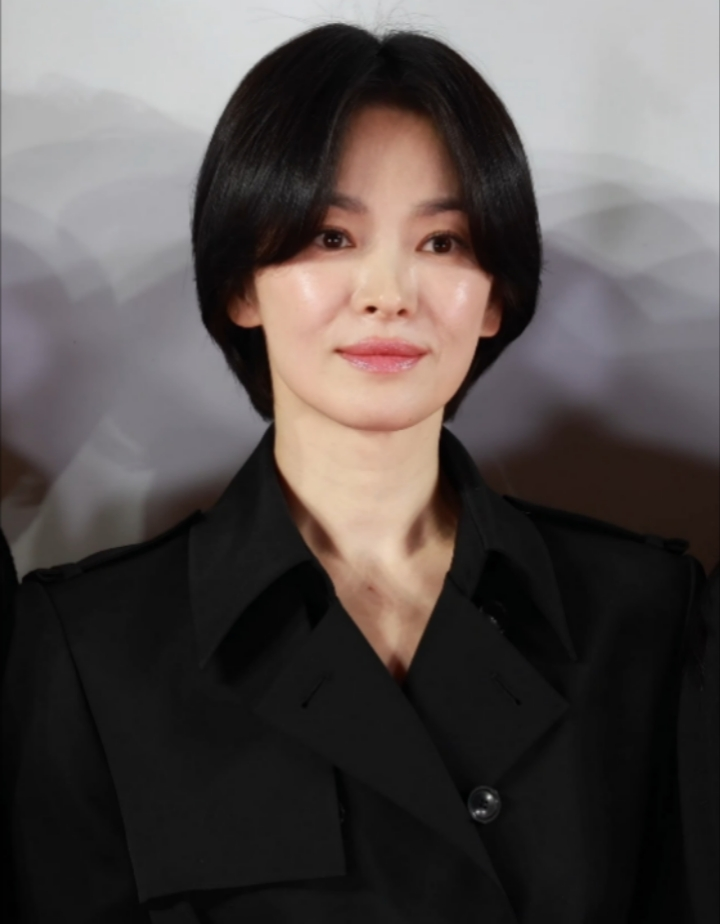
- Song in 2025
- Born: November 22, 1981 (age 45) (Note: Song Hye-kyo was born on November 22, 1981, while her registered birth date is February 26, 1982.); Daegu, South Korea
- Education: Sejong University (BFA)
- Occupation: Actress
- Years active: 1996–present
- Agents: STAND; United Artists Agency; Jet Tone Films
- Works: Filmography; discography; bibliography
- Spouse: Song Joong-ki (m. 2017; div. 2019)
- Awards: Full list

Korean name
- Hangul: 송혜교
- Hanja: 宋慧敎 (Note: The name '宋慧喬' with a different third Hanja '喬' is not her real Korean name in Hanja; it was the most commonly used Hanja character by most Chinese-language media outlets prior to Song's revelation in 2016.)
- RR: Song Hyegyo
- MR: Song Hyegyo
- Website: songhyekyo.co.kr

Signature
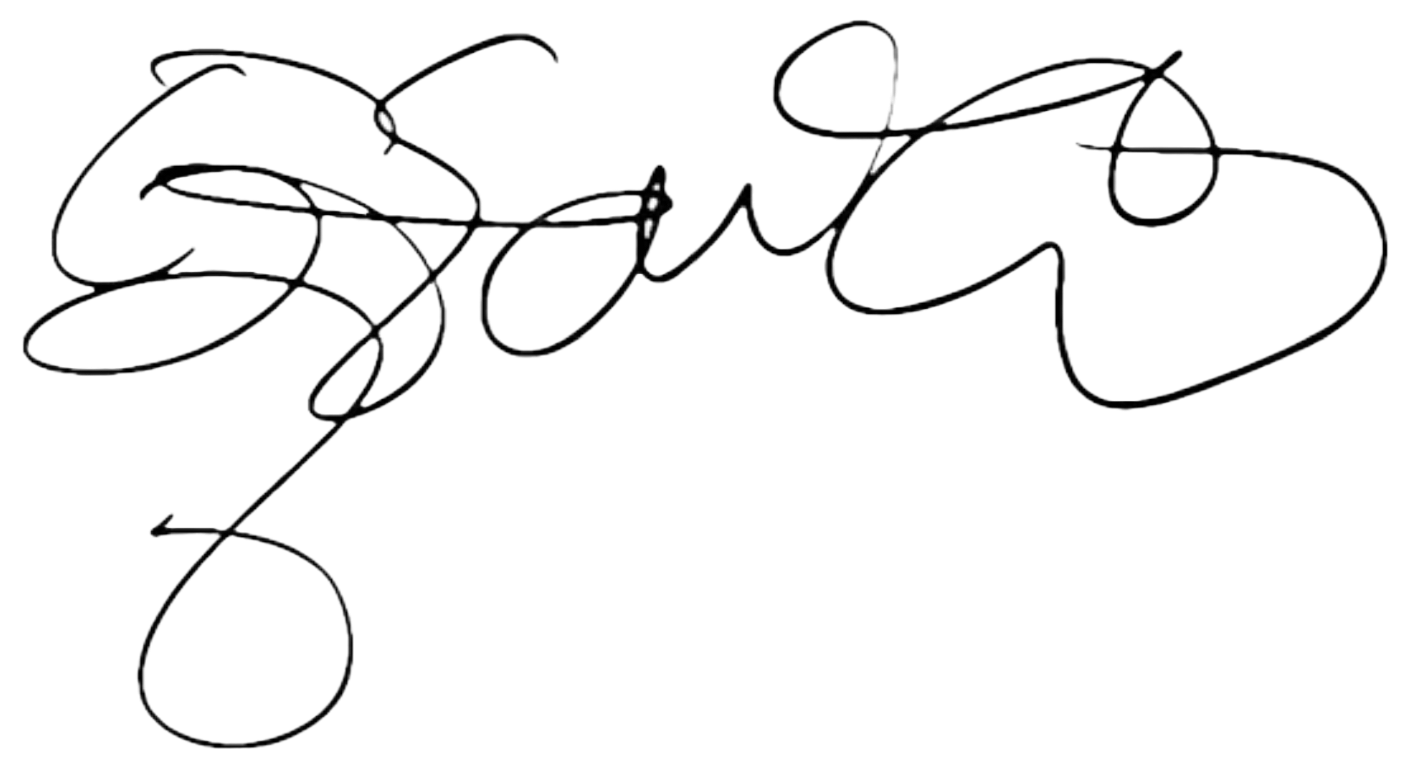

Song Hye-kyo (Korean: 송혜교; born November 22, 1981) is a South Korean actress. She gained international fame through her leading roles in the television dramas Autumn in My Heart (2000), All In (2003), Full House (2004), That Winter, the Wind Blows (2013), Descendants of the Sun (2016), Encounter (2018–2019), and The Glory (2022–2023). Her film work includes Hwang Jin Yi (2007), The Grandmaster (2013), My Brilliant Life (2014), and Dark Nuns (2025).

In 2017, Song ranked 7th in Forbes magazine's Korea Power Celebrity 40 list, and 6th in 2018. She is referred to as one of "The Troika", along with Kim Tae-hee and Jun Ji-hyun, collectively known by the acronym "Tae-Hye-Ji". The success of Song's television dramas internationally established her as a top hallyu star.

== Early life and education ==
When Song was born, she was so ill that her parents and doctors did not think that she would survive. Upon her recovery, Song's parents registered her birth as February 26, 1982 (instead of her actual birthdate, November 22, 1981).

Song's parents divorced when she was a young girl, after which she was raised by her mother. They moved from her birthplace in Daegu to the Gangnam District in Seoul, where she trained as a figure skater in elementary school but quit when she was in the eighth grade. Song considered herself shy and introverted, but when she attended Ewha Girls' High School she was described by her high school teacher as having a "cheerful character, she got along well with her friends and was always in a cheerful mood". Song Hye-kyo attended Sejong University, where she majored in Film Arts.

== Career ==
=== 1996–2004: Debut, breakthrough, and international fame ===
In 1996, the fourteen-year-old Song, then in her third-year of junior high school, won first place in the SunKyung Smart Model Contest, and made her entertainment debut as a model for a school uniform company. This led to her being cast in a small role in her first television drama, First Love. She would then continue to appear in a string of dramas and sitcoms, most notably Soonpoong Clinic. But it was not until the KBS drama Autumn in My Heart in 2000 with Song Seung-heon and Won Bin that she rose to fame in Korea and throughout Asia. The romantic melodrama series was a ratings success, strengthening interest in Korean melodramas in general and further catalyzing the "Korean Wave" with Song one of its hottest stars.

In 2003, her popularity rose further as she played a leading role alongside Lee Byung-hun in the gambling drama All In, which drew solid viewership ratings nationwide throughout its run with a peak viewer rating of 47.7 percent. The following year, she co-starred with singer Rain in the hit romantic comedy series Full House. The drama achieved pan-Asian success and established Song as one of the best-known Korean actresses in Asia.

=== 2005–2012: Film debut and overseas ventures ===
In early 2005, Song went to San Francisco to study English, and later traveled to Seattle. She took time off to recharge after the successful Asian drama Full House. "I have had a good rest. It was a good opportunity to reflect on myself", said Song. Song returned to Korea on March 5, 2005. The same year, Song made her big-screen debut in My Girl and I (a Korean remake of Crying Out Love in the Center of the World), which was panned by audiences and critics alike. Vocal about her dissatisfaction with typecasting in the roles she was being offered, Song proved in the following year that she could play different roles.

She returned to the big screen in 2007 as the titular gisaeng in the film adaptation of Hwang Jin Yi. Because they found Song's image "too cute", Jun Ji-hyun and Soo Ae were the producers' original choices for the role, but Song went on a rigorous diet and surprised the producers with her determination to be Hwang Jini. A year later, she made her American debut in the Hollywood indie Make Yourself at Home (formerly titled Fetish), a psychological thriller about a girl who was born to a shaman mother and who tries to avoid her fate by becoming an emigrant bride in the US. Despite Song's attempts to challenge herself, both films underwhelmed at the box office.

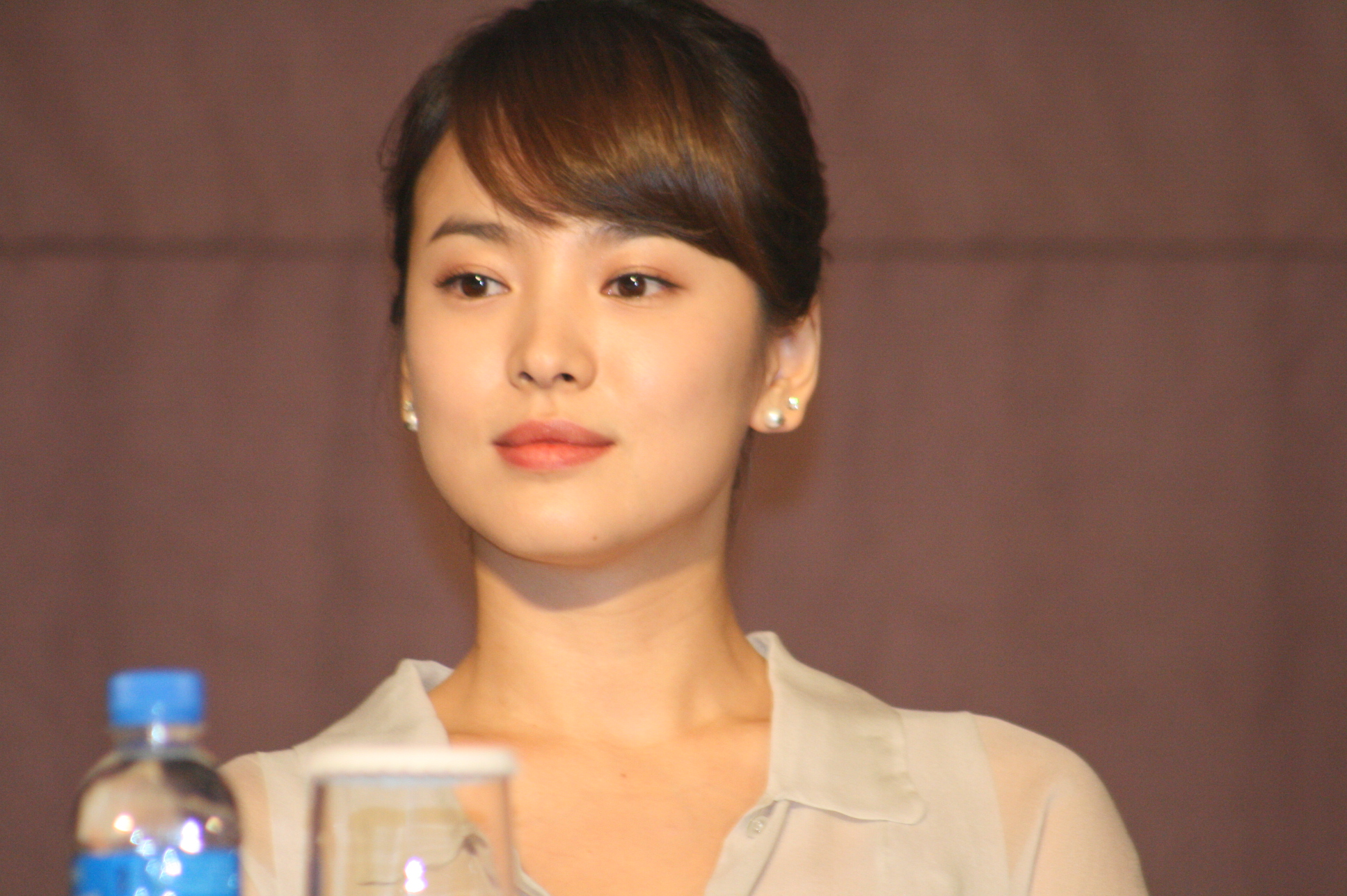
Song in October 2008

She made her TV comeback in late 2008 with The World That They Live In (also known as Worlds Within), a series set at a broadcast station in which Song and Hyun Bin played drama PDs who work together and fall in love.

In 2010, she starred in Camellia, an omnibus film made up of three short films directed by three Asian directors. Each episode is set in Busan - one in the past, one in the present, and one in the future. In the film's final segment, Love for Sale, Song and Kang Dong-won play former lovers who forget their experiences together and presaging an unexpected finale.

Considered one of Korea's most beautiful women, in early 2011 Song released the photo-book Song Hye-kyo's Moment, which was shot by top photographers in Atlanta, New York City, Buenos Aires, Patagonia, Paris, the Netherlands and Brazil. Proceeds from the sales of the photo book was donated to a children's foundation.

Song next played a documentary filmmaker who finds the strength to forgive the seventeen-year-old boy who killed her fiancé but instead of redemption finds only greater tragedy in A Reason to Live (Korean title: Today), which after several delays was released in October 2011. Song was a huge fan of director Lee Jeong-hyang and had actively sought her out, and though she had difficulty getting into character, Song said she fell in love with the script and felt her acting had matured. She considers the film "a turning point" in her life.

In 2011, she became the first Asian actress to sign a contract with French global agency Effigies, paving the way for a potential entry into the European market. She released a photo-essay book in 2012 titled It's Time for Hye-kyo.

Song next played a supporting role in The Grandmaster, Chinese director Wong Kar-wai's biographical film about Bruce Lee's kung fu master Ip Man, for which she learned Cantonese and martial arts. She later admitted there had been "a bit of friction and misunderstanding" with Wong while filming, but that the difficulties helped her mature.

=== 2013–2017: Career resurgence ===
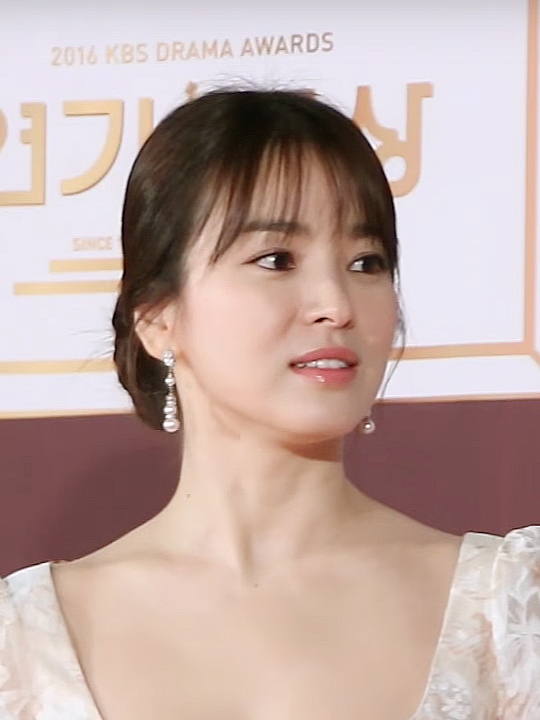
Song at the 2016 KBS Drama Awards

Song reunited with the writer and director of Worlds Within in That Winter, the Wind Blows, a 2013 remake of 2002 Japanese drama Ai Nante Irane Yo, Natsu ("I Don't Need Love, Summer"). She played a blind heiress in the melodrama, opposite a con man pretending to be her long-lost brother (played by Zo In-sung). That Winter, the Wind Blows placed number one in its time slot during most of its run, and Song and Jo were praised for their performances. Song won the Daesang (or "Grand Prize"), the highest award for television, at the 2nd APAN Star Awards.

In 2014, Song reunited with Kang Dong-won in My Brilliant Life, E J-yong's film adaptation of Kim Aeran's bestselling novel My Palpitating Life about a couple who watched their son suffering from progeria grow prematurely old.

The romantic epic The Crossing was Song's second Chinese film. It was directed by John Woo. Song had a link to Woo because his longtime friend and producer Terence Chang had been managing Song's overseas activities since 2008. Previously titled 1949 and Love and Let Love, the long-gestating project had originally been announced at the Cannes Film Festival in 2008, then cancelled in 2009, only to be revived again in 2011. Woo's recovery from tonsil tumor removal in 2012 led to another delay due to scheduling conflicts among the cast, and Song finally began filming in June 2013. The Crossing is based on the true story of the Taiping steamer collision. It follows six characters' intertwining love stories in Taiwan and Shanghai during the 1930s. Song plays the daughter of a wealthy banker.

Another Chinese film followed in 2015, The Queens, a contemporary romantic comedy about three cosmopolitan women – an actress, a PR specialist, and a gallery manager – who manipulate friends and put down their enemies as they play the game of love. Also starring Joe Chen and Vivian Wu, it was actress Annie Yi's directorial debut.

In 2016, Song starred in the mega-hit romantic comedy series Descendants of the Sun, an intense drama about an army captain (played by Song Joong-ki) and a surgeon (Song) who fall in love while working in disaster-torn areas. The drama was very popular in Korea with a peak viewership rating of 41.6% and also in Asia, where it was viewed 2.5 billion times on iQiyi. The popularity of the drama reestablished Song as a leader of the Korean wave. She topped popularity polls across Asia and was recognized for her broad brand recognition in South Korea. Song won the Daesang (Grand Prize), the highest award at the 2016 KBS Drama Awards along with her co-star, Song Joong-ki.

=== 2018–2024: Brief hiatus and success with Encounter and The Glory ===
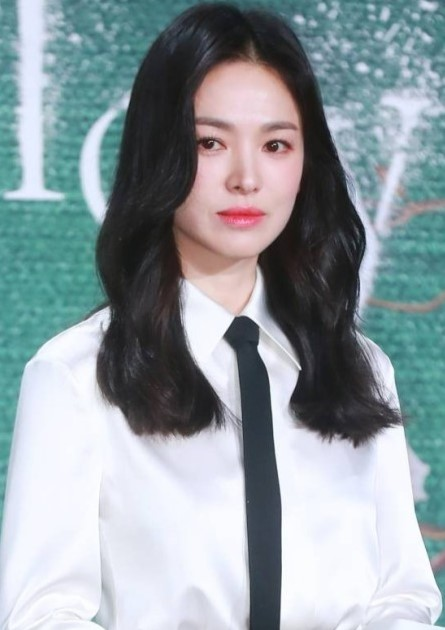
Song at Netflix's The Glory press conference in December 2022

After a two-year hiatus, she returned to the small screen in her first cable television series with the romantic-melodrama Encounter alongside Park Bo-gum. Filmed partly in Cuba, it became one of the highest-rated Korean dramas in cable television history achieving a ratings high of 10.329% nationwide. A commercial success, Encounter's broadcasting rights were sold to several countries outside South Korea.

In 2021, Song starred in SBS's romantic drama Now, We Are Breaking Up, playing the team leader of the design department at a fashion company. In 2022, Song reunited with Descendants of the Sun writer Kim Eun-sook in the Netflix series The Glory. The series was seen widely across the country and Song's portrayal of Moon Dong-eun, a victim of brutal high school bullying who dedicates her adulthood to plotting revenge against the perpetrators, was met with praise by the critics. For her performance in the series, Song won Best Actress – Television at the 59th Baeksang Arts Awards.

=== 2025–present: Established actress ===
Song headlined the supernatural thriller film Dark Nuns which premiered in South Korea in January 2025. Song was nominated for Best Actress at the 61st Baeksang Arts Awards for her performance. The same year, Song made a special appearance in Netflix's series Genie, Make a Wish written by Kim Eun-sook. In 2026, Song will star in the Netflix series Tantara. This project marks the third collaboration between Song and Noh, who previously worked together on Worlds Within (2008) and That Winter, the Wind Blows (2013).

On October 23, 2026, it was reported that Song has signed an exclusive contract with the management agency STAND. Recently, Song concluded her exclusive contract with UAA, the agency she had been with for 14 years, and has now set out on an independent path.

== Public image and reception ==
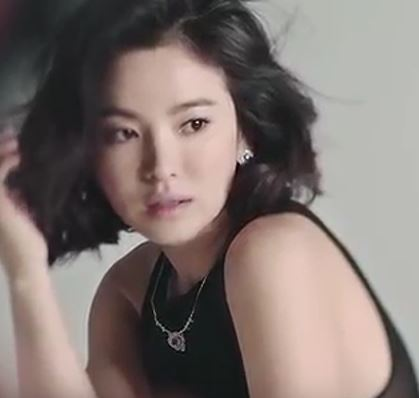
Song for Marie Claire Korea in 2014

In the media, Song is widely recognized as one of South Korea's most iconic actresses. Following her breakout performance in Autumn in My Heart in 2000, Song received the KBS Drama Awards Popularity Award and Photogenic Award. The series' melancholy tone and high ratings (peaking at over 40%) marked a new era in melodramatic storytelling, with Song praised for her poignant, emotional delivery.

Due to her widely-acclaimed performances, Song was considered part of the elite "Tae-Hye-Ji" trio — alongside Kim Tae-hee and Jun Ji-hyun — who were widely regarded as beauty and talent icons in Korean entertainment during the '00s. Song has also been celebrated for her versatile acting and influence in the fashion and beauty industries.

In a January 2025 interview, Song said she is grateful for the "Tae-Hye-Ji" label but feels newer actors should now carry the torch, adding that she prefers to be recognized for her acting rather than for her looks.

== Personal life ==
=== Marriage ===
On July 5, 2017, Song and Descendants of the Sun co-star Song Joong-ki announced through their respective agencies that they were engaged. They married in a private ceremony on October 31, 2017, at Youngbingwan, Hotel Shilla in Seoul, amid intense media interest across Asia. The ceremony was attended by the couple's closest family and friends, including actors Lee Kwang-soo, Yoo Ah-in, and Park Bo-gum, who also played the piano at the reception. On June 27, 2019, Song Joong-ki revealed that he had filed for divorce with Song Hye-kyo the previous day. The divorce was finalised in July 2019. On July 25, 2019, Song Hye-kyo filed a complaint against fifteen online netizens for "spread of false information, defamation of character and insult".

=== Legal issues ===
In August 2014, following an inadvertent revelation by a politician overseeing the National Tax Service of South Korea, Song made a public apology for committing tax evasion after seeking tax relief for undocumented expenses. In response to allegations that she had underpaid her income tax from 2009 to 2011 by ₩2.56 billion, she argued that the failures resulted from her accountant's failures to properly file her tax documents and that she had been unaware of any tax-filing irregularities. After being notified by the NTS in October 2012, Song paid the tax balance due plus the full of income tax penalties in the aggregate of ₩3.8 billion (US$2,760,000 (equivalent to $2,832,608 in 2025)). Song was again billed another ₩700 million in April 2014 against her 2008 tax filing, a result of the legally required five-year audit neglected after the 2012 notification.

== Other ventures ==
=== Endorsements ===
From 2001 to 2005, Song became a model and endorser for Etude House, being their longest-serving model during that time. In 2008, Song was chosen as by Laneige to be its global brand ambassador. In December 2017, Song was named as brand ambassador for Sulwhasoo, a South Korean luxury skincare subsidiary brand of Amorepacific Corporation. In 2018, Song became the Asia-Pacific brand ambassador of the luxury heritage jewellery house for Chaumet. Since 2024, she has been global ambassador for Chaumet along with Cha Eun-woo. In 2021, she became the first Korean brand ambassador of the Italian fashion house Fendi. In January 2025, Song was selected as the first Asia-Pacific skincare and makeup ambassador for the French luxury beauty house Guerlain. As of January 2026, Song officially became a global ambassador for Guerlain. On September 18, 2026, Song was appointed as a brand ambassador for the Italian luxury fashion house Bottega Veneta.

=== Philanthropy ===
Song frequently makes large charitable donations. In October 2013, Song donated 1,000 tickets to the Busan International Film Festival for underprivileged young people in the Busan area. In July 2014, Song purchased 800 tickets for the Seoul International Women's Film Festival and donated them to the Korean Psychological Association and the Magdalena Community. In December 2016, Song made a donation to the Beautiful Foundation, to be used to support education for low-income students who dream of becoming design experts. In July 2017, Song donated 100 million won to Seoul National University Children's Hospital. In March 2022, Song donated ₩100 million to Korean Red Cross to help the victims of the massive wildfire that started in Uljin, North Gyeongsang Province and has spread to Samcheok, Gangwon.

==== Collaboration with Professor Seo Kyung-duk ====
Since 2012, Song has partnered with Sungshin Women's University professor Seo Kyung-duk on projects promoting the Korean language and history abroad, primarily by funding Korean-language brochures and guidebooks for museums and historic sites. Early projects included a Korean guidebook at New York's Museum of Modern Art and materials for the Yun Bong-gil Memorial Hall in Shanghai. Other initiatives launched around Hangul Day included a museum-information smartphone app and a promotional display at the Museum of Fine Arts, Boston. She sponsored braille guidebooks for the Independence Hall of Korea, and supported donations to sites such as Harbin's An Jung-geun Memorial Hall and the Royal Ontario Museum in Toronto. More recent efforts produced large-run "Our History Overseas" guides for Paris (2020) and San Francisco (2022). In 2022 and 2023, donations also included Korean guidebooks for the Utoro Peace Memorial Museum in Japan, handbook distributions via the Korean Embassy in Washington, D.C., and materials marking the 78th anniversary of Liberation Day.

== Discography ==
=== Singles ===
| Title | Year | Album | Notes |
|---|---|---|---|
| "Switch: Be White" (with John Park) | 2012 | Non-album single | for Laneige ads |
| "After Love" (후애 (後愛)) | January 10, 2025 | Non-album single | |

== Bibliography ==
| Year | Title | Type | Publisher | ISBN |
|---|---|---|---|---|
| 2011 | Song Hye-kyo's Moment | Photo Book | Nangman Books | 9788994842127 |
| 2012 | It's Time for Hye-kyo | Photo Essay | Nangman Books | 9788994842226 |
