= Guardian Angel (TV series) =

South Korean television program

- Promotional poster
- Hangul: 수호천사
- Hanja: 守護天使
- RR: Suhocheonsa
- MR: Suhoch'ŏnsa
- Genre: Drama, Romance
- Written by: Lee Hee-myung
- Directed by: Kim Young-sup
- Starring: Song Hye-kyo; Kim Min-jong
- Country of origin: South Korea
- Original language: Korean
- No. of episodes: 16

Production
- Producer: Goo Bon-geun
- Production location: Korea
- Running time: 60 minutes Wednesdays and Thursdays at 21:55 (KST)

Original release
- Network: SBS TV
- Release: August 1 – September 20, 2001

Guardian Angel (Korean: 수호천사) is a 2001 South Korean television series starring Song Hye-kyo and Kim Min-jong. It aired on SBS from August 1 to September 20, 2001, every Wednesday and Thursday at 21:55 (KST).

== Synopsis ==
When her pregnant friend gives birth then dies after a vehicular accident, Jung Da-so raises the child as her own. Da-so was an orphan who endures the stigma of being an unwed mother in order for her daughter to have a family. Ha Tae-woong, who was raised by his uncle after his mother died, has never met his father. Da-so and Tae-woong meet as employees of Woori Company, whose president is Tae-woong's father. Through a twist of fate, their lives become entwined with Kang Sae-hyun and Ho Ji-soo, and Da-so sees both the best and worst in human nature.

== Cast ==
- Song Hye-kyo as Jung Da-so
- Kim Min-jong as Ha Tae-woong
- Kim Min as Ho Ji-soo
- Yoon Da-hoon as Kang Sae-hyun
- Jang Hang-sun as Ha Deok-ho, Tae-woong's uncle
- Kim Bo-sung as Soon-dong, Tae-woong's friend
- Lee Soon-jae as Kang Doo-shik, Tae-woong's father
- Jung Eo-jin as Da-so's adoptive daughter
- Choi Jae-won as Mr. Na, Da-so's co-worker
- Kim Seung-wook
- Kim Hyung-bum
- Lee Mi-young
- Eun Seo-woo
- Park Joo-mi
- Seo Bum-yul
- Lee Do-ryun
- Lee Hee-do
- Jo Mi-ryung as Yeo Eun-joo
- Song Geum-shik
