= The Queens (2015 film) =

- Traditional Chinese: 我是女王
- Simplified Chinese: 我是女王
- Hanyu Pinyin: Wǒ Shì Nǚwāng
- Directed by: Annie Yi
- Written by: Annie Yi; Wang Anan; Gu Yi
- Produced by: Annie Yi; Ann An
- Starring: Song Hye-kyo; Shawn Dou; Joe Chen; Tony Yang; Vivian Wu; Jiang Wu; Joe Cheng; Qin Hao; Annie Yi
- Cinematography: Mark Lee Ping Bin
- Production company: DSIM
- Distributed by: DSIM; Levp
- Release date: 16 April 2015
- Running time: 106 minutes
- Country: China
- Language: Mandarin
- Box office: US$2.46 million (China)

The Queens is a 2015 Chinese romance film based on the novel of the same name. The film is directed by Annie Yi and produced by Annie Yi and Ann An. It stars Song Hye-kyo, Shawn Dou, Joe Chen, Tony Yang, Vivian Wu, Jiang Wu, Joe Cheng, Qin Hao, and Annie Yi. The Queens was released on 16 April 2015.

== Cast ==
- Song Hye-kyo as Annie
- Shawn Dou as Mark
- Joe Chen as Candy
- Tony Yang as Tony
- Vivian Wu as Tina
- Jiang Wu as Jiawei
- Joe Cheng as Wang Ziyu
- Qin Hao as Zhang Yi
- Annie Yi as Melissa
- Sean Sun as Leo

== Production ==
Filming took place in Beijing and Shanghai.

== Release ==
The film was originally to be released on 7 November 2014 but was pushed back to 16 April 2015.
