= A Reason to Live (2011 film) =

- Theatrical release poster
- Hangul: 오늘
- Lit.: Today
- RR: Oneul
- MR: Onŭl
- Directed by: Lee Jeong-hyang
- Written by: Lee Jeong-hyang
- Produced by: Hwang Woo-hyun; Hwang Jae-woo; Terence Chang
- Starring: Song Hye-kyo; Nam Ji-hyun; Song Chang-eui; Ki Tae-young
- Cinematography: Kim Hyeong-ju
- Edited by: Kim Sang-bum; Kim Jae-bum
- Music by: Kim Dae-hong; Kim Yang-hui
- Distributed by: Lotte Entertainment
- Release date: 27 October 2011
- Running time: 119 minutes
- Country: South Korea
- Language: Korean
- Box office: US$365,190

A Reason to Live (Korean: 오늘; RR: Oneul; lit. 'Today') is a 2011 South Korean drama film written and directed by Lee Jeong-hyang. It stars Song Hye-kyo as a director who forgives a teenage boy for killing her fiancé. It premiered at the 2011 Busan International Film Festival, and was released in theaters on October 27, 2011. It received 131,194 admissions.

== Plot ==
Documentary filmmaker Da-hae loses her fiancé by a hit and run accident on her birthday. But she forgives the criminal who was a 15-year-old boy based on her belief as a Catholic and signs a petition to revoke the juvenile's death penalty. One year later, Da-hae is commissioned by the Catholic Church to make a documentary on the inhumanity of capital punishment. However, her moral convictions and desire to be compassionate are seriously questioned when she finds out that the teenage driver killed a classmate, not long after his reprieve.

== Cast ==
- Song Hye-kyo as Da-hae
  - Kim Ji-young as young Da-hae
- Nam Ji-hyun as Ji-min
- Song Chang-eui as Ji-suk
- Ki Tae-young as Sang-woo
- Kim Kwak-kyung-hee as Store owner
- Joo In-young as Baby's mother
